= Phryssonotus hystrix =

Scientific classification
- Kingdom: Animalia
- Phylum: Arthropoda
- Subphylum: Myriapoda
- Class: Diplopoda
- Order: Polyxenida
- Family: Synxenidae
- Genus: Phryssonotus
- Species: P. hystrix

Binomial name
- Phryssonotus hystrix (Menge, 1854)

Genus of millipedes

Phryssonotus hystrix is a species of bristle millipede known from South Africa and Mozambique. Individuals are up to 4 mm long and have 12 body segments and 17 pairs of legs. The species was described by Austrian zoologist Carl Attems in 1928.
