= Polyxenus fasciculatus =

Conservation status
- Secure (NatureServe)

Scientific classification
- Kingdom: Animalia
- Phylum: Arthropoda
- Subphylum: Myriapoda
- Class: Diplopoda
- Order: Polyxenida
- Family: Polyxenidae
- Genus: Polyxenus
- Species: P. fasciculatus

Binomial name
- Polyxenus fasciculatus Say, 1821

Species of millipede

Polyxenus fasciculatus is a species of polyxenid millipede about 2 millimetres (0.079 in) long which is notable for its use of detachable bristles which entangle predatory ants. The bristles have grappling hooks at the tip which lock on to the setae of an ant, and barbs along their length which cause them to interlink . The species can be found in the eastern United States, in a region stretching from Maryland to Illinois to Texas. It has also been found in the Caribbean Islands and Canary Islands.
