= Lophoturus aequatus =

Scientific classification
- Domain: Eukaryota
- Kingdom: Animalia
- Phylum: Arthropoda
- Subphylum: Myriapoda
- Class: Diplopoda
- Order: Polyxenida
- Family: Lophoproctidae
- Genus: Lophoturus
- Species: L. aequatus

Binomial name
- Lophoturus aequatus (Loomis, 1936)

Species of millipede

Lophoturus aequatus is a species of bristle millipede in the family Lophoproctidae.
