= Polyxenus pugetensis =

Scientific classification
- Domain: Eukaryota
- Kingdom: Animalia
- Phylum: Arthropoda
- Subphylum: Myriapoda
- Class: Diplopoda
- Order: Polyxenida
- Family: Polyxenidae
- Genus: Polyxenus
- Species: P. pugetensis

Binomial name
- Polyxenus pugetensis Kincaid, 1898

Species of millipede

Polyxenus pugetensis is a species of bristle millipede in the family Polyxenidae.
