= Polyxenus anacapensis =

Scientific classification
- Domain: Eukaryota
- Kingdom: Animalia
- Phylum: Arthropoda
- Subphylum: Myriapoda
- Class: Diplopoda
- Order: Polyxenida
- Family: Polyxenidae
- Genus: Polyxenus
- Species: P. anacapensis

Binomial name
- Polyxenus anacapensis Pierce, 1940

Species of millipede

Polyxenus anacapensis is a species of bristle millipede in the family Polyxenidae.
