= Macroxenodes bartschi =

Scientific classification
- Kingdom: Animalia
- Phylum: Arthropoda
- Subphylum: Myriapoda
- Class: Diplopoda
- Order: Polyxenida
- Family: Polyxenidae
- Genus: Macroxenodes
- Species: M. bartschi

Binomial name
- Macroxenodes bartschi (Chamberlin, 1922)

Species of millipede

Macroxenodes bartschi is a species of bristle millipede in the family Polyxenidae. It is found in North America.
