= Macroxenodes =

Scientific classification
- Domain: Eukaryota
- Kingdom: Animalia
- Phylum: Arthropoda
- Subphylum: Myriapoda
- Class: Diplopoda
- Order: Polyxenida
- Family: Polyxenidae
- Genus: Macroxenodes; Silvestri, 1948

Genus of bristly millipedes

Macroxenodes is a genus of bristle millipedes in the family Polyxenidae. There are at least four described species in Macroxenodes.

== Species ==
These four species belong to the genus Macroxenodes:

- Macroxenodes amazonicus Ishii, Jacquemin-Nguyen Duy & Condé, 1999
- Macroxenodes bartschi (Chamberlin, 1922)
- Macroxenodes meinerti (Silvestri, 1898)
- Macroxenodes poecilus (Chamberlin, 1923)
