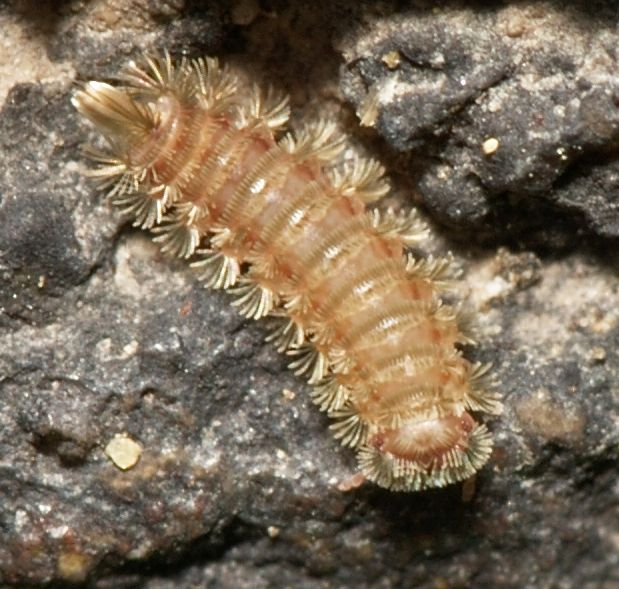
- Polyxenus lagurus

Scientific classification
- Kingdom: Animalia
- Phylum: Arthropoda
- Subphylum: Myriapoda
- Class: Diplopoda
- Order: Polyxenida
- Family: Polyxenidae
- Genus: Polyxenus; Latreille, 1802/1803

= Polyxenus (millipede) =

Polyxenus Temporal range: Eocene–Present

Genus of millipedes

Polyxenus is a genus of millipede in the family Polyxenidae. This genus includes at least 29 valid species. This genus has a worldwide distribution, with species found on all continents except Antarctica.

== Description ==
Adults in this genus feature 10 tergites in front of the telson and 13 pairs of legs. The tergites each feature two transverse rows of bristles. These millipedes usually feature eyes, most often with five or six ommatidia on each side, but the number of these ommatidia can range from zero to ten on each side.

== Species ==
- Polyxenus albus Pocock, 1894
- Polyxenus anacapensis Pierce, 1940
- Polyxenus anophthalius Ishii & Yin, 2000
- Polyxenus buxtoni Brollemann, 1921
- Polyxenus caudatus Menge, 1854
- Polyxenus chalcidicus Conde & Nguyen Duy-Jacquemin, 1971
- Polyxenus chilensis Silvestri, 1903
- Polyxenus colurus Menge, 1854
- Polyxenus conformis Koch & Berendt, 1854
- Polyxenus fasciculatus Say, 1821
- Polyxenus germanicus Verhoeff, 1941
- Polyxenus hangzhoensis Ishii & Liang, 1990
- Polyxenus hawaiiensis Silvestri, 1904
- Polyxenus koreanus Ishii & Choi, 1988
- Polyxenus lagurus (Linnaeus, 1758)
- Polyxenus lapidicola Silvestri, 1903
- Polyxenus lepagei Mello-Leitao, 1925
- Polyxenus lophurus Menge, 1854
- Polyxenus lucidus Chalande, 1888
- Polyxenus macedonicus Verhoeff, 1952
- Polyxenus oromii Nguyen Duy-Jacquemin, 1996
- Polyxenus ovalis Koch & Berendt, 1854
- Polyxenus paraguayensis Silvestri, 1903
- Polyxenus platensis Silvestri, 1903
- Polyxenus ponticus Lignau, 1903
- Polyxenus pugetensis Kincaid, 1898
- Polyxenus rossi Chamberlin, 1957
- Polyxenus senex Mello-Leitao, 1925
- Polyxenus shinoharai Ishii, 1983
- Polyxenus sokolowi Lignau, 1924
- Polyxenus superbus Silvestri, 1903
- Polyxenus triocellatus Ishii & Yin, 2000
- Polyxenus tuberculatus Pierce, 1940

=== Fossil species ===
- †Polyxenus miocenica Srivastava et al. 2006 Kerala amber, India, Miocene
- †Polyxenus ovalis Koch and Berendt 1854 Baltic amber, Eocene
- †Polyxenus coniformis Koch and Berendt 1854 Baltic amber, Eocene
- †Polyxenus colurus Menge 1854 Baltic amber, Eocene
- †Polyxenus caudatus Menge 1854 Baltic amber, Eocene
- †Polyxenus lophurus Menge 1854 Baltic amber, Eocene
