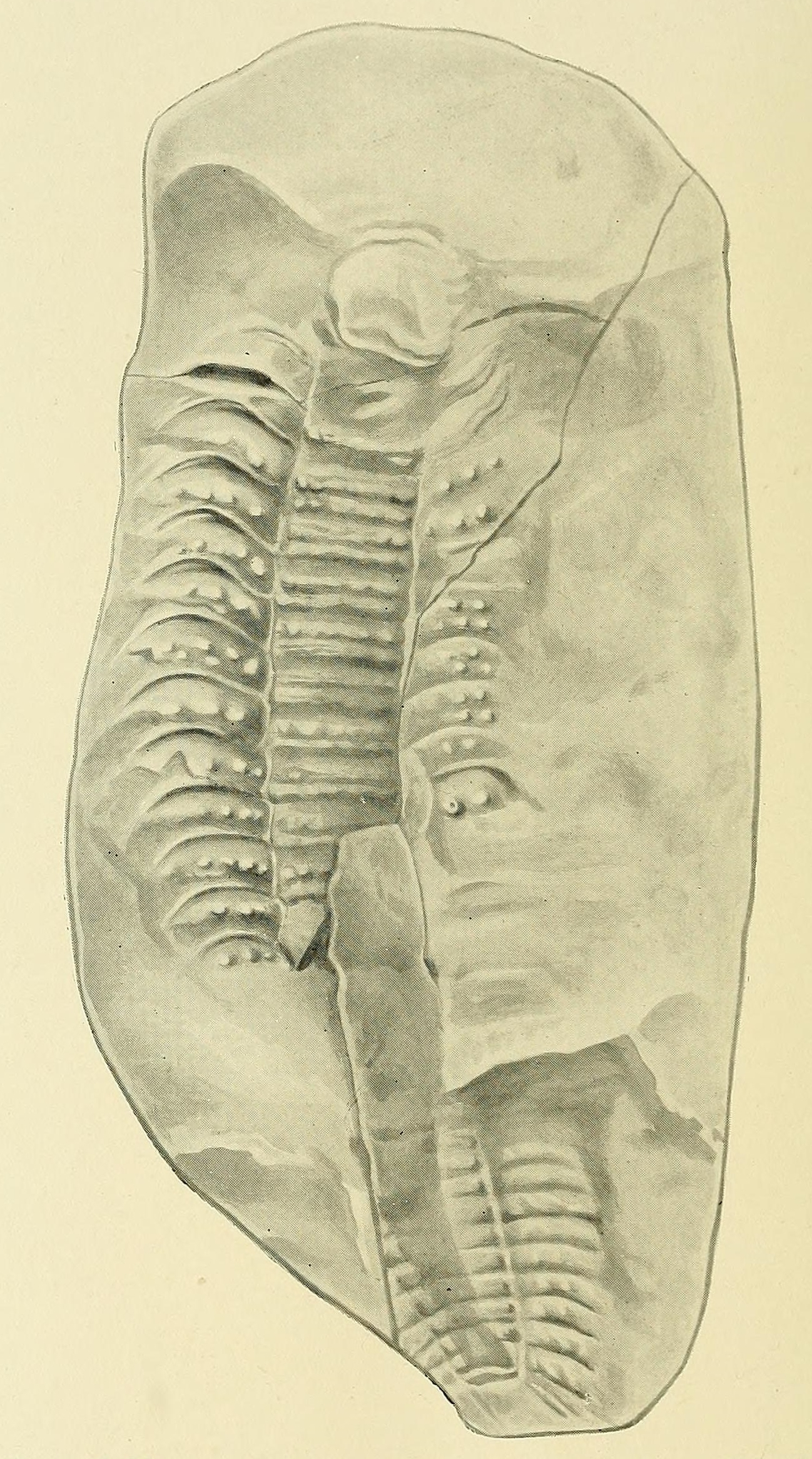
- Arthropleura fossil illustration

Scientific classification
- Kingdom: Animalia
- Phylum: Arthropoda
- Subphylum: Myriapoda
- Class: Diplopoda
- Subclass: †Arthropleuridea; Waterlot, 1934

Orders
- Arthropleurida; Eoarthropleurida; ?Microdecemplicida

= Arthropleuridea =

Arthropleuridea Temporal range: Late Silurian - Sakmarian 423–290 Ma

Extinct subclass of millipedes

Arthropleuridea, from Ancient Greek ἄρθρον (árthron), meaning "joint", and πλευρά (pleurá), meaning "rib", is an extinct subclass of myriapod arthropods that flourished during the Carboniferous period, having first arisen during the Silurian, and perishing in the Early Permian. Members are characterized by possessing diplosegmental (fused "double segments", as in modern-day millipedes) paranotal tergal lobes separated from the body axis by a suture, and by sclerotized plates buttressing the leg insertions. The nature of their eyes, antennae, and mouthparts is undetermined for want of fossils that include the entire head, as against the collum.

Despite their unique features, recent phylogenetic research suggests Arthropleuridea be included among millipedes in the class Diplopoda. The subclass contains three or two recognized orders, each with a single genus.

== Paleobiology ==
Arthropleurids lived in the moist coal swamps that were common at the time and may have burrowed in the undergrowth. They were either herbivores or detritivores. Besides their size, their most distinguishing features were their legs, a total of between 32 and 64 of them in approximately eight jointed pairs per six body segments, and extremely tough exoskeletons. There is no evidence of spiracles, so the animals must have used lungs or gills for respiration.

Most arthropleurideans are thought to have been terrestrial, although, as they lack any known respiratory structure, their terrestriality is assumed only by analogy to modern arthropods. Early forms, however, including Eoarthropleura (order Eoarthropleurida), appear to have been aquatic. For this reason, some question Arthropleuridea's inclusion among millipedes because no modern aquatic myriapods are known.

== Distribution and size ==
Arthropleuridea is most famous for Arthropleura (order Arthropleurida). Tracks from Arthropleura up to 50 cm wide have been found at Joggins, Nova Scotia. Reaching over 2 meters in length, arthropleurids are among the largest arthropods ever to have lived. The lack of large terrestrial vertebrate predators and the highly oxygenic atmosphere at that time probably enabled them to grow so large. It was previously believed that Arthropleura became extinct as the coal swamps dried out. However, many fossils have been discovered after the Carboniferous rainforest collapse. A more recent proposal is that predation by tetrapods and the aridification of the equator caused it to become extinct. Arthropleura has been found from the Upper Carboniferous of Europe and North America.

Eoarthropleura has been found from the Upper Silurian through the Upper Devonian of Europe and North America.

Microdecemplex, of the order Microdecemplicida, was dwarfed by the other Arthropleurideans, at just a few millimeters long. The genus is known from the Middle through Upper Devonian of New York state, USA. It has been suggested to reject this genus from Arthropleuridea, however, after research of well-preserved specimens of Arthropleura.

== Classification and placement ==
After several decades' uncertainty, Arthropleuridea was placed within the Diplopoda in the year 2000. However, there is still controversy regarding the relationships of the three orders to living millipede groups. Some authors place Arthropleuridea within the Chilognatha, as a sister group to all living Chilognathan millipedes (Pentazonia + Helminthomorpha). An alternate hypothesis breaks up the subclass: placing the orders Arthropleurida and Eoarthropleurida within the basal Penicillata (as sister to the living Polyxenida), and leaving only Microdecemplicida as a sister group to the living Chilognatha. Under this hypothesis, Arthropleuridea would be paraphyletic.

== See also ==
- Archipolypoda, another extinct group of millipedes including the earliest known air-breathing animal
- Euthycarcinoidea, a group of enigmatic arthropods that may be ancestral to myriapods
- Colonization of land, major evolutionary stages leading to terrestrial organisms
