= Hypogexeninae =

Scientific classification
- Kingdom: Animalia
- Phylum: Arthropoda
- Subphylum: Myriapoda
- Class: Diplopoda
- Order: Polyxenida
- Family: Polyxenidae
- Subfamily: Hypogexeninae; Schubart, 1947

Synonyms
- Hypogexeninae Schubart, 1947

Family of millipedes

Hypogexeninae is a subfamily of millipedes belonging to the family Polyxenidae, order Polyxenida. It was formerly treated as the family Hypogexenidae.

Genera:

- Hypogexenus Silvestri, 1903
