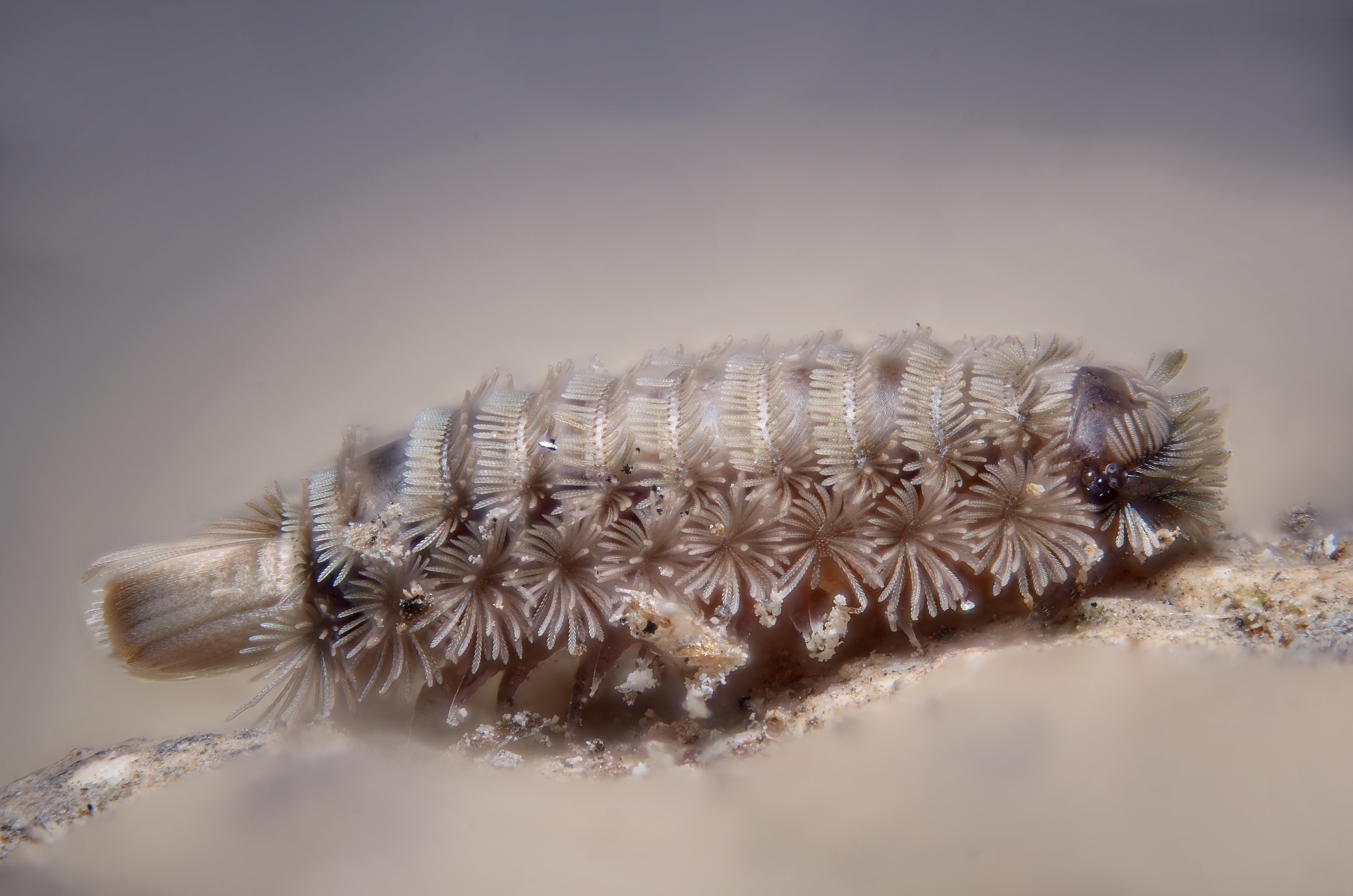

Scientific classification
- Kingdom: Animalia
- Phylum: Arthropoda
- Subphylum: Myriapoda
- Class: Diplopoda
- Order: Polyxenida
- Family: Polyxenidae
- Genus: Polyxenus
- Species: P. lagurus

Binomial name
- Polyxenus lagurus (Linnaeus, 1758)

Synonyms
- Scolopendra lagura Linnaeus, 1758

= Polyxenus lagurus =

Species of millipede

Polyxenus lagurus, also known as the bristly millipede, is a species of millipede in the family Polyxenidae. This millipede is common in Europe and found in many areas of North America. Like other species in the genus Polyxenus, this species is small and covered with detachable bristles that can entangle ants and spiders that attack the millipede. This species is notable for including populations that are parthenogenetic as well as those that reproduce sexually.

== Description ==
This small millipede ranges from 2 mm to 4 mm in length and from 0.5 mm to 1.0 mm in width. The adults of this species feature ten tergites and 13 pairs of legs. The body has a flat shape and a pale brown color and is covered with brown bristles. These bristles are arranged in two transverse rows with lateral tufts on each segment, including the head and collum, lateral tufts on each pleurite but the first, and two long brushes on the posterior end of the telson. The genital openings are located behind the second leg pair. In populations that reproduce sexually, the females are slightly larger than the males.

== Distribution ==
This species is found in the Holarctic realm and widely distributed in Europe and North America. This millipede is the most common species in the order Polyxenida in Europe and the only representative of this order in the British Isles. In North America, this species has been recorded in Massachusetts, New York, New Jersey, Ohio, Michigan, Illinois, Colorado, Montana, Arizona, and Washington in the US. and Nova Scotia, Québec, Ontario and British Columbia in Canada. This millipede is also found in Melbourne, Australia, where authorities suspect introduction by humans.

== Ecology and habitats ==
This species is most often found under the bark of dead trees, especially coniferous trees, but is also found in forest leaf litter and under stones. In coastal regions, this millipede is also found at the roots of halophile plants and on lichens and moss on boulders. Although typically found in litter and bark, this species is also commonly found on rocks and old stone or brick walls. This millipede is most easily found at night, especially in humid conditions, but is also active during daytime, often in warm and dry conditions and direct sunlight. It is believed that this species feeds on lichens, algae, and small fungi.

Group of bristly millipedes living in rotting wood

== Reproduction ==
In populations of this species that reproduce sexually, the male transfers sperm to the female indirectly rather than directly. The male constructs a silken web and places a spermatophore on it, then produces signal threads to guide the female to the spermatophore. The male produces these threads using glands that open at the base of the eighth and ninth leg pairs. The female later finds and follows these threads and presses her genital opening to the spermatophore. The female subsequently lays fewer than a dozen eggs, glues them in place with a sticky secretion, and protects them with a mass of bristles removed from the brush at the end of her telson.

In other populations, this species reproduces without males. In Europe, for example, the fraction of this species that is male declines from southern France through the Netherlands, Denmark, and Sweden, to Finland, where males may be entirely absent. The parthenogenetic form of this species is found in Germany, Poland, and Russia. The sexually reproducing form seems to prefer humid coastal areas and is found in southern France, the Netherlands, and the British Isles. Both forms occur in southern Scandinavia.

== Development ==
Juveniles of this species grow and develop through a series of molts, adding segments and legs until they reach a fixed number in the adult stage. Adults then continue to molt, but they do not add segments or legs. This mode of development is known as hemianamorphosis. The young hatch with only 3 pairs of legs and 4 tergites, then develop through a series of seven molts and emerge as adults with 13 leg pairs and 10 tergites in the eighth stage. In this process, this millipede goes through stages with 3, 4, 5, 6, 8, 10, 12, and 13 leg pairs.
