= Condexenus =

Scientific classification
- Kingdom: Animalia
- Phylum: Arthropoda
- Subphylum: Myriapoda
- Class: Diplopoda
- Order: Polyxenida
- Family: Synxenidae
- Genus: Condexenus; Nguyen Duy-Jacquemin, 2006
- Species: C. biramipalpus

Binomial name
- Condexenus biramipalpus Nguyen Duy-Jacquemin, 2006

Genus of millipedes

Condexenus is a genus of bristle millipede containing the sole species Condexenus biramipalpus known from Namibia. Individuals are up to 3 mm long, and adults possess 11 body segments and 15 pairs of legs.
