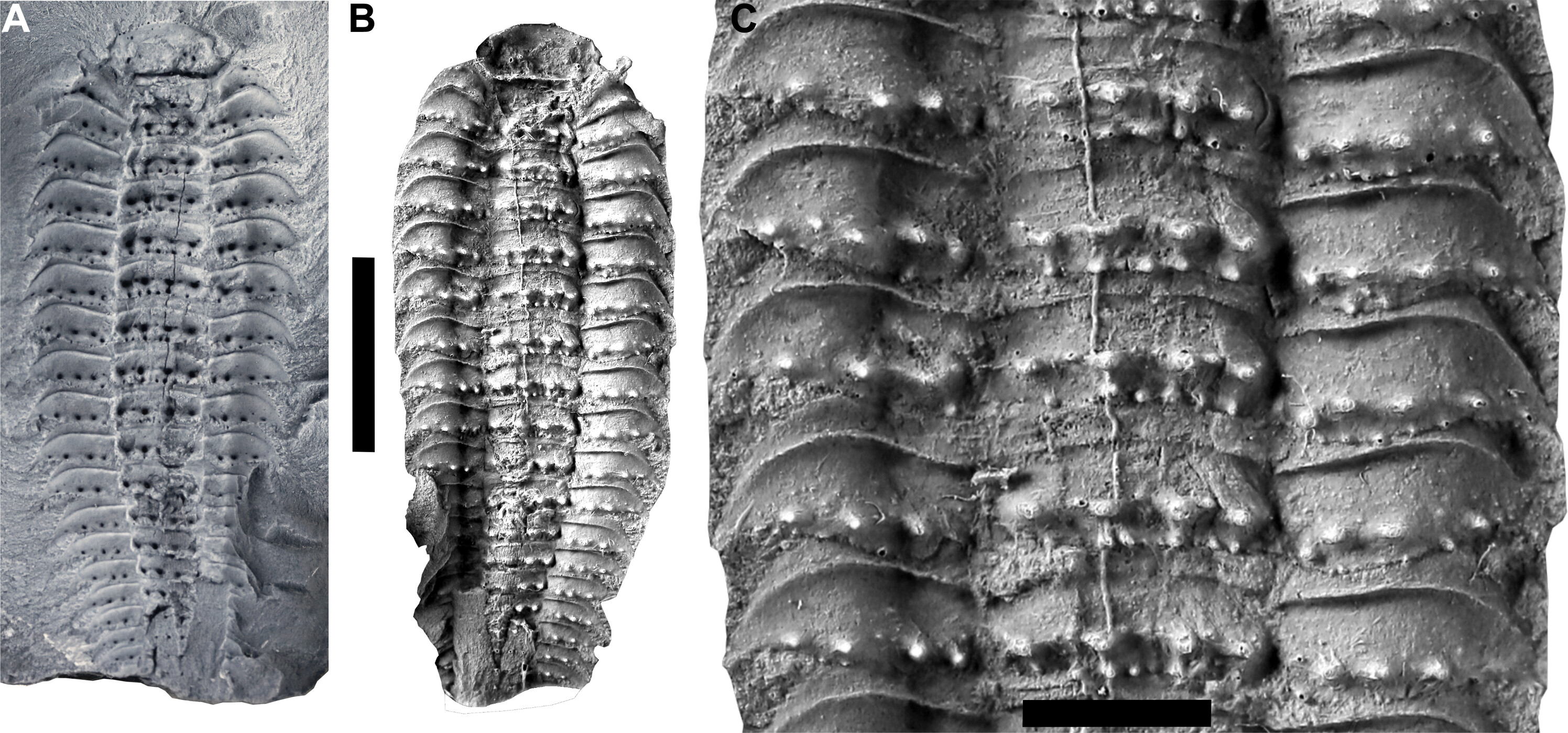
- Arthropleura sp., juvenile specimen from Montceau-les-Mines (France)
- Digital reconstruction of Arthropleura based on Montceau-les-Mines fossils

Scientific classification
- Kingdom: Animalia
- Phylum: Arthropoda
- Subphylum: Myriapoda
- Class: Diplopoda
- Subclass: †Arthropleuridea
- Order: †Arthropleurida; Waterlot, 1934
- Family: †Arthropleuridae; Zittel, 1885
- Genus: †Arthropleura; Meyer, 1854

Species
- A. armata Meyer, 1854; A. mammata Salter, 1863; A. fayoli Boule, 1893; A. maillieuxi Pruvost, 1930; A. cristata Richardson, 1959

Synonyms
- A. affinis Goldenberg, 1873; A. britannica Andrée, 1920; A. zeilleri Boule, 1893; A. moyseyi? Calman, 1914

= Arthropleura =

Arthropleura Temporal range: Early Viséan-Sakmarian, 344–292 Ma

Extinct genus of millipedes

Arthropleura, from Ancient Greek ἄρθρον (árthron), meaning "joint", and πλευρά (pleurá), meaning "rib", is an extinct genus of massive myriapod that lived in modern-day Europe and North America around 344 to 292 million years ago, from the Viséan stage of the lower Carboniferous period to the Sakmarian stage of the lower Permian period. It was a millipede, and was capable of reaching at least 2 metres (6 ft 7 in) in length, possibly up to over 2.5 metres (8 ft 2 in), making it the largest known land arthropod of all time. Arthropleura is known from body fossils as well as trace fossils, particularly giant trackways up to 50 centimetres (20 in) wide, and potentially also large burrows. It lived in open, sparsely wooded environments near water, and may have been amphibious.

== Classification ==
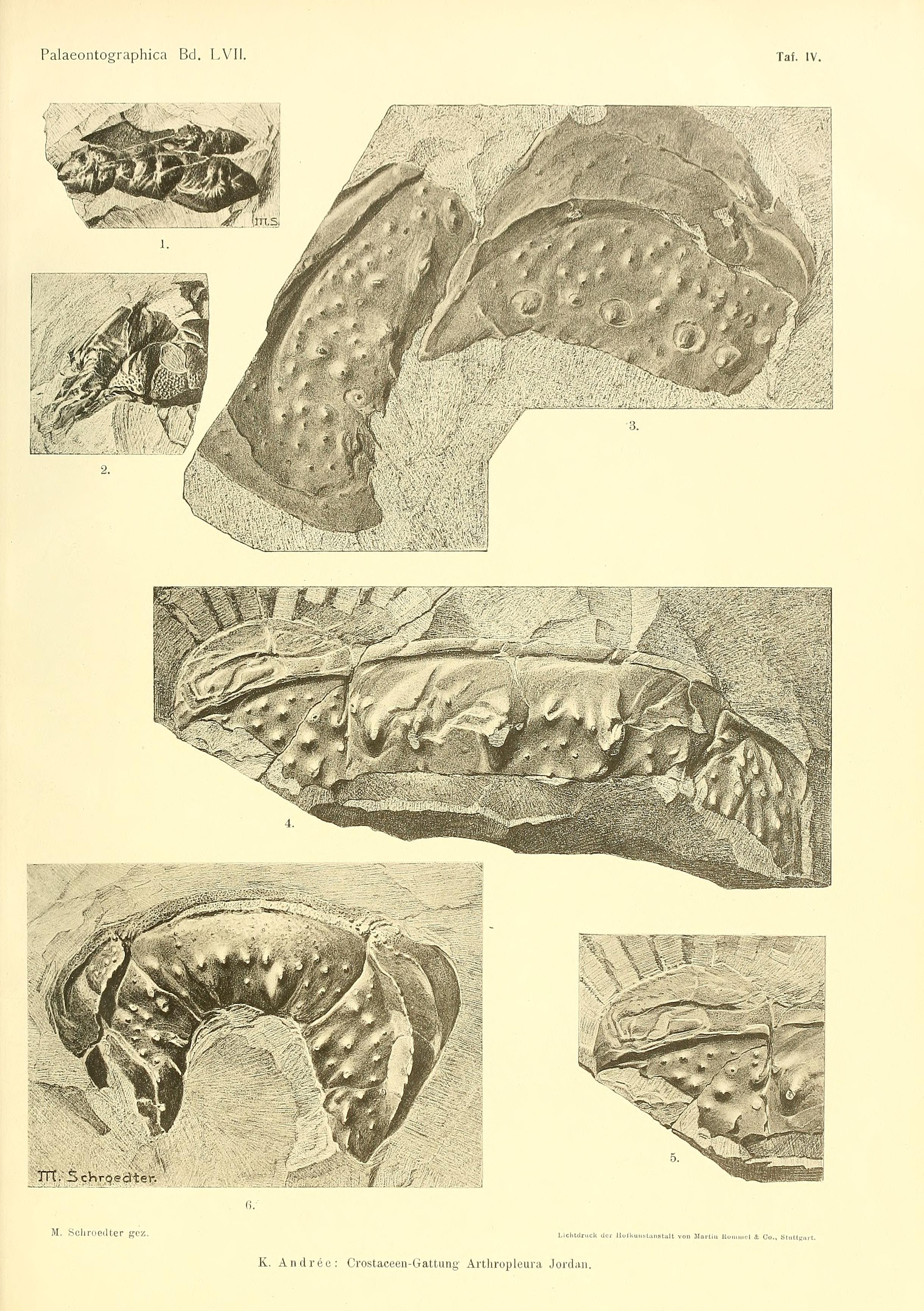
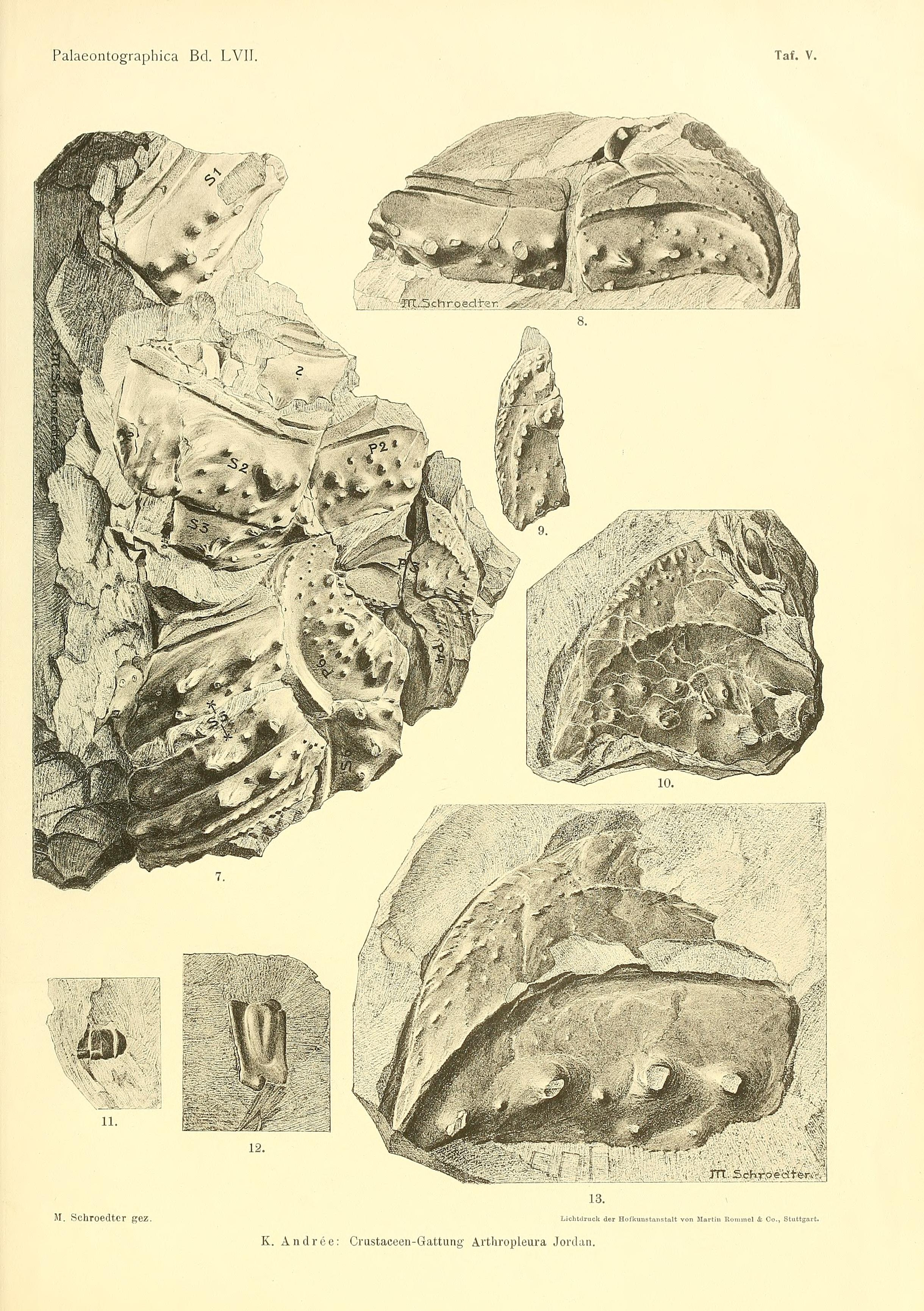
Illustrations of Arthropleura armata (Figs. 1-12) and Arthropleura mammata (Fig. 13) fossils, from Andree (1910).

First discovered in 1849 during construction of a railway near Friedrichsthal in Germany, Arthropleura has consistently attracted much artistic and scientific attention, yet has historically been known from mostly fragmentary remains. Prior to its description, the remains were attributed by Hermann von Meyer to a decapod crustacean: "Arthropleura armata, a larger crustacean that seems to be related to the decapods; the pleura and rachis form separate or easily separable parts; only body rings have been found of this remarkable crustacean". In their subsequent full description of the genus, Hermann Jordan and Hermann von Meyer compared it with trilobites and eurypterids. The name Arthropleura (from Greek arthron "joint" and pleura "rib") would refer to the exoskeleton armor, for the separation of the median tergite along the central axis of the body ("rachis") and a paratergite on the side ("rib" or "pleuron").

Another author, Moritz Kliver, described a small specimen of Arthropleura armata showing the underside, with a series of seven pairs of limbs articulated with various other plates, including the sternites. Kliver said that Arthropleura could not be an insect, arachnid, or myriapod, but instead that it was a non-decapod crustacean, comparing the appendages to those of branchiopods. Following authors tended to view Arthropleura in connection to isopods, some believing it represented a very primitive Eumalacostracan crusteacean. Palaeontologists Lewis Moysey and Henry Woodward were the first to associate Arthropleura with Myriapoda in 1911.

Gérard Waterlot published a landmark study in 1934, establishing the order Arthropleurida, placing the group as sister to order Trilobita, within the defunct crustacean subclass Archaeocrustacea. He believed the limbs to be composed of two branches, a lower walking leg and an upper gill branch, like the biramous limbs of trilobites. Palaeontologist Leif Størmer remarked on this study in 1944, writing that after careful study of the photographs, the supposed two branches of the limb are always found close together, close enough that even their joints consistently line up. Because of this, he interpreted the limbs as uniramous, having only a single branch. Waterlot referred a nearly complete juvenile specimen described by Dr. W. T. Calman as Arthropleura moyseyi to Arthropleura armata, and agreed that this specimen showed the mostly unknown head segment of the animal. A curved structure found along the edge of the head resembled the mandibles of some myriapods, and so it was seen by Waterlot as a cephalic feeding appendage, and that this meant Arthropleura was carnivorous, feeding on small soft-bodied prey. Waterlot also believed that Arthropleura was amphibious, living at the bottom of lakebeds, with occasional excursions onto the land where the humidity of coal swamps allowed it to continue breathing with its supposedly trilobite-like gills. Other authors preferred a terrestrial habitat, and questioned the carnivorous diet. The juvenile specimen described by Waterlot appeared to show various plant remains within the gut tract, more recently this has been seen as a taphonomic artifact. The most complete known adult specimen of Arthropleura (the Maybach specimen) was described by Paul Guthörl in 1935, discovered in the roof of a German coal mine and carefully extracted, measuring 90 centimetres (35 in) long.

Arthropleura as a myriapod or relative of myriapods (particularly diplopods) became the prevailing view among scientists in the following decades, and the limbs became quite well understood. Further species of Arthropleura have been described over the decades, mostly from central Europe and the UK, and even from the central United States with Arthropleura cristata. North American remains are also known from widespread walking traces, as well as fossil remains from Nova Scotia, Ohio, and Pennsylvania. The head segment, however, remained enigmatic even into the 21st century. What had previously been identified as the head was reinterpreted as the collum, the first segment behind the head, with the true head hidden beneath it. The Devonian millipede Microdecemplex was described in 1999, and was believed to belong to the subclass Arthropleuridea. These tiny fossils were much more complete, and so its head anatomy was taken as an insight into the head of Arthropleura.

In 2024, exceptionally preserved fossils from the Montceau-les-Mines Lagerstätte of France were studied and described with the aid of Micro-CT scanning, revealing the head region in two nearly complete juvenile Arthropleura fossils. They showed that the head identified by past authors was indeed the head, with the collum a thin segment behind it. Waterlot's cephalic limbs are now identified as paired ventral sclerites, protecting the head like a car bumper. The cephalic limbs showed two pairs of external maxillae, and an internal set of mandibles. Phylogenetic analysis found Arthropleura just outside of Diplopoda (stem-group Diplopoda), while Microdecemplex was found as a crown-group millipede rather than an arthropleuridean.

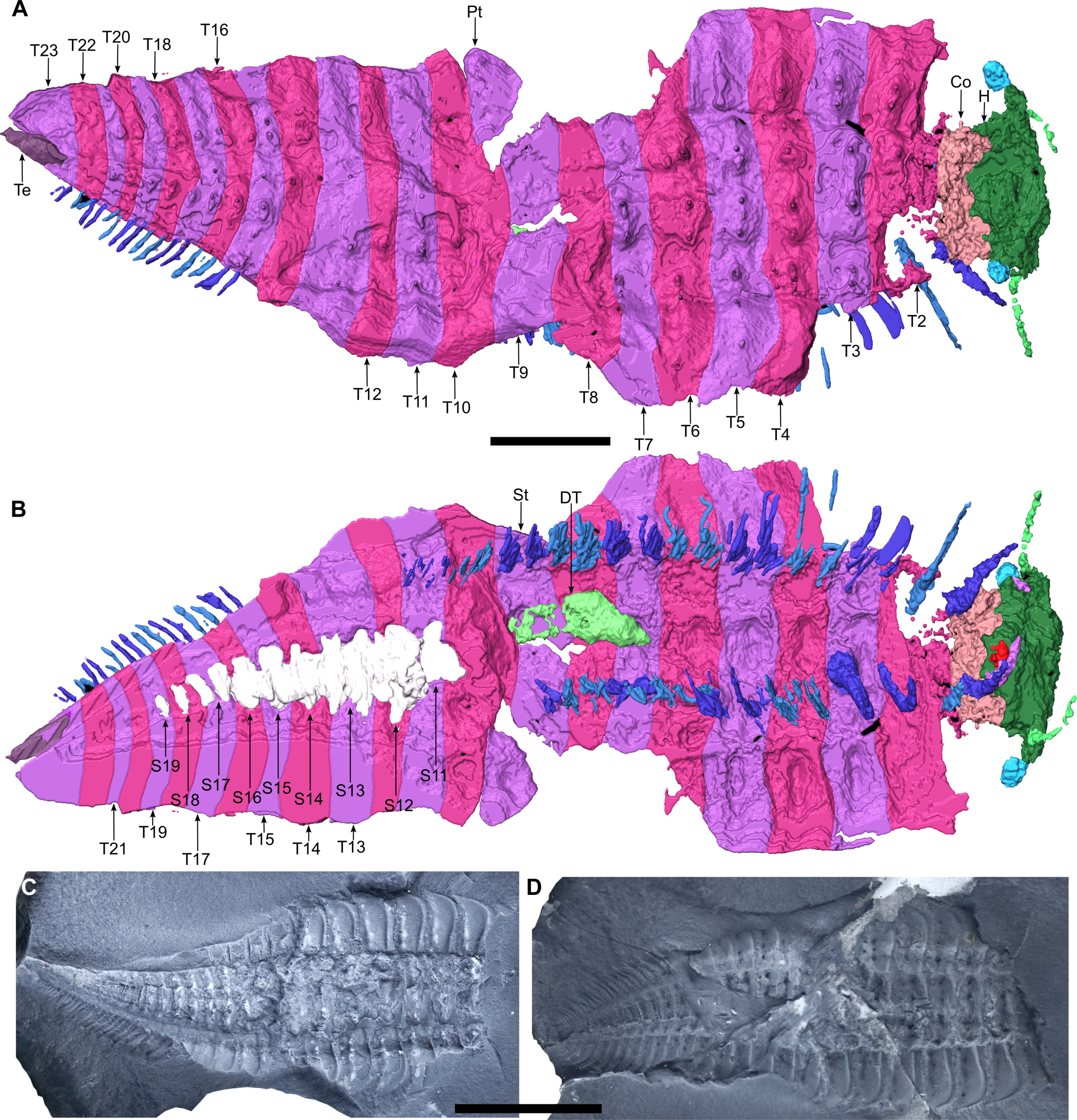
The larger of two exceptionally preserved Arthropleura fossils from Montceau-les-Mines (France), showing the head region (including the antennae and stalked eyes), as well as legs (two pairs per body segment), from Lhéritier et al. (2024).

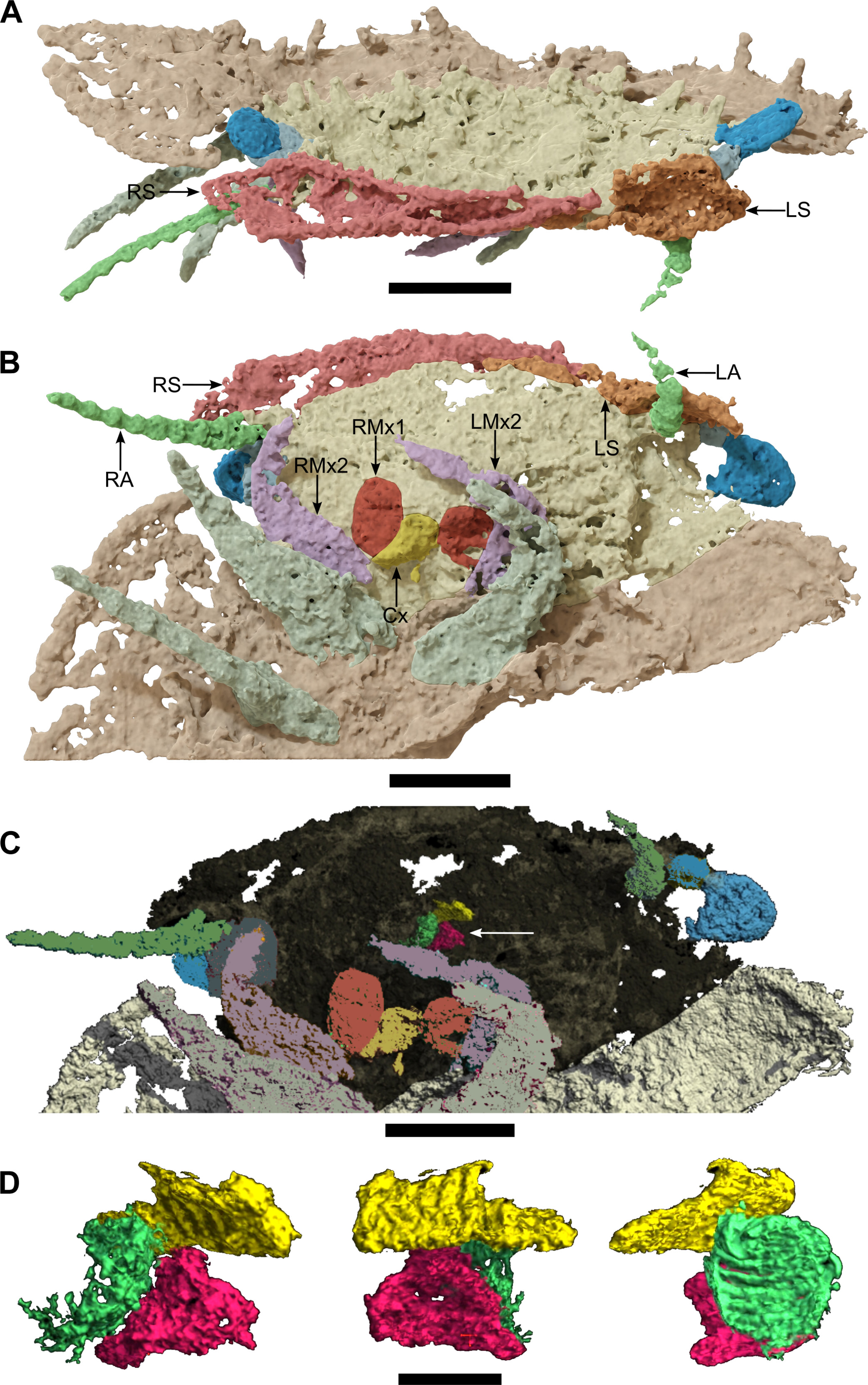
Detail of the previous fossil, showing the head in greater resolution, from Lhéritier et al. (2024).

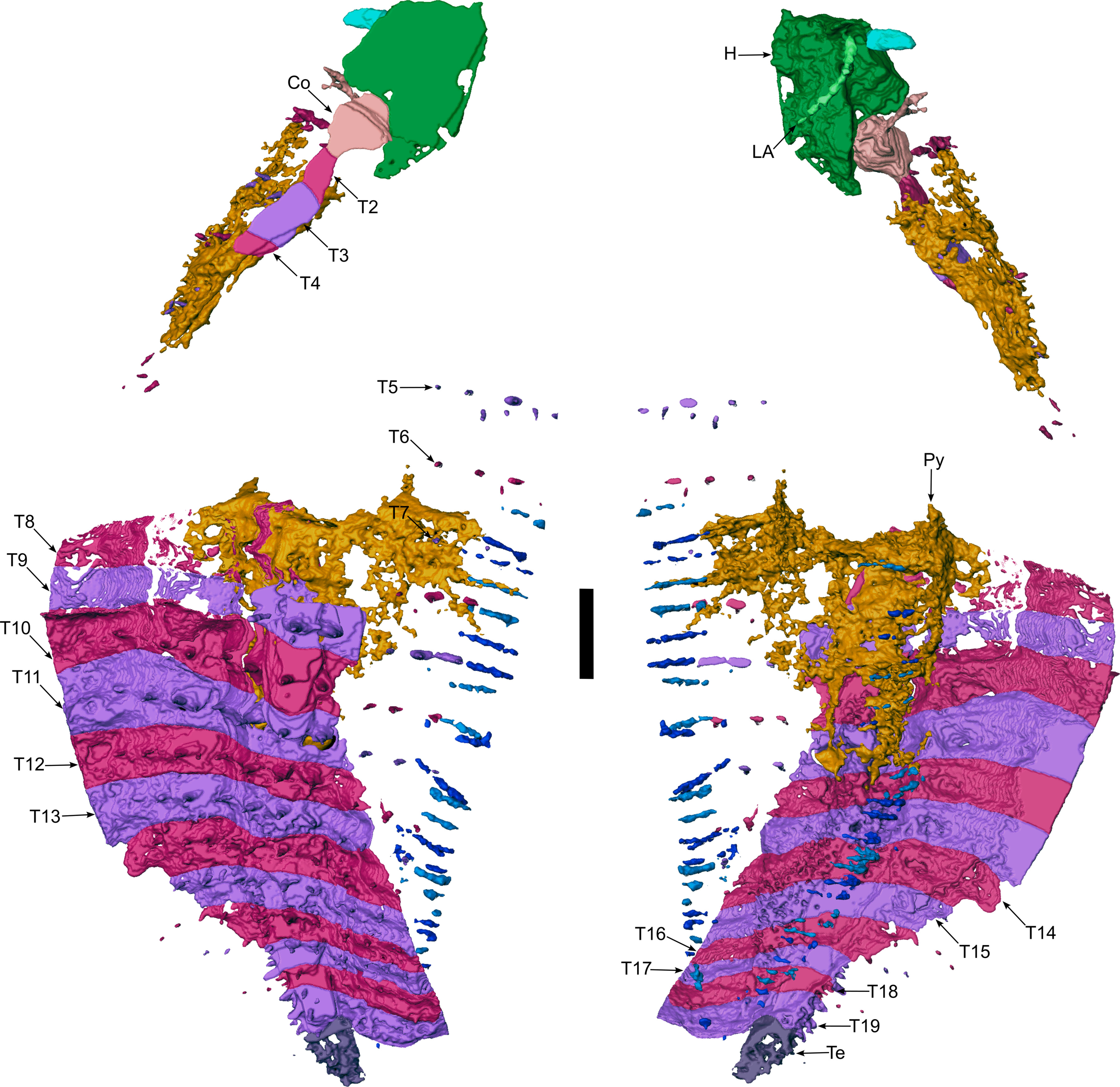
The smaller of the two exceptionally preserved Arthropleura fossils from Montceau-les-Mines, also showing the head region, from Lhéritier et al. (2024).

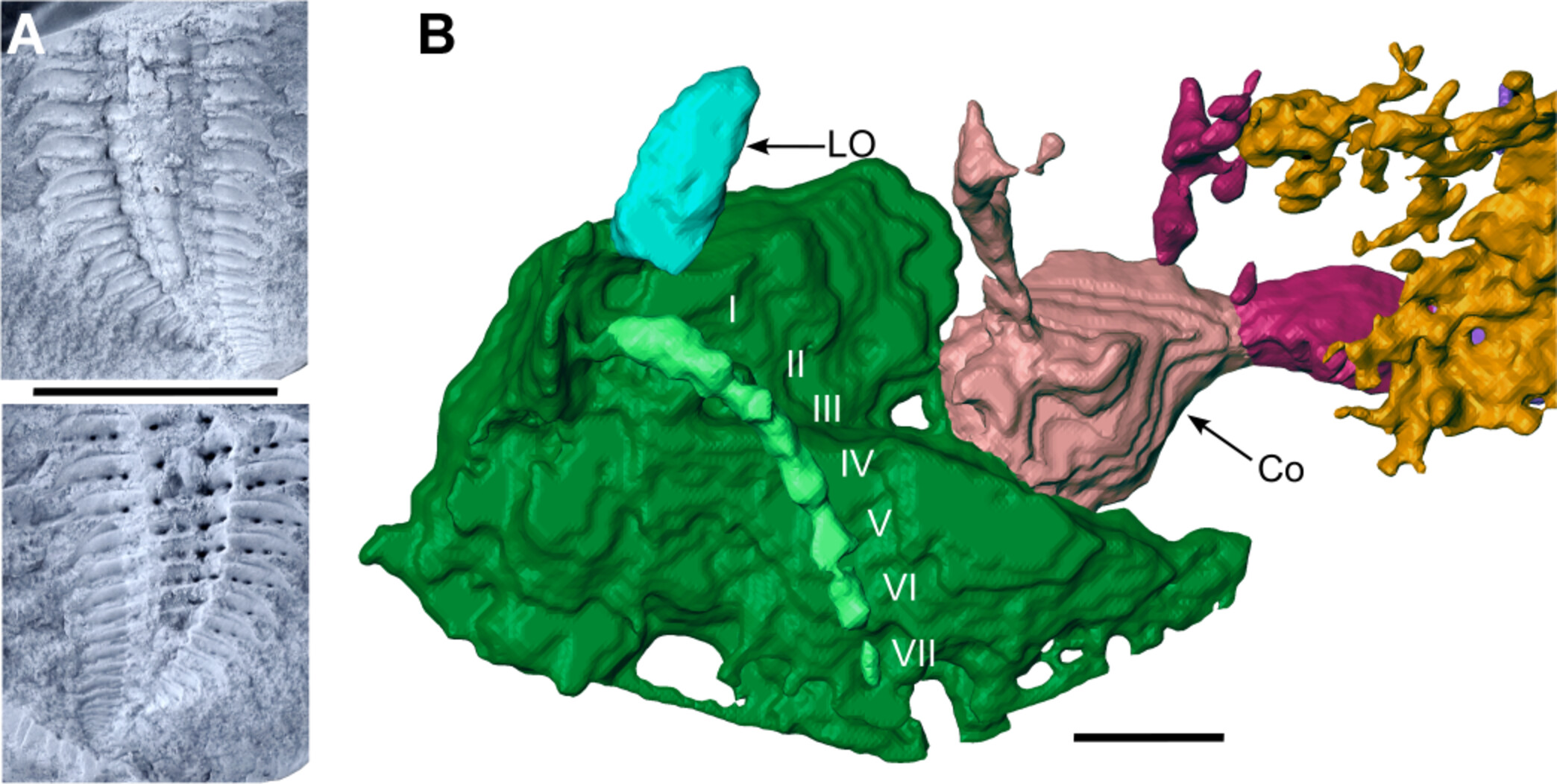
Detail of the smaller of two exceptionally preserved Arthropleura fossils from Montceau-les-Mines (France), showing the head region (including the antennae and stalked eyes), from Lhéritier et al. (2024).

== Morphology ==
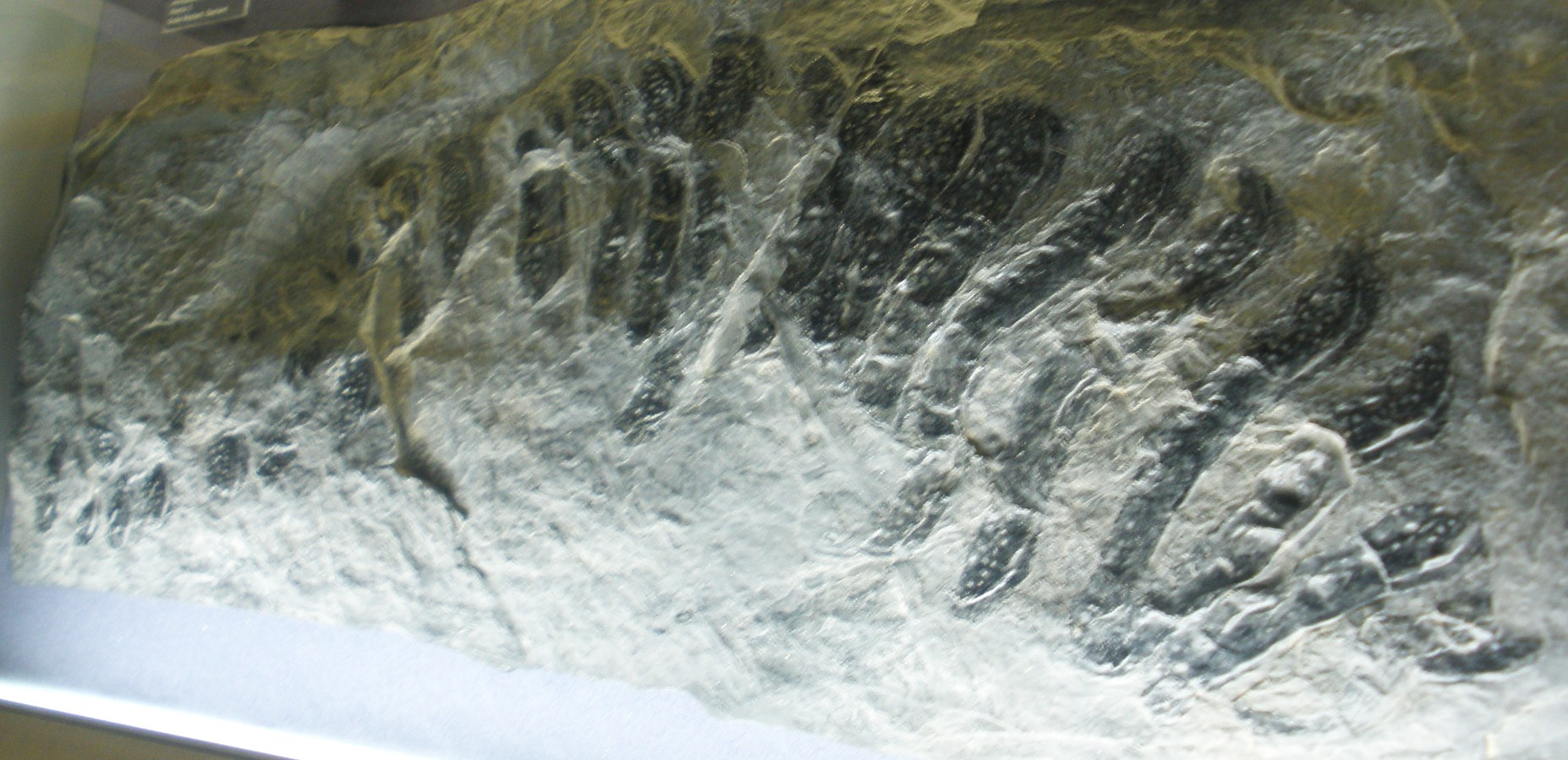
The "Maybach specimen" of Arthropleura armata, a 90-centimetre (35 in) long specimen missing the head and telson.

Multiple partial specimens and trackways suggest that Arthropleura could exceed 2 metres (6 ft 7 in) long. Tracks from Arthropleura up to 50 centimetres (20 in) wide have been found at Joggins, Nova Scotia. In 2021 a fossil, probably a shed exoskeleton (exuviae) of an Arthropleura (indeterminate species, as due to its exposure of only the underside of the carapace, ornamentation cannot be observed), was reported with an estimated width of 55 centimetres (22 in), length of 1.9 metres (6 ft 3 in) to 2.63 metres (8 ft 8 in) and body mass of 50 kg (110 lb). It is one of the largest arthropods ever known, as large as the eurypterid Jaekelopterus rhenaniae, whose length is estimated at 2.33–2.59 metres (7 ft 8 in – 8 ft 6 in). The 2024 study reported the complete head and trunk of a juvenile specimen of Arthropleura sp. (MNHN.F.SOT002123) from Kasimovian (~305 Ma) Montceau-les-Mines lagerstätte, which revealed multiple previously unknown features. Arthropleura had large, flattened ventral sclerites and a pair of antennae with at least seven antennal articles at the front of its head. The trunk anatomy of Arthropleura is characterized by a series of well-developed 28–32 tergites (dorsal exoskeleton) having three lobes like a trilobite, the dorsal surface of which is typically covered by many tubercles or spines. Juvenile specimens have fewer numbers of tergites at 20–24, suggesting hemianamorphic development, with the number of segments reaching their maximum number (adding during each moult) before the final moult, the animal continuing to grow while retaining the same number of segments past a certain point. Arthropleura would have had pleurites, paired sclerites between the sternite and tergite on either side of the body. They would have been beneath the paratergites and above the legs, held in place by arthrodial membrane. Pleurites have been identified in a number of specimens (such as in the Maybach specimen) as oval-shaped plates with rough granulose ornamentation, and would have provided an attachment point for trunk musculature.

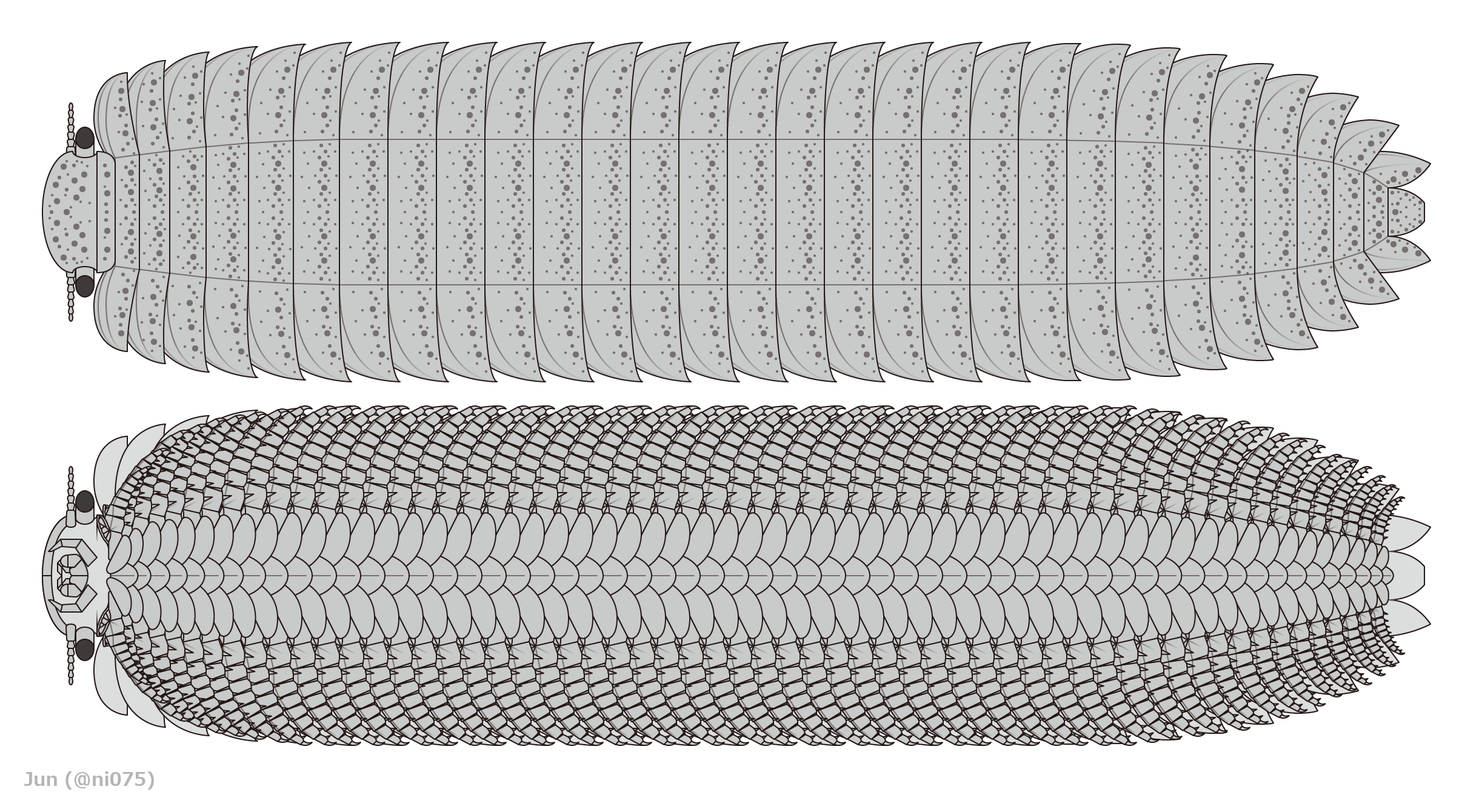
Diagrammatic reconstruction of A. armata

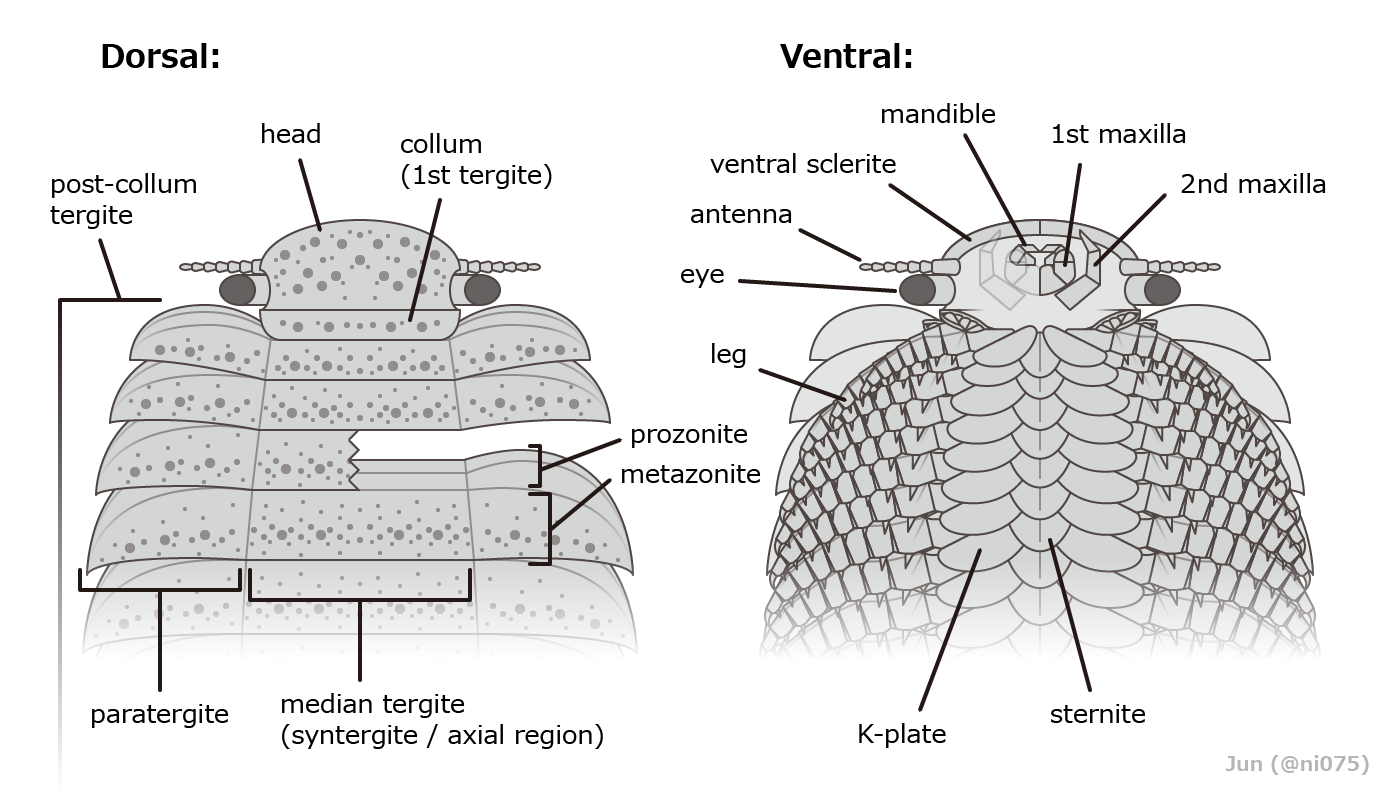
Anterior morphology of A. armata, with details of the head drawn from A. sp. from Montceau-les-Mines

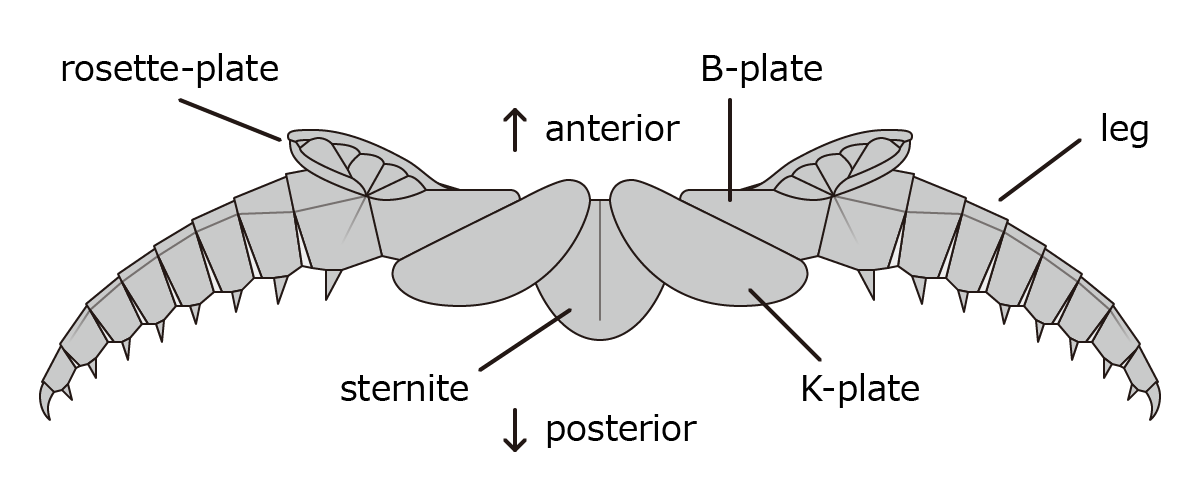
Leg and associated structures of A. armata

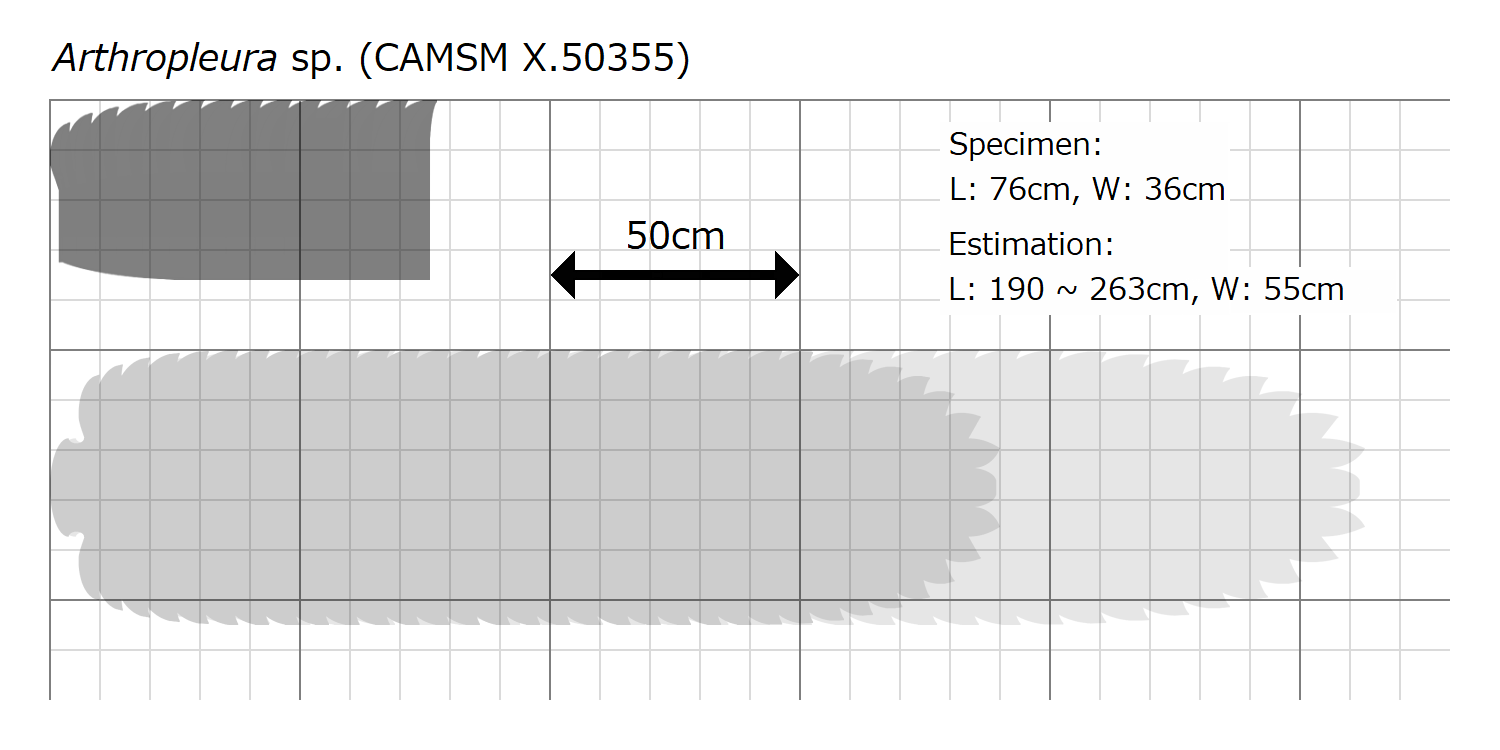
Size estimation of the largest specimen of Arthropleura

Arthropleura had two pairs of maxillae appendages beneath the head, each composed of three segments (podomeres). Their morphology are similar to those of a centipede: the outermost pair (second maxillae) being relatively long and pointed, while the inner pair (first maxillae) were short and plate-like. The paired mandibles were small, composed of three segments, and fully internalized into the head, similar to centipedes rather than millipedes. The segmentation of antennae and mandibles identify it as a millipede, but the presence of a pair of legs underneath its collum, which is absent in present-day species, reveals it as the sister group of the millipede crown group. Unlike any living myriapods, they had stalked compound eyes, which despite also being known from the extinct stem-myriapod group Euthycarcinoidea, appears to be a derived trait evolved independently from the euthycarcinoids. Each body segment bore two pairs of walking legs, which themselves are composed of 9 or 10 segments (podomeres). A crease ran down each side of the leg which probably allowed for stronger muscle attachment as an apodeme, and the ventral surface bore paired setae on each segment. The anterior surface of the leg was smooth, while the posterior surface was tuberculate, with many pores that housed sensory setae.

Around each walking leg pair, there were three pairs of ventral plates located alongside the median sternite, namely K-plates, B-plates, and rosette plates, and either the B-plates or K-plates were thought to be respiratory organs. This has however also been questioned, with Rolfe and Ingham (1967) considering all of these plates to be simply sclerotized ventral integument responsible for reinforcing and buttressing the limb bases to enable locomotion for such a large animal. Wilson (1999) disagreed with this interpretation, stating that the K-plate was actually sac-shaped with a hollow interior. The outer surface of the K-plate was covered in pitted setae, and the interior of the K-plate was reticulate, possibly serving as a respiratory organ. In this case, movement of the limbs would have helped pump hemolymph in and out of the respiratory apparatus. The K-plate is covered with pierced tubercules, which may represent spiracle openings into the respiratory bag-like internal structure of the K-plate. The rosette plate is divided into small triangular lobes - the creases between them probably functioned as internal apodemes, muscule attachment for the limbs. The B-plate, which may be homologous with the coxa or basal leg segment in other arthropods, is continuous with the rosette plate. The placement of all these plates in front of the limb also suggests the legs would thrust backward and downward during movement, before returning to their standard position, with little capacity for movement forward. The body terminated with a small, tuberculate, trapezoidal telson.

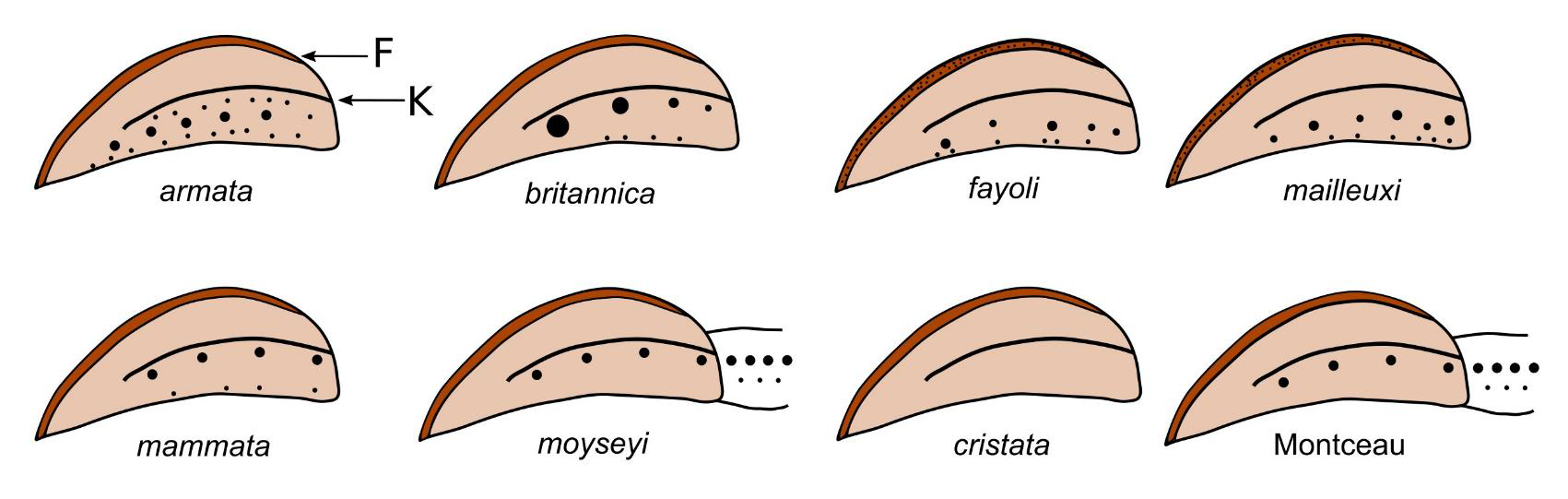
Tubercule patterns of different Arthropleura species, from Lhéritier et al. (2024). The Montceau species is only identified at the genus-level and not assigned to a species name, though it almost certaintly represents a new species.

The different species of Arthropleura are primarily differentiated by the dorsal ornamentation of their tergites. There is a keel across the middle of the tergites running laterally in all species, and typically, there is a line of large tubercules running behind it. The only exception is A. cristata from the Mazon Creek of the United States, where tuberculate ornamentation is absent. Because complete specimens are rare, species are sometimes poorly delineated, and could possibly represent different growth stages of a smaller number of species, leading paleontologists who work with Arthropleura to often only give a genus-level identification to the fossils. The Montceau-les-Mines species (known from only juvenile specimens) has a band of 4 large tubercules on the paratergal lobe, which rise up into tall spines. This pattern is extremely similar to A. moyseyi, which suggests that A. moyseyi is also a juvenile, possibly of A. mammata. Because the ornamentation may change over time, it is not viewed as a reliable way to determine species. At Montceau-les-Mines, large specimens are absent, and the largest trackways were left by animals less than 50 centimetres (20 in) in length, so this species may have been genuinely much smaller than the giant species elsewhere in Europe.

== Paleobiology ==
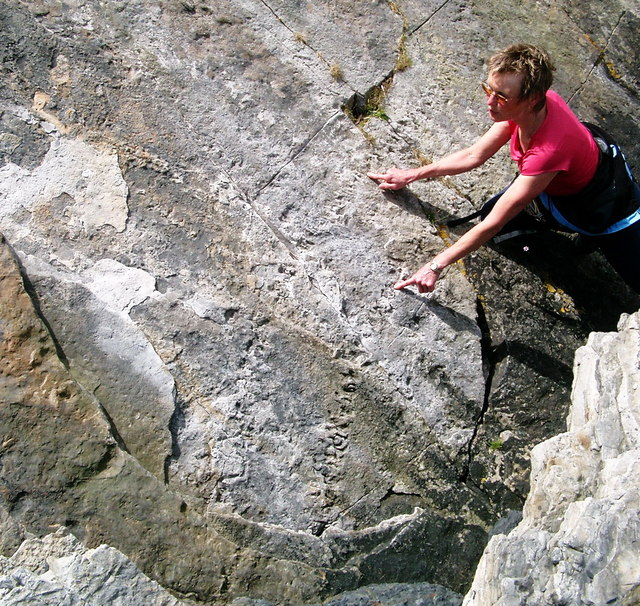
Fossil footprints of Arthropleura, Laggan Harbour, Isle of Arran, Great Britain. This trail is the type specimen of the ichnospecies Diplichnites cuithensis.

Most fossils of Arthropleura are believed to represent exuviae (moulted shells) instead of carcasses. Arthropleura has typically been reconstructed living in coal swamps, based on the co-occurrence of its fossils with dense plant remains and coal veins. However, this view is no longer strictly supported. Many fossils of Arthropleura are found either before or after the dominance of such coal forests, and direct geological and paleobotanical evidence suggests its primary habitat was far more open. Arthropleura preferred open environments, particularly sparsely wooded and near to water, such as coastlines and floodplains. Arthropleura is also found in association with tetrapod trackways suggesting they lived in the same environments. In addition to large trackways, enormous burrows have been attributed to Arthropleura and arthropleurids generally, suggested to be made during periods of aestivation similar to hibernation. Arthropleura remains (body fossils and trackways) are also closely associated with the palaeoequator, with all documented fossils occurring with 10° of either side of the palaeoequator during both the Carboniferous and Permian.

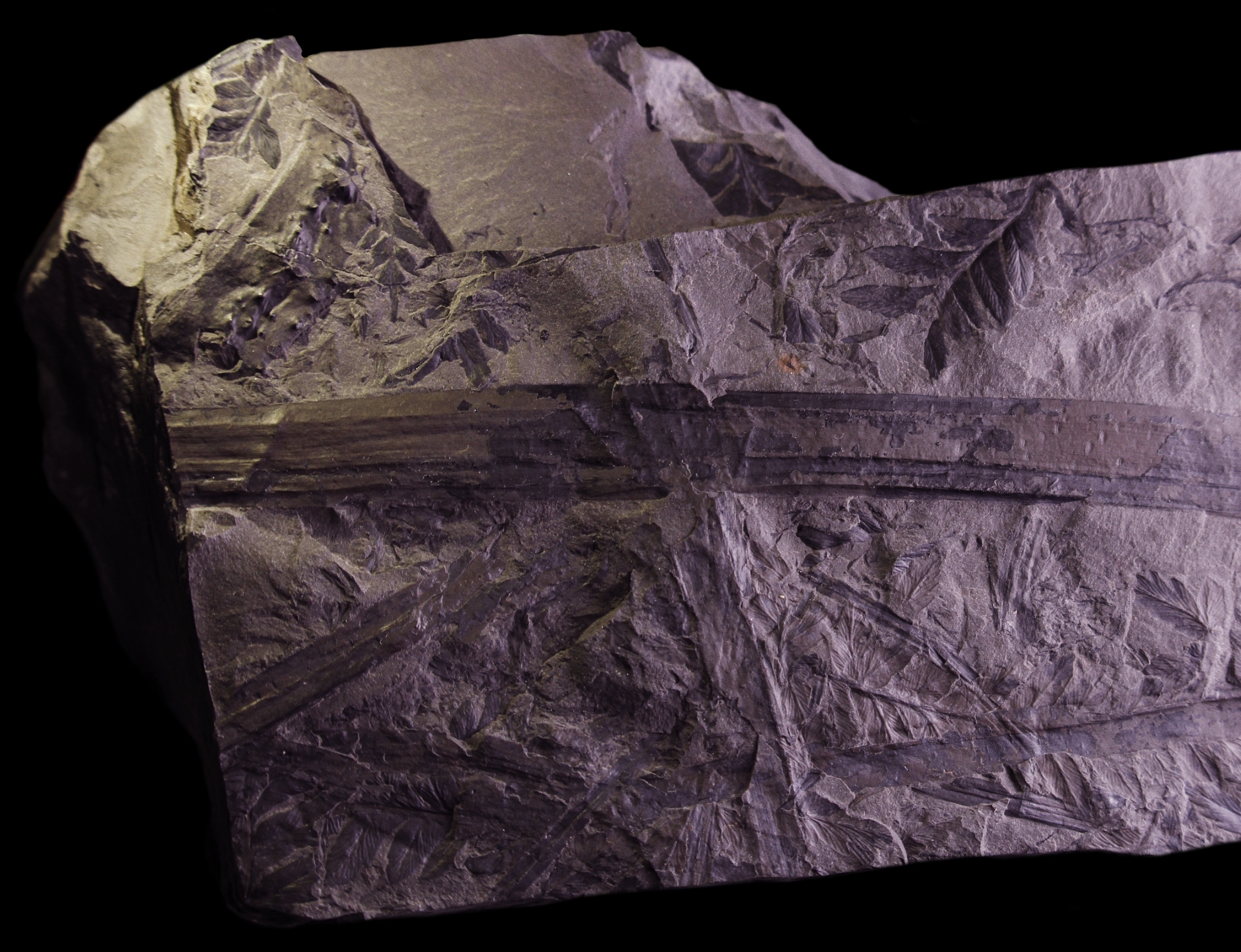
A fossil tergite (axial region) of Arthropleura sp. from the Carboniferous of Poland, surrounded by various fossil plants.

Arthropleura has repeatedly been suggested to have been amphibious to some degree. Despite falling out of favour for many years, this idea has been bolstered by new evidence. Trackways, often found in association with coastlines, are found in both submerged and emergent substrates, showing that Arthropleura was probably capable of walking in air and in shallow water, and did so accordingly. Additional evidence for this comes from the juvenile Montceau fossils, which demonstrate that the eyes were large and stalked, unlike any living myriapod. This condition is however known in the likely stem-myriapod group Euthycarcinoidea (with which Arthropleura sometimes co-occurs), which were aquatic to amphibious. This could point to a semi-aquatic, amphibious lifestyle, capable of entering and exiting shallow bodies of water. It has been suggested that due to their large size, moulting (a stressful period even for smaller arthropods) probably occurred underwater, allowing its weight to be supported while its new exoskeleton hardened. Wilson favoured a more terrestrial habit for Arthropleura, with no obvious mechanism for the animal to breathe underwater. She suggested that during moulting, Arthropleura could have behaved like modern Scolopendra centipedes, moving in a worm-like fashion without use of their softened legs until they were hardened. She suggested the moulting could have been undertaken inside constructed burrows, although remained open to Rolfe's (1985) theory that moulting was done inside hollow lycopod tree trunks, aided by their naturally high humidity which could have prevented the animal from rapidly drying out.

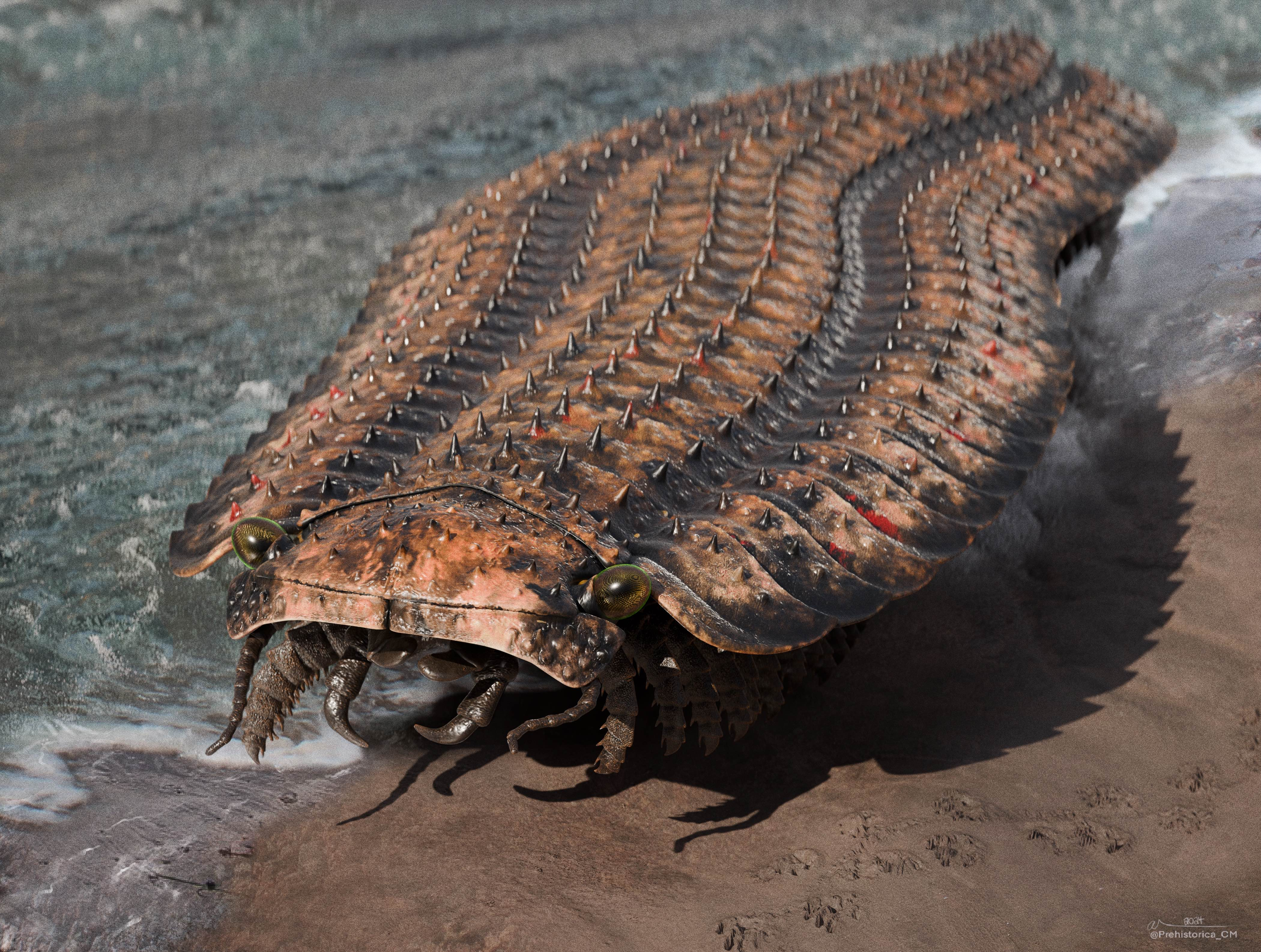
Life restoration of Arthropleura walking along a sandy beach.

The diet of Arthropleura has also been heavily debated. Waterlot suggested it was a carnivore, but the holotype of A. moyseyi was suggested to preserve the original gut contents, a mix of woody plant material, suggesting it was an herbivore. The interpretation of these fossils as gut contents is no longer supported. Currently, Arthropleura is believed to be a detritivore, like most extant millipedes. This means feeding on either dead and decaying plant matter or animal remains when available. The short, closely packed legs, as well as evidence from the morphology of the ichnofossil trackways, both suggest that Arthropleura was a very slow moving animal, and the lack of venomous forcipules or other predatory adaptions to the limbs basically precludes a predatory lifestyle.

The giant size of Arthropleura has been frequently attributed to higher oxygen levels during the Carboniferous. However, this does not align with the fossil record or modern understanding of arthropod size range. Arthropleura reaches giant sizes before the rise in oxygen concentration during the Carboniferous, with the largest known body fossil found in an interval where oxygen levels were only about 23%, which is only slightly higher than the modern day. More likely, Arthropleura was capable of gigantism due to other generally favourable environmental and ecological conditions and lack of serious competition. Consequently, Arthropleura went extinct during the early Permian, probably due to the desertification of the equatorial regions of the supercontinent and competition with Permian tetrapods.

== See also ==
- Diplichnites
- Largest prehistoric animals
