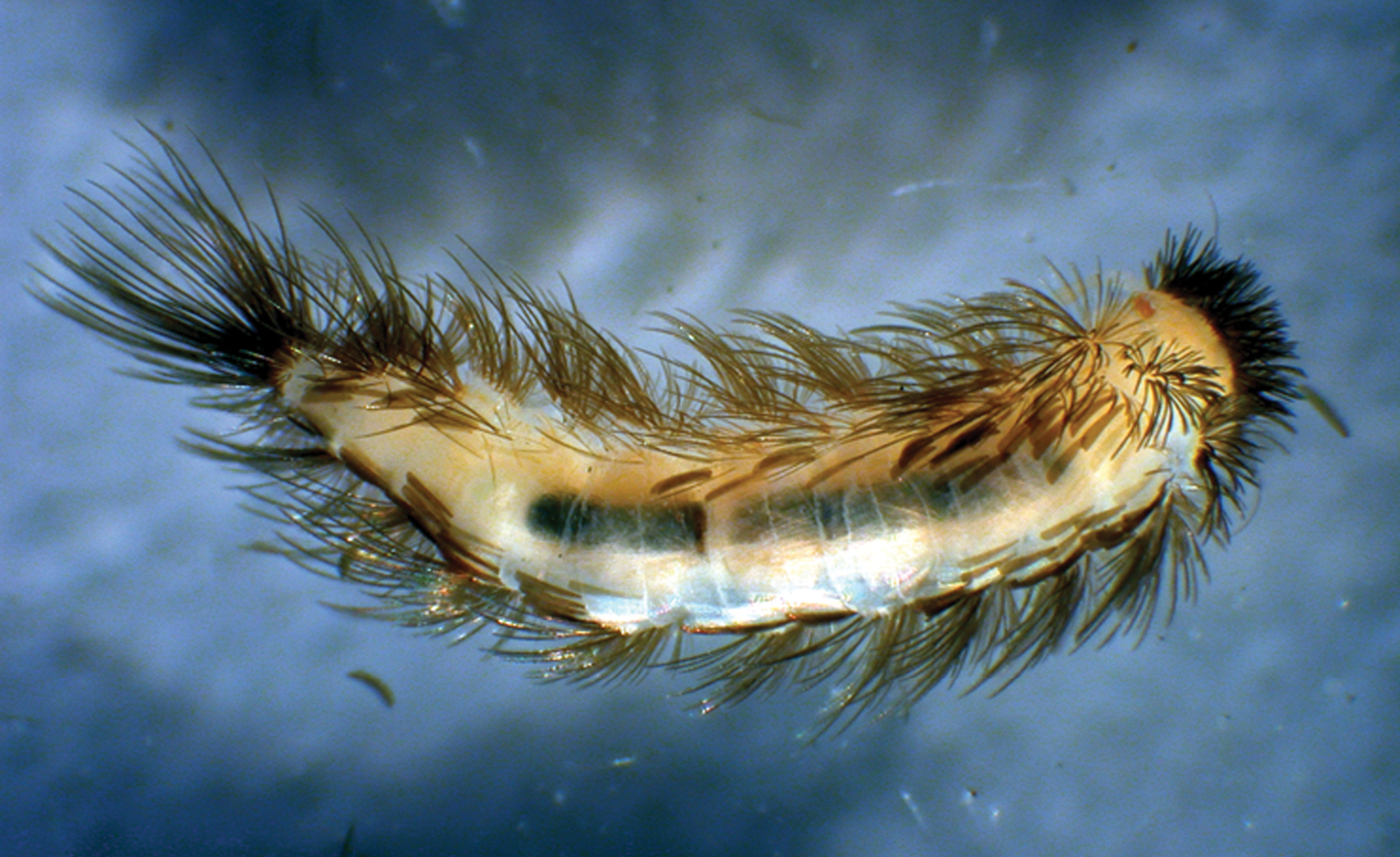
- Phryssonotus brevicapensis from South Africa

Scientific classification
- Kingdom: Animalia
- Phylum: Arthropoda
- Subphylum: Myriapoda
- Class: Diplopoda
- Order: Polyxenida
- Family: Synxenidae
- Genus: Phryssonotus; Scudder, 1885

Synonyms
- Lophonotus Menge, 1854; Synxenus Silvestri, 1900; Kubanus Attems, 1926; Schindalmonotus Attems, 1926; Koubanus Attems, 1928

= Phryssonotus =

Phryssonotus Temporal range: Cenomanian–Present

Genus of millipedes

Phryssonotus is a genus of bristle millipedes containing around nine extant species. Species are characterized by the possession of dark, rear-projecting scale-shaped bristles (trichomes) on the tergites; all other bristles are long and hairlike. Adults in this genus have 17 pairs of legs, except for the species Phryssonotus brevicapensis, in which they have only 15 pairs of legs.

== Species ==
- Phryssonotus brevicapensis
- Phryssonotus burmiticus
- Phryssonotus capensis
- Phryssonotus chilensis
- Phryssonotus cubanus
- Phryssonotus hystrix
- Phryssonotus novaehollandiae
- Phryssonotus orientalis
- Phryssonotus platycephalus
- †Phryssonotus burmiticus Cockerell 1917 Burmese amber, Myanmar, Cenomanian
- †Phryssonotus hystrix Menge 1854 Baltic amber, Eocene
