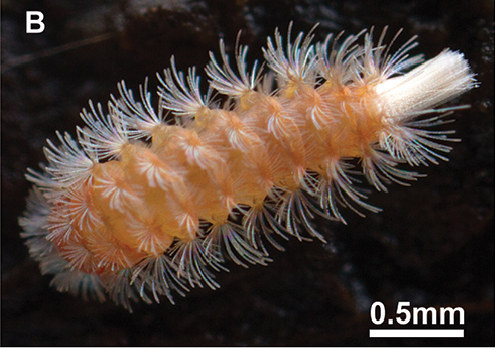
- Lophoturus boondallus

Scientific classification
- Kingdom: Animalia
- Phylum: Arthropoda
- Subphylum: Myriapoda
- Class: Diplopoda
- Order: Polyxenida
- Family: Lophoproctidae
- Genus: Lophoturus; Brölemann, 1931

Type species
- Lophoturus obscurus Brölemann, 1931

Diversity
- Approx. 27 species

= Lophoturus =

Genus of millipedes

Lophoturus is a genus of millipedes belonging to the family Lophoproctidae. Species described after year 2000 include two from Queensland, Australia, three from Christmas Island, Australia, and three from the Caribbean and northern South America.

== Species ==
There are approximately 27 species:

- Lophoturus adisi Ishii, Jacquemin-Nguyen Duy & Condé, 1999
- Lophoturus aequatus (Loomis, 1936)
- Lophoturus anisorhabdus (Condé & Terver, 1964)
- Lophoturus boondallus Huynh & Veenstra, 2018
- Lophoturus crassipes Conde & Terver, 1979
- Lophoturus danhomenou (Brölemann, 1926)
- Lophoturus difficilis (Condé & Jacquemin, 1963)
- Lophoturus drifti (Condé & Terver, 1964)
- Lophoturus fluctuans (Condé & Terver, 1964)
- Lophoturus guineensis (Silvestri, 1948)
- Lophoturus hesperius (Condè & Terver, 1963)
- Lophoturus humphreysi Nguyen Duy-Jacquemin 2014
- Lophoturus jianshuiensis Ishii & Yin, 2000
- Lophoturus judsoni Jacquemin-Nguyen Duy, 2002
- Lophoturus longisetis (Pocock, 1894)
- Lophoturus madecassus (Marquet & Condé, 1950)
- Lophoturus molloyensis Huynh & Veenstra, 2018
- Lophoturus monserratensis Jacquemin-Nguyen Duy, 2002
- Lophoturus niveus (Loomis, 1934)
- Lophoturus obscurus (Brölemann, 1931)
- Lophoturus okinawai (Nguyen Duy-Jacquemin & Condé, 1982)
- Lophoturus peruanus (Silvestri, 1949)
- Lophoturus quebradanus (Chamberlin, 1955)
- Lophoturus queenslandicus (Verhoeff, 1924)
- Lophoturus speophilus Nguyen Duy-Jacquemin 2014
- Lophoturus sturmi Jacquemin-Nguyen Duy, 2002
- Lophoturus vicarius Conde & Terver, 1979
