= Lophoturus madecassus =

Scientific classification
- Kingdom: Animalia
- Phylum: Arthropoda
- Subphylum: Myriapoda
- Class: Diplopoda
- Order: Polyxenida
- Family: Lophoproctidae
- Genus: Lophoturus
- Species: L. madecassus

Binomial name
- Lophoturus madecassus (Marquet & Condé, 1950)

Synonyms
- Alloproctus madecassus Marquet & Condé, 1950

Species of millipede

Lophoturus madecassus is a species of bristle millipede in the family Lophoproctidae. Adults in this species, unlike those in all other species in this family, feature only 11 pairs of legs rather than the typical 13 leg pairs. With only 11 leg pairs in adults, this species features the minimum number of legs recorded in any adult millipede. This species has a broad circumtropical distribution.

== Discovery ==
This species was first described in 1950 by M.L. Marguet and Bruno Condé. They based the original description of this species on three female adults found in 1947 in a park in the city of Toliara in Madagascar. In 1982, Monique Nguyen Duy-Jacquemin and Condé redescribed this species based on an adult male, eight adults females, and twelve immature specimens in various stages of development, all found on islands in the Pacific Ocean. This redescription includes the first record of a male specimen of this millipede. Two adult females and one immature specimen were collected in Tonga, but all the other specimens were collected on the coral atoll of Suwarrow in the Cook Islands.

== Taxonomy ==
Marguet and Condé originally described this species in 1950 under the name Alloproctus madecassus. In 1977, however, Condé and Nguyen Duy-Jacquemin deemed Alloproctus to be a junior synonym of Lophoturus. Since then, authorities have accepted Lophoturus madecassus as the valid name for this species.

== Distribution ==
This species has a distribution that includes tropical localities all around the world. This millipede has been recorded not only in Madagascar, Tonga, and the Cook Islands but also in Florida, Jamaica, Cape Verde, Ivory Coast, the Sahara desert in southern Algeria, Barrow Island, and mainland Australia. In Australia, all records are from the northwestern corner of the state of Western Australia.

== Ecology ==
This millipede has been found in Casuarina leaf litter and in soil among Amaryllis roots on Loggerhead Key in Dry Tortugas National Park in Florida, in plant litter and woody debris under a termite nest in a tree in Jamaica, in tropical forest litter in Tonga, and in palm forest litter in the Cook Islands. Although other specimens were collected from plant litter, specimens on Barrow Island were found at some depth below the surface. Given the widespread distribution of this species, authorities suspect that this millipede has been introduced by humans or spread by birds with bristle millipedes entangled in their feathers.

== Description ==
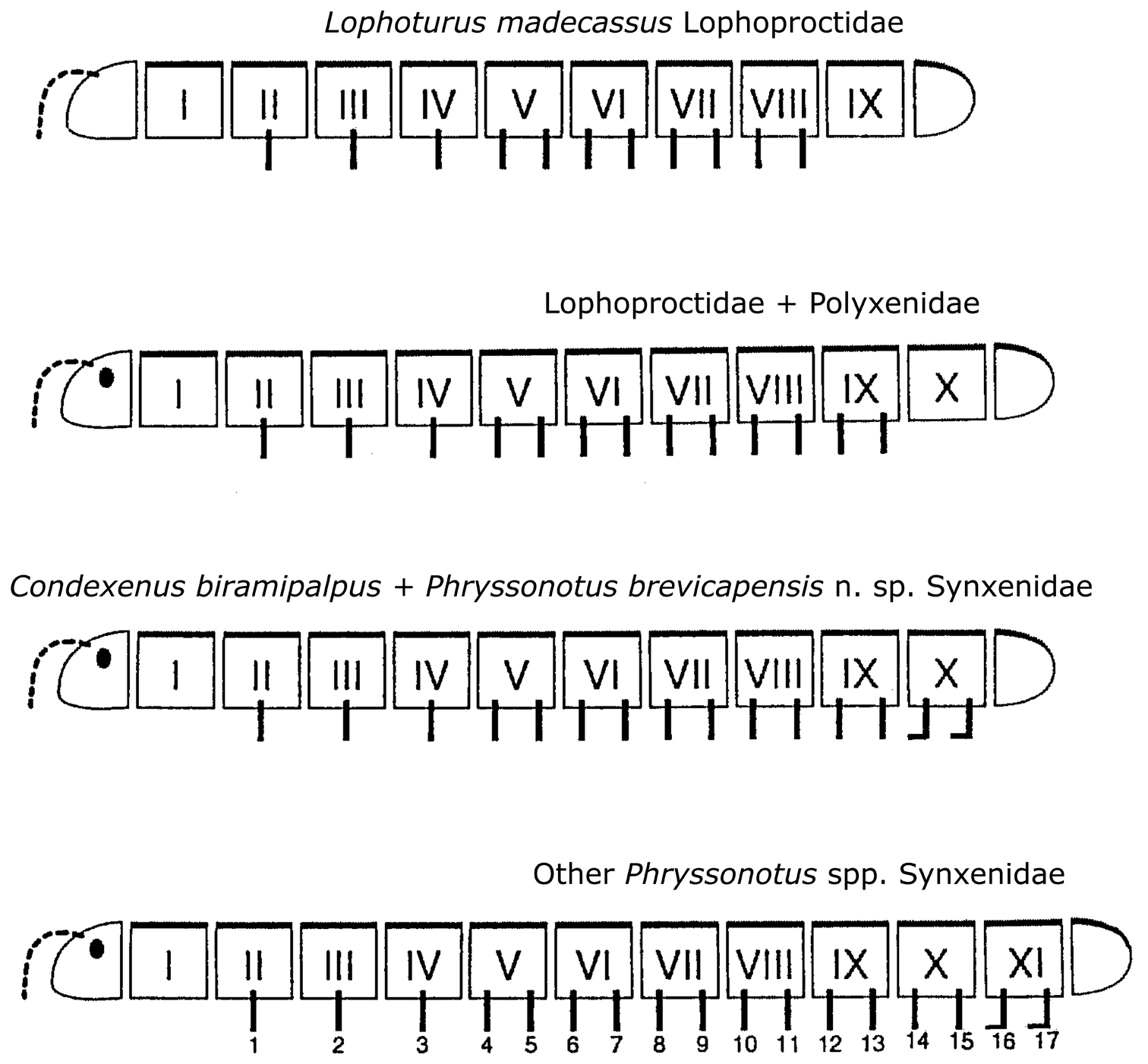
Segmentation of Lophoturus madecassus (top) compared to other millipedes of order Polyxenida

Adults of this species can range from 1.2 mm to 2.1 mm in length, excluding the tuft at the posterior end of the body. This species is the only millipede in the order Polyxenida to feature 11 pairs of legs, which adults of this species have at the end of anamorphosis. All other species in this order go from a stage of development with 10 leg pairs to the next stage with 12 leg pairs, then ultimately emerge with at least 13 leg pairs in the adult stage. Adults in this species also feature only 9 tergites rather than the 10 or 11 tergites observed in other adults in this order.

== Development ==
Like other species in this order, this millipede grows and develops through a series of molts, adding segments and legs until reaching a fixed number in the adult stage. Adults continue to molt, but they do not add segments or legs. This mode of development is known as hemianamorphosis.

All seven stages of development in this species are known from specimens. Juveniles hatch in the first stage with only 3 leg pairs, emerge with 4 pairs in the second stage, 5 pairs in the third stage, 6 pairs in the fourth stage, 8 pairs in the fifth stage, and 10 pairs in the sixth stage, and then emerge as adults with 11 pairs in the seventh stage. This pattern differs from the stages of development usually observed in this order by omitting an eighth stage and adding only one leg pair rather than two leg pairs in the seventh stage.
