= Monographis =

Scientific classification
- Kingdom: Animalia
- Phylum: Arthropoda
- Subphylum: Myriapoda
- Class: Diplopoda
- Order: Polyxenida
- Family: Polyxenidae
- Genus: Monographis; Attems, 1907

Genus of millipede

Monographis is a terrestrial genus of millipede in the family Polyxenidae comprising 10 species.

== Description ==
Similarly to other genera in Polyxenidae, Monographis millipedes are covered in characteristic Setae which they use in defense against predators (primarily ants). They are very small, typically ranging from 1.5-4mm.

== Species ==
- Monographis annandalei (Silvestri, 1948)
- Monographis baihualingensis Ishii & Yin, 2000
- Monographis condorensis Huynh & Veenstra, 2020
- Monographis demangei Jacquemin-Nguyen Duy & Condé, 1967
- Monographis kraepelini Attems, 1907
- Monographis mirus (Turk, 1947)
- Monographis queenslandicus Huynh & Veenstra, 2013
- Monographis schulzei Attems, 1909
- Monographis tamoyoensis Schubart, 1939
- Monographis yunnanensis Ishii & Yin, 2000
