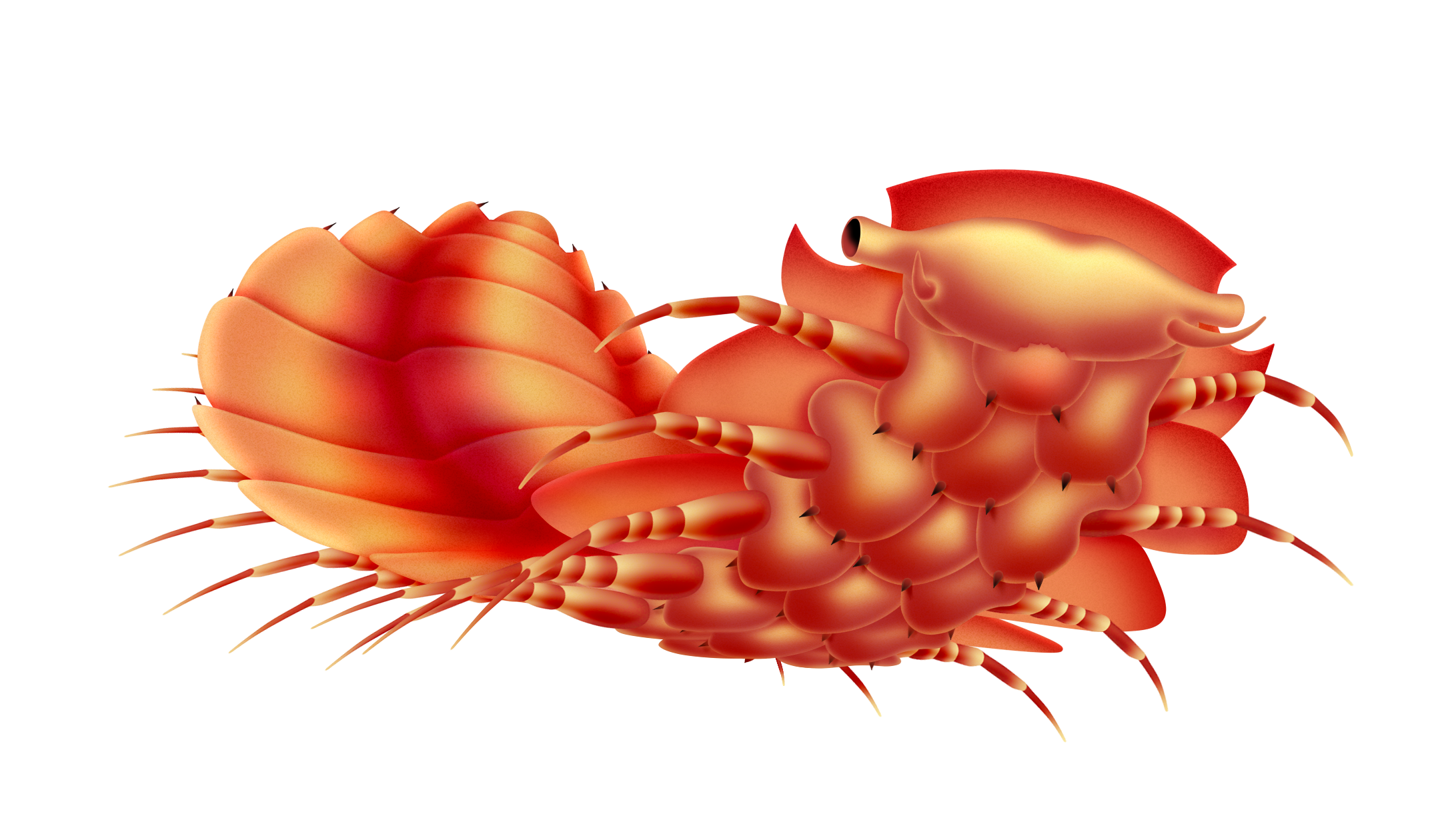
- Life restoration

Scientific classification
- Kingdom: Animalia
- Phylum: Arthropoda
- Subphylum: Myriapoda
- Class: Diplopoda
- Subclass: Chilognatha (?)
- Order: †Microdecemplicida; Wilson & Shear, 2000
- Family: †Microdecemplicidae; Wilson & Shear, 2000
- Genus: †Microdecemplex; Wilson & Shear, 2000
- Species: †M. rolfei

Binomial name
- †Microdecemplex rolfei Wilson & Shear, 2000

= Microdecemplex =

Microdecemplex Temporal range: Middle Devonian (Early Givetian–earliest Frasnian), 387.5–382 Ma

Extinct genus of millipedes

Microdecemplex rolfei is the only known species of the extinct, small-bodied millipede order Microdecemplicida. This order was considered on its original description as a member of the extinct subclass Arthropleuridea, but a 2024 study suggested it belonged instead to the subclass Chilognatha. Fossils, measuring less than 5 mm in length, are known from the Panther Mountain Formation of New York State, dating to the Middle Devonian. This species apparently lacks antennae and shows sexual dimorphism in its hind legs, which may be similar in function to the telopods of male living pill-millipedes that are used to grasp females during mating.
