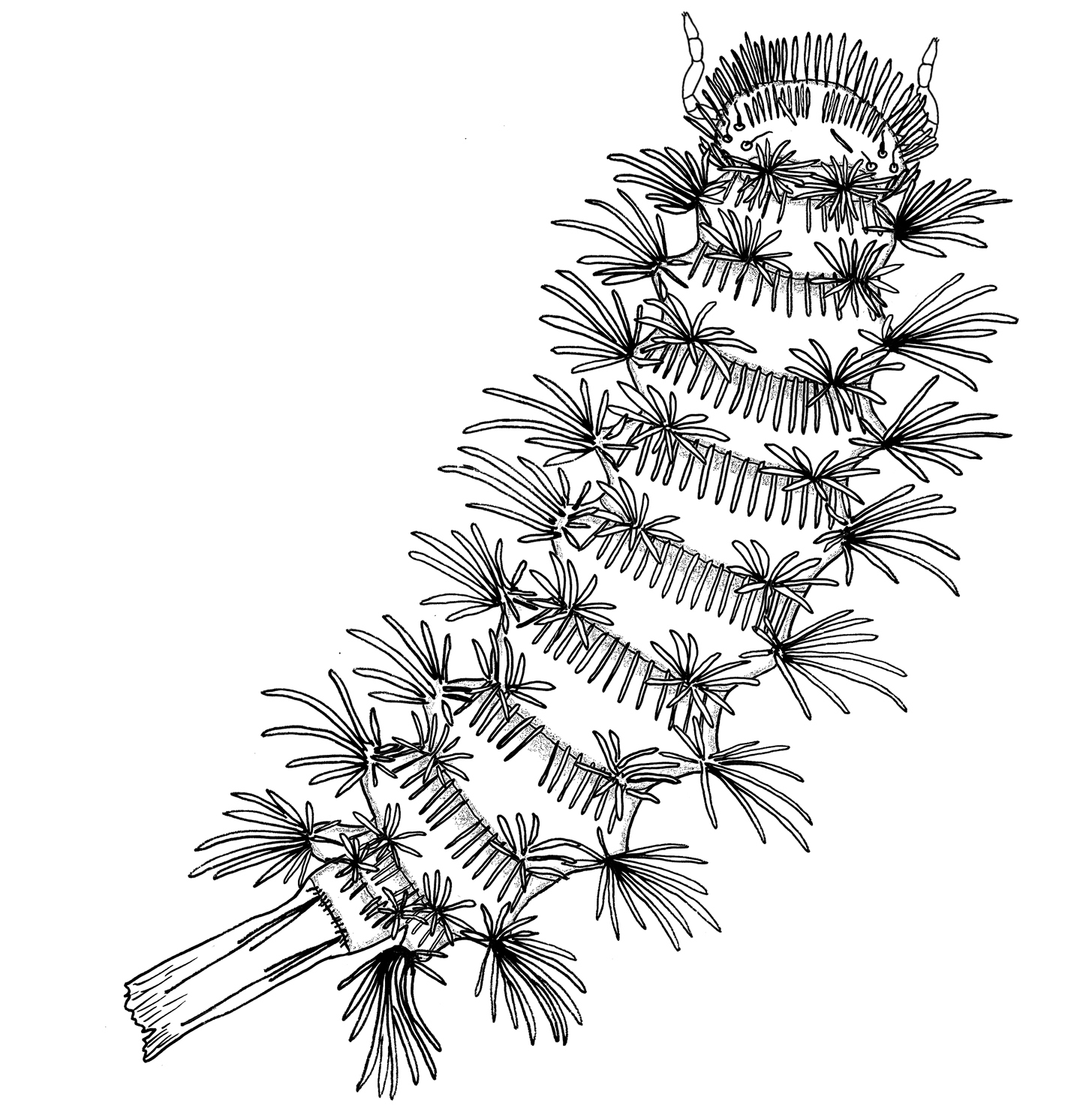
- Lophoproctus coecus

Scientific classification
- Kingdom: Animalia
- Phylum: Arthropoda
- Subphylum: Myriapoda
- Class: Diplopoda
- Order: Polyxenida
- Family: Lophoproctidae; Silvestri, 1897

= Lophoproctidae =

Family of millipedes

Lophoproctidae is a family of millipedes in the order Polyxenida containing approximately 43 species in 6 genera.

== Description ==
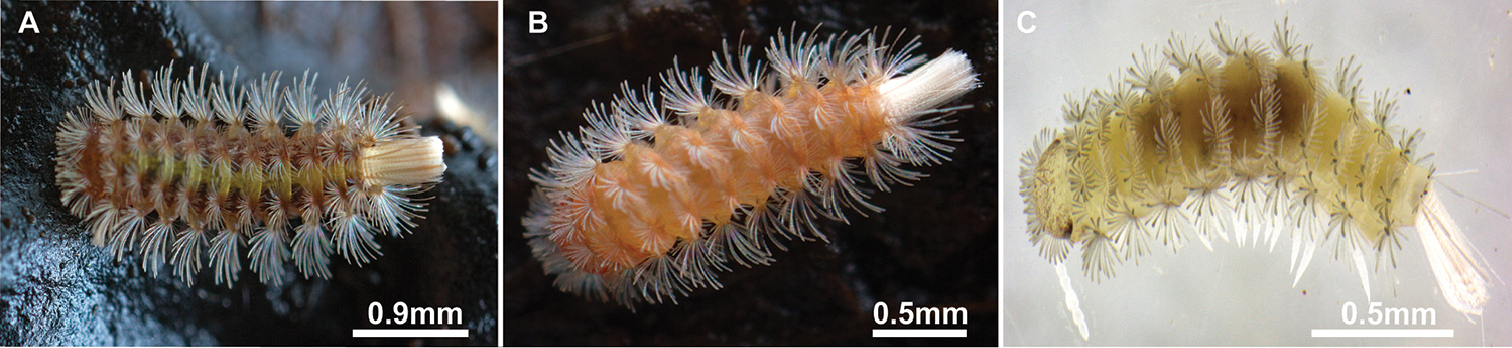
Three Lophoturus species from Queensland, Australia: (A) L. queenslandicus, (B) L. boondallus, (C) L. molloyensis

Lophoproctids are distinguished by a soft body, bearing bristles at the posterior end of each diplosegment; they are blind and generally lack pigmentation. Individuals are small, ranging in size from 1.2 to 4.2 mm. Adults have 13 pairs of legs with internal leg buds, except for those in one species (Lophoturus madecassus), which have only 11 pairs of legs.

== Genera ==
As of 2025, the family contains the following genera:

- Alloproctoides Marquet & Condé, 1950
- Ancistroxenus Schubart, 1947
- Barroxenus Chamberlin, 1940
- Lophoproctinus Silvestri, 1948
- Lophoproctus Pocock, 1895
- Lophoturus Brölemann, 1931
