= Eoarthropleura =

Eoarthropleura Temporal range: Pridoli–Frasnian

Scientific classification
- Kingdom: Animalia
- Phylum: Arthropoda
- Subphylum: Myriapoda
- Class: Diplopoda
- Subclass: †Arthropleuridea
- Order: †Eoarthropleurida; Shear & Selden, 1995
- Family: †Eoarthropleuridae; Størmer, 1976
- Genus: †Eoarthropleura; Størmer, 1976

Species
- E. devonica Størmer, 1976; E. hueberi Kjellesvig-Waering, 1986; E. ludfordensis Shear & Selden, 1995

Synonyms
- Tiphoscorpio Kjellesvig-Waering, 1986

Extinct genus of many-legged arthropods

Eoarthropleura was a genus of millipede-like creatures which lived between the Late Silurian and Late Devonian periods. It reached 100 mm (3.9 in) in length. Fossils, mainly of cuticle fragments, have been found in Europe (Rhineland-Palatinate, Germany and Shropshire, England) and North America (New York, USA and New Brunswick, Canada). It is the earliest known member of the Arthropleuridea, and the oldest known terrestrial animal of North America.
