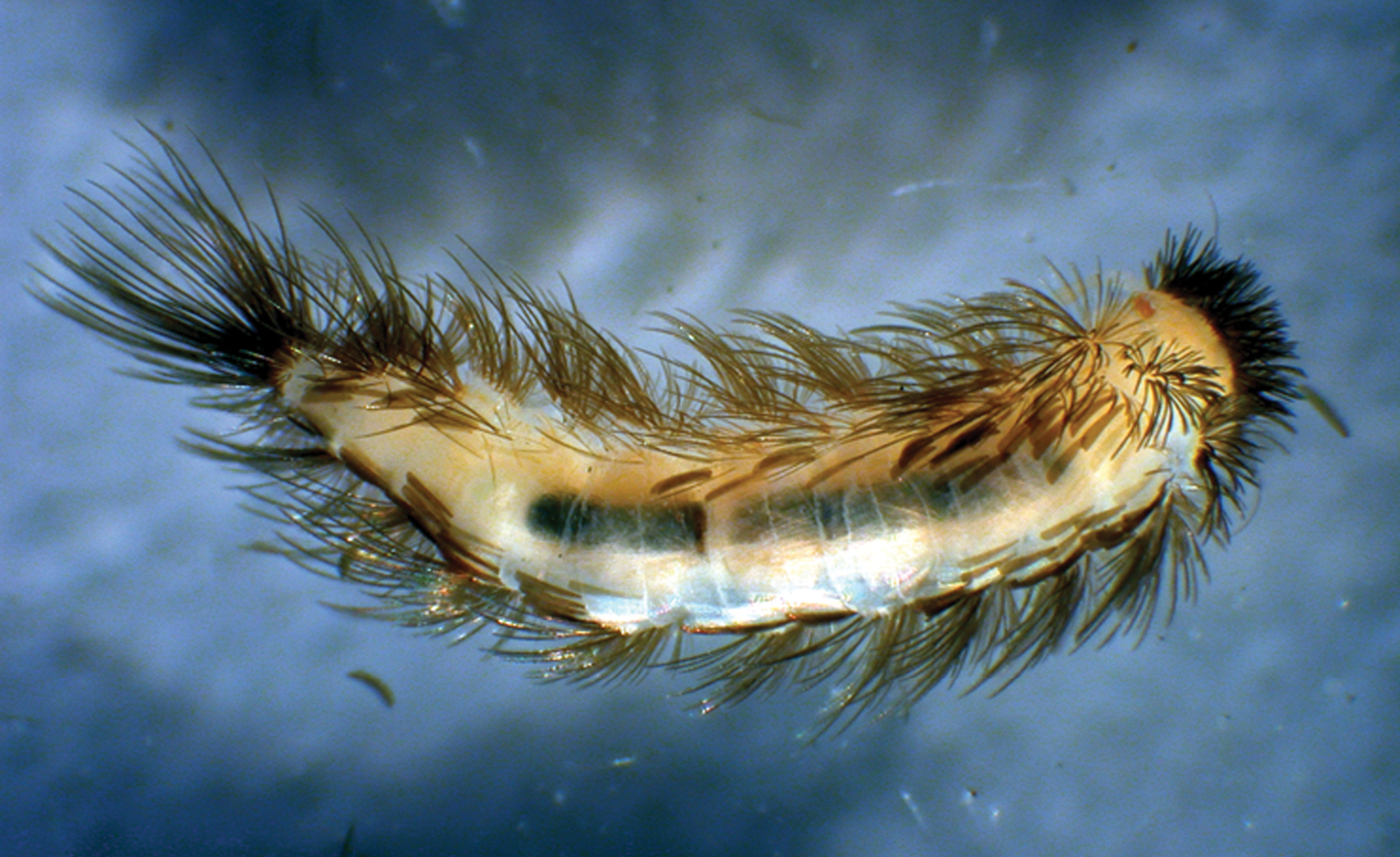
- Phryssonotus brevicapensis

Scientific classification
- Kingdom: Animalia
- Phylum: Arthropoda
- Subphylum: Myriapoda
- Class: Diplopoda
- Order: Polyxenida
- Superfamily: Synxenoidea; Silvestri, 1923
- Family: Synxenidae; Silvestri, 1923

Genera
- Synxenidoidea incertae sedis: Trichoproctus; Synxenidae: Condexenus; Phryssonotus

= Synxenidae =

Synxenidae Temporal range: Cenomanian–Present

Family of millipedes

Synxenidae is a family of bristle millipedes (Polyxenida). Three genera and around 10 species are known. Adult synxenids possess 15 or 17 pairs of legs, with the last two pair modified for small jumps. Adults in most species in this family have 17 pairs of legs, but in two species (Condexenus biramipalpus and Phryssonotus brevicapensis), they have only 15 pairs of legs.
