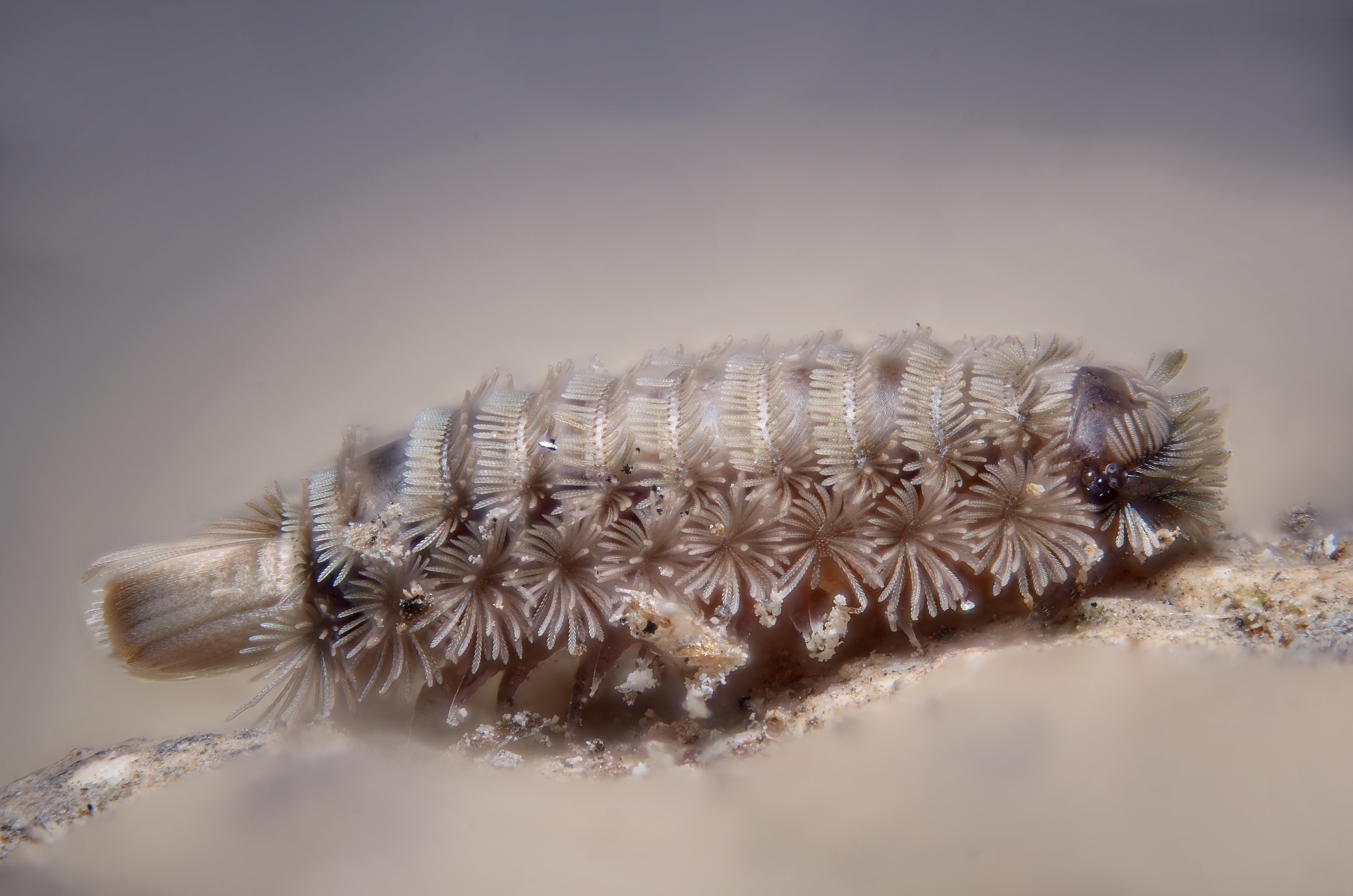
- Polyxenus lagurus

Scientific classification
- Kingdom: Animalia
- Phylum: Arthropoda
- Subphylum: Myriapoda
- Class: Diplopoda
- Order: Polyxenida
- Superfamily: Polyxenoidea
- Family: Polyxenidae; Lucas, 1840

Subtaxa
- See Taxonomy

= Polyxenidae =

Polyxenidae Temporal range: Barremian–Present

Family of millipedes

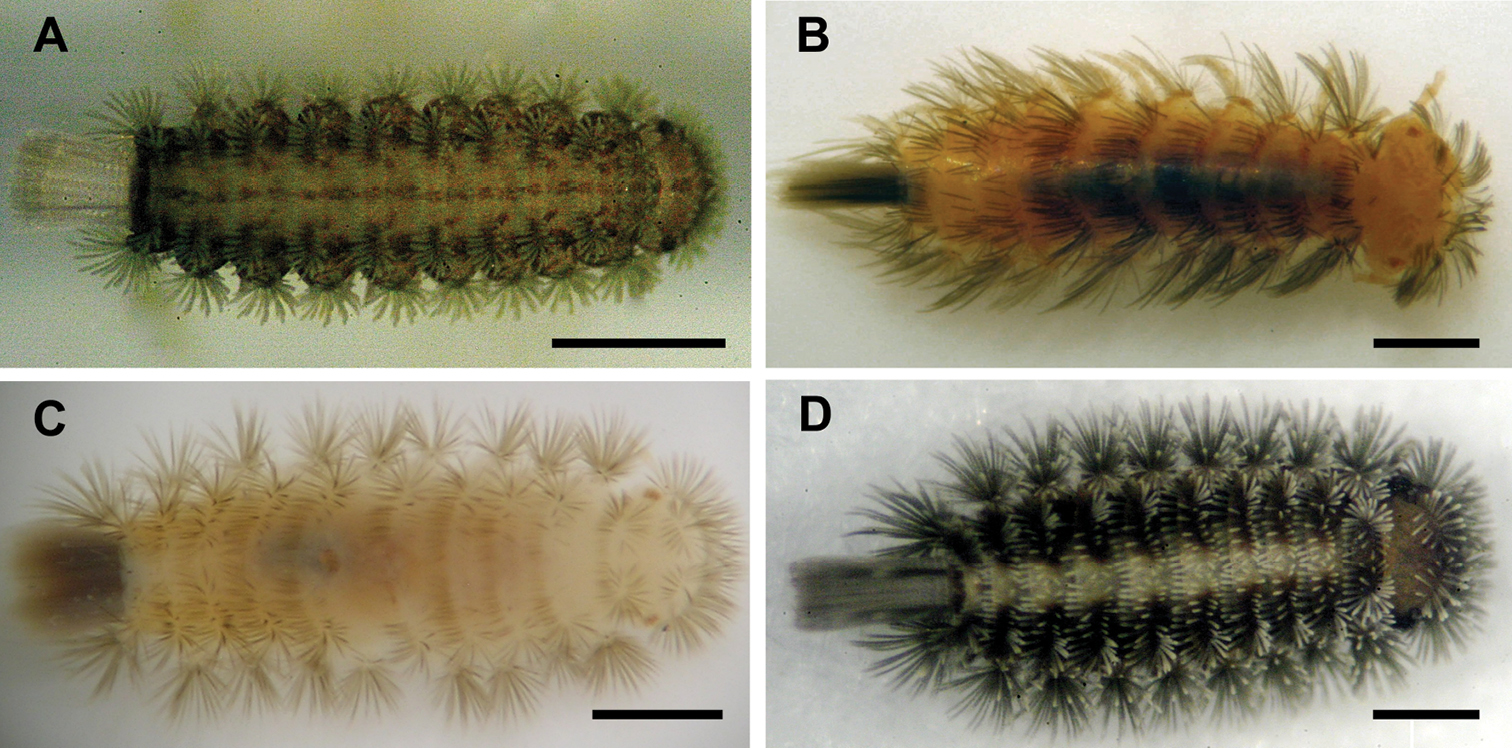
Four species of Unixenus from Australia. Scale bars = 0.5 mm.

Polyxenidae is a family of millipedes in the order Polyxenida. This family includes 109 species distributed among 23 genera. This family has a worldwide distribution, with species found on all continents except Antarctica.

== Description ==
Millipedes in this family range from 1.2 mm to 4.2 mm in length (not including the bundle of bristles at the tail end). All adults in this family feature 10 tergites in front of the telson and 13 pairs of legs. The male in this family features two to six pairs of pores on leg pairs 6 through 11. The male places his spermatophores on fine threads excreted from these pores.

== Taxonomy ==
The following subtaxa are recognised in the family Polyxenidae:

- Genus Ankistroxenus Attems, 1907
- Genus Apoxenus Chamberlin, 1947
- Genus †Electroxenus Jacquemin-Nguyen Duy & Azar, 2004 (Lebanese amber, Barremian)
- Genus †Libanoxenus Jacquemin-Nguyen Duy & Azar, 2004 (Lebanese amber, Barremian)
- Genus Mesoxenotus Silvestri, 1948
- Subfamily Hypogexeninae Schubart, 1947
  - Genus Hypogexenus Silvestri, 1903
- Subfamily Macroxeninae Condé, 2008
  - Genus Afraustraloxenodes Nguyen Duy-Jacquemin, 2003
  - Genus Chilexenus Silvestri, 1948
  - Genus Macroxenodes Silvestri, 1948
  - Genus Macroxenus Brölemann, 1917
- Subfamily Monographinae Condé, 2008
  - Genus Anopsxenus Condé & Jacquemin, 1963
  - Genus Eudigraphis Silvestri, 1948
  - Genus Mauritixenus Verhoeff, 1939
  - Genus Miopsxenus Condé, 1951
  - Genus Monographis Attems, 1907
  - Genus Pauropsxenus Silvestri, 1948 (With fossil species known from Burmese amber, Cenomanian)
  - Genus Saroxenus Cook, 1896
  - Genus Silvestrus Jones, 1937
  - Genus Unixenus Jones, 1944
- Subfamily Polyxeninae Lucas, 1840
  - Genus Polyxenus Latzel, 1884
  - Genus Propolyxenus Silvestri, 1948
  - Genus Typhloxenus Condé, 1955
