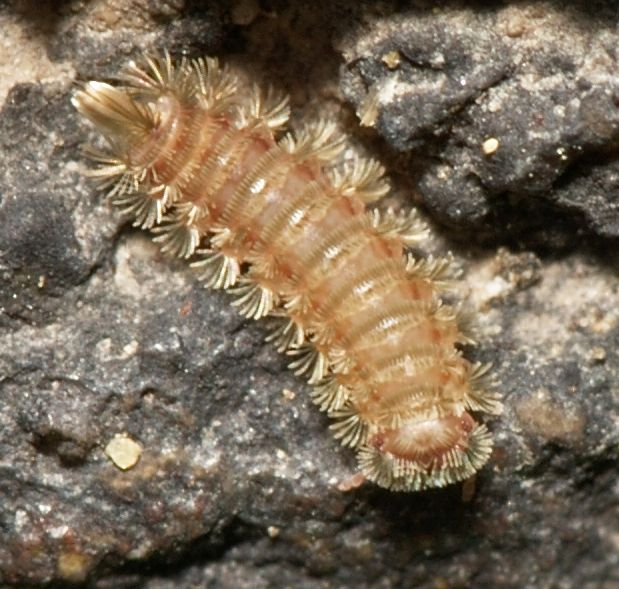
- Polyxenus lagurus

Scientific classification
- Kingdom: Animalia
- Phylum: Arthropoda
- Subphylum: Myriapoda
- Class: Diplopoda
- Subclass: Penicillata; Latrielle, 1831
- Order: Polyxenida; Verhoeff, 1934

Families
- Lophoproctidae; Polyxenidae; Synxenidae

Synonyms
- Subclass synonymy: Pselaphognatha Latzel, 1884; Schizocephala Verhoeff, 1926; Order synonymy: Ancyrotricha Cook, 1895

= Polyxenida =

Polyxenida Temporal range: Barremian–Present

Order of millipedes

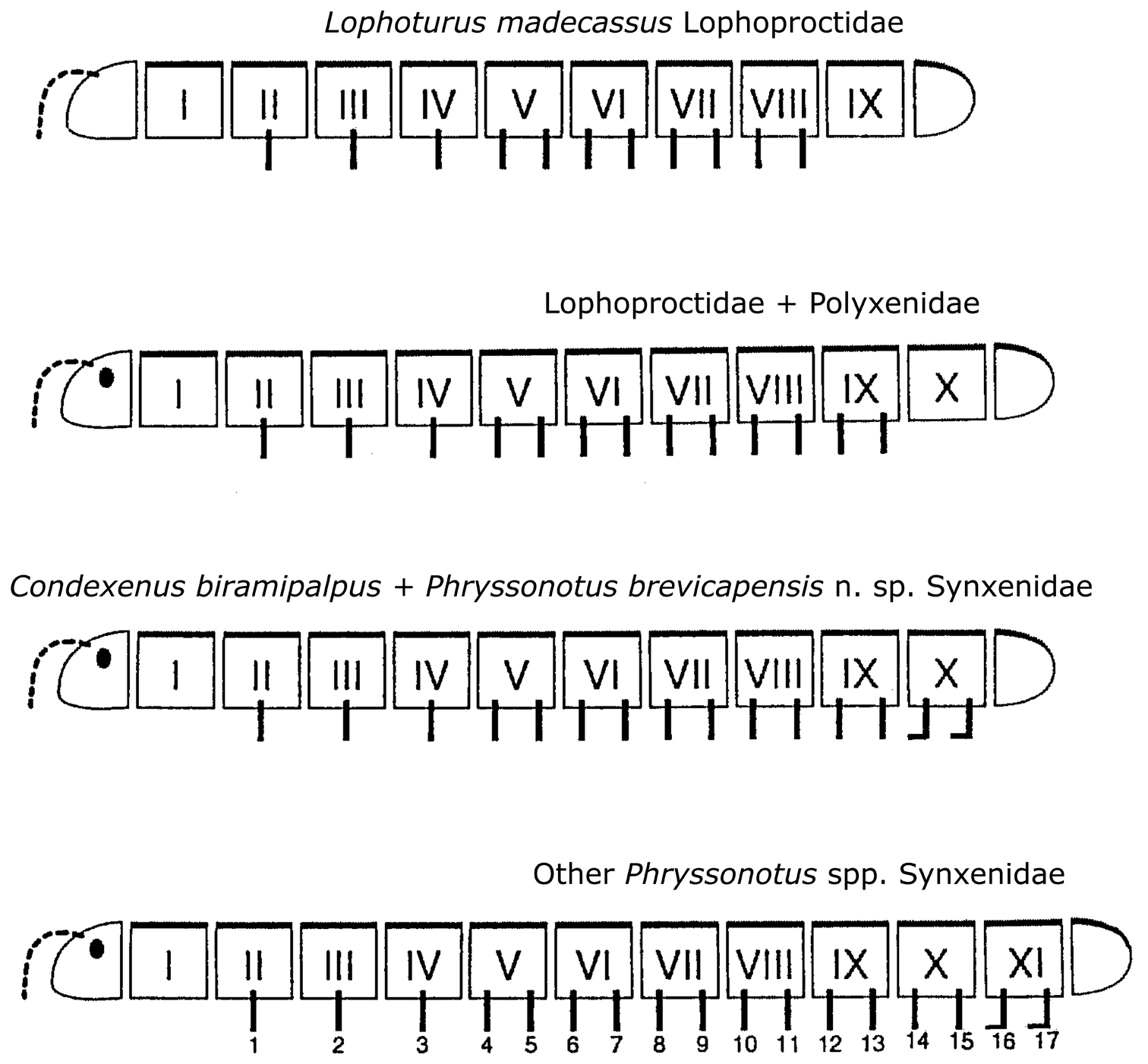
Segmentation of Polyxenida millipedes. From top to bottom: Lophoturus madecassus Other Lophoproctidae and Polyxenidae Condexenus biramipalpus and Phryssonotus brevicapensis Other Phryssonotus

Polyxenida is an order of millipedes readily distinguished by a unique body plan consisting of a soft, non-calcified body ornamented with tufts of bristles. These features have inspired the common names bristly millipedes or pincushion millipedes. This order includes about 148 species in four families worldwide, which represent the only living members of the subclass Penicillata.

== Description ==
Polyxenida differ from other millipedes in having a soft, non-calcified exoskeleton, unique tufts of bristles or setae, fewer legs (no more than 17 pairs), and an absence of copulatory appendages in males. Individuals are small, usually 1.5 to 4 millimeters (0.06 to 0.16 inches) long and not exceeding 7 millimeters (0.28 inches) long. Adults in most species have 13 pairs of legs, but in one species (Lophoturus madecassus), they have only 11 pairs of legs, and in one genus (Phryssonotus), they have 17 pairs of legs, except for one species (Phryssonotus brevicapensis) in which they (along with those in one other species, Condexenus biramipalpus) have 15 pairs of legs.

== Defense ==
Bristly millipedes lack the chemical defenses and hard exoskeleton of other millipedes. Instead, these millipedes employ a unique defense mechanism: Bristles at the rear end of these millipedes feature hooks and barbs. These distinctive barbed bristles can easily detach and become entangled in the limbs and mouth-parts of predatory insects, effectively immobilizing them.

== Reproduction ==
Male Polyxenidans lack the modified sperm-transferring appendages (gonopods) found in most other millipede groups. Instead, sperm transfer is indirect: Males deposit spermatophores into webs that they construct. Females then find these spermatophores by following threads spun by the males and pick up the spermatophores with their genitalia.

At least two species reproduce asexually by way of parthenogenesis, wherein females lay eggs without mating and males are absent or rare. For example, studies of the common species Polyxenus lagurus have found males scarce or absent in parts of northeastern Europe. Authorities suspect that in these populations, this species reproduces by thelytoky, that is, parthenogenesis in which unfertilized females produce female offspring.

== Development ==
Millipedes in this order grow and develop through a series of molts, adding segments and legs until they reach a fixed number in the adult stage, which is the same in a given species. Adults continue to molt, but they do not add segments or legs. This mode of development is known as hemianamorphosis.

The typical pattern in this order is observed in the common species Polyxenus lagurus. In this species, millipedes hatch with only 3 pairs of legs and 4 tergites, then develop through a series of seven molts and emerge as adults with 13 leg pairs and 10 tergites in the eighth stage. In this process, this millipede goes through stages with 3, 4, 5, 6, 8, 10, 12, and 13 leg pairs. Species in which adults have a different number of legs deviate from this common pattern.

== Classification ==
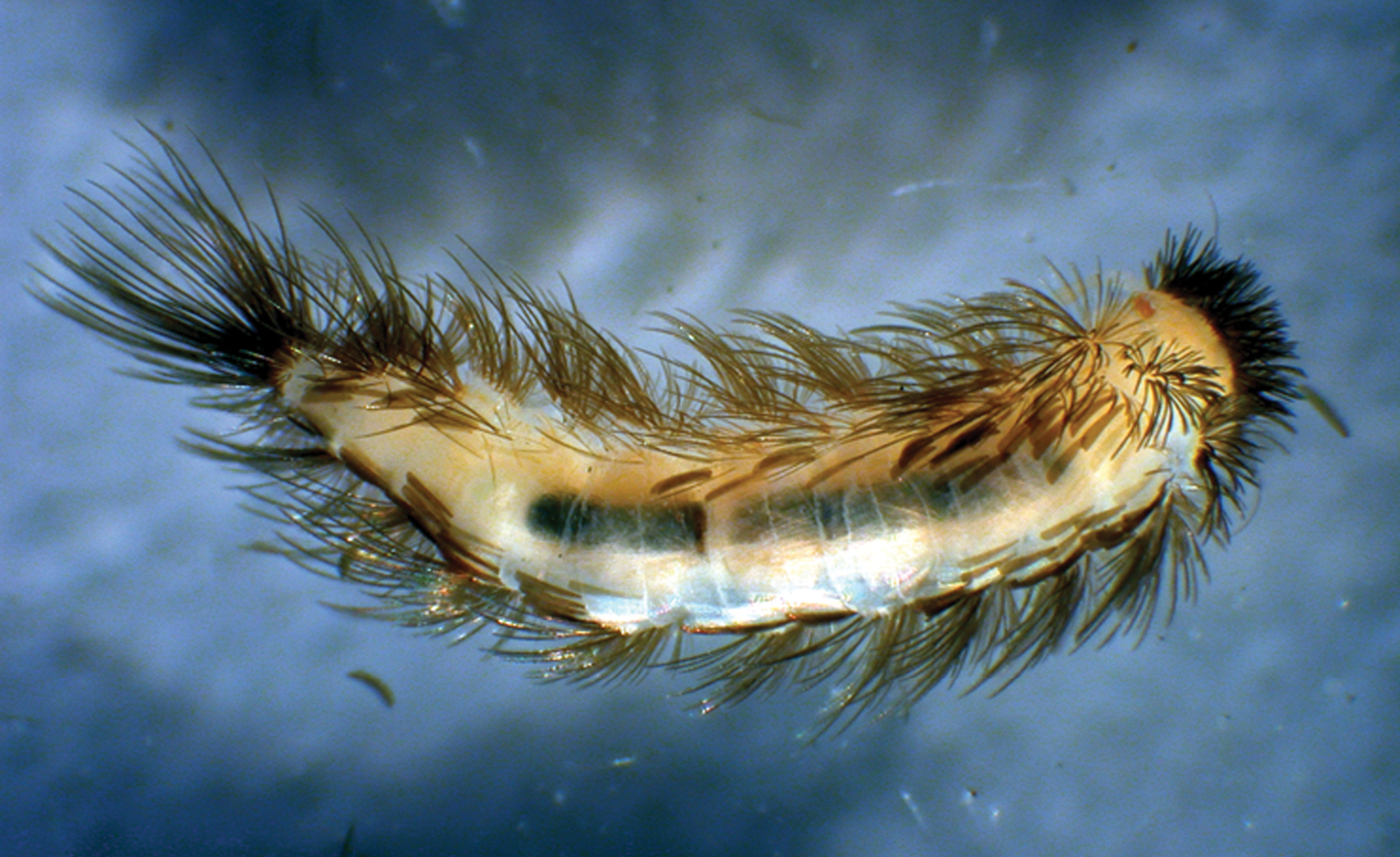
Phryssonotus brevicapensis (Synxenidae), a species from South Africa described in 2011

Polyxenida is the only living order of the subclass Penicillata, the basal subclass of millipedes. Penicillata is the sister group of all other living millipedes, which form the subclass Chilognatha. The subclass Chilognatha contains the infraclasses Pentazonia and Helminthomorpha.

The order Polyxenida includes 165 species distributed among 33 genera. At least eight new species have been described since 2010.

It contains the following subdivisions:

- Superfamily Polyxenoidea Lucas, 1840
  - Family Lophoproctidae Silvestri, 1897
  - Family Polyxenidae Lucas, 1840
    - Subfamily Hypogexeninae Schubart, 1947
    - Subfamily Macroxeninae Condé, 2008
    - Subfamily Monographinae Condé, 2008
    - Subfamily Polyxeninae Lucas, 1840
- Superfamily Synxenoidea Silvestri, 1923
  - Family Synxenidae Silvestri, 1923

A phylogenetic analysis by Short & Vahtera in 2017 recovered the following phylogenetic trees, with both trees finding the family Polyxenidae polyphyletic, only the first recovering a division of the order into the two superfamilies, and only the second finding Lophoproctidae monophyletic:

Optimal maximum likelihood tree on molecular data

- Polyxenida
  - Synxenidae
  - - Polyxeninae (Polyxenidae)
    - - Macroxeninae (Polyxenidae)
      - - Lophoproctus
        - - Alloproctoides + Lophoturus
          - Monographinae (Polyxenidae)

Strict consensus of most parsimonious trees on combined morphological and molecular data

- Polyxenida
  - remaining Propolyxenus species
  - - Polyxenus + Propolyxenus trivittatus
    - - Macroxeninae (Polyxenidae)
      - - Lophoproctidae
        - - Eudigraphis
          - - Monographis + Unixenus
            - Synxenidae

From this analysis the authors concluded that the currently held taxonomic arrangement, of a family Polyxenidae with 4 subfamilies, may need to be further revised with elevation to family status of the subfamilies Monographinae and Polyxeninae. Additional material from a wider range of species is needed for a more definite picture of the internal interrelations of the group.

== Fossil history ==
The earliest representatives of Polyxenida are found in Lebanese amber from the Early Cretaceous period. The fossil records also include representatives found in Burmese amber, Baltic amber, and the Cretaceous amber of Haute-Provence in France. These fossils indicate that the families Polyxenidae and Synxenidae already existed in the Cretaceous period.

Some authors place the extinct orders Arthropleurida and Eoarthropleurida (each represented by a single genus) within the Penicillata as a sister group to Polyxenida. Others consider these extinct orders to be a sister group to Penicillata. Still others deem these extinct orders to be a sister group to the subclass Chilognatha instead.
