= Siphoniulus =

Siphoniulus Temporal range: Cenomanian–Present
- Two views of Siphoniulus alba head

Scientific classification
- Kingdom: Animalia
- Phylum: Arthropoda
- Subphylum: Myriapoda
- Class: Diplopoda
- Subclass: Chilognatha
- Infraclass: Helminthomorpha
- Subterclass: Eugnatha
- Order: Siphoniulida; Cook, 1895
- Family: Siphoniulidae; Pocock, 1894
- Genus: Siphoniulus; Pocock, 1894

Species
- Siphoniulus alba Pocock, 1894; Siphoniulus neotropicus Hoffman, 1979; Siphoniulus porosus †Siphoniulus muelleri †Siphoniulus preciosus

Genus of millipedes

Siphoniulus is a poorly known genus of millipede containing only two living species: S. alba from Indonesia, and S. neotropicus from Mexico and Guatemala. An additional two fossil species are known from Cretaceous amber. Siphoniulus species are the only members of the family Siphoniulidae and order Siphoniulida, making Siphoniulida the smallest millipede order. Few specimens are known, and their classification is contentious, although most recent studies place them as basal members of the Helminthomorpha ("worm-like millipedes").

== Description ==
Siphoniulids are small and eyeless. The head is drawn out into a conical beak, and lacks Tömösváry organs. The body is relatively long and narrow, containing up to 51 segments and reaching up to 7.5 mm (0.30 in) long, (Note: The holotype and only known specimen of S. alba was described as 11 mm, but the anterior part of it is now missing.) and 0.25 mm (0.01 in) wide. The body color ranges from pure white to tan, and has been described as resembling a nematode. The exoskeleton is smooth and has few setae, and ozopores (defensive glands) are lacking. The third segment is legless. Males possess a single pair of gonopods (modified copulatory legs) consisting of the anterior limbs on the seventh segment, and which are partially recessed into the body. The telson (rear-most segment) possesses small bristle-like structures called spinnerets.

== Distribution ==
Siphoniulus alba is only known from a single specimen collected in 1894 near Maninjau on the Indonesian island of Sumatra. S. neotropicus was discovered near the Mayan ruins of Tikal in Guatemala, and is also known from the Mexican states of Chiapas and Veracruz. The extinct species S. muelleri and S. preciosus are known from Late Cretaceous Burmese amber.

== History ==
Siphoniulus alba (and the family Siphoniulidae) was described in 1894 by R. I. Pocock, from a female specimen collected near Maninjau on the island of Sumatra. The specimen was deposited in the Zoological Museum Amsterdam, but by 1975 the specimen was missing its head and anterior segments. S. neotropicus was described by Richard L. Hoffman in 1979 from two possibly immature females collected in Guatemala. Males of either species were unknown until 2003, when samples of leaf litter from Mexico sorted by researchers at the Field Museum of Natural History revealed new specimens of S. neotropicus, allowing for complete anatomical descriptions and characterization of the gonopods.

== Species ==
This genus currently contains three extant species and two extinct species.

- Siphoniulus alba Pocock, 1894
- Siphoniulus neotropicus Hoffman, 1979
- Siphoniulus porosus
- †Siphoniulus muelleri
- †Siphoniulus preciosus

== Classification ==
Simplified cladogram from Sierwald et al 2003

- Polyxenida
- Chilognatha
  - Pentazonia
  - Helminthomorpha
    - Siphoniulida
    - Chordeumatida
    - - - Colobognatha
          - Platydesmida
          - - Siphonophorida
            - Polyzoniida
        - Juliformia
          - - Julida
            - Spirobolida
          - Spirostreptida
      - Stemmiulida
      - Callipodida
      - Polydesmida

The incorporation of Siphoniulida anatomy did not clearly resolve relationships of millipede orders.

Simplified cladogram from Sierwald & Bond 2007

- Polyxenida
- Chilognatha
  - Pentazonia
  - Helminthomorpha
    - Siphoniulida
    - - Stemmiulida
      - - - Polydesmida
          - - Polyzoniida
            - - Siphonophorida
              - - Siphonocryptida
                - Platydesmida
        - - - Chordeumatida
            - Callipodida
          - Juliformia
            - Spirobolida
            - - Spirostreptida
              - Julida

Combining morphological with molecular data improved resolution, and also supported a basal helminthomorph placement of Siphoniulida.

Siphoniulids have been classified in various, conflicting placements within the Helminthomorpha ("worm-like" millipedes) since their initial description, and their relation to the rest of millipedes is still unresolved. When first described, the family Siphoniulidae was placed in the "Suborder" Colobognatha, a group that is now recognized as a larger grouping including the orders Platydesmida, Polyzoniida, and Siphonophorida. The following year, the American entomologist Orator F. Cook considered Stemiulids as "suborder Siphoniuloidea", closely related to Julidans and Spirostreptidans (a grouping termed Diplochaeata). In 1979, Hoffman placed Siphoniulida (now considered an order) as Helminthomorph incertae sedis, meaning the placement within Helminthomorphs was undetermined, due to the absence of male specimens. (Note: Gonopod morphology is one of the primary diagnostic traits in millipedes.) With only two known species, Siphoniulida is the smallest order of millipedes, followed by Siphonocryptida with three to six species.

In more recent years, millipedes have been studied by cladistic and modern phylogenetic methods, yet Siphoniulida remains enigmatic. In the first cladistic study of millipedes, Enghoff could only place Siphoniulids as incertae sedis within the Helminthomorpha, but "probably... a specialized subordinate taxon within some juliform or colobognathan order". However, in the first morphological study of millipede phylogeny incorporating full details of Siphoniulus anatomy, Siphoniulida did not appear closely related to the Juliformia nor Colobognatha, but rather appeared as an outgroup to all other helminthomorphs, and the internal classification of Helminthomorpha was poorly resolved and significantly differed from Enghoff's. In a subsequent study combining anatomical data with DNA sequence data from other groups, Siphoniulida again appeared as basal within Helminthomorpha.
