= Gonopod =

Specialized reproductive appendages in arthropods

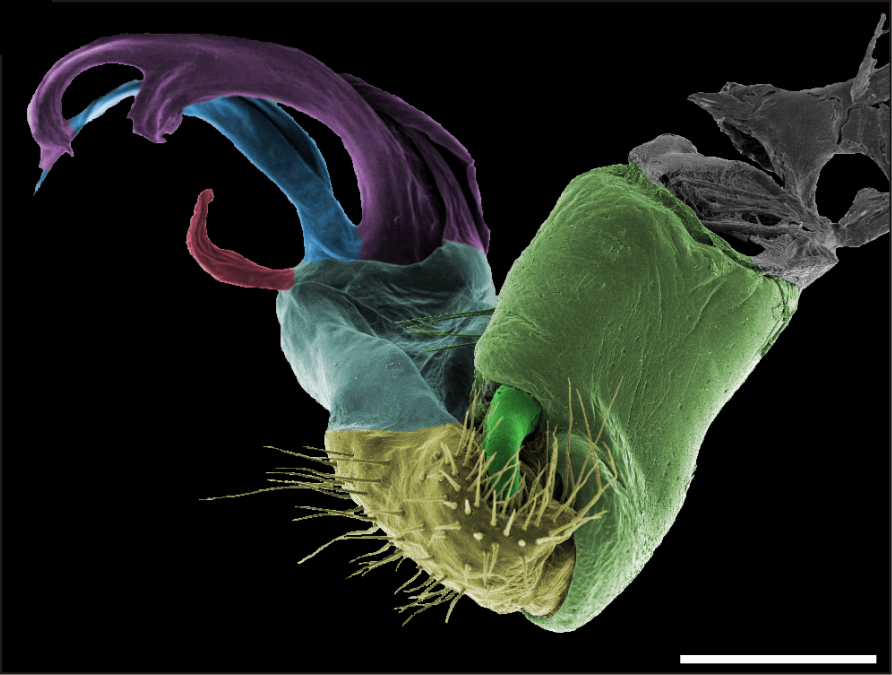
One of two gonopods of the greenhouse millipede (Oxidus gracilis). Scale bar: 0.2 mm or approximately 1/127 in

Gonopods are specialized appendages of various arthropods used in reproduction or egg-laying. In males, they facilitate the transfer of sperm from male to female during mating, and thus are a type of intromittent organ. In crustaceans and millipedes, gonopods are modified walking or swimming legs. Gonopods may be highly decorated with elaborate structures which may play roles in sperm competition, and can be used to differentiate and identify closely related species. Gonopods generally occur in one or more pairs, as opposed to the single (un-paired) reproductive organs such as the aedeagus of insects or the penis of harvestmen.

== Insects ==
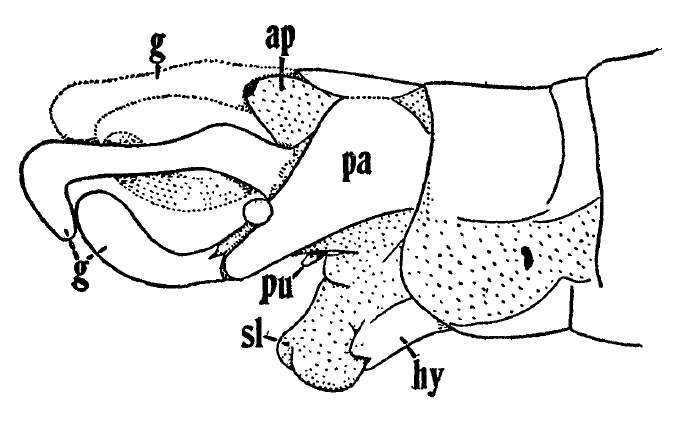
Paired gonopods (g) on the male genitalia of Corydalus cornutus

In insects, gonopods are appendages of the genital segment that may be used in insemination, or that comprise the egg-laying apparatus.

== Crustaceans ==
In male decapod crustaceans, gonopods are modified swimming appendages (pleopods). The anterior two pair of pleopods in males are modified for sperm transferring, with differing degree of morphological diversification.

== Millipedes ==
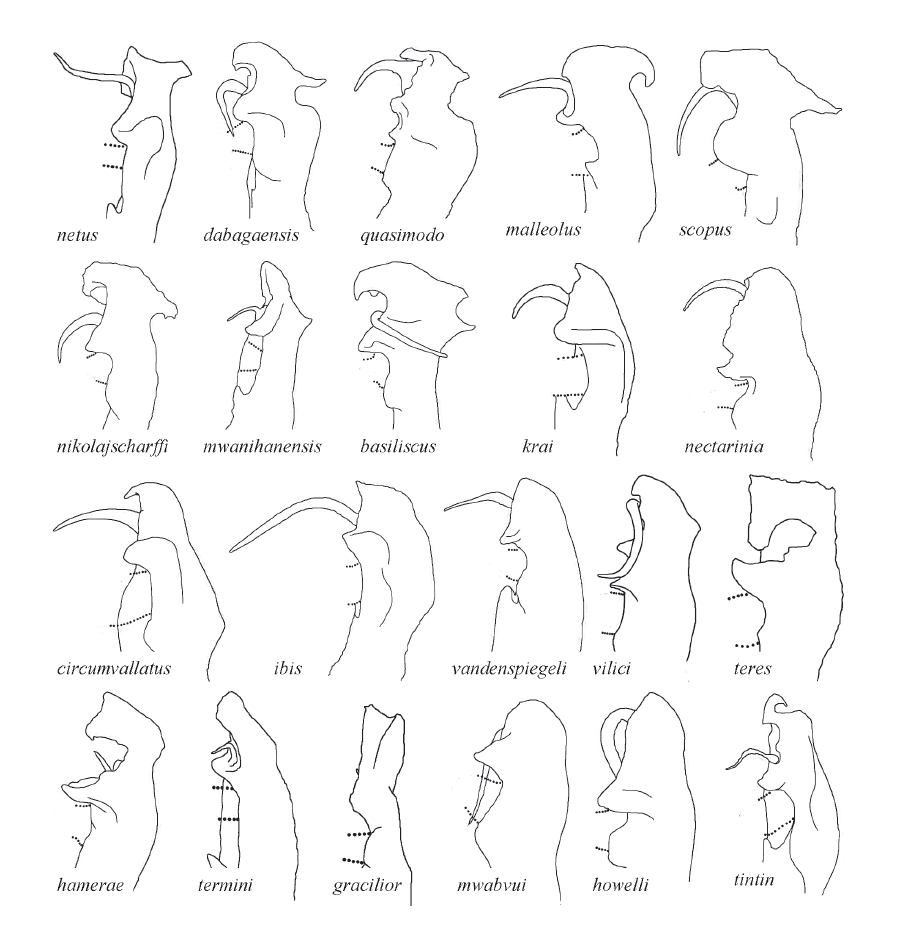
Gonopod diversity in 20 Chaleponcus species (Spirostreptida, Odontopygidae) from Tanzania

In millipedes, gonopods consist of one or two pairs of often highly modified walking legs in mature males, and are primarily found in members of the subgroup Helminthomorpha—containing most orders and the vast majority of species—where they are located on the seventh body segment consisting of leg pairs 8 and/or 9. Males of the subgroup Pentazonia (which includes the Oniscomorpha (pill millipedes) and Glomeridesmida) lack gonopods but possess enlarged appendages known as telopods at the rear of the body used to firmly hold females during mating. The complex structure of gonopods is a primary method of distinguishing closely related species of millipede, although the terminology used to describe the same structures may vary between authors. The complex morphology of millipede gonopods may be driven by sperm competition or other forms of sexual selection, with some structures serving to scoop out or displace sperm of other males, and others acting to stimulate females into becoming sexually receptive.

Millipede gonopods do not produce sperm directly, but rather gather sperm produced from a gonopore on the base of the third body segment.

Gonopods develop gradually during the growth of an individual. In early developmental stages, all legs are of the walking type, and cannot be used to determine sex. Through successive molts, the walking legs metamorphose into mature gonopods.

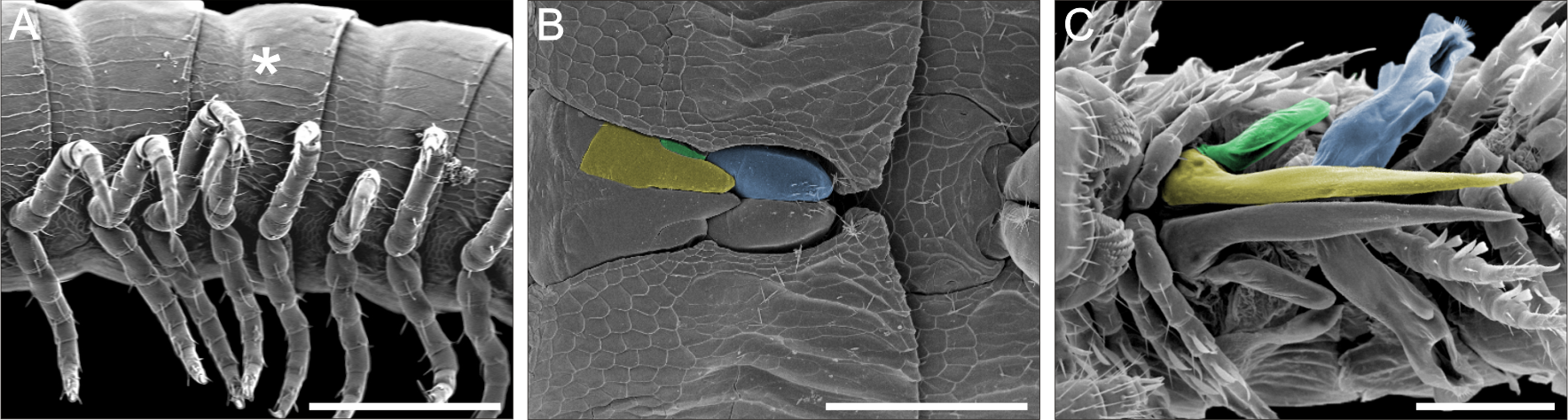
Gonopod development in Nopoiulus kochii (Julida, Blaniulidae). A: juvenile with walking legs on segment 7 (asterisk). B: subsequent stage with walking legs replaced by gonopod primordia. C: adult stage with gonopods (colored) in place of walking legs.

Order	Number of pairs of gonopods/telopods	Leg pair(s) modified! (Note: counting from head)	Notes LP = Leg pair	Image (Note: not necessarily representative of order)
Callipodida	1	8th	LP9 is reduced	Sinocallipus steineri
Chordeumatida	2	8th & 9th	Gonopods and other accessory mating legs vary within the four suborders: In Chordeumatidea LP9 sperm-transferring, LP10 is reduced, and LP11 possess coxal glands; in Heterochordeumatidea LP9 sperm-transferring, LP10 reduced, and both LP10 and LP11 with coxal gland; in the Craspedosomatidea and Striariidea, LP8 sperm-transferring, LP9 modified, LP10 and LP11 with coxal glands	
Glomerida	2 (telopods)		Not involved with sperm transfer, only clasping females	Glomeris troglokabyliana walking legs (A, B) and telopod (C)
Glomeridesmida	1 (telopods)			
Julida	2	8th & 9th	LP9 sperm-transferring	Ommatoiulus chambiensis right anterior (1) and posterior (2)
Platydesmida	2	9th & 10th	Leg-like; LP 9 sperm-transferring	
Polydesmida	1	8th		Desmoxytes lingulata
Polyxenida	0		Indirect fertilization	
Polyzoniida	2	9th & 10th	leg-like; LP 9 sperm-transferring	
Siphoniulida	1	8th		
Siphonocryptida	2	9th & 10th	leg-like, LP 9 sperm-transferring	
Siphonophorida	2	9th & 10th	leg-like; LP 9 sperm-transferring	Illacme plenipes, arrow pointing to anterior gonopods
Sphaerotheriida	2 (telopods)			Sphaeromimus vatovavy posterior telopods
Spirobolida	2	8th & 9th	LP9 sperm-transferring, LP8 fused into single structure.	Aphistogoniulus jeekeli anterior (A) and left posterior (B)
Spirostreptida	2	8th & 9th	LP8 sperm-transferring	
Stemmiulida	1	8th	LP8 sperm-transferring; LP9 reduced	

== See also ==
- Gonopodium, a modified fin for sperm transfer found in some fish
- Claspers, pelvic fins modified for copulation in cartilaginous fish
- Pedipalps, appendages of arachnids involved in sperm-transfer
