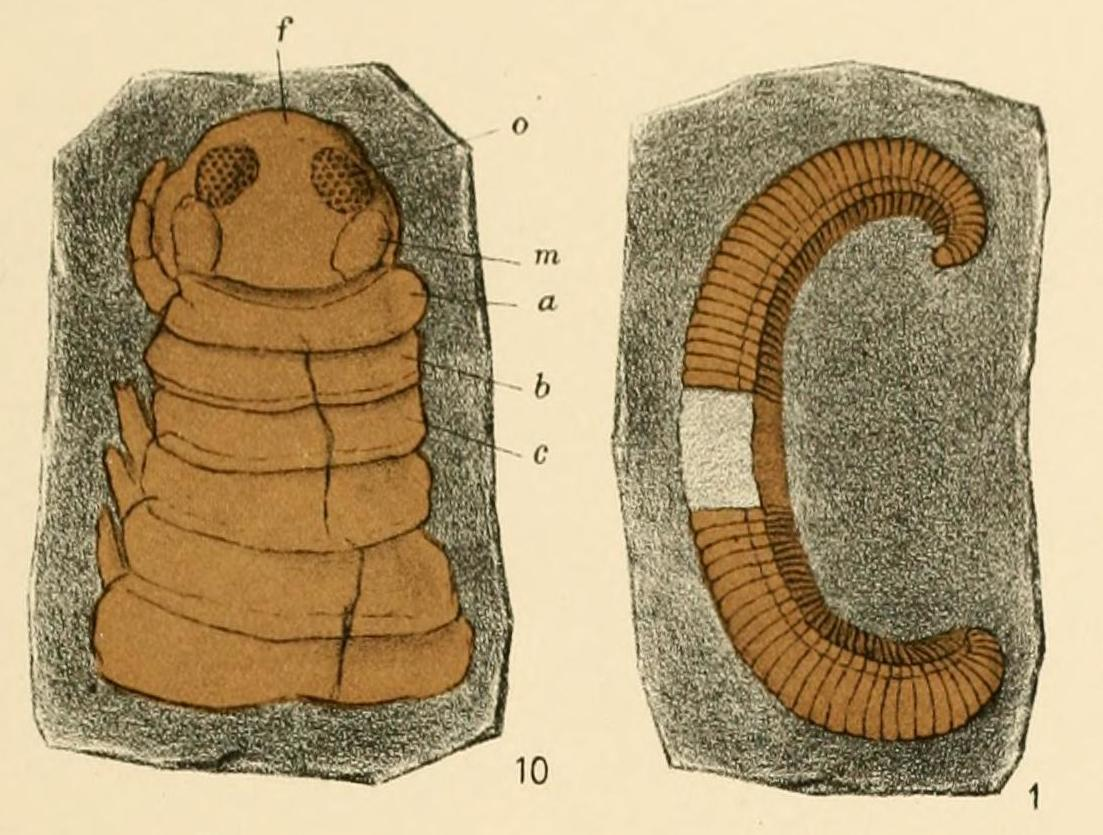
- Pleurojulus biornatus fossils

Scientific classification
- Domain: Eukaryota
- Kingdom: Animalia
- Phylum: Arthropoda
- Subphylum: Myriapoda
- Class: Diplopoda
- Subclass: Chilognatha
- Infraclass: Helminthomorpha
- Order: †Pleurojulida; Wilson & Hannibal, 2005
- Family: †Pleurojulidae; Schneider & Werneburg, 1998

Genera
- Isojulus; Pleurojulus

= Pleurojulidae =

Pleurojulidae Temporal range: Westphalian

Extinct family of millipedes

Pleurojulidae is an extinct family of millipedes known from the Westphalian stage of the upper Carboniferous that are distinct enough to be placed in their own order, Pleurojulida. Fossil pleurojulids up to 10 centimeters long are known from Europe and the United States.
