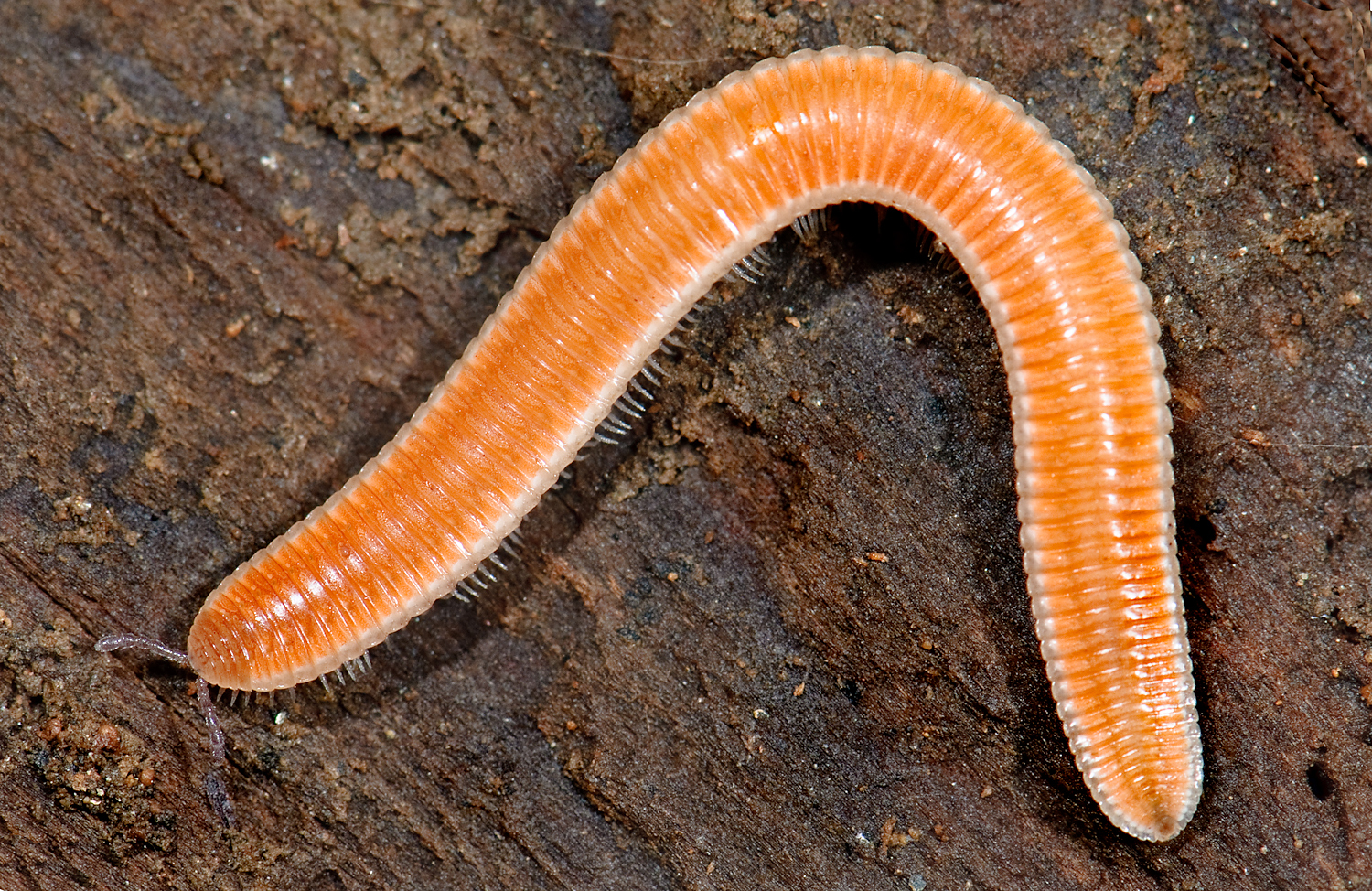
- Octoglena sierra (Polyzoniida)

Scientific classification
- Domain: Eukaryota
- Kingdom: Animalia
- Phylum: Arthropoda
- Subphylum: Myriapoda
- Class: Diplopoda
- Subclass: Chilognatha
- Infraclass: Helminthomorpha
- Clade: Colobognatha; Brandt, 1834

Orders
- Platydesmida; Polyzoniida; Siphonocryptida; Siphonophorida

= Colobognatha =

Clade of millipedes

Colobognatha is a clade (formally considered a subterclass) of helminthomorph millipedes containing four orders: Platydesmida, Polyzoniida, Siphonocryptida, and Siphonophorida.

== Description ==
The Colobognatha are united by several shared traits (synapomorphies). Males have two pairs of simple, leg-like gonopods, consisting of the rear leg pair of body segment 7 and the foreword-most leg pair of segment 8. They possess tubular defensive glands that open on the sides of the body, and lack a palp-like structure on their gnathochilaria. Other traits found in colobognathans, but not exclusively, include a distinctly narrow head, lack of Tömösváry organs, and no more than two pairs of ocelli.
