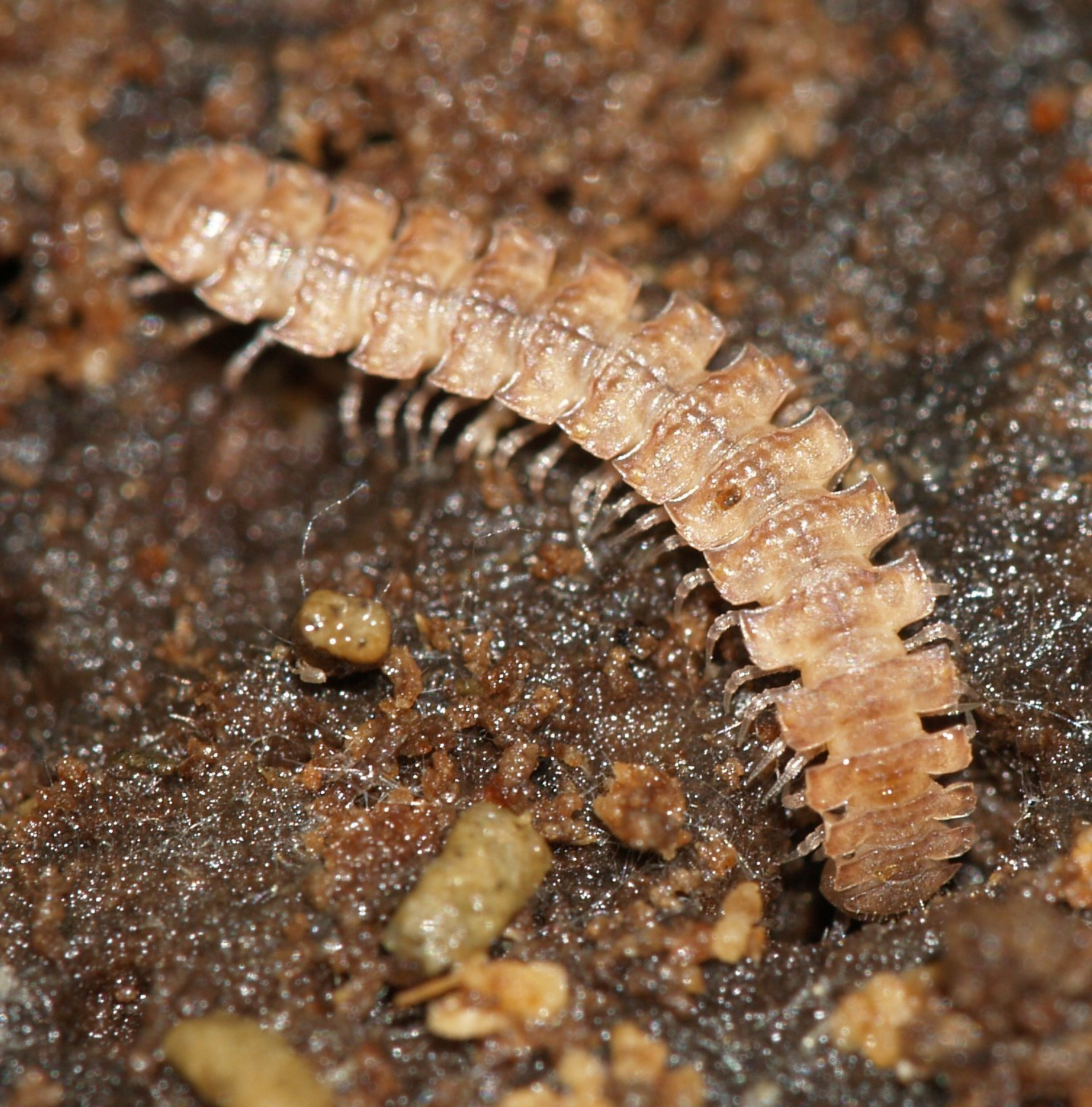
- Polydesmus angustus

Scientific classification
- Kingdom: Animalia
- Phylum: Arthropoda
- Subphylum: Myriapoda
- Class: Diplopoda
- Subclass: Chilognatha; Latrielle, 1802

= Chilognatha =

Chilognatha Temporal range: Wenlock–Present

Subclass of millipedes

Chilognatha is a subclass of the class Diplopoda, which includes the vast majority of extant millipedes, about 12,000 species.

== Taxonomy ==
The classification of Chilognatha presented below is based on Shear, 2011, and Shear & Edgecombe, 2010 (extinct groups). Recent cladistic and molecular studies have challenged the traditional classification schemes above, and in particular the position of the orders Siphoniulida and Polyzoniida is not yet well established. The placement and positions of extinct groups (†) known only from fossils is tentative and not fully resolved. After each name is listed the author citation: the name of the person who coined the name or defined the group, even if not at the current rank.

- Subclass Chilognatha Latrielle, 1802
  - Order †Zosterogrammida Wilson, 2005 (Chilognatha incertae sedis)
  - Order †Microdecemplicida? Wilson & Shear, 2000 (Originally considered as member of Arthropleuridea)
  - Infraclass Pentazonia Brandt, 1833
    - Order †Amynilyspedida Hoffman, 1969
    - Superorder Limacomorpha Pocock, 1894
      - Order Glomeridesmida Cook, 1895
    - Superorder Oniscomorpha Pocock, 1887
      - Order Glomerida Brandt, 1833
      - Order Sphaerotheriida Brandt, 1833
  - Infraclass Helminthomorpha Pocock, 1887
    - Superorder †Archipolypoda Scudder, 1882
      - Order †Archidesmida Wilson & Anderson 2004
      - Order †Cowiedesmida Wilson & Anderson 2004
      - Order †Euphoberiida Hoffman, 1969
      - Order †Palaeosomatida Hannibal & Krzeminski, 2005
    - Order †Pleurojulida Schneider & Werneburg, 1998 (possibly sister to Colobognatha)
    - Subterclass Colobognatha Brandt, 1834
      - Order Platydesmida Cook, 1895
      - Order Polyzoniida Cook, 1895
      - Order Siphonocryptida Cook, 1895
      - Order Siphonophorida Newport, 1844
    - Subterclass Eugnatha Attems, 1898
      - Superorder Juliformia Attems, 1926
        - Order Julida Brandt, 1833
        - Order Spirobolida Cook, 1895
        - Order Spirostreptida Brandt, 1833
        - Superfamily †Xyloiuloidea Cook, 1895 (Sometimes aligned with Spirobolida)
      - Superorder Nematophora Verhoeff, 1913
        - Order Callipodida Pocock, 1894
        - Order Chordeumatida Pocock 1894
        - Order Stemmiulida Cook, 1895
        - Order Siphoniulida Cook, 1895
      - Superorder Merocheta Cook, 1895
        - Order Polydesmida Pocock, 1887
