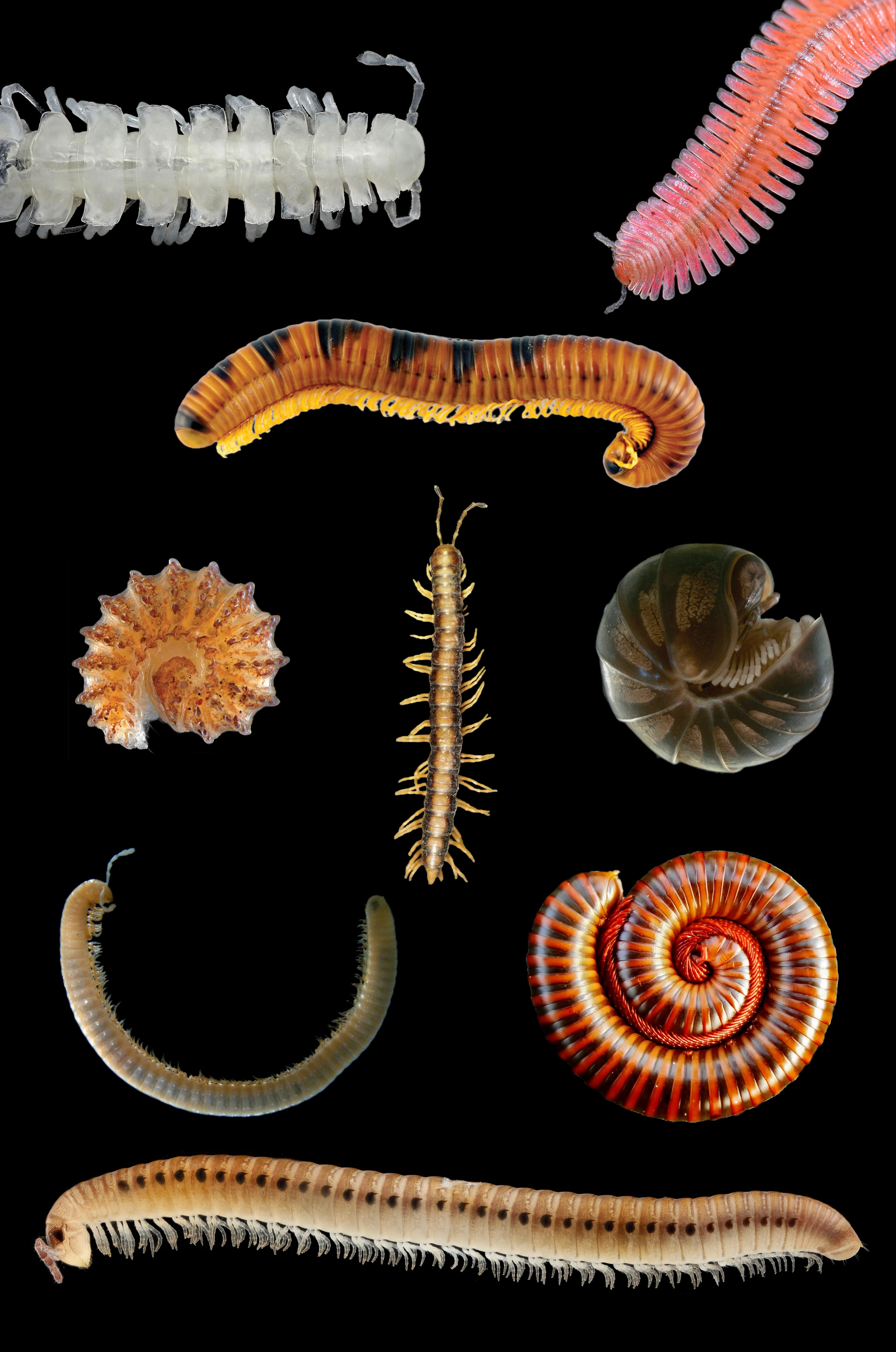
- An assortment of millipedes (not to scale)

Scientific classification
- Kingdom: Animalia
- Phylum: Arthropoda
- Subphylum: Myriapoda
- Class: Diplopoda; Blainville in Gervais, 1844

Subclasses
- Chilognatha; Penicillata; †Arthropleuridea

Diversity
- 16 orders, c. 12,000 species

= Millipede =

Millipedes Temporal range: 427–0 Ma Late Silurian to Present

Class of arthropods

Millipedes (originating from the Latin mille, "thousand", and pes, "foot") are a group of arthropods that are characterised by having two pairs of jointed legs on most body segments; they are known scientifically as the class Diplopoda, the name derived from this feature. Each double-legged segment is a result of two single segments fused together. Most millipedes have very elongated cylindrical or flattened bodies with more than 20 segments, while pill millipedes are shorter and can roll into a tight ball. Although the name "millipede" derives from Latin for "thousand feet", no species was known to have 1,000 or more until the discovery in 2020 of Eumillipes persephone, which can have over 1,300 legs. There are approximately 12,000 named species classified into 16 orders and around 140 families, making Diplopoda the largest class of myriapods, an arthropod subphylum which also includes centipedes and other multi-legged creatures.

Most millipedes are slow-moving detritivores, eating decaying leaves (e.g. forest litter) and other dead plant matter (e.g. coarse woody debris); however, some eat fungi or suck plant fluids. Millipedes are generally harmless to humans, although some can become household or garden pests. Millipedes can be an unwanted nuisance particularly in greenhouses where they can potentially cause severe damage to emergent seedlings. Most millipedes defend themselves with a variety of chemicals secreted from pores along the body, although the tiny bristle millipedes are covered with tufts of detachable bristles. Its primary defence mechanism is to curl into a tight coil (volvation), thereby protecting its legs and other vital delicate areas on the body behind a hard exoskeleton. Reproduction in most species is carried out by modified male legs called gonopods, which transfer packets of sperm to females.

First appearing in the Silurian period, millipedes are some of the oldest known land animals. Some members of prehistoric groups, such as Arthropleura, grew to over 2 m (6 1/2 ft); the largest modern species reach maximum lengths of 27 to 38 cm (10 1/2 to 15 in). The longest extant species is the giant African millipede Archispirostreptus gigas.

Among myriapods, millipedes have traditionally been considered most closely related to the tiny pauropods, although some molecular studies challenge this relationship. Millipedes can be distinguished from the somewhat similar but only distantly related centipedes (class Chilopoda), which move rapidly, are venomous, carnivorous, and have only a single pair of legs on each body segment.

The scientific study of millipedes is known as diplopodology, and a scientist who studies them is called a diplopodologist.

== Etymology and names ==
The term "millipede" is widespread in popular and scientific literature, but among North American scientists, the term "milliped" (without the terminal e) is also used. Other vernacular names include "thousand-legger" or simply "diplopod". The study of millipede biology and taxonomy is called diplopodology.

== Classification ==
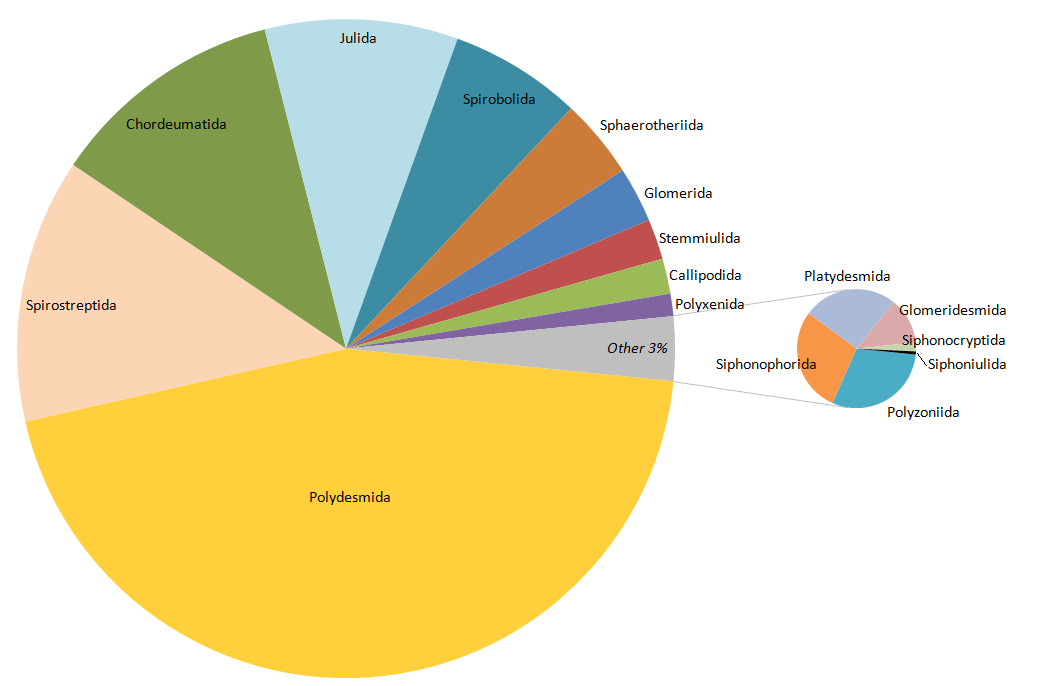
Approximate relative diversity of extant millipede orders, ranging from ca. 3,500 species of Polydesmida to 2 species of Siphoniulida

Approximately 12,000 millipede species have been described. Estimates of the true number of species on earth range from 15,000 to as high as 80,000. Few species of millipede are at all widespread; they have very poor dispersal abilities, depending as they do on terrestrial locomotion and humid habitats. These factors have favoured genetic isolation (strong phylogeographic structure) and rapid speciation, producing many lineages with restricted ranges.

The living members of the Diplopoda are divided into sixteen orders in two subclasses. The basal subclass Penicillata contains a single order, Polyxenida (bristle millipedes). All other millipedes belong to the subclass Chilognatha consisting of two infraclasses: Pentazonia, containing the short-bodied pill millipedes, and Helminthomorpha (worm-like millipedes), containing the great majority of the species. A recent phylogenomic analysis using 311 orthologous genes placed 15 orders in a phylogenetic context.

=== Outline of classification ===
The higher-level classification of millipedes is presented below, based on Shear (2011), and Shear & Edgecombe (2010) for extinct groups. Recent cladistic and molecular studies have challenged the traditional classification schemes above, and in particular the position of the orders Siphoniulida and Polyzoniida is not yet well established. The placement and positions of extinct groups (†) known only from fossils is tentative and not fully resolved. After each name is listed the author citation: the name of the person who coined the name or defined the group, even if not at the current rank.

Class Diplopoda de Blainville in Gervais, 1844

- Subclass Penicillata Latreille, 1831
  - Order Polyxenida Verhoeff, 1934
- Subclass †Arthropleuridea (placed in Penicillata by some authors)
  - Order †Arthropleurida Waterlot, 1934
  - Order †Eoarthropleurida Shear & Selden, 1995
  - Order †Microdecemplicida Wilson & Shear, 2000
- Subclass Chilognatha Latreille, 1802
  - Order †Zosterogrammida Wilson, 2005 (Chilognatha incertae sedis)
  - Infraclass Pentazonia Brandt, 1833
    - Order †Amynilyspedida Hoffman, 1969
    - Superorder Limacomorpha Pocock, 1894
      - Order Glomeridesmida Cook, 1895
    - Superorder Oniscomorpha Pocock, 1887
      - Order Glomerida Brandt, 1833
      - Order Sphaerotheriida Brandt, 1833
  - Infraclass Helminthomorpha Pocock, 1887
    - Superorder †Archipolypoda Scudder, 1882
      - Order †Archidesmida Wilson & Anderson 2004
      - Order †Cowiedesmida Wilson & Anderson 2004
      - Order †Euphoberiida Hoffman, 1969
      - Order †Palaeosomatida Hannibal & Krzeminski, 2005
    - Order †Pleurojulida Schneider & Werneburg, 1998 (possibly sister to Colobognatha)
    - Subterclass Colobognatha Brandt, 1834
      - Order Platydesmida Cook, 1895
      - Order Polyzoniida Cook, 1895
      - Order Siphonocryptida Cook, 1895
      - Order Siphonophorida Newport, 1844
    - Subterclass Eugnatha Attems, 1898
      - Superorder Juliformia Attems, 1926
        - Order Julida Brandt, 1833
        - Order Spirobolida Cook, 1895
        - Order Spirostreptida Brandt, 1833
        - Superfamily †Xyloiuloidea Cook, 1895 (Sometimes aligned with Spirobolida)
      - Superorder Nematophora Verhoeff, 1913
        - Order Callipodida Pocock, 1894
        - Order Chordeumatida Pocock 1894
        - Order Stemmiulida Cook, 1895
        - Order Siphoniulida Cook, 1895
      - Superorder Merocheta Cook, 1895
        - Order Polydesmida Pocock, 1887

=== Evolution ===
Millipedes are among the first animals to have colonised land during the Silurian period. Early forms most likely ate mosses and primitive vascular plants. There are two major groups of millipedes whose members are all extinct: the Archipolypoda ("ancient, many-legged ones") which contain the oldest known terrestrial animals, and Arthropleuridea, which contain the largest known land invertebrates. The earliest known body fossil of millipedes is from the Wenlock Epoch, dated to approximately 427.0 ± 4.5 million years ago. Other early millipedes from the Ludlow Epoch are represented by Kampecaris obanensis and Archidesmus sp. from 425 million years ago. Pneumodesmus newmani was once argued to be the earliest member of the millipedes from the late Wenlock epoch of the late Silurian around 428 million years ago, but recent studies indicate that the dating method was erroneous, and that the taxon most likely originated during the Pridoli Epoch of the late Silurian or the Lochkovian of the early Devonian. During the Carboniferous, Arthropleura became the largest known land-dwelling invertebrate on record, with a length exceeding 2 m (6 1/2 ft). The reason that Arthropleura was able to achieve this size is not clearly known; early studies posited that it was a result of high atmospheric oxygen levels, while later studies considered that other factors were more probable. Millipedes also exhibit the earliest evidence of chemical defense, as some Devonian fossils have defensive gland openings called ozopores.

=== Living groups ===
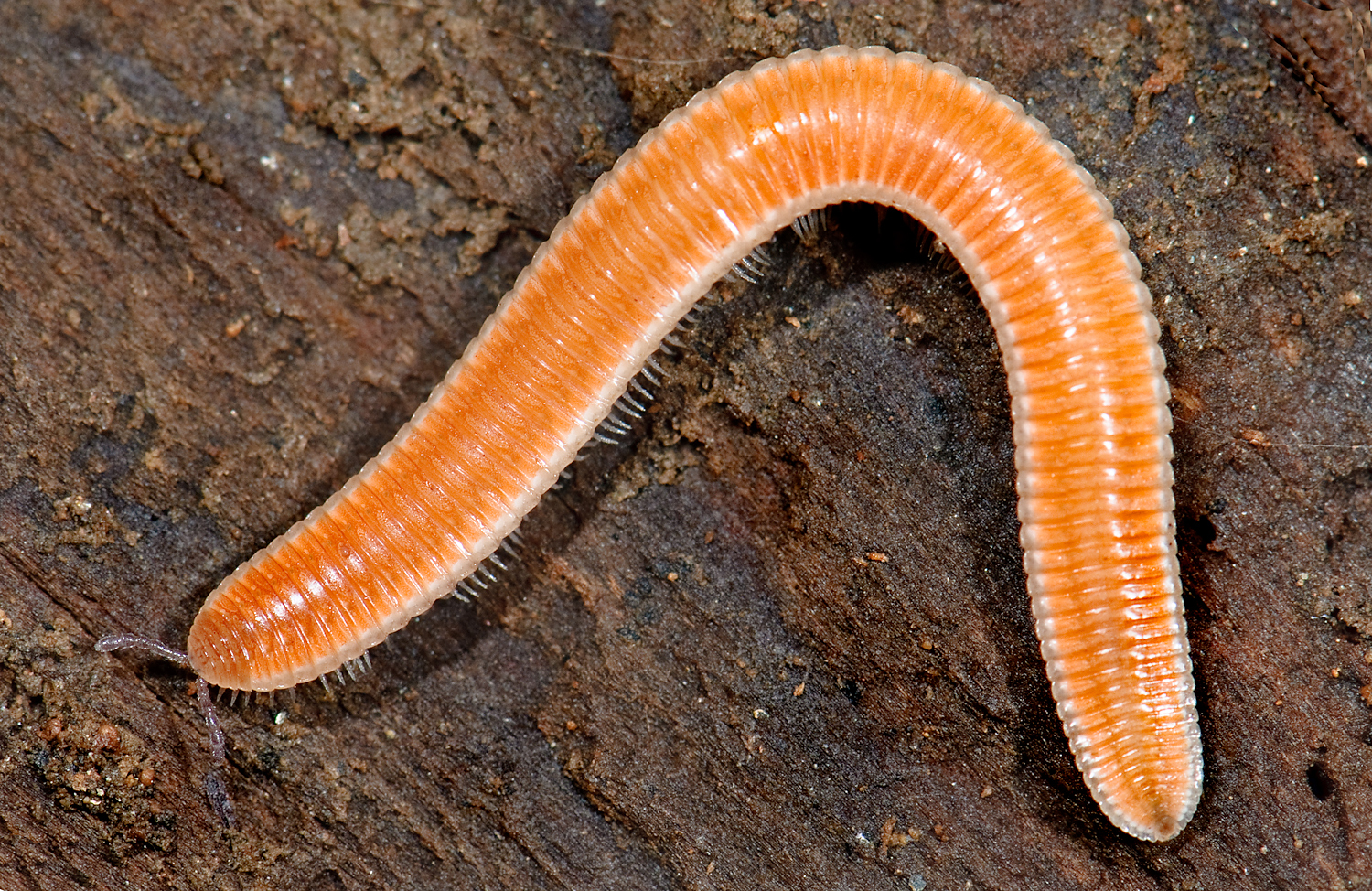
Octoglena sierra (Colobognatha, Polyzoniida)

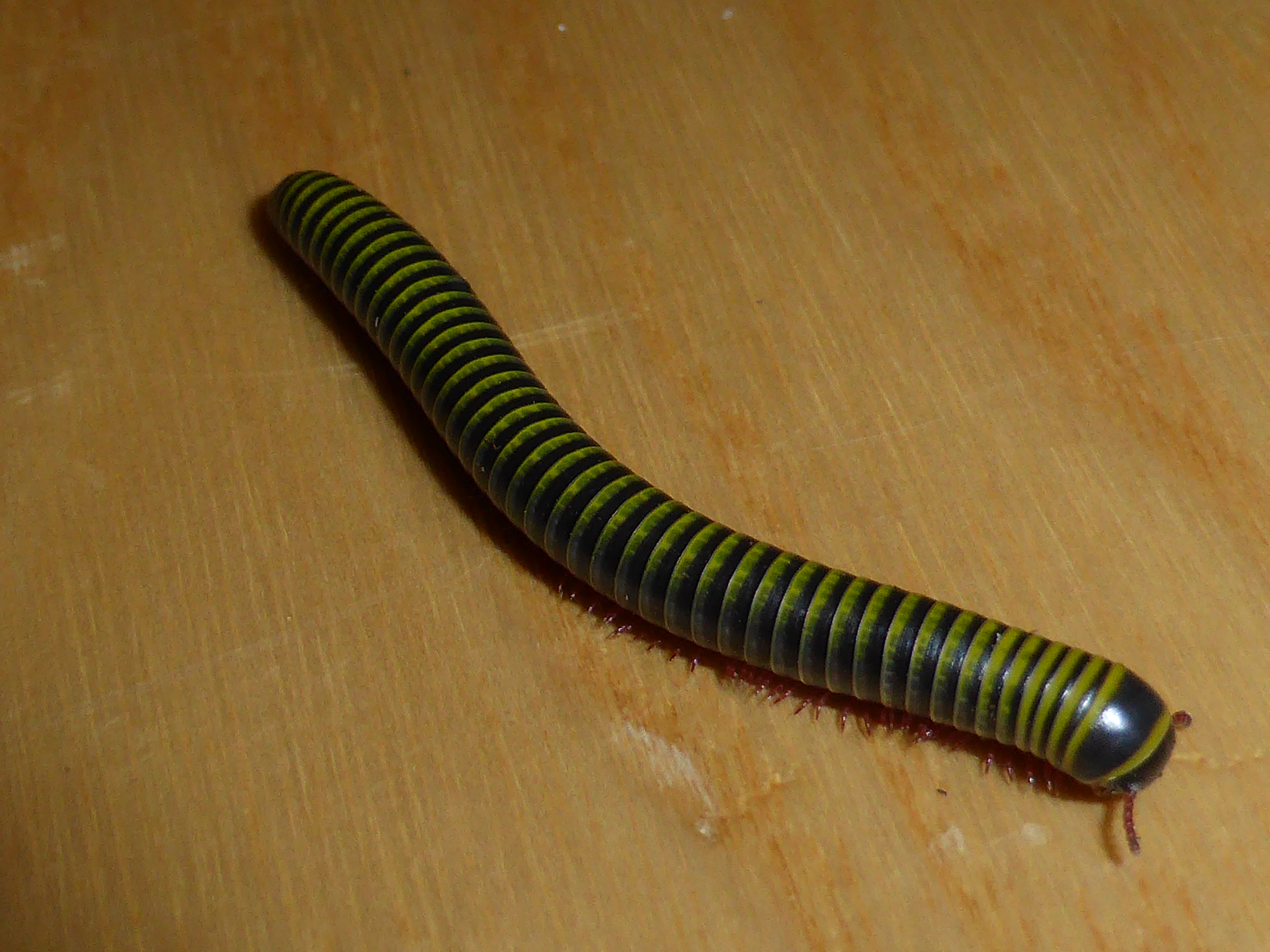
Anadenobolus monilicornis (Juliformia, Spirobolida)

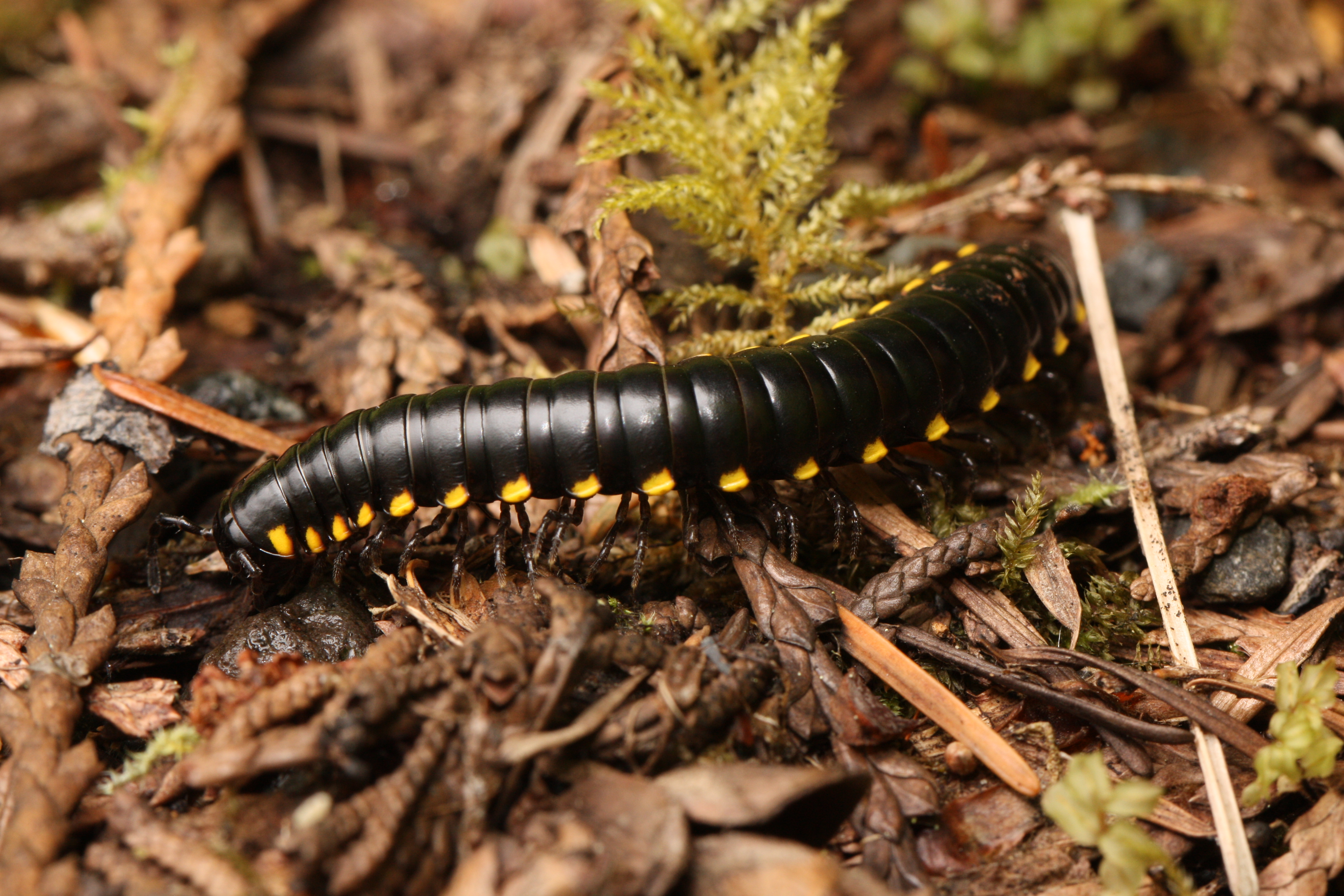
Harpaphe haydeniana (Polydesmida)

The history of scientific millipede classification began with Carl Linnaeus, who in his 10th edition of Systema Naturae, in 1758, named seven species of Julus as "Insecta Aptera" (wingless insects). In 1802, the French zoologist Pierre André Latreille proposed the name Chilognatha as the first group of what are now the Diplopoda, and in 1840 the German naturalist Johann Friedrich von Brandt produced the first detailed classification. The name Diplopoda itself was coined in 1844 by the French zoologist Henri Marie Ducrotay de Blainville. From 1890 to 1940, millipede taxonomy was driven by relatively few researchers at any given time, with major contributions by Carl Attems, Karl Wilhelm Verhoeff and Ralph Vary Chamberlin, who each described over 1,000 species, as well as Orator F. Cook, Filippo Silvestri, R. I. Pocock, and Henry W. Brölemann. This was a period when the science of diplopodology flourished: rates of species descriptions were on average the highest in history, sometimes exceeding 300 per year.

In 1971, the Dutch biologist C. A. W. Jeekel published a comprehensive listing of all known millipede genera and families described between 1758 and 1957 in his Nomenclator Generum et Familiarum Diplopodorum, a work credited as launching the "modern era" of millipede taxonomy. In 1980, the American biologist Richard L. Hoffman published a classification of millipedes which recognized the Penicillata, Pentazonia, and Helminthomorpha, and the first phylogenetic analysis of millipede orders using modern cladistic methods was published in 1984 by Henrik Enghoff of Denmark. A 2003 classification by the American myriapodologist Rowland Shelley is similar to the one originally proposed by Verhoeff, and remains the currently accepted classification scheme (shown below), despite more recent molecular studies proposing conflicting relationships. A 2011 summary of millipede family diversity by William A. Shear placed the order Siphoniulida within the larger group Nematophora.

- Diplopoda
  - Penicillata
    - Polyxenida
  - Chilognatha
    - Pentazonia
      - Limacomorpha
        Glomeridesmida
      - Oniscomorpha
        - Glomerida
        - Sphaerotheriida
    - Helminthomorpha
      - Colobognatha
        - Platydesmida
        - Siphonocryptida
        - Polyzoniida
        - Siphonophorida
      - Eugnatha
        - Nematophora
          - Chordeumatida
          - Callipodida
          - Stemmiulida
          - Siphoniulida
        - Merocheta
          - Polydesmida
        - Juliformia
          - Julida
          - Spirobolida
          - Spirostreptida

=== Fossil record ===
In addition to the 16 living orders, there are 9 extinct orders and one superfamily known only from fossils. The relationship of these to living groups and to each other is controversial. The extinct Arthropleuridea was long considered a distinct myriapod class, although work in the early 21st century established the group as a subclass of millipedes. Several living orders also appear in the fossil record. Below are two proposed arrangements of fossil millipede groups. Extinct groups are indicated with a dagger (†). The extinct order Zosterogrammida, a chilognath of uncertain position, is not shown.

- - Penicillata
    - †Arthropleuridea
      - †Arthropleurida
      - †Eoarthropleurida
    - Polyxenida
  - - †Microdecemplicida
    - Chilognatha

Alternate hypothesis of fossil relationships

- Diplopoda
  - Penicillata
    Polyxenida
  - Chilognatha
    - †Arthropleuridea
      - †Arthropleurida
      - †Eoarthropleurida
      - †Microdecemplicida
    - - Pentazonia
        †Amynilyspedida
      - Helminthomorpha
        - †Archipolypoda
          - †Archidesmida
          - †Cowiedesmida
          - †Euphoberiida
          - †Palaeosomatida
        - - †Pleurojulida
          - Colobognatha
          - Eugnatha
            - - Nematophora
              - Polydesmida
            - Juliformia
              - Julida
              - Spirobolida
              - Spirostreptida
              - †Xyloiuloidea

=== Relation to other myriapods ===
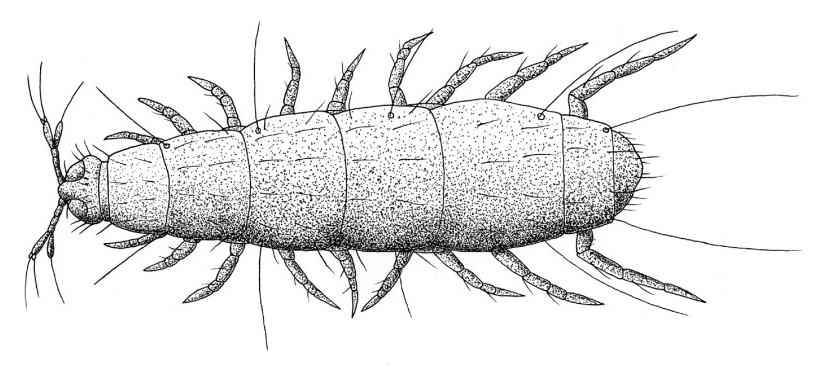
Pauropods are thought to be the closest relative of millipedes.

Although the relationships of millipede orders are still a subject of debate, the class Diplopoda as a whole is considered a monophyletic group of arthropods: all millipedes are more closely related to each other than to any other arthropods. Diplopoda is a class within the arthropod subphylum Myriapoda, the myriapods, which includes centipedes (class Chilopoda) as well as the lesser-known pauropods (class Pauropoda) and symphylans (class Symphyla). Within myriapods, the closest relatives or sister group of millipedes has long been considered the pauropods, which also have a collum and diplosegments.

=== Distinction from centipedes ===
The differences between millipedes and centipedes are a common question from the general public. Both groups of myriapods share similarities, such as long, multi-segmented bodies, many legs, a single pair of antennae, and the presence of postantennal organs, but have many differences and distinct evolutionary histories, as the most recent common ancestor of centipedes and millipedes lived around 450 to 475 million years ago in the Silurian. The head alone exemplifies the differences; millipedes have short, geniculate (elbowed) antennae for probing the substrate, a pair of robust mandibles and a single pair of maxillae fused into a lip; centipedes have long, threadlike antennae, a pair of small mandibles, two pairs of maxillae and a pair of large poison claws.

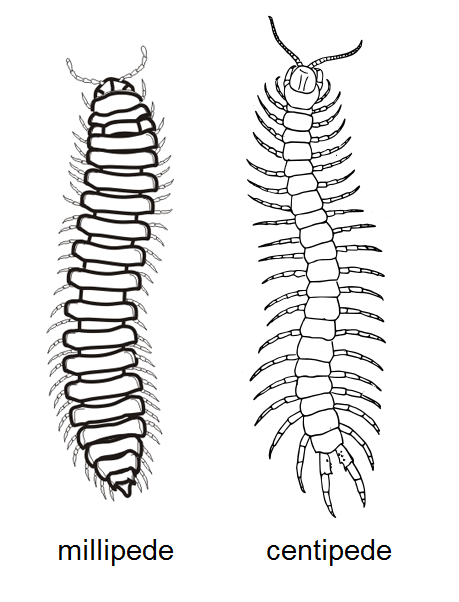
A representative millipede and centipede (not necessarily to scale)

Millipede and centipede differences
| Trait | Millipedes | Centipedes |
|---|---|---|
| Legs | Two pairs on most body segments; attached to underside of body | One pair per body segment; attached to sides of body; last pair extends backwards |
| Locomotion | Generally adapted for burrowing or inhabiting small crevices; slow-moving | Generally adapted for running, except for the burrowing soil centipedes |
| Feeding | Primarily detritivores, some herbivores, few carnivores; no venom | Primarily carnivores with front legs modified into venomous fangs |
| Spiracles | On underside of body | On the sides or top of body |
| Reproductive openings | Third body segment | Last body segment |
| Reproductive behaviour | Male generally inserts spermatophore into female with gonopods | Male produces spermatophore that is usually picked up by female |

== Characteristics ==
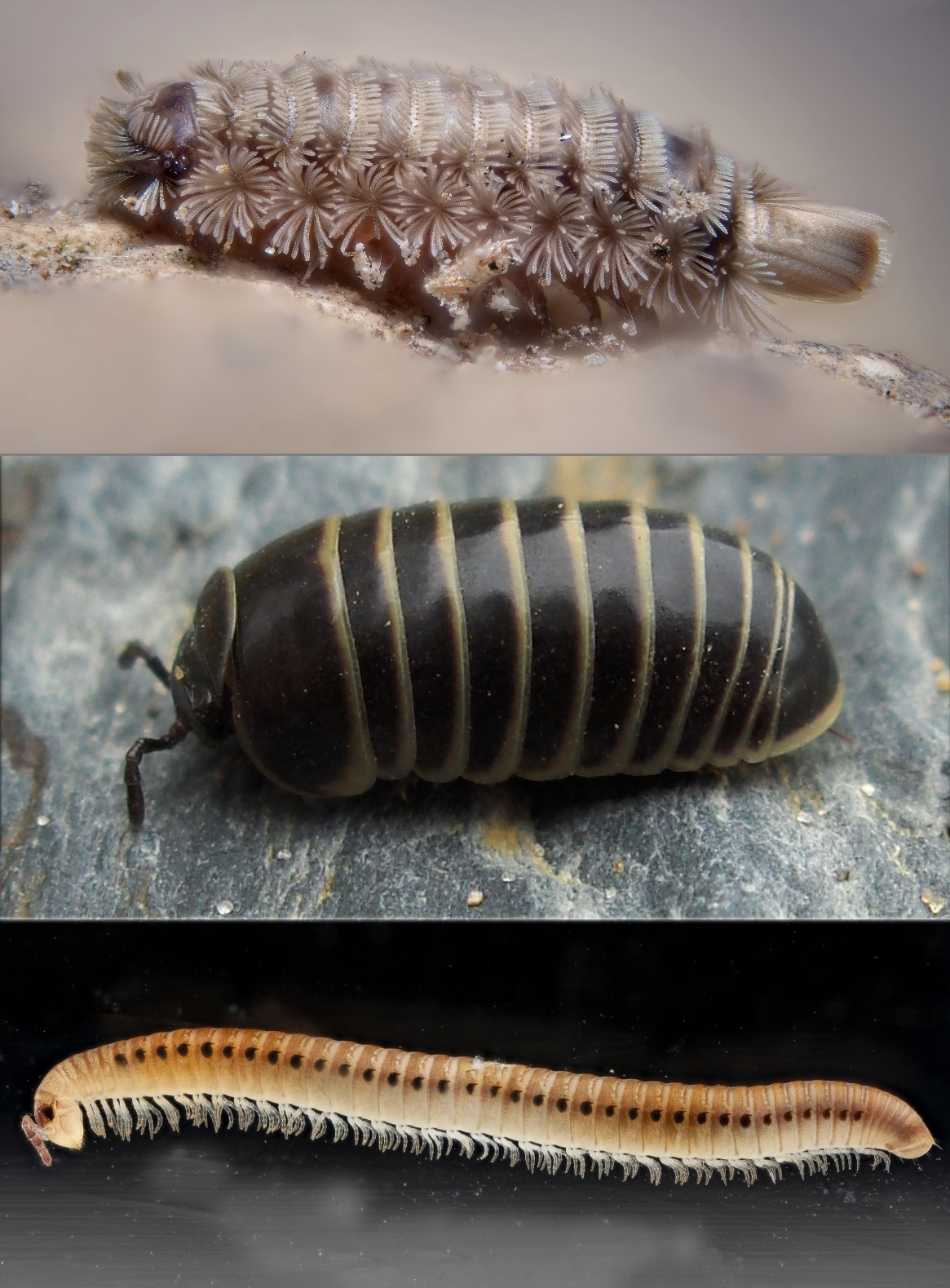
Representative body types of the Penicillata (top), Pentazonia (middle), and Helminthomorpha (bottom)

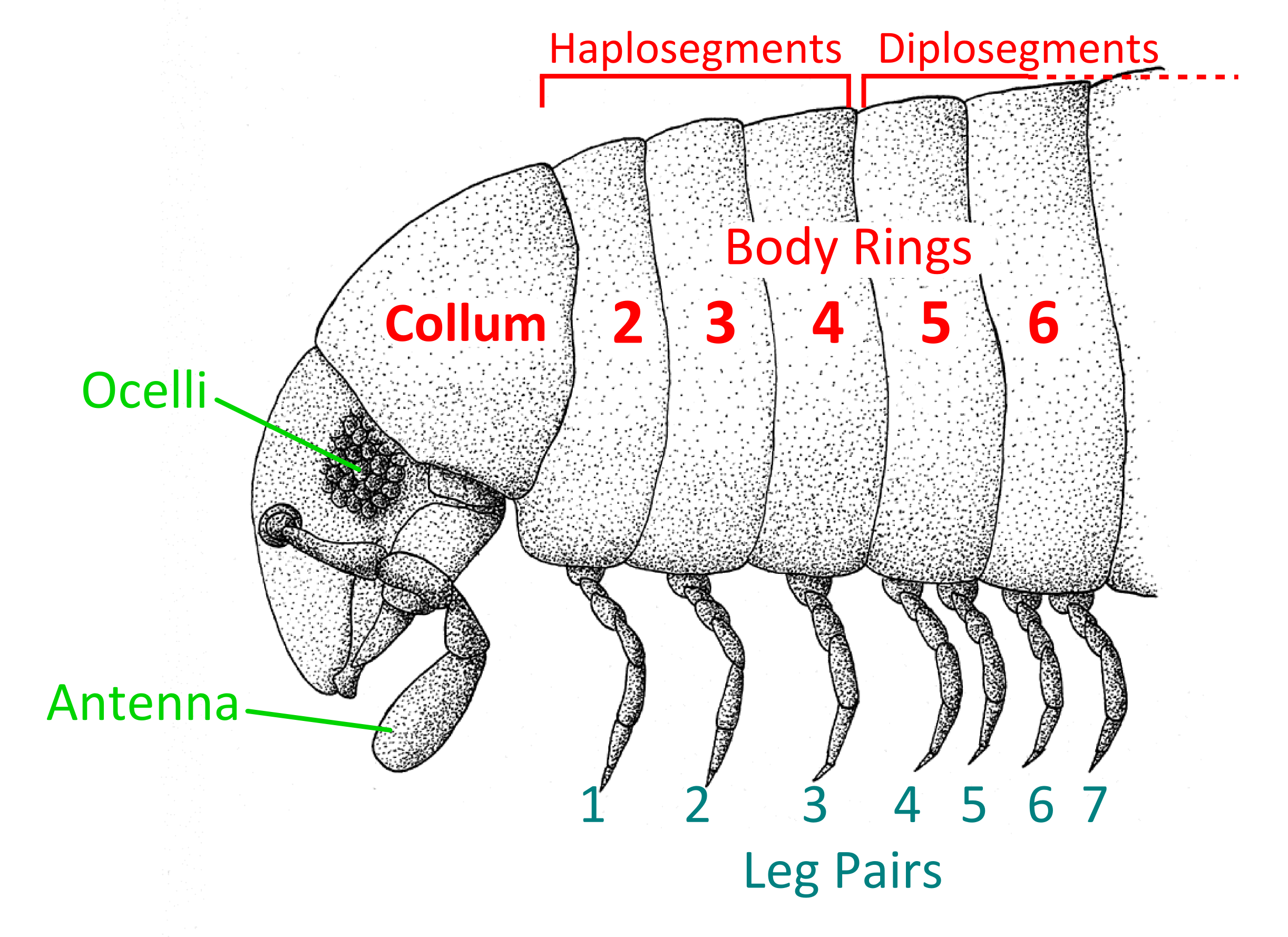
Anterior anatomy of a generalized helminthomorph millipede

Millipedes come in a variety of body shapes and sizes, ranging from 2 mm (1/16 in) to around 35 cm (14 in) in length, and can have as few as eleven to over three hundred segments. They are generally black or brown in colour, although there are a few brightly coloured species, and some have aposematic colouring to warn that they are toxic. Species of Motyxia produce cyanide as a chemical defence and are bioluminescent.

Body styles vary greatly between major millipede groups. In the basal subclass Penicillata, consisting of the tiny bristle millipedes, the exoskeleton is soft and uncalcified, and is covered in prominent setae or bristles. All other millipedes, belonging to the subclass Chilognatha, have a hardened exoskeleton. The chilognaths are in turn divided into two infraclasses: the Pentazonia, containing relatively short-bodied groups such as pill millipedes, and the Helminthomorpha ("worm-like" millipedes), which contains the vast majority of species, with long, many-segmented bodies.

Millipedes have also lost the gene that codes for the JHAMTl enzyme, which is responsible for catalysing the last step of the production of a juvenile hormone that regulates the development and reproduction in other arthropods like crustaceans, centipedes and insects.

=== Head ===
The head of a millipede is typically rounded above and flattened below and bears a pair of large mandibles in front of a plate-like structure called a gnathochilarium ("jaw lip"). The head contains a single pair of antennae with seven or eight segments and a group of sensory cones at the tip. Many orders also possess a pair of sensory organs known as the Tömösváry organs, shaped as small oval rings posterior and lateral to the base of the antennae. Their function is unknown, but they also occur in some centipedes, and are possibly used to measure humidity or light levels in the surrounding environment.

Millipede eyes consist of several simple flat-lensed ocelli arranged in a group or patch on each side of the head. These patches are also called ocular fields or ocellaria. Many species of millipedes, including the entire orders Polydesmida, Siphoniulida, Glomeridesmida, Siphonophorida and Platydesmida, and cave-dwelling millipedes such as Causeyella and Trichopetalum, had ancestors that could see but have subsequently lost their eyes and are blind.

=== Body ===
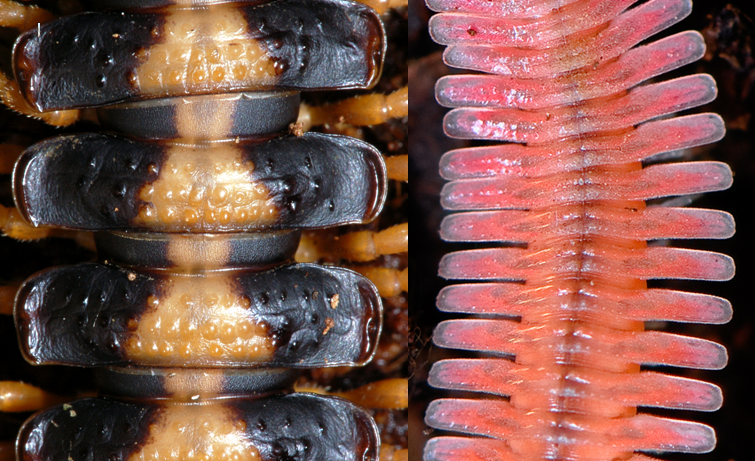
Paranota of polydesmidan (left) and platydesmidan millipedes

Millipede bodies may be flattened or cylindrical, and are composed of numerous metameric segments, each with an exoskeleton consisting of four chitinous plates: a single plate above (the tergite), one at each side (pleurites), and a plate on the underside (sternite) where the legs attach. In many millipedes, such as Merocheta and Juliformia, these plates are fused to varying degrees, sometimes forming a single cylindrical ring. The plates are typically hard, impregnated with calcium salts. Because they can't close their permanently open spiracles and most species lack a waxy cuticle, millipedes are susceptible to water loss and with a few exceptions must spend most of their time in moist or humid environments.

The first segment behind the head is legless and known as a collum (from the Latin for neck or collar). The second, third, and fourth body segments bear a single pair of legs each and are known as "haplosegments" (the three haplosegments are sometimes referred to as a "thorax"). The remaining segments, from the fifth to the posterior, are properly known as diplosegments or double segments, formed by the fusion of two embryonic segments. Each diplosegment bears two pairs of legs, rather than just one as in centipedes. In some millipedes, the last few segments may be legless. The terms "segment" or "body ring" are often used interchangeably to refer to both haplo- and diplosegments. The final segment is known as the telson and consists of a legless preanal ring, a pair of anal valves (closeable plates around the anus), and a small scale below the anus.

Millipedes in several orders have keel-like extensions of the body-wall known as paranota, which can vary widely in shape, size, and texture; modifications include lobes, papillae, ridges, crests, spines and notches. Paranota may allow millipedes to wedge more securely into crevices, protect the legs, or make the millipede more difficult for predators to swallow.

The legs are composed of seven segments, and attach on the underside of the body. The legs of an individual are generally rather similar to each other, although often longer in males than females, and males of some species may have a reduced or enlarged first pair of legs. The most conspicuous leg modifications are involved in reproduction, discussed below. Despite the common name, common species have between 34 and 400 legs, and no millipede was known to have 1,000 legs until 2021, when a species was discovered underground in Western Australia, Eumillipes persephone, some of whose individuals possess a record 1,306 legs – more by far than any other creature on Earth.

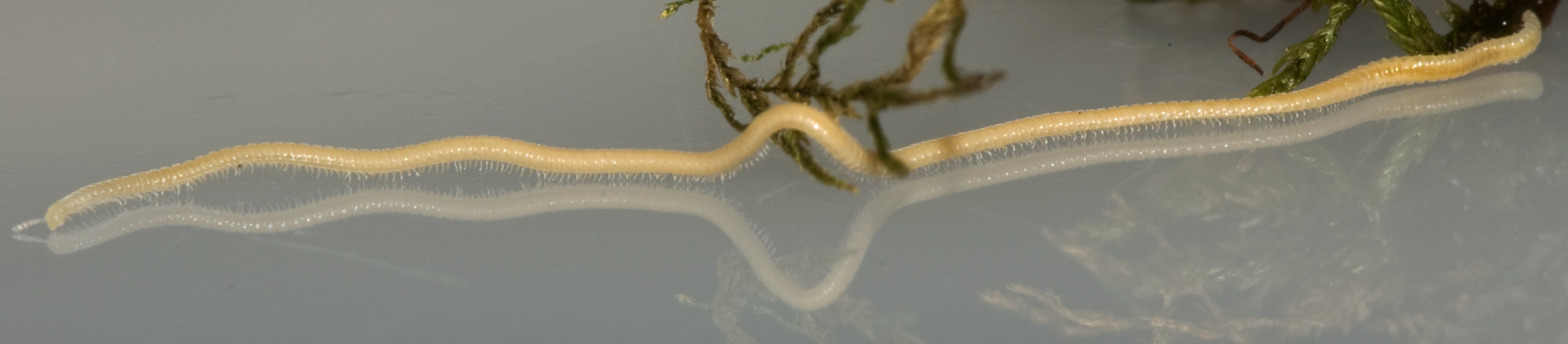
A female Illacme plenipes with 618 legs (309 pairs)

=== Internal organs ===
Millipedes breathe through two pairs of spiracles located ventrally on each segment near the base of the legs. Each opens into an internal pouch, and connects to a system of tracheae. The heart runs the entire length of the body, with an aorta stretching into the head. The excretory organs are two pairs of malpighian tubules, located near the mid-part of the gut. The digestive tract is a simple tube with two pairs of salivary glands to help digest the food.

== Reproduction and growth ==
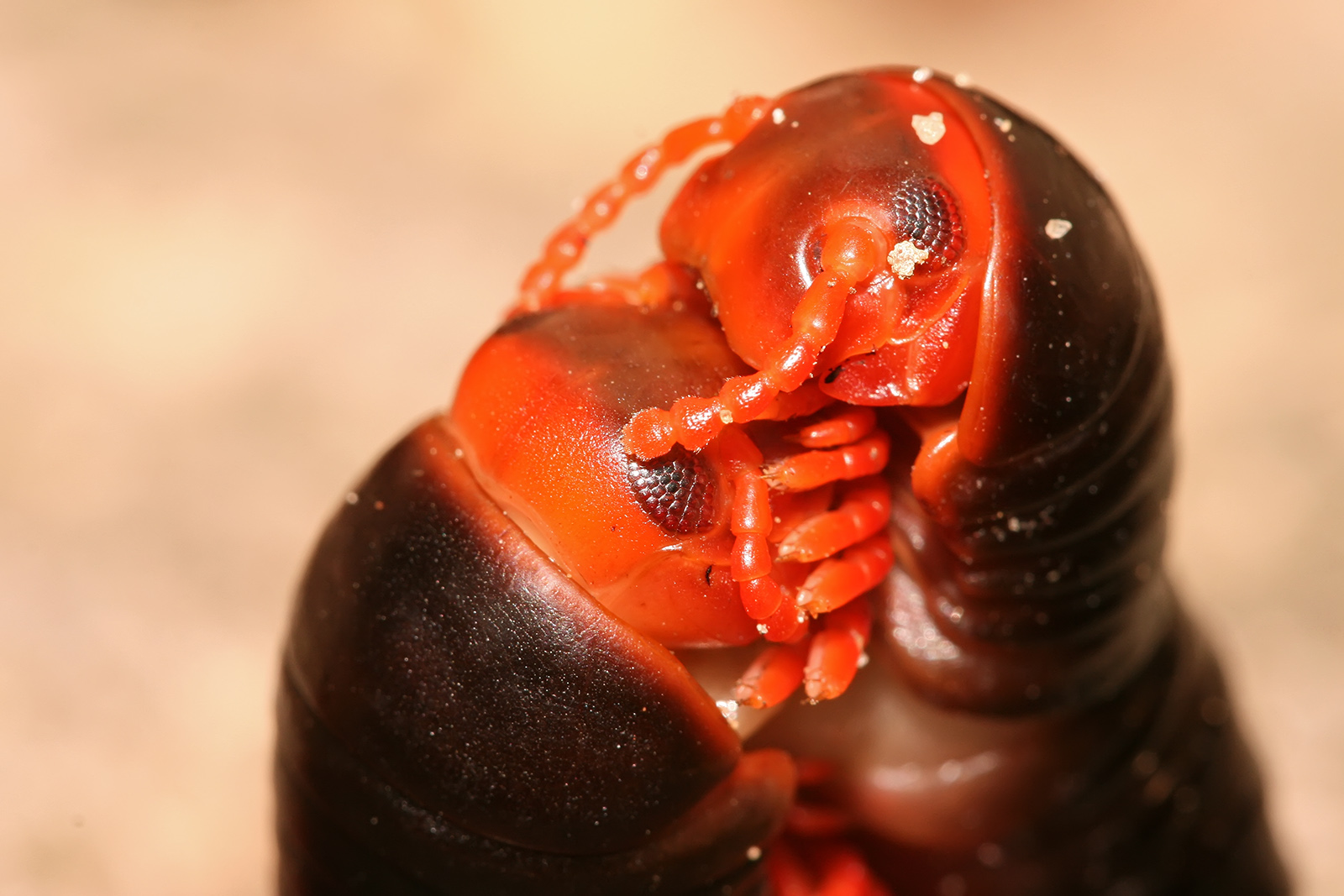
Epibolus pulchripes mating; the male is on the right

Millipedes show a diversity of mating styles and structures. In the basal order Polyxenida (bristle millipedes), mating is indirect: males deposit spermatophores onto webs they secrete with special glands, and the spermatophores are subsequently picked up by females. In all other millipede groups, males possess one or two pairs of modified legs called gonopods which are used to transfer sperm to the female during copulation. The location of the gonopods differs between groups: in males of the Pentazonia they are located at the rear of the body and known as telopods and may also function in grasping females, while in the Helminthomorpha – the vast majority of species – they are located on the seventh body segment. A few species are parthenogenetic, having few, if any, males.

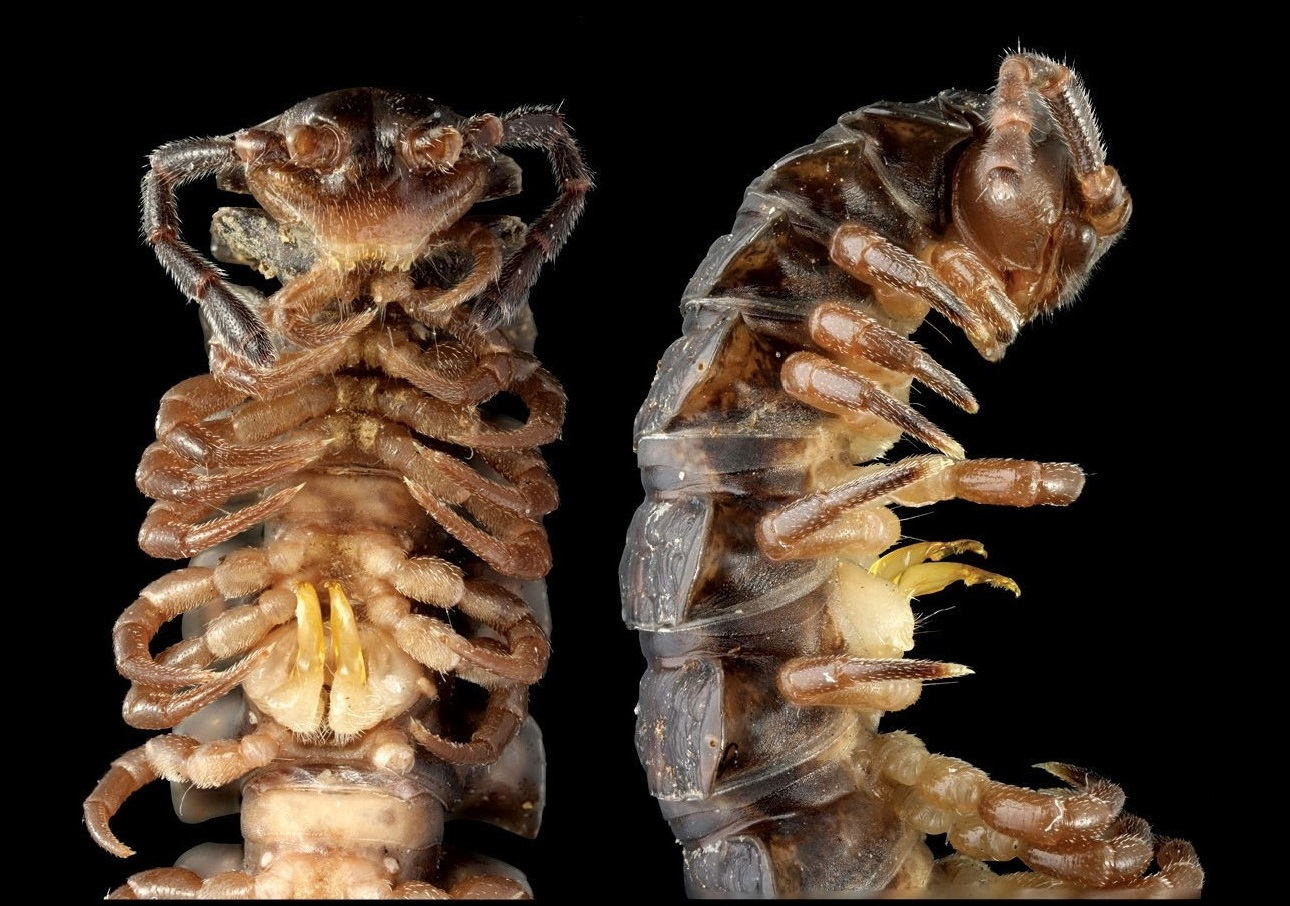
The gonopods of Nipponesmus shirinensis are quite unlike its walking legs.

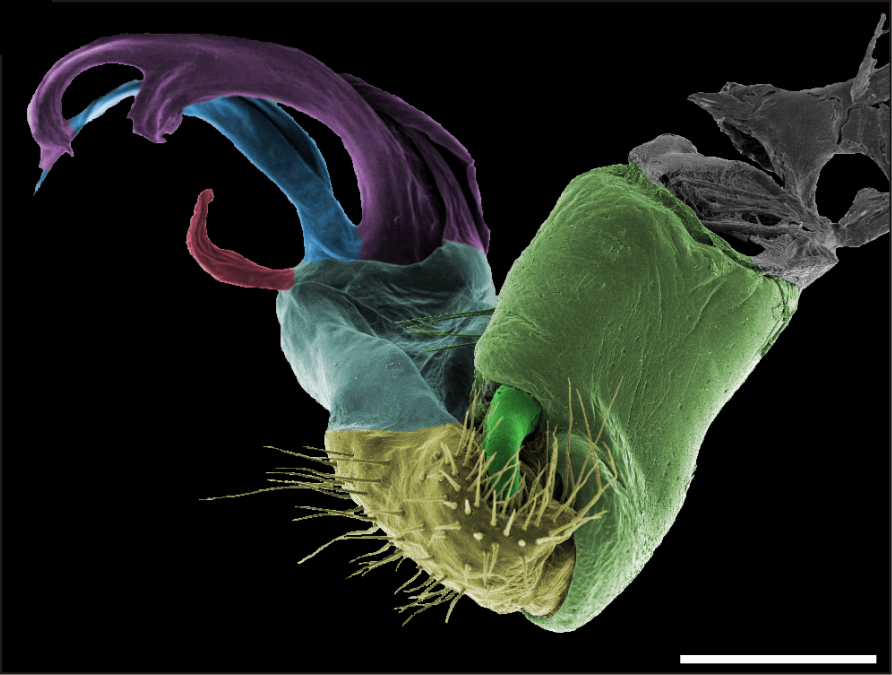
Left gonopod of Oxidus gracilis. False colour SEM image, scale bar: 0.2 mm

Gonopods occur in a diversity of shapes and sizes, and in the range from closely resembling walking legs to complex structures quite unlike legs at all. In some groups, the gonopods are kept retracted within the body; in others they project forward parallel to the body. Gonopod morphology is the predominant means of determining species among millipedes: the structures may differ greatly between closely related species but very little within a species. The gonopods develop gradually from walking legs through successive moults until reproductive maturity.

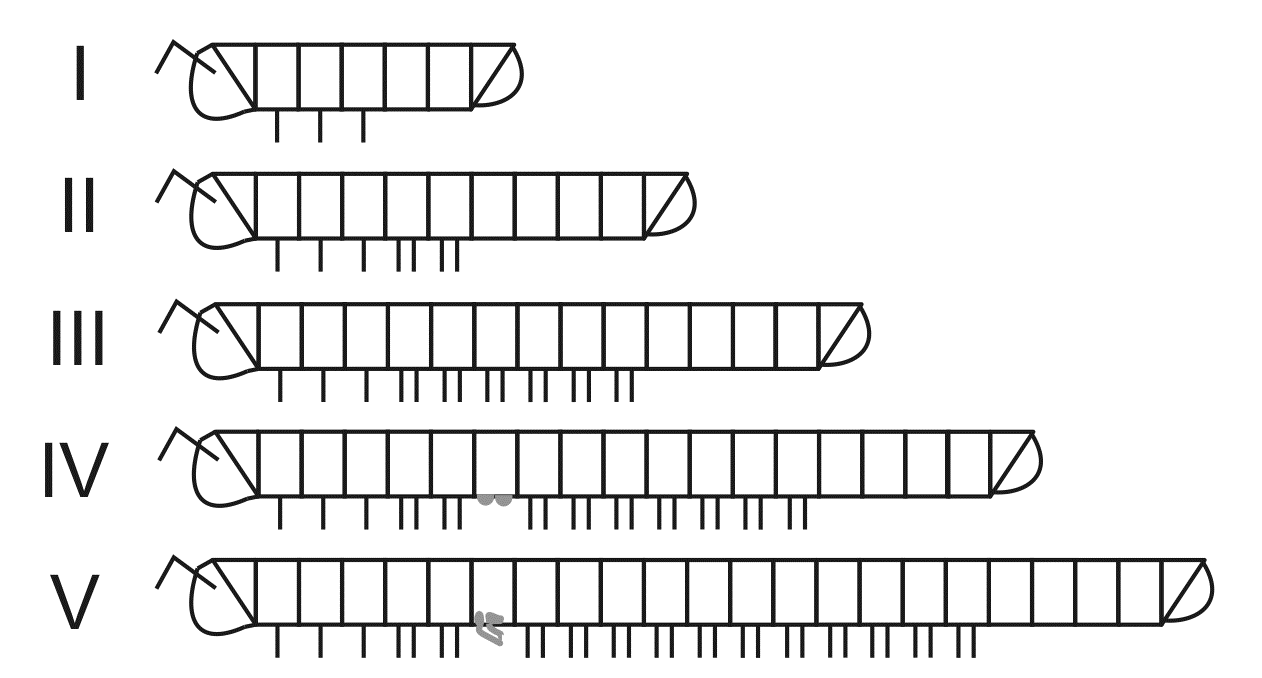
Growth stages of Nemasoma (Nemasomatidae), which reaches reproductive maturity in stage V

The genital openings (gonopores) of both sexes are located on the underside of the third body segment (near the second pair of legs) and may be accompanied in the male by one or two penes which deposit the sperm packets onto the gonopods. In the female, the genital pores open into paired small sacs called cyphopods or vulvae, which are covered by small hood-like lids, and are used to store the sperm after copulation. The cyphopod morphology can also be used to identify species. Millipede sperm lack flagella, a unique trait among myriapods.

In all except the bristle millipedes, copulation occurs with the two individuals facing one another. Copulation may be preceded by male behaviours such as tapping with antennae, running along the back of the female, offering edible glandular secretions, or in the case of some pill-millipedes, stridulation or "chirping". During copulation in most millipedes, the male positions his seventh segment in front of the female's third segment, and may insert his gonopods to extrude the vulvae before bending his body to deposit sperm onto his gonopods and reinserting the "charged" gonopods into the female.

Females lay from ten to three hundred eggs at a time, depending on species, fertilising them with the stored sperm as they do so. Many species deposit the eggs on moist soil or organic detritus, but some construct nests lined with dried faeces, and may protect the eggs within silk cocoons. In most species, the female abandons the eggs after they are laid, but some species in the orders Platydesmida and Stemmiulida provide parental care for eggs and young.

The young hatch after a few weeks, and typically have only three pairs of legs, followed by up to four legless segments. As they grow, they continually moult, adding further segments and legs as they do so, a mode of development known as anamorphosis. Some species moult within specially prepared chambers of soil or silk, and may also shelter in these during wet weather, and most species eat the discarded exoskeleton after moulting. The adult stage, when individuals become reproductively mature, is generally reached in the final moult stage, which varies between species and orders, although some species continue to moult after adulthood. Furthermore, some species alternate between reproductive and non-reproductive stages after maturity, a phenomenon known as periodomorphosis, in which the reproductive structures regress during non-reproductive stages. Millipedes may live from one to ten years, depending on species.

== Ecology ==
=== Habitat and distribution ===
Millipedes occur on all continents except Antarctica, and occupy almost all terrestrial habitats, ranging as far north as the Arctic Circle in Iceland, Norway, and Central Russia, and as far south as Santa Cruz Province, Argentina. Typically forest floor dwellers, they live in leaf litter, dead wood, or soil, with a preference for humid conditions. In temperate zones, millipedes are most abundant in moist deciduous forests, and may reach densities of over 1,000 individuals per square metre. Other habitats include coniferous forests, caves, and alpine ecosystems. Deserticolous millipedes, species evolved to live in the desert, like Orthoporus ornatus, may show adaptations like a waxy epicuticle and the ability of water uptake from unsaturated air. Some species can survive freshwater floods and live submerged underwater for up to 11 months. A few species occur near the seashore and can survive in somewhat salty conditions.

=== Burrowing ===
The diplosegments of millipedes have evolved in conjunction with their burrowing habits, and nearly all millipedes adopt a mainly subterranean lifestyle. They use three main methods of burrowing: bulldozing, wedging and boring. Members of the orders Julida, Spirobolida and Spirostreptida lower their heads and barge their way into the substrate, the collum leading the way. Flat-backed millipedes in the order Polydesmida tend to insert their front end, like a wedge, into a horizontal crevice, and then widen the crack by pushing upwards with their legs, the paranota in this instance constituting the main lifting surface. Boring is used by members of the order Polyzoniida. These have smaller segments at the front and increasingly large ones further back; they propel themselves forward into a crack with their legs, the wedge-shaped body widening the gap as they go. Some millipedes have adopted an above-ground lifestyle and lost the burrowing habit. This may be because they are too small to have enough leverage to burrow, or because they are too large to make the effort worthwhile, or in some cases because they move relatively fast (for a millipede) and are active predators.

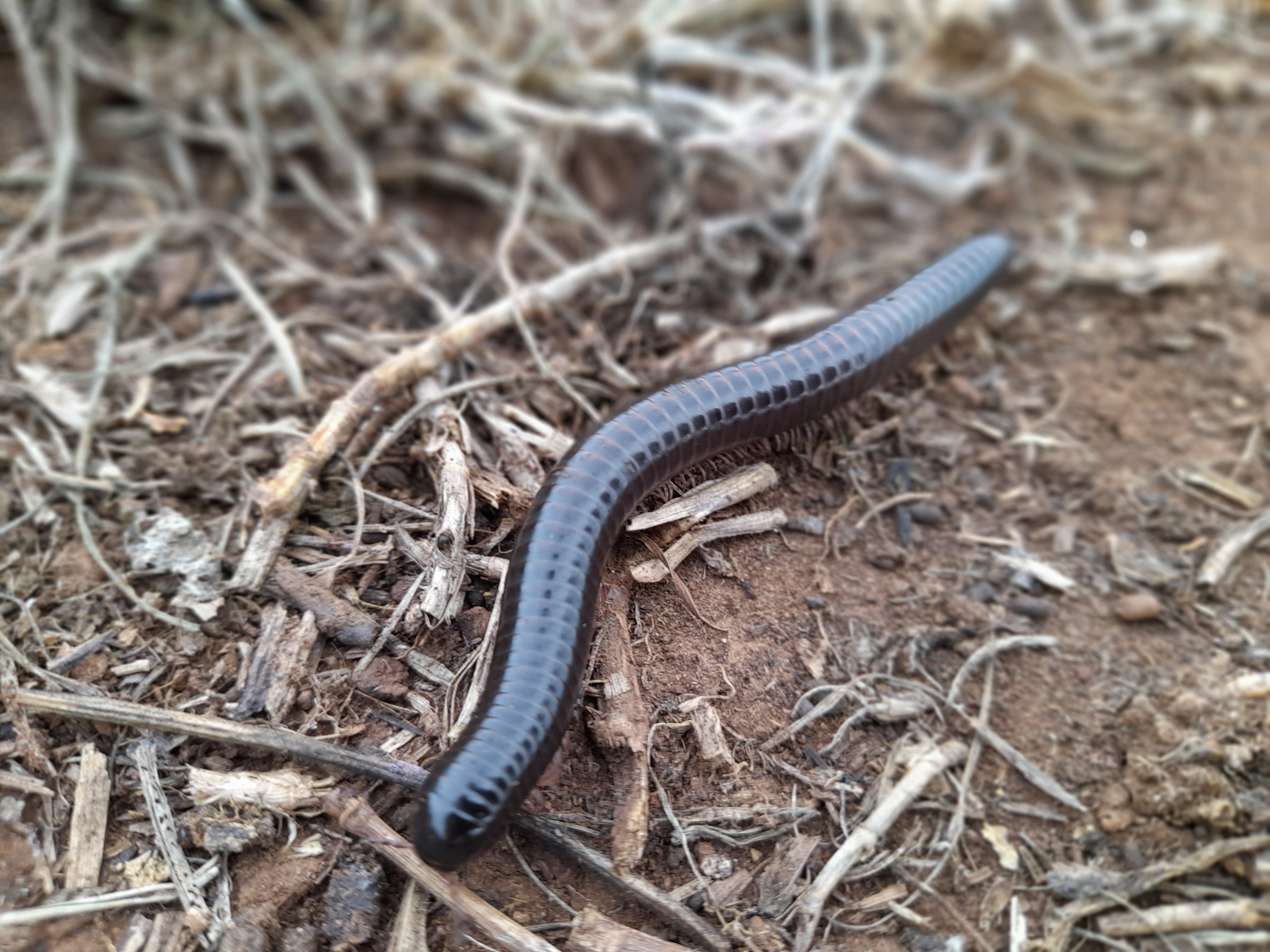
finding a burrow

Burrowing activity when associated with the mixing of organic matter with mineral matter makes millipedes efficient soil ecosystem engineers, in particular in areas from which burrowing earthworms are absent for ecological or historical reasons.

=== Diet ===
Most millipedes are detritivores and feed on decomposing vegetation, feces, or organic matter mixed with soil. They often play important roles in the breakdown and decomposition of plant litter: estimates of consumption rates for individual species range from 1 to 11 percent of all leaf litter, depending on species and region. The leaf litter is fragmented in the millipede gut and excreted as pellets of leaf fragments, algae, fungi, and bacteria, which facilitates further decomposition by the microorganisms. Where earthworm populations are low in tropical forests, millipedes play an important role in facilitating microbial decomposition of the leaf litter. Some millipedes are herbivorous, feeding on living plants, and some species can become serious pests of crops. Millipedes in the order Polyxenida graze algae from bark, and Platydesmida feed on fungi. A few species are omnivorous or in Callipodida and Chordeumatida occasionally carnivorous, feeding on insects, centipedes, earthworms, or snails. Some species have piercing mouth parts that allow them to suck up plant juices. Cave dwelling species in Julidae, Blaniulidae, and Polydesmidae have specialized mouthparts and appear to be filter feeders, filtering small particles from running water inside caves.

=== Predators and parasites ===
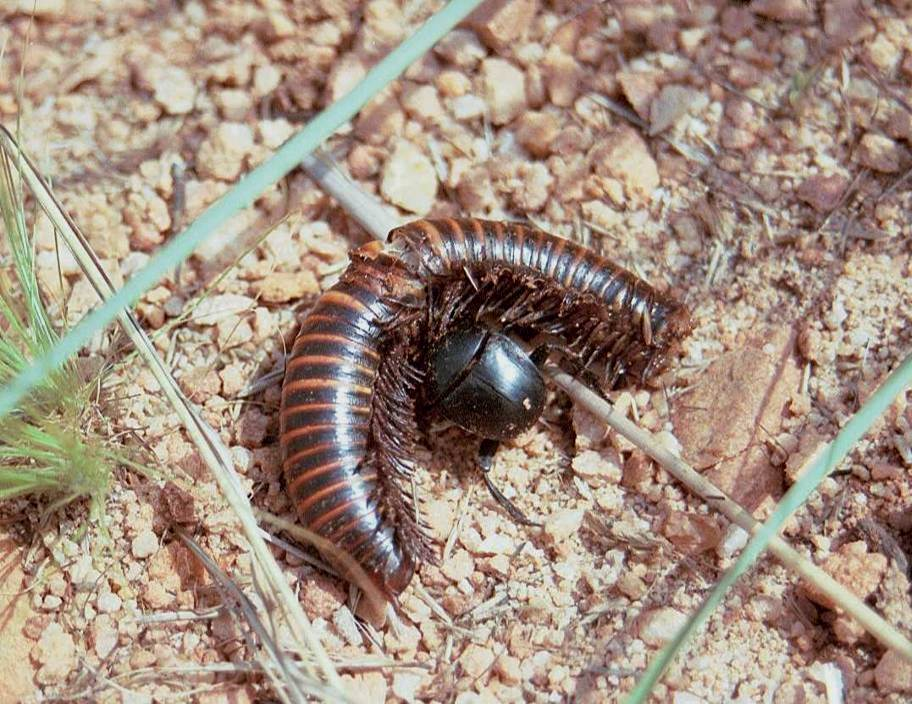
A Sceliages beetle transporting a millipede carcass

Millipedes are preyed on by a wide range of animals, including various reptiles, amphibians, birds, mammals, and insects. Mammalian predators such as coatis and meerkats roll captured millipedes on the ground to deplete and rub off their defensive secretions before consuming their prey, and certain poison dart frogs are believed to incorporate the toxic compounds of millipedes into their own defences. Several invertebrates have specialized behaviours or structures to feed on millipedes, including larval glowworm beetles, Probolomyrmex ants, chlamydephorid slugs, and predaceous dung beetles of the genera Sceliages and Deltochilum. A large subfamily of assassin bugs, the Ectrichodiinae with over 600 species, has specialised in preying upon millipedes. Parasites of millipedes include nematodes, phaeomyiid flies, and acanthocephalans. Nearly 30 fungal species of the order Laboulbeniales have been found growing externally on millipedes, but some species may be commensal rather than parasitic.

=== Defence mechanisms ===
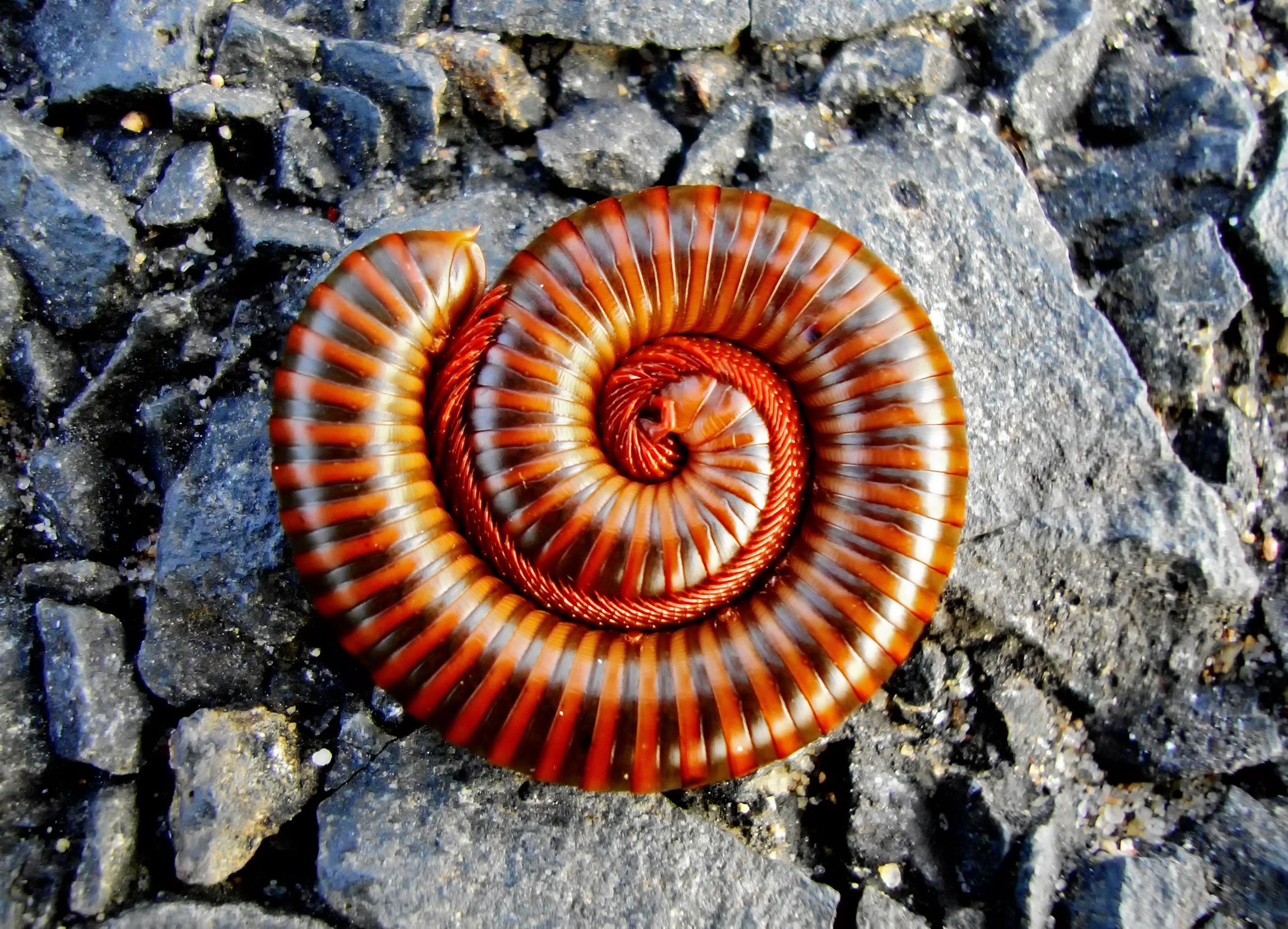
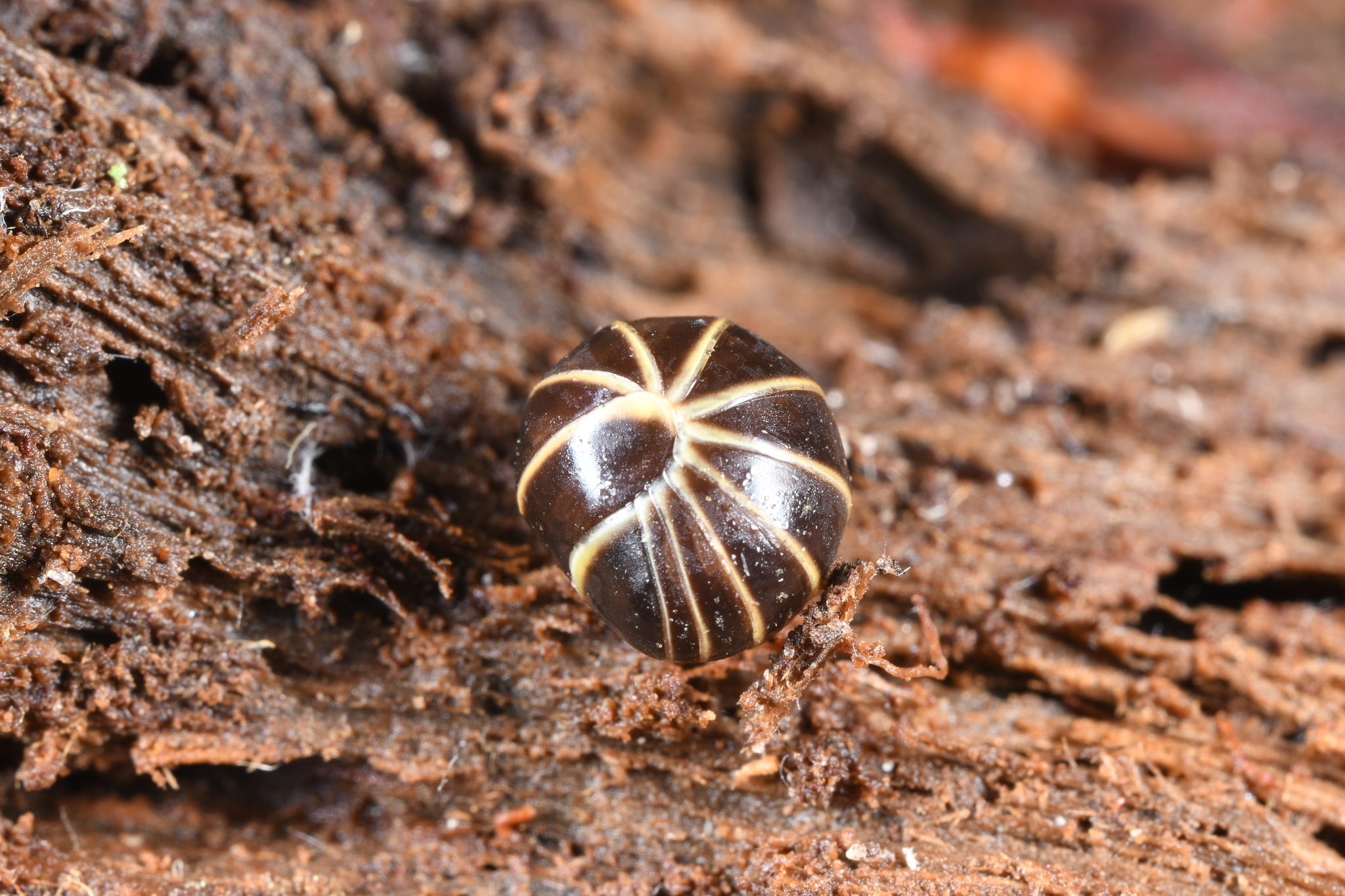
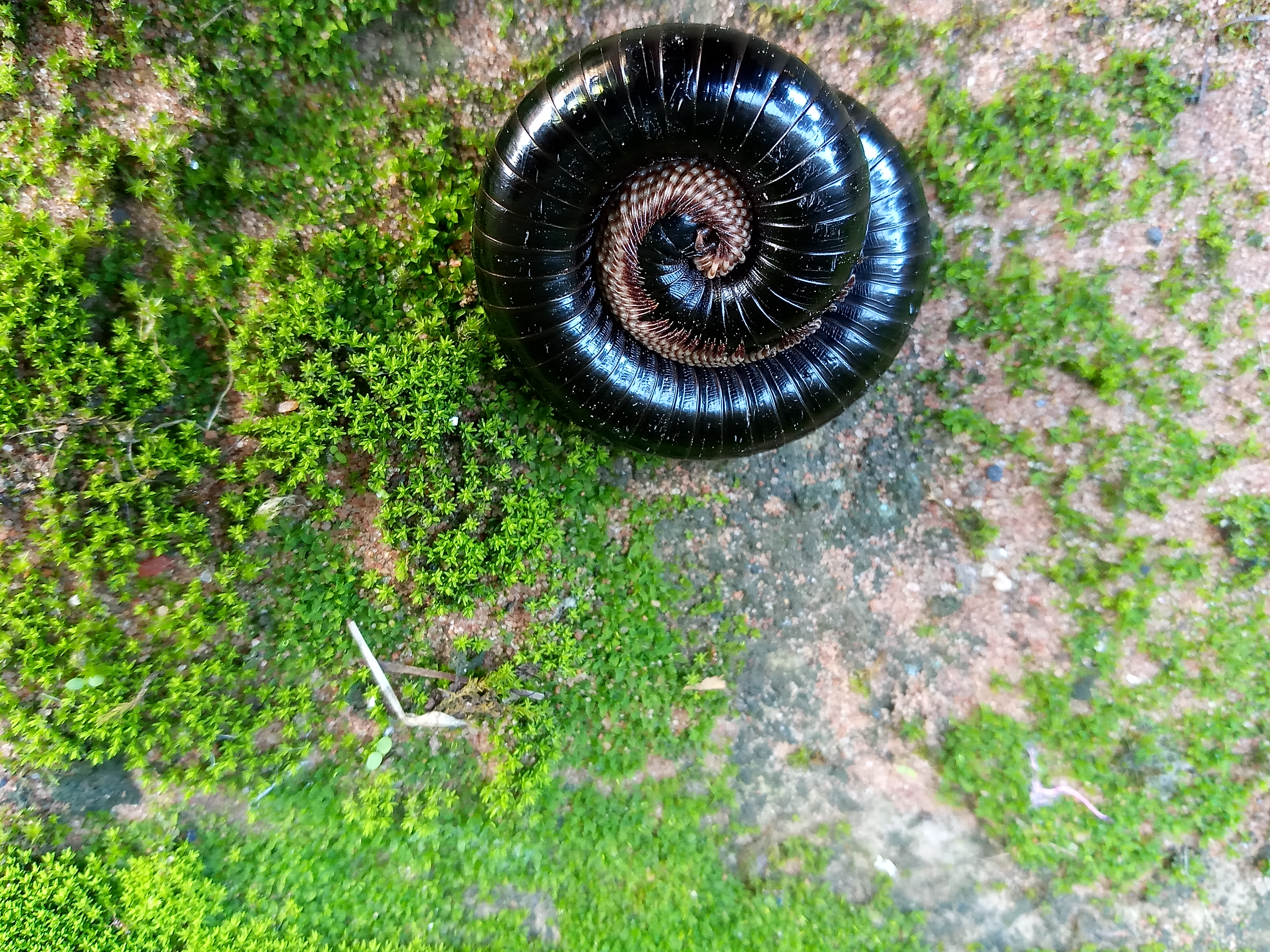
Juliform, oniscomorph and Archispirostreptus gigas millipedes curled in a defensive coil

Due to their lack of speed and their inability to bite or sting, millipedes' primary defence mechanism is to curl into a tight coil, thus protecting their delicate legs inside an armoured exoskeleton, a process called volvation or conglobation which is characteric of pill millipedes. Other millipedes commonly curl into a spiral when attacked or disturbed.

Many species also emit various foul-smelling liquid secretions through microscopic holes called ozopores (the openings of "odoriferous" or "repugnatorial glands"), along the sides of their bodies as a secondary defence. Among the many irritant and toxic chemicals found in these secretions are alkaloids, benzoquinones, phenols, terpenoids, and hydrogen cyanide. Some of these substances are caustic and can burn the exoskeleton of ants and other insect predators, and the skin and eyes of larger predators and humans. Primates such as capuchin monkeys and lemurs have been observed intentionally irritating millipedes in order to rub the chemicals on themselves to repel mosquitoes. Some of these defensive compounds also show antifungal activity.

The bristly millipedes (order Polyxenida) lack both an armoured exoskeleton and odoriferous glands, and instead are covered in numerous bristles that in at least one species, Polyxenus fasciculatus, detach and entangle ants.

=== Other inter-species interactions ===
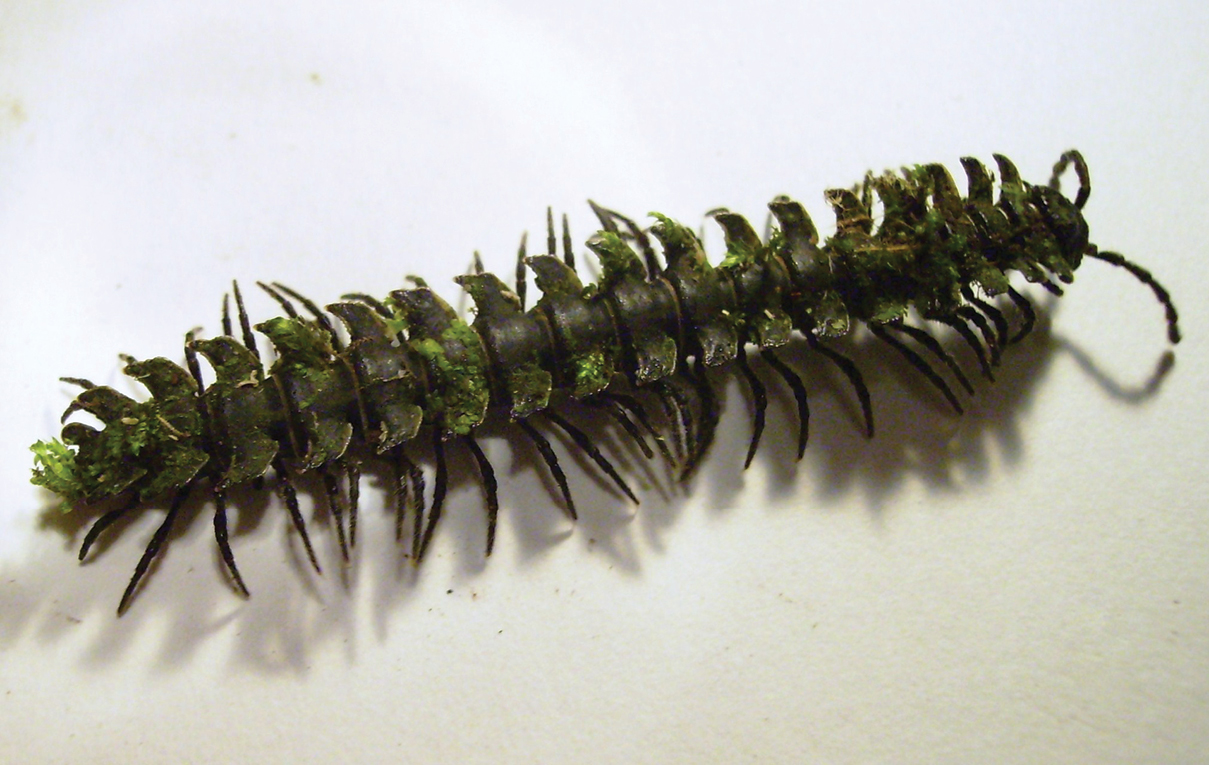
Psammodesmus bryophorus camouflaged with symbiotic mosses

Some millipedes form mutualistic relationships with organisms of other species, in which both species benefit from the interaction, or commensal relationships, in which only one species benefits while the other is unaffected. Several species form close relationships with ants, a relationship known as myrmecophily, especially within the family Pyrgodesmidae (Polydesmida), which contains "obligate myrmecophiles", species which have only been found in ant colonies. More species are "facultative myrmecophiles", non-exclusively associated with ants, including many species of Polyxenida that have been found in ant nests around the world.

Many millipede species have commensal relationships with mites of the orders Mesostigmata and Astigmata. Many of these mites are believed to be phoretic rather than parasitic, which means that they use the millipede host as a means of dispersal.

A novel interaction between millipedes and mosses was described in 2011, in which individuals of the newly discovered Psammodesmus bryophorus was found to have up to ten moss species living on its dorsal surface, in what may provide camouflage for the millipede and increased dispersal for the mosses.

== Interactions with humans ==
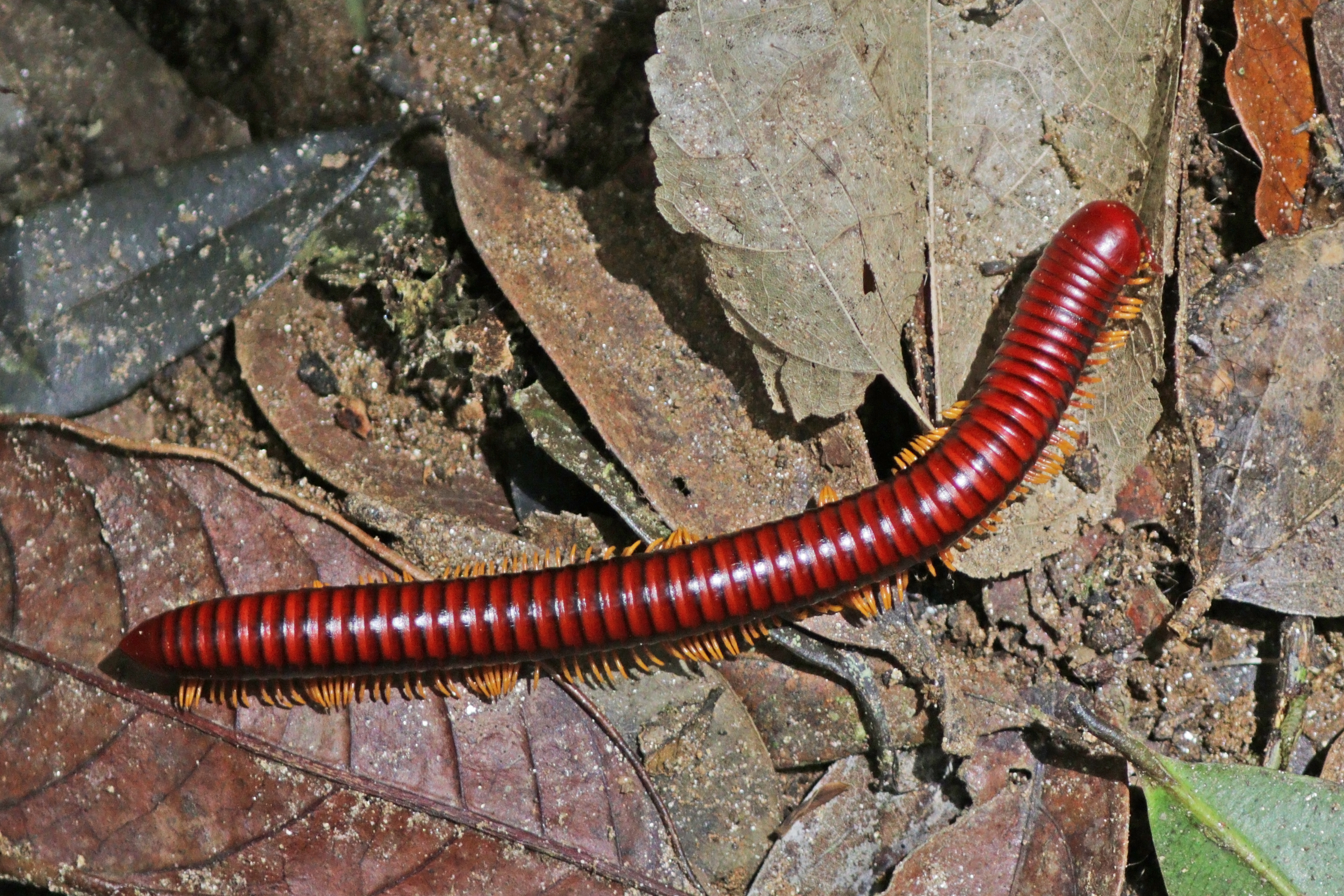
Giant fire millipede (Aphistogoniulus corallipes), Madagascar

Millipedes generally have little impact on human economic or social well-being, especially in comparison with insects, although locally they can be a nuisance or agricultural pest. Millipedes do not bite, and their defensive secretions are mostly harmless to humans, usually causing only minor discolouration on the skin, but the secretions of some tropical species may cause pain, itching, local erythema, edema, blisters, eczema, and occasionally cracked skin. Eye exposures to these secretions causes general irritation and potentially more severe effects such as conjunctivitis and keratitis. This is called millipede burn. First aid consists of flushing the area thoroughly with water; further treatment is aimed at relieving the local effects.

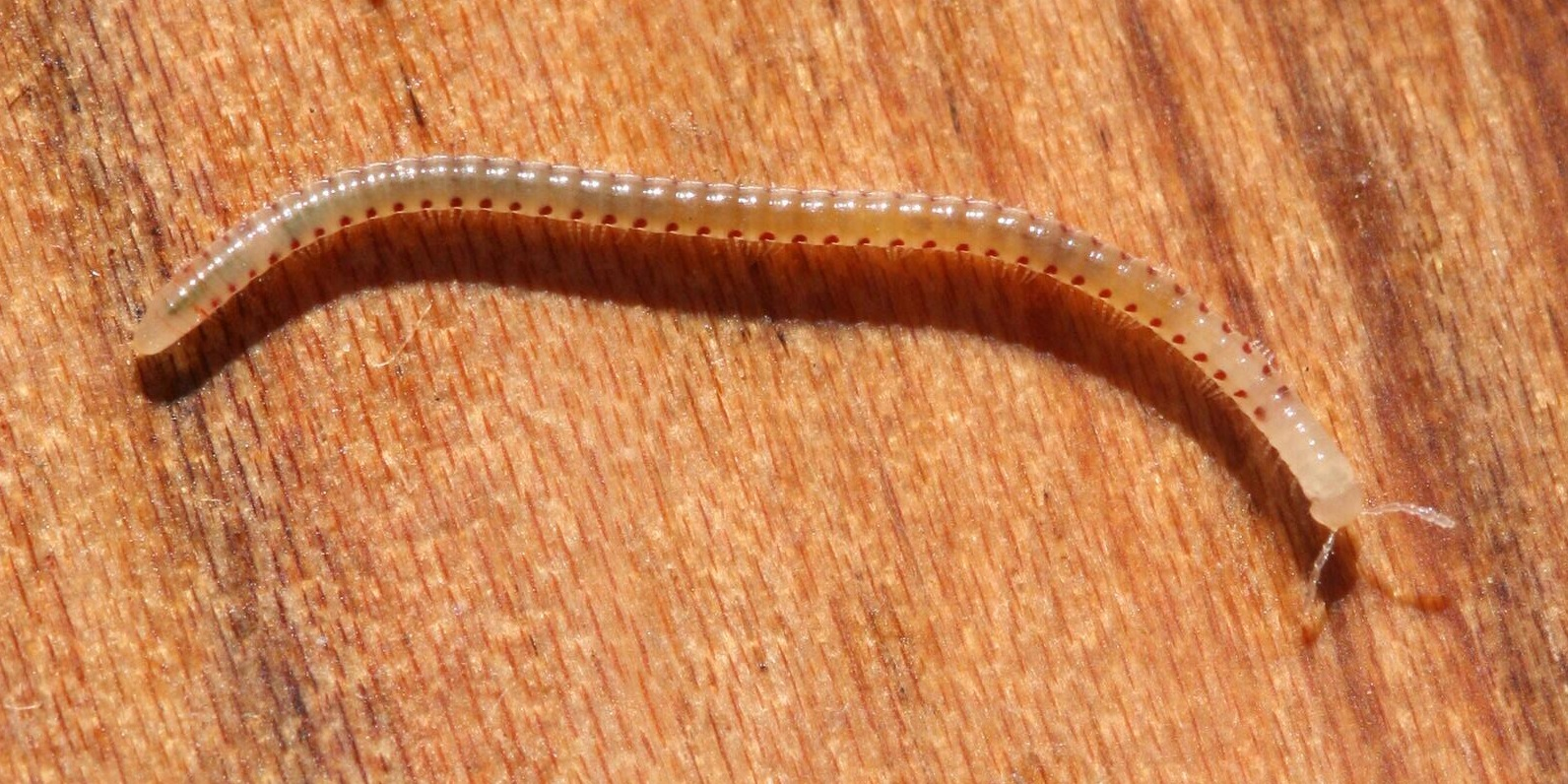
Spotted snake millipedes can be agricultural pests.

Some millipedes are considered household pests, including Xenobolus carnifex which can infest thatched roofs in India, and Ommatoiulus moreleti, which periodically invades homes in Australia. Other species exhibit periodical swarming behaviour, which can result in home invasions, crop damage, and train delays when the tracks become slippery with the crushed remains of hundreds of millipedes. Some millipedes can cause significant damage to crops: the spotted snake millipede (Blaniulus guttulatus) is a pest of sugar beets and other root crops, and as a result is one of the few millipedes with a common name.

Some of the larger millipedes in the orders Spirobolida, Spirostreptida, and Sphaerotheriida are popular as pets. Some species commonly sold or kept include species of Archispirostreptus, Aphistogoniulus, Narceus, and Orthoporus.

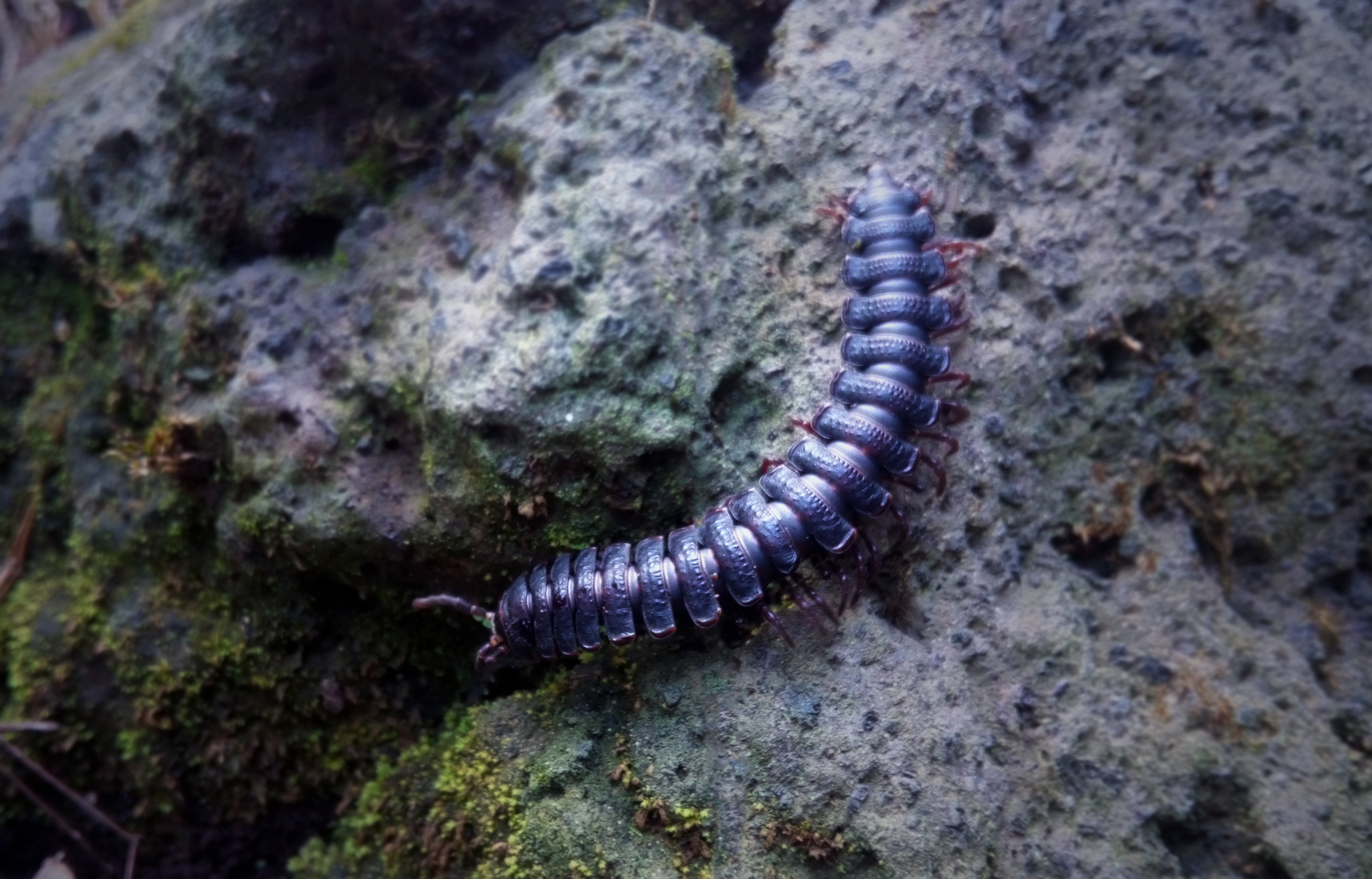
Flat millipede found in the Mount Cameroon Forest

Millipedes appear in folklore and traditional medicine around the world. Some cultures associate millipede activity with coming rains. In Zambia, smashed millipede pulp is used to treat wounds, and the Bafia people of Cameroon use millipede juice to treat earache. In certain Himalayan Bhotiya tribes, dry millipede smoke is used to treat haemorrhoids. Native people in Malaysia use millipede secretions in poison-tipped arrows. The secretions of Spirobolus bungii have been observed to inhibit division of human cancer cells. The only recorded usage of millipedes as food by humans comes from the Bobo people of Burkina Faso in West Africa, who consume boiled, dried millipedes belonging to the families Gomphodesmidae and Spirostreptidae, to which they add tomato sauce.

Millipedes have also inspired and played roles in scientific research. In 1963, a walking vehicle with 36 legs was designed, said to have been inspired by a study of millipede locomotion. Experimental robots have had the same inspiration, in particular when heavy loads are needed to be carried in tight areas involving turns and curves. In biology, some authors have advocated millipedes as model organisms for the study of arthropod physiology and the developmental processes controlling the number and shape of body segments.

Similar to vermicompost, millipedes can be used to convert plant matter (including Municipal solid waste) into compost in what has been named millicomposting, which improves the quality of the compost.
