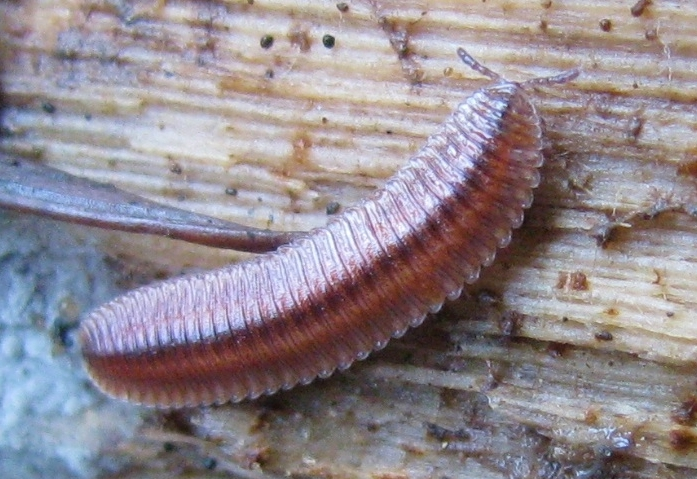
- Octoglena bivirgata from the western United States

Scientific classification
- Kingdom: Animalia
- Phylum: Arthropoda
- Subphylum: Myriapoda
- Class: Diplopoda
- Subclass: Chilognatha
- Infraclass: Helminthomorpha
- Subterclass: Colobognatha
- Order: Polyzoniida; Cook, 1895

Families
- Hirudisomatidae; Polyzoniidae; Siphonotidae; Siphonocryptidae

Synonyms
- Ommatophora Brandt, 1840; Orthozonia Verhoeff, 1840

= Polyzoniida =

Order of millipedes

Polyzoniida is an order of millipedes in the subterclass Colobognatha. This order contains three families and more than 70 described species. The species in this order are also known as camphor millipedes, because ozopore secretions in this order frequently have a strong camphor-like smell. Poison frogs in South America and Madagascar evidently obtain some of their poison from these millipedes.

== Description ==
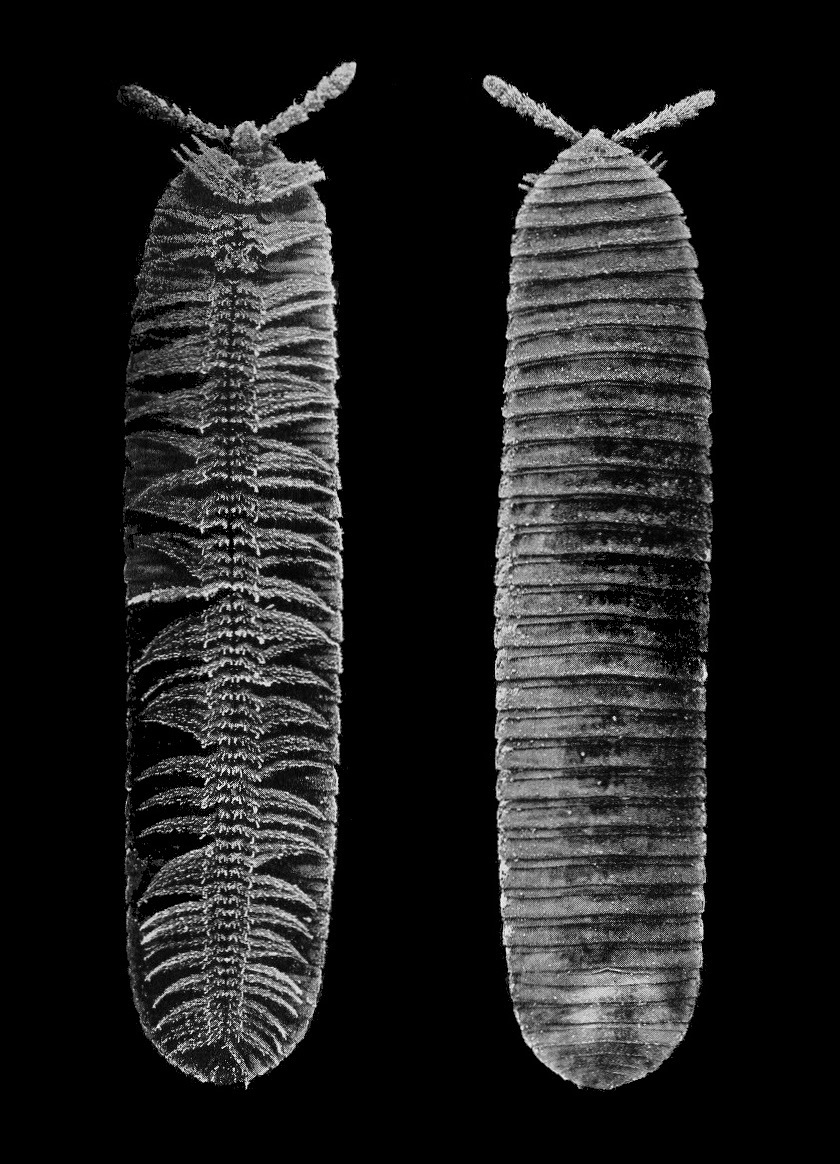
Male Bdellozonium cerviculatum from the western United States viewed from below and above

Millipedes in this order range from 4 mm to 50 mm in length but are usually 10 mm to 15 mm long. Polyzoniidans have a somewhat domed dorsal surface with a flat ventral side. Their heads are small and cone-like, with few ocelli. They lack a dorsal groove and paranota (lateral extensions of each segment). The antennae are relatively thick. These millipedes can have from 20 to 88 segments, with huge variation in segment number within the same species. The body is frequently yellowish or even pink, sometimes featuring characteristic black bands. Legs have six segments. In males, leg pairs 9 and 10 become leglike gonopods in adults. The posterior gonopods typically have from five to seven segments, but the number of segments in the anterior gonopods is more variable. Juveniles hatch with four leg pairs. Females in this order protect their eggs.

== Families ==
The order Polyzoniida contains three, possibly four, families:

Hirudisomatidae Silvestri, 1896 (6 genera, 20 species)
Polyzoniidae Newport, 1844 (6 genera, 22 species)
Siphonotidae Cook, 1895 (12 genera, 32 species)
Siphonocryptidae Pocock, 1894 (2 genera, 7 species)

== Distribution ==
This order is distributed worldwide, but in Africa is found only in South Africa and Madagascar. The family Hirudisomatidae occurs from Spain to the Himalayas in Eurasia, Japan, and in North America from southwest Canada to central Mexico. The family Polyzoniidae has a holarctic (northern hemisphere) distribution, occurring in the northwest and northeast United States, eastern Canada, and in Europe from the United Kingdom and France to Siberia. Siphonotidae has a southern distribution, occurring in Brazil and Chile, South Africa, Southeast Asia, Indonesia, Tasmania, and New Zealand.
