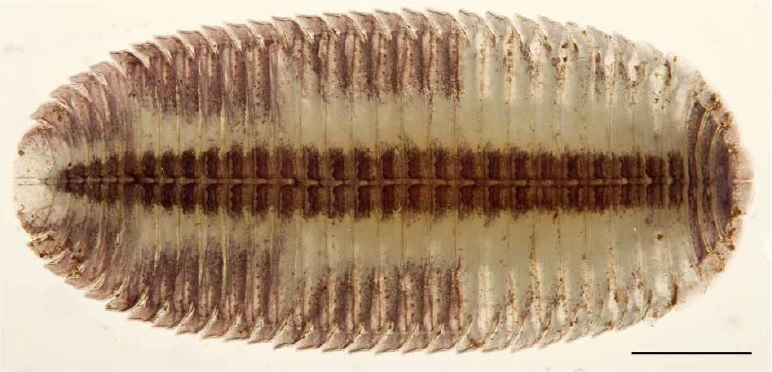
- Siphonocryptus zigzag

Scientific classification
- Kingdom: Animalia
- Phylum: Arthropoda
- Subphylum: Myriapoda
- Class: Diplopoda
- Subclass: Chilognatha
- Infraclass: Helminthomorpha
- Subterclass: Colobognatha
- Order: Siphonocryptida; Cook, 1895
- Family: Siphonocryptidae; Pocock, 1894

Genera
- Hirudicryptus; Siphonocryptus

Synonyms
- Siphonocryptini

= Siphonocryptida =

Order of millipedes

Siphonocryptida is an order of millipedes, comprising the sole family Siphonocryptidae. With only seven described species, the Siphonocryptida is the second smallest millipede order, surpassed only by Siphoniulida, with two species. A 2026 paper found the order to be nested inside Polyzoniida.

== Classification ==
- Hirudicryptus Enghoff & Golovatch, 1995
  - Hirudicryptus canariensis (Loksa, 1967) - Canary Islands
  - Hirudicryptus taiwanensis Korsós et al., 2008 - Taiwan
  - Hirudicryptus quintumelementum Korsós et al., 2009 - Nepal
  - Hirudicryptus abchasicus Golovatch, Evsyukov & Reip, 2015 - NW Caucasus
- Siphonocryptus Pocock, 1894
  - Siphonocryptus compactus Pocock, 1894 - Sumatra
  - Siphonocryptus latior Enghoff & Golovatch, 1995 - Peninsular Malaysia
  - Siphonocryptus zigzag Enghoff, 2010 - Pahang
