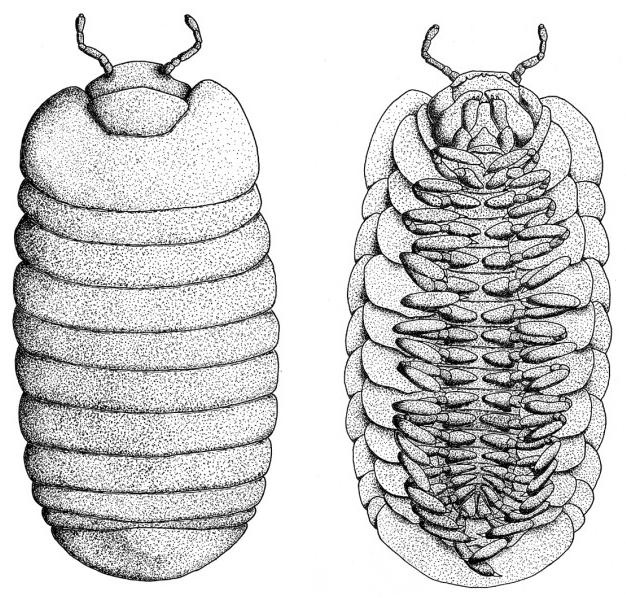
- Glomeris marginata, female

Scientific classification
- Kingdom: Animalia
- Phylum: Arthropoda
- Subphylum: Myriapoda
- Class: Diplopoda
- Subclass: Chilognatha
- Infraclass: Pentazonia; Brandt, 1833

Superorders
- Limacomorpha; Oniscomorpha

Synonyms
- Opisthandria Verhoeff, 1894

= Pentazonia =

Infraclass of millipedes

Pentazonia is a taxonomic infraclass of millipedes containing the pill-millipedes (Oniscomorpha) which can roll into a ball and the order Glomeridesmida which cannot. Defining traits (apomorphies) include divided sternites, a labrum with single median tooth, and an enlarged pygidium on the hind-most body segment. Pentazonia is in the dominant millipede subclass Chilognatha which have a calcified exoskeleton and modified sperm-transferring legs in males. In contrast to the Helminthomorpha – the other Chilognathan infraclass, the sperm-transferring legs are located on posterior body segments and known as telopods. Pentazonians are relatively short-bodied, with between 13 and 21 body segments. The Pentazonia contains one extinct order, Amynilyspedida, often referred to the Oniscomorpha.
