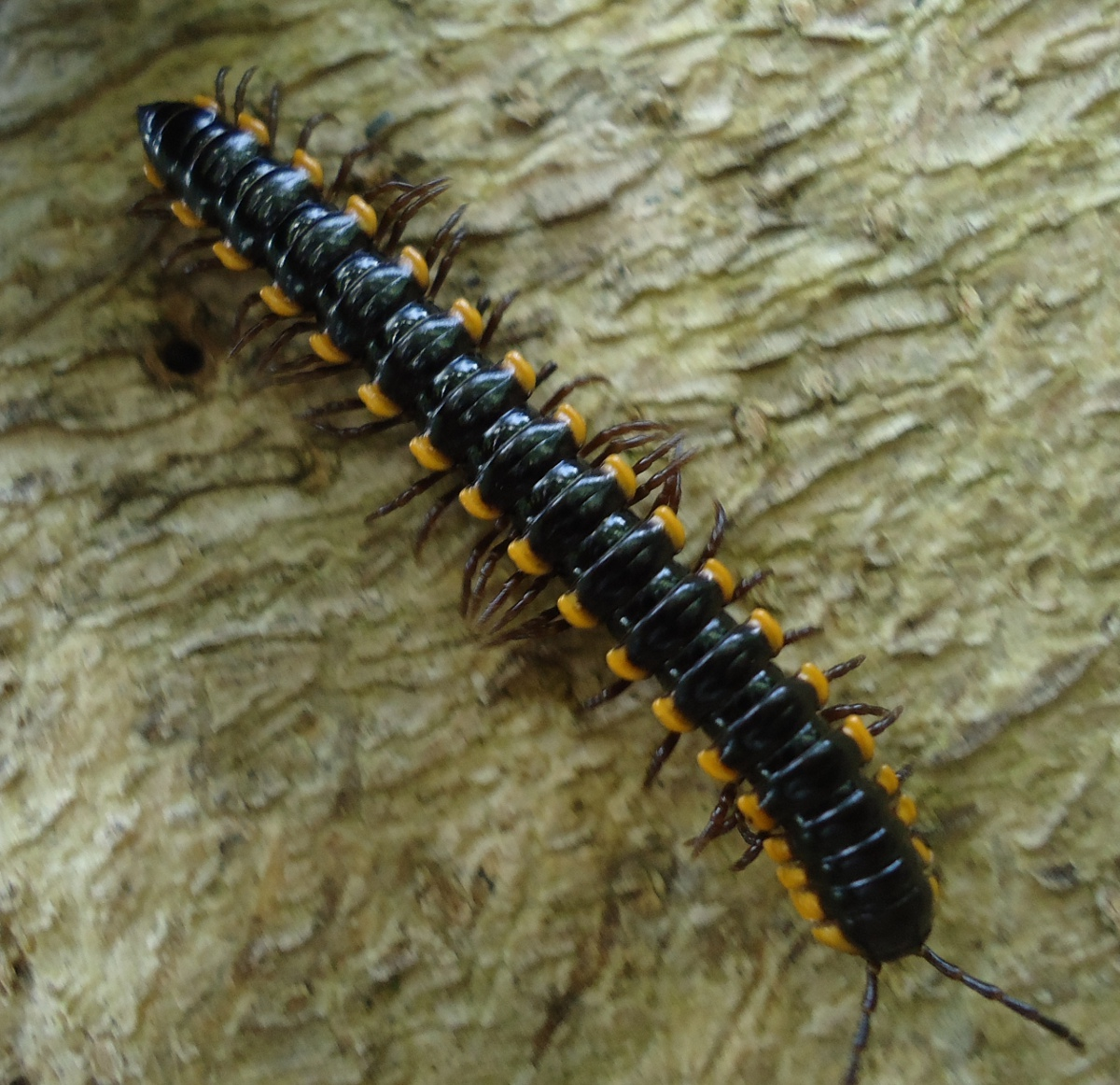
- Orthomorpha coarctata

Scientific classification
- Kingdom: Animalia
- Phylum: Arthropoda
- Subphylum: Myriapoda
- Class: Diplopoda
- Subclass: Chilognatha
- Infraclass: Helminthomorpha; Pocock, 1887

= Helminthomorpha =

Infraclass of worm-like millipedes

Helminthomorpha is an infraclass of worm-like millipedes within the class Diplopoda.
