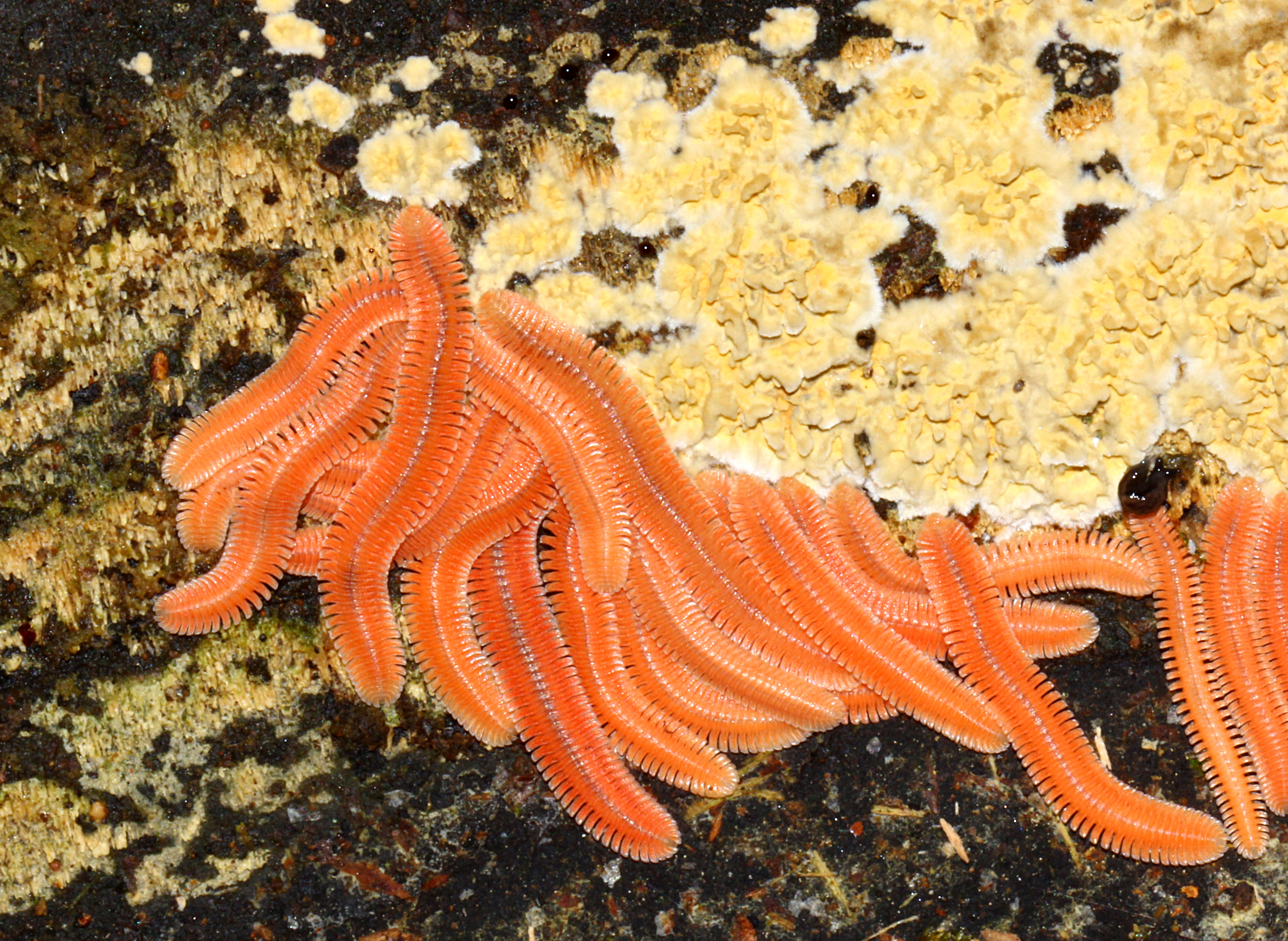
- Feeding on Xylodon fungi, California
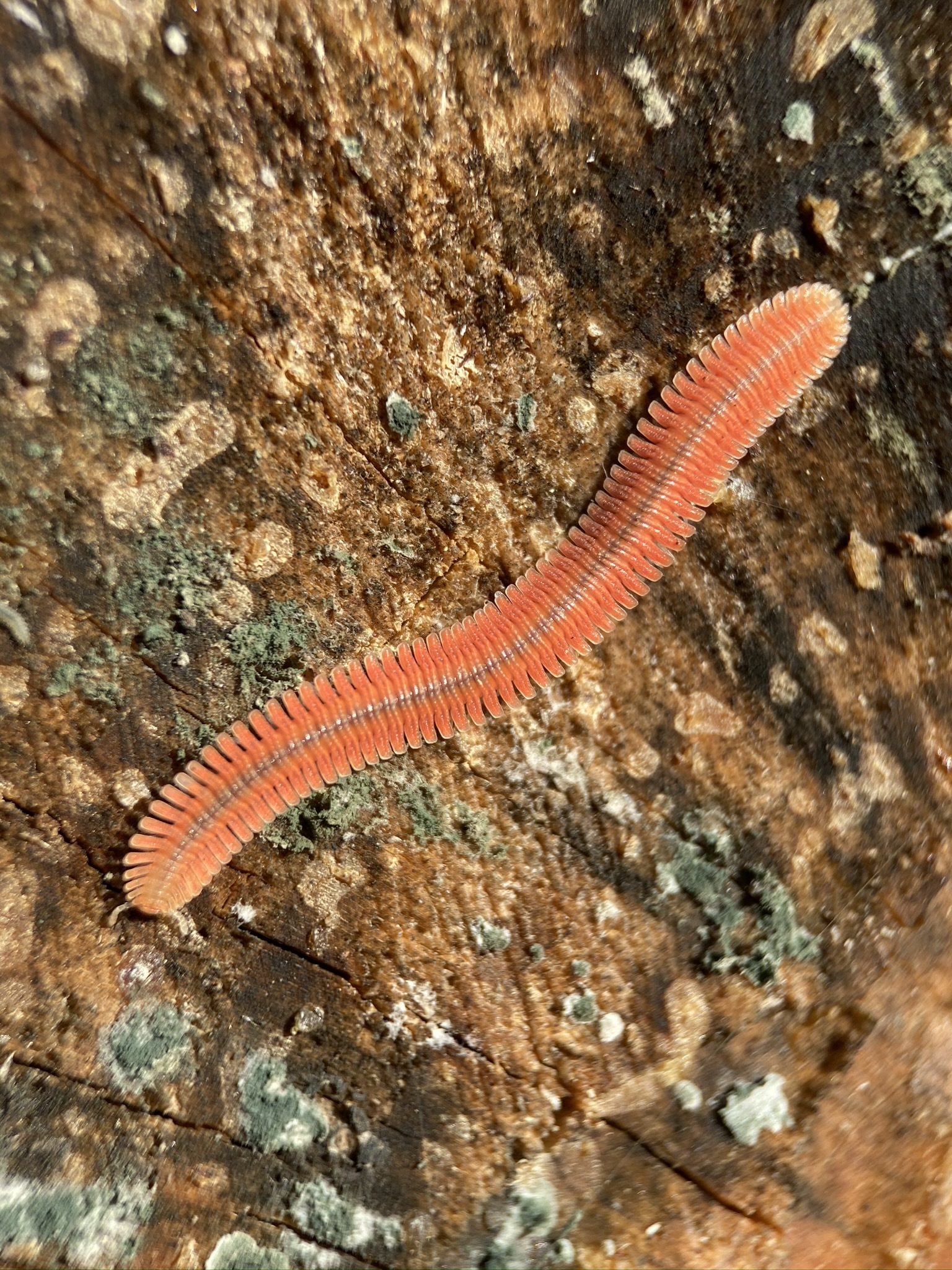
- In California

Scientific classification
- Domain: Eukaryota
- Kingdom: Animalia
- Phylum: Arthropoda
- Subphylum: Myriapoda
- Class: Diplopoda
- Order: Platydesmida
- Family: Andrognathidae
- Genus: Brachycybe
- Species: B. rosea

Binomial name
- Brachycybe rosea Murray, 1877

= Brachycybe rosea =

Species of millipede

Brachycybe rosea is a species of millipede in the family Andrognathidae. It is found in North America.
