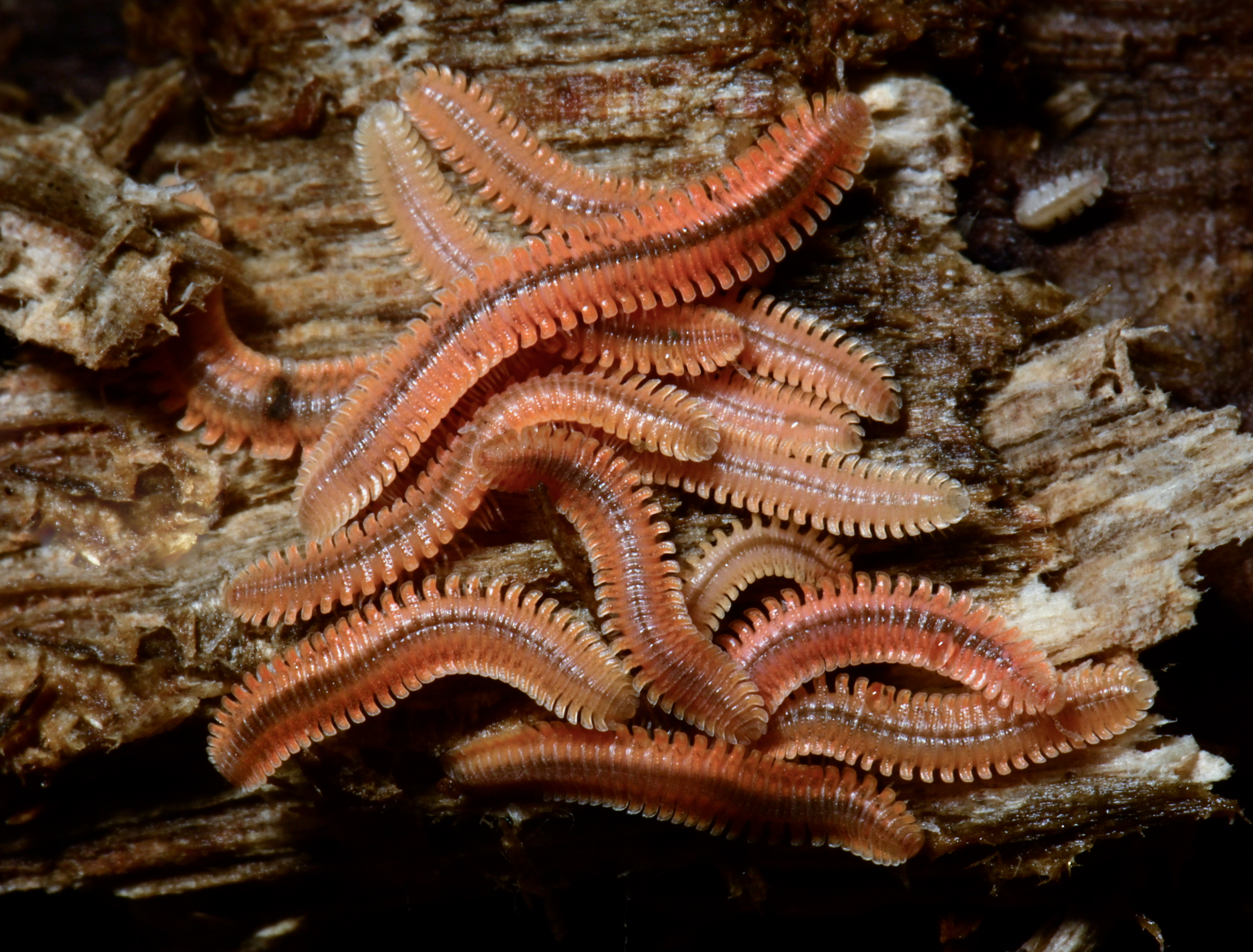

Scientific classification
- Domain: Eukaryota
- Kingdom: Animalia
- Phylum: Arthropoda
- Subphylum: Myriapoda
- Class: Diplopoda
- Order: Platydesmida
- Family: Andrognathidae
- Genus: Brachycybe
- Species: B. producta

Binomial name
- Brachycybe producta Loomis, 1936

= Brachycybe producta =

Species of millipede

Brachycybe producta is a species of millipede in the family Andrognathidae. It is found in North America.

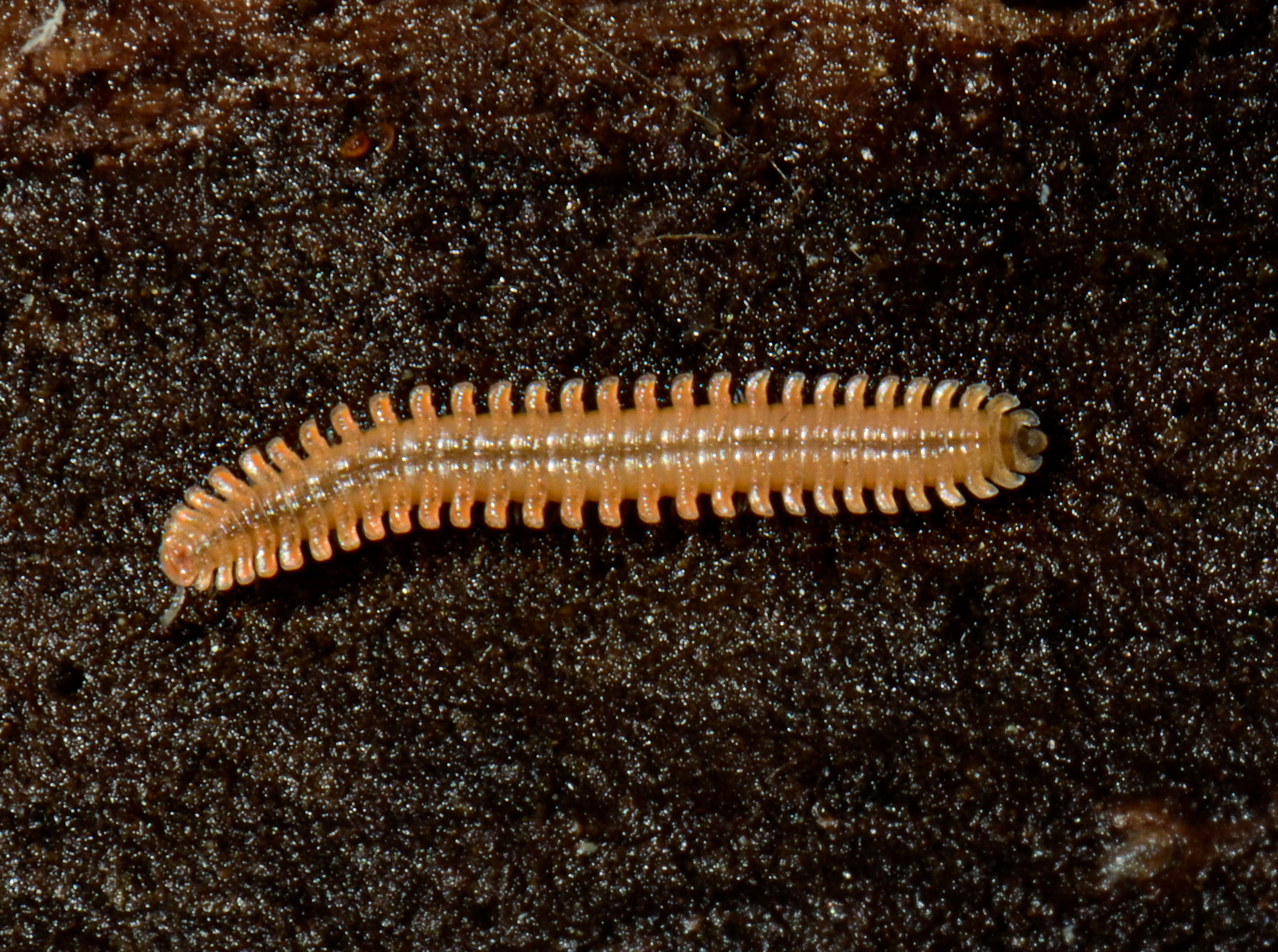
Brachycybe producta
