= Brachycybe petasata =

Scientific classification
- Kingdom: Animalia
- Phylum: Arthropoda
- Subphylum: Myriapoda
- Class: Diplopoda
- Order: Platydesmida
- Family: Andrognathidae
- Genus: Brachycybe
- Species: B. petasata

Binomial name
- Brachycybe petasata Loomis, 1936

Species of millipede

Brachycybe petasata is a species of millipede in the family Andrognathidae. It is found in North America.
