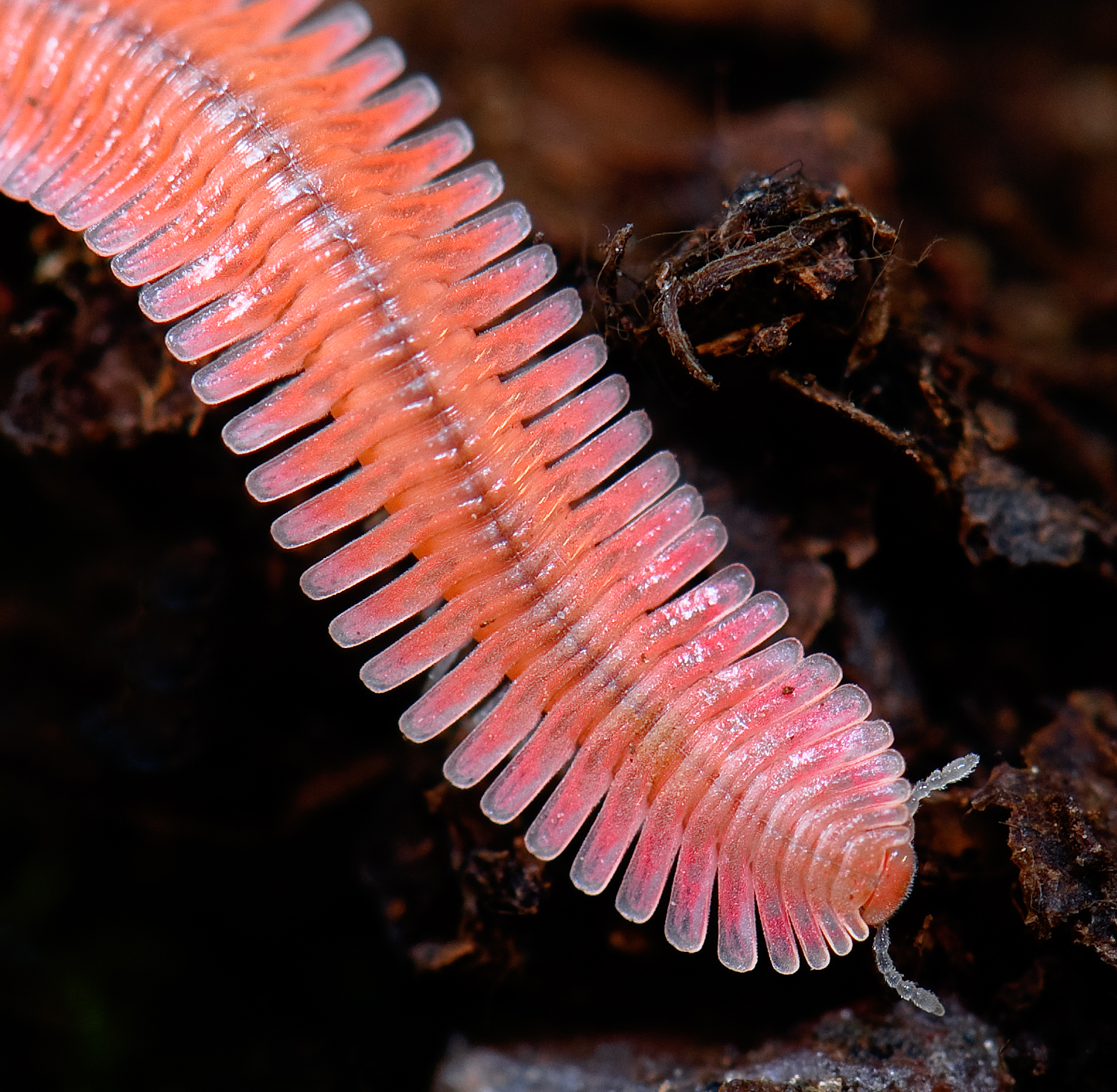
- Brachycybe lecontii

Scientific classification
- Kingdom: Animalia
- Phylum: Arthropoda
- Subphylum: Myriapoda
- Class: Diplopoda
- Order: Platydesmida
- Family: Andrognathidae
- Genus: Brachycybe; Wood, 1864

Type species
- Brachycybe lecontii Wood, 1864

Species
- B. cooki (Loomis, 1942); B. disticha Mikhaljova, 2010; B. lecontii Wood, 1864; B. nodulosa (Verhoeff, 1935); B. petasata Loomis, 1936; B. picta Gardner, 1975; B. producta Loomis, 1936; B. rosea Murray, 1877

Synonyms
- Bazillozonium Verhoeff, 1935 Sinocybe Loomis, 1942

= Brachycybe =

Genus of millipedes

Brachycybe (Greek for "short head") is a genus of social millipedes with species in the United States and East Asia. Species in this genus are often referred to as "feather millipedes" due to their shape.

In a rare example of paternal care in invertebrates, males of most species guard the eggs until they hatch.

== Description ==
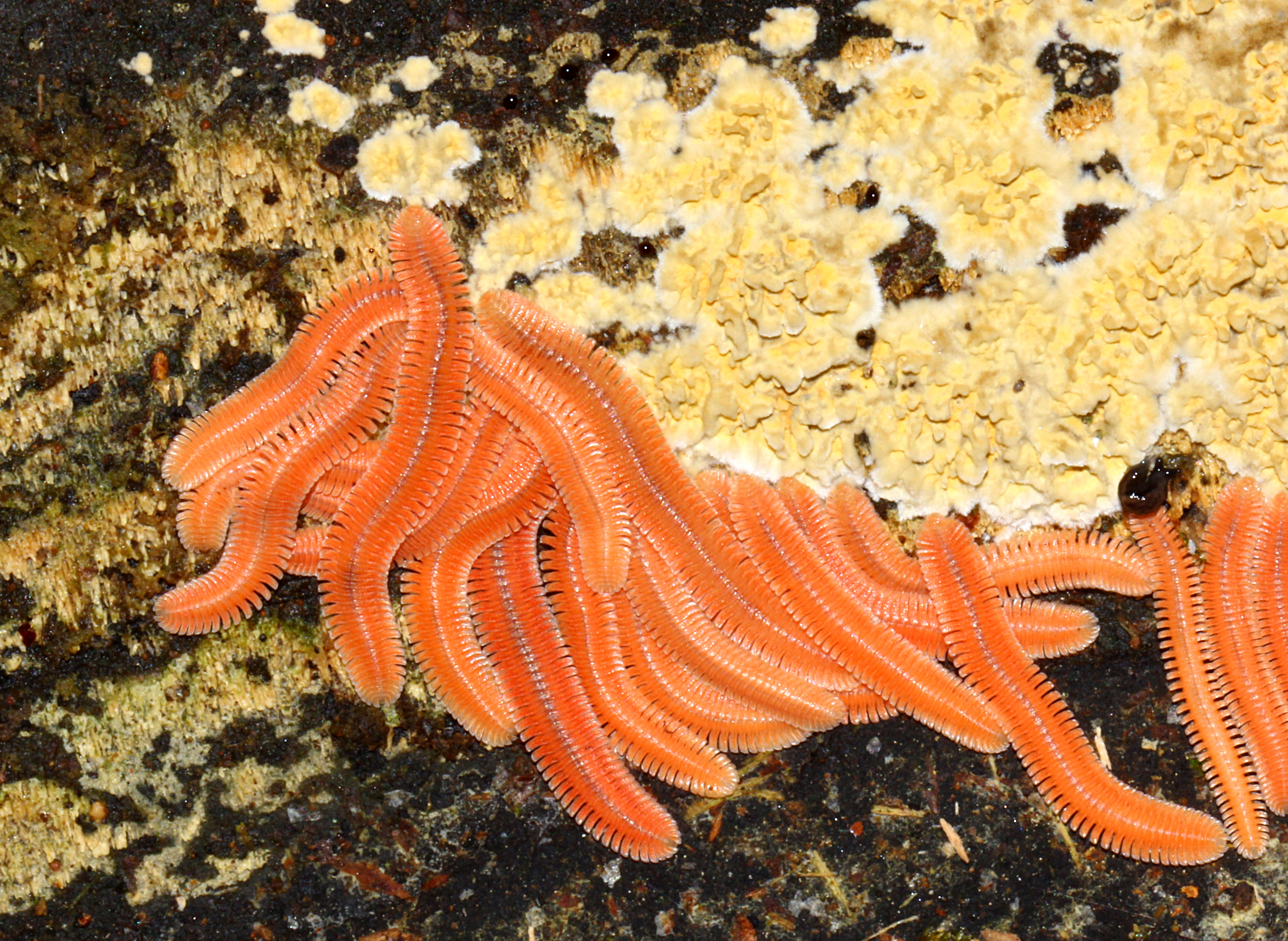
B. rosea colony feeding on Xylodon fungi.

All species in the genus lack eyes. Individuals attain lengths up to 1 inch (25 mm) and range in color from orange to tan to pink. B. picta is uniquely patterned with 5 brown spots.

Brachycybe species are rather similar in appearance, varying in subtle features of the collum (first body segment) and paranota (lateral “keels” extending off of body segments).

The 9th and 10th pair of legs in mature males are modified into gonopods (reproductive appendages), and although gonopods are widely used to determine species in millipedes, the relatively simple gonopods of Brachycbe and other members of the Platydesmida show little variation and are not readily useful for species identification.

== Diet ==
While most millipedes feed on leaf litter or other plant matter, Brachycybe are thought to feed primarily on fungus, and may be found under rotting logs or stumps. They feed on a large variety of fungal orders.

== Behaviour ==
=== Parental care ===
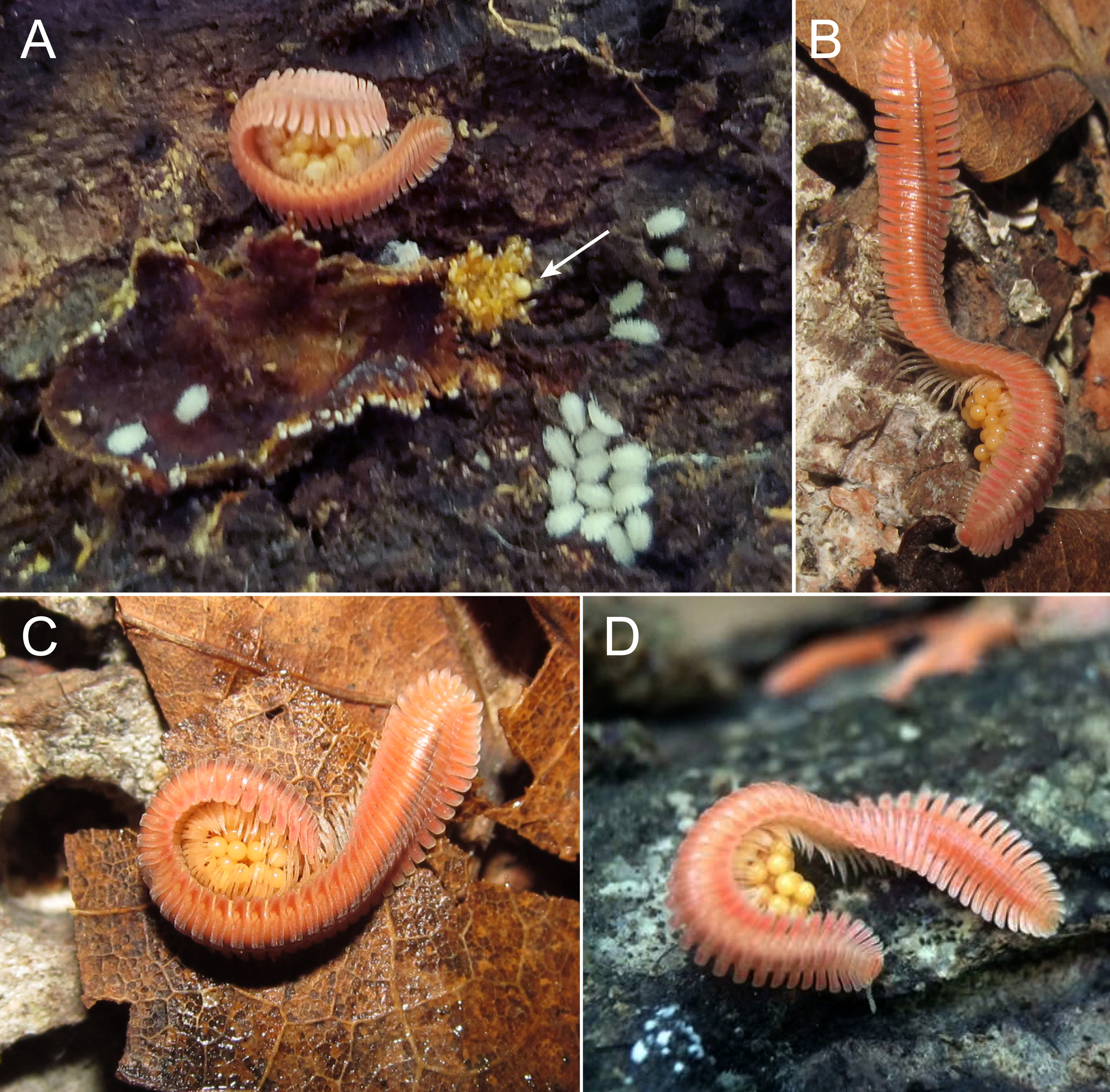
B. lecontii with eggs

Male egg brooding (care of eggs) has been extensively studied in B. nodulosa, a species found in Japan and South Korea. After the female lays eggs, the male coils his body around the mass, and guards them until hatching, a behaviour thought to protect the eggs from soil-dwelling fungi or predators such as ants.

"Pinwheeling" behaviour

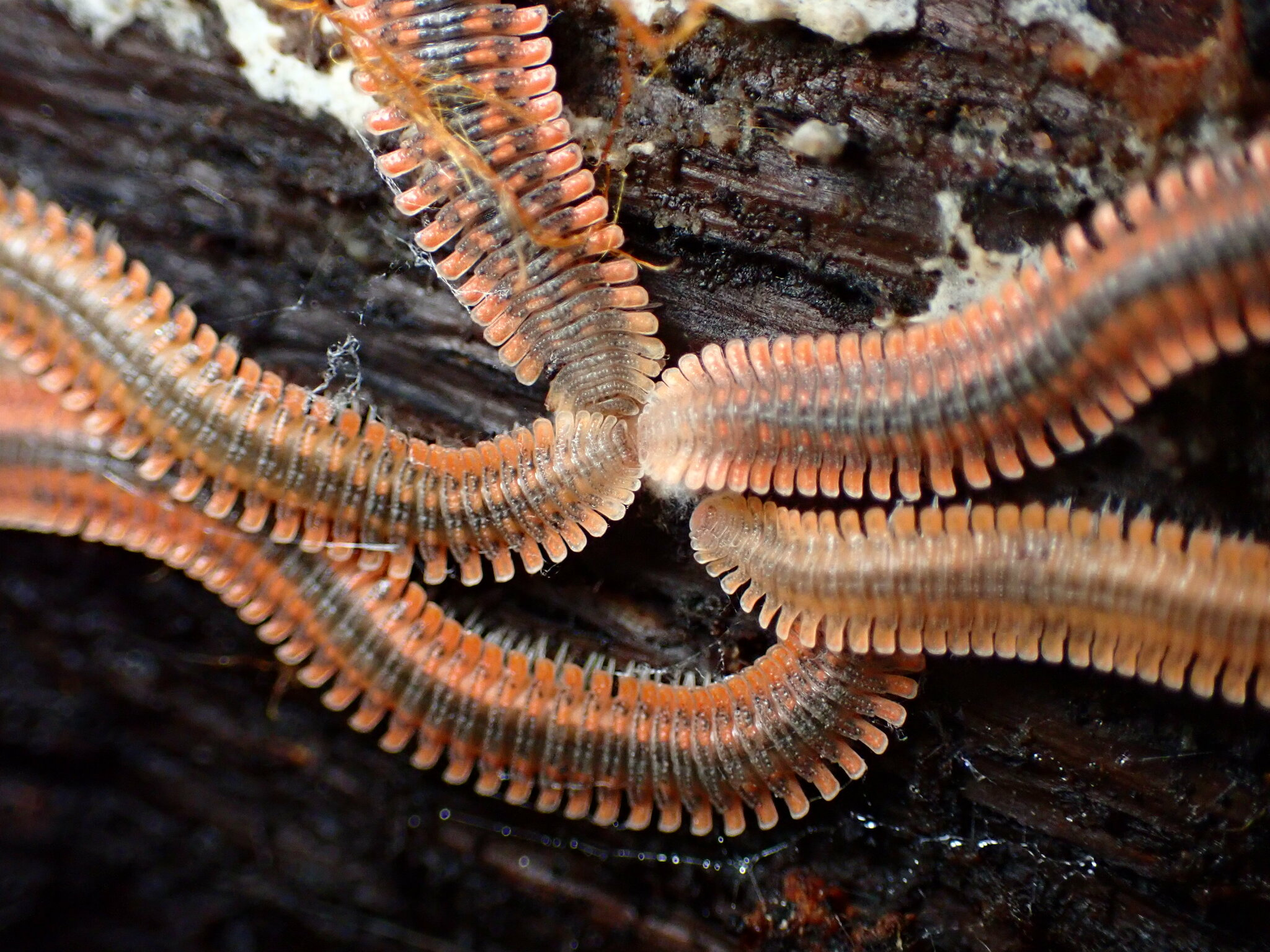
Brachycybe producta

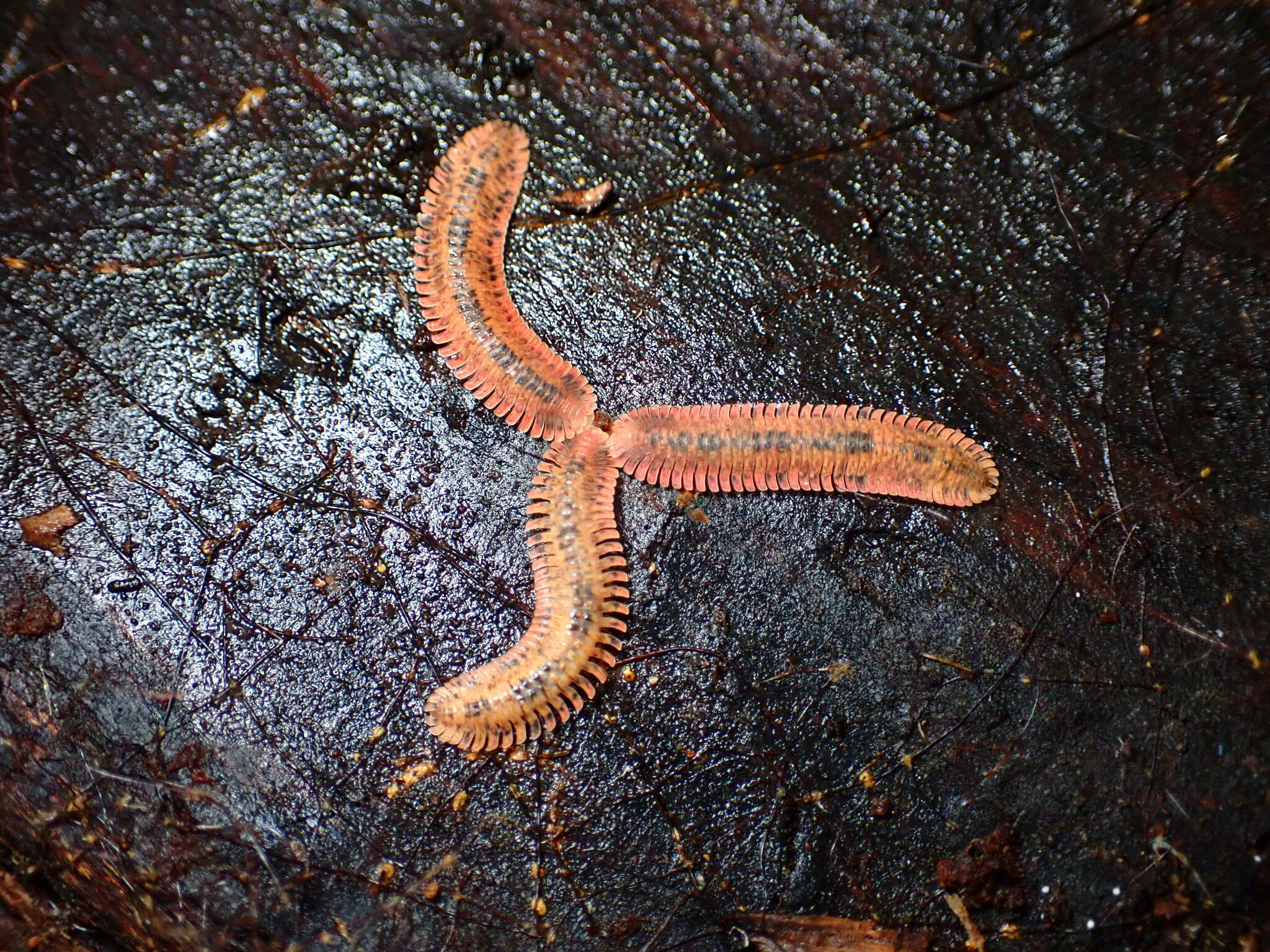
Brachycybe picta

Paternal care has also been studied in B. lecontii, showing that although parental care may last through the 3-4 week incubation period, this does not extend to juveniles they have hatched. It appears that the survival of eggs is completely dependent on the presence of paternal care, as all eggs become unviable after being separated from the brooding male, perhaps because the brooding male is needed to clean the eggs and ward of fungal infections. Males will seek out and collect eggs if they have been separated from their clutch. Similarly, males will collect the eggs of other males if they have been abandoned, adding them to their own clutch.

=== Sociality ===
Brachycybe are social millipede that form colonies. Sociality is uncommon amongst millipedes; outside of this genus, social behaviour has evolved in only a few other groups.

Brachycybe species are known to form "pinwheel" shaped groups of individuals, where the millipedes form a circle, their heads pointing inwards and their bodies pointing outwards. Females are more likely to form such "pinwheels". The precise purpose of this "pinwheeling" behaviour is uncertain, but it is known to be a feeding behaviour, seen when feeding on fungi.

== Species ==
Dorsal views of North American Brachycybe head and anterior segments. Upper row: B. petasata and B. lecontii. Lower row: B. rosea and B. producta, also showing mid body segments.

At least ten species have been named, and at least two undescribed species have been identified by genetic analysis. Studies of genetic differences suggest the genus originated in California around 50 million years ago.

Species list based on Shelley et al. (2005)

- B. cooki (Loomis, 1942) – Jiangxi Province, China
- B. disticha Mikhaljova, Golovatch, Korsós, Chen & Chang, 2010 – Taiwan
- B. lecontii Wood, 1864 – Southeastern United States, from Virginia to Illinois and Kansas, south to Louisiana and southern Alabama.
- B. nodulosa (Verhoeff, 1935) – Central and Southern Japan, southern South Korea.
- B. petasata Loomis, 1936 – Southern Appalachians: in adjacent parts of North Carolina, Georgia, Alabama, and Tennessee.
- B. picta Gardner, 1975 – Northern California: Marin County and Mendocino County.
- B. producta Loomis, 1936 – Northern California
- B. rosea Murray, 1877 – Northern California
