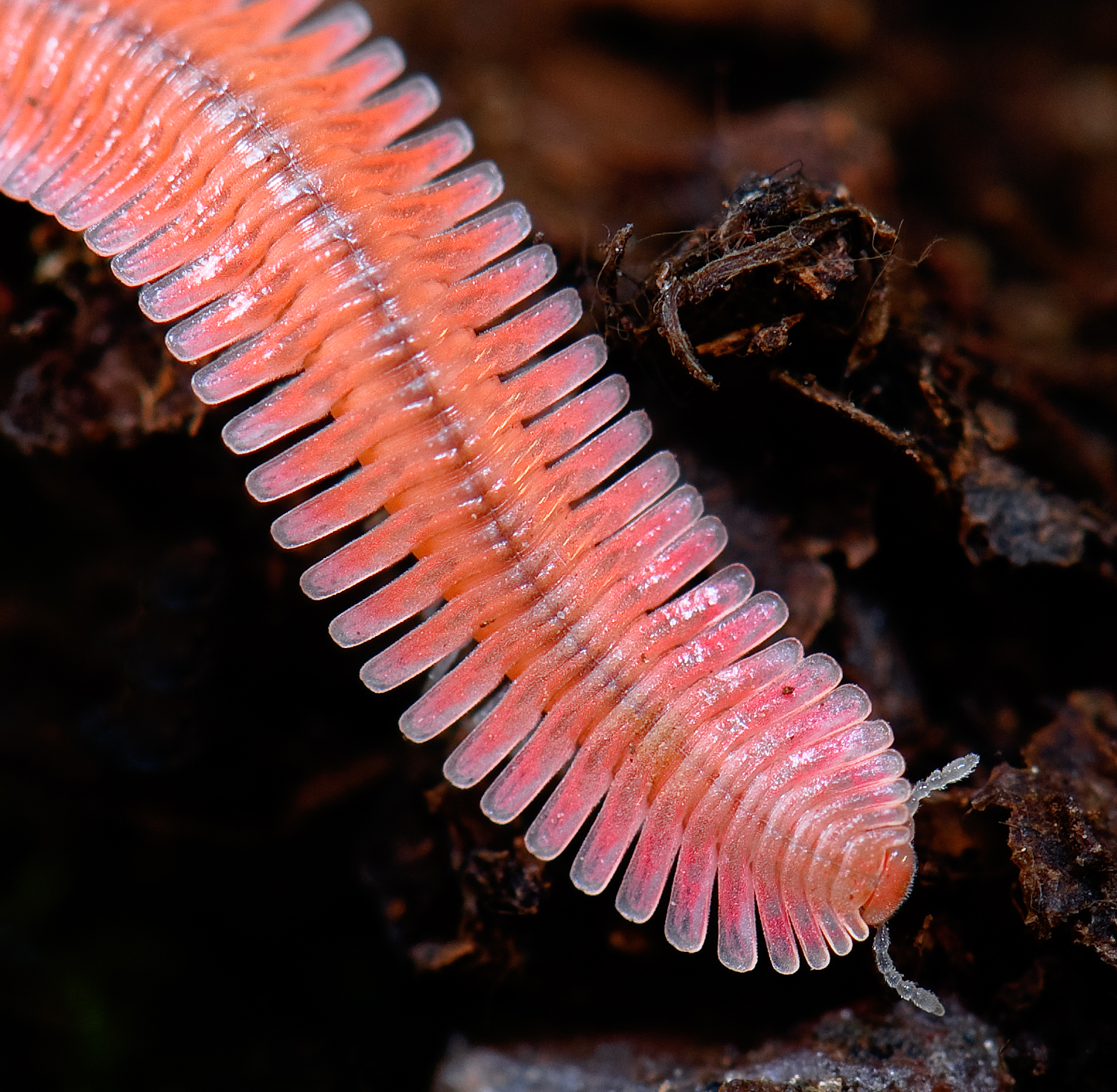

Scientific classification
- Kingdom: Animalia
- Phylum: Arthropoda
- Subphylum: Myriapoda
- Class: Diplopoda
- Order: Platydesmida
- Family: Andrognathidae
- Genus: Brachycybe
- Species: B. lecontii

Binomial name
- Brachycybe lecontii Wood, 1864

= Brachycybe lecontii =

Species of millipede

Brachycybe lecontii is a species of millipede in the family Andrognathidae. It is found in the eastern United States. Like others in the genus, this species is often referred to as feather millipedes.

== Description ==
Like others in the genus, this species has no eyes. It is pink in colour, although the shade of pink varies geographically.

== Diet ==
It is fungivorous, feeding on fungi from a large variety of fungal orders.

== Behaviour ==
=== Sociality ===
Like other Brachycybe species, this species is a social millipede that forms colonies. Sociality is uncommon amongst millipedes; outside this genus, social behaviour has evolved in only a few other groups.

Brachycybe species are known to create "pinwheel" shaped groups of individuals, where the millipedes form a circle, their heads pointing inwards and their bodies pointing outwards. Females are more likely to comprise such "pinwheels". The precise purpose of this "pinwheeling" behaviour is uncertain, but it is known to be a feeding behaviour, seen when feeding on fungi.

=== Paternal care ===
B. lecontii shows paternal care of eggs throughout their incubation, which may last 3–4 weeks. This parental care does not extend to young after hatching. It appears that the survival of eggs is completely dependent on the presence of paternal care, as all eggs become unviable after being separated from the brooding male. Perhaps because the brooding male is needed to clean the eggs and ward of fungal infections. Males will seek out and collect eggs if they have been separated from their clutch. Similarly, males will collect the eggs of other males if they have been abandoned, adding them to their own clutch.

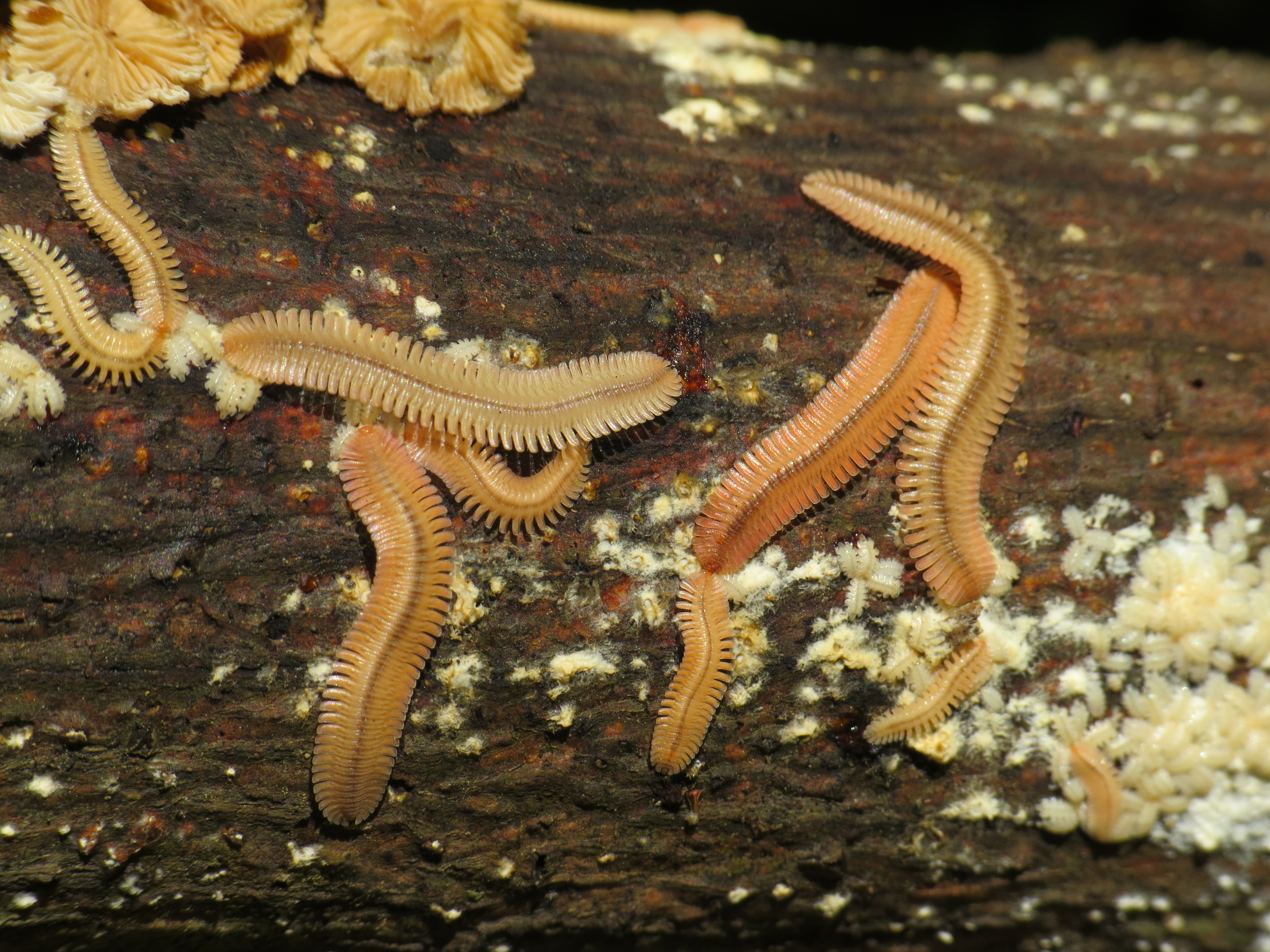
A colony, including adults with hatchlings

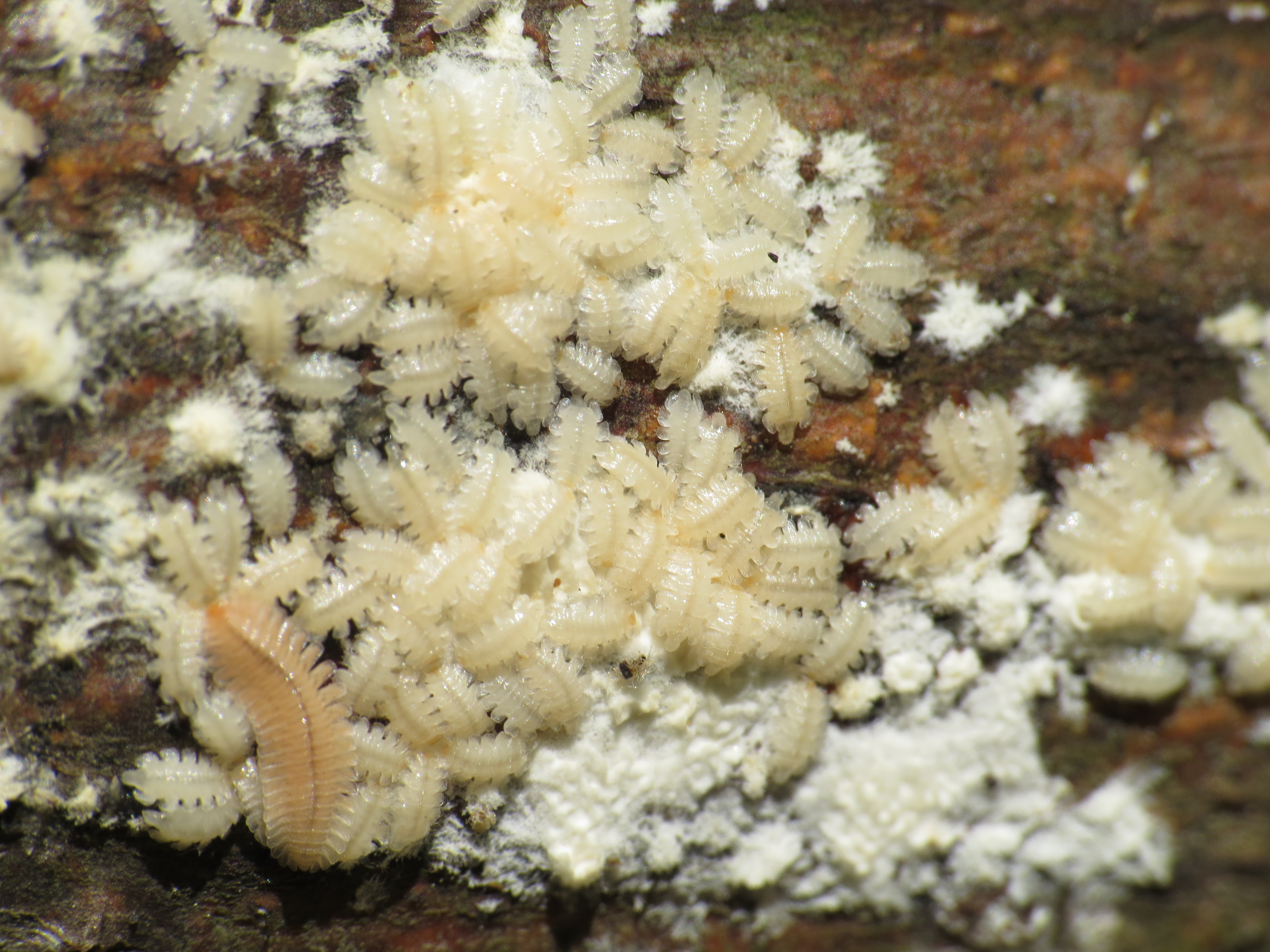
Hatchlings

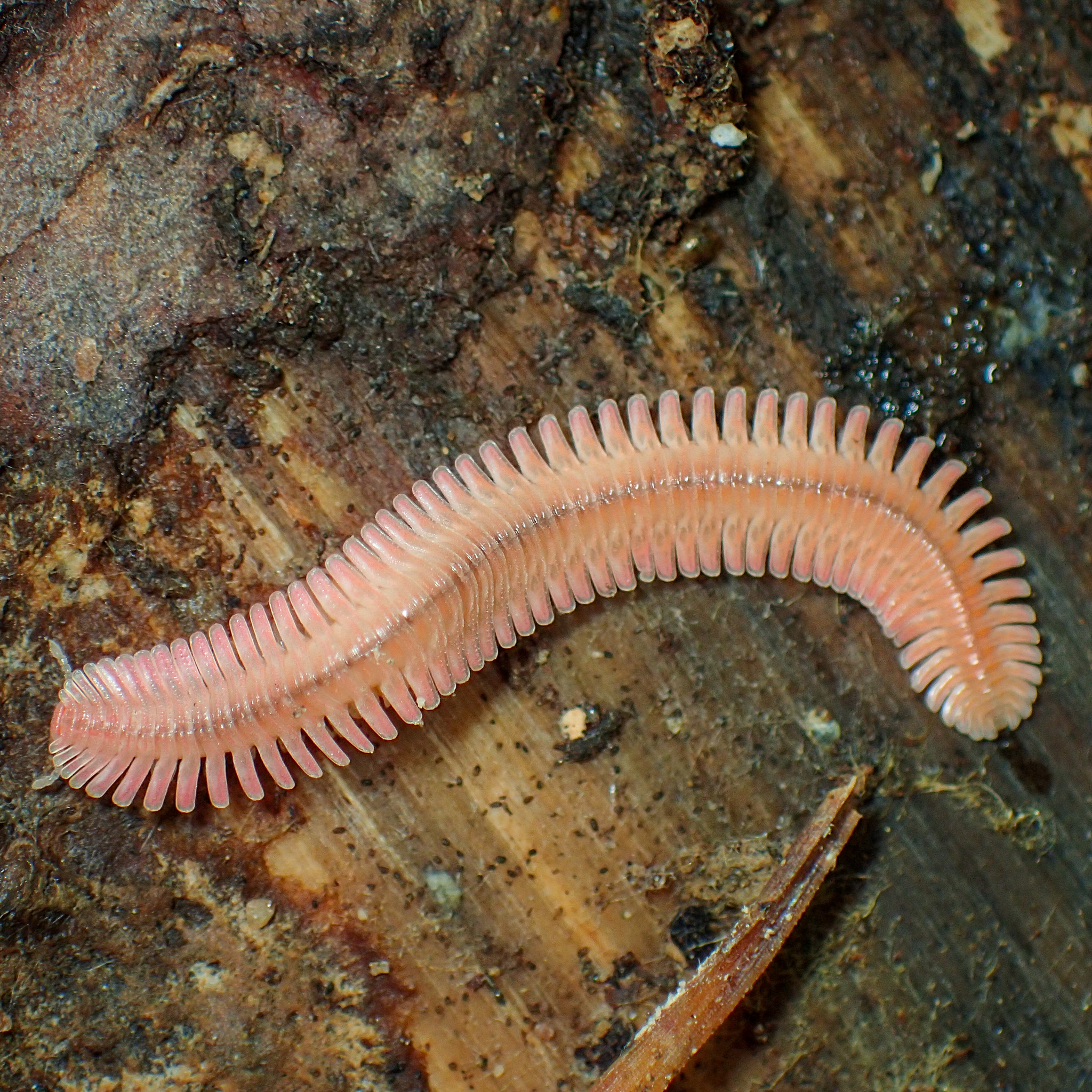
Adult Brachycybe Iecontii

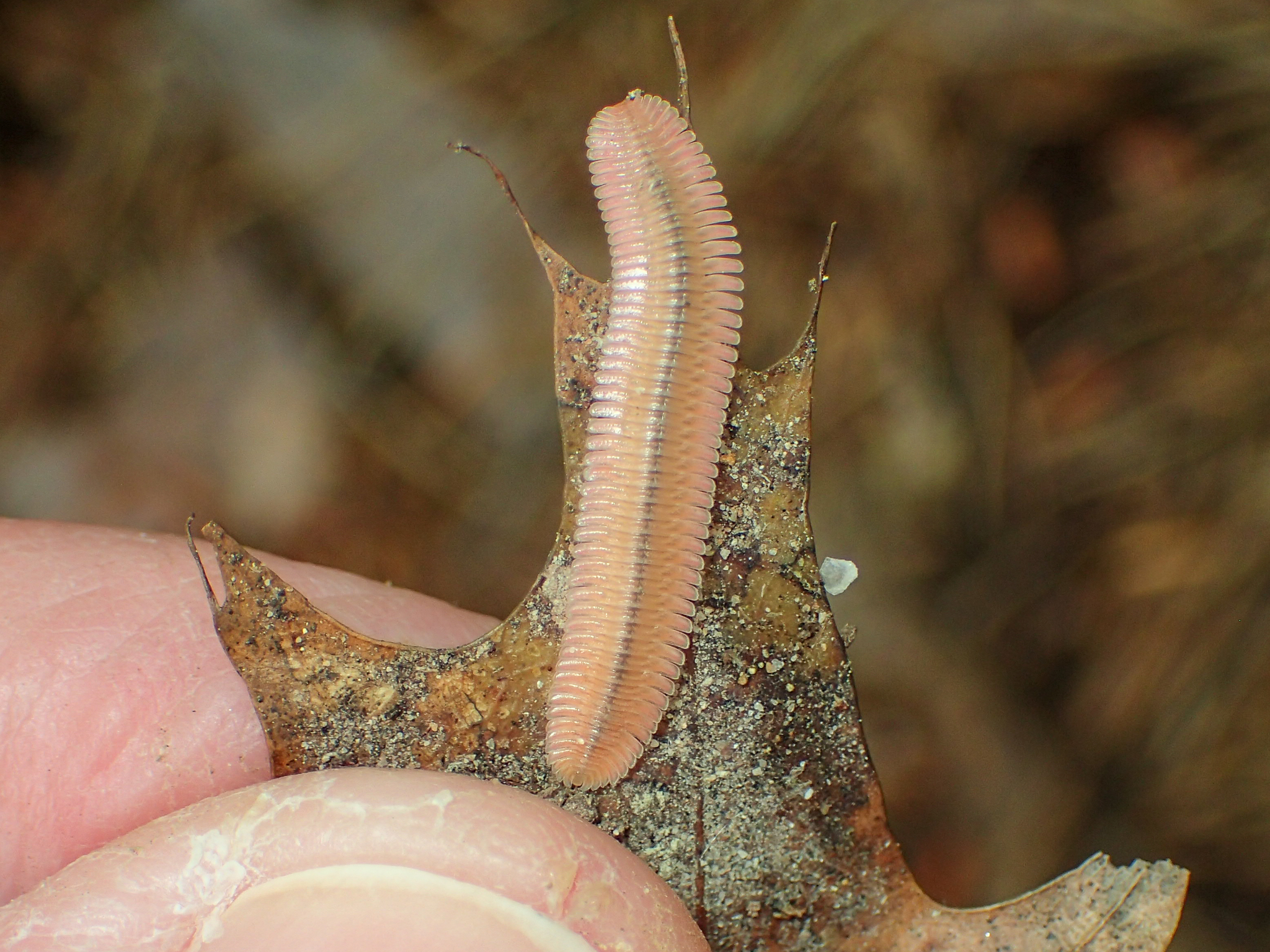
Adult sizes can vary from 3 mm to 5 cm

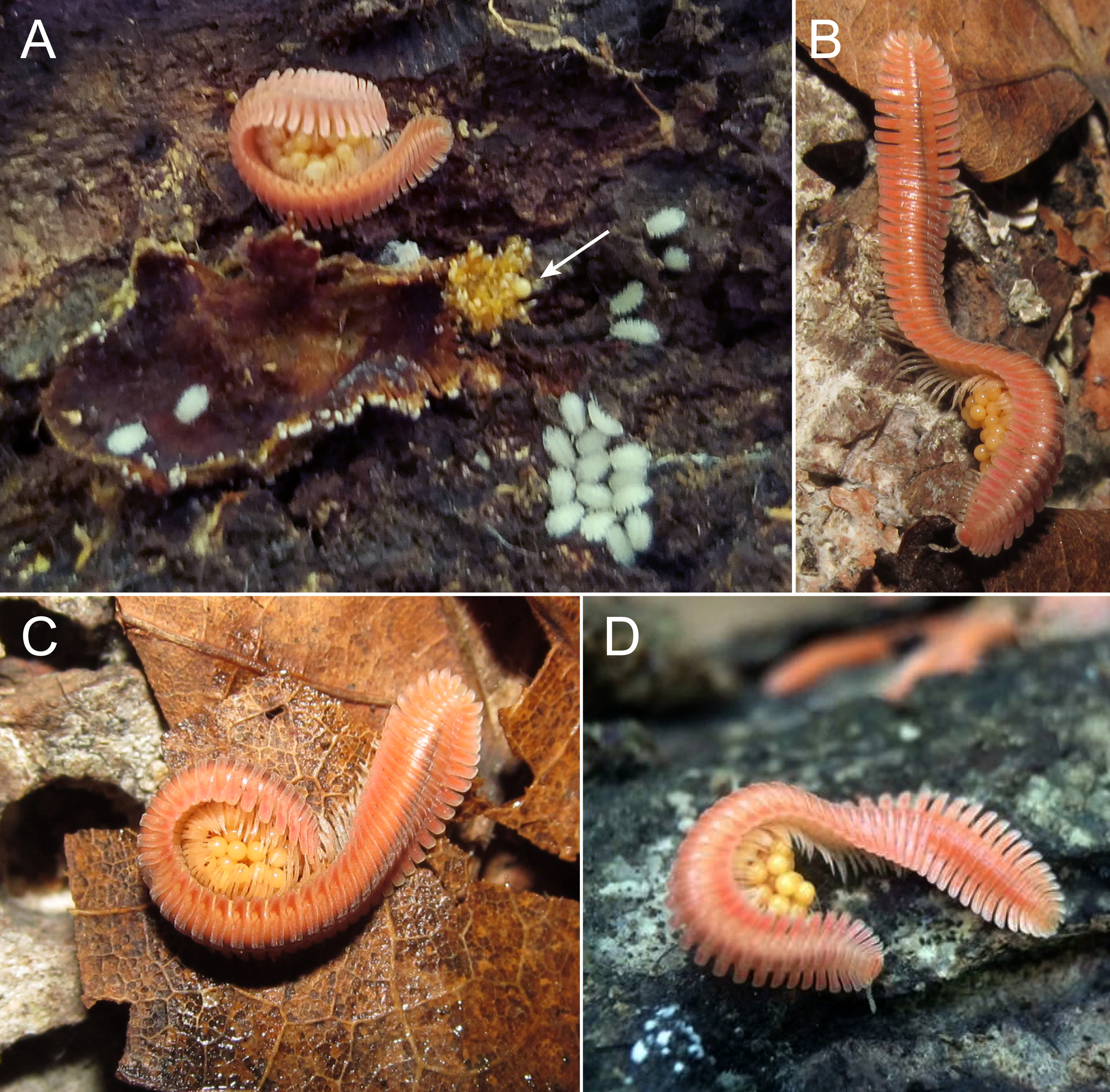
Paternal care of eggs
