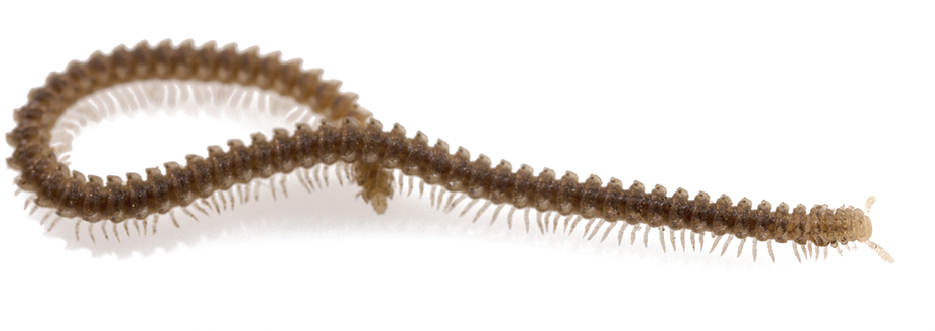
- Andrognathus corticarius

Scientific classification
- Domain: Eukaryota
- Kingdom: Animalia
- Phylum: Arthropoda
- Subphylum: Myriapoda
- Class: Diplopoda
- Order: Platydesmida
- Family: Andrognathidae
- Genus: Andrognathus; Cope, 1869

= Andrognathus =

Andrognathus Temporal range: Cenomanian–Recent

Genus of millipedes

Andrognathus is a genus of North American millipedes in the family Andrognathidae, containing three species: A. corticarius, A. grubbsi, and A. hoffmani. The fossil species Andrognathus burmiticus is known from approximately 99 million year old Burmese amber from Myanmar, showing that the genus had a much wider distribution in the past.
