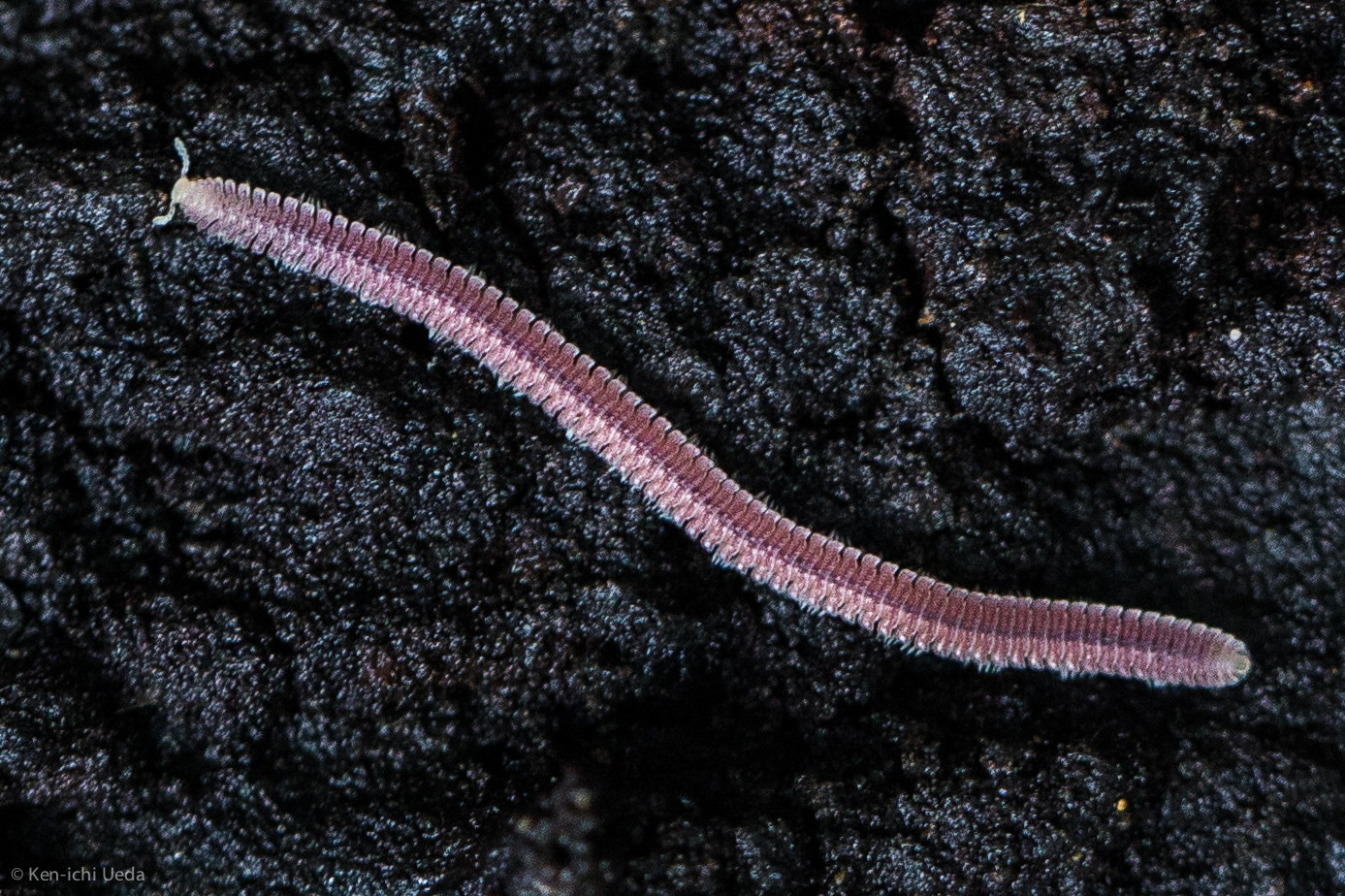

Scientific classification
- Kingdom: Animalia
- Phylum: Arthropoda
- Subphylum: Myriapoda
- Class: Diplopoda
- Order: Platydesmida
- Family: Andrognathidae
- Genus: Gosodesmus; Chamberlin, 1922
- Species: G. claremontus

Binomial name
- Gosodesmus claremontus Chamberlin, 1922

Synonyms
- Eucybe clarus Chamberlin, 1941; Eucybe longior Chamberlin, 1950; Eucybe auctus Chamberlin, 1954; Stenocybe waipea Chamberlin, 1950

= Gosodesmus =

Gosodesmus claremontus

Genus of millipedes

Gosodesmus is a genus of platydesmidan millipede, described by Ralph V. Chamberlin in 1922, that is widely distributed in the U.S. state of California. It is monotypic, being represented by the single species, Gosodesmus claremontus, commonly known as the pink feather boa millipede. Individuals vary in color from bright pink to coral, and may possess a black or purple dorsal stripe. Body length ranges from 17 to 27 mm (0.67 to 1.06 in), with up to 81 body segments. Gosodesmus claremontus occurs on the Coast Ranges as well as the Sierra Nevada, and is often found within rotted wood, especially oaks. In 2020, chemist Dr. Tappey Jones at Virginia Military Institute and colleagues, discovered a novel natural product and alkaloid in the chemical defense secretion of G. claremontus: (1), 7-(4-methylpent-3-en-1-yl)-1,2,3,5,8,8a-hexahydroindolizine, known as gosodesmine.
