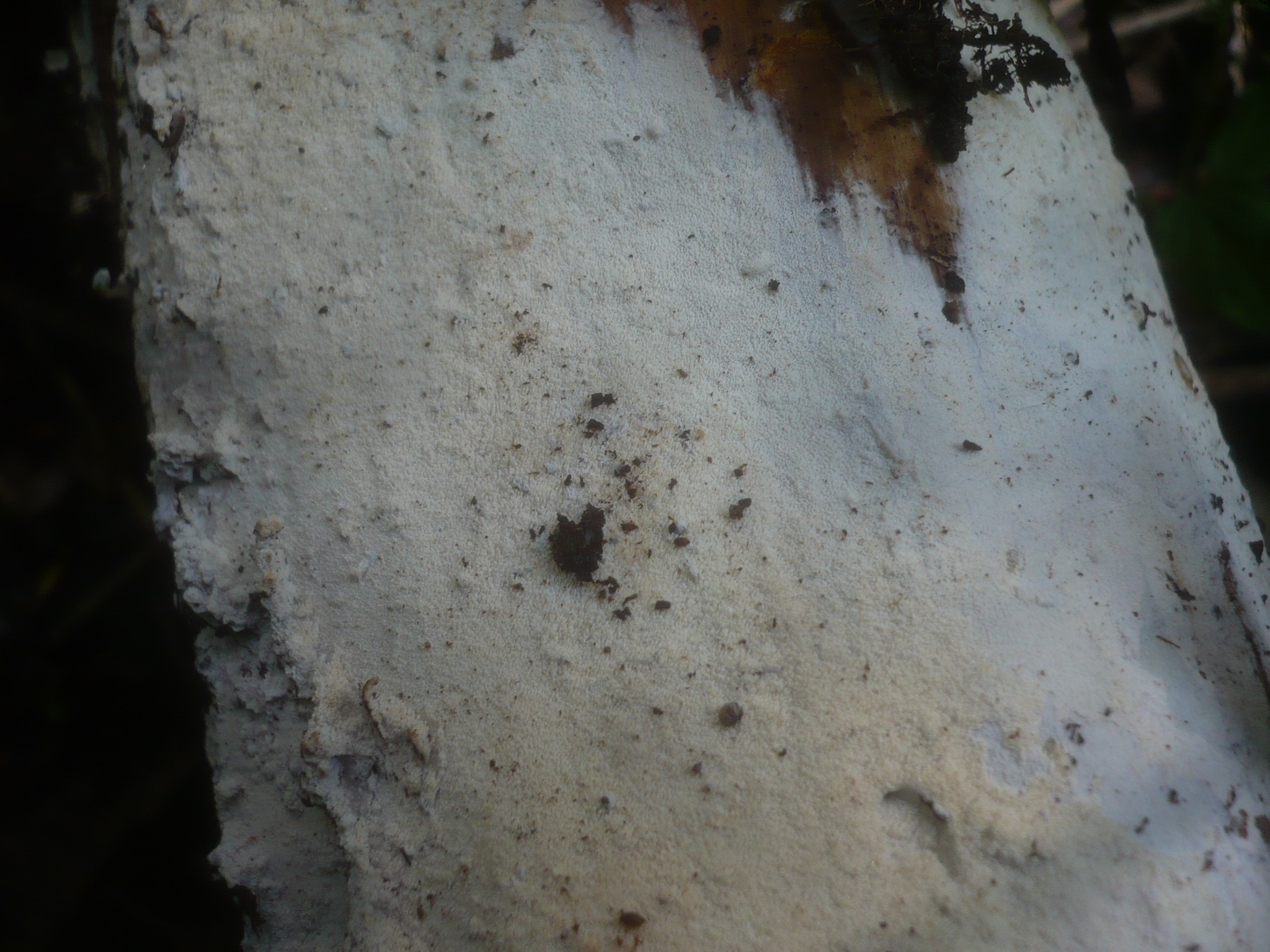
- Xylodon pruni

Scientific classification
- Kingdom: Fungi
- Division: Basidiomycota
- Class: Agaricomycetes
- Order: Hymenochaetales
- Family: Schizoporaceae
- Genus: Xylodon (Pers.) Fr. (1818)

Type species
- Xylodon quercinus (Pers.) Gray (1821)

Synonyms
- Sistotrema sect. Xylodon Pers. (1801)

= Xylodon =

Genus of fungi

Xylodon is a genus of crust fungi in the family Schizoporaceae.

== Species ==
The following species are recognised in the genus Xylodon:

- Xylodon acuminatus Viner & K.H. Larss. (2022)
- Xylodon acystidiatus Xue W. Wang & L.W. Zhou (2021)
- Xylodon adhaerisporus (Langer) Hjortstam & Ryvarden (2009)
- Xylodon afromontanus Yurchenko & Viner (2024)
- Xylodon angustisporus Viner & Ryvarden (2021)
- Xylodon anmashanensis (Yurchenko, H.X. Xiong & Sheng H. Wu) Riebesehl, Yurch. & Langer (2017)
- Xylodon apacheriensis (Gilb. & Canf.) Hjortstam & Ryvarden (2009)
- Xylodon asiaticus X.C. Zhang & C.L. Zhao (2024)
- Xylodon asper (Fr.) Hjortstam & Ryvarden (2009)
- Xylodon astrocystidiatus (Yurchenko & Sheng H. Wu) Riebesehl, Yurch. & Langer (2017)
- Xylodon attenuatus Spirin & Viner (2018)
- Xylodon australis (Berk.) Hjortstam & Ryvarden (2007)
- Xylodon bamburesupinus J.H. Dong & C.L. Zhao (2024)
- Xylodon bambusinus C.L. Zhao & X. Ma (2021)
- Xylodon bisporus (Boidin & Gilles) Hjortstam & Ryvarden (2009)
- Xylodon borealis (Kotir. & Saaren.) Hjortstam & Ryvarden (2009)
- Xylodon bresinskyi (Langer) Hjortstam & Ryvarden (2009)
- Xylodon brevisetus (P. Karst.) Hjortstam & Ryvarden (2009)
- Xylodon bubalinus (Min Wang, Yuan Y. Chen & B.K. Cui) Che C. Chen & Sheng H. Wu (2018)
- Xylodon calongei (M. Dueñas, Tellería, Melo & M.P. Martín) Viner (2022)
- Xylodon candidissimus (Berk. & M.A. Curtis) Hjortstam & Ryvarden (2009)
- Xylodon capitatus (G. Cunn.) Hjortstam & Ryvarden (2009)
- Xylodon chinensis (Che C. Chen & Sheng H. Wu) Che C. Chen & Sheng H. Wu (2018)
- Xylodon crassihyphus (Douanla-Meli) Riebesehl & Langer (2017)
- Xylodon crassisporus (Gresl. & Rajchenb.) Hjortstam & Ryvarden (2009)
- Xylodon cremeoparinaceus Qi Yuan & C.L. Zhao (2024)
- Xylodon crustosoglobosus (Hallenb. & Hjortstam) Hjortstam & Ryvarden (2009)
- Xylodon crystalliger Viner (2018)
- Xylodon cymosus (D.P. Rogers & H.S. Jacks.) Viner & Miettinen (2022)
- Xylodon cystidiatus (A. David & Rajchenb.) Riebesehl & Langer (2017)
- Xylodon damansaraensis Xue W. Wang & L.W. Zhou (2021)
- Xylodon daweishanensis C.L. Zhao (2023)
- Xylodon detriticus (Bourdot) K.H. Larss., Viner & Spirin (2018)
- Xylodon dimiticus (Jia J. Chen & L.W. Zhou) Riebesehl & Langer (2017)
- Xylodon dissiliens Viner & Ryvarden (2021)
- Xylodon echinatus (Yurchenko & Sheng H. Wu) Riebesehl, Yurch. & Langer (2017)
- Xylodon erikssonii (M. Galán & J.E. Wright) Riebesehl & Langer (2019)
- Xylodon exilis Yurchenko, Riebesehl & Langer (2019)
- Xylodon filicinus Yurchenko & Riebesehl (2019)
- Xylodon fissilis J.H. Dong & C.L. Zhao (2024)
- Xylodon fissuratus C.L. Zhao (2023)
- Xylodon flaviporus (Berk. & M.A. Curtis ex Cooke) Riebesehl & Langer (2017)
- Xylodon flocculosus C.L. Zhao (2022)
- Xylodon follis Riebesehl, Yurchenko & Langer (2019)
- Xylodon gamundiae (Gresl. & Rajchenb.) Riebesehl & Langer (2019)
- Xylodon gloeocystidiifer Yurchenko & Riebesehl (2024)
- Xylodon gossypinus C.L. Zhao & K.Y. Luo (2021)
- Xylodon gracilis (Hjortstam & Ryvarden) Hjortstam & Ryvarden (2009)
- Xylodon grandineus K.Y. Luo & C.L. Zhao (2022)
- Xylodon hallenbergii (Sheng H. Wu) Hjortstam & Ryvarden (2009)
- Xylodon hastifer (Hjortstam & Ryvarden) Hjortstam & Ryvarden (2009)
- Xylodon heterocystidiatus (H.X. Xiong, Y.C. Dai & Sheng H. Wu) Riebesehl, Yurch. & Langer (2017)
- Xylodon hjortstamii (Gresl. & Rajchenb.) Riebesehl & Langer (2019)
- Xylodon hydnoides J.H. Dong & C.L. Zhao (2024)
- Xylodon hyphodontinus (Hjortstam & Ryvarden) Riebesehl, Yurchenko & G. Gruhn (2019)
- Xylodon jacobaeus J. Fernández-López, M. Dueñas, M.P. Martín & Telleria (2018)
- Xylodon knysnanus (Van der Byl) Hjortstam & Ryvarden (2009)
- Xylodon kunmingensis L.W. Zhou & C.L. Zhao (2019)
- Xylodon laceratus C.L. Zhao (2021)
- Xylodon lagenicystidiatus Xue W. Wang & L.W. Zhou (2021)
- Xylodon lanatus (Burds. & Nakasone) Hjortstam & Ryvarden (2007)
- Xylodon laurentianus J. Fernández-López, Telleria, M. Dueñas & M.P. Martín (2019)
- Xylodon laxiusculus Viner & Ryvarden (2021)
- Xylodon luteodontioides Qi Yuan & C.L. Zhao (2024)
- Xylodon lutescens (Hjortstam & Ryvarden) Hjortstam & Ryvarden (2009)
- Xylodon macrosporus C.L. Zhao & K.Y. Luo (2021)
- Xylodon magallanesii Fernández-López, Telleria, M. Dueñas, M. Laguna & M.P. Martín (2020)
- Xylodon magnificus (Gresl. & Rajchenb.) K.H. Larss. (2018)
- Xylodon mantiqueirensis Yurchenko, Motato-Vasq. & Viner (2024)
- Xylodon mollissimus (L.W. Zhou) Che C. Chen & Sheng H. Wu (2018)
- Xylodon montanus C.L. Zhao (2021)
- Xylodon muchuanensis Xue W. Wang & L.W. Zhou (2024)
- Xylodon mussooriensis Samita, Sanyal & Dhingra ex L.W. Zhou & T.W. May (2021)
- Xylodon neotropicus Yurchenko, Motato-Vásq. & Viner (2024)
- Xylodon nesporii (Bres.) Hjortstam & Ryvarden (2009)
- Xylodon nesporina (Hallenb. & Hjortstam) Hjortstam & Ryvarden (2009)
- Xylodon niemelaei (Sheng H. Wu) Hjortstam & Ryvarden (2009)
- Xylodon nongravis (Lloyd) Che C. Chen & Sheng H. Wu (2018)
- Xylodon nothofagi (G. Cunn.) Hjortstam & Ryvarden (2009)
- Xylodon novozelandicus J. Fernández-López, Telleria, M. Dueñas & M.P. Martín (2019)
- Xylodon nudisetus (Warcup & P.H.B. Talbot) Hjortstam & Ryvarden (2009)
- Xylodon olivaceobubalinus J.H. Dong & C.L. Zhao (2024)
- Xylodon ovisporus (Corner) Riebesehl & Langer (2017)
- Xylodon papillosus (Fr.) Riebesehl, Yurch. & Langer (2017)
- Xylodon patagonicus J. Fernández-López, Telleria, M. Dueñas & M.P. Martín (2019)
- Xylodon pelliculae (H. Furuk.) Riebesehl, Yurch. & Langer (2017)
- Xylodon pingbianensis J.H. Dong & C.L. Zhao (2024)
- Xylodon poroideoefibulatus (Sheng H. Wu) Hjortstam & Ryvarden (2009)
- Xylodon poroides Qi Yuan & C.L. Zhao (2024)
- Xylodon pruinosus (Bres.) Spirin & Viner (2018)
- Xylodon pruniaceus (Hjortstam & Ryvarden) Hjortstam & Ryvarden (2009)
- Xylodon pseudolanatus Nakasone, Yurchenko & Riebesehl (2019)
- Xylodon pseudotropicus (C.L. Zhao, B.K. Cui & Y.C. Dai) Riebesehl, Yurch. & Langer (2017)
- Xylodon puerensis C.L. Zhao (2023)
- Xylodon pumilius (Gresl. & Rajchenb.) K.H. Larss. (2018)
- Xylodon punctus K.Y. Luo & C.L. Zhao (2022)
- Xylodon radula (Fr.) Ţura, Zmitr., Wasser & Spirin (2011)
- Xylodon raduloides Riebesehl & Langer (2017)
- Xylodon ramicida Spirin & Miettinen (2015)
- Xylodon reticulatus (Che C. Chen & Sheng H. Wu) Che C. Chen & Sheng H. Wu (2018)
- Xylodon rhizomorphus (C.L. Zhao, B.K. Cui & Y.C. Dai) Riebesehl, Yurch. & Langer (2017)
- Xylodon rhododendricola Xue W. Wang & L.W. Zhou (2021)
- Xylodon rickii (Hjortstam & Ryvarden) K.H. Larss. (2018)
- Xylodon rimosissimus (Peck) Hjortstam & Ryvarden (2009)
- Xylodon rudis (Hjortstam & Ryvarden) Hjortstam & Ryvarden (2009)
- Xylodon scopinellus (Berk.) Hjortstam & Ryvarden (2009)
- Xylodon septocystidiatus (H.X. Xiong, Y.C. Dai & Sheng H. Wu) Riebesehl & Langer (2019)
- Xylodon sinensis C.L. Zhao & K.Y. Luo (2021)
- Xylodon stratosus (Hjortstam & Ryvarden) Hjortstam & Ryvarden (2007)
- Xylodon subclavatus (Yurchenko, H.X. Xiong & Sheng H. Wu) Riebesehl, Yurch. & Langer (2017)
- Xylodon subflaviporus Che C. Chen & Sheng H. Wu (2018)
- Xylodon subglobosus Samita, Sanyal & Dhingra ex L.W. Zhou & T.W. May (2021)
- Xylodon submucronatus (Hjortstam & Renvall) Hjortstam & Ryvarden (2009)
- Xylodon subscopinellus (G. Cunn.) Hjortstam & Ryvarden (2009)
- Xylodon subserpentiformis Xue W. Wang & L.W. Zhou (2021)
- Xylodon subtilissimus Viner & Spirin (2022)
- Xylodon subtropicus (Che C. Chen & Sheng H. Wu) Che C. Chen & Sheng H. Wu (2018)
- Xylodon syringae (Langer) Hjortstam & Ryvarden (2009)
- Xylodon taiwanianus (Sheng H. Wu) Hjortstam & Ryvarden (2009)
- Xylodon tenellus Hjortstam & Ryvarden (2007)
- Xylodon tenuicystidius (Hjortstam & Ryvarden) Hjortstam & Ryvarden (2009)
- Xylodon trametoides (Núñez) Riebesehl & Langer (2017)
- Xylodon tropicus C.L. Zhao (2021)
- Xylodon tuberculatus (Kotir. & Saaren.) Hjortstam & Ryvarden (2009)
- Xylodon ussuriensis Viner (2018)
- Xylodon verecundus (G. Cunn.) Yurchenko & Riebesehl (2019)
- Xylodon verruculosus (J. Erikss. & Hjortstam) Hjortstam & Ryvarden (2009)
- Xylodon vesiculosus Yurchenko, Nakasone & Riebesehl (2019)
- Xylodon victoriensis Xue W. Wang & L.W. Zhou (2021)
- Xylodon wenshanensis K.Y. Luo & C.L. Zhao (2022)
- Xylodon wumengshanensis Qi Yuan & C.L. Zhao (2024)
- Xylodon xinpingensis C.L. Zhao & X. Ma (2021)
- Xylodon yarraensis Xue W. Wang & L.W. Zhou (2021)
- Xylodon yunnanensis Xue W. Wang & L.W. Zhou (2021)
