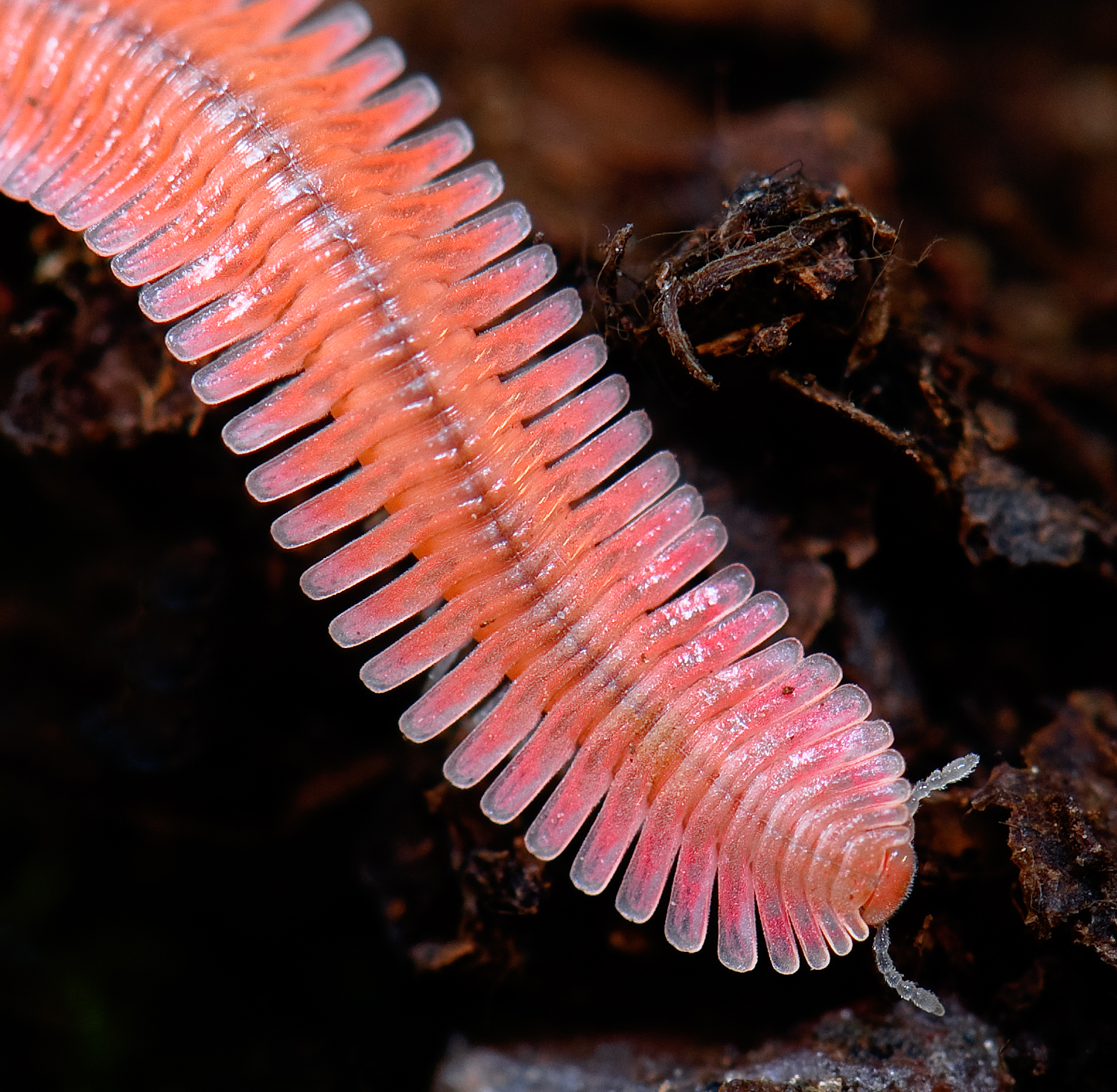
- Brachycybe lecontii (Androganthidae), a species found in eastern North America

Scientific classification
- Domain: Eukaryota
- Kingdom: Animalia
- Phylum: Arthropoda
- Subphylum: Myriapoda
- Class: Diplopoda
- Subclass: Chilognatha
- Infraclass: Helminthomorpha
- Subterclass: Colobognatha
- Order: Platydesmida; Cook, 1895

Families
- Andrognathidae; Platydesmidae

= Platydesmida =

Order of millipedes

Platydesmida (Greek for platy "flat" and desmos "bond") is an order of millipedes containing two families and over 60 species. Some species practice paternal care, in which males guard the eggs.

== Description ==
Platydesmidans have a flattened body shape with lateral extensions (paranota) on each segment. They lack eyes, and have between 30 and 110 body segments. They measure up to 60 mm (2.4 in) in length.

== Behavior ==
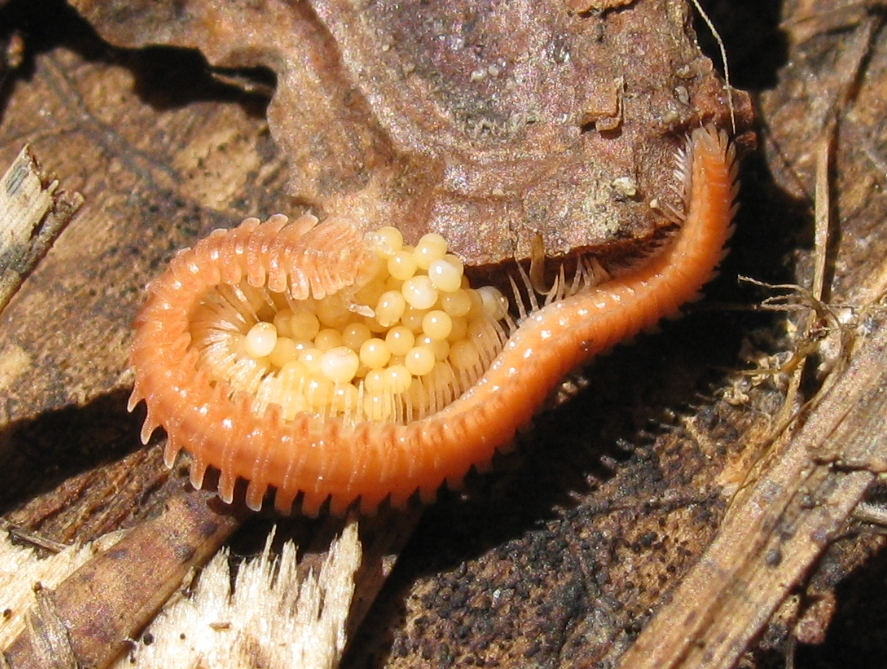
A male Brachycybe with eggs

While most millipedes feed on dead or decomposing leaf litter platydesmidans may be specialized to feed on fungi. Platydesmidans have also been studied with regard to parental investment, in that males of some species coil around eggs and young, a rare example of paternal care in arthropods. This behavior has been observed in species of Brachycybe from North America and Japan, and Yamasinaium from Japan, all are in the family Andrognathidae.

== Evolutionary history ==
The only described fossil of the order is from the Mid Cretaceous (~100 Ma) Burmese amber, belonging to the extant genus Andrognathus, several undescribed specimens belonging to the order are known from the same deposit.

== Distribution ==
Platydesmidans occur in North America, Central America, the Mediterranean region of Europe, Japan, China, southeast Asia and Indonesia.

== Classification ==
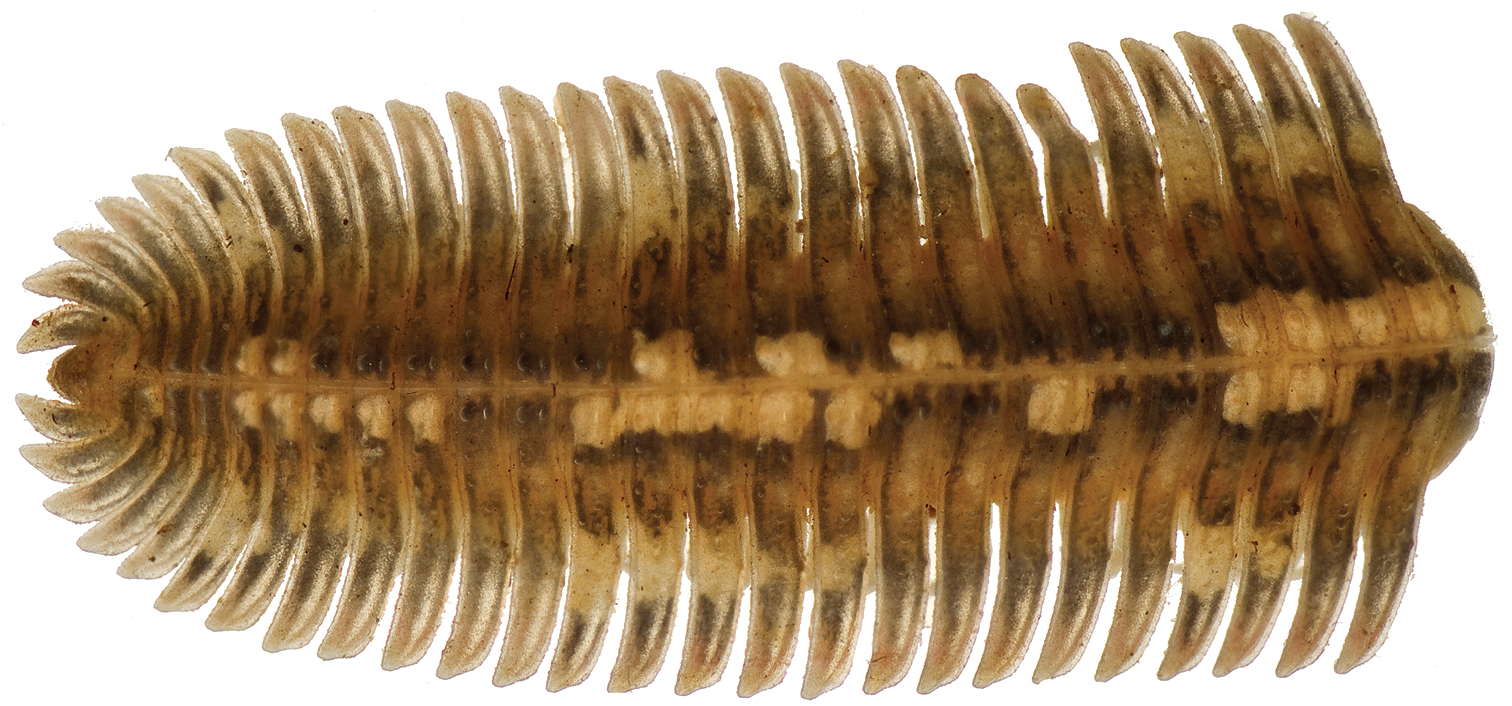
Pseudodesmus sp. (Androganthidae), posterior section, from Laos

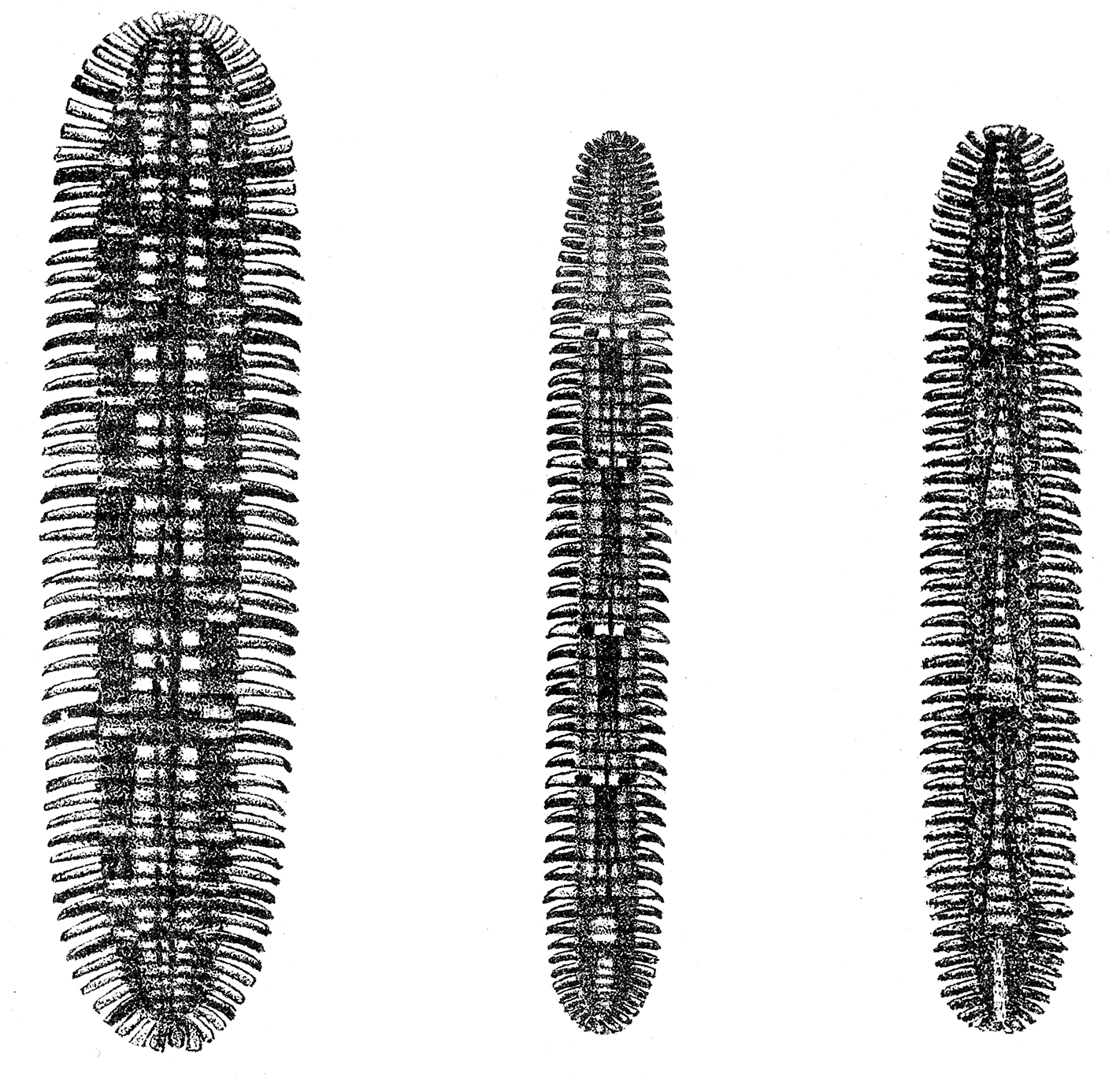
Three species of Platydesmus (Platydesmidae)

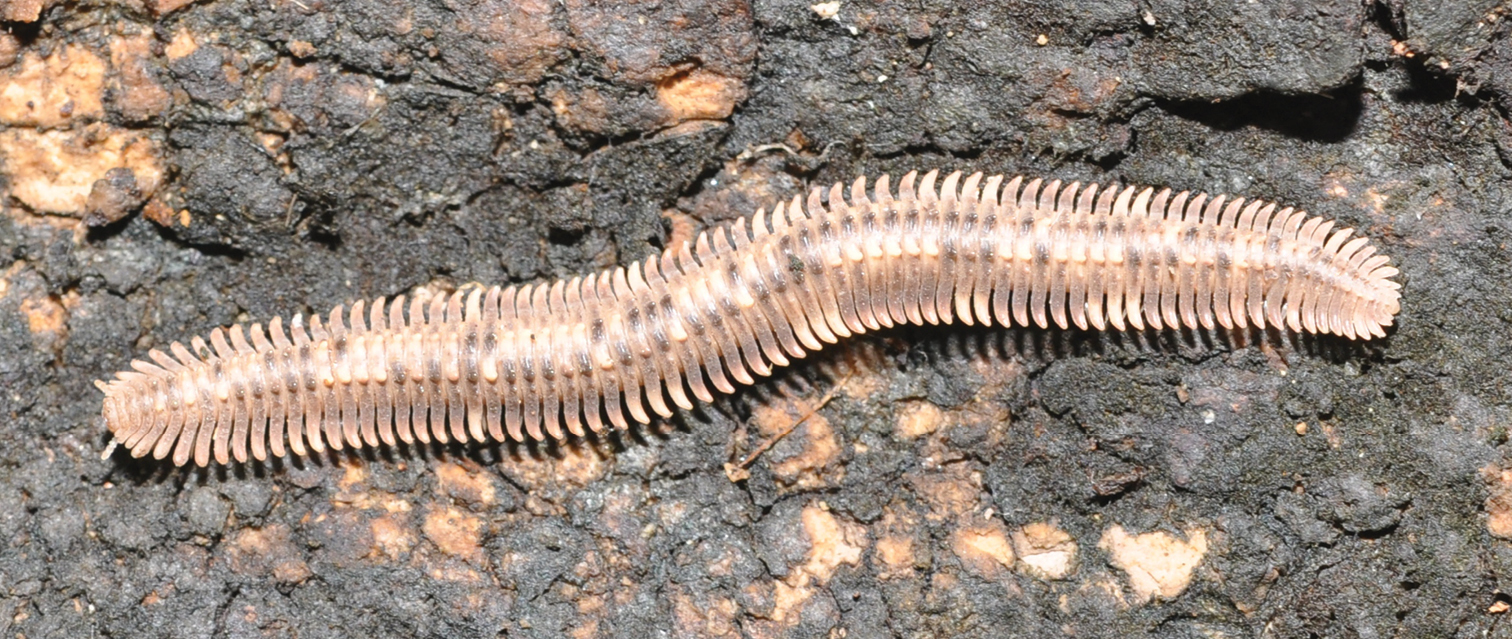
Unidentified platydesmid from Malaysia

The order contains two families.

Family Andrognathidae Cope, 1869

- Andrognathus
- Bazillozonium
- Brachycybe
- Corcyrozonium
- Dolistenus
- Fioria
- Gosodesmus
- Ischnocybe
- Mitocybe
- Pseudodesmus
- Sumatronium
- Symphyopleurium
- Trichozonium
- Yamasinaium
- Zinaceps
- Zinazonium

Family Platydesmidae DeSaussure, 1860

- Desmethus
- Platydesmus
