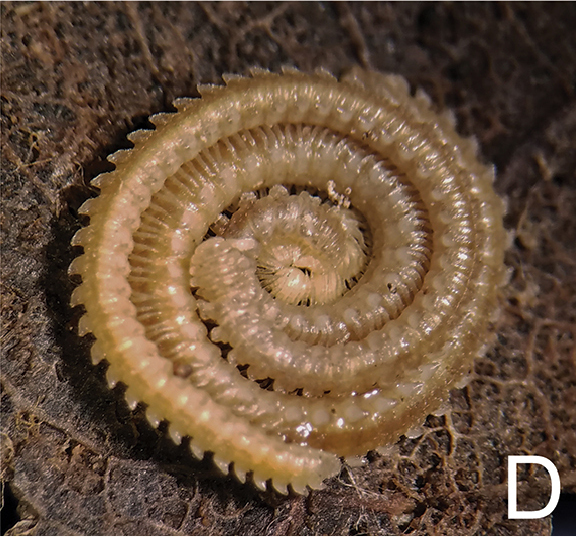
- Andrognathus corticarius

Scientific classification
- Kingdom: Animalia
- Phylum: Arthropoda
- Subphylum: Myriapoda
- Class: Diplopoda
- Order: Platydesmida
- Family: Andrognathidae; Cope, 1869

= Andrognathidae =

Family of millipedes

Andrognathidae is a family of millipede in the order Platydesmida. There are about 17 genera and more than 30 described species in Andrognathidae.

== Genera ==
These 17 genera belong to the family Andrognathidae:

- Andrognathus Cope, 1869
- Bazillozonium Verhoeff, 1935
- Brachycybe Wood, 1864
- Dolistenus Fanzago, 1874
- Ebenostenus Mauriès, 2015
- Fioria Silvestri, 1898
- Gosodesmus Chamberlin, 1922
- Ischnocybe Cook & Loomis, 1928
- Mitocybe Cook & Loomis, 1928
- Phaeacobius Attems
- Plutodesmus Silvestri, 1903
- Pseudodesmus Pocock, 1887
- Sinocybe Loomis, 1942
- Symphyopleurium Attems, 1951
- Trichozonium
- Yamasinaium Verhoeff, 1939
- Zinaceps
