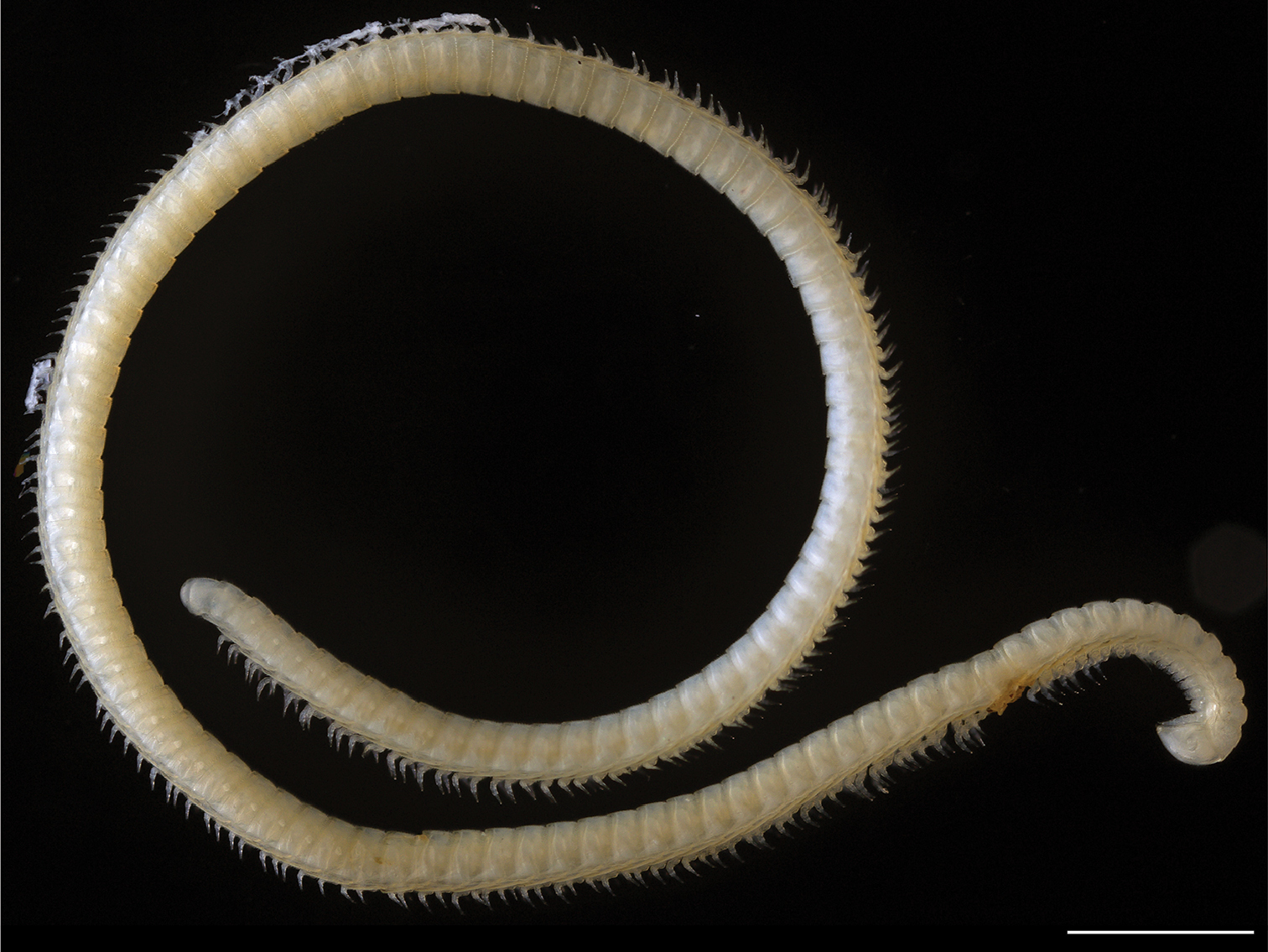
- Illacme tobini

Scientific classification
- Domain: Eukaryota
- Kingdom: Animalia
- Phylum: Arthropoda
- Subphylum: Myriapoda
- Class: Diplopoda
- Order: Siphonophorida
- Family: Siphonorhinidae
- Genus: Illacme
- Species: I. tobini

Binomial name
- Illacme tobini Marek, Shear & Krejca, 2016

= Illacme tobini =

Species of millipede

Illacme tobini is a species of millipede in the family Siphonorhinidae. It was discovered in California at Sequoia National Park in 2016. This millipede is part of the Illacme genus, which contains only two other species, Illacme plenipes and Illacme socal.
