= Siphonacme lyttoni =

Scientific classification
- Kingdom: Animalia
- Phylum: Arthropoda
- Subphylum: Myriapoda
- Class: Diplopoda
- Order: Siphonophorida
- Family: Siphonophoridae
- Genus: Siphonacme
- Species: S. lyttoni

Binomial name
- Siphonacme lyttoni Cook & Loomis, 1928

Species of millipede

Siphonacme lyttoni is a species of millipede in the family Siphonophoridae. This millipede is found in Arizona. This species is notable for including a specimen with 742 legs, which places this millipede in a tie with Siphonophora millepeda for the species with the third most legs in the animal kingdom.

== Discovery and taxonomy ==
This species was first described in 1928 by the American biologists Orator F. Cook and Harold F. Loomis based on eleven specimens. These specimens were collected in 1924 and 1925 at the crest of the Pinal Mountains in Arizona, 1.25 miles (2 km) north of the line between Gila and Pima counties, near the highest point on the road between the towns of Miami and Superior. Specimens were found under large stones on slightly moist soil (mostly loose decomposed granite) near the summit of a pass in an open dry space without vegetation. The type specimens include a male holotype and six paratypes (five females and one male). The holotype is deposited in the National Museum of Natural History of the Smithsonian Institution in Washington, D.C., and three female paratypes are deposited in the Virginia Museum of Natural History in Martinsville, Virginia. Cook and Loomis explicitly designated S. lyttoni as the type species for the genus Siphonacme, which they simultaneously described to contain this species.

== Distribution ==
Since the original description of this species based on specimens collected from the type locality (between Miami and Superior in Arizona), this millipede has been found at other sites in Arizona. For example, Loomis later collected more specimens in Prescott and in the Chiricahua Mountains. The range of this species includes localities in Gila, Yavapai, and Cochise counties in Arizona.

== Description ==
This species can feature as many as 190 segments and 371 pairs of legs. Most specimens, however, feature far fewer segments and correspondingly fewer legs. In the original description of this species, for example, Cook and Loomis describe males with 78 to 108 segments and females with 88 to 121 segments. This millipede has a slender body that can reach 29 mm in length and 0.9 mm in width. The head features a slender beak in front that is relatively short, less than a third as long as the rounded part of the head. The antennae are swollen and shaped like clubs, with a sense organ (sensillum) shaped like an oval on the lateral surface of the fifth segment of each antenna.

The head, antennae, and first segment (collum) are white, but the beak is a pale yellow. A dull pinkish band runs down the middle of the body from the second segment through the fourth segment, broadens and divides on the fifth segment, gradually becomes paler toward the middle of the body, and ultimately disappears so that the posterior segments are white. The large sensilla on the antennae are visible as distinct orange-yellow spots. When illuminated with ultraviolet light, this species exhibits autoflorescence, with a uniform blue flourescence except for the beak and the sensilla on the antennae, which are a green hue instead.

The collum is slightly wider than the head and features a shallow indentation on the anterior margin. The tergites on the following segments are also slightly wider than the head and markedly convex, with tubercles on the surface. On the posterior part of each segment, hairs emerge from between the tubercles. The last two segments are longer than the preceding segments and lack legs. The last segment is distinctly longer than the penultimate segment.

The gonopods are simple, long, and slender, with the anterior pair extending forward beyond the base of the preceding two leg pairs and the posterior pair longer and more slender than the anterior pair. Each of the anterior gonopods features five segments, with the most distal segment slightly tapering, slender, and as long or slightly longer than the other four segments combined. The posterior pair reach forward between the anterior pair and extend to the tips of the anterior pair. On each of the posterior gonopods, the most distal segment is longer than the other segments combined.

This species shares a distinctive set of traits with the other North American species in the same genus, S. pseustes, which is found in Mexico. In particular, each of the anterior gonopods in both species features five segments, with the most distal segment as long or longer than the other segments combined. These two species can be distinguished, however, based on the width of the collum and tergites, which are only slightly broader than the head in S. lyttoni but much broader than the head in S. psuestes.
