= Siphonophora albiceps =

Scientific classification
- Domain: Eukaryota
- Kingdom: Animalia
- Phylum: Arthropoda
- Subphylum: Myriapoda
- Class: Diplopoda
- Order: Siphonophorida
- Family: Siphonophoridae
- Genus: Siphonophora
- Species: S. albiceps

Binomial name
- Siphonophora albiceps Loomis, 1970

Species of millipede

Siphonophora albiceps is a species of millipede belonging to the family Siphonophoridae. The species is distinct for the contrast of its white front with its dark middle, its small body, and large middle joints in its first pair of legs. It was first described by Harold Loomis in 1970 and its type locality is in the U.S. Virgin Islands.

== Description ==
The largest specimens of Siphonophora albiceps was a female which had 41 segments and was 7 mm long and 0.8 mm wide. Most specimens have around 32 segments, and in general the females are wider than the males. They have fused pairs of segments which form diplosegments, and the rear half of these pairs rise distinctly above the front half. Their antennae, head, and front one or two body segments are white, and stand out in contrast to the middle and rear of the body which is a dark color.

Their head is short and not quite the shape of a half sphere. They have slender beaks which are just over half as long as the head. The antennae are long and thick, unlike similar species. The front end of the body is wider than the rest, a change which occurs quickly along its length. The surface of the head, first segment, and the rear halves of the diplosegments are densely covered with bristly hairs (setae) of different lengths and numbers. At the base of these hairs are dense arrangements of small, shiny granules which keep the hairs upright. Both males and females have large middle joints on their first pairs of legs which stand out from the rest of the legs.
