= Gonatotrichus silhouettensis =

Conservation status
- Endangered (IUCN 3.1)

Scientific classification
- Kingdom: Animalia
- Phylum: Arthropoda
- Subphylum: Myriapoda
- Class: Diplopoda
- Order: Siphonophorida
- Family: Siphonophoridae
- Genus: Gonatotrichus
- Species: G. silhouettensis

Binomial name
- Gonatotrichus silhouettensis (Mauriès, 1980)

Synonyms
- Siphonophorella silhouettensis Mauries, 1980; Siphonophora silhouettensis (Mauries, 1980)

Species of millipede

Gonatotrichus silhouettensis is a species of millipede in the family Siphonophoridae. The species is endemic to Silhouette Island in Seychelles.
