= Siphonophora millepeda =

Scientific classification
- Kingdom: Animalia
- Phylum: Arthropoda
- Subphylum: Myriapoda
- Class: Diplopoda
- Order: Siphonophorida
- Family: Siphonophoridae
- Genus: Siphonophora
- Species: S. millepeda

Binomial name
- Siphonophora millepeda Loomis, 1934

Species of millipede

Siphonophora millepeda is a species of millipede in the family Siphonophoridae. This millipede is found in the republic of Trinidad and Tobago. This species is notable for including a specimen with 742 legs. This number places this millipede in a tie with Siphonacme lyttoni for the species with the third most legs in the animal kingdom.

== Discovery ==
This species was first described in 1934 by the American myriapodologist Harold F. Loomis based on a single adult female specimen. This specimen was found along with juveniles in 1932 under a rock in a grove of cacao trees on the hills above Charlotteville on Man-o-War Bay on the northeastern tip of the island of Tobago. The type specimen is deposited in the National Museum of Natural History of the Smithsonian Institution in Washington, D.C.

== Taxonomy ==
Some authorities consider S. millepeda a nomen dubium. They consider this species dubious because the original description was based on only a female specimen. Other authorities, however, accept this name and list S. millepeda as a valid species.

== Description ==
This species is notable for featuring many segments, with 190 in the only described specimen, and many legs, with 371 pairs. This millipede has the color of cream and can reach 58 mm in length and 1.3 mm in width. The head features a slender beak that is long enough to reach about as far as the distal ends of the stout antennae. The head is narrow, triangular, and shorter than the beak. The first five joints of each antenna feature hairs of various lengths, but the sixth and seventh joints are more densely covered with shorter hairs of uniform length. The first few leg pairs are smaller than the others and gradually increase in size over the first few segments. The body is densely covered with straight hairs that vary in length, with some moderately short but others four or five times longer. The posterior margin of the segments is uniformly and finely serrated.
