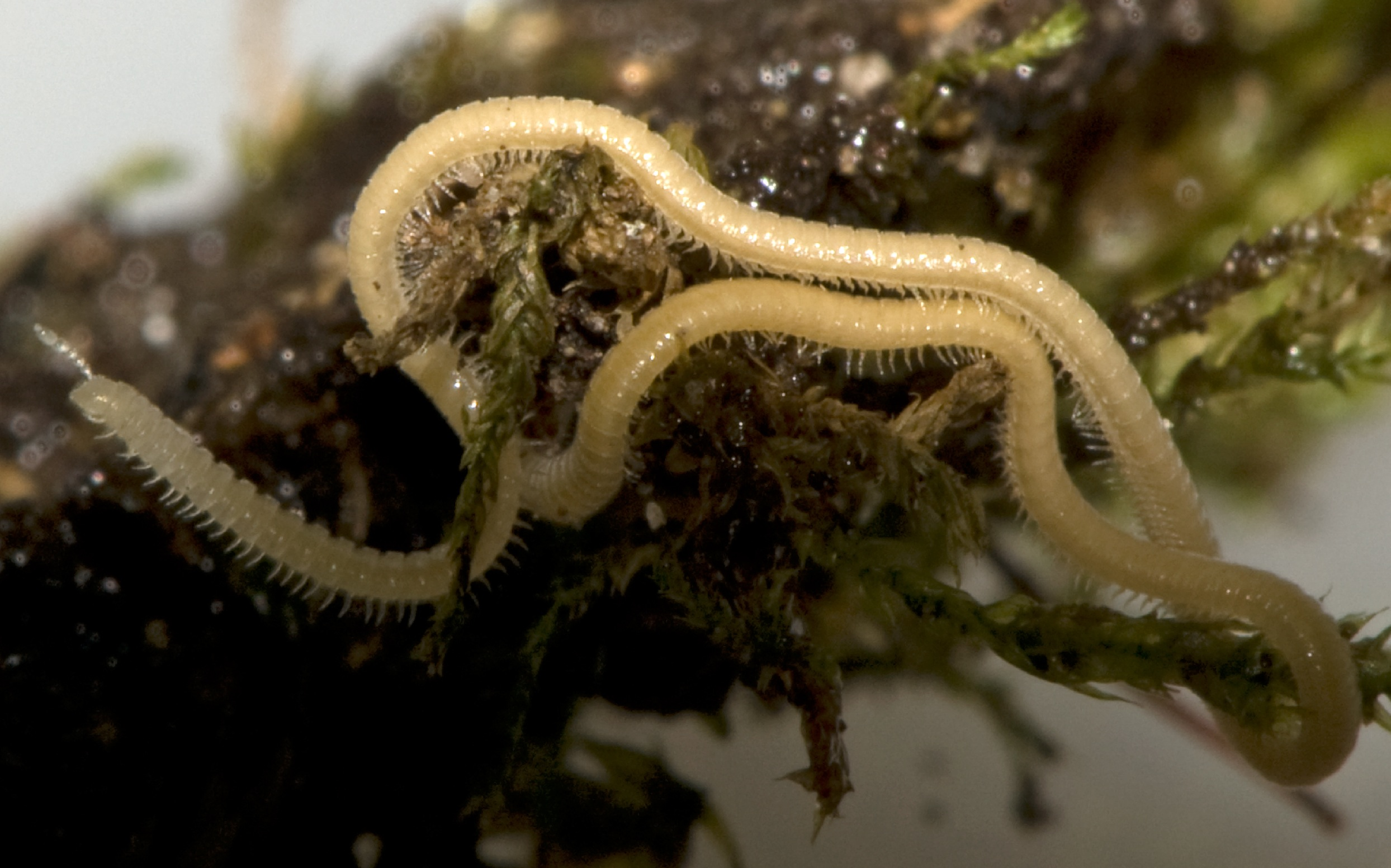
- A female I. plenipes with 618 legs

Scientific classification
- Kingdom: Animalia
- Phylum: Arthropoda
- Subphylum: Myriapoda
- Class: Diplopoda
- Order: Siphonophorida
- Family: Siphonorhinidae
- Genus: Illacme
- Species: I. plenipes

Binomial name
- Illacme plenipes Cook & Loomis, 1928
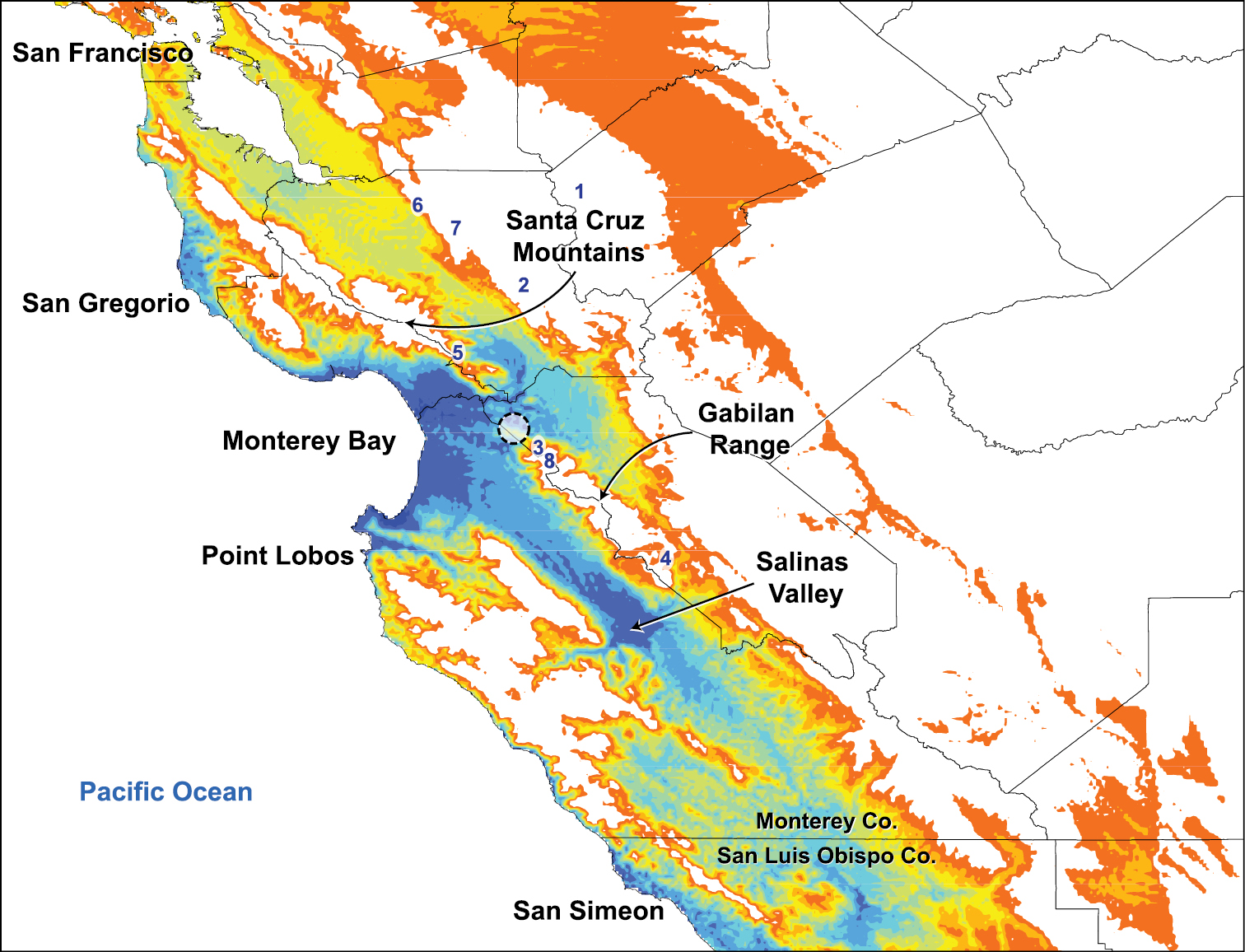
- Predicted habitat suitability (maximum in blue) for I. plenipes based on climatic variables

= Illacme plenipes =

Species of millipede

Illacme plenipes is a siphonorhinid millipede found in the central region of the U.S. state of California. It has up to 750 legs. One of three known species in the genus Illacme, it was first seen in 1926, but was not rediscovered until 2005, almost 80 years after its discovery, by Paul Marek, then a Ph.D. student at East Carolina University.

A female I. plenipes with 662 legs

== Description ==
On average, I. plenipes have over 600 legs, twice the average for millipede species, with one recorded specimen having 750 legs. It had the most legs of any species known until Eumillipes persephone was described in 2021, which had 1306 legs. It is relatively small-bodied among millipedes. Females grow to just over 3 cm; males are slightly smaller and have fewer legs.

== Taxonomic history ==
The species was first discovered in San Benito County, part of the California Floristic Province, in 1926 by federal scientist Orator Cook and formally described by Cook and Harold F. Loomis in 1928. Cook and Loomis described the species without illustrations, and in 1996 Rowland Shelley of the North Carolina Museum of Natural Sciences re-examined specimens and redescribed the species. Marek and colleagues produced a more detailed description of the morphology of I. plenipes in 2012 and provided refined illustrations based on scanning electron micrography.

== Classification ==
Illacme is a member of the order Siphonophorida and family Siphonorhinidae. A second species of the genus, Illacme tobini, was described in 2016. Based on a phylogenomic analysis of millipedes in the subterclass Colobognatha, the closest relative of Illacme is Nematozonium of South Africa which shares a long, narrow body shape and characteristics including gonopods.
