= Siphonophora humberti =

Scientific classification
- Kingdom: Animalia
- Phylum: Arthropoda
- Subphylum: Myriapoda
- Class: Diplopoda
- Order: Siphonophorida
- Family: Siphonophoridae
- Genus: Siphonophora
- Species: S. humberti

Binomial name
- Siphonophora humberti Pocock, 1892

Species of millipede

Siphonophora humberti, is a species of millipede in the family Siphonophoridae. It is endemic to Sri Lanka.
