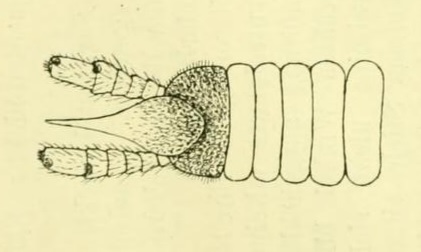
- Gonatotrichus minutus, anterior section

Scientific classification
- Domain: Eukaryota
- Kingdom: Animalia
- Phylum: Arthropoda
- Subphylum: Myriapoda
- Class: Diplopoda
- Order: Siphonophorida
- Family: Siphonophoridae
- Genus: Gonatotrichus
- Species: G. minutus

Binomial name
- Gonatotrichus minutus (Carl, 1922)

Synonyms
- Siphonophora minuta Carl, 1922

= Gonatotrichus minutus =

Species of millipede

Gonatotrichus minutus is a species of millipede in the family Siphonophoridae, described in 1922 by the Swiss zoologist Johann Carl. The species is endemic to Malaysia. Individuals are very small, around 5 millimetres (0.20 in) long and, 0.7 mm wide, with around 40 body segments. The color is brownish-yellow, with lighter-colored legs. It differs from other Malaysian siphonophorids by its small size, the aspect ratio of its beak and antennae and the shape of the front gonopods.
