= Siphonophora =

Siphonophora can refer to:

- Siphonophora (millipede), a genus of millipedes in the family Siphonophoridae
- Siphonophora, an alternative spelling of Siphonophorae, an order within Hydrozoa
