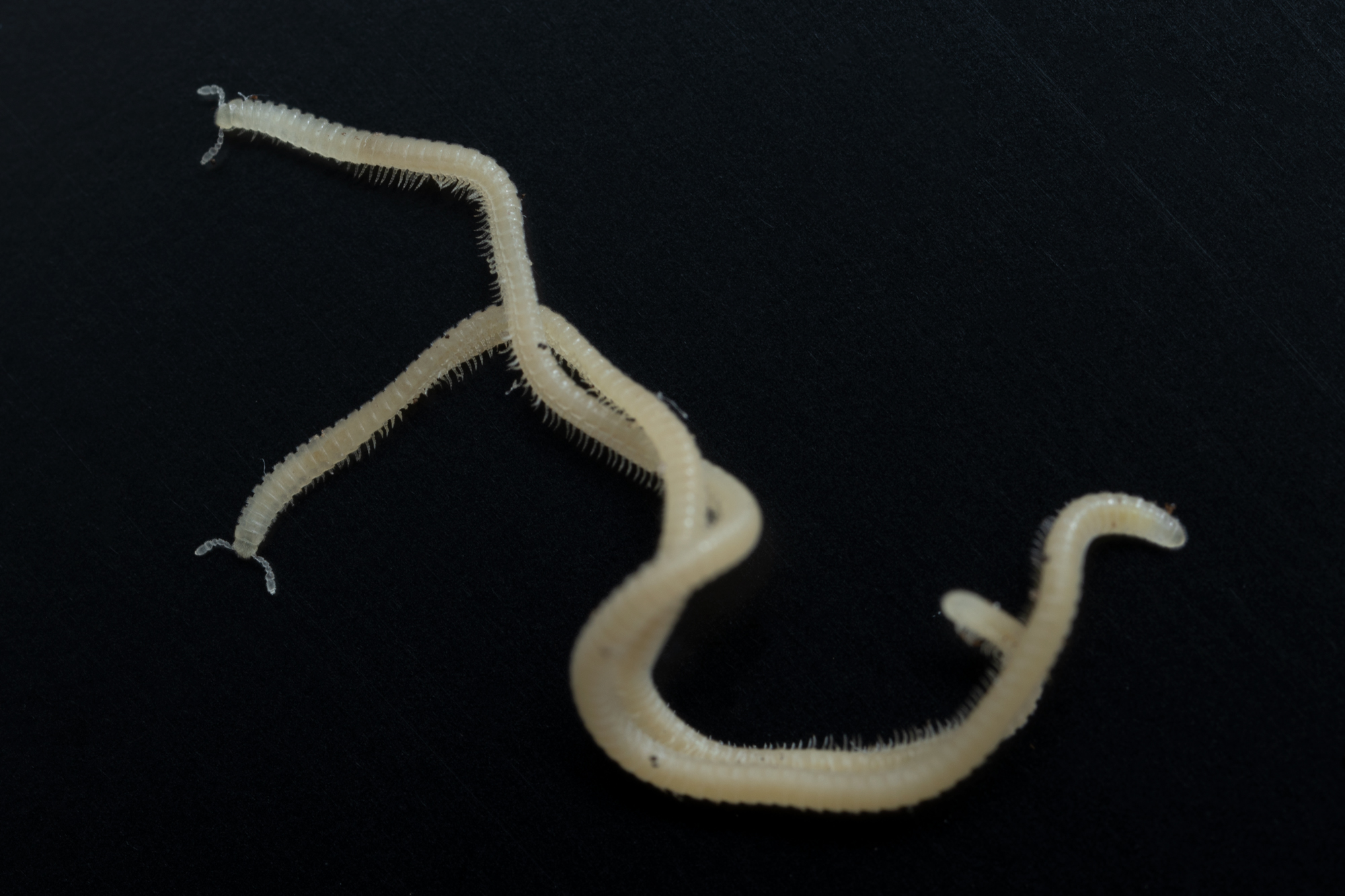
- Female and male I. socal

Scientific classification
- Domain: Eukaryota
- Kingdom: Animalia
- Phylum: Arthropoda
- Subphylum: Myriapoda
- Class: Diplopoda
- Order: Siphonophorida
- Family: Siphonorhinidae
- Genus: Illacme
- Species: I. socal

Binomial name
- Illacme socal Marek & Shear, 2023

= Illacme socal =

Species of millipede

Illacme socal is a species of millipede in the family Siphonorhinidae. It was discovered in California at Whiting Ranch Wilderness Park in 2018.

Known as the Los Angeles thread millipede, it is thin and elongate. Like all members of the genus Illacme, I. socal is eyeless, lacks pigmentation, has well-developed sensory structures, and displays other troglomorphic features.

The habitat of I. socal is the chaparral shrubland in California and live oak woodlands. They have been found beneath the humus layer and within the soil matrix.

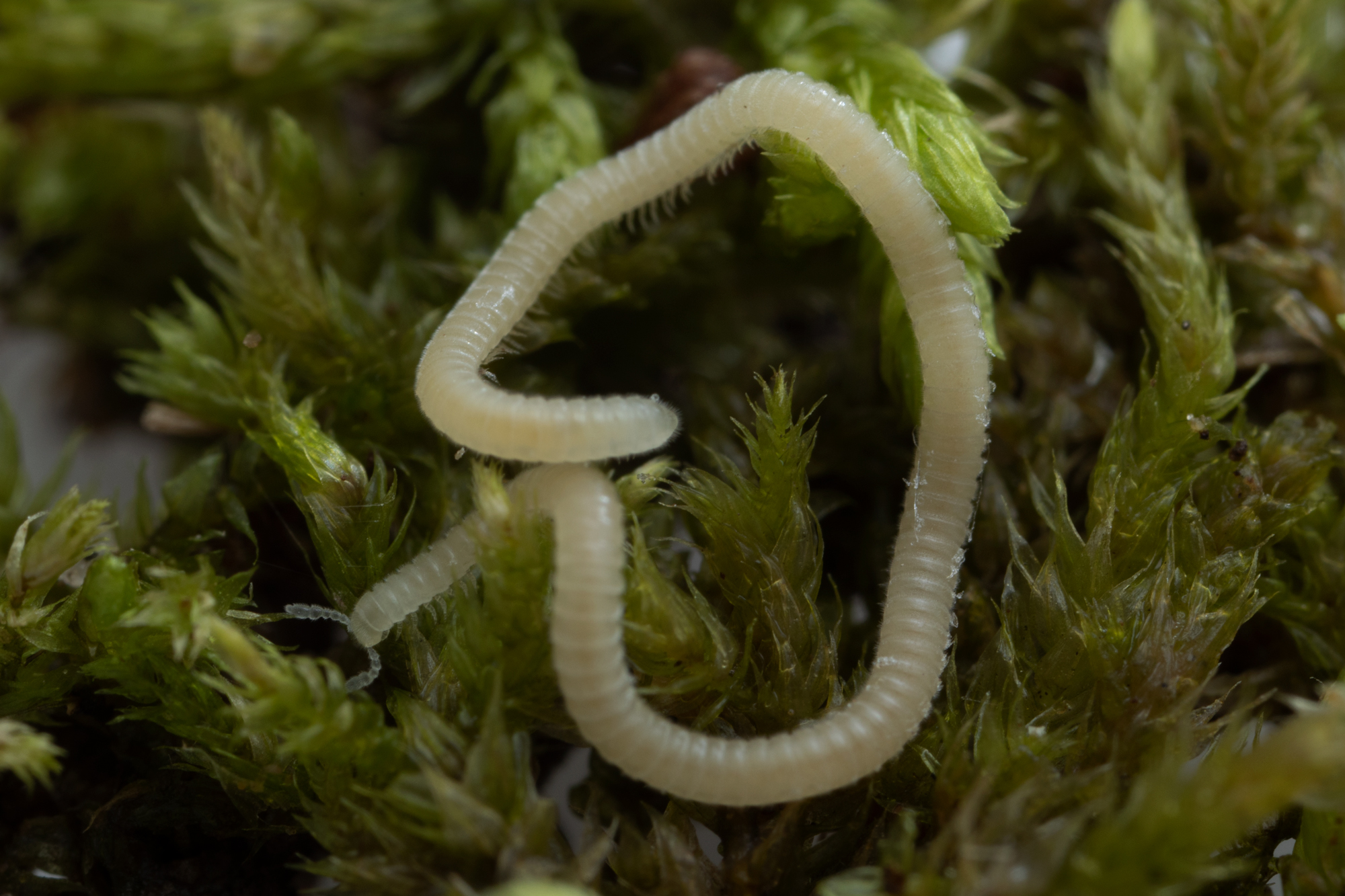
Male holotype, MPE04621. Note the silk-like exudate on the midbody rings.
