= Siphonacme =

- Siphonacme lyttoni

Scientific classification
- Kingdom: Animalia
- Phylum: Arthropoda
- Subphylum: Myriapoda
- Class: Diplopoda
- Order: Siphonophorida
- Family: Siphonophoridae
- Genus: Siphonacme; Cook & Loomis, 1928

Type species
- Siphonacme lyttoni Cook & Loomis, 1928

Synonyms
- Annamnium Verhoeff, 1941; Calofornizonium Verhoeff, 1941

Genus of millipedes

Siphonacme is a genus of millipedes in the family Siphonophoridae. This genus contains four species. These species include millipedes found in Arizona, Mexico, Vietnam, Cambodia, and Laos.

== Discovery and taxonomy ==
This genus was first described in 1928 by the American biologists Orator F. Cook and Harold F. Loomis. They proposed this genus to contain the newly discovered species S. lyttoni, which they simultaneously described and explicitly designated as the type species. They based their descriptions of this genus and its type species on specimens collected from a site in Arizona, 1.25 miles (2 km) north of the line between Gila and Pima counties, near the highest point on the road between the towns of Miami and Superior.

== Description ==
In adult males in the order Siphonophorida, leg pairs 8 and 9 are modified to become gonopods. The genus Siphonacme is closely related to the genus Siphonophora, but these two genera can be distinguished based on the form of the gonopods, in particular, the anterior pair of gonopods. Each of the anterior gonopods in species of Siphonacme features either five or six segments. The most distal of these segments is at least as long as the first three segments combined.

== Species ==
This genus includes four species:

- Siphonacme dawydoffi (Attems, 1938)
- Siphonacme lyttoni Cook & Loomis, 1928
- Siphonacme pseustes (Chamberlin, 1923)
- Siphonacme takashimai (Takakuwa, 1942)
