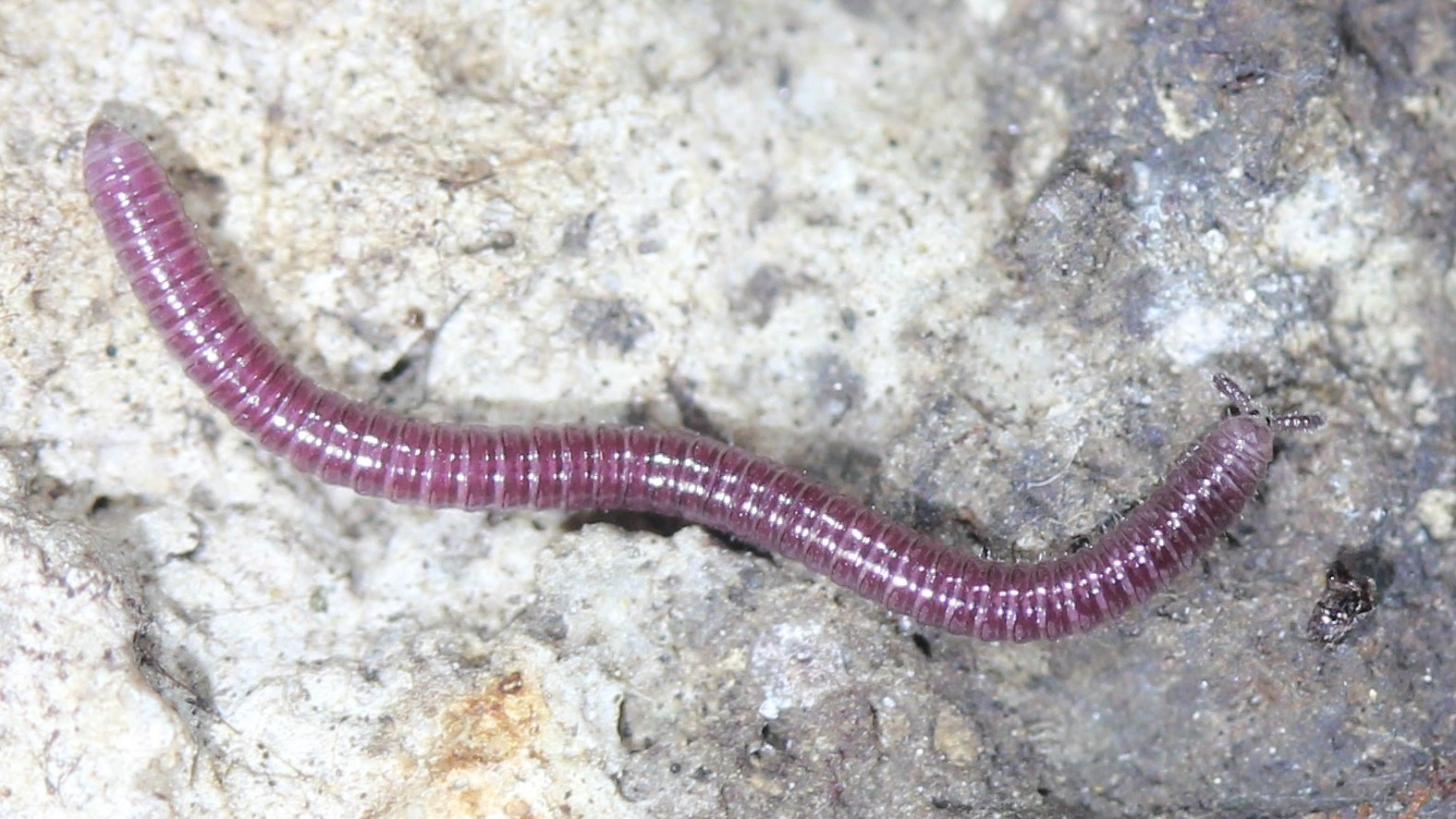

Scientific classification
- Kingdom: Animalia
- Phylum: Arthropoda
- Subphylum: Myriapoda
- Class: Diplopoda
- Order: Polyzoniida
- Family: Siphonotidae
- Genus: Rhinotus
- Species: R. purpureus

Binomial name
- Rhinotus purpureus (Pocock, 1894)

Synonyms
- Siphonotus purpureus Pocock, 1894

= Rhinotus purpureus =

Species of millipede

Rhinotus purpureus is a species of millipede in the family Siphonotidae. It is found in the Caribbean, Central America, North America, and South America.
