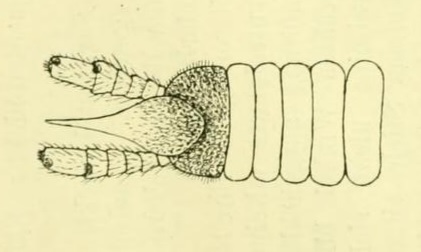
- Gonatotrichus minutus, anterior section

Scientific classification
- Domain: Eukaryota
- Kingdom: Animalia
- Phylum: Arthropoda
- Subphylum: Myriapoda
- Class: Diplopoda
- Order: Siphonophorida
- Family: Siphonophoridae
- Genus: Gonatotrichus; Attems, 1951

Species
- Gonatotrichus minutus; Gonatotrichus silhouettensis

= Gonatotrichus =

Genus of millipedes

Gonatotrichus is a genus of millipedes in the order Siphonophorida, described in 1951 by Carl Attems. Two species are known, G. minutus from Malacca, Malaysia, and G. silhouettensis from Seychelles.
