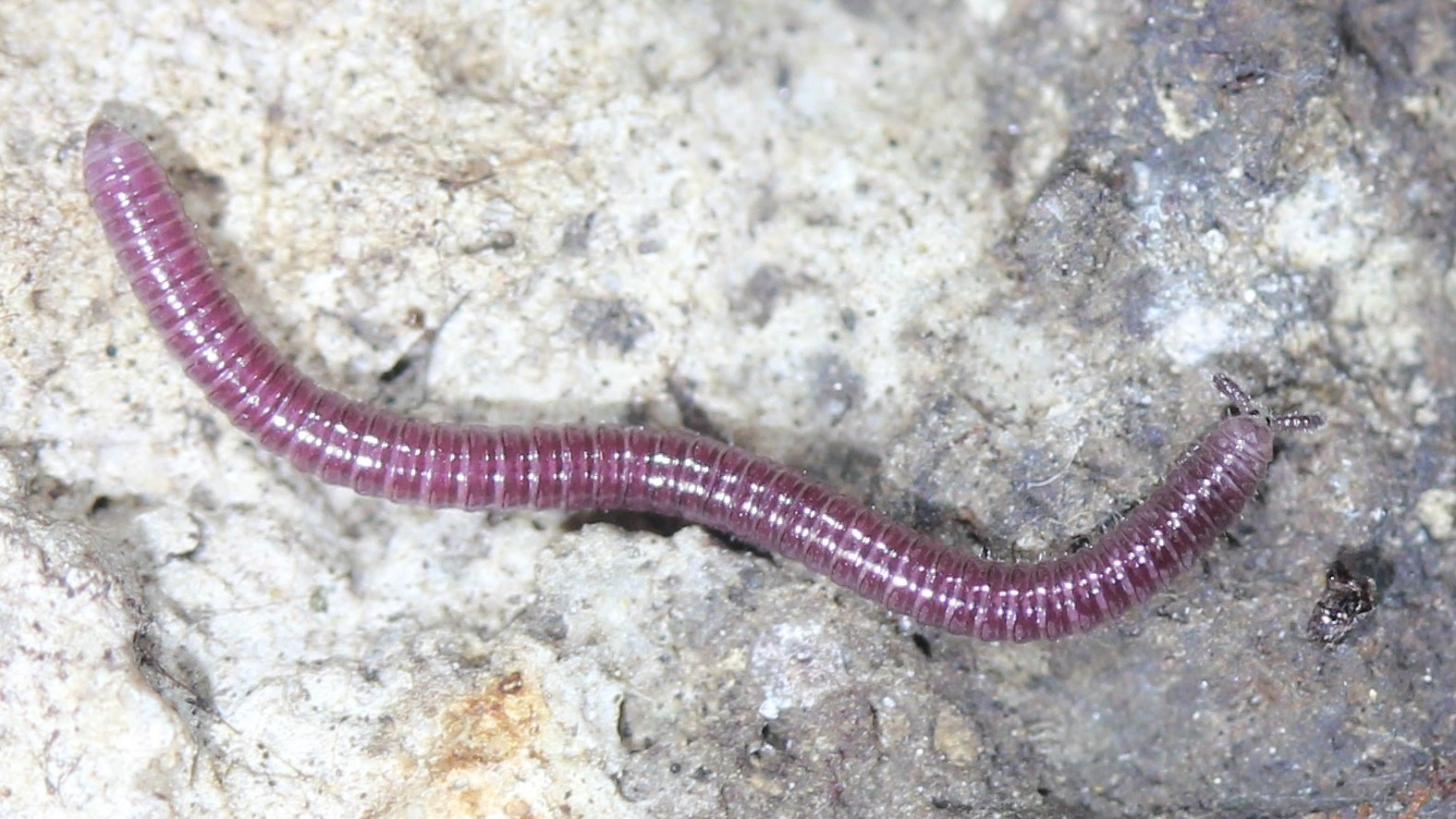
- Rhinotus purpureus

Scientific classification
- Kingdom: Animalia
- Phylum: Arthropoda
- Subphylum: Myriapoda
- Class: Diplopoda
- Order: Polyzoniida
- Family: Siphonotidae
- Genus: Rhinotus; Cook, 1896

= Rhinotus =

Genus of millipedes

Rhinotus is a genus of millipedes in the family Siphonotidae. There are at least 20 described species of the family Rhinotus.

== Species ==
These species belong to the genus Rhinotus:

- Rhinotus acuticonus (Attems, 1910)
- Rhinotus albifrons Mauriès, 1980^{c g}
- Rhinotus angulifer (Chamberlin, 1940)^{i}
- Rhinotus bivittatus (Pocock, 1898)^{c g}
- Rhinotus celebensis Carl, 1912^{c g}
- Rhinotus centralis (Chamberlin, 1940)^{i}
- Rhinotus crassiceps (Attems, 1900)
- Rhinotus demfiuranus Carl, 1912^{g}
- Rhinotus dempuranus Carl, 1912^{c g}
- Rhinotus densepilosus Golovatch & Korsós, 1992^{c g}
- Rhinotus ducalis Carl, 1926^{c g}
- Rhinotus hicksoni (Pocock, 1894)^{c g}
- Rhinotus hispidus Carl, 1926^{c g}
- Rhinotus mjoebergi Verhoeff, 1924^{c g}
- Rhinotus modestus Carl, 1926^{c g}
- Rhinotus panamanus (Loomis, 1964)^{i}
- Rhinotus purpureus (Pocock, 1894)^{i c g b}
- Rhinotus trichocephalus Carl, 1912^{c g}
- Rhinotus vanmoli Mauriès, 1980^{c g}
- Rhinotus variabilis Attems, 1930^{c g}

Data sources: i = ITIS, c = Catalogue of Life, g = GBIF, b = Bugguide.net
