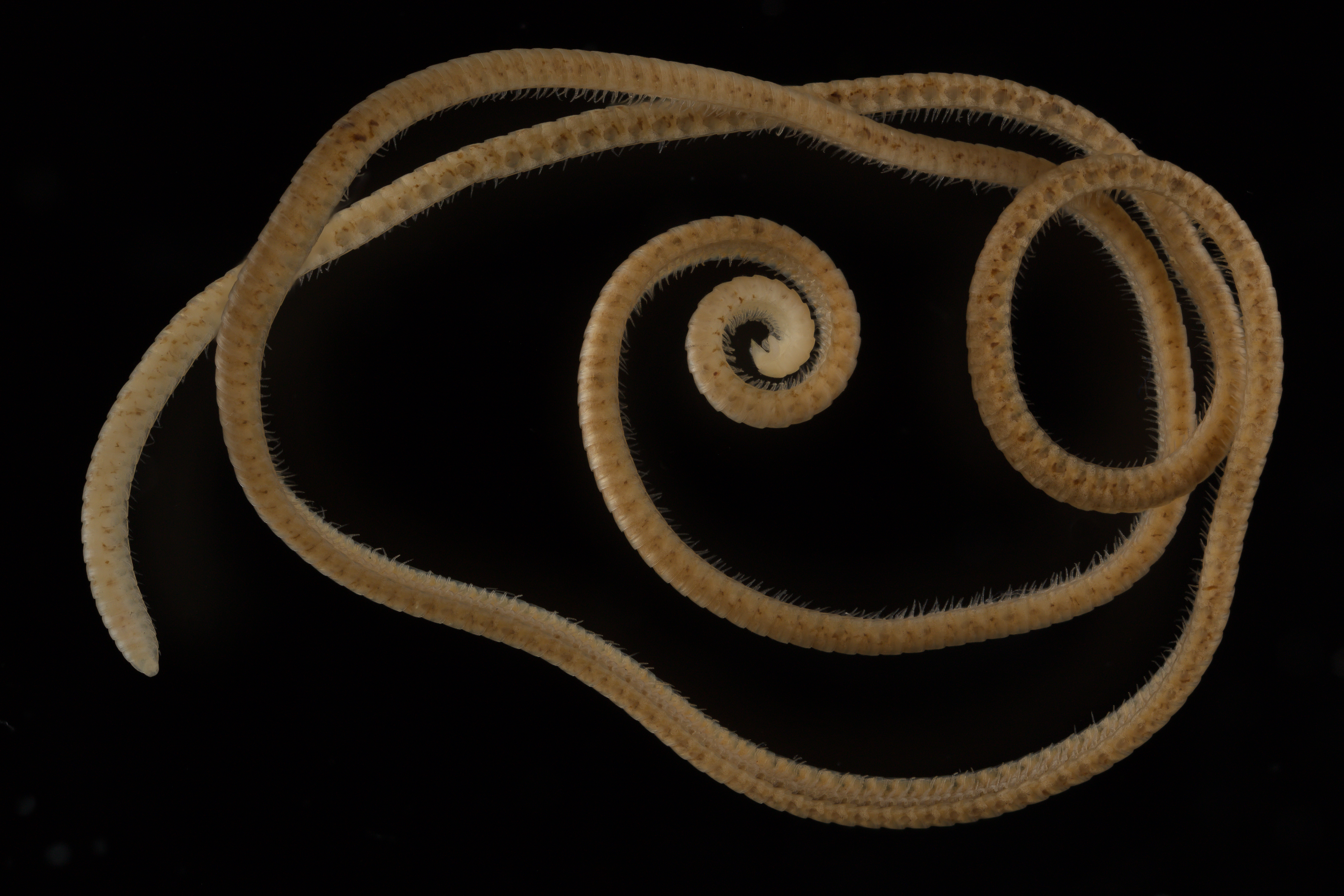
- A female with 330 body segments and 1,306 legs

Scientific classification
- Kingdom: Animalia
- Phylum: Arthropoda
- Subphylum: Myriapoda
- Class: Diplopoda
- Order: Polyzoniida
- Family: Siphonotidae
- Genus: Eumillipes; Marek, 2021
- Species: E. persephone

Binomial name
- Eumillipes persephone Marek, 2021

= Eumillipes =

Genus of millipede

Eumillipes is a genus of millipede in the family Siphonotidae. This genus contains a single species, Eumillipes persephone, known from the Eastern Goldfields of Western Australia. This millipede can have as many as 1,306 legs, which makes this species the animal with the most legs on Earth and the first millipede discovered to have 1,000 legs or more.

== Discovery ==
This genus and its type species was first described in 2021 by a team led by the American myriapodologist Paul E. Marek of Virginia Tech. The original description of this species is based on specimens discovered in drill holes bored by mining companies searching for minerals in the Great Western Woodlands of Australia. These companies hire environmental consultants to study the impact of mining on wildlife. As one of these consultants, the biologist Bruno A. Buzatto lowered traps baited with damp leaf litter into drill holes and retrieved eight specimens, including a male holotype, three adult paratypes (two female and one male), and three juveniles. These specimens were collected from three drill holes at depths ranging from 15 meters (50 ft) to 60 meters (200 ft). Five specimens were collected from 60 meters underground, including a female paratype with 1,306 legs, discovered in August 2020. The type specimens are deposited in the Western Australian Museum in Perth, Australia.

== Etymology ==
The genus name Eumillipes comes from Ancient Greek εὖ (eû), meaning "true", Latin mīlle, meaning "thousand", and pēs, meaning "foot", and thus, "true thousand feet". As the first millipede discovered with more than 1,000 legs, this millipede's name is an aptronym. This in contrast to other millipedes, which have fewer than 1,000 legs. The specific name persephone is a reference to the Greek goddess of the same name, who was the queen of the underworld, alluding to the subterranean lifestyle of this millipede.

== Description ==
This species is uniformly pale and cream-colored, with a highly elongated body, only about 1 mm (0.039 in) in diameter, but reaching up to 95.7 mm (3.8 in) in length. This millipede has a cone-shaped head and unusually large, thick antennae, but has no eyes. The male specimens range from 198 to 208 segments and from 778 to 818 legs. The female specimens have more segments and legs, ranging from 253 to 330 segments and from 998 to 1,306 legs.

The elongated shape, large number of legs, and eyeless condition of this species is convergent with the distantly related Illacme plenipes of North America, the previous record holder for maximum number of legs, with up to 750 legs. The force of many legs, a flexible body, and an extensible trunk with compressible unfused rings help E. persephone squeeze through narrow crevices underground. Together with the movement of many legs, longitudinal and oblique muscles pull the rings together, which facilitates locomotion.

With an elongated shape, thin body, and no eyes, this species differs from most members of the order Polyzoniida. Members of that order are usually shorter, with fewer legs and flatter dome-shaped bodies. An analysis of the genome of this millipede, however, places this species in the order Polyzoniida based on a determination of the most recent common ancestor.

The diet and lifestyle details for this millipede are unknown. Biologists suspect that this species, like others in the family Siphonotidae may feed on fungi growing on plant roots. A long trunk may help these millipedes subsist in a resource-limited underground habitat by providing a long digestive canal that can absorb more nutrients from a sparse diet.

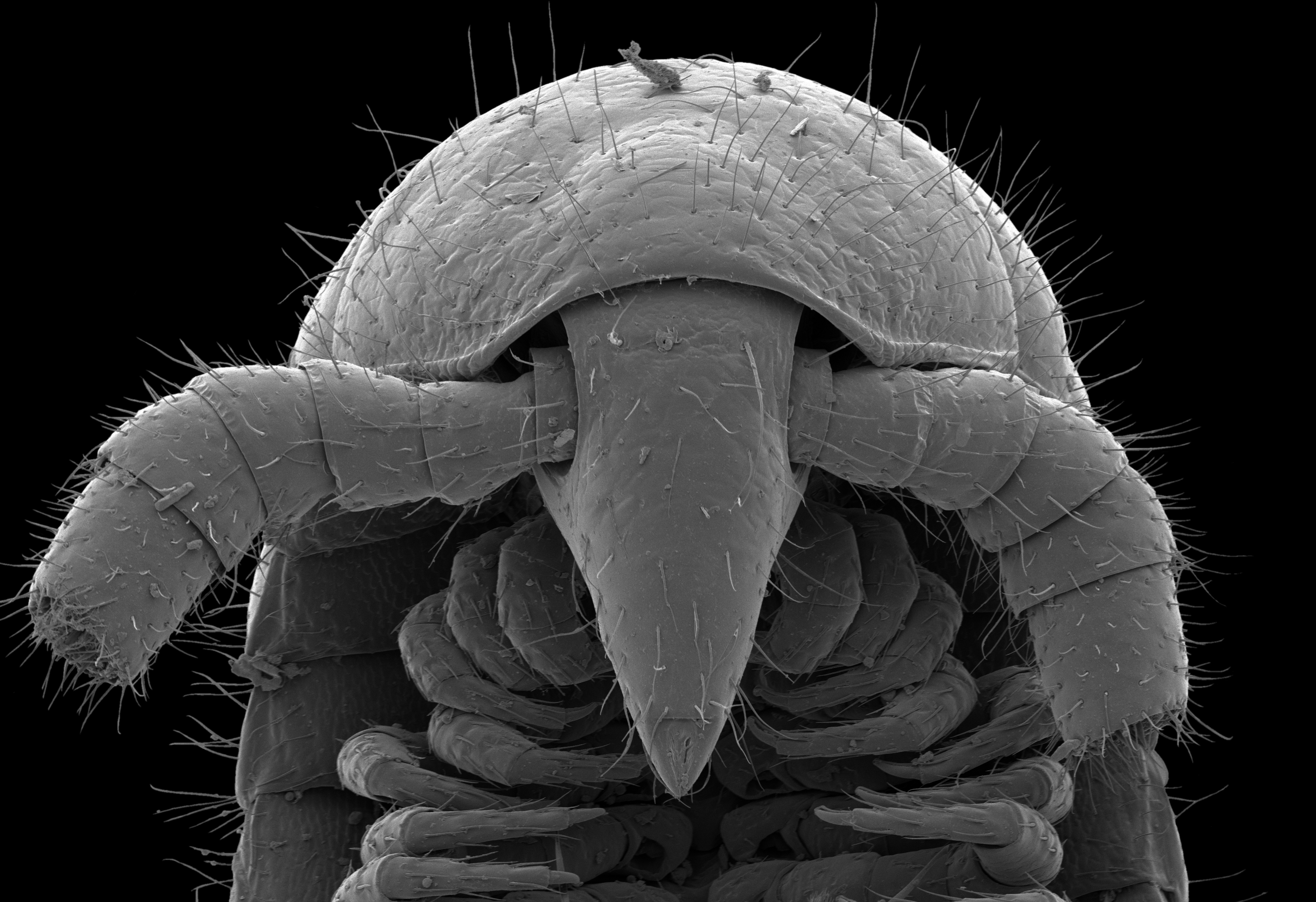
Head of E. persephone

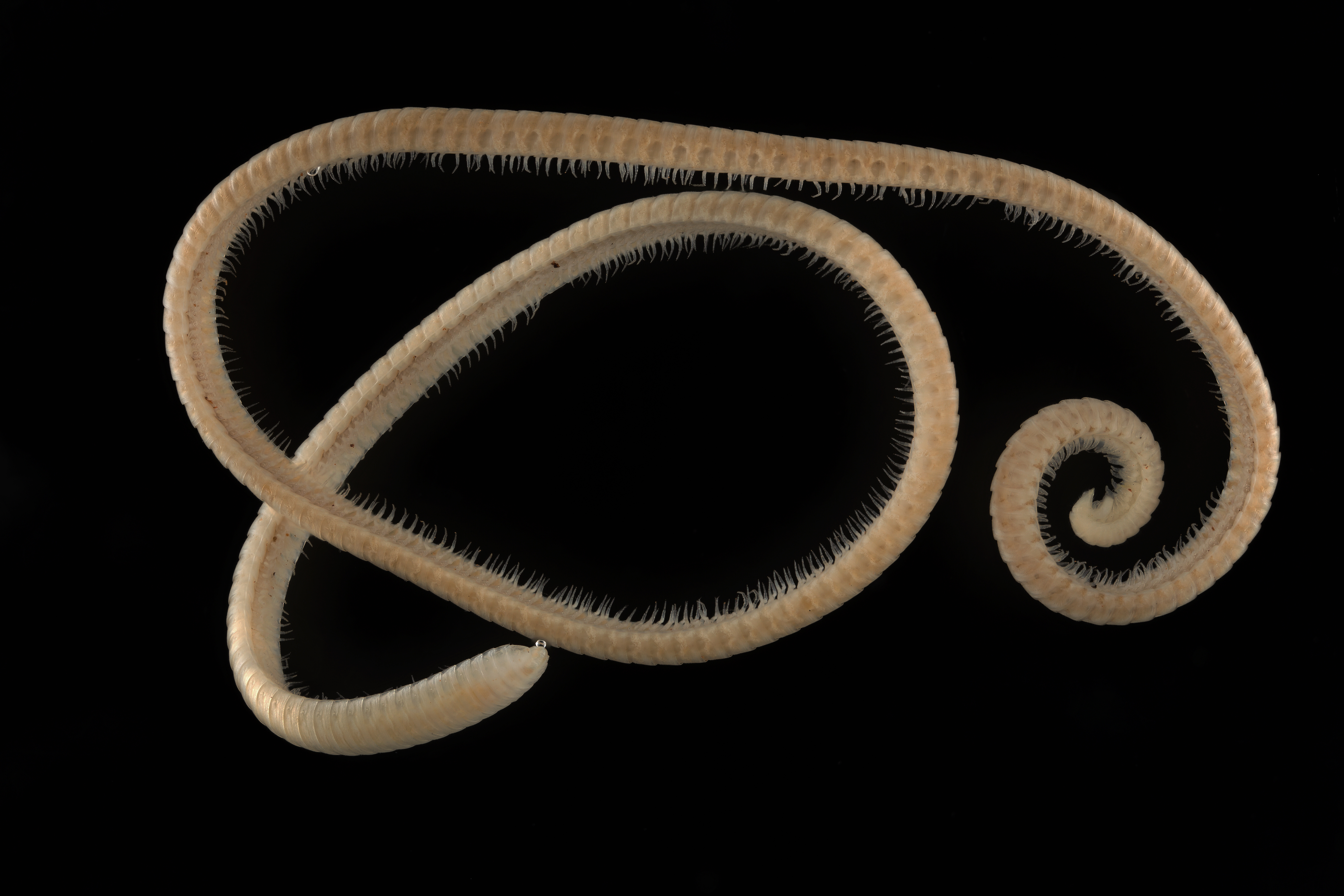
E. persephone, male, with 818 legs

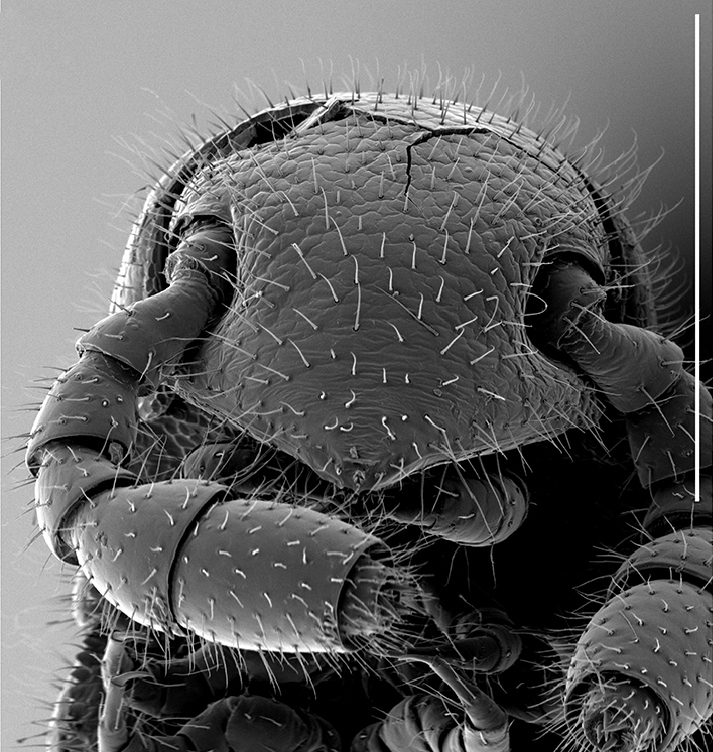
Head of I. plenipes

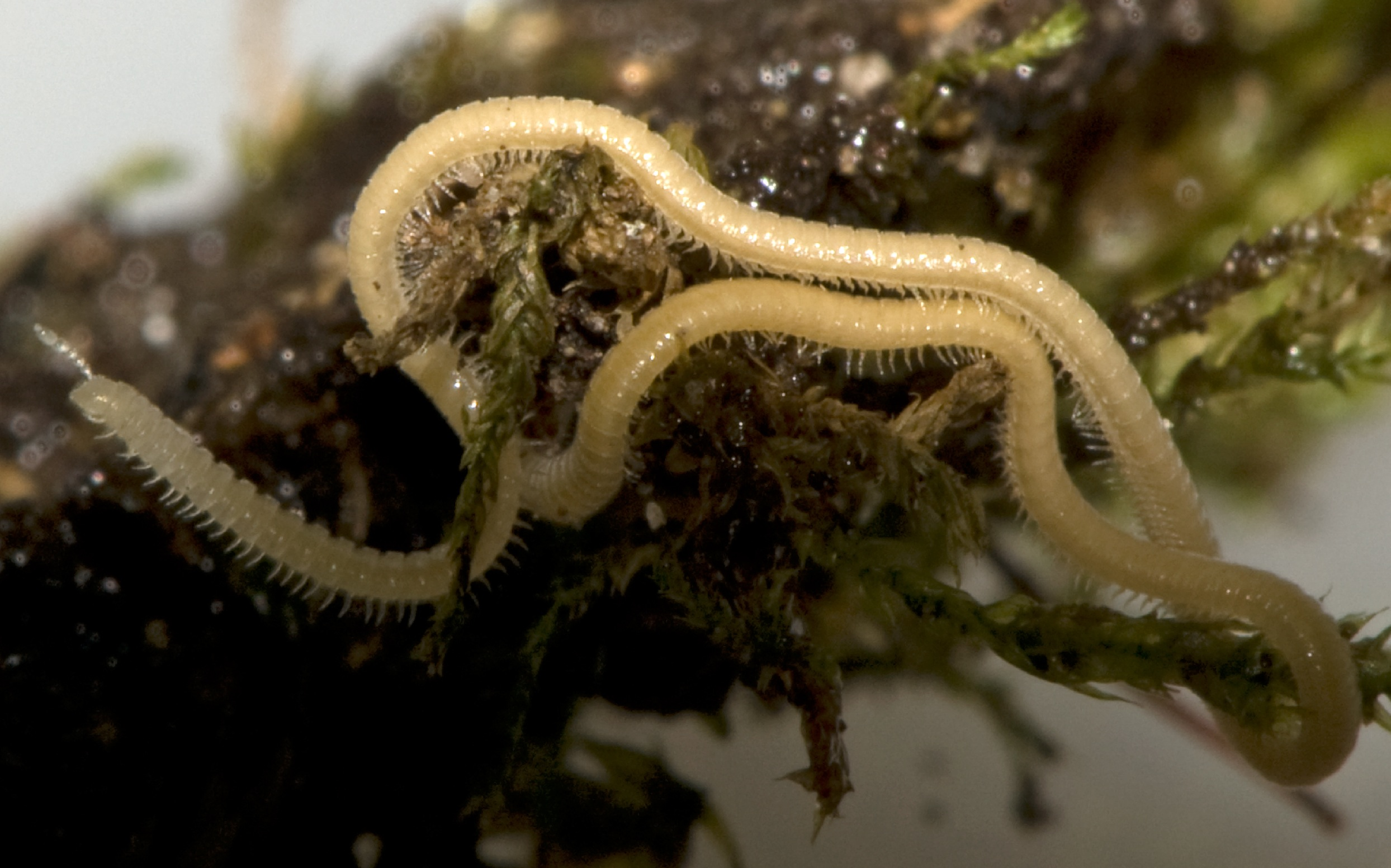
I. plenipes with 618 legs

== Conservation ==
This species was discovered under 60 meters of semiarid desert soil in a resource-rich area and is threatened by surface mining.
