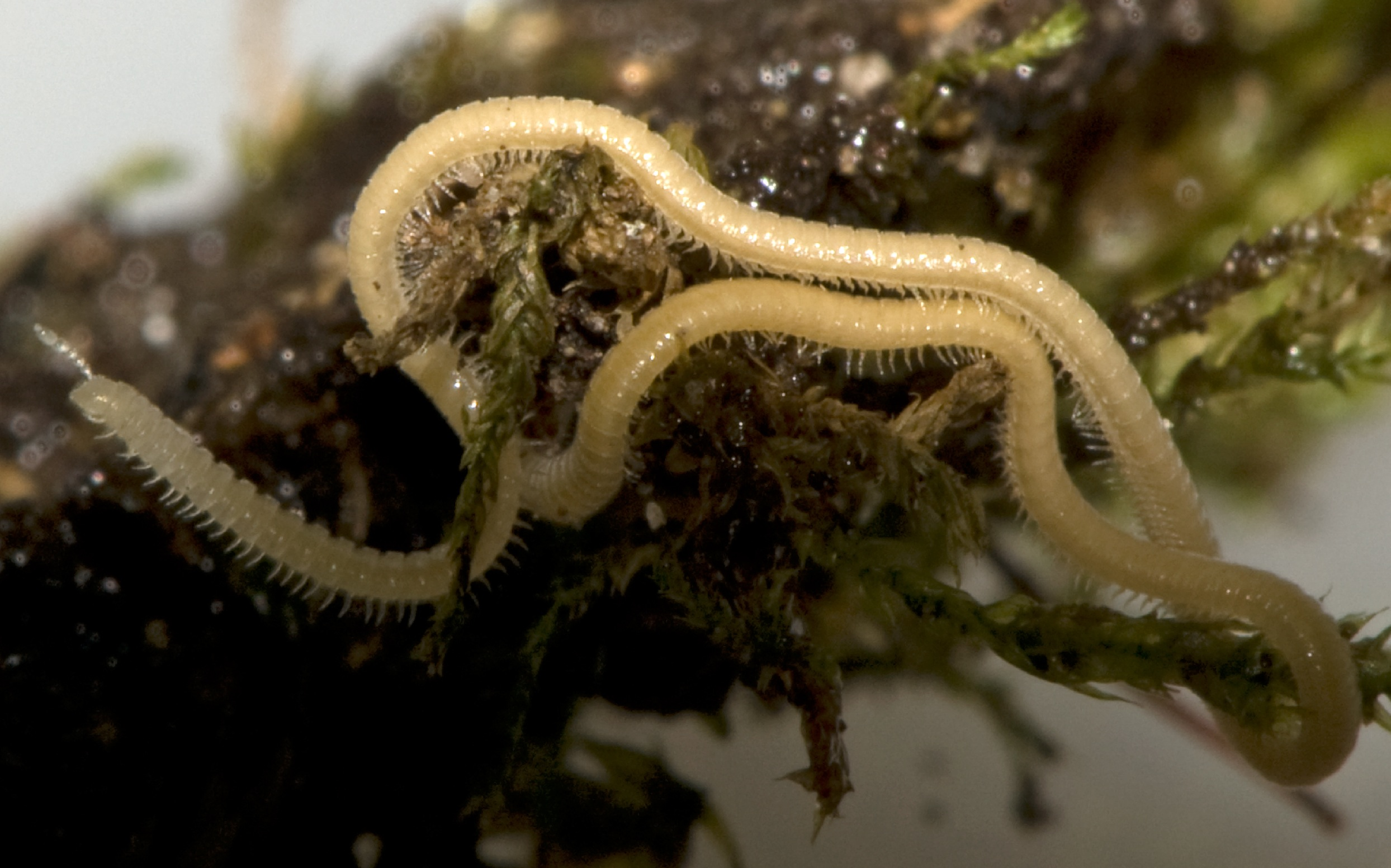
- A female Illacme plenipes with 618 legs

Scientific classification
- Kingdom: Animalia
- Phylum: Arthropoda
- Subphylum: Myriapoda
- Class: Diplopoda
- Order: Siphonophorida
- Family: Siphonorhinidae
- Genus: Illacme; Cook & Loomis, 1928

Species
- Illacme plenipes Cook & Loomis, 1928; Illacme tobini Marek, Shear & Krejca, 2016; Illacme socal Marek & Shear, 2023

= Illacme =

Genus of millipedes

Illacme is a genus of millipedes in the family Siphonorhinidae. This genus includes three species. All three species are found in California. This genus is notable for including the species I. plenipes, which can have as many as 192 segments and 750 legs, establishing this millipede as the species with the second most legs in the animal kingdom.

== Discovery and distribution ==
This genus was first described in 1928 by the American biologists Orator F. Cook and Harold F. Loomis. They proposed this genus to contain the newly discovered species I. plenipes, which they simultaneously described and explicitly designated as the type species. They based their descriptions of this genus and its type species on numerous specimens collected by Cook in 1926 from San Benito County, California. The male holotype is deposited in the Smithsonian Institution in Washington, D.C. This species was not seen in the wild again until this millipede was rediscovered in the northwestern Gabilan foothills near its type locality in 2005.

In 2016, the biologists Paul E. Marek, Jean K. Krejca, and William A. Shear described I. tobini as a new species in the same genus. They based the original description of this species on a single male specimen collected by Krejca in 2006 from Lange Cave in Sequoia National Park in Tulare County, California, 240 km (150 mi) east of the known range for I. plenipes. The holotype is deposited in the Virginia Tech Insect Collection in Blacksburg, Virginia.

In 2023, a team of biologists including Marek and Shear described I. socal as the third species in this genus. They based the original description of this species on specimens discovered in 2018 in Whiting Ranch Wilderness Park in the city of Lake Forest in Orange County, California. The male holotype is deposited in the Virginia Tech Insect Collection.

== Phylogeny ==
A phylogenetic analysis of colobognath millipedes based on molecular data places this genus in a clade with the genus Nematozonium. These two genera emerge as sister groups to one another in a phylogenetic tree of these millipedes. Similarities in morphology also suggest that the genus Nematozonium contains the closest relatives of the genus Illacme. Unlike the New World genus Illacme, specimens of the genus Nematozonium are found in southern Africa, suggesting that the current ranges of these close relatives are remnants of a much broader distribution of an ancestral population across tropical Pangaea, an ancient distribution dating from before this supercontinent broke up more than 200 million years ago.

== Description ==
Millipedes in the genus Illacme can reach 40.4 mm in length and feature as many as 192 segments (counting the collum but excluding the telson) and 750 legs, the numbers found on a female specimen of I. plenipes. Most specimens, however, feature far fewer segments and correspondingly fewer legs. Adults have been recorded with 84 to 192 segments. These millipedes are long and slender like threads, reaching no more than 0.64 mm in width, and pale like cream.

The head is shaped like a pear or triangle, and each of the antennae features a bend like an elbow between the third and fourth segments. The second segment of each antenna is longer than wide and longer than every other segment except the sixth, which is the longest segment. The sixth segment of each antenna is cylindrical rather than distinctly bulging. The antennae lack the sensory pits observed on the fifth and sixth segments of the antennae of some other millipedes in the same family. Instead, sensilla are arranged in rows on the distal margins of the fifth and sixth segments of the antennae.

Each of the gonopods features seven segments. The distal end of each anterior gonopod features four to eight spines as well as a blunt claw (tarsungulum) shaped like a spade. The distal end of each posterior gonopod divides into three to five branches. One branch is pointed like a spike, but each of the other branches is serrated like a saw at the distal end.

Millipedes in this genus exhibit many of the traits that characterize the family Siphonorhinidae. For example, the head is shaped like a pear or triangle, and each antenna bends like an elbow between the third and fourth segments. Furthermore, the second segment of the antennae is elongated, and the terminal segment of the posterior gonopod divides into branches.

Millipedes in the genus Illacme share a more distinctive set of traits with their close relatives in the genus Nematozonium. For example, millipedes in both of these genera feature long and slender bodies. Furthermore, in both genera, the antennae lack sensory pits on the fifth and sixth segments, and the sixth segment of the antennae is cylindrical rather than distinctly bulging.

These closely related genera can be distinguished, however, based on other traits. For example, the terminal segment of each of the posterior gonopods divides into two to four branches that are each serrated at the distal end and one other branch shaped like a spike in Illacme but divides into two pointed branches and a distinctly smaller spine in Nematozonium. Furthermore, each of the gonopods features seven segments in Illacme but only six segments in Nematozonium. Moreover, sensilla are arranged in rows on the distal margins of the fifth and sixth segments of the antennae in Illacme, but these sensilla are not evident in Nematozonium.
