= Nematozonium =

Scientific classification
- Kingdom: Animalia
- Phylum: Arthropoda
- Subphylum: Myriapoda
- Class: Diplopoda
- Order: Siphonophorida
- Family: Siphonorhinidae
- Genus: Nematozonium; Verhoeff, 1939
- Species: N. filum

Binomial name
- Nematozonium filum Verhoeff, 1939

Genus of millipede

Nematozonium is a monotypic genus of millipede in the family Siphonorhinidae. The only species in this genus is Nematozonium filum. This millipede is found in South Africa. This species is notable for including a specimen with 182 segments and 710 legs, which establishes this millipede as the species with the fifth most legs in the animal kingdom.

== Discovery ==
This genus and its only species were first described in 1939 by the German zoologist Karl W. Verhoeff. He based this description on specimens found at an elevation of 1,930 meters on Cathkin Peak on the Drakensberg escarpment in the province of KwaZulu-Natal in South Africa. The type specimens, including one syntype of each sex, are deposited in the Zoologische Staatssammlung München in Munich.

== Taxonomy ==
In 1939, Verhoeff originally proposed a monotypic family, Nematozoniidae, to contain this genus. In 2003, however, the American zoologist Rowland M. Shelley deemed Nematozoniidae to be a junior synonym of Siphonorhinidae. Accordingly, authorities now place this genus in the family Siphonorhinidae.

In 1940, Verhoeff described Nematozonium elongatissimum as a new species in this genus. He based the original description of this millipede on a female holotype found in the town of Bulwer in the South African province of KwaZulu-Natal. The holotype is deposited in the Zoologische Staatssammlung München. In 2004, however, Shelley and the American zoologist Richard L. Hoffman deemed N. elongatissimum to be a junior synonym of N. filum. Accordingly, authorities now regard these millipedes as the same species.

== Distribution ==
Since the discovery of the type specimens on Cathkin Peak and in Bulwer in the province of KwaZulu-Natal, this millipede has been found in other localities in South Africa. For example, this species has been recorded elsewhere in the Drakensberg mountains, including Cathedral Peak and Champagne Castle, in the province of KwaZulu-Natal. This millipede has also been recorded in Pietermaritzburg and in the Dlinza Forest Nature Reserve near Eshowe, both sites in the province of KwaZulu-Natal. This species has also been recorded in the towns of Graskop and Barberton in the South African province of Mpumalanga. This disjunct distribution with records from two regions about 550 km from one another suggests that the population may span the area in between, possibly including Eastern Cape province of South Africa, Lesotho, and Eswatini.

== Ecology ==
The records of this millipede place its range in the Maputaland-Pondoland-Albany biodiversity hotspot. All records for this millipede are from Afromontane forests. Authorities consider this species a soil-dwelling millipede that probably requires moist forested biotopes. At least one specimen was found beneath a log in a coastal scarp forest.

== Phylogeny ==
A phylogenetic analysis of colobognath millipedes based on molecular data places this genus in a clade with species of the genus Illacme forming a sister group. Similarities in morphology also suggest that the genus Illacme contains the closest relatives of the genus Nematozonium. Unlike the African genus Nematozonium, species of Illacme are found in the Western Hemisphere, suggesting that the current ranges of these close relatives are remnants of a much broader distribution of an ancestral population across tropical Pangaea, an ancient distribution dating from before this supercontinent broke up more than 200 million years ago.

== Description ==
The species N. filum can feature as many as 182 segments and 355 pairs of legs. Most specimens, however, feature far fewer segments and correspondingly fewer legs. Specimens have been recorded with 25 to 182 segments. The last two body segments lack legs. This millipede ranges from white to a pale yellowish cream color. This millipede can reach about 30 mm in length but is slender like a thread, reaching only about 0.5 mm in width.

The head is shaped like a rounded triangle or pear, and each of the antennae features a bend like an elbow. The second segment of each antenna is longer than wide and longer than adjacent segments, but the sixth segment is the longest and broadest. The sixth segment is cylindrical rather than distinctly bulging. The antennae lack the sensory pits observed on the fifth and sixth segments of the antennae of some other millipedes in the same family.

Each of the gonopods features six segments. The penultimate segment on each of the anterior gonopods features hairy lobes projecting from the distal margin, and the ultimate segment features broadly rounded lobes at the distal end, which are separated from the proximal half of the segment by indentations forming a waist in the middle. The terminal segment of each of the posterior gonopods divides at the distal end into two short branches, one dorsal and one ventral. Each branch is curved and tapers to a point at the tip. A smaller curved spine projects from the middle of the ventral branch.

This millipede exhibits many of the traits that characterize the family Siphonorhinidae. For example, the head is shaped like a rounded triangle or pear, and each antenna bends like an elbow. Furthermore, the second segment of the antennae is elongated, and the terminal segment of the posterior gonopod divides into branches.

Millipedes in the genus Nematozonium share a more distinctive set of traits with their close relatives in the genus Illacme. For example, millipedes in both of these genera feature long and slender bodies. Furthermore, in both genera, the antennae lack sensory pits on the fifth and sixth segments, and the sixth segment of the antennae is cylindrical rather than distinctly bulging.

These closely related genera can be distinguished, however, based on other traits. For example, the terminal segment of each of the posterior gonopods divides into two pointed branches and a distinctly smaller spine in Nematozonium but divides into two to four branches that are each serrated like a saw at the distal end and one other branch shaped like a spike in Illacme. Furthermore, each of the gonopods features seven segments in Illacme but only six segments in Nematozonium. Moreover, sensilla are arranged in rows on the distal margins of the fifth and sixth segments of the antennae in Illacme, but these sensilla are not evident in Nematozonium.
