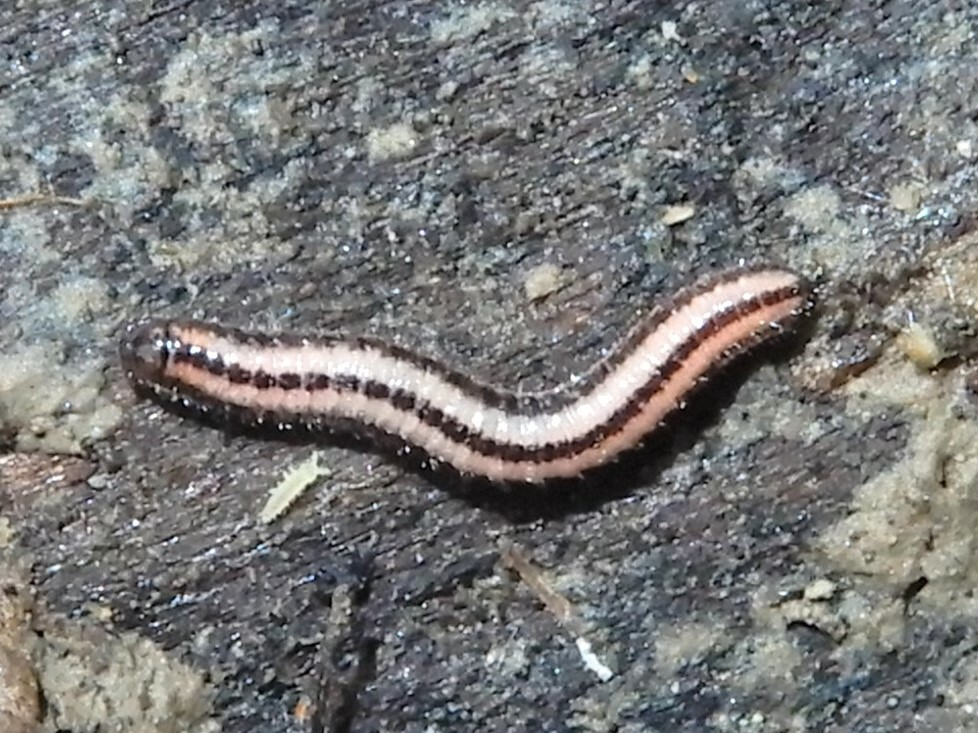

Scientific classification
- Kingdom: Animalia
- Phylum: Arthropoda
- Subphylum: Myriapoda
- Class: Diplopoda
- Order: Polyzoniida
- Family: Siphonotidae; Cook, 1895

= Siphonotidae =

Family of millipedes

Siphonotidae is a family of millipedes in the order Polyzoniida. This family includes more than 70 species distributed among 13 genera. These millipedes are found in South America, South Africa, Madagascar, Southeast Asia, Australia and New Zealand.

== Description ==
Millipedes in this family have a narrow telson and are quick and active. The male gonopore is located behind the second leg pair. The most distal (sixth) segment of each leg features an accessory claw.

== Genera ==
This family includes the following genera:

- Bdellotus Cook, 1895
- Burinia Attems, 1926
- Cylichnogaster Verhoeff, 1937
- Eumillipes Marek, 2021
- Metriozonium Attems, 1951
- Rhinotus Cook, 1896
- Rhynchomecogaster Verhoeff, 1937
- Siphonethus Chamberlin, 1920
- Siphonoconus Attems, 1930
- Siphonothinus Silvestri, 1903
- Siphonotus Brandt, 1837
- Theratta Anilkumar, Wesener & Moritz, 2022
- Upsima Chamberlin, 1945

Orsilochus is a taxonomic synonym of Rhinotus.
