= Siphonophora (millipede) =

Scientific classification
- Kingdom: Animalia
- Phylum: Arthropoda
- Subphylum: Myriapoda
- Class: Diplopoda
- Order: Siphonophorida
- Family: Siphonophoridae
- Genus: Siphonophora; Brandt, 1837

Genus of myriapods

Siphonophora is a genus of millipedes belonging to the family Siphonophoridae.

The genus has almost cosmopolitan distribution.

Species:

- Siphonophora albiceps Loomis, 1970
- Siphonophora alveata Loomis, 1972
- Siphonophora andecola Kraus, 1954
- Siphonophora atopa Chamberlin, 1920
- Siphonophora aviceps Loomis, 1961
- Siphonophora barberi Chamberlin, 1922
- Siphonophora brevicornis Pocock, 1910
- Siphonophora coatochira Attems, 1838
- Siphonophora coclensis Loomis, 1964
- Siphonophora coctensis Loomis
- Siphonophora columbianum Carl, 1914
- Siphonophora compacta Loomis, 1975
- Siphonophora coniceps Attems, 1936
- Siphonophora conicornis Chamberlin, 1952
- Siphonophora cornuta Pocock, 1910
- Siphonophora costaricae Chamberlin, 1914
- Siphonophora cubana Karsch, 1887
- Siphonophora duschman Golovatch, 1991
- Siphonophora duse Chamberlin, 1920
- Siphonophora dux Chamberlin, 1920
- Siphonophora fallens Chamberlin, 1922
- Siphonophora feae Pocock, 1893
- Siphonophora felix Silvestri, 1898
- Siphonophora festae Silvestri, 1898
- Siphonophora filiformis Mauriès, 1980
- Siphonophora flaviceps Pocock, 1894
- Siphonophora graciliceps Chamberlin, 1923
- Siphonophora gracilior Chamberlin, 1918
- Siphonophora guianana Chamberlin, 1923
- Siphonophora hartii (Pocock, 1895)
- Siphonophora hebetunguis (Attems, 1951)
- Siphonophora hoffmani Santiago-Blay & Poinar, 1992
- Siphonophora humberti Pocock, 1892
- Siphonophora lafloridae Kraus, 1955
- Siphonophora larwoodi Turk, 1947
- Siphonophora limitare Loomis, 1936
- Siphonophora lineata Peters, 1864
- Siphonophora longirostris Silvestri, 1894
- Siphonophora loriae Silvestri, 1895
- Siphonophora luteola (Gervais & Goudot, 1844)
- Siphonophora luzoniensis Peters, 1864
- Siphonophora manni Chamberlin, 1912
- Siphonophora margaritafera Kraus, 1957
- Siphonophora margaritifera Kraus, 1957
- Siphonophora media Chamberlin, 1920
- Siphonophora meinerti Silvestri, 1898
- Siphonophora millepeda Loomis, 1934
- Siphonophora minuta Carl, 1922
- Siphonophora modiglianii Silvestri, 1895
- Siphonophora montana Loomis, 1964
- Siphonophora monzonica Kraus, 1960
- Siphonophora nansoriana Chamberlin, 1920
- Siphonophora nigrosignata Silvestri, 1898
- Siphonophora obscurior Chamberlin, 1920
- Siphonophora panamensis Loomis, 1961
- Siphonophora parvula Loomis, 1964
- Siphonophora paulista Schubart, 1945
- Siphonophora paulistus Schubart, 1945
- Siphonophora platops Loomis, 1941
- Siphonophora porcullae Kraus, 1954
- Siphonophora portoricensis Brandt, 1837
- Siphonophora progressor (Chamberlin, 1922)
- Siphonophora proxima Chamberlin, 1918
- Siphonophora pubescens Schubart, 1947
- Siphonophora relicta Chamberlin, 1923
- Siphonophora robusta Chamberlin, 1918
- Siphonophora rosacea Loomis, 1972
- Siphonophora sabachana (Chamberlin, 1938)
- Siphonophora scolopacina Silvestri, 1895
- Siphonophora senaria (Loomis, 1937)
- Siphonophora setaepromissa Read & Enghoff, 2019
- Siphonophora silhouettensis (Mauriès, 1980)
- Siphonophora spinosa Takakawa, 1954
- Siphonophora taenioides Silvestri, 1898
- Siphonophora takashimai Takashima, 1942
- Siphonophora telana (Chamberlin, 1922)
- Siphonophora tenuicornis Pocock, 1894
- Siphonophora texascolens Chamberlin & Mulaik, 1941
- Siphonophora tobagoana Chamberlin, 1918
- Siphonophora trifini Kraus, 1954
- Siphonophora tuberculata Read & Enghoff, 2019
- Siphonophora velezi Santiago-Blay & Poinar, 1992
- Siphonophora vera Chamberlin, 1952
- Siphonophora vinosa Silvestri, 1894
- Siphonophora virescens Silvestri, 1898
- Siphonophora zelandica Chamberlin, 1920
