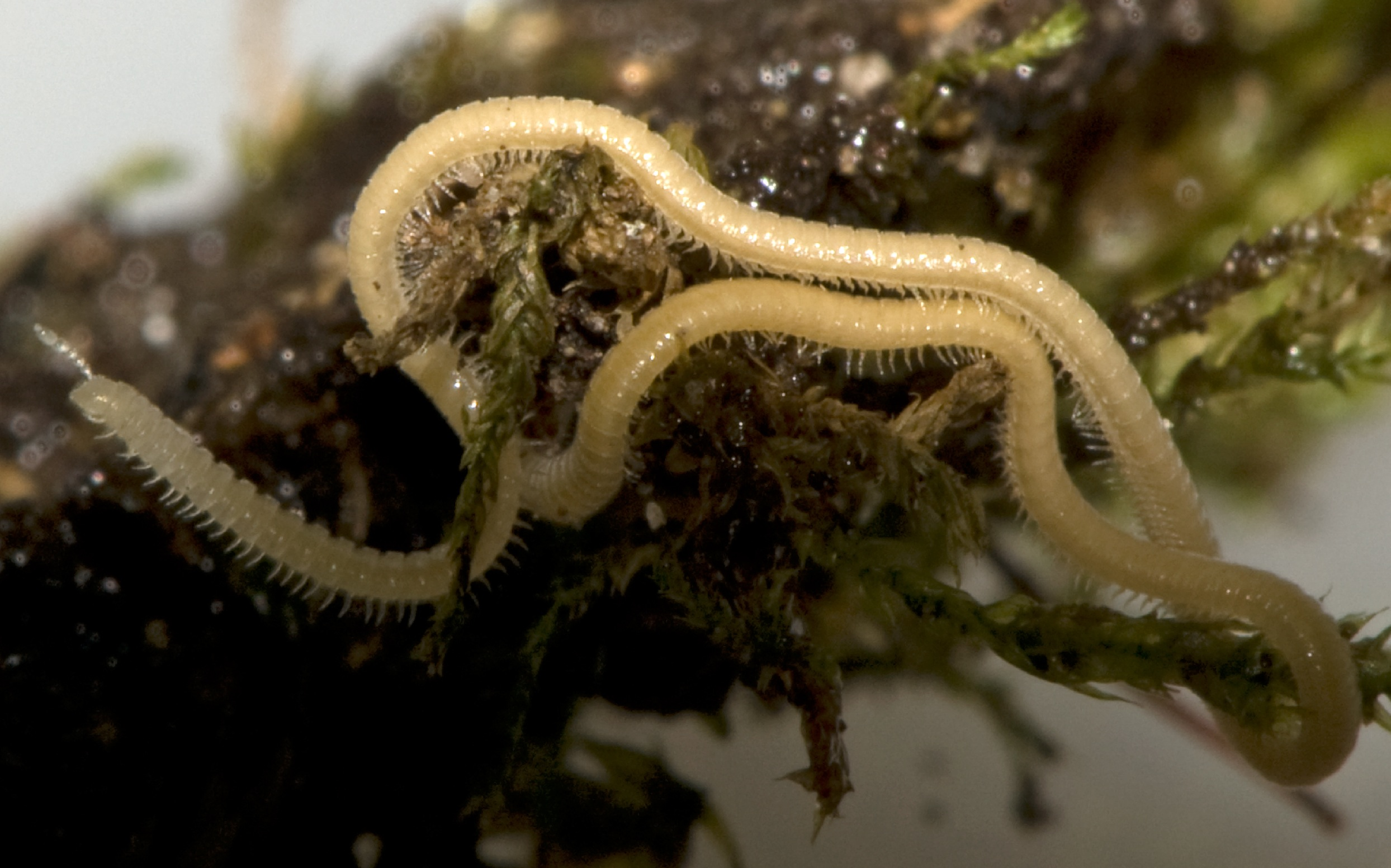
- Siphonorhinidae

Scientific classification
- Kingdom: Animalia
- Phylum: Arthropoda
- Subphylum: Myriapoda
- Class: Diplopoda
- Order: Siphonophorida
- Family: Siphonorhinidae

= Siphonorhinidae =

Family of millipedes

Siphonorhinidae is a family of millipede in the order Siphonophorida. There are at least 4 genera and about 12 described species in Siphonorhinidae.

== Genera ==
These four genera belong to the family Siphonorhinidae:

- Illacme Cook & Loomis, 1928
- Kleruchus Attems, 1938
- Nematozonium Verhoeff, 1939
- Siphonorhinus Pocock, 1894
