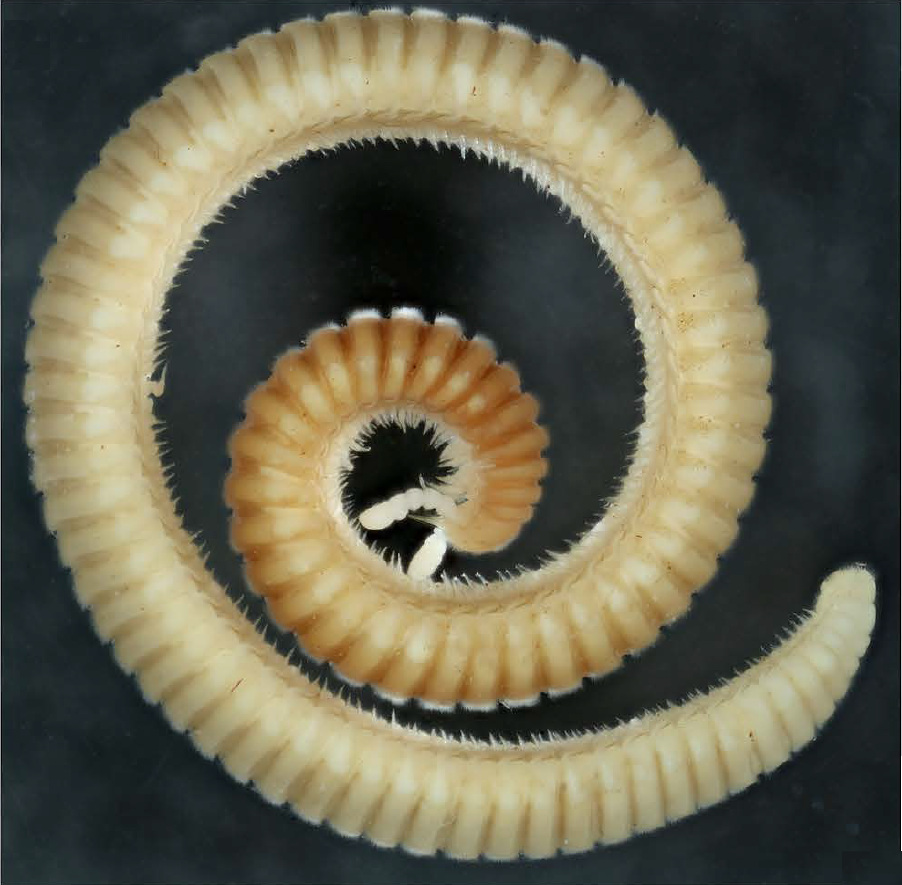
- Female Columbianum major

Scientific classification
- Kingdom: Animalia
- Phylum: Arthropoda
- Subphylum: Myriapoda
- Class: Diplopoda
- Order: Siphonophorida
- Family: Siphonophoridae; Newport, 1844

= Siphonophoridae =

Family of millipedes

Siphonophoridae is a family of millipedes in the order Siphonophorida. There are about 12 genera and more than 110 described species in Siphonophoridae.

== Genera ==
These 12 genera belong to the family Siphonophoridae:

- Bactrois Cook, 1896
- Balizonium Verhoeff, 1941
- Columbianum Verhoeff, 1941
- Gonatotrichus Attems, 1951
- Linozonium Attems, 1951
- Lomboknium Verhoeff, 1941
- Okeanozonium Verhoeff, 1941
- Pterozonium Attems, 1951
- Rhinosiphora Verhoeff, 1924
- Siphonacme Cook & Loomis, 1928
- Siphonocybe Pocock, 1903
- Siphonophora Brandt, 1837
