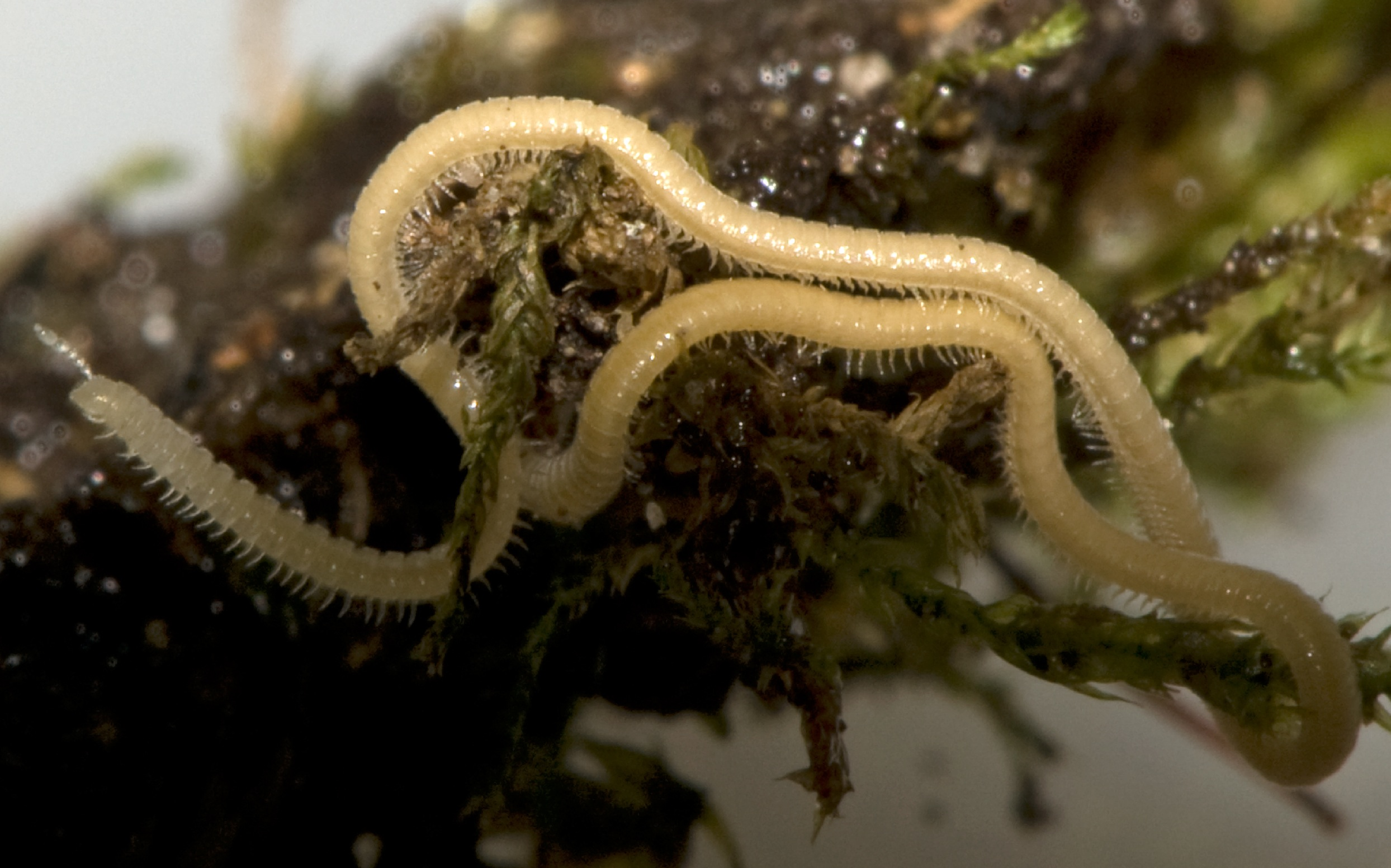
- Illacme plenipes

Scientific classification
- Kingdom: Animalia
- Phylum: Arthropoda
- Subphylum: Myriapoda
- Class: Diplopoda
- Subclass: Chilognatha
- Infraclass: Helminthomorpha
- Subterclass: Colobognatha
- Order: Siphonophorida; Newport, 1844

Families
- Siphonophoridae; Siphonorhinidae

Synonyms
- Californizoniinae Verhoeff, 1941

= Siphonophorida =

Siphonophorida Temporal range: Cenomanian–Present

Order of millipedes

Siphonophorida (Greek for "tube bearer") is an order of millipedes containing two families and over 100 species. Millipedes in this order are also known as snout millipedes.

== Description ==
Millipedes in the order Siphonophorida are long and worm-like, reaching up to 36 millimetres (1.4 in) in length and up to 190 body segments. Eyes are absent, and in many species the head is elongated into a long beak, with mandibles highly reduced. The beak may serve in a suctorial function. The body has a dense covering of fine setae. Each body segment consists of a dorsal tergite, two lateral pleurites, and ventral sternite, which are unfused. The male reproductive appendages (gonopods) are simple and leg-like, consisting of the ninth and 10th leg pairs. This lack of specialization has led to Siphonophorida being called a "taxonomist's nightmare", and Jeekel (cited in) jokingly gave the order the "taxonomists' award for least popular group among diplopods".

== Distribution ==
Siphonophorida occurs from southwestern USA to Brazil and Peru in the western hemisphere, as well as South Africa, India, southeast Asia and Australia. The oldest fossil of the group is from the Late Cretaceous (Cenomanian) aged Burmese amber, assignable to the extant genus Siphonophora.

== Classification ==
Two families are traditionally recognized. Differences between the two families include antennae and head structure: the large family Siphonophoridae, with over 100 species, has elongate beak-like mouthparts, and straight antennae with sensory pits on the fifth and sixth antennal segments ("antennomeres)". The family Siphonorhinidae, with only around 10 species, lacks the beak-like mouthparts, and has geniculate (elbowed) antennae lacking sensory pits on the fifth and sixth antennomere.

Family Siphonophoridae Newport, 1844

Head of Siphonophora barberi from Central America, showing large antennae and tubular "beak"

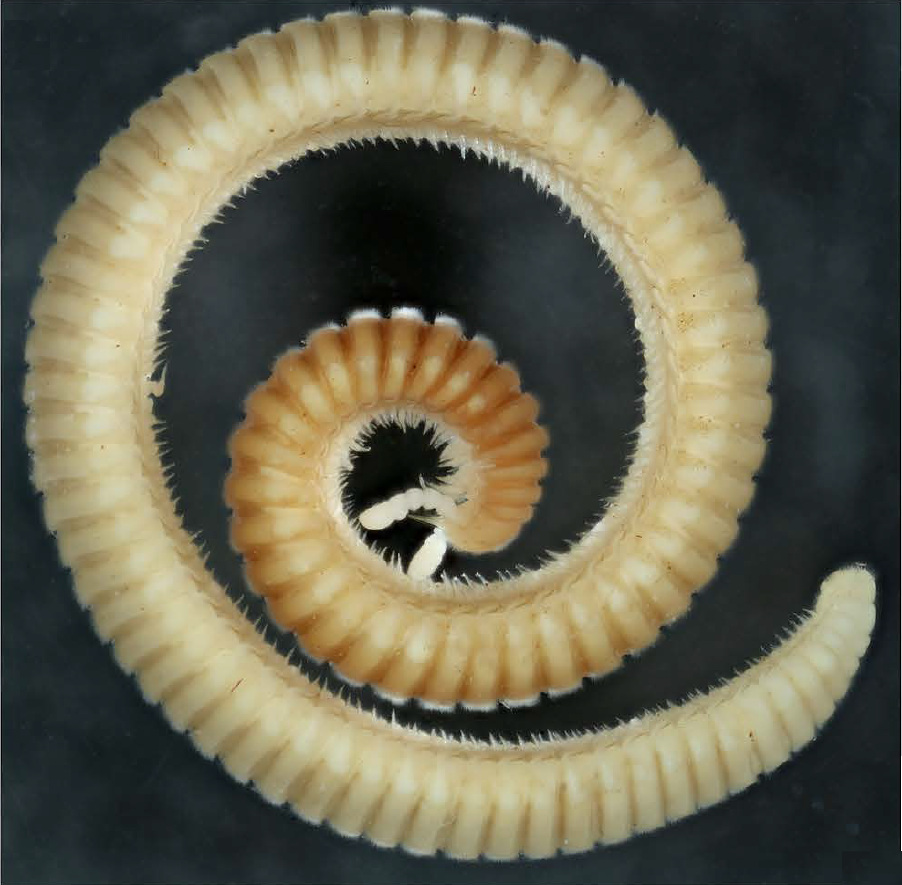
Columbianum major, Brazil

- Balizonium
- Columbianum
- Gonatotrichus
- Linozonium
- Lomboknium
- Okeanozonium
- Pterozonium
- Tugrazontium
- Rhinosiphora
- Siphonacme
- Siphonophora

Family Siphonorhinidae Cook, 1895

- Illacme
- Kleruchus
- Nematozonium
- Siphonorhinus
