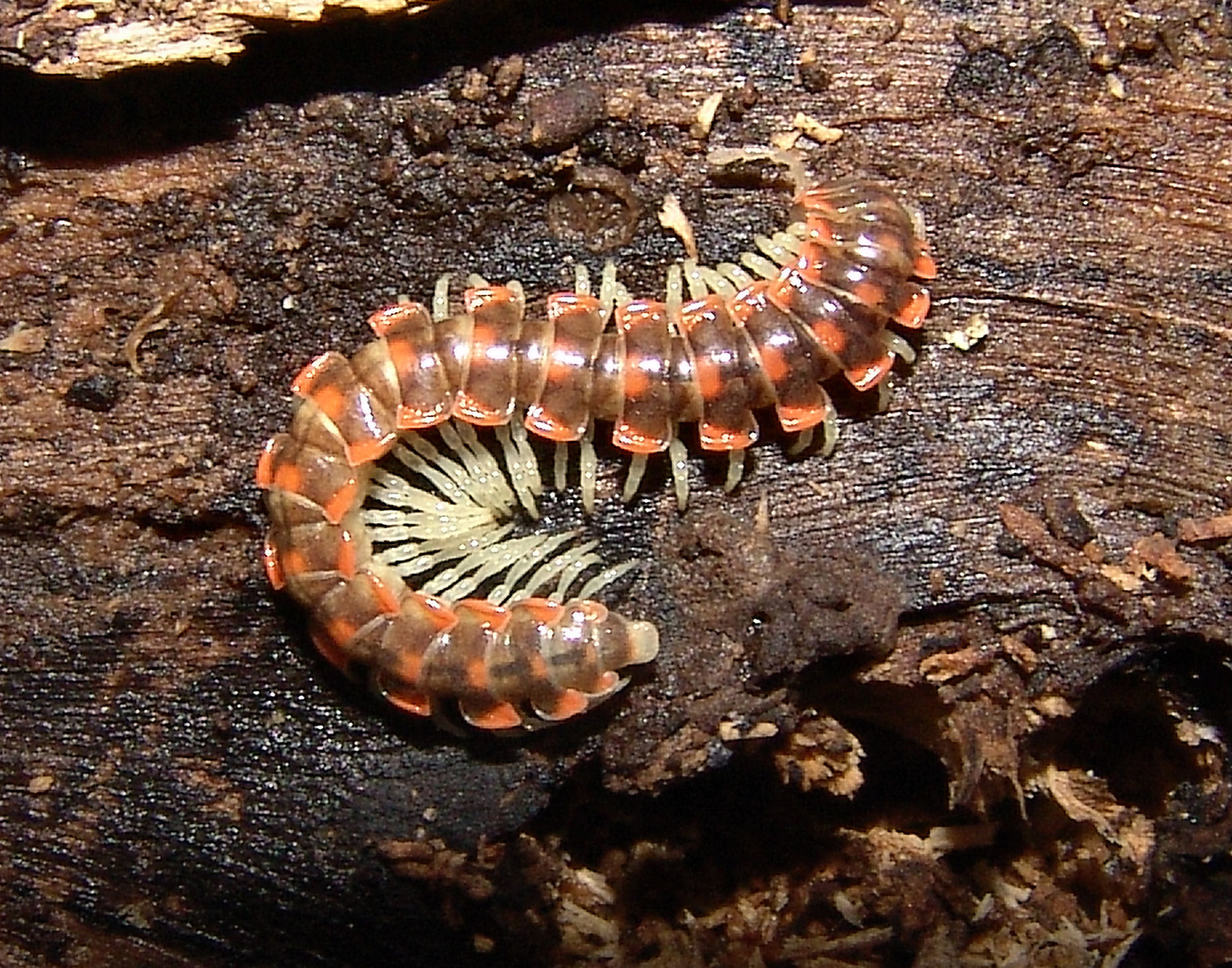

Scientific classification
- Kingdom: Animalia
- Phylum: Arthropoda
- Subphylum: Myriapoda
- Class: Diplopoda
- Order: Polydesmida
- Family: Euryuridae
- Genus: Auturus
- Species: A. evides

Binomial name
- Auturus evides (Bollman, 1887)

= Auturus evides =

Species of millipede

Auturus evides is a species of flat-backed millipede in the family Euryuridae and is found in North America. Auturus evides is dark brown with light orange spots on the posterior part of each segment. The lateral portion of each segment has a spot of the same color which widens toward the posterior end. The average total length is 27.1 mm; width, 3.1 mm; and weight, 0.153 g. Auturus evides respond negatively to light and positively to moisture, and are usually found within and beneath rotting logs of varying size and length. However, many have been found in low or damp places in and around logs with very little decay. They are never found in aggregations, but at times as many as a dozen have been recorded nesting under logs.
