= Psammodesmus atratus =

Scientific classification
- Kingdom: Animalia
- Phylum: Arthropoda
- Subphylum: Myriapoda
- Class: Diplopoda
- Order: Polydesmida
- Family: Platyrhacidae
- Genus: Psammodesmus
- Species: P. atratus

Binomial name
- Psammodesmus atratus (Chamberlin, 1947)

Species of millipede

Psammodesmus atratus is a flat-backed millipede of the family Platyrhacidae, found in West Colombia.

== Description ==
Adult individuals reach lengths of up to 60mm, they have 19 body segments, their body is dark brown with three light yellow stripes on the prozonites and metatergites of segments 2–19. Each segment has a pair of wide keels with yellow edges.
