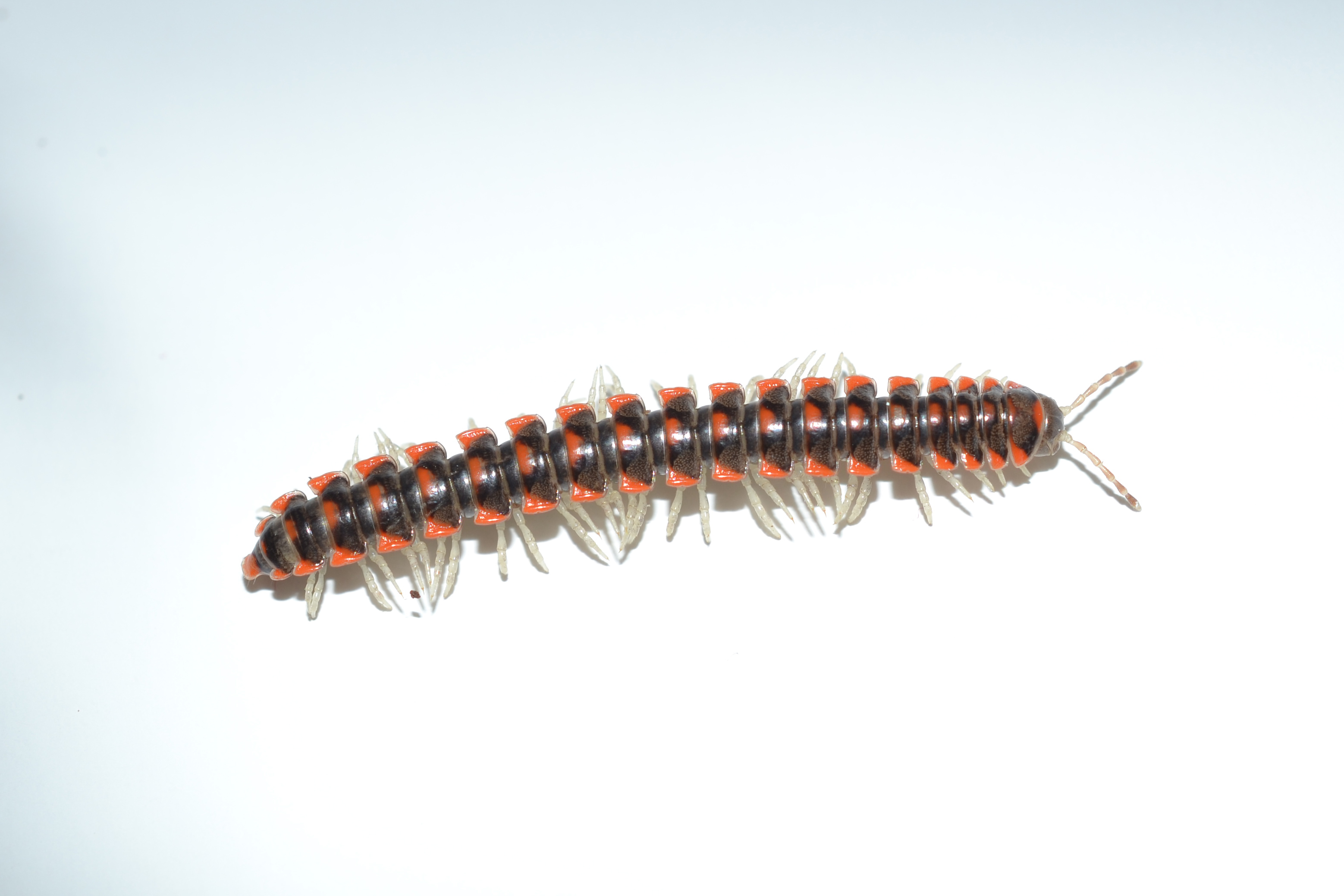

Scientific classification
- Kingdom: Animalia
- Phylum: Arthropoda
- Subphylum: Myriapoda
- Class: Diplopoda
- Order: Polydesmida
- Family: Euryuridae
- Genus: Euryurus
- Species: E. leachii

Binomial name
- Euryurus leachii (Gray, 1832)

= Euryurus leachii =

Species of millipede

Euryurus leachii, or Leach's millipede, is a species of flat-backed millipede in the family Euryuridae. It is found in North America.

== Subspecies ==
These two subspecies belong to the species Euryurus leachii:

- Euryurus leachii fraternus Hoffman, 1978
- Euryurus leachii leachii (Gray, 1832)
