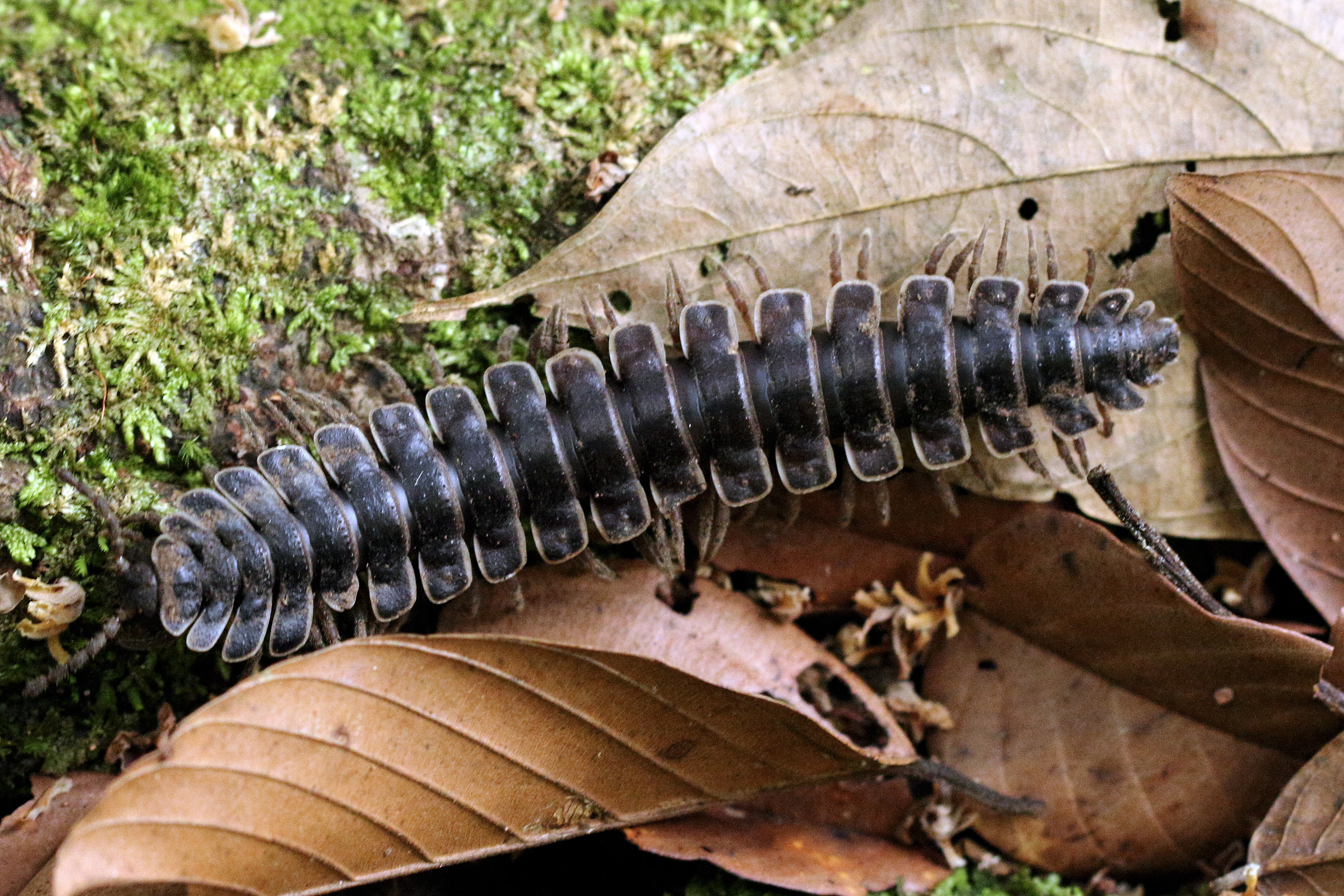
- A Borneo tractor millipede from Sabah, Stenoniodes sp.

Scientific classification
- Kingdom: Animalia
- Phylum: Arthropoda
- Subphylum: Myriapoda
- Class: Diplopoda
- Order: Polydesmida
- Family: Platyrhacidae
- Tribe: Platyrhacini
- Genus: Stenoniodes; Pocock, 1897

Type species
- Stenoniodes catorii

Species
- S. angulicollis; S. arrogans; S. baluensis; S. catorii; S. creaghii; S. sibutensis

= Stenoniodes =

Genus of millipedes

Stenoniodes, commonly known as the Borneo tractor millipede, is a genus of millipede in the family Platyrhacidae. It contains six species, five of which occur on Borneo and one on Sibutu Island. Its common name originates from the likeness of its 20-segmented body to the tread of a tractor's tire.

== Description ==
The genus is characterized by its trapezoid-shaped collum with dorsally flared edges, metatergites of segments 2 - 4 narrower than those of the midbody, sterna with paired ventrally-projecting spines, long legs, and curved gonopods bearing two acropodal processes.

== Taxonomic history ==
The genus was described by Pocock in 1897 based on material sent to him by English naturalists resident in the Greater Sunda Islands. In 2001, Hoffman synthesized material on Bornean Platyrhacidae, provided a key to genera, a diagnosis of the genus Stenoniodes, and synonymized and transferred several species. Jeekel, in 2007, listed the species of the genus Stenoniodes, and noted that Platyrhacus superbus Attems, 1931 may, according to its original description, be a species of the genus.

== Classification ==
Stenoniodes is a member of the family Platyrhacidae. Its placement in the family Platyrhacidae is based on the presence of a broadened flattened telson, a broad flattened peritreme encircling the ozopores, paranota with a thin lateral edge, the ozopores shifted medially away from the lateral paranotal edge, and simple gonopods without a coxal process nor a prefemoral process. The gonopods lack any divisions, spare the typical prefemoral region, and the apex is biramous (gonopods of millipedes in the family Platyrhacidae typically have uniramous or biramous acropodites, but can have up to five processes, pentaramous)
