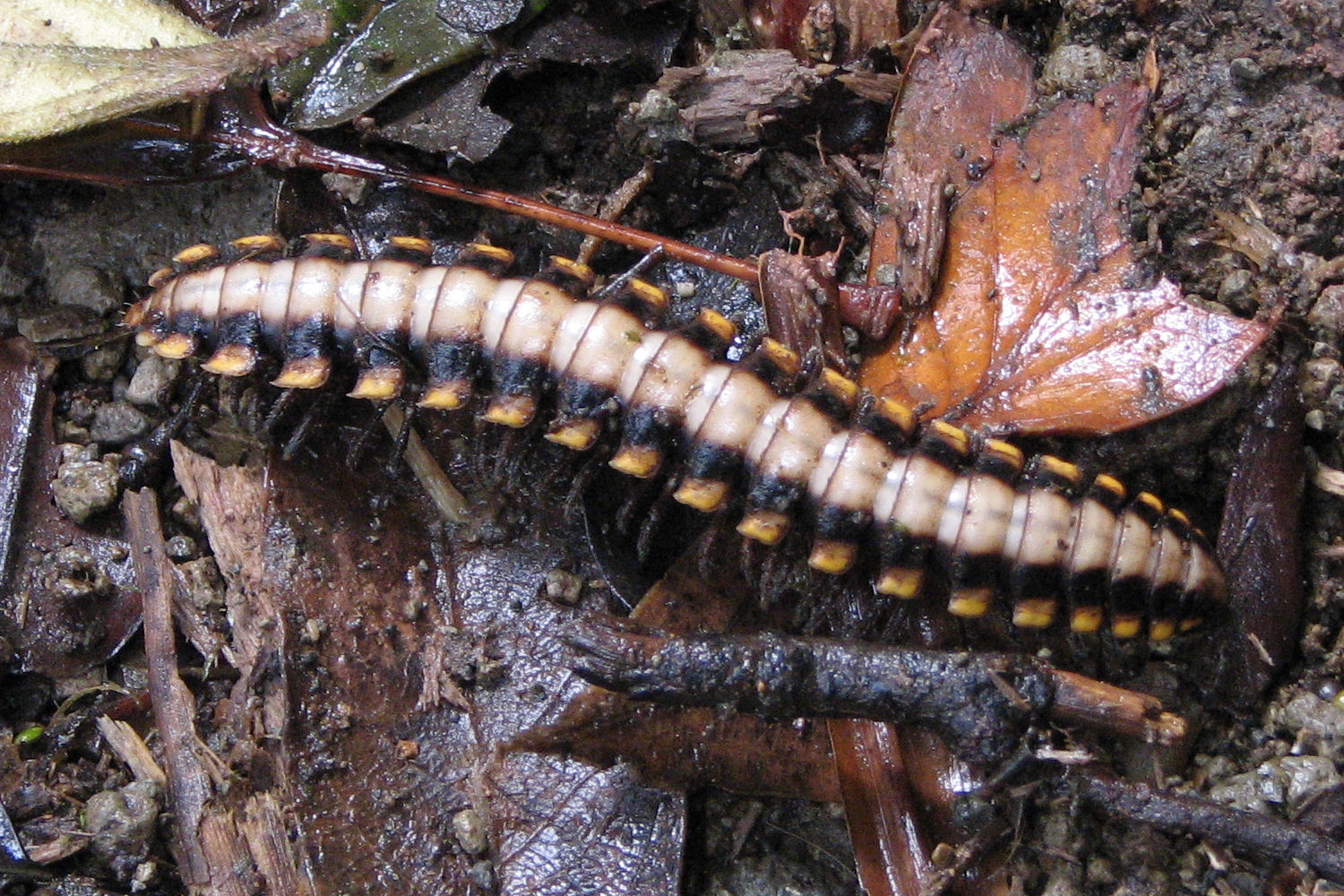
- Nyssodesmus python from Central America

Scientific classification
- Kingdom: Animalia
- Phylum: Arthropoda
- Subphylum: Myriapoda
- Class: Diplopoda
- Order: Polydesmida
- Suborder: Leptodesmidea
- Superfamily: Platyrhacoidea
- Family: Platyrhacidae; Pocock, 1895

Genera
- c. 50

Synonyms
- Platyrrhacidae

= Platyrhacidae =

Family of millipedes

Platyrhacidae is a family of polydesmidan millipedes distributed in Southeast Asia and tropical Central and South America.

== Description ==
Platyrhacids are often large and colorful. They can be distinguished from most other polydesmidans by having ozopores situated further inward from the paranota margins, ozopores surrounded by a broad, flat ring, and presence of compound setae on the labrum and often on the epiproct (a posterior extension of the telson). The gonopods in males are relatively simple, although up to five gonopodal processes ("branches") may be present in some genera from Borneo. Large platyrhacids in Borneo may grow up to 13 cm (5.1 in) long and exhibit colors of blue, green, and yellow with black spots or stripes. The largest known species in the order Polydesmida, however, is a platyrhacid species found in Sumatra, Gigantorhacus mirandus, which can reach 134 mm (5.3 in) in length.

== Distribution ==
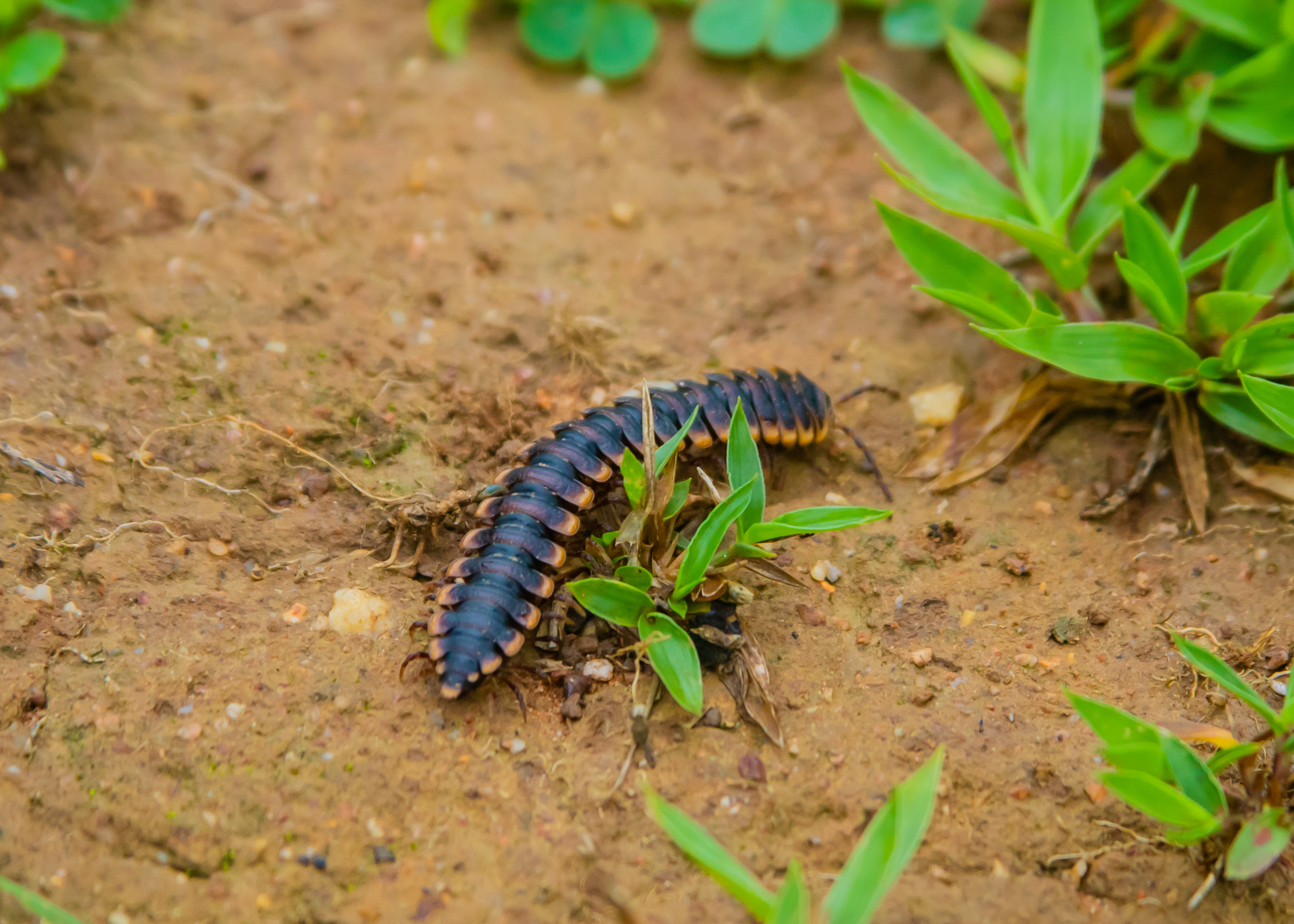
Platyrhacidae at Kyabobo National Park in Ghana

Platyrhacids occur in two disjunct geographic areas. The majority of species occur in Southeast Asia, including the Greater Sunda Islands and the Philippine archipelago. The rest occur in the New World Tropics from Nicaragua to Peru, as well as on some Caribbean islands.

== Classification ==
The Platyrhacidae is part of the larger suborder Leptodesmidea. The family Platyrhacidae is subdivided into several groups, formerly considered tribes but elevated to the status of subfamilies in 2013.

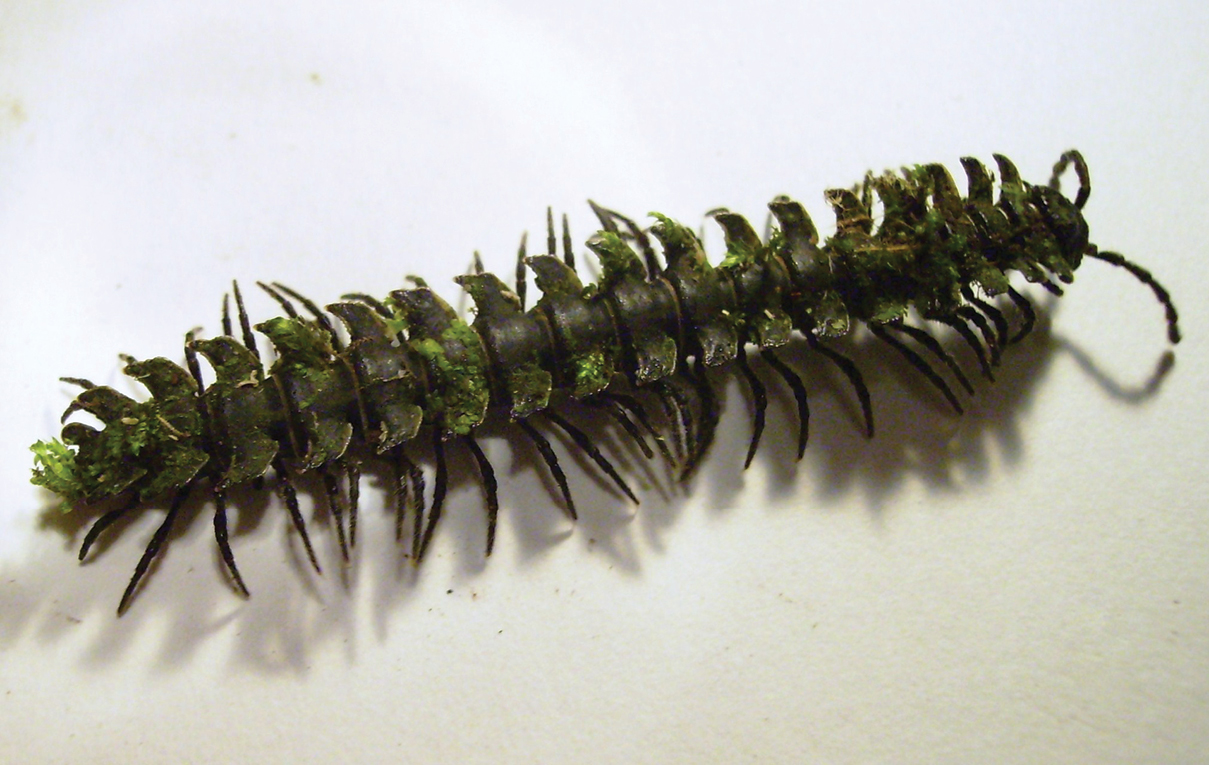
Psammodesmus bryophorus, a species from Colombia

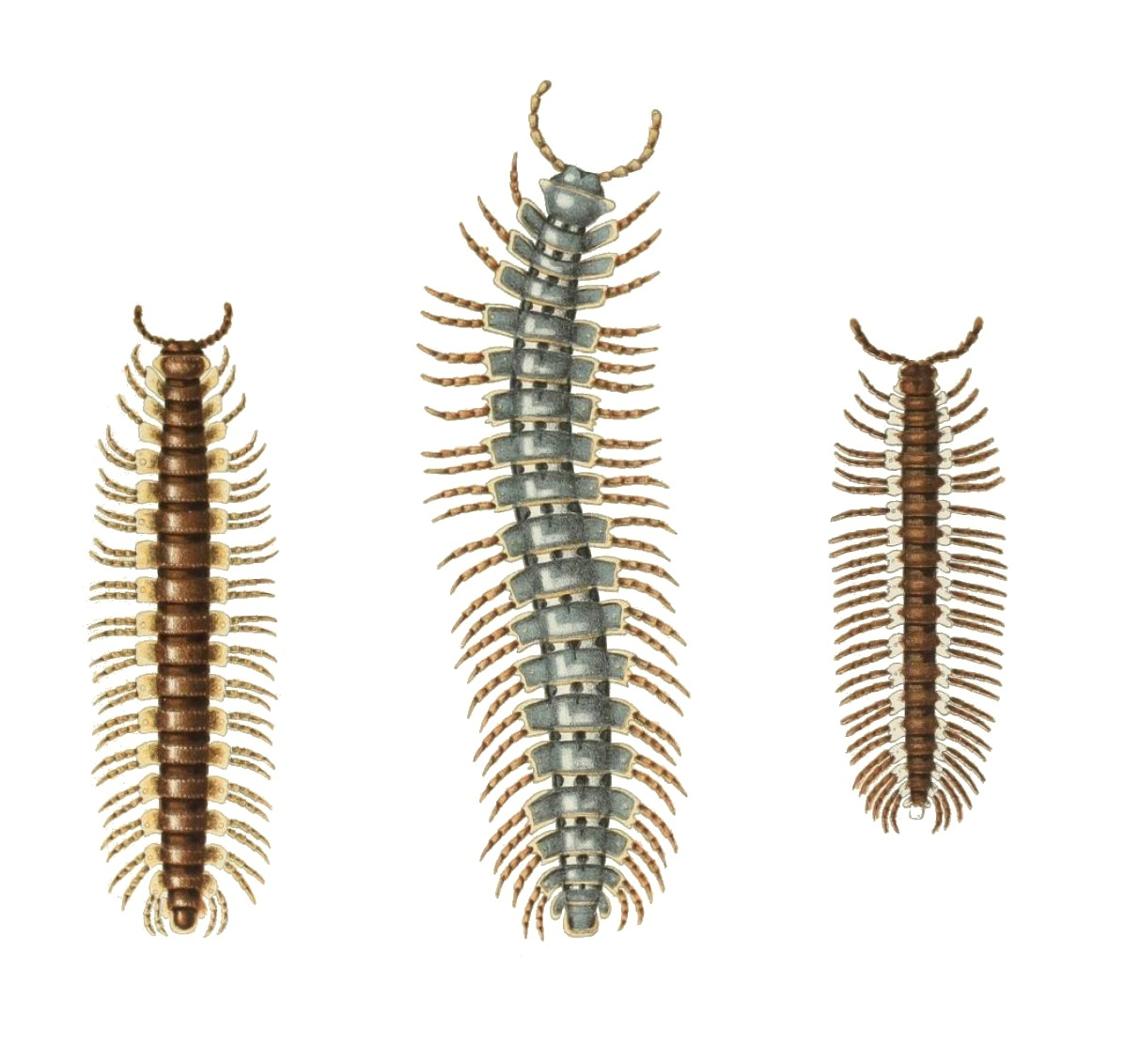
Platyrhacids of the Malay Archipelago

- Barydesminae - Neotropical America
  - Barydesmus
  - Nyssodesmus
  - Tyrodesmus
- Diodontodesminae - Solomon Islands
  - Diodontodesmus
- Erythrhacinae
- Hoplurorhachinae - Borneo
- Phyodesminae- Borneo
  - Phyodesmus
- Polydesmorhachinae -Palawan island, Philippines
- Psammodesminae - Neotropical America
  - Psammodesmus
- Psaphodesminae - Indonesia, east of Wallace's line
- Taphodesminae
  - Taphodesmus

Unplaced

The following genera have not yet been placed into a subfamily

- Hoffmanorhacus
- Nanorrhacus
- Proaspis

=== Classification history ===
The family (originally misspelled "Platyrrhacidae") was named by Reginald Pocock in 1895 to include the single genus Platyrhacus. Shortly after, Orator F. Cook added Acanthodesmus, Odontodesmus, and Trachelodesmus. By 1897, additional works by Cook, Pocock, and Filippo Silvestri had increased the number of genera to 37.

The North American genera Euryurus, Auturus, and Illiniurus, were long-considered to constitute a sub-group of Platyrhacidae (i.e. the subfamily Euryurinae or tribe Euryurini in various classifications), until separated as a distinct family (Euryuridae) by Hoffman in 1998 and allied closer to Xystodesmidae. Similarly and concurrently, several neotropical genera previously placed in other subgroups of Platyrhacidae were removed and elevated to full family status: the Aphelidesmidae.
