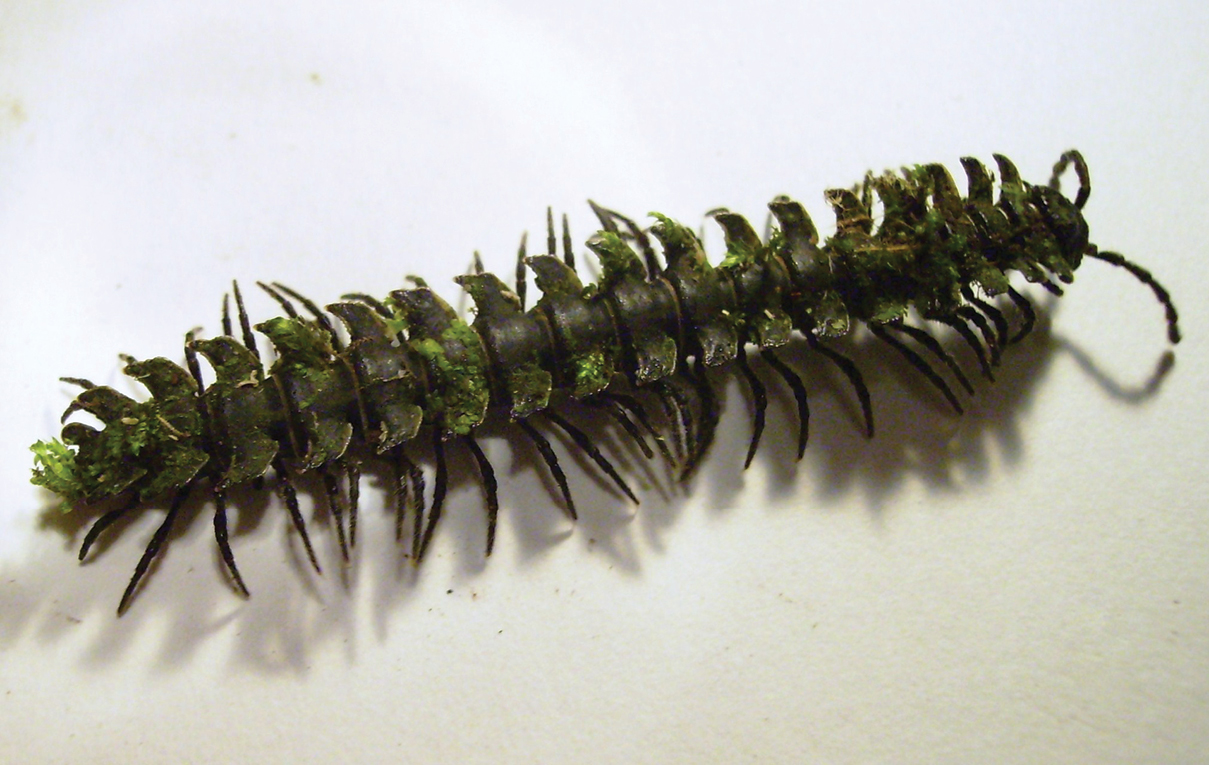

Scientific classification
- Kingdom: Animalia
- Phylum: Arthropoda
- Subphylum: Myriapoda
- Class: Diplopoda
- Order: Polydesmida
- Family: Platyrhacidae
- Genus: Psammodesmus
- Species: P. bryophorus

Binomial name
- Psammodesmus bryophorus Hoffman, Martínez & Flórez, 2011

= Psammodesmus bryophorus =

Species of millipede

Psammodesmus bryophorus, the moss millipede, is a keeled millipede of the family Platyrhacidae native to Colombia. It was described in 2011, and with several species of symbiotic moss found growing on its dorsal surface, it is the first millipede known with epizoic plants.

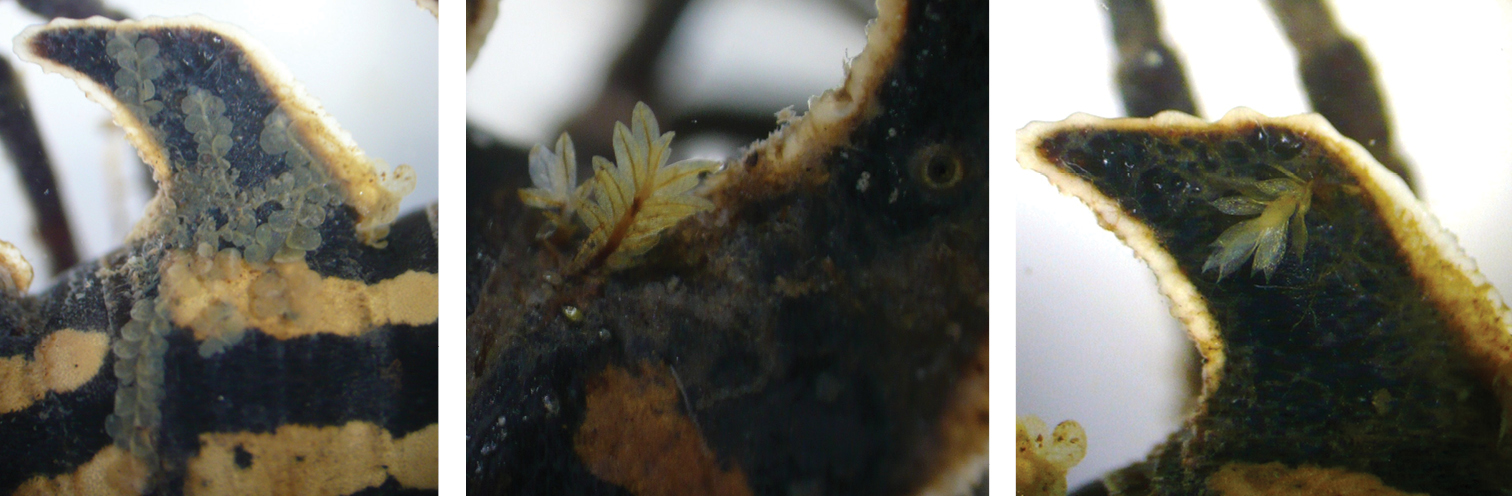
Three species of moss on P. bryophorus

At least 10 species of bryophytes belonging to families Pilotrichaceae, Lejeuneaceae, Fissidentaceae, Metzgeriaceae and Leucomiaceae have been found to grow on the millipede's dorsum; these plants are believed to camouflage the millipede as its cuticle provides a stable substrate.

== Description ==
Adult moss millipedes have 19 body segments, each with a pair of wide keels; the coloration of their dorsum ranges from dark brown to black, having two light-colored stripes on the prozonites and metatergites of segments 2–19. The edges of the paranota are white and the legs, antennae and ventral surface of the trunk are reddish brown.

== Habitat ==
Psammodesmus bryophorus is found in Río Ñambí Natural Reserve, a transitional Andean-Pacific forest in South West Colombia, preferring tree trunks and leaves, about 1m above the ground; however, they can also be found between the leaf litter and the soil surface.
