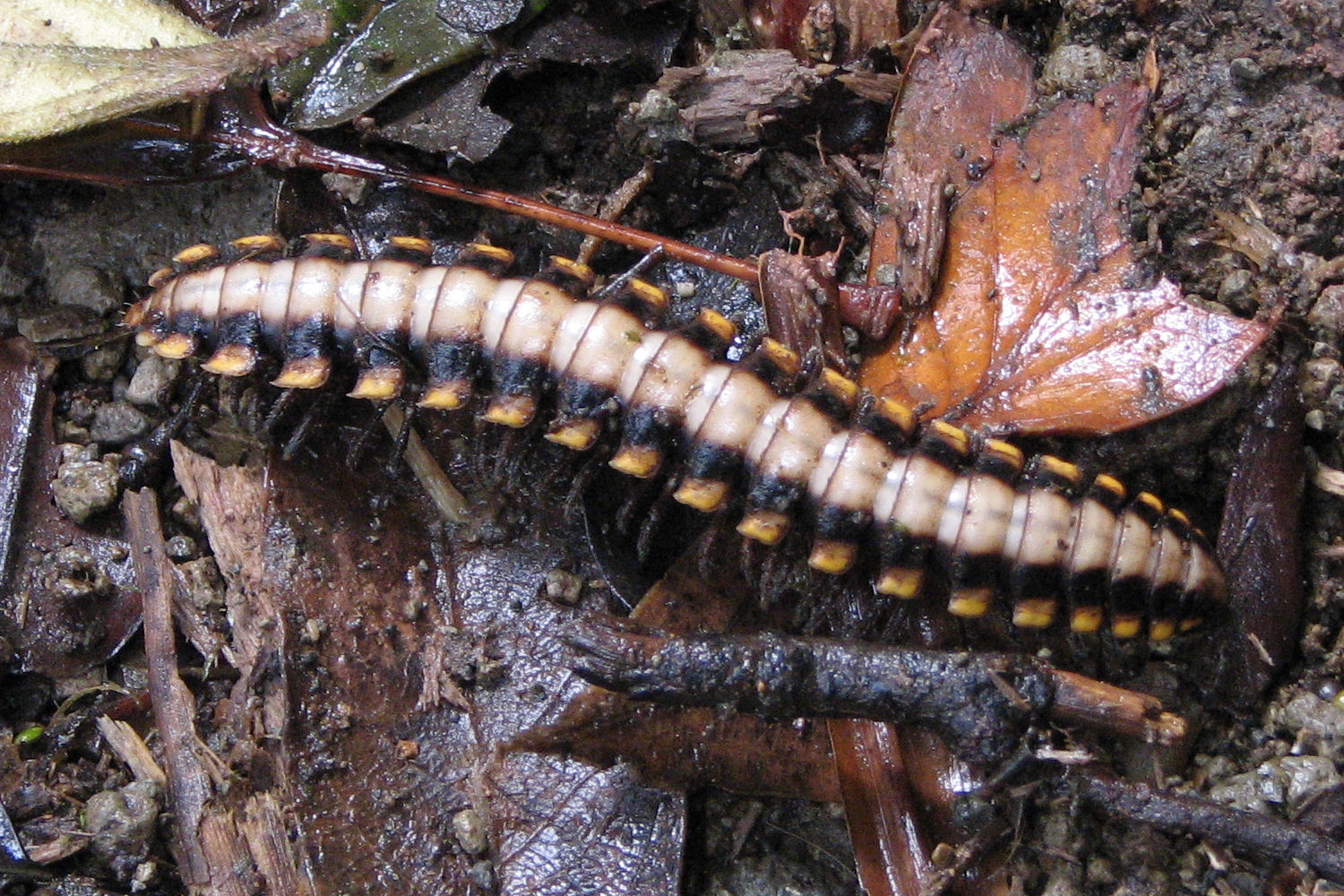

Scientific classification
- Kingdom: Animalia
- Phylum: Arthropoda
- Subphylum: Myriapoda
- Class: Diplopoda
- Order: Polydesmida
- Family: Platyrhacidae
- Genus: Nyssodesmus
- Species: N. python

Binomial name
- Nyssodesmus python (Peters, 1864)

Synonyms
- Polydesmus python Peters, 1864; Platyrrhacus bivirgatus Carl, 1902; Nyssodesmus nigricaudus Chamberlin, 1922

= Nyssodesmus python =

Species of millipede

Nyssodesmus python also known as the python millipede or large forest-floor millipede is a species of flat-backed millipede of the family Platyrhacidae commonly found in Costa Rica, where it occurs widely and is locally abundant in the Caribbean slopes from sea level to around 365 meters (1,200 feet) in elevation. Individuals reach lengths of up to 10 cm (4 in), and are conspicuously colored in yellowish tan with brown or black stripes. Their appearance is sometimes likened to a human spine. These millipedes are often encountered in pairs, with the male straddling the back of the female long after mating, to prevent other males from fertilizing the female's eggs before she lays them.

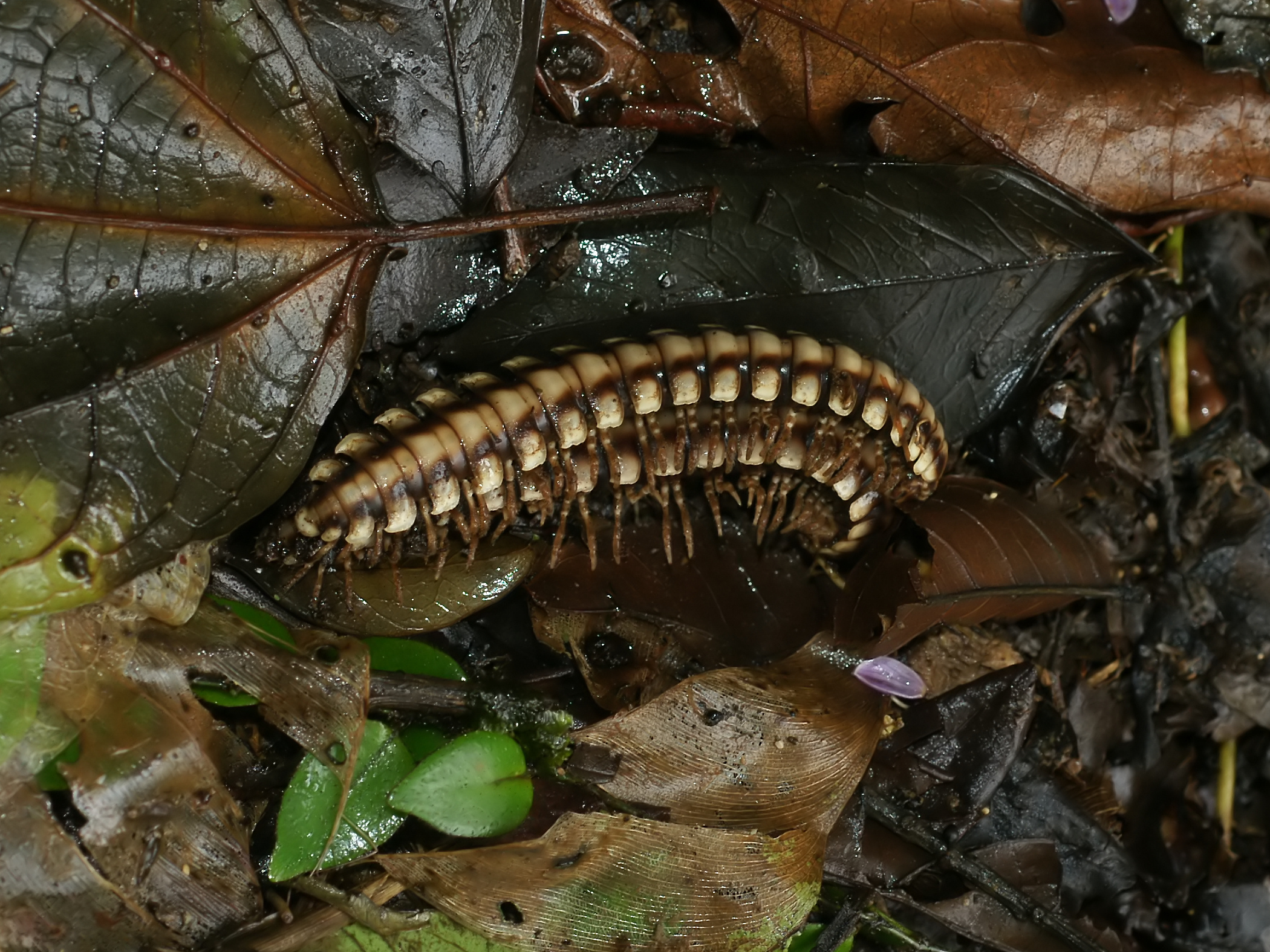
Pair (male on top)
