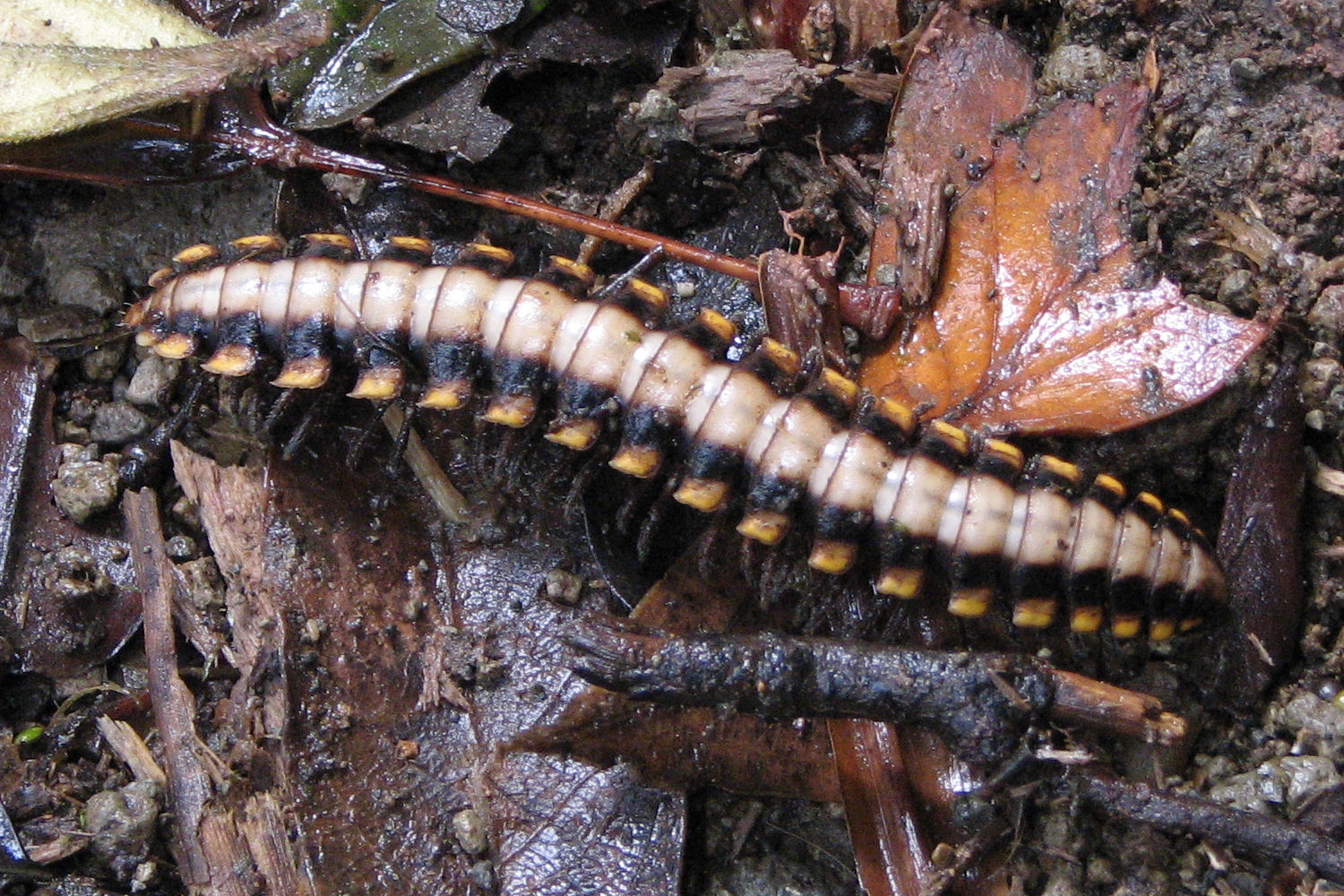
- Nyssodesmus python

Scientific classification
- Kingdom: Animalia
- Phylum: Arthropoda
- Subphylum: Myriapoda
- Class: Diplopoda
- Order: Polydesmida
- Family: Platyrhacidae
- Subfamily: Barydesminae
- Genus: Nyssodesmus; Cook, 1896

= Nyssodesmus =

Genus of millipedes

Nyssodesmus is a genus of flat-backed millipedes in the family Platyrhacidae. About a dozen species have been described, all native to Central America, occurring from Nicaragua to Panama.

== Species ==
- Nyssodesmus alboalatus
- Nyssodesmus antius
- Nyssodesmus attemsi
- Nyssodesmus concolor
- Nyssodesmus fraternus
- Nyssodesmus limonensis
- Nyssodesmus luteolus
- Nyssodesmus mimus
- Nyssodesmus nicaraguanus
- Nyssodesmus python
- Nyssodesmus tristani
- Nyssodesmus vialis
