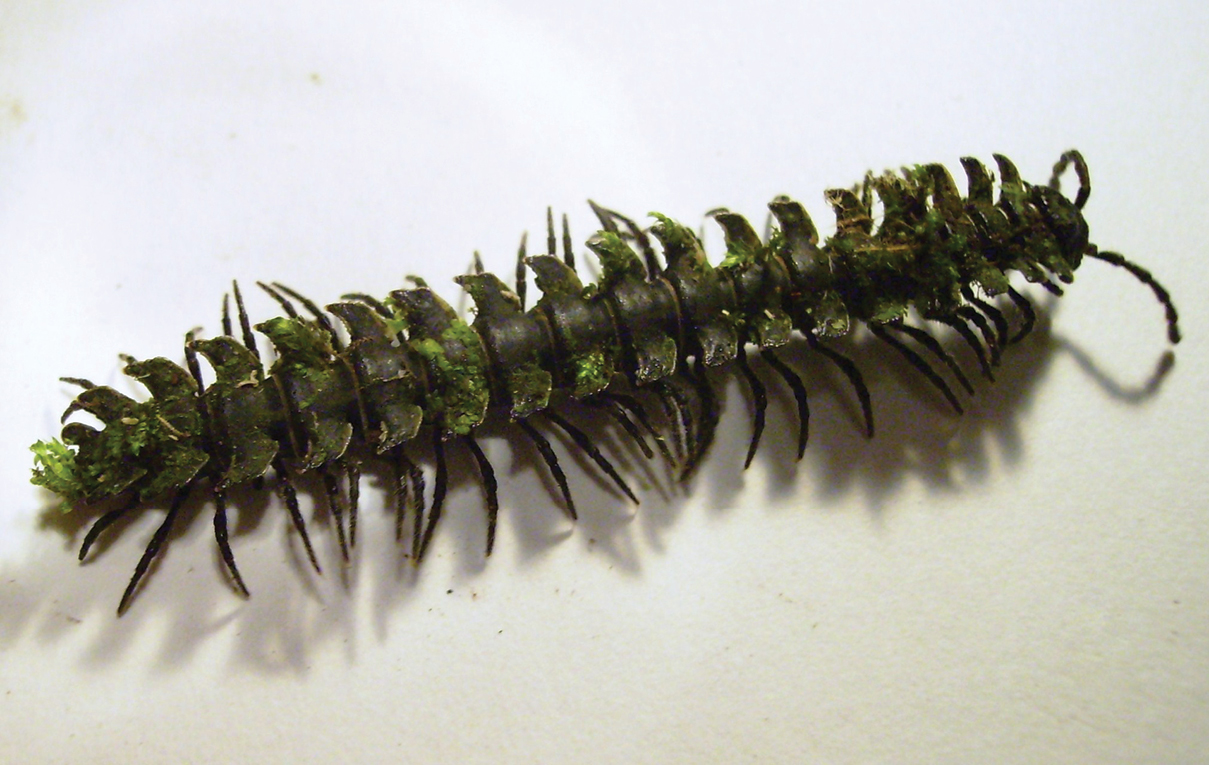
- Psammodesmus bryophorus

Scientific classification
- Kingdom: Animalia
- Phylum: Arthropoda
- Subphylum: Myriapoda
- Class: Diplopoda
- Order: Polydesmida
- Family: Platyrhacidae
- Subfamily: Psammodesminae; Hoffman, 1980
- Genus: Psammodesmus; Cook, 1895

Synonyms
- Ernostyx Chamberlin, 1941

= Psammodesmus =

Genus of millipedes

Psammodesmus is a genus of platyrhacid millipedes found from Panama to Peru. The 11 species constitute the platyrhacid subfamily Psammodesminae (formerly the tribe Psammodesmini).

== Species ==
- Psammodesmus atratus (Chamberlin, 1947)
- Psammodesmus bryophorus Hoffman, Martínez & Flórez, 2011
- Psammodesmus cainarachus (Chamberlin, 1941)
- Psammodesmus calius (Chamberlin, 1952)
- Psammodesmus camerani Silvestri, 1897
- Psammodesmus chuncho (Chamberlin), 1941
- Psammodesmus cos Cook, 1896
- Psammodesmus dasys (Chamberlin, 1941)
- Psammodesmus fasciolatus Silvestri, 1898
- Psammodesmus remotus Loomis, 1964
- Psammodesmus schmitti Loomis & Hoffman, 1953
