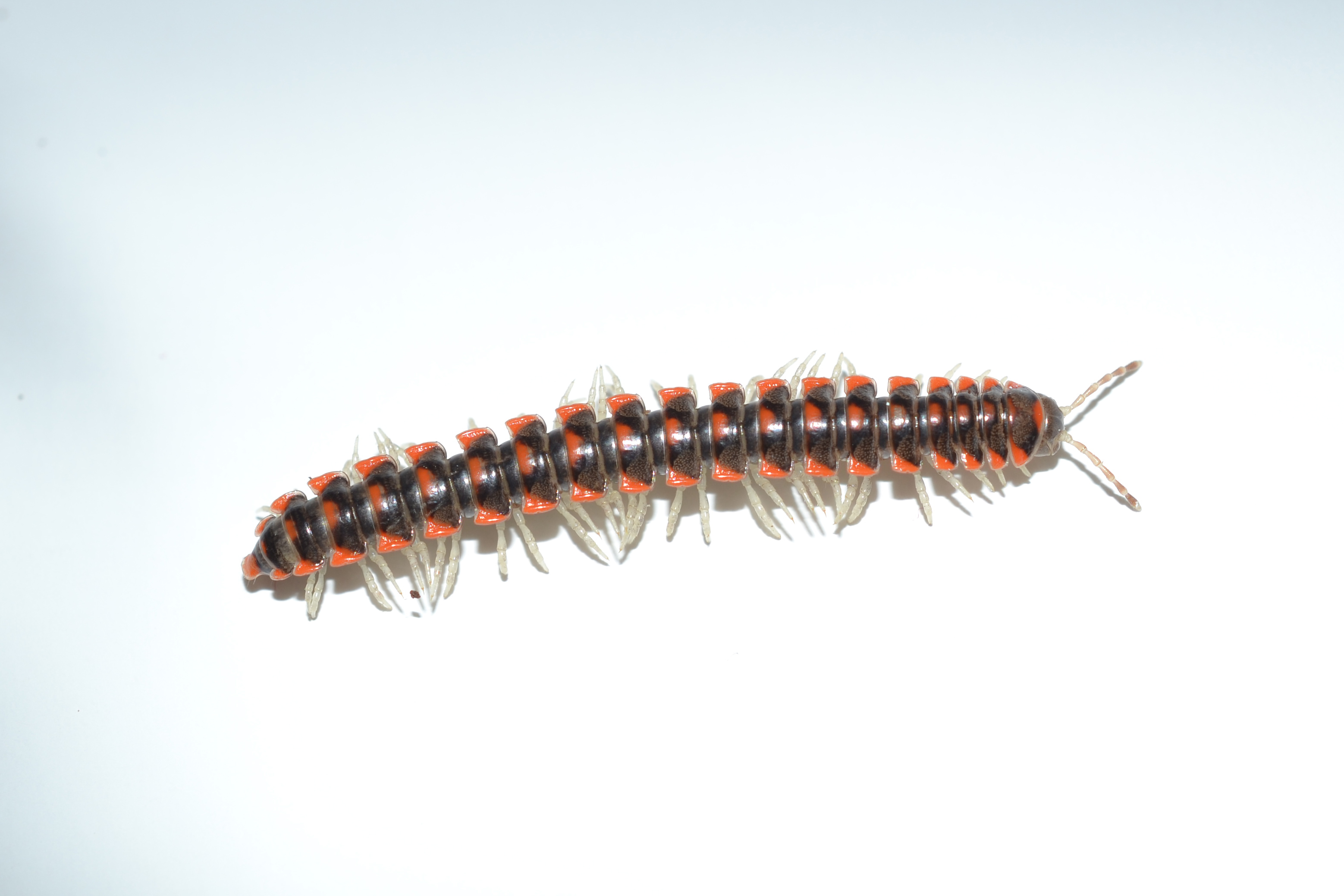
- Euryurus leachii

Scientific classification
- Kingdom: Animalia
- Phylum: Arthropoda
- Subphylum: Myriapoda
- Class: Diplopoda
- Order: Polydesmida
- Family: Euryuridae
- Genus: Euryurus; Koch, 1847

= Euryurus =

Genus of millipedes

Euryurus is a genus of flat-backed millipedes in the family Euryuridae. There are about 14 described species in Euryurus.

== Species ==
- Euryurus amycus Hoffman, 1978
- Euryurus australis Bollman, 1889
- Euryurus carolinensis (DeSaussure, 1859)
- Euryurus cingulatus Hoffman, 1978
- Euryurus falcipes Loomis, 1943
- Euryurus flavocarinatus Daday, 1889
- Euryurus leachii (Gray, 1832) (Leach's millipede)
- Euryurus louisiana Chamberlin, 1918
- Euryurus maculatus C. L. Koch, 1847
- Euryurus margaritaceus (C. L. Koch, 1847)
- Euryurus mississippiensis (Causey, 1955)
- Euryurus orestes Hoffman, 1978
- Euryurus pallipes Koch, 1877
- Euryurus squamatus (C. L. Koch, 1847)
