= Auturus =

Scientific classification
- Kingdom: Animalia
- Phylum: Arthropoda
- Subphylum: Myriapoda
- Class: Diplopoda
- Order: Polydesmida
- Family: Euryuridae
- Genus: Auturus; Chamberlin, 1942

Genus of millipedes

Auturus is a genus of flat-backed millipedes in the family Euryuridae. There are about 11 described species in Auturus.

== Species ==
These 11 species belong to the genus Auturus:

- Auturus becki Chamberlin, 1951
- Auturus dixianus Chamberlin, 1942
- Auturus erythropygos (Brandt, 1839)
- Auturus evides (Bollman, 1887)
- Auturus florus Causey, 1950
- Auturus georgianus Chamberlin
- Auturus louisianus (Chamberlin, 1918)
- Auturus mcclurkini Causey, 1955
- Auturus mimetes Chamberlin, 1942
- Auturus phanus Chamberlin, 1942
- Auturus scotius Chamberlin, 1942
