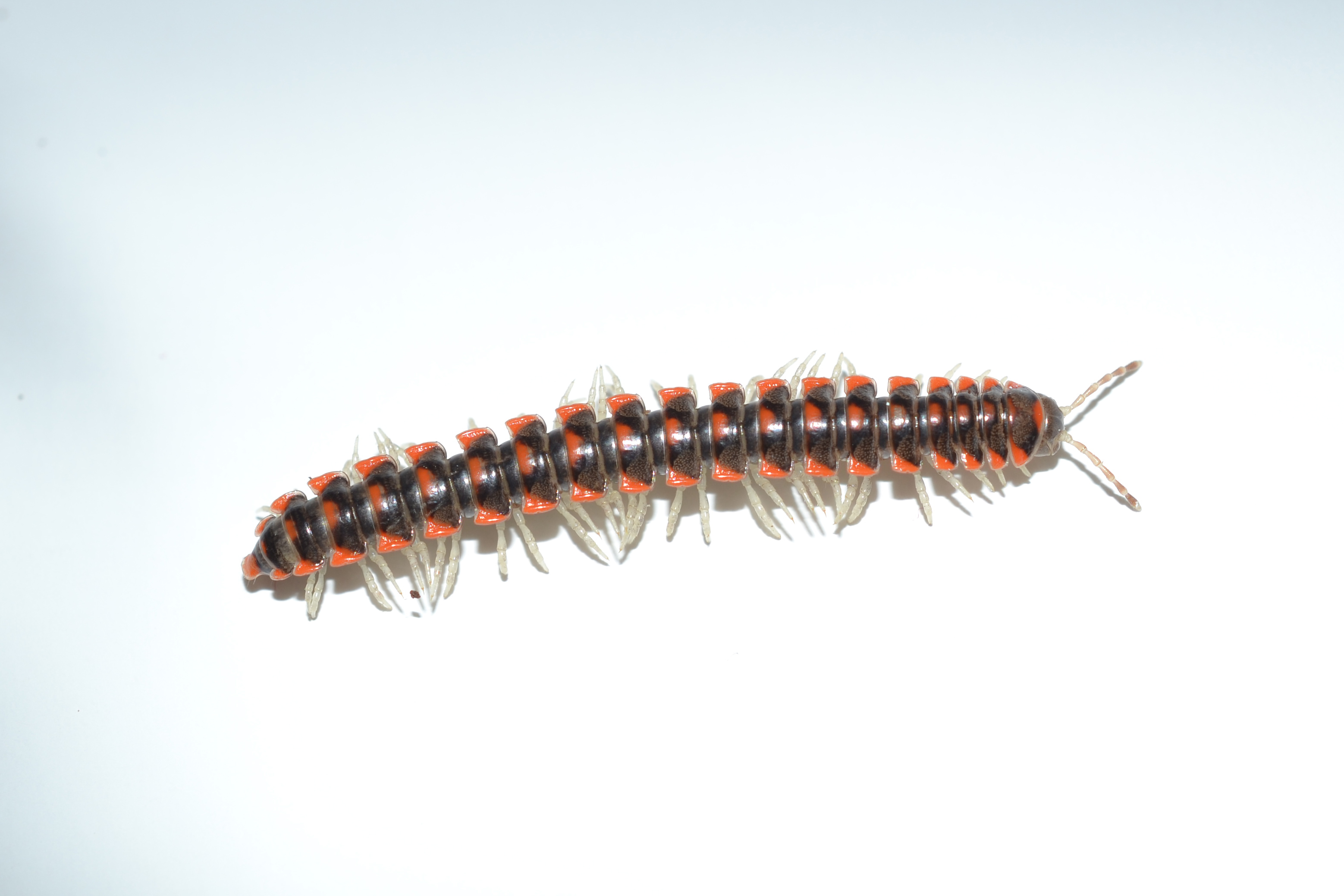
- Euryurus leachii

Scientific classification
- Kingdom: Animalia
- Phylum: Arthropoda
- Subphylum: Myriapoda
- Class: Diplopoda
- Order: Polydesmida
- Suborder: Leptodesmidea
- Family: Euryuridae; Pocock, 1909

Genera
- See text

= Euryuridae =

Family of millipedes

Euryuridae is a family of flat-backed millipedes in the order Polydesmida. There are at least four genera and about 14 described species in Euryuridae.

== Genera ==
- Auturus Chamberlin, 1942
- Euryurus Koch, 1847
- Eutheatus
- Illiniurus Shear, 1968
