= Petaserpes strictus =

Scientific classification
- Domain: Eukaryota
- Kingdom: Animalia
- Phylum: Arthropoda
- Subphylum: Myriapoda
- Class: Diplopoda
- Order: Polyzoniida
- Family: Polyzoniidae
- Genus: Petaserpes
- Species: P. strictus

Binomial name
- Petaserpes strictus (Shelley, 1976)

Species of millipede

Petaserpes strictus is a species of millipede in the family Polyzoniidae. It is found in North America.
