= Petaserpes cryptocephalus =

Scientific classification
- Kingdom: Animalia
- Phylum: Arthropoda
- Subphylum: Myriapoda
- Class: Diplopoda
- Order: Polyzoniida
- Family: Polyzoniidae
- Genus: Petaserpes
- Species: P. cryptocephalus

Binomial name
- Petaserpes cryptocephalus (McNeill, 1887)

Species of millipede

Petaserpes cryptocephalus is a species of millipede in the family Polyzoniidae. It is found in North America.
