= Polyzonium transsilvanicum =

Scientific classification
- Domain: Eukaryota
- Kingdom: Animalia
- Phylum: Arthropoda
- Subphylum: Myriapoda
- Class: Diplopoda
- Order: Polyzoniida
- Family: Polyzoniidae
- Genus: Polyzonium
- Species: P. transsilvanicum

Binomial name
- Polyzonium transsilvanicum Verhoeff, 1898

Species of millipede

Polyzonium transsilvanicum, is a species of millipede within the genus Polyzonium and family Polyzoniidae. The species can be found within the European countries of Moldova, Romania, Slovakia and Ukraine, where it is endemic to the East Carpathian mountain range.
