= Petaserpes rosalbus =

Scientific classification
- Kingdom: Animalia
- Phylum: Arthropoda
- Subphylum: Myriapoda
- Class: Diplopoda
- Order: Polyzoniida
- Family: Polyzoniidae
- Genus: Petaserpes
- Species: P. rosalbus

Binomial name
- Petaserpes rosalbus Cope, 1870

Synonyms
- List: Polyzonium rosalbum (Cope, 1879)

Species of millipede

Petaserpes rosalbus is a species of millipede within the family Polyzoniidae. It is one of six recognised species within the genus Petaserpes. The species is native to North America, where it can be found living within the state of Virginia. P. rosalbus has been recorded to inhabit mountainous habitat at elevations up to 762 meters above sea level.

== Description ==
The head of Petaserpes rosalbus is short and broad, with straight sides that meet at an angle above 70 degrees. It is adorned with antennae that, when extended outward, do not reach the length of its midbody. The antennae possess thick joints. The body of P. rosalbus is strongly convex and consists of 50 to 60 segments. The body measures from 12 to 19 mm in length and approximately one-fifth or one-sixth as wide. The ocelli, usually three on each side, but occasionally four in some specimens, are positioned on the head. The rows of ocelli are separated by a distance greater than the diameter of an ocellus, and the posterior separation is usually three to four times as much. On the fifth segment, the millipede possesses moderately low pores located on the sides, which open from a slight depression within a usually large pore pad. Other pores are found at nearly the same level, with a slight depression usually present behind them. The penultimate segment features narrowly rounded posterior corners, while the back margin is shallow to moderately emarginate at the middle. The last segment is broad and faintly rounded behind, with sides that strongly diverge cephalad. These structural characteristics contribute to the millipede's overall body shape and movement capabilities.

The anterior gonopod of P. rosalbus exhibits a coxal lobe that rises behind joints 2 and 3, accompanied by an abrupt rise in the outer limit of the sternum. The first and second pair of legs have high coxal lobes that are elongated and somewhat hollowed on the inner anterior surface. The other leg joints are short and thick, each featuring a large, broadly oval pouch pit. The claws of the millipede's legs are slender, slightly curved, and acute at the tip, resembling the following legs. The sternum is wide, providing support and stability to the legs. The pregenital legs of P. rosalbus gradually become less thickened compared to the postgenital legs. The pouch pits on the pregenital legs are smaller but also oval in shape, while the postgenital pits are moderately large and rounded, some being broadly oval. The sterna of legs 3 to 8 are very broad, and those located behind the gonopods are narrow, with the coxae almost in contact.

== Defence mechanisms ==
When attacked by predatory insects such as ants, Petaserpes rosalbus will excrete a defensive fluid containing the spirocyclic terpene alkaloid compounds Polyzonimine and Nitropolyzonamine. The fluid is whitish in colour, sticky and has a strong odour. The secretion is released through opening glands on the millipedes sides and coats the millipedes body. Both of the compounds act as repellents and deterrents to predatory insects such as ants ensuring the millipede is protected from further attack as the predator is repelled.
