= Polyzonium eburneum =

Scientific classification
- Kingdom: Animalia
- Phylum: Arthropoda
- Subphylum: Myriapoda
- Class: Diplopoda
- Order: Polyzoniida
- Family: Polyzoniidae
- Genus: Polyzonium
- Species: P. eburneum

Binomial name
- Polyzonium eburneum Verhoeff, 1907

Synonyms
- List: Polyzonium eburneum cadoricum Verhoeff, 1930; Polyzonium eburneum eburneum Verhoeff, 1907

Species of millipede

Polyzonium eburneum, is a species of millipede within the genus Polyzonium and family Polyzoniidae. The species is native to the European countries of Austria, Italy, Poland and Slovakia, where it can be found inhabiting the mountain ranges of the Eastern Alps and Western Carpathian.
