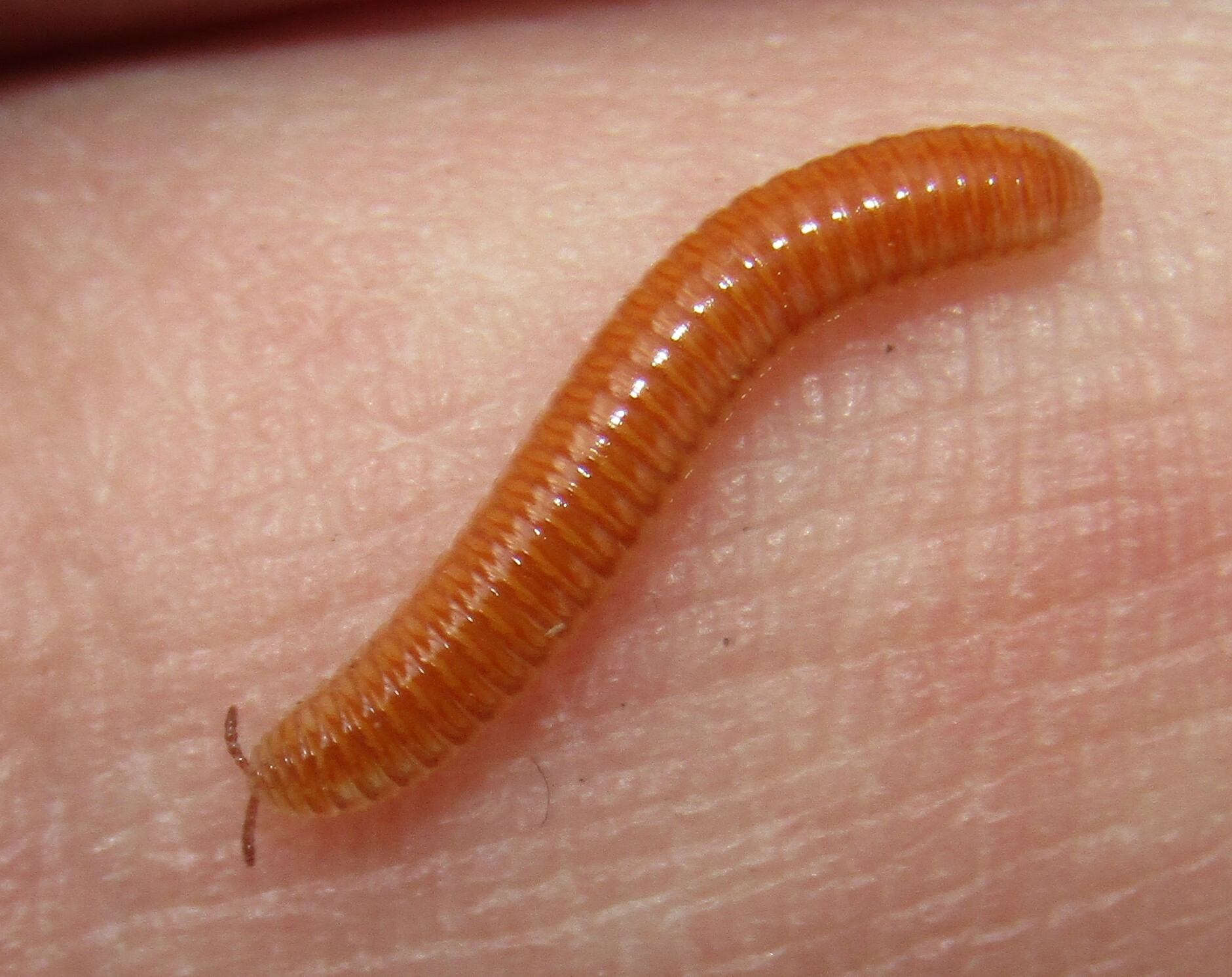

Scientific classification
- Domain: Eukaryota
- Kingdom: Animalia
- Phylum: Arthropoda
- Subphylum: Myriapoda
- Class: Diplopoda
- Order: Polyzoniida
- Family: Polyzoniidae
- Genus: Polyzonium
- Species: P. germanicum

Binomial name
- Polyzonium germanicum Brandt, 1837

Synonyms
- List: Platyiulus audouinianus Gervais, 1836; Platyulus audouinianus C. L. Koch, 1844; Polyzonium bosniense Verhoeff, 1898; Polyzonium controversarium Verhoeff, 1937; Polyzonium controversiarum Verhoeff, 1937 (misspelled); Polyzonium germanicum albanicum Verhoeff, 1932; Polyzonium germanicum illyricum Verhoeff, 1908

= Polyzonium germanicum =

Species of myriapod

Polyzonium germanicum, also known as the Kentish pinhead is a species of millipede within the genus Polyzonium and family Polyzoniidae.

== Description ==
Polyzonium germanicum is a distinctive looking arthropod with a very small triangular shaped head. P. germanicum can range from 5mm to 18mm in length. Unlike most millipedes this species hatches with 4 pairs of legs, as opposed to the usual 3 pairs that most other millipede species hatch with. P. germanicum possesses a brownish orange body. P. germanicum possess ozadenes, however they are not present in the first 5 body segments of the organism. These ozadenes will secrete an irritant monoterpene substance to discourage predators.

== Distribution ==
Polyzonium germanicum has an extensive range throughout Europe, where it inhabits both Temperate and Mediterranean climates. The species has been recorded within the countries of: Albania, Austria, Belarus, Bosnia and Herzegovina, Bulgaria, Croatia, Czech Republic, Denmark, Estonia, Finland, France, Germany, Hungary, Italy, Latvia, Lithuania, Moldova, Montenegro, North Macedonia, Poland, Romania, Russia, Serbia, Slovakia, Slovenia, Spain, Sweden, United Kingdom and Ukraine.

== Habitat ==
Polyzonium germanicum is a species associated with woodland habitats where it has been recorded to live in mixed deciduous and coniferous woodlands on chalk soils. The species has also been known to live in areas of mature coppices of Castanea sativa and Corylus avellana. Populations are highest in woodland and forest habitats containing coarse woody debris.

In Slovakia P. germanicum has been recorded living in beech forests at 700–1100 meters above sea level.

== Subspecies ==
- Polyzonium germanicum atlanticum (Brölemann 1935) - Located in France.
