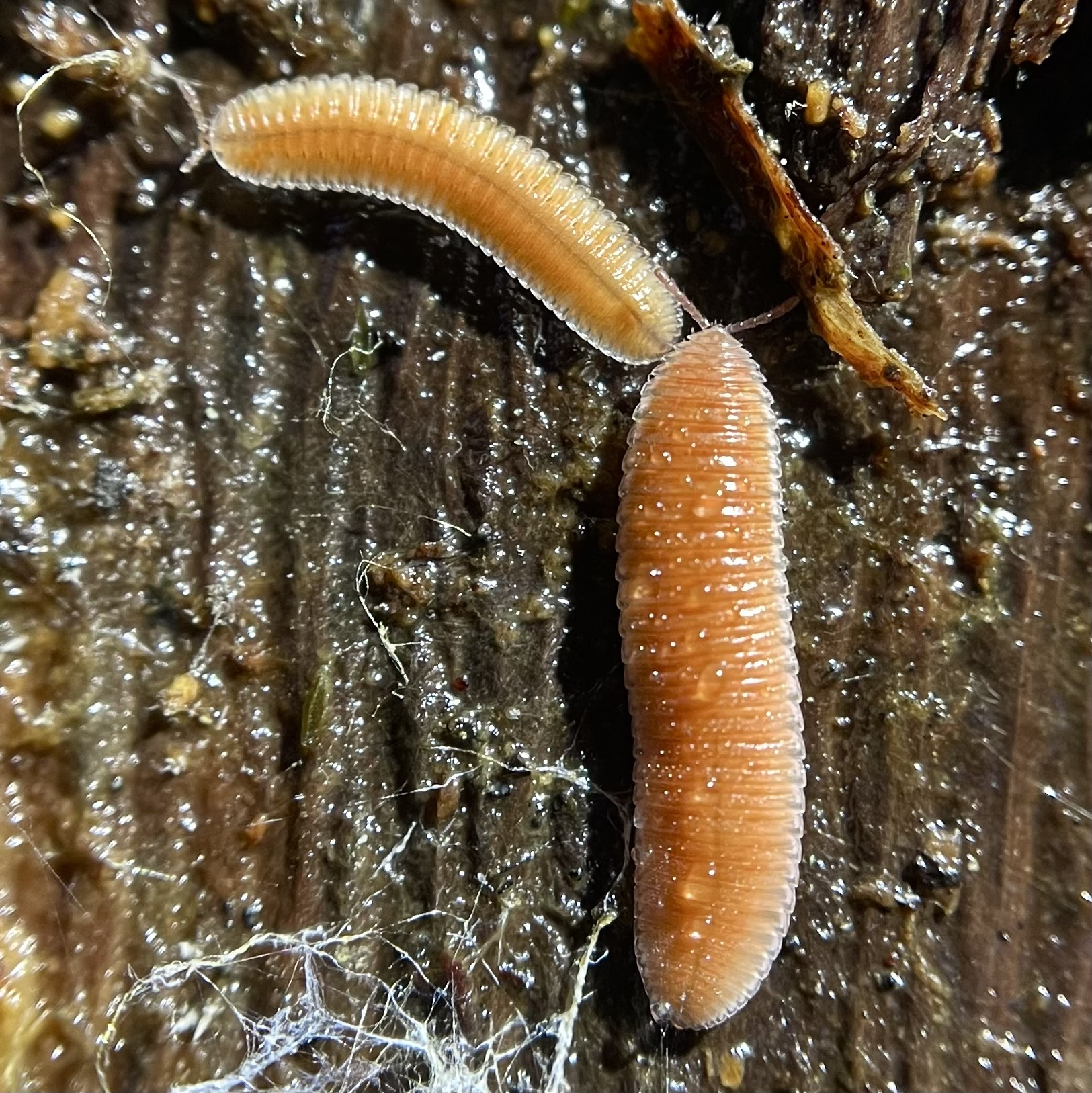

Scientific classification
- Domain: Eukaryota
- Kingdom: Animalia
- Phylum: Arthropoda
- Subphylum: Myriapoda
- Class: Diplopoda
- Order: Polyzoniida
- Family: Polyzoniidae
- Genus: Bdellozonium
- Species: B. cerviculatum

Binomial name
- Bdellozonium cerviculatum Cook & Loomis, 1928

Synonyms
- List: Bdellozonium rothi Chamberlin,1950; Bdellozonium sequoium Chamberlin,1941

= Bdellozonium cerviculatum =

Species of millipede

Bdellozonium cerviculatum is a species of millipede within the family Polyzoniidae. It is one of two recognised species within the genus Bdellozonium. The species is native to North America, where it can be found within the forests of California inhabiting crevices within coarse woody debris such as decaying logs and tree bark.

== Description ==
=== Head ===
The head of Bdellozonium cerviculatum features antennae that are about one and a half times longer than the width of the first body segment. The species possesses 3 to 4 ocelli on each side, arranged in an oblique row. A low tubercle bearing a long hair is present above the lower ocellus of each series. Below the base of the antennae, there is a broad transverse depression. The clypeus is somewhat inflated in front of this depression, and the labral area gradually narrows, with a somewhat rounded apex.

=== Body ===
Bdellozonium cerviculatum reaches a maximum length of 16 mm and a width of 3.3 mm. It possesses a segmented body consisting of 39 to 46 segments. The dorsal region of the body exhibits a moderately convex shape, with the posterior end being more abruptly rounded compared to the anterior portion. The body cavity is approximately twice as wide as it is high. The body of B. cerviculatum is shiny and exhibits distinct characteristics along its segments. The first segment is small, measuring only about one-third the width of the full-sized segments. It is almost squarely truncated at the front and possesses a narrow raised rim. The posterior margin of the first segment is broadly and evenly rounded. The anterior subsegments are mostly smooth, with a few faint impressed longitudinal lines near the caudal margin. The posterior subsegments exhibit more pronounced impressed lines, deeper on the anterior third and becoming fainter toward the middle. The hind margin of the posterior subsegments is smooth. The exposed portion of the anterior subsegment is approximately one-third the length of the posterior subsegment. The hind margin of the middle body segments is slightly and broadly emarginate at the middle. Pores are located on the fifth segment, slightly above the posterior corner on the anterior subsegment, near the transverse sulcus. Other pores are situated on the posterior subsegments, closer to the transverse sulcus than to the lateral margin. The dorsal encroachment of the pleurae is minimal, forming a narrow raised lateral margin for each segment.

=== Legs ===
Bdellozonium cerviculatum possesses legs of notable length, almost reaching the sides of the body. The legs are slightly separated from each other by elevated sterna that form a depression open in front. The basal joints of the legs feature rounded-oval pits. In females, the first pair of legs is considerably small and slender, highly reduced compared to those of males, which are also smaller than the subsequent leg pairs.

=== Colouration ===
Living specimens of Bdellozonium cerviculatum display a distinctive salmon pink coloration on the dorsum, which tends to appear more brownish when preserved in alcohol. The side of each segment and the ventral surface exhibit a pale hue, while the head and antennae exhibit a light coloration with purplish mottling.
