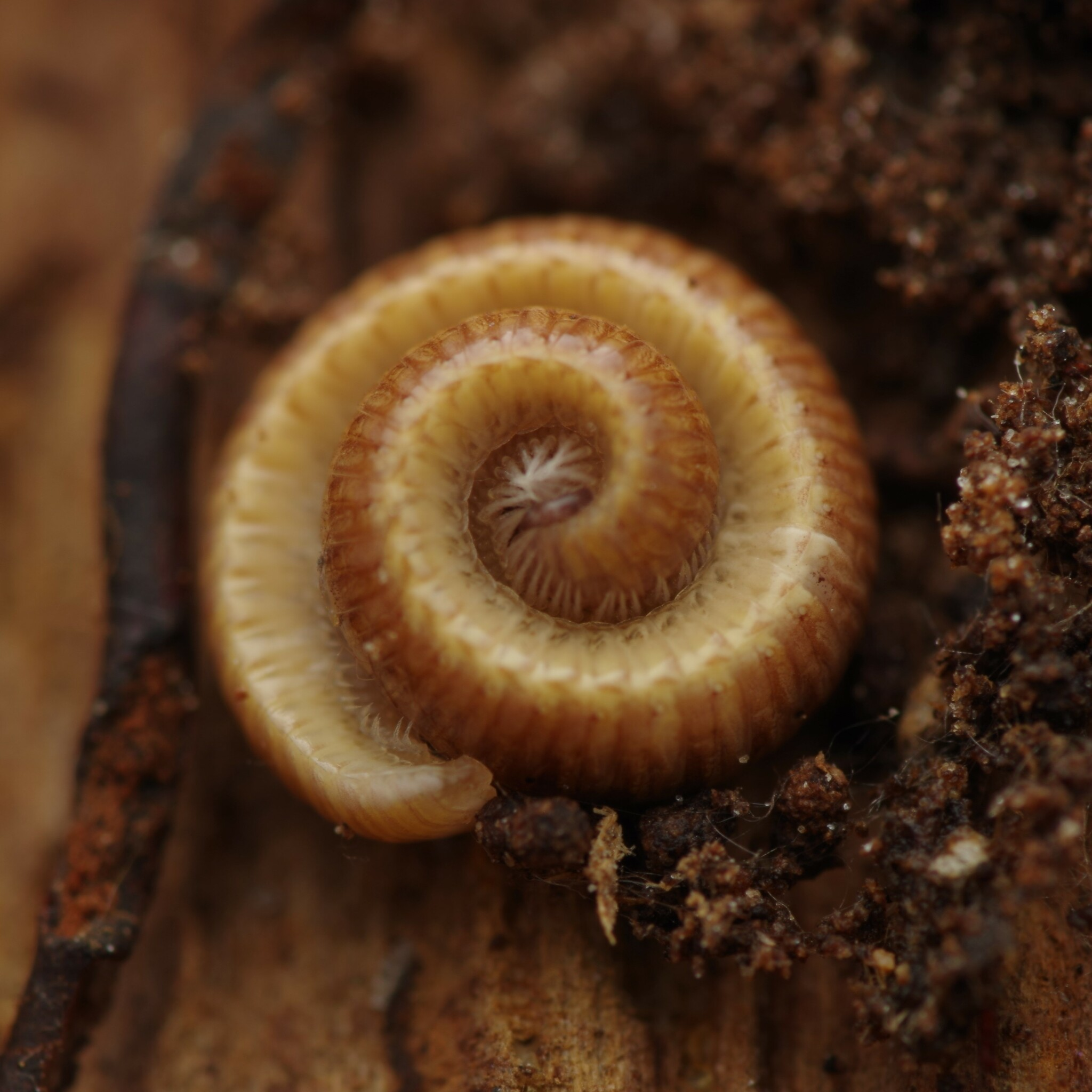
- Polyzonium germanicum

Scientific classification
- Domain: Eukaryota
- Kingdom: Animalia
- Phylum: Arthropoda
- Subphylum: Myriapoda
- Class: Diplopoda
- Order: Polyzoniida
- Family: Polyzoniidae
- Genus: Polyzonium; Brandt, 1837

Synonyms
- List: Platyiulus Gervais, 1836; Platyjulus Brandt, 1840; Platyulus Gervais, 1836

= Polyzonium =

Genus of millipede

Polyzonium is a genus of millipedes belonging to the family Polyzoniidae and order Polyzoniida.

== Distribution and habitat ==
The species of this genus are native to Europe, where they inhabit forested areas on limestone soils. P. germanicum possesses the widest distribution, being found in over 25 European countries. The other two species within the genus, P. eburneum and P. transsilvanicum are restricted to mountainous habitat such as the Eastern Alps and Carpathian Mountain range, with P. transsilvanicum possessing a locally endemic population in the Eastern Carpathian.

== Species list ==
The following species are recognised:

- Polyzonium eburneum Verhoeff, 1907
- Polyzonium germanicum Brandt, 1837
- Polyzonium transsilvanicum Verhoeff, 1898
