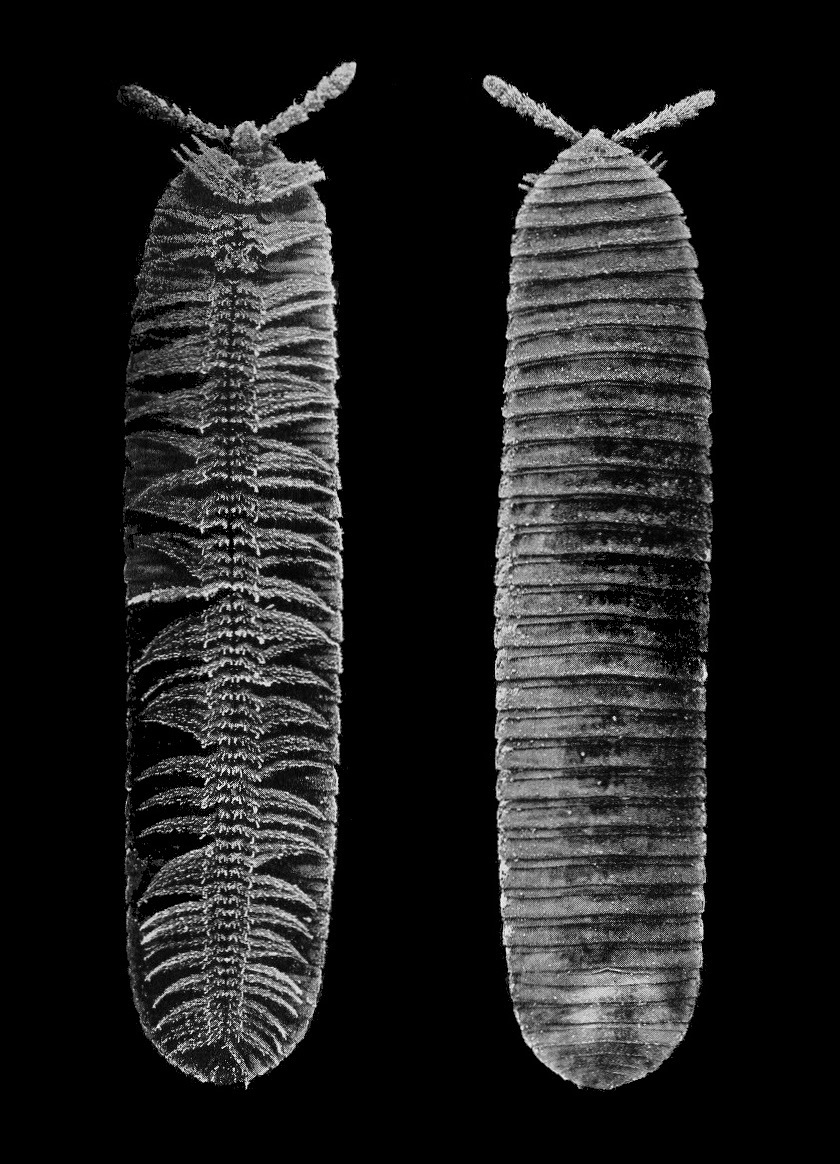

Scientific classification
- Domain: Eukaryota
- Kingdom: Animalia
- Phylum: Arthropoda
- Subphylum: Myriapoda
- Class: Diplopoda
- Order: Polyzoniida
- Family: Polyzoniidae
- Genus: Bdellozonium; Cook & Loomis, 1928

= Bdellozonium =

Genus of millipedes

Bdellozonium is a genus of millipedes in the family Polyzoniidae. There are at least two described species in Bdellozonium.

== Species ==
The following species are recognised:

- Bdellozonium cerviculatum Cook & Loomis, 1928
- Bdellozonium quicki (Chamberlin, 1954)
