= Petaserpes =

Scientific classification
- Domain: Eukaryota
- Kingdom: Animalia
- Phylum: Arthropoda
- Subphylum: Myriapoda
- Class: Diplopoda
- Order: Polyzoniida
- Family: Polyzoniidae
- Genus: Petaserpes; Cope, 1870

Genus of millipedes

Petaserpes is a genus of millipedes in the family Polyzoniidae. There are about six described species in Petaserpes.

== Species ==
These six species belong to the genus Petaserpes:

- Petaserpes bikermani (Causey, 1951)
- Petaserpes cryptocephalus (McNeill, 1887)
- Petaserpes lateralis (Shelley, 1976)
- Petaserpes mutabilis (Causey, 1951)
- Petaserpes rosalbus Cope, 1879
- Petaserpes strictus (Shelley, 1976)
