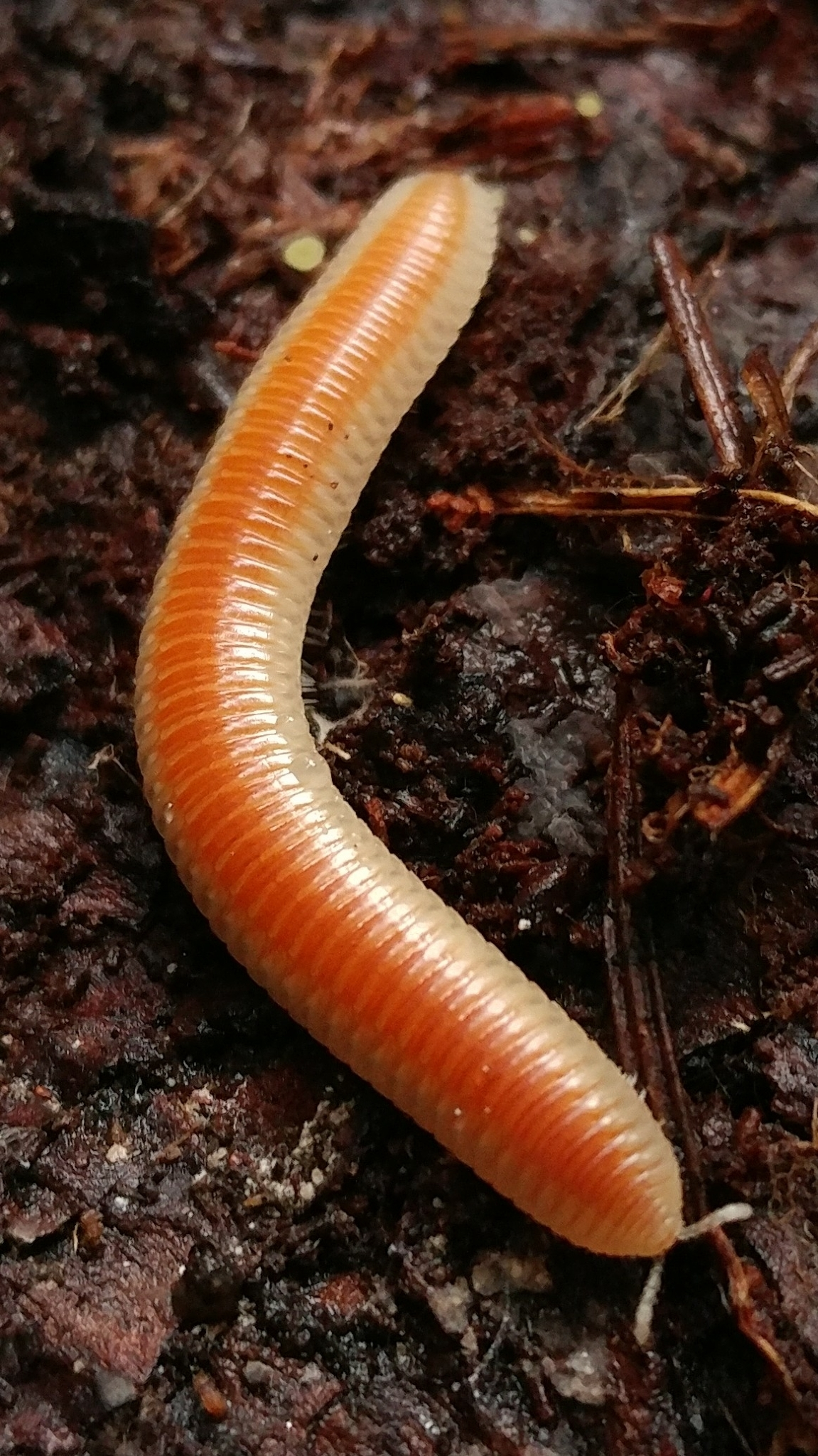
- Buzonium crassipes

Scientific classification
- Domain: Eukaryota
- Kingdom: Animalia
- Phylum: Arthropoda
- Subphylum: Myriapoda
- Class: Diplopoda
- Order: Polyzoniida
- Family: Polyzoniidae; Newport, 1844

= Polyzoniidae =

Family of millipedes

Polyzoniidae is a family of millipedes in the order Polyzoniida. There are about 9 genera and at least 60 described species in Polyzoniidae.

== Genera ==
The following Genera are recognised:

- Angarozonium Shelley, 1998
- Bdellozonium Cook & Loomis, 1928
- Buzonium Cook & Loomis, 1928
- Petaserpes Cope, 1870
- Polyzonium Brandt, 1837
- Stenozonium Shelley, 1998
