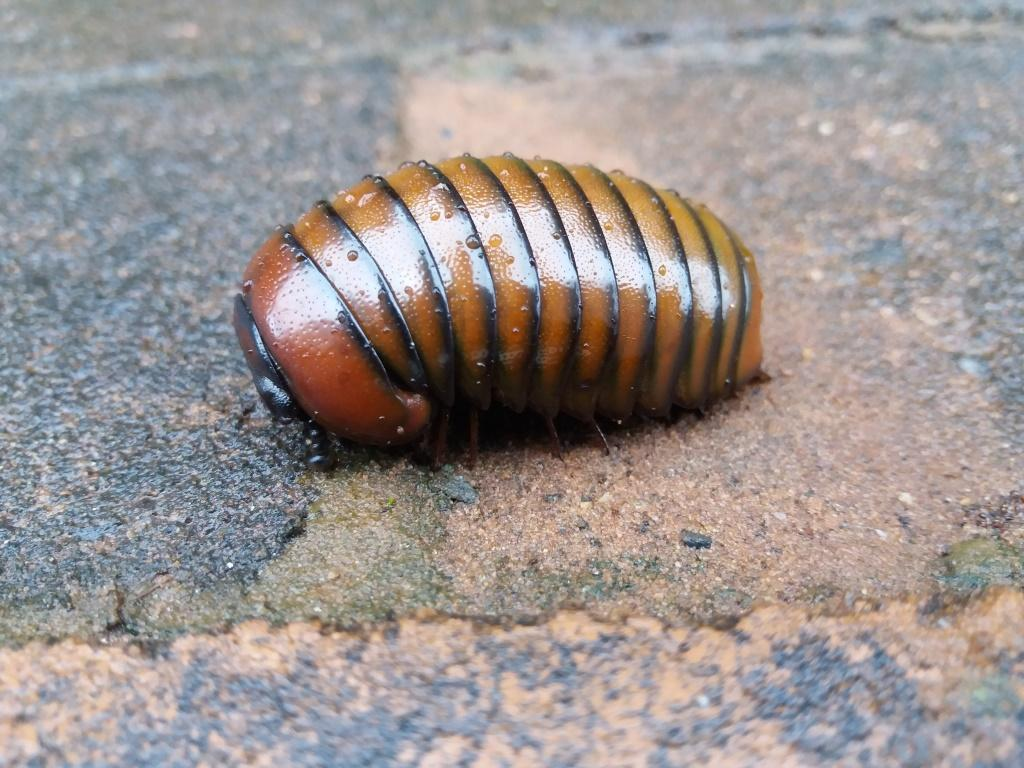

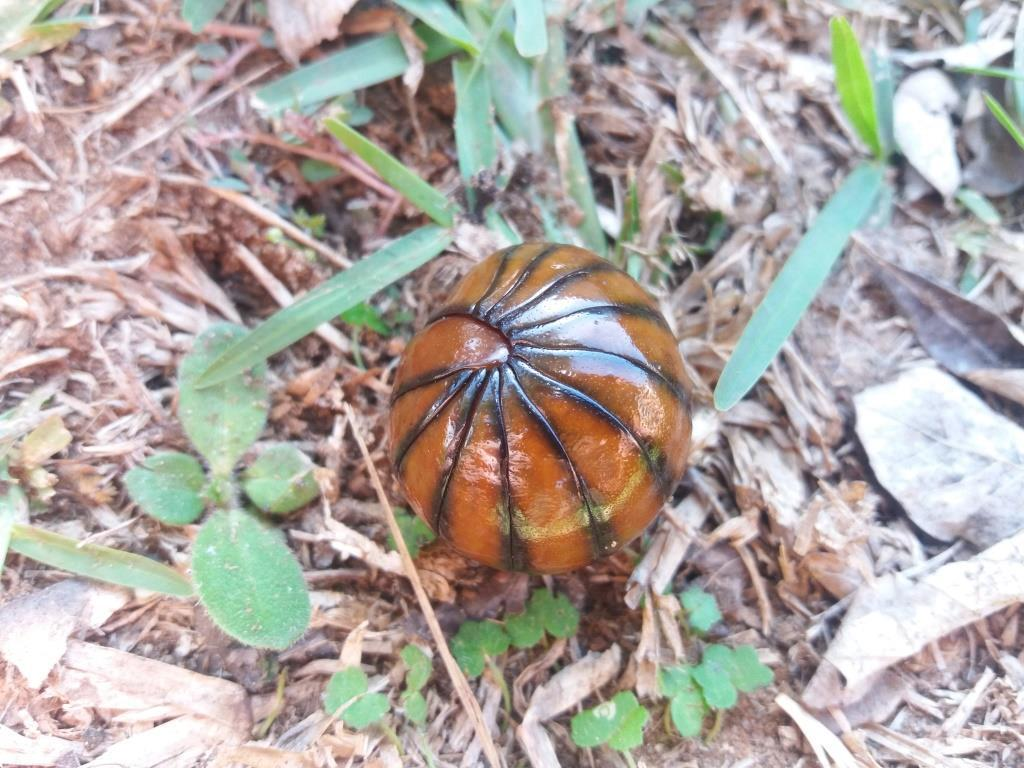

Scientific classification
- Kingdom: Animalia
- Phylum: Arthropoda
- Subphylum: Myriapoda
- Class: Diplopoda
- Order: Sphaerotheriida
- Family: Sphaerotheriidae
- Genus: Sphaerotherium
- Species: S. giganteum

Binomial name
- Sphaerotherium giganteum Porat, 1872

= Sphaerotherium giganteum =

Largest species of pill-millipede endemic to South Africa

Sphaerotherium giganteum (the giant pill millipede) is a species of southern African pill millipede in the family Sphaerotheriidae.

== Description ==
The giant pill millipede is the largest species of pill millipede in South Africa. Its length is 5 cm, with the body segmented into 11–13 segments. Each segment has two pairs of legs, for a total of about 42 legs.

== Habitat and range ==
The giant pill millipede is found in moist forest habitat under leaf litter in South Africa. It is widely distributed in high-altitude forested areas in Kwa-Zulu Natal, Limpopo, Mpumalanga and the Eastern Cape.

== Ecology ==
The giant pill millipede feeds on decaying matter on the forest floor. The carnivorous slug, Chlamydephorus, is known to prey on S. giganteum in the coastal forests of KZN.

== Conservation status ==
The population number of Sphaerotherium giganteum has not been determined, and it is not formally protected. Sphaerotherium giganteum may be vulnerable to habitat loss and degradation, as well as exploitation in the pet trade and in traditional medicine.
