= Haasea hungarica =

Scientific classification
- Kingdom: Animalia
- Phylum: Arthropoda
- Subphylum: Myriapoda
- Class: Diplopoda
- Order: Chordeumatida
- Family: Haaseidae
- Genus: Haasea
- Species: H. hungarica

Binomial name
- Haasea hungarica (Verhoeff, 1928)

Synonyms
- Orobainosoma hungaricum Verhoeff, 1928

Species of millipede

Haasea hungarica is a species of millipede in the family Haaseidae. This species is a eutroglophile, capable of spending its entire life cycle in a cave but also capable of living on the surface outside of caves. Although these millipedes are often found in caves, this species has also been found on the soil surface in forests.

== Discovery ==
The German zoologist Karl W. Verhoeff first described this species in 1928 based on specimens including adults of both sexes and one juvenile. These specimens were collected from Abaligeti Cave in Hungary. The Hungarian zoologist Elemér Bokor found the first of several specimens collected from this cave in 1922. The type specimens include five syntypes deposited as intact specimens in the Hungarian Natural History Museum in Budapest as well as type material deposited in the form of slides in the Zoologische Staatssammlung München and the Museum für Naturkunde Berlin, both in Germany. No lectotype has been designated.

== Distribution ==
Authorities initially believed this species to be endemic to Abaligeti Cave, where this millipede was found in the deepest part of the main passage and in a hall 300 m below the surface. In the decades after the discovery of this species, however, more finds were reported later in other locations in Hungary. These finds include the discovery of epigean populations, for example, in forest litter in the Kőszeg mountains, on Tubes peak in the Mecsek mountains, and in the Dráva region, as well as finds in other caves. Once thought to be endemic to Hungary, this species has also been identified among specimens collected in Romania, Austria, Slovenia, and Serbia, expanding the known distribution of this species across the Carpathian basin. The range of this species extends from the Styrian mountains, across low mountains and forests in the Pannonian Plain, to the Banat mountains and Southern Carpathians in Romania.

== Taxonomy ==
Verhoeff originally described this species in 1928 under the name Orobainosoma hungaricum. In 1971, however, the Dutch myriapodologist Casimir Albrecht Willem Jeekel recognized the validity of Haasea as a genus. Authorities have since deemed Orobainosoma to be junior synonym of Haasea and now consider Haasea hungarica the accepted name for this species.

In 1965, the Romanian zoologist Ionel Tabaracu described Orobainosoma hungaricum orientale as a new subspecies based on specimens collected from caves in the Banat and Oltenia regions in Romania. Some authorities still accept this subspecies as valid. Others find the minor differences in morphology cited by Tabaracu to be too variable and therefore deem Orobainosoma hungaricum orientale to be a junior synonym of Haasea hungarica.

== Description ==
Adults in this species range from 8.5 mm to 10 mm in length. The body is yellowish white, but the dorsal surface is a reddish or yellowish brown. This millipede has only 28 segments in adults (counting the collum as the first segment and the telson as the last) rather than the 30 usually found in adults in the order Chordeumatida. Accordingly, adult females of this species have only 46 pairs of legs, and adult males have only 44 pairs of walking legs (excluding the eight and ninth leg pairs, which become gonopods).

This millipede can be distinguished from all other species in the genus Haasea based on the unique structures on the anterior gonopods in males. In particular, in H. hungarica the posterior lamella on these gonopods feature a distal notch. Among all the other species in the genus Haasea, only the species H. flavescens shares this trait with H. hungarica. In H. hungarica, however, the posterior lamella is larger and features a proximal protrusion, whereas in H. flavescens, the posterior lamella is smaller, and this protrusion is absent. Furthermore, H. flavescens usually features the 30 segments typically observed in the order Chordeumatida, whereas H. hungarica has only 28 segments.

== Development ==
This species arrives at lower numbers of segments and legs through a process of post-embryonic development that deviates from the anamorphosis usually observed in the order Chordeumatida. Like other species in this order, H. hungarica is teloanamorphic, adding segments and legs through a series of molts until the adult stage, when the molting stops and the adult emerges with a final number of segments and legs. This species, however, reaches maturity and stops molting one stage earlier, in the eighth stage rather than in a ninth stage. Furthermore, the males of this species begin to develop gonopods one stage earlier, in the sixth stage rather than in the seventh stage.
