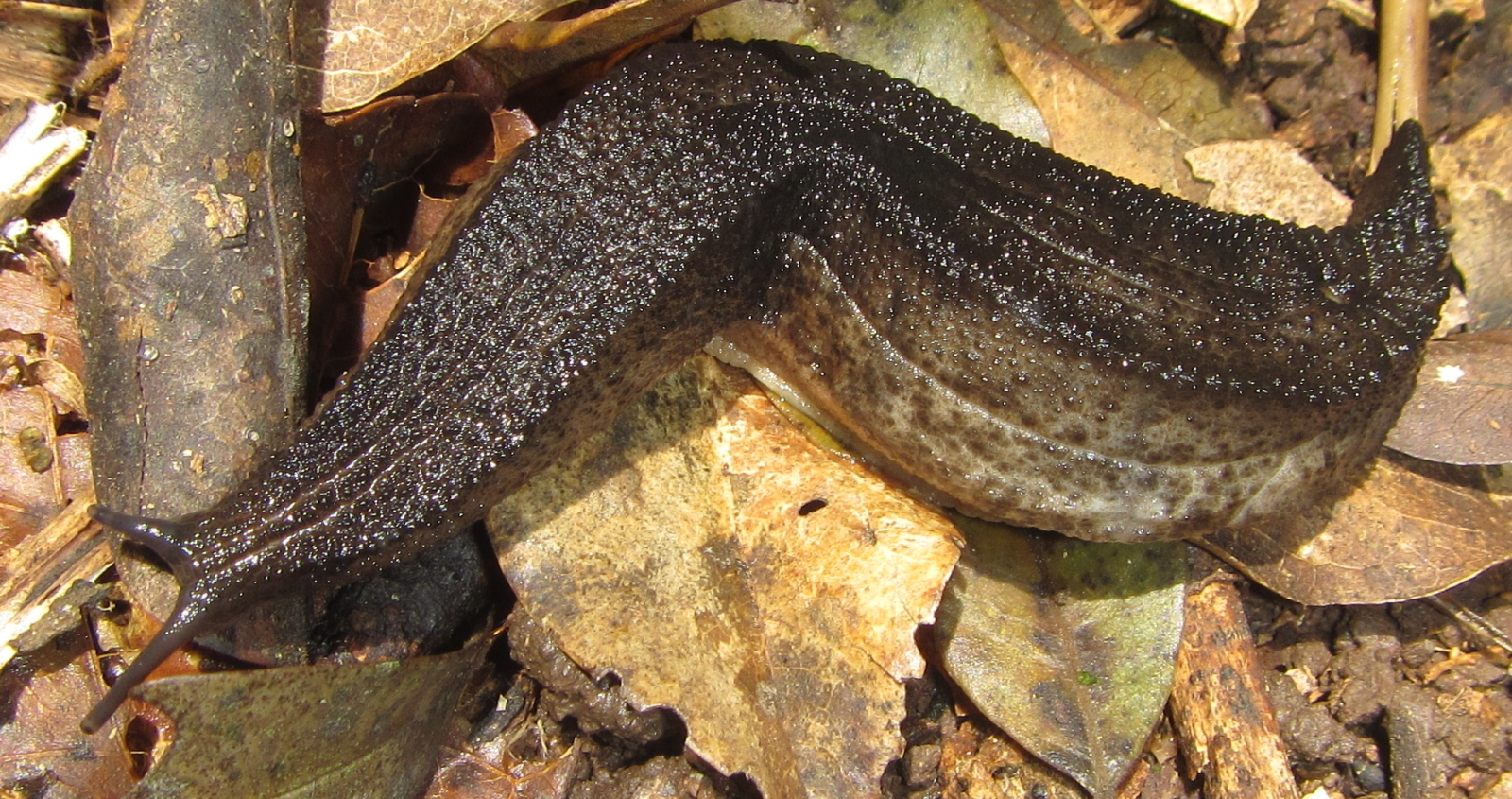

Scientific classification
- Kingdom: Animalia
- Phylum: Mollusca
- Class: Gastropoda
- Order: Stylommatophora
- Family: Rhytididae
- Genus: Chlamydephorus
- Species: C. sexangulus

Binomial name
- Chlamydephorus sexangulus (H.Watson, 1915)

Synonyms
- Apera sexangula H. Watson, 1915 superseded combination

= Chlamydephorus sexangulus =

Predatory slug endemic to KZN, South Africa

Chlamydephorus sexangulus, also known as the hexagonal hunterslug, is a species of predatory slug in the family Rhytididae.

== Description ==
The animal is slender, with a body approximately hexagonal in cross-section due to four prominent longitudinal keels (dorsal grooves) — two on each side. The upper keels are separated by about three-fifths of the body’s width and run nearly parallel, diverging slightly just in front of the respiratory opening before converging posteriorly into a short median keel (3–4 mm in length). The lower keels extend the full body length, situated halfway between the upper keels and the edges of the foot, sloping downward towards the posterior.

When in motion, the areas between the keels are nearly flat, but upon contraction, they become deeply concave. Seen dorsally, the body tapers to an acute posterior angle, but viewed laterally, the hind end appears more blunted due to the median keel (less rounded than in certain figures). The outer lip of the respiratory opening is narrow, exposing the inner lip. The rugae (small, ridge-like structures or wrinkles found on the skin or body surface) are finely subdivided.

Dorsal grooves are prominent, spaced roughly 1 mm apart and separated by a single row of rugae, which becomes irregularly double towards the middle. These grooves converge slightly towards the respiratory opening without fully uniting. The lateral grooves are also conspicuous, running along each side of the body to the head, halfway between the upper and lower keels. The right lateral groove terminates at the genital opening. Sub-lateral grooves are few and irregular, with only two to three traceable on each side. Radial grooves are well-defined, intersecting the keels and forming slight notches. Both radial and sub-lateral grooves terminate in a longitudinal groove parallel to the peripodial groove, separated by a narrow row of rugae.

The body colouration consists of greyish-brown mottling, more concentrated towards the posterior and along the sides below the upper keels, extending down to the peripodial groove. Minute reddish-brown specks are scattered across the body and sparsely present on the foot-sole. Preserved specimens exhibit a yellowish-white ground colour with a faint dorsal reddish tint. In life, however, the animal’s skin shows a deeper dull-red pigment, resulting in a chestnut or reddish-brown appearance, which is paler along the keels and foot.

== Distribution ==
This snail is endemic to the KwaZulu-Natal coastal lowland forests in South Africa.

== Habitat and range ==
Chlamydephorus sexangulus has been found under leaf litter and under large stone in coastal Podocarpus forests in KZN; it has also been found in thornveld.

== Ecology ==
Chlamydephorus sexangulus is known to predate on species of Sphaerotherium such as Sphaerotherium giganteum.
