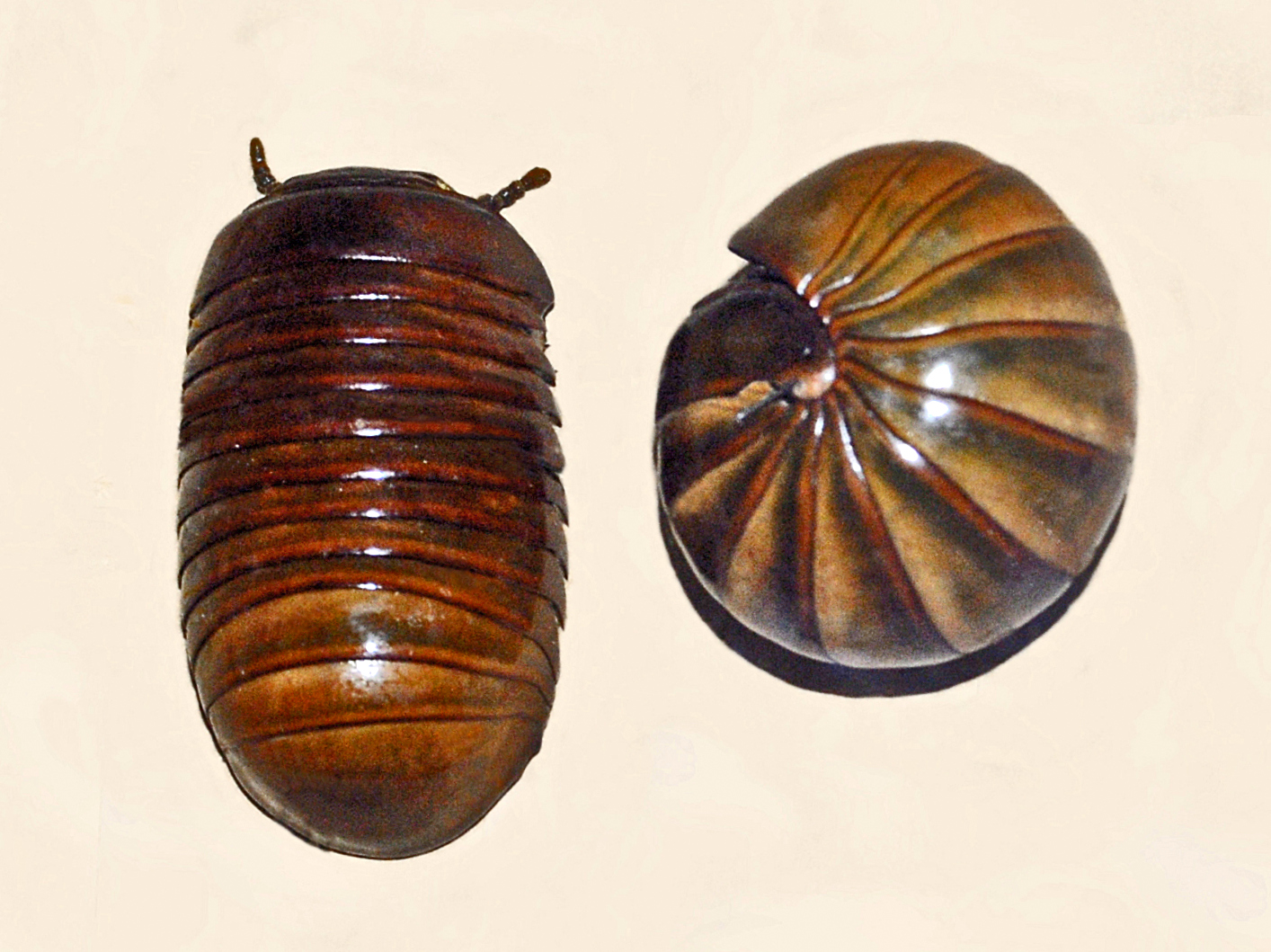
- Sphaeropoeus hercules from Sumatra

Scientific classification
- Kingdom: Animalia
- Phylum: Arthropoda
- Subphylum: Myriapoda
- Class: Diplopoda
- Order: Sphaerotheriida
- Family: Zephroniidae
- Genus: Sphaeropoeus
- Species: S. hercules

Binomial name
- Sphaeropoeus hercules Brandt, 1833

= Sphaeropoeus hercules =

Species of millipede

Sphaeropoeus hercules is a species of giant pill millipede belonging to the family Zephroniidae.

== Distribution ==
This species can be found in Sumatra.

== Bibliography ==
- Pocock, Reginald Innes (1894) Chilopoda, Symphyla and Diplopoda from the Malay Archipelago, In: Weber, M.: Zoologische Ergebnisse einer Reise in Niederländisch Ost-Indien, Band 3: 307–404.
- Jeekel, Casimir Albrecht Willem (2001) A bibliographic catalogue of the Asiatic Sphaerotheriida (Diplopoda), Myriapod memoranda, 3: 5-38: 5-38.
- Jeekel, Casimir Albrecht Willem (1971) Nomenclator generum et familiarum Diplopodorum: A list of the genus and family-group names in the Class Diplopoda from the 10th edition of Linnaeus, 1758, to the end of 1957, Monografieen van de Nederlandse Entomologische Vereniging, 5: 1-412: 1–412.
- SysMyr: Systematic Myriapod Database. Spelda J., 2008-12-29
