= Haasea =

Scientific classification
- Kingdom: Animalia
- Phylum: Arthropoda
- Subphylum: Myriapoda
- Class: Diplopoda
- Order: Chordeumatida
- Family: Haaseidae
- Genus: Haasea; Verhoeff, 1895

Type species
- Craspedosoma flavescens Latzel, 1884

Synonyms
- Xiphogona Cook, 1895; Orobainosoma Verhoeff, 1897; Rhopalogona Silvestri, 1898; Deuterohaasea Verhoeff, 1898

Genus of millipede

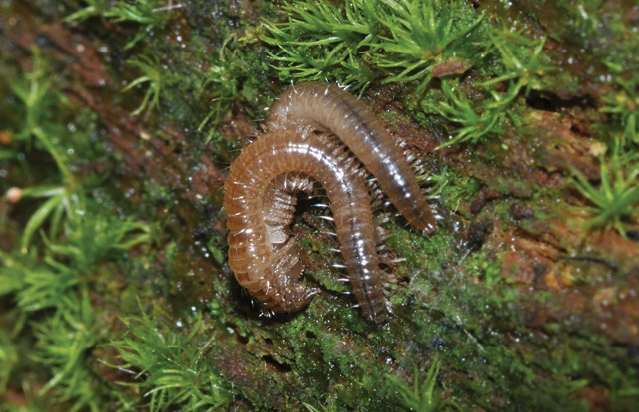
A pair of Haasea flavescens

Haasea is a genus of millipedes in the family Haaseidae. This genus is the largest in this family, with 17 accepted species. Millipedes in this genus have either 28 or 30 segments (counting the collum as the first segment and the telson as the last).

== Distribution ==
Millipedes in this genus are widespread in central Europe, with a distribution across about 650 km from the Harz mountains in northern Germany down to the Durmitor massif in Montenegro, and from Luxembourg and the French-Swiss border across to the Eastern Carpathian mountains in Romania. Most species appear in the Alps and the Dinarides, also extending to the Bohemian massif, the Ore mountains, the Sudeten mountains, and both the Western and Eastern Carpathian mountains, across the Pannonian Basin, and to the Southern Carpathian mountains and the Balkan mountains. Although these millipedes are found in most of the Alps, they are absent from the Western Alps, including the Pennine Alps.

== Taxonomy ==
The German zoologist Karl W. Verhoeff first proposed Haasea in 1895 as a subgenus in the genus Craspedosoma to contain three species, including C. flavescens. Later in same year, however, the American biologists Orator F. Cook and Guy N. Collins instead proposed Xiphogona as a genus for C. flavescens, which they designated as the type species. Verhoeff responded in 1897 by proposing Orobainosoma as a genus for the same species. In 1898, the Italian zoologist Filippo Silvestri proposed Rhopalogona as a genus to replace Haasea. More names and confusion followed, until the Dutch myriapodologist Casimir Albrecht Willem Jeekel recognized the validity of Haasea as a genus with Haasea flavescens as the type species in 1971. Authorities have since deemed all the other names proposed for this genus to be junior synonyms of Haasea.

== Description ==
Species in this genus have 28 or 30 segments and range from 6.5 mm to 12 mm in length. They vary in pigmentation, ranging from poorly pigmented to light or dark brown, but most species are a yellowish brown. Diagnostic features include the reduced size of the tenth leg pair in males compared to the other walking legs. Furthermore, the coxal processes of the posterior gonopods in the male have two or three branches rather than being unipartite.

== Species ==
This genus includes 17 species:

- Haasea cyanopida (Attems, 1903)
- Haasea faucium (Verhoeff, 1931)
- Haasea filicis (Verhoeff, 1929)
- Haasea flavescens (Latzel, 1884)
- Haasea fonticulorum (Verhoeff, 1910)
- Haasea germanica (Verhoeff, 1901)
- Haasea gruberi Antić & Akkari, 2020
- Haasea hungarica (Verhoeff, 1928)
- Haasea inflata (Verhoeff, 1907)
- Haasea intermedia Mršić, 1985
- Haasea lacusnigri (Gulička, 1968)
- Haasea makarovi Antić & Akkari, 2020
- Haasea microcorna (Strasser, 1971)
- Haasea musimontium (Strasser, 1937)
- Haasea plasana (Verhoeff, 1899)
- Haasea pretneri (Strasser, 1966)
- Haasea vidinensis (Strasser, 1973)
