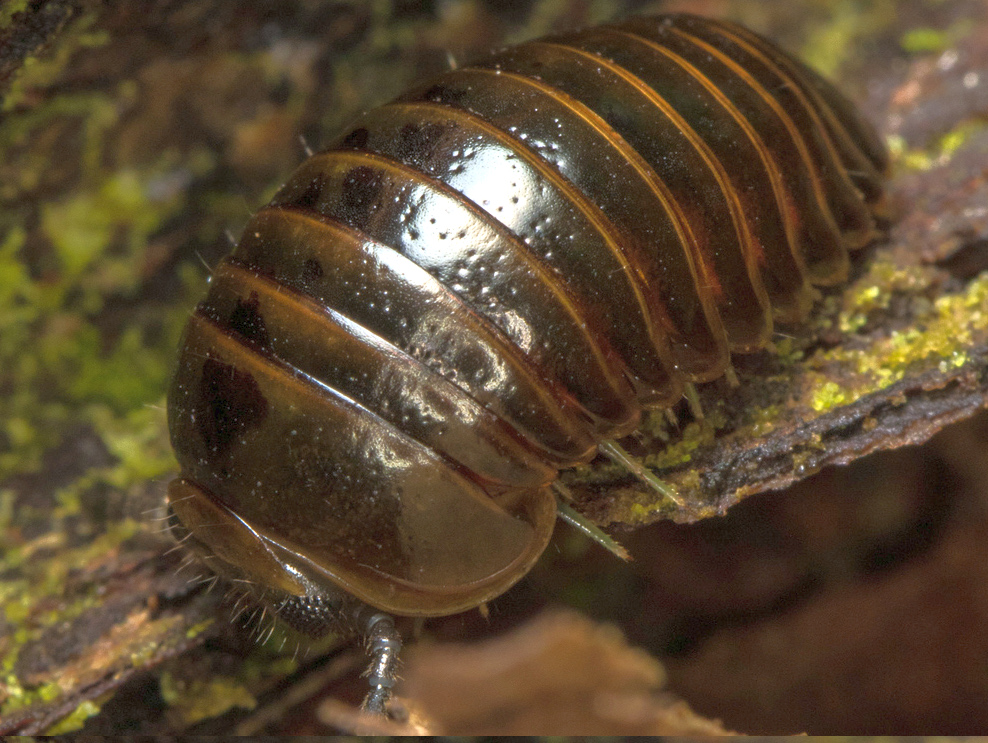
- Procyliosoma delacyi

Scientific classification
- Kingdom: Animalia
- Phylum: Arthropoda
- Subphylum: Myriapoda
- Class: Diplopoda
- Order: Sphaerotheriida
- Family: Procyliosomatidae; Wesener & VandenSpiegel, 2009
- Genus: Procyliosoma; Silvestri, 1917

Type species
- Procyliosoma leae Silvestri, 1917

= Procyliosoma =

Genus of millipedes

Procyliosoma is a genus of pill millipede found in Australia and New Zealand. Formerly classified in the family Sphaerotheriidae, in 2009 Procyliosoma was reclassified as the only genus in the family Procyliosomatidae.

== Species ==
- Procyliosoma andersoni (Verhoeff, 1928) – New South Wales
- Procyliosoma aurivillii Silvestri, 1917 – Queensland
- Procyliosoma castaneum (Verhoeff, 1924) – Queensland
- Procyliosoma delacyi (White, 1859) – New Zealand
- Procyliosoma dorrigense (Verhoeff, 1928) – New South Wales
- Procyliosoma leae Silvestri, 1917 – Tasmania
- Procyliosoma leiosomum Hutton, 1877 – New Zealand
- Procyliosoma tasmanicum Silvestri, 1917 – Tasmania
- Procyliosoma tuberculatum Silvestri, 1917 – New Zealand
- Procyliosoma walesianum (Karsch, 1881) – New South Wales
