= Chlamydephorus burnupi =

Conservation status
- Vulnerable (IUCN 2.3)

Scientific classification
- Kingdom: Animalia
- Phylum: Mollusca
- Class: Gastropoda
- Order: Stylommatophora
- Family: Rhytididae
- Genus: Chlamydephorus
- Species: C. burnupi

Binomial name
- Chlamydephorus burnupi (Smith, 1892)

Species of gastropod

Chlamydephorus burnupi, the camel huntingslug or Burnup's hunter slug, is a species of land slug in the family Chlamydephoridae. It is endemic to South Africa, where it is known from the foothills of central Natal Drakensberg to Port St. Johns.

== Description ==
It is orange to reddish-brown and around 8 cm when extended. It has distinct scalloped keels along the side of its body with a flattened lower dorsal side, in the center of which is the respiratory opening. The body has a hump two-thirds of the way down.

== Habitat and ecology ==
It is found under stones or logs in leaf-litter in mist-belt Podocarpus forest. It is known to prey on pill-millipedes, possibly by introducing a toxin that immobilizes them. Snails and earthworms may also be part of its diet.

== Conservation ==
In June 2000, the species was listed as Vulnerable on the IUCN Red List, citing fragmented populations and decline of habitat.
