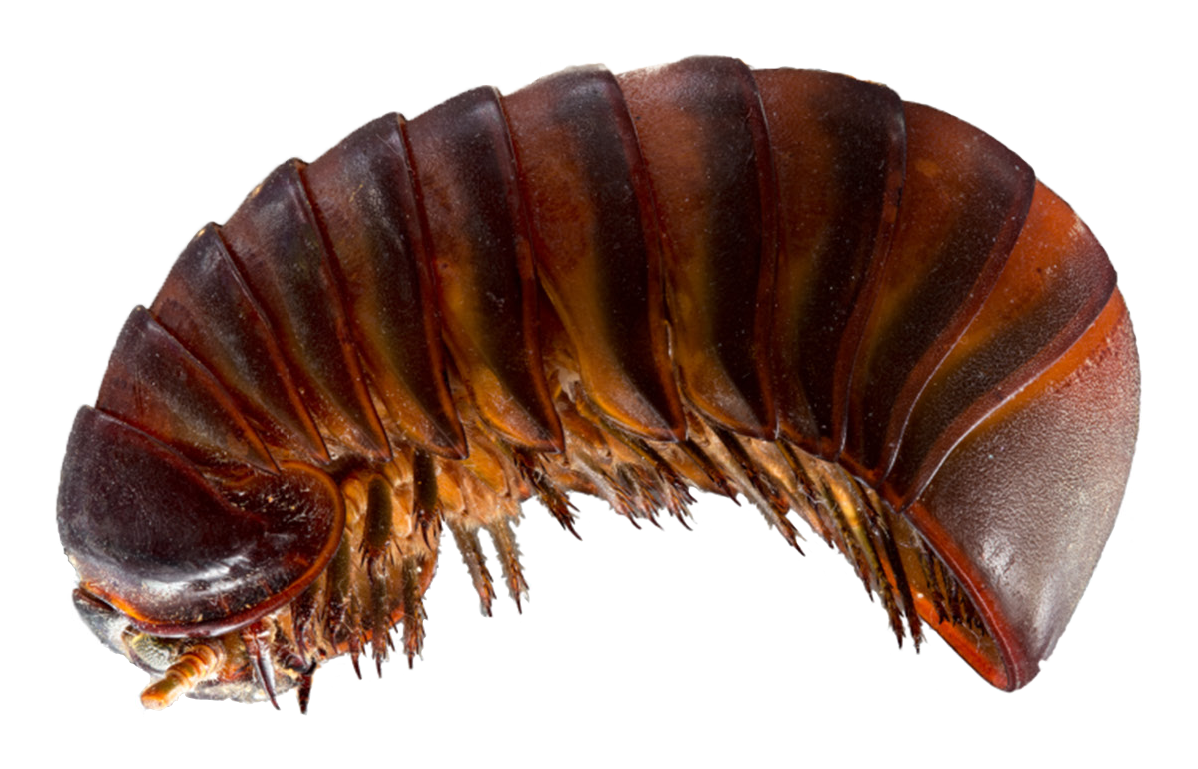
- Sphaerobelum aesculus

Scientific classification
- Kingdom: Animalia
- Phylum: Arthropoda
- Subphylum: Myriapoda
- Class: Diplopoda
- Order: Sphaerotheriida
- Family: Zephroniidae
- Genus: Sphaerobelum; Verhoeff, 1924

Type species
- Sphaerobelum clavigerum Verhoeff, 1924

= Sphaerobelum =

Genus of millipedes

Sphaerobelum is a genus of giant pill-millipedes in the family Zephroniidae, endemic to Southeast Asia, with most species occurring in Thailand, Laos and Vietnam. Members of this genus are characterised by volvation, jewel-like coloration and distinct morphological adaptations. Several species are restricted to limestone karsts and forested habitats and recent molecular studies confirm the genus' distinctness from closely related genera such as Zephronia.

== Description ==
Sphaerobelum are medium to large-sized millipedes, capable of rolling into a tight ball when threatened which is a typical trait of the order Sphaerotheriida. Their bodies consist tergites, with a glossy exoskeleton that may exhibit colors such as turquoise and dark green depending on species. The also have ocelli and their antennae may be short and club-shaped. They have posterior telopods, with four podomeres and a large process on the second podomere with a large tip.

Sexual dimorphism is slightly evident in some species, particularly in the shape and size of the anal shields. The surface texture of the tergites ranges from smooth to hairy. The posterior margin of the collum are often diagnostic at the species level.

Additionally, male Sphaerobelums can be differentiated from other giant pill-millipede genera by the distally swollen process of the second joint of the posterior telopod.

== Taxonomy ==
The genus was first described by Karl Wilhelm Verhoeff in 1924. Sphaerobelum belongs to family Zephroniidae, which includes species known for their ability to roll into tight spheres as a defense mechanism.

=== Recognised species ===
As of 2025, the genus includes at least 27 recognised species:

- Sphaerobelum aesculus Rosenmejer & Wesener, 2021
- Sphaerobelum benqii Liu & Wesener, 2022
- Sphaerobelum bicorne Attems, 1938
- Sphaerobelum bolavensis Wesener, 2019
- Sphaerobelum cattiense Semenyuk, Golovatch & Wesener, 2018
- Sphaerobelum clavigerum Verhoeff, 1924 (type species)
- Sphaerobelum denticulatum Wesener, 2019
- Sphaerobelum hirsutum Verhoeff, 1924
- Sphaerobelum huzhengkuni Zhao, Yu & W. Liu, 2020
- Sphaerobelum konkakinhense Golovatch & Wesener, 2018
- Sphaerobelum lachneeis Wesener, 2019
- Sphaerobelum laoticum Wesener, 2019
- Sphaerobelum meridionalis Bhansali & Wesener, 2022
- Sphaerobelum nigrum Wesener, 2019
- Sphaerobelum nonghinensis Srikampha & Srisonchai, 2025
- Sphaerobelum onyx Srikampha & Srisonchai, 2025
- Sphaerobelum peterjaegeri Wesener, 2019
- Sphaerobelum petramurum Srikampha & Srisonchai, 2025
- Sphaerobelum phouloei Wesener, 2019
- Sphaerobelum pumatense Semenyuk, Golovatch & Wesener, 2020
- Sphaerobelum schwendingeri Wesener, 2019
- Sphaerobelum separatum Attems, 1953
- Sphaerobelum spinatum Wesener, 2019
- Sphaerobelum splendidum Wesener, 2019
- Sphaerobelum truncatum Wongthamwanich, 2012
- Sphaerobelum tujiaphilum Zhao & Liu, 2022
- Sphaerobelum turcosa Srisonchai & Pimvichai, 2023

== Ecology and behavior ==
Sphaerobelum are often associated with humid forest floors and limestone karsts. Many are endemic to single localities. For instance, Sphaerobelum truncatum is found in Nan Province, Northern Thailand, while Sphaerobelum turcosa is limited to Phu Pha Lom Forest Park in Loei Province.

== Genetics ==
Molecular phylogenetic studies using mitochondrial COI gene sequences reveal significant genetic divergence between species of Sphaerobelum and other genera in Zephroniidae. The genus is genetically distinct from both Zephronia and other sphaerotheriid genera, with intergeneric distances reaching up to 32% in uncorrected p-distance.

== Distribution ==
The genus is primarily distributed across Southeast Asia, especially in Thailand and Laos and Vietnam.
