= Cyliosomatidae =

Scientific classification
- Kingdom: Animalia
- Phylum: Arthropoda
- Subphylum: Myriapoda
- Class: Diplopoda
- Order: Sphaerotheriida
- Family: Cyliosomatidae; Jeekel, 1974

Family of giant millipedes

Cyliosomatidae is a family of giant millipedes in the order Sphaerotheriida, found in Australia. First described in 1974 by C. A. W. Jeekel. Two genera are known:

- Cynotelopus
- Cyliosoma
