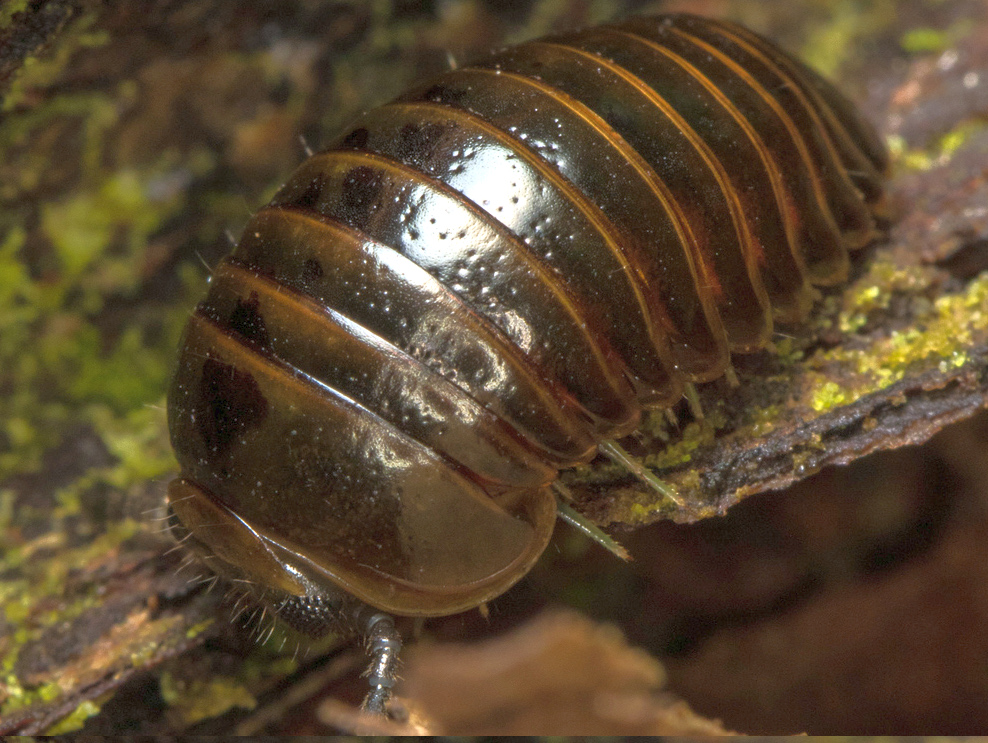

Scientific classification
- Kingdom: Animalia
- Phylum: Arthropoda
- Subphylum: Myriapoda
- Class: Diplopoda
- Order: Sphaerotheriida
- Family: Procyliosomatidae
- Genus: Procyliosoma
- Species: P. delacyi

Binomial name
- Procyliosoma delacyi (White, 1859)

Synonyms
- Zephronia delacyi White, 1859

= Procyliosoma delacyi =

Species of millipede

Procyliosoma delacyi is a species of giant pill millipede found in New Zealand.

== Distribution ==
Procyliosoma delacyi is found in Nelson and Waikato.

== Taxonomy ==
The species was originally named Zephronia De Lacyi, in honour of the discoverer's brother-in-law, one Mr. De Lacy, "a gentleman very fond of natural history, and who studies it in his New Zealand home." It was described in 1859, and was the first pill millipede described from New Zealand. The scientist who discovered it, Adam White, noted that "it is a pretty and very distinct species, the first I have seen from New Zealand".

There are two subspecies, Procyliosoma delacyi delacyi and P. delacyi striolatum.

== Description ==
Procyliosoma delacyi is a "very highly polished" pill millipede, with a "few scattered punctures on each segment". Preserved specimens are greyish-green to light brown in colour.
