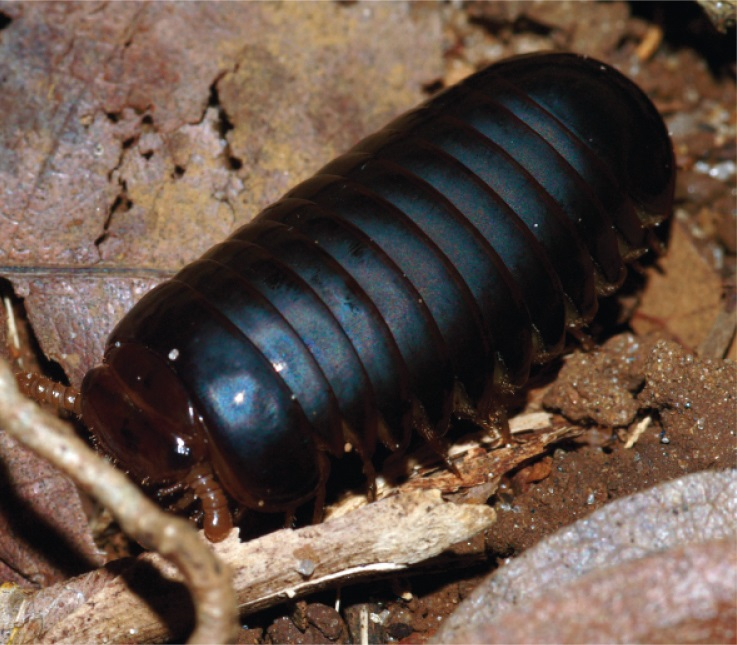
- Sphaeromimus andohahela

Scientific classification
- Kingdom: Animalia
- Phylum: Arthropoda
- Subphylum: Myriapoda
- Class: Diplopoda
- Order: Sphaerotheriida
- Family: Arthrosphaeridae
- Genus: Sphaeromimus; Saussure & Zehntner, 1902

Species
- See text

= Sphaeromimus =

Genus of millipedes

Sphaeromimus (Latin: sphere mimic), or the chirping giant pill millipedes, is a genus of giant pill millipedes (order Sphaerotheriida) endemic to southeastern Madagascar. Though described in 1902, the genus was up to 2005 known from a single male specimen, whose appearance was so unusual that the authors suspected a mislabeled giant pill-millipede from India. Their unusual and distinct morphology includes well-developed stridulation organs, probably as devices for courtship. These are the male ‘harp’ and the female ‘washboard’, which contain more stridulation ribs than in other members of the order Sphaerotheriida. They have a closer affinity with the Indian genus Arthrosphaera than to other Malagasy genera, though all belong to the Arthrosphaeridae.

== Relationships ==
It belongs to the family Arthrosphaeridae, which besides Sphaeromimus includes the Malagasy genera Zoosphaerium and Microsphaerotherium, and the Indian genus Arthrosphaera. Recent research has shown that Sphaeromimus is more closely related to the Indian genus Arthrosphaera than to the other Malagasy genera.

== Habitat ==
All populations inhabit the leaf litter of the Malagasy rainforests, except for one recently described species (2014) which was found in a cave and the type species S. musicus which has only been found in the dry spiny forest. Recent research has shown that Sphaeromimus populations are highly endemic, since individuals are not able to travel between forest patches. Movement between populations is becoming more limited, as forest is being destroyed at a rapid rate on Madagascar.

== Habits ==
Like other giant pill-millipedes, Sphaeromimus individuals can roll up into a ball for protection. The size of this ball is typically equal to that of a ping-pong ball and can sometimes even be larger. Males have a structure on their anterior telopod, known as the harp, which has several stridulation ribs and is able to produce sounds when rubbed against a sclerotized knob on the leg. They probably use this structure during courtship in order to prevent females from rolling up into a ball. When a female is receptive, it is believed that males use the posterior telopod in order to hold females down for copulation. Females, on the other hand, have a structure on their subanal plate called the washboard, which, like the male harp, contains stridulation ribs and produces sounds. The harp and washboard are present in all species of the family Arthrosphaeridae but are especially well developed in Sphaeromimus, with males having 3–7 ribs on each harp, and females 8–16 ribs on each washboard.

== Species ==
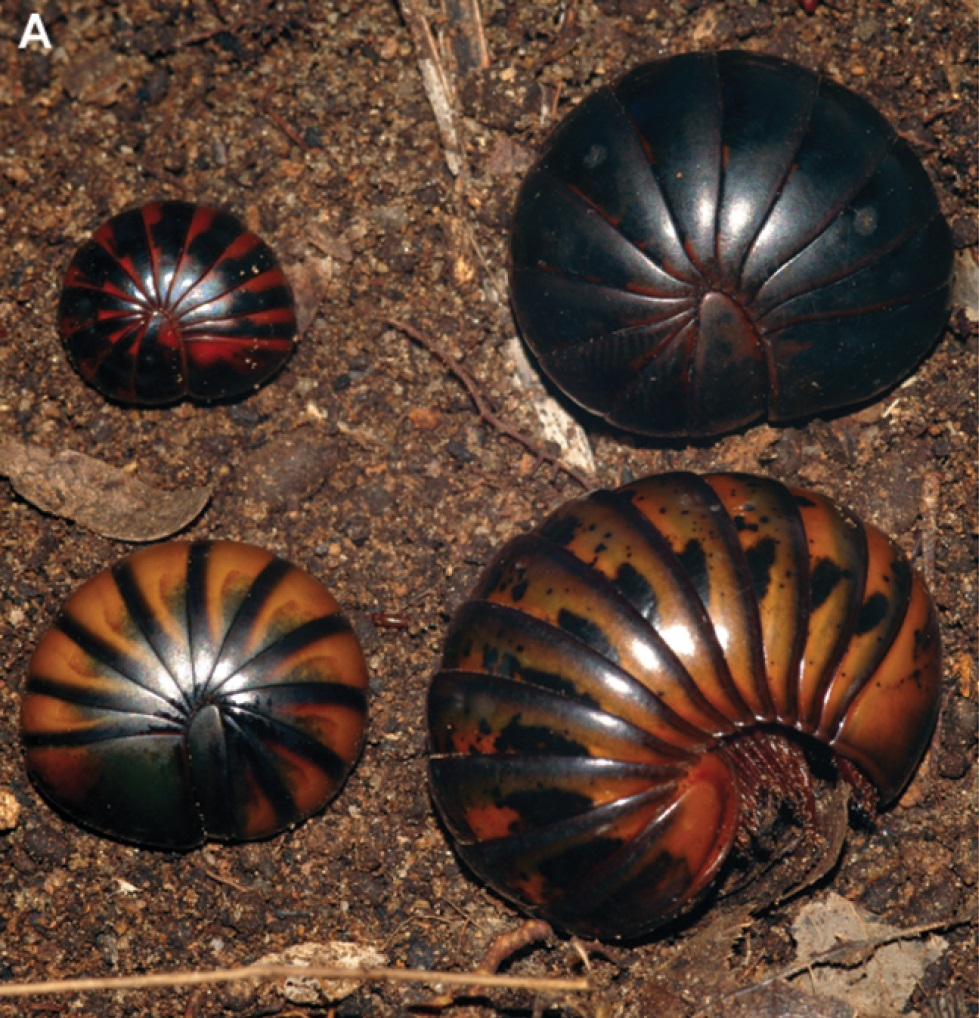
Three color morphs of Sphaeromimus musicus: red (upper left), brown (upper right), and "normal" (lower right), which resembles Zoosphaerium blandum (seen at lower left)

Until 2014 only three species of Sphaeromimus were known. A further seven species were described in 2014, some of which are microendemics.

- S. musicus – endemic to spiny forest
- S. inexpectatus
- S. splendidus – from forest fragment on sandy ground, less than 200 ha in size, Sainte-Luce, Anosy Region

2014

- S. andohahela
- S. andrahomana – rainforest taxon from a spiny forest cave
- S. ivohibe
- S. lavasoa – from an isolated, c.100 ha rainforest remnant at Lavasoa Mountain
- S. saintelucei – from littoral rainforest on laterite soil, less than 50 ha in size, Sainte-Luce, Anosy Region
- S. titanus – from a lowland rainforest fragment called Manombo
- S. vatovavy– from a lowland rainforest fragment close to the former French Fort Carnot, only known from two old Museum specimens collected in the 1920s.
