= Prionosoma =

Prionosoma may refer to:

- Prionosoma (bug), a genus of true bugs in the family Pentatomidae
- Prionosoma, a genus of myriapods in the family Craspedosomatidae, synonym of Bergamosoma
- Prionosoma, a genus of flatworms in the family Echinostomatidae, synonym of?
