= Snakeskin (disambiguation) =

Snakeskin may refer to:

- Snakeskin, a material that is made from the skin of a snake
- Snakeskin (song), a song by Australian band Gyroscope
- Snakeskin (film), a New Zealand film
- Snakeskin (band), a side project of Tilo Wolff from Lacrimosa

== See also ==
- Snakeskin Glacier
- Snakeskin gourami, a species of gourami that is important both as a food fish and as an aquarium fish
- Snakeskin grisette (Amanita ceciliae), a basidiomycete fungus species
- Snake skin hunter slug (Chlamydephorus dimidius), a land slug species endemic to South Africa
- Snakeskin liverwort (Conocephalum conicum), a plant species
- Dr. Snakeskin (aka Darius James, born 1954), an African American author
- The Snake's Skin, a novel by prominent Georgian writer Grigol Robakidze
- Waukon Decorah (c. 1780–1868), a prominent Ho-Chunk warrior and orator during the Winnebago War of 1827 and the Black Hawk War of 1832
- Ichthyosis_vulgaris, a skin disorder causing dry, scaly skin among humans
