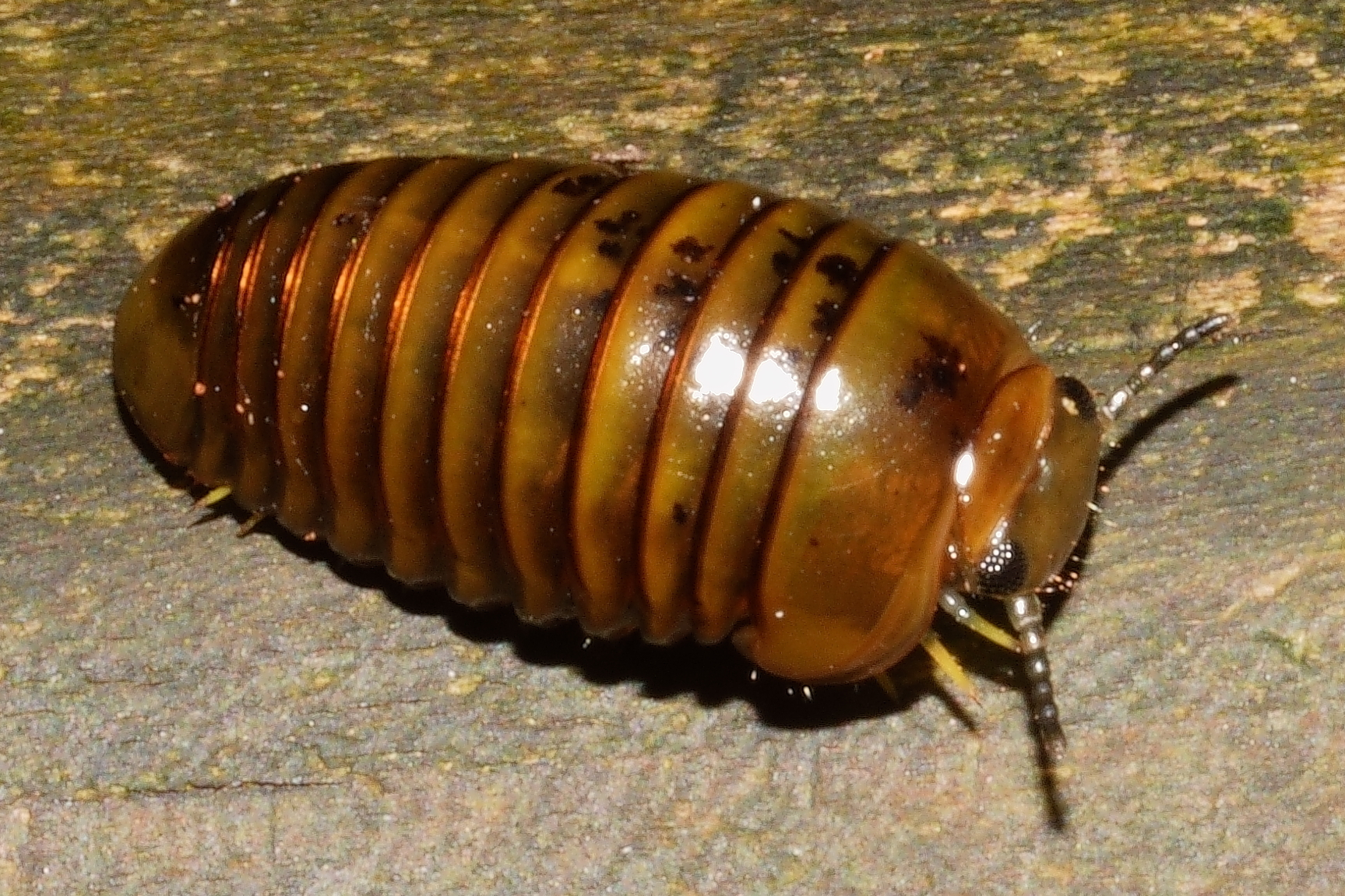

Scientific classification
- Kingdom: Animalia
- Phylum: Arthropoda
- Subphylum: Myriapoda
- Class: Diplopoda
- Order: Sphaerotheriida
- Family: Procyliosomatidae
- Genus: Procyliosoma
- Species: P. tuberculatum

Binomial name
- Procyliosoma tuberculatum Silvestri, 1917

= Procyliosoma tuberculatum =

Species of millipede

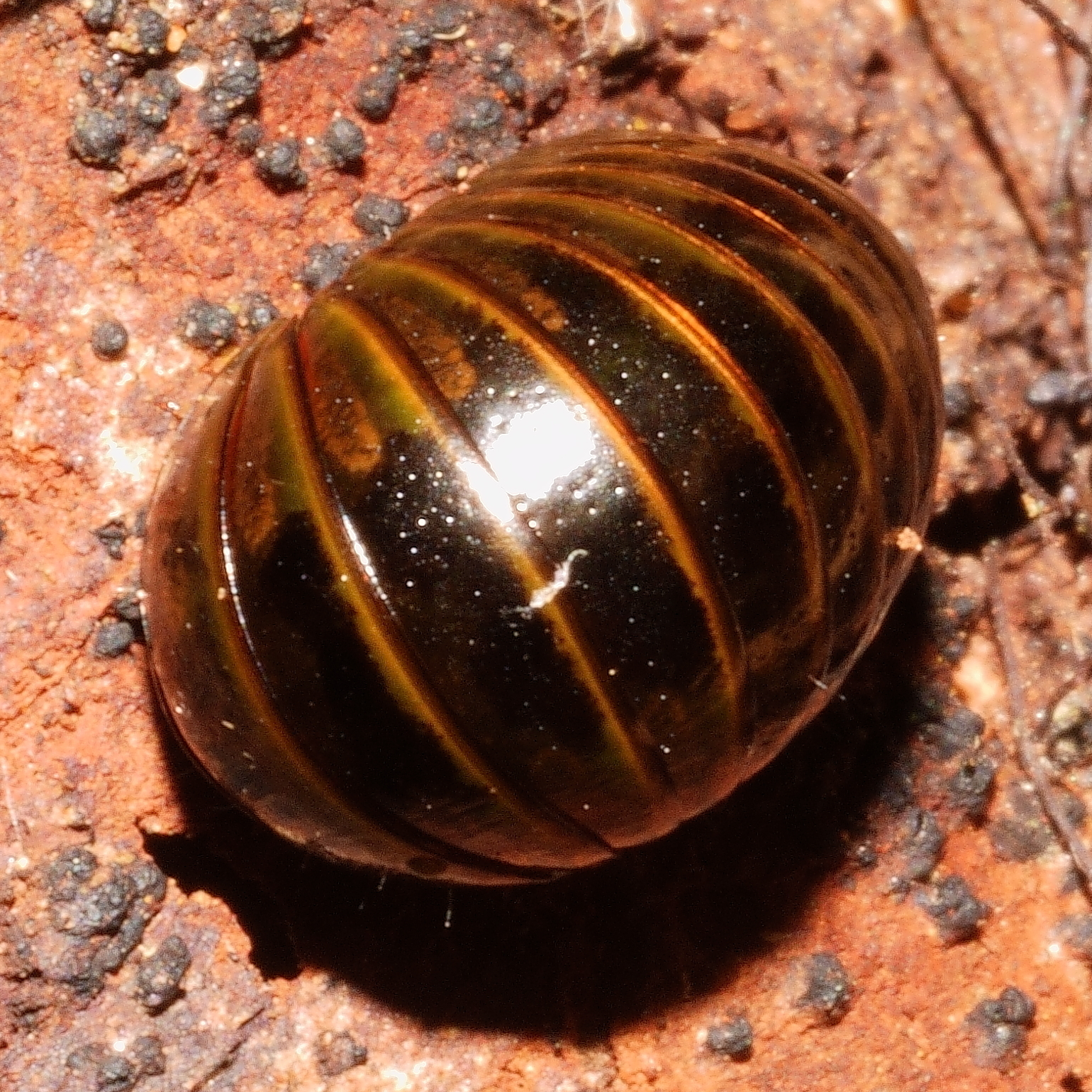
P. tuberculatum in New Zealand

Procyliosoma tuberculatum is a giant pill millipede of the family Procyliosomatidae, endemic to New Zealand. Two subspecies are recognised – P. t. tuberculatum and P. t. westlandicum.

Procyliosoma tuberculatum can grow up to 5 centimetres long and 2.5 centimetres wide. They eat decaying vegetation, and are found throughout the North Island and northern South Island of New Zealand.

Procyliosoma tuberculatum has hard, shiny body plates that allow it roll into a circular shape protecting its head, legs and rear from predators.

The giant pill millipede is very active at night, and by day is found curled up under logs and rocks. Female millipedes can lay up to six eggs under logs and moist soil.
