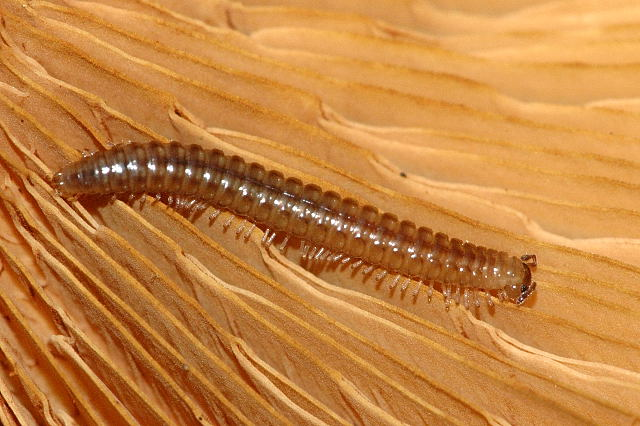

Scientific classification
- Kingdom: Animalia
- Phylum: Arthropoda
- Subphylum: Myriapoda
- Class: Diplopoda
- Order: Chordeumatida
- Family: Craspedosomatidae
- Genus: Craspedosoma
- Species: C. rawlinsii

Binomial name
- Craspedosoma rawlinsii Leach, 1814

= Craspedosoma rawlinsii =

Species of millipede

Craspedosoma rawlinsii is a species of millipede in the family Craspedosomatidae. This millipede is widespread in Europe from the British Isles to Belarus and has also been introduced into Canada. This millipede can reach 16 mm in length and features 30 segments, counting the collum as the first segment and the telson as the last.

== Discovery and taxonomy ==
Authorities disagree regarding the proper spelling of the name of this species, with some using the name C. raulinsii rather than C. rawlinsii. This species was first described in 1814 by the English zoologist William Elford Leach using the spelling C. raulinsii. He named this species explicitly in memory of his late colleague Richard Rawlins, who discovered the first specimen under stones near Edinburgh in Scotland. Leach used the spelling C. rawlinsii in another 1814 description that was not published until 1815. Some authorities deem C. raulinsii to be the correct spelling based on the earlier publication. Nevertheless, the spelling C. rawlinsii has been widely used and is accepted by other references as the correct spelling, citing the later publication.

This species is extremely variable, and authorities have described many subspecies and varieties. References list several accepted subspecies, including C. rawlinsii rawlinsii, the subspecies originally described by Leach. Some authorities have deemed some of these subspecies to be separate species. All records of this species in the British Isles are specimens of the subspecies C. rawlinsii rawlinsii.

== Description ==
The adults of this species range from 15 mm to 16 mm in length and from 1.2 mm to 1.7 mm in width. The body is a rich reddish brown with a dark line down the middle of the back and narrow dorsal bands on either side, but with light amber areas around the paranota. The paranota are smoothly rounded lobes on the sides of the body. The paranota give the body the shape of a rounded trapezoid in cross section. Each tergite features three pairs of setae. The ocelli are well developed and form roughly equilateral triangles.

As in most species in the order Chordeumatida, adults of this species feature 30 segments (counting the collum, the telson, and the segments in between), with 50 pairs of legs in the females and 48 leg pairs in the males, excluding leg pairs 8 and 9, which become gonopods in adult males. The anterior gonopods in this species feature a more distal element (telopodite) on each side with the more basal (coxal) piece in between, and the posterior gonopods feature six processes projecting from a broad base. The sizes and shapes of these processes can vary in this species, and these variations give rise to the many subspecies and varieties described from continental Europe.

== Distribution ==
This millipede is widespread in Europe, where this species has been recorded in Austria, Belarus, Belgium, Bosnia and Herzegovina, Bulgaria, Croatia, the Czech Republic, Denmark, Estonia, Finland, France, Germany, Hungary, Ireland, Italy, Latvia, Lithuania, Luxembourg, the Netherlands, Norway, Poland, Romania, Russia, Serbia, Slovakia, Slovenia, Sweden, Switzerland, and the United Kingdom. This millipede has also been introduced into Canada and is the first species in the family Chordeumatida to be introduced into North America. In Canada, this species has been recorded in Gatineau Park in Quebec and in Cornhill and Grand Bay-Westfield in New Brunswick. In the British Isles, this species is widespread but not common, rare in England, but recorded more frequently in Scotland and Ireland. In Europe, this millipede appears to be spreading to the northeast, where this species has been recorded relatively recently but has become widespread in Estonia and common in Latvia. In Russia, the first record outside of Kaliningrad was from a park in Moscow, where this species was probably introduced.

== Ecology and habitat ==
This millipede is found mainly in woodland (for example, among Alnus), often in sandy soil, and favors high humidity. This species is sometimes found in coniferous forests or more open habitats. In the British Isles, this millipede is usually found in moist litter or under stones or bark, often near water or in an area that can otherwise provide reliable moisture. In Switzerland, this millipede has been recorded at an elevation of 1,540 meters. This species is found year-round, but adults are usually found during the winter.

== Subspecies ==
This species includes the following subspecies:

- Craspedosoma rawlinsii alemannicum Verhoeff, 1910
- Craspedosoma rawlinsii alsaticum Verhoeff, 1910
- Craspedosoma rawlinsii bosniense Verhoeff, 1897
- Craspedosoma rawlinsii germanicum Verhoeff, 1910
- Craspedosoma rawlinsii rawlinsii Leach, 1814
- Craspedosoma rawlinsii repandum Attems
- Craspedosoma rawlinsii transsilvanicum Verhoeff, 1897
