= Cyliosoma =

Scientific classification
- Domain: Eukaryota
- Kingdom: Animalia
- Phylum: Arthropoda
- Subphylum: Myriapoda
- Class: Diplopoda
- Order: Sphaerotheriida
- Family: Cyliosomatidae
- Genus: Cyliosoma; Pocock 1895

Genus of giant pill millipedes

Cyliosoma is a genus of giant millipedes in the family Cyliosomatidae, found in Australia. It was described by Pocock in 1895.
