= C. A. W. Jeekel =

Dutch myriapodologist and entomologist

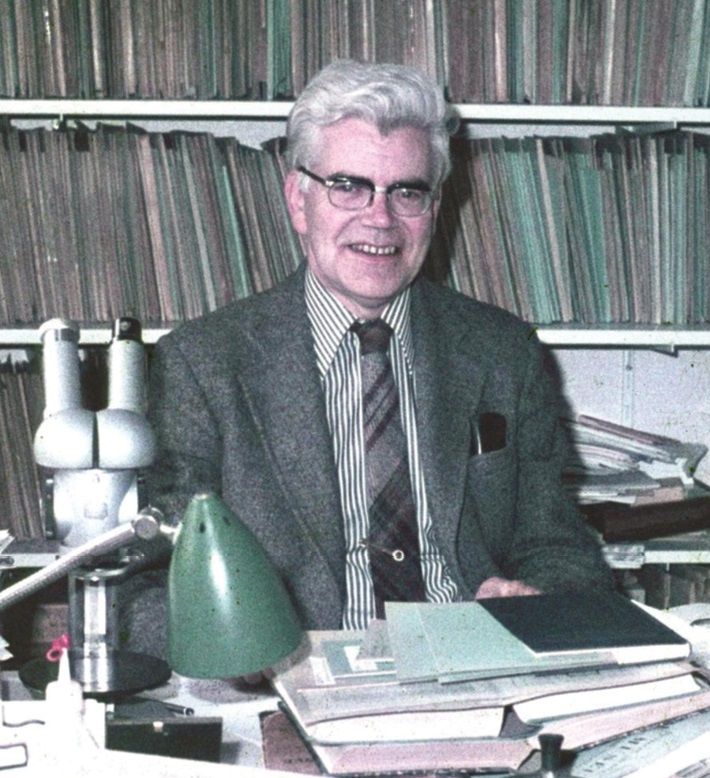
- Jeekel in 1979
- Born: 24 January 1922; Medan, Indonesia
- Died: 13 March 2010 (aged 88)
- Education: University of Amsterdam
- Known for: Advancing taxonomy of millipedes and centipedes
- Scientific career
- Fields: Myriapodology
- Workplaces: Zoological Museum Amsterdam
- Author abbrev. (zoology): Jeekel

Casimir Albrecht Willem Jeekel (24 January 1922 – 13 March 2010) was a Dutch myriapodologist and entomologist known for his major contributions to the taxonomy of millipedes. His 1971 monograph Nomenclator Generum et Familiarum Diplopodorum is credited as launching the "modern era" of millipede taxonomy, and has been considered the "most important single work ever published on the Diplopoda". He served as director of the Zoological Museum Amsterdam, and authored over 150 works on the taxonomy of millipedes and other myriapods.

== Biography ==
Jekel was born in 1922 in Medan, on the Indonesian island of Sumatra, and his family moved back to the Netherlands when he was still young. His publications began in 1950, with a pair of papers on millipedes from Suriname. The following year he published a study of the genus Tectoporus (Paradoxosomatidae) and described a new species of Sphaeropoeus (Zephroniidae); both works were praised by colleague Richard L. Hoffman, the former as setting a standard in generic revision, and both of which influenced Hoffman's own work. During the 1960s Jeekel worked at the Zoological Museum Amsterdam and was librarian for the Netherlands Entomological Society.

He studied at the University of Amsterdam and his doctoral thesis, published in 1968, concerned the classification and geographic distribution of the Paradoxosomatidae, a large family of millipedes. In 1969 he assumed the position of director of the Zoological Museum, a move which "greatly improved his standard of living, but at the expense of his research and health". In 1971, he published the Nomenclator Generum et Familiarum Diplopodorum, a taxonomic listing of all known millipede genera and families described between 1758 and 1957; a hugely influential work credited with starting the "modern era" of millipede taxonomy. Hoffman characterized the Nomenclator as "the most important single work ever published on the Diplopoda".

Throughout his career, Jeekel published more than 150 works, the majority of them as sole author. Jeekel also made major contributions to the taxonomy of Australian millipedes, with 25 articles in his "Millipedes from Australia" series. In 1999 he established the Myriapod Memoranda, a series of publications to which he often contributed review articles. Jeekel also made a modest contribution to mycology, the study of fungi, when in 1959 he described a new species of fungus in the genus Laboulbenia that parasitizes carabid beetles.

== Selected works ==
- Jeekel, C.A.W. (1951): The genus Tectoporus Carl (Diplopoda, Polydesmoidea, Strongylosomidae). Entomologische Berichten 13 (311–312): 266–285.
- Jeekel, C.A.W. (1951): A new pill-milliped from the Malayan Peninsula (Diplopoda, Sphaerotheriidae). Tijdschrift voor Entomologie 93: 101–107.
- Jeekel, C.A.W. (1968): On the classification and geographical distribution of the family Paradoxosomatidae (Diplopoda, Polydesmida). Thesis, University of Amsterdam: 1–162.
- Jeekel, C.A.W. (1971): Nomenclator generum et familiarum Diplopodorum: A list of the genus and family-group names in the Class Diplopoda from the 10th edition of Linnaeus, 1758, to the end of 1957. Monografieen van de Nederlandse Entomologische Vereniging 5: 1–412.
- Jeekel, C.A.W. (2005): Nomenclator generum et familiarum Chilopodorum: A list of the genus and family-group names in the class Chiliopoda from the 10th edition of Linnaeus, 1758, to the end of 1957. – Myriapod Memoranda Supplt 1: 1–130.

== Eponymous taxa ==
The following is a selection of taxa that have been named after Jeekel:

- Cawjeekelia Golovatch 1980 (a genus in the family Paradoxosomatidae)
- Aphistogoniulus jeekeli Decker & Wesener (Spirobolida: Pachybolidae)
- Astromontosoma jeekeli Hoffman, 1978 (Paradoxosomatidae)
- Desmoxytes jeekeli Golovatch & Enghoff, 1994 (Paradoxosomatidae)
- Diopsiulus jeekeli Mauriès, 1981 (Chordeumatida: Metopidiotrichidae)
- Dysmicodesmus jeekeli Mesibov, 2010 (Dalodesmidae)
- Kiulinga jeekeli Hoffman, 1956 (Xystodesmidae)
- Leptherpum jeekeli Hoffman, 1966 (Polydesmida: Chelodesmidae)
- Ophyiulus jeekeli Strasser, 1974 (Julidae)
- Pycnotropis jeekeli Golovatch, Vohland & Hoffman, 1998 (Polydesmida, Aphelidesmidae)
- Streptogonopus jeekeli Golovatch, 2009 (Paradoxosomatidae)
- Schendylops jeekeli Pereira, 2009 (a geophilomorph centipede in the family Schendylidae)
- Tectoporus jeekeli Golovatch & Stoev, 2009 (Paradoxosomatidae)
- Thyropygus casjeekeli Pimvichai, Enghoff & Panha, 2009 (Spirostreptida: Harpagophoridae)
- Tylopus jeekeli Golovatch & Enghoff, 1993 (Paradoxosomatidae)
