= Kylindotherium =

Scientific classification
- Domain: Eukaryota
- Kingdom: Animalia
- Phylum: Arthropoda
- Subphylum: Myriapoda
- Class: Diplopoda
- Order: Sphaerotheriida
- Family: Sphaerotheriidae
- Genus: Kylindotherium; Attems, 1926
- Species: K. leve

Binomial name
- Kylindotherium leve Attems, 1926

Genus of giant millipedes

Kylindotherium is a monotypic genus of giant Pill millipede, native to South Africa. It was first described in 1926 by Attems. It consists of a single species, Kylindotherium leve.
