= Crossosoma (millipede) =

Scientific classification
- Domain: Eukaryota
- Kingdom: Animalia
- Phylum: Arthropoda
- Subphylum: Myriapoda
- Class: Diplopoda
- Order: Chordeumatida
- Family: Craspedosomatidae
- Genus: Crossosoma; Ribaut 1913

Genus of millipedes

Crossosoma is a genus of millipedes in the family Craspedosomatidae. There are about 10 described species in Crossosoma.

== Species ==
- Crossosoma broelemanni Strasser, 1975
- Crossosoma casalei Strasser, 1979
- Crossosoma cavernicola (Manfredi, 1951)
- Crossosoma falciferum Strasser, 1975
- Crossosoma fossum Strasser, 1979
- Crossosoma mauriesi Strasser, 1970
- Crossosoma parvum Strasser, 1979
- Crossosoma peyerimhoffi (Brölemann, 1902)
- Crossosoma phantasma Strasser, 1970
- Crossosoma semipes (Strasser, 1958)
