= Rhymogona =

Scientific classification
- Kingdom: Animalia
- Phylum: Arthropoda
- Subphylum: Myriapoda
- Class: Diplopoda
- Order: Chordeumatida
- Family: Craspedosomatidae
- Genus: Rhymogona; Cook, 1896

Genus of arthropods

Rhymogona is a genus of millipedes belonging to the family Craspedosomatidae.

The species of this genus are found in Central Europe.

Species:

- Rhymogona aelleni (Schubart, 1960)
- Rhymogona hessei (Ravoux, 1935)
