= Chlamydephorus purcelli =

Conservation status
- Endangered (IUCN 2.3)

Scientific classification
- Kingdom: Animalia
- Phylum: Mollusca
- Class: Gastropoda
- Order: Stylommatophora
- Family: Rhytididae
- Genus: Chlamydephorus
- Species: C. purcelli

Binomial name
- Chlamydephorus purcelli (Collinge, 1901)

Species of gastropod

Chlamydephorus purcelli, or Purcell's hunter slug, is an endangered species of air-breathing land slug, a terrestrial pulmonate gastropod mollusk in the family Chlamydephoridae.

== Distribution ==
This species is endemic to Table Mountain in South Africa. The survival of this slug is threatened by habitat loss.
