= Cynotelopus =

Conservation status
- Endangered (IUCN 3.1)

Scientific classification
- Kingdom: Animalia
- Phylum: Arthropoda
- Subphylum: Myriapoda
- Class: Diplopoda
- Order: Sphaerotheriida
- Family: Cyliosomatidae
- Genus: Cynotelopus; Jeekel, 1986
- Species: C. notabilis

Binomial name
- Cynotelopus notabilis Jeekel, 1986

Genus of millipede

Cynotelopus is a monotypic genus of pill millipedes, found in south west Australia. It was first described in 1986 by C. A. W. Jeekel. It consists of a single species: Cynotelopus notabilis.
