= Haaseidae =

Scientific classification
- Domain: Eukaryota
- Kingdom: Animalia
- Phylum: Arthropoda
- Subphylum: Myriapoda
- Class: Diplopoda
- Order: Chordeumatida
- Superfamily: Haaseoidea
- Family: Haaseidae

Family of millipedes

Haaseidae is a family of millipedes belonging to the order Chordeumatida. This family includes 29 species. These millipedes are found in central and southeastern Europe.

== Description ==
Adult millipedes in this family range from 4.5 mm to 12 mm in length. The paranota are well developed, and the dorsal surface features very long bristles. The basal segment in the ninth leg pair of males is enlarged. Species in this family have either 28 or 30 segments (counting the collum as the first segment and the telson as the last).

== Genera ==
This family includes five genera:

- Haasea Verhoeff, 1895
- Hylebainosoma Verhoeff, 1899
- Maurieseuma Antić & Spelda, 2022
- Romanosoma Mauriès, 2015
- Xylophageuma Verhoeff, 1911
