= Chlamydephorus dimidius =

Conservation status
- Vulnerable (IUCN 2.3)

Scientific classification
- Kingdom: Animalia
- Phylum: Mollusca
- Class: Gastropoda
- Order: Stylommatophora
- Family: Rhytididae
- Genus: Chlamydephorus
- Species: C. dimidius

Binomial name
- Chlamydephorus dimidius (Watson, 1915)

Species of gastropod

Chlamydephorus dimidius, the snake skin hunter slug, is a species of land slug in the family Chlamydephoridae. It is endemic to South Africa, where it is known from six localities in KwaZulu-Natal.

This slug lives in fragmented forest habitat, mostly in coastal areas.
