= Bergamosoma =

Scientific classification
- Kingdom: Animalia
- Phylum: Arthropoda
- Subphylum: Myriapoda
- Class: Diplopoda
- Order: Chordeumatida
- Family: Craspedosomatidae
- Genus: Bergamosoma; Hoffman, 1980

Genus of millipedes

Bergamosoma is a genus of millipedes belonging to the family Craspedosomatidae.

The species of this genus are found in Central Europe.

Species:

- Bergamosoma baldense (Verhoeff, 1934)
- Bergamosoma bergomatium (Verhoeff, 1925)
