= Chlamydephorus =

Scientific classification
- Kingdom: Animalia
- Phylum: Mollusca
- Class: Gastropoda
- Order: Stylommatophora
- Family: Rhytididae
- Subfamily: Chlamydephorinae
- Genus: Chlamydephorus; Binney, 1879

Diversity
- 10 species

Synonyms
- Aperidae Möllendorff, 1903; Apera Heynemann, 1885

Genus of gastropods

Chlamydephorus is a genus of air-breathing land slugs, terrestrial pulmonate gastropod mollusks in the subfamily Chlamydephorinae, family Rhytididae.

Chlamydephorus is the type genus of the family Chlamydephoridae.

== Species ==
Species within the genus Chlamydephorus include:

- Chlamydephorus bruggeni (L. Forcart, 1967)
- Chlamydephorus burnupi (Smith, 1892) - Burnup's hunter slug
- Chlamydephorus dimidius (Watson, 1915) - snake skin hunter slug
- Chlamydephorus gibbonsi Binney, 1879
- Chlamydephorus lawrencei (L. Forcart, 1963)
- Chlamydephorus parvus (H. Watson, 1915)
- Chlamydephorus purcelli (Collinge, 1901) - Purcell's hunter slug
- Chlamydephorus septentrionalis (L. Forcart, 1967)
- Chlamydephorus sexangulus (H. Watson, 1915)
- Chlamydephorus watsoni (L. Forcart, 1967)

== Distribution ==
Species of Chlamydephorus occur across southern Africa; they are most commonly found in the Natal region of South Africa.

== Description ==
Chlamydephorus slugs have an internal vestigial shell. The pallial organs are located at the posterior end of the elongated body and embedded under the dorsal integument. The elongation of the buccal mass varies greatly among the different species of the family and this is reflected in the size of the radula and the number of teeth. In all species the jaw is absent. The largest individuals of these slugs can be up to 120 mm in length.

== Ecology ==
These slugs are believed to be mostly subterranean dwellers. Gut analysis of one species found both plant and animal matter, indicating that they are facultative predators who will also eat vegetation. They have been recorded as eating pill millipedes of the genus Sphaerotherium, snails, other arthropods and soft-bodied invertebrates such as earthworms. The prey is subdued by injecting a toxin into its flesh.
