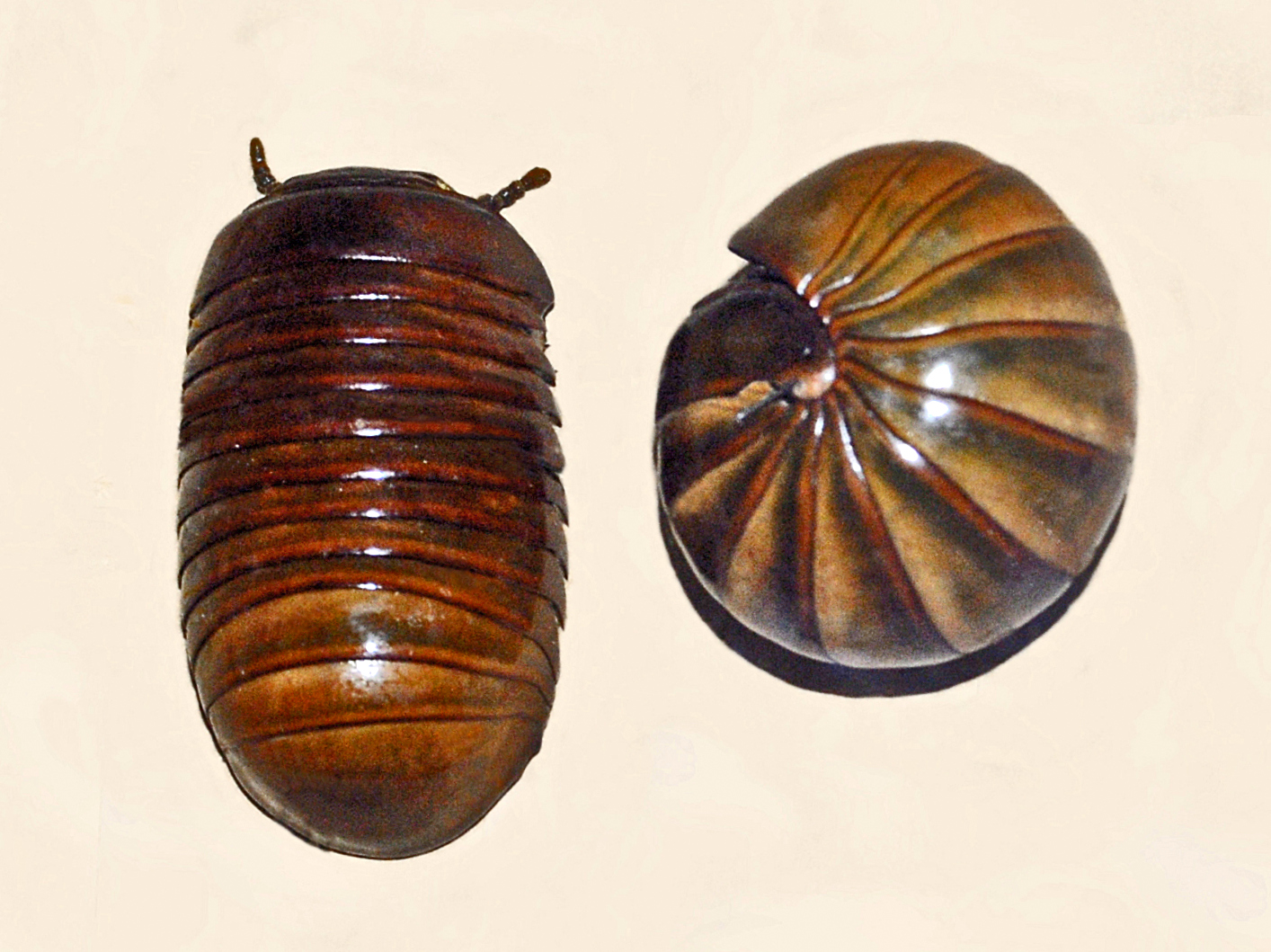
- Sphaeropoeus hercules

Scientific classification
- Domain: Eukaryota
- Kingdom: Animalia
- Phylum: Arthropoda
- Subphylum: Myriapoda
- Class: Diplopoda
- Order: Sphaerotheriida
- Family: Zephroniidae
- Genus: Sphaeropoeus; Brandt, 1833

= Sphaeropoeus =

Genus of millipedes

Sphaeropoeus is a genus of giant pill millipedes belonging to the family Zephroniidae.

== Distribution ==
Species of this genus are present in North India, Myanmar, Malayan Peninsula, Java, Sumatra and Borneo.

== Species ==
- Sphaeropoeus exstinctus
- Sphaeropoeus extinctus
- Sphaeropoeus gisleni
- Sphaeropoeus glabrus
- Sphaeropoeus hercules
- Sphaeropoeus inermis
- Sphaeropoeus lugubris
- Sphaeropoeus maculatus
- Sphaeropoeus magnus
- Sphaeropoeus malaccanus
- Sphaeropoeus modiglianii
- Sphaeropoeus montanus
- Sphaeropoeus musicus
- Sphaeropoeus pellitus
- Sphaeropoeus politus
- Sphaeropoeus punctulatissimus
- Sphaeropoeus speciosus
- Sphaeropoeus stollii
- Sphaeropoeus sumatrensis
- Sphaeropoeus tatusiaeformis
- Sphaeropoeus tigratus
- Sphaeropoeus tuberculosus
- Sphaeropoeus unciger
- Sphaeropoeus variegatus
- Sphaeropoeus velutinus
