= Cawjeekelia =

Scientific classification
- Domain: Eukaryota
- Kingdom: Animalia
- Phylum: Arthropoda
- Subphylum: Myriapoda
- Class: Diplopoda
- Order: Polydesmida
- Family: Paradoxosomatidae
- Genus: Cawjeekelia; Golovatch, 1980

Genus of millipedes

Cawjeekelia is a genus of millipedes belonging to the family Paradoxosomatidae.

The species of this genus are found in Southeastern Asia.

Species:

- Cawjeekelia fimbriata (Attems, 1944)
- Cawjeekelia gloriosa Golovatch, 1980
- Cawjeekelia iksana Mikhaljova & Lim, 2000
- Cawjeekelia kanoi (Takakuwa, 1943)
- Cawjeekelia koreana (Golovatch, 1980)
- Cawjeekelia nordenskioeldi (Attems, 1909)
- Cawjeekelia nova Golovatch, 2011
- Cawjeekelia pallida Golovatch, 1996
- Cawjeekelia propria (Mikhaljova & Korsós, 2003)
- Cawjeekelia pyongana Mikhaljova & Kim, 1993
