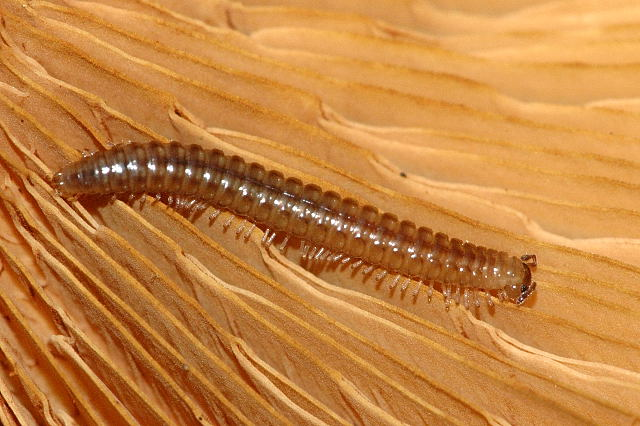
- Craspedosoma.rawlinsi

Scientific classification
- Domain: Eukaryota
- Kingdom: Animalia
- Phylum: Arthropoda
- Subphylum: Myriapoda
- Class: Diplopoda
- Order: Chordeumatida
- Family: Craspedosomatidae
- Genus: Craspedosoma; Leach, 1814

= Craspedosoma =

Genus of arthropods

Craspedosoma is a genus of millipedes belonging to the family Craspedosomatidae.

The species of this genus are found in Europe and Northern America.

Species:

- Craspedosoma aculeatum Menge, 1854
- Craspedosoma aegonotum Attems, 1926
- Craspedosoma blaniulides Latzel, 1900
- Craspedosoma brentanum Verhoeff, 1926
- Craspedosoma ciliatum Koch, 1847
- Craspedosoma intermedium Silvestri, 1894
- Craspedosoma rawlinsii Leach, 1814
