= Microsphaerotherium =

Scientific classification
- Kingdom: Animalia
- Phylum: Arthropoda
- Subphylum: Myriapoda
- Class: Diplopoda
- Order: Sphaerotheriida
- Family: Arthrosphaeridae
- Genus: Microsphaerotherium; Wesener & VandenSpiegel, 2007

Genus of pill millipedes

Microsphaerotherium is a genus of pill millipedes in the family Arthrosphaeridae. Only two species are currently known:

- Microsphaerotherium ivohibiense
- Microsphaerotherium anjozorobe
