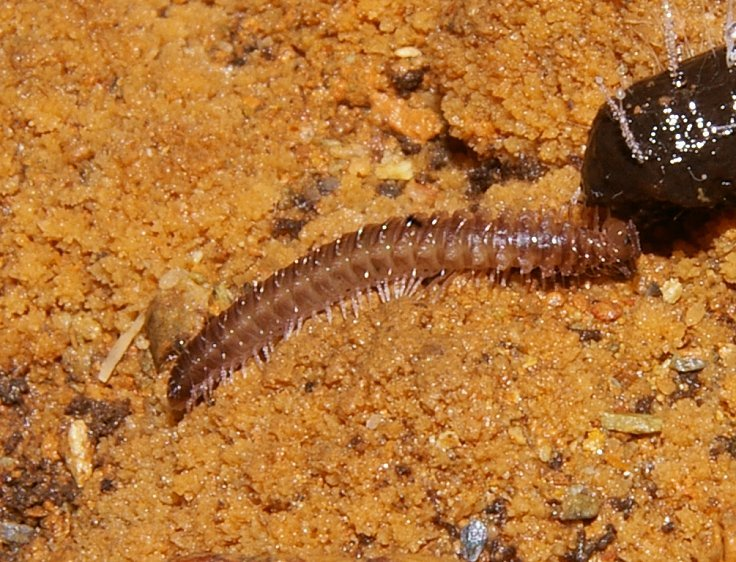
- Nanogona sp.

Scientific classification
- Domain: Eukaryota
- Kingdom: Animalia
- Phylum: Arthropoda
- Subphylum: Myriapoda
- Class: Diplopoda
- Order: Chordeumatida
- Superfamily: Craspedosomatoidea
- Family: Craspedosomatidae; Gray, 1843

= Craspedosomatidae =

Family of millipedes

Craspedosomatidae is a family of millipedes in the order Chordeumatida. Most adult millipedes in this family have 30 segments (counting the collum as the first segment and the telson as the last), but some have only 28. There are at least 30 genera and 210 described species in Craspedosomatidae.

== Genera ==
The following are included in BioLib.cz:

1. Antroverhoeffia Strasser, 1970
2. Aporogona Cook, 1895
3. Asandalum Attems, 1949
4. Asandalum Attems, 1959
5. Aspromontia Strasser, 1970
6. Atractosoma Fanzago, 1876
7. Autaretia Strasser, 1978
8. Basigona Cook, 1895
9. Bergamosoma Hoffman, 1979 (synonym Prionosoma Uhler, 1863)
10. Bomogona Cook, 1895
11. Brentosoma Verhoeff, 1932
12. Broelemanneuma Verhoeff, 1905
13. Brolemanneuma Verhoeff, 1905
14. Calatractosoma Verhoeff, 1900
15. Carniosoma Verhoeff, 1927
16. Chelogona Cook, 1895
17. Corsicosoma Brölemann, 1935
18. Craspedosoma Leach, 1814
19. Crossosoma Ribaut, 1913
20. Dactylophorosoma Verhoeff, 1900
21. Desultorosoma Mrsic, 1985
22. Dorasoma Verhoeff, 1932
23. Dyocerasoma Verhoeff, 1901
24. Helvetiosoma Verhoeff, 1910
25. Iulogona Cook, 1896
26. Janetschekella Schubart, 1954
27. Kelempeckia Strasser, 1974
28. Kelempekia Strasser, 1974
29. Lessinosoma Strasser, 1977
30. Listrocheiritium Verhoeff, 1913
31. Litogona Silvestri, 1897
32. Manfredia Verhoeff, 1940
33. Nanogona Cook, 1895
34. Ochogona Cook, 1895
35. Oroposoma Verhoeff, 1936
36. Oxydactylon Verhoeff, 1897
37. Paradactylophorosoma Attems, 1908
38. Paratractosoma Ceuca, 1971
39. Pedemontia Mauriès, 1994
40. Plectogona Silvestri, 1897
41. Polymicrodon Verhoeff, 1897
42. Pterygophorosoma Verhoeff, 1897
43. Pyrgocyphosoma Verhoeff, 1910
44. Rhodinosoma Attems, 1926
45. Rhymogona Cook, 1896
46. Ribauteuma Verhoeff, 1927
47. Rothenbuehleria Verhoeff, 1900
48. Sardosoma Manfredi, 1956
49. Semiosoma Ribaut, 1913
50. Synischiosoma Verhoeff, 1910
51. Tatrasoma Verhoeff, 1910
52. Valesiosoma Verhoeff, 1931

== External links and further reading ==
- "Craspedosomatidae Family Information". BugGuide.net.
- "Craspedosomatidae Report". Integrated Taxonomic Information System.
- "Craspedosomatidae Overview". Encyclopedia of Life.
- "Browse Craspedosomatidae". Catalogue of Life.
- Shelley, R.M. "The myriapods, the world's leggiest animals".
- Lee, Paul; Harding, P. (2006). Atlas of the millipedes (Diplopoda) of Britain and Ireland. Vol. 59. Pensoft.
- Hoffman, Richard L. (1999). Checklist of the millipeds of North and Middle America. Virginia Museum of Natural History.
- Foddai, Donatella; Dallai, Romano (1995). Chilopoda, Diplopoda, Pauropoda, Symphyla. Calderini.
- Capinera, John L., ed. (2008). Encyclopedia of Entomology. Springer. ISBN 978-1402062421.
