= Tectoporus =

Scientific classification
- Kingdom: Animalia
- Phylum: Arthropoda
- Subphylum: Myriapoda
- Class: Diplopoda
- Order: Polydesmida
- Family: Paradoxosomatidae
- Genus: Tectoporus; Carl, 1902

Genus of millipedes

Tectoporus is a genus of millipedes in the family Paradoxosomatidae, order Polydesmida. The genus was established by Johann Carl in 1902. It is placed in the tribe Tectoporini within the subfamily Paradoxosomatinae.

The genus is primarily associated with the Indomalayan realm and the Australasian region, with species recorded from parts of Southeast Asia, Indonesia, and Papua New Guinea. Early records were concentrated in the Indonesian archipelago, particularly Sumatra, Java, and Sulawesi, while subsequent taxonomic work considerably expanded the known range of the genus eastward into New Guinea.

== Taxonomy ==
Tectoporus was established by Carl in 1902 in his treatment of exotic polydesmid millipedes. The genus was subsequently studied extensively by the Dutch myriapodologist Carel A. W. Jeekel, whose work on Tectoporus and the classification of Paradoxosomatidae contributed to the modern understanding of the group.

The type species is Tectoporus gracilipes Carl, 1902, which was designated as the type species by monotypy. The original species was described from Java, Indonesia.

Tectoporus is currently placed in the tribe Tectoporini. Other genera included in Tectoporini include Caloma, Helicorthomorpha, Leiozonius, and Paternostrana.

Several other generic names have historically been associated with Tectoporus. The genera Celebestia, Pagioprium, and Periballopus have been treated as junior subjective synonyms of Tectoporus in modern catalogues.

== Description ==
Members of Tectoporus are polydesmid millipedes with the general body form characteristic of Paradoxosomatidae. As in other members of the family, the body consists of numerous diplosegments, with the paired body rings giving the animal its characteristic segmented appearance.

Species of Tectoporus vary considerably in external appearance. Some have relatively modest, rounded paraterga, while others possess conspicuous lateral projections. In particular, some New Guinean species have spiniform or spine-like paraterga. This superficial resemblance to the so-called "dragon millipedes" is an example of a similar body modification evolving independently in different paradoxosomatid lineages.

The structure of the male gonopods is particularly important for distinguishing species of Tectoporus. Taxonomic descriptions commonly use the form of the gonopod coxite, femorite, solenophore, and solenomere, together with features of the body surface and paraterga, to distinguish closely related species.

Some species are relatively slender and have long legs. For example, descriptions of New Guinean species report legs that may be approximately one and a half to twice the midbody height. Other species have markedly different body proportions, including the strongly bead-like or "moniliform" body of Tectoporus moniliformis.

== Distribution and habitat ==
Tectoporus has a predominantly tropical distribution. Historically, the genus was known mainly from the Indonesian islands extending from Sumatra through Java to Sulawesi. A worldwide catalogue published in 2013 listed numerous species from Indonesia, including species from Sumatra, Java, and Sulawesi.

The known range was subsequently expanded to Papua New Guinea, where several species have been described from mountainous areas. A 2010 revision described five new species from Papua New Guinea and provided a key to the six species of Tectoporus then known from the island. These species included Tectoporus bispinosus, T. wilhelmicus, T. spiniger, and T. moniliformis, in addition to the previously described T. fugilil.

New Guinean specimens have been collected in montane environments, including rain forests and areas at elevations exceeding 2,000 metres. Tectoporus fugilil, for example, was described from Mount Fugilil in the Western Province at approximately 2,980 metres above sea level.

The distribution of the genus therefore extends considerably farther east than the earliest accounts suggested. Its occurrence in both the Indonesian archipelago and New Guinea makes Tectoporus an important component of the tropical Southeast Asian and Australasian paradoxosomatid fauna.

== Species ==
The number of recognized species has increased substantially since the original three-species list. A worldwide catalogue published in 2013 stated that Tectoporus contained 29 species, while subsequent taxonomic papers described additional species, particularly from Papua New Guinea.

Species and combinations that have been recorded in the genus include:

- Tectoporus aberrans Golovatch, 1997
- Tectoporus ambiguus (Carl, 1941)
- Tectoporus annex (Chamberlin, 1945)
- Tectoporus beroni Golovatch, 1997
- Tectoporus bispinosus Golovatch & Stoev, 2010
- Tectoporus brevipilus (Attems, 1930)
- Tectoporus castaneus (Attems, 1930)
- Tectoporus constrictus (Carl, 1912)
- Tectoporus fugilil Golovatch & Stoev, 2009
- Tectoporus gracilipes Carl, 1902
- Tectoporus hirtellus (Silvestri, 1895)
- Tectoporus hispidus Jeekel, 1951
- Tectoporus moniliformis Golovatch & Stoev, 2010
- Tectoporus pictus (Carl, 1912)
- Tectoporus spiniger Golovatch & Stoev, 2010
- Tectoporus wilhelmicus Golovatch & Stoev, 2010

This list is not necessarily exhaustive, and species-level nomenclature within the genus has changed through successive revisions and catalogues. The 2013 catalogue specifically noted 29 species in the genus.

== Taxonomic history ==
The taxonomy of Tectoporus has undergone several revisions. A major early revision was published by C. A. W. Jeekel in 1951. Later work reassessed the limits of the genus and transferred several species originally described in other genera to Tectoporus. For example, Tectoporus ambiguus was originally described as Orthomorpha (Kalorthomorpha) ambigua, while T. annex was originally described as Oxidus annex.

Jeekel's later work also treated several genera as synonyms of Tectoporus and helped establish the tribe Tectoporini as a useful grouping within Paradoxosomatidae.

Further revisions by Sergei Golovatch and collaborators greatly increased knowledge of the genus, particularly through descriptions of species from Papua New Guinea. The New Guinean species display considerable morphological diversity, including species with unusually developed, spine-like paraterga.

== Morphological diversity ==
The morphology of Tectoporus is notable for the diversity of its paraterga. In some species these lateral structures are small and rounded, whereas in others they can become elongated and spine-like. Tectoporus spiniger, for example, has conspicuous spiniform structures, while T. bispinosus was named for its paired spine-like features.

Another distinctive form is Tectoporus moniliformis, whose body is described as strongly moniliform, giving it a markedly bead-like appearance. Its gonopods are comparatively simple, with a solenophore bearing a small number of laminar lobes.

These differences illustrate the morphological diversity present within the genus and have been important in identifying and describing its species.
