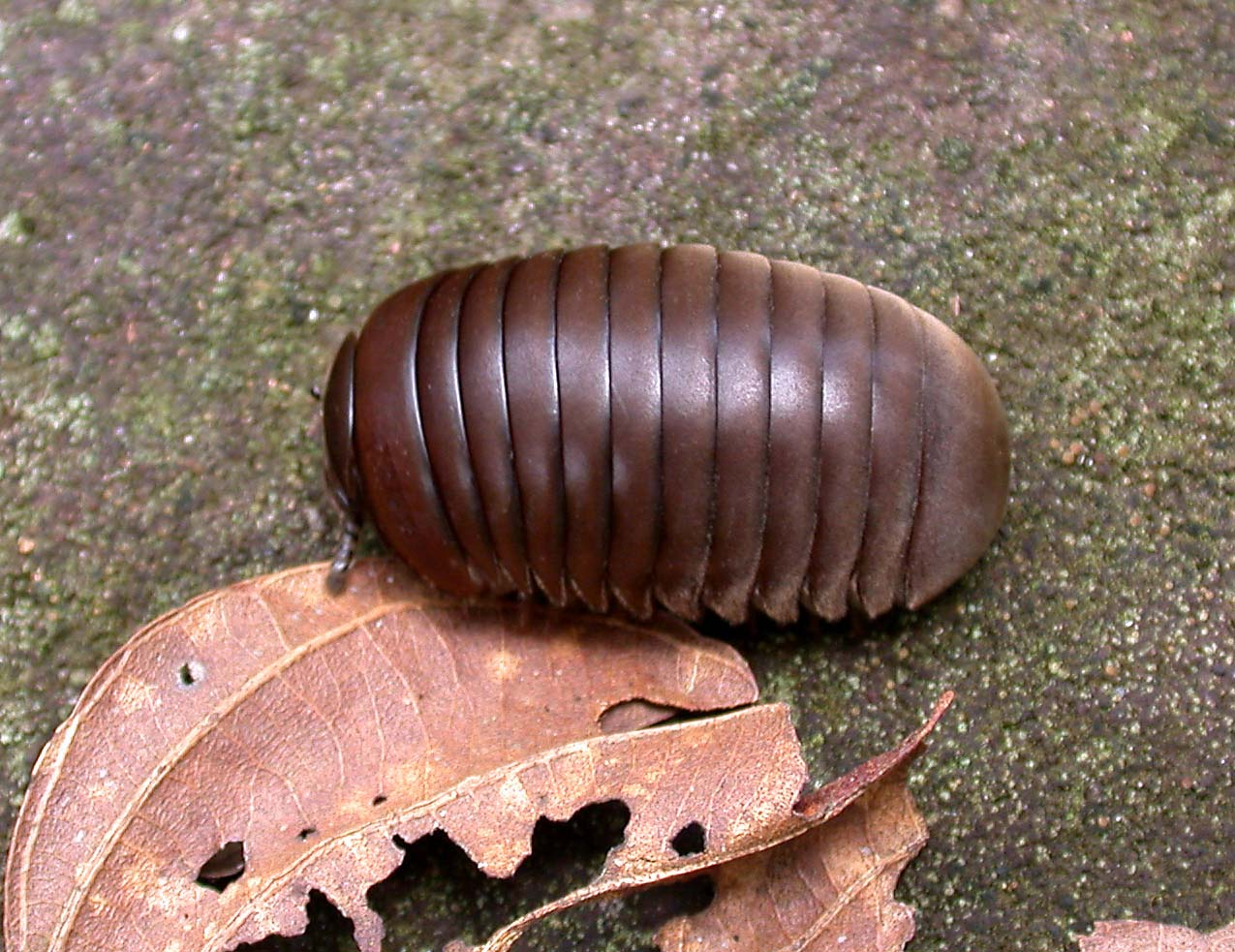
- Zephronia siamemsis

Scientific classification
- Domain: Eukaryota
- Kingdom: Animalia
- Phylum: Arthropoda
- Subphylum: Myriapoda
- Class: Diplopoda
- Order: Sphaerotheriida
- Family: Zephroniidae
- Genus: Zephronia; Gray, 1832

Type species
- Zephronia ovalis Gray, 1832

= Zephronia =

Genus of millipedes

Zephronia is a genus of giant pill millipedes in the family Zephroniidae with more than 50 described species native to Myanmar, India, Vietnam, Thailand, Cambodia, and Laos.

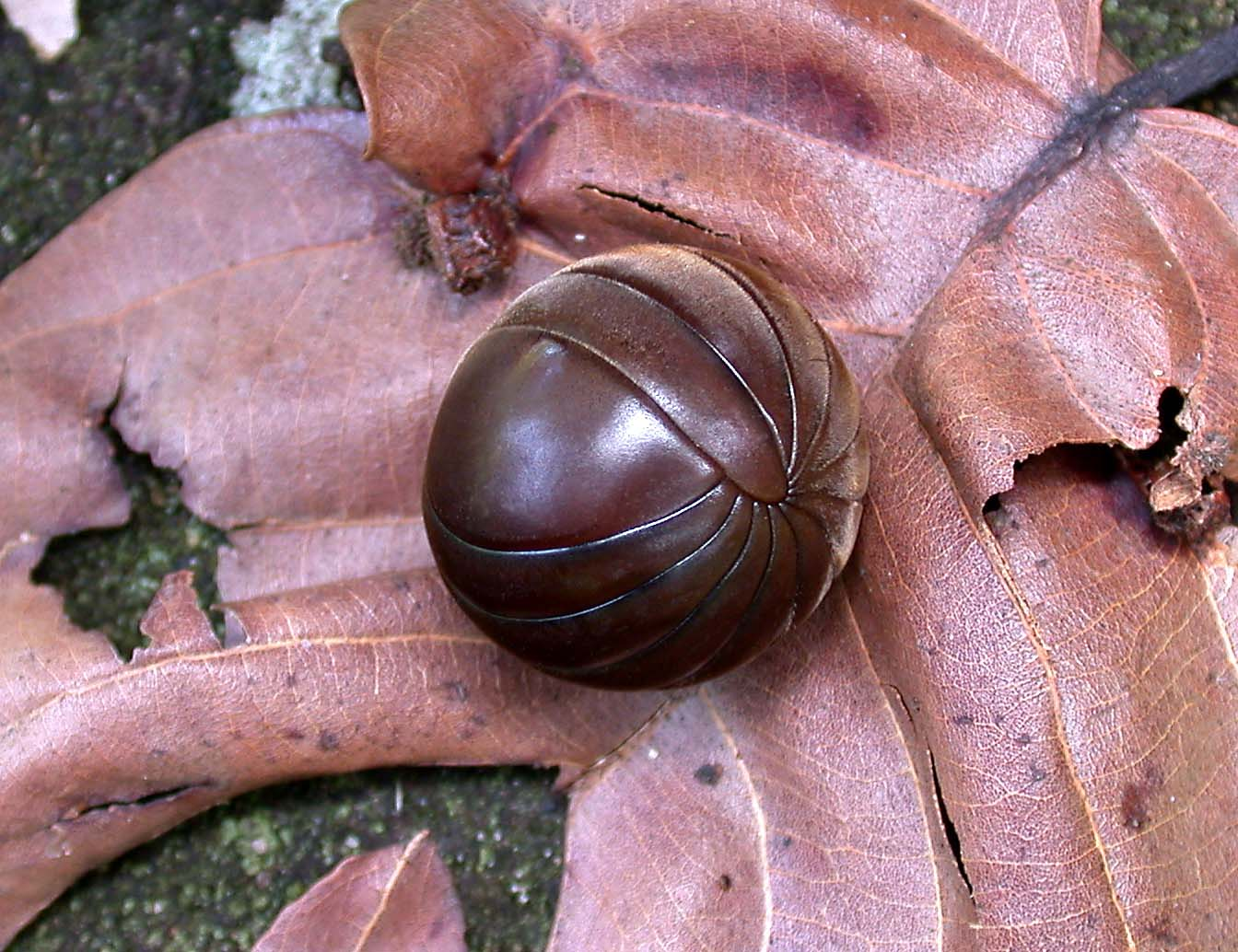
Zephronia siamemsis

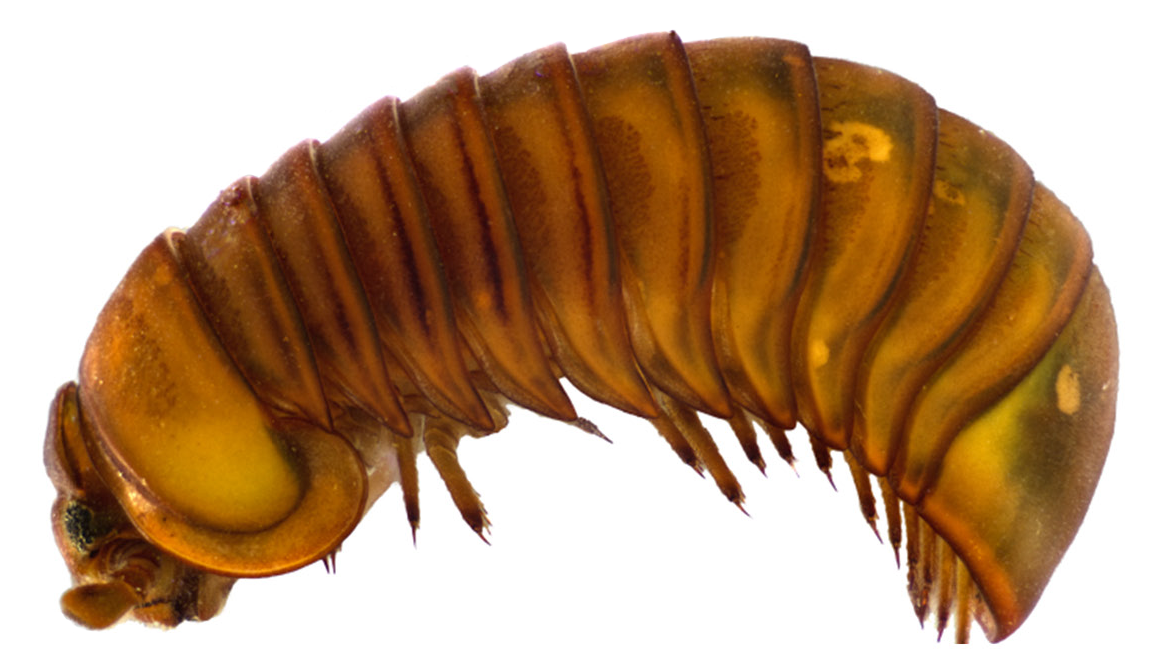
Zephronia viridisoma

== Taxonomy ==
It was published by George Robert Gray in 1832. The type species is Zephronia ovalis Gray, 1832.

=== Species ===
Species within this genus include:

- Zephronia alticola Attems, 1936
- Zephronia anthracina Pocock, 1895
- Zephronia butleri Olliff, 1882
- Zephronia clivicola Pocock, 1890
- Zephronia comotti Pocock, 1890
- Zephronia dawydoffi Attems, 1953
- Zephronia debilis Attems, 1936
- Zephronia densipora Attems, 1936
- Zephronia disparipora Attems, 1936
- Zephronia dollfusi Pocock, 1895
- Zephronia doriae Pocock, 1890
- Zephronia enghoffi Srisonchai, Sutcharit & Likhitrakarn, 2021
- Zephronia feae Pocock, 1890
- Zephronia floweri Hirst, 1907
- Zephronia formosa Pocock, 1890
- Zephronia gestri Pocock, 1890
- Zephronia glaberrima Attems, 1898
- Zephronia golovatchi Srisonchai, Sutcharit & Likhitrakarn, 2021
- Zephronia hirsti Jeekel, 2001
- Zephronia hirta Attems, 1936
- Zephronia hysophila Attems, 1936
- Zephronia impunctata Pocock, 1895
- Zephronia inferior Attems, 1936
- Zephronia juvenis Attems, 1936
- Zephronia konkakinhensis Semenyuk, Golovatch & Wesener, 2018
- Zephronia lannaensis Likhitrakarn & Golovatch, 2021
- Zephronia laotica Wesener, 2019
- Zephronia lignivora Attems, 1936
- Zephronia maculata (Butler, 1874)
- Zephronia montana Karsch, 1881
- Zephronia montis Semenyuk, Golovatch & Wesener, 2018
- Zephronia nepalensis Wesener, 2015
- Zephronia nigrinota Butler, 1872
- Zephronia ovalis Gray, 1832
- Zephronia panhai Srisonchai, Sutcharit & Likhitrakarn, 2021
- Zephronia pellita Attems, 1935
- Zephronia phrain Likhitrakarn & Golovatch, 2021
- Zephronia profuga Attems, 1936
- Zephronia ridleyi Hirst, 1907
- Zephronia semilaevis Pocock, 1890
- Zephronia siamensis Hirst, 1907
- Zephronia specularis Attems, 1936
- Zephronia tigrina Butler, 1872
- Zephronia tigrinoides Attems, 1936
- Zephronia tumida Butler, 1882
- Zephronia viridescens Attems, 1936
- Zephronia viridisoma Rosenmejer & Wesener, 2021
