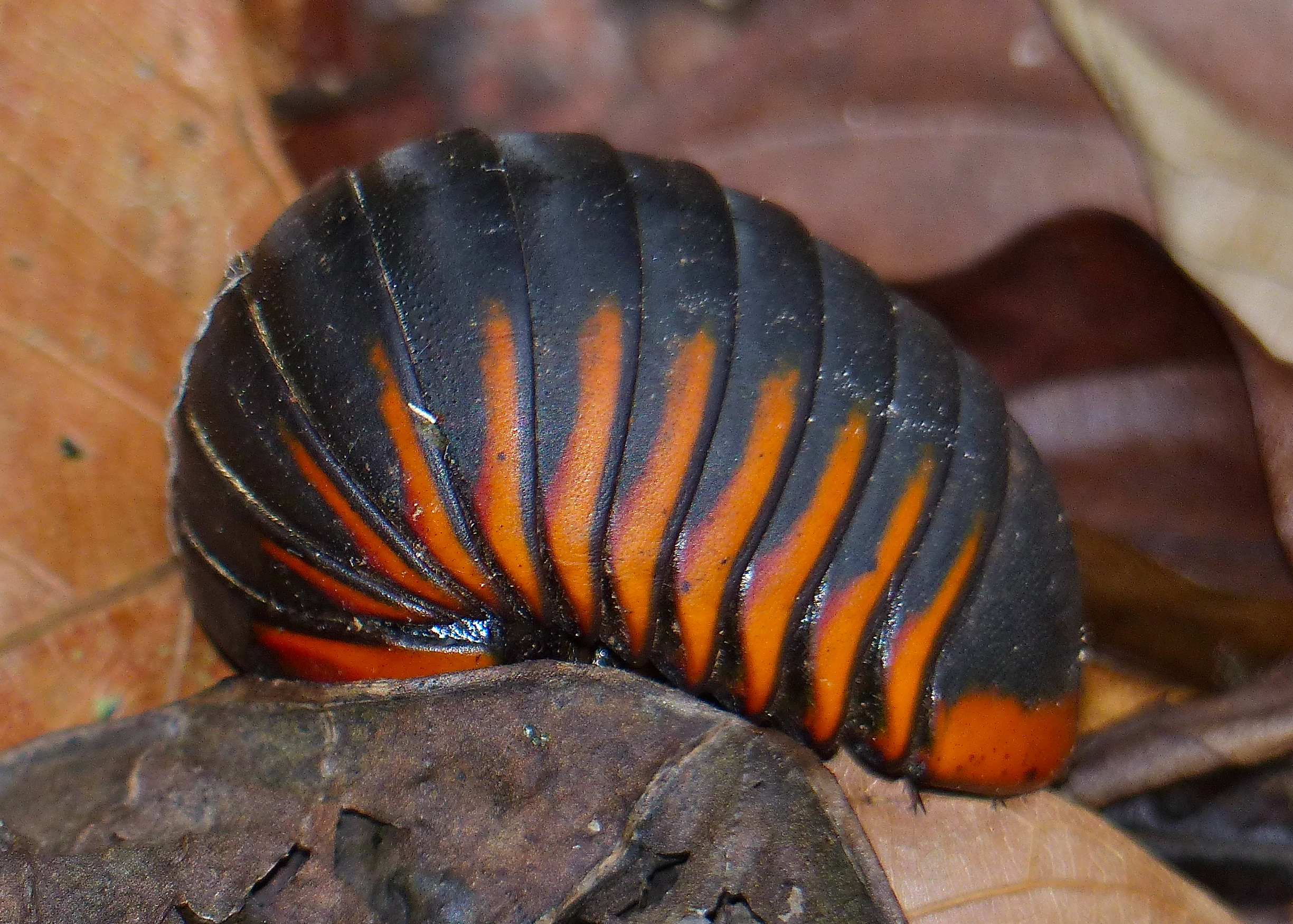
- A zephroniid from Borneo

Scientific classification
- Kingdom: Animalia
- Phylum: Arthropoda
- Subphylum: Myriapoda
- Class: Diplopoda
- Order: Sphaerotheriida
- Family: Zephroniidae; Gray in Jones, 1843

Synonyms
- Sphaeropoeidae

= Zephroniidae =

Family of millipedes

Zephroniidae (sometimes misspelled "Zephronidae") is a family of giant pill millipedes in the taxonomic order Sphaerotheriida. They occur in southeast Asia from the Himalayas and China south and east to Sulawesi and to Australia, and also inhabit some Philippine islands.

Genera in the family Zephroniidae:

Bothrobelum Verhoeff, 1924 – monotypic, Borneo
Castanotherium Pocock, 1895 – 50 species, Indonesian Islands, Philippines
Castanotheroides Chamberlin, 1921 – 3 species, Philippines
Cryxus Leach, 1814 – monotypic, Asia
Cynotelopus Jeekel, 1986
Indosphaera Attems, 1935 – 2 species N. India, Myanmar
Kophosphaera Attems, 1935 – 5 species, N. India, Nepal
Leptoprotopus
Leptotelopus Silvestri, 1897 – monotypic, Myanmar
Prionobelum Verhoeff, 1924 – 8 species, Vietnam, SW China
Pulusphaera
Rajasphaera Attems, 1935 – monotypic, Borneo
Sphaerobelum Verhoeff, 1924 – 4 species, Vietnam
Sphaeropoeus Brandt, 1833 – 22 species, N. India, Myanmar, Malayan Peninsula, Java, Sumatra, Borneo
Tigridosphaera Jeekel, 2000 – 4 species, Malayan Peninsula
Zephronia Gray, 1832 – 37 species N. India, Myanmar, Malayan Peninsula, Java, Sumatra, Borneo

== Gallery ==
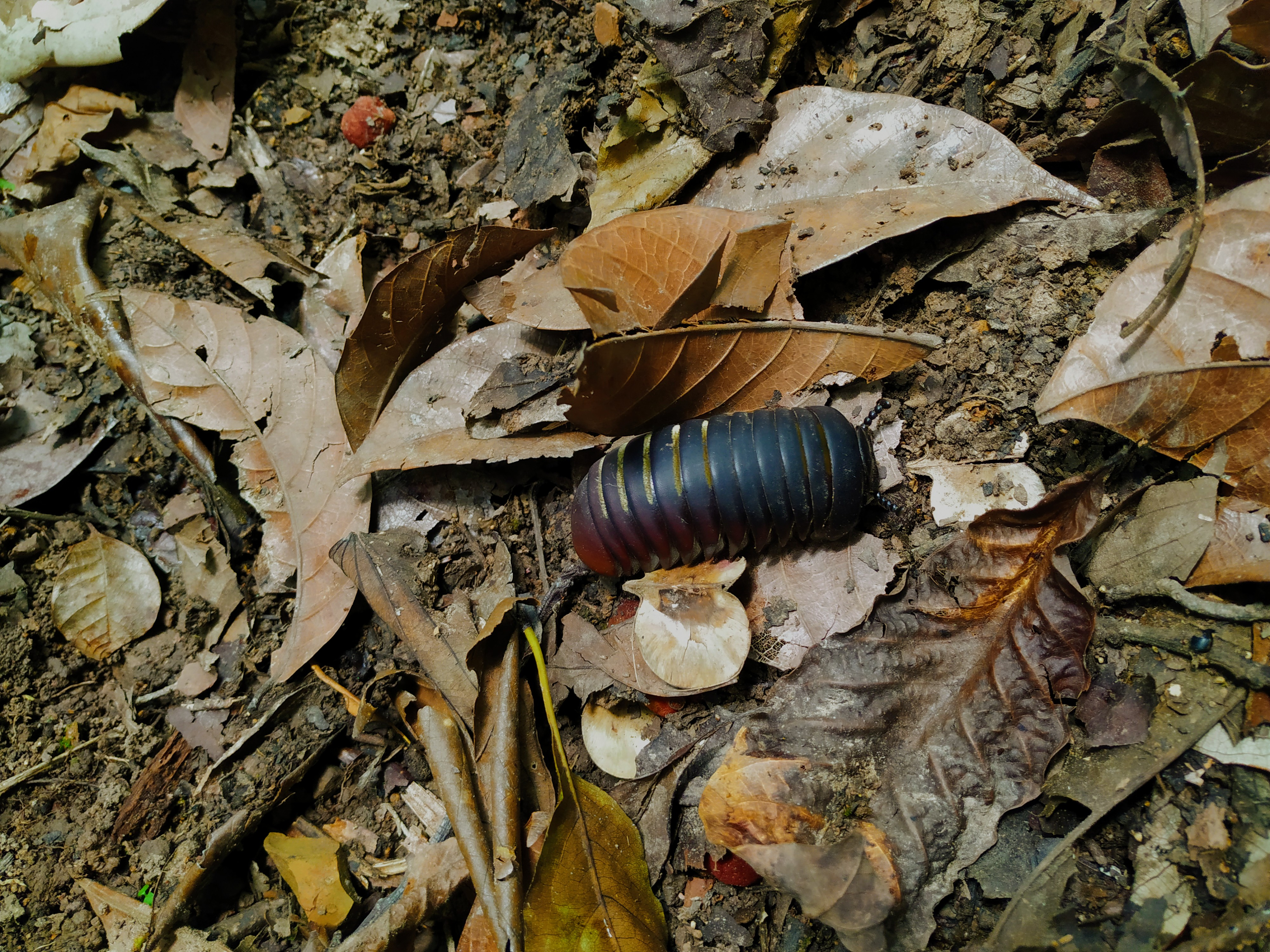
Pill millipede spotted in Borneo
