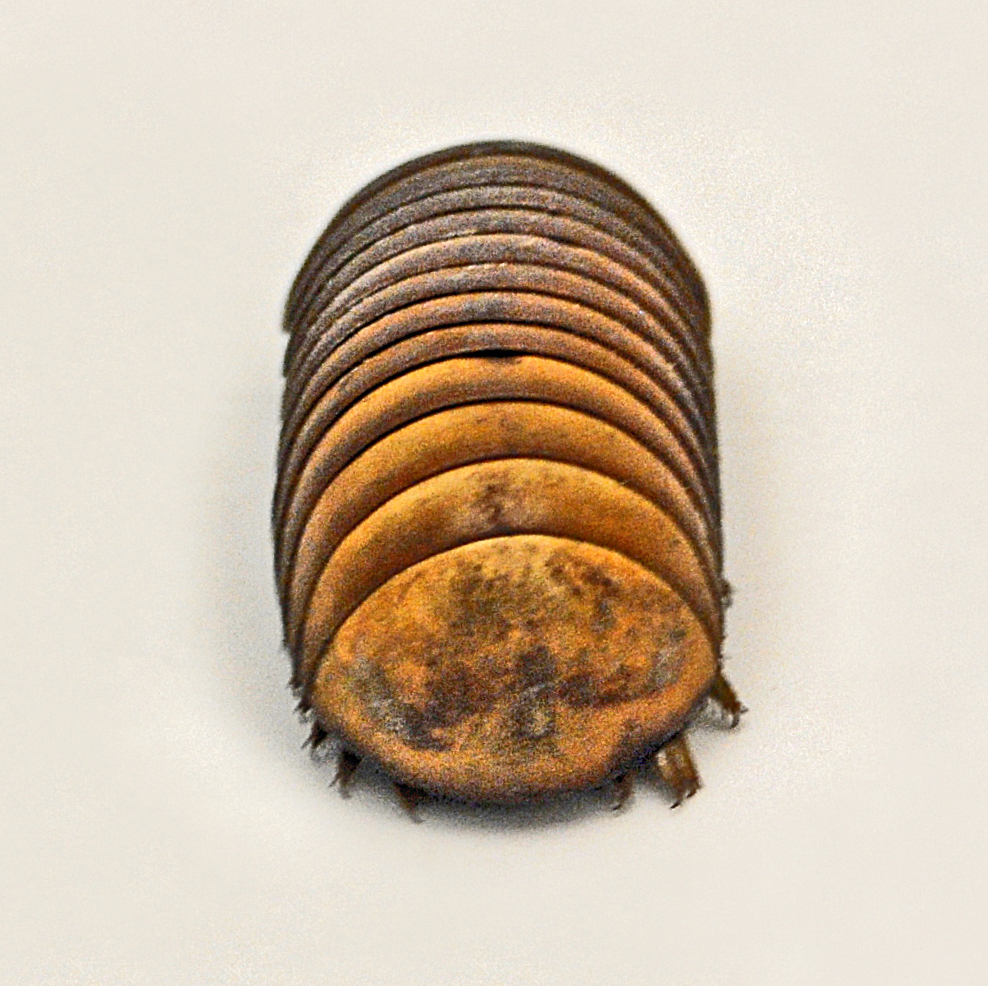
- Sphaerotherium species

Scientific classification
- Kingdom: Animalia
- Phylum: Arthropoda
- Subphylum: Myriapoda
- Class: Diplopoda
- Order: Sphaerotheriida
- Family: Sphaerotheriidae; Brandt, 1833

= Sphaerotheriidae =

Family of millipedes

Sphaerotheriidae is a family of giant pill millipedes of the class Diplopoda. Millipedes of this family are distributed in southern Africa.

== Genera ==
Sphaerotherium Brandt, 1833, 54 species, South Africa, Zimbabwe
Kylindotherium Attems, 1926, monotypic, South Africa
