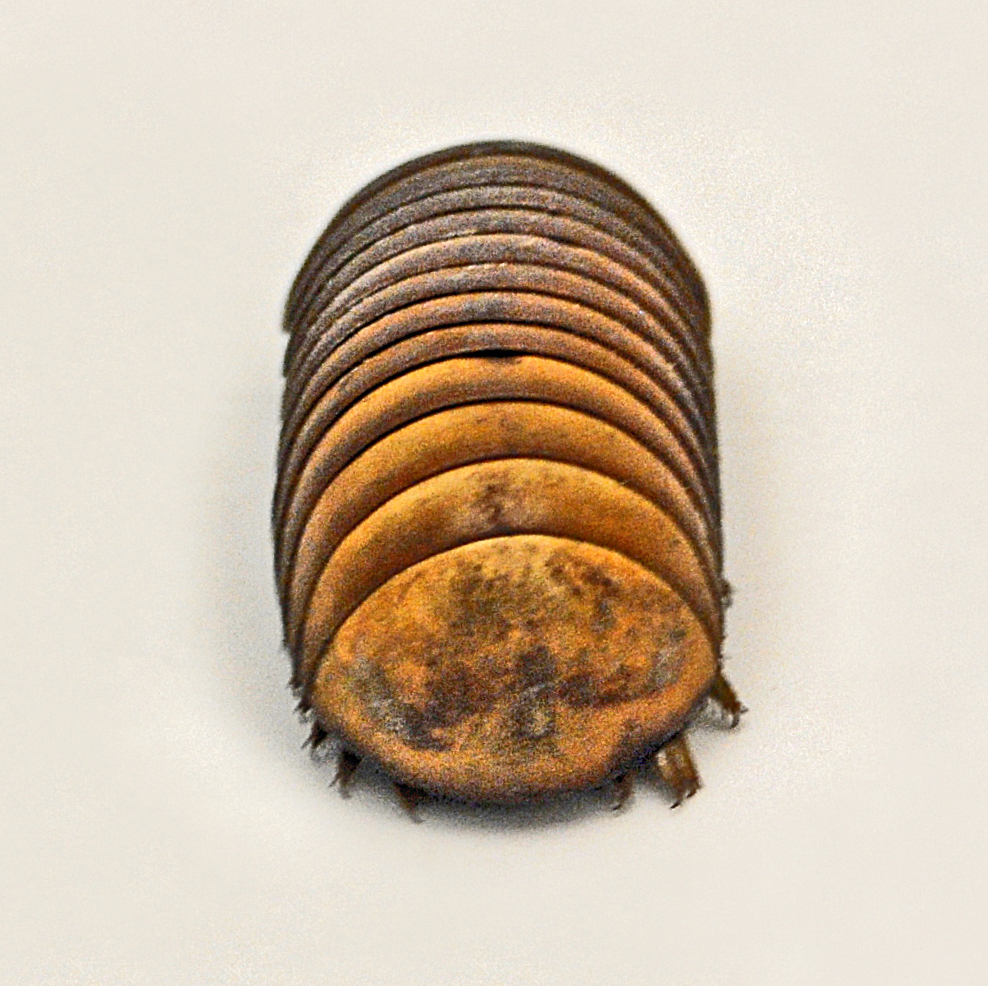
- Sphaerotherium species from Democratic Republic of the Congo

Scientific classification
- Domain: Eukaryota
- Kingdom: Animalia
- Phylum: Arthropoda
- Subphylum: Myriapoda
- Class: Diplopoda
- Order: Sphaerotheriida
- Family: Sphaerotheriidae
- Genus: Sphaerotherium; Brandt, 1833

= Sphaerotherium =

Genus of millipedes

Sphaerotherium is a genus of millipedes belonging to the family Sphaerotheriidae.

== Species ==
- Sphaerotherium angulatum
- Sphaerotherium compessum
- Sphaerotherium compressa
- Sphaerotherium compressum
- Sphaerotherium convexum
- Sphaerotherium crassum
- Sphaerotherium delacyi
- Sphaerotherium digitale
- Sphaerotherium dorsale
- Sphaerotherium elegans
- Sphaerotherium elongatum
- Sphaerotherium forcipatum
- Sphaerotherium fraternum
- Sphaerotherium giganteum
- Sphaerotherium glabrum
- Sphaerotherium gronovii
- Sphaerotherium grossum
- Sphaerotherium hippocastanum
- Sphaerotherium immane
- Sphaerotherium insulanum
- Sphaerotherium intermedium
- Sphaerotherium klugii
- Sphaerotherium kochii
- Sphaerotherium kutorgae
- Sphaerotherium lamprimum
- Sphaerotherium latum
- Sphaerotherium leiosomum
- Sphaerotherium libidinosum
- Sphaerotherium lichtensteinii
- Sphaerotherium marginepunctatum
- Sphaerotherium microstictum
- Sphaerotherium nebulosum
- Sphaerotherium neptunus
- Sphaerotherium nigrum
- Sphaerotherium obtusum
- Sphaerotherium ovale
- Sphaerotherium pubescens
- Sphaerotherium punctulatum
- Sphaerotherium repulsum
- Sphaerotherium reticulatum
- Sphaerotherium retusum
- Sphaerotherium rotundatum
- Sphaerotherium rugulosum
- Sphaerotherium sakananum
- Sphaerotherium stigmaticum
- Sphaerotherium titanus
- Sphaerotherium walesianum
- Sphaerotherium weberii
- Sphaerotherium viride
- Sphaerotherium voeltzkowianum
