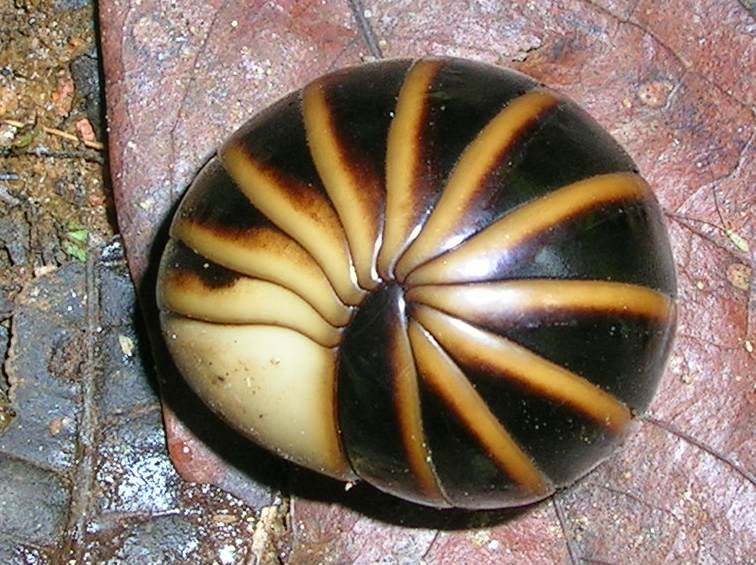

Scientific classification
- Kingdom: Animalia
- Phylum: Arthropoda
- Subphylum: Myriapoda
- Class: Diplopoda
- Subclass: Chilognatha
- Infraclass: Pentazonia
- Superorder: Oniscomorpha
- Order: Sphaerotheriida; Brandt, 1833

Families
- Arthrosphaeridae; Cyliosomatidae; Procyliosomatidae; Sphaerotheriidae; Zephroniidae
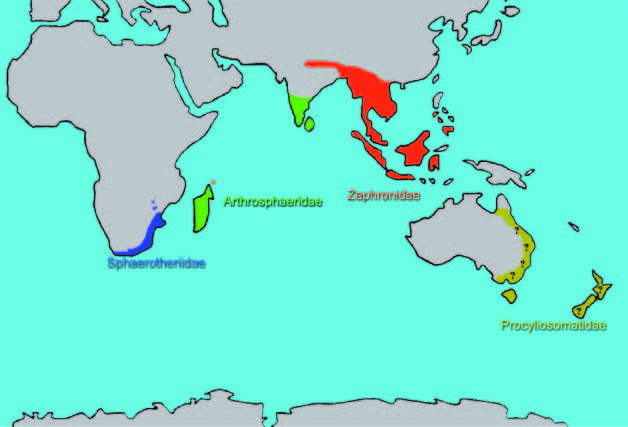

Synonyms
- Chorizocerata Verhoeff

= Sphaerotheriida =

Order of millipedes

Sphaerotheriida is an order of millipedes in the infraclass Pentazonia, sometimes known as giant pill millipedes. They inhabit Southern Africa, Madagascar, South and Southeast Asia, Australia and New Zealand. Like the Northern Hemisphere pill millipedes of the order Glomerida, these millipedes can roll into a ball when disturbed. When they are rolled-up, most sphaerotheriidans reach a maximum size of a cherry or golf ball, but some species from Madagascar can even reach the size of an orange (an example of island gigantism; illustration - ). When rolled-up, predators are unable to unravel giant pill millipedes since the margins of their second and last dorsal plates fit perfectly into one another, creating a sealed ball. A few giant pill millipede species are able to produce sound, the only millipedes known to do this. This order of millipedes is also unique in that some African species are used for medicinal purposes.

== Morphology ==
Sphaerotheriidans are characterized by a relatively conservative body morphology; superficially all species and genera look the same. Dorsally, the head of an adult is followed by twelve body tergites (collum, thoracic shield, and ten normal tergites) and the anal shield. Ventrally, adult females possess twenty-one leg pairs (forty-two legs in total), while adult males carry two additional modified leg pairs, the anterior and posterior telopods under their anal shield. The telopods resemble chelae and/or clamp-like structures, which are probably used in holding the female during mating. In the position of the male telopods, the females instead have a sclerotized subanal plate, which in some species such as those belonging to the family Arthrosphaeridae, is enlarged and is used to produce vibrations (stridulation). Furthermore, unlike other large-bodied millipede orders, Sphaerotheriida do not have glands that excrete poisonous or ill-smelling substances. Instead they depend entirely on their rolling-up behavior for protection.

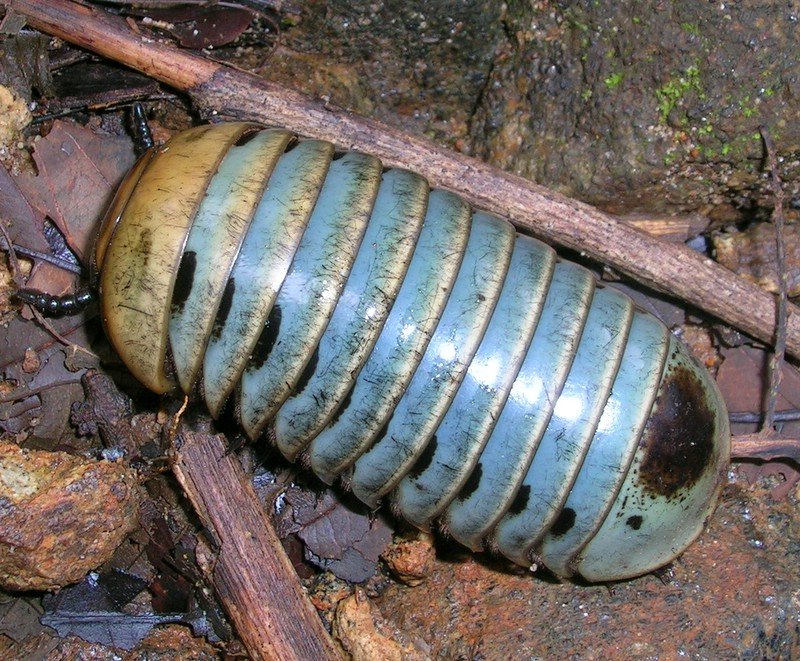
A pill millipede—Arthrosphaera fumosa—from the Western Ghats, India

Sphaerotheriida somewhat resemble the North American and Eurasian pill millipedes of the order Glomerida, but are generally larger in size (20–80 millimetres or 0.8–3.1 inches body length). Until the end of the 20th century only the largest known species in the order Glomerida rivalled the size of even the smallest known Sphaerotheriida, but in the early 21st century a much smaller Sphaerotheriid was described from Madagascar: full-grown specimens of Microsphaerotherium ivohibiensis are just the size of a pea. Also on Madagascar, some giant pill millipede species exhibit island gigantism, reaching more than 9.5 cm (3.7 in) in outstretched length and a size comparable to an orange when rolled up.

The orders differ in the number of tergites in adults (10 or 11 in Glomerida, 12 in Sphaerotheriida) and legs (17 or 19 in Glomerida, 21 or 23 in Sphaerotheriida), and show great differences in their head morphology and genital openings, among other traits. Millipedes in both orders develop by hemianamorphosis.

Both orders have the ability to roll into a perfect ball, protecting the head, antennae, and the vulnerable underside. However, this rolled-up position (volvation) is achieved differently. In Glomerida, the enlarged second body ring (thoracic shield) has a more or less visible gap within which fit the tips of tergites 3–11, whereas in Sphaerotheriida the tips of tergites 3–12 fit perfectly into a groove on the thoracic shield. Juvenile sphaerotheriidans show the same gap as the Glomerida. Many giant pill millipede species have special ledges ('locking carinae') on the underside of the tergite tips and the anal shield which can be moved above a brim on the thoracic shield. These millipedes remain passively locked-up since they do not need continuous muscle contractions to remain in the rolled-up position.

== Distribution ==
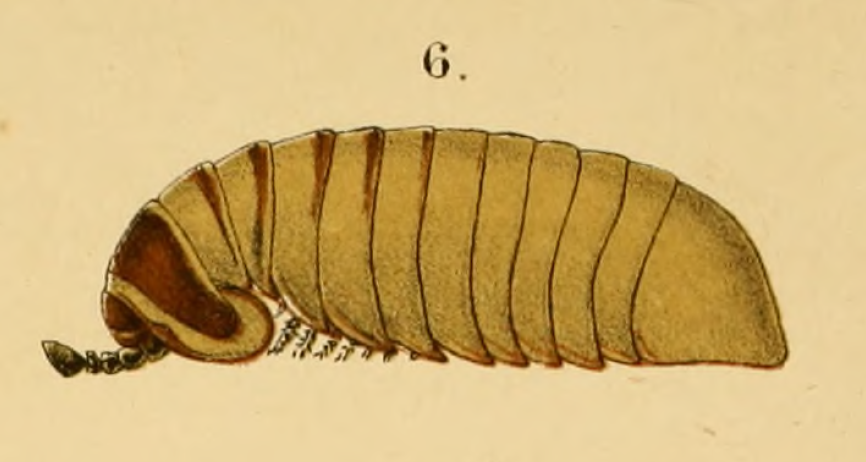
Arthrosphaera bicolor (Arthrosphaeridae), named and painted by Reginald Innes Pocock

In general, Sphaerotheriida have a Gondwanan distribution (the exception is Zephroniidae from southeast Asia and adjacent regions). Gondwana was the large southern continent that formed after the breakup of the supercontinent Pangaea. It included the modern-day landmasses of South America (which however lacks sphaerotheriidans), New Zealand, Australia, India, and Madagascar. It is believed that the Sphaerotheriida originated in Gondwana and then diverged into its various forms.

Sphaerotheriida is divided into four families whose distributions do not overlap: Procyliosomatidae, Zephroniidae, Sphaerotheriidae and Arthrosphaeridae. The most basal family, Procyliosomatidae, lives in Australia and New Zealand. The Zephroniidae (synonym Sphaeropoeidae) occurs in southeast Asia from the Himalayas and China south and east to Sulawesi and inhabits some Philippines islands. The family Sphaerotheriidae only occurs in South Africa with isolated populations in Zimbabwe and Malawi (probably introduced). The Arthrosphaeridae are distributed in southern India and Madagascar.

A few giant pill millipede species have been dispersed by humans, probably inadvertently. Examples include the Sri Lankan Arthrosphaeridae species Arthrosphaera brandtii which has established a population in the Usambara Mountains, Tanzania, as well as some South African Sphaerotherium species which have isolated populations in Malawi. Another likely candidate is Sechelliosoma forcipatum, a small species of the southeast Asian family Zephroniidae, currently only known from a single island in the Seychelles.

== Ecology ==
Little is known about the ecology, development and life history of Sphaerotheriida, but apparently all species are detritivores, feeding on dead organic matter such as leaves and wood on the forest floor. Like earthworms, they play an important role in decomposition; by breaking down decaying organic matter they release locked up nutrients back into the soil. Such recycling is essential for plant nutrition and accordingly for the entire ecology. It is possible that giant pill millipedes rely on special bacteria in their gut, much as termites do, to exploit the nutritional value of otherwise indigestible material such as lignin.

Like most millipedes, Sphaerotheriida inhabit mainly the leaf litter of humid forests. Some species, however, show an arboreal (tree-living) lifestyle, and in these the rolling-up reflex has been suppressed.

== Defense against predation ==
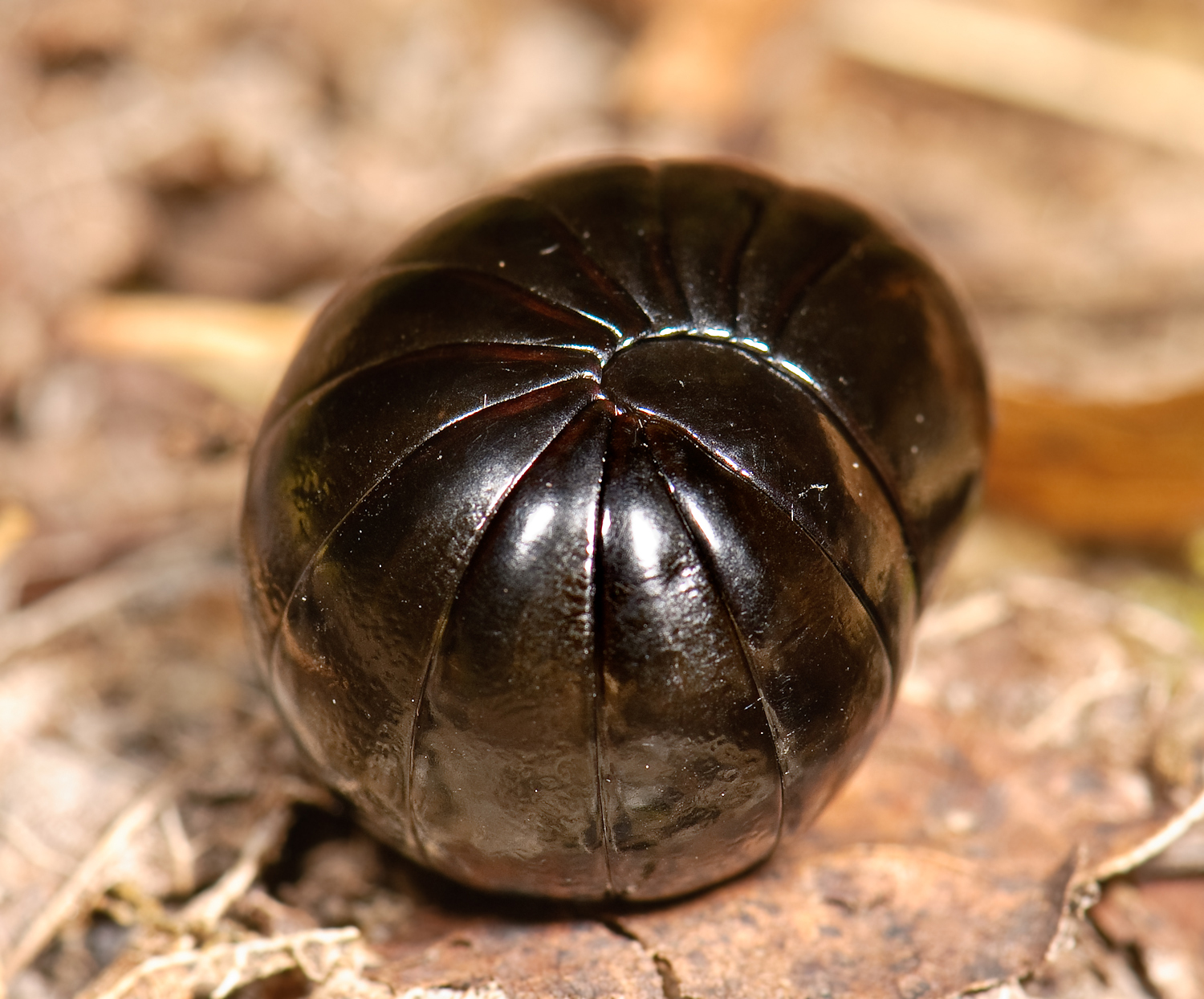
Giant pill millipede in rolled-up position

The rolling-up ability and tough skeletal armor of the Sphaerotheriida offer protection against some predators, but a wide variety of predators feed on them, or even specialise in them as a source of food. Species that specialize in feeding on giant pill millipedes necessarily have evolved special structures or behaviors to overcome their defences. Examples include the South African snail family Chlamydephoridae which almost exclusively feeds on giant pill millipedes Another example is the meerkat (Suricata suricata) which has been reported (at least in captivity) to throw rolled-up sphaerotheriids against rocks in order to break them. This behaviour however, is their way of breaking open many refractory food items, such as snails and hard-shelled eggs.

Apart from the rolling-up behavior of giant pill millipedes, camouflage may be an important defense mechanism against predators that hunt by sight, such as birds.

Sphaerotheriida also are subject to internal parasitism, and several species of nematodes are obligate parasites of particular species of giant pill millipedes.

== Taxonomy ==
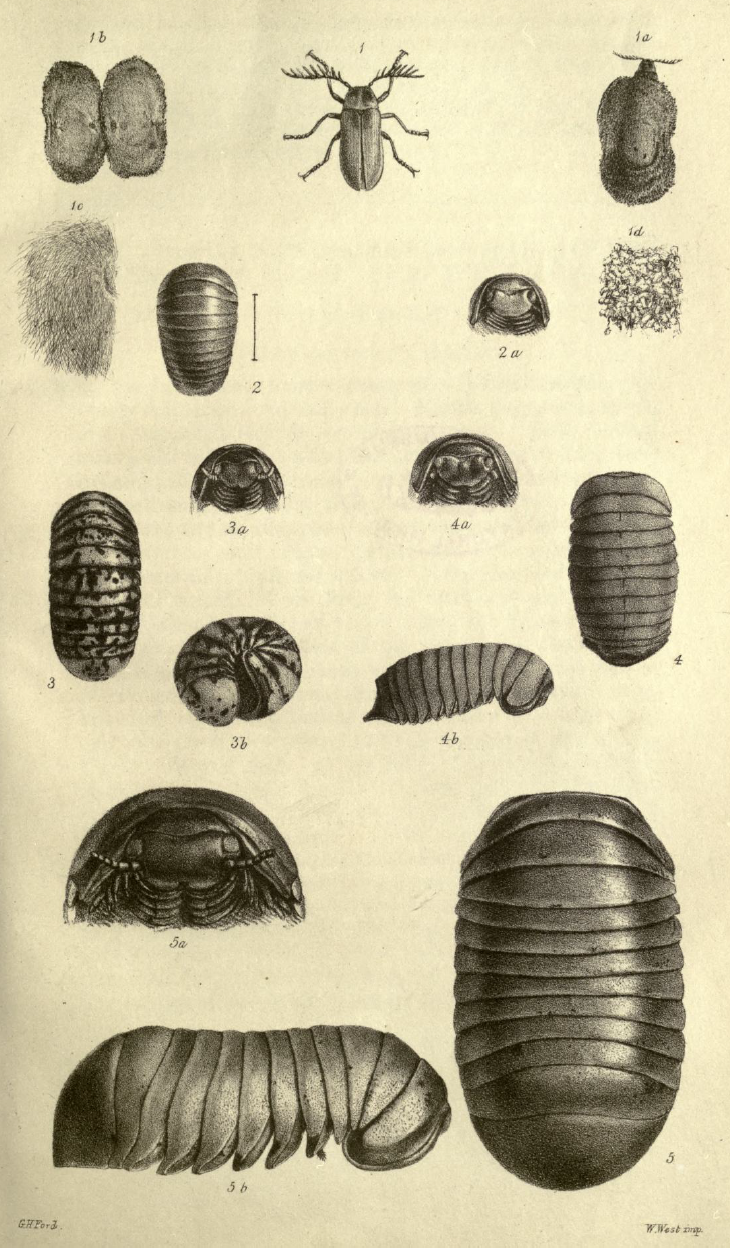
Various sphaerotheriidans (and a beetle) illustrated in 1859

By 2014, over 326 species in around 34 genera in approximately 20 genera had been described.

- Family: Arthrosphaeridae

Arthrosphaera Pocock, 1895 – 40 species, India, Sri Lanka
Zoosphaerium Pocock, 1895 – 55 species, Madagascar
Sphaeromimus de Saussure & Zehntner, 1902 – 10 species, southeast Madagascar
Microsphaerotherium Wesener & van den Spiegel, 2007 – 2 species, Madagascar

- Family: Cyliosomatidae

Cyliosoma Pocock, 1895 – 15 species, Australia
Cynotelopus Jeekel, 1986 – monotypic, southwest Australia

- Family: Procyliosomatidae

Procyliosoma Silvestri, 1917 – 11 species, Eastern Australia, Tasmania, New Zealand

- Family: Sphaerotheriidae

Sphaerotherium Brandt, 1833 – 54 species, South Africa, Zimbabwe
Kylindotherium Attems, 1926 – monotypic, South Africa

- Family: Zephroniidae

Bothrobelum Verhoeff, 1924 – monotypic, Borneo
Cryxus Leach, 1814 – monotypic, Asia
Indosphaera Attems, 1935 – 2 species N. India, Myanmar
Kophosphaera Attems, 1935 – 5 species, N. India, Nepal
Leptotelopus Silvestri, 1897 – monotypic, Myanmar
Prionobelum Verhoeff, 1924 – 8 species, Vietnam, SW China
Sphaerobelum Verhoeff, 1924 – 4 species, Vietnam
Zephronia Gray, 1832 – 37 species N. India, Myanmar, Malayan Peninsula, Java, Sumatra, Borneo
Sphaeropoeus Brandt, 1833 – 22 species, N. India, Myanmar, Malayan Peninsula, Java, Sumatra, Borneo
Tigridosphaera Jeekel, 2000 – 4 species, Malayan Peninsula
Castanotherium Pocock, 1895 – 50 species, Indonesian Islands, Philippines
Castanotheroides Chamberlin, 1921 – 3 species, Philippines
Sechelliosoma Mauriès, 1980 – monotypic, Seychelles
Rajasphaera Attems, 1935 – monotypic, Borneo

== Phylogeny ==
The first modern phylogenetic study of Sphaerotheriida (simplified below) was conducted by Wesener and VandenSpiegel in 2009, using morphological data from 36 species in 10 genera. The South African family Sphaerotheriidae was found to be sister to the Madagascar family Arthrosphaeridae. The Australian genus Procyliosoma was found to be distinct from all other genera and placed in its own family, Procyliosomatidae.

- Pentazonia
  - Glomeridesmida
    Glomeridesmus
  - - Glomerida
      Glomeroides
    - Sphaerotheriida
      - Procyliosomatidae
      - - Zephroniidae
          - Sechelliosoma
          - Sphaeropoeus
          - Zephronia
          - Castanotherium
        - - Sphaerotheriidae
          - Arthrosphaeridae
            - - Sphaeromimus
              - Arthrosphaera
            - - Microsphaerotherium
              - Zoosphaerium
