= List of millipede families =

Millipedes, myriapods of the class Diplopoda, contain approximately 12,000 described species organized into 16 extant orders and approximately 140 families. This list is based on Shear, 2011, sorted alphabetically by order and taxonomically within order.

Note: The names of millipede orders end in "-ida"; suborders end in "-idea". Superfamilies end in "-oidea", while families end in "-idae".

== Callipodida ==
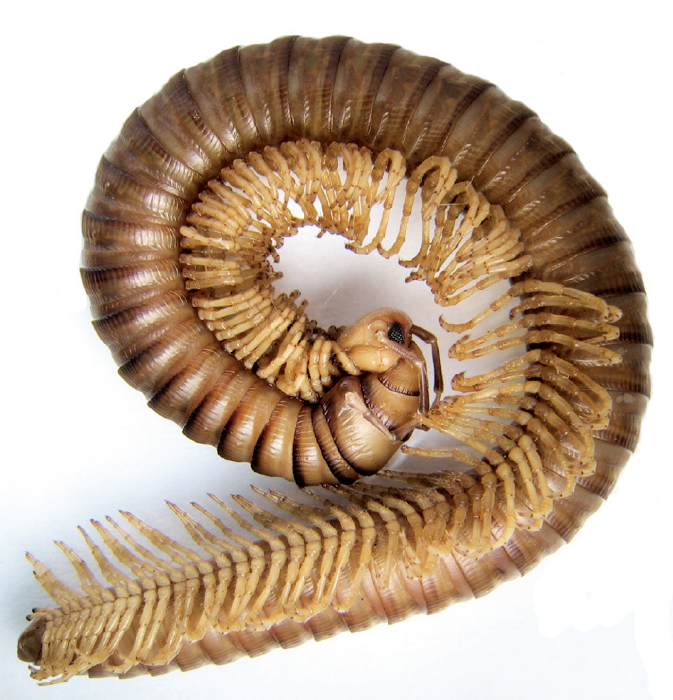
Eurygyrus ochraceus, (Schizopetalidae) a species native to Turkey, introduced in Ukraine

Suborder Callipodidea

- Callipodidae

Suborder Schizopetalidea

- Abacionidae
- Caspiopetalidae
- Dorypetalidae
- Paracortinidae
- Schizopetalidae

Suborder Sinocallipodidea

- Sinocallipodidae

== Chordeumatida ==
=== Suborder Chordeumatidea ===
Superfamily Chordeumatoidea

- Chordeumatidae
- Speophilosomatidae

=== Suborder Craspedosomatidea ===
Superfamily Anthroleucosomatoidea

- Anthroleucosomatidae
- Haasiidae
- Origmatogonidae
- Vandeleumatidae

Superfamily Brannerioidea

- Brachychaeteumatidae
- Branneriidae
- Chamaesomatidae
- Golovatchiidae
- Heterolatzeliidae
- Kashmireumatidae
- Macrochaeteumatidae
- Niponiosomatidae
- Tingupidae
- Trachygonidae

Superfamily Cleidogonoidea

- Biokoviellidae
- Cleidogonidae
- Entomobielziidae
- Lusitaniosomatidae
- Opisthocheiridae
- Trichopetalidae

Superfamily Craspedosomatoidea

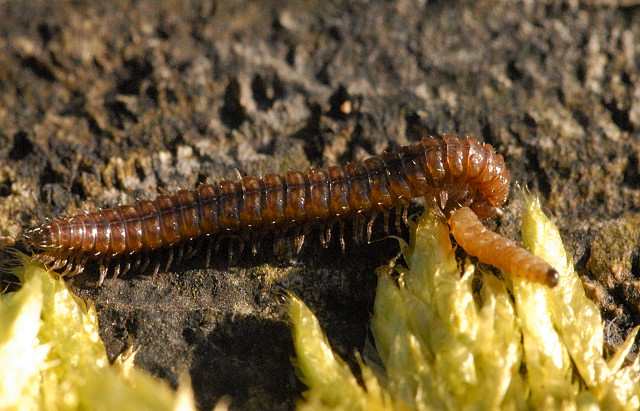
Nanogona (Craspedosomatidae), Belgium

- Attemsiidae
- Craspedosomatidae
- Haplobainosomatidae

Superfamily Haaseoidea

- Haaseidae

Superfamily Neoatractosomatoidea

- Altajellidae
- Faginidae
- Hoffmaneumatidae
- Mastigophorophyllidae
- Neoatractosomatidae

Superfamily Verhoeffioidea

- Verhoeffiidae

=== Suborder Heterochordeumatidea ===
Superfamily Conotyloidea

- Adritylidae
- Conotylidae

Superfamily Diplomaragnoidea

- Diplomaragnidae

Superfamily Heterochordeumatoidea

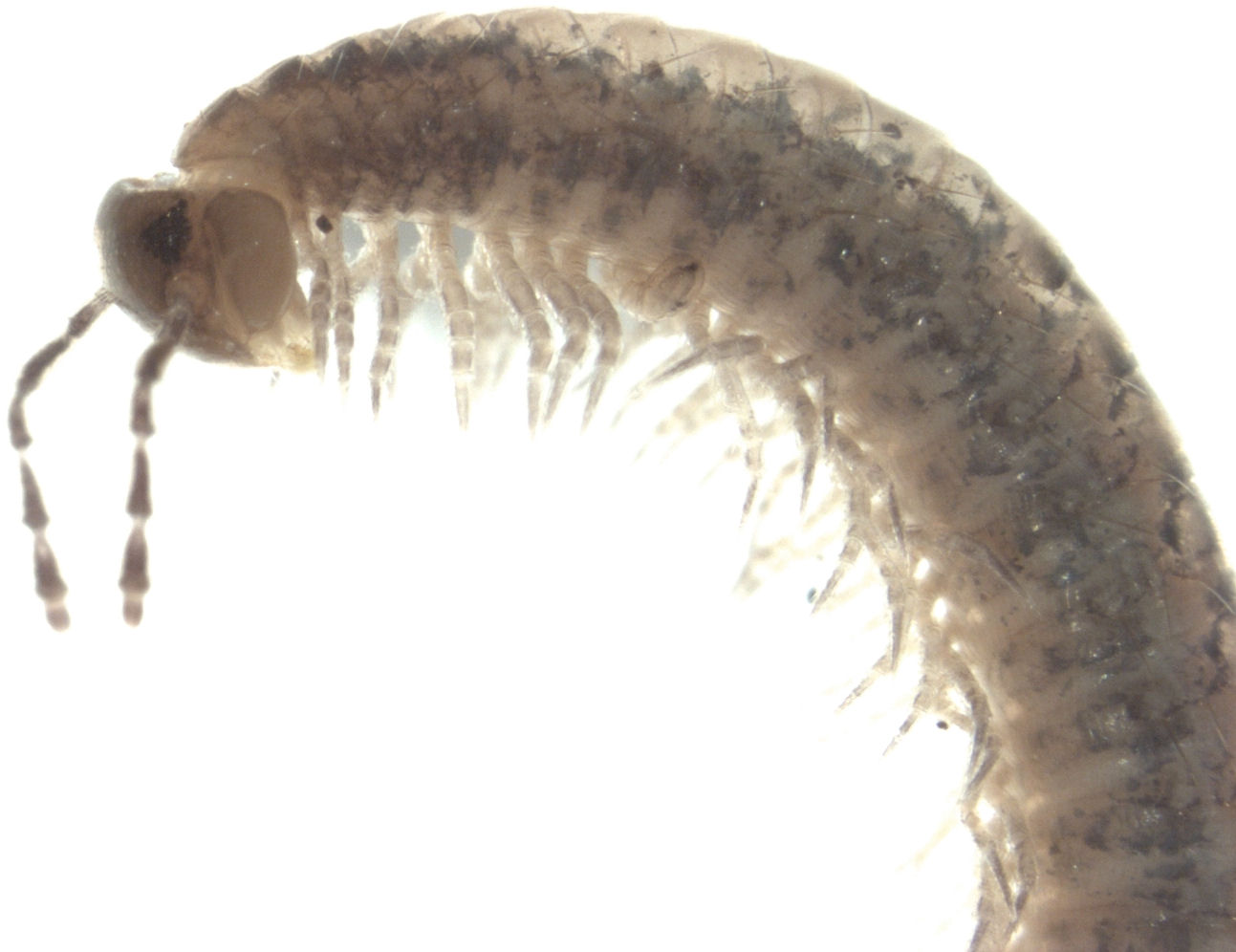
Schedotrigona (Metopidiotrichidae), New Zealand)

- Eudigonidae
- Heterochordeumatidae
- Megalotylidae
- Metopidiotrichidae
- Peterjohnsiidae

Superfamily Pygmaeosomatoidea

- Lankasomatidae
- Pygmaeosomatidae

=== Suborder Striariidea ===
Superfamily Caseyoidea

- Caseyidae
- Urochordeumatidae

Superfamily Striarioidea

- Apterouridae
- Buotidae
- Rhiscosomididae
- Striariidae

== Glomerida ==
Auth.: Leach, 1814; the "pill millipedes"

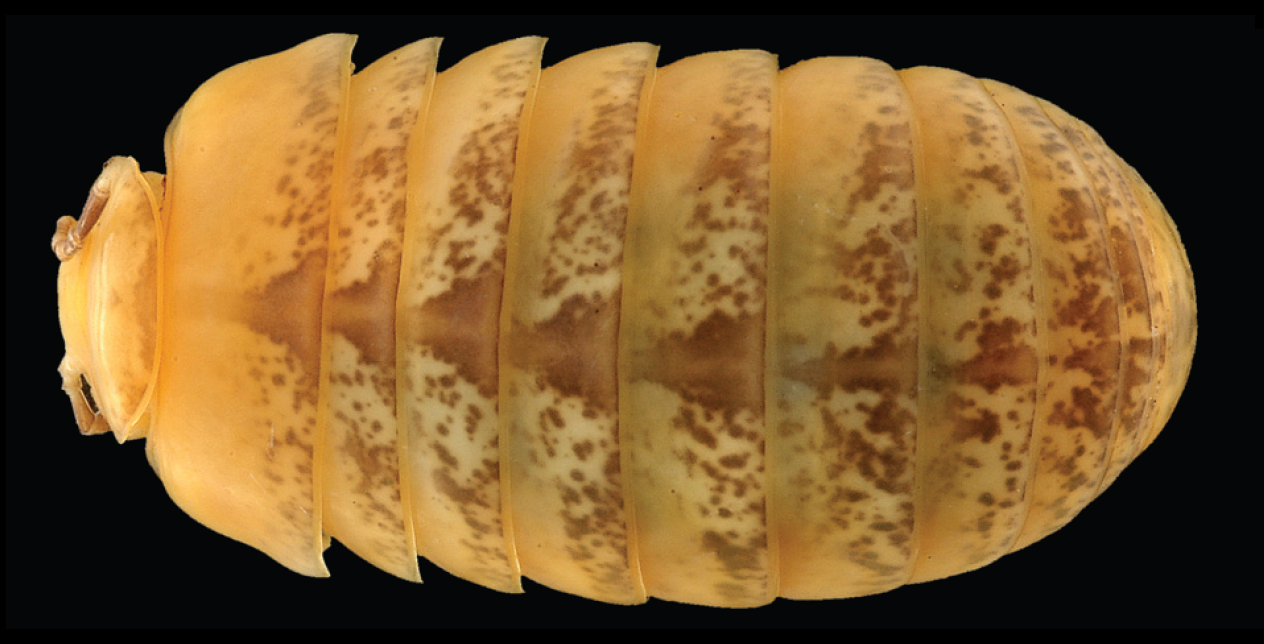
Glomeris klugii, (Glomeridae), Tunisia

- Glomeridae
- Glomeridellidae
- Trachysphaeridae (=Doderiidae) - monotypic Trachysphaera Heller, 1858

== Glomeridesmida ==
- Glomeridesmidae
- Termitodesmidae

== Julida ==
Superfamily Blaniuloidea

- Blaniulidae
- Galliobatidae
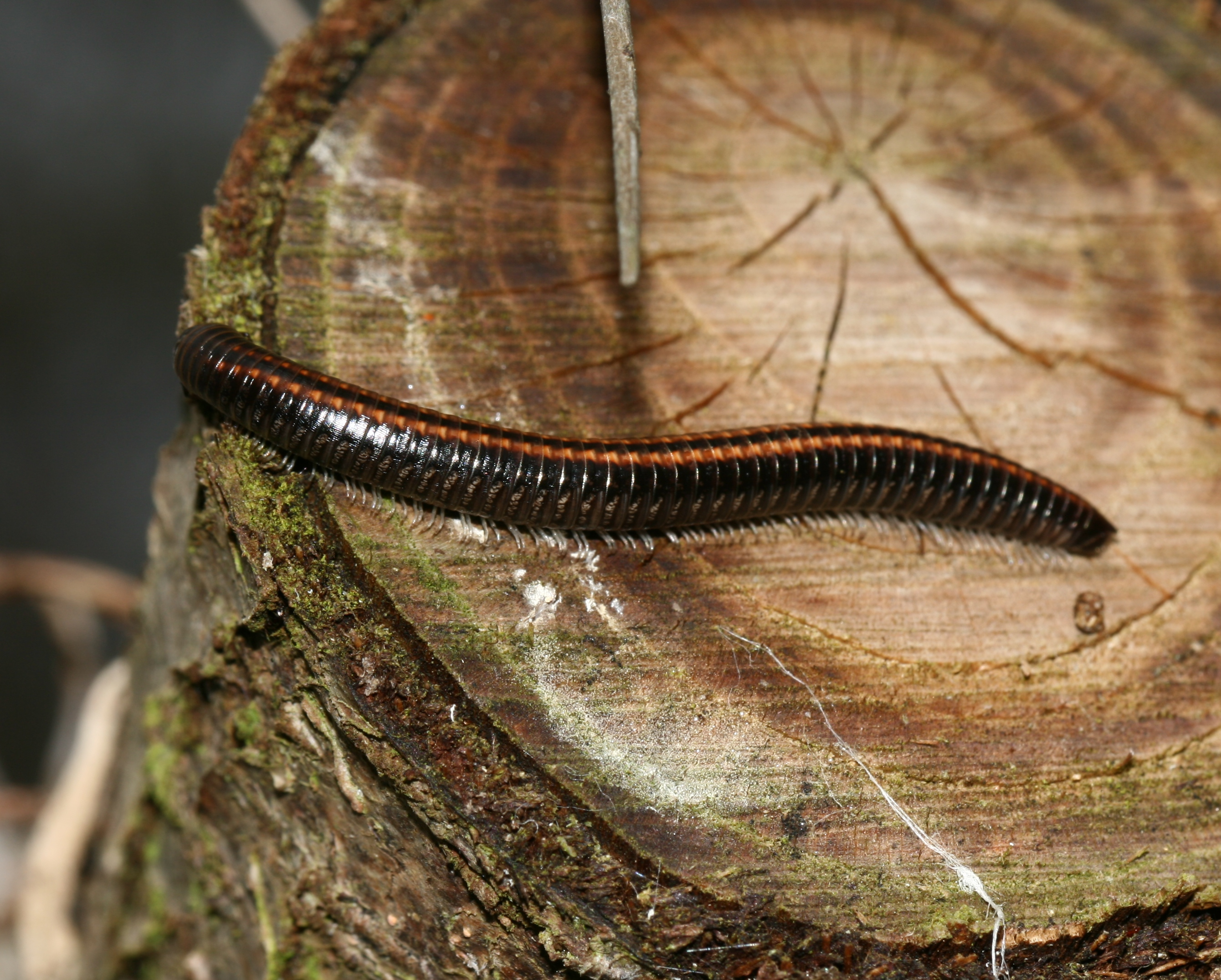
  Ommatoiulus sabulosus (Julidae)
- Okeanobatidae
- Zosteractinidae

Superfamily Juloidea

- Julidae
- Rhopaloiulidae
- Trichoblaniulidae
- Trichonemasomatidae

Superfamily Nemasomatoidea

- Chelojulidae
- Nemasomatidae
- Pseudonemasomatidae
- Telsonemasomatidae

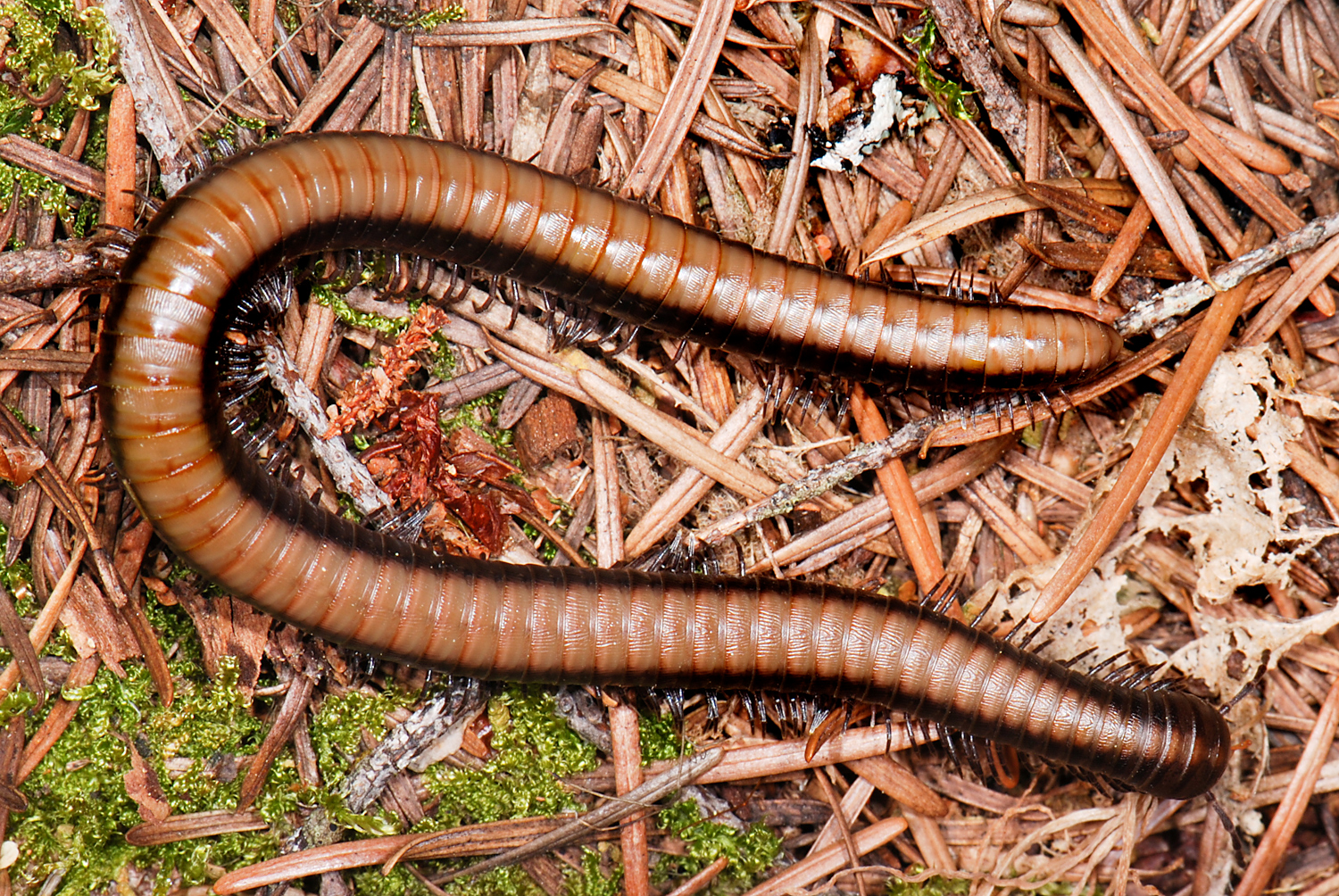
Californiulus chamberlini (Paeromopodidae), California

Superfamily Paeromopodoidea

- Aprosphylosomatidae
- Paeromopodidae

Superfamily Parajuloidea

- Mongoliulidae
- Parajulidae

== Platydesmida ==
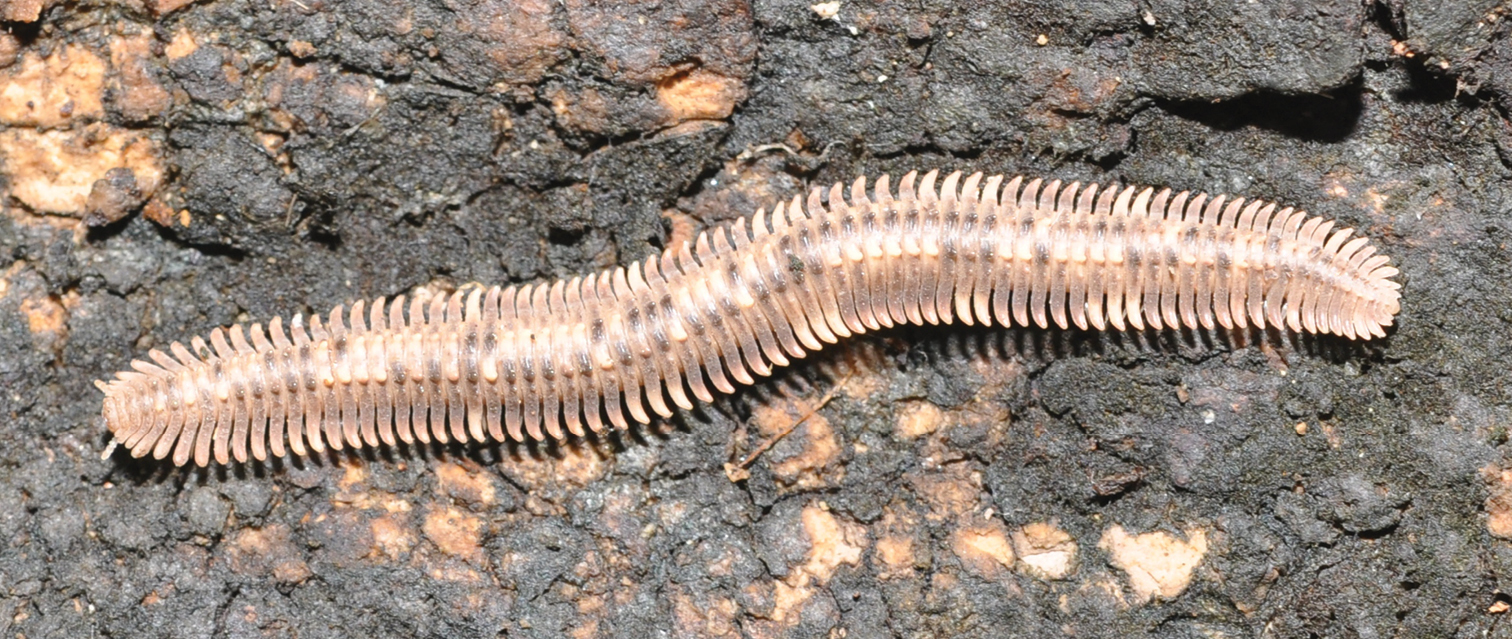
Unidentified platydesmid from Malaysia

- Andrognathidae
- Platydesmidae

== Polydesmida ==
=== Suborder Chelodesmidea (=Leptodesmidea) ===
Superfamily Chelodesmoidea

- Chelodesmidae

Superfamily Platyrhacoidea

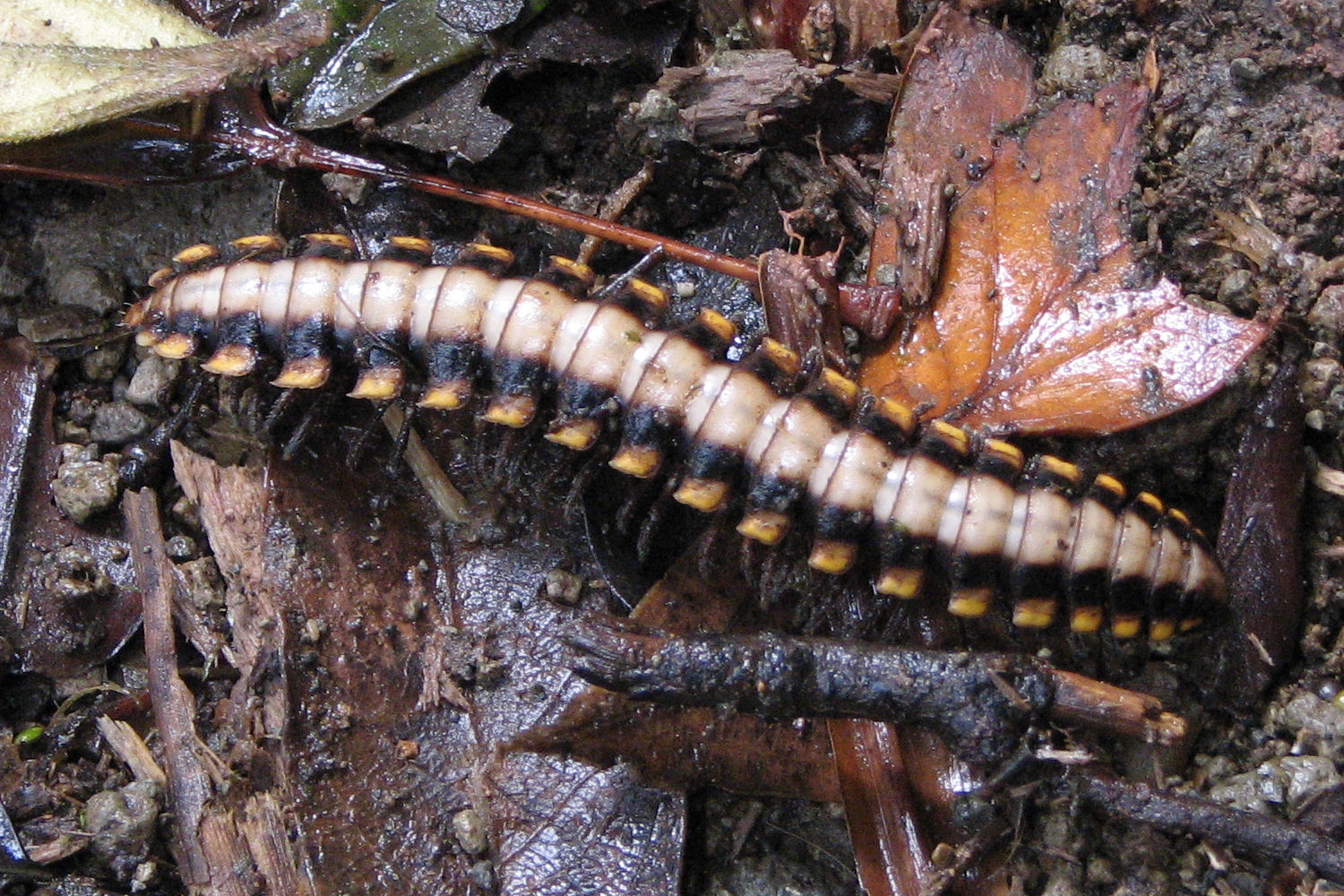
Nyssodesmus python (Platyrhacidae), Costa Rica

- Aphelidesmidae
- Platyrhacidae

Superfamily Rhachodesmoidea

- Rhachodesmidae
- Tridontomidae

Superfamily Sphaeriodesmoidea

- Campodesmidae
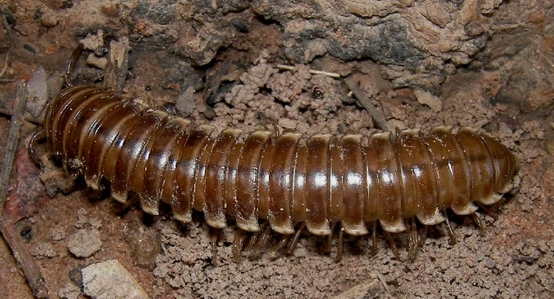
  Tymbodesmus falcatus (Gomphodesmidae), Burkina Faso
- Holistophallidae
- Sphaeriodesmidae

Superfamily Xystodesmoidea

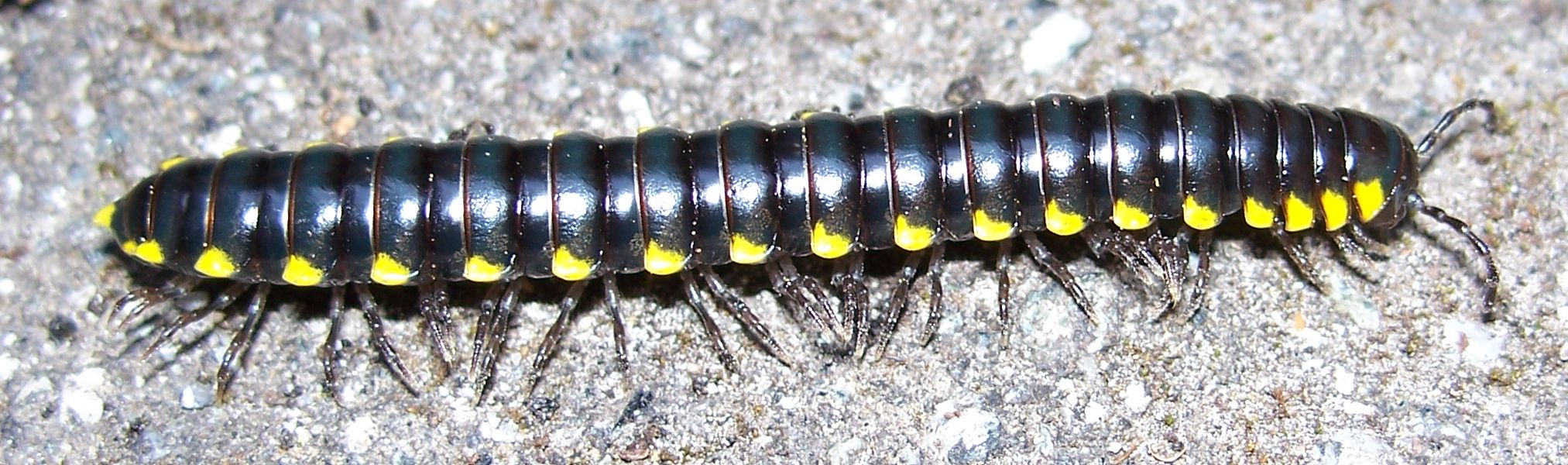
Harpaphe haydeniana (Xystodesmidae)

- Eurymerodesmidae
- Euryuridae
- Gomphodesmidae
- Oxydesmidae
- Xystodesmidae

=== Suborder Dalodesmidea ===
- Dalodesmidae
- Vaalogonopodidae

=== Suborder Paradoxosomatidea (=Strongylosomatidea) ===
- Paradoxosomatidae

=== Suborder Polydesmidea ===
==== Infraorder Oniscodesmoides ====
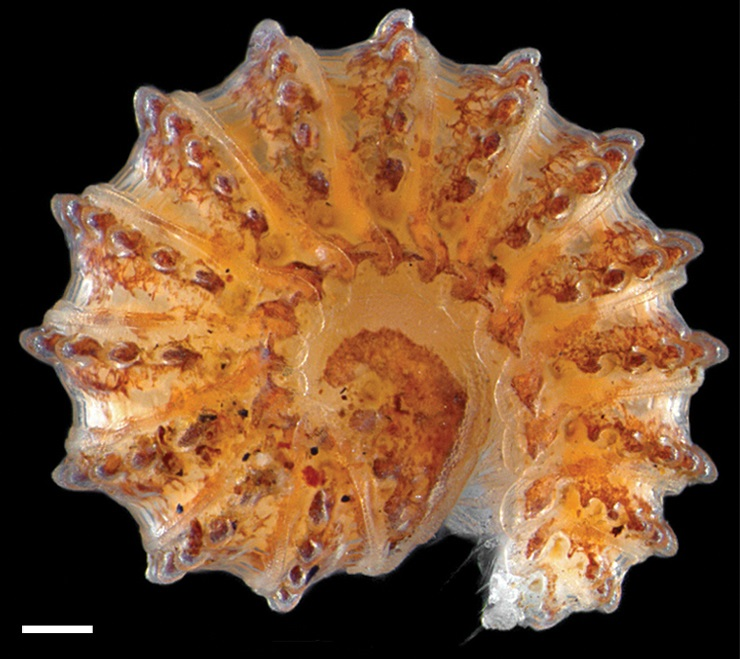
Ammodesmus granum (Ammodesmidae), West Africa

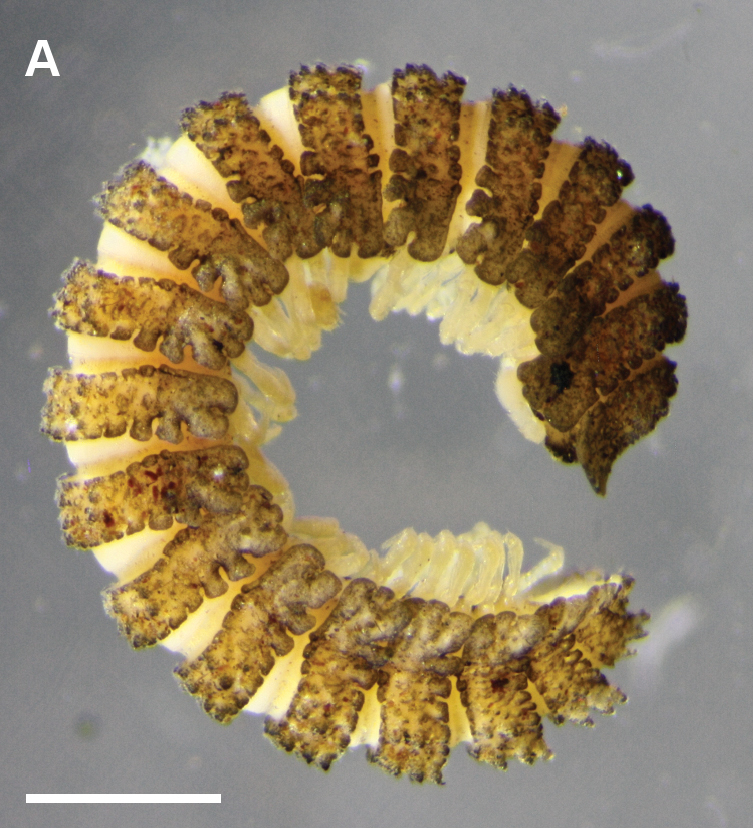
Nephopyrgodesmus eungella (Pyrgodesmidae), Australia

Superfamily Oniscodesmoidea

- Dorsoporidae
- Oniscodesmidae

Superfamily Pyrgodesmoidea

- Ammodesmidae
- Cyrtodesmidae
- Pyrgodesmidae

==== Infraorder Polydesmoides ====
Superfamily Haplodesmoidea

- Haplodesmidae

Superfamily Opisotretoidea

- Opisotretidae
- Polydesmidae
- Cryptodesmidae
- Polydesmidae

Superfamily Trichopolydesmoidea

- Fuhrmannodesmidae
- Macrosternodesmidae
- Nearctodesmidae

== Polyxenida ==
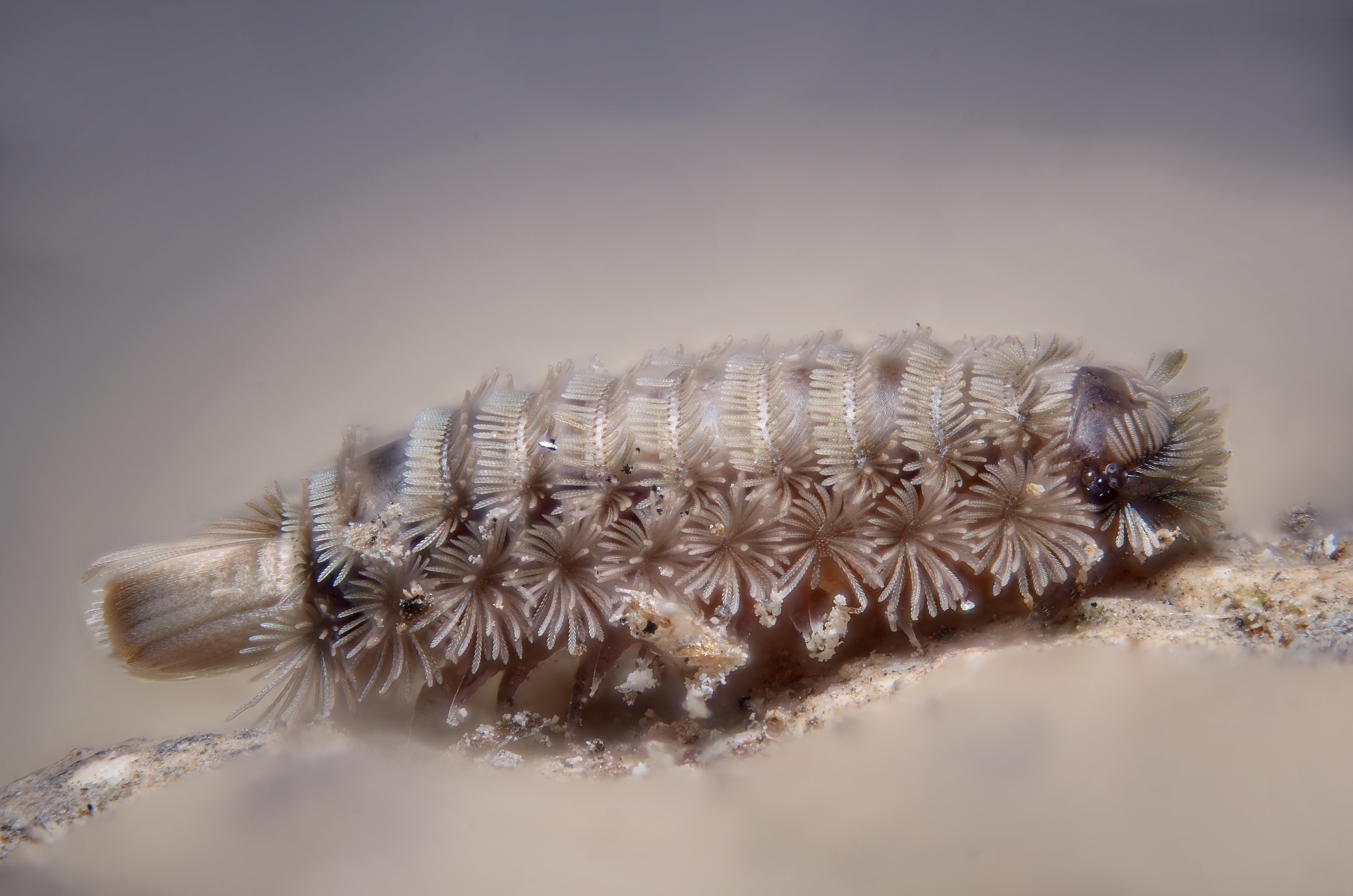
Polyxenus lagurus (Polyxenidae)

Superfamily Polyxenoidea

- Hypogexenidae
- Lophoproctidae
- Polyxenidae

Superfamily Synxenoidea

- Synxenidae

== Polyzoniida ==
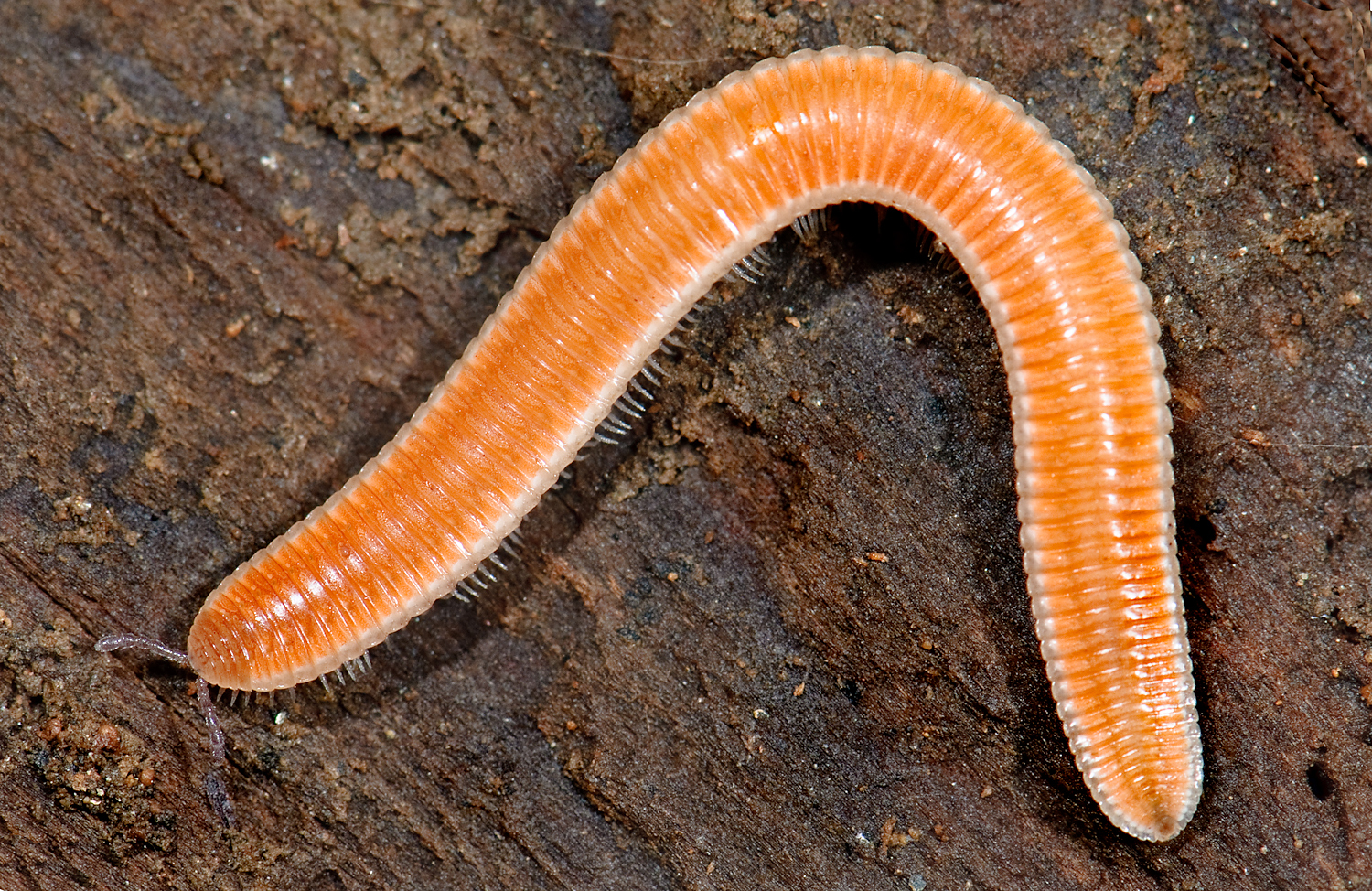
Octoglena sierra (Polyzoniidae), California

- Hirudisomatidae
- Polyzoniidae
- Siphonotidae

== Siphoniulida ==
- Siphoniulidae

== Siphonocryptida ==
- Siphonocryptidae

== Siphonophorida ==
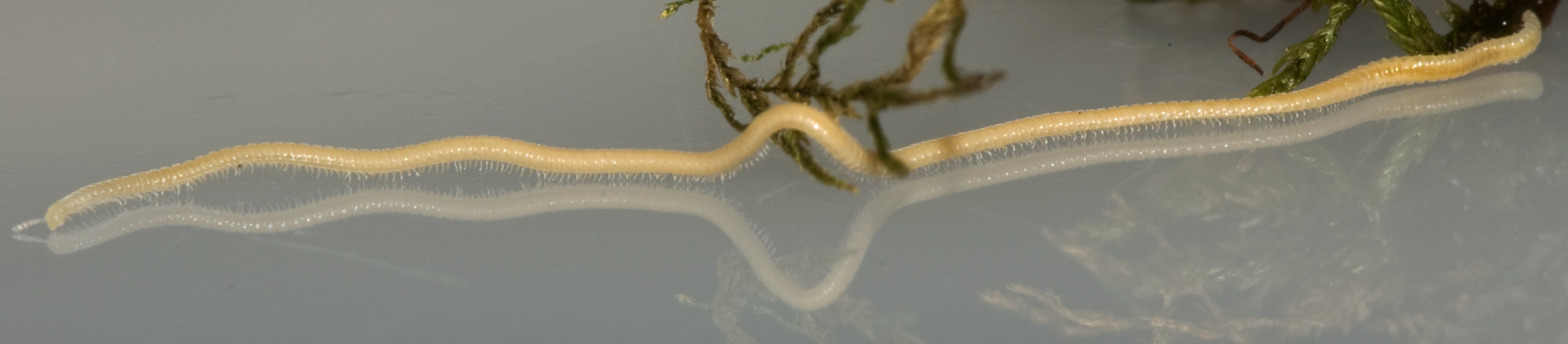
Illacme plenipes (Siphonorhinidae)

- Siphonophoridae
- Siphonorhinidae

== Sphaerotheriida ==
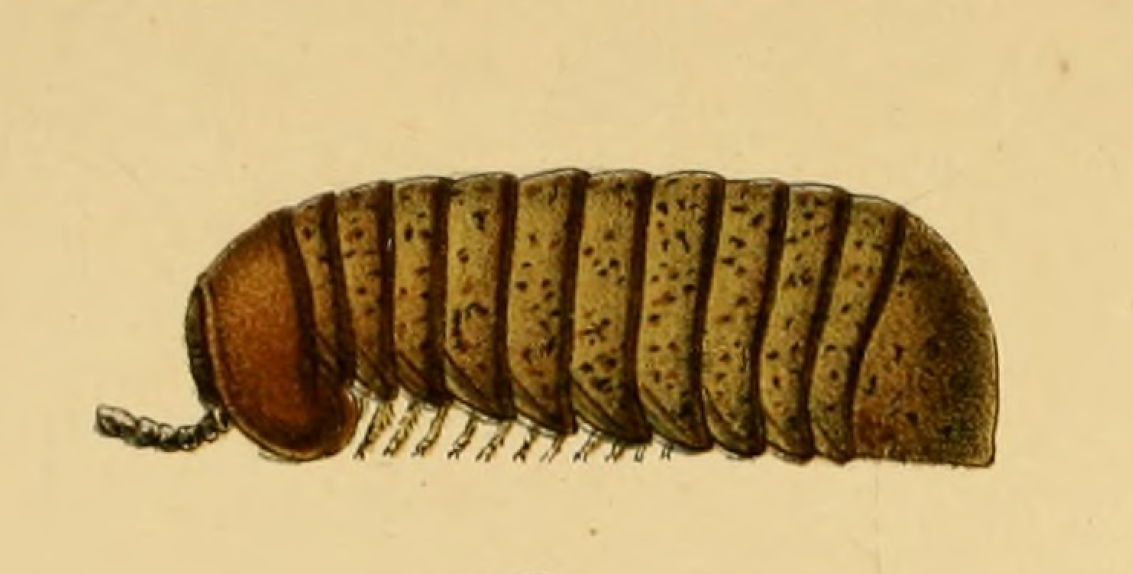
Arthrosphaera thurstoni (Arthrosphaeridae), India

- Arthrosphaeridae
- Procyliosomatidae
- Sphaerotheriidae
- Zephroniidae

== Spirobolida ==
=== Suborder Spirobolidea ===
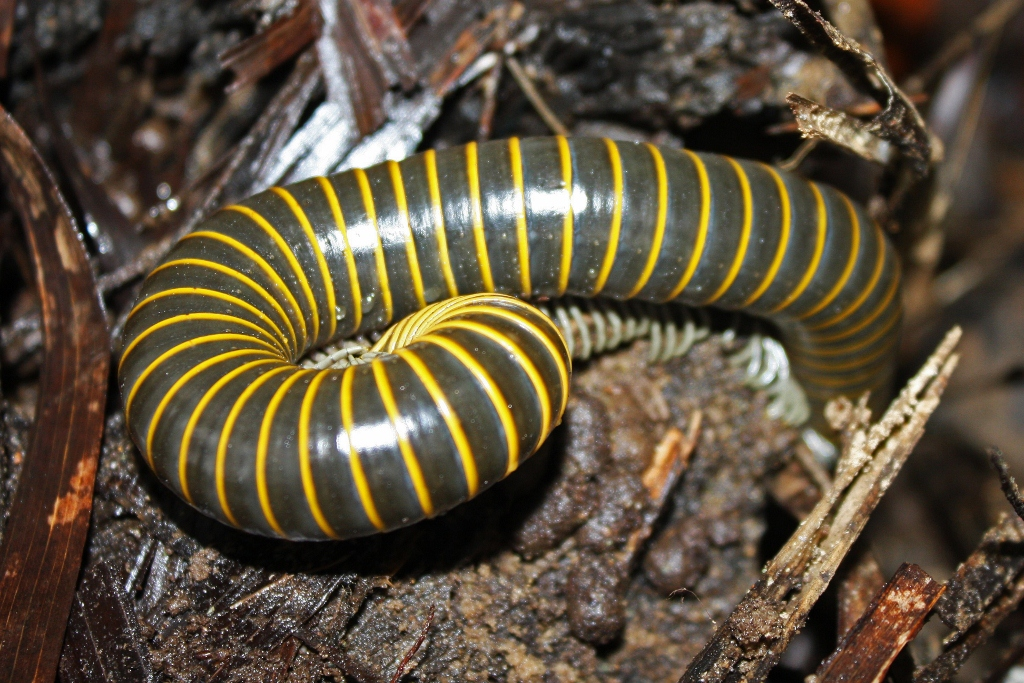
Anadenobolus monilicornis (Rhinocricidae)

- Allopocockiidae
- Atopetholidae
- Floridobolidae
- Hoffmanobolidae
- Messicobolidae
- Pseudospirobolellidae
- Rhinocricidae
- Spirobolellidae
- Spirobolidae
- Typhlobolellidae

=== Suborder Trigoniulidea ===
- Pachybolidae
- Trigoniulidae

== Spirostreptida ==
=== Suborder Cambalidea ===
- Cambalidae
- Cambalopsidae
- Choctellidae
- Iulomorphidae
- Pseudonannolenidae

=== Suborder Spirostreptidea ===
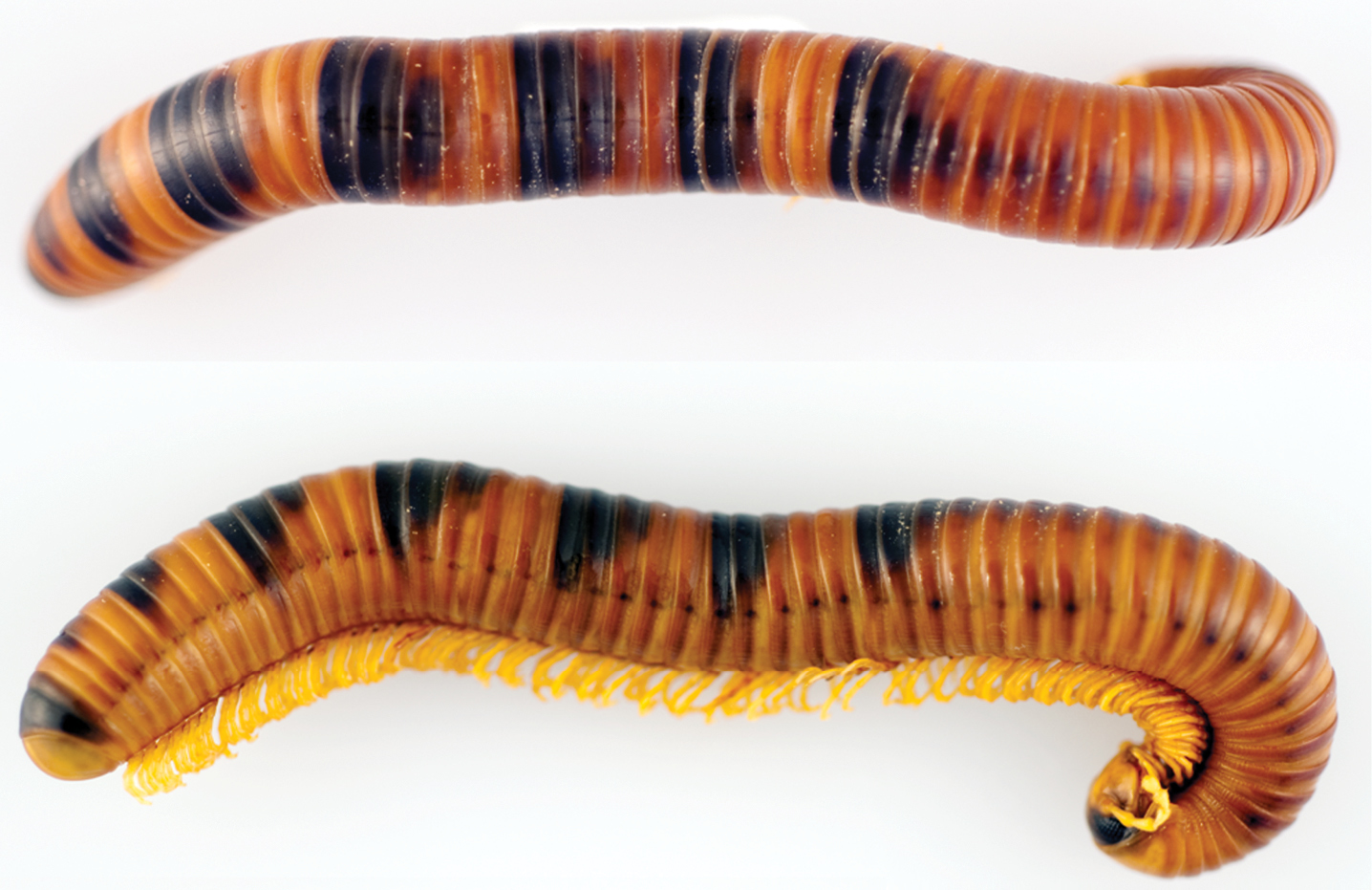
Sagmatostreptus strongylopygus (Spirostreptidae), Tanzania

Superfamily Odontopygoidea

- Atopogestidae
- Odontopygidae

Superfamily Spirostreptoidea

- Adiaphorostreptidae
- Harpagophoridae
- Spirostreptidae

== Stemmiulida ==
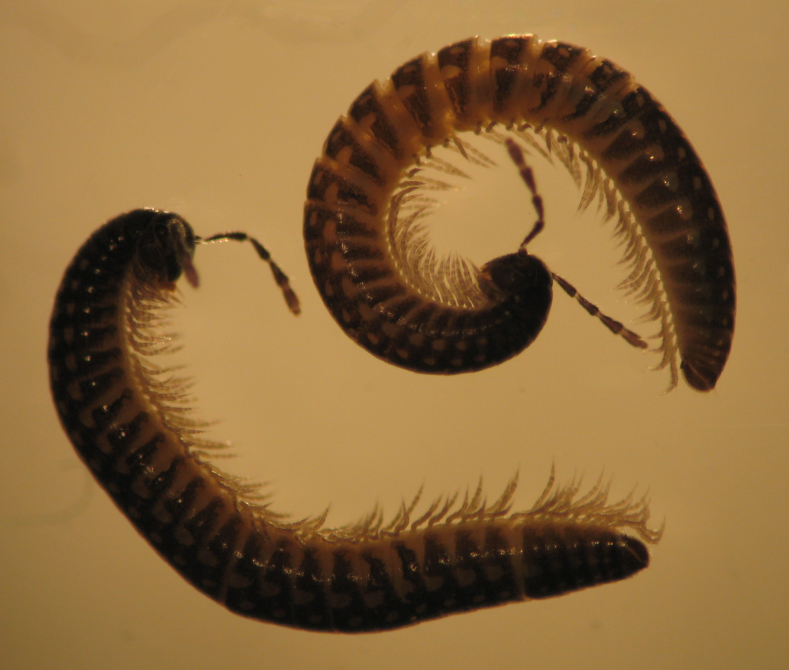
Stemmiulids from Puerto Rico

- Stemmiulidae

== See also ==
Extinct millipede groups

- Archipolypoda
- Arthropleuridea
