= Schizmohetera olympica =

Scientific classification
- Kingdom: Animalia
- Phylum: Arthropoda
- Subphylum: Myriapoda
- Class: Diplopoda
- Order: Chordeumatida
- Family: Neoatractosomatidae
- Genus: Schizmohetera
- Species: S. olympica

Binomial name
- Schizmohetera olympica Mauriès, 2003

Species of millipede

Schizmohetera olympica is a species of millipede in the family Neoatractosomatidae. This species is found in Greece. This species is notable for featuring adults with 28 body segments (counting the collum as the first segment and the telson as the last), rather than the 30 segments usually observed in the order Chordeumatida.

== Discovery ==
This species was first described in 2003 by the French myriapodologist Jean-Paul Mauriès. He based the original description of this species on a male holotype and ten paratypes (one male, six females, two subadults, and one juvenile). An expedition of the Zoological Museum of the University of Copenhagen collected these type specimens in 1990 on the slopes of Mount Olympus in northern Greece. The species name refers to this type locality. Two paratypes (one male and one female) are deposited at the Muséum National dHistoire Naturelle in Paris; the holotype and the other paratypes are deposited at the Zoological Museum of the University of Copenhagen.

== Description ==
This millipede is white except for traces of reddish pigment on the antennae and head, especially behind and around the eyes, which are black. The adult male specimens range from 13.0 mm to 13.3 mm in length, whereas the adult females range from 13.0 mm to 16.4 mm in length. The body and antennae are slender. The antennae are very long, twice the width of the larger body segments. The eyes in adults are triangular fields of 16 to 21 ocelli arranged in seven or eight rows.

This species features only 28 body segments (including the telson) in adults of each sex. The adult females feature only 46 pairs of legs, and the adult males feature 44 pairs of walking legs, excluding the eighth and ninth leg pairs, which become gonopods and paragonopods, respectively. The paranota are located a little above the middle of the side of the trunk segments. The tergites feature three pairs of setae on each body segment that are markedly smaller on the collum but otherwise generally long, with lengths sometimes reaching one-third the width of the tergite. The walking legs are slender and long, each with a claw and a straight accessory spine that is four-fifths as long as the claw.

The gonopods take the form of two pairs of elongated and curved projections, with the anterior pair (cheirites) longer than the posterior pair (colpocoxites). These projections are flanked by two long flagella that each run along a longitudinal groove on the lateral side of the adjacent cheirite. Each cheirite features a distal end shaped like an arrowhead. The paragonopods are reduced to stumps, with the distal end of each cheirite hidden in a longitudinally elongated cavity on the anterior side of the distal end of the corresponding paragonopod.

This species shares a distinctive set of traits with Schizmohetera sketi, the type species in the same genus. For example, both species feature long flagella running through longitudinal grooves on the lateral sides of elongated cheirites. Furthermore, both species feature a longitudinally elongated cavity on the anterior side of the distal end of each paragonopod that hides the distal end of the corresponding cheirite.

These two species can be distinguished, however, based on other traits. For example, ocelli are present in S. olympica but absent in S. sketi. Furthermore, adults feature the usual 30 body segments in S. sketi but only 28 segments in S. olympica. Moreover, the distal end of each cheirite is shaped like an arrow in S. olympica but not in S. sketi.
