= Cleidogona fustis =

Scientific classification
- Kingdom: Animalia
- Phylum: Arthropoda
- Subphylum: Myriapoda
- Class: Diplopoda
- Order: Chordeumatida
- Family: Cleidogonidae
- Genus: Cleidogona
- Species: C. fustis

Binomial name
- Cleidogona fustis Cook & Collins, 1895

Species of millipede

Cleidogona fustis is a species of millipede in the family Cleidogonidae.
