= Conotyla blakei =

Scientific classification
- Domain: Eukaryota
- Kingdom: Animalia
- Phylum: Arthropoda
- Subphylum: Myriapoda
- Class: Diplopoda
- Order: Chordeumatida
- Family: Conotylidae
- Genus: Conotyla
- Species: C. blakei

Binomial name
- Conotyla blakei (Verhoeff, 1932)

Species of millipede

Conotyla blakei is a species of millipede in the family Conotylidae. It is found in North America.
