= Amplaria staceyi =

Scientific classification
- Kingdom: Animalia
- Phylum: Arthropoda
- Subphylum: Myriapoda
- Class: Diplopoda
- Order: Chordeumatida
- Family: Striariidae
- Subfamily: Striariinae
- Genus: Amplaria
- Species: A. staceyi

Binomial name
- Amplaria staceyi Shear, 2021

Species of millipede

Amplaria staceyi is a species of millipede in the family Striariidae. It is found on Palomar Mountain and is endemic to California. It was described by William Shear in 2021.

== Etymology ==
The specific name of the species, staceyi, is in honour of B. J. Stacey, an avid naturalist and citizen science contributor for his contribution to science and being one of the collectors of the species.

== Description ==
The length is about 9 millimeters and the width is about 0.85 millimeters. There are five black ommatidia located in a triangular patch. The labrum does not have hooks. The females are similar to males in nonsexual characteristics.
