= Macrochaetosoma bertiscea =

Scientific classification
- Kingdom: Animalia
- Phylum: Arthropoda
- Subphylum: Myriapoda
- Class: Diplopoda
- Order: Chordeumatida
- Family: Anthogonidae
- Genus: Macrochaetosoma
- Species: M. bertiscea

Binomial name
- Macrochaetosoma bertiscea Antić & Makarov, 2015

Species of millipede

Macrochaetosoma bertiscea is a species of sausage millipede in the family Anthogonidae. It is found in Montenegro.

== Distribution ==
This species is endemic to Montenegro. It has been recorded from two localities : Gorniča Pit, Ćaf Borit, Bjelič Massif, Prokletije Mountains, and Jama od Karimana Pit, Kučke Planine Mountains.
