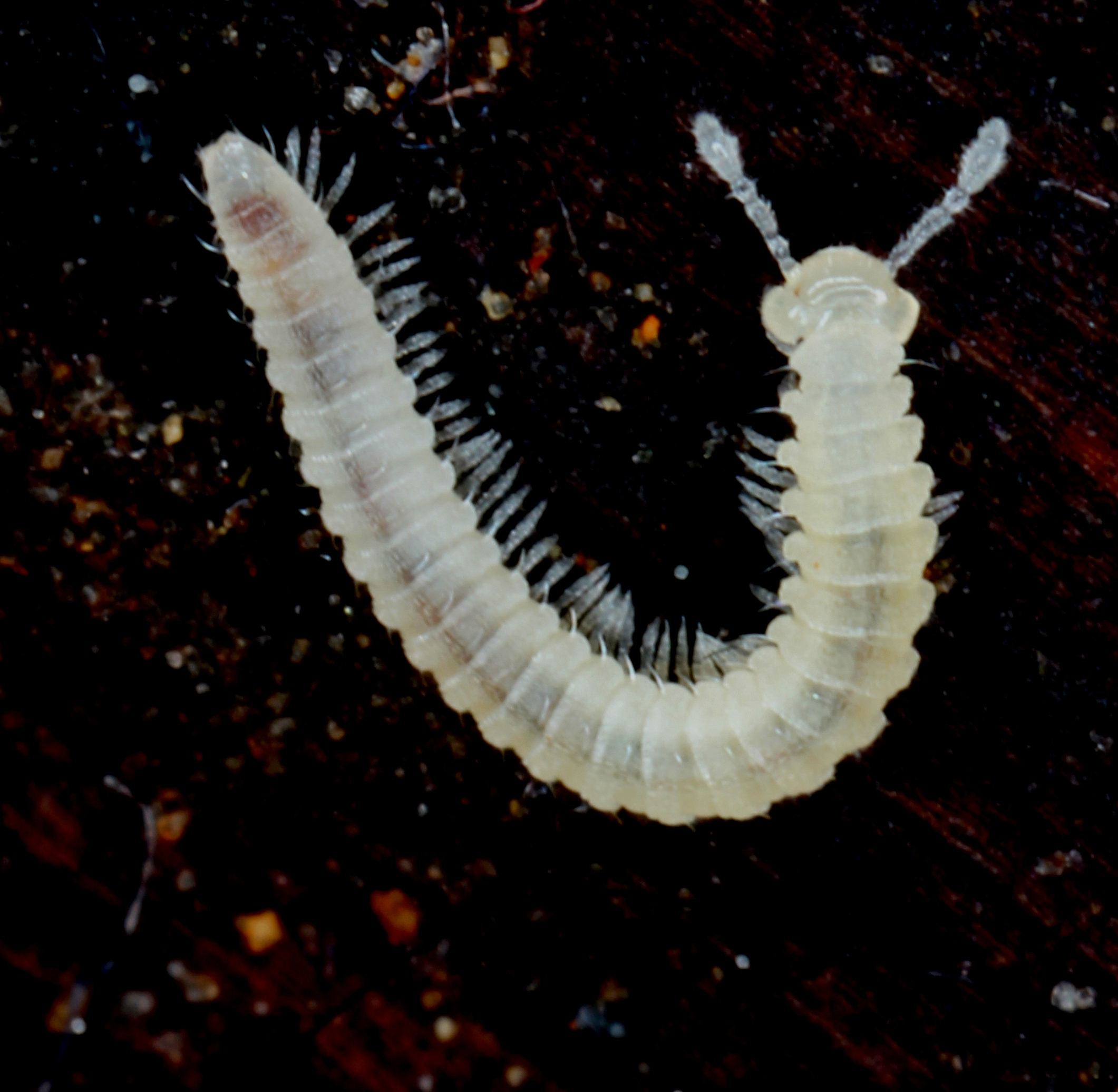

Scientific classification
- Domain: Eukaryota
- Kingdom: Animalia
- Phylum: Arthropoda
- Subphylum: Myriapoda
- Class: Diplopoda
- Order: Chordeumatida
- Family: Conotylidae
- Genus: Conotyla; Cook & Collins, 1895

= Conotyla =

Genus of millipedes

Conotyla is a genus of millipedes in the family Conotylidae. There are about 15 described species in Conotyla.

== Species ==
These 15 species belong to the genus Conotyla:

- Conotyla aeto Shear, 1971
- Conotyla blakei (Verhoeff, 1932)
- Conotyla bollmani (McNeill, 1887)
- Conotyla celeno Shear, 1971
- Conotyla elpenor Shear, 1971
- Conotyla fischeri Cook & Collins, 1895
- Conotyla jonesi Chamberlin, 1951
- Conotyla melinda Hoffman, 1971
- Conotyla ocypetes Shear, 1971
- Conotyla personata Shear, 1971
- Conotyla smilax Shear, 1971
- Conotyla vaga Loomis, 1939
- Conotyla venetia Hoffman, 1961
- Conotyla vista Shear, 1971
- Conotyla wyandotte (Bollman, 1888)
