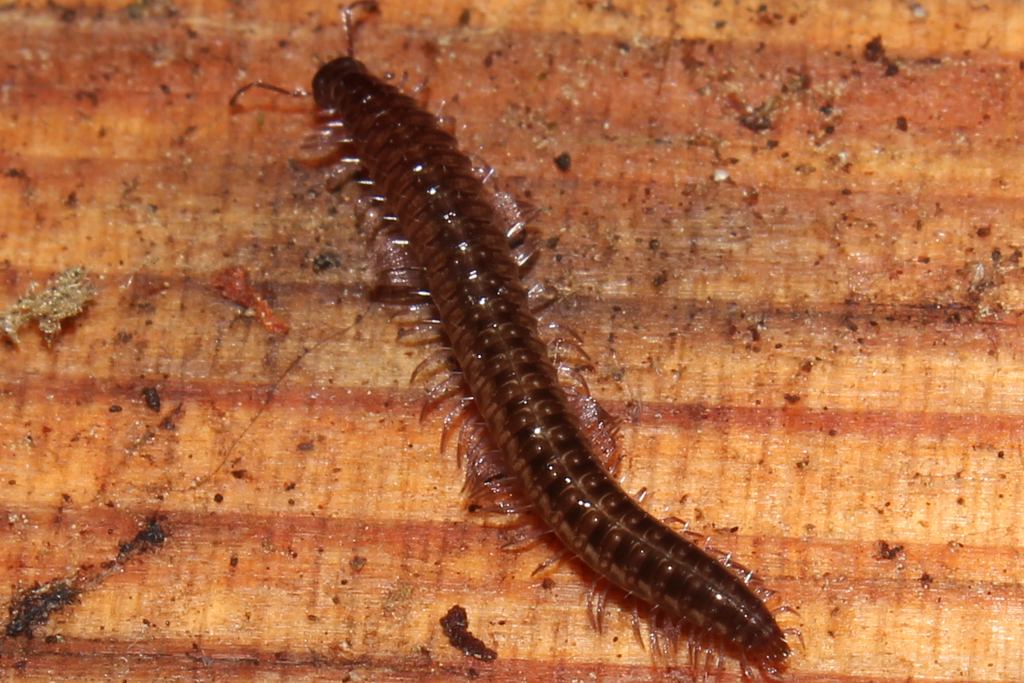

Scientific classification
- Kingdom: Animalia
- Phylum: Arthropoda
- Subphylum: Myriapoda
- Class: Diplopoda
- Order: Chordeumatida
- Family: Cleidogonidae
- Genus: Cleidogona; Cook, 1895

Diversity
- see text

= Cleidogona =

Genus of millipedes

Cleidogona is a genus of millipedes in the family Cleidogonidae.

== Species ==
Cleidogona contains the following species:

- Cleidogona accretis Shear, 1972
- Cleidogona alata Causey, 1961
- Cleidogona arco Shear, 1986
- Cleidogona arkansana Causey, 1954
- Cleidogona atoyaca Chamberlin, 1943
- Cleidogona atropos Shear, 1972
- Cleidogona australis Loomis, 1966
- Cleidogona austrina (Loomis, 1964)
- Cleidogona bacillipus (Chamberlin & Mulaik, 1941)
- Cleidogona baroqua Shear, 1972
- Cleidogona bifurca Loomis, 1974
- Cleidogona caesioannulata (Wood, 1865)
- Cleidogona camazotz Shear, 1972
- Cleidogona caroliniana Causey, 1957
- Cleidogona ceibana Chamberlin, 1922
- Cleidogona celerita Williams & Hefner, 1928
- Cleidogona chac Shear, 1986
- Cleidogona chacmool Shear, 1972
- Cleidogona chiapas Shear, 1982
- Cleidogona chilhoweensis Snyder& Shear, 2025
- Cleidogona chontala Shear, 1972
- Cleidogona coatlicue Shear, 1986
- Cleidogona columbicauda Snyder&Shear, 2025
- Cleidogona conotyloides Shear, 1972
- Cleidogona crucis (Chamberlin, 1942)
- Cleidogona crystallina Shear, 1972
- Cleidogona curvipes (Loomis, 1966)
- Cleidogona cyclipes Loomis, 1969
- Cleidogona decurva Shear, 1972
- Cleidogona eulalia Shear, 1982
- Cleidogona felipiana Shear, 1973
- Cleidogona fidelitor Shear, 1972
- Cleidogona forceps Cook & Collins, 1895
- Cleidogona forficula Shear, 1972
- Cleidogona fustis Cook & Collins, 1895
- Cleidogona georgia Shear, 1972
- Cleidogona godmani Pocock, 1910
- Cleidogona grenada Shear, 1972
- Cleidogona gucumatz Shear, 1972
- Cleidogona hadena Causey, 1961
- Cleidogona hauatla Shear, 1972
- Cleidogona hendrixi Snyder&Shear, 2025
- Cleidogona hoffmani Shear, 1972
- Cleidogona huebnerae Shear, 2013
- Cleidogona hunapu Shear, 1977
- Cleidogona inexpectata Hoffman, 1950
- Cleidogona jamesoni Shear, 1982
- Cleidogona jocassee Hoffman, 1950
- Cleidogona lachesis Shear, 1972
- Cleidogona laminata Cook & Collins, 1895
- Cleidogona laquinta Shear, 1972
- Cleidogona leona Chamberlin, 1943
- Cleidogona maculata (Verhoeff, 1926)
- Cleidogona major Cook & Collins, 1895
- Cleidogona mandeli Chamberlin, 1952
- Cleidogona margarita Hoffman, 1950
- Cleidogona mayapec Shear, 1972
- Cleidogona medialis Shelley, 1976
- Cleidogona mexicana (Humbert & De Saussure, 1869)
- Cleidogona minima Causey, 1951
- Cleidogona minutissima Kraus, 1954
- Cleidogona mirabilis (Kraus, 1954)
- Cleidogona mississippiana Chamberlin, 1942
- Cleidogona mixteca Shear, 1972
- Cleidogona moderata Causey, 1957
- Cleidogona nantahala Shear, 1972
- Cleidogona nueva Chamberlin, 1941
- Cleidogona pecki Shear, 1972
- Cleidogona pochteca Shear, 1986
- Cleidogona punctifer Chamberlin, 1952
- Cleidogona rafaela Chamberlin, 1943
- Cleidogona revilla Shear, 1986
- Cleidogona saripa Causey, 1961
- Cleidogona sayana (Bollman, 1893)
- Cleidogona scandens Hoffman, 1975
- Cleidogona secreta Causey, 1957
- Cleidogona sparta Snyder&Shear, 2025
- Cleidogona steno Shear, 1972
- Cleidogona stolli Pocock, 1910
- Cleidogona sublettei Causey, 1954
- Cleidogona tajumulco Chamberlin, 1952
- Cleidogona tallapoosa Shear, 1972
- Cleidogona tequila Shear, 1972
- Cleidogona tizoc Shear, 1972
- Cleidogona totonaca Shear, 1972
- Cleidogona treacyae Shear, 1982
- Cleidogona unita Causey, 1951
- Cleidogona varicornis (Loomis, 1959)
- Cleidogona vudii Cope, 1869
- Cleidogona wrayi Causey, 1957
- Cleidogona xolotl Shear, 1972
- Cleidogona yerbabuena Shear, 1982
- Cleidogona zapoteca Shear, 1972
- Cleidogona zempoala Chamberlin, 1943
- Cleidogona zimapaniensis Causey, 1957
