= Mastigophorophyllon =

Scientific classification
- Domain: Eukaryota
- Kingdom: Animalia
- Phylum: Arthropoda
- Subphylum: Myriapoda
- Class: Diplopoda
- Order: Chordeumatida
- Family: Mastigophorophyllidae
- Genus: Mastigophorophyllon; Verhoeff, 1897

Genus of many-legged arthropods

Mastigophorophyllon is a genus of millipedes belonging to the family Mastigophorophyllidae.

The species of this genus are found in Europe.

Species:

- Mastigophorophyllon aberratum Ceuca, 1985
- Mastigophorophyllon alpivagum (Verhoeff, 1897)
