= Macrochaetosoma =

Scientific classification
- Kingdom: Animalia
- Phylum: Arthropoda
- Subphylum: Myriapoda
- Class: Diplopoda
- Order: Chordeumatida
- Family: Anthogonidae
- Genus: Macrochaetosoma; Absolon & Lang, 1933

Genus of millipedes

Macrochaetosoma is a genus of sausage millipedes in the family Anthogonidae.It is found in Western Balkans.

== Systematics ==
This genus consists of 3 species:

- Macrochaetosoma bertiscea Antć & Makarov, 2015 (Montenegro)
- Macrochaetosoma drinae Strasser, 1962 (Bosnia and Hercegovina)
- Macrochaetosoma troglomontanum Absolon & Lang, 1933 (Albania, Bosnia and Hercegovina, Croatia and Montenegro)
