= Achemenides (millipede) =

Scientific classification
- Kingdom: Animalia
- Phylum: Arthropoda
- Subphylum: Myriapoda
- Class: Diplopoda
- Order: Chordeumatida
- Family: Conotylidae
- Subfamily: Austrotylinae
- Genus: Achemenides; Shear, 1971

Genus of millipedes

Achemenides is a genus of millipedes in the family Conotylidae. There is at least one described species in Achemenides, A. pectinatus.
