= Schizmohetera =

Scientific classification
- Kingdom: Animalia
- Phylum: Arthropoda
- Subphylum: Myriapoda
- Class: Diplopoda
- Order: Chordeumatida
- Family: Neoatractosomatidae
- Genus: Schizmohetera; Mršić, 1987

Type species
- Schizmohetera sketi Mršić, 1987

Species
- Schizmohetera curcici; Schizmohetera olympica; Schizmohetera sketi

Genus of millipedes

Schizmohetera is a genus of millipedes in the family Neoatractosomatidae. This genus contains three accepted species. These millipedes are found in North Macedonia and Greece.

== Discovery and distribution ==
This genus was proposed in 1987 by the Slovene biologist Narcis Mršić to contain the newly discovered type species S. sketi. This millipede is a cave-dwelling species found on Mount Bistra in western North Macedonia. In 2001, the Serbian myriapodologist Slobodan E. Makarov described the second species in this genus, S. curcici. This millipede is also a cave-dwelling species found on Mount Bistra. Some authorities, however, express doubts about the validity of this species because the gonopods of the single male specimen described appear to be underdeveloped. In 2003, the French myriapodologist Jean-Paul Mauriès described the third species in this genus, S. olympica. This millipede is an epigean species found on Mount Olympus in northern Greece.

== Description ==
Adult millipedes in this genus can have either 28 or 30 segments (counting the collum as the first segment and the telson as the last). Males range from 13 mm to 15 mm in length, whereas females range from 13 mm to 18 mm in length. These millipedes feature antennae and legs that are elongated and slender. The tergites also feature long setae that are at least one-third as long as the tergites are wide.

In adult males in this genus, the eighth pair of legs become gonopods, and the ninth leg pair become paragonopods. The gonopods take the form of two pairs of elongated and curved projections, with the anterior pair (cheirites) longer than the posterior pair (colpocoxites). These projections are flanked by two long flagella that each run along a longitudinal groove on the lateral side of the adjacent cheirite. The distal end of each cheirite is hidden in a concavity on the anterior side of the distal end of the corresponding paragonopod.

This genus shares a distinctive set of traits with the genus Fagina, placing these two genera together in the tribe Faginini. For example, both genera feature flagella running through longitudinal grooves on the lateral sides of elongated cheirites. Furthermore, both genera feature anterior cavities at the distal end of the paragonopods.

Millipedes in the genus Schizmohetera can be distinguished from those in the genus Fagina, however, based on other traits. For example, the cheirites are coupled with a pair of colpocoxites in Schizmohetera but not in Fagina. Furthermore, the setae on the tergites in Fagina are only one-fifth as long as the tergites are wide, shorter than the corresponding setae in Schizmohetera. Moreover, the legs and antennae are elongated in Schizmohetera but not in Fagina, and the millipedes in Fagina are smaller, with males measuring only 8 mm in length and females measuring only 9 mm in length.

== Species ==
This genus contains the following three species:

- Schizmohetera curcici Makarov, 2001
- Schizmohetera olympica Mauriès, 2003
- Schizmohetera sketi Mršić, 1987
