= Biokoviella =

Scientific classification
- Domain: Eukaryota
- Kingdom: Animalia
- Phylum: Arthropoda
- Subphylum: Myriapoda
- Class: Diplopoda
- Order: Chordeumatida
- Family: Anthogonidae
- Subfamily: Biokoviellinae
- Genus: Biokoviella; Mršić, 1992

Genus of millipedes

Biokoviella is a genus of millipedes belonging to family Anthogonidae in order Chordeumatida. Adult millipedes have 30 segments (counting the collum as the first segment and the telson as the last).

== Species ==
The genus contains two recognised species:

- Biokoviella mauriesi Mršić, 1992
- Biokoviella mosorensis Antić & Dražina, 2016

The genus was formerly assigned to the monotypic family Biokoviellidae, but is now treated as a monotypic subfamily in family Anthogonidae.
