= Faginidae =

Scientific classification
- Domain: Eukaryota
- Kingdom: Animalia
- Phylum: Arthropoda
- Subphylum: Myriapoda
- Class: Diplopoda
- Order: Chordeumatida
- Superfamily: Neoatractosomatoidea
- Family: Faginidae

Family of millipedes

Faginidae was a family of millipedes belonging to the order Chordeumatida. The Austrian myriadpodologist Carl Attems proposed this family in 1926 to contain the genus Fagina. Adult millipedes in this genus have only 28 segments (counting the collum as the first segment and the telson as the last), not the 30 segments usually found in this order.

In 2003, the French myriapodologist Jean-Paul Mauriès deemed Faginidae to be a junior synonym of Neoatractosomatidae. Authorities no longer accept Faginidae as a valid family. Authorities now place the monotypic genus Fagina in the family Neoatractosomatidae instead.

Genera:

- Fagina Attems, 1904
