= Origmatogonidae =

Scientific classification
- Domain: Eukaryota
- Kingdom: Animalia
- Phylum: Arthropoda
- Subphylum: Myriapoda
- Class: Diplopoda
- Order: Chordeumatida
- Superfamily: Anthroleucosomatoidea
- Family: Origmatogonidae

Family of millipedes

Origmatogonidae is a family of millipedes belonging to the order Chordeumatida. This family has been folded into the family Chamaesomatidae.

Genera:

- Alavasoma Mauriès & Vicente, 1977
- Origmatogona Ribaut, 1913
- Vascosoma Mauriès, 1966
