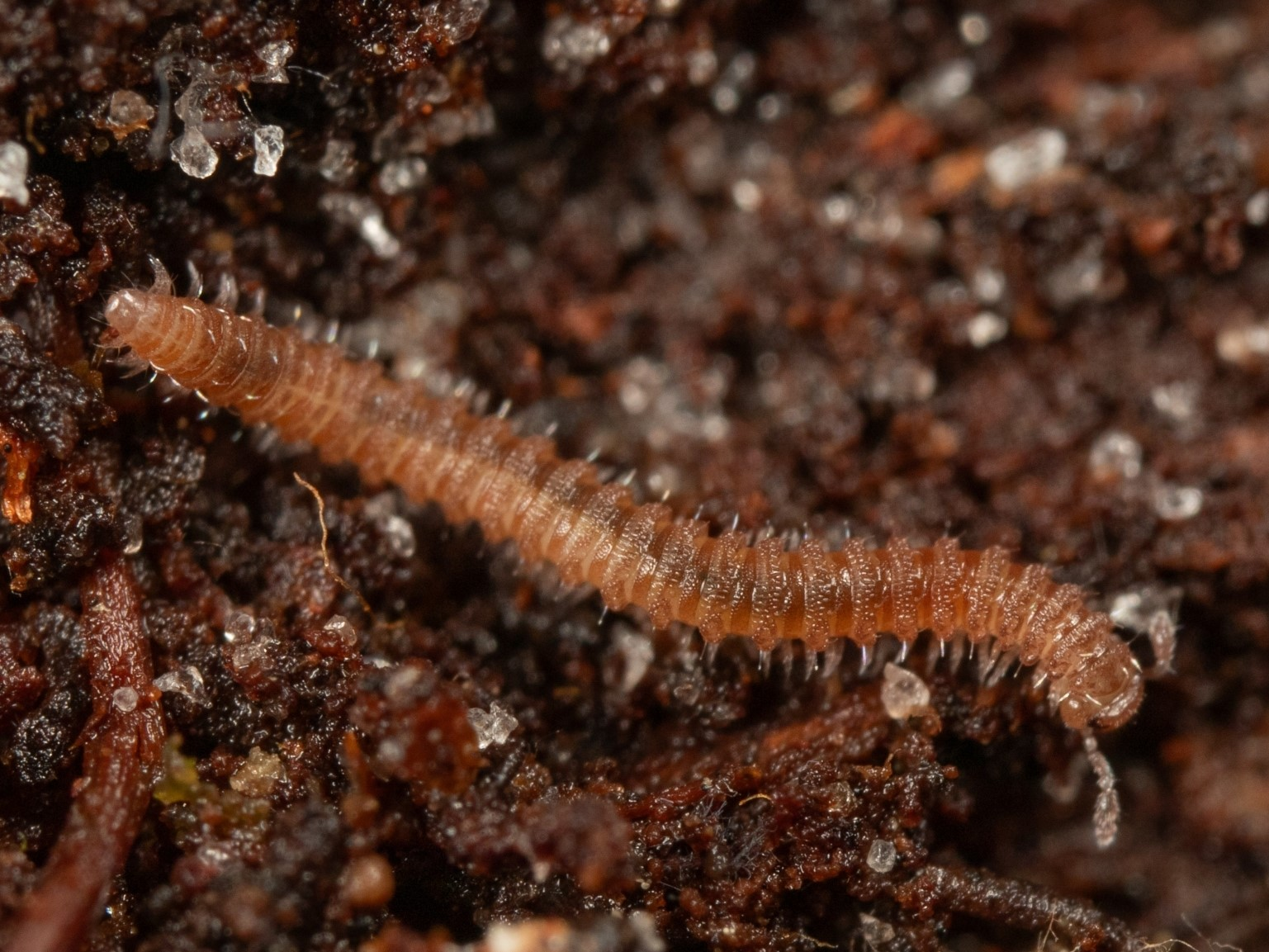
- Branneria carinata

Scientific classification
- Kingdom: Animalia
- Phylum: Arthropoda
- Subphylum: Myriapoda
- Class: Diplopoda
- Order: Chordeumatida
- Suborder: Craspedosomatidea
- Superfamily: Brannerioidea
- Family: Branneriidae; Cook, 1896
- Genus: Branneria; Bollman, 1893

Species
- Branneria bonoculus Shear, 2003; Branneria carinata (Bollman, 1888)

= Branneria =

Genus of millipedes

Branneria is a genus of small millipedes in the order Chordeumatida and the only genus in the family Branneriidae. Individuals reach about 4 mm (0.16 in) long. There are two species known, found in the southeastern USA: Branneria bonoculus is found in Arkansas and eastern Texas while B. carinata occurs from North Carolina to Florida and Mississippi. The adult B. bonoculus millipede has 28 body segments (including the telson), and the adult B. carinata millipede has 26, both fewer than the 30 usually found in the order Chordeumatida. In both species, the gonopod complex in adult males includes three leg pairs (pairs 8 through 10) rather than just the two (pairs 8 and 9) that are usually modified into gonopods in this order.
