= Speophilosomatidae =

Scientific classification
- Domain: Eukaryota
- Kingdom: Animalia
- Phylum: Arthropoda
- Subphylum: Myriapoda
- Class: Diplopoda
- Order: Chordeumatida
- Superfamily: Chordeumatoidea
- Family: Speophilosomatidae

Family of millipedes

Speophilosomatidae is a family of millipedes belonging to the order Chordeumatida. These millipedes are found in Japan and range from 4 mm to 6 mm in length. Adult millipedes in this family are notable for being among the few in this order with only 26 segments (counting the collum, the telson, and the segments in between) instead of the 30 usually found in chordeumatidans. The adult males in this family are also notable for involving three leg pairs (pairs 7 through 9) in the gonopod complex rather than the two pairs (pairs 8 and 9) typically modified into gonopods in this order.

Genera:

- Speophilosoma Takakuwa, 1949
