= Niponiosomatidae =

Scientific classification
- Domain: Eukaryota
- Kingdom: Animalia
- Phylum: Arthropoda
- Subphylum: Myriapoda
- Class: Diplopoda
- Order: Chordeumatida
- Superfamily: Brannerioidea
- Family: Niponiosomatidae

Family of millipedes

Niponiosomatidae is a family of millipedes belonging to the order Chordeumatida. Adult millipedes in this family have 28 or 30 segments (counting the collum as the first segment and the telson as the last).

Genera:

- Niponiosoma Verhoeff, 1941
- Taiwaneuma Mikhaljova, Golovatch & Chang, 2011
