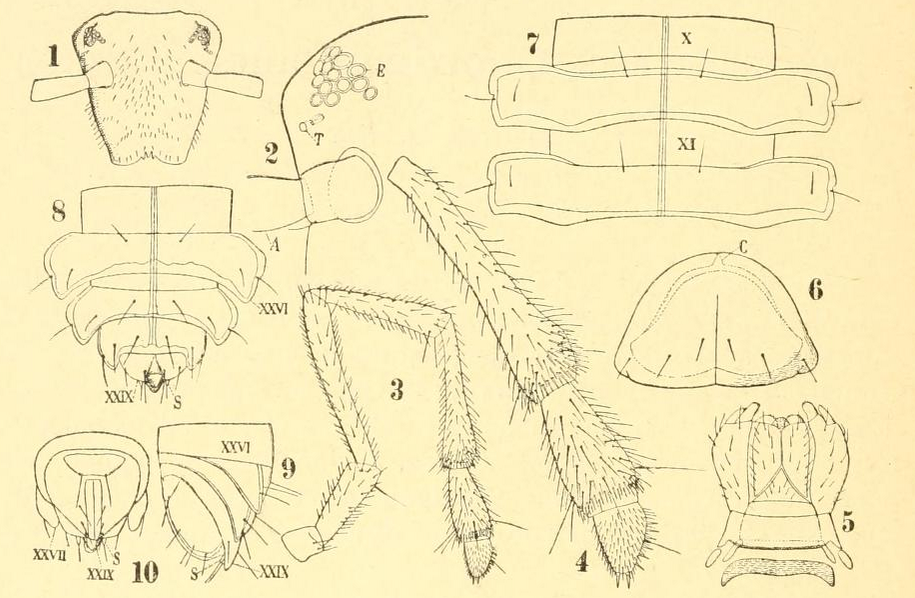
- Anatomical illustrations of U. bumpusi

Scientific classification
- Kingdom: Animalia
- Phylum: Arthropoda
- Subphylum: Myriapoda
- Class: Diplopoda
- Order: Chordeumatida
- Suborder: Striariidea
- Superfamily: Striarioidea
- Family: Urochordeumatidae; Silvestri, 1909
- Genus: Urochordeuma; Silvestri, 1909

Species
- Urochordeuma bumpusi Silvestri, 1909; Urochordeuma porona Chamberlin, 1941

= Urochordeuma =

Genus of millipedes

Urochordeuma is a genus of millipedes in the order Chordeumatida and the only genus in the family Urochordeumatidae. Adult millipedes in this family have 30 segments (counting the collum as the first segment and the telson as the last). The two species are known from the U.S. state of Washington, where U. bumpusi is known from Pierce County, and U. porona from King County.
