= Anthogonidae =

Scientific classification
- Kingdom: Animalia
- Phylum: Arthropoda
- Subphylum: Myriapoda
- Class: Diplopoda
- Order: Chordeumatida
- Superfamily: Anthroleucosomatoidea
- Family: Anthogonidae; Ribaut, 1913

Diversity
- 7 genera, >29 species

Family of millipedes

Anthogonidae is a family of millipedes in the order Chordeumatida.This family includes more than 29 species distributed among 7 genera. This family is present on Iberian Peninsula, Sardinia and Western Balkans.

== Systematics ==
Genera include:

- Anthogona Ribaut, 1913
- Cranogona Ribaut, 1913
- Egonpretneria Strasser, 1966
- Escualdosoma Mauriès, 1965
- Haasia Bollman, 1893
- Macrochaetosoma Absolon & Lang, 1933
- Vascanthogona Mauriès & Barraqueta, 1985
