= Pygmaeosomatidae =

Scientific classification
- Domain: Eukaryota
- Kingdom: Animalia
- Phylum: Arthropoda
- Subphylum: Myriapoda
- Class: Diplopoda
- Order: Chordeumatida
- Superfamily: Pygmaeosomatoidea
- Family: Pygmaeosomatidae

Family of millipedes

Pygmaeosomatidae is a family of millipedes belonging to the order Chordeumatida. Adult millipedes in this family have 30 or 32 segments (counting the collum as the first segment and the telson as the last).

Genera:

- Betscheuma Mauriès, 1994
- Hendersonula Pocock, 1903
- Pygmaeosoma Carl, 1941
