= Tingupidae =

Scientific classification
- Kingdom: Animalia
- Phylum: Arthropoda
- Subphylum: Myriapoda
- Class: Diplopoda
- Order: Chordeumatida
- Superfamily: Brannerioidea
- Family: Tingupidae; Loomis, 1966

Family of millipedes

Tingupidae is a family of millipedes in the order Chordeumatida. Adult millipedes in this family have 28 or 30 segments (counting the collum as the first segment and the telson as the last). There are 2 genera and 13 described species in Tingupidae.

== Genera ==
- Blancosoma Shear & Hubbard, 1998
- Tingupa Chamberlin, 1910
