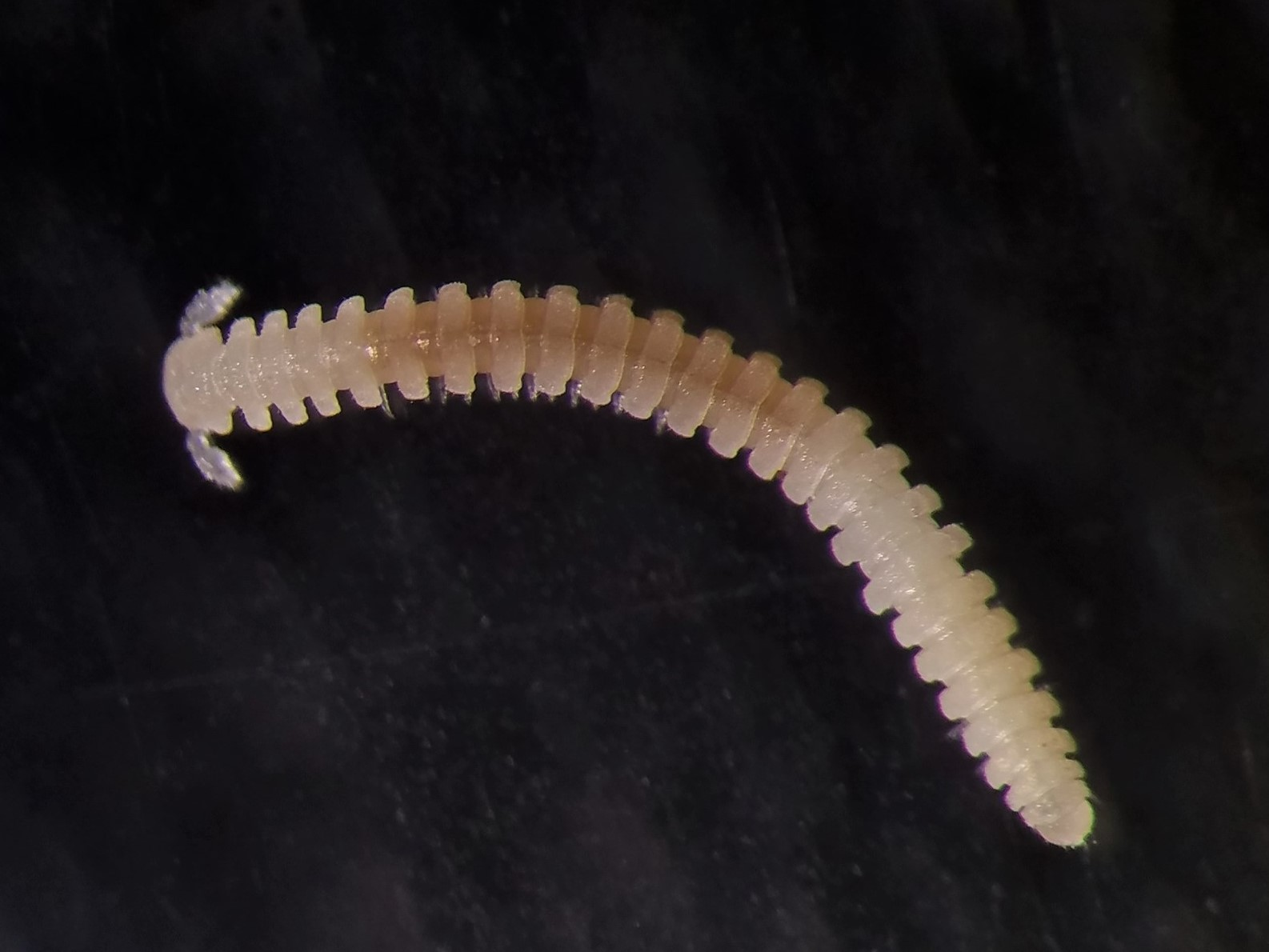

Scientific classification
- Kingdom: Animalia
- Phylum: Arthropoda
- Subphylum: Myriapoda
- Class: Diplopoda
- Order: Chordeumatida
- Family: Buotidae; Shear, 2009
- Genus: Buotus; Chamberlin, 1940
- Species: B. carolinus

Binomial name
- Buotus carolinus Chamberlin, 1940

= Buotus =

Buotus carolinus

Family of millipedes

Buotus is a genus of millipedes in the order Chordeumatida. It is the only genus in the family Buotidae and also is itself monotypic, being represented by the single species, Buotus carolinus.

== Description ==
Buotus carolinus exhibits sexual dimorphism in its segment number: the adult female has 28 segments, but the adult male has only 26, both fewer than the 30 usually found in this order (counting the collum as the first segment and the telson as the last). These millipedes are very small (no more than 4 mm in length) and have been found in the mountains of Virginia, West Virginia, and North Carolina.
