= Platydesmidae =

Scientific classification
- Kingdom: Animalia
- Phylum: Arthropoda
- Subphylum: Myriapoda
- Class: Diplopoda
- Order: Platydesmida
- Family: Platydesmidae

Family of millipedes

Platydesmidae is a family of millipede in the order Platydesmida. There are at least 2 genera and more than 30 described species in Platydesmidae.

== Genera ==
These two genera belong to the family Platydesmidae:

- Desmethus Chamberlin, 1922
- Platydesmus Lucas, 1843
