= Apterouridae =

Scientific classification
- Kingdom: Animalia
- Phylum: Arthropoda
- Subphylum: Myriapoda
- Class: Diplopoda
- Order: Chordeumatida
- Superfamily: Striarioidea
- Family: Apterouridae; Loomis, 1966

Family of millipedes

Apterouridae is a family of millipedes belonging to the order Chordeumatida. Adult millipedes in this family have 30 segments (counting the collum as the first segment and the telson as the last).

Genera:

- Apterourus Loomis, 1966
