= Macrochaeteumatidae =

Scientific classification
- Domain: Eukaryota
- Kingdom: Animalia
- Phylum: Arthropoda
- Subphylum: Myriapoda
- Class: Diplopoda
- Order: Chordeumatida
- Superfamily: Brannerioidea
- Family: Macrochaeteumatidae

Family of millipedes

Macrochaeteumatidae is a family of millipedes belonging to the order Chordeumatida. Adult millipedes in this family have only 28 segments (counting the collum as the first segment and the telson as the last) rather than the 30 segments usually found in this order.

Genera:

- Antroremya
- Calochaeteuma Miyosi, 1958
- Macrochaeteuma Verhoeff, 1914
