= Heterochordeumatidae =

Scientific classification
- Domain: Eukaryota
- Kingdom: Animalia
- Phylum: Arthropoda
- Subphylum: Myriapoda
- Class: Diplopoda
- Order: Chordeumatida
- Suborder: Heterochordeumatidea
- Family: Heterochordeumatidae

Family of millipedes

Heterochordeumatidae is a family of millipedes belonging to the order Chordeumatida. Adult millipedes in this family have 30 or 32 segments (counting the collum as the first segment and the telson as the last).

Genera:

- Heterochordeuma Pocock, 1893
- Infulathrix Shear, 2000
- Pyrgeuma Shear, 2013
- Sumatreuma Hoffman, 1963
