= Haplobainosomatidae =

Scientific classification
- Domain: Eukaryota
- Kingdom: Animalia
- Phylum: Arthropoda
- Subphylum: Myriapoda
- Class: Diplopoda
- Order: Chordeumatida
- Superfamily: Craspedosomatoidea
- Family: Haplobainosomatidae

Family of millipedes

Haplobainosomatidae is a family of millipedes belonging to the order Chordeumatida. Adult millipedes in this family have 30 segments (counting the collum as the first segment and the telson as the last).

Genera:

- Aragosoma Mauries, 1970
- Cantabrosoma Mauriès, 1970
- Galicisoma Mauriès, 2014
- Guadarramasoma Gilgado, Ledesma, Enghoff & Mauriès, 2017
- Haplobainosoma Verhoeff, 1899
- Pyreneosoma Mauriès, 1959
- Turdulisoma Mauriès, 1964
