= Golovatchiidae =

Scientific classification
- Domain: Eukaryota
- Kingdom: Animalia
- Phylum: Arthropoda
- Subphylum: Myriapoda
- Class: Diplopoda
- Order: Chordeumatida
- Superfamily: Brannerioidea
- Family: Golovatchiidae

Family of millipedes

Golovatchiidae is a family of millipedes belonging to the order Chordeumatida. This family contains a single species, Golovatchia magda. This species ranges from 15 mm to 17 mm in length and is found in the Russian Far East. Adult millipedes of this species have 30 segments (including the collum, the telson, and the rings in between). In the adult male of this species, the gonopod complex involves three leg pairs (pairs 8 through 10) rather than just the two (pairs 8 and 9) that are usually modified into gonopods this order.

Genera:

- Golovatchia Shear, 1992
