= Haasiidae =

Scientific classification
- Domain: Eukaryota
- Kingdom: Animalia
- Phylum: Arthropoda
- Subphylum: Myriapoda
- Class: Diplopoda
- Order: Chordeumatida
- Superfamily: Anthroleucosomatoidea
- Family: Haasiidae

Family of millipedes

Haasiidae is a family of millipedes belonging to the order Chordeumatida.

Genera:

- Acherosoma
- Likasoma Strasser, 1966
- Macrotelosoma Strasser, 1935
- Olotyphlops
