= Hoffmaneumatidae =

Scientific classification
- Domain: Eukaryota
- Kingdom: Animalia
- Phylum: Arthropoda
- Subphylum: Myriapoda
- Class: Diplopoda
- Order: Chordeumatida
- Superfamily: Neoatractosomatoidea
- Family: Hoffmaneumatidae

Family of millipedes

Hoffmaneumatidae is a family of millipedes belonging to the order Chordeumatida. This family includes two genera, one (Hoffmaneuma) found in the Russian Far East and the other (Japanoparvus) found in Japan. Millipedes in this family range from 4 mm to 6 mm in length. Adult millipedes in this family have only 28 segments (counting the collum as the first segment and the telson as the last), not the 30 segments usually found in this order. Adult males in this family feature a reduced leg pair 10 in addition to the two pairs (pairs 8 and 9) normally modified into gonopods in this order. In the adult male of the species Hoffmaneuma exiguum, for example, the gonopod complex derives from all three leg pairs rather than from just the usual two.

Genera:

- Hoffmaneuma Golovatch, 1978
- Japanoparvus Shear, Tanabe & Tsurusaki, 1997
