= Haplogona =

Scientific classification
- Kingdom: Animalia
- Phylum: Arthropoda
- Subphylum: Myriapoda
- Class: Diplopoda
- Order: Chordeumatida
- Suborder: Craspedosomatidea
- Superfamily: Verhoeffioidea; Verhoeff, 1899
- Family: Verhoeffiidae; Verhoeff, 1899
- Genus: Haplogona; Cook, 1895

Species
- Haplogona carinthiaca; Haplogona gestroi; Haplogona oculodistincta; Haplogona rothenbuehleri

Synonyms
- Verhoeffia

Genus of millipedes

Haplogona is a genus of chordeumatidan millipedes and the only genus in the family Verhoeffiidae. Adult millipedes in this family have 30 segments (counting the collum as the first segment and the telson as the last). These species occur in the southern Alps of Europe, from Genoa, Italy to the Istrian peninsula.
