= Attemsiidae =

Scientific classification
- Domain: Eukaryota
- Kingdom: Animalia
- Phylum: Arthropoda
- Subphylum: Myriapoda
- Class: Diplopoda
- Order: Chordeumatida
- Superfamily: Craspedosomatoidea
- Family: Attemsiidae

Synonyms
- Rhiscosomidae

Family of millipedes

Attemsiidae is a Palaearctic family of millipedes belonging to the order Chordeumatida. Adult millipedes in this family have 30 segments (counting the collum as the first segment and the telson as the last).

== Genera ==
The following are included in BioLib.cz:

1. Allorhiscosoma Verhoeff, 1907
2. Attemsia Verhoeff, 1895
3. Coelogonium Strasser, 1937
4. Dendromonomeron Verhoeff, 1912
5. Dimastosternum Attems, 1927
6. Elaphoischion Verhoeff, 1931
7. Elaphomerion Verhoeff, 1931
8. Eurygonium Strasser, 1937
9. Glomogonium Strasser, 1965
10. Grassografia Mrsic, 1987
11. Julialpium Strasser, 1937
12. Mecogonopodium Strasser, 1933
13. Polyphematia Verhoeff, 1912
14. Rhiscosoma Latzel, 1884
15. Schubartia Verhoeff, 1927
16. Stiphrogonium Strasser, 1937
17. Symphyosphys Strasser, 1939
18. Syngonopodium Verhoeff, 1913
19. Tylogonium Strasser, 1937
