= Kirkayakidae =

Scientific classification
- Domain: Eukaryota
- Kingdom: Animalia
- Phylum: Arthropoda
- Subphylum: Myriapoda
- Class: Diplopoda
- Order: Chordeumatida
- Superfamily: Neoatractosomatoidea
- Family: Kirkayakidae

Synonyms
- Altajellidae

Family of millipedes

Kirkayakidae is a family of millipedes belonging to the order Chordeumatida. This family was formerly known as Altajellidae. Adult millipedes in this family have 28 segments (counting the collum as the first segment and the telson as the last) rather than the 30 segments usually found in chordeumatidans.

== Taxonomy ==
The family contains the following four genera:

- Elongeuma Golovatch, 1982
- Kirkayakus Özdikmen, 2008
- Tarbagataya Golovatch & Wytwer, 2003
- Teleckophoron Gulička, 1972

This family was previously known as Altajellidae before genus Altajella was synonymised with Kirkayakus.
