= Peterjohnsiidae =

Scientific classification
- Domain: Eukaryota
- Kingdom: Animalia
- Phylum: Arthropoda
- Subphylum: Myriapoda
- Class: Diplopoda
- Order: Chordeumatida
- Superfamily: Heterochordeumatoidea
- Family: Peterjohnsiidae; Mauriès, 1987

Family of millipedes

Peterjohnsiidae is a small family of millipedes belonging to the order Chordeumatida. The family was first described in 1987 by Jean-Paul Mauriès. These millipedes range from 3 mm to 8 mm in length and are found in Australia. Species in this family exhibit sexual dimorphism in segment number: adult males have 30 segments, but adult females have 32 segments (counting the collum as the first segment and the telson as the last). In adult males in this family, the gonopod complex involves three leg pairs (pairs 8 through 10) rather than just the two (pairs 8 and 9) usually modified into gonopods in this order.

Genera:

- Peterjohnsia Mauriès, 1987
