= Eudigonidae =

Scientific classification
- Domain: Eukaryota
- Kingdom: Animalia
- Phylum: Arthropoda
- Subphylum: Myriapoda
- Class: Diplopoda
- Order: Chordeumatida
- Superfamily: Heterochordeumatoidea
- Family: Eudigonidae

Family of millipedes

Eudigonidae is a family of millipedes belonging to the order Chordeumatida. Adult millipedes in this family have 30 or 32 segments (counting the collum as the first segment and the telson as the last).

Genera:

- Ancudia Shear, 1988
- Eudigona Silvestri, 1903
