= Chordeumatidae =

Scientific classification
- Kingdom: Animalia
- Phylum: Arthropoda
- Subphylum: Myriapoda
- Class: Diplopoda
- Order: Chordeumatida
- Superfamily: Chordeumatoidea
- Family: Chordeumatidae

Family of millipedes

Chordeumatidae is a family of millipedes belonging to the order Chordeumatida. These millipedes range from 7 mm to 18 mm in length and are found in Europe. Adult millipedes in this family have either 28 (e.g., Melagona scutellaris) or 30 (e.g., M. gallica, Chordeuma proximum, and C. sylvestre) segments (counting the collum, the telson, and the segments in between). This family features distinctive sex-linked modifications to the legs in adults: In the adult female, a legless sternite (the "platosternite") replaces the third pair of legs, and in the adult male, five pairs of legs (pairs 7 through 11) are modified in the gonopod complex. These modifications are more extensive than those found in other adult males in this order, which often have only two leg pairs (pairs 8 and 9) modified into gonopods. With the more extensive modifications to the legs in this family, species with the usual 30 segments feature adult females with only 49 leg pairs and adult males with only 45 pairs of walking legs, and species with only 28 segments (e.g., M. scutellaris) feature adult females with only 45 leg pairs and adult males with only 41 pairs of walking legs.

Genera:

- Chordeuma Koch, 1847
- Chordeumella Verhoeff, 1897
- Ikseuma
- Laeviulus Berlese, 1884
- Lophomus Loomis & Schmitt, 1971
- Melogona Cook, 1895
- Microchordeuma Verhoeff, 1896
- Mycogona Cook, 1895
- Orthochordeuma
- Orthochordeumella Verhoeff, 1900
- Parachordeuma Ribaut, 1912
