= Diplomaragnidae =

Scientific classification
- Domain: Eukaryota
- Kingdom: Animalia
- Phylum: Arthropoda
- Subphylum: Myriapoda
- Class: Diplopoda
- Order: Chordeumatida
- Family: Diplomaragnidae

Family of myriapods

Diplomaragnidae is a family of millipedes belonging to the order Chordeumatida. These millipedes range from 9 mm to 24 mm in length and are found from the Volga River region in Russia to Japan and Taiwan. All known adult females in this family have 32 segments (counting the collum as the first segment and the telson as the last) rather than the 30 segments typically found in this order; in most species, adult males also have 32 segments (e.g., Altajosoma kemerovo), but in some species, adult males have only 30 segments (e.g., Diplomaragna reducta).

== Genera ==
Genera:

- Alineuma Mikhaljova, 2021
- Altajosoma Gulička, 1972
- Ancestreuma Golovatch, 1977
- Asiatyla Mikhaljova, 1999
- Diplomaragna Attems, 1907
- Koreagna Mikhaljova & Lim, 2008
- Litovkia Mikhaljova, 2021
- Maritimosoma Mikhaljova, 1999
- Niponiothauma Verhoeff, 1942
- Orientyla Mikhaljova, 1999
- Pacifiosoma Mikhaljova, 1999
- Pterygostegia Miyosi, 1958
- Sakhalineuma Golovatch, 1976
- Shearia Mikhaljova, 1999
- Syntelopodeuma Verhoeff, 1914
- Tokyosoma Verhoeff, 1929
