= Mastigophorophyllidae =

Scientific classification
- Domain: Eukaryota
- Kingdom: Animalia
- Phylum: Arthropoda
- Subphylum: Myriapoda
- Class: Diplopoda
- Order: Chordeumatida
- Superfamily: Neoatractosomatoidea
- Family: Mastigophorophyllidae

Family of millipedes

Mastigophorophyllidae is a family of millipedes belonging to the order Chordeumatida. Adult millipedes in this family have 30 segments (counting the collum as the first segment and the telson as the last).

== Genera ==
This family includes the following genera:

- Bucovinosoma Tabacaru, 1978
- Haploporatia Verhoeff, 1897
- Heterobraueria Verhoeff, 1897
- Karpatophyllon Jawłowski, 1928
- Mastigona Cook, 1895
- Mastigophorophyllon Verhoeff, 1897
- Paraporatia Ceuca, 1967
- Taurinosoma Verhoeff, 1932
- Tessinosoma Verhoeff, 1911
- Thaumaporatia Verhoeff, 1900
