= Brachychaeteumatidae =

Scientific classification
- Domain: Eukaryota
- Kingdom: Animalia
- Phylum: Arthropoda
- Subphylum: Myriapoda
- Class: Diplopoda
- Order: Chordeumatida
- Superfamily: Brannerioidea
- Family: Brachychaeteumatidae

Synonyms
- Brachychaeteumidae

Family of millipedes

Brachychaeteumatidae is a family of millipedes belonging to the order Chordeumatida. Adult millipedes in this family have 30 segments (counting the collum as the first segment and the telson as the last).

Genera:

- Brachychaeteuma Verhoeff, 1911
- Hungarosoma Verhoeff, 1928A
- Iacksoneuma
- Verhoeffeuma Strasser, 1937
