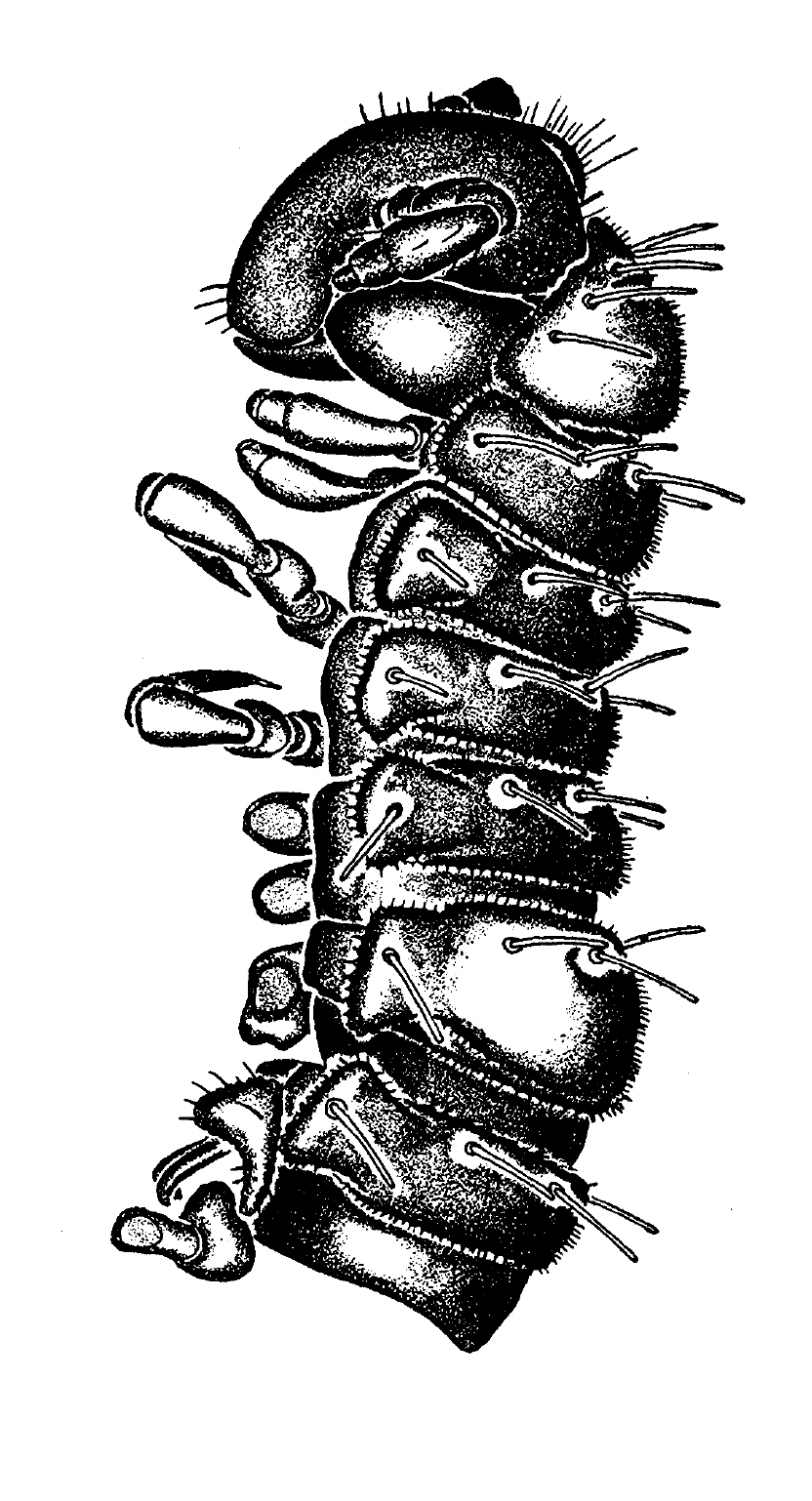
- Rhiscosomides josephi

Scientific classification
- Domain: Eukaryota
- Kingdom: Animalia
- Phylum: Arthropoda
- Subphylum: Myriapoda
- Class: Diplopoda
- Order: Chordeumatida
- Family: Rhiscosomididae
- Genus: Rhiscosomides; Silvestri, 1909

= Rhiscosomides =

Genus of millipedes

Rhiscosomides is a genus of small millipedes in the order Chordeumatida. The genus contains seven described species, and is the only genus in the family Rhiscosomididae.

Rhiscosomides millipedes are native to western North America. Adult millipedes in this family are small, and have 30 segments (counting the collum as the first segment and the telson as the last).

== Species ==
- Rhiscosomides acovescor Shear, 1972
- Rhiscosomides benedictae Shear, 1973
- Rhiscosomides josephi Chamberlin, 1941
- Rhiscosomides malcomi Shear, 1973
- Rhiscosomides meineri Silvestri, 1909
- Rhiscosomides montereum Chamberlin, 1910
- Rhiscosomides trinitarium Shear, 1973
