= Trachygonidae =

Scientific classification
- Domain: Eukaryota
- Kingdom: Animalia
- Phylum: Arthropoda
- Subphylum: Myriapoda
- Class: Diplopoda
- Order: Chordeumatida
- Superfamily: Brannerioidea
- Family: Trachygonidae

Family of millipedes

Trachygonidae is a family of millipedes belonging to the order Chordeumatida. Adult millipedes in this family have 28 or 30 segments (counting the collum as the first segment and the telson as the last).

Genera:

- Acrochordum Attems, 1899
- Gottscheeosoma Verhoeff, 1927
- Halleinosoma Verhoeff, 1913
- Heteracrochordum Loksa, 1960
- Trachygona Cook, 1895
- Trachysoma
