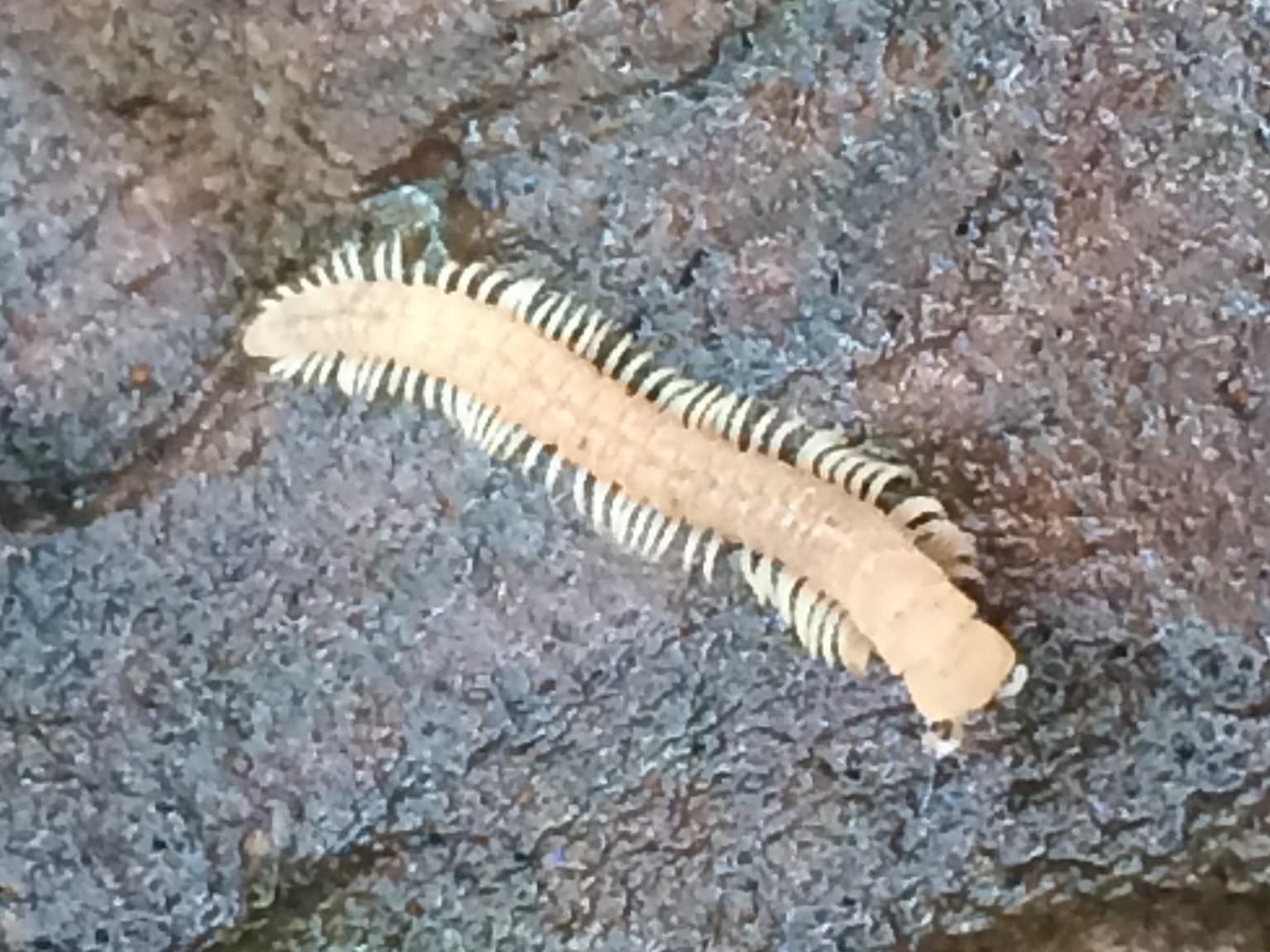
- Striaria nazinta

Scientific classification
- Kingdom: Animalia
- Phylum: Arthropoda
- Subphylum: Myriapoda
- Class: Diplopoda
- Order: Chordeumatida
- Superfamily: Striarioidea
- Family: Striariidae; Bollman, 1893

= Striariidae =

Family of millipedes

Striariidae is a family of millipedes in the order Chordeumatida. Adult millipedes in this family have 30 segments (counting the collum as the first segment and the telson as the last). There are at least 3 genera and about 13 described species in Striariidae.

== Genera ==
There are currently three recognized genera in the family Striariidae:

- Amplaria Chamberlin, 1941
- Striaria Bollman, 1888
- Vaferia Causey, 1958
