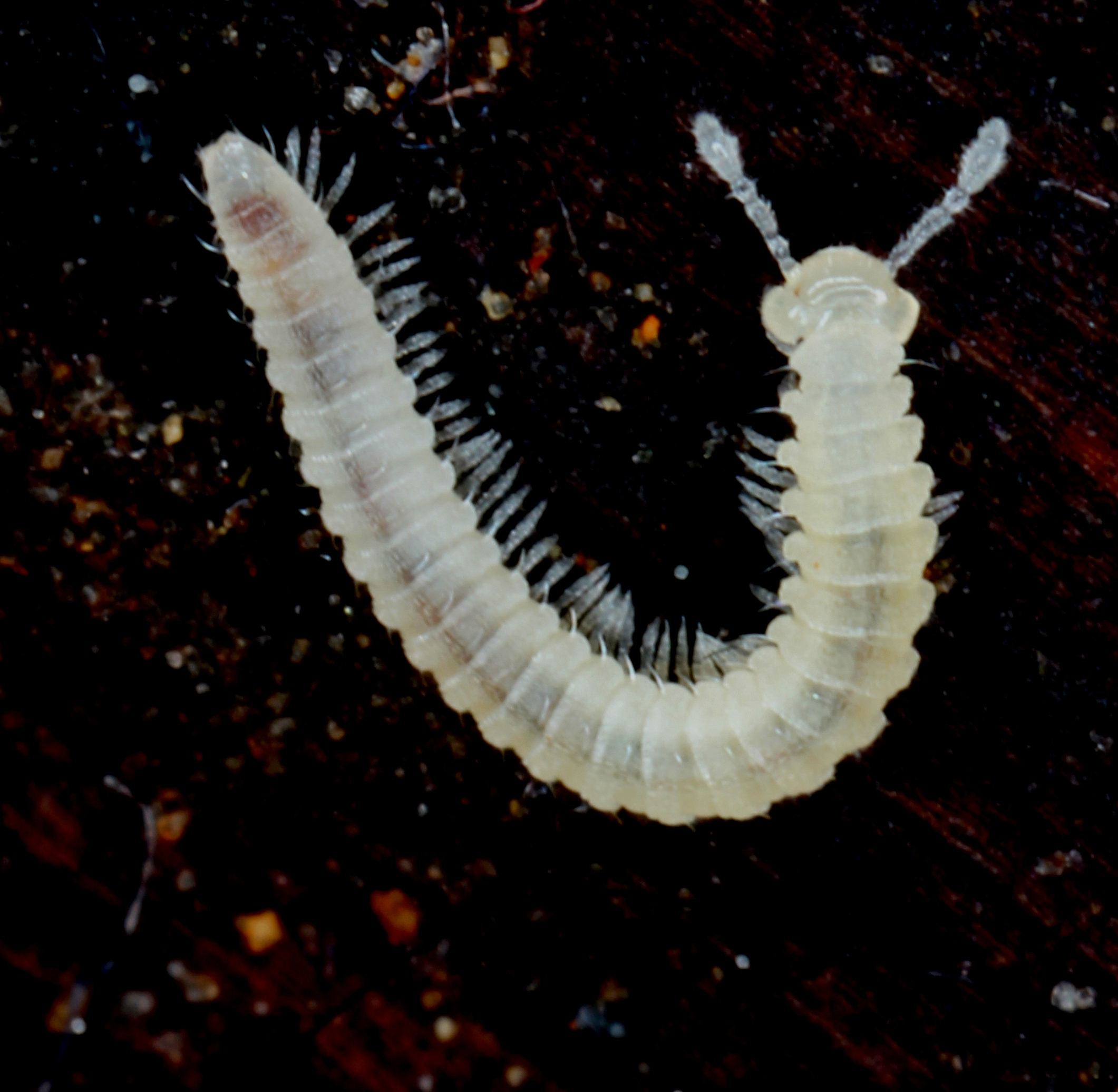
- Conotyla millipede, Oregon Caves National Monument

Scientific classification
- Domain: Eukaryota
- Kingdom: Animalia
- Phylum: Arthropoda
- Subphylum: Myriapoda
- Class: Diplopoda
- Order: Chordeumatida
- Superfamily: Conotyloidea
- Family: Conotylidae; Cook, 1896

= Conotylidae =

Family of millipedes

Conotylidae is a family of millipedes in the order Chordeumatida. Adult millipedes in this family have 30 segments (counting the collum as the first segment and the telson as the last). There are about 19 genera and at least 60 described species in Conotylidae.

== Genera ==
- Achemenides Shear, 1971
- Austrotyla Causey, 1961
- Bollmanella Chamberlin, 1941
- Brunsonia Loomis & Schmitt, 1971
- Conotyla Cook & Collins, 1895
- Cookella
- Corypus Loomis & Schmitt, 1971
- Crassotyla
- Endopus
- Idagona Buckett & Gardner, 1967
- Japanosoma
- Lophomus Loomis & Schmitt, 1971
- Macromastus Loomis & Schmitt, 1971
- Orthogmus
- Plumatyla Shear, 1972
- Taiyutyla Chamberlin, 1952
- Troglotyla
- Yasudatyla
- Zygotyla
