= Neoatractosomatidae =

Scientific classification
- Kingdom: Animalia
- Phylum: Arthropoda
- Subphylum: Myriapoda
- Class: Diplopoda
- Order: Chordeumatida
- Superfamily: Neoatractosomatoidea
- Family: Neoatractosomatidae

Family of millipedes

Neoatractosomatidae is a family of millipedes belonging to the order Chordeumatida. This family includes about two dozen species distributed among nine genera. These millipedes are found in southern central Europe and the Balkans.

== Description ==
Millipedes in this family range from 6 mm to 18 mm in length. These millipedes have 28 or 30 segments (counting the collum as the first segment and the telson as the last). The anterior gonopods in this family feature a pair of flagella or bunches of rods. The posterior gonopods feature no flagella, and the distal elements (telopodites) of these gonopods are reduced to erect stumps.

== Genera ==
This family includes the following nine genera:

- Epirosomella Strasser, 1976
- Fagina Attems, 1904
- Microbrachysoma Verhoeff, 1897
- Neoatractosoma Silvestri, 1898
- Osellasoma Mauriès, 1984
- Paeonisoma Verhoeff, 1932
- Pseudocraspedosoma Silvestri, 1898
- Schizmohetera Mršić, 1987
- Trimerophorella Verhoeff, 1902
