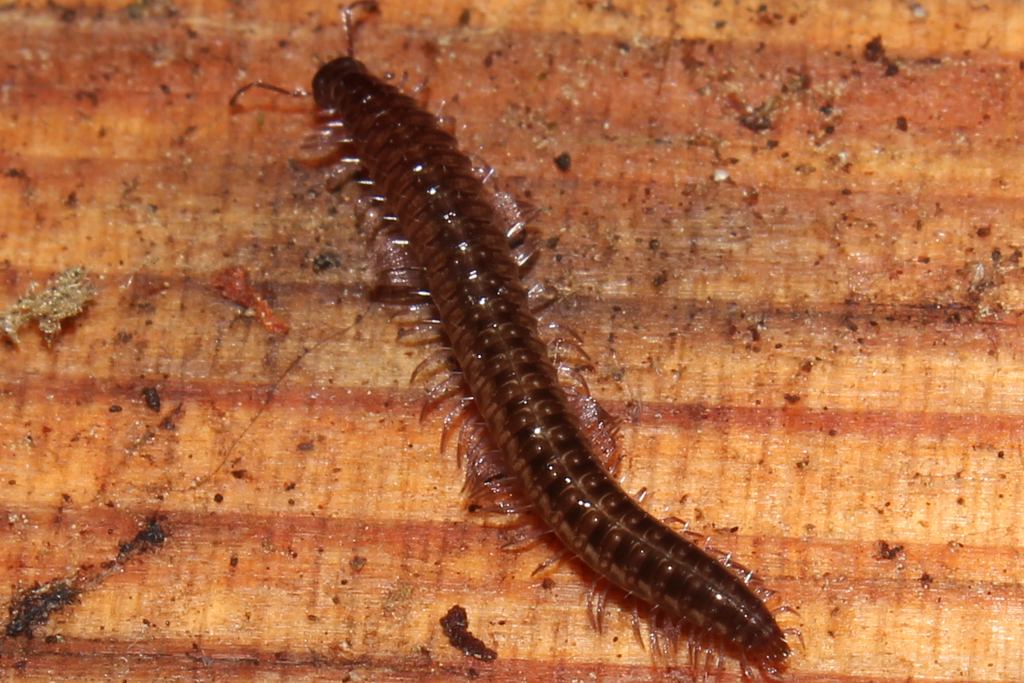
- Cleidogona, member species of Cleidogonidae

Scientific classification
- Domain: Eukaryota
- Kingdom: Animalia
- Phylum: Arthropoda
- Subphylum: Myriapoda
- Class: Diplopoda
- Order: Chordeumatida
- Superfamily: Cleidogonoidea
- Family: Cleidogonidae; Cook, 1896

= Cleidogonidae =

Family of millipedes

Cleidogonidae is a family of millipedes in the order Chordeumatida. Adult millipedes in this family have 28, 29, or 30 segments (counting the collum as the first segment and the telson as the last). This family includes the genus Tianella, notable for featuring adult millipedes with 29 segments, a number not found in the adults of any other chordeumatidan species. Adults in most Tianella species have 29 segments, but adults in two (T. daamsae and T. mananga) have only 28 segments. In the Tianella species with 29 segments, adult females have 48 pairs of legs, as one would expect in adult female chordeumatidans with one segment fewer than the 30 usually found in this order. There are seven genera and at least 140 described species in Cleidogonidae.

== Genera ==
- Cabraca Shear, 1982
- Cleidogona Cook, 1895
- Dybasia Loomis, 1964
- Pseudotremia Cope, 1869
- Solaenogona Hoffman, 1950
- Tianella Attems, 1904
- Tiganogona Chamberlin, 1928
