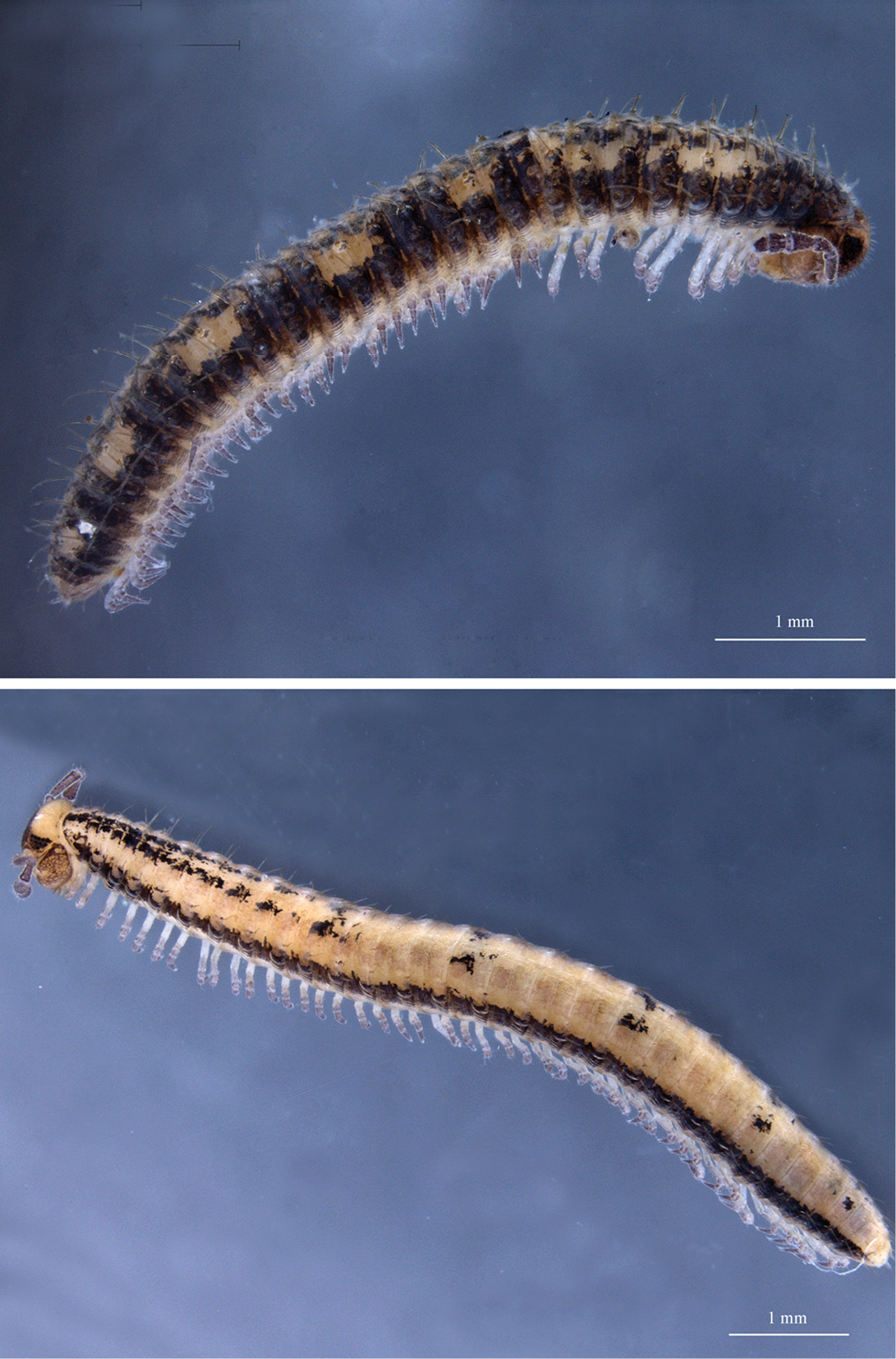
- Two unidentified species from New Zealand

Scientific classification
- Kingdom: Animalia
- Phylum: Arthropoda
- Subphylum: Myriapoda
- Class: Diplopoda
- Subterclass: Eugnatha
- Superorder: Nematophora
- Order: Chordeumatida; Pocock, 1894

Suborders
- Chordeumatidea; Craspedosomatidea; Heterochordeumatidea; Striariidea

Diversity
- c. 50 families, 1200 species

Synonyms
- Ascospermophora Verhoeff, 1900; Craspedosomatida Jeekel, 1971

= Chordeumatida =

Order of millipedes

Chordeumatida (from the Greek word for "sausage") is a large order of millipedes containing more than 1,100 species. Also known as sausage millipedes, they are found nearly worldwide. Chordeumatida is the largest order in the superorder Nematophora, a group also known as spinning millipedes because their telsons feature spinnerets used to build nests of silk. These millipedes produce this silk to create chambers in which to molt or to lay their eggs.

== Description ==
Chordeumatidans take on a wide variety of forms, including some that are cylindrical and others that are flat-backed. Most species have 26 to 32 body segments (including the telson) behind the head, with the number usually fixed within species. These millipedes range in length from 3.5 mm to 42 mm, although most species are 10 mm to 25 mm long. They are usually drab in color, ranging from various shades of brown to unpigmented, but some feature distinct patterns.

Species in this order share a set of features that distinguishes them from other millipedes. A key feature is the presence of six large bristles (setae) on the dorsal surface of each body segment, three on each side. The first segment (collum) is relatively narrow, giving the appearance of a distinct "neck" in many species, and the body tapers towards the rear. A dorsal groove runs down the length of the body, and some species feature paranota, lateral extensions of the exoskeleton. Paranota are also found in some other millipedes, notably Polydesmida, from which Chordeumatidans can be distinguished by having a dorsal groove. Unlike most other helminthomorph (worm-like) millipedes, chordeumatidans lack ozopores.

Most chordeumatidan species have 30 body segments (including the telson) as adults, and adult females in these species have 50 leg pairs. In adult males in this order, two leg pairs (pair 8 and pair 9) are modified into gonopods, leaving 48 pairs of walking legs in the typical adult male chordeumatidan. Many species in this order, however, deviate from this typical body plan.

Many chordeumatidan species deviate from the usual 30 segments: A few species have 26 segments as adults (e.g., Chamaesoma broelemanni and Xystrosoma santllorence), many species have 28 (e.g., Lipseuma josianae and Haasea hungarica), one genus features 29 (Tianella, in which most species have 29), one genus features 31 (Metamastigophorophyllon), and many species have 32 (e.g., Altajosoma kemerovo). Some species also deviate by featuring sexual dimorphism in segment number, specifically, adult males with two segments fewer than adult females, for example, in the family Buotidae (males with 26, females with 28), in Xystrosoma beatense (males with 28, females with the usual 30), and in the family Peterjohnsiidae (males with the usual 30, females with 32).

With these deviations from the usual 30 segments, the number of leg pairs in adults changes, usually with two leg pairs added or subtracted for each segment added to or subtracted from the typical number. For example, in Chamaesoma broelemanni, with only 26 segments (four fewer than the typical number), adult females have only 42 leg pairs, and adult males have only 40 pairs of walking legs (excluding two pairs of gonopods). Adult females with 32 segments (two more than the typical number) have 54 leg pairs (e.g., in the family Peterjohnsiidae), which is the maximum number fixed by species in the class Diplopoda.

Many species deviate from the expected number of walking legs, however, because they deviate in terms of sex-linked modifications to their legs. For example, many species involve another leg pair in addition to pairs 8 and 9 in the gonopod complex in adult males. In the family Speophilosomatidae, leg pair 7 in adult males is modified as part of the gonopod complex. In many species, the gonopod complex instead includes leg pair 10 in addition to pairs 8 and 9 (e.g., Branneria carinata, Neocambrisoma raveni, Golovatchia magda, and Hoffmaneuma exiguum). The family Chordeumatidae exhibits the most extensive modifications, including five leg pairs (pairs 7 through 11) in the gonopod complex. Some species also deviate from the usual body plan by reducing or eliminating leg pairs in the adult female. In the family Chordeumatidae, for example, adult females feature a legless sternite (the "platosternite") where a third pair of legs would otherwise be. In other species (e.g., the genus Kashmireuma and the species Vieteuma longi), adult females instead exhibit modifications to the second pair of legs, which are reduced to small nubbins.

== Development ==
Millipedes in this order grow and develop through a series of molts, adding segments until they reach a fixed number in the adult stage, which is usually the same for a given sex in a given species, at which point the molting and the addition of segments and legs stop. This mode of development, known as teloanamorphosis, distinguishes this order from most other orders of millipedes. In most other orders, millipedes continue to molt as adults, developing through either euanamorphosis or hemianamorphosis.

For the typical species in this order, post-embryonic development takes place in nine stages. The juvenile millipede hatches with 6 segments and only 3 pairs of legs in the first stage, then usually goes through stages with 8, 11, 15, 19, 23, 25, and 28 segments, before emerging as adults in the ninth and final stage with 30 segments. The male usually begins to develop gonopods in the seventh stage. Species that produce adults with fewer or more segments than the usual number, however, deviate from the typical pattern by adding a different number of segments at some stage, reaching maturity in a different stage, or both.

== Distribution ==
Chordeumatidans have a wide distribution, occurring on all continents except Antarctica. These millipedes are found in the tropics of Central America, Southeast Asia, and Oceania, and as far south as Tasmania, New Zealand, and Chiloé Island, Chile. Species in this order are present in Madagascar but absent from sub-Saharan Africa and, aside from southern Chile, are largely absent from South America. They are abundant in cold, rocky, mountainous areas of Europe and central Asia, and range northward to Scandinavia, Siberia, and in North America up into Canada and southwest Alaska.

== Classification ==
Chordeumatida contains more than 1,100 species, classified in four suborders and approximately 50 families, although several families contain only one to five genera.

Suborder Chordeumatidea Pocock 1894

- Superfamily Chordeumatoidea C. L. Koch, 1847
  - Chordeumatidae C. L. Koch, 1847
  - Speophilosomatidae Takakuwa, 1949

Suborder Craspedosomatidea Cook, 1895

- Superfamily Anthroleucosomatoidea Verhoeff 1899
  - Anthroleucosomatidae Verhoeff 1899
  - Haasiidae Hoffman, 1980
  - Origmatogonidae Verhoeff 1914
  - Vandeleumatidae Mauriès, 1970
- Superfamily Brannerioidea Cook, 1896
  - Brachychaeteumatidae Verhoeff, 1910
  - Branneriidae Cook, 1896
  - Chamaesomatidae Verhoeff, 1913
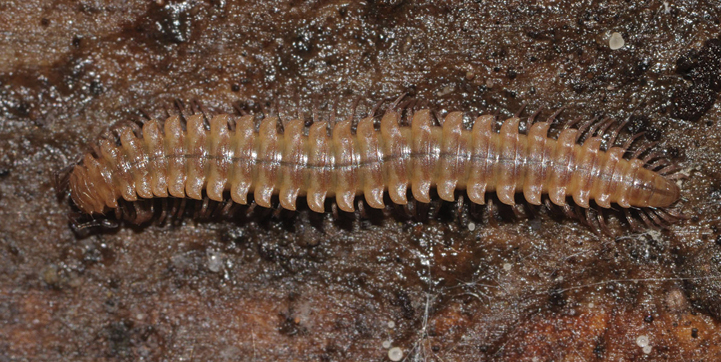
    Atractosoma (Craspedosomatidae) from Germany
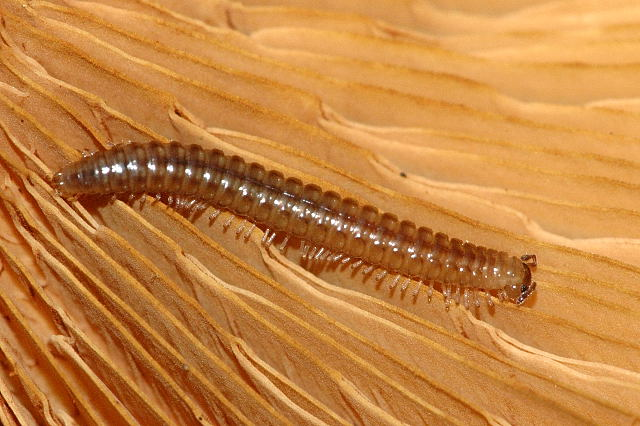
    Craspedosoma (Craspedosomatidae) from Belgium
  - Golovatchiidae Shear, 1992
  - Heterolatzeliidae Verhoeff 1899
  - Kashmireumatidae Mauriès, 1982
  - Macrochaeteumatidae Verhoeff, 1914
  - Microlympiidae Shear & Leonard, 2003
    monotypic: Microlympia Shear & Leonard, 2003
  - Niponiosomatidae Verhoeff, 1941
  - Tingupidae Loomis, 1966
  - Trachygonidae Cook, 1896
- Superfamily Cleidogonoidea Cook, 1896
  - Biokoviellidae Mrsic, 1992
  - Cleidogonidae Cook, 1896
  - Entomobielziidae Verhoeff, 1899
  - Lusitaniosomatidae Schubart, 1953
  - Opisthocheiridae Ribaut, 1913
  - Trichopetalidae Verhoeff, 1914
- Superfamily Craspedosomatoidea Gray in Jones, 1843
  - Attemsiidae Verhoeff, 1899
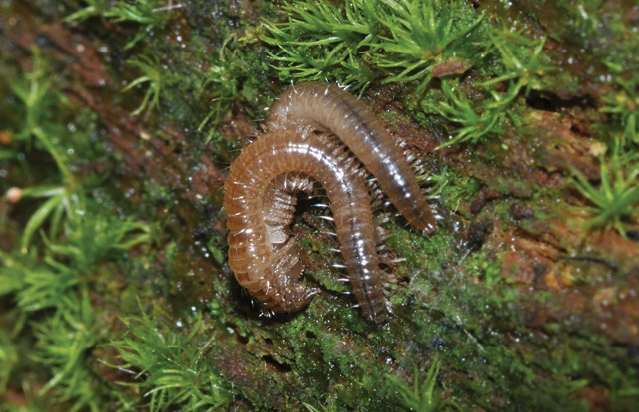
    A pair of Haasea (Haaseidae) from Germany. The dorsal groove is visible
  - Craspedosomatidae Gray in Jones, 1843
  - Haplobainosomatidae Verhoeff, 1909
- Superfamily Haaseoidea Attems, 1899
  - Haaseidae Attems, 1899
- Superfamily Neoatractosomatoidea Verhoeff, 1901
  - Altajellidae Mikhaljova & Golovatch, 2001
  - Cyrnosomatidae Mauriès, 2003
    monotypic: Cyrnosoma Mauriès, 1969
  - Faginidae Attems, 1926
  - Hoffmaneumatidae Golovatch, 1978
  - Mastigophorophyllidae Verhoeff, 1899
  - Neoatractosomatidae Verhoeff, 1901
- Superfamily Verhoeffioidea Verhoeff, 1899
  - Verhoeffiidae Verhoeff, 1899

Suborder Heterochordeumatidea Shear, 2000

- Superfamily Conotyloidea Cook, 1896
  - Adritylidae Shear, 1971
  - Conotylidae Cook, 1896
- Superfamily Diplomaragnoidea Attems, 1907
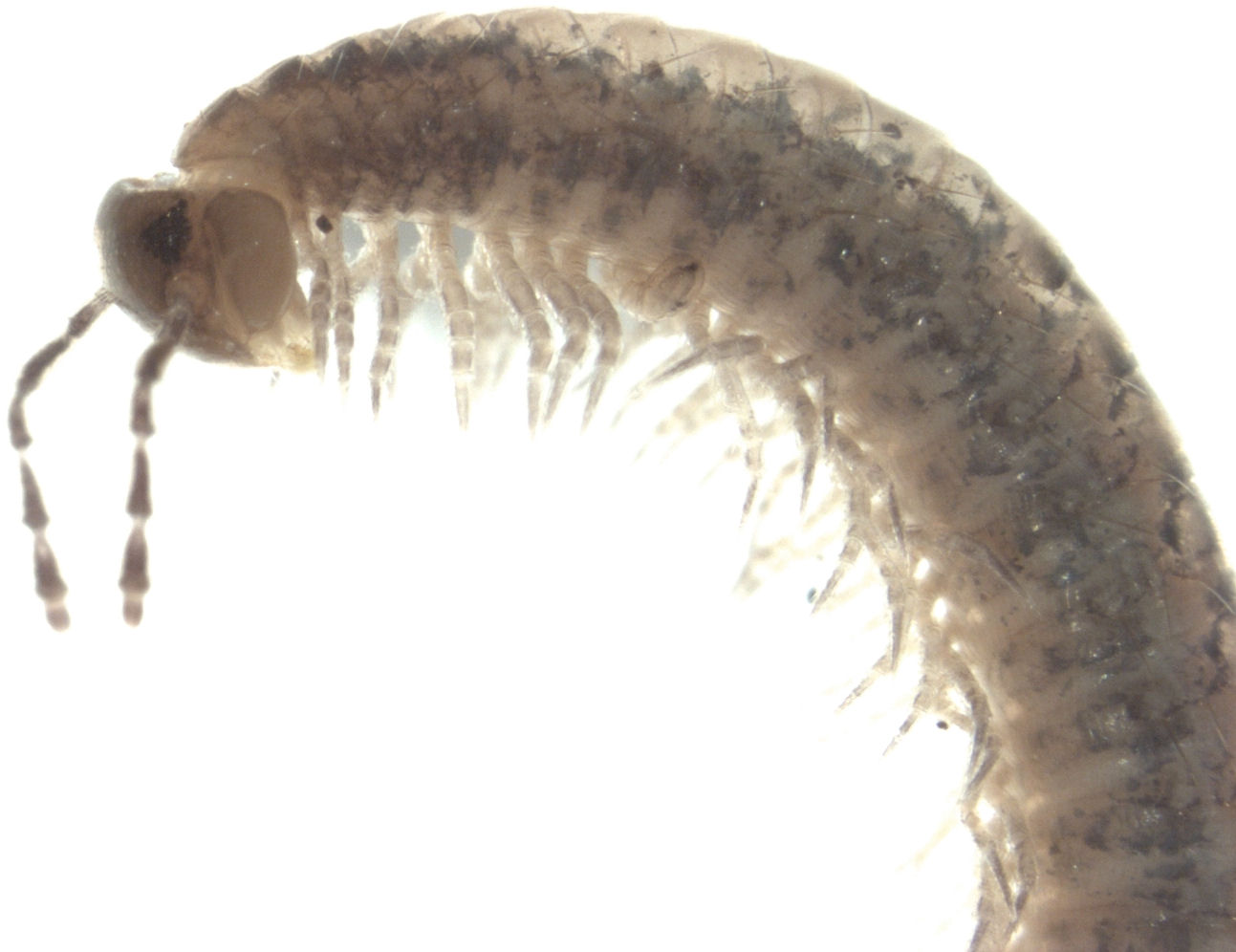
  Schedotrigona (Metopidiotrichidae) from New Zealand
  - Diplomaragnidae Attems, 1907
- Superfamily Heterochordeumatoidea Pocock, 1894
  - Eudigonidae Verhoeff, 1914
  - Heterochordeumatidae Pocock, 1894
  - Megalotylidae Golovatch, 1978
  - Metopidiotrichidae Attems, 1907
  - Peterjohnsiidae Mauriès, 1987
- Superfamily Pygmaeosomatoidea Carl, 1941
  - Lankasomatidae Mauriès 1978
  - Pygmaeosomatidae Carl, 1941

Suborder Striariidea Cook, 1896

- Superfamily Caseyoidea Verhoeff, 1909
  - Caseyidae Verhoeff, 1909
  - Urochordeumatidae Silvestri, 1909
- Superfamily Striarioidea Bollman, 1893
  - Apterouridae Loomis, 1966
  - Buotidae Shear, 2009
  - Rhiscosomididae Silvestri, 1909
  - Striariidae Bollman, 1893
