= List of animals by number of legs =

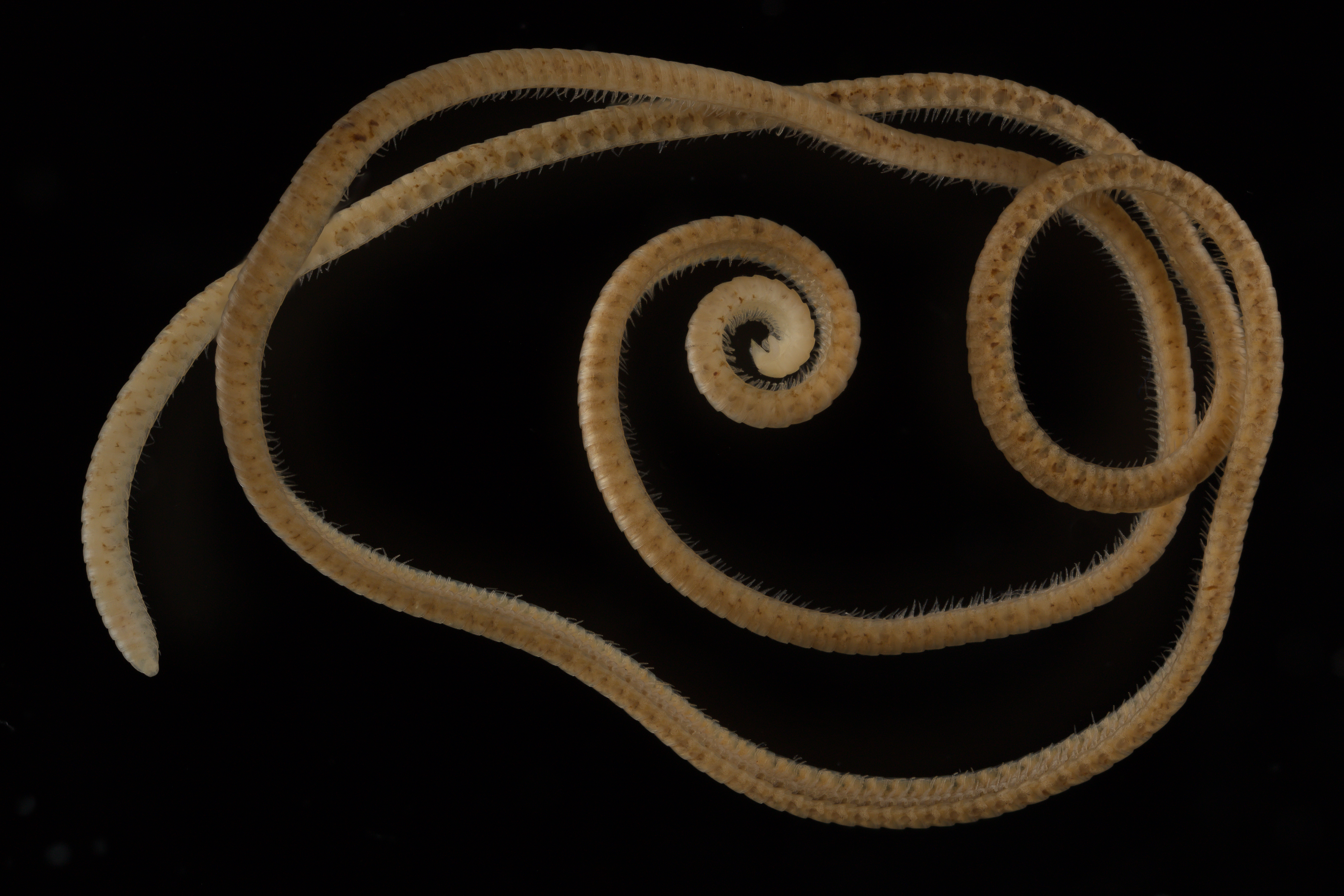
An adult female of the millipede species Eumillipes persephone with 653 leg pairs

The following is a list of selected animals in order of increasing number of legs, from 0 legs to 653 pairs of legs, the maximum recorded in the animal kingdom. Each entry provides the relevant taxa up to the rank of phylum. Each entry also provides the common name of the animal. If the relevant taxon includes different animals with different common names, then the entry provides the common name of a familiar example.

If juveniles have fewer legs than adults, then the animal is listed by the number of legs recorded in mature adults. If this number varies among adults within the taxon, then this variation is noted in a comment. In counting legs, this list follows conventions adopted in the relevant literature. For example, millipedes with gonopods are listed by numbers that exclude leg pairs that become gonopods, but numbers for millipedes with telopods include leg pairs modified as telopods.

Animals have been selected so that each number from 0 to 55 leg pairs has one example listed. Each of these examples is listed by a number closely associated with the relevant taxon, either because that number is the one most commonly observed in that taxon or because that number is one of only a few recorded for the taxon. Beyond 55 leg pairs, intraspecific variation in leg number increases, and the association between species and any particular number breaks down. Beyond 55 leg pairs, examples are listed only if they represent especially significant numbers (e.g., most legs in the animal kingdom) or exhibit relatively little intraspecific variation in leg number.

This list draws examples from three broad groups of animals: tetrapods (with 0 to 2 leg pairs, providing three examples), velvet worms (with 13 to 43 leg pairs, providing ten examples), and arthropods (adults with 3 to 653 leg pairs, providing all the other examples). Four classes of arthropods each provide multiple examples, including sea spiders (adults with 4 to 6 leg pairs, providing two examples) and pauropods (adults with 8 to 11 leg pairs, providing four examples), but most of the examples listed are either millipedes (adults with 11 to 653 leg pairs) or centipedes (adults with 15 to 191 leg pairs). Most of the millipede examples come from two orders, Polydesmida (flat-backed millipedes, providing four examples) and Chordeumatida (sausage millipedes, providing eight examples), each with some variation in leg number among species but little variation within species. Nearly all of the centipede examples come from only one order, Geophilomorpha (soil centipedes), which exhibits wide variation in leg number among species (from 27 to 191 leg pairs). Nearly all of the examples from the order Geophilomorpha come from three families of soil centipedes (Mecistocephalidae, Schendylidae, and Geophilidae) that exhibit relatively little intraspecific variation in leg number.

== List of animals by number of legs ==
Number of legs	Taxa	Common name	Comments	Image
0	Serpentes (suborder), Squamata (order), Reptilia (class), Tetrapoda (superclass), Vertebrata (subphylum), Chordata (phylum)	snake		
1 pair	Aves (class), Tetrapoda (superclass), Vertebrata (subphylum), Chordata (phylum)	bird		
2 pairs	Tetrapoda (superclass), Vertebrata (subpylum), Chordata (phylum)	mammal, for example	2 pairs in most species; some taxa have fewer	
3 pairs	Hexapoda (subphylum), Arthropoda (phylum)	insect, for example		
4 pairs	Arachnida (class), Chelicerata (subphylum), Arthropoda (phylum)	spider, for example		
5 pairs	Pentapycnon (genus), Pycnogonidae (family), Pantopoda (order), Pycnogonida (class), Chelicerata (subphylum), Arthropoda (phylum)	sea spider		
6 pairs	Sexanymphon mirabilis (monotypic genus & species), Nymphonidae (family), Pantopoda (order), Pycnogonida (class), Chelicerata (subphylum), Arthropoda (phylum)	sea spider		
7 pairs	Isopoda (order), Malacostraca (class), Crustacea (subphylum), Arthropoda (phylum)	woodlouse, for example	7 pairs in most species; some taxa have fewer	
8 pairs	Zygopauropus hesperius (monotypic genus & species), Brachypauropodidae (family), Tetramerocerata (order), Pauropoda (class), Myriapoda (subphylum), Arthropoda (phylum)	pauropod		
9 pairs	Tetramerocerata (order), Pauropoda (class), Myriapoda (subphylum), Arthropoda (phylum)	pauropod	9 pairs in most species; some taxa deviate from this number	
10 pairs	Decapauropus cuenoti (genus & type species), Pauropodidae (family), Tetramerocerata (order), Pauropoda (class), Myriapoda (subphylum), Arthropoda (phylum)	pauropod	9 or 10 pairs in females (usually 9); 9 pairs in males	
11 pairs	Millotauropus (genus), Millotauropodidae (monotypic family), Hexamerocerata (monotypic order), Pauropoda (class), Myriapoda (subphylum), Arthropoda (phylum)	pauropod		
12 pairs	Symphyla (class), Myriapoda (subphylum), Arthropoda (phylum)	symphylan	12 pairs in most species; some taxa have fewer	
13 pairs	Polyxenida (order), Diplopoda (class), Myriapoda (subphylum), Arthropoda (phylum)	bristly millipede	13 pairs in most species; some taxa deviate from this number	
14 pairs	Ooperipatellus viridimaculatus (genus & species), Peripatopsidae (family), Onychophora (phylum)	velvet worm		
15 pairs	Scutigeromorpha (order), Chilopoda (class), Myriapoda (subphylum), Arthropoda (phylum)	house centipede		
16 pairs	Peripatoides suteri (genus & species), Peripatopsidae (family), Onychophora (phylum)	velvet worm		
17 pairs	Glomerida (order), Diplopoda (class), Myriapoda (subphylum), Arthropoda (phylum)	northern pill millipede	17 pairs in females; 19 pairs in males (including 1 pair or 2 pairs of telopods)	
18 pairs	Peripatopsis alba (genus & species), Peripatopsidae (family), Onychophora (phylum)	velvet worm		
19 pairs	Typhloperipatus williamsoni (monotypic genus & species), Peripatidae (family), Onychophora (phylum)	velvet worm	minimum in family; 19 or 20 pairs in males (usually 19); 20 pairs in females	
20 pairs	Peripatopsis collarium (genus & species), Peripatopsidae (family), Onychophora (phylum)	velvet worm		
21 pairs	Sphaerotheriida (order), Diplopoda (class), Myriapoda (subphylum), Arthropoda (phylum)	giant pill millipede	21 pairs in females; 23 pairs in males (including 2 pairs of telopods)	
22 pairs	Metaperipatus inae (genus & species), Peripatopsidae (family), Onychophora (phylum)	velvet worm	22 pairs in females; 20 pairs in males	
23 pairs	Scolopocryptopidae (family), Scolopendromorpha (order), Chilopoda (class), Myriapoda (subphylum), Arthropoda (phylum)	bark centipede		
24 pairs	Eoperipatus totoro (genus & species), Peripatidae (family), Onychophora (phylum)	velvet worm	24 pairs in females; 23 pairs in males	
25 pairs	Eoperipatus horsti (genus & species), Peripatidae (family), Onychophora (phylum)	velvet worm	24 or 25 pairs in females; 23 or 24 pairs in males (usually 23)	
26 pairs	Agenodesmus reticulatus (genus & type species), Fuhrmannodesmidae (family), Polydesmida (order), Diplopoda (class), Myriapoda (subphylum), Arthropoda (phylum)	flat-backed millipede	26 pairs in males (excluding 1 pair of gonopods); 27 pairs in females	
27 pairs	Schendylops ramirezi (genus & species), Schendylidae (family), Geophilomorpha (order), Chilopoda (class), Myriapoda (subphylum), Arthropoda (phylum)	soil centipede	minimum in order; 27 pairs in males; 29 pairs in females	
28 pairs	Brachydesmus superus (genus & species), Polydesmidae (family), Polydesmida (order), Diplopoda (class), Myriapoda (subphylum), Arthropoda (phylum)	flat-backed millipede	28 pairs in males (excluding 1 pair of gonopods); 29 pairs in females	
29 pairs	Dinogeophilus oligopodus (genus & species), Schendylidae (family), Geophilomorpha (order), Chilopoda (class), Myriapoda (subphylum), Arthropoda (phylum)	soil centipede		
30 pairs	Polydesmida (order), Diplopoda (class), Myriapoda (subphylum), Arthropoda (phylum)	flat-backed millipede	usually 30 pairs in males (excluding 1 pair of gonopods); usually 31 pairs in females; some taxa deviate from these numbers	
31 pairs	Mesochendyla javanica (genus & species), Schendylidae (family), Geophilomorpha (order), Chilopoda (class), Myriapoda (subphylum), Arthropoda (phylum)	soil centipede	31 pairs in males; 31 or 33 pairs in females (usually 31)	
32 pairs	Devillea tuberculata (genus & type species), Xystodesmidae (family), Polydesmida (order), Diplopoda (class), Myriapoda (subphylum), Arthropoda (phylum)	flat-backed millipede	32 pairs in males (excluding 1 pair of gonopods); 35 pairs in females	
33 pairs	Geophilus hadesi (genus & species), Geophilidae (family), Geophilomorpha (order), Chilopoda (class), Myriapoda (subphylum), Arthropoda (phylum)	soil centipede		
34 pairs	Mongeperipatus solorzanoi (genus & species), Peripatidae (family), Onychophora (phylum)	velvet worm	34 pairs in males; 39 to 41 pairs in females (usually 41)	
35 pairs	Escaryus molodovae (genus & species), Schendylidae (family), Geophilomorpha (order), Chilopoda (class), Myriapoda (subphylum), Arthropoda (phylum)	soil centipede		
36 pairs	Glomeridesmida (order), Diplopoda (class), Myriapoda (subphylum), Arthropoda (phylum)	slug millipede	usually 36 pairs in females; usually 35 pairs in males (including 1 pair of telepods); some taxa deviate from these numbers	
37 pairs	Escaryus vitimicus (genus & species), Schendylidae (family), Geophilomorpha (order), Chilopoda (class), Myriapoda (subphylum), Arthropoda (phylum)	soil centipede		
38 pairs	Epiperipatus titanicus (genus & species), Peripatidae (family), Onychophora (phylum)	velvet worm	36 to 38 pairs in males; 36 to 39 pairs in females	
39 pairs	Escaryus polygonatus (genus & species), Schendylidae (family), Geophilomorpha (order), Chilopoda (class), Myriapoda (subphylum), Arthropoda (phylum)	soil centipede		
40 pairs	Chamaesoma broelemanni (monotypic genus & species), Chamaesomatidae (family), Chordeumatida (order), Diplopoda (class), Myriapoda (subphylum), Arthropoda (phylum)	sausage millipede	40 pairs in males (excluding 2 pairs of gonopods); 42 pairs in females	
41 pairs	Nannarrup (genus), Mecistocephalidae (family), Geophilomorpha (order), Chilopoda (class), Myriapoda (subphylum), Arthropoda (phylum)	soil centipede		
42 pairs	Xystrosoma santllorence (genus & species), Chamaesomatidae (family), Chordeumatida (order), Diplopoda (class), Myriapoda (subphylum), Arthropoda (phylum)	sausage millipede	42 pairs in females; 40 pairs in males (excluding 2 pairs of gonopods)	
43 pairs	Dicellophilus carniolensis (genus & species), Mecistocephalidae (family), Geophilomorpha (order), Chilopoda (class), Myriapoda (subphylum), Arthropoda (phylum)	soil centipede		
44 pairs	Haasea hungarica (genus & species), Haaseidae (family), Chordeumatida (order), Diplopoda (class), Myriapoda (subphylum), Arthropoda (phylum)	sausage millipede	44 pairs in males (excluding 2 pairs of gonopods); 46 pairs in females	
45 pairs	Dicellophilus limatus (genus & species), Mecistocephalidae (family), Geophilomorpha (order), Chilopoda (class), Myriapoda (subphylum), Arthropoda (phylum)	soil centipede		
46 pairs	Lipseuma (genus), Kashmireumatidae (family), Chordeumatida (order), Diplopoda (class), Myriapoda (subphylum), Arthropoda (phylum)	sausage millipede	46 pairs in females; 44 pairs in males (excluding 2 pairs of gonopods)	
47 pairs	Mecistocephalus tahitiensis (genus & species), Mecistocephalidae (family), Geophilomorpha (order), Chilopoda (class), Myriapoda (subphylum), Arthropoda (phylum)	soil centipede		
48 pairs	Tianella (genus), Entomobielziidae (family), Chordeumatida (order), Diplopoda (class), Myriapoda (subphylum), Arthropoda (phylum)	sausage millipede	usually 48 pairs in females; usually 46 pairs in males (excluding 2 pairs of gonopods); some species deviate from these numbers	
49 pairs	Mecistocephalus (genus), Mecistocephalidae (family), Geophilomorpha (order), Chilopoda (class), Myriapoda (subphylum), Arthropoda (phylum)	soil centipede	49 pairs in most species; some species deviate from this number	
50 pairs	Chordeumatida (order), Diplopoda (class), Myriapoda (subphylum), Arthropoda (phylum)	sausage millipede	usually 50 pairs in females; usually 48 pairs in males (excluding 2 pairs of gonopods); some taxa deviate from these numbers	
51 pairs	Mecistocephalus lifuensis (genus & species), Mecistocephalidae (family), Geophilomorpha (order), Chilopoda (class), Myriapoda (subphylum), Arthropoda (phylum)	soil centipede		
52 pairs	Metamastigophorophyllon (genus), Anthroleucosomatidae (family), Chordeumatida (order), Diplopoda (class), Myriapoda (subphylum), Arthropoda (phylum)	sausage millipede	52 pairs in females; 50 pairs in males (excluding 2 pairs of gonopods)	
53 pairs	Krateraspis sselivanovi (genus & species), Mecistocephalidae (family), Geophilomorpha (order), Chilopoda (class), Myriapoda (subphylum), Arthropoda (phylum)	soil centipede		
54 pairs	Neocambrisoma raveni (genus & type species), Metopidiotrichidae (family), Chordeumatida (order), Diplopoda (class), Myriapoda (subphylum), Arthropoda (phylum)	sausage millipede	maximum in class fixed by species; 54 pairs in females; 51 pairs in males (excluding 3 pairs modified as gonopods or paragonopods)	
55 pairs	Mesoschendyla cribrifera (genus & species), Schendylidae (family), Geophilomorpha (order), Chilopoda (class), Myriapoda (subphylum), Arthropoda (phylum)	soil centipede		
57 pairs	Mecistocephalus diversisternus (genus & species), Mecistocephalidae (family), Geophilomorpha (order), Chilopoda (class), Myriapoda (subphylum), Arthropoda (phylum)	soil centipede	57 or 59 pairs in each sex	
59 pairs	Mecistocephalus smithii (genus & species), Mecistocephalidae (family), Geophilomorpha (order), Chilopoda (class), Myriapoda (subphylum), Arthropoda (phylum)	soil centipede		
61 pairs	Mairata itatiaiensis (genus & species), Geophilidae (family), Geophilomorpha (order), Chilopoda (class), Myriapoda (subphylum), Arthropoda (phylum)	soil centipede	61 pairs in males; 63 pairs in females	
63 pairs	Mecistocephalus japonicus (genus & species), Mecistocephalidae (family), Geophilomorpha (order), Chilopoda (class), Myriapoda (subphylum), Arthropoda (phylum)	soil centipede	63 or 65 pairs in each sex	
65 pairs	Aphilodon bahianus (genus & species), Geophilidae (family), Geophilomorpha (order), Chilopoda (class), Myriapoda (subphylum), Arthropoda (phylum)	soil centipede	63 or 65 pairs in each sex	
67 pairs	Aphilodon silvestrii (genus & species), Geophilidae (family), Geophilomorpha (order), Chilopoda (class), Myriapoda (subphylum), Arthropoda (phylum)	soil centipede	67, 69, or 71 pairs in females; 69 pairs in males	
69 pairs	Schendylops demelloi (genus & species), Schendylidae (family), Geophilomorpha (order), Chilopoda (class), Myriapoda (subphylum), Arthropoda (phylum)	soil centipede	69 pairs in males; 69 or 71 pairs in females (usually 71)	
71 pairs	Geoperingueyia crabilli (genus & species), Geophilidae (family), Geophilomorpha (order), Chilopoda (class), Myriapoda (subphylum), Arthropoda (phylum)	soil centipede	71 pairs in males; 71, 73, or 75 pairs in females (usually 73)	
73 pairs	Aphilodon pereirai (genus & species), Geophilidae (family), Geophilomorpha (order), Chilopoda (class), Myriapoda (subphylum), Arthropoda (phylum)	soil centipede	73 or 75 pairs in males; 73, 75, or 77 pairs in females	
75 pairs	Stenotaenia asiaeminoris (genus & species), Geophilidae (family), Geophilomorpha (order), Chilopoda (class), Myriapoda (subphylum), Arthropoda (phylum)	soil centipede	75 pairs in males; 77 or 79 pairs in females	
191 pairs	Gonibregmatus plurimipes (genus & species), Gonibregmatidae (family), Geophilomorpha (order), Chilopoda (class), Myriapoda (subphylum), Arthropoda (phylum)	soil centipede	maximum in class; based on a single specimen	
355 pairs	Nematozonium filum (monotypic genus & species), Siphonorhinidae (family), Siphonophorida (order), Diplopoda (class), Myriapoda (subphylum), Arthropoda (phylum)	snout millipede	species with 5th most in kingdom; most specimens have fewer	
371 pairs	Siphonacme lyttoni & Siphonophora millepeda (genera & species), Siphonophoridae (family), Siphonophorida (order), Diplopoda (class), Myriapoda (subphylum), Arthropoda (phylum)	snout millipede	maximum in family; species tied for 3rd most in kingdom; most specimens have fewer	
375 pairs	Illacme plenipes (genus & species), Siphonorhinidae (family), Siphonophorida (order), Diplopoda (class), Myriapoda (subphylum), Arthropoda (phylum)	snout millipede	maximum in order; species with 2nd most in kingdom; 243 to 375 pairs in females; 157 to 279 pairs in males (excluding 2 pairs of gonopods)	
653 pairs	Eumillipes persephone (monotypic genus & species), Siphonotidae (family), Polyzoniida (order), Diplopoda (class), Myriapoda (subphylum), Arthropoda (phylum)	camphor millipede	maximum in kingdom; 499 to 653 pairs in females; 387 to 407 pairs in males (excluding 2 pairs of gonopods)	
