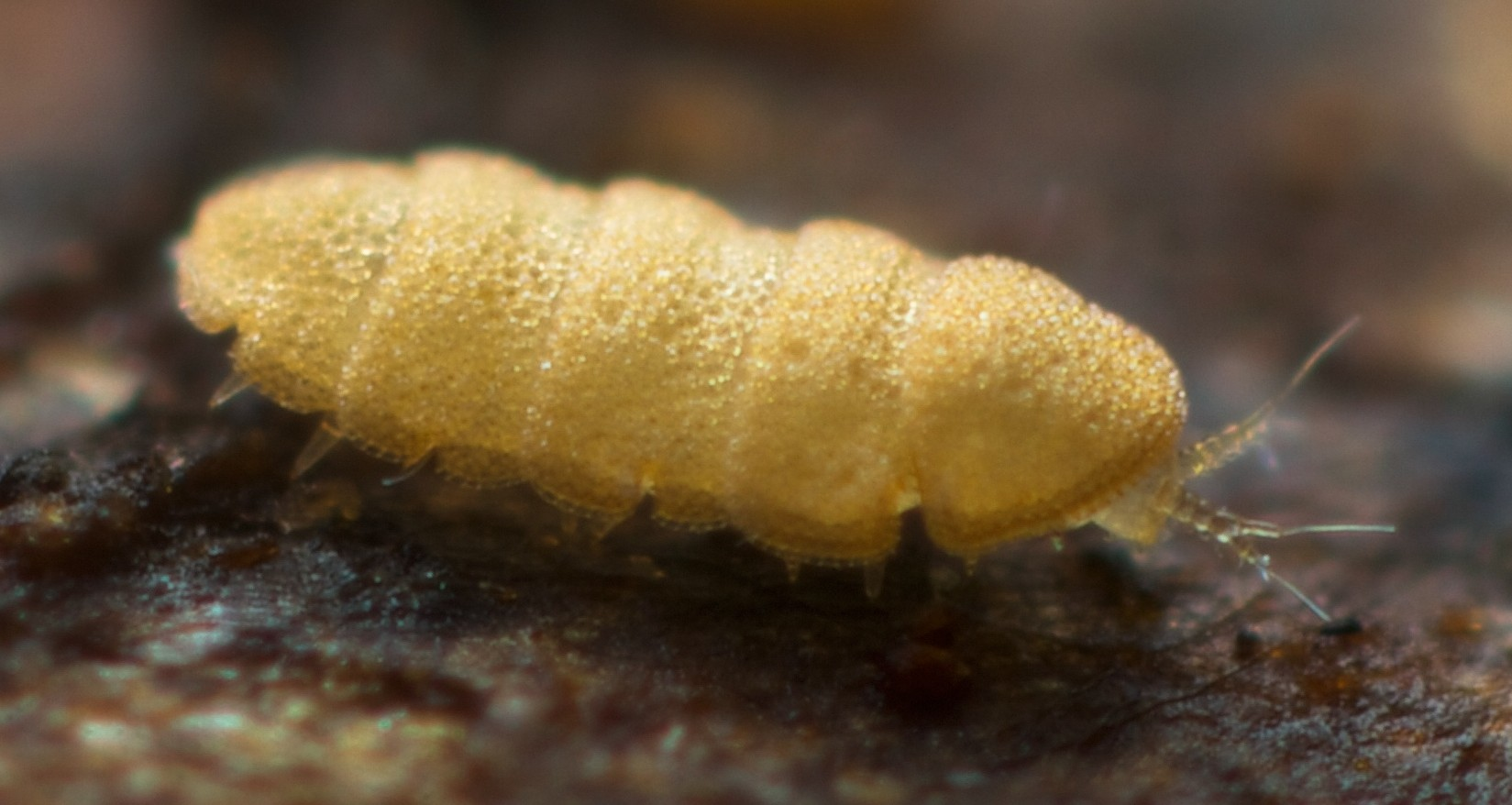
- Samarangopus sp.

Scientific classification
- Kingdom: Animalia
- Phylum: Arthropoda
- Subphylum: Myriapoda
- Class: Pauropoda
- Order: Tetramerocerata
- Family: Eurypauropodidae
- Genus: Samarangopus; Verhoeff, 1934

Synonyms
- Australopauropus ( Bagnall, 1935)

= Samarangopus =

Genus of arthropods

Samarangopus is a genus of pauropods in the family Eurypauropodidae. It has 38 species.
