= Decapauropus cuenoti =

Scientific classification
- Kingdom: Animalia
- Phylum: Arthropoda
- Subphylum: Myriapoda
- Class: Pauropoda
- Order: Tetramerocerata
- Family: Pauropodidae
- Genus: Decapauropus
- Species: D. cuenoti

Binomial name
- Decapauropus cuenoti Remy, 1931

Synonyms
- Allopauropus cuenoti (Remy, 1931)

Species of pauropod

Decapauropus cuenoti is a species of pauropod in the family Pauropodidae. As the name of the genus Decapauropus suggests, this species is notable for including females with ten pairs of legs instead of the nine leg pairs usually found in adult pauropods in the order Tetramerocerata. Before the discovery of D. cuenoti, adult pauropods were thought to have invariably nine pairs of legs.

== Discovery and taxonomy ==
This species was first described by the French zoologist Paul Remy in 1931 as the type species for the new genus Decapauropus. He based the original description of this species on three female specimens, one with ten pairs of legs and two with nine leg pairs, which he collected in 1930 from under rotting wood on compost near a farm in the Servance commune in France. In 1957, Remy demoted Decapauropus from a genus to a subgenus within the genus Allopauropus, but the Swedish zoologist Ulf Scheller restored Decapauropus as a separate genus in 2008.

== Description ==
This pauropod was the first of many species in the genus Decapauropus found to feature females with ten leg pairs. Even among adult females of this species, however, most have the usual nine leg pairs, and only a minority have the unusual tenth leg pair. These unusual females add the tenth pair in an additional adult stage beyond the five stages of post-embryonic development usually observed in the order Tetramerocerata. This extra stage features the twelve trunk segments usually found in adults in this order but adds an extra pair of legs. Although this extra adult stage is rare in warm and moist regions with favorable conditions for survival, females with ten leg pairs are generally more common where the environment is less hospitable.

The species D. cuenoti is pale, with an elongated body and a fusiform shape. The adult can reach 0.7 mm in length, with a maximum width of 0.2 mm in the middle of the body. The head is wider than long. The most anterior dorsal seta in the middle of the head is clavate, in front of four rows of similar dorsal setae.

This species exhibits many traits shared with other species in the genus Decapauropus. For example, this species has five-segmented legs for the first and last leg pairs and six-segmented legs for the pairs in between. The setae on the distal segments of the antennae and features of the pygidium (last segment), however, are useful in distinguishing among species.

In this species, each of the first three segments of the antennae features a pair of slightly clavate setae, and the distal end of the third segment also features a transverse slit with a third seta similar to the adjacent pair. The fourth and most distal segment features four setae: one cylindrical and tenuous, the other three clavate. The two shorter clavate setae appear on the ventral side; the third clavate seta is twice as long as the others and appears on the dorsal side. At the distal end of the fourth segment, two branches emerge: a ventral branch with a slightly clavate seta on the ventral side, two flagella (one short and one long), and a globulus, and a dorsal branch with a longer flagellum.

The pygidium is wider than long. The sternum features a lateral pair of setae as well as a posterior pair of longer setae that are about 3.5 times as long as the lateral pair. The anal plate attached to the middle of the posterior of the sternum takes the form of two lobes joined at the proximal end, each with a posterior extension and two slightly curved narrow horns.

== Distribution ==
This species has a subcosmopolitan distribution. This pauropod is common in Europe, where this species is more frequently found in the north than the south. In Europe, this species is found in Norway, Sweden, Denmark, Finland, Great Britain, Spain, France, the Netherlands, Belgium, Luxembourg, Germany, Switzerland, Austria, the Czech Republic, Hungary, Romania, Bosnia and Herzegovina, and Greece. This species is also found in Morocco, Algeria, Israel, Madeira, the Canary Islands, Réunion, and the United States.

== Habitat ==
In Europe, this species lives in deciduous as well as coniferous forests. This pauropod occurs in not only fresh meadows, vineyards, and gardens, but also in dry meadows, wasteland, and open-pit mining sites. This species is found in the litter layer, in grass sods, beneath moss, and under stones, as well as in soil, where this species favors deeper layers from 15 cm to 55 cm below the surface. Although D. cuenoti is typically found at depths between 15 cm and 30 cm, this species has been found as deep as 80 cm below the surface.

== Sex ratios and reproduction ==
This species features remarkably low ratios of males to females. In some regions, these sex ratios are so low as to suggest reproduction by parthenogenesis. Males appear to be especially scarce in regions where the environment is less favorable, and the extra adult stage for females with ten leg pairs may be an adaptation to parthenogenetic reproduction.

A study of sex ratios in this species in Europe and North Africa finds notable geographic variation in the scarcity of males. Males of this species are entirely absent in northern Europe and North Africa, but less scarce in central and southern Europe (where the male/female ratio is 0.3). This species also exhibits striking variation in the fraction of females with ten pairs of legs among these regions: Females with ten pairs of legs are absent in southern Europe, but nearly half (47 percent) have ten pairs of legs in northern Europe, where males are entirely absent. Females with ten pairs of legs are present elsewhere but represent a small minority of the adults in central Europe (9.6 percent) and North Africa (4.5 percent).
