= Devillea =

Devillea most commonly refers to:

- Devillea (millipede), a genus of flat-backed millipedes
- Devillea (plant), a genus of aquatic flowering plants
