= Eopauropus =

Scientific classification
- Domain: Eukaryota
- Kingdom: Animalia
- Phylum: Arthropoda
- Subphylum: Myriapoda
- Class: Pauropoda
- Order: Tetramerocerata
- Family: Pauropodidae
- Genus: †Eopauropus; Scheller, 2001
- Species: †E. balticus

Binomial name
- †Eopauropus balticus Scheller, 2001

Extinct species of many-legged arthropod

Eopauropus balticus is a prehistoric pauropod known from mid-Eocene Baltic amber. It is the only known pauropod in the fossil record. As pauropods are normally soil-dwelling, their presence in amber (fossilized tree sap) is unusual, and they are the rarest known animals in Baltic amber.
