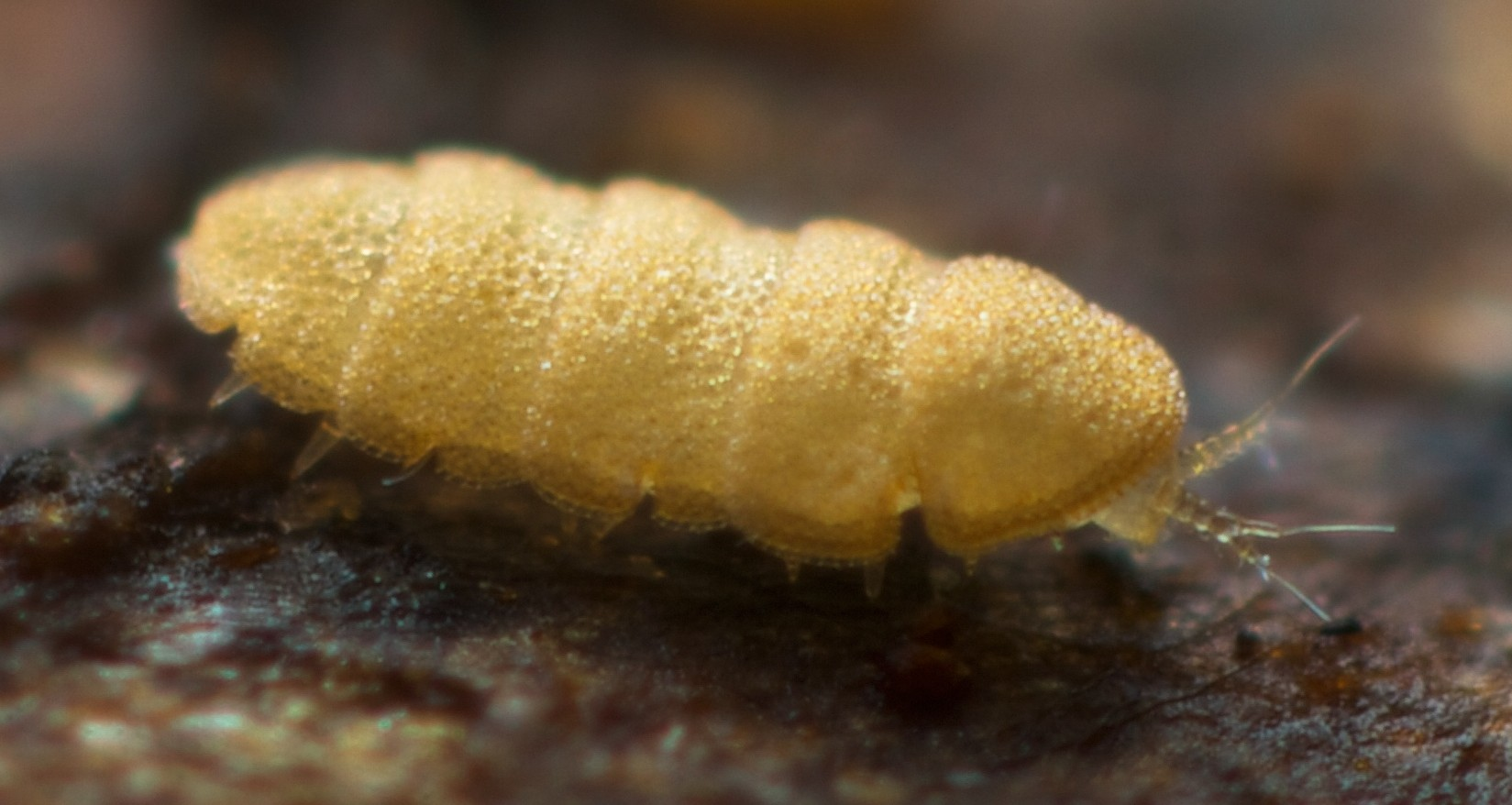
- Samarangopus sp.

Scientific classification
- Kingdom: Animalia
- Phylum: Arthropoda
- Subphylum: Myriapoda
- Class: Pauropoda
- Order: Tetramerocerata
- Family: Eurypauropodidae; Ryder, 1879

Genera
- Acopauropus; Eurypauropus; Samarangopus; Trachypauropus

= Eurypauropodidae =

Family of many-legged arthropods

Eurypauropodidae is a family of pauropods in the order Tetramerocerata. Pauropods in this family are found on all continents except South America and Antarctica. This family includes more than 70 species distributed among four genera.

== Discovery ==
This family was first described by the American zoologist John A. Ryder in 1879. He proposed this new family to contain the species Eurypauropus spinosus, which he discovered and described earlier in 1879. He found this species so different from all known pauropods as to warrant placement in a separate family. He based the original description of this species on five specimens he found under decaying wood in East Fairmount Park in Philadelphia, and he described this family after finding five more specimens in West Fairmount Park, across the Schuylkill River and about a mile from the site of the first discovery.

== Description ==
Although pauropods in this family generally measure less than 1 mm in length, some can reach 2.04 mm in length (in the Indonesian species Samarangopus amplissimus), and species in this family are relatively large for pauropods. Adults in this family feature trunks that range from a brownish yellow to brown, unlike most pauropods, which are nearly white even as adults. Juveniles in this family are more pale than adults and can be nearly white.

This family also features heavily sclerotized tergites, unlike most pauropods, which feature weakly sclerotized tergites. Pauropods in this family feature six tergites that cover the whole body, including the head and the pygidium. Each tergite is entire rather than divided into multiple sclerites. The surface of these tergites is coarse and ornamented with many kinds of tubercles, marginal extensions, and modified rather than simple setae. The first tergite is notably narrower than the next three tergites. The ventral side of these tergites lack longitudinal furrows along the lateral sides.

The body in this family is robust with a flattened oval shape. These pauropods have no ability to coil their bodies. The middle of the posterior end of the sternum of the pygidium has only one anal plate attached.

Adults in this family feature nine pairs of short legs that are only partially visible while the pauropod is walking. Each leg of the first and last pairs features five segments; each of the other legs features either five or six segments. These pauropods are capable of strikingly fast movement.

== Habitat ==
Unlike most pauropods, which are small and prefer to penetrate deep into the soil, pauropods in this family are larger and favor litter rather than soil for their habitat. The thick cuticle in this family also allows pauropods in this family to resist the effects of drought, whereas most pauropod species are sensitive to dry conditions and favor humid environments.

== Genera and distribution ==
This family includes the following genera:

- Acopauropus Cook, 1896
- Eurypauropus Ryder, 1879
- Samarangopus Verhoeff, 1934
- Trachypauropus Tömösvary, 1882

The largest genus in this family is Samarangopus, which includes 38 species. This genus also has the broadest distribution in this family, with most species found in the Indomalayan realm (in Nepal, Thailand, Vietnam, the Philippines, and Indonesia, as well as on Borneo), but also extending to the Afrotropical realm (in Rwanda, Madagascar, Mauritius, and Réunion), the Australasian realm (on the mainland of Australia, as well as in Papua New Guinea, New Zealand, and New Caledonia), and the eastern Palearctic realm (in Japan). The other three genera are restricted to the Holarctic realm. The genus Eurypauropus includes 11 species, which are found in the Nearctic realm (in the United States) and the Palearctic realm (in Japan). The genus Trachypauropus includes 12 species, which are found in the Palearctic realm (in Great Britain, Spain, France, Italy, Switzerland, Austria, Hungary, Romania, the Balkans, Turkey, and Israel). The genus Acopauropus includes 11 species, which are found in the Palearctic realm (in Algeria, Spain, France, Germany, Switzerland, Austria, the Czech Republic, Poland, Romania, the Balkans, Georgia, and Korea).
