= Dinogeophilus =

Scientific classification
- Kingdom: Animalia
- Phylum: Arthropoda
- Subphylum: Myriapoda
- Class: Chilopoda
- Order: Geophilomorpha
- Family: Schendylidae
- Genus: Dinogeophilus; Silvestri, 1909

Type species
- Dinogeophilus pauropus Silvestri, 1909

Species
- Dinogeophilus pauropus; Dinogeophilus oligopodus

Genus of centipedes

Dinogeophilus is a genus of soil centipedes in the family Schendylidae. This genus contains only two species, Dinogeophilus pauropus and D. oligopodus, which range from 4.5 to 5.5 mm (0.18 to 0.22 in) in length. These species are notable as the smallest not only in the order Geophilomorpha but also in any epimorphic order of centipedes. The species D. oligopodus is also notable as one of only six species of soil centipedes to feature only 29 pairs of legs and one of only two species to include females with only 29 pairs, the minimum number recorded for females in the order Geophilomorpha.

== Discovery and distribution ==
This genus was created by the Italian entomologist Filippo Silvestri in 1909 to contain the newly discovered type species D. pauropus. This species is known from only one specimen, a male collected near Salto, along the Uruguay river, in Uruguay. In 1984, the zoologist Luis Alberto Pereira described the second species in this genus, D. oligopodus, based on five specimens collected near Puerto Iguazu, close to the Paraná river, in the Missiones province of Argentina. These specimens include a male holotype, three male paratypes, and one female allotype. Since the original description of D. oligopodus, Pereira and three biologists from the University of Padua (Lucio Bonato, Alessandro Minelli, and Leandro Drago) examined seven more specimens (two males and five females) collected from La Plata in Argentina. All thirteen specimens of this genus are adults or at least subadults, based on an examination of the size and shape of the gonopods. All specimens of the genus have been found in a small region of South America, straddling Uruguay and Argentina, between the northern Pampas and the Brazilian Highlands, in the middle and lower part of the basin of the Uruguay and Paraná rivers.

== Description ==
Centipedes in this genus have a single lamella on each mandible, second maxillae that are flattened at the distal end, incomplete chitin-lines on the sternum of the forcipular segment, forcipules with denticles along the intermediate part of the ultimate article, and a telson without anal pores. A longitudinally elongate elliptical cluster of pores appears on the ventral surface of each of the anterior leg-bearing segments after the first, but these pore-fields are limited to the anterior part the trunk. Each of the ultimate legs features a single pore on the basal element (coxopleuron) and ends in a single tiny spine rather than a claw.

Based on a comparison with the single male specimen of D. pauropus, the species D. oligopodus may be distinguished based on other traits. Whereas D. pauropus features tubercles on the surface of its most posterior leg-bearing segments, these tubercles are absent in D. oligopodus. These two species also feature different numbers of legs: Whereas D. oligopodus has 29 pairs of legs in each sex, D. pauropus has 31 leg pairs in the male specimen. The D. pauropus specimen is also larger than most specimens of D. oligopodus: Whereas the D. pauropus specimen measures 5.5 mm in length, the specimens of D. oligopodus are usually smaller, with the holotype measuring 5 mm in length and most specimens measuring only 4.5 mm in length.

== Taxonomy and phylogeny ==
Silvestri originally described Dinogeophilus as a genus in the family Geophilidae in 1909. Authorities continued to regard this genus as a member of that family for more than a century, until Bonato, Minelli, Drago, and Pereira reassessed the phylogenetic position of this genus in 2015. Using new specimens collected by Pereira, scanning electronic microscopy, and molecular data, Bonato and his colleagues placed this genus in the family Schendylidae instead. Analysis of the molecular evidence consistently found Dinogophilus nested among the Schendylidae in a phylogenetic tree.
