= Decapauropus =

Scientific classification
- Domain: Eukaryota
- Kingdom: Animalia
- Phylum: Arthropoda
- Subphylum: Myriapoda
- Class: Pauropoda
- Order: Tetramerocerata
- Family: Pauropodidae
- Genus: Decapauropus; Remy, 1931

Genus of pauropods

Decapauropus is a large genus of pauropods in the family Pauropodidae that includes more than 300 species. This genus was originally described by the French zoologist Paul Remy in 1931 to contain the newly discovered type species Decapauropus cuenoti. As the name of this genus suggests, this genus is notable for including females with ten pairs of legs instead of the nine leg pairs usually found in adult pauropods in the order Tetramerocerata. Before the discovery of D. cuenoti, adult pauropods were thought to have invariably nine pairs of legs.

== Description ==
In 1957, Remy demoted Decapauropus from a genus to a subgenus within the genus Allopauropus, but the Swedish zoologist Ulf Scheller restored Decapauropus as a separate genus in 2008. Pauropods in both genera have five-segmented legs for the first and last leg pairs and six-segmented legs for the pairs in between. The two genera can be distinguished, however, by the setae on the pygidial sternum: Whereas Decapauropus has two pairs of setae, Allopauropus has three pairs. Furthermore, the two genera differ in the subadult (fourth) stage of post-embryonic development in terms of the setae on the pygidial tergum: Whereas Decapauropus has only one pair of setae, Allopauropus has two pairs.

Despite the name of the genus, only some species in this genus are known to feature females with ten leg pairs. The species known to feature these females include not only D. cuenoti but also other species later found to feature females with ten leg pairs, for example, D. gracilis, D. vulgaris, and D. productus. Even among adult females of these species, however, most have the usual nine leg pairs, and only a minority have the unusual tenth leg pair. These unusual females add the tenth pair in an additional adult stage beyond the five stages of post-embryonic development usually observed in the order Tetramerocerata. This extra stage features the twelve trunk segments usually found in adults in this order but adds an extra pair of legs. Although this extra adult stage is rare in warm and moist regions with favorable conditions for survival, females with ten leg pairs are generally more common where the environment is less hospitable.

== Distribution ==
This genus has a subcosmopolitan distribution. Some individual species in this genus are also widely distributed: The species D. cuenoti, D. gracilis, and D. vulgaris, for example, are subcosmopolitan. The species D. cuenoti is common in Europe but also found in North Africa, the Mascarene Islands, and the United States, D. gracilis is common in Europe but is also found in Africa, South Asia, and the Americas, D. vulgaris is common in Europe but also found in Africa, Sri Lanka, and North America, and D. productus occurs mainly around the Mediterranean but is also found in Iraq and the United States.

== Sex ratios and reproduction ==
The species D. cuenoti, D. gracilis, D. productus, and D. vulgaris are among the pauropod species with remarkably low ratios of males to females. In some regions, these sex ratios are so low as to suggest reproduction by parthenogenesis. Males appear to be especially scarce in regions where the environment is less favorable, and the extra adult stage for females with ten leg pairs may be an adaptation to parthenogenetic reproduction in some species.

Studies of sex ratios in D. cuenoti, D. gracilis, D. productus, and D. vulgaris in Europe and North Africa find some geographic variation in the scarcity of males. Although males of the species D. gracilis are almost uniformly scarce in Europe and North Africa (with about twice as many females as males), there are notable differences among regions in the sex ratios observed in the other three species: Males of the species D. cuenoti are entirely absent in northern Europe and North Africa, but less scarce in central and southern Europe (where the male/female ratio is 0.3); D. vulgaris exhibits a similar geographic pattern over the same range. Males of the Mediterranean species D. productus are more scarce in North Africa and the Canary Islands (where the male/female ratio is 0.3) than in Europe (where the male/female ratio is 0.8).

A study of D. cuenoti, D. gracilis, and D. vulgaris finds that the fraction of females with ten pairs of legs varies not only among species but also among regions in Europe and North Africa. These females are present in populations of D. gracilis from northern Europe to North Africa, representing between 3 and 10 percent of adults in that range. Females with ten pairs of legs are absent in populations of D. vulgaris in southern Europe and North Africa, however, and rare in populations of that species in northern and central Europe, where they represent less than 1 percent of adults. Populations of D. cuenoti exhibit the most striking geographic variation: Females of this species with ten pairs of legs are absent in southern Europe, but nearly half (47 percent) have ten pairs of legs in northern Europe, where males are entirely absent. Females with ten pairs of legs are present elsewhere in D. cuenoti populations but represent a small minority of the adults in central Europe (9.6 percent) and North Africa (4.5 percent).

== Species ==
The following species are recognized in the genus:

- Decapauropus absimilis (Scheller, 2004)
- Decapauropus acer (Scheller, 1994)
- Decapauropus aceratos (Remy & Bello, 1960)
- Decapauropus aculeatus (Remy, 1954)
- Decapauropus acuticaudis (Scheller, 2007)
- Decapauropus acutilinguis (Scheller, 1982)
- Decapauropus acutus (Remy, 1948)
- Decapauropus adfinis (Remy & Rollet, 1960)
- Decapauropus adiaphorus Scheller, 2013
- Decapauropus adisi (Scheller, 1994)
- Decapauropus aduncus (Scheller, 1997)
- Decapauropus aegyptiacus (Remy, 1950)
- Decapauropus aequinoctialis (Remy, 1948)
- Decapauropus aius (Scheller, 1997)
- Decapauropus alaskae (Remy, 1957)
- Decapauropus alsiosus (Remy & Balland, 1958)
- Decapauropus ambiguus (Remy, 1956)
- Decapauropus ambilensis (Remy & Rollet, 1960)
- Decapauropus anatanosus Scheller, 2011
- Decapauropus anatonus Scheller, 2011
- Decapauropus andriai (Remy, 1956)
- Decapauropus angadus (Remy, 1952)
- Decapauropus angustus (Remy, 1955)
- Decapauropus ankaratrensis (Remy & Bello, 1960)
- Decapauropus annulicordatus Qian, 2015
- Decapauropus anomoios (Scheller, 1997)
- Decapauropus apicalis (Gai & Scheller, 2007)
- Decapauropus arbusculosus (Remy & Bello, 1960)
- Decapauropus arcifer (Remy, 1956)
- Decapauropus arcuatilis Scheller, 2011
- Decapauropus arcuatus (Scheller, 2007)
- Decapauropus aristatus (Remy, 1936)
- Decapauropus ashworthi (Bagnall, 1935)
- Decapauropus aspergillifer (Remy, 1948)
- Decapauropus asperosus (Scheller, 1984)
- Decapauropus assalinoe (Scheller, 1998)
- Decapauropus asymmetricus (Scheller, 1994)
- Decapauropus atlantis (Remy, 1952)
- Decapauropus attemsi (Remy, 1952)
- Decapauropus attenuatus Scheller, 2009
- Decapauropus baculatus (Scheller, 1970)
- Decapauropus bakoensis (Scheller, 2007)
- Decapauropus barbarus (Remy & Moyne, 1960)
- Decapauropus barbatulus (Scheller, 2004)
- Decapauropus barcinonensis (Remy, 1933)
- Decapauropus barroisi (Remy, 1956)
- Decapauropus baudoti (Remy, 1956)
- Decapauropus bedosae (Scheller, 1995)
- Decapauropus bellingeri (Remy, 1958)
- Decapauropus bernardi (Scheller, 2005)
- Decapauropus biclavulus Dong & Qian, 2015
- Decapauropus biconjugarus Qian & Bu, 2018
- Decapauropus bicornutus (Scheller, 1994)
- Decapauropus bicuspidatus (Remy, 1956)
- Decapauropus bidens (Remy, 1946)
- Decapauropus bidentulus (Scheller, 2007)
- Decapauropus bidrepanoides Qian, 2013
- Decapauropus bifidus (Remy, 1956)
- Decapauropus bifurcodicoccus Qian & Dong, 2013
- Decapauropus bifurcus (Remy, 1948)
- Decapauropus bilanceolatus (Scheller, 1995)
- Decapauropus bilinguis (Scheller, 1970)
- Decapauropus binodulosus (Scheller, 1995)
- Decapauropus bipertitus Scheller, 2013
- Decapauropus bispinosus (Scheller, 1995)
- Decapauropus bispinus Scheller, 2009
- Decapauropus bitruncatus (Scheller, 1975)
- Decapauropus bituberatus (Scheller, 1970)
- Decapauropus blandinae (Remy, 1957)
- Decapauropus bohnsacki (Remy, 1957)
- Decapauropus borneonesiota (Scheller, 1994)
- Decapauropus bouini (Remy, 1955)
- Decapauropus bounourei (Remy, 1954)
- Decapauropus boureanus (Scheller, 1995)
- Decapauropus bovistellus (Scheller, 2005)
- Decapauropus brachycaulis (Scheller, 1968)
- Decapauropus brachypodus (Scheller, 1994)
- Decapauropus brachytes (Scheller, 2004)
- Decapauropus brazzavillensis (Remy, 1962)
- Decapauropus brevilingulus Scheller, 2011
- Decapauropus brevis Scheller, 2009
- Decapauropus brevitas Scheller, 2013
- Decapauropus brincki (Scheller, 1962)
- Decapauropus broelemanni (Remy, 1935)
- Decapauropus bucinator (Remy, 1948)
- Decapauropus bulbifer (Remy, 1950)
- Decapauropus burbunensis (Remy, 1956)
- Decapauropus burghardti (Remy, 1942)
- Decapauropus burrowesi (Harrison, 1914)
- Decapauropus campinaranicus (Scheller, 1997)
- Decapauropus camurus Scheller, 2013
- Decapauropus capillaris Scheller, 2011
- Decapauropus capillatus (Remy & Balland, 1958)
- Decapauropus careiroensis (Scheller, 1997)
- Decapauropus caribicus (Scheller, 1990)
- Decapauropus carmelitanus (Scheller, 1956)
- Decapauropus cederholmi (Scheller, 1995)
- Decapauropus chartoni (Remy, 1956)
- Decapauropus chauliosetus (Scheller, 2005)
- Decapauropus chiangmaiensis (Scheller, 1995)
- Decapauropus chichinii (Remy, 1950)
- Decapauropus cibodasensis (Scheller, 2007)
- Decapauropus clavator (Remy, 1948)
- Decapauropus clavulus Scheller, 2013
- Decapauropus cognatus (Remy, 1956)
- Decapauropus compactus Scheller, 2013
- Decapauropus compatruelis (Remy & Rollet, 1960)
- Decapauropus condei (Remy, 1947)
- Decapauropus conformis (Scheller, 2004)
- Decapauropus congolanus (Remy, 1954)
- Decapauropus connectens (Scheller, 1990)
- Decapauropus consociatus (Remy, 1956)
- Decapauropus conus Scheller, 2009
- Decapauropus convexus Scheller, 2009
- Decapauropus cordatus (Scheller, 1970)
- Decapauropus cornutus (Remy, 1936)
- Decapauropus corsicus (Remy, 1940)
- Decapauropus crassatus (Scheller, 2007)
- Decapauropus crassescens (Shen & Song, 2007)
- Decapauropus crassipes (Remy, 1956)
- Decapauropus cuenoti Remy, 1931
- Decapauropus curtus (Scheller, 2007)
- Decapauropus curvatus (Scheller, 1970)
- Decapauropus cutellatus Qian, 2014
- Decapauropus cylindricus (Scheller, 2005)
- Decapauropus dacicus (Remy, 1939)
- Decapauropus dacintrai (Scheller, 1995)
- Decapauropus dahli (Scheller, 1962)
- Decapauropus damodarani (Scheller, 1976)
- Decapauropus delphini (Remy, 1956)
- Decapauropus dendriformis (Hagino, 1993)
- Decapauropus dendrophorus (Remy, 1956)
- Decapauropus denisi (Remy, 1936)
- Decapauropus dentatus (Scheller, 1970)
- Decapauropus deorsus (Scheller, 2004)
- Decapauropus digitifer (Remy, 1956)
- Decapauropus dionysii (Remy, 1956)
- Decapauropus disappendicalis (Scheller, 1997)
- Decapauropus dischides (Scheller, 1997)
- Decapauropus disparidactylus (Scheller, 1975)
- Decapauropus disphaeroides (Shen & Song, 2007)
- Decapauropus distinctus (Bagnall, 1936)
- Decapauropus divaricatus (Scheller, 2007)
- Decapauropus doryphorus (Remy, 1936)
- Decapauropus duomamillatus Qian & Dong, 2013
- Decapauropus duplus Scheller, 2013
- Decapauropus dybasi (Remy, 1957)
- Decapauropus eburnensis (Remy, 1957)
- Decapauropus egregius (Remy, 1959)
- Decapauropus ethiopicus (Scheller, 1999)
- Decapauropus eurous (Remy & Rollet, 1960)
- Decapauropus everriculiger (Remy & Bittard, 1956)
- Decapauropus excavatus (Scheller, 1970)
- Decapauropus excornis (Remy, 1958)
- Decapauropus exiguus (Remy, 1953)
- Decapauropus extenuatus (Scheller, 1982)
- Decapauropus extremus Scheller, 2014
- Decapauropus exul (Remy, 1956)
- Decapauropus fagei (Remy, 1942)
- Decapauropus fibratus (Scheller, 1970)
- Decapauropus finitimus Scheller, 2013
- Decapauropus flabellifer (Remy, 1960)
- Decapauropus florisimilis (Krestewa, 1940)
- Decapauropus foliaceus (Scheller, 1970)
- Decapauropus forcipiformis Scheller, 2013
- Decapauropus fortisus (Hagino, 1991)
- Decapauropus foucquei (Remy, 1956)
- Decapauropus fruticulus Scheller, 2013
- Decapauropus furcosus (Remy, 1959)
- Decapauropus furcula Silvestri, 1902
- Decapauropus fuscinifer (Remy, 1936)
- Decapauropus fusifer (Remy, 1956)
- Decapauropus fustifer (Remy, 1959)
- Decapauropus fustisetosus Scheller, 2013
- Decapauropus gadesensis (Remy, 1954)
- Decapauropus gaetulicus (Remy, 1953)
- Decapauropus gamba Scheller, 2013
- Decapauropus geniculatus (Remy & Bello, 1960)
- Decapauropus gentilis (Remy, 1956)
- Decapauropus glomeratus Scheller, 2013
- Decapauropus gracilentus (Remy, 1955)
- Decapauropus gracilis (Hansen, 1902)
- Decapauropus grandicollis (Scheller, 1995)
- Decapauropus hamatus (Remy, 1959)
- Decapauropus haplotes Scheller, 2013
- Decapauropus heis Scheller, 2009
- Decapauropus helophorus (Remy, 1936)
- Decapauropus helveticus (Hansen, 1902)
- Decapauropus hessei (Remy, 1935)
- Decapauropus hexagonalis (Scheller, 1970)
- Decapauropus hiltenae (Scheller, 2005)
- Decapauropus hispidus Scheller, 2013
- Decapauropus hortulanus (Remy, 1961)
- Decapauropus hylaios (Scheller, 1997)
- Decapauropus hypopsilos Scheller, 2013
- Decapauropus hypopsilus Scheller, 2013
- Decapauropus ibarakiensis (Hagino, 1991)
- Decapauropus ieenus (Scheller, 1997)
- Decapauropus improcerus Scheller, 2013
- Decapauropus indicus (Remy, 1961)
- Decapauropus infurcatus (Hagino, 1991)
- Decapauropus inordinatus Scheller, 2013
- Decapauropus insignis (Remy, 1961)
- Decapauropus insulanus Remy, 1945
- Decapauropus insularis (Scheller, 1970)
- Decapauropus intonsus (Remy, 1956)
- Decapauropus irmgardae (Scheller, 1994)
- Decapauropus isodacintrai (Scheller, 2005)
- Decapauropus janauariensis (Scheller, 2002)
- Decapauropus jasperensis (Remy, 1959)
- Decapauropus javanus (Scheller, 2007)
- Decapauropus junki (Scheller, 1997)
- Decapauropus kabalaensis (Scheller, 1995)
- Decapauropus kabylus (Remy, 1952)
- Decapauropus kangeorum (Scheller, 1995)
- Decapauropus kartotrichos Scheller, 2013
- Decapauropus katernes Scheller, 2013
- Decapauropus kenyanus (Scheller, 1999)
- Decapauropus kinabaluensis (Scheller, 2001)
- Decapauropus kocheri (Remy, 1952)
- Decapauropus kordylinos (Scheller, 1997)
- Decapauropus korynetes (Scheller, 1997)
- Decapauropus krionensis (Scheller, 1995)
- Decapauropus krishnani Sundara Rajulu, 1966
- Decapauropus lambertoni (Remy, 1956)
- Decapauropus lanhami (Remy, 1958)
- Decapauropus lankensis (Remy, 1962)
- Decapauropus latistylus (Remy, 1939)
- Decapauropus laurinus (Scheller, 1962)
- Decapauropus leconteorum (Remy, 1958)
- Decapauropus lemoinei (Remy & Rollet, 1960)
- Decapauropus leptotarsus (Scheller, 2004)
- Decapauropus lerefaiti (Remy, 1961)
- Decapauropus ligulifer (Remy, 1948)
- Decapauropus ligulosus (Hagino, 1991)
- Decapauropus linguatulus (Scheller, 2004)
- Decapauropus linguoides Scheller, 2009
- Decapauropus linsleyi (Remy, 1958)
- Decapauropus lobiger (Remy, 1956)
- Decapauropus ludovicae (Remy, 1945)
- Decapauropus macropygus (Scheller, 1993)
- Decapauropus maheicus (Scheller, 1982)
- Decapauropus mameti (Remy, 1959)
- Decapauropus manjakatompensis (Remy & Bello, 1960)
- Decapauropus marshalli (Scheller, 1984)
- Decapauropus mauretanicus (Remy & Moyne, 1960)
- Decapauropus megalochaetus (Remy, 1948)
- Decapauropus megalosphaerus (Remy & Bello, 1960)
- Decapauropus meridianus (Remy, 1941)
- Decapauropus microstylus (Remy, 1958)
- Decapauropus milloti (Remy, 1945)
- Decapauropus millotianus (Leclerc, 1953)
- Decapauropus minimus Loksa, 1966
- Decapauropus minuscellus Scheller, 2009
- Decapauropus minusculus (Scheller, 1993)
- Decapauropus mirimus (Scheller, 1997)
- Decapauropus mixus (Remy, 1957)
- Decapauropus moesiacus (Remy, 1945)
- Decapauropus monachorum (Remy, 1945)
- Decapauropus montidiabolus (Scheller, 2004)
- Decapauropus moreauxi (Remy, 1959)
- Decapauropus mortensenii (Hansen, 1902)
- Decapauropus mucronatus (Remy, 1958)
- Decapauropus multiarcuatus (Scheller, 1970)
- Decapauropus multifidus (Scheller, 1990)
- Decapauropus multiplex (Remy, 1936)
- Decapauropus multivirgatus Scheller, 2013
- Decapauropus neotropicus (Scheller, 1994)
- Decapauropus notius (Remy, 1957)
- Decapauropus obtusus (Scheller, 1970)
- Decapauropus orestes Scheller, 2012
- Decapauropus ovalapendicis Zhang & Chen, 1988
- Decapauropus ovatus (Scheller, 1993)
- Decapauropus oviformis Scheller, 2013
- Decapauropus pachyflagellus (Scheller, 1997)
- Decapauropus paeninsularis (Scheller, 1995)
- Decapauropus parkeri (Scheller, 2005)
- Decapauropus parvus (Remy, 1958)
- Decapauropus pasqualinii (Remy, 1952)
- Decapauropus pectinatus (Hansen, 1902)
- Decapauropus pedicellus (Scheller, 1994)
- Decapauropus pediger (Remy, 1961)
- Decapauropus perturbatius (Scheller, 1970)
- Decapauropus petiolatus (Scheller, 1994)
- Decapauropus phakoides (Scheller, 2005)
- Decapauropus pilosisphaerus Zhang & Chen, 1988
- Decapauropus pilosus (Scheller, 1970)
- Decapauropus pirilis (Scheller, 1970)
- Decapauropus pluriramosus (Remy, 1939)
- Decapauropus polyramatus (Scheller, 1970)
- Decapauropus porterensis (Scheller, 2005)
- Decapauropus premnos Scheller, 2011
- Decapauropus productus (Silvestri, 1902)
- Decapauropus prolixus Scheller, 2011
- Decapauropus prolongatus (Scheller, 2007)
- Decapauropus proximus (Remy, 1948)
- Decapauropus prunilis (Scheller, 1970)
- Decapauropus pseudokoreanus (Hagino, 1991)
- Decapauropus pseudomillotianus (Remy & Balland, 1958)
- Decapauropus pulcher (Remy, 1956)
- Decapauropus pumilio (Remy, 1956)
- Decapauropus purchasensis (Scheller, 2005)
- Decapauropus pygmaeus (Hansen, 1902)
- Decapauropus pyrenaeus (Scheller, 1973)
- Decapauropus pyriformis Scheller, 2014
- Decapauropus quadridentatus (Scheller, 1982)
- Decapauropus quadrimaculatus (Scheller, 1985)
- Decapauropus quadriramosus (Scheller, 1995)
- Decapauropus quadrispinus (Scheller, 2007)
- Decapauropus quinquangularis (Scheller, 1970)
- Decapauropus radiosus (Scheller, 1993)
- Decapauropus ramosus (Scheller, 1962)
- Decapauropus ramulentus Scheller, 2013
- Decapauropus ramulosus (Remy, 1961)
- Decapauropus ramusculus Scheller, 2013
- Decapauropus rastifer (Remy, 1948)
- Decapauropus rectus Scheller, 2009
- Decapauropus remigatus (Scheller, 1984)
- Decapauropus remyi (Bagnall, 1935)
- Decapauropus rhopalophorus (Remy, 1947)
- Decapauropus rhopalotes Scheller, 2013
- Decapauropus ribauti (Remy, 1937)
- Decapauropus robinsonius (Scheller, 1968)
- Decapauropus rostratus (Krestewa, 1940)
- Decapauropus ruffoi (Remy, 1959)
- Decapauropus sagitta Scheller, 2013
- Decapauropus saltuarius Scheller, 2009
- Decapauropus sanctijohni (Scheller, 1990)
- Decapauropus sanctivincenti (Remy, 1962)
- Decapauropus scoparius (Remy, 1954)
- Decapauropus scutulatus Scheller, 2009
- Decapauropus serapiensis (Scheller, 2007)
- Decapauropus serpentis Scheller, 2013
- Decapauropus sessilis (Scheller, 1993)
- Decapauropus seychellicus (Scheller, 1982)
- Decapauropus silvaticus (Scheller, 1993)
- Decapauropus sinuosus (Scheller, 1994)
- Decapauropus sodalicus (Scheller, 1973)
- Decapauropus spec Scheller, 1995
- Decapauropus sphen Scheller, 2013
- Decapauropus sphenoides Scheller, 2009
- Decapauropus spicatus (Remy, 1957)
- Decapauropus squameus (Remy, 1948)
- Decapauropus stenygros (Scheller, 2005)
- Decapauropus stocksi (Scheller, 2005)
- Decapauropus subauricularis (Scheller, 1990)
- Decapauropus sulawesicus Scheller, 2009
- Decapauropus suppeditatus (Scheller, 2005)
- Decapauropus syntomos Scheller, 2013
- Decapauropus tamulus (Remy, 1961)
- Decapauropus tanaos Scheller, 2013
- Decapauropus tenellus (Scheller, 1971)
- Decapauropus tenuilobatus (Scheller, 1994)
- Decapauropus tenuis (Remy, 1948)
- Decapauropus terrestris Scheller, 2009
- Decapauropus terrulentus Scheller, 2013
- Decapauropus tetraramosus (Hagino, 1991)
- Decapauropus thailandensis (Scheller, 1995)
- Decapauropus thalassophilus (Remy, 1935)
- Decapauropus therapnaeus (Leclerc, 1953)
- Decapauropus tibeticus Qian & Bu, 2018
- Decapauropus tillierae (Scheller, 1993)
- Decapauropus tohoius (Scheller, 1997)
- Decapauropus tomlini (Scheller, 1984)
- Decapauropus tonsilis (Remy, 1961)
- Decapauropus toshiyukii (Hagino, 1991)
- Decapauropus transilvanus (Remy, 1939)
- Decapauropus trapezoides (Scheller, 2007)
- Decapauropus triangularis (Scheller, 1990)
- Decapauropus tribulosus Qian, 2015
- Decapauropus trilobionos Scheller, 2013
- Decapauropus tripartitus (Krestewa, 1940)
- Decapauropus turgidus Scheller, 2009
- Decapauropus umbrosus (Scheller, 1995)
- Decapauropus undulatulus Scheller, 2011
- Decapauropus undulatus Scheller, 2012
- Decapauropus ungulatus Scheller, 2009
- Decapauropus unioensis (Scheller, 1993)
- Decapauropus usingeri (Remy, 1958)
- Decapauropus vegrandis Scheller, 2013
- Decapauropus verrucosus (Scheller, 1968)
- Decapauropus verticillatus (Scheller, 1971)
- Decapauropus viarti (Remy, 1961)
- Decapauropus villosus (Remy, 1945)
- Decapauropus vinsoni (Remy, 1959)
- Decapauropus virgininsularis (Scheller, 1990)
- Decapauropus virgosus Scheller, 2013
- Decapauropus virgulatus (Scheller, 2005)
- Decapauropus vitticolus (Hansen, 1902)
- Decapauropus vulgaris (Hansen, 1902)
- Decapauropus whanganuiensis Scheller, 2010
- Decapauropus yamizo (Hagino, 1991)
- Decapauropus yoshii (Scheller, 2001)
- Decapauropus zaianus (Remy, 1952)
