= Aletopauropus =

Scientific classification
- Kingdom: Animalia
- Phylum: Arthropoda
- Subphylum: Myriapoda
- Class: Pauropoda
- Order: Tetramerocerata
- Family: Brachypauropodidae
- Genus: Aletopauropus; MacSwain & Lanham, 1948

Type species
- Aletopauropus lentus MacSwain & Lanham, 1948

Species
- Aletopauropus lentus; Aletopauropus tanakai

Genus of pauropod

Aletopauropus is a genus of pauropods in the family Brachypauropodidae. This genus includes only two species: the type species, A. lentus, which is found in California, and a second species, A. tanakai, which is found in Japan. This genus is notable as one of only four genera of pauropods in which adults have only eight pairs of legs rather than the nine leg pairs usually found in adults in the order Tetramerocerata. Before the discovery of Aletopauropus, adult pauropods were described as having only nine or (rarely) ten pairs of legs.

== Discovery and distribution ==
The genus Aletopauropus and its type species A. lentus were first described in 1948 by the zoologists John W. MacSwain and Urless N. Lanham of the University of California at Berkeley. MacSwain and Lanham based their descriptions on twelve specimens that MacSwain collected in 1947. These specimens include a male holotype, a female allotype, seven paratypes (one male and six females), and three juveniles representing two earlier stages of post-embryonic development, all found in Berkeley in Alameda county in California. In 1984, the Swedish zoologist Ulf Scheller reported the discovery of specimens on Vancouver island and in Garibaldi Park, both sites in British Columbia, that he provisionally identified as A. lentus, but he expressed doubts about this identification. More recently, Scheller has described the range of A. lentus as limited to California.

In 1989, the biologist Yasunori Hagino of Ibaraki University the second species in this genus, A. tanakai. He based the original description of this species on one female holotype and three female partypes, all collected in Japan. The holotype and two paratypes were collected in 1985 in Ehime Prefecture on the island of Shikoku, whereas the other paratype was collected in 1984 in Ibaraki Prefecture on the island of Honshu. Since the original description of this species, several more specimens including four juveniles and at least one male have been recorded on the island of Honshu, found in Tochigi Prefecture, Saitama Prefecture, Chiba Prefecture, and Yamanashi Prefecture.

== Description ==
Both species in this genus are small: The species A. lentus ranges from 0.56 mm to 0.60 mm in length. The species A. tanakai is larger, ranging from 0.66 mm to 0.76 mm in length. The head in this genus features three transverse rows of setae. Two to four tube-like extensions protrude from the temporal organ on each side of the head.

Adults in this genus have only eight pairs of legs, and each leg has five segments. These pauropods go through the first four stages of post-embryonic development typical of species in the order Tetramerocerata, with three leg pairs in the first stage, five pairs in the second, six pairs in the third, and eight pairs in the fourth, but reach sexual maturity in the fourth stage rather than in a fifth stage and do not add the ninth pair of legs that usually appear in a fifth stage for other species in this order. Thus, adults of this species also have only eleven trunk segments and five tergites and do not acquire the twelfth trunk segment and sixth tergite that other species in this order usually add in a fifth stage.

The first tergite is entire, with a single sclerite, whereas the second, third, and fourth tergites are each divided into at least four sclerites. The fifth tergite features an entire median sclerite. The setae on the tergites are shaped like bristles or spears. The sternum of the pygidium features two pairs of setae, one anterior and one posterior.

MacSwain and Lanham also described two other new genera in the family Brachypauropodidae, Zygopauropus and Deltopauropus, along with Aletopauropus, finding no more than eight pairs of legs in all three genera. Since then, the genus Deltopauropus has been found to include adults with the usual nine leg pairs, but no adults with more than eight leg pairs have been found in the genera Aletopauropus and Zygopauropus. Since the descriptions of Aletopauropus and Zygopauropus by MacSwain and Lanham, adults in only two other genera of pauropods, Amphipauropus and Cauvetauropus, have been found to have no more than eight leg pairs.

Pauropods in the genus Aletopauropus share several traits with other pauropods in the family Brachypauropodidae. These traits include not only an entire first tergite followed by second and third tergites that are each divided into at least four parts but also a pygidial sternum with at least two pairs of setae. The genus Aletopauropus shares an especially extensive set of traits with the genus Zygopauropus, the only other genus in the family Brachypauropodidae in which adults have only eight leg pairs. For example, both of these genera have temporal organs with tube-like extensions and only two pairs of setae on the pygidial sternum.

Pauropods in the genus Aletopauropus can be distinguished from those in the genus Zygopauropus based on other traits. For example, the fifth tergite in Zygopauropus is divided down the middle longitudinally into two sclerites, whereas this tergite in Aletopauropus features an entire sclerite in the middle. Furthermore, the head features three rows of setae in Aletopauropus but four rows of setae in Zygopauropus.

The two species of Aletopauropus can be distinguished from one another based on another set of traits. For example, all the sclerites of the tergites are reticulated in A. tanakai but not in A. lentus. Furthermore, the middle of the posterior margin of the pygidial sternum features a distinct rounded bulge in A. tanakai but not in A. lentus. Moreover, the styli (fourth pair of posterior setae) on the posterior margin of the pygidial tergum are nearly cylindrical rods in A. lentus but tapering in A. tanakai.
