= Devillea tuberculata =

Scientific classification
- Kingdom: Animalia
- Phylum: Arthropoda
- Subphylum: Myriapoda
- Class: Diplopoda
- Order: Polydesmida
- Family: Xystodesmidae
- Genus: Devillea
- Species: D. tuberculata

Binomial name
- Devillea tuberculata Brölemann, 1902

Species of millipede

Devilliea tuberculata is a species of flat-backed millipedes in the family Xystodesmidae. Like other members of the genus Devillea, this species is limited to caves. This millipede has been found in several caves in the Alpes-Maritimes department of France. This species is notable as the first millipede in the order Polydesmida found to feature more than the 20 segments (counting the collum as the first segment and the telson as the last) usually found in this order.

== Discovery ==
The French myriapodologist Henri W. Brölemann first described this species in 1902 as the type species for the newly created genus Devilliea. The original descriptions of this genus and this species are based on multiple specimens, including both adult and immature specimens of each sex, collected from caves near Tourettes-sur-Loup and in Saint-Jeannet near Vence, both in the Provence-Alpes-Côte d’Azur region of southern France in the Maritime Alps. Brölemann named the genus Devillea for M.J. Sainte-Claire Deville, who collected these specimens.

== Description ==
Adult males of this species have 21 segments, and adult females have 22. The adult female has two more segments and consequently four more pairs of legs than usually observed in the order Polydesmida. Thus, the adult female has 35 leg pairs. The adult male has one more segment and two more leg pairs than usual for this order. Thus, the adult male has 32 leg pairs (excluding the eighth pair, which becomes a pair of gonopods). Little is known about the post-embryonic development of millipedes in this species, but authorities believe that this species goes through the stages of anamorphosis usually observed in the order Polydesmida, then reaches a greater number of segments through additional molts, adding one segment per molt.

Like other members of the genus Devillea, this species is very small and features an exoskeleton highly sculptured with tubercles. This species has no pigmentation and reaches only 8 mm in length and 0.6 mm in width. The head is very broad and densely covered with setae. The antennae are short and slightly clavate, and the legs are also quite short.

The body segments resemble a string of beads. The collum is narrower than the head, only slightly more than half as wide, and features eleven tubercles: two pairs on the anterior margin, a pair in each corner of the posterior margin (each pair including one larger and one smaller tubercle), and three small tubercles on the posterior margin. The tergites of the second, third, and fourth segments each feature four large tubercles in a transverse row. The internal pair are simple, conical, and rounded. The outer pair are more cylindrical and are crowned with three or four protuberances. An outer pair of tubercles appear on all segments but the last. Starting with the fifth segment, each segment in front of the telson features two pairs of less prominent dorsal tubercles, one pair behind the other, as well as the outer pair of tubercles.

The sternites are long and narrow and feature cross-shaped depressions in which the transverse groove is deeper. The telson is narrower than the penultimate segment and gradually narrows to a truncated tip. The dorsal surface of the telson has no large tubercles, instead featuring several pairs of smaller protuberances crowned with setae.

This millipede can be distinguished from other species in the same genus based on the distribution of tubercles on the tergites. For example, D. tuberculata features a second pair of dorsal tubercles starting with the fifth segment, but this second pair appears starting with the sixth segment in D. cerruti and the nineteenth segment in D. patrizii, whereas in D. doderoi and D. subterranea, all tergites feature this second pair of tubercles. In D. sanctijohannis, all tergites starting with the fifth segment feature both pairs of dorsal tubercles, but the second, third, and fourth segments lack the anterior pair. Furthermore, the collum features eleven tubercles in D. tuberculata and D. patrizii but only ten tubercles in D. doderoi and D. sanctijohannis and only eight tubercles in D. cerruti and D. subterranea.
