= Entomobielziidae =

Scientific classification
- Kingdom: Animalia
- Phylum: Arthropoda
- Subphylum: Myriapoda
- Class: Diplopoda
- Order: Chordeumatida
- Superfamily: Cleidogonoidea
- Family: Entomobielziidae

Family of millipedes

Entomobielziidae is a family of millipedes belonging to the order Chordeumatida. This family includes 18 species, including 13 in the genus Tianella. Millipedes in this family are found in Romania, central Asia, and the Himalayas.

== Description ==
Millipedes in this family feature highly reduced paranota. The posterior gonopods are leglike, usually with five segments and a claw. This family includes the genus Tianella, notable for featuring adult millipedes with 29 segments, a number not found in the adults of any other chordeumatidan genus. Adults in most Tianella species have 29 segments.

== Genera ==
This family includes three genera:

- Entomobielzia Verhoeff, 1898
- Pseudoclis Attems, 1899
- Tianella Attems, 1904
