= Devillea (millipede) =

Scientific classification
- Domain: Eukaryota
- Kingdom: Animalia
- Phylum: Arthropoda
- Subphylum: Myriapoda
- Class: Diplopoda
- Order: Polydesmida
- Family: Xystodesmidae
- Genus: Devillea; Brölemann, 1902

Type species
- Devillea tuberculata Brölemann, 1902

Genus of millipedes

Devillea is a genus of flat-backed millipedes in the family Xystodesmidae. These millipedes are rare and limited to caves. Species in this genus are found in Sardinia, Capri, and southern France in the Maritime Alps. These species are notable for featuring more than the 20 segments (counting the collum as the first segment and the telson as the last) usually found in the order Polydesmida. This genus is one of only two genera in this order to feature these extra segments and the first such genus to be discovered.

== Discovery ==
The French myriapodologist Henri W. Brölemann created this genus to contain the newly discovered type species D. tuberculata in 1902. The original descriptions of this genus and this species are based on multiple specimens of each sex collected from caves near Tourettes-sur-Loup and in Saint-Jeannet near Vence, both in the Provence-Alpes-Côte d’Azur region of southern France in the Maritime Alps. Brölemann named this genus for M.J. Sainte-Claire Deville, who collected these specimens.

== Description ==
Millipedes in this genus feature exoskeletons that are highly sculptured with tubercles. Species in this genus are small, usually less than 10 mm long. The type species D. tuberculata, for example, reaches only 8 mm in length. The second species in this genus to be discovered, D. doderoi, described in 1903 based on a male specimen found in Sardinia, measures only 8 mm in length. The species D. cerrutii and D. patrizii, described in 1956 based on specimens (including only one adult of each species, both female) found in Sardinia, reach 10 mm and 7 mm in length, respectively.

The most striking characteristic of this genus, however, is the number of segments. Each species of Devillea features more than the 20 segments (that is, 19 rings plus the telson) typically observed in flat-backed millipedes. In the type species D. tuberculata, adult males have 21 segments, and adult females have 22, with a corresponding increase in the number of leg pairs (32 in adult males, excluding one pair of gonopods, and 35 in adult females). The species D. cerrutii and D. patrizii also feature 22 segments in females. Some species in this genus also exhibit variation in segment number within the same sex. For example, in D. subterranea, described in 1943 based on specimens from Capri, adult males can have as few as 19 segments or as many as 23. Similarly, in the species D. sanctijohannis, originally described in 1974 as a subspecies of D. doderoi based on specimens found in Sardinia, adult males can have 19 to 22 segments, and adult females can have 20 to 24 segments. The species D. doderoi represents the most extreme example, ranging from 25 to as many as 29 segments, the maximum number recorded in this genus.

== Development ==
Little is known about the post-embryonic development of millipedes in this genus. For example, some species in this genus may be euanamorphic; that is, they may continue to molt and add an indefinite number of segments as adults. Authorities believe that species in this genus go through the stages of anamorphosis usually observed in the order Polydesmida, then reach a greater number of segments through additional molts, adding one segment per molt.

== Species ==
This genus includes six species:

- Devillea cerrutii Manfredi, 1956
- Devillea doderoi Silvestri, 1903
- Devillea patrizii Manfredi, 1956
- Devillea sanctijohannis Strasser, 1974
- Devillea subterranea Verhoeff, 1943
- Devillea tuberculata Brölemann, 1902
