= Lipseuma =

Scientific classification
- Kingdom: Animalia
- Phylum: Arthropoda
- Subphylum: Myriapoda
- Class: Diplopoda
- Order: Chordeumatida
- Family: Kashmireumatidae
- Genus: Lipseuma; Golovatch, Geoffroy & Mauries, 2006

Type species
- Lipseuma josianae Golovatch, Geoffroy & Mauries, 2006

Species
- Lipseuma bernardi; Lipseuma josianae

Genus of millipedes

Lipseuma is a genus of millipedes in the family Kashmireumatidae. This genus contains only two species, the type species L. josianae and its close relative L. bernardi. Both species are troglobites found in caves in China. The species in this genus are notable for featuring gonopods that are among the simplest in the order Chordeumatida.

== Discovery and distribution ==
This genus and its two species were first described in 2006 by the myriapodologist Sergei Golovatch of the Russian Academy of Sciences and two myriapodologists at the Muséum National d’Histoire Naturelle in France, Jean-Jacques Geoffroy and Jean-Paul Mauriès. The original descriptions are based on specimens collected in 1999 by the biospeleologists Josiane and Bernard Lips, for whom the genus and its two species are named. The L. josianae holotype (a male) and seven paratypes (two males, one female, and four juveniles) were found in the Chuan Dong Zi cave in Banqiao in Hubei province in China. The L. bernardi holotype (a male) and two paratypes (one incomplete male and one subadult male) were found in the Three Eyes cave in Xinlong county in Sichuan province in China. All type specimens are deposited in the Muséum National d’Histoire Naturelle in Paris. Josiane Lips collected five more specimens of L. bernardi (three males and two females) from the Three Eyes cave in 2004.

== Description ==
Both species in this genus are striking for the complete lack of pigment and the absence of eyes. These species also feature strongly elongated antennae, legs, and bristles on the outside of their bodies. These troglomorphic adaptations to life in the dark indicate that both species are troglobites, living their entire life cycles in caves.

As in most species in the family Kashireumatidae (all three species of Kashmireuma and two of three species of Vieteuma), the adults of both species of Lipseuma have only 28 segments (counting the collum as the first segment and the telson as the last) rather than the 30 segments usually found in adults the order Chordeumatida. Thus, in this genus, the adult female has only 46 pairs of legs, and the adult male has only 44 pairs of walking legs, excluding the eighth and ninth pair, which become anterior and posterior gonopods. Like other males in the family Kashmireumatidae, males in the geunus Lipseuma feature simple posterior gonopods, but the posterior gonopods in this genus are unusually simple. For example, the posterior gonopods in this genus feature only one segment where two or three segments are visible in the other two genera in this family. Furthermore, the anterior gonopods are complex in the other genera in this family but simple in this genus. For example, where the anterior gonopods in this genus features an undivided colpocoxite, the other genera feature a pair of colpocoxites that are either fully or partly independent.

This genus can also be distinguished from the other two genera in this family based on other traits. For example, the sixth leg pair in males of this genus is markedly swollen compared to any other leg pair. Males in the other genera feature either normal or only moderately swollen legs from the third leg pair through the seventh leg pair. Furthermore, the cyphopods in females are short and broad in this genus but elongate in the other genera in this family.

The two Lipseuma species are so similar as to be difficult to distinguish. The two species differ slightly in size: Male specimens of L. josianae range from 9.3 mm to 9.8 mm in length, while the only female specimen measures 10.1 mm long. The male specimens of L. bernardi are smaller, ranging from 6.8 mm (in the subadult) to 7.2 mm in length.

The two species in this genus also differ in minor details of the structure of their legs and posterior gonopods. For example, the middle of the tarsus on the seventh leg pair in L. bernardi features a distinctive protuberance on the ventral surface, but this protuberance is absent in L. josianae. Furthermore, the distal part of the rear face on each of the posterior gonopods in L. bernardi show some trace of a second segment, but no such vestiges are visible on these gonopods in L. josianae.
