= Mecistocephalus smithii =

Scientific classification
- Kingdom: Animalia
- Phylum: Arthropoda
- Subphylum: Myriapoda
- Class: Chilopoda
- Order: Geophilomorpha
- Family: Mecistocephalidae
- Genus: Mecistocephalus
- Species: M. smithii

Binomial name
- Mecistocephalus smithii Pocock, 1895

Species of centipede

Mecistocephalus smithii is a species of soil centipede in the family Mecistocephalidae. This centipede is notable for featuring 59 pairs of legs rather than the 49 leg pairs usually observed in the genus Mecistocephalus. This centipede is one of only a few species in the genus Mecistocephalus or in the family Mecistocephalidae with more than 55 leg pairs. This centipede is also notable as the first Mecistocephalus species discovered in China.

== Discovery and distribution ==
This species was first described in 1895 by the British zoologist Reginald I. Pocock. He based the original description of this species on specimens collected from two localities near the city of Ningbo in Zhejiang province in China. Type material including two specimens is preserved at the Natural History Museum in London.

Since the original description, more specimens assigned to this species were recorded in Japan and Taiwan. Authorities have since cast doubt on these records, however, suggesting that these centipedes were actually specimens of a similar species, M. diversisternus, mistakenly identified as specimens of M. smithii. The species M. diversisternus can have either 57 or 59 pairs of legs.

More recently, M. smithii has been described in greater detail based on thirteen specimens (nine females and four males) collected in 2019 and 2020 from four different sites in China, including one near the type locality. These specimens were found not only on Zhoushan Island in Zhejiang province and in Nanjing in Jiangsu province but also in Guangzhou and at the Xinfengjiang Reservoir in Heyuan, both sites in Guangdong province. These more recent specimens confirmed the presence of this species in China.

== Phylogeny ==
A phylogenetic analysis of ten Mecistocephalus species based on molecular data not only places M. smithii in a clade with M. guildingii, which emerges as the closest relative of M. smithii in a phylogenetic tree, but also places the species M. diversisternus in a sister group for this clade. The species M. guildingii is found in China as well as the Americas and western Africa. The closely related M. diversisternus is found in Taiwan and Japan and is similar enough to M. smithii for specimens of M. diversisternus to be mistakenly identified as specimens of M. smithii.

== Description ==
The species M. smithii has 59 pairs of legs in each sex and ranges from 7.4 cm to 8.8 cm in length. The body is yellow, but the head and forcipular segment are dark red. The head is longer than wide, with a length/width ratio ranging from 1.7 to 2.1. The head features a transverse suture, and the pleurite on each side of the head features a spiculum but no setae. The antennae are 5.3 times as long as the head is wide. Each side of the clypeus features 20 to 22 setae, and the forcipular segment features a pair of setae on each side. The first article of the forcipule features two teeth, the second and third articles each feature one tooth, and the ultimate article features a small basal tooth that is dark brown. The first pair of legs are much smaller than the other legs. The sternites on the anterior leg-bearing segments feature a forked furrow with short branches. The ultimate legs lack claws.

This species exhibits many traits shared with other Mecistocephalus species. For example, like other centipedes in the same genus, this species features an elongated head with spicula. Furthermore, the first article of the forcipule in this species also features two teeth, and the first pair of legs are markedly reduced in size.

This species shares a more distinctive set of traits with its close relative M. guildingii. For example, both of these species feature a forked furrow on the sternites on the anterior leg-bearing segments. These two species can be distinguished, however, based on other traits. For example, M. guildingii not only has fewer legs (only 49 pairs) than M. smithii but also is much smaller in size, reaching only about 4 cm in length. Furthermore, M. guildingii features setae on the posterior half of the cephalic pleurites, whereas such setae are absent in M. smithii. Moreover, M. smithii features a pair of setae on each side of the forcipular segment, whereas these setae are absent in M. guildingii.

The species M. smithii also shares many distinctive traits with its close relative M. diversisternus. For example, these centipedes are the only two Mecistocephalus species in Asia to include specimens with 59 leg pairs. Furthermore, the cephalic pleurites in both species lack setae. These two species can be distinguished, however, based on other traits. For example, the side of the clypeus in M. smithii features 20 to 22 setae where M. diversisternus features only three or four. Furthermore, the furrow on the sternites on the anterior leg-bearing segments in M. smithii is forked, whereas the sternal furrow in M. diversisternus is not forked. Moreover, M. diversisternus is also smaller, ranging from 2.5 cm to 5.5 cm in length.
