= Tianella =

Scientific classification
- Kingdom: Animalia
- Phylum: Arthropoda
- Subphylum: Myriapoda
- Class: Diplopoda
- Order: Chordeumatida
- Family: Entomobielziidae
- Genus: Tianella; Attems, 1904

Type species
- Tianella fastigata Attems, 1904

Genus of millipedes

Tianella is a genus of millipedes in the family Entomobielziidae. This genus includes eleven species found in Nepal, one species found in Kazakhstan, and one species found in Kyrgyzstan. This genus is notable for including the only species in the order Chordeumatida with 29 segments (counting the collum as the first segment and the telson as the last) in adults. Most species in this genus have 29 segments in adults rather than the 30 segments usually observed in this order.

== Discovery ==
This genus was first described by the Austrian myriapodologist Carl Attems in 1904 to contain the newly discovered type species T. fastigata, found in Kyrgyzstan. He described this genus as having the usual 30 segments. The American zoologist William A. Shear described three more species in this genus in 1979, T. bobanga, T. lughla, and T. martensi, all found in Nepal, maintaining the original description of this genus as having 30 segments. In 1979, the Russian myriapodologist Sergei I. Golovatch of the Academy of Sciences of the Soviet Union described another species in this genus, T. ornata, found in Kazakhstan. Golovatch originally described T. ornata as having 30 segments.

In 1987, Shear described another four species in this genus, all found in Nepal. He found that the smaller two species, T. daamsae and T. mananga, have only 28 segments as adults, and the larger two, T. ausobskyi and T. gitanga, have 29 segments as adults, a number never recorded before in the order Chordeumatida. In 1988, the French myriapodologist Jean-Paul Mauriès of the Muséum National d'Histoire Naturelle in Paris described another four species, T. jaljalensis, T. katmandua, T. mangsingma, and T. smetanai, all found in Nepal and all featuring only 29 segments as adults.

Furthermore, Mauriès reports that Golovatch reexamined the type specimens of T. ornata and found that adults of that species have 29 segments rather than the 30 segments reported in the original description. Mauriès also examined the type specimens of T. martensi and found them to have 29 segments rather than the 30 segments indicated by the original description by Shear. Mauriès found the holotype of T. fastigata to be too poorly preserved to determine the number of segments and did not examine any specimens of T. bobanga or T. lughla, but he suspects that these species also have 29 segments rather than the 30 segments indicated by the original descriptions. Thus, at least eight Tianella species have 29 segments as adults, two have 28 segments, and the other three were originally described as having 30 segments but may have 29 segments instead.

== Description ==
These millipedes range from 5.2 mm long in the smallest species (T. daamsae) to 13.3 mm long in the largest species (T. ornata). Adults in most species in this genus have 29 segments, and the females of these species have 48 pairs of legs. In males, the eight leg pair is significantly reduced and modified to form the anterior gonopods, and the ninth leg pair become posterior gonopods. Thus, in species with 29 segments, adult males have 46 pairs of walking legs, excluding these two pairs of gonopods. In species with 28 segments, adult females have 46 pairs of legs, and adult males have 44 pairs of walking legs, excluding two pairs of gonopods.

The anterior gonopods appear complex in this genus, with several bundles of long hairs or thin strips. The basal (coxal) elements of these gonopods are separated down the center into distinct left and right parts. These coxal elements include angiocoxal parts on each side in front and a significantly larger colpocoxal part, which takes the form of rounded masses toward the rear.

== Development ==
Species in this genus arrive at a lower number of segments and legs through a process of post-embryonic development that deviates from the anamorphosis usually observed in the order Chordeumatida. Like other species in this order, those in the genus Tianella are teloanamorphic, adding segments and legs through a series of molts until the adult stage, when the molting stops and the adult emerges with a final number of segments and legs. The available evidence seems to suggest that Tianella species with 29 segments may go through nine stages, as most chordeumatidans do, but add one segment fewer than usual upon entering the seventh stage, leaving these species with one segment fewer than usual in the eighth stage and in the ninth and final stage.

Mauriès found juveniles from four Tianella species representing at least four different stages of development. The earliest stage found in this sample, with 15 segments and 16 leg pairs, matches the fourth stage of development usually observed in chordeumatidans, and another stage found, with 23 segments and 32 leg pairs, matches the sixth stage usually observed. The next stage in this Tianella sample, however, with only 25 segments and 38 leg pairs, has one segment and two leg pairs fewer than usually observed in the seventh stage in chordeumatidans. In the next (and penultimate) stage of development in this Tianella sample, this difference persists, with only 27 segments and 44 leg pairs (rather than the 28 segments and 46 leg pairs usually observed in the eighth stage). Finally, this difference continues into the adult stage in most Tianella species, with only 29 segments and 48 leg pairs (rather than the 30 segments and 50 leg pairs usually observed in the ninth stage).

== Species ==
This genus includes 13 species:

- Tianella ausobskyi Shear, 1987
- Tianella bobanga Shear, 1979
- Tianella daamsae Shear, 1987
- Tianella fastigata Attems, 1904
- Tianella gitanga Shear, 1987
- Tianella jaljalensis Mauriès, 1988
- Tianella katmandua Mauriès, 1988
- Tianella lughla Shear, 1979
- Tianella mananga Shear, 1987
- Tianella mangsingma Mauriès, 1988
- Tianella martensi Shear, 1979
- Tianella ornata Golovatch, 1979
- Tianella smetanai Mauriès, 1988
