= Brachypauropodidae =

Scientific classification
- Kingdom: Animalia
- Phylum: Arthropoda
- Subphylum: Myriapoda
- Class: Pauropoda
- Order: Tetramerocerata
- Family: Brachypauropodidae; Silvestri, 1902

Family of many-legged arthropods

Brachypauropodidae is a family of pauropods in the order Tetramerocerata. This family has a nearly worldwide distribution. Pauropods in this family are found on all continents except South America and Antarctica.

== Description ==
Pauropods in this family feature an entire first tergite, but at least the next two tergites are each divided into four to six sclerites. The pygidial sternum has two or three pairs of setae. The middle of the posterior end of this sternum has only one anal plate attached. Like most adult pauropods in the order Tetramerocerata, most adults in this family have nine pairs of legs, but adults in two genera, Aletopauropus and Zygopauropus, have only eight pairs of legs. Each leg has five segments.

== Genera and distribution ==
This family includes 33 species distributed among the following seven genera:

- Aletopauropus MacSwain & Lanham, 1948
- Borneopauropus Scheller, 2008
- Brachypauropoides Remy, 1952
- Brachypauropus Latzel, 1884
- Deltapauropus MacSwain & Lanham, 1948
- Mojingapauropus Scheller, 2015
- Zygopauropus MacSwain & Lanham, 1948

The genus Brachypauropus is the largest in this family, with 11 species, which are found in the Nearctic realm (in the United States) and Palearctic realm (in Great Britain, Spain, France, Germany, Switzerland, Italy, Austria, Poland, Romania, Greece, and Japan). The genera Brachypauropoides and Borneopauropus are smaller, each with seven species. Species in the genus Brachypauropoides are found in the Afrotropical realm (in Madagascar) and Australasian realm (in New Zealand). Species in the genus Borneopauropus are found in the Indomalayan realm (in Indonesia and Sabah) and Australasian realm (in Tasmania and New Zealand). The genus Deltapauropus includes only four species, which are limited to the Nearctic realm (in the United States) and Palearctic realm (in Japan). The genus Aletopauropus includes only two species, with one in the Nearctic realm (in California) and the other in the Palearctic realm (in Japan). The other two genera are monotypic and have limited distributions, with Zygopauropus in the Nearctic realm (in California) and Mojingapauropus in the Neotropical realm (in Panama).
