= Zygopauropus =

Scientific classification
- Kingdom: Animalia
- Phylum: Arthropoda
- Subphylum: Myriapoda
- Class: Pauropoda
- Order: Tetramerocerata
- Family: Brachypauropodidae
- Genus: Zygopauropus; MacSwain & Lanham, 1948
- Species: Z. hesperius

Binomial name
- Zygopauropus hesperius MacSwain & Lanham, 1948

Genus of pauropod

Zygopauropus is a monotypic genus of pauropod in the family Brachypauropodidae. The only species in this genus is Zygopauropus hesperius, which is found in California. This genus is notable as one of only four genera of pauropods in which adults have only eight pairs of legs rather than the nine leg pairs usually found in adults in the order Tetramerocerata. Before the discovery of Zygopauropus, adult pauropods were thought to have only nine or (rarely) ten pairs of legs.

== Discovery ==
The genus Zygopauropus and its type species Z. hesperius were first described in 1948 by the zoologists John W. MacSwain and Urless N. Lanham of the University of California at Berkeley. MacSwain and Lanham based their descriptions on twelve specimens that they collected in 1947. These specimens include a male holotype, a female allotype, four paratypes (one male and three females), and four juveniles representing the first three stages of post-embryonic development, all found on the south slopes of Mount Diablo in Contra Costa county in California. MacSwain and Lanham also found two adult male specimens in the town of Fairfax in Marin county in California.

== Description ==
This pauropod is small and white: the adult male holotype measures only 0.54 mm in length and 0.17 mm in width, and the adult female allotype measures only 0.56 mm in length and 0.20 mm in width. This species features a head with four transverse rows of setae. Three tube-like extensions (one anterior, one median, and one posterior) protrude from the temporal organ on each side of the head.

Adults have only eight pairs of legs, and each leg has five segments. These pauropods go through the first four stages of post-embryonic development typical of species in the order Tetramerocerata, with three leg pairs in the first stage, five pairs in the second, six pairs in the third, and eight pairs in the fourth, but reach sexual maturity in the fourth stage rather than in a fifth stage and do not add the ninth pair of legs that usually appear in a fifth stage for other species in this order. Thus, adults of this species also have only eleven trunk segments and five tergites and do not acquire the twelfth trunk segment and sixth tergite that other species in this order usually add in a fifth stage.

The first tergite is entire, with a single sclerite featuring four pairs of setae. The second, third, and fourth tergites are each divided both transversely and longitudinally, with each quadrant featuring a pair of setae. The fifth tergite is divided longitudinally into two sclerites, each with five setae. The setae on the tergites are bristle-shaped or slightly hastate; these setae bend near the base to point toward the posterior. The sternum of the pygidium features two pairs of setae, one anterior and one posterior.

MacSwain and Lanham also described two other new genera in the family Brachypauropodidae, Aletopauropus and Deltopauropus, along with Zygopauropus, finding no more than eight pairs of legs in all three genera. Since then, the genus Deltopauropus has been found to include adults with the usual nine leg pairs, but no adults with more than eight leg pairs have been found in the genera Zygopauropus and Aletopauropus. Since the descriptions of Zygopauropus and Aletopauropus by MacSwain and Lanham, adults in only two other genera of pauropods, Amphipauropus and Cauvetauropus, have been found to have no more than eight leg pairs.

Pauropods in the genus Zygopauropus share several traits with other pauropods in the family Brachypauropodidae. These traits include not only an entire first tergite followed by second and third tergites that are each divided into at least four parts but also a pygidial sternum with at least two pairs of setae. The genus Zygopauropus shares an especially extensive set of traits with the genus Aletopauropus, the only other genus in the family Brachypauropodidae in which adults have only eight leg pairs. For example, both genera have only two pairs of setae on the pygidial sternum, bristle-shaped or hastate setae bent posteriorly near the base on the tergites, and temporal organs with tube-like extensions.

Pauropods in the genus Zygopauropus can be distinguished from those in the genus Aletopauropus based on other traits. For example, the fifth tergite in Zygopauropus is divided down the middle longitudinally into two sclerites, whereas this tergite in Aletopauropus features an entire sclerite in the middle. Furthermore, the head features four rows of setae in Zygopauropus but only three rows of setae in Aletopauropus.
