= Kashmireumatidae =

Scientific classification
- Domain: Eukaryota
- Kingdom: Animalia
- Phylum: Arthropoda
- Subphylum: Myriapoda
- Class: Diplopoda
- Order: Chordeumatida
- Superfamily: Brannerioidea
- Family: Kashmireumatidae

Family of millipedes

Kashmireumatidae is a family of millipedes belonging to the order Chordeumatida. This family includes eight species distributed among three genera. These millipedes are found in India, Nepal, China, and Vietnam.

== Description ==
These millipedes have nearly cylindrical bodies and range from 5mm to 14mm in length. The adult males in this family feature simple posterior gonopods. Adult millipedes in this family have only 26 or 28 segments (counting the collum as the first segment and the telson as the last) rather than the 30 segments usually found in this order. In the species Vieteuma topali, adults have 26 segments, whereas in all other species in this family, adults have 28 segments.

In some species (the genus Kashmireuma and the species V. longi), the second leg pair in the adult female is vestigial, but in all other species in this family (the genus Lipseuma and the species V. topali and V. hubeiensis), the adult female has a normal leg pair instead. Thus, in the genus Lipseuma, the adult female has 46 pairs of walking legs, as one would normally expect in an adult female chordeumatidan with 28 segments (two fewer segments than typically found in this order). In the genus Kashmireuma, however, adult females have the same 28 segments but only 45 pairs of walking legs, with a "platosternite" where a second pair of normal legs would otherwise be.

== Genera ==
This family includes the following genera:

- Kashmireuma Mauriès, 1982
- Lipseuma Golovatch, Geoffroy & Mauries, 2006
- Vieteuma Golovatch, 1984
