= Millotauropus =

Scientific classification
- Kingdom: Animalia
- Phylum: Arthropoda
- Subphylum: Myriapoda
- Class: Pauropoda
- Order: Hexamerocerata; Remy, 1950
- Family: Millotauropodidae; Remy, 1950
- Genus: Millotauropus; Remy, 1950

Synonyms
- Rosettauropus Hűther 1968

Genus of arthropods

Millotauropus is a genus of pauropods in the monotypic family Millotauropodidae in the monotypic order Hexamerocerata. The order Hexamerocerata includes only eight species and was created in 1950 to contain the newly discovered genus Millotauropus, which was found to have so many distinctive features as to warrant placement in a separate order. Before the discovery of Millotauropus, for example, pauropods were thought to have no more than ten leg pairs, but adults in the order Hexamerocerata have eleven pairs of legs. Although Millotauropus is the only described genus within Hexamerocerata, there may be another undescribed genus within a separate but related family.

== Description ==
Pauropods in the order Hexamerocerata are characterized by telescopic antennae with six stalk segments, unlike all other pauropods (those in the larger order Tetramerocerata), which have antennae that are not telescopic and have only four stalk segments as adults. Two antennal branches emerge from the distal end of the fourth segment in Tetramerocerata, one dorsal and one ventral; in Hexamerocerata, however, the dorsal branch emerges from the distal end of the fifth segment, and the ventral branch emerges from the distal end of the sixth segment. In Hexamerocerata, the sixth segment also features a sense organ shaped like a candelabra. In Hexamerocerata, each antennal branch features a long flagellum; in all other pauropods, however, the ventral branch features two flagella, whereas the dorsal branch features only one. The lateral sides of the head feature two large eye-like organs, and in Hexamerocerata, these temporal organs are shaped like cups or umbrellas attached to a shallow depression in the head; in all other pauropods, these organs are flat or somewhat convex.

Adults in the order Hexamerocerata feature a trunk with twelve entire tergites, whereas other adult pauropods have trunks with no more than six (entire or divided) tergites. The ventral surface of the first trunk segment, the collum, is smooth in Hexamerocerata; in all other pauropods, this surface features two appendages with a plate protruding in between. In Hexamerocerata, the tergum of the last trunk segment, the pygidium, features five to eight pairs of setae; this tergum in all other pauropods features only four pairs of setae. Adults in the order Hexamerocerata have eleven pairs of legs, whereas other adult pauropods have eight to ten leg pairs.

Pauropods in the order Hexamerocerata have tracheae, a feature absent in all other pauropods. These tracheae take the form of two thin tubes on each side running from the base of the first pair of legs and reaching into the posterior part of the head. The bases of the other legs in Hexamerocerata feature short rudiments of tracheae.

== Feeding ==
The mandibles in the order Hexamerocerata are strong enough to allow these pauropods to consume solid food. The midgut of these pauropods can contain fungus, spores, and plant tissue. The mouthparts in the order Tetramerocerata are weaker, with mandibles that are used to puncture cell walls so that the pauropod can suck out fluids. No solid food has been found in the midgut in Tetramerocerata.

== Development ==
Pauropods in the order Hexamerocerata go through a process of post-embryonic development that differs from that of most pauropods. Like most pauropods, those in this order go through five stages from the first instar to the adult. Juveniles in this order, however, begin with six pairs of legs and eight tergites and then become adults with eleven leg pairs and twelve tergites. Species in this order have six pairs of legs in the first stage, then eight pairs in the second, nine pairs in the third, ten pairs in the fourth, and finally eleven pairs in the fifth (adult) stage. Most other juvenile pauropods instead begin with three pairs of legs and three tergites, then become adults with nine leg pairs and six tergites, going through stages with three, five, six, eight, and nine pairs of legs.

== Distribution ==
The order Hexamerocerata has a mainly tropical distribution. These pauropods are found in the Neotropical realm (in Brazil) and the Afrotropical realm (in tropical continental Africa, Madagascar, and Seychelles). This order has also been recorded in the Palearctic realm (in Japan).

== Species ==
The order Hexamerocerata includes the following species:

- Millotauropus acostae Scheller, 1997
- Millotauropus angustiramosus Remy, 1955
- Millotauropus frustatorius Remy, 1959
- Millotauropus hebetisetosus Remy, 1953
- Millotauropus latiramosus Remy, 1953
- Millotauropus machadoi Remy, 1953
- Millotauropus silvestrii Remy, 1953
- Millotauropus temporalis (Hüther, 1968)
