= Dinogeophilus oligopodus =

Scientific classification
- Kingdom: Animalia
- Phylum: Arthropoda
- Subphylum: Myriapoda
- Class: Chilopoda
- Order: Geophilomorpha
- Family: Schendylidae
- Genus: Dinogeophilus
- Species: D. oligopodus

Binomial name
- Dinogeophilus oligopodus Pereira, 1984

Species of centipede

Dinogeophilus oligopodus is a species of soil centipede in the family Schendylidae. This centipede ranges from 4.5 to 5.5 mm in length, the smallest size recorded not only in the order Geophilomorpha but also in any epimorphic order of centipedes. This species is also notable as one of only six species in the order Geophilomorpha to feature only 29 pairs of legs and one of only two species to include females with only 29 pairs, the minimum number recorded for females in this order.

== Discovery and distribution ==
The zoologist Luis Alberto Pereira first described this species in 1984, based on five specimens collected near Puerto Iguazu, close to the Paraná river, in the Missiones province of Argentina. These specimens include a male holotype, three male paratypes, and one female allotype. These specimens were found in soil rich with humus, with leaf litter and abundant roots from jungle vegetation. Since the original description of D. oligopodus, Pereira and three biologists from the University of Padua (Lucio Bonato, Alessandro Minelli, and Leandro Drago) examined seven more specimens (two males and five females) collected from La Plata in Argentina. All twelve specimens are adults or at least subadults, based on an examination of the size and shape of the gonopods.

== Description ==
This species ranges from 4.5 to 5.5 mm in length, but most specimens are only 4.5 mm long. The male holotype measures 5 mm in length with a maximum width of 0.2 mm. Both males and females of this species have 29 pairs of legs. The body is whitish, but the head and forcipular segment are light yellow. The ultimate legs are markedly inflated compared to the other legs. The other legs each feature three accessory spines (one anterior spine and two posterior spines).

This species shares a distinctive set of features with Dinogeophius pauropus, the only other species in the genus Dinogeophilus. For example, both species have a single lamella on each mandible, second maxillae that are flattened and rounded at the distal end, incomplete chitin-lines on the sternum of the forcipular segment, forcipules with denticles along the intermediate part of the ultimate article, and a telson without anal pores. Furthermore, a longitudinally elongate elliptical cluster of pores appears on the ventral surface of each of the anterior leg-bearing segments after the first, but these pore-fields are limited to the anterior fourth of the trunk. Moreover, each of the ultimate legs features a single pore on the basal element (coxopleuron) and ends in a single tiny spine rather than a claw.

Based on a comparison with the only known specimen of D. pauropus (a male), the species D. oligopodus may be distinguished based on other traits. Whereas D. pauropus features tubercles on the surface of its most posterior leg-bearing segments, these tubercles are absent in D. oligopodus. These two species also feature different numbers of legs: Whereas D. oligopodus has 29 pairs of legs in each sex, D. pauropus has 31 leg pairs in the male specimen.

== Taxonomy and phylogeny ==
The Italian entomologist Filippo Silvestri originally described Dinogeophilus as a genus in the family Geophilidae in 1909. Authorities continued to regard this genus as a member of that family for more than a century, until Bonato, Minelli, Drago, and Pereira reassessed the phylogenetic position of this genus in 2015. Using new specimens collected by Pereira, scanning electron microscopy, and molecular data, Bonato and his colleagues placed this genus in the family Schendylidae instead. Analysis of the molecular evidence consistently found Dinogophilus nested among the Schendylidae in a phylogenetic tree.
