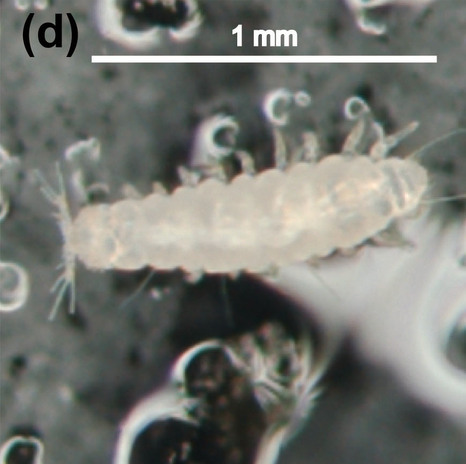
- An unidentified species under a microscope

Scientific classification
- Kingdom: Animalia
- Phylum: Arthropoda
- Subphylum: Myriapoda
- Class: Pauropoda
- Order: Tetramerocerata
- Family: Pauropodidae; Lubbock, 1867

= Pauropodidae =

Family of many-legged arthropods

Pauropodidae is a family of pauropods in the order Tetramerocerata. This group is the most diverse family of pauropods, containing 27 genera and more than 800 species. These pauropods usually live in the soil on mountains and hills.

Synonyms include Afrauropodidae Remy, 1959; Echinopauropus Remy, 1941; Parapauropus Remy, 1941; Pauropodinae Lubbock, 1867; Pauropopsis Remy, 1941; Polysphaeridiopus Remy, 1941; Pseudopauropus Remy, 1941; Scleropauropodidae Bagnall, 1935; and Silvestripus Remy, 1941.

== Description ==
Pauropods in this family are generally whitish and small, less than 2 mm in length. These pauropods feature a ventral antennal branch with one seta and one globulus (i.e., spheroid sense organ). The dorsal surface of the head features a single anterior seta and four transverse rows of setae.

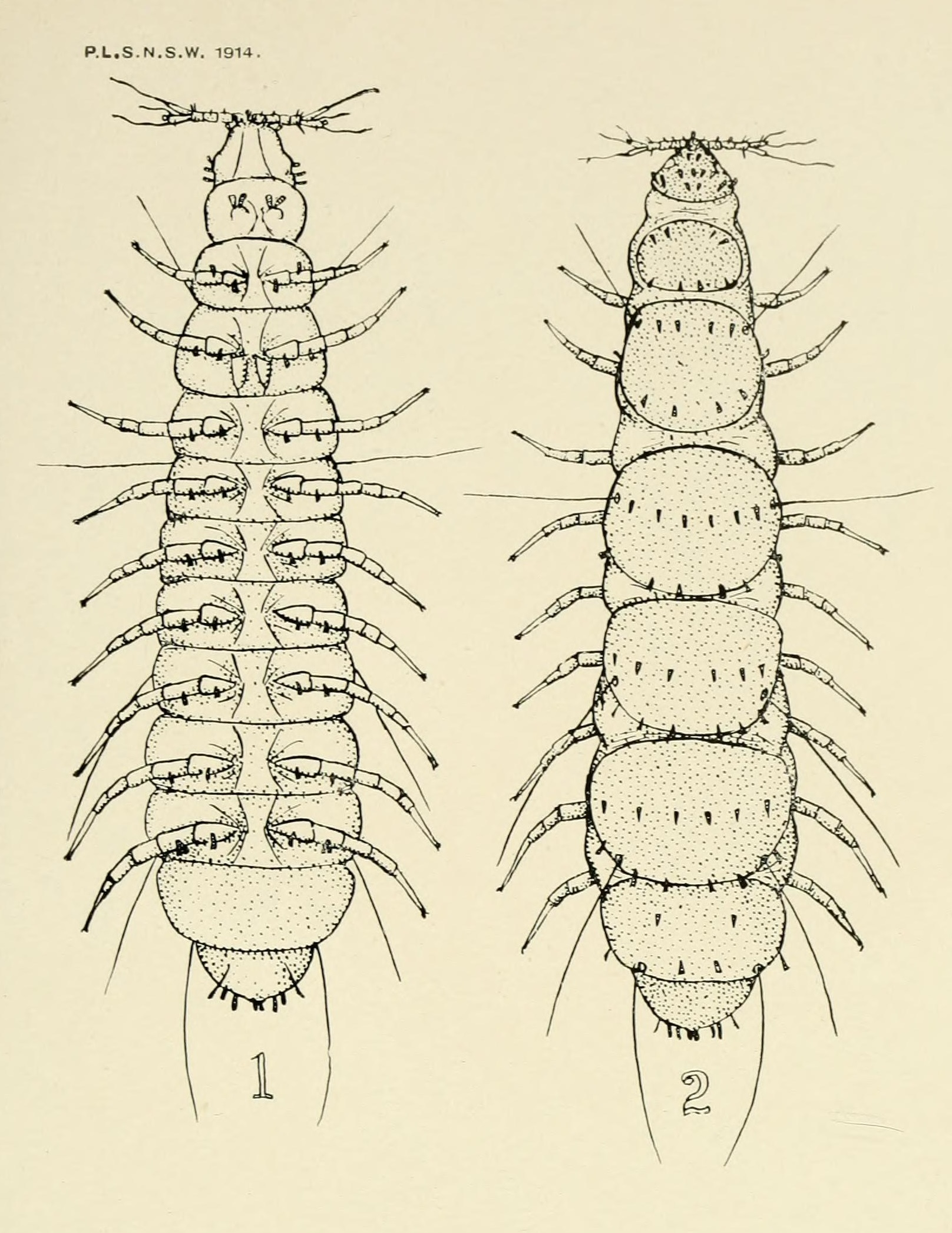
Pauropus amicus, ventral and dorsal views

The tergites are entire rather than divided into multiple sclerites. These tergites are weakly sclerotized, allowing many species in this family to curve their soft bodies in all directions. The setae on these tergites are arranged in regular transverse rows. The setae on the head and tergites are usually tapering or cylindrical. The middle of the posterior end of the sternum of the pygidium has only one anal plate attached.

Like most adult pauropods in the order Tetramerocerata, most adults in this family have nine pairs of legs, but adults in one genus, Cauvetauropus, have only eight pairs of legs, and female adults in another genus, Decapauropus, have nine or ten pairs of legs. The first and last pairs of legs have five segments. In most genera, the remaining legs have six segments instead, but in some genera, all legs may have five segments.

== Distribution ==
This family has a subcosmopolitan distribution. Species in this family are found worldwide, but not in Antarctica. Three genera in this family, Allopauropus, Decapauropus, and Pauropus, are especially widespread, each with a subcosmopolitan distribution.

== Fossil record ==
This family is notable for including the only known fossil pauropod, Eopauropus balticus. This pauropod was found in Baltic amber from the middle of the Eocene epoch. The discovery of a pauropod in amber is surprising, given that pauropods inhabit the soil, avoid the surface, and thus are rarely trapped in tree resin.

== Genera ==
This family includes 814 species distributed among 27 genera:

- Afrauropus Remy, 1959
- Allopauropus Silvestri, 1902
- Angkapauropus Scheller, 2011
- Ataktopauropus Scheller, 2012
- Cauvetauropus Remy, 1952
- Dasongius Sun & Guo, 2015
- Decapauropus Remy, 1931
- Desmopauropus Scheller, 2005
- Donzelotauropus Remy, 1957
- Eburnipauropus Scheller, 2008
- Ferepauropus Scheller, 2008
- Hemipauropus Silvestri, 1902
- Hystrichopauropus Remy, 1942
- Juxtapauropus Scheller, 2007
- Kionopauropus Scheller, 2009
- Monodauropus Remy, 1953
- Multipauropus Scheller, 1977
- Neopauropus Kishida, 1928
- Nesopauropus Scheller, 1997
- Pauropus Lubbock, 1867
- Perissopauropus Scheller, 1997
- Pounamupauropus Scheller, 2012
- Propepauropus Scheller, 1985
- Rabaudauropus Remy, 1953
- Scleropauropus Silvestri, 1902
- Stylopauropoides Remy, 1956
- Stylopauropus Cook, 1896
