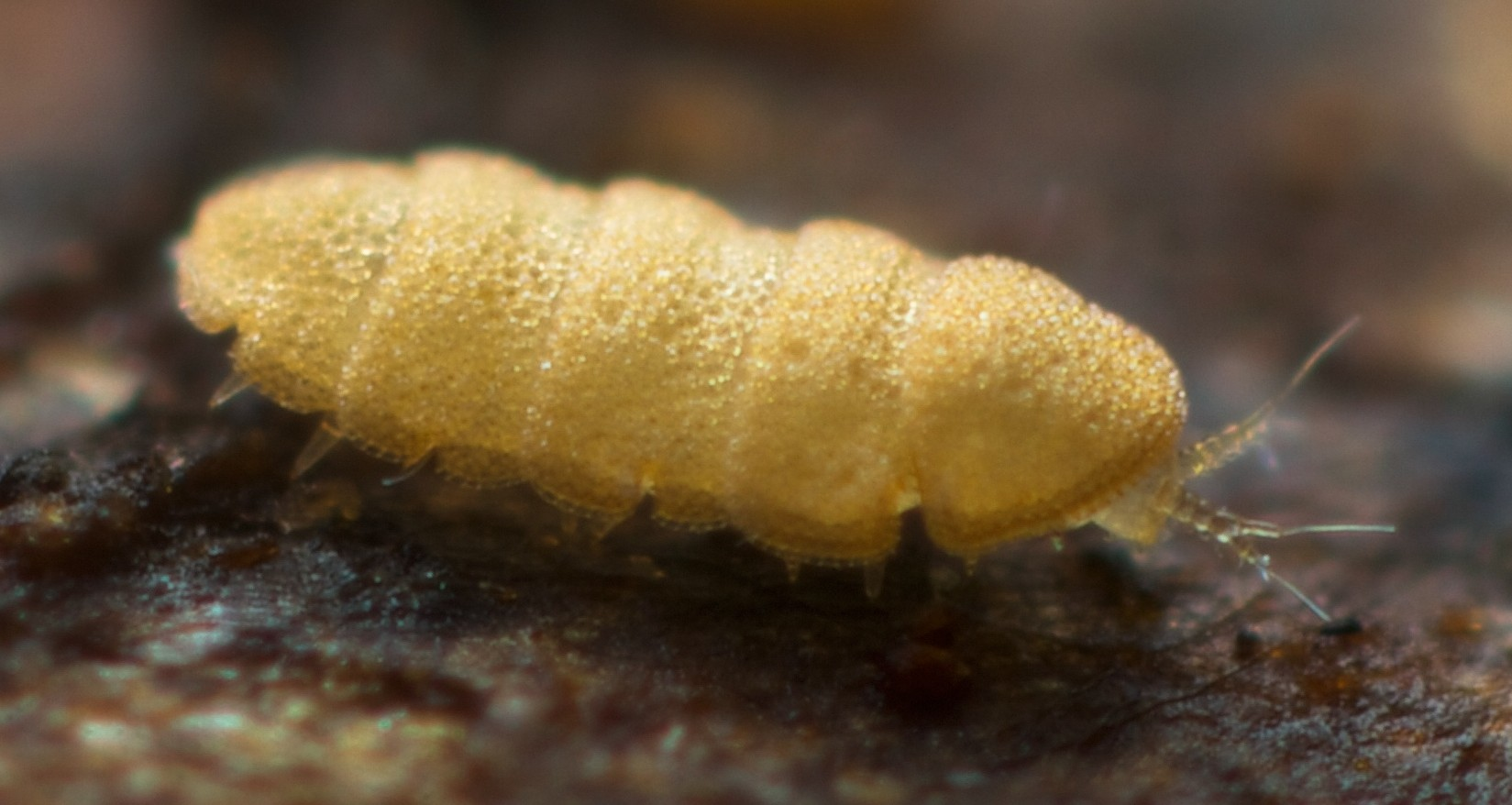
- A eurypauropod from New Zealand

Scientific classification
- Kingdom: Animalia
- Phylum: Arthropoda
- Subphylum: Myriapoda
- Class: Pauropoda

Orders
- Hexamerocerata; Tetramerocerata

Synonyms
- Heterognathes de Saussure & Humbert, 1872; Heterognatha Tömösváry, 1883; Monopoda Bollman, 1893

= Pauropoda =

Pauropoda Temporal range: 40–0 Ma Eocene to Present

Class of arthropods

Pauropoda is a class of small, pale, millipede-like arthropods in the subphylum Myriapoda. More than 900 species in twelve families are found worldwide, living in soil and leaf mold. Pauropods look like centipedes or millipedes and may be a sister group of the latter, but a close relationship with Symphyla has also been posited. The name Pauropoda derives from the Greek pauros (meaning "small" or "few") and pous, genitive podos (meaning "foot"), because most species in this class have only nine pairs of legs as adults, a smaller number than those found among adults in any other class of myriapods.

== Anatomy ==
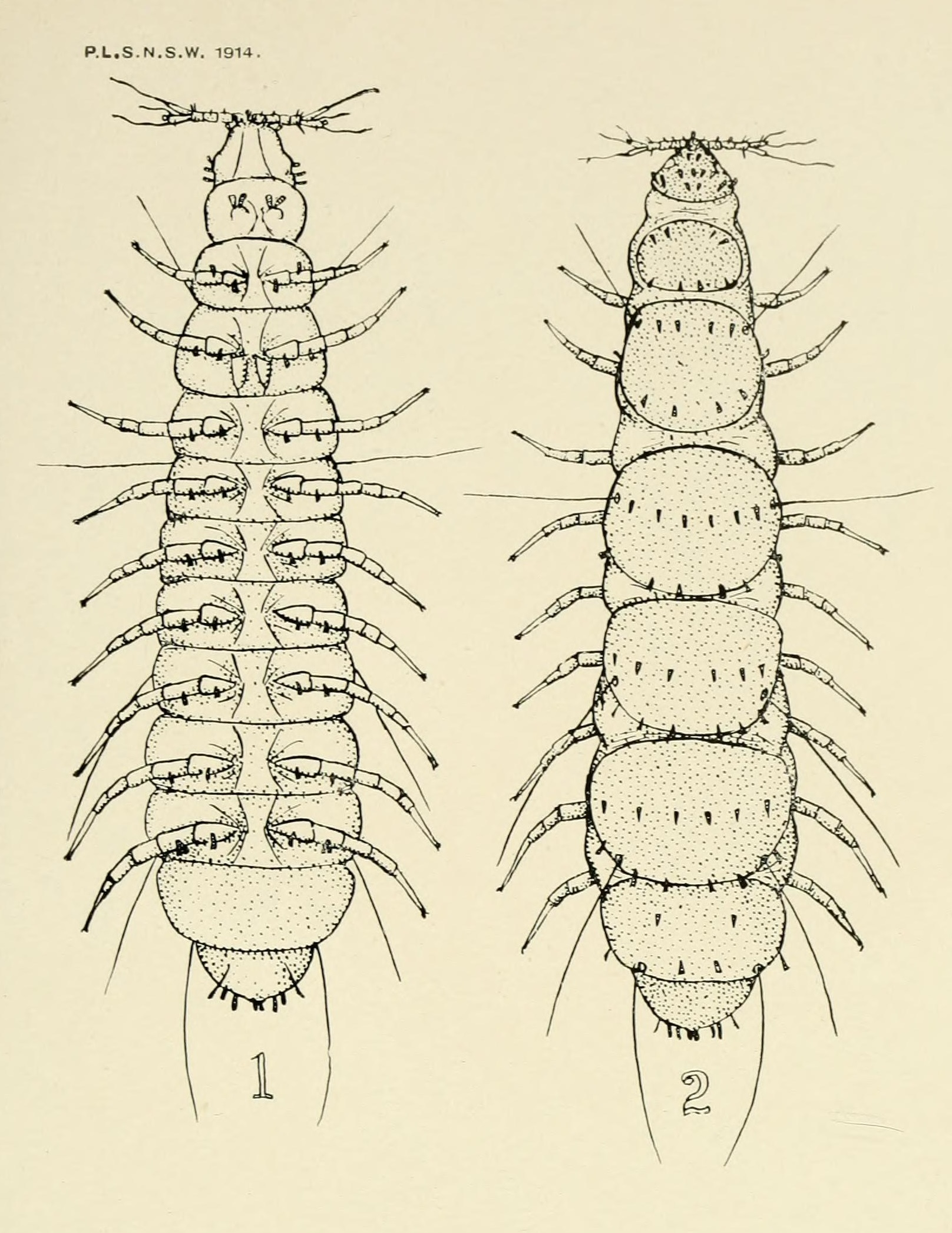
Ventral and dorsal views of Pauropus amicus from New South Wales, Australia.

Pauropods are soft, cylindrical animals with bodies measuring only 0.3 to 2 mm in length. They have neither eyes nor hearts, although they do have sensory organs which can detect light. The body segments have ventral tracheal/spiracular pouches forming apodemes similar to those in millipedes and Symphyla, although the trachea usually connected to these structures are absent in most species. There are five pairs of long sensory hairs (trichobothria) located throughout the body segments. Pauropods can be identified because of their distinctive anal plate, which is unique to pauropods. Different species of pauropods can be identified based on the size and shape of their anal plate. The antennae are branching, biramous, and segmented, which is distinctive for the group. Pauropods are usually either white or brown.

== Discovery ==
The first pauropod species to be discovered and described was Pauropus huxleyi, found by Lord Avebury in his own garden in London in 1866. He wrote of the creature:

Pauropus huxleyi is a bustling, active, neat and cleanly creature. It has, too, a look of cheerful intelligence, which forms a great contrast to the dull stupidity of the diplopods, or the melancholy ferocity of most chilopods.'

In 1870, Packard discovered a species of North American pauropod, extending the group's range.

== Evolution and systematics ==
Only one fossil species has been reported: Eopauropus balticus a prehistoric species of pauropod that was found in Baltic Amber.

Pauropods are divided into two orders: Hexamerocerata and Tetramerocerata. Hexamerocerata contains only one family, Millotauropodidae, with a single genus and only eight species. Tetramerocerata is much larger and more diverse, with eleven families, including Pauropodidae, Brachypauropodidae, and Eurypauropodidae. The family Pauropodidae is especially large, with 27 genera and 814 species, including most of the genera and species in the class Pauropoda.

Adults in the order Tetramerocerata have a scarcely telescopic antennal stalk with four segments, five or six tergites, and eight to ten pairs of legs. Pauropods in this order are small (sometimes quite small) and white or brownish. Most species have nine pairs of legs as adults, but adults in four genera (Cauvetauropus, Aletopauropus, Zygopauropus, and Amphipauropus) have only eight pairs of legs, and adult females in the genus Decapauropus have either nine or ten pairs of legs. The order Tetramerocerata has a subcosmopolitan distribution.

Pauropods in the order Hexamerocerata have a strongly telescopic antennal stalk with six segments. Adults in this order have twelve tergites and eleven pairs of legs. The pauropods in this order are white and relatively long and large. The order Hexamerocerata has a mainly tropical range.

== Reproduction and development ==
Pauropods, like all other myriapods, are gonochoric. Male pauropods place small packets of sperm on the ground, which the females use to impregnate themselves. The females then deposit the fertilized eggs on the ground. Parthogenesis can occur in some species, especially when environmental conditions are unfavourable.

The embryo goes through a short pupoid stage before the egg hatches and the first larval instar emerges. Juveniles then develop into adults through a series of molts, adding legs at each stage. Juveniles in the order Tetramerocerata start with three pairs of legs and progress through instars with five, then six, and then eight leg pairs, and in most species, become adults with nine leg pairs. In contrast, the first instar in the order Hexamerocerata has six leg pairs of legs and becomes an adult with eleven leg pairs. In at least some species in each order, adults continue to molt but no longer add legs or segments. This mode of development is known as hemianamorphosis.

== Behavior and diet ==
Paurapods have a distinctive method of movement characterized by bursts of speed and frequent changes of direction. Pauropods are shy of light and will attempt to distance themselves from it. Pauropods live in the soil, usually at densities of less than 100 per square metre (9/sq ft), and under debris and leaf litter. Pauropods occasionally migrate upwards or downwards throughout the soil based on moisture levels. They feed on mold, fungi, and occasionally even the root hairs of plants. As their bodies are too soft to be able to dig and burrow, pauropods follow roots and crevices in the soil, sometimes all the way down to the surface of the groundwater.

== Gallery ==
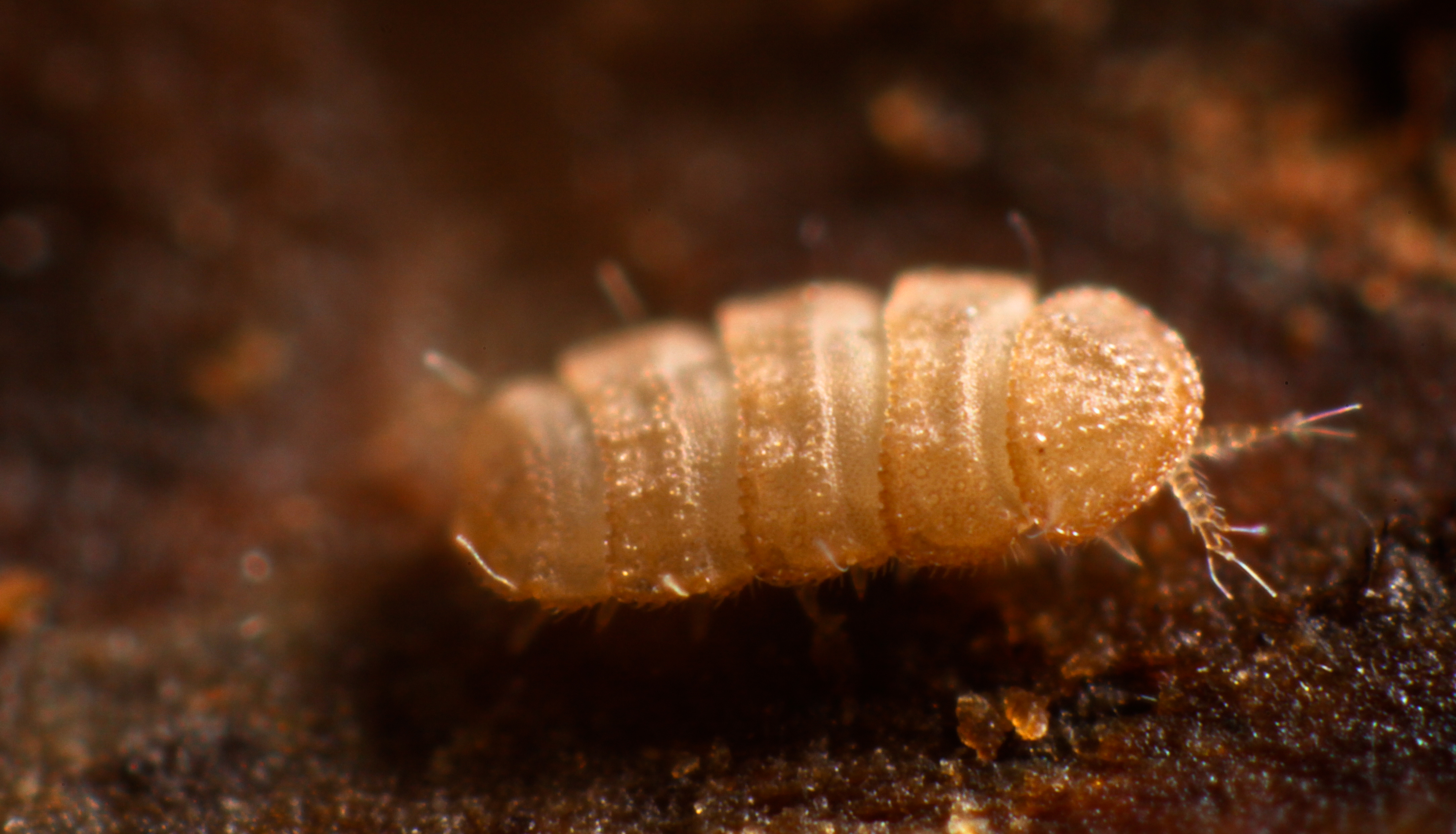

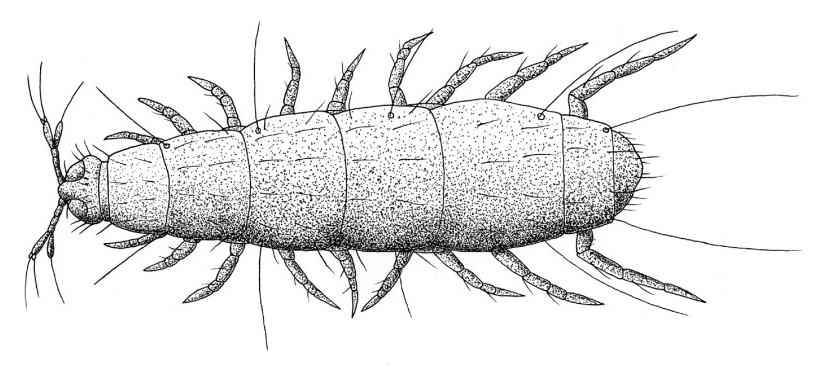

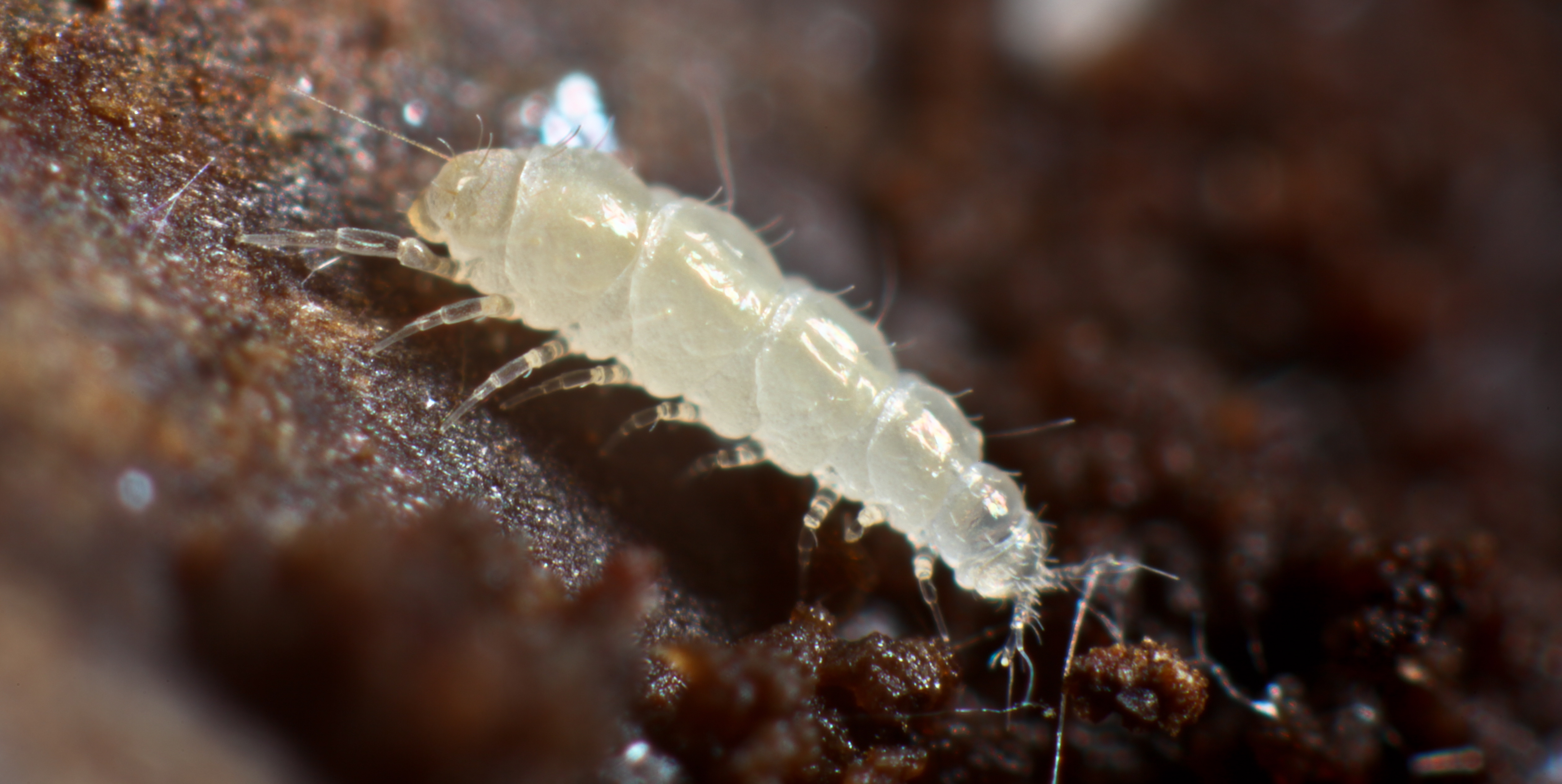

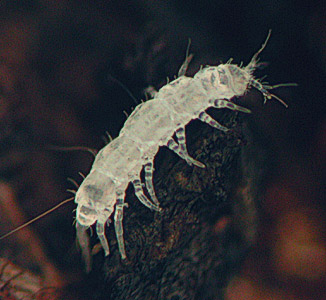

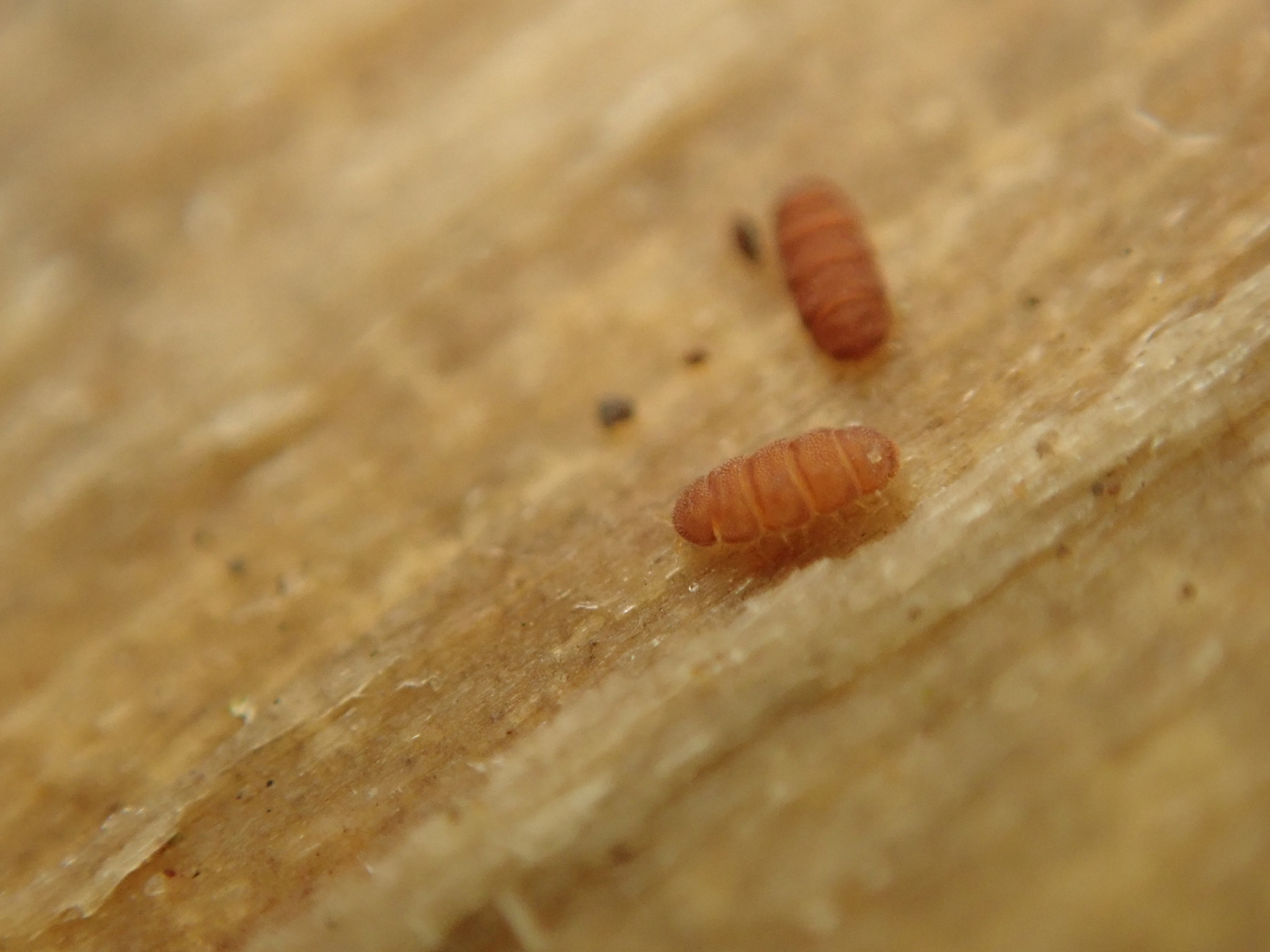
Two pauropods of the genus Eurypauropus.
