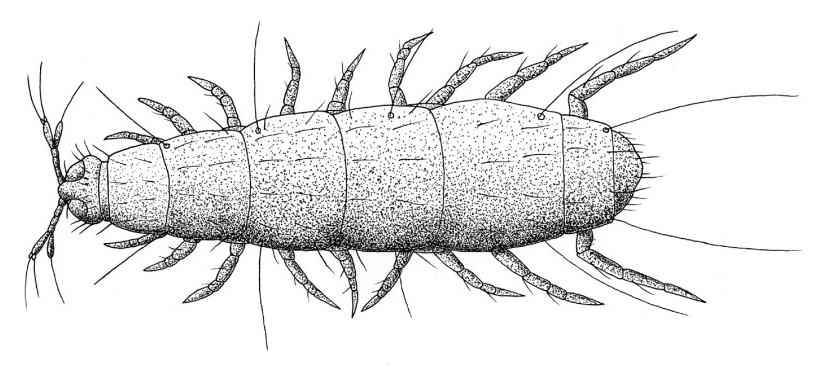
- Drawing of Pauropus huxley

Scientific classification
- Kingdom: Animalia
- Phylum: Arthropoda
- Subphylum: Myriapoda
- Class: Pauropoda
- Order: Tetramerocerata; Remy, 1950

= Tetramerocerata =

Order of arthropods

Tetramerocerata is an order of pauropods containing 11 families and more than 900 species. This order was created in 1950 to distinguish these pauropods from those in the newly discovered genus Millotauropus, which was found to have such distinctive features as to warrant placement in a separate order (Hexamerocerata) created to contain that genus. The order Tetramerocerata includes the vast majority of pauropod species, as there are only eight species in the order Hexamerocerata, which remains the only other order in the class Pauropoda.

== Description ==
Adult pauropods in the order Tetramerocerata feature antennae that have four stalk segments and are not telescopic, whereas species in the order Hexamerocerata have strongly telescopic antennae with six stalk segments. Two antennal branches emerge from the distal end of the fourth segment in Tetramerocerata, one dorsal and one ventral; in Hexamerocerata, however, the dorsal branch emerges from the distal end of the fifth segment, and the ventral branch emerges from the distal end of the sixth segment. In Tetramerocerata, the ventral branch features two long flagella, one anterior and one posterior, but the dorsal branch features only one; in Hexamerocerata, each branch features only one flagellum. In Tetramerocerata, the distal part of the ventral antennal branch also features a spheroid sense organ, the globulus. The lateral sides of the head feature two large eye-like organs, and in Tetramerocerata, these temporal organs are flat or somewhat convex; in Hexamerocerata, these organs are shaped like cups or umbrellas attached to a shallow depression in the head.

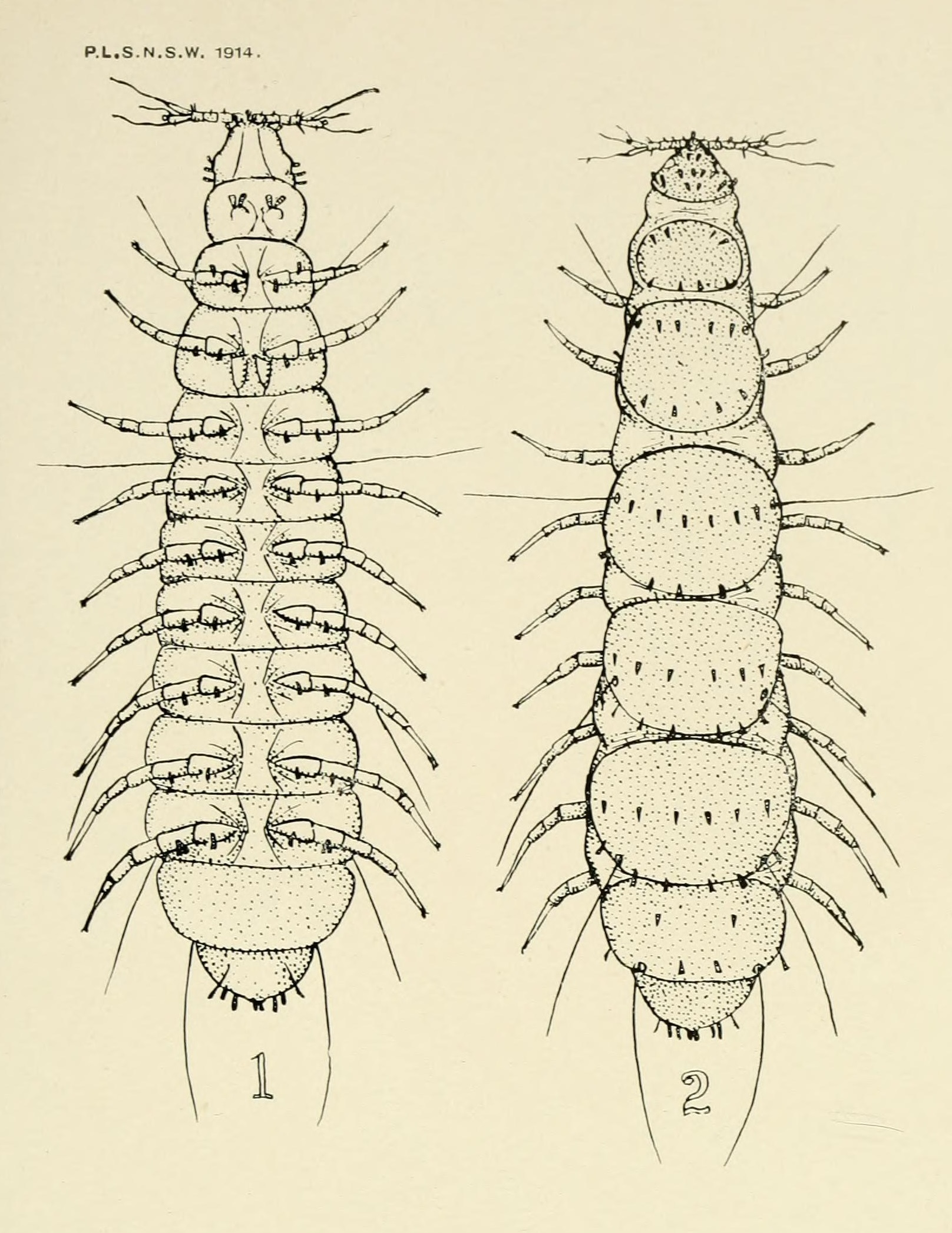
Pauropus amicus, ventral and dorsal views

Adults in the order Tetramerocerata have trunks with six tergites that may be entire or divided, whereas those in the order Hexamerocerata have twelve entire tergites. Although there are twelve trunk segments, in Tetramerocerata, the first, fourth, sixth, eighth, tenth, and twelfth segments are so short that the entire dorsal surface is covered by the tergites of the second, third, fifth, seventh, ninth, and eleventh segments. In Tetramerocerata, the ventral surface of the first trunk segment, the collum, features two appendages with a plate in between protruding in the anterior direction; in Hexamerocerata, this ventral surface is smooth. In Tetramerocerata, the tergum of the last trunk segment, the pygidium, features four pairs of setae; this tergum in Hexamerocerata features five to eight pairs of setae.

Most adults in the order Tetramerocerata have nine leg pairs. Adults in four genera (Cauvetauropus, Aletopauropus, Zygopauropus, and Amphipauropus) have only eight pairs, however, and adult females in the genus Decapauropus (in the Pauropodidae family) have either nine or ten pairs of legs. Adults in the order Hexamerocerata have eleven leg pairs.

== Feeding ==
The mouthparts in the order Tetramerocerata are weaker than those found in the order Hexamerocerata. The mandibles in Tetramerocerata are adapted for sucking fluids and are used to puncture cell walls. No solid food has been found in the midgut of pauropods in the order Tetramerocerata. The mandibles in the order Hexamerocerata, however, are strong enough to allow the consumption of solid food, and the midgut of pauropods in Hexamerocerata can contain fungus, spores, and plant tissue.

== Development ==
Most species in the order Tetramerocerata develop through a series of five post-embryonic stages, from the first instar to the adult. Juveniles in this order begin with three pairs of legs and three tergites, then in most species in this order, they become adults with nine leg pairs and six tergites. Pauropods in this order have three leg pairs in the first stage, then five pairs in the second, six pairs in the third, eight pairs in the fourth, and for most species in this order, nine pairs in the fifth (adult) stage. Juveniles in the order Hexamerocerata, however, begin with six leg pairs and eight tergites, then become adults with eleven leg pairs and twelve tergites, going through stages with six, eight, nine, ten, and eleven leg pairs.

== Distribution ==
The order Tetramerocerata has a subcosmopolitan distribution. These pauropods are found worldwide except for Antarctica. Two families in this order, Pauropodidae and Polypauropodidae, are especially widespread, each with a subcosmopolitan distribution.

== Families ==
This order includes the following families:

- Afrauropodidae Remy, 1959
- Amphipauropodidae Scheller, 2008
- Antichtopauropodidae Scheller, 2010
- Brachypauropodidae Silvestri, 1902
- Colinauropodidae Scheller, 1985
- Diplopauropodidae Scheller, 1988
- Eirmopauropodidae Scheller, 2010
- Eurypauropodidae Ryder, 1879
- Hansenauropodidae Remy, 1954
- Pauropodidae Lubbock, 1867
- Polypauropodidae Remy, 1932
- Sphaeropauropodidae Verhoeff, 1934
