= Neocambrisoma =

Scientific classification
- Kingdom: Animalia
- Phylum: Arthropoda
- Subphylum: Myriapoda
- Class: Diplopoda
- Order: Chordeumatida
- Family: Metopidiotrichidae
- Genus: Neocambrisoma; Mauriès, 1987

Type species
- Neocambrisoma raveni Mauriès, 1987

Genus of millipedes

Neocambrisoma is a genus of millipedes in the family Metopidiotrichidae. Millipedes in this genus are found in Tasmania and New South Wales in Australia. Like other genera in this family, this genus features 32 segments (counting the collum as the first segment and the telson as the last) in adults of both sexes, rather than the 30 segments usually observed in adults in the order Chordeumatida. Accordingly, female adults in this genus have 54 pairs of legs, which is not only the maximum number observed in this order but also the maximum number fixed by species in the class Diplopoda.

== Discovery ==
The genus Neocambrisoma was first described in 1987 by the French myriapodologist Jean-Paul Mauriès of the Muséum National d’Histoire Naturelle in Paris to contain the newly discovered type species N. raveni. He based the original description of this genus and this species on a male holotype and 16 paratypes (6 males and 10 females) found in Bruxner Forest Park, near Coffs Harbour in New South Wales in Australia. The holotype and 13 paratypes are deposited in the Queensland Museum, and the other paratypes are deposited in the Muséum National d’Histoire Naturelle. The genus name derives from Neocambria, Latin for "New Wales," and the latinized Greek suffix soma, meaning "body." The species is named for the Australian arachnologist Robert J. Raven, Curator of Arachnology at the Queensland Museum, who collected the type specimens.

In 1997, the zoologists William A. Shear and Robert Mesibov described the other two species in this genus, N. cachinnus and N. fieldensis. The original description of N. cachinnus is based on a male holotype found at Laughing Jack Lagoon in Tasmania and 28 paratypes (15 males and 13 females) found at the same locality and at Tarraleah in Tasmania. The original description of N. fieldensis is based on a male holotype found in leaf litter in Mount Field National Park in Tasmania. Both holotypes are deposited in the Queen Victoria Museum and Art Gallery in Launceston in Tasmania. The name of each species refers to its type locality: The species name for N. cachinnus derives from a Latin noun for "loud laughter," a reference to Laughing Jack Lagoon, and the species name for N. fieldensis refers to Mount Field National Park.

== Description ==
The two Tasmanian species are relatively small, ranging in size from 6.7 mm long for N. fieldensis up to 7.5 mm or 8.6 mm long (for males and females, respectively) in N. cachinnus. The type species N. raveni is larger, with adults ranging from 9.7 mm to 13.5 mm in length. All three species have 32 segments in adults.

The type species N. raveni features a dark brown stripe running in between two lighter stripes down the back. The legs are light brown but darker toward the distal ends, and the head is light brown with a yellow patch between the antennae. The species N. cachinnus also features a dark brown stripe running in between light tan stripes down the back, but the species N. fieldensis is a light cream-yellow with a slightly darker tan patches.

Female adults in this genus have 54 pairs of legs. In adult males, however, the eighth pair become anterior gonopods, and the ninth pair become posterior gonopods. Furthermore, in adult males in this genus, the tenth pair is also modified and reduced in size. These modifications are most dramatic in the type species N. raveni, in which the tenth pair is reduced to three segments and become paragonopods. These modifications are less dramatic in the other two species, in which the tenth pair has five segments.

Millipedes in the genus Neocambrisoma feature anterior gonopods with flagella, an unusual trait shared with three other genera in the family Metopidiotrichidae: Australeuma, Nesiothrix, and Nipponothrix. The anterior gonopods in Neocambrisoma, however, also feature a large process projecting from the middle of the sternum. This median sternal process distinguishes this genus from the other three genera that also have anterior gonopods with flagella.

The type species N. raveni differs from the two other Neocambrisoma species not only by being larger and by having only three rather than five segments in the tenth leg pair in males but also by having setae on the sternal process of the anterior gonopods. The two Tasmanian species can be distinguished from one another based on their different pigmentation: N. fieldensis is lightly pigmented and mottled, whereas N. cachinnus features a dark brown median stripe. Furthermore, the tenth leg pair in the male of the species N. fieldensis features a process projecting from the sternum, whereas the male of the species N. cachinnus lacks such a projection.

== Development ==
Like other genera in this order, this genus is teloanamorphic, adding segments and legs through a series of molts until the adult stage, when the molting stops and the adult emerges with a final number of segments and legs. To arrive at 32 segments as adults, however, species in this genus must deviate from the anamorphosis usually observed in the order Chordeumatida. Little is known about post-embryonic development in this genus, but Mauriès found juveniles of the type species N. raveni with 30 segments and 48 pairs of legs. These numbers match those Mauriès found in the penultimate stage of development for females in the genus Peterjohnsia, which features 32 segments in adult females but only 30 segments in adult males.

Mauriès found a larger sample of juveniles in the genus Peterjohnsia, representing the three stages of development leading up to adulthood in females. This evidence seems to suggest that species with 32 segments may go through nine stages of development, as the typical chordeumatidan does, but with an extra segment added in the seventh and eighth stages and two extra leg pairs added in the eighth and ninth stages. The earliest stage sampled features 23 segments and 32 leg pairs, matching the numbers usually observed in the sixth stage of development in the typical chordeumatidan. The next stage sampled, however, features 27 segments and 40 leg pairs, adding one more segment than usually observed in the seventh stage. The penultimate stage sampled, with 30 segments and 48 leg pairs, has two more segments and two more leg pairs than usually observed in the eighth stage. Finally, the adult with 32 segments and 54 leg pairs has two more segments and four more leg pairs than usually observed in the ninth and final stage.

== Distribution ==
The type species N. raveni has been recorded only at its type locality (Bruxner Forest Park, near Coffs Harbour in New South Wales in Australia). The species N. fieldensis has also been recorded only at its type locality (Mount Field National Park in Tasmania). The species N. cachinnus has been recorded only at three sites at the southern end of the Central Plateau of Tasmania.

== Species ==
This genus includes three species:

- Neocambrisoma cachinnus Shear & Mesibov, 1997
- Neocambrisoma fieldensis Shear & Mesibov, 1997
- Neocambrisoma raveni Mauriès, 1987
