= Australeuma gladifer =

Scientific classification
- Kingdom: Animalia
- Phylum: Arthropoda
- Subphylum: Myriapoda
- Class: Diplopoda
- Order: Chordeumatida
- Suborder: Heterochordeumatidea
- Superfamily: Heterochordeumatoidea
- Family: Metopidiotrichidae
- Genus: Australeuma
- Species: A. gladifer

Binomial name
- Australeuma gladifer Shear & Mesibov, 1997

Tasmanian myriapod

Holotype site (NMV K7233): Mount Donna Buang, VIC'"`UNIQ--ref-00000006-QINU`"'

Australeuma gladifer is a species of millipede in Metopidiotrichidae family, and was first described in 1997 by William A. Shear and Bob Mesibov, It is a myriapod found in litter and only in Victoria, Australia.
