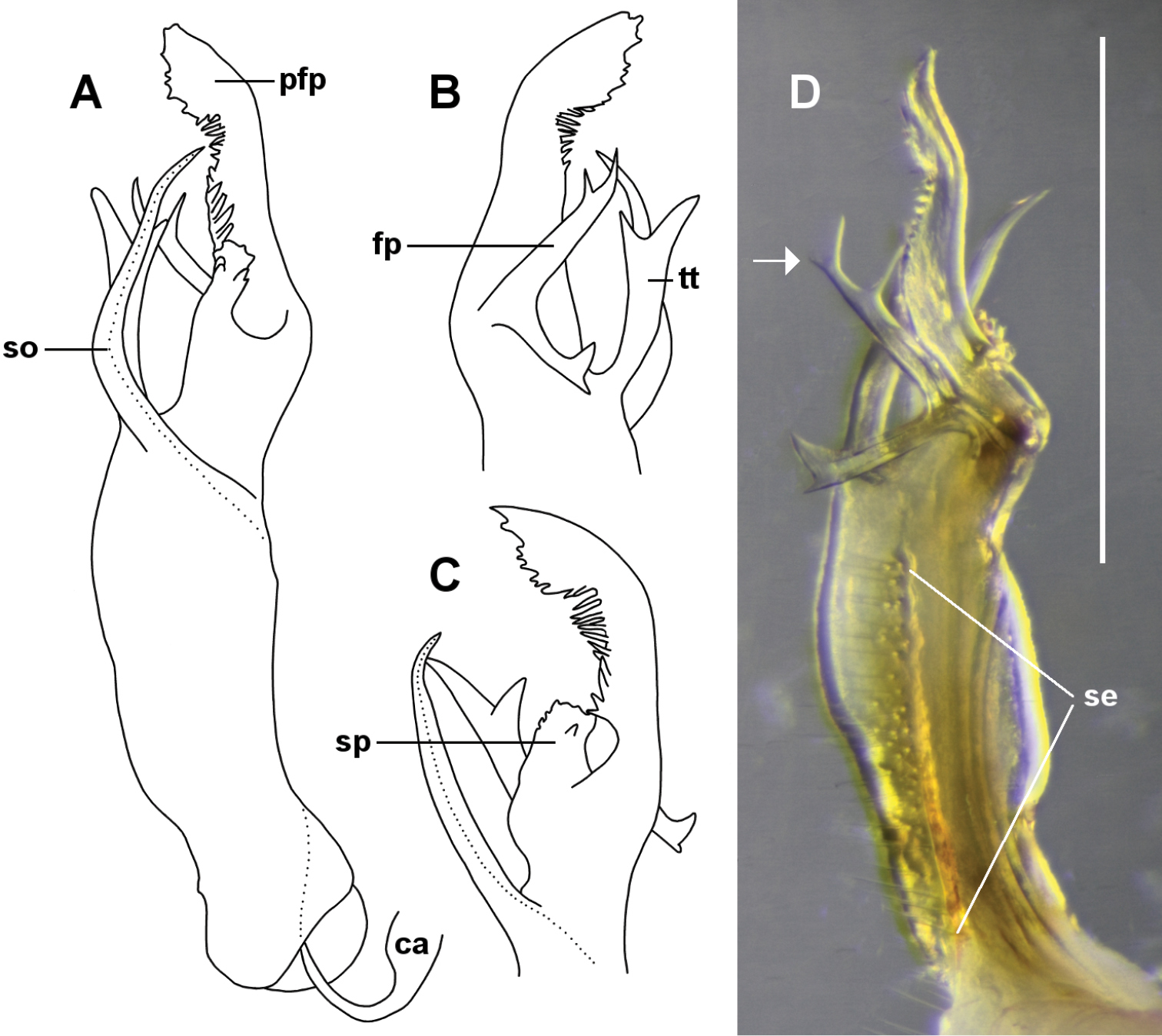

Scientific classification
- Kingdom: Animalia
- Phylum: Arthropoda
- Subphylum: Myriapoda
- Class: Diplopoda
- Order: Polydesmida
- Suborder: Dalodesmidea
- Family: Dalodesmidae
- Genus: Lissodesmus
- Species: L. nivalis

Binomial name
- Lissodesmus nivalis Mesibov, 2018

= Lissodesmus nivalis =

Tasmanian myriapod

Holotype site (QVM 2018:23:0038): Ben Lomond, TAS'"`UNIQ--ref-00000006-QINU`"'

Lissodesmus nivalis is a species of millipede in Dalodesmidae family, and was first described in 2018 by Bob Mesibov, It is an alpine myriapod found only in Tasmania.
