= Xystrosoma santllorence =

Scientific classification
- Kingdom: Animalia
- Phylum: Arthropoda
- Subphylum: Myriapoda
- Class: Diplopoda
- Order: Chordeumatida
- Family: Chamaesomatidae
- Genus: Xystrosoma
- Species: X. santllorence

Binomial name
- Xystrosoma santllorence Serra & Mauriès, 2018

Species of millipede

Xystrosoma santllorence is a species of millipede in the family Chamaesomatidae. This millipede is notable as one of only a few species in the order Chordeumatida with only 26 segments in adults (counting the collum as the first segment and the telson as the last), four fewer than the 30 segments typically found in adults this order. This species is found in Spain.

== Discovery, distribution, and habitat ==
This species was first described in 2018 by the biologists Antoni Serra and Jean-Paul Mauriès. They based the original description of this species on a large sample of specimens, including a male holotype, a female allotype, and 65 other adult specimens (35 females and 30 males). This sample also includes 30 preadults (20 females and 10 males), in the penultimate stage of development, and 30 juveniles (including 11 females and one male) in the four preceding stages of development. Most of the type material is deposited at the University of Barcelona, but 15 paratypes are deposited in the Muséum National d'Histoire Naturelle in Paris.

These specimens were collected in 1992 in the municipality of Terrassa in the province of Barcelona in the autonomous community of Catalonia in Spain. The type locality features a Mediterranean climate. These specimens were extracted from soil samples from a holm oak (Quercus ilex) forest that also includes pines (Pinus halepensis), madrone (Arbutus unedo), heather (Erica multiflora), and rosemary (Rosmarinus officinalis). This millipede is most common in the layer of humus below the surface layer, where plant matter is in a state of advanced decomposition and colonized by fungal mycelium.

== Description ==
This species is notable for its small size: Adult females range from 3.44 mm to 3.95 mm in length, whereas adult males are smaller, ranging from 3.24 mm to 3.56 mm in length. This millipede is also one of only a few species in the order Chordeumatida with only 26 segments in adults, the minimum number recorded in this order. Accordingly, the adult female of this species has only 42 pairs of legs, and the adult male has only 40 pairs of walking legs, excluding the eighth and ninth leg pairs, which become gonopods.

The paranota are located slightly below the middle of the flanks. The dorsal surfaces of the head and trunk are densely covered with microscopic lamellae arranged as vertical plates oriented longitudinally and shaped like semicircles. The fifth segment of each antenna is 1.3 times longer than wide.

In males, the eighth leg pair become the anterior gonopods, which are divided by a deep transverse cleavage into an anterior part and a posterior part. A pair of elongated angiocoxites joined only at the base form the anterior part. The posterior part is a colpocoxite that is narrow at the base but wider distally, with two large lobes at the distal end that are separated by a median notch. Each lobe bears a lateral hook. In this species, the telopodites of the anterior gonopods are apparently reduced to a pair of small lateral stumps, one next to each side of the colpocoxite. The ninth leg pair in males become the posterior gonopods, which each take the form of a telopodite with two segments, including a small distal segment. The eleventh leg pair is also modified in males, with a short coxal hook projecting from the base of each leg.

This species shares an extensive set of traits with other species of Xystrosoma. For example, as in other species in this genus, the dorsal surfaces in this species feature small lamellae arranged as vertical plates oriented longitudinally and shaped like semicircles. Like other species in this genus, this species is also small and features paranota in a relatively ventral position. Furthermore, as in other species in this genus, the fifth segment of each antenna is longer than wide.

The males in this species also develop leg modifications similar to those observed in other species in this genus. For example, as in these other species, the anterior gonopods in this species features angiocoxites in front that are separate rather than fused, a colpocoxite toward the rear that is undivided rather than divided in the middle, and no flagella. Furthermore, as in these other species, the posterior gonopods in this species feature a coxa with a medial process and a telepodite with two segments, including a small distal segment. Moreover, as in these other species, the eleventh leg pair in males of this species features coxal hooks.

Other traits, however, distinguish this species from all other species in this genus. For example, adults of this species have only 26 segments, whereas adults in all other species of Xystrosoma have 28 or 30 segments. Furthermore, the colpocoxites in all these other species are framed by telopodites in the form of robust stems, whereas in this species, these telopodites are replaced by small nubbins. Moreover, in the other species, a pair of relatively slender rods are hidden in front of the colpocoxite and behind the angiocoxites, but in this species, these rods are absent.

== Development ==
This species arrives at a lower number of segments and legs through a process of post-embryonic development that deviates from the anamorphosis usually observed in the order Chordeumatida. Like other species in this order, X. santllorence is teloanamorphic, adding segments and legs through a series of molts until the adult stage, when the molting stops and the adult emerges with a final number of segments and legs. This species, however, goes through stages of development with 11, 15 or 16, 19, 22, and 24 segments before emerging as an adult with 26 segments in the final stage.

These stages resemble those observed the last six stages of development in Chamaesoma broelemanni, another chordeumatidan species with only 26 segments in adults, rather than the stages usually observed in the order Chordeumatida. This similarity suggests that X. santllorence, like its close relative C. broelemanni, reaches maturity and stops molting one stage earlier than most chordeumatidan species, in the eighth stage rather than in a ninth stage, and adds one fewer segment than most chordeumatidan species upon entering the sixth and seventh stages. Only the fourth stage of development in C. broelemanni deviates from the corresponding stage in X. santllorence: In this stage, C. broelemanni has only 15 segments, whereas X. santllorence can have either 15 or 16 segments.
