= Macrosternodesmus =

Scientific classification
- Kingdom: Animalia
- Phylum: Arthropoda
- Subphylum: Myriapoda
- Class: Diplopoda
- Order: Polydesmida
- Family: Macrosternodesmidae
- Genus: Macrosternodesmus; Brölemann, 1908
- Species: M. palicola

Binomial name
- Macrosternodesmus palicola Brölemann, 1908

Synonyms
- Macrosternodesmus palicolus Brölemann, 1908; Titanosoma jurassicum Verhoeff, 1910

Genus of millipede

Macrosternodesmus is a monotypic genus of flat-backed millipede in the order Polydesmida, and Macrosternodesmus palicola is the only species in this genus. Authorities disagree regarding the family in which this genus belongs: Some authorities place this genus in the family Macrosternodesmidae. whereas others place this genus in the family Trichopolydesmidae. This millipede is a synanthrope widely distributed in western Europe. This species is the smallest millipede in Europe, reaching only 4 mm in length, and features only 19 segments (counting the collum as the first segment and the telson as the last) rather than the 20 segments more commonly observed in the order Polydesmida.

== Distribution ==
This species is found in the United Kingdom, Ireland, France, Belgium, the Netherlands, Luxembourg, Germany, Switzerland, the Czech Republic, Denmark, Norway, and Sweden. This millipede is widespread in Great Britain and Ireland but absent from much of northern Scotland, north Wales, and southwest England. In England, where this species is recorded especially frequently, this millipede has been found in many counties, including Northumberland, Durham, Yorkshire, Herefordshire, Gloucestershire, Oxfordshire, Bedfordshire, Hampshire, Surrey, and Sussex. In France, where this millipede was first discovered, this species has been recorded at many sites, including localities in the departments of Pyrenees-Atlantique, Lot-et-Garonne, Tarn-et-Garonne, Haute-Garonne, and Tarn.

== Habitats, ecology, and phenology ==
From the Pyrenees to Norway, this species is frequently found in calcareous soil and is common in the litter of beech (Fagus) woods on this soil in the winter. In England, for example, this species has been found in shallow rendzina soils, in the beech woods growing on the chalk downs of southern England, and in the ancient deciduous woodlands of the Chiltern Hills in Oxfordshire. In Belgium, where this species is also frequently recorded, this millipede is often found in woodlands on limestone and chalk, with relatively few records from synanthropic sites. This millipede may be native to these deciduous woods on calcareous soils in its Atlantic distribution, but its range also extends further east to synanthropic sites in Sweden and Germany.

Most records of this millipede are from biotopes made by humans. In England, this species is associated with urban or suburban sites such as churchyards, gardens, and parks. At these synanthropic sites, this millipede is not limited to calcareous soil and has been found in gardens on acid sands in East Anglia and gritstone in Yorkshire.

On the British Isles, this millipede is often found under large stones during winter, frequently during periods of frost. Adults are found in Ireland and Great Britain from October through July, most often in April and May. In southwestern France, this species reaches maturity in autumn, and adults are found from November to February.

== Discovery and taxonomy ==
This genus and its only species were first described in 1908 by the French myriapodologist Henri W. Brölemann. He based the original description of this species on specimens that included adults and young of both sexes. He found these specimens in the soil of a flowerbed in his garden at his home in the commune of Pau in France.

In 1910, the German zoologist Karl W. Verhoeff described Titanosoma as a new monotypic genus and T. jurassicum as a newly discovered species in this genus. He based his description of this genus and species on a single female specimen that he found in limestone scree near Kelheim in the state of Bavaria in Germany. In 1911, about 30 females and ten juveniles of the same species were collected in the county of Durham in northern England. In 1934, the German zoologist Otto Shubart deemed T. jurassicum to be a junior synonym of M. palicola. Authorities now consider these millipedes to be the same species and accept M. palicola as its valid name.

Authorities disagreed regarding the classification of Macrosternodesmus in the decades following its original description, placing this genus in different families. In 1916, Brölemann proposed Macrosternodesmini as a tribe to contain this genus, and in 1980, the American biologist Richard L. Hoffman elevated this tribe name to family status as Macrosternodesmidae. After this elevation, authorities placed Macrosternodesmus in this family.

In 2013, however, the Russian zoologist Sergei I. Golovatch deemed Macrosternodesmidae to be a junior synonym of Trichopolydesmidae. Accordingly, some authorities place Macrosternodesmus in the family Trichopolydesmidae. Other authorities, however, reject the synonymy proposed by Golovatch and retain Macrosternodesmidae as a valid family. Accordingly, some references continue to place Macrosternodesmus in the family Macrosternodesmidae. Other authorities accept Macrosternodesmidae as a valid family with Macrosternodesmus as the type genus, but nevertheless place Macrosternodesmus in the family Trichopolydesmidae.

The biologists William A. Shear and James M. Reddell retain Macrosternodesmidae as a valid family mostly endemic to North America but also including Macrosternodesmus and three other monotypic European genera. Shear, Reddell, and the zoologist David B. Steinmann also suggest that Macrosternodesmus may be a junior synonym of the North American genus Chaetaspis based on a striking similarity in gonopod anatomy. Shear, Reddell, and Steinmann infer that North America may be the original source of the synanthropic species M. palicola.

== Description ==
This species is very small, with adults measuring from 3.5 mm to 4.0 mm in length and from 0.3 mm to 0.4 mm in breadth. The body is notably slender. This millipede is white, and with so little pigment, the dark contents of the gut are visible through the cuticle. The antennae are shaped like clubs. The head is much broader than the collum. The trunk segments feature poorly developed paranota. The sternites are each divided by a deep transverse groove. The tergites each feature three transverse rows of tubercles, three transverse rows of very short setae, and three or four teeth on each lateral edge. The telson is longer than the penultimate segment, which is as long as the preceding segment. This species does not roll into a tight spiral when disturbed.

Adults of each sex feature 19 segments (including the telson). Adult females have 29 pairs of legs; adult males have 28 leg pairs, excluding the eighth leg pair, which become gonopods. Like other millipedes in the order Polydesmida, Macrosternodesmus goes through several stages of teloanamorphosis until reaching maturity, but this genus reaches maturity one molt earlier than the typical polydesmidan. Thus, millipedes in this genus go through only seven stages and emerge as adults with only 19 segments, with 29 leg pairs in females, whereas most other polydesmidans go through eight stages and emerge as adults with 20 segments, with 31 leg pairs in females.

This species is often found with Ophiodesmus albonanus, another millipede recorded in the same woodlands on calcareous soils and the same synanthropic habitats. These two species have similar geographic distributions. The monotypic genus Ophiodesmus is similar enough to the type genus Macrosternodesmus to be placed in the family Macrosternodesmidae. Both of these species are small and pallid, and they each feature three tranverse rows of setae, so they may easily be confused with one another.

These two monotypic genera may be distinguished from one another, however, based on other traits. For example, the tergites feature tubercles on the dorsal surface and teeth on the lateral edges in Macrosternodesmus but are smooth on both the dorsal surface and the lateral edges in Ophiodesmus. Furthermore, adults in Macrosternodesmus have only 19 segments, whereas adults in Ophiodesmus have the 20 segments usually observed in the order Polydesmida. Moreover, Ophiodesmus is somewhat larger, reaching 5 mm in length and ranging from 0.5 mm to 0.8 mm in breadth, and the setae are longer and more obvious in Ophiodesmus but very short and obscure in Macrosternodesmus.
