= Lissodesmus anas =

Scientific classification
- Kingdom: Animalia
- Phylum: Arthropoda
- Subphylum: Myriapoda
- Class: Diplopoda
- Order: Polydesmida
- Suborder: Dalodesmidea
- Family: Dalodesmidae
- Genus: Lissodesmus
- Species: L. anas

Binomial name
- Lissodesmus anas Mesibov, 2006

Tasmanian myriapod

Holotype site (QVM 2018:23:0038): Duck Creek, TAS

Lissodesmus anas is a species of millipede in Dalodesmidae family, and was first described in 2006 by Bob Mesibov, It is a myriapod found only in Tasmania.
