= Lissodesmus blackwoodensis =

Scientific classification
- Kingdom: Animalia
- Phylum: Arthropoda
- Subphylum: Myriapoda
- Class: Diplopoda
- Order: Polydesmida
- Suborder: Dalodesmidea
- Family: Dalodesmidae
- Genus: Lissodesmus
- Species: L. blackwoodensis

Binomial name
- Lissodesmus blackwoodensis Mesibov, 2006

Victorian myriapod

Holotype site (NMV K8933): 3 km NW of Blackwood, VIC

Lissodesmus blackwoodensis is a species of millipede in Dalodesmidae family, and was first described in 2006 by Bob Mesibov, It is a myriapod found in Victoria, and was described from specimens found in wet eucalypt forest in the Wombat State Forest.
