= Agenodesmus =

Scientific classification
- Kingdom: Animalia
- Phylum: Arthropoda
- Subphylum: Myriapoda
- Class: Diplopoda
- Order: Polydesmida
- Family: Fuhrmannodesmidae
- Genus: Agenodesmus; Loomis, 1934

Type species
- Agenodesmus reticulatus Loomis, 1934

Species
- Agenodesmus nullus; Agenodesmus reticulatus

Genus of millipedes

Agenodesmus is a genus of millipedes in the family Fuhrmannodesmidae, which some authorities consider a junior synonym of Trichopolydesmidae. This genus is notable for being among the very few genera in the order Polydesmida to feature adults with only 18 segments (including the telson) rather than the 20 segments usually found in this order. The genus Agenodesmus contains only two species, A. reticulatus and A. nullus. The type species A. reticulatus is notable as the first polydesmidan millipede discovered with only 18 segments in adults, the smallest number recorded in the order Polydesmida. Before the discovery of A. reticulatus, polydesmidans were known to have only 19 or 20 segments in adults.

== Discovery and distribution ==
The American biologists Orator F. Cook and Harold F. Loomis found the first specimens of A. reticulatus, including the male type specimen and several females, in Haiti in June 1927. Eleven more specimens were found in 1930 and 1932, including mature females as well as young, in not only Haiti but also Saint Kitts, Saint Lucia, Dominica, and Grenada. Loomis first described the genus Agenodesmus and its type species A. reticulatus in 1934 based on these specimens. This species is usually found in moist dead leaves.

A closely related species with only 18 segments in adults, Hexadesmus lateridens, was discovered in Cuba in 1931, with Loomis finding additional specimens in Saint Kitts and Carriacou in 1932. Loomis described the genus Hexadesmus and its type specimen H. lateridens based on these specimens in 1933, before he described A. reticulatus in 1934. Loomis also collected a young specimen of H. lateridens in Haiti in July 1927. Thus, H. lateridens was the first species formally described with so few segments in adults but the second such species to be discovered.

In 1987, the biologists William A. Shear and Stewart B. Peck described the second species of Agenodesmus to be discovered, A. nullus, based on a male holotype and two female paratypes found on Santa Cruz island in the Galapagos islands in 1985. This species exhibits sexual dimorphism in segment number: adult males of this species have only 18 segments, but the adult females have the 20 segments usually found in polydesmidans. Shear and Peck also report finding H. lateridens on Santa Cruz island and suggest that both A. nullus and H. lateridens are synanthropes introduced to the Galapagos islands by humans. The small sizes of Agenodesmus and Hexadesmus make them likely to be transported in soil undetected and spread by humans.

== Description ==
Both species in the genus Agenodesmus are notable for their small sizes. The tiny type species A. reticulatus reaches a maximum size of only 2 mm in length and only 0.25 mm in width. Although Shear and Peck named the second species in this genus A. nullus in light of its very small size, this species is larger than A. reticulatus: the male holotype measures 2.6 mm in length and 0.25 mm in width, and the female paratype that was collected with the holotype measures 2.75 mm in length and 0.25 mm in width. These species are among the smallest millipedes known.

The species A. reticulatus is white with a slight tinge of pink. The species A. nullus lacks pigment, as does H. lateridens. Both species of Agenodesmus, however, are smaller than H. lateridens, which can reach 3.8 mm in length and 0.3 mm in width. Both species of Agenodesmus may be distinguished from their close relative Hexadesmus by not only their sizes but also the shape of their dorsal setae: the setae of Agenodesmus are clavate (club-shaped), whereas the setae of Hexadesmus are slender and acute (sharply pointed). The two species of Agenodesmus may be distinguished from one another by not only their size but also the ozopores on the dorsal surface of their body segments: A. reticulatus and A. nullus feature ozopores on different sets of segments.

LIke other millipedes in the order Polydesmida, polydesmidans with only 18 segments as adults go through several stages of teloanamorphosis until reaching maturity, but these millipedes reach maturity two molts earlier than the typical polydesmidan. Thus, females of the species A. nullus reach maturity with the usual 20 segments and 31 pairs of legs, but females of the species A. reticulatus reach maturity with only 18 segments and 27 leg pairs. Males of both species of Agenodesmus reach maturity with only 18 segments and 26 pairs of walking legs, excluding the eighth leg pair, which become gonopods.
