= Neocambrisoma raveni =

Scientific classification
- Kingdom: Animalia
- Phylum: Arthropoda
- Subphylum: Myriapoda
- Class: Diplopoda
- Order: Chordeumatida
- Family: Metopidiotrichidae
- Genus: Neocambrisoma
- Species: N. raveni

Binomial name
- Neocambrisoma raveni Mauriès, 1982

Species of millipede

Neocambrisoma raveni is a species of millipede in the family Metopidiotrichidae. These millipedes are found in New South Wales in Australia. Like other species in this family, N. raveni features 32 segments (counting the collum as the first segment and the telson as the last) in adults of both sexes, rather than the 30 segments usually observed in adults in the order Chordeumatida. Accordingly, adult females of this species have 54 pairs of legs, which is not only the maximum number observed in this order but also the maximum number fixed by species in the class Diplopoda.

== Discovery ==
This species was first described in 1987 by the French myriapodologist Jean-Paul Mauriès of the Muséum National d’Histoire Naturelle in Paris as the type species for the new genus Neocambrisoma. He based the original description of this genus and this species on a male holotype and 16 paratypes (6 males and 10 females) found in Bruxner Forest Park, near Coffs Harbour in New South Wales in Australia. The holotype and 13 paratypes are deposited in the Queensland Museum, and the other paratypes are deposited in the Muséum National d’Histoire Naturelle. The genus name derives from Neocambria, Latin for "New Wales," and the Latinized Greek suffix soma, meaning "body." The species is named for the Australian arachnologist Robert J. Raven, Curator of Arachnology at the Queensland Museum, who collected the type specimens.

== Description ==
This species features 32 segments in adults of both sexes. The adults range from 9.7 mm to 13.5 mm in length and from 1.1 mm to 1.4 mm in width. This millipede features a dark brown stripe running in between two lighter stripes down the back. The legs are light brown but darker toward the distal ends, and the head is light brown with a yellow patch between the antennae. The segments of the antennae are slightly clavate, especially the most distal segments. The eyes feature relatively few ocelli, only 14 to 17 in adults, arranged in six or seven (rarely eight) rows, with one to four ocelli per row.

Female adults of this species have 54 pairs of legs. In adult males, the sixth and seventh leg pairs are thicker than the other legs, the eighth pair become anterior gonopods, and the ninth pair become posterior gonopods. The anterior gonopods are sometimes called peltogonopods and are especially distinctive, with a large process projecting from the middle of the sternum in between a pair of vestigial legs and in front of a pair of sturdy flagella.

Furthermore, in adult males of this species, the tenth leg pair is reduced to three segments and become paragonopods instead of walking legs. The paragonopods feature a pair of processes projecting from the sternum in front of the reduced legs. These projections are only slightly shorter than the reduced legs.

This species shares a distinctive set of traits with the other two species in the genus Neocambrisoma, N. cachinnus and N. fieldensis. For example, the anterior gonopods in all species in this genus feature flagella and a large process projecting from the middle of the sternum. Furthermore, the tenth pair of legs is reduced in adult males of all three species.

The species N. raveni, however, is larger than the two other Neocambrisoma species, which reach a maximum size of only 8.6 mm in length. The species N. raveni can also be distinguished from the other two species based on the features found in the adult males. For example, adult males of the other two species feature five segments in the tenth leg pair rather than the three segments observed in N. raveni. Furthermore, N. raveni also features setae on the sternal process of the anterior gonopods, whereas the other two species do not.

== Development ==
Like other millipedes in this order, the species N. raveni is teloanamorphic, adding segments and legs through a series of molts until the adult stage, when the molting stops and the adult emerges with a final number of segments and legs. To arrive at 32 segments as adults, however, these millipedes must deviate from the anamorphosis usually observed in the order Chordeumatida. Little is known about post-embryonic development in this species, but Mauriès found juvenile specimens with 30 segments and 48 pairs of legs. These numbers match those Mauriès found in the penultimate stage of development for females in the genus Peterjohnsia, which features 32 segments in adult females but only 30 segments in adult males.

Mauriès found a larger sample of juveniles in the genus Peterjohnsia, representing the three stages of development leading up to adulthood in females. This evidence seems to suggest that species with 32 segments may go through nine stages of development, as the typical chordeumatidan does, but with an extra segment added in the seventh and eighth stages and two extra leg pairs added in the eighth and ninth stages. The earliest stage sampled features 23 segments and 32 leg pairs, matching the numbers usually observed in the sixth stage of development in the typical chordeumatidan. The next stage sampled, however, features 27 segments and 40 leg pairs, adding one more segment than usually observed in the seventh stage. The penultimate stage sampled, with 30 segments and 48 leg pairs, has two more segments and two more leg pairs than usually observed in the eighth stage. Finally, the adult with 32 segments and 54 leg pairs has two more segments and four more leg pairs than usually observed in the ninth and final stage.

== Distribution ==
This species has been recorded only at its type locality, in Bruxner Forest Park, near Coffs Harbour in New South Wales in Australia.
