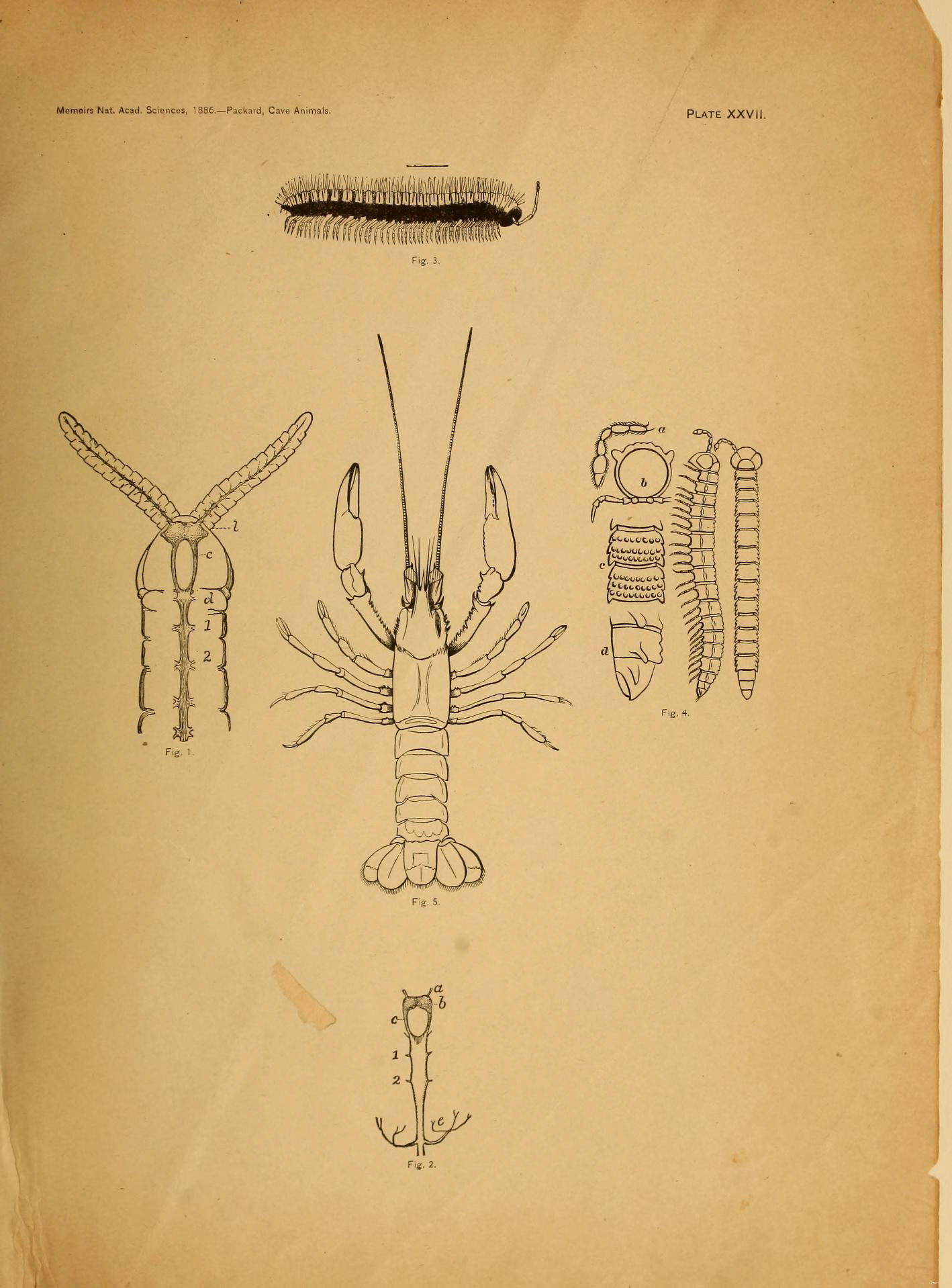
- Fig 4. Illustration of Packardesmus cavicola.

Scientific classification
- Kingdom: Animalia
- Phylum: Arthropoda
- Subphylum: Myriapoda
- Class: Diplopoda
- Order: Polydesmida
- Family: Macrosternodesmidae
- Genus: Packardesmus; Shear & Shelley, 2019
- Species: P. cavicola

Binomial name
- Packardesmus cavicola (Packard, 1877)

Synonyms
- Polydesmus cavicola Packard, 1877

= Packardesmus =

Genus of millipede

Packardesmus is a monotypic genus of flat-backed millipede in the family Macrosternodesmidae, and Packardesmus cavicola is the only species in this genus. Discovered in a cave in Utah and first described in 1877, this species was among the first North American millipedes described as a troglobiont. This millipede is also one of only a few species in the order Polydesmida in which the adult male features only 18 segments (counting the collum as the first segment and the telson as the last) rather than the 20 segments normally observed in this order. This millipede also exhibits sexual dimorphism in segment number, with 19 segments in the adult female but only 18 segments in the adult male.

== Discovery and taxonomy ==
This species was first described in 1877 under the name Polydesmus cavicola by the American biologist Alpheus Spring Packard, Jr. He based the original description of this species on four specimens that he found in 1875 under stones in a damp spot in Clinton's Cave in the Oquirrh Mountains, near Lake Point on the south shore of the Great Salt Lake in Utah. The species name refers to the cave habitat of this millipede.

Authorities remained uncertain of the proper classification of this species for more than 140 years because they could not locate any of the four syntypes. In 1958, stating that the type specimens were "[n]ot known to exist," the American biologists Ralph V. Chamberlin and Richard L. Hoffman transferred this species to the genus Brachydesmus. This transfer was based on the original description of this species as having 19 trunk segments.

In 2019, the American zoologists William A. Shear and Rowland M. Shelley proposed a new genus Packardesmus to contain this species after locating a female lectotype deposited at the Museum of Comparative Zoology at Harvard University. They also examined five other specimens: a female collected at the type locality in 1909, which they borrowed from the United States National Museum of Natural History, and four others (three females and one male) collected together from Clinton's Cave in 2003. They concluded that the lectotype and the other five specimens all belong to the same species. The four specimens collected in 2003 are deposited at the Virginia Museum of Natural History. Shear and Shelley named their proposed genus for Packard, who discovered and described the type species, and they placed this genus in the subfamily Macrosternodesminae within the family Macrosternodesmidae. Authorities now accept Packardesmus cavicola as the valid name for this species, but some place this genus in the family Trichopolydesmidae instead.

== Description ==
This millipede can reach 6 mm in length in each sex, with the maximum width reaching 0.6 mm in the male and 0.66 mm in the female. The body is uniformly pale white, including the head and appendages. The head is large and much broader than the body, which is notably narrow and more cylindrical than usual for a polydesmidan millipede. The head is densely covered with fine setae. Like all polydesmidan species, this millipede lacks eyes.

The antennae are relatively long and can reach back to the posterior margin of the third body segment. Each antenna features eight segments: The first segment is short and conical, whereas the next three segments are cylindrical, with the second and third the same length as each other. The fourth and fifth are markedly shorter than the second and third, with the fifth slightly inflated. The sixth is more enlarged and more spherical. The seventh segment is small and shaped like a pear, concealing a much smaller eighth segment with four sensory cones at the distal end.

The head is much wider than the collum, which has a convex anterior margin but a straight posterior margin. The collum features three rows of seven to eight setae and a small tooth at the posterior corner of each side. The trunk segments feature three rows of tubercles and paranota with four teeth on the lateral margins and acute posterior corners. The body is covered with fine setae that are short and blunt. The telson is conical and ends in a curved spine. Each leg features six segments and ends in a long claw shaped like a spatula.

The adult male features 18 segments, counting the collum, 15 segments with legs (podous rings), a legless (apodous) penultimate segment, and the telson. The adult female features 19 segments, including the collum, 16 podous rings, one apodous ring, and the telson. Accordingly, the adult female features 29 pairs of legs, whereas the adult male features 26 pairs of walking legs, excluding the eighth leg pair, which become a pair of gonopods. The gonopods emerge from an oval aperture with a rim. Each gonopod features a long stem that ends in four curved branches with pointed distal ends. On each gonopod, one of these four branches features the seminal pore.

This millipede shares many traits with its close relatives in the subfamily Macrosternodesminae. For example, like other millipedes in this subfamily, this millipede is small, lacks pigment, and features dorsal setae and well developed paranota with teeth. Furthermore, like other millipedes in this subfamily, this millipede features antennae with bulbous distal segments, including an enlarged sixth segment. The adult males in this genus can be distinguished from other adult males in closely related genera, however, based on the unusual number of segments in this genus and the unique gonopods in this genus that are each shaped like a hand with four fingers.

== Distribution and habitat ==
This genus is known only from Clinton's Cave in Tooele County, close to the border with Salt Lake County, in Utah. This cave is shallow enough to allow light to penetrate throughout. The surrounding area is inhospitable, ranging from saline desert to dry grassland with sagebrush desert further away. Although Packard described this species as adapted to life in darkness based on its long antennae, Shear and Shelley do not find these antennae to be longer than those on similar millipedes dwelling on the surface. They believe that this species inhabits Clinton's Cave as an isolated population but is not a troglobiont and might be found in favorable habitats elsewhere.
