= Dasystigma =

Scientific classification
- Kingdom: Animalia
- Phylum: Arthropoda
- Subphylum: Myriapoda
- Class: Diplopoda
- Order: Polydesmida
- Family: Dalodesmidae
- Genus: Dasystigma; Mesibov, 2003

Genus of millipedes

Dasystigma is a genus in the Dalodesmidae family of millipedes. The genus was first described in 2003 by Robert Mesibov. The type species is Dasystigma margaretae.

The genus is endemic to Tasmania.

== Species ==
There are currently 4 accepted species in the genus Dasystigma according to the World Register of Marine Species (WoRMS).

- Dasystigma bonhami Mesibov, 2003
- Dasystigma huonense Mesibov, 2003
- Dasystigma margaretae (Jeekel, 1984)
- Dasystigma tyleri Mesibov, 2003
