= Opisthocheiron canayerensis =

Scientific classification
- Kingdom: Animalia
- Phylum: Arthropoda
- Subphylum: Myriapoda
- Class: Diplopoda
- Order: Chordeumatida
- Family: Opisthocheiridae
- Genus: Opisthocheiron
- Species: O. canayerensis

Binomial name
- Opisthocheiron canayerensis Mauriès & Goeffrey, 1982

Species of millipede

Opisthocheiron canayerensis is a species of millipede in the family Opisthocheiridae. This species is found in France, far inside deep caves. This millipede is notable as one of only a few species in the order Chordeumatida with only 26 segments in adults (counting the collum as the first segment and the telson as the last), four fewer segments than typically found in adults this order.

== Discovery and distribution ==
This species was first described in 1982 by the myriapodologists Jean-Paul Mauriès and Jean-Jacques Geoffroy. The original description is based on specimens collected in 1981 from the Baume Layrou cave in Trèves, in the eastern part of the Grands Causses, in the department of Gard in France. These specimens include a male holotype, eight other males, thirteen females, and two juveniles. The type specimens are deposited in the Muséum National d'Histoire Naturelle in Paris. The species is named for the Causse de Canayère, the plateau where the type specimens were found. Since the discovery of this millipede, many more specimens have been collected and studied, not only from the Baume Layrou cave but also from the Cabanes du Trevezel cave and the Bramabieu cave, which are also in the Grands Causses in the department of Gard in France.

== Description ==
Unlike all other species in the genus Opisthocheiron, this species lacks pigmentation, an absence that reflects adaptation to life in the darkness of caves. This species also has few ocelli (only seven to nine in adults) and long legs, which are also common troglomorphic adaptations. This species is small: Adult males range from 6.5 mm to 7 mm in length, and adult females range from 8 mm to 10 mm in length.

This millipede is one of only a few species in the order Chordeumatida with only 26 segments in adults, the minimum number recorded in this order. Accordingly, the adult female of this species has only 42 pairs of legs, and the adult male has only 40 pairs of walking legs, excluding the eighth and ninth leg pairs, which become gonopods. This reduction in the number of segments and legs distinguishes this species from the other species in the genus Opisthocheiron, which all have the 30 segments in adults that are usually found in adults in the order Chordeumatida.

This species arrives at a lower number of segments and legs through a process of post-embryonic development that deviates from the anamorphosis usually observed in the order Chordeumatida. Like other species in this order, O. canayerensis is teloanamorphic, adding segments and legs through a series of molts until the adult stage, when the molting stops and the adult emerges with a final number of segments and legs. This species, however, reaches maturity and stops molting one stage earlier, in the eighth stage rather than in a ninth stage. Furthermore, O. canayerensis conforms to the pattern usually observed in most species of Chordeumatida only through the first five stages, then adds one fewer segment than usual upon entering the sixth and seventh stages. Thus, in this process, O. canayerensis goes through stages of development with 6, 8, 11, 15, 19, 22, and 24 segments, before emerging as an adult with 26 segments in the final stage.

This process is the same as that observed in the species Chamaesoma broelemanni, one of the other species in the order Chordeumatida with only 26 segments in adults, but with one difference. In O. canayerensis, the transformation of legs into gonopods in the male begins in the seventh stage and continues until the eighth and final stage. In C. broelemanni, however, this process begins in the sixth stage and continues until the eighth stage.
