= Pocockia =

Pocockia may refer to:

- Pocockia (millipede), a genus of millipedes in the family Metopidiotrichidae
- Pocockia, a genus of flowering plants in the family Fabaceae, synonym of Trigonella
- Pocockia, a genus of protists in the family Peridiniaceae, synonym of Ovoidinium
