= Agenodesmus reticulatus =

Scientific classification
- Kingdom: Animalia
- Phylum: Arthropoda
- Subphylum: Myriapoda
- Class: Diplopoda
- Order: Polydesmida
- Family: Fuhrmannodesmidae
- Genus: Agenodesmus
- Species: A. reticulatus

Binomial name
- Agenodesmus reticulatus Loomis, 1934

Species of millipede

Agenodesmus reticulatus is a species of millipede in the family Fuhrmannodesmidae, which some authorities consider a junior synonym of Trichopolydesmidae. This millipede is among the very few species in the order Polydesmida to feature adults with only 18 segments (including the telson) rather than the 20 segments usually found in this order. This species is notable as the first polydesmidan millipede discovered with only 18 segments in adults, the smallest number recorded in the order Polydesmida. Before the discovery of A. reticulatus, polydesmidans were known to have only 19 or 20 segments in adults.

== Discovery and distribution ==
The American biologists Orator F. Cook and Harold F. Loomis found the first specimens of A. reticulatus, including the male type specimen and several females, in Haiti in June 1927. Eleven more specimens were found in 1930 and 1932, including mature females as well as young, in not only Haiti but also Saint Kitts, Saint Lucia, Dominica, and Grenada. Loomis first described the genus Agenodesmus and its type species A. reticulatus in 1934 based on these specimens. The male holotype is deposited in the National Museum of Natural History in Washington, D.C.

A closely related species with only 18 segments in adults, Hexadesmus lateridens, was discovered in Cuba in 1931, with Loomis finding additional specimens in Saint Kitts and Carriacou in 1932. Loomis described the monotypic genus Hexadesmus and its type specimen H. lateridens based on these specimens in 1933, before he described A. reticulatus in 1934. Loomis also collected a young specimen of H. lateridens in Haiti in July 1927. Thus, H. lateridens was the first species formally described with so few segments in adults but the second such species to be discovered.

== Description ==
This millipede is notable not only for featuring only 18 segments in adults but also for its tiny size. The maximum size recorded is only 2 mm in length and 0.25 mm in width. This species is the smallest millipede in the Western hemisphere and one of the smallest millipedes known.

This species is white with a slight tinge of pink. The dorsal surface of the body features transverse rows of markedly clavate (club-shaped) setae but no tubercles. The first segment has an oval shape, about twice as wide as long, and is narrower than the head or the other segments. The anterior and posterior corners of all the keels are rounded except for the three segments in front of the telson, which have keels with sharply pointed posterior corners. The ozopores appear on the posterior corners of segments 5, 7, 9, 10, 12, 13, 15, 16, and 17. With only 18 segments, female adults have 27 pairs of legs, and male adults have 26 pairs of walking legs (excluding the eighth leg pair, which become gonopods).

This millipede is smaller than the only other species in the genus Agenodesmus, A. nullus, which reaches a maximum size of 2.75 mm in length and 0.25 mm in width. Both species of Agenodesmus are smaller than their close relative H. lateridens, which can reach 3.8 mm in length and 0.3 mm in width. Both species of Agenodesmus may be distinguished from H. lateridens by not only their sizes but also the shape of their dorsal setae: the setae of Agenodesmus are clavate, whereas the setae of H. lateridens are slender with sharp points.

The two species of Agenodesmus may be distinguished from one another by not only their sizes but also the ozopores on the dorsal surface of their body segments. Whereas the distribution of ozopores among these segments in A. reticulatus resembles the distribution typically observed in the order Polydesmida, A. nullus features a more unusual distribution. The distribution in A. nullus differs from that observed in A. reticulatus insofar as A. nullus features an ozopore on segment 14, a vestigial pore on segment 16, and no ozopore on segment 17. Furthermore, although adult males of the species A. nullus have 18 segments (like both male and female adults in the species A. reticulatus), adult females of the species A. nullus have 20 segments.

== Habitat and ecology ==
This millipede is usually found in moist dead leaves. This species has probably been distributed among the Caribbean islands in its range by humans. The small size of this millipede makes this species likely to be transported in soil undetected and spread inadvertently by humans.
