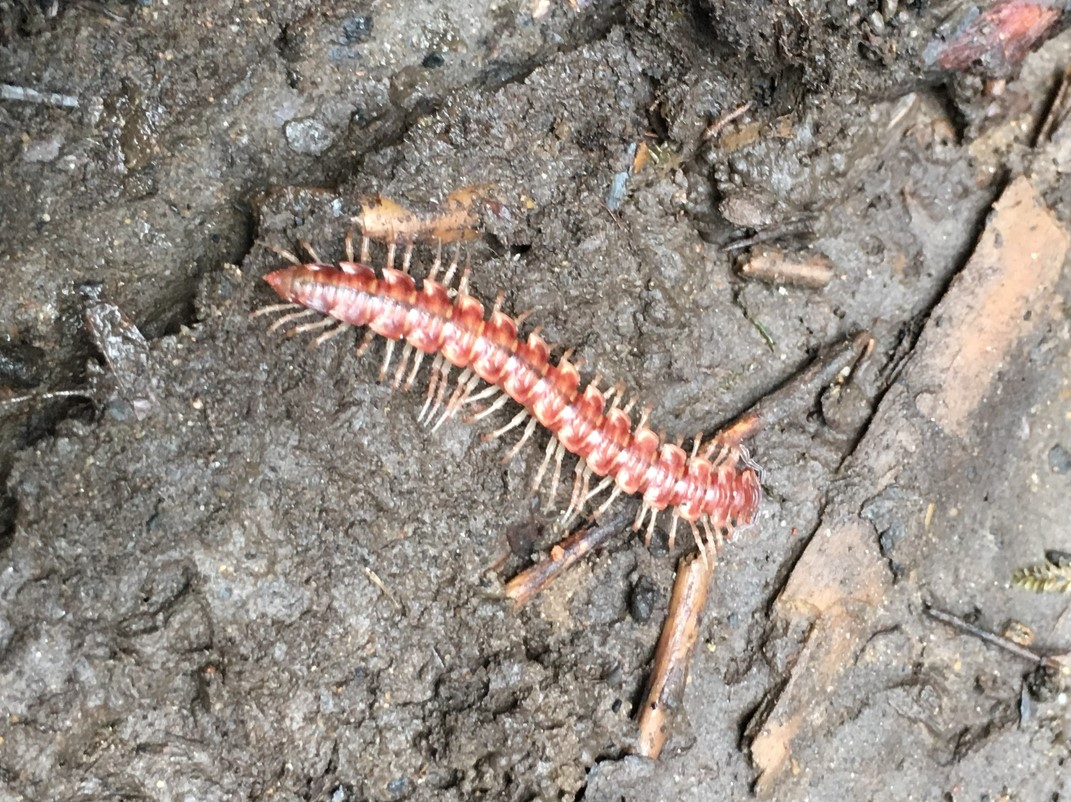
- Nearctodesmus salix

Scientific classification
- Kingdom: Animalia
- Phylum: Arthropoda
- Subphylum: Myriapoda
- Class: Diplopoda
- Order: Polydesmida
- Suborder: Polydesmidea
- Family: Nearctodesmidae; Chamberlin & Hoffman, 1950

= Nearctodesmidae =

Family of millipedes

Nearctodesmidae is a family of flat-backed millipedes in the order Polydesmida. These millipedes are found in northwestern North America. This family includes the species Nearctodesmus salix. The defensive secretion of this millipede consist of hydrogen cyanide, benzaldehyde, 3-methylbutanoic acid, and 2-methylbutanoic. This evidence confirms that cyanogenesis extends to the family Nearctodesmidae.

== Taxonomy ==
Authorities often consider Nearctodesmidae to be a junior synonym of Macrosternodesmidae. Many of these authorities demote Nearctodesmidae and place the genera previously assigned to that family in a subfamily (Nearctodesminae) in the family Macrosternodesmidae. Other authorities consider both Nearctodesmidae and Macrosternodesmidae to be junior synonyms of Trichopolydesmidae.

== Genera ==
Authorities include at least the following genera in this family:

- Bistolodesmus Shelley, 1994
- Ergodesmus Chamberlin, 1949
- Kepolydesmus Chamberlin, 1910
- Nearctodesmus Silvestri, 1910
