= Dasystigma margaretae =

Scientific classification
- Kingdom: Animalia
- Phylum: Arthropoda
- Subphylum: Myriapoda
- Class: Diplopoda
- Order: Polydesmida
- Family: Dalodesmidae
- Genus: Dasystigma
- Species: D. margaretae

Binomial name
- Dasystigma margaretae (Jeekel, 1984)

Synonyms
- Lissodesmus margaretae Jeekel, 1984

Species of millipede

Dasystigma margaretae is a species in the Dalodesmidae family of millipedes. It was first described in 1984 by C. A. W. Jeekel as Lissodesmus margaretae and was transferred to the genus Dasystigma in 2003 by Robert Mesibov, in a paper where the species was given a further description.

The species epithet honours Margaret A. Williams, an Australian entomologist, who collected the type specimen from Lake Augusta, Tasmania.

The species is endemic to Tasmania.
