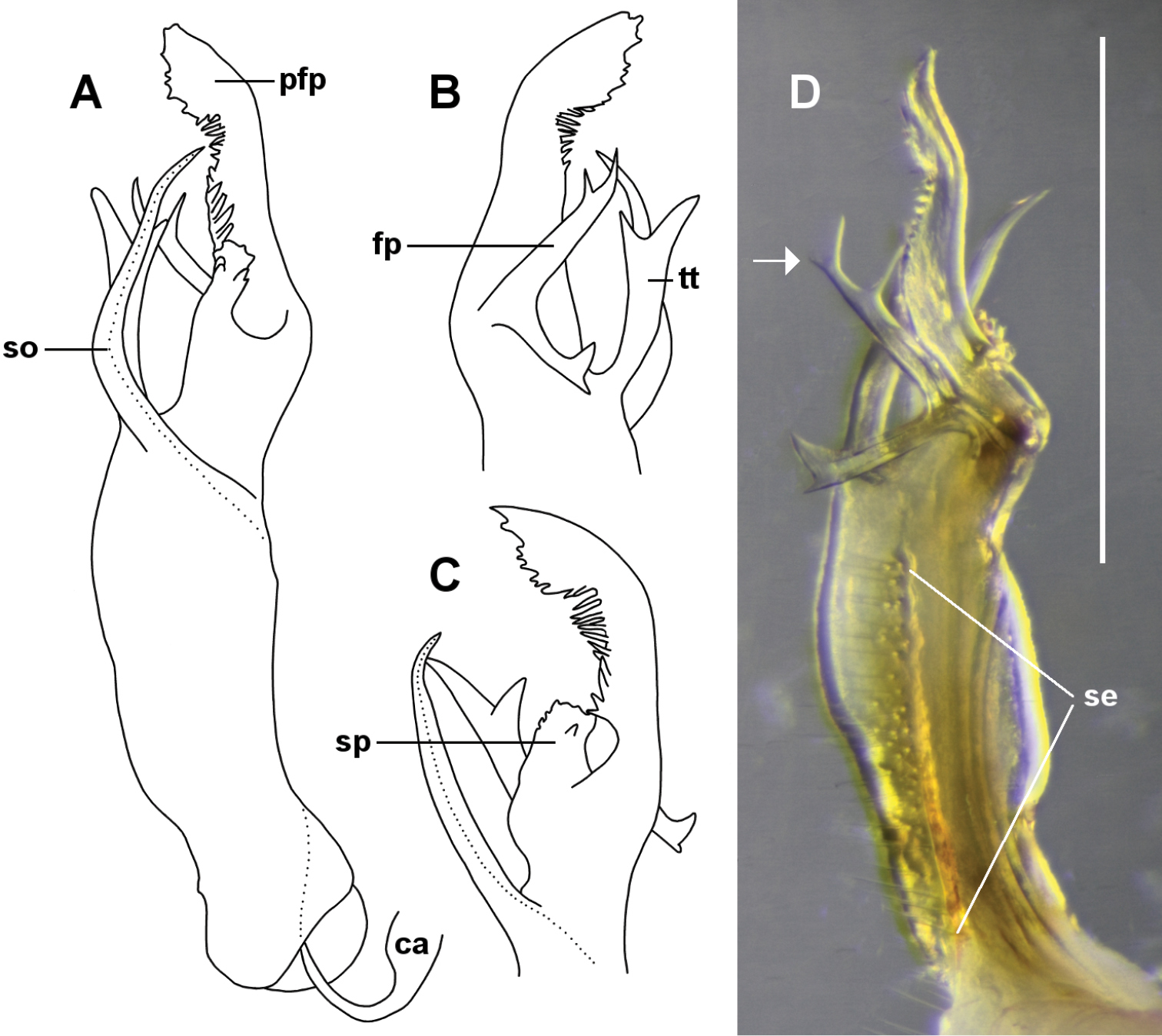
- Lissodesmus nivalis

Scientific classification
- Kingdom: Animalia
- Phylum: Arthropoda
- Subphylum: Myriapoda
- Class: Diplopoda
- Order: Polydesmida
- Family: Dalodesmidae
- Genus: Lissodesmus; Chamberlin, 1920

Synonyms
- Australopeltis Johns, 1964; Pseudoprionopeltis (Australopeltis) Johns, 1964

= Lissodesmus =

Genus of millipedes

Lissodesmus is a genus of the Dalodesmidae family of Millipedes. Species of the genus are found in Australia. They are commonly known as Tasmanian multipedes.

== Species ==
Currently there are 30 accepted species in the genus Lissodesmus according to the World Register of Marine Species (WoRMS). A further species was discovered in 2018 from Tasmania, Australia.

- Lissodesmus adrianae Jeekel, 1984
- Lissodesmus alisonae Jeekel, 1984
- Lissodesmus anas Mesibov, 2006
- Lissodesmus bashfordi Mesibov, 2006
- Lissodesmus blackwoodensis Mesibov, 2006
- Lissodesmus catrionae Mesibov, 2006
- Lissodesmus clivulus Mesibov, 2006
- Lissodesmus cognatus Mesibov, 2006
- Lissodesmus cornutus Mesibov, 2006
- Lissodesmus devexus Mesibov, 2006
- Lissodesmus dignomontis Mesibov, 2006
- Lissodesmus gippslandicus Mesibov, 2006
- Lissodesmus grampianensis Mesibov, 2008
- Lissodesmus hamatus Mesibov, 2006
- Lissodesmus horridomontis Mesibov, 2006
- Lissodesmus inopinatus Mesibov, 2006
- Lissodesmus johnsi Mesibov, 2006
- Lissodesmus latus Mesibov, 2006
- Lissodesmus macedonensis Mesibov, 2006
- Lissodesmus martini (Carl, 1902)
- Lissodesmus milledgei Mesibov, 2006
- Lissodesmus modestus Chamberlin, 1920
- Lissodesmus montanus Mesibov, 2006
- Lissodesmus nivalis Mesibov, 2018
- Lissodesmus orarius Mesibov, 2006
- Lissodesmus otwayensis Mesibov, 2006
- Lissodesmus peninsulensis Mesibov, 2006
- Lissodesmus perporosus Jeekel, 1984
- Lissodesmus plomleyi Mesibov, 2006
- Lissodesmus tarrabulga Mesibov, 2006

== Former species ==
- Lissodesmus margaretae Jeekel, 1984 is now accepted as Dasystigma margaretae (Jeekel, 1984).
