= Macrosternodesmidae =

Scientific classification
- Kingdom: Animalia
- Phylum: Arthropoda
- Subphylum: Myriapoda
- Class: Diplopoda
- Order: Polydesmida
- Suborder: Polydesmidea
- Family: Macrosternodesmidae; Brolemann, 1916

Family of millipedes

Macrosternodesmidae is a family of flat-backed millipedes in the order Polydesmida. Some authorities deem Macrosternodesmidae to be a junior synonym of Trichopolydesmidae. Others accept Macrosternodesmidae as a valid family but disagree regarding the genera included in this family.

== Taxonomy ==
In 1916, the French myriapodologist Henry W. Brölemann proposed Macrosternodesmini as a tribe to include the monotypic European genus Macrosternodesmus, which he had described earlier in 1908. In 1980, the American biologist Richard L. Hoffman elevated this tribe name to family status as Macrosternodesmidae. In 2013, however, the Russian zoologist Sergei I. Golovatch deemed Macrosternodesmidae to be a junior synonym of Trichopolydesmidae. In 2017, the biologists William A. Shear and James M. Reddell rejected this proposed synonymy and retained Macrosternodesmidae as a valid family mostly endemic to North America but also including Macrosternodesmus and three other monotypic European genera.

Authorities often consider Nearctodesmidae to be a junior synonym of Macrosternodesmidae. In 2017, Shear and Reddell placed the genera previously assigned to the family Nearctodesmidae in a new subfamily Nearctodesminae in the family Macrosternodesmidae. Others have adopted this proposed revision. In 2019, Shear, Rowland M. Shelley, and David B. Steinmann proposed two new genera (Packardesmus and Coloradesmus) and placed them in the other subfamily (Macrosternodesminae) in this family. Some authorities accept Macrosternodesmidae as a valid family but nevertheless place Macrosternodesmus, Packardesmus, and Coloradesmus in the family Trichopolydesmidae instead.

== Description ==
As described by Shear and Reddell based on North American species, the millipedes in this family feature a small collum shaped like a transverse oval and well developed paranota. Species in this family range from white to brown or red. Whereas millipedes in the subfamily Macrosternodesmidae are small (2.5 mm to 12 mm in length) and often lack pigment, those in the subfamily Neactodesminae are much larger (10 mm to 35 mm in length) and often brown, orange, pink, or red. Whereas Macrosternodesmines feature short antennae with bulbous distal segments, Nearctodesmines feature long antennae with cylindrical distal segments. The tergites feature setae that are often arranged on rows of tubercles in Macrosternodesmines, but these surfaces are entirely smooth and lack setae in Nearctodesmines.

== Genera ==
The revisions proposed by Shear, Reddell, Shelley, and Steinmann would include at least the following genera in the following two subfamilies in this family:

Subfamily Macrosternodesminae Brölemann, 1916

- Chaetaspis Bollman, 1887
- Coloradesmus Shear & Steinmann, 2019
- Macrosternodesmus Brölemann, 1908
- Nevadesmus Shear, 2009
- Ophiodesmus Cook, 1895
- Packardesmus Shear & Shelley, 2019
- Pratherodesmus Shear, 2009
- Sequoiadesmus Shear & Shelley, 2008
- Speodesmus Loomis, 1939
- Speorthus Chamberlin, 1952
- Tidesmus Chamberlin, 1943

Subfamily Nearctodesminae Chamberlin & Hoffman, 1950

- Bistolodesmus Shelley, 1994
- Ergodesmus Chamberlin, 1949
- Kepolydesmus Chamberlin, 1910
- Leonardesmus Shelley & Shear, 2006
- Nearctodesmus Silvestri, 1910
