= C5H10O2 =

The molecular formula C_{5}H_{10}O_{2} (molar mass: 102.13 g/mol) may refer to:

- tert-Butyl formate
- Ethyl propionate
- Hydroxypivaldehyde
- Isobutyl formate
- Isopropyl acetate
- Methylbutanoic acids
  - 2-Methylbutanoic acid
    - (2R)-2-Methylbutanoic acid
    - (2S)-2-Methylbutanoic acid
  - 3-Methylbutanoic acid (isovaleric acid)
- Methyl butyrate
- Methyl isobutyrate
- Pivalic acid
- Propyl acetate
- Tetrahydrofurfuryl alcohol
- Valeric acid
