= Fuhrmannodesmidae =

Scientific classification
- Kingdom: Animalia
- Phylum: Arthropoda
- Subphylum: Myriapoda
- Class: Diplopoda
- Order: Polydesmida
- Family: Fuhrmannodesmidae; Brolemann, 1916

Family of millipedes

Fuhrmannodesmidae is a family of millipedes belonging to the order Polydesmida. Many authorities now deem Fuhrmannodesmidae to be a junior synonym for Trichopolydesmidae, but some references still accept Fuhrmannodesmidae as a valid family. The family Fuhrmannodesmidae includes over 50 genera.

This family includes three species (Hexadesmus lateridens, Agenodesmus reticulatus, and Eutynellus flavior) notable for being among the very few species in this order to feature adults with only 18 segments (including the telson) rather than the 20 segments usually found in polydesmids. This family also includes several genera (e.g., Cyclopsodesmus, Cylindrogonus, and Leigonopus) notable for featuring sexual dimorphism in segment number: adult females in these genera have the usual 20 segments, but adult males have only 19. Millipedes in these species arrive at these lower numbers of segments by going through the same stages of teloanamorphosis observed in other polydesmids until reaching maturity, which occurs one moult earlier for 19 segments or two moults earlier for 18 segments.

== Genera ==
- Adisia
- Agenodesmus
- Assamodesmus
- Bactrodesmus
- Brachycerodesmus
- Cachania
- Caramba
- Chilaphrodesmus
- Chirripeckia
- Coonoorophilus
- Cryptogonodesmus
- Cutervodesmus
- Cyclopsodesmus
- Cylindrogonus
- Dendrobrachypus
- Eburodesmus
- Elgonicola
- Enantiogonus
- Esperanzella
- Eutynellus
- Fuhrmannodesmus
- Giustoella
- Glenniea
- Gyrophallus
- Hemisphaeroparia
- Heterosphaeroparia
- Hexadesmus
- Hingstonia
- Hypsiloporus
- Irazunus
- Irogonus
- Kukkalodesmus
- Lankadesmus
- Leiogonopus
- Mabocus
- Magidesmus
- Mecistoparia
- Megaloparia
- Nasodesmus
- Olmodesmus
- Oodedesmus
- Ootacadesmus
- Pachygonopus
- Phaneromerium
- Phreatodesmus
- Phylacomerium
- Physetoparia
- Pichitaria
- Pozodesmus
- Pseudosphaeroparia
- Salvadoria
- Schizotelopus
- Sholaphilus
- Sphaeroparia
- Sumidero
- Topalodesmus
- Trematodesmus
- Trichozonus
- Tylogoneus
- Typhlopygmaeosoma
- Venezuelodesmus
