= Opisthocheiron =

Scientific classification
- Kingdom: Animalia
- Phylum: Arthropoda
- Subphylum: Myriapoda
- Class: Diplopoda
- Order: Chordeumatida
- Family: Opisthocheiridae
- Genus: Opisthocheiron; Ribaut, 1913

Type species
- Opisthocheiron penicillatum Ribaut, 1913

Genus of millipedes

Opisthocheiron is a genus of millipedes in the family Opisthocheiridae. These millipedes are found in France and Spain. The French entomologist Henri Ribaut created this genus in 1913 to contain the newly discovered type species Opisthocheiron penicillatum. This genus also includes the cave-dwelling species Opisthocheiron canayerensis, notable as one of only a few species in the order Chordeumatida with only 26 segments in adults (counting the collum as the first segment and the telson as the last), four fewer segments than typically found in adults in this order.

== Species ==
This genus contains six species:

- Opisthocheiron canayerensis Mauriès & Goeffrey, 1982
- Opisthocheiron cornutum Ribaut, 1922
- Opisthocheiron elegans Ribaut, 1922
- Opisthocheiron fallax Ribaut, 1922
- Opisthocheiron lacazei Brölemann, 1932
- Opisthocheiron penicillatum Ribaut, 1913
