= Xystrosoma =

Scientific classification
- Kingdom: Animalia
- Phylum: Arthropoda
- Subphylum: Myriapoda
- Class: Diplopoda
- Order: Chordeumatida
- Family: Chamaesomatidae
- Genus: Xystrosoma; Ribaut, 1927

Type species
- Xystrosoma tectosagum Ribaut, 1927

Genus of millipedes

Xystrosoma is a genus of millipede in the family Chamaesomatidae. The French zoologist Henri Ribaut first described this genus in 1927 to contain five species newly discovered in France, including the type species X. tectosagum. This genus now includes ten species.

== Distribution ==
Most species in this genus are found in the French Pyrenees. Three species in this genus are found in northern Spain: two species found in the autonomous community of Catalonia (X. coiffati and X. santllorence) and one species found in the Basque autonomous community (X. vasconicum). One species in this genus is found in northern Portugal (X. lusitanicum).

== Description ==
Adult millipedes in this genus can have 26, 28, or 30 segments (counting the collum as the first segment and the telson as the last). This genus includes three species notable for featuring an unusual number of segments: The Spanish species X. santllorence is one of only a few species in the order Chordeumatida with only 26 segments in adults, four fewer than the 30 segments typically found in adults this order. The French species X. beatense and the Spanish species X. vasconicum are notable for featuring sexual dimorphism in segment number, with the usual 30 segments in adult females but only 28 segments in adult males. Adults in the other seven species in this genus feature the usual 30 segments in each sex.

In males in the order Chordeumatida, the eighth leg pair become anterior gonopods, and the ninth leg pair become posterior gonopods. In this genus, the anterior gonopods are deeply divided transversely into anterior and posterior parts: A pair of elongated angiocoxites form the anterior part, and the colpocoxite forms the center of the posterior part. In most species in this genus, a pair of telopodites frame the colpocoxite, with these telopodites taking the form of robust stems.

The genus Xystrosoma shares an extensive set of traits with Chamaesoma, a closely related genus in the family Chamaesomatidae. These shared traits place these two genera in the same subfamily (Chamaesomatinae). For example, the head and dorsal surface of the trunk in both genera are covered with small lamellae arranged as vertical plates oriented longitudinally. Furthermore, species in both genera are small and feature paranota located in a more ventral position than observed in other genera in the same family.

The males in these two genera also develop similar modifications to their legs. For example, the anterior gonopods in both genera feature angiocoxites in front that are separate rather than fused, a colpocoxite toward the rear that is undivided rather than divided in the middle, and no flagella. Furthermore, in both genera, the posterior gonopods feature a coxa with a medial process and a telepodite with two segments, including a minute distal segment. Moreover, the eleventh leg pair in males of both genera feature coxal hooks.

The millipedes in the genus Xystrosoma can be distinguished from their close relatives in the genus Chamaesoma based on other traits. For example, the dorsal lamellae are rounded and shaped like semicircles in Xystrosoma, but these lamellae are pointed and shaped like triangles in Chamaesoma. Furthermore, the fifth segment of each antenna is as wide as long in Chamaesoma, but this segment is longer than wide in Xystrosoma.

== Species ==
This genus includes the following species:

- Xystrosoma beatense Ribaut, 1927
- Xystrosoma cassagnaui Mauriès, 1965
- Xystrosoma catalonicum Ribaut, 1927
- Xystrosoma coiffaiti Mauriès, 1964
- Xystrosoma lusitanicum Mauriès, 2015
- Xystrosoma murinum Ribaut, 1927
- Xystrosoma pyrenaicum Ribaut, 1927
- Xystrosoma santllorence Serra & Mauriès, 2018
- Xystrosoma tectosagum Ribaut, 1927
- Xystrosoma vasconicum Mauriès & Barraqueta, 1985
