= Chamaesoma =

Scientific classification
- Kingdom: Animalia
- Phylum: Arthropoda
- Subphylum: Myriapoda
- Class: Diplopoda
- Order: Chordeumatida
- Family: Chamaesomatidae
- Genus: Chamaesoma; Ribaut & Verhoeff, 1913
- Species: C. broelemanni

Binomial name
- Chamaesoma broelemanni Ribaut & Verhoeff, 1913

Genus of millipede

Chamaesoma is a monotypic genus of millipede in the family Chamaesomatidae, and Chamaesoma broelemanni is the only species in this genus. This millipede is notable as one of only a few species in the order Chordeumatida with only 26 segments in adults (counting the collum as the first segment and the telson as the last), four fewer segments than typically found in adults this order. This species is found in France and Luxembourg.

== Discovery ==
The genus Chamaesoma and its only species were first described by the German zoologist Karl W. Verhoeff in 1913. He based the original description of this genus and this species on 71 specimens (50 females and 21 males) found by the French zoologists Henri Brölemann and Henri Ribaut under wet leaf litter near the commune of Saint-Béat in the department of Haute-Garonne in the Pyrenees in France. These type specimens are deposited in the Muséum National d’Histoire Naturelle in Paris.

== Distribution and habitat ==
This species is present in Luxembourg as well as distributed across most of France, from the French Pyrenees and the Massif Central in the south to as far north as Normandy and Lorraine. Since the discovery of this species in Haute-Garonne in France, this millipede has been recorded in other departments in the Pyrenees, including Hautes-Pyrénées, Ariège, Aude, and Pyrénées-Orientales, as well as elsewhere in France, including Tarn, Aveyron, Puy-de-Dôme, Calvados, Loiret, Meuse, and Vosges. In the Loiret department, specimens were found in the Forest of Orléans among oak (Quercus petraea and Q. robur) and hornbeam trees (Carpinus betulus).

== Description ==
This millipede ranges from brown to gray. This species is notable for its small size: Adult males are only 3.25 mm long, and adult females only 4 mm long. This millipede is also one of only a few species in the order Chordeumatida with only 26 segments in adults, the minimum number recorded in this order. Accordingly, the adult female of this species has only 42 pairs of legs, and the adult male has only 40 pairs of walking legs, excluding the eighth and ninth leg pairs, which become gonopods.

Like other millipedes in the family Chamaesomatidae, Chamaesoma features small paranota. Like most other genera in this family, this genus also features anterior gonopods with well developed telepodites. In this genus, these telepodites are long, smooth, and curved. Unlike most other genera in the same family, however, this genus features body pigmentation.

This genus shares an especially extensive set of traits with Xystrosoma, another genus in the same family. These shared traits place these two genera in the same subfamily (Chamaesomatinae). For example, the head and dorsal surface of the trunk in both genera are covered with small lamellae arranged as vertical plates oriented longitudinally.

The males in these two genera also develop similar modifications to their legs. For example, the anterior gonopods in both genera feature angiocoxites in front that are separate rather than fused, a colpocoxite toward the rear that is undivided rather than divided in the middle, and no flagella. The posterior gonopods in both genera feature a coxa with a medial process and a telepodite with two segments, including a minute distal segment. Furthermore, the eleventh leg pair in males of both genera feature coxal hooks.

The millipedes in the genus Chamaesoma can be distinguished from the species in the genus Xystrosoma, however, based on other traits. For example, the dorsal lamellae are pointed and shaped like triangles in Chamaesoma, but these lamellae are rounded and shaped like semicircles in Xystrosoma. Furthermore, the fifth segment of each antenna is as wide as long in Chamaesoma, but this segment is longer than wide in Xystrosoma.

== Development ==
The species C. broelemanni arrives at a lower number of segments and legs through a process of post-embryonic development that deviates from the anamorphosis usually observed in the order Chordeumatida. Like other species in this order, C. broelemanni is teloanamorphic, adding segments and legs through a series of molts until the adult stage, when the molting stops and the adult emerges with a final number of segments and legs. This species, however, reaches maturity and stops molting one stage earlier, in the eighth stage rather than in a ninth stage. Furthermore, C. broelemanni conforms to the pattern usually observed in most species of Chordeumatida only through the first five stages, then adds one fewer segment than usual upon entering the sixth and seventh stages. Thus, in this process, C. broelemanni goes through stages of development with 6, 8, 11, 15, 19, 22, and 24 segments, before emerging as an adult with 26 segments in the final stage.

This process is the same as that observed in the species Opisthocheiron canayerensis, one of the other species in the order Chordeumatida with only 26 segments in adults, but with one difference. In C. broelemanni, the transformation of legs into gonopods in the male begins in the sixth stage and continues until the eighth and final stage. In O. canayerensis, however, this process does not begin until the seventh stage.
