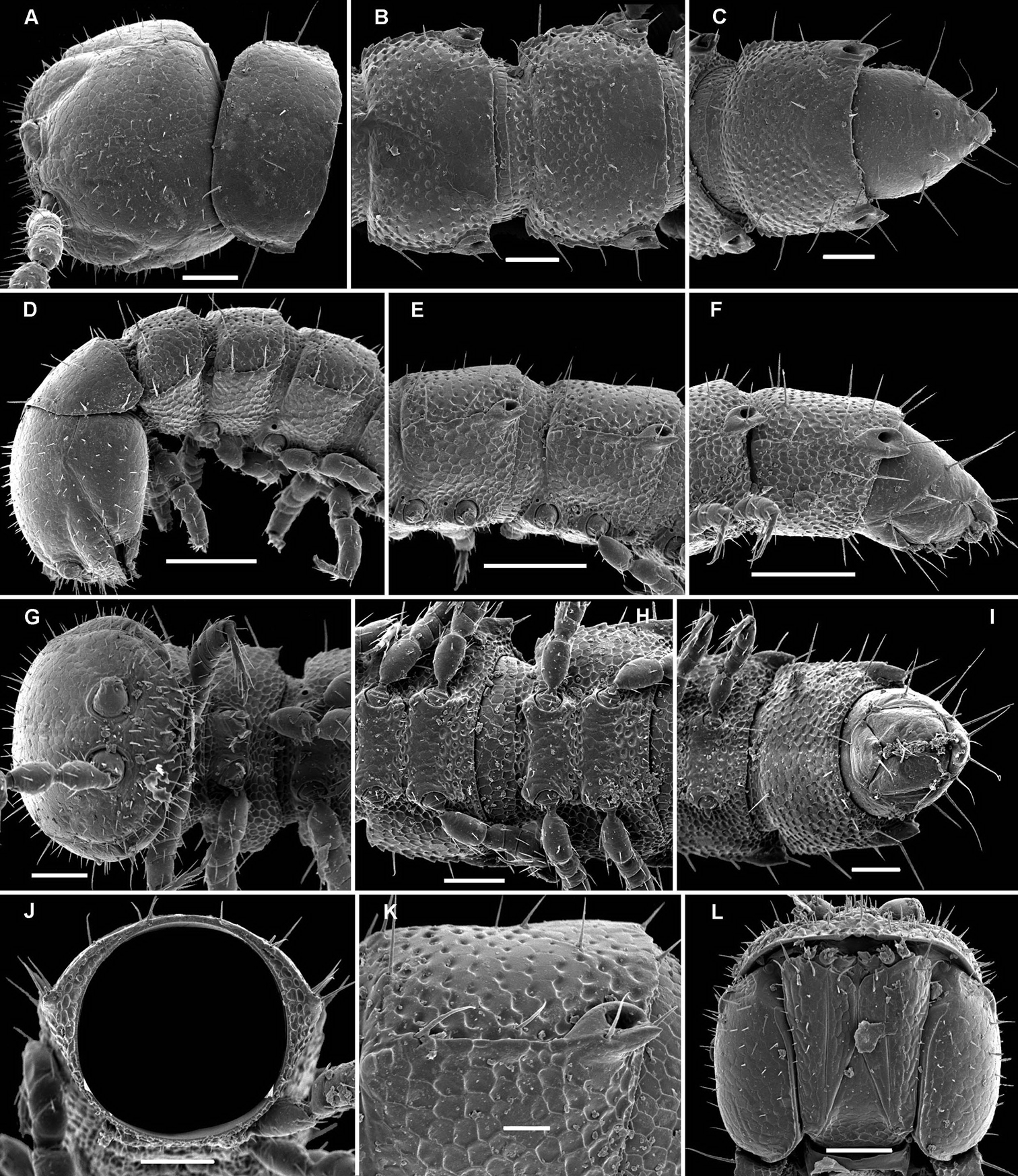
- Images of a D. bedosae male

Scientific classification
- Kingdom: Animalia
- Phylum: Arthropoda
- Subphylum: Myriapoda
- Class: Diplopoda
- Order: Polydesmida
- Family: Trichopolydesmidae
- Genus: Deharvengius; Golovatch, Geoffroy & VandenSpiegel, 2013
- Species: D. bedosae

Binomial name
- Deharvengius bedosae Golovatch, Geoffroy & VandenSpiegel, 2013

= Deharvengius =

Genus of millipede

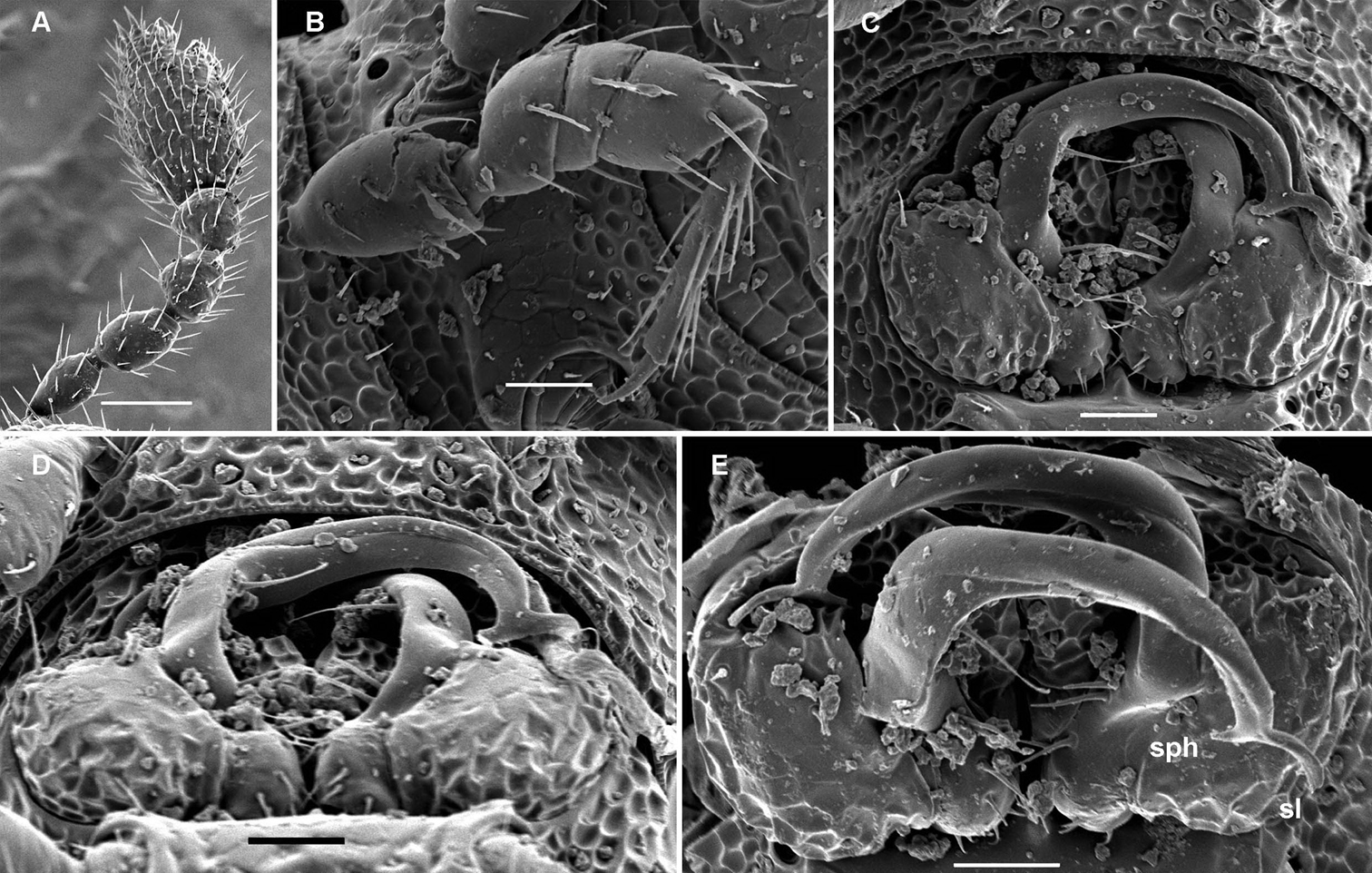
Images of a D. bedosae male, with views of (A) an antenna, (B) a leg, and (C-E) gonopods, including a solenophore (sph) and a solenomere (sl)

Deharvengius is a monotypic genus of flat-backed millipede in the family Trichopolydesmidae, and Deharvengius bedosae is the only species in this genus. This millipede is notable as one of the very few species in the order Polydesmida to feature adults with only 18 segments (counting the collum as the first segment and the telson as the last) rather than the 20 segments usually found in this order. This species is found in Vietnam.

== Discovery ==
This genus and its type species were first described in 2014 by the biologists Sergei Golovatch, Jean-Jacques Geoffroy, and Didier VandenSpiegel. They based the original description of this genus and its only species on a male holotype and twelve paratypes (three males, four females, and five juveniles). This genus and this species are named in honor of the biologists Louis Deharveng and Anne Bedos of the Muséum National d’Histoire Naturelle in Paris. Deharveng and Bedos extracted the type specimens from soil collected in 2008 in the district of Kien Luong in Kien Giang province in Vietnam. The holotype and nine paratypes are deposited in the Muséum National d’Histoire Naturelle, and one male paratype is deposited in the Zoological Museum of the State University of Moscow.

== Description ==
The adults of this species measure about 3 mm in length and feature only 18 segments in each sex. These millipedes are uniformly pale with a surface that is dull and often almost translucent. The head in each sex is flattened. The antennae are short and shaped like clubs, with the sixth segment of each antenna abruptly and especially enlarged.

The dorsal surface of each segment features three transverse rows of long tergal setae, with two pairs of simple pointed setae per row on each segment following the collum. The ozopores are shaped like ovals and arranged according to the normal pore formula for millipedes in the order Polydesmida, with pores on segments 5, 7, 9, 10, 12, 13, and from 15 to the penultimate segment. The paranota are very poorly developed and reduced to delicate serrate ridges along the lateral edges with sharp teeth at the rear corners of segments with pores. With only 18 segments, adult females feature only 27 pairs of legs, whereas adult males feature 26 pairs of walking legs (excluding the eighth leg pair, which become gonopods). The legs in D. bedosae are short and feature claws that are simple and slightly curved.

The telopodite (distal element) of each gonopod is clearly exposed rather than hidden in a cavity, but these telopodites are pressed close against the ventral surface. Each telopodite is slender, curved into a semicircle, and directed laterally toward the opposite side so that they cross one another and overlap. Neither a groove nor a ridge separates the basal (prefemoral) half of each telopodite from the acropodite (the distal half). Each telopodite features two branches at the distal end, a small solenophore and a longer solenomere. The solenomere is simple, slender, and shaped like a curved spine. The seminal groove runs mostly along the ventral and lateral surface of the obviously twisted acropodite to terminate at the distal end of the solenomere.

This millipede exhibits many traits commonly observed in the family Trichopolydesmidae. For example, like all known species in this family, this millipede features segments with three transverse rows of tergal setae. Furthermore, this millipede also exhibits the normal pore formula usually observed in this family. Moreover, as in most species in this family, the seminal groove in the males of this species terminates distally on a separate branch (solenomere) of the telopodite.

Several unusual traits, however, distinguish this genus from most other genera in the same family. For example, this genus is exceptional in featuring only 18 segments in each sex. Furthermore, this genus is unusual in featuring only four rather than six tergal setae in each transverse row, and the head in this genus is less convex than usually observed in this family. Moreover, the gonopods in this genus are very distinctive, with long simple telopodites curved into crossing semicircles.
