= Nasodesmus =

Scientific classification
- Kingdom: Animalia
- Phylum: Arthropoda
- Subphylum: Myriapoda
- Class: Diplopoda
- Order: Polydesmida
- Family: Fuhrmannodesmidae
- Genus: Nasodesmus; Cook, 1896
- Species: N. cognatus

Binomial name
- Nasodesmus cognatus (Humbert, 1865)

Synonyms
- Lankadesmus cognatus (Humbert, 1865); Polydesmus cognatus Humbert, 1865

Genus of myriapods

Nasodesmus cognatus is a species of millipede in the family Fuhrmannodesmidae. It is endemic to Sri Lanka. It is the only species in the genus Nasodesmus.
