= Chamaesomatidae =

Scientific classification
- Kingdom: Animalia
- Phylum: Arthropoda
- Subphylum: Myriapoda
- Class: Diplopoda
- Order: Chordeumatida
- Superfamily: Brannerioidea
- Family: Chamaesomatidae

Family of millipedes

Chamaesomatidae is a family of millipedes belonging to the order Chordeumatida. This family contains 28 species distributed among 11 genera. These millipedes are found in Europe and North Africa.

== Description ==
These millipedes range from 3.3 mm to 12 mm in length. Many species dwell in caves. The paranota are small and humplike. Adult millipedes in this family have 26, 28, or 30 segments (counting the collum as the first segment and the telson as the last). This family includes the species Chamaesoma broelemanni and Xystrosoma santllorence, notable as two of only a few chordeumatidan species with only 26 segments in adults, four fewer segments than typically found in adults in this order. Most genera in this family lack pigment.

Adult males in this family feature anterior gonopods derived from the eighth leg pair and posterior gonopods derived from the ninth leg pair. The anterior gonopods each include a basal element, the angiocoxite, which is derived from the base (coxa) of the eighth leg pair, and a distal element located toward the side and the rear, the telopodite, which is usually well developed, as well as another structure toward the rear, the colpocoxite, which some authorities believe to be permanently extruded and sclerotized walls of the coxal gland. The anterior gonopods sometimes feature flagella. The posterior gonopods each feature a telepodite with either one or two segments. The eleventh pair of legs in adult males usually feature coxal hooks.

== Genera ==
This family includes 11 genera:

- Asturasoma Mauriès, 1982
- Chamaesoma Ribaut & Verhoeff, 1913
- Coiffaiteuma Mauriès, 1964
- Krauseuma Mauriès & Barraqueta, 1985
- Marboreuma Mauriès, 1988
- Meinerteuma Mauriès, 1982
- Origmatogona Ribaut, 1913
- Scutogona Ribaut, 1913
- Vascosoma Ribaut, 1966
- Verhoeffeuma Strasser, 1937
- Xystrosoma Ribaut, 1927
