= Opisthocheiridae =

Scientific classification
- Kingdom: Animalia
- Phylum: Arthropoda
- Subphylum: Myriapoda
- Class: Diplopoda
- Order: Chordeumatida
- Superfamily: Cleidogonoidea
- Family: Opisthocheiridae

Family of millipedes

Opisthocheiridae is a family of millipedes belonging to the order Chordeumatida. This family includes 40 species distributed among seven genera. These millipedes are found in western Europe and Morocco.

== Description ==
Millipedes in this family range from 5 mm to 16 mm in length. The paranota are small humps and hardly developed sometimes. The posterior gonopods have from one to three segments. Adult millipedes in this family have 26 or 30 segments (counting the collum as the first segment and the telson as the last). This family includes the cave-dwelling species Opisthocheiron canayerensis, notable as one of only a few chordeumatidan species with only 26 segments in adults, four fewer segments than typically found in adults in this order.

== Genera ==
This family includes seven genera:

- Brachytropisoma Silvestri, 1898
- Ceratosphys Ribaut, 1920
- Hispaniosoma Ribaut, 1913
- Marquetia Ribaut, 1905
- Marquetiella Jeekel, 1969
- Opisthocheiron Ribaut, 1913
- Sireuma Reboleira & Enghoff, 2014
