= Pocockia sapiens =

Scientific classification
- Domain: Eukaryota
- Kingdom: Animalia
- Phylum: Arthropoda
- Subphylum: Myriapoda
- Class: Diplopoda
- Order: Chordeumatida
- Family: Metopidiotrichidae
- Genus: Pocockia; Silvestri, 1895
- Species: P. sapiens

Binomial name
- Pocockia sapiens Silvestri, 1895

Genus of arthropods

Pocockia is a monotypic genus of millipedes belonging to the family Metopidiotrichidae. It contains one species, Pocockia sapiens Silvestri, 1895.
