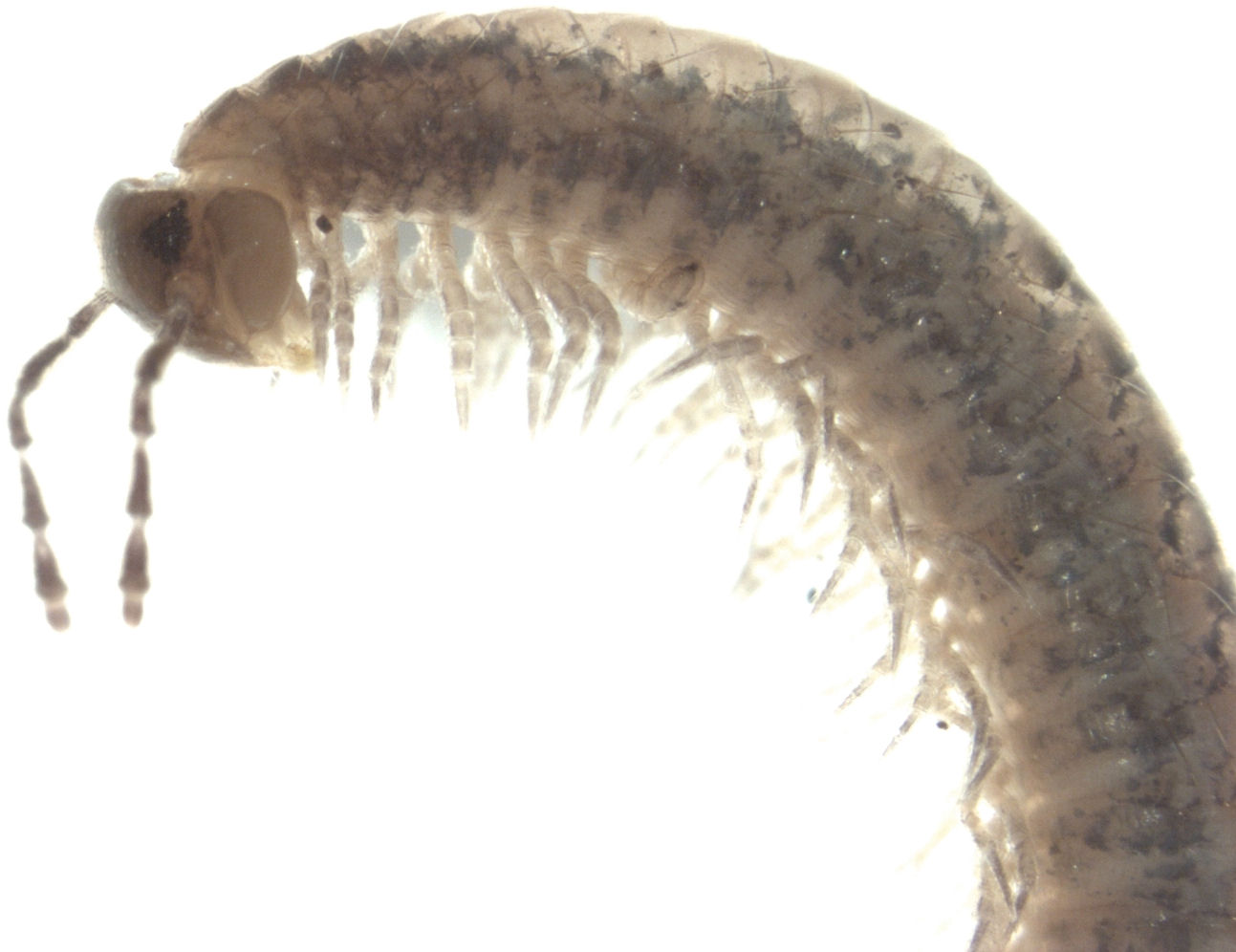
- Schedotrigona

Scientific classification
- Kingdom: Animalia
- Phylum: Arthropoda
- Subphylum: Myriapoda
- Class: Diplopoda
- Order: Chordeumatida
- Suborder: Heterochordeumatidea
- Superfamily: Heterochordeumatoidea
- Family: Metopidiotrichidae

= Metopidiotrichidae =

Family of millipedes

Metopidiotrichidae is a family of millipedes in the order Chordeumatida. This family includes more than 70 species. These millipedes are found in Indochina, Australia, and on Pacific islands from New Zealand to Japan.

== Description ==
Millipedes in this family range from 4 mm to 17 mm in length. The paranota take the form of small bulges or distinct keels. Adult millipedes in this family have 32 segments (counting the collum as the first segment and the telson as the last), not the 30 segments usually found in this order. Either the anterior or the posterior gonopods can feature flagella, but never both pairs. Adult males in this family often feature modifications to the head, antennae, and legs adjacent to the gonopods. In particular, adult males often feature a reduced or vestigial leg pair 10 as part of the gonopod complex (e.g., Reginaterreuma monroei, R. daviesae, R. unicolor, R. major, and Neocambrisoma raveni), in addition to the two leg pairs (pairs 8 and 9) typically modified into gonopods in this order.

== Genera ==
The family Metopidiotrichidae includes the following nine genera:

- Australeuma Golovatch, 1986
- Malayothrix Verhoeff, 1929
- Metopidiothrix Attems, 1907
- Neocambrisoma Mauriès, 1987
- Nesiothrix Shear & Mesibov, 1997
- Nipponothrix Shear & Tanabe, 1994
- Pocockia Silvestri, 1895
- Reginaterreuma Mauriès, 1987
- Schedotrigona Silvestri, 1903
