= Kepolydesmus =

Scientific classification
- Kingdom: Animalia
- Phylum: Arthropoda
- Subphylum: Myriapoda
- Class: Diplopoda
- Order: Polydesmida
- Family: Nearctodesmidae
- Genus: Kepolydesmus; Chamberlin, 1910

Genus of millipedes

Kepolydesmus is a genus of flat-backed millipedes in the family Nearctodesmidae. There are at least four described species in Kepolydesmus.

== Species ==
These four species belong to the genus Kepolydesmus:

- Kepolydesmus anderisus (Chamberlin, 1910)
- Kepolydesmus hesperus Chamberlin, 1949
- Kepolydesmus mimus Chamberlin, 1947
- Kepolydesmus pungo Chamberlin, 1949
