= Australeuma =

Scientific classification
- Domain: Eukaryota
- Kingdom: Animalia
- Phylum: Arthropoda
- Subphylum: Myriapoda
- Class: Diplopoda
- Order: Chordeumatida
- Family: Metopidiotrichidae
- Genus: Australeuma; Golovatch, 1986

Species
- See text

Genus of millipedes

Australeuma is a genus of Tasmanian millipede in the family Metopidiotrichidae.

== Species ==
The following species are recognised within this genus:

- Australeuma gladifer Shear & Mesibov, 1997
- Australeuma golovatchi Shear & Mesibov, 1997
- Australeuma jeekeli Golovatch, 1986
- Australeuma mauriesi Shear & Mesibov, 1997
- Australeuma peckorum Shear & Mesibov, 1997
- Australeuma simile Golovatch, 1986
