= Methylbutanoic acid =

Methylbutanoic acid may refer to:

- 2-Methylbutanoic acid
- 3-Methylbutanoic acid

== See also ==
- Methyl butanoate
