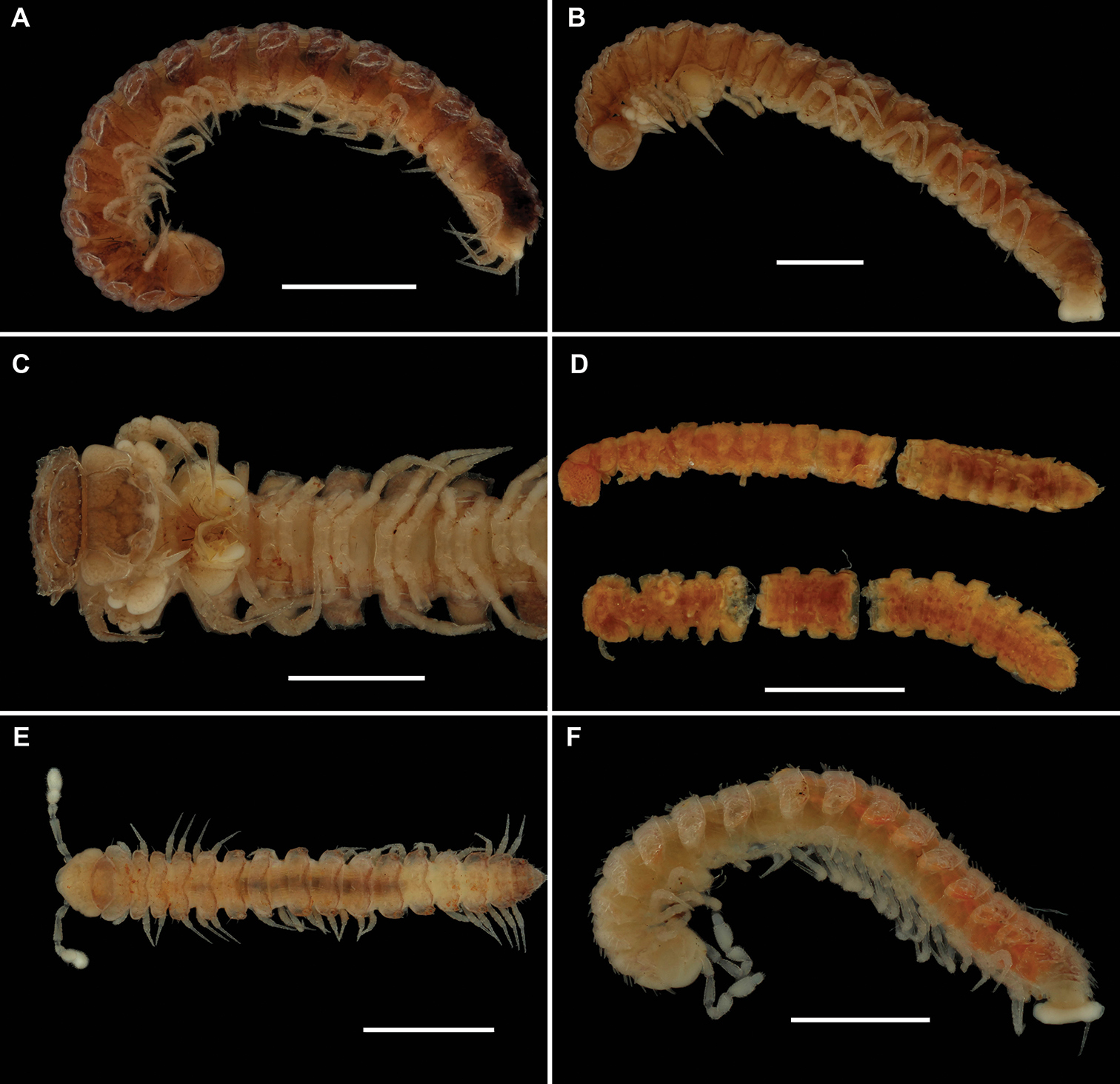
- (Scale view 1mm)

Scientific classification
- Kingdom: Animalia
- Phylum: Arthropoda
- Subphylum: Myriapoda
- Class: Diplopoda
- Order: Polydesmida
- Family: Trichopolydesmidae; Verhoeff, 1910

= Trichopolydesmidae =

Family of myriapods

Trichopolydesmidae is a family of millipedes in the order Polydesmida. Some authorities deem this family to include Fuhrmannodesmidae, Mastigonodesmidae, Macrosternodesmidae, and Nearctodesmidae as junior synonyms. Others adopt narrower definitions of this family, for example, including only Fuhrmannodesmidae and Mastigonodesmidae as synonyms.

Under the broader definition, this family includes about 140 species distributed among about 75 genera. These species are found mainly in the Northern Hemisphere, especially in the tropics but also in temperate regions. About 80 species and 55 genera are tropical, whereas about 60 species and 20 genera are Holarctic.

== Description ==
Millipedes in this family (broadly defined) are small, ranging from 2 mm to 20 mm in length. These millipedes have 18, 19, or 20 segments, counting the collum as the first segment and the telson as the last. This family includes two genera (Galliocookia and Occitanocookia) notable for featuring sexual dimorphism in segment number: Adult females in these genera have the 20 segments usually found in this order, but adult males have only 19. This family also includes the species Deharvengius bedosae, notable for being among the very few species in this order to feature adults with only 18 segments rather than the 20 segments usually found in polydesmids.

== Genera ==
Some authorities include the following genera in this family:

- Adisia Golovatch, 1994
- Aporodesmella Golovatch, Geoffroy & VandenSpiegel, 2014
- Bacillidesmus Attems, 1898
- Bactrodesmus Cook, 1896
- Balkanodesminus Antić, Vagalinski, Stoev & Akkari, 2022
- Balkanodesmus Antić & Reip, 2014
- Banatodesmus Tabacaru, 1980
- Cachania Schubart, 1955
- Caucasodesmus Golovatch, 1985
- Cottodesmus Verhoeff, 1936
- Deharvengius Golovatch, Geoffroy & VandenSpiegel, 2013
- Eburodesmus Schubart, 1955
- Enantiogonus Loomis, 1961
- Esperanzella Kraus, 1960
- Eutynellus Chamberlin, 1940
- Galliocookia Ribaut, 1955
- Gonatodesmus Golovatch, Geoffroy & VandenSpiegel, 2013
- Haplocookia Brölemann, 1915
- Harpogonopus Loomis, 1960
- Helicodesmus Golovatch, Geoffroy & VandenSpiegel, 2014
- Hemisphaeroparia Schubart, 1955
- Ingurtidorgius Strasser, 1974
- Mastigonodesmus Silvestri, 1898
- Mauritacantha Mauriès & Geoffroy, 1999
- Mecistoparia Brölemann, 1926
- Monstrodesmus Golovatch, Geoffroy & VandenSpiegel, 2014
- Napocodesmus Ceuca, 1974
- Occitanocookia Mauriès, 1980
- Physetoparia Brölemann, 1920
- Rhodopodesmus Antić, Vagalinski, Stoev & Akkari, 2022
- Sakophallus Chamberlin, 1941
- Simplogonopus Vagalinski, Golovatch, Akkari & Stoev, 2019
- Solentanodesmus Antić, Reip, Dražina, Rađa & Makarov, 2014
- Sphaeroparia Attems, 1909
- Trichopolydesmus Verhoeff, 1898
- Trilobodesmus Golovatch & Mauriès, 2007
- Velebitodesmus Antić, Reip, Dražina, Rađa & Makarov, 2014
- Verhoeffodesmus Strasser, 1959
