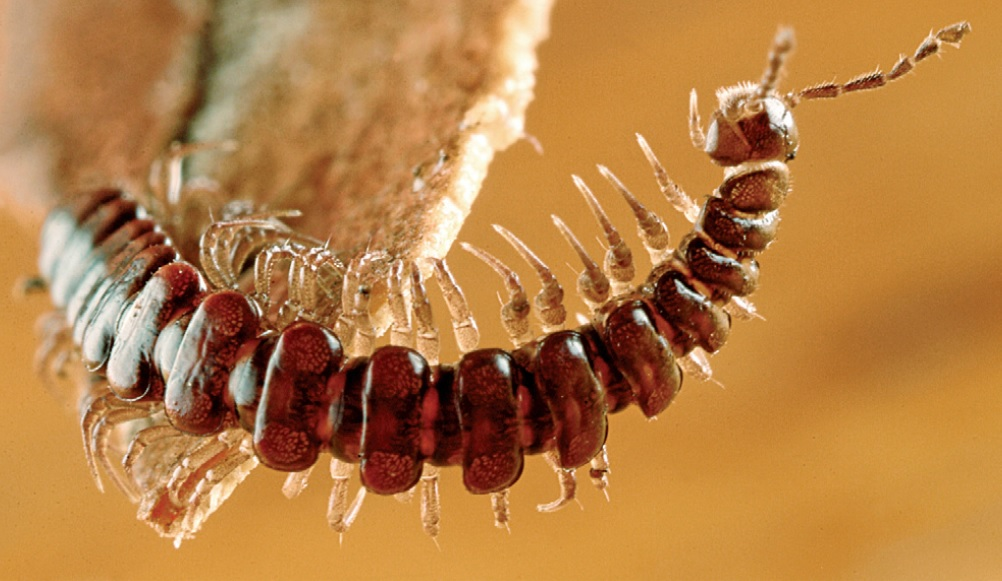
- Tasmaniosoma armatum, Tasmania

Scientific classification
- Kingdom: Animalia
- Phylum: Arthropoda
- Subphylum: Myriapoda
- Class: Diplopoda
- Order: Polydesmida
- Suborder: Dalodesmidea
- Family: Dalodesmidae; Cook, 1896

Genera
- See text

= Dalodesmidae =

Family of millipedes

Dalodesmidae is a family of millipedes in the order Polydesmida, containing at least 250 species found in the Southern Hemisphere.

== Distribution ==
Species of Dalodesmidae are found in Australia (over 100 species), Madagascar, New Caledonia, New Zealand, South Africa, and southern South America (Chile and southern Brazil).

== Classification ==
Dalodesmidae is one of the major families of the order Polydesmida, with at least 55 genera and 250 species (with some estimates up to 340 species). It is related to the small family Vaalogonopodidae (8 species) with which it forms the suborder Dalodesmidea.

The taxonomy is based mainly on the structure of the male gonopods. Below is the list of species as of January 2014.

- Abatodesmus
- Allawrencius
- Anthogonopus
- Antisoma
- Asphalidesmus
- Atalopharetra
- Atopodesmus
- Atrophotergum
- Blysmopeltis
- Broelemannosoma
- Bromodesmus
- Canacophilus
- Chiliosoma
- Cyphomeskelus
- Dalodesmus
- Dasystigma
- Dendrocaffrus
- Dityloura
- Doryskelus
- Drakensius
- Eparmatolophus
- Erythrodemus
- Eutubercularium
- Gasterogramma
- Gephyrodesmus
- Ginglymodesmus
- Gnomeskelus
- Gonokollesis
- Harpethrix
- Hemiphygoxerotes
- Icosidesmus
- Ischnocaffrus
- Kuschelodesmus
- Lissodesmus
- Microporus
- Mikroporus
- Monenchodesmus
- Notonaia
- Notonesiotes
- Oeciaconus
- Orthorhachis
- Pacificosoma
- Paredrodesmus
- Paurodesmus
- Pelmatotylus
- Peninsularia
- Perbrinckiella
- Philocaffrus
- Platytarropus
- Platytarrus
- Pleonarius
- Pristomeskelus
- Procophorella
- Pseudoprionopeltis
- Pseudothelydesmus
- Queenslandesmus
- Rhopaloskelus
- Schubartina
- Semnosoma
- Sphaerotrichopus
- Stenauchenia
- Tasmaniosoma
- Tasmanopeltis
- Tongodesmus
- Trematocaffrus
- Trienchodesmus
- Tubercularium
- Tzitzikamina
- Vanhoeffenia
- Victoriombrus
