= Anamorphosis (biology) =

Postembryonic development in Arthropoda that adds segments during moults

Anamorphosis or anamorphogenesis is the process of postembryonic development and moulting in Arthropoda that results in the addition of abdominal body segments, even after sexual maturity. Examples of this mode of development occur in proturans and millipedes.

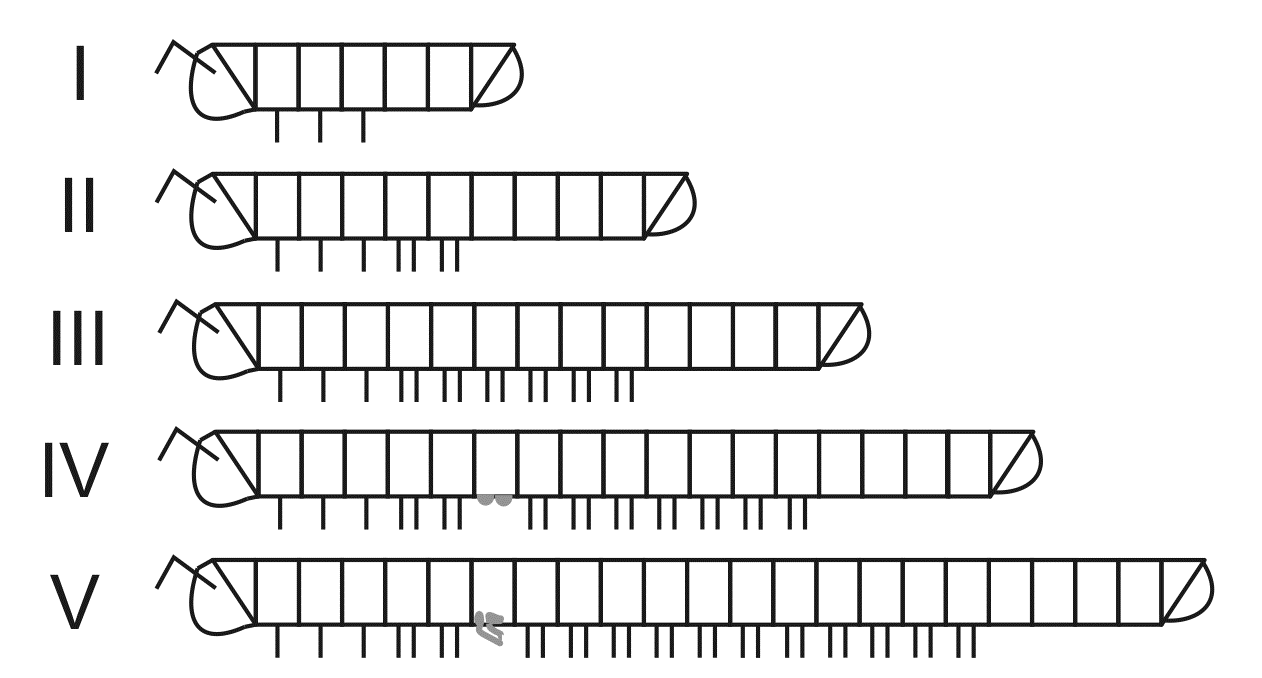
Anamorphic development in a generalized millipede that reaches maturity in stage V

Protura hatch with only eight abdominal segments and add the remaining three in subsequent moults.

In myriapods, euanamorphosis is the continual addition of new segments at each moult, without there being a fixed number of segments for the adult. Teloanamorphosis is a pattern in which moulting ceases once the adult has reached a fixed number of segments. In hemianamorphosis, a fixed number of segments is eventually attained, after which moulting continues, and pre-existing segments grow in size.
