= Robert Mesibov =

American–Australian zoologist

Robert Evan Mesibov
- Born: March 1946 (age 80)
- Education: University of Wisconsin–Madison (Ph.D); New York University (B.A.)
- Known for: Millipede taxonomy
- Scientific career
- Fields: Diplopodology
- Workplaces: Queen Victoria Museum and Art Gallery

Robert 'Bob' Evan Mesibov (born 9 March 1946) is an American born and educated Australian myriapod specialist. He earned a B.A. from New York University in 1966 and a Ph.D. in biochemistry from the University of Wisconsin–Madison in 1971.

He migrated to Australia in 1973, settling in Tasmania where he became a curatorial assistant at the Queen Victoria Museum and Art Gallery in Launceston. He became an Australian citizen in 1976.

== Work ==
His earliest publications were in the field of chemotaxis, but in 1990–1991, while working as a forest ecology and zoology consultant, he published his first zoological papers, on velvet worms in the family Peripatopsidae).

In later life he has become increasingly concerned with problems in digital databases, from concerns about inconsistencies and errors in aggregated databases, to problems with specimens' GPS coordinates.

His zoological author abbreviation is Mesibov. He has authored over a hundred taxa.

== See also ==
- Taxa named by Robert Mesibov
