= Opiona columbiana =

Scientific classification
- Kingdom: Animalia
- Phylum: Arthropoda
- Subphylum: Myriapoda
- Class: Diplopoda
- Order: Chordeumatida
- Family: Caseyidae
- Genus: Opiona
- Species: O. columbiana

Binomial name
- Opiona columbiana Chamberlin, 1951

Species of millipede

Opiona columbiana is a species of millipede in the family Caseyidae. It is found in North America.
