= Underwoodia iuloides =

Scientific classification
- Kingdom: Animalia
- Phylum: Arthropoda
- Subphylum: Myriapoda
- Class: Diplopoda
- Order: Chordeumatida
- Family: Caseyidae
- Genus: Underwoodia
- Species: U. iuloides

Binomial name
- Underwoodia iuloides (Harger, 1872)

Species of millipede

Underwoodia iuloides is a species of millipede in the family Caseyidae. It is found in North America.
