= Vasingtona =

Scientific classification
- Kingdom: Animalia
- Phylum: Arthropoda
- Subphylum: Myriapoda
- Class: Diplopoda
- Order: Chordeumatida
- Family: Caseyidae
- Genus: Vasingtona; Chamberlin, 1941

Genus of millipedes

Vasingtona is a genus of millipedes in the family Caseyidae. There is at least one described species in Vasingtona, V. irritans.
