= Opiona =

Scientific classification
- Kingdom: Animalia
- Phylum: Arthropoda
- Subphylum: Myriapoda
- Class: Diplopoda
- Order: Chordeumatida
- Family: Caseyidae
- Genus: Opiona; Chamberlin, 1951

Genus of millipedes

Opiona is a genus of millipedes in the family Caseyidae. There are about 16 described species in Opiona.

== Species ==
These 16 species belong to the genus Opiona:

- Opiona berryessae Gardner & Shelley, 1989
- Opiona bifurcata Gardner & Shelley, 1989
- Opiona casualis Gardner & Shelley, 1989
- Opiona columbiana Chamberlin, 1951
- Opiona communis Gardner & Shelley, 1989
- Opiona confusa Gardner & Shelley, 1989
- Opiona distincta Gardner & Shelley, 1989
- Opiona exigua Gardner & Shelley, 1989
- Opiona facetia Gardner & Shelley, 1989
- Opiona fisheri Gardner & Shelley, 1989
- Opiona goedeni Gardner & Shelley, 1989
- Opiona gonopods
- Opiona graeningi
- Opiona hatchi Causey, 1954
- Opiona scytonotoides Gardner & Shelley, 1989
- Opiona siliquae Causey, 1963
