= Underwoodia (millipede) =

Scientific classification
- Kingdom: Animalia
- Phylum: Arthropoda
- Subphylum: Myriapoda
- Class: Diplopoda
- Order: Chordeumatida
- Family: Caseyidae
- Genus: Underwoodia; Cook & Collins, 1895

Genus of millipedes

Underwoodia is a genus of millipedes in the family Caseyidae. There are at least three described species in Underwoodia.

== Species ==
These three species belong to the genus Underwoodia:

- Underwoodia iuloides (Harger, 1872)^{i c g b}
- Underwoodia kurtschevae Golovatch, 1980^{c g}
- Underwoodia tida Chamberlin, 1925^{i c g}

Data sources: i = ITIS, c = Catalogue of Life, g = GBIF, b = Bugguide.net
