= Caseyidae =

Scientific classification
- Domain: Eukaryota
- Kingdom: Animalia
- Phylum: Arthropoda
- Subphylum: Myriapoda
- Class: Diplopoda
- Order: Chordeumatida
- Superfamily: Caseyoidea
- Family: Caseyidae; Verhoeff, 1909

Family of millipedes

Caseyidae is a family of millipedes in the order Chordeumatida. Adult millipedes in this family have 30 segments (counting the collum as the first segment and the telson as the last). There are about 7 genera and at least 40 described species in Caseyidae.

== Genera ==
- Caseya Cook & Collins, 1895
- Metopiona Gardner & Shelley, 1989
- Ochrogramma Gardner & Shelley, 1989
- Opiona Chamberlin, 1951
- Speoseya Causey, 1954
- Underwoodia Cook & Collins, 1895
- Vasingtona Chamberlin, 1941
