= List of Xystodesmidae genera =

This is a list of 80 genera in Xystodesmidae, a family of flat-backed millipedes in the order Polydesmida.

== Xystodesmidae genera ==
- Anombrocheir Buckett & Gardner, 1969^{i c g}
- Apheloria Chamberlin, 1921^{i c g b}
- Boraria Chamberlin, 1943^{i c g b}
- Brachoria Chamberlin, 1939^{i c g b} (Appalachian mimic millipedes)
- Brevigonus Shelley, 1980^{i c g}
- Caralinda Hoffman, 1978^{i c g}
- Cheiropus Loomis, 1944^{i}
- Cherokia Chamberlin, 1949^{i c g b}
- Chonaphe Cook, 1904^{i c g b}
- Cibularia ^{c g}
- Cleptoria Chamberlin, 1939^{i c g}
- Croatania Shelley, 1977^{i c g}
- Cruzodesmus ^{c g}
- Cyphonaria ^{c g}
- Deltotaria Causey, 1942^{i c g}
- Devillea ^{c g}
- Dicellarius Chamberlin, 1920^{i c g b}
- Dixioria Chamberlin, 1947^{i c g}
- Dynoria Chamberlin, 1939^{i c g}
- Epeloria ^{c g}
- Erdelyia Hoffman, 1962^{i c g}
- Ezaria ^{c g}
- Ezodesmus ^{c g}
- Falloria Hoffman, 1948^{i c g}
- Fontaria ^{c g}
- Furcillaria Shelley, 1981^{i c g b}
- Gonoessa Shelley, 1984^{i c g}
- Grayaria ^{c g}
- Gyalostethus Hoffman, 1965^{i c g}
- Harpaphe Cook, 1904^{i c g b}
- Isaphe Cook, 1904^{i c g}
- Japonaria ^{c g}
- Kiulinga ^{c g}
- Koreoaria ^{c g}
- Levizonus ^{c g}
- Lourdesia Shelley, 1991^{i c g}
- Lyrranea Hoffman, 1963^{i c g}
- Macellolophus ^{c g}
- Melaphe ^{c g}
- Metaxycheir Buckett & Gardner, 1969^{i c g}
- Mimuloria ^{c g b}
- Montaphe Chamberlin, 1949^{i c g b}
- Motyxia Chamberlin, 1941^{i c g b}
- Nannaria Chamberlin, 1918^{i c g b}
- Nikkonus ^{c g}
- Ochridaphe ^{c g}
- Ochthocelata Shelley, 1995^{i c g}
- Oenomaea Hoffman, 1964^{i c g}
- Orophe Chamberlin, 1951^{i c g}
- Oxyurus ^{c g}
- Pachydesmus Cook, 1895^{i c g b}
- Paimokia ^{c g}
- Parafontaria ^{c g}
- Parariukiaria ^{g}
- Parcipromus Shelley, 1995^{i c g}
- Parvulodesmus Shelley, 1983^{i c g}
- Phrurodesmus ^{c g}
- Pleuroloma Rafinesque, 1820^{i c g b}
- Prionogonus Shelley, 1982^{i c g}
- Profontaria ^{c g}
- Rhysodesmus Cook, 1895^{i c g b}
- Rhysolus ^{c g}
- Riukiaria ^{c g}
- Rudiloria Causey, 1955^{i c g}
- Selenocheir Shelley, 1994^{i c g b}
- Semionellus Chamberlin, 1920^{i c g b}
- Sigmocheir Chamberlin, 1951^{i c g b}
- Sigmoria Chamberlin, 1939^{i c g b}
- Sinoria ^{c g}
- Stelgipus Loomis, 1944^{i c g}
- Stenodesmus DeSaussure, 1859^{i c g}
- Takakuwaia ^{c g}
- Thrinaphe ^{c g}
- Thrinaxoria Chamberlin & Hoffman, 1950^{i c g b}
- Tubaphe Causey, 1954^{i c g}
- Wamokia Chamberlin, 1941^{i c g b}
- Xystocheir Cook, 1904^{i c g b}
- Xystodesmus ^{c g}
- Yaetakaria ^{c g}
- Zinaria ^{c g}

Data sources: i = ITIS, c = Catalogue of Life, g = GBIF, b = Bugguide.net
