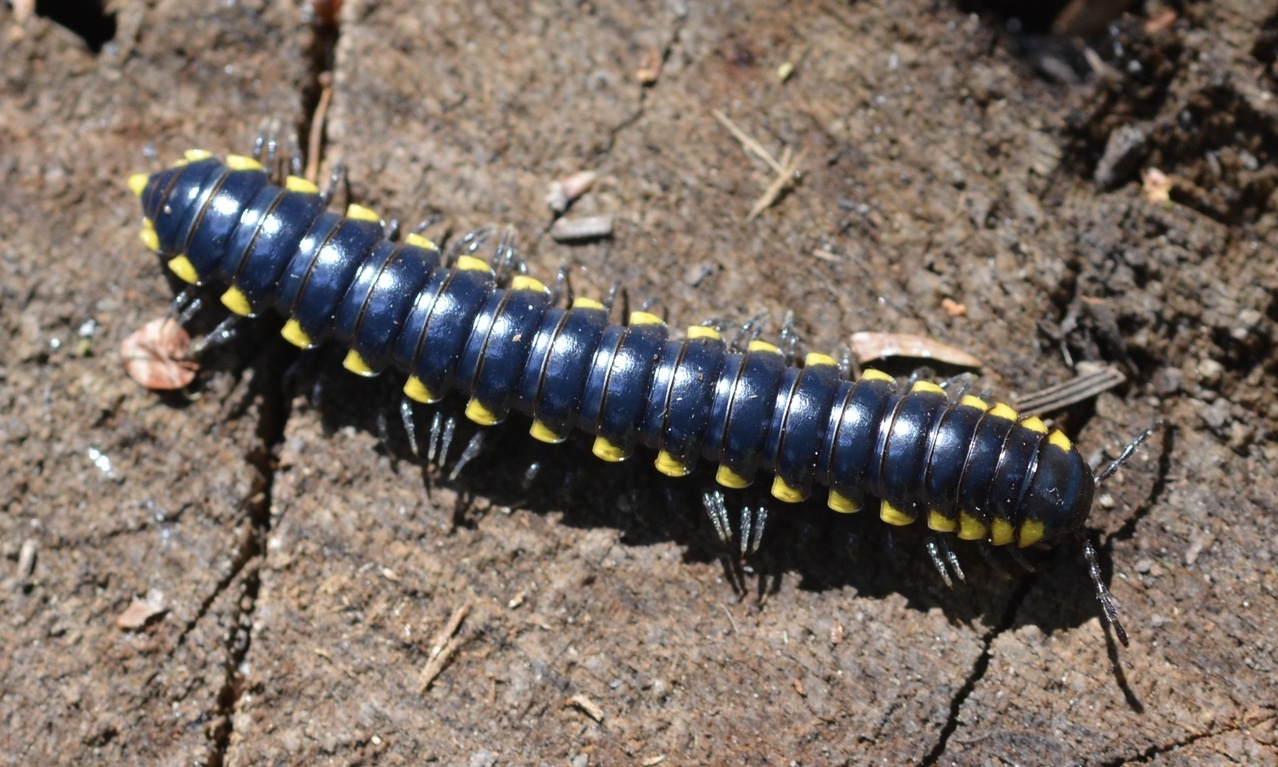
- In Portola Redwoods State Park

Scientific classification
- Kingdom: Animalia
- Phylum: Arthropoda
- Subphylum: Myriapoda
- Class: Diplopoda
- Order: Polydesmida
- Family: Xystodesmidae
- Genus: Harpaphe
- Species: H. haydeniana

Binomial name
- Harpaphe haydeniana (Wood, 1864)

Subspecies
- H. h. cummingsiensis (Verhoeff, 1944); H. h. haydeniana (Wood, 1864); H. h. inlignea Chamberlin, 1949; H. h. lanceolata Buckett & Gardner, 1968; H. h. maurogona Buckett & Gardner, 1968; H. h. scotia (Chamberlin, 1941)

Synonyms
- Subspecies synonymy: H. h. cummingsiensis; • Pachydesmus cummingsiensis Verhoeff, 1944; H. h. haydeniana; • Polydesmus haydenianus Wood, 1864; • Polydesmus intaminatus Karsch, 1881; • Fontaria simoni Brolemann, • Harpaphe haydeniana Cook, 1904; • Harpapahe intaminata Cook, 1904; • Isaphe simplex Chamberlin, 1918; H. h. inlignea; • Harpaphe inlignea Chamberlin, 1949; H. h. scotia; • Paimokia scotia Chamberlin, 1941; • Harpaphe clara Chamberlin, 1949

= Harpaphe haydeniana =

Species of millipede

Harpaphe haydeniana, commonly known as the yellow-spotted millipede, almond-scented millipede or cyanide millipede, is a species of polydesmidan ("flat-backed") millipede found in the moist forests along the Pacific coast of North America, from Southeast Alaska to California. The dark coloration with contrasting yellow-tipped keels warn of its ability to exude toxic hydrogen cyanide as a defense. The cyanide secretions are not dangerous to humans, but can cause irritation and pain if it contacts sensitive areas such as the mouth, eyes, or nose.

Despite the various common names given the species, the coloration pattern, cyanide defense, and associated almond scent occur in other flat-backed millipedes around the world.

== Description ==
Harpaphe haydeniana reach a length of 4–5 centimeters (1.6–2 in) when mature. The upper surface of the body is black to olive green, and is distinctively marked along the sides with patches of a yellowish colour. H. haydeniana has approximately twenty body segments, bearing a total of 30 (males) or 31 (females) pairs of legs. The difference between males and females is due to one pair of legs on the seventh segment in males being modified to form gonopods used for sperm transfer. Individuals may live for 2–3 years.

== Distribution ==
Harpaphe haydeniana occurs from southeast Alaska south to Monterey County, California, as far east as the Sierra Nevada mountains.

== Ecology ==
Harpaphe haydeniana is an important part of the forest ecosystem, breaking down leaf litter and freeing its nutrients for other organisms. It is commonly associated with redwood forests where many individuals may be found within a small area. Immature millipedes feed on humus.

Harpaphe haydeniana has few predators, due to its aposematic coloration and its ability to secrete hydrogen cyanide when threatened. This behaviour gives rise to the common names "cyanide millipede" and "almond-scented millipede" (since cyanide smells of almonds), although cyanide secretion is not unique to H. haydeniana. Nonetheless, at least one species, the ground beetle Promecognathus laevissimus, is a specialised predator of H. haydeniana.

== Similar species ==
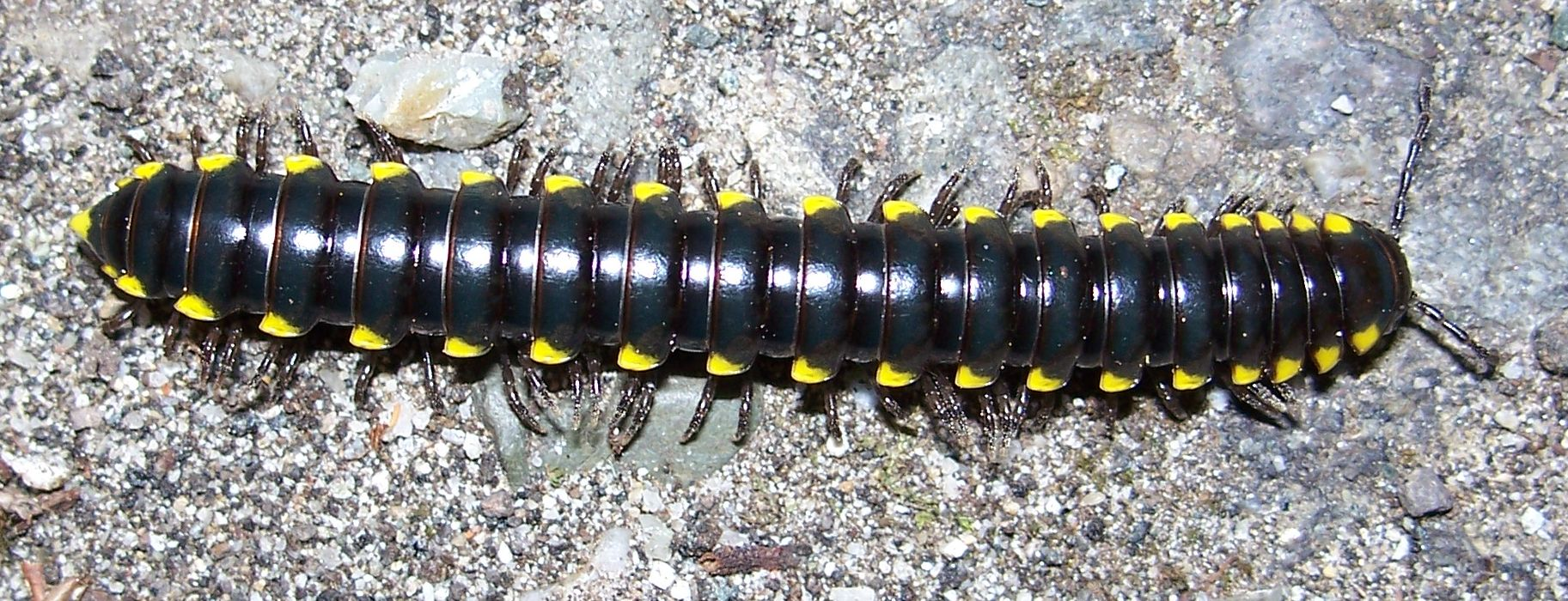
H. haydeniana has smooth, rounded segments.

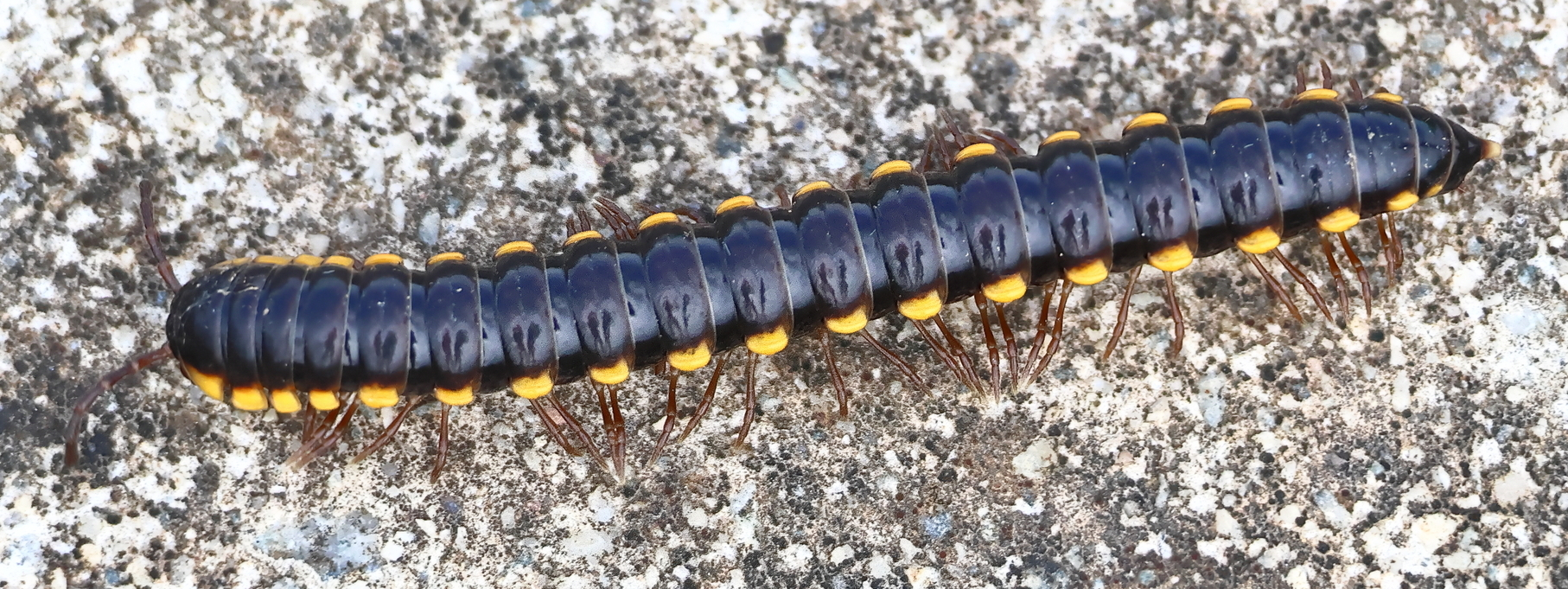
Anoplodesmus saussurii, an unrelated species, has a transverse groove in each segment.

Two other species of Harpaphe (H. pottera and H. telodonta) occur within the range of H. haydeniana, both with yellow-tipped paranota. H. telodonta (Humboldt and Del Norte counties, California) is slightly more brown in colour and has more strongly pointed keels while H. pottera (Mendocino and Humboldt counties) can only be distinguished by close examination of the male reproductive organs (gonopods).

The genus Harpaphe is in the family Xystodesmidae, which contains several other species with similar markings, including North American species of Boraria, Chonaphe, Paimokia, Hybaphe and Montaphe. Exact species determination requires examination of the male gonopods, but the sharply pointed posterior corners of the paranota can help distinguish Harpaphe from Hybaphe and Chonaphe.

Outside of North America, superficially similar species include Anoplodesmus saussurii which has been mistakenly called H. haydeniana, and Asiomorpha coarctata, the latter species being native to Southeast Asia but widely introduced around the world, including the American Gulf Coast region. The ability to secrete hydrogen cyanide is shared by other members of the Polydesmida, the largest order of millipedes.
