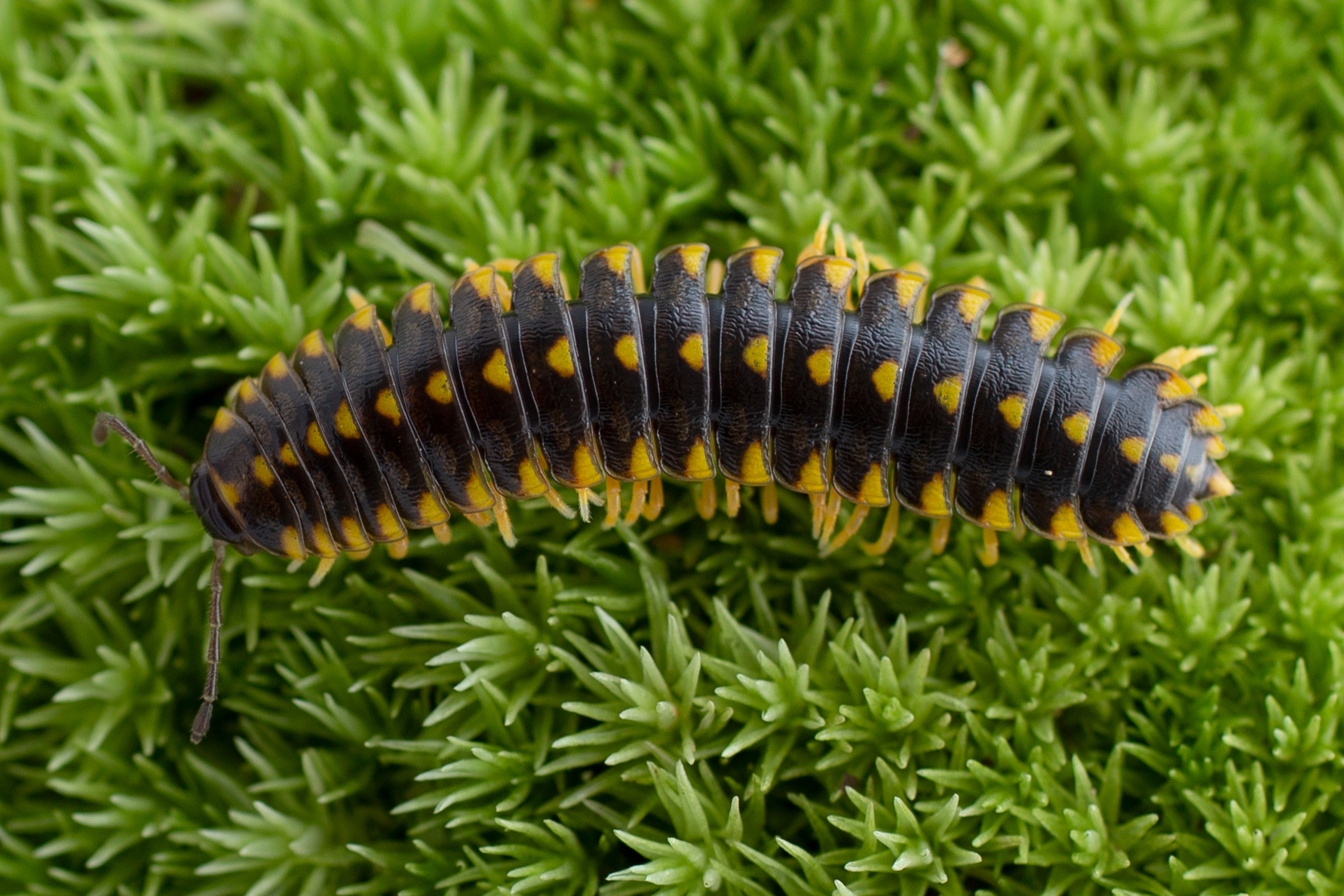
- Pleuroloma flavipes

Scientific classification
- Kingdom: Animalia
- Phylum: Arthropoda
- Subphylum: Myriapoda
- Class: Diplopoda
- Order: Polydesmida
- Family: Xystodesmidae
- Subfamily: Rhysodesminae
- Tribe: Rhysodesmini; Brölemann, 1916

= Rhysodesmini =

Tribe of millipedes

Rhysodesmini is a tribe of flat-backed millipedes in the family Xystodesmidae. There are about 16 genera and at least 126 described species in Rhysodesmini.

== Genera ==
- Aporiaria Chamberlin, 1938
- Boraria Chamberlin, 1943
- Caralinda Hoffman, 1978
- Cherokia Chamberlin, 1949
- Dicellarius Chamberlin, 1920
- Erdelyia Hoffman, 1962
- Gonoessa Shelley, 1984
- Gyalostethus Hoffman, 1965
- Howellaria Hoffman, 1950
- Idaloria Causey, 1955
- Lourdesia Shelley, 1991
- Pachydesmus Cook, 1895
- Parvulodesmus Shelley, 1983
- Pleuroloma Rafinesque, 1820
- Rhysodesmus Cook, 1895
- Stenodesmus DeSaussure, 1859
