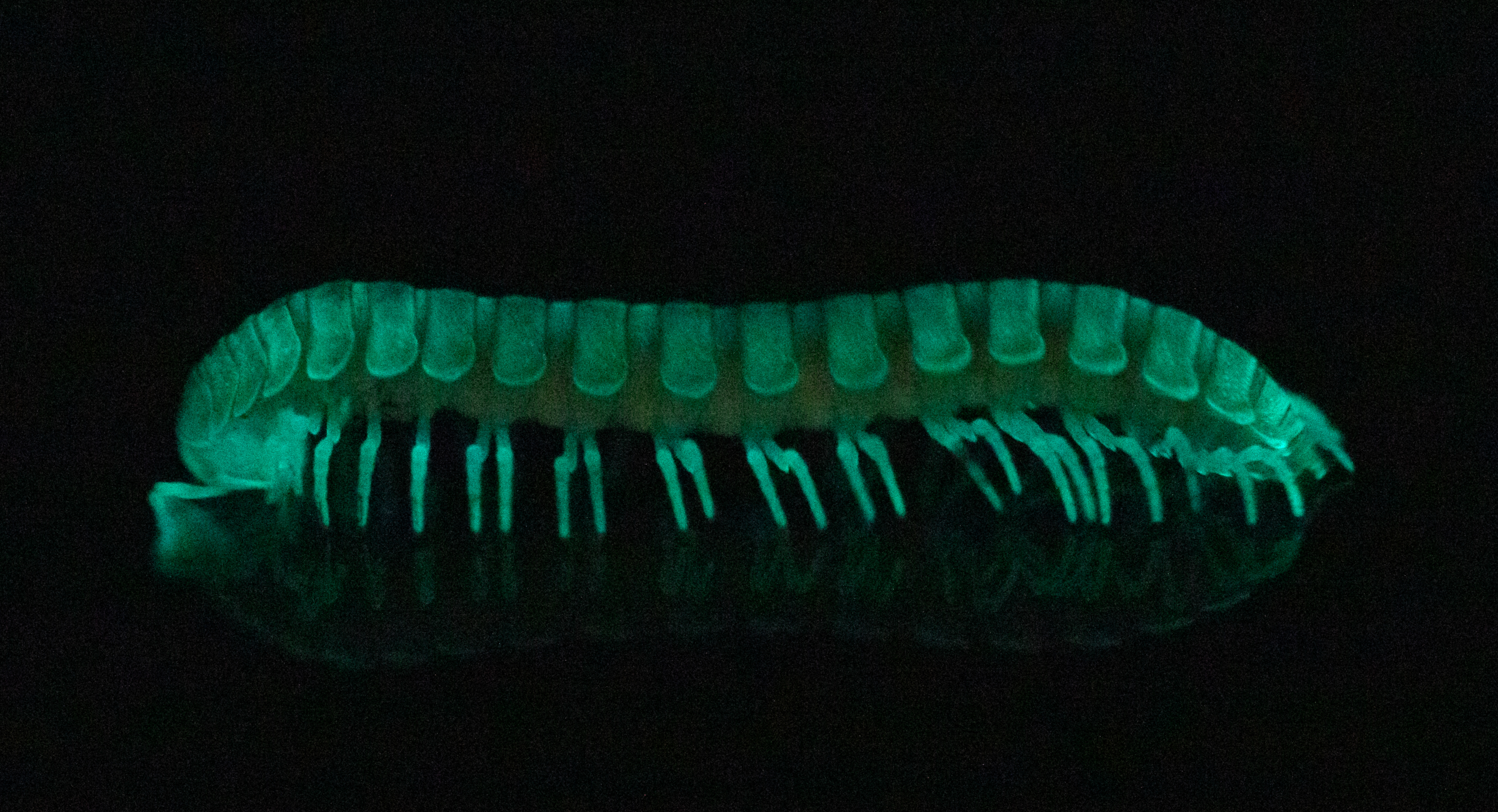
- Motyxia sequoiae (Loomis & Davenport, 1951) photographed in its own light.

Scientific classification
- Kingdom: Animalia
- Phylum: Arthropoda
- Subphylum: Myriapoda
- Class: Diplopoda
- Order: Polydesmida
- Family: Xystodesmidae
- Tribe: Xystocheirini
- Genus: Motyxia; Chamberlin, 1941

Type species
- Motyxia kerna Chamberlin, 1941

Species
- M. alia M. bistipita M. kerna M. monica M. ollae M. pior M. porrecta M. sequoia M. sequoiae M. tiemanni M. tularea

Synonyms
- Amplocheir Chamberlin, 1949; Luminodesmus Loomis & Davenport, 1951

= Motyxia =

Genus of millipedes

Motyxia is a genus of cyanide-producing millipedes (collectively known as Sierra luminous millipedes or motyxias) that are endemic to the southern Sierra Nevada, Tehachapi, and Santa Monica mountain ranges of California. Motyxias are blind and produce the poison cyanide, like all members of the Polydesmida. All species have the ability to glow brightly: some of the few known instances of bioluminescence in millipedes.

== Description ==
Adult Motyxia reach 3 to 4 cm in length, 4.5 to 8 mm wide, with 20 body segments, excluding the head. Females are slightly larger than males. Like other polydesmidans ("flat-backed" millipedes) they lack eyes and have prominent paranota (lateral keels). They are typically tan to orange-pink in color (except M. pior), with a dark mid-dorsal line. M. pior is the most variable in color, and ranges from dark gray to greenish-yellow to bright orange. They lack bumps on the metatergites (the dorsal plates possessing paranota), giving a somewhat smooth appearance. The anterior 2–3 diplosegments are oriented cephalically (towards the head), a trait most distinct in M. sequoiae, nearly indistinct in Motyxia porrecta. They are fluorescent under black light (millipedes in the tribe Xystocheirini display some of the brightest fluorescence of the U.S. Xystodesmidae species). Most uniquely they are bioluminescent: emitting light of their own production.

== Bioluminescence ==
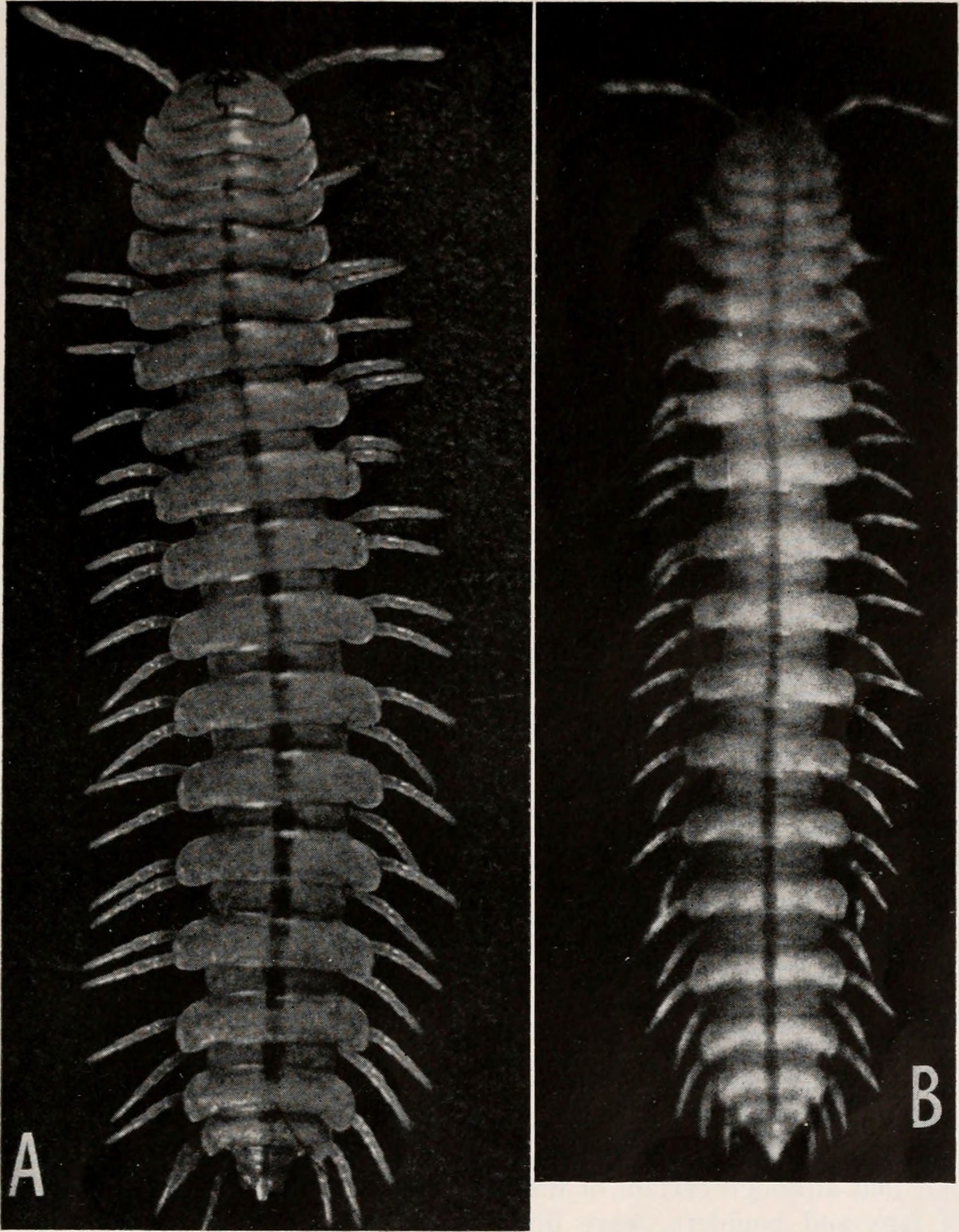
An adult M. sequoiae photographed in normal light (A) and its own light (B)

There are 11 species of Motyxia. They are some of the few known bioluminescent species of millipedes, a class of about 12,000 known species. Motyxia sequoiae glows the brightest and Motyxia pior the dimmest. Light is emitted from the exoskeleton of the millipede continuously, with peak wavelength of 495 nm (the light intensifies when the millipede is handled). Emission of light is uniform across the exoskeleton, and all the appendages (legs, antennae) and body rings emit light. The internal organs and viscera do not emit light. Luminescence is generated by a biochemical process in the millipede's exoskeleton. The light originates by way of a photoprotein, which differs from the photogenic molecule luciferase in firefly beetles.

Motyxia's photoprotein contains a porphyrin and is about 104 kDa in size. However, the structure of the luminescent photoprotein remains uncertain, and its homology to molecules of closely related arthropods is unknown.

Besides Motyxia, the only known bioluminecscent millipedes are Paraspirobolus lucifugus (Spirobolellidae), from Japan and Taiwan, and Salpidobolus (Rhinocricidae), both in the order Spirobolida. Another luminescent species of dubious existence from North America has been claimed, but it has not been found since the 1890s and the luminescence attributed to it is believed to have been larval phengodid beetles, also known as glowworms.

=== Theories for Bioluminescence Functionality ===
Scientists familiar with Motyxia were at odds over the function of bioluminescence in Motyxia and various studies and theories had been proposed.

One study found Motyxia that glowed brighter also tended to have larger cyanide glands and were thus more toxic to predators. While this implicates Motyxia's bioluminescence as an evolution for protection from predators, this study also notes that higher elevation millipedes glowed brighter. This finding led to the discovery that the more faint glow of the low-elevation millipedes was an older trait than the brighter glow of the high-elevation millipedes. Ultimately, the scientists of this study concluded that bioluminescence “may have initially evolved to cope with metabolic stress triggered by a hot, dry environment and was repurposed as a warning signal by species colonizing high-elevation habitats with greater predation risk.”

Another study provides further evidence for Motyxia's bioluminescence as a predator-deterrent. Researchers from the University of Arizona and other institutions collected 164 M. sequoiae from the Giant Sequoia National Monument and painted half to conceal their bioluminescence. Additionally, 300 clay millipedes were created, half with luminescent pigment. These specimens were placed randomly in a line overnight, with live ones tethered to the ground. In the morning, about one-third of the millipedes were attacked, primarily by southern grasshopper mice. Interestingly, luminescent millipedes experienced less than half the predation rate of their non-luminescent counterparts, hinting at a potential correlation between luminescence and reduced predation.

== Motyxia bistipita ==
The discovery of the Motyxia bistipita after nearly 50 years revealed new characteristics about the species and genus. In 1967, two small millipedes were discovered in San Luis Obispo, and were coined as a new species, Xystocheir bistipita. For almost 50 years, these two millipedes were the only sightings of the species, until they were rediscovered in 2013 in San Luis Obispo once again. The rediscovered specimens were brought to a lab and examined, where it was discovered that the species was bioluminescent. With this new piece of information, the Xystocheir bistipita was found to have a closer phylogenetic relationship with the Motyxia species and was renamed Motyxia bistipita.

M. bistipita lives in low elevations of the Sierra Nevada mountains in California, in a hotter, drier climate than other Motyxia. The glow is believed to be a response to heat; the bioluminescent proteins help neutralize the body's byproducts caused by heat. The bioluminescence later evolved as a warning signal to predators that the body contained cyanide.

== Ecology and behavior ==
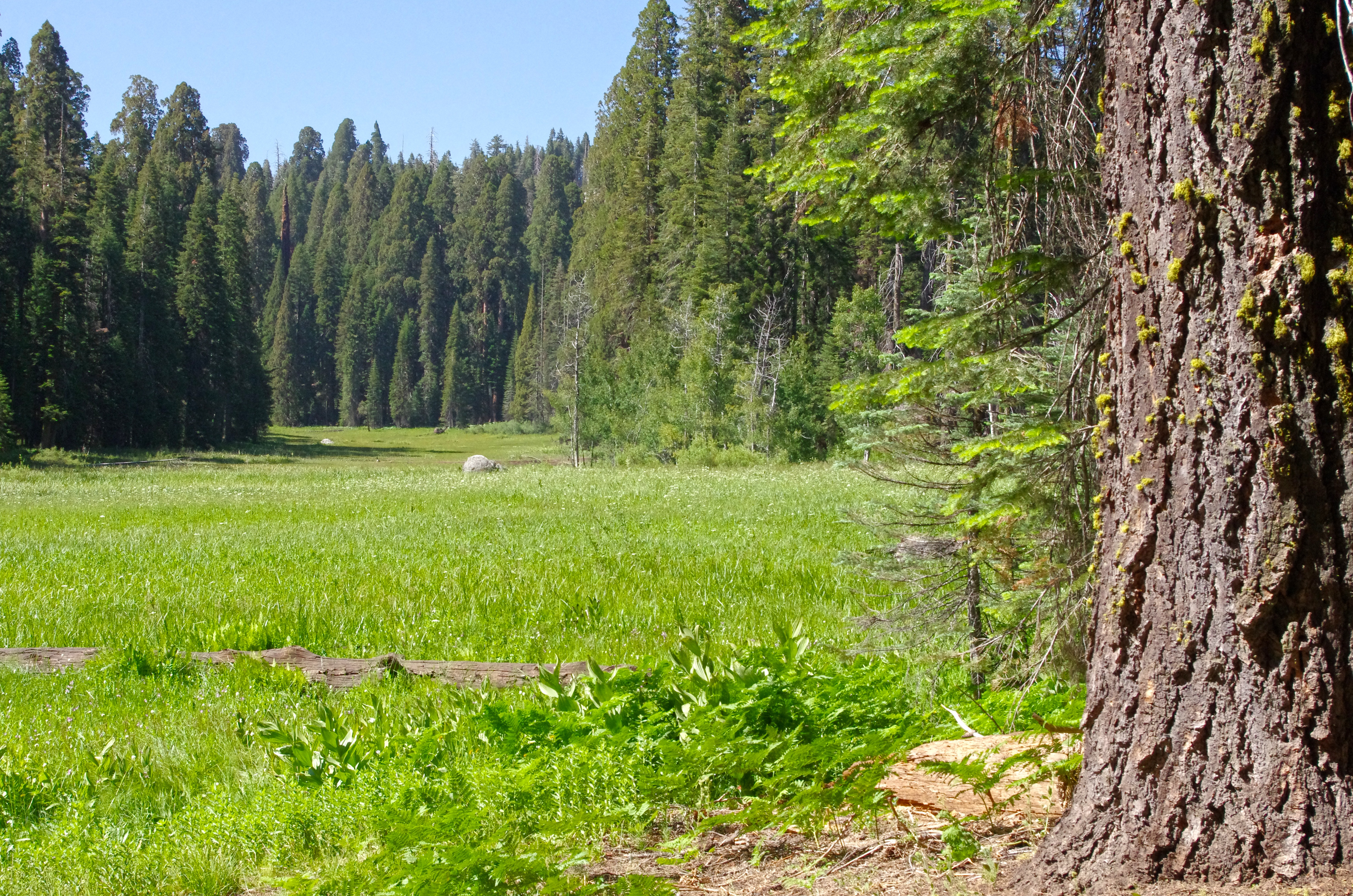
An open meadow surrounded by conifers in Sequoia National Park

Motyxias occur in live oak and giant sequoia forests, and notably also in meadows. The presence of xystodesmid millipedes in meadows is atypical for the family. Most species are observed under canopies of broad-leaf deciduous forests. All Motyxia species are exclusively nocturnal. During the day, individuals are burrowed beneath the soil. At night, they emerge (by an unknown mechanism not related to light since they're blind) and feed on decaying vegetation. Individuals of the species M. sequoiae have been observed climbing on tree trunks, possibly consuming algae and lichens adhering to the bark.

Natural predators of motyxias include rodents, geophilid centipedes, and larval phengodid beetles.

== Life cycle ==
The life cycle of M. sequoiae was studied in detail in the early 1950s. Eggs are round, about 0.7mm in diameter, and are laid in masses of 70–160 eggs. After about two weeks the larvae hatch with seven body segments and three pairs of legs, and measure about 1.7mm long. Juveniles exhibit bioluminescence as early as hatching. Additional legs and body segments develop with each molt, during which the animals construct a protective spherical cocoon or molt chamber out of soil. Larvae go through seven developmental stages (instars) before reaching adulthood. In males, the single pair of reproductive structures (gonopods) begin to develop in the 4th instar, before which male and females have equal numbers of walking legs, and after which males have one fewer pair.

== Distribution ==
Distribution of Motyxia species, after Shelley, 1997

Motyxia species occur in an approximate 280 km (175 mi) vertical range across three counties in California: Los Angeles, Kern and Tulare counties. Species predominately occur in the Santa Monica, Tehachapi, and southern Sierra Nevada Mountains. The northernmost species is M. pior, which occurs as far north as Crystal Cave in Sequoia National Park. The southernmost species is M. monica, which has a disjunct distribution: a population in southern Kern County, and an isolated one in the Santa Monica Mountains near the city of Los Angeles. The range of the eight species largely do not overlap, although M. tularea overlaps with M. kerna and M. sequoiae.

== Species ==
List of Species

Species	Taxon author	Geographic range	Notes
M. alia	Causey & Tiemann, 1969	"Central Tulare Co., valleys of South Fork of Kaweah River, North Fork of Tule River, and Yokohl River."	Originally described as Motyxia sequoia alia.
M. bistipita	(Shelley, 1996)	Low elevations of the Sierra Nevada mountains in California	Originally described as Xystocheir bistipita
M. kerna	Chamberlin, 1941	Southern Tulare Co. to northern Kern Co.,
M. monica	Chamberlin, 1944	Kern Co., south of the Kern River, and a disjunct population in the Santa Monica Mountains.
M. ollae	Causey & Tiemann, 1969	"Southern Tulare County, valleys of Deer Creek, Pothole Creek, and Tule River."	Originally described as Motyxia sequoia ollae.
M. pior	Chamberlin 1941	Tulare Co., Sequoia National Park
M. porrecta	Causey & Tiemann, 1969	Kern River Valley
M. sequoia (Note: The near identical spelling of M. sequoia and M. sequoiae are due to both species originally being named under different genera. Under the International Code of Zoological Nomenclature the names cannot be replaced.)	(Chamberlin, 1941)	East Fork of the Kaweah River, Tulare Co.	Originally described as Xystocheir sequoia.
M. sequoiae	(Loomis & Davenport, 1951)	Headwaters of the Tule River (Middle fork), Tulare Co.	Originally described as Luminodesmus sequoiae.
M. tiemanni	Causey, 1960	Northern Kern Co.
M. tularea	(Chamberlin, 1949)	Central Tulare Co. to extreme northern Kern Co.	Originally described as Xystocheir tularea. Two subspecies: M. t. tularea. and M. t. ollae.

== Classification and evolution ==
The speciation of Motyxia is believed to have been driven by geological events and a drying climate following the most recent Pleistocene glaciation, while reproductive isolating mechanisms include rivers which are at their fullest levels in times when adults are most active, and marked differences in rainfall and suitable habitat across mountainous terrain.

Motyxia is a member of the family Xystodesmidae, a group of large and colorful millipedes, and M. monica is the southernmost species of Xystodesmidae in western North America. Within Xystodesmidae, Motyxia is placed in the tribe Xystocheirini along with the genera Anombrocheir, Parcipromus, Wamokia, and Xystocheir, all of which are native to California.

== Future Studies ==
According to Paul E. Marek, one of the most heavily involved researchers of these millipedes, "much about Motyxia remains mysterious." There is still a lot to learn about Motyxia's mating habits, their emergences into the night, and the exact evolutionary reasons for their bioluminescence.
