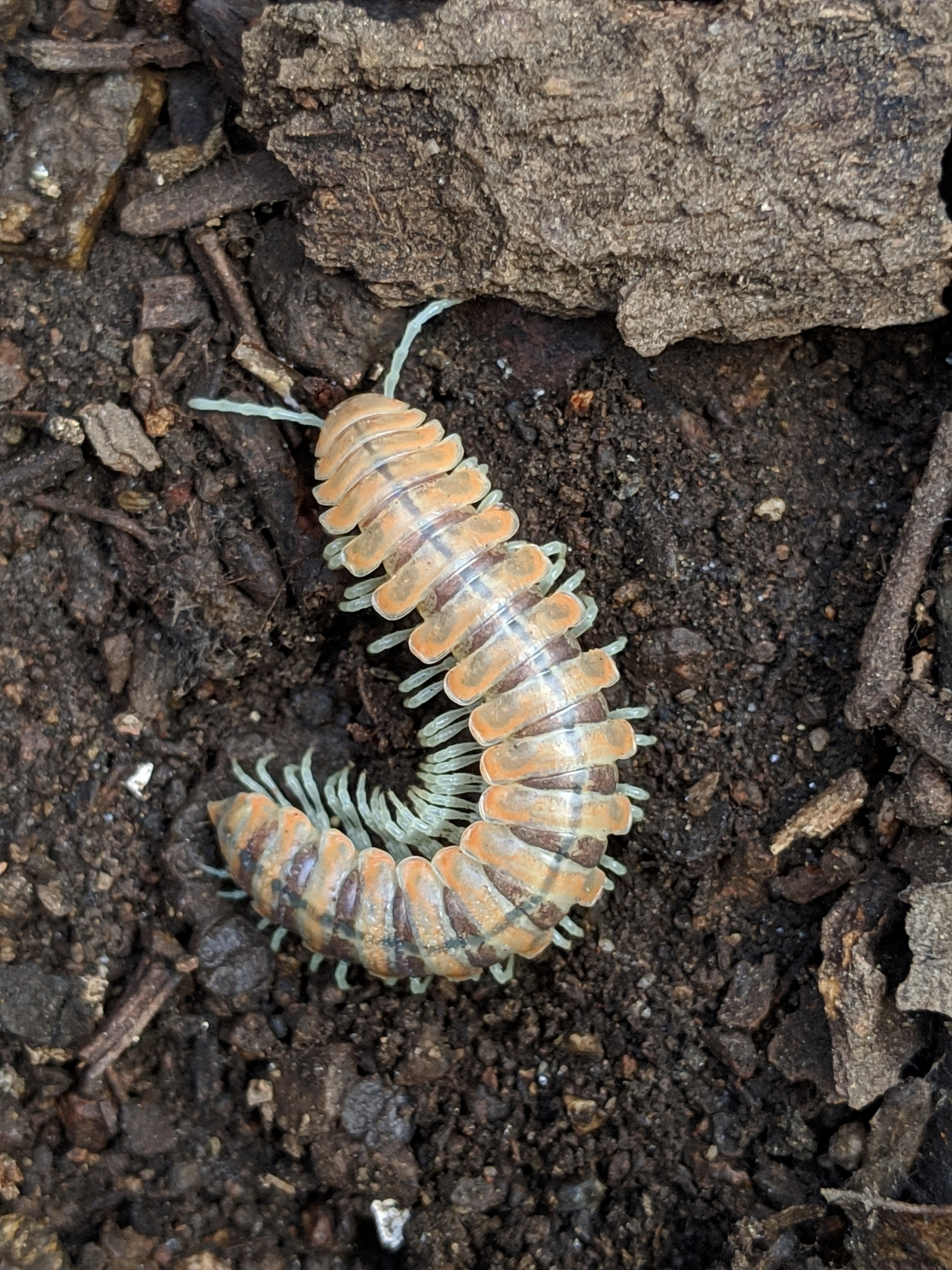
- Motyxia monica

Scientific classification
- Kingdom: Animalia
- Phylum: Arthropoda
- Subphylum: Myriapoda
- Class: Diplopoda
- Order: Polydesmida
- Family: Xystodesmidae
- Tribe: Xystocheirini; Cook, 1904

= Xystocheirini =

Tribe of millipedes

Xystocheirini is a tribe of flat-backed millipedes in the family Xystodesmidae. There are about 5 genera and more than 40 described species in Xystocheirini.

== Genera ==
These five genera belong to the tribe Xystocheirini:

- Anombrocheir Buckett & Gardner, 1969
- Motyxia Chamberlin, 1941
- Parcipromus Shelley, 1995
- Wamokia Chamberlin, 1941
- Xystocheir Cook, 1904
