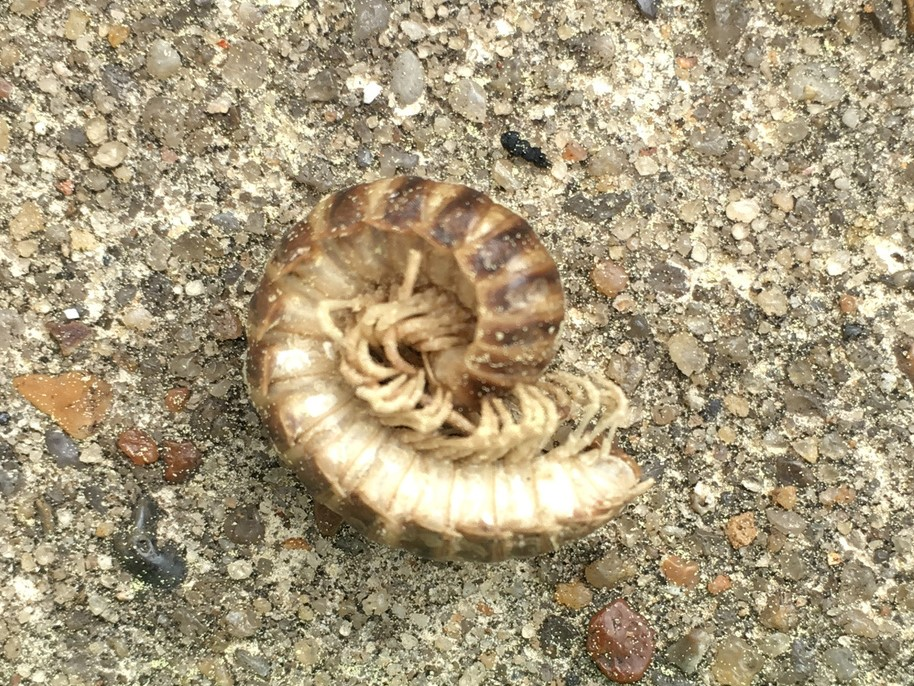

Scientific classification
- Kingdom: Animalia
- Phylum: Arthropoda
- Subphylum: Myriapoda
- Class: Diplopoda
- Order: Polydesmida
- Family: Xystodesmidae
- Genus: Dicellarius
- Species: D. lamprus

Binomial name
- Dicellarius lamprus (Chamberlin, 1918)

= Dicellarius lamprus =

Species of millipede

Dicellarius lamprus is a species of flat-backed millipede in the family Xystodesmidae. It is found in North America.
