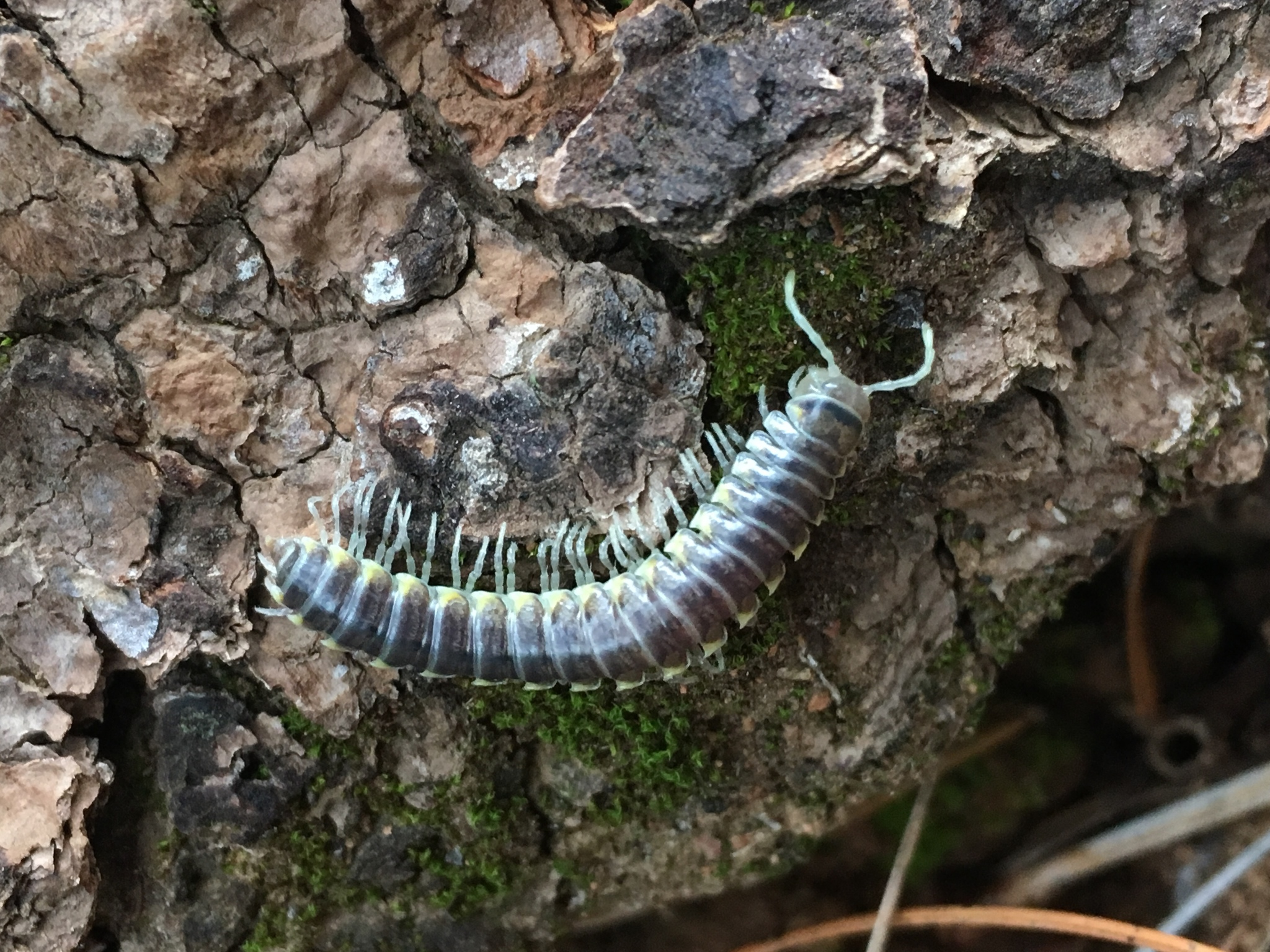

Scientific classification
- Kingdom: Animalia
- Phylum: Arthropoda
- Subphylum: Myriapoda
- Class: Diplopoda
- Order: Polydesmida
- Family: Xystodesmidae
- Genus: Xystocheir
- Species: X. brachymacris

Binomial name
- Xystocheir brachymacris Shelley, 1996

= Xystocheir brachymacris =

Species of millipede

Xystocheir brachymacris is a species of flat-backed millipede in the family Xystodesmidae. It is found in North America.
