= Boraria stricta =

Scientific classification
- Kingdom: Animalia
- Phylum: Arthropoda
- Subphylum: Myriapoda
- Class: Diplopoda
- Order: Polydesmida
- Family: Xystodesmidae
- Genus: Boraria
- Species: B. stricta

Binomial name
- Boraria stricta (Brölemann, 1896)

Species of millipede

Boraria stricta is a species of flat-backed millipede in the family Xystodesmidae. It is found in North America.
