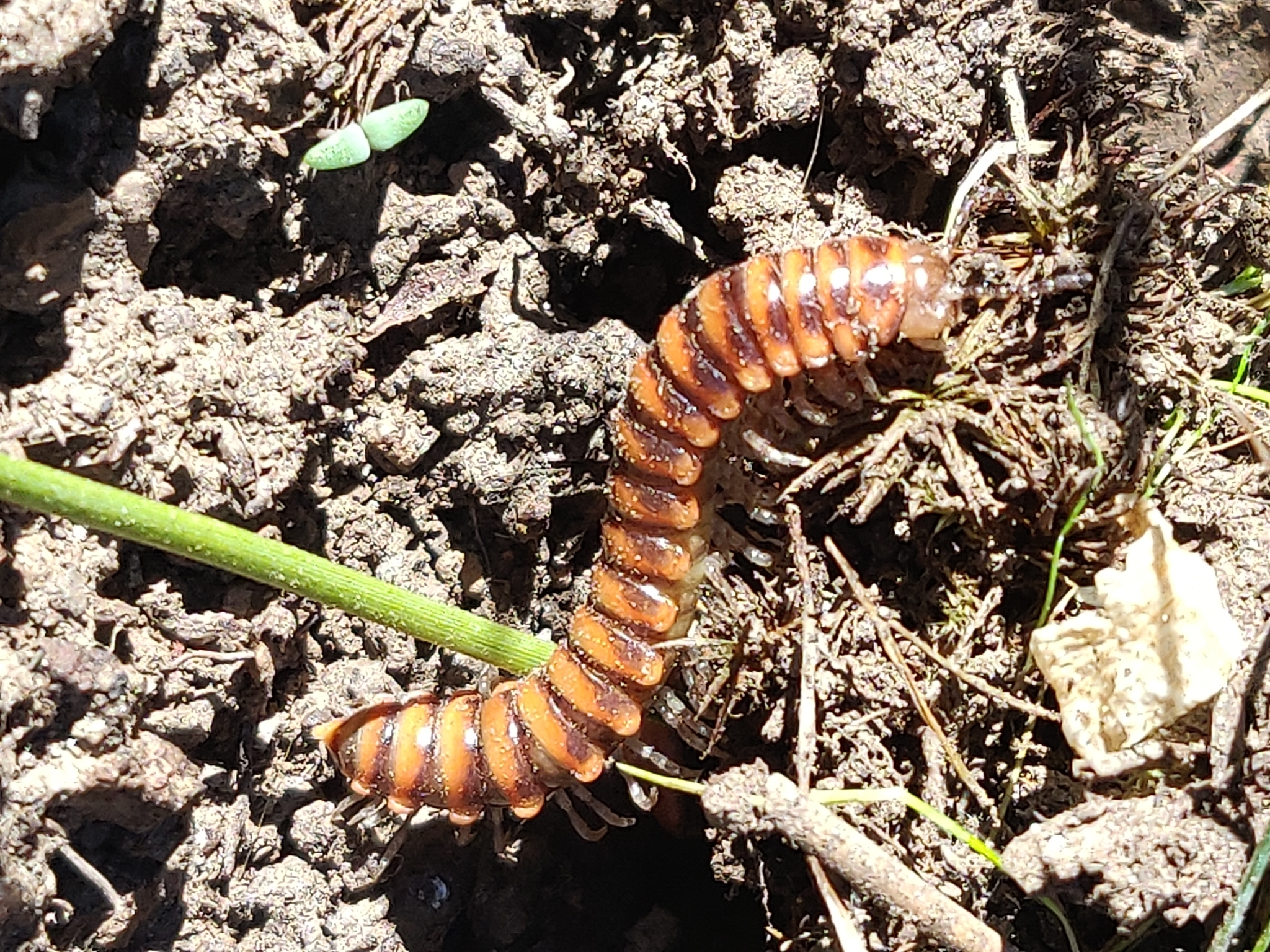
- Montaphe elrodi, Post Falls, Kootenai County, Idaho

Scientific classification
- Kingdom: Animalia
- Phylum: Arthropoda
- Subphylum: Myriapoda
- Class: Diplopoda
- Order: Polydesmida
- Family: Xystodesmidae
- Genus: Montaphe
- Species: M. elrodi

Binomial name
- Montaphe elrodi (Chamberlin, 1913)

= Montaphe elrodi =

Species of millipede

Montaphe elrodi is a species of flat-backed millipede in the family Xystodesmidae. It is found in North America.
