= Oxyurus =

Oxyurus may refer to:

- Oxyurus (millipede), a genus of millipedes in the family Xystodesmidae
- Oxyurus, a genus of wasps in the family Scelionidae, synonym of Sparasion
- Oxyurus, a genus of birds in the family Furnariidae, synonym of Aphrastura
