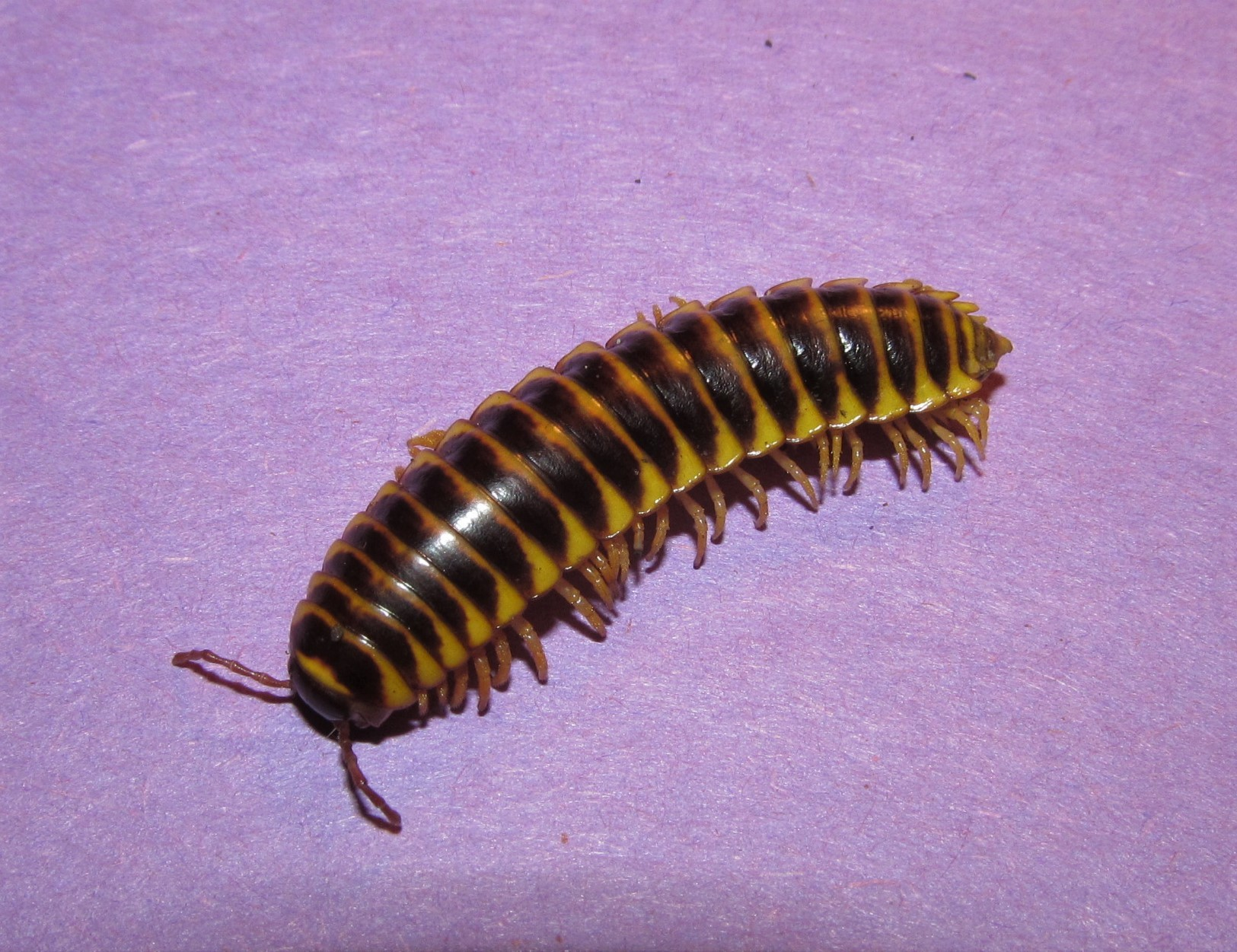
- Appalachioria calcaria

Scientific classification
- Kingdom: Animalia
- Phylum: Arthropoda
- Subphylum: Myriapoda
- Class: Diplopoda
- Order: Polydesmida
- Family: Xystodesmidae
- Subfamily: Rhysodesminae
- Tribe: Apheloriini; Hoffman, 1980

Type genus
- Apheloria Chamberlin, 1921

= Apheloriini =

Tribe of millipedes

Apheloriini is a tribe of flat-backed millipedes in the subfamily Rhysodesminae in the family Xystodesmidae. These millipedes are endemic to the temperate forests of North America. All species in this tribe produce cyanide, which they emit through their ozopores as a defense against predators. Millipedes in this tribe are also known as cherry millipedes, because the production of cyanide also generates benzaldehyde, which smells like cherries or almonds.

These millipedes display bright colors in aposematic patterns to warn predators of toxic secretions. Millipedes in this tribe in the Appalachian Mountains, including species of Apheloria and Brachoria, participate in Müllerian mimicry rings. As a result of this mimicry among species, color patterns are extremely variable within species.

== Phylogeny ==
A phylogenetic analysis of the family Xystodesmidae using molecular data finds the tribe Apheloriini is monophyletic and places this tribe in a clade with species in the tribe Rhysodesmini, which emerge as the closest relatives of the tribe Apheloriini. Within the tribe Apheloriini, this analysis places the genus Brachoria in a clade with the genus Daphnedesmus. These two close relatives form a sister group for another clade containing species of Apheloria, Rudiloria, and Appalachioria. These five genera together form a sister group for the genus Sigmoria, which occupies a more basal branch of a phylogenetic tree of this tribe. These six genera form a sister group for the other genus in this tribe, Deltotaria, which occupies the most basal branch of a phylogenetic tree of this tribe.

== Description ==
These species are large as well as colorful, usually ranging from 4 cm to 6 cm in length, and feature broad bodies. These millipedes exhibit sexual dimorphism in size, with females generally larger than males. Millipedes in this tribe display color patterns that include yellow, orange, red, pink, or violet.

Species in this tribe can be distinguished from its close relatives in the same subfamily based on features of the gonopods in adult males. For example, the distal part of the gonopod (telopodite) in this tribe is curved and twisted, unlike the linear telopodites found in the tribe Rhysodesmini. Furthermore, the proximal part of the telopodite features either only a short projection (prefemoral process) or none at all in the tribe Apheloriini but features a long prefemoral process shaped like a needle in the tribe Rhysodesmini. Moreover, the sternum between the base of the gonopods (coxae) is absent in the tribe Apheloriini, whereas a remnant of this sternum is usually present in the tribe Rhysodesmini.

== Distribution ==
Millipedes in this tribe are found mainly in the United States east of the Great Plains and north of the Gulf Coast states. The distribution of this tribe, however, extends as far north as southern Quebec in Canada. This distribution extends as far east as western New England and the Atlantic coast further south. These populations are concentrated, however, in the Appalachian Highlands, with the greatest species diversity found in the southern Appalachian Mountains.

== Ecology ==
Millipedes in this tribe are usually found under leaf litter on the floor of moist deciduous hardwood forests. Many are also found among Rhododendron, especially in the southern Blue Ridge Mountains. A few species are also found in cedar glades. These millipedes feed on moist dead leaves from maple, tulip poplar, oak, and dogwood trees. These millipedes are mainly diurnal, but a few species can be observed in large numbers after dark.

== Genera ==
The tribe Apheloriini includes the following seven genera:

- Apheloria Chamberlin, 1921
- Appalachioria Marek & Bond, 2006
- Brachoria Chamberlin, 1939
- Daphnedesmus Marek, Means & Hennen, 2021
- Deltotaria Causey, 1942
- Rudiloria Causey, 1955
- Sigmoria Chamberlin, 1939
