= Chonaphini =

Scientific classification
- Kingdom: Animalia
- Phylum: Arthropoda
- Subphylum: Myriapoda
- Class: Diplopoda
- Order: Polydesmida
- Family: Xystodesmidae
- Tribe: Chonaphini; Verhoeff, 1941

Tribe of millipedes

Chonaphini is a tribe of flat-backed millipedes in the family Xystodesmidae. There are about 6 genera and 19 described species in Chonaphini.

== Genera ==
These six genera belong to the tribe Chonaphini:

- Chonaphe Cook, 1904
- Metaxycheir Buckett & Gardner, 1969
- Montaphe Chamberlin, 1949
- Selenocheir Shelley, 1994
- Semionellus Chamberlin, 1920
- Tubaphe Causey, 1954
