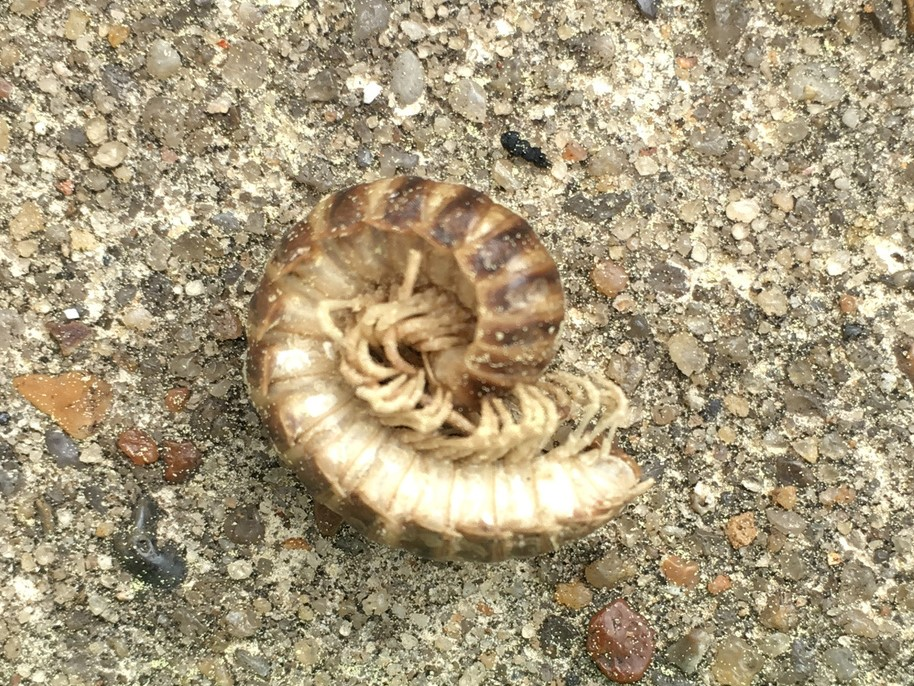
- Dicellarius lamprus

Scientific classification
- Kingdom: Animalia
- Phylum: Arthropoda
- Subphylum: Myriapoda
- Class: Diplopoda
- Order: Polydesmida
- Family: Xystodesmidae
- Subfamily: Rhysodesminae
- Tribe: Rhysodesmini
- Genus: Dicellarius; Chamberlin, 1920

Synonyms
- Thrinaxoria Chamberlin & Hoffman, 1950

= Dicellarius =

Genus of millipedes

Dicellarius is a genus of flat-backed millipedes in the family Xystodesmidae. There are at least 11 described species in Dicellarius.

== Species ==
These 11 species belong to the genus Dicellarius:

- Dicellarius atlanta (Chamberlin, 1946)
- Dicellarius bimaculatus (McNeill, 1887)
- Dicellarius bifidus Wood, 1864
- Dicellarius fictus (Chamberlin, 1943)
- Dicellarius lamellidens (Chamberlin, 1931)
- Dicellarius lamprus (Chamberlin, 1918)
- Dicellarius okefenokensis (Chamberlin, 1918)
- Dicellarius paynei (Shelley, 2002)
- Dicellarius sternolobus Loomis, 1969
- Dicellarius talapoosa (Chamberlin, 1939)
- Dicellarius separandus (Shelley, 1984)
