= Sinoria =

Scientific classification
- Kingdom: Animalia
- Phylum: Arthropoda
- Subphylum: Myriapoda
- Class: Diplopoda
- Order: Polydesmida
- Family: Xystodesmidae
- Genus: Sinoria; Tanabe, Ishii & Yin, 1996

Genus of millipedes

Sinoria is a genus of millipedes belonging to the family Xystodesmidae.

The species of this genus are found in China.

Species:

- Sinoria tianmu Tanabe, Ishii & Yin, 1996
