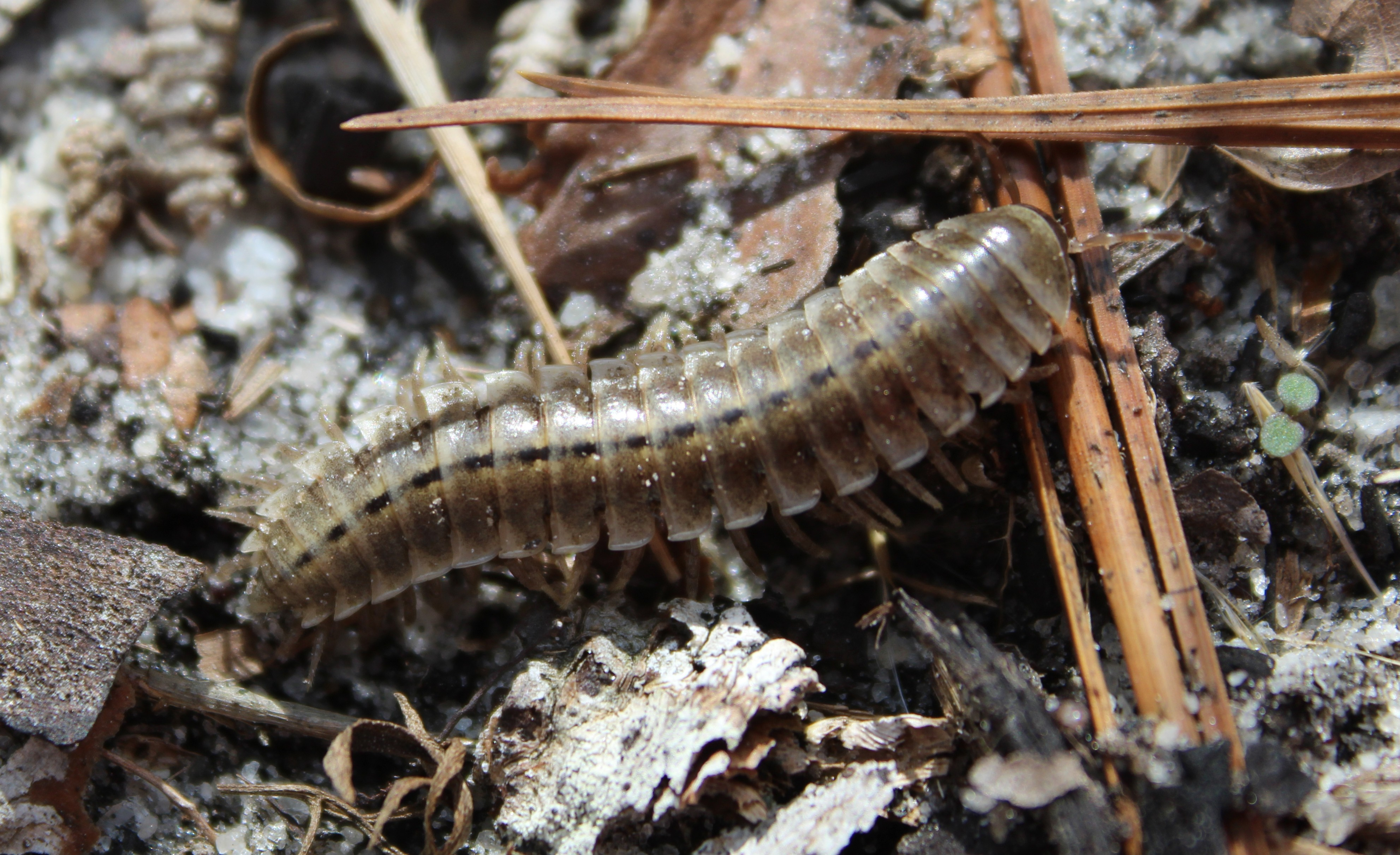

Scientific classification
- Kingdom: Animalia
- Phylum: Arthropoda
- Subphylum: Myriapoda
- Class: Diplopoda
- Order: Polydesmida
- Family: Xystodesmidae
- Subfamily: Rhysodesminae
- Tribe: Rhysodesmini
- Genus: Caralinda; Hoffman, 1978

= Caralinda =

Genus of millipedes

Caralinda is a North American genus of millipedes belonging to the family Xystodesmidae. Its range extends from the coastal plain of southern South Carolina southwest to the Florida panhandle, with known occurrences in South Carolina, Georgia, Florida, and Alabama. It is primarily winter-active.

Caralinda is small-bodied, ranging between 16–24 mm long. Its color is generally beige, with a distinct dark middorsal line and two longitudinal dark speckled bands near the bases of the paranota. This coloration may be characteristic of the genus.

At least one species of Caralinda has been documented to display aggregation behavior similar to Pleuroloma flavipes.

Species:

- Caralinda beatrix Hoffman, 1978
- Caralinda causeyi Shelley, 1983
- Caralinda dactylifera Shelley, 1983
- Caralinda fabalecta Shelley, 2000
- Caralinda pulchritecta Shelley, 1979
