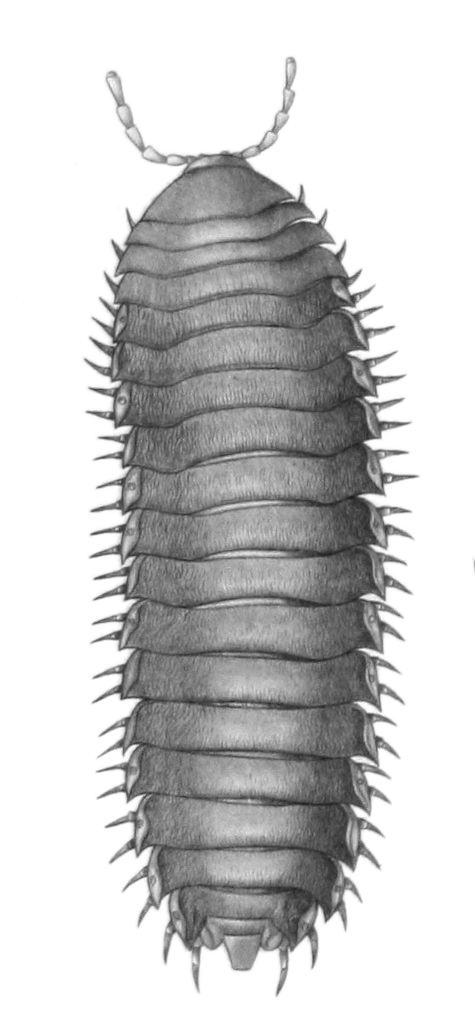
- Rhysodesmus dasypus

Scientific classification
- Domain: Eukaryota
- Kingdom: Animalia
- Phylum: Arthropoda
- Subphylum: Myriapoda
- Class: Diplopoda
- Order: Polydesmida
- Family: Xystodesmidae
- Tribe: Rhysodesmini
- Genus: Rhysodesmus; Cook, 1895

Diversity
- at least 100 species

= Rhysodesmus =

Genus of millipedes

Rhysodesmus is a genus of flat-backed millipedes in the family Xystodesmidae. There are at least 90 described species in Rhysodesmus., ranging from El Salvador to the Southern United States.

== Species ==
These 92 species belong to the genus Rhysodesmus:

- Rhysodesmus acolhuus (Humbert & DeSaussure, 1869)^{i c g}
- Rhysodesmus agrestis Shelley, 1999^{g}
- Rhysodesmus alpuyecus Chamberlin, 1943^{i c g}
- Rhysodesmus angelus (Karsch, 1881)^{i c g}
- Rhysodesmus angustus Loomis, 1966^{i c g}
- Rhysodesmus arcuatus Pocock, 1910^{i c g}
- Rhysodesmus attemsi Pocock, 1909^{i c g}
- Rhysodesmus bolivari Chamberlin, 1943^{i c g}
- Rhysodesmus bonus Chamberlin, 1943^{c g}
- Rhysodesmus byersi Loomis, 1966^{i c g}
- Rhysodesmus championi Pocock, 1909^{i c g}
- Rhysodesmus chelifer Takakuwa, 1941^{c g}
- Rhysodesmus chisosi Shelley, 1989^{i c g}
- Rhysodesmus cohaesivus Wang, 1957^{c g}
- Rhysodesmus consobrinus (DeSaussure, 1859)^{i c g}
- Rhysodesmus constrictus Loomis, 1966^{i c g}
- Rhysodesmus contiguus Wang, 1957^{c g}
- Rhysodesmus coriaceus Loomis, 1968^{i c g}
- Rhysodesmus cuernavacae Chamberlin, 1942^{i c g}
- Rhysodesmus cumbres Chamberlin, 1943^{i c g}
- Rhysodesmus dampfi (Verhoeff, 1932)^{i c g}
- Rhysodesmus dasypus (Gervais, 1847)^{i c g}
- Rhysodesmus depressus Loomis, 1966^{i c g}
- Rhysodesmus diacanthus Miyosi, 1952^{c g}
- Rhysodesmus elestribus Chamberlin, 1943^{i c g}
- Rhysodesmus esperanzae Chamberlin, 1943^{i c g}
- Rhysodesmus eunis Chamberlin, 1943^{i c g}
- Rhysodesmus eusculptus Chamberlin, 1941^{i c g}
- Rhysodesmus flavocinctus Pocock, 1909^{i c g}
- Rhysodesmus fraternus (DeSaussure, 1859)^{i c g}
- Rhysodesmus frionus Chamberlin, 1943^{i c g}
- Rhysodesmus garcianus Chamberlin, 1943^{i c g}
- Rhysodesmus geniculatus Takakuwa, 1941^{c g}
- Rhysodesmus godmani Pocock, 1909^{i c g}
- Rhysodesmus guardanus Chamberlin, 1943^{i c g}
- Rhysodesmus hamatilis Loomis, 1966^{i c g}
- Rhysodesmus ikaoensis Takakuwa, 1942^{c g}
- Rhysodesmus intermedius Chamberlin, 1943^{i c g}
- Rhysodesmus inustus Pocock, 1910^{i c g}
- Rhysodesmus jugosus Loomis, 1966^{i c g}
- Rhysodesmus kitazawai Miyosi, 1953^{c g}
- Rhysodesmus knighti Chamberlin, 1941^{i c g}
- Rhysodesmus latus Loomis, 1968^{i c g}
- Rhysodesmus leonensis Chamberlin, 1941^{i c g}
- Rhysodesmus malinche Chamberlin, 1943^{i c g}
- Rhysodesmus marcosus Chamberlin, 1952^{i c g}
- Rhysodesmus mayanus Chamberlin, 1925^{i c g}
- Rhysodesmus minor (Chamberlin, 1943)^{i c g}
- Rhysodesmus montezumae (DeSaussure, 1859)^{i c g}
- Rhysodesmus morelus Chamberlin, 1943^{i c g}
- Rhysodesmus murallensis Loomis, 1966^{i c g}
- Rhysodesmus mystecus (Humbert & DeSaussure, 1869)^{i c g}
- Rhysodesmus nahuus (Humbert & DeSaussure, 1869)^{i c g}
- Rhysodesmus notostictus Pocock, 1910^{i c g}
- Rhysodesmus obliquus Loomis, 1966^{i c g}
- Rhysodesmus ochraceus Gressitt, 1941^{c g}
- Rhysodesmus otomitus (DeSaussure, 1859)^{i c g}
- Rhysodesmus perotenus Chamberlin, 1943^{i c g}
- Rhysodesmus potosianus Chamberlin, 1942^{i c g}
- Rhysodesmus punctatus Loomis, 1966^{i c g}
- Rhysodesmus pusilllus Pocock, 1910^{c}
- Rhysodesmus pusillus Pocock, 1909^{i c g}
- Rhysodesmus restans Hoffman, 1998^{i c g}
- Rhysodesmus rubrimarginis Chamberlin, 1943^{i c g}
- Rhysodesmus salvini Pocock, 1910^{c g}
- Rhysodesmus sandersi Causey, 1954^{i c g}
- Rhysodesmus scutata Takakuwa, 1942^{c g}
- Rhysodesmus semicircularis Takakuwa, 1941^{g}
- Rhysodesmus semicirculatus Takakuwa, 1941^{c g}
- Rhysodesmus semiovatus Loomis, 1966^{i c g}
- Rhysodesmus seriatus Chamberlin, 1947^{i c g}
- Rhysodesmus serrulatus Miyosi, 1952^{c g}
- Rhysodesmus shirozui Takakuwa, 1942^{c g}
- Rhysodesmus simplex Loomis, 1966^{i c g}
- Rhysodesmus smithi Pocock, 1910^{i c g}
- Rhysodesmus spinosissimus Miyosi, 1952^{c g}
- Rhysodesmus spiralipes Takakuwa, 1942^{c g}
- Rhysodesmus stolli Pocock, 1909^{i c g}
- Rhysodesmus tabascensis Pocock, 1909^{i c g}
- Rhysodesmus tacubayae Chamberlin, 1943^{i c g}
- Rhysodesmus taiwanus Takakuwa, 1942^{c g}
- Rhysodesmus tepanecus (DeSaussure, 1859)^{i c g}
- Rhysodesmus tepoztlanus Chamberlin, 1943^{i c g}
- Rhysodesmus texicolens (Chamberlin, 1938)^{i c g b}
- Rhysodesmus toltecus (DeSaussure, 1859)^{i c g}
- Rhysodesmus totonacus (DeSaussure, 1859)^{i c g}
- Rhysodesmus tuberculatus Takakuwa, 1942^{c g}
- Rhysodesmus variatus Pocock, 1895^{c g}
- Rhysodesmus vicinus (DeSaussure, 1859)^{i c g}
- Rhysodesmus violaceus (Brolemann, 1900)^{i c g}
- Rhysodesmus zapotecus (DeSaussure, 1860)^{i c g}
- Rhysodesmus zendalus (Humbert & DeSaussure, 1869)^{i c g}

Data sources: i = ITIS, c = Catalogue of Life, g = GBIF, b = Bugguide.net
