= Rhysodesminae =

Scientific classification
- Kingdom: Animalia
- Phylum: Arthropoda
- Subphylum: Myriapoda
- Class: Diplopoda
- Order: Polydesmida
- Family: Xystodesmidae
- Subfamily: Rhysodesminae; Brolemann, 1916

Subfamily of millipedes

Rhysodesminae is a subfamily of millipedes belonging to the family Xystodesmidae within the order Polydesmida.

== Description ==
Members of this group are characterized by their cylindrical bodies and colorful patterns, which are often aposematic, serving as a warning to potential predators. Millipedes in this subfamily are primarily distributed in North America, though their specific range and ecological niches vary.

The group is notable for its intricate gonopods, the male reproductive structures, which are used as key diagnostic features in identifying species. Rhysodesminae millipedes are detritivores, feeding on decaying organic material and contributing to nutrient cycling within their ecosystems.

== Taxonomy ==
Rhysodesminae contains the following tribes:

- Apheloriini Hoffman, 1980
- Eurymerodesmini Causey, 1951
- Euryurini Pocock, 1909
- Nannarini Hoffman, 1964
- Rhysodesmini Brölemann, 1916
