= Parafontaria =

Scientific classification
- Kingdom: Animalia
- Phylum: Arthropoda
- Subphylum: Myriapoda
- Class: Diplopoda
- Order: Polydesmida
- Family: Xystodesmidae
- Subfamily: Xystodesminae
- Tribe: Parafontariini; Hoffman, 1978
- Genus: Parafontaria; Verhoeff, 1936

Species
- See text

Synonyms
- Japonaria Attems, 1938; Grayaria Chamberlin, 1943

Genus of millipedes

Parafontaria is a genus of "flat-backed" millipedes (order Polydesmida) consisting of 14 species native to Japan and Korea. Parafontaria laminata armigera, formerly called train millipedes, has been synonymized with P. laminata. This is because some populations exhibit periodical swarming behavior during which large numbers congregate and can impact train passage when this congregation occurs on tracks. Documentation of this event goes back to 1920. Individuals vary from around 3.5 to 6 cm (1.4 to 2.4 in) as adults, and feed on leaf litter as well as soil, making them comparable to earthworms in facilitating decomposition and soil nutrient cycling.

== Species ==
- Parafontaria crenata Shinohara, 1986
- Parafontaria doenitzi (Karsch, 1880)
- Parafontaria erythrosoma (Takakuwa, 1942)
- Parafontaria falcifera (Verhoeff, 1936)
- Parafontaria ishiii Shinohara, 1986
- Parafontaria koreana (Paik, 1963)
- Parafontaria laminata (Attems, 1909) This species is poisonous.
- Parafontaria longa Shinohara, 1986
- Parafontaria shiraiwaensis Shinohara, 1986
- Parafontaria spathulata (Miyosi, 1951)
- Parafontaria takakuwai (Shinohara in Takashima & Shinohara, 1957)
- Parafontaria terminalis (Takakuwa, 1942)
- Parafontaria tokaiensis Tanabe, 2002
- Parafontaria tonominea (Attems, 1899)
