= Oxyurus (millipede) =

Scientific classification
- Domain: Eukaryota
- Kingdom: Animalia
- Phylum: Arthropoda
- Subphylum: Myriapoda
- Class: Diplopoda
- Order: Polydesmida
- Family: Xystodesmidae
- Genus: Oxyurus; Koch, 1847

Genus of millipedes

Oxyurus is a genus of millipedes belonging to the family Xystodesmidae.

The species of this genus are found in Southern America.

Species:

- Oxyurus cinerascens Koch, 1847
- Oxyurus flavolimbatus Koch, 1877
- Oxyurus glabratus Koch
- Oxyurus pallidus Koch, 1847
- Oxyurus roseus Koch, 1847
- Oxyurus vestita Koch, 1847
- Oxyurus vestitus Koch, 1847
