= Macellolophus =

Scientific classification
- Kingdom: Animalia
- Phylum: Arthropoda
- Subphylum: Myriapoda
- Class: Diplopoda
- Order: Polydesmida
- Family: Chelodesmidae
- Genus: Macellolophus; Attems, 1940

Genus of millipedes

Macellolophus is a genus of millipedes belonging to the family Chelodesmidae.

The species of this genus are found in Spain, Gibraltar, and North Africa.

== Species ==
There are two species:

- Macellolophus diadema (Gervais, 1836) – status uncertain
- Macellolophus rubromarginatus (Lucas, 1846)
