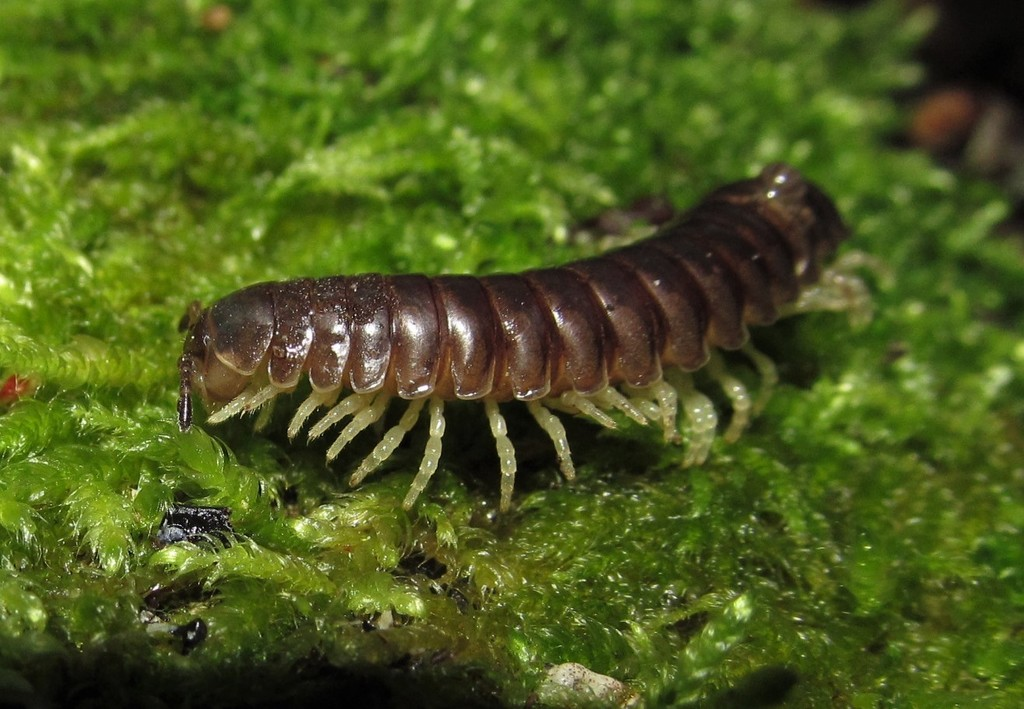

Scientific classification
- Domain: Eukaryota
- Kingdom: Animalia
- Phylum: Arthropoda
- Subphylum: Myriapoda
- Class: Diplopoda
- Order: Polydesmida
- Family: Xystodesmidae
- Tribe: Xystodesmini
- Genus: Thrinaphe; Shelley, 1993

Type species
- Thrinaphe hargeri Shelley, 1993

= Thrinaphe =

Genus of millipede

Thrinaphe is a genus of millipede in the family Xystodesmidae with a single described species. The genus was erected by Rowland M. Shelley in 1993 based on samples collected by Dr. Shelley in 1991 as well as museum type specimens collected by K. Goeden in 1968. The genus is found in the Cascade mountains on the Washington/Oregon border as well as down into the Willamette Valley.

== Description ==
Thrinaphe is a robust Xystodesmid with an overall brown ground color and slight blueish tinge to the tergites. The paranota arise very low on the tergites and are also strongly depressed, giving the millipede a cylindrical appearance from above.

Based on iNaturalist observations Thrinaphe hargeri appears to lack any aposematic coloration of the paranota and has a generally uniform color.

== Etymology ==
The name Trinaphe is a reference to the three-branched telopodite of the gonopod and the similarity to Harpaphe

== Taxonomy ==
Thrinaphe contains the following species:

- Thrinaphe hargeri
