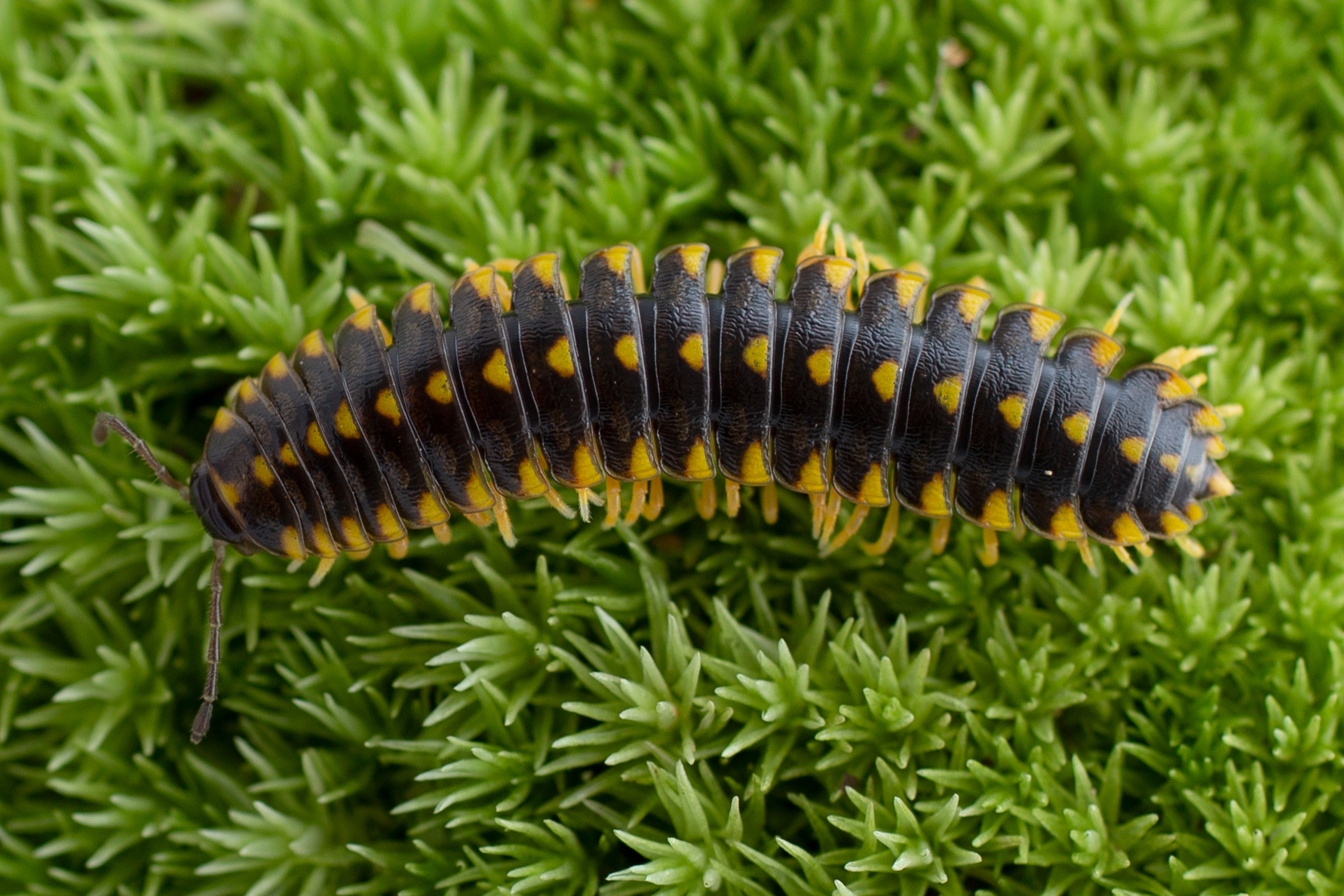
- The wrinkled flat-backed millipede Cherokia georgiana (Bollman, 1889)

Scientific classification
- Kingdom: Animalia
- Phylum: Arthropoda
- Subphylum: Myriapoda
- Class: Diplopoda
- Order: Polydesmida
- Family: Xystodesmidae
- Tribe: Rhysodesmini
- Genus: Cherokia; Chamberlin, 1949

= Cherokia =

Genus of millipedes

Cherokia Chamberlin, 1949 is a genus consisting of a single species, Cherokia georgiana (Bollman, 1889). Commonly known as the wrinkled flat-backed millipede, this species belongs to the order Polydesmida and the family Xystodesmidae. It inhabits forests in the southeastern United States, particularly those with hemlock, maple, tulip poplar, rhododendron, cedar, and spruce-fir trees.

A 2022 study conducted a molecular phylogenetic analysis and confirmed that Cherokia includes only one species, C. georgiana. This study found no evidence supporting the previously proposed subspecies based on morphological data. Instead, it revealed that C. georgiana exhibits significant morphological variation, specifically in characters such as the shape of the paranota and body size. These variables correlate with geographical distribution and elevation but not with phylogeny. The coloration of C. georgiana is highly diverse and does not align with either geography or phylogeny.

Cherokia is closely related to the genus Pleuroloma and belongs to the tribe Rhysodesmini.

It stands apart from other genera of Xystodesmidae due to distinct characteristics, including a wrinkly texture on its dorsal surface, horizontally wide paranota with minimal downward curvature, a straight telopodite on its gonopod (as opposed to the curved or twisted form found in the Apheloriini), a long icepick-like prefemoral process on the telopodite, and the absence of a receptacle in females' cyphopods. The coloration of C. georgiana ranges from yellow to red and exhibits patterns such as two-spotted, three-spotted, and striped, with the three-spotted yellow pattern being the most common.
