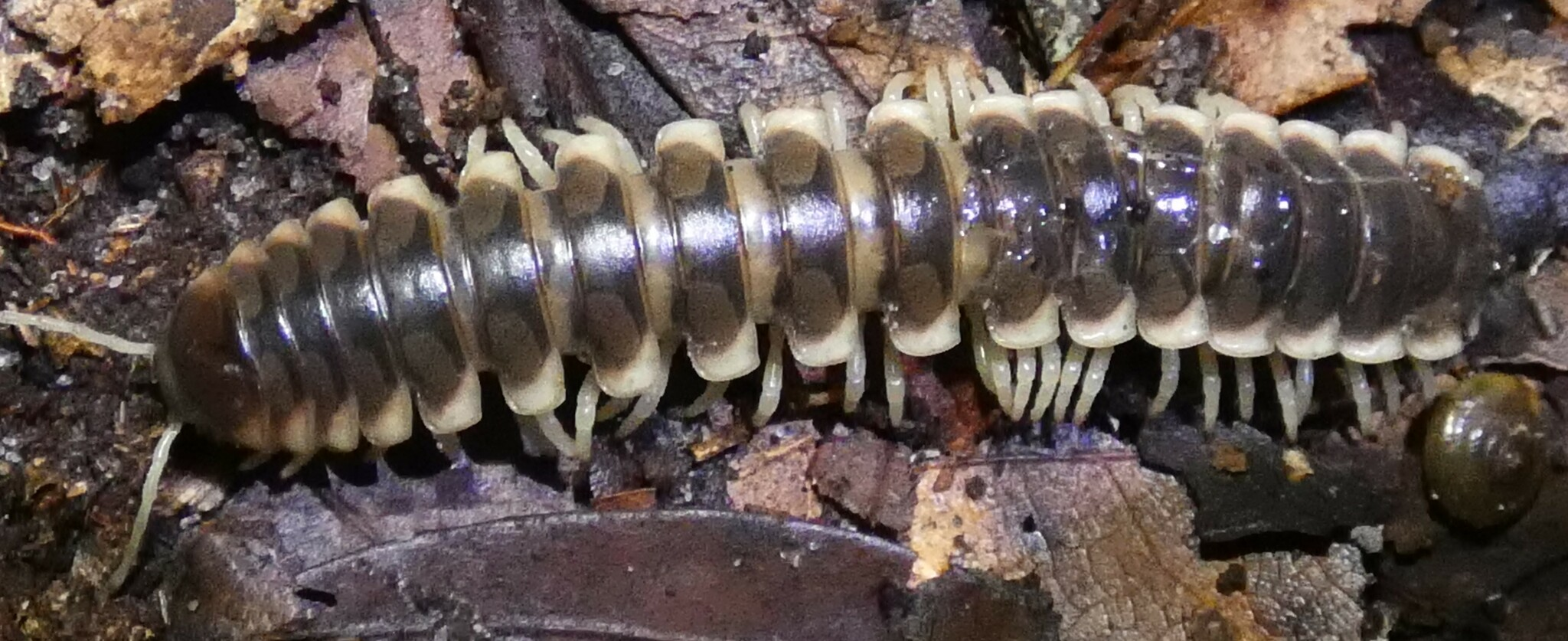
- Pachydesmus incursus

Scientific classification
- Kingdom: Animalia
- Phylum: Arthropoda
- Subphylum: Myriapoda
- Class: Diplopoda
- Order: Polydesmida
- Family: Xystodesmidae
- Tribe: Rhysodesmini
- Genus: Pachydesmus; Cook, 1895

= Pachydesmus =

Genus of millipedes

Pachydesmus is a genus of flat-backed millipedes in the family Xystodesmidae. There are about 9 described species in Pachydesmus.

== Species ==
These 9 species belong to the genus Pachydesmus:

- Pachydesmus adsinicolus Hoffman, 1958
- Pachydesmus clarus Chamberlin, 1918
- Pachydesmus crassicutis Wood, 1864
- Pachydesmus denticulatus Chamberlin, 1946
- Pachydesmus duplex Chamberlin, 1939
- Pachydesmus hubrichti Hoffman, 1958
- Pachydesmus incursus Chamberlin, 1939
- Pachydesmus laticollis Attems, 1899
- Pachydesmus retrorsus Chamberlin, 1921
