= Paimokia =

Scientific classification
- Kingdom: Animalia
- Phylum: Arthropoda
- Subphylum: Myriapoda
- Class: Diplopoda
- Order: Polydesmida
- Family: Xystodesmidae
- Genus: Paimokia; Chamberlin, 1941

Genus of millipedes

Paimokia is a genus of millipedes belonging to the family Xystodesmidae.

The species of this genus are found in Western North America.

Species:

- Paimokia haydeniana
- Paimokia modestior Chamberlin, 1941
- Paimokia telodonta Chamberlin, 1943
