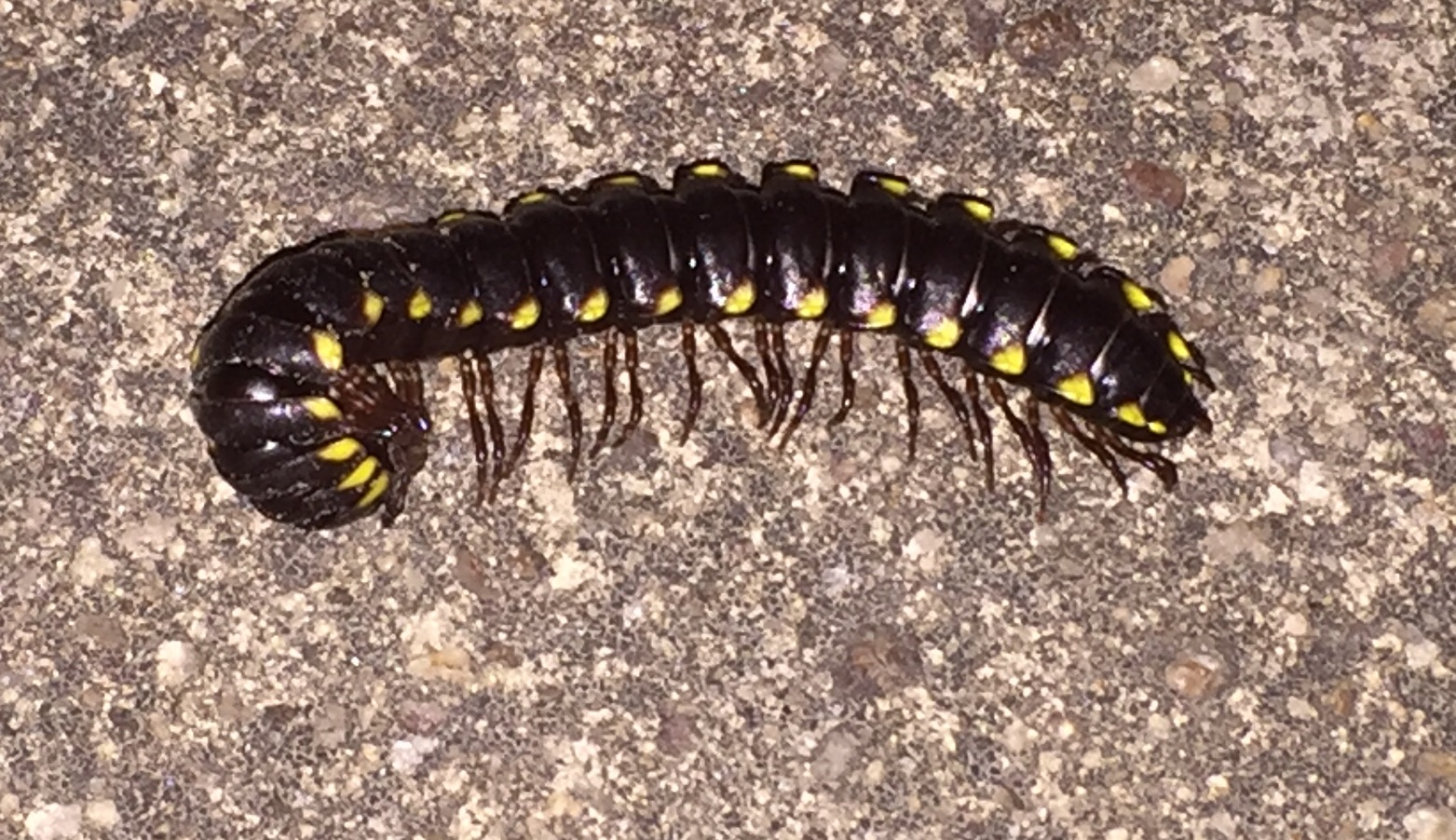
- Boraria stricta

Scientific classification
- Kingdom: Animalia
- Phylum: Arthropoda
- Subphylum: Myriapoda
- Class: Diplopoda
- Order: Polydesmida
- Family: Xystodesmidae
- Tribe: Rhysodesmini
- Genus: Boraria; Chamberlin, 1943

= Boraria =

Genus of millipedes

Boraria is a genus of flat-backed millipedes in the family Xystodesmidae. There is one described species in Boraria.

== Species ==
There is one species belonging to the genus Boraria:

- Boraria stricta (Brölemann, 1896)
