= Stenodesmus (millipede) =

Scientific classification
- Domain: Eukaryota
- Kingdom: Animalia
- Phylum: Arthropoda
- Subphylum: Myriapoda
- Class: Diplopoda
- Order: Polydesmida
- Family: Xystodesmidae
- Genus: Stenodesmus; Saussure, 1859

Genus of millipedes

Stenodesmus is a genus of millipedes belonging to the family Xystodesmidae.

The species of this genus are found in Northern America.

Species:

- Stenodesmus acuarius (Attems, 1931)
- Stenodesmus mexicanus De Saussure, 1859
- Stenodesmus serratus (Loomis, 1959)
- Stenodesmus simillimus (Humbert & De Saussure, 1869)
- Stenodesmus tuobitus (Chamberlin, 1910)
