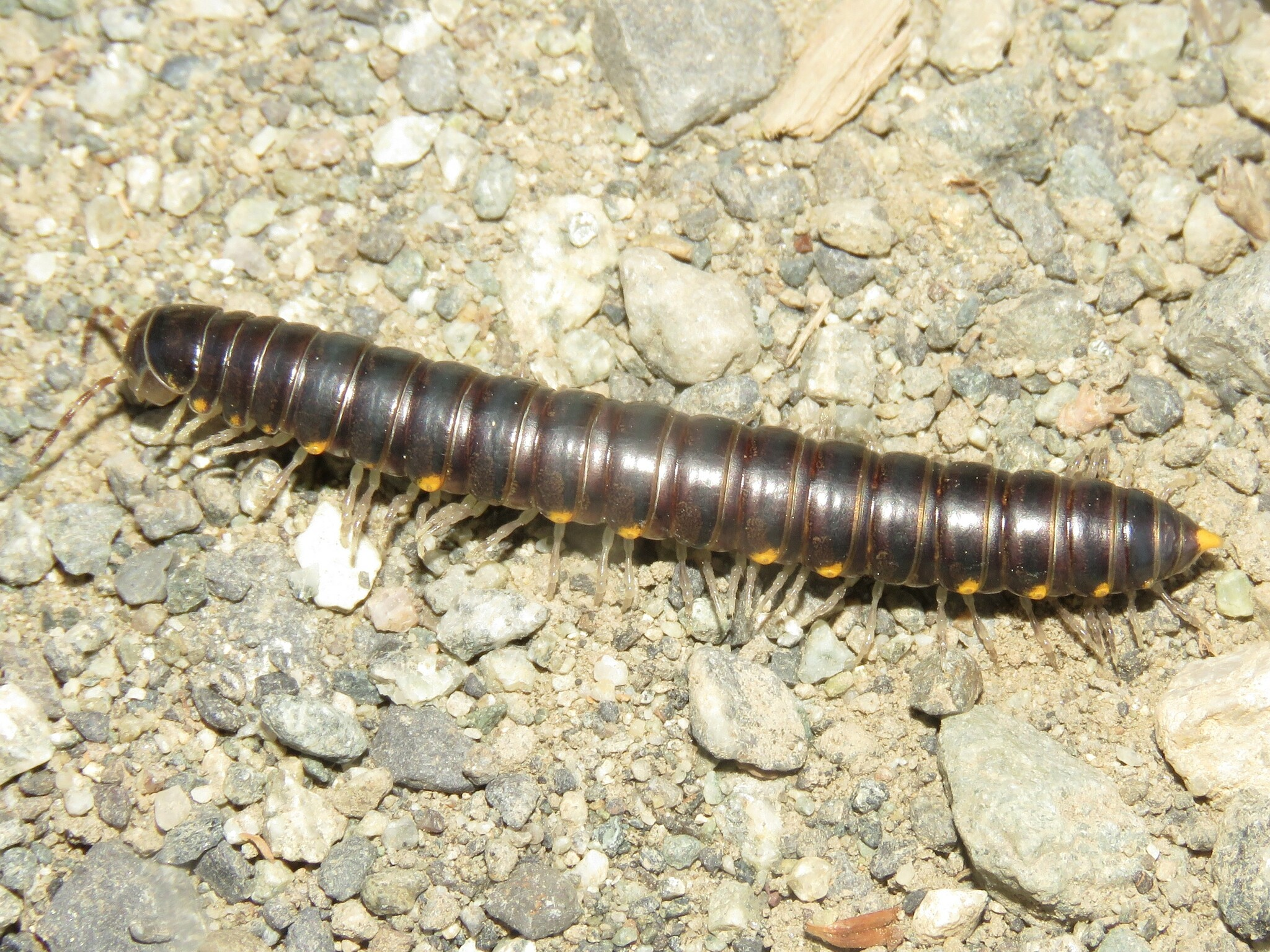

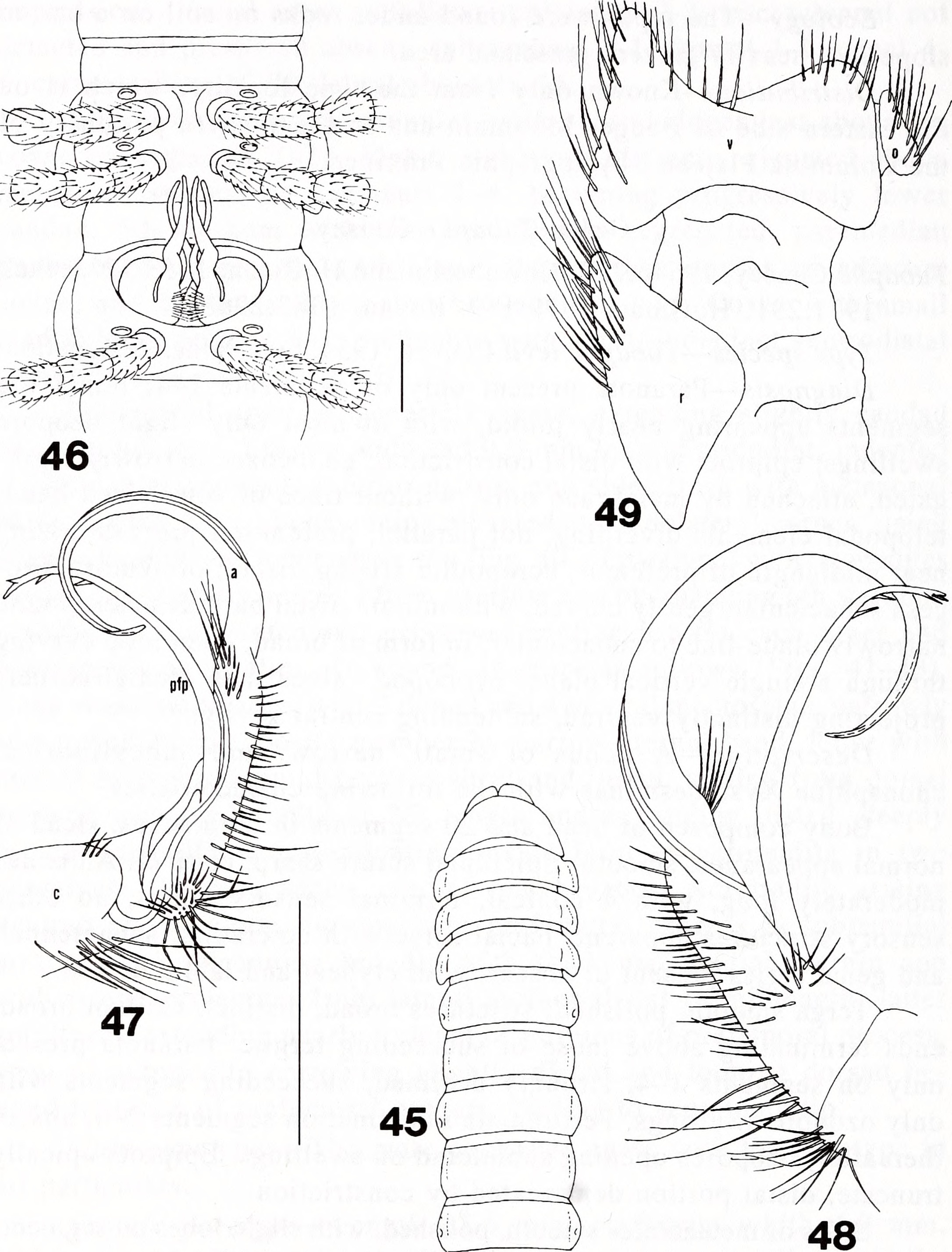
- Drawings of Tubaphe levii including the gonopods by Rowland Shelley

Scientific classification
- Kingdom: Animalia
- Phylum: Arthropoda
- Subphylum: Myriapoda
- Class: Diplopoda
- Order: Polydesmida
- Family: Xystodesmidae
- Genus: Tubaphe; Causey, 1954
- Species: T. levii

Binomial name
- Tubaphe levii Causey, 1954

Synonyms
- Species synonymy: Metaxycheir pacifica Shelley, 1990

= Tubaphe =

Genus of millipedes

Tubaphe is a genus of millipede in the family Xystodesmidae with a single described species, Tubaphe levii. The genus was erected by Nell B. Causey in 1954.

Tubaphe was described as having a simple gonopod with a two-pronged telopodite and lacking lacking paranota on segments six, eight, eleven, and fourteen. Shelley notes that T. levii has a nearly cylindrical body and is often lacking or nearly lacking paranota beyond the first four segments

Tubaphe levii was first described by N. B. Causey based on samples collected by Dr Herbert W Levi and Lorna R. Levi from the Graves Creek Campground on the Olympic Peninsula. The species was placed in a unique genus based in large part on the reduced paranota of all segments after the fourth. This feature distinguishes T. levii from all other American Xystodesmids.

The species is found on the northern parts of the Olympic peninsula (where it was first described from) as well as on the southern portions of Vancouver Island BC. The Vancouver island population was first described as Metaxycheir pacifica by Rowland M. Shelley in 1990 and later synonymized with T. levii by Dr Shelley in 1993.
