= Lourdesia =

Scientific classification
- Kingdom: Animalia
- Phylum: Arthropoda
- Subphylum: Myriapoda
- Class: Diplopoda
- Order: Polydesmida
- Family: Xystodesmidae
- Genus: Lourdesia; Shelley, 1991

Genus of millipedes

Lourdesia is a genus of millipedes belonging to the family Xystodesmidae. Its sole species, Lourdesia minuscula, is around 12.2 mm long, making it one of the smallest species in the family.

Species:

- Lourdesia minuscula Shelley, 1991
