= Montaphe =

Scientific classification
- Kingdom: Animalia
- Phylum: Arthropoda
- Subphylum: Myriapoda
- Class: Diplopoda
- Order: Polydesmida
- Family: Xystodesmidae
- Tribe: Chonaphini
- Genus: Montaphe; Chamberlin, 1949

Genus of millipedes

Montaphe is a genus of flat-backed millipedes in the family Xystodesmidae. There are at least two described species in Montaphe.

== Species ==
These two species belong to the genus Montaphe:

- Montaphe elrodi (Chamberlin, 1913)
- Montaphe paraphoena Shelley, 1994
