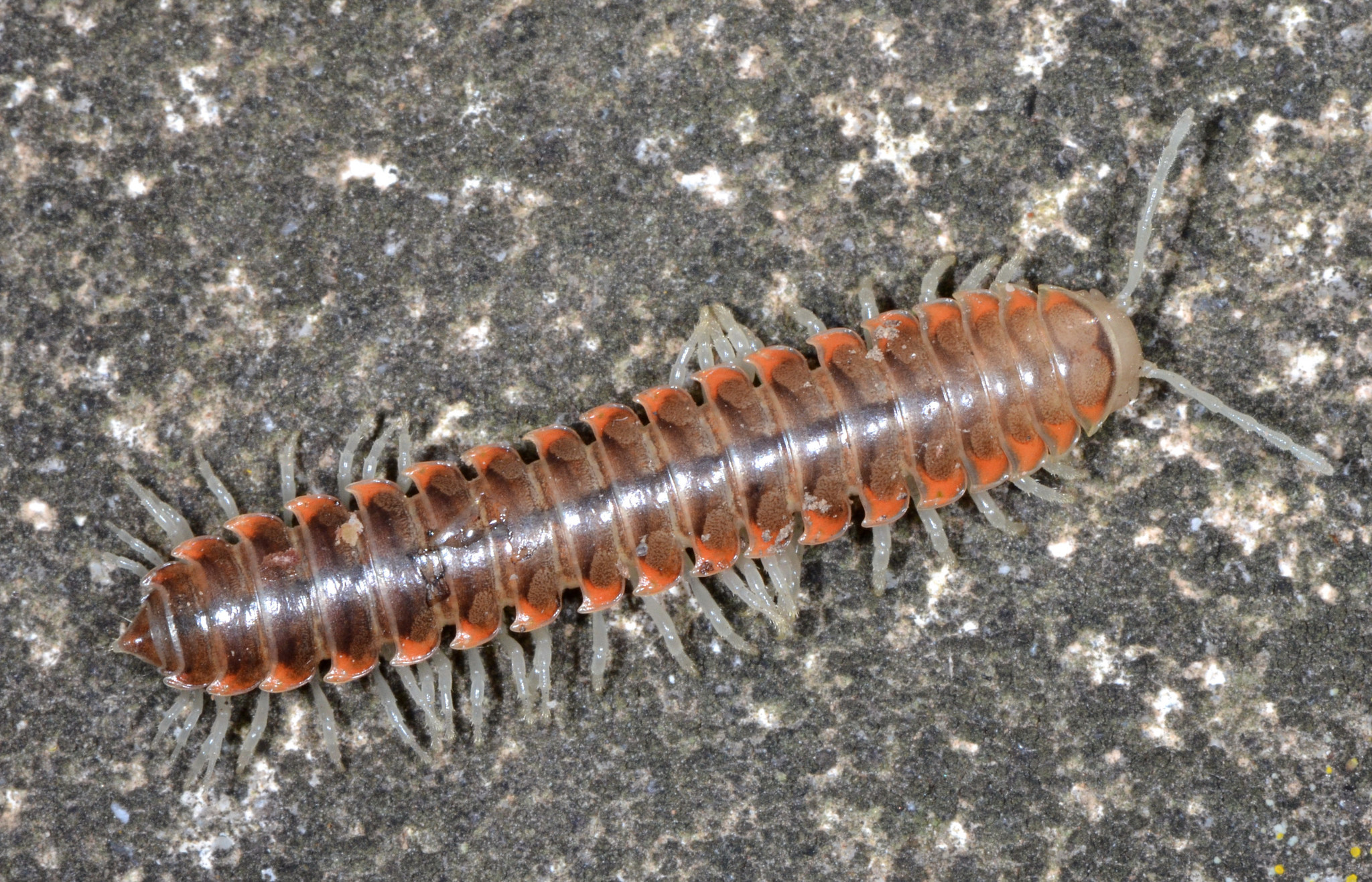
- Xystocheir dissecta

Scientific classification
- Kingdom: Animalia
- Phylum: Arthropoda
- Subphylum: Myriapoda
- Class: Diplopoda
- Order: Polydesmida
- Family: Xystodesmidae
- Tribe: Xystocheirini
- Genus: Xystocheir; Cook, 1904

Species
- see text

Synonyms
- Cheirauxus Chamberlin, 1949; Delocheir Chamberlin, 1949; Paimokia Chamberlin, 1941

= Xystocheir =

Genus of millipedes

Xystocheir is a genus of millipedes in the family Xystodesmidae. The genus is endemic to California in the United States, where it is distributed in the Coast Ranges and the Sierra Nevada.

Since a 1996 revision there have been 9 species classified in the genus:

- Xystocheir bistipita
- Xystocheir brachymacris
- Xystocheir dissecta
- Xystocheir modestior
- Xystocheir prolixorama
- Xystocheir reducta
- Xystocheir solenofurcata
- Xystocheir stenomacris
- Xystocheir stolonifera
