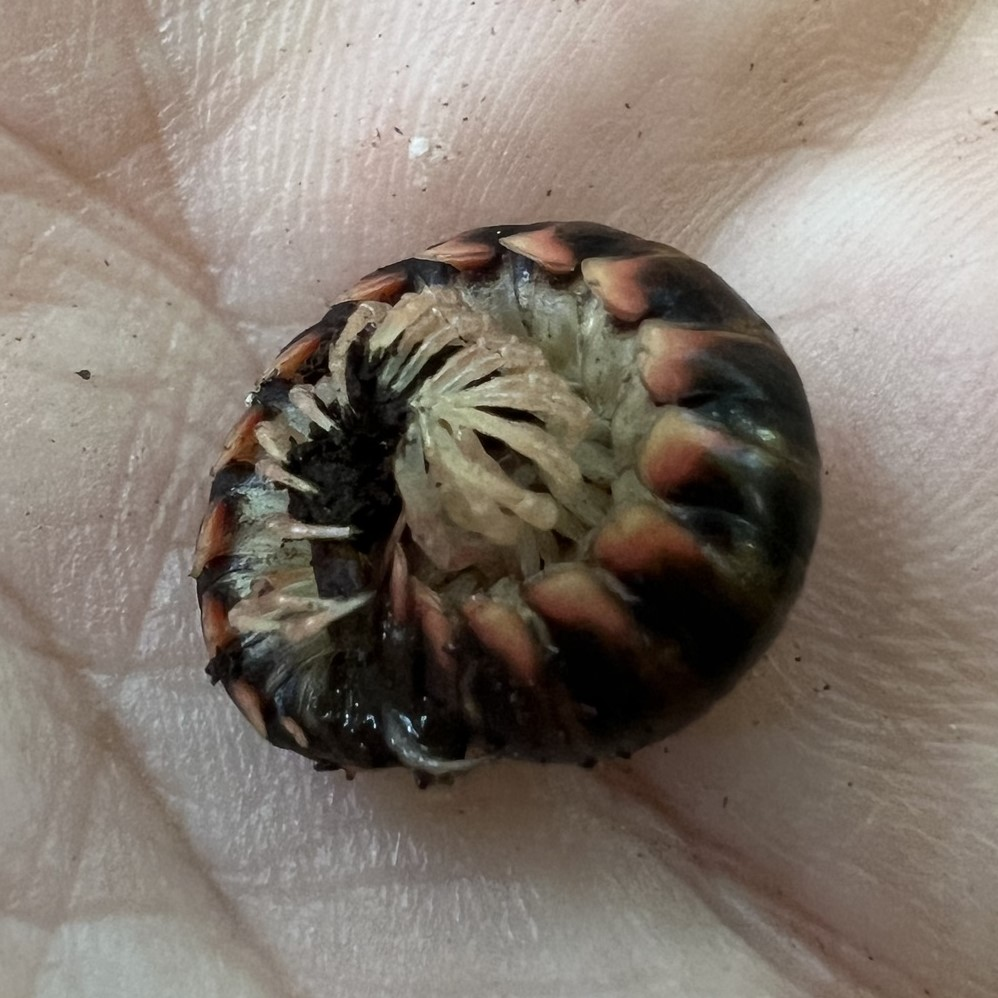

Scientific classification
- Kingdom: Animalia
- Phylum: Arthropoda
- Subphylum: Myriapoda
- Class: Diplopoda
- Order: Polydesmida
- Family: Xystodesmidae
- Genus: Erdelyia; Hoffman, 1963
- Species: E. saucra

Binomial name
- Erdelyia saucra Hoffman, 1962

= Erdelyia =

Erdelyia saucra

Genus of millipedes

Erdelyia is a genus of millipedes in the family Xystodesmidae. It is monotypic, being represented by the single species Erdelyia saucra. It is found in eastern North America.
