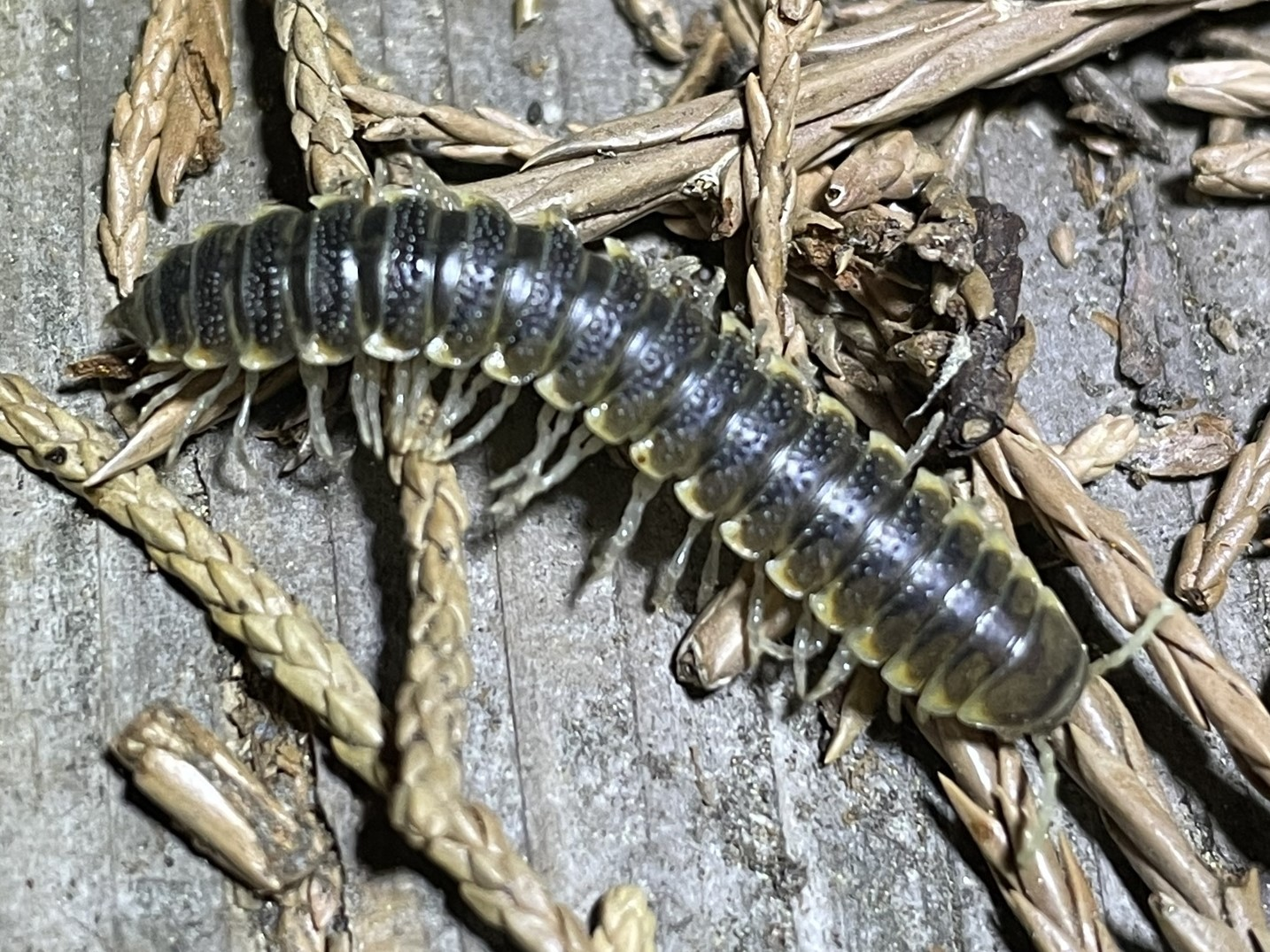
- Parcipromus gigantoarboricolus

Scientific classification
- Kingdom: Animalia
- Phylum: Arthropoda
- Subphylum: Myriapoda
- Class: Diplopoda
- Order: Polydesmida
- Family: Xystodesmidae
- Genus: Parcipromus; Shelley, 1995

= Parcipromus =

Genus of millipedes

Parcipromus is a genus of millipedes belonging to the family Xystodesmidae. The species of this genus are found in western North America.

== Species ==
The following species are recognised in the genus Parcipromus:

- Parcipromus cooki (Causey, 1955)
- Parcipromus gigantoarboricolus Shelley, 1995
- Parcipromus tiemanni Shelley, 1995
