= Wamokia =

Scientific classification
- Kingdom: Animalia
- Phylum: Arthropoda
- Subphylum: Myriapoda
- Class: Diplopoda
- Order: Polydesmida
- Family: Xystodesmidae
- Genus: Wamokia; Chamberlin, 1941

Genus of millipedes

Wamokia is a genus of millipedes belonging to the family Xystodesmidae.

The species of this genus are found in Western North America.

Species:

- Wamokia dentata Buckett & Gardner, 1968
- Wamokia discordis Buckett & Gardner, 1968
- Wamokia falcata Buckett & Gardner, 1968
- Wamokia hoffmani Buckett & Gardner, 1968
- Wamokia placerna Chamberlin, 1941
- Wamokia remota Buckett & Gardner, 1968
- Wamokia sierrae Buckett & Gardner, 1968
