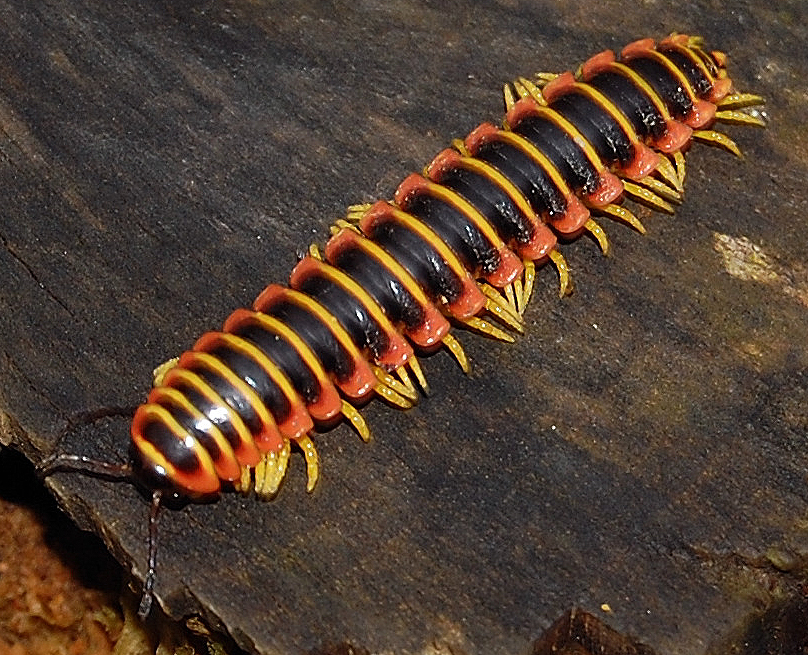
- Apheloria corrugata

Scientific classification
- Kingdom: Animalia
- Phylum: Arthropoda
- Subphylum: Myriapoda
- Class: Diplopoda
- Order: Polydesmida
- Suborder: Leptodesmidea
- Superfamily: Xystodesmoidea
- Family: Xystodesmidae; Cook, 1895

Subfamilies
- Melaphinae; Parafontariinae; Xystodesminae

Diversity
- c. 60 genera, 300+ species

Synonyms
- Fontariidae Attems, 1926; Eurydesmidae Chamberlin, 1950

= Xystodesmidae =

Family of millipedes

Xystodesmidae is a family of millipedes in the suborder Leptodesmidea within the order Polydesmida (the "flat-backed" or "keeled" millipedes). The family Xystodesmidae was created by the American biologist Orator F. Cook in 1895 and named after the genus Xystodesmus. This family includes more than 390 known species distributed among 62 genera. Many species, however, remain undescribed: for example, it is estimated that the genus Nannaria contains over 200 species, but only 25 were described as of 2006. By 2022, 78 species in Nannaria have been described.

== Distribution ==
Millipedes in this family are found across the Northern Hemisphere, with peak diversity in the Appalachian Mountains, where one-third of the 300 or so species occur. They are particularly abundant in deciduous broadleaf forests in the Mediterranean Basin, Africa, Asia, Central and North America, and Russia. Species in this family often have very small distributional areas, with many species only known from a single locality.

== Description ==
Xystodemids are characterized by a relatively broad and compact body shape and one or more spines on the second leg-segments (prefemoral spines) in most species. Millipedes in this family range from 8 mm to 85 mm in length, with moderately convex bodies that taper toward both the front and especially the rear end. The antennae are slender and long. The paranota are normally large and prominent.

Colors range from pitch black to pallid, often with vivid patterns. This family contains many colorful and distinctive species, including Apheloria corrugata of the eastern U.S. and Harpaphe haydeniana of the western U.S. The Sierra luminous millipedes of the genus Motyxia exhibit the only known examples of bioluminescence in the Polydesmida. Species of Apheloria and Brachoria in the Appalachians exhibit Müllerian mimicry, in which unrelated species resemble one another where they co-occur.

This family also includes the cave-dwelling genus Devillea, notable for having more than the 20 segments (counting the collum as the first segment and the telson as the last) usually found the Polydesmida. For example, in the species D. tuberculata, adult females have 22 segments and adult males have 21, with a corresponding increase in the number of leg pairs (35 in adult females and 32 in adult males, excluding the gonopods). Some species in this genus also exhibit variation in segment number within the same sex, for example, in D. subterranea, adult males can have as few as 19 segments or as many as 23. The species D. doderoi has the maximum number of segments recorded in this family (29, including the telson).

== Classification ==
The family is divided into three subfamilies: the Melaphinae with around 10 species, the Parafontariinae with a dozen species in a single genus, and the Xystodesminae, with many genera and species.

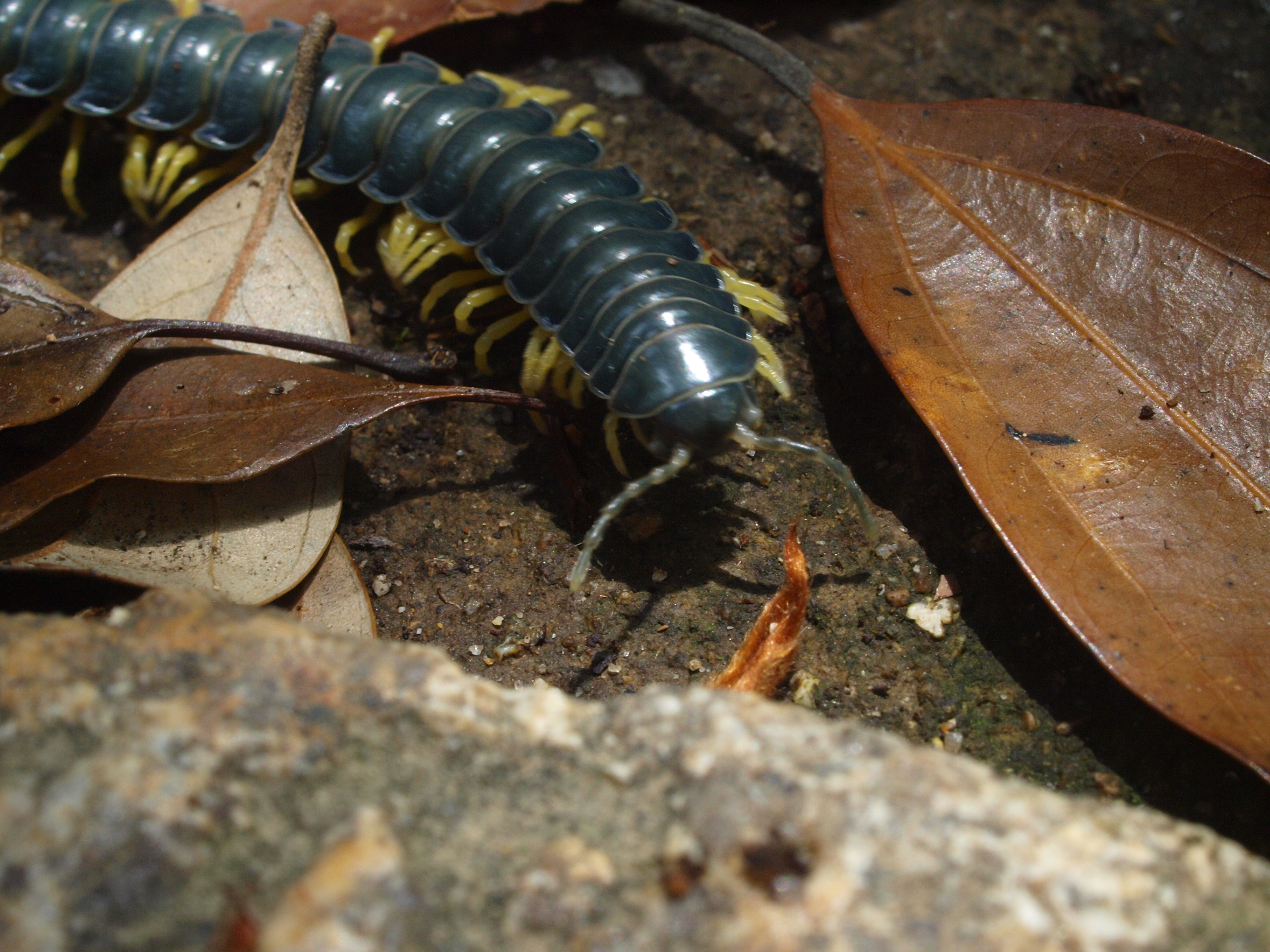
Parafontaria tonominea from Japan

=== Subfamily Melaphinae ===
Melaphini

- Melaphe
- Ochridaphe

=== Subfamily Parafontariinae ===
- Parafontaria

=== Subfamily Xystodesminae ===
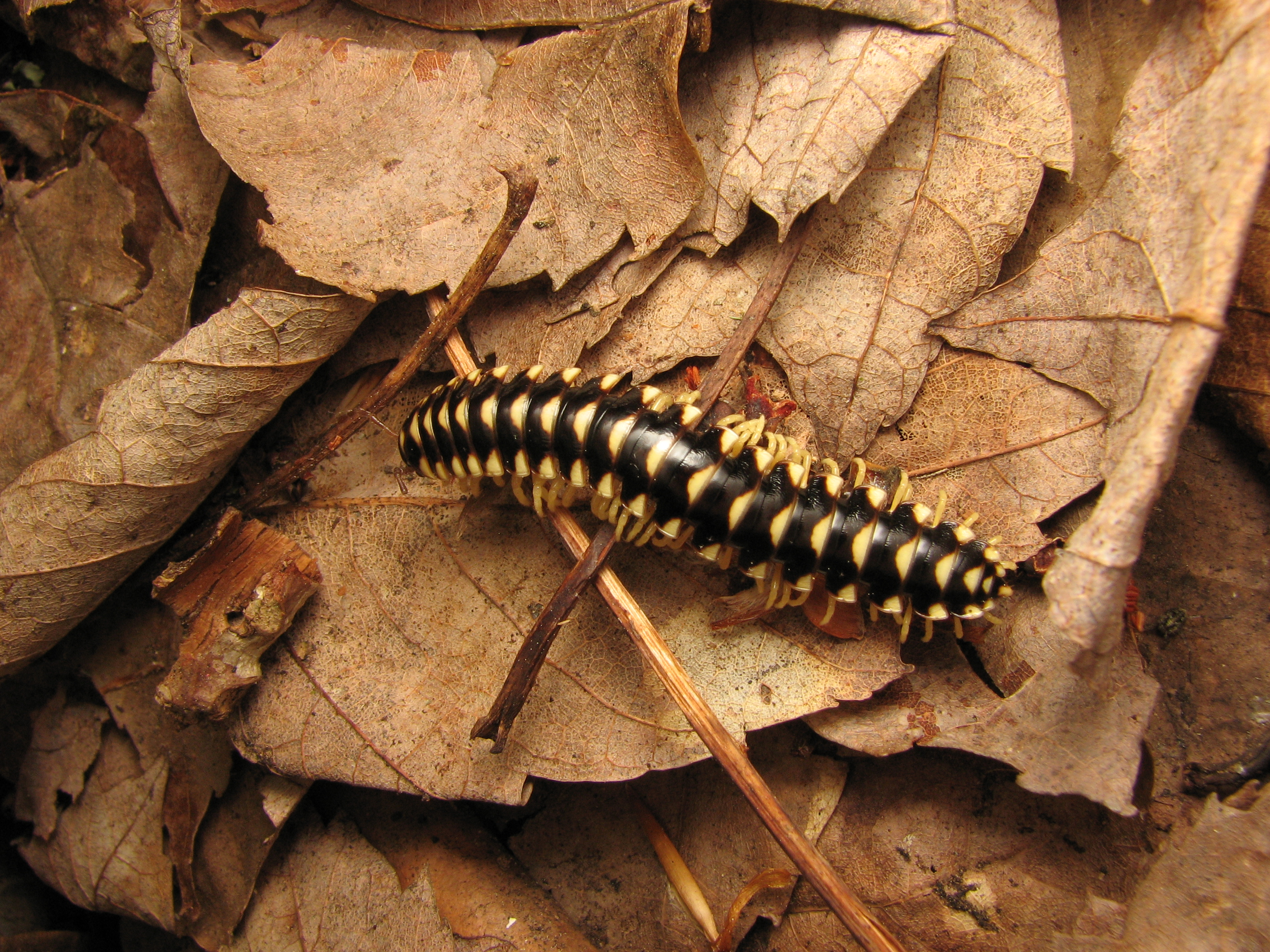
Unidentified Xystodesmidae, either Apheloria montana (Bollman) or Cherokia georgiana (Bollman). Purchase Knob, Smokies National Park, Haywood County, North Carolina, USA.

The subfamily Xystodesminae is subdivided into ten tribes, each ending in the suffix "-ini", although taxonomist Richard Hoffman stated in his 1999 checklist: "I am by no means satisfied that this is the definitive arrangement, nor that the tribal divisions of the Xystodesminae are entirely satisfactory either."

Apheloriini Hoffman, 1980

- Apheloria
- Appalachioria
- Brachoria
- Brevigonus
- Cheiropus
- Cleptoria
- Croatania
- Deltotaria
- Dixioria
- Dynoria
- Falloria
- Furcillaria
- Lyrranea
- Prionogonus
- Rudiloria
- Sigmoria
- Stelgipus

Chonaphini Verhoeff, 1941

- Chonaphe
- Metaxycheir
- Montaphe
- Selenocheir
- Semionellus
- Tubaphe

Devilleini Brölemann, 1916

- Devillea

Nannarini Hoffman, 1964

- Nannaria
- Oenomaea

Orophini Hoffman, 1964

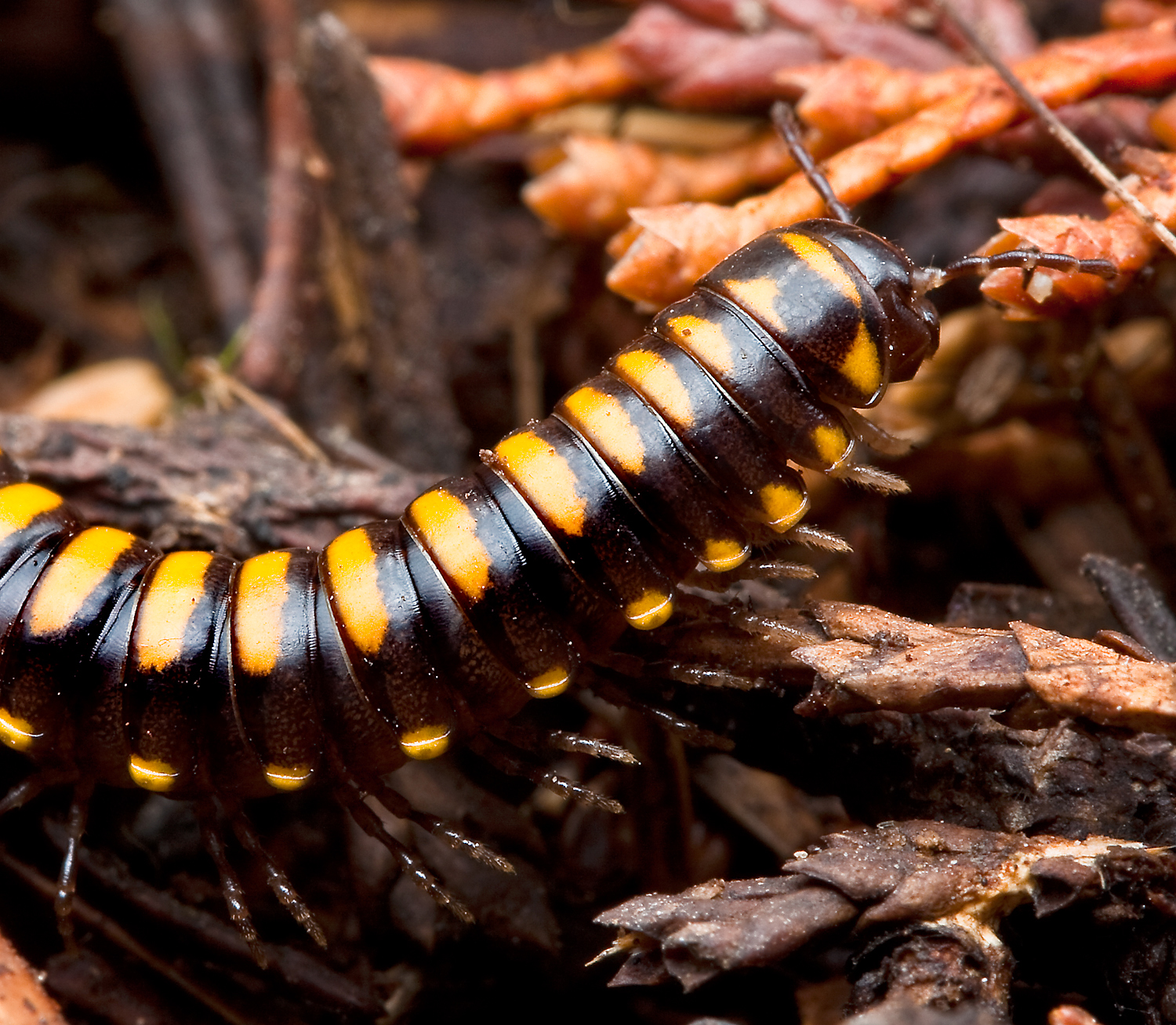
Orophe unicus, a species of northern Idaho

- Kiulinga
- Pamelaphe
- Orophe

Pachydesmini Hoffman, 1980

- Dicellarius
- Pachydesmus
- Thrinaxoria

Rhysodesmini Brolemann, 1916

- Boraria
- Cherokia
- Erdelyia
- Gyalostethus
- Pleuroloma
- Rhysodesmus
- Stenodesmus
- Caralinda
- Gonoessa
- Lourdesia
- Parvulodesmus

Sigmocheirini Causey, 1955

- Ochthocelata
- Sigmocheir

Xystocheirini Cook, 1904

- Anombrocheir
- Motyxia
- Parcipromus
- Wamokia
- Xystocheir

Xystodesmini Hoffman, 1980

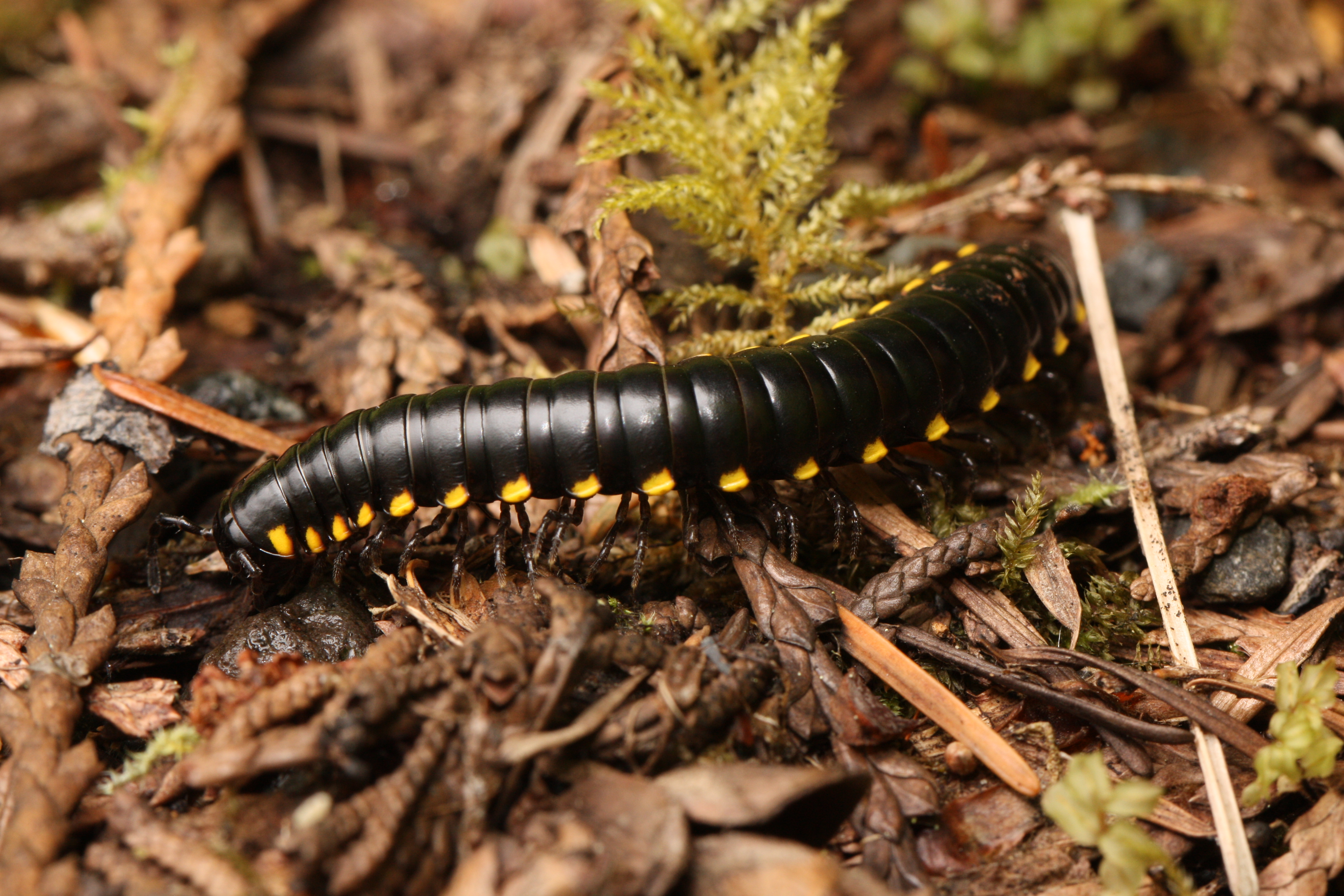
Harpaphe haydeniana, a species of the Pacific Northwest of the U.S. and Canada

- Harpaphe
- Isaphe
- Koreoaria
- Levizonus
- Riukiaria
- Thrinaphe
- Xystodesmus
- Yaetakaria

== See also ==
- List of Xystodesmidae genera
