= Cyrtodesmus humerosus =

Scientific classification
- Kingdom: Animalia
- Phylum: Arthropoda
- Subphylum: Myriapoda
- Class: Diplopoda
- Order: Polydesmida
- Family: Cyrtodesmidae
- Genus: Cyrtodesmus
- Species: C. humerosus

Binomial name
- Cyrtodesmus humerosus Loomis, 1974

Species of millipede

Cyrtodesmus humerosus is a species of millipede in the family Cyrtodesmidae that is endemic to San Vito, Costa Rica, where it was found on April 19, 1972.

== Description ==
The species is 12.5 millimetres (0.49 in) long and 3 millimetres (0.12 in) wide. The body have metazonites which are abruptly raised, and moderate convex. Their keels are flaring from metazonites and from ventrocaudal part of segments 2–19. The last 3 segments are at the right angle, with keels of segments 3–19 are shouldered in front and also have a junction with the outer portion of body itself. The surface of all segments have some sharp tubercles which are ending in short and thick spicule. The front of the head and its interantenna part is joined at the same level as its body, with the former is without raised angle next to the socket of the antennae. The anterior margin is broadly rounded from both sides. The front of the interantennal ridges are low, oblique and wide, with the back part tend to be more slender, granule and flat. It has weak and narrowly impressed vertex, with median sulcus is being present on its posterior half.

=== Segment and tubercle description ===
The front of the first segment is margined and have a row of irregularly shaped and raised tubercles. The second segment is further expanded and have a rounded posterior corner and lobe, which is flaring. Their basal surface is expanded broadly and deeply with a concave in front of the middle. Some of the tubercles can be seen in a row on segment 4, but the difference is minimal until segment 14, with the 4 others after segment 14 are bigger in both size and height. Tubercles do not change as fast as the segments, so there might be the same tubercle on a various segment. Segments from 3–5 are bilobed on their outer margin, and trilobed later in a process. Segment 19 has a posterior corner which is less than a square in size.

The sternum of their sixth and seventh leg is wider and strongly convex from both sides, while the ninth leg is wide, but doesn't have a tubercle on the outside or near coxa. Their apex have a bifurcated branch, while their gonopod is extended beyond the coxae of adjacent legs and is hemispherical. The females have a nearly straight ventral crest on the third segment which is rising from the sides.
