= Cyrtodesmus lobatus =

Scientific classification
- Kingdom: Animalia
- Phylum: Arthropoda
- Subphylum: Myriapoda
- Class: Diplopoda
- Order: Polydesmida
- Family: Cyrtodesmidae
- Genus: Cyrtodesmus
- Species: C. lobatus

Binomial name
- Cyrtodesmus lobatus Loomis, 1974

Species of millipede

Cyrtodesmus lobatus is a species of millipede in the family Cyrtodesmidae. It is endemic to San Vito, Costa Rica, where it was first collected on April 19, 1972. The species was described by Harold F. Loomis in 1974.

== Description ==
The species female is 14 millimetres (0.55 in) long and 2.8 millimetres (0.11 in) wide. The body have strong convex of the dorsum. Their lateral keels are flaring from the third segment and middle of the body and ending on the sides of metazonites. The surface is the same for all segments that don't have setae or spicules, but is coated everywhere else with organic matter, which is quite thin on tubercles of the apex part. Species head have thick, oblique, and short ridges on the interantennal parts, while they themselves are dark coloured, with a deeply narrow but separated channel. The spaces between those parts are swollen in front. It also has a free and raised squared corner, which is located next to the antenna.
