= Furcillaria =

Scientific classification
- Kingdom: Animalia
- Phylum: Arthropoda
- Subphylum: Myriapoda
- Class: Diplopoda
- Order: Polydesmida
- Family: Xystodesmidae
- Genus: Furcillaria; Shelley, 1981

Genus of millipedes

Furcillaria is listed a genus of flat-backed millipedes in the family Xystodesmidae by several references. In 2021, however, authorities deemed Furcillaria to be a junior synonym of Sigmoria. Accordingly, other references reject Furcillaria as a valid genus.

== Species ==
The genus Furcillaria includes the following four species:

- Furcillaria aequalis Shelley, 1981
- Furcillaria convoluta Shelley, 1981
- Furcillaria laminata Shelley, 1981
- Furcillaria thrinax (Shelley, 1982)
