= Furcillaria aequalis =

Scientific classification
- Kingdom: Animalia
- Phylum: Arthropoda
- Subphylum: Myriapoda
- Class: Diplopoda
- Order: Polydesmida
- Family: Xystodesmidae
- Genus: Furcillaria
- Species: F. aequalis

Binomial name
- Furcillaria aequalis Shelley, 1981

Species of millipede

Furcillaria aequalis is listed by some references as a North American species of flat-backed millipede in the family Xystodesmidae. In 2021, however, authorities deemed Furcillaria to be a junior synonym of Sigmoria. Accordingly, other references accept this synonymy and consider Sigmoria aequalis to be the valid name for this species.
