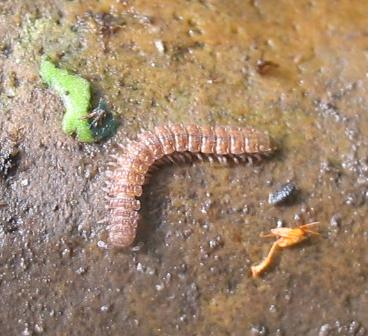
- Polydesmus

Scientific classification
- Kingdom: Animalia
- Phylum: Arthropoda
- Subphylum: Myriapoda
- Class: Diplopoda
- Order: Polydesmida
- Suborder: Polydesmidea; Leach, 1815

Families
- Cryptodesmidae Karsch, 1880; Cyrtodesmidae Cook, 1896; Dorsoporidae Loomis, 1958; Fuhrmannodesmidae Brolemann, 1916; Haplodesmidae Cook, 1895; Macrosternodesmidae Brolemann, 1916; Nearctodesmidae Chamberlin & Hoffman, 1950; Oniscodesmidae De Saussure, 1860; Polydesmidae Leach, 1815; Pyrgodesmidae Silvestri, 1896

= Polydesmidea =

Suborder of millipedes

Polydesmidea is a suborder of flat-backed millipedes under the order Polydesmida.
