= Eurymerodesmus melacis =

Scientific classification
- Kingdom: Animalia
- Phylum: Arthropoda
- Subphylum: Myriapoda
- Class: Diplopoda
- Order: Polydesmida
- Family: Eurymerodesmidae
- Genus: Eurymerodesmus
- Species: E. melacis

Binomial name
- Eurymerodesmus melacis Chamberlin & Mulaik, 1941

Species of millipede

Eurymerodesmus melacis is a species of flat-backed millipede in the family Eurymerodesmidae. It is found in North America.
