= Seminellogon bituberculosus =

Scientific classification
- Kingdom: Animalia
- Phylum: Arthropoda
- Subphylum: Myriapoda
- Class: Diplopoda
- Order: Polydesmida
- Family: Aphelidesmidae
- Genus: Seminellogon
- Species: S. bituberculosus

Binomial name
- Seminellogon bituberculosus (Loomis, 1974)

Synonyms
- Amplinus bituberculosus Loomis, 1974

Species of millipede

Seminellogon bituberculosus is a species of millipede in the family Aphelidesmidae that is endemic to San Vito, Costa Rica, where it was found on 17–18 April 1972.

== Description ==
The males of the species are 53–55 millimetres (2.1–2.2 in) long and 8 millimetres (0.31 in) wide, while females are of the same length but 8.5 millimetres (0.33 in) in width. The colour is a bit different from A. magnus. The head have a deep median sulcus, which is sharply impressed and is extended between antennae and almost next to the posterior edge of the vertex. The vertex is swelled in front and is large. Their clypeus have 4 macrosetae, which are equidistant across the middle. The surface of the first segment is almost smooth and have dorsum of segments that are coriaceus and shining at the end of the body. The metazonites ventral surface is conic and tuberculate at the same time, and is located next to the keels, or rather to the posterior base which is next to it. Tubercles are continued throughout the surface and are advancing into the posterior margin. Segment 17 sternum is adjacent to the whole coxa which is elevated. The ridge is elongated and ends on anterior sterna, which have a rounded tubercle. The last segments sides are parallel and end up with a rounded and acute apex. The gonopods have a bent mesad branch, which goes over the opposite branch. The opening of the gonopod have a posterior with raised rim that ends into an angular and sometimes rounded shoulder.
