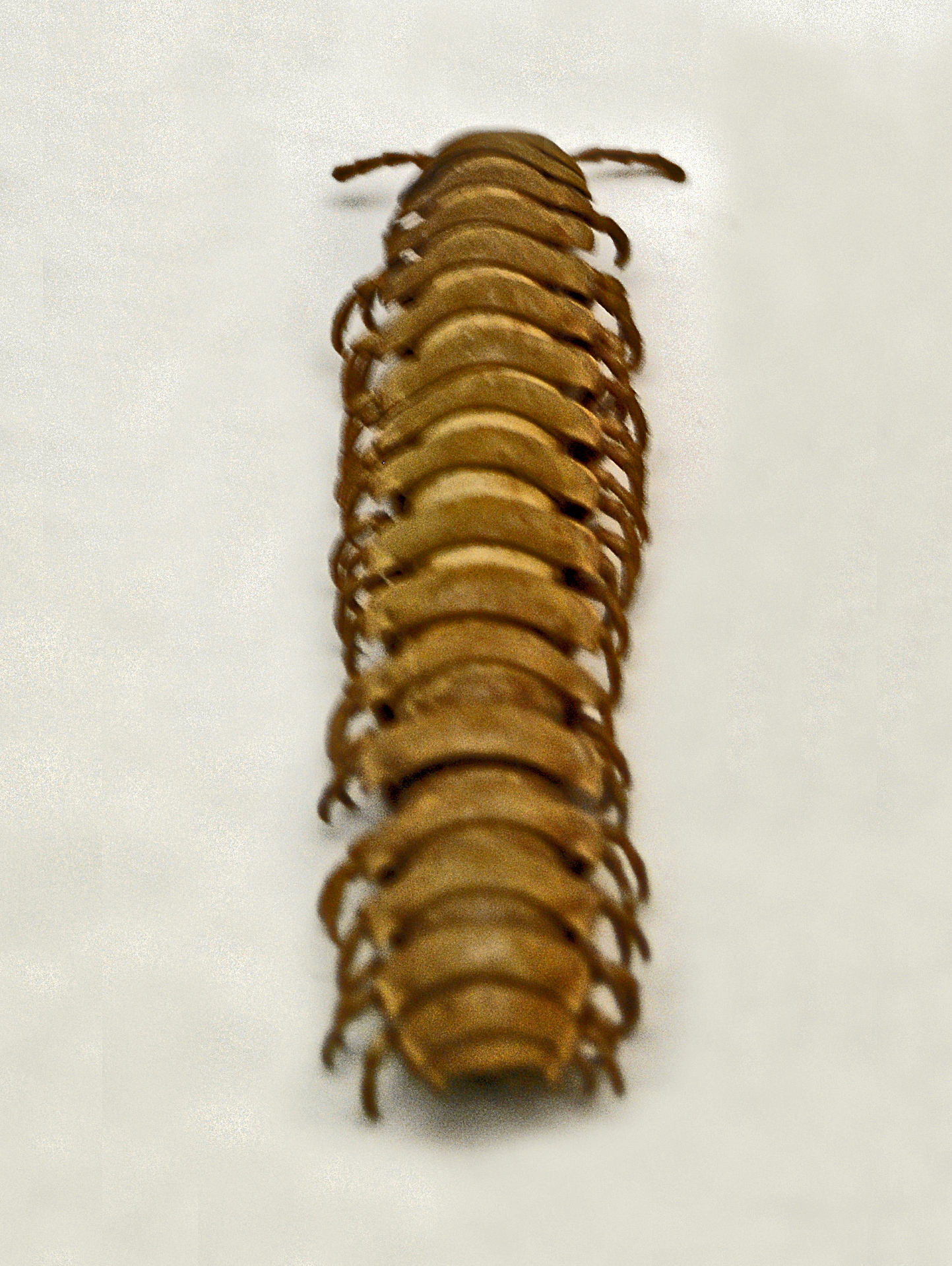
- Aulodesmus mossambicus from Tanzania

Scientific classification
- Kingdom: Animalia
- Phylum: Arthropoda
- Subphylum: Myriapoda
- Class: Diplopoda
- Order: Polydesmida
- Family: Gomphodesmidae
- Genus: Aulodesmus
- Species: A. mossambicus

Binomial name
- Aulodesmus mossambicus (Peters, 1855)

Synonyms
- Aulodesmus laticollis Attems, 1928; Aulodesmus mossambicus laticollis Attems, 1928; Aulodesmus mossambicus mossambicus (Peters, 1855); Eurydesmus mossambicus (Peters, 1855); Polydesmus mossambicus Peters, 1855

= Aulodesmus mossambicus =

Species of millipede

Aulodesmus mossambicus is a species of millipedes belonging to the family Gomphodesmidae. This species can be found in Mozambique and Tanzania.
