= Cyrtodesmus depressus =

Scientific classification
- Kingdom: Animalia
- Phylum: Arthropoda
- Subphylum: Myriapoda
- Class: Diplopoda
- Order: Polydesmida
- Family: Cyrtodesmidae
- Genus: Cyrtodesmus
- Species: C. depressus

Binomial name
- Cyrtodesmus depressus Loomis, 1974

Species of millipede

Cyrtodesmus depressus is a species of millipede in the family Cyrtodesmidae that can be found in San Vito, Costa Rica, where it was found on 17–18 April 1972 by Harold F. Loomis.

== Description ==
The males of the species are 10 millimetres (0.39 in) long and 2.2 millimetres (0.087 in) wide, while females are a bit bigger. The convex of dorsum is moderate. Their metazonites and keels are dirty but not everywhere. The tubercles is one of such examples, which also have a shining area. The first segment is almost hidden by the second one, with segments 3–17 are flaring outward. The second segment have keels which are expanded. Their margins are not lobed and therefore are not undulated either. Segment 15 is almost straight and has no visible marginal lobes. The last segment has 2 tubercles which are submedian.

The gonopods look a lot like those of C. hispidulosus, with only two differences; the current species does not have spicules and has limited organic coating. It also has a hidden outer joint, with a lateral surface and large tubercle which is also rounded. They also have two small and transverse tubercles which are located on the sternum of their ninth row of legs. It has a large anterior marginal lobe which is located on each angle from the outside. Their surface is quite swollen from both sides and covered with tubercles which are sharp and conical in shape. The tubercles themselves are small, low, are poorly defined, and not numerous. The species also have 3 tubercles with blunt ends. Their convex dorsum has a broad and joint coxal, which is ventral and is a little higher than the coxae of the adjacent legs. The females have a nearly straight ventral crest on the third segment which is rising from the sides. Cyrtodesmus depressus has a supplementary margin identical to that of C. dentatus.
