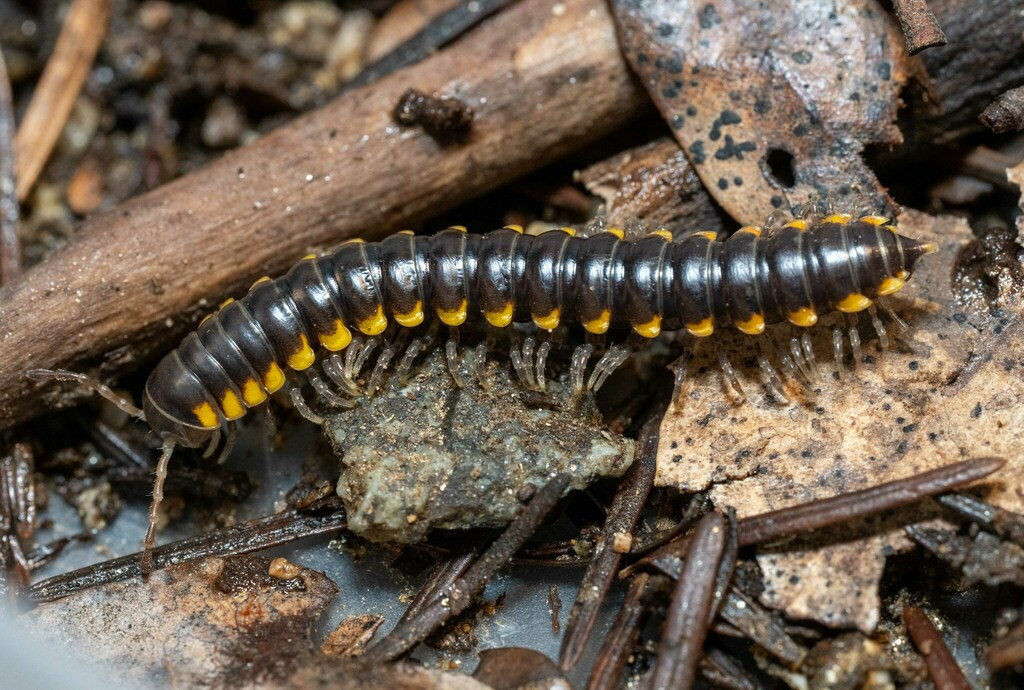

Scientific classification
- Kingdom: Animalia
- Phylum: Arthropoda
- Subphylum: Myriapoda
- Class: Diplopoda
- Order: Polydesmida
- Family: Xystodesmidae
- Genus: Selenocheir
- Species: S. arcuata

Binomial name
- Selenocheir arcuata Shelley, 1994

= Selenocheir arcuata =

Species of millipede

Selenocheir arcuata is a species of Xystodesmid millipede found in Northern California. The species was first described by Rowland M. Shelley in 1994 based on samples collected by C. Smith, J. Clover, and F. Ennik in 1972.

== Description ==
At the time of writing the species description in 1994, Shelley only had preserved specimens available and so the color in life was unknown and the description was incomplete.

Selenocheir arcuata is typically brown to black in ground color with yellow paranota. The legs are reddish to grey in color. The caudolateral corners of the paranota of the mid-segments are rounded. The shape of the paranota distinguishes S. arcuata from Harpaphe haydeniana which is also present in most of its distribution; H. haydeniana has been described to have acutely angled caudolateral corners.

== Distribution ==
S. arcuata is found in the foothills northwest of the Sacramento Valley and down into the northern Coast Range as far south as Mendocino County.
