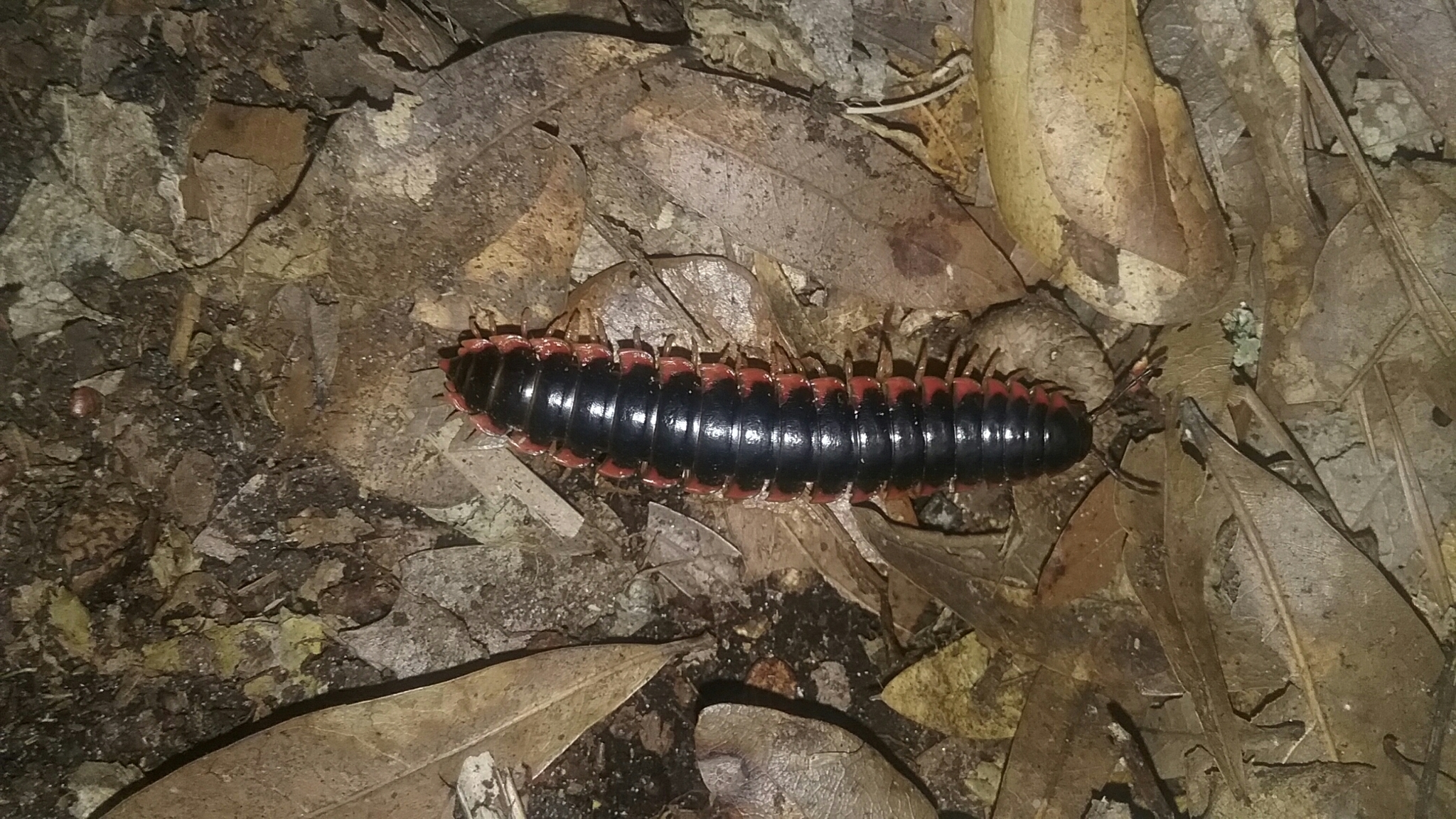

Scientific classification
- Kingdom: Animalia
- Phylum: Arthropoda
- Subphylum: Myriapoda
- Class: Diplopoda
- Order: Polydesmida
- Family: Xystodesmidae
- Genus: Sigmoria
- Species: S. australis

Binomial name
- Sigmoria australis Shelley, 1986

= Sigmoria australis =

Species of millipede

Sigmoria australis is a species of flat-backed millipede in the family Xystodesmidae. It is found in North America.
