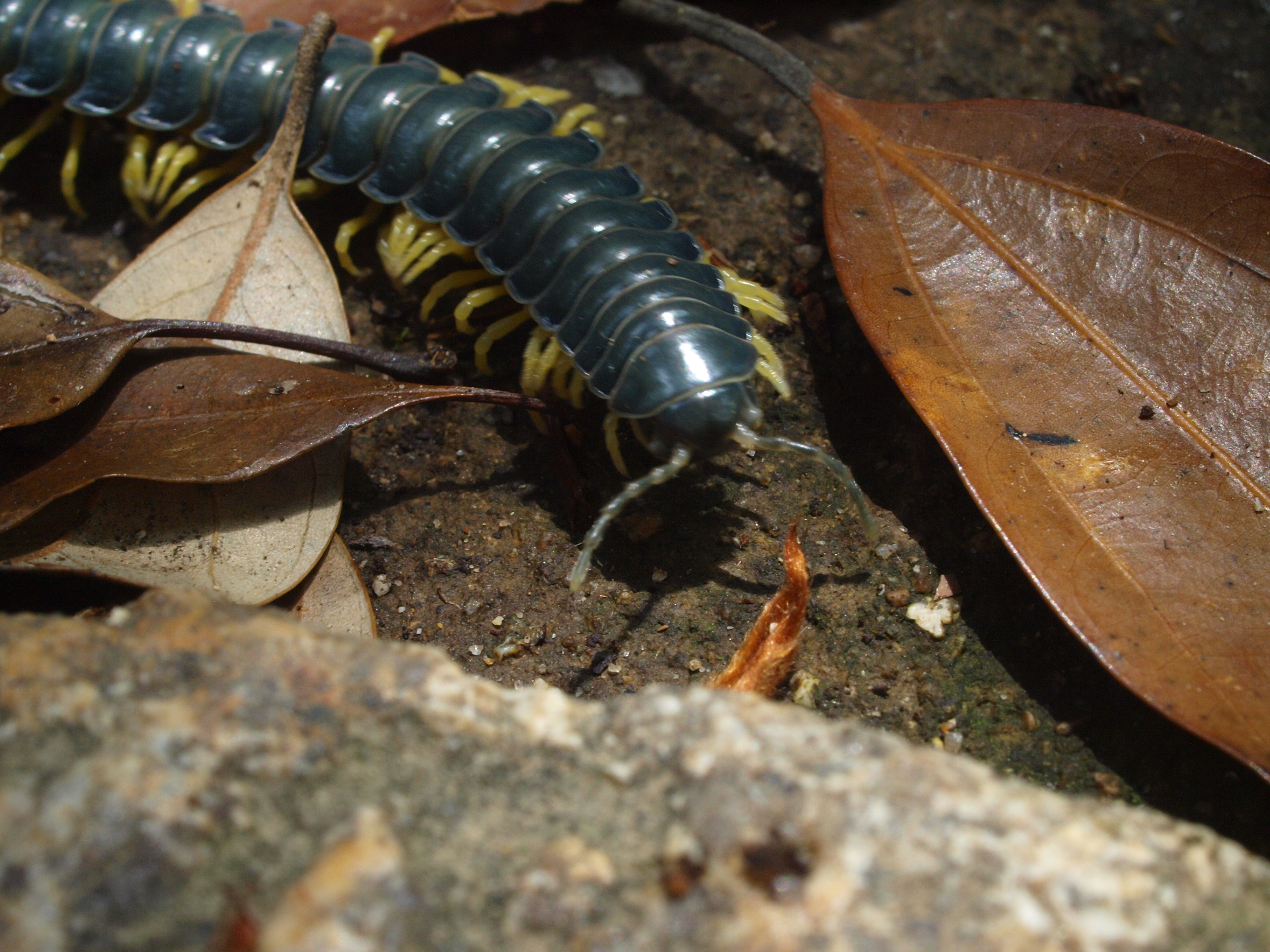
- Parafontaria tonominea (Xystodesmidae) of Japan

Scientific classification
- Kingdom: Animalia
- Phylum: Arthropoda
- Subphylum: Myriapoda
- Class: Diplopoda
- Order: Polydesmida
- Suborder: Leptodesmidea; Brölemann, 1916

Families
- Aphelidesmidae Brolemann, 1916; Chelodesmidae Cook, 1895; Eurymerodesmidae Causey, 1951; Euryuridae Pocock, 1909; Holistophallidae Silvestri, 1909; Platyrhacidae Pocock, 1895; Rhachodesmidae Carl, 1903; Sphaeriodesmidae Humbert & De Saussure, 1869; Tridontomidae Loomis & Hoffman, 1962; Xystodesmidae Cook, 1895

= Leptodesmidea =

Suborder of millipedes

Leptodesmidea is a suborder of flat-backed millipedes under the order Polydesmida.
