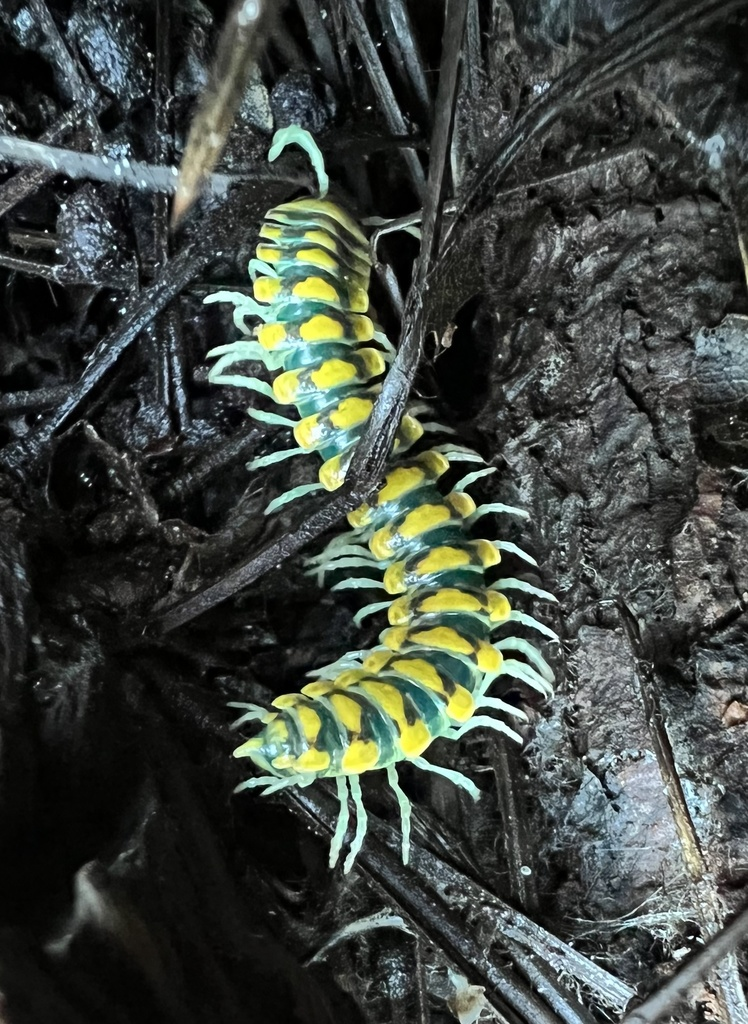

Scientific classification
- Kingdom: Animalia
- Phylum: Arthropoda
- Subphylum: Myriapoda
- Class: Diplopoda
- Order: Polydesmida
- Family: Xystodesmidae
- Genus: Sigmocheir
- Species: S. calaveras

Binomial name
- Sigmocheir calaveras Chamberlin, 1951

Synonyms
- Species synonymy: Sigmocheir dohenyi Chamberlin, 1953; Tuolumnia danehyi Chamberlin, 1953; Sigmocheir (Tuolumnia) danehyi Bucket, 1964

= Sigmocheir calaveras =

Species of millipede

Sigmocheir calaveras is a species of millipede in the family Xystodesmidae. The species in endemic to California and found in the foothills of the Sierra Nevada mountains.

== Description ==
Sigmocheir calaveras is the type species for the genus Sigmocheir and was described by Ralph V. Chamberlin in 1951 based on a sample collected by G. Moore from Crystal-Stanislaus Cave, Calaveras County in 1950. The species has a distinctive trimaculate pattern with an ovoid mid-tergite yellow spot and yellow paranota. The paranota on S. calaveras arise high on the tergites giving the millipedes a rather flat appearance.

== Range ==
This species occupies a central, and slightly overlapping range, with the additional representative of the genus. It is found in the foothills of the Sierra Nevada mountains east of Stockton and Modesto Individuals of the genus have been reported in Amador, Calaveras, and Tuolumne counties. The species is often, but not always found associated with cave environments.
