= Sigmoria nigrimontis =

Scientific classification
- Kingdom: Animalia
- Phylum: Arthropoda
- Subphylum: Myriapoda
- Class: Diplopoda
- Order: Polydesmida
- Family: Xystodesmidae
- Genus: Sigmoria
- Species: S. nigrimontis

Binomial name
- Sigmoria nigrimontis (Chamberlin, 1947)

Species of millipede

Sigmoria nigrimontis is a species of flat-backed millipede in the family Xystodesmidae. It is found in North America.

== Subspecies ==
These four subspecies belong to the species Sigmoria nigrimontis:

- Sigmoria nigrimontis angulosa Shelley, 1981^{i c g}
- Sigmoria nigrimontis intermedia (Hoffman, 1948)^{i c g}
- Sigmoria nigrimontis nigrimontis (Chamberlin, 1947)^{i c g}
- Sigmoria nigrimontis unicoi Shelley, 1981^{i c g}

Data sources: i = ITIS, c = Catalogue of Life, g = GBIF, b = Bugguide.net
