= Sigmoria ainsliei =

Scientific classification
- Kingdom: Animalia
- Phylum: Arthropoda
- Subphylum: Myriapoda
- Class: Diplopoda
- Order: Polydesmida
- Family: Xystodesmidae
- Genus: Sigmoria
- Species: S. ainsliei

Binomial name
- Sigmoria ainsliei (Chamberlin, 1921)

Species of millipede

Sigmoria ainsliei is a species of flat-backed millipede in the family Xystodesmidae. It is native to eastern Tennessee.

== Description ==
Adults of this species can reach lengths greater than 50 millimeters and widths greater than 12 millimeters. Individuals of this species typically have red paranota.

== Range and distribution ==
S. ainsliei has a small distribution, occurring from State Route 73 in the Great Smoky Mountains National Park to just north of the French Broad River in Knoxville, TN. Specimens of this species have been collected from Knox, Sevier, and Blount counties. It is suspected to also be present in Loudon county, although suitable habitat is rare.

== Taxonomy ==
The species was first described as Apheloria ainsliei by biologist Ralph V. Chamberlin in 1921. It was later moved into the genus Falloria before the genus was deprecated as a junior subjective synonym. The current accepted name is Sigmoria ainsliei.

The holotype, collected from Knox County, is housed at Harvard University's Museum of Comparative Zoology in Cambridge, MA.

== Ecology ==
Millipedes of this species in the Great Smoky Mountains National Park typically occupy moist soils in rhododendron groves. In areas of their range where this environment is not available, they are most commonly found beneath the leaf litter of hardwood forests.

The invasive Asian jumping worm (Amynthas agrestis) competes with S. ainsliei for food. Thus, millipedes in soils where A. agrestis are present may have reduced lifespans; however, this competition may also reduce the worms' reproduction potential.
