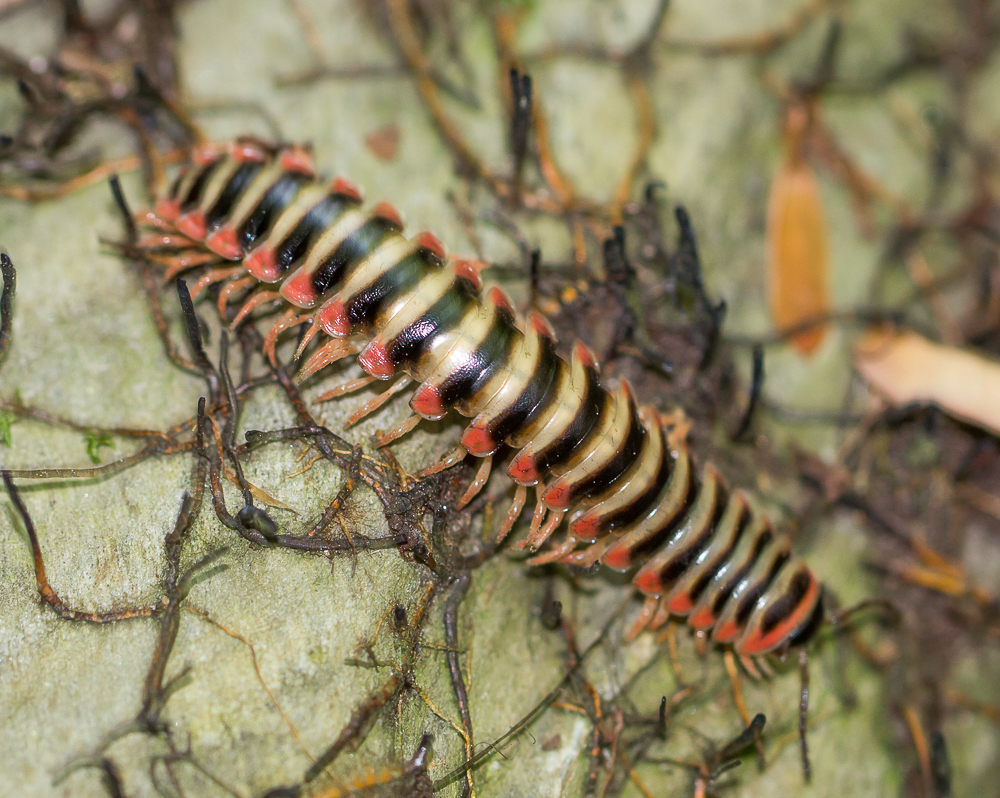

Scientific classification
- Kingdom: Animalia
- Phylum: Arthropoda
- Subphylum: Myriapoda
- Class: Diplopoda
- Order: Polydesmida
- Family: Xystodesmidae
- Genus: Sigmoria
- Species: S. nantahalae

Binomial name
- Sigmoria nantahalae Hoffman, 1958

= Sigmoria nantahalae =

Species of millipede

Sigmoria nantahalae is a species of flat-backed millipede in the family Xystodesmidae. It is found in North America.
