= Selenocheir =

Scientific classification
- Kingdom: Animalia
- Phylum: Arthropoda
- Subphylum: Myriapoda
- Class: Diplopoda
- Order: Polydesmida
- Family: Xystodesmidae
- Tribe: Chonaphini
- Genus: Selenocheir; Shelley, 1994

Genus of millipedes

Selenocheir is a genus of flat-backed millipedes in the family Xystodesmidae. There are at least three described species in Selenocheir.

== Species ==
These three species belong to the genus Selenocheir:

- Selenocheir arcuata Shelley, 1994
- Selenocheir directa Shelley, 1994
- Selenocheir sinuata Shelley, 1994
