= Sigmoria rubromarginata =

Scientific classification
- Kingdom: Animalia
- Phylum: Arthropoda
- Subphylum: Myriapoda
- Class: Diplopoda
- Order: Polydesmida
- Family: Xystodesmidae
- Genus: Sigmoria
- Species: S. rubromarginata

Binomial name
- Sigmoria rubromarginata (Bollman, 1888)

Species of millipede

Sigmoria rubromarginata is a species of flat-backed millipede in the family Xystodesmidae. It is found in North America.
