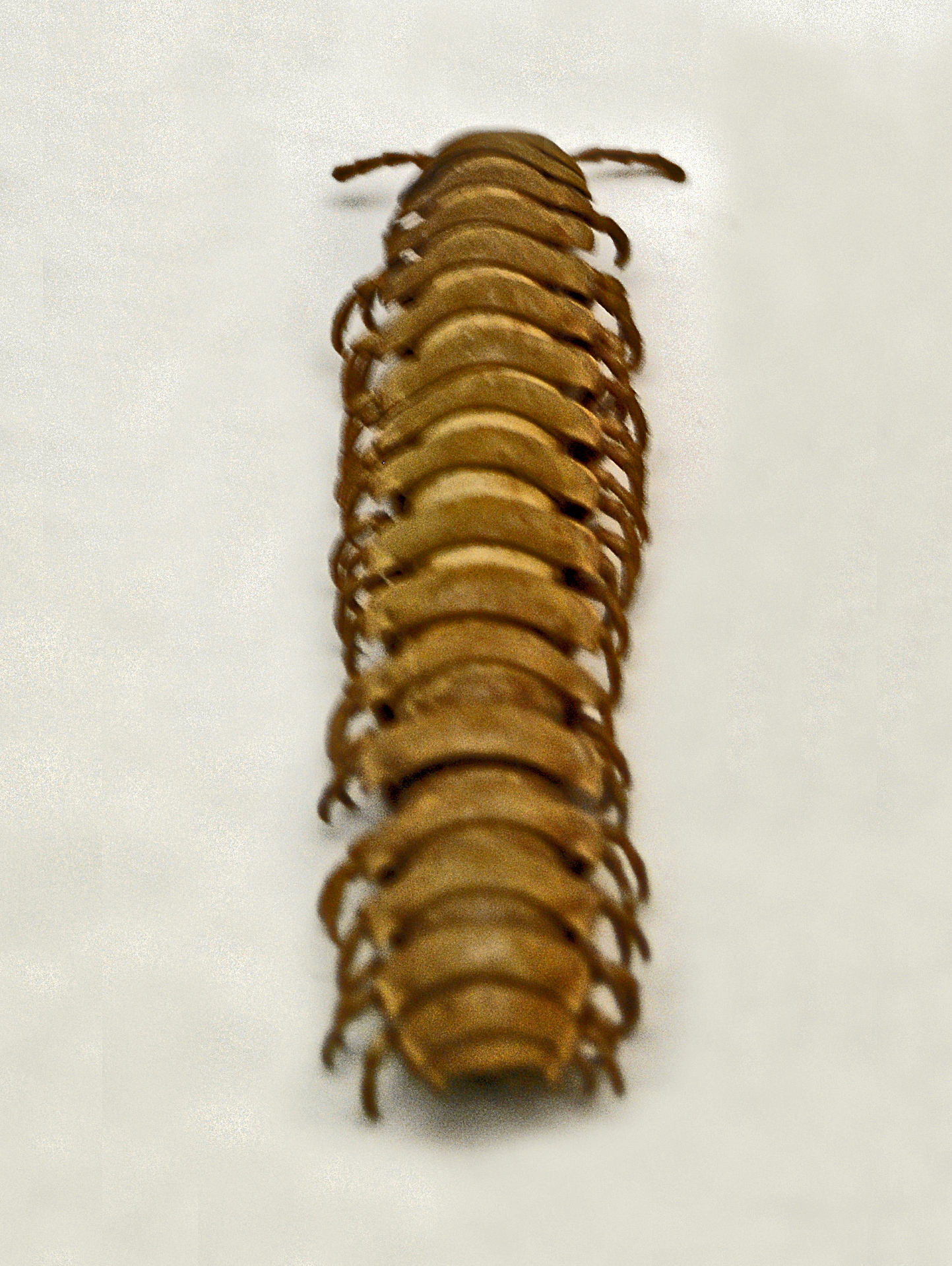
- Aulodesmus mossambicus from Tanzania

Scientific classification
- Kingdom: Animalia
- Phylum: Arthropoda
- Subphylum: Myriapoda
- Class: Diplopoda
- Order: Polydesmida
- Family: Gomphodesmidae
- Subfamily: Gomphodesminae
- Tribe: Aulodesmini
- Genus: Aulodesmus; Cook, 1896

= Aulodesmus =

Genus of millipedes

Aulodesmus is a genus of millipedes belonging to the family Gomphodesmidae.

== Species ==
- Aulodesmus eminens
- Aulodesmus levigatus
- Aulodesmus mossambicus
- Aulodesmus oxygonus
- Aulodesmus perarmatus
- Aulodesmus peringueyi
- Aulodesmus rugosus
- Aulodesmus trepidans
- Aulodesmus tuberosus
