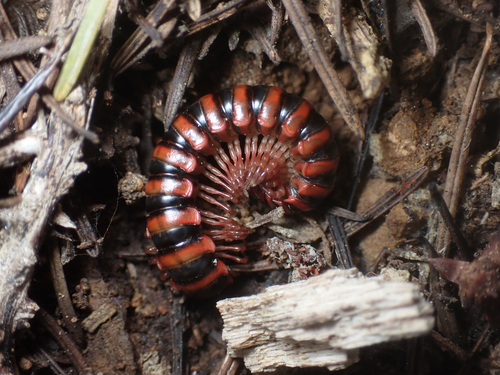

Scientific classification
- Kingdom: Animalia
- Phylum: Arthropoda
- Subphylum: Myriapoda
- Class: Diplopoda
- Order: Polydesmida
- Family: Xystodesmidae
- Genus: Selenocheir
- Species: S. sinuata

Binomial name
- Selenocheir sinuata Shelley, 1994

= Selenocheir sinuata =

Species of millipede

Selenocheir sinuata is a species of flat-backed millipede in the family Xystodesmidae, endemic to Northern California. The Species was first described by Rowland M. Shelley in 1994 based on samples collected by J. S. Buckett and M. R. Gardner in 1966

== Description ==
Selenocheir sinuata often has a banded color pattern with black metaterga and reddish to orange/yellow tergites. The color on the tergites is also sometimes incomplete with the paranota and central portion of the tergites having color and the mid portions to either side black.

Populations of S sinuata are found in the foothills bordering the northern portions of the Sacramento Valley from Humboldt county east to Shasta county and south to El Dorado county.
