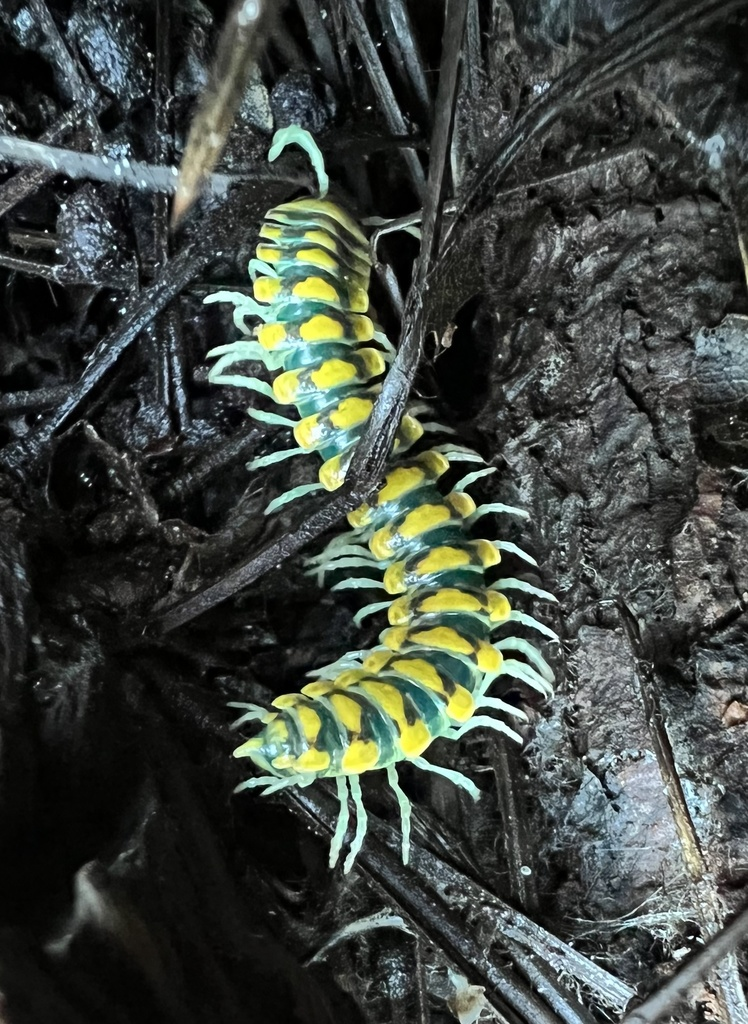

Scientific classification
- Kingdom: Animalia
- Phylum: Arthropoda
- Subphylum: Myriapoda
- Class: Diplopoda
- Order: Polydesmida
- Family: Xystodesmidae
- Subfamily: Xystodesminae
- Tribe: Sigmocheirini; Causey, 1955
- Genus: Sigmocheir; Chamberlin, 1951

Type species
- Sigmocheir calaveras Chamberlin, 1951

Synonyms
- Tuolumnia Chamberlin, 1953

= Sigmocheir =

Genus of millipede

Sigmocheir is a genus of millipede in family Xystodesmidae. The species of this genus are endemic to California where they are found in foothills of the Sierra Nevada mountains. Individuals of the genus can be found from Placer County, south to the northern portion of Tulare County.

== Description ==
The genus is quite unique in appearance amongst the West Coast Xystodesmids. All three species in the genus have a similar color pattern with three lemon yellow spots on each segment (the paranota on either side plus a slightly wider central spot). The paranota arise high on the segments giving the millipedes a rather flat appearance.

== History ==
The history of the genus naming is somewhat complex. The genus was erected in 1951 by R.V. Chamberlin based on a sample collected George Moore in Crystal-Stanislaus Cave in 1950. In 1941 Chamberlin had previously described another species that later would be moved to Sigmocheir as Paimokia maculifer based on a single female individual. In 1953 Chamberlin wrote two papers describing additional samples from Crystal Palace cave. In the first paper he described the species as Sigmocheir dohenyi while in the second he seemingly described the same individual (based on sampling date given) along with others as Tuolumnia dahenyi. This second citation created the synonym for the genus and confusion in later publications. The genus was finally resolved with P. maculifer being moved to Sigmocheir and a third species, Sigmocheir furcata, being added in 1995 by Rowland M Shelley.

== Taxonomy ==
Sigmocheir contains the following species:

- Sigmocheir maculifer
- Sigmocheir calaveras
- Sigmocheir furcata
