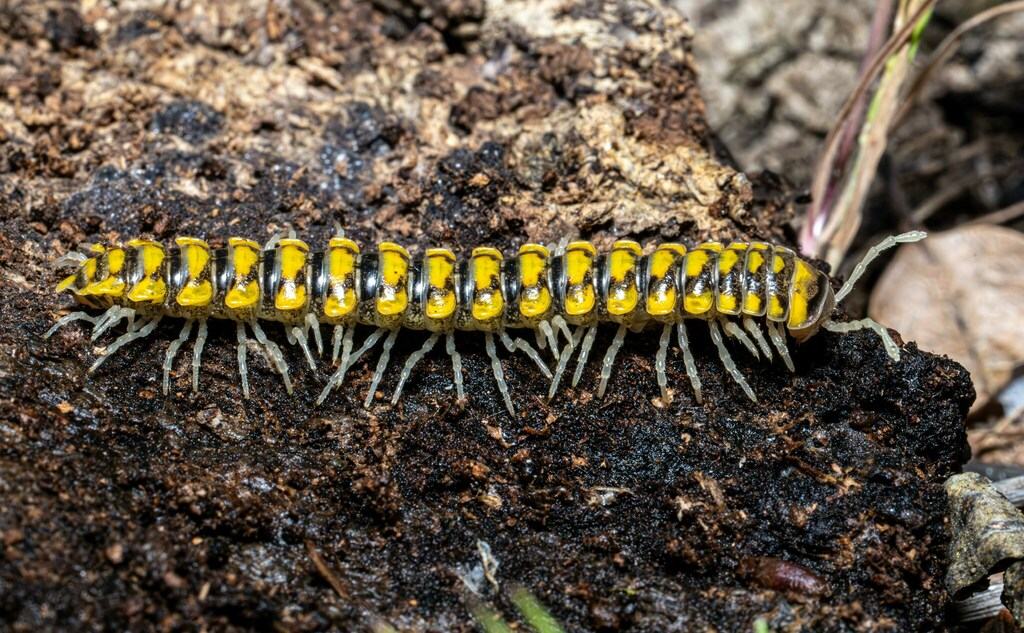

Scientific classification
- Kingdom: Animalia
- Phylum: Arthropoda
- Subphylum: Myriapoda
- Class: Diplopoda
- Order: Polydesmida
- Family: Xystodesmidae
- Genus: Sigmocheir
- Species: S. furcata

Binomial name
- Sigmocheir furcata Shelley, 1995

= Sigmocheir furcata =

Species of millipede

Sigmocheir furcata is a species of millipede in the family Xystodesmidae. The species in endemic to California and found in the foothills of the Sierra Nevada mountains.

== Description ==
Sigmocheir furcata was described by Rowland M. Shelley in 1995 based on samples collected by R. E. Graham from Williams cave in Calaveras County in 1963. As with other members of the genus, S. furcata has a distinctive trimaculate pattern with an ovoid mid-tergite yellow spot and yellow paranota. Compared to other members of the genus the paranota on S. furcata arise slightly lower on the tergites giving the millipedes a slightly more domed appearance. The species has light colored/white legs and antennae, and the antennae are rather long, reaching back to the third tergite.

== Range ==
This species is the northern most representative of the genus being found in the foothills of the Sierra Nevada mountains to the north and south east of Sacramento. Individuals of the genus have been found in Placer, El Dorado, Amador, Calaveras, and Sacramento, counties.
