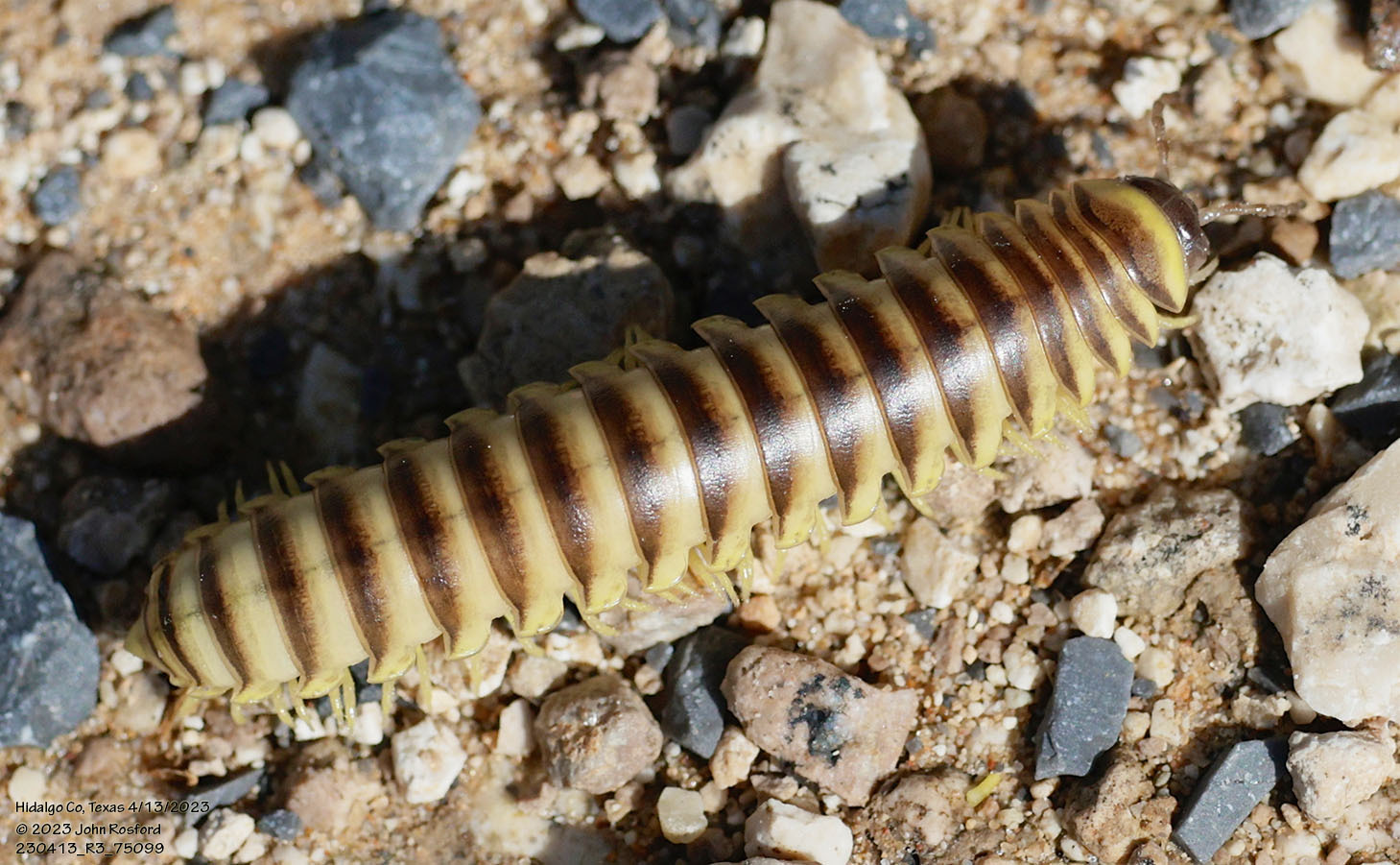
- Rhysodesmus texicolens, Texas

Scientific classification
- Kingdom: Animalia
- Phylum: Arthropoda
- Subphylum: Myriapoda
- Class: Diplopoda
- Order: Polydesmida
- Family: Xystodesmidae
- Genus: Rhysodesmus
- Species: R. texicolens

Binomial name
- Rhysodesmus texicolens (Chamberlin, 1938)

= Rhysodesmus texicolens =

Species of millipede

Rhysodesmus texicolens is a species of flat-backed millipede in the family Xystodesmidae. It is found in North America.
