= Sigmoria latior =

Scientific classification
- Kingdom: Animalia
- Phylum: Arthropoda
- Subphylum: Myriapoda
- Class: Diplopoda
- Order: Polydesmida
- Family: Xystodesmidae
- Genus: Sigmoria
- Species: S. latior

Binomial name
- Sigmoria latior (Brölemann, 1900)

Species of millipede

Sigmoria latior is a species of flat-backed millipede in the family Xystodesmidae. It is found in North America.

== Subspecies ==
These four subspecies belong to the species Sigmoria latior:

- Sigmoria latior hoffmani Shelley, 1976
- Sigmoria latior latior (Brolemann, 1900)
- Sigmoria latior mariona Chamberlin, 1939
- Sigmoria latior munda Chamberlin, 1939
