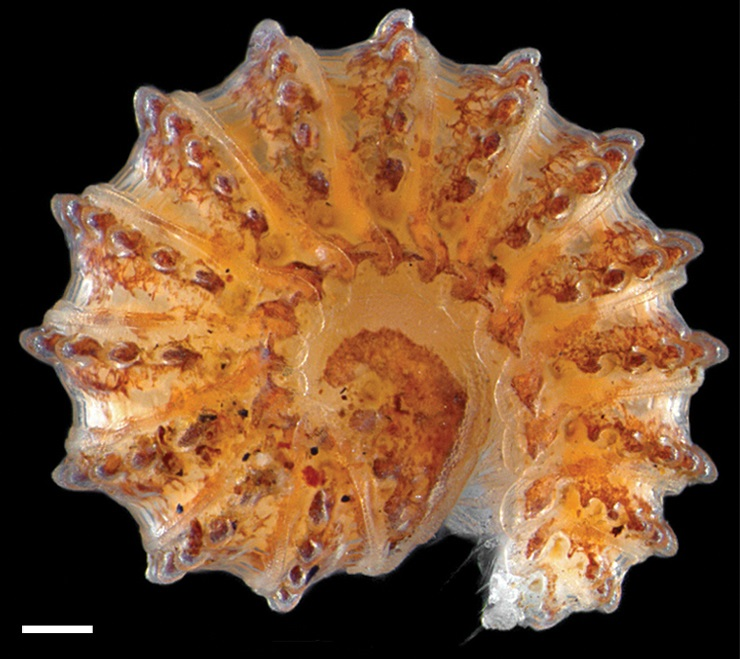
- Ammodesmus granum

Scientific classification
- Kingdom: Animalia
- Phylum: Arthropoda
- Subphylum: Myriapoda
- Class: Diplopoda
- Order: Polydesmida
- Suborder: Polydesmidea
- Infraorder: Oniscodesmoides
- Superfamily: Pyrgodesmoidea
- Family: Ammodesmidae; Cook, 1896

Genera
- Ammodesmus; Elassystremma
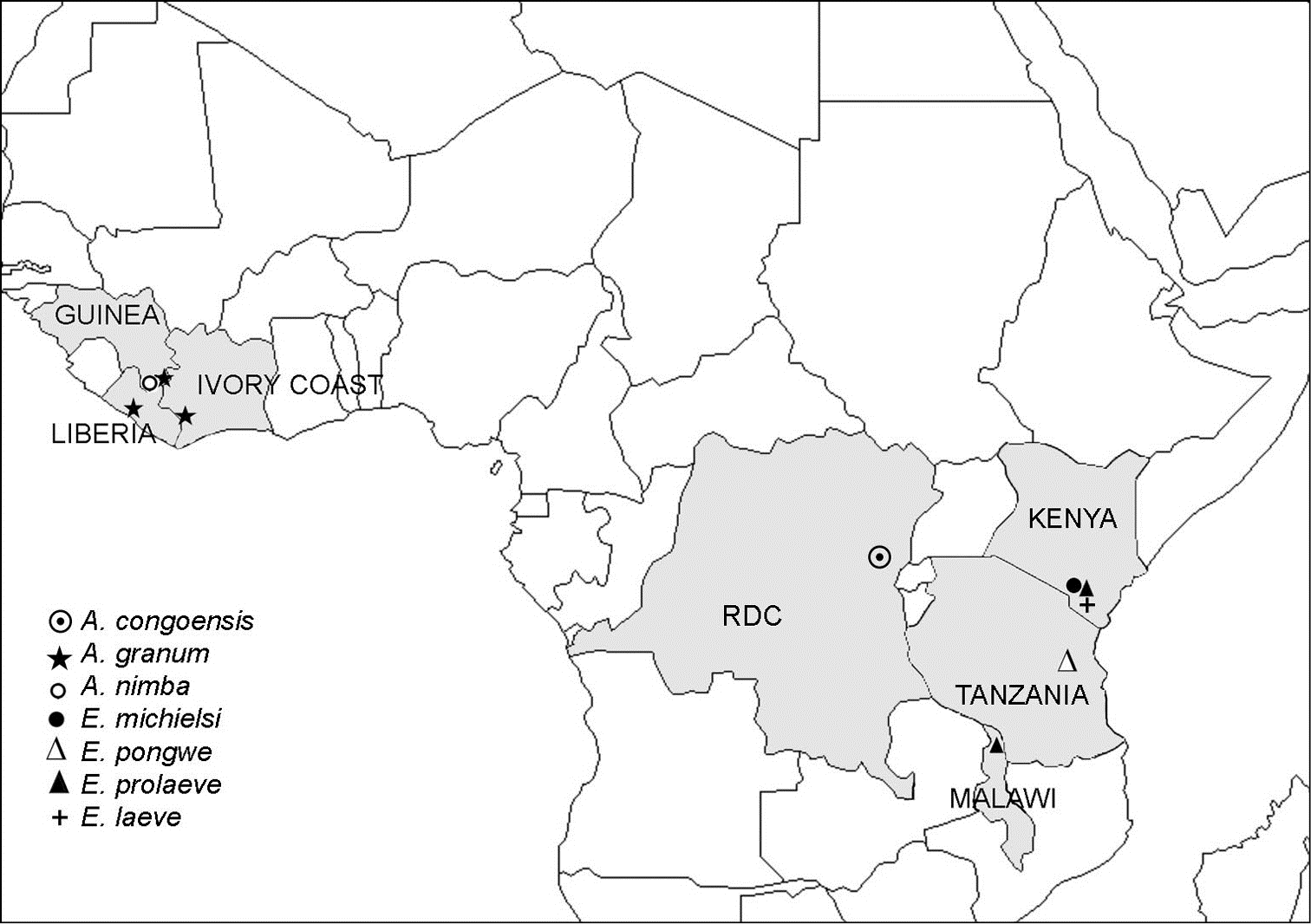
- Distribution of the Ammodesmidae

= Ammodesmidae =

Family of millipedes

Ammodesmidae is a family of small millipedes endemic to Africa, containing seven species in two genera. Ammodesmids range from 1.4 to 5.0 mm (0.055 to 0.197 in) long with 18 or 19 body segments (including the telson) in both sexes, and are capable of rolling into a tight sphere.

Ammodesmidae contains two genera: Ammodesmus, with three species known from West Africa and the Democratic Republic of Congo, and Elassystremma, with four species known from East Africa. Adult Ammodesmus range from 1.4–2 mm in length, and adult males possess a last pair of legs strongly modified: bearing long whip-like bristles (setae) and with vestigial claws. Males of the genus Elassystremma lack the modified rear legs, and are larger, from 3.3–5 mm.

== Ammodesmus ==
The genus Ammodesmus was named in 1896 by Orator F. Cook in the description of Ammodesmus granum. The genus was thought restricted to West Africa (Guinea, Liberia and Ivory Coast) until the 2015 description of A. congoensis from the Democratic Republic of the Congo. A. congoensis differs from the other two species in lacking ozopores (defensive glands), and has conspicuous sexual dimorphism, with females bearing sparse, long setae. A. congoensis and A. granum are notable as the only two species in the order Polydesmida in which each sex can have 18 or 19 segments; intraspecific variation in segment number within sex is rare in this order.

- Ammodesmus congoensis VandenSpiegel & Golovatch, 2015
- Ammodesmus granum Cook, 1896
- Ammodesmus nimba VandenSpiegel & Golovatch, 2012
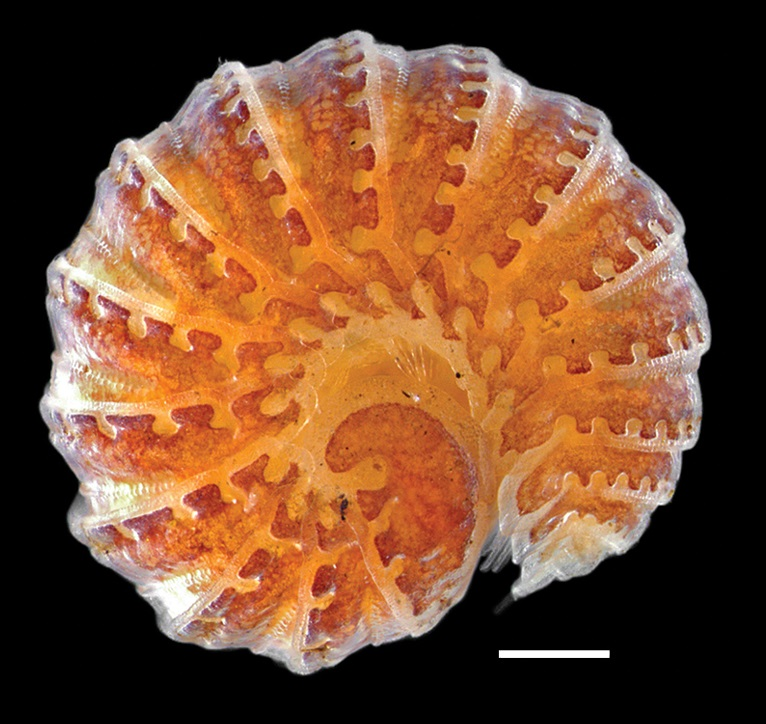
Ammodesmus nimba

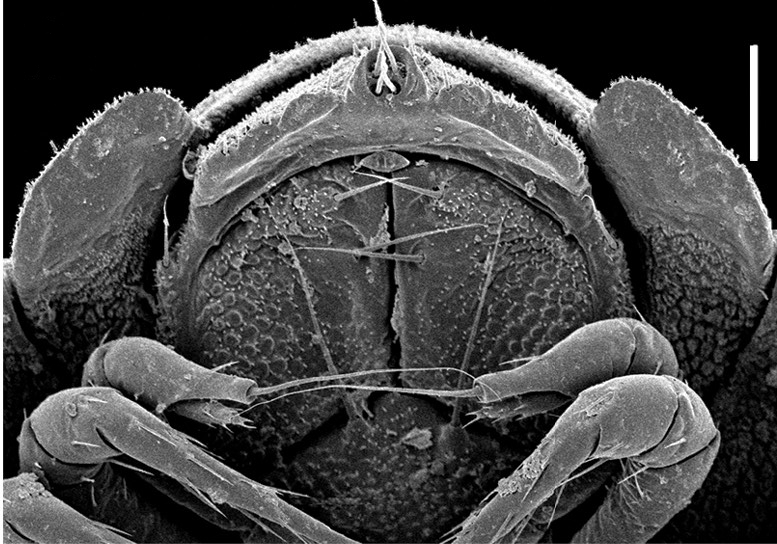
Modified hind legs of Ammodesmus nimba

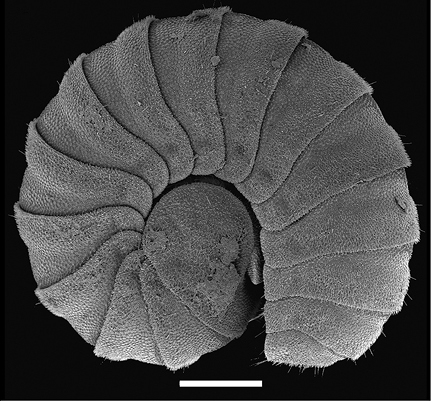
Ammodesmus congoensis male

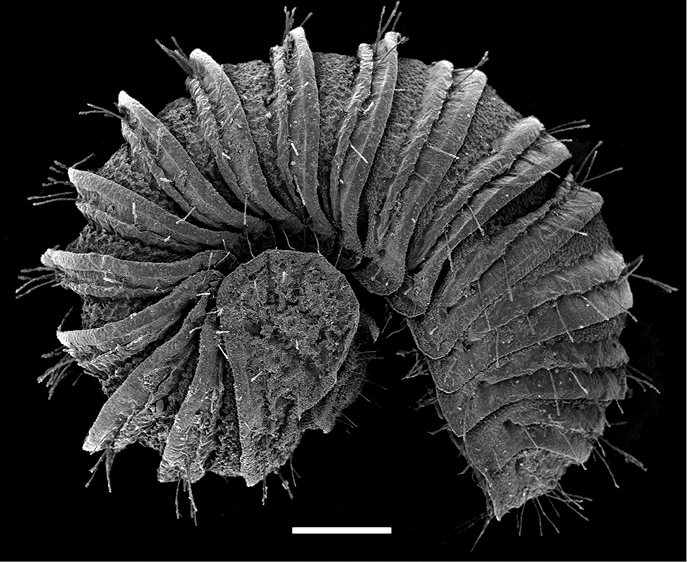
Ammodesmus congoensis female

== Elassystremma ==
The genus Elassystremma was established in 1981 by Richard L. Hoffman and K. M. Howell. Four species are known, occurring in Kenya, Tanzania, and Malawi.

- Elassystremma laeve VandenSpiegel & Golovatch, 2004
- Elassystremma michielsi VandenSpiegel & Golovatch, 2004
- Elassystremma pongwe Hoffman & Howell, 1981
- Elassystremma prolaeve VandenSpiegel & Golovatch, 2004
