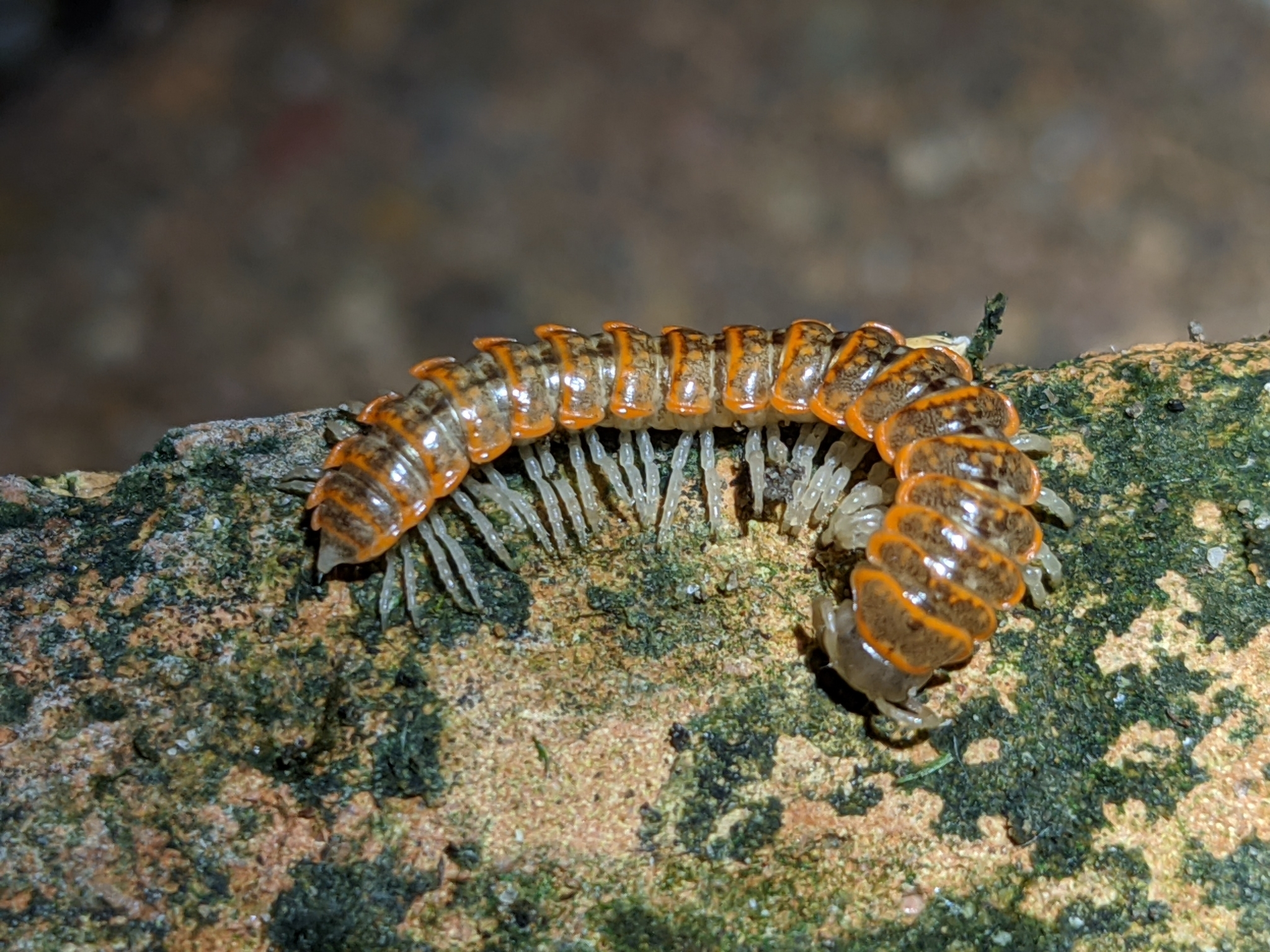

Scientific classification
- Kingdom: Animalia
- Phylum: Arthropoda
- Subphylum: Myriapoda
- Class: Diplopoda
- Order: Polydesmida
- Family: Eurymerodesmidae
- Genus: Eurymerodesmus; Brolemann, 1900

= Eurymerodesmus =

Genus of millipedes

Eurymerodesmus is a genus of flat-backed millipedes in the family Eurymerodesmidae. There are more than 30 described species in Eurymerodesmus.

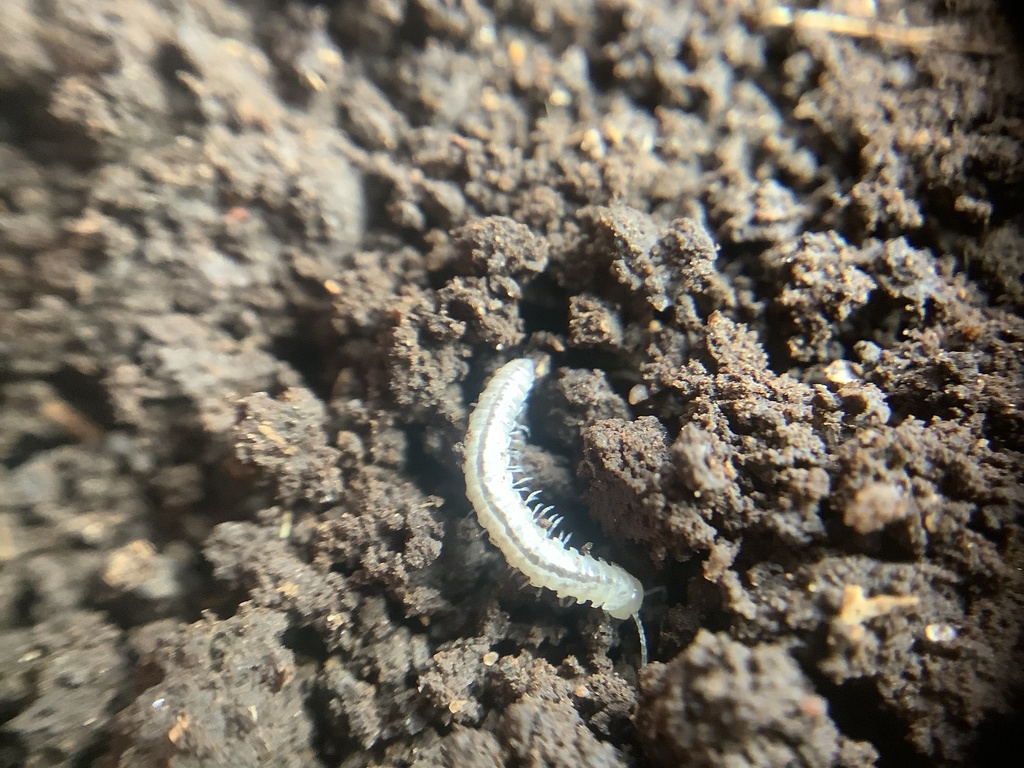
A larva of a Eurymerodesmus species found in Austin, Texas

== Species ==
These 39 species belong to the genus Eurymerodesmus:

- Eurymerodesmus amplus Causey, 1952
- Eurymerodesmus angularis Causey, 1951
- Eurymerodesmus bentonus Causey, 1950
- Eurymerodesmus birdi Chamberlin, 1931
- Eurymerodesmus booneus Chamberlin, 1942
- Eurymerodesmus caesariatus Shelley, 1989
- Eurymerodesmus christianus Chamberlin, 1946
- Eurymerodesmus clavatus Shelley, 1989
- Eurymerodesmus compressus Causey, 1952
- Eurymerodesmus crassatus Shelley, 1989
- Eurymerodesmus creolus Chamberlin, 1942
- Eurymerodesmus dactylocyphus Shelley, 1990
- Eurymerodesmus dactylophorus Shelley, 1989
- Eurymerodesmus digitatus Loomis, 1976
- Eurymerodesmus dubius Chamberlin, 1943
- Eurymerodesmus elevatus Shelley, 1989
- Eurymerodesmus goodi Causey, 1952
- Eurymerodesmus hamatilis Loomis, 1969
- Eurymerodesmus hispidipes (Wood, 1864)
- Eurymerodesmus impurus (Wood, 1867)
- Eurymerodesmus louisianae Chamberlin, 1942
- Eurymerodesmus melacis Chamberlin & Mulaik, 1941
- Eurymerodesmus minimus Loomis, 1943
- Eurymerodesmus mundus Chamberlin, 1931
- Eurymerodesmus newtonus Chamberlin, 1942
- Eurymerodesmus oliphantus Chamberlin, 1942
- Eurymerodesmus pariocus (Chamberlin, 1942)
- Eurymerodesmus paroicus (Chamberlin, 1942)
- Eurymerodesmus planus Causey, 1950
- Eurymerodesmus plishneri Causey, 1950
- Eurymerodesmus polkensis (Causey, 1952)
- Eurymerodesmus pulaski (Causey, 1950)
- Eurymerodesmus sanbernardiensis Causey, 1952
- Eurymerodesmus schmidti Chamberlin, 1943
- Eurymerodesmus serratus Shelley, 1989
- Eurymerodesmus simplex Chamberlin, 1920
- Eurymerodesmus spectabilis Causey, 1950
- Eurymerodesmus varius (McNeill, 1887)
- Eurymerodesmus wellesleybentoni Causey, 1952
