= Rhachodesmidae =

Scientific classification
- Kingdom: Animalia
- Phylum: Arthropoda
- Subphylum: Myriapoda
- Class: Diplopoda
- Order: Polydesmida
- Suborder: Leptodesmidea
- Family: Rhachodesmidae; Carl, 1903

Family of millipedes

Rhachodesmidae is a family of flat-backed millipedes in the order Polydesmida. There are more than 20 genera and at least 80 described species in Rhachodesmidae.

== Genera ==
These 21 genera belong to the family Rhachodesmidae:

- Aceratophallus Carl, 1902
- Acutangulus Attems, 1898
- Ceuthauxus Chamberlin, 1942
- Chromodesmus Loomis, 1977
- Cornalatus Attems, 1931
- Curodesmus Chamberlin, 1922
- Diuncustoma Shelley, 1997
- Dobrodesmus
- Euphallus Chamberlin, 1953
- Metaphallus Chamberlin, 1952
- Mexidesmus Loomis, 1977
- Neoleptodesmus Carl, 1903
- Pararhachistes Pocock, 1909
- Rhachidomorpha De Saussure, 1860
- Rhachodesmus Cook, 1895
- Sakophallus Chamberlin, 1941
- Strongylodesmus De Saussure, 1859
- Tancitares Chamberlin, 1942
- Teinorhachis Loomis, 1961
- Tiphallus Chamberlin, 1952
- Unculabes Causey, 1971
