= Vaalogonopodidae =

Scientific classification
- Kingdom: Animalia
- Phylum: Arthropoda
- Subphylum: Myriapoda
- Class: Diplopoda
- Order: Polydesmida
- Family: Vaalogonopodidae

Family of millipedes

Vaalogonopodidae is a family of millipedes belonging to the order Polydesmida.

Genera:

- Phygoxerotes Verhoeff, 1939
- Vaalogonopus Verhoeff, 1940
