= Tridontomidae =

Scientific classification
- Kingdom: Animalia
- Phylum: Arthropoda
- Subphylum: Myriapoda
- Class: Diplopoda
- Order: Polydesmida
- Suborder: Leptodesmidea
- Superfamily: Rhachodesmoidea
- Family: Tridontomidae; Loomis & Hoffman, 1962

Genera
- Aenigmopus; Tridontomus

Family of millipedes

Tridontomidae is a small family of millipedes. Its members are endemic to Guatemala. These millipedes range from 22 mm to 28 mm in length and are uniformly grayish in color; their legs and antennae are unusually long and slender. This family includes the remarkable species Aenigmopus alatus, in which adult males feature no gonopods. This millipede is the only species in the infraclass Helminthomorpha without gonopods.

The family is divided into the following genera:

- Aenigmopus Loomis & Hoffman, 1962
- Tridontomus Loomis & Hoffman, 1962
