= Opisotretidae =

Scientific classification
- Domain: Eukaryota
- Kingdom: Animalia
- Phylum: Arthropoda
- Subphylum: Myriapoda
- Class: Diplopoda
- Order: Polydesmida
- Family: Opisotretidae

Family of millipedes

Opisotretidae is a family of millipedes belonging to the order Polydesmida.

Genera:

- Carlotretus Hoffman, 1980
- Corypholophus Attems, 1938
- Martensodesmus Golovatch, 1987
- Nepalotretus Golovatch, 1987
- Opisotretus Attems, 1907
- Opisthoporodesmus Silvestri, 1899
- Retrodesmus Chamberlin, 1945
- Solaenaulus Attems, 1940
