= Oxydesmidae =

Scientific classification
- Kingdom: Animalia
- Phylum: Arthropoda
- Subphylum: Myriapoda
- Class: Diplopoda
- Order: Polydesmida
- Genus: Oxydesmidae

Family of millipedes

Oxydesmidae is a family of millipedes belonging to the order Polydesmida.

== Species ==
Genera:

- Adontodesmus Silvestri, 1897
- Allocotoproctus Hoffman, 1990
- Amurus Attems, 1909
