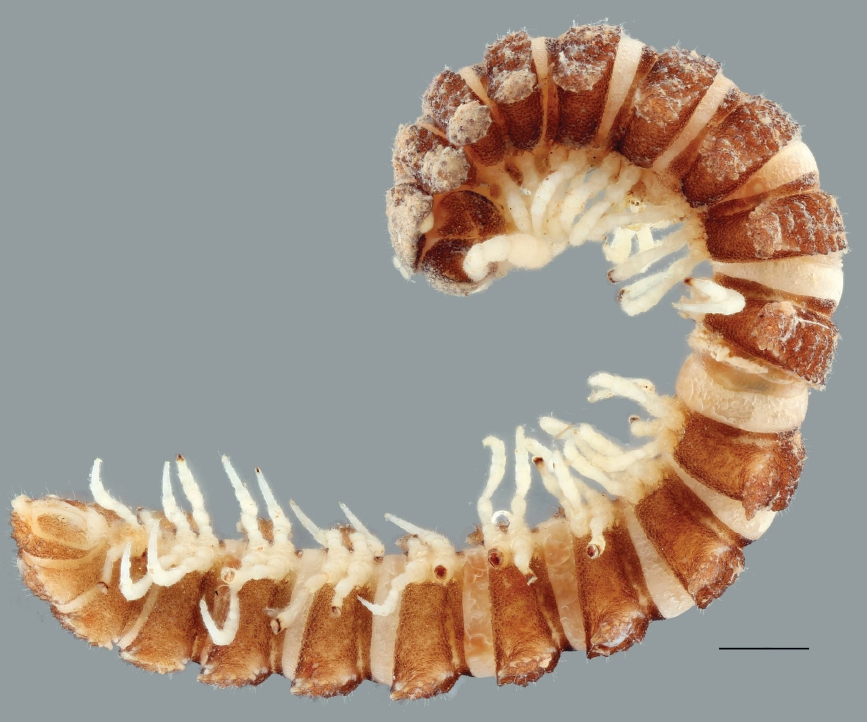

Scientific classification
- Kingdom: Animalia
- Phylum: Arthropoda
- Subphylum: Myriapoda
- Class: Diplopoda
- Order: Polydesmida
- Family: Campodesmidae

= Campodesmidae =

Family of millipedes

Campodesmidae is a family of millipedes belonging to the order Polydesmida.

Genera:

- Afrodesmus Schubart, 1955
- Campodesmoides VandenSpiegel, Golovatch & Nzoko Fiemapong, 2015
- Campodesmus Cook, 1896
- Tropidesmus Cook, 1896
