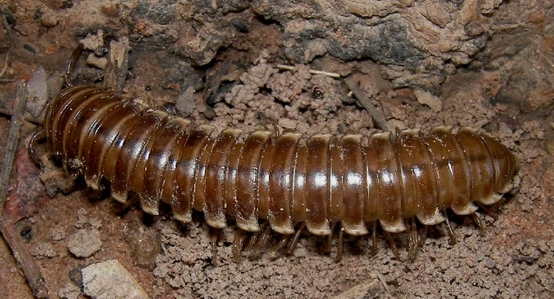
- Tymbodesmus falcatus from Burkina Faso

Scientific classification
- Kingdom: Animalia
- Phylum: Arthropoda
- Subphylum: Myriapoda
- Class: Diplopoda
- Order: Polydesmida
- Suborder: Leptodesmidea
- Superfamily: Xystodesmoidea
- Family: Gomphodesmidae; Cook, 1896

Synonyms
- Eurydesminae Attems, 1898

= Gomphodesmidae =

Family of millipedes

Gomphodesmidae is a family of millipedes in the order Polydesmida, containing around 55 genera and 150 species. The family is native to Africa, and occurs primarily in savanna habitat (open-canopy grasslands) from South Africa north to Senegal and Ethiopia.

== Genera ==
- Aenictogomphus
- Agrophogonus
- Antiphonus
- Astrodesmus
- Auliscodesmus
- Aulodesmus
- Brachytelopus
- Clastrotylus
- Diallagmogon
- Elaphogonus
- Emphysemastix
- Emplectomastix
- Endecaporus
- Erythranassa
- Euporogomphus
- Euryzonus
- Exaesiotylus
- Exochopyge
- Giryama
- Gomphodesmus
- Haplogomphodesmus
- Hapsidodesmus
- Harmodesmus
- Helictogomphus
- Ionidesmus
- Ithynteria
- Kilimagomphus
- Litogonopus
- Marptodesmus
- Masaigomphus
- Merodesmus
- Mitumbagomphus
- Molyrogomphus
- Mychodesmus
- Nematogomphus
- Neodesmus
- Ngurubates
- Ovoidesmus
- Pogoro
- Proagomphus
- Protastrodesmus
- Protyligmagon
- Scaptogonodesmus
- Schizogomphodesmus
- Sigmodesmus
- Sigodesmus
- Sphenodesmus
- Stenotyligma
- Streptelopus
- Tycodesmus
- Tymbodesmus
- Ulodesmus
- Uluguria
- Usambaranus
- Vaalogomphus
- Virungula
