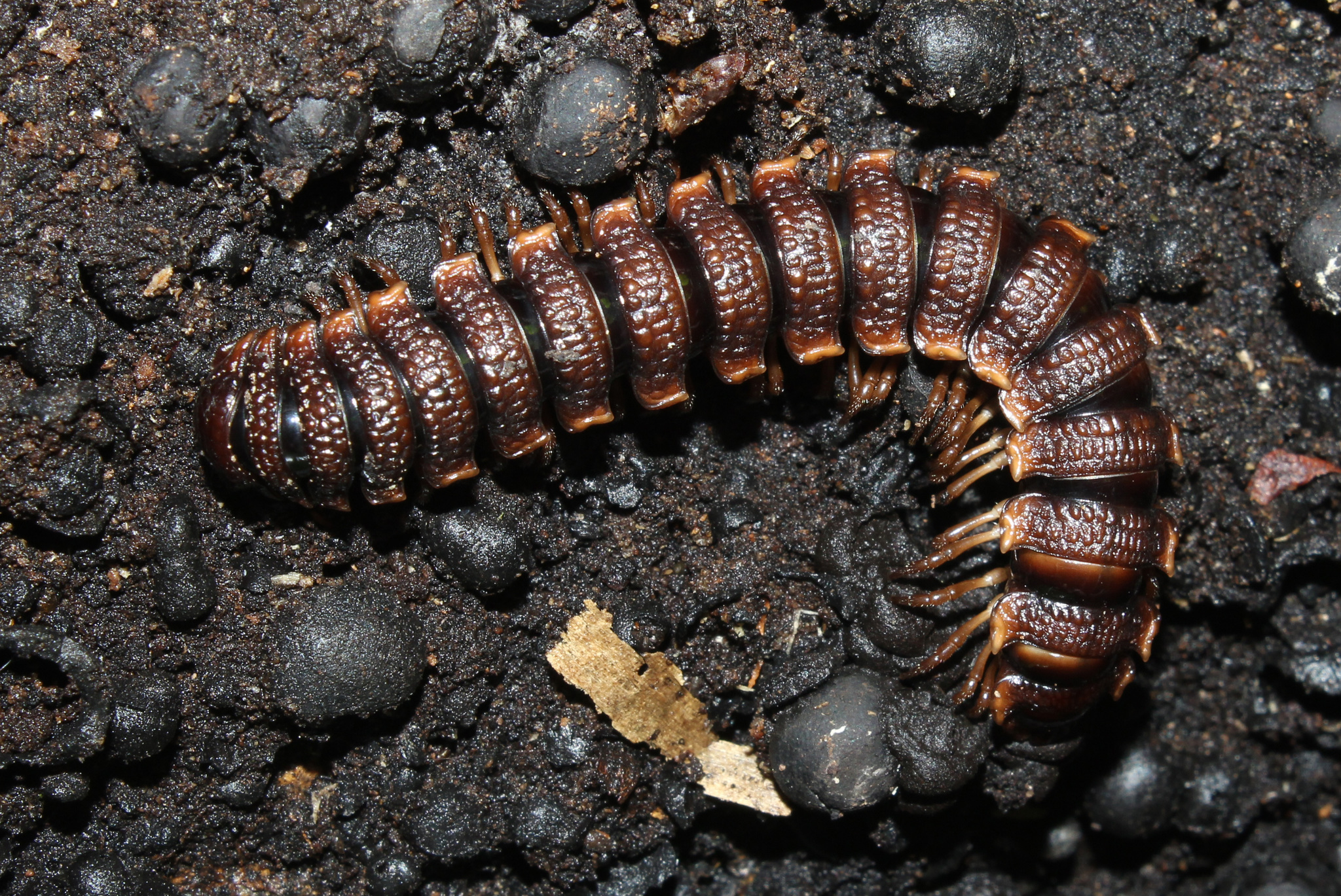
- Amplinus bitumidus

Scientific classification
- Kingdom: Animalia
- Phylum: Arthropoda
- Subphylum: Myriapoda
- Class: Diplopoda
- Order: Polydesmida
- Superfamily: Platyrhacoidea
- Family: Aphelidesmidae; Brölemann, 1916

Genera
- c. 17

= Aphelidesmidae =

Family of millipedes

Aphelidesmidae is a family of polydesmidan millipedes distributed in Central America, the Caribbean and northern South America.

== Description ==
Aphelidesmids are often large and colorful, but many are dorsally dark with yellow tips on the scutes.

== See also ==
- Seminellogon bituberculosus
