= Eurymerodesmidae =

Scientific classification
- Kingdom: Animalia
- Phylum: Arthropoda
- Subphylum: Myriapoda
- Class: Diplopoda
- Order: Polydesmida
- Suborder: Leptodesmidea
- Family: Eurymerodesmidae; Causey, 1951

Family of millipedes

Eurymerodesmidae is a family of flat-backed millipedes in the order Polydesmida. There are at least 2 genera and 30 described species in Eurymerodesmidae.

== Genera ==
- Eurymerodesmus Brolemann, 1900
- Paresmus
