= Cyrtodesmidae =

Scientific classification
- Kingdom: Animalia
- Phylum: Arthropoda
- Subphylum: Myriapoda
- Class: Diplopoda
- Order: Polydesmida
- Superfamily: Pyrgodesmoidea
- Family: Cyrtodesmidae; Cook, 1896

Family of millipedes

Cyrtodesmidae is a family of millipedes. Shear (2011) recognised the group as containing 30 species in 3 genera, probably Agnurodesmus Silvestri, 1910, Cyrtodesmus Gervais in Walckenaer, 1847, and Oncodesmella Kraus, 1959, although other authors recognise different components.

== See also ==
- Cyrtodesmus depressus
- Cyrtodesmus humerosus
- Cyrtodesmus lobatus
