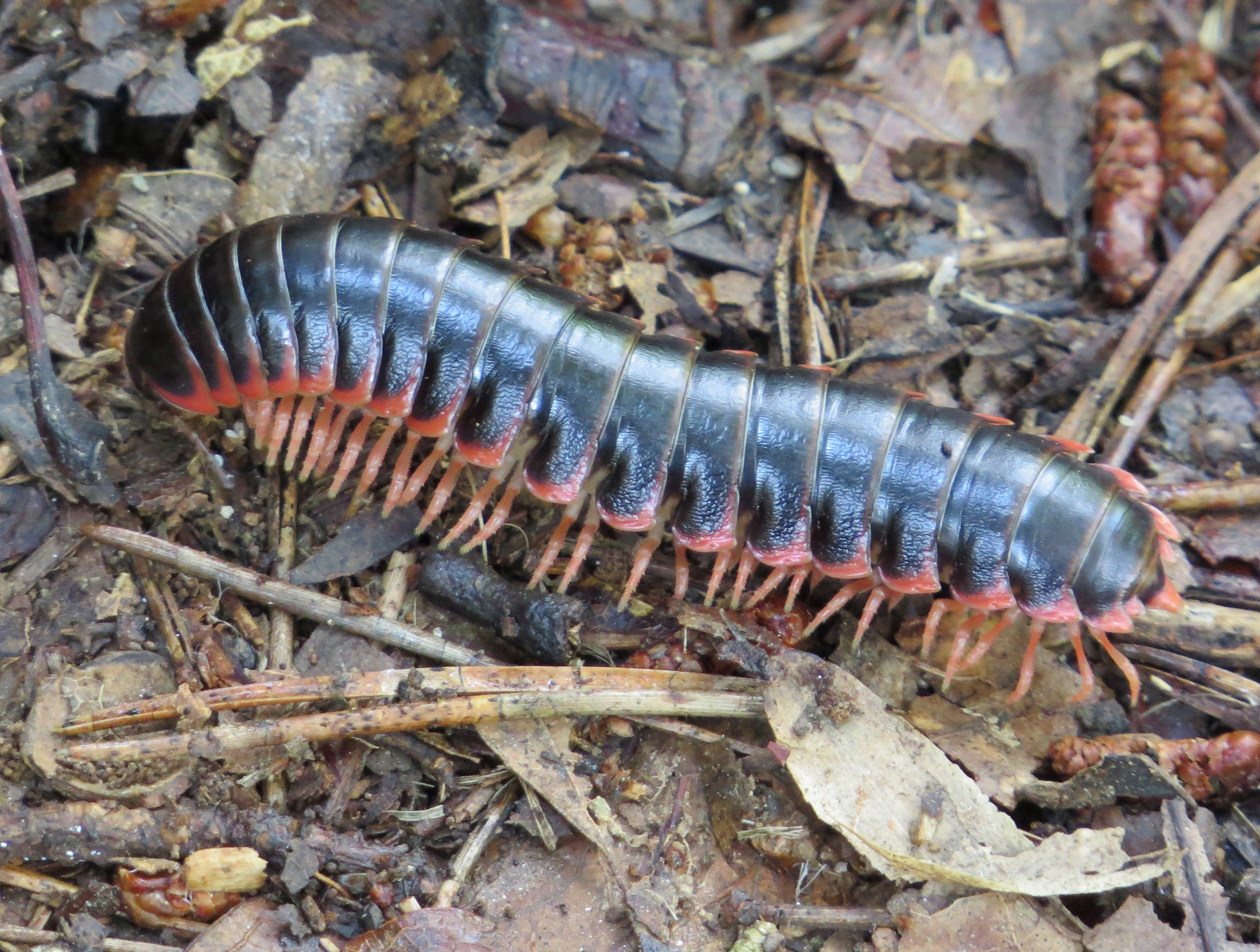
- Sigmoria, South Carolina

Scientific classification
- Kingdom: Animalia
- Phylum: Arthropoda
- Subphylum: Myriapoda
- Class: Diplopoda
- Order: Polydesmida
- Family: Xystodesmidae
- Subfamily: Rhysodesminae
- Tribe: Apheloriini
- Genus: Sigmoria; Chamberlin, 1939

Synonyms
- Brevigonus Shelley, 1980; Cheiropus Loomis, 1944; Cleptoria Chamberlin, 1939; Croatania Shelley, 1977; Dixioria Chamberlin, 1947; Dynoria Chamberlin, 1939; Falloria Hoffman, 1948; Furcillaria Shelley, 1981; Hubroria Keeton, 1960; Lyrranea Hoffman, 1963; Prionogonus Shelley, 1982; Sigiria Chamberlin, 1939; Stelgipus Loomis, 1944

= Sigmoria =

Genus of millipedes

Sigmoria is a genus of flat-backed millipedes in the family Xystodesmidae. There are more than 60 described species in Sigmoria, found in the eastern United States.

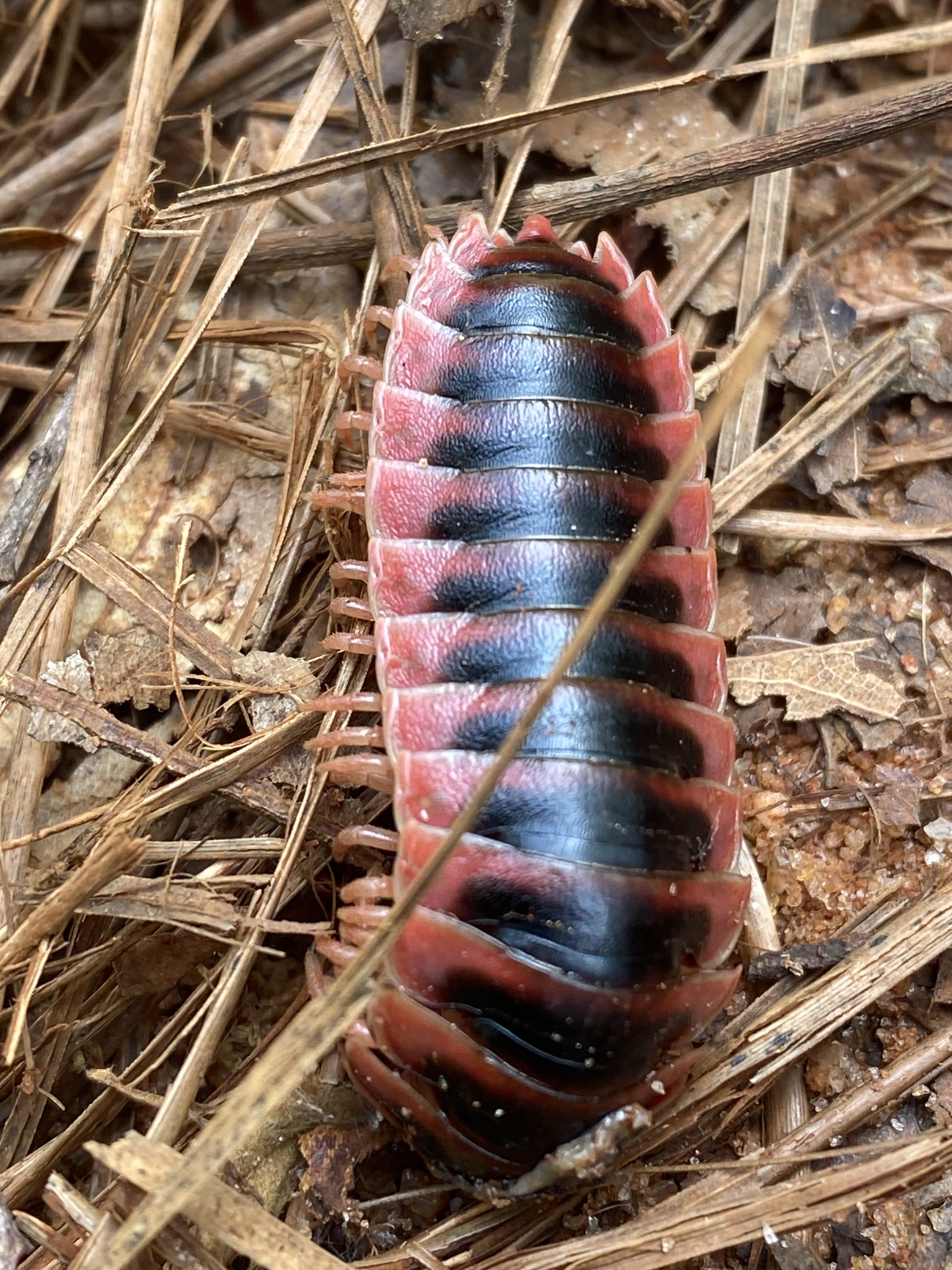
Sigmoria australis, Georgia

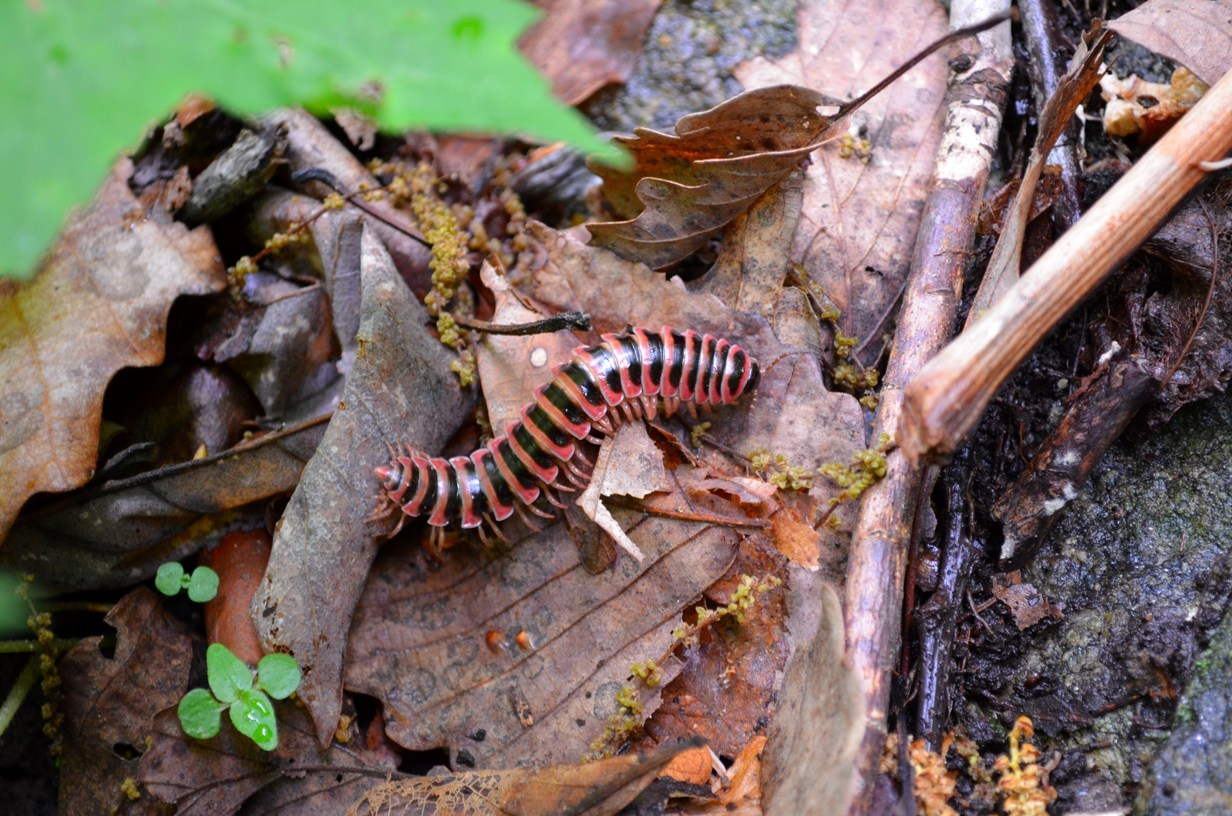
Sigmoria latior munda, North Carolina

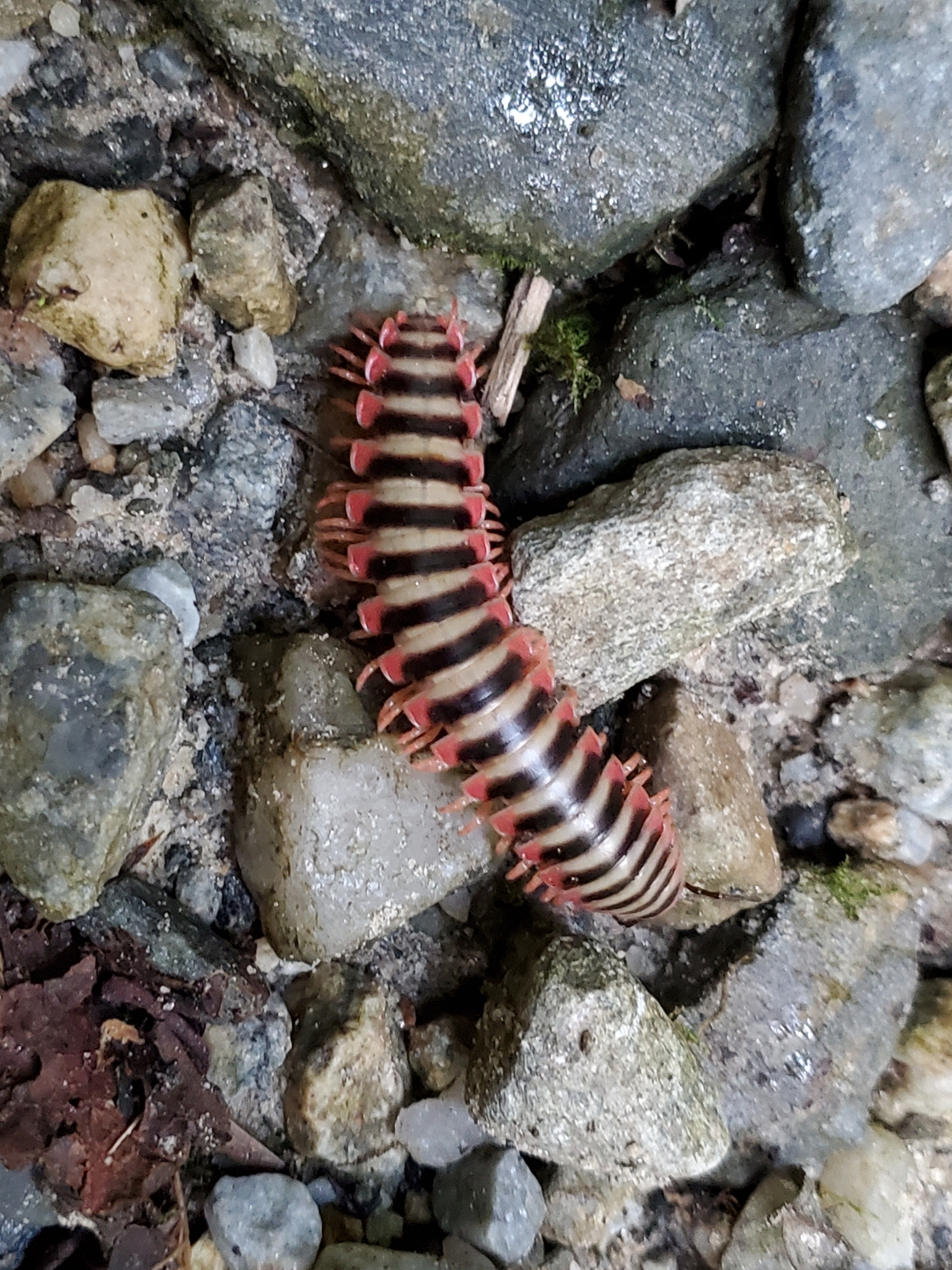
Sigmoria nantahalae, North Carolina

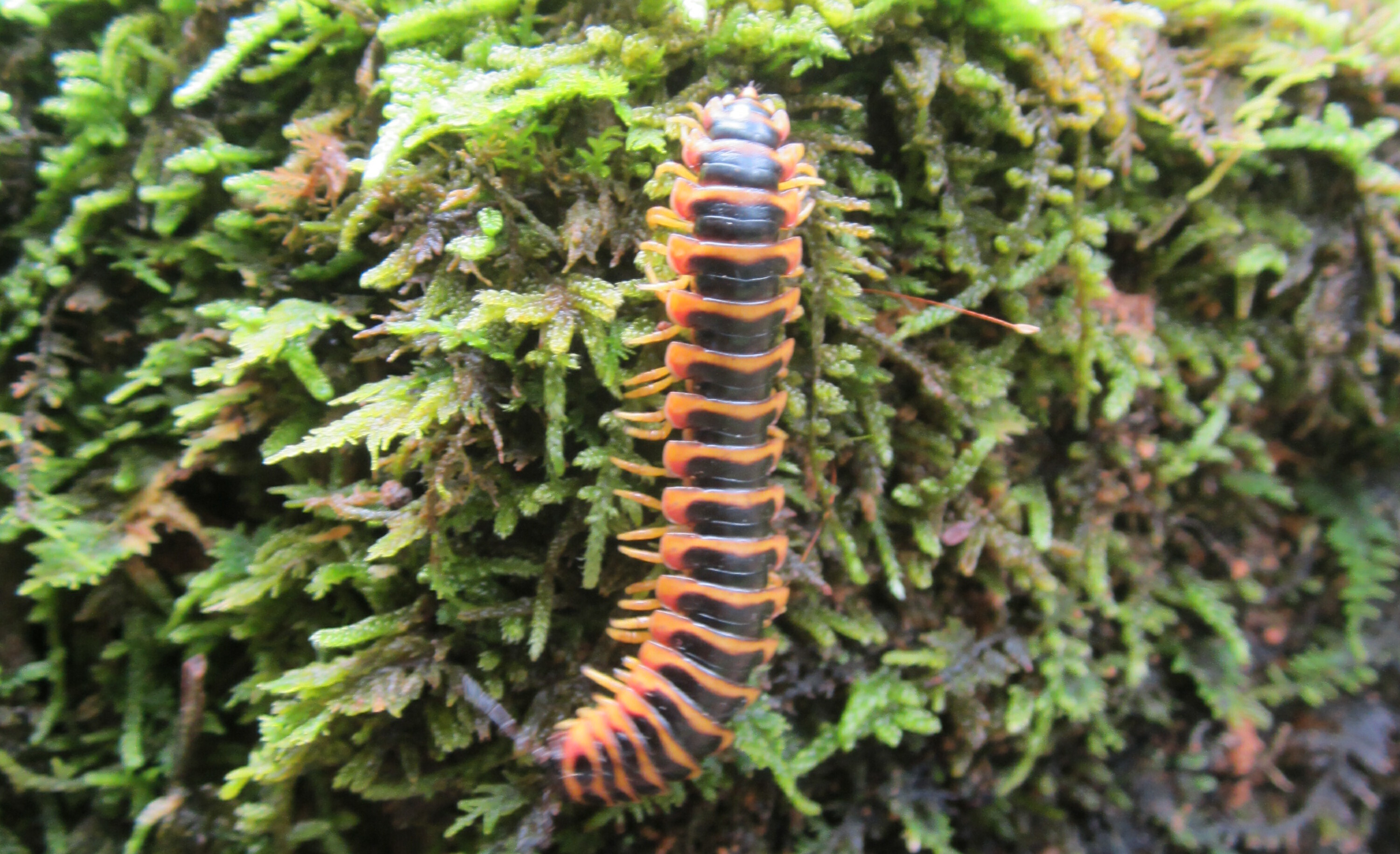
Sigmoria trimaculata, Pennsylvania

== Species ==
These 67 species belong to the genus Sigmoria:

- Sigmoria abbotti (Hoffman, 1967)
- Sigmoria acuminata (Hoffman, 1956)
- Sigmoria aequalis (Shelley, 1981)
- Sigmoria agrestis (Loomis, 1944)
- Sigmoria ainsliei (Chamberlin, 1921)
- Sigmoria angulosa Shelley, 1981
- Sigmoria aphelorioides Shelley, 1986
- Sigmoria arcuata (Shelley, 1982)
- Sigmoria areolata Shelley, 1981
- Sigmoria australis Shelley, 1986
- Sigmoria austrimontis Shelley, 1981
- Sigmoria beameri Marek, Means & Hennen, 2021
- Sigmoria bidens (Causey, 1942)
- Sigmoria bipraesidens (Hoffman, 1967)
- Sigmoria brooksi Hoffman, 1956
- Sigmoria catawba (Shelley, 1977)
- Sigmoria convoluta (Shelley, 1981)
- Sigmoria crassicurvosa Shelley, 1986
- Sigmoria disjuncta Shelley, 1981
- Sigmoria divaricata (Shelley, 1982)
- Sigmoria divergens Chamberlin, 1939
- Sigmoria fumimontis Shelley, 1981
- Sigmoria haerens Shelley, 1982
- Sigmoria hoffmani Shelley, 1976
- Sigmoria houstoni Chamberlin, 1943
- Sigmoria icana (Chamberlin, 1939)
- Sigmoria inornata Shelley, 1986 (Note: Authority/date elsewhere as Shelley, 1981, however it is a later replacement name)
- Sigmoria intermedia (Hoffman, 1948)
- Sigmoria laminata (Shelley, 1981)
- Sigmoria laticurvosa Shelley, 1981
- Sigmoria latior (Brölemann, 1900)
- Sigmoria leucostriata Shelley, 1981
- Sigmoria lyrea Shelley, 1981
- Sigmoria macra (Chamberlin, 1939)
- Sigmoria medialis Chamberlin, 1949
- Sigmoria mimetica (Chamberlin, 1918)
- Sigmoria munda Chamberlin, 1939
- Sigmoria nantahalae Hoffman, 1958
- Sigmoria nigrimontis (Chamberlin, 1947)
- Sigmoria pela (Chamberlin, 1918)
- Sigmoria pendulata Shelley, 1986 (Note: species elsewhere miswritten as "pendula" however that is a subsequent spelling contra to the protonym)
- Sigmoria persica (Hoffman, 1963)
- Sigmoria picapa (Keeton, 1960)
- Sigmoria planca (Loomis, 1944) (Note: species elsewhere miswritten as "plancus" however it is a gender variable adjective, so should be in feminine)
- Sigmoria prolata Shelley, 1986
- Sigmoria quadrata Shelley, 1981
- Sigmoria rileyi (Bollman, 1889)
- Sigmoria robusta Shelley, 1986
- Sigmoria rubromarginata (Bollman, 1887)
- Sigmoria saluda (Shelley, 1977)
- Sigmoria serrata (Shelley, 1984)
- Sigmoria shelfordi (Loomis, 1944)
- Sigmoria sigirioides Shelley, 1981
- Sigmoria simplex Shelley, 1981
- Sigmoria stenogon Chamberlin, 1942
- Sigmoria stenoloba Shelley, 1981
- Sigmoria stibarophalla Shelley, 1981
- Sigmoria thrinax (Shelley, 1982)
- Sigmoria translineata Shelley, 1981
- Sigmoria triangulata Shelley, 1981
- Sigmoria truncata Shelley, 1981
- Sigmoria tuberosa Shelley, 1981
- Sigmoria unicoi Shelley, 1981
- Sigmoria watauga Shelley, 1986
- Sigmoria wrighti (Hoffman, 1956)
- Sigmoria xerophylla Shelley, 1981
- Sigmoria yemassee (Shelley, 1977)
