= Holistophallidae =

Scientific classification
- Kingdom: Animalia
- Phylum: Arthropoda
- Subphylum: Myriapoda
- Class: Diplopoda
- Order: Polydesmida
- Family: Holistophallidae

Family of millipedes

Holistophallidae is a family of millipedes belonging to the order Polydesmida.

Genera:

- Duoporus Cook, 1901
- Elcarmenia Kraus, 1954
- Holistophallus Silvestri, 1909
- Pammicrophallus Pocock, 1909
- Synthodesmus Chamberlin, 1922
- Tunodesmus Chamberlin, 1922
- Zeuctodesmus Pocock, 1909
