= Oniscodesmidae =

Scientific classification
- Domain: Eukaryota
- Kingdom: Animalia
- Phylum: Arthropoda
- Subphylum: Myriapoda
- Class: Diplopoda
- Order: Polydesmida
- Family: Oniscodesmidae

Family of millipedes

Oniscodesmidae is a family of millipedes belonging to the order Polydesmida.

Genera:

- Amphitomeus Verhoeff, 1941
- Barrodesmus Chamberlin, 1940
- Crypturodesmus Silvestri, 1897
- Detodesmus Cook, 1896
- Glomerisphaerium Verhoeff, 1951
- Huanucodesmus
- Katantodesmus Attems, 1898
- Lathrurodesmus Silvestri, 1910
- Ligiodesmus Pocock, 1909
- Lignydesmus Cook, 1896
- Oniscodesmus Gervais & Goudot, 1844
- Perusphaerium Verhoeff, 1951
- Tomeosphaerium Verhoeff, 1941
