= Dorsoporidae =

Scientific classification
- Kingdom: Animalia
- Phylum: Arthropoda
- Subphylum: Myriapoda
- Class: Diplopoda
- Order: Polydesmida
- Genus: Dorsoporidae

Family of millipedes

Dorsoporidae is a family of millipedes belonging to the order Polydesmida.

Genera:

- Dorsoporus Loomis, 1958
- Speleoglomeris
