= Harold F. Loomis =

American botanist and myriapodologist (1896-1976)

- Born: December 23, 1896; Mertensia, New York
- Died: July 5, 1976 (aged 79); Miami, Florida
- Scientific career
- Fields: Botany, myriapodology
- Institutions: U.S. Department of Agriculture
- Author abbrev. (botany): H.F.Loomis

Harold Frederick Loomis (December 23, 1896 – July 5, 1976) was an American botanist and myriapodologist known for his contributions to agronomy, plant pathology, and millipede taxonomy. He worked for the U.S. Department of Agriculture for over four decades, studying diseases of crop plants, and was a colleague of Orator F. Cook. He also made major contributions to the natural history of Central America and the West Indies, naming over 500 species of millipedes in total. He co-described with Cook the leggiest animal on earth: Illacme plenipes, with over 700 legs.

== Biography ==
Harold Loomis was born in the Mertensia neighborhood of Farmington, New York, in 1896. He worked for the U.S. Department of Agriculture from 1914 until his retirement in 1958, some 44 years, and was director of the U.S. Plant Introduction Station at Chapman Field, from 1931 to 1958. He was primarily involved in the production of natural rubber, and also worked on diseases of corn and cotton. He was a charter member of the Fairchild Tropical Botanic Garden, and served many years on its board of directors. He also collected plants and lichen from the American southwest, often contributing specimens along with botanist Robert Hibbs Peebles. in 1939 Loomis described the tropical palm tree Astrocaryum alatum ("Coquillo").

His other area of research was in arthropods. Loomis was an honorary research fellow in entomology at the Smithsonian Institution, and an active research collaborator with the National Museum of Natural History, and Florida State Collection of Arthropods in Gainesville. Early in his career he began working with fellow botanist/entomologist Orator F. Cook. In 1919 Loomis accompanied Cook on an expedition to China to study crops as well as collect millipedes, and in 1928 Loomis and Cook described the millipede with the greatest number of legs known, Illacme plenipes of California. With individuals possessing up to 750 legs (375 pairs), Illacme has more legs than any animal known. Loomis later described another species from Panama with 700 legs.

Loomis's specialty was in the millipedes of Central America and the Caribbean, and over his career he named more than 500 species, at least 127 new genera, 2 new subfamilies, and 9 new families, including Messicobolidae, Tingupidae, and Tridontomidae, with only a few taxa named with co-authors. He produced 64 scientific papers on arthropods and 50 on millipedes. The eminent myriapodologist Richard L. Hoffman wrote of Loomis: "(H)is monographs on the faunas of Hispaniola (1936) and Panama (1964) stand out as oases in a desert of chaotic short descriptive papers. His 1968 checklist of the Mesamerican species is beyond praise for its fundamental reference value." In terms of numbers of species described, Loomis ranks as one of the ten most prolific millipede taxonomists in history.

== Selected works ==
As sole author:

- Loomis, H. F. (1927). Development of flowers and bolls of Pima and Acala cotton in relation to branching. U.S. Dept. of Agriculture
- Loomis, H. F. (1936). The millipeds of Hispaniola, with descriptions of a new family, new genera, and new species. Bull. Mus. Comp. Zool., 80: 3–191, text figs. 1-75, pls. 1- 3
- Loomis, H. F. (1939). "A new palm from Costa Rica, Astrocaryum alatum". J. Wash. Acad. Sci. 29 (4): 141–146.
- Loomis, H. F. (1964). "The millipeds of Panama (Diplopoda)". Fieldiana: Zoology. 47 (1): 1–136, plates 1–13. doi:10.5962/bhl.title.3182.
- Loomis, H. F. (1968). "A checklist of the millipeds of Mexico and Central America". Bull. U.S. Natl. Mus. 266 (266): 1–137. doi:10.5479/si.03629236.266.

With colleagues:

- King, C. J., and H. F. Loomis. (1927). Factors influencing the severity of the crazy-top disorder of cotton. Washington, D.C.: U.S. Dept. of Agriculture.
- Cook, O. F.; Loomis, H. F. (1928). "Millipedes of the order Colobognatha, with descriptions of six new genera and type species, from Arizona and California". Proceedings of the United States National Museum. 72 (18): 1–26, f. 1–6, pls. 1–2. doi:10.5479/si.00963801.72-2714.1. S2CID 54668961.
- King, C. J., and Loomis, H. F. (1929). Further studies of cotton root rot in Arizona with a description of a sclerotium stage of the fungus. U.S. Department of Agriculture.
- King, C. J.; Hope, Claude; Loomis, H. F. (1931). "Studies on sclerotia and mycelial strands of the cotton root-rot fungus". Journal of Agricultural Research. 42 (12): 827–840.

== Eponymous taxa ==
The following is a selection of taxa named after Loomis.

- Loomisiola Hoffman, 1979 (Polydesmida, Chelodesmidae)
- Colactis loomisi Hoffman, 1954 (synonymized with Colactis tiburona), Callipodida, Schizopetalidae
- Nesobolus loomisi Hoffman, 1998 (Spirobolida: Rhinocricidae)
- Prostemmiulus loomisi Mauriès, 1979 (Stemmiulida, Stemmiulidae)
- Tridontomus loomisi Shear, 1977 (Polydesmida, Tridontomidae)
- Troglocambala loomisi Hoffman, 1956 (synonymized with Cambala ochra), Spirostreptida, Cambalidae
- Tylobolus loomisi Keeton, 1966 (Spirobolida, Spirobolidae)
