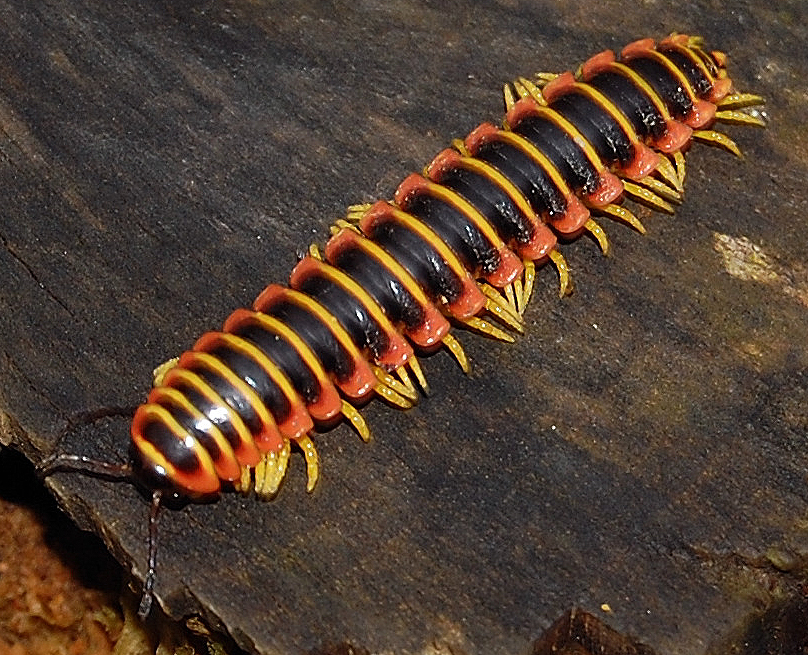
- Apheloria corrugata

Scientific classification
- Kingdom: Animalia
- Phylum: Arthropoda
- Subphylum: Myriapoda
- Class: Diplopoda
- Subclass: Chilognatha
- Infraclass: Helminthomorpha
- Subterclass: Eugnatha
- Superorder: Merocheta; Cook, 1895
- Order: Polydesmida; Leach, 1815

Suborders
- Dalodesmidea; Leptodesmidea Brölemann, 1916; Paradoxosomatidea Daday, 1889; Polydesmidea Leach, 1815

Synonyms
- Proterospermatophora Verhoeff, 1900

= Polydesmida =

Order of millipedes

Polydesmida (from the Greek poly "many" and desmos "bond") is the largest order of millipedes, with more than 5,000 species, including all the millipedes reported to produce hydrogen cyanide (HCN). This order is also the most diverse of the millipede orders in terms of morphology. Millipedes in this order are found in all regions of the world other than Antarctica.

== Description ==
Members of the order Polydesmida are also known as flat-backed millipedes, because on most species, each body segment has wide lateral keels known as paranota. These keels are produced by the posterior half (metazonite) of each body ring behind the collum. Polydesmids have no eyes, and vary in length from 1.4 to 134 mm. Many of the larger species show bright coloration patterns which warn predators of their toxic secretions.

Adults usually have 20 segments, counting the collum as the first ring and the telson as the last ring. Juveniles have from 7 to 19 rings. In species with the usual 20 segments, adult females have 31 pairs of legs, but in adult males, the eighth leg pair (the first leg pair of the 7th ring) is modified into a single pair of gonopods, leaving only 30 pairs of walking legs.

=== Variation ===
Many species deviate from the typical body plan. One striking and unique deviation occurs in adult males of the species Aenigmopus alatus, which retain 31 pairs of walking legs and feature no gonopods. This millipede is the only species in the infraclass Helminthomorpha without gonopods.

The most common deviation, however, is a reduction in the number of segments. Many species have only 19 segments (including the telson) as adults, including those in the genera Brachydesmus, Macrosternodesmus, and Bacillidesmus. In these species, adult females have only 29 pairs of legs, and adult males have only 28 pairs of walking legs. In a few species, including Agenodesmus reticulatus, Deharvengius bedosae, and Doratodesmus hispidus, adults have only 18 segments (including the telson), with a corresponding reduction in the number of leg pairs (27 in the adult female, 26 in the adult male, excluding the gonopods). Still other species exhibit sexual dimorphism in segment number, for example, Prosopodesmus panporus (the usual 20 in adult females, but only 19 in adult males) and Doratodesmus pholeter (19 in adult females; 18 in adult males), with the expected number of leg pairs given the number of segments in each sex. Even more unusual are two species, Ammodesmus congoensis and A. granum, in which adults in each sex can have 18 or 19 segments.

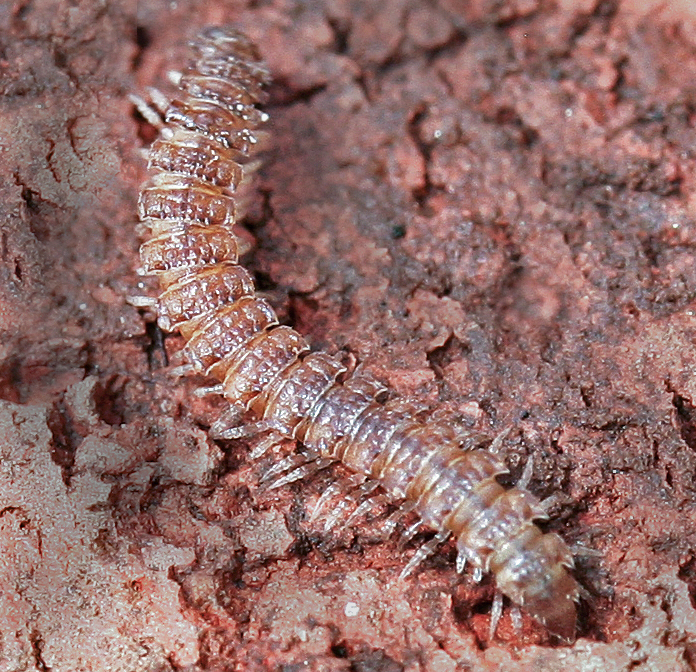
Flat-backed Millipede (Polydesmida)

A few species deviate by having more than the usual number of segments, including those in the cave-dwelling genus Devillea. For example, in the species D. tuberculata, adult females have 22 segments and adult males have 21 (including the telson), with a corresponding increase in the number of leg pairs (35 in adult females and 32 in adult males, excluding the gonopods). Some species in this genus also exhibit variation in segment number within the same sex, for example, in D. subterranea, adult males can have as few as 19 segments or as many as 23 (including the telson). The most extreme outlier in segment number among polydesmids, however, is a cave-dwelling species discovered in Brazil, Dobrodesmus mirabilis, with adult males found to have 40 segments (including the telson).

== Development ==
Polydesmids grow and develop through a series of molts, adding segments until they reach a fixed number in the adult stage, which is usually the same for a given sex in a given species, at which point the molting and the addition of segments and legs stop. This mode of development, known as teloanamorphosis, distinguishes this order from most other orders of millipedes. Millipedes in other orders usually continue to molt as adults, developing through either euanamorphosis or hemianamorphosis.

Millipedes in this order typically develop through a series of eight stages, hatching with only 7 segments (including the telson) and 3 pairs of legs, then molting seven times. These eight stages feature 7, 9, 12, 15, 17, 18, 19, then finally 20 segments. The adults then reproduce and die without another molt. Species with fewer than the usual 20 segments as adults go through the same stages observed in other polydesmids until reaching maturity, which occurs one molt earlier for 19 segments or two molts earlier for 18 segments. Species with more than the usual 20 segments are thought to add these extra segments through additional molts, adding one segment per molt.

== Ecology ==
Polydesmids are very common in leaf litter, where they burrow by levering with the anterior end of the body. These millipedes feed on decaying vegetation. Some species are prey for funnel-web spiders.

== Classification ==
The species of Polydesmida are variously classified into four suborders (names ending in "-idea"), and 29 families, the largest (numerically) including Paradoxosomatidae, Xystodesmidae, and Chelodesmidae.

Dalodesmidea Hoffman, 1980. 2 families

- Dalodesmidae Cook, 1896
- Vaalogonopodidae Verhoeff, 1940

Leptodesmidea Brölemann, 1916. 13 families

- Chelodesmoidea Cook, 1895
  - Chelodesmidae Cook, 1895
- Platyrhacoidea Pocock, 1895
  - Aphelidesmidae Brölemann, 1916
  - Platyrhacidae Pocock, 1895
- Rhachodesmoidea Carl, 1903
  - Rhachodesmidae Carl, 1903
  - Tridontomidae Loomis & Hoffman, 1962
- Sphaeriodesmoidea Humbert & de Saussure, 1869
  - Campodesmidae Cook, 1896
  - Holistophallidae Silvestri, 1909
  - Sphaeriodesmidae Humbert & de Saussure, 1869
- Xystodesmoidea Cook, 1895
  - Eurymerodesmidae Causey, 1951
  - Euryuridae Pocock, 1909
  - Gomphodesmidae Cook, 1896
  - Oxydesmidae Cook, 1895
  - Xystodesmidae Cook, 1895

Paradoxosomatidea Daday, 1889. (Note: synonym: Strongylosomatidea Brölemann, 1916) 1 family

- Paradoxosomatidae Daday, 1889

Polydesmidea Pocock, 1887. 12 families

- Oniscodesmoidea Simonsen, 1990
  - Dorsoporidae Loomis, 1958
  - Oniscodesmidae DeSaussure, 1860
- Pyrgodesmoidea Silvestri, 1896
  - Ammodesmidae Cook, 1896
  - Cyrtodesmidae Cook, 1896
  - Pyrgodesmidae Silvestri, 1896
- Haplodesmoidea Cook, 1895
  - Haplodesmidae Cook, 1895
- Opisotretoidea Hoffman, 1980
  - Opisotretidae Hoffman, 1980
- Polydesmoidea Leach, 1815
  - Cryptodesmidae Karsch, 1880
  - Polydesmidae Leach, 1815
- Trichopolydesmoidea Verhoeff, 1910
  - Fuhrmannodesmidae Brölemann, 1916
  - Macrosternodesmidae Brölemann, 1916
  - Nearctodesmidae Chamberlin & Hoffman, 1958
  - Trichopolydesmidae Verhoeff, 1910
Representative diversity of Polydesmida
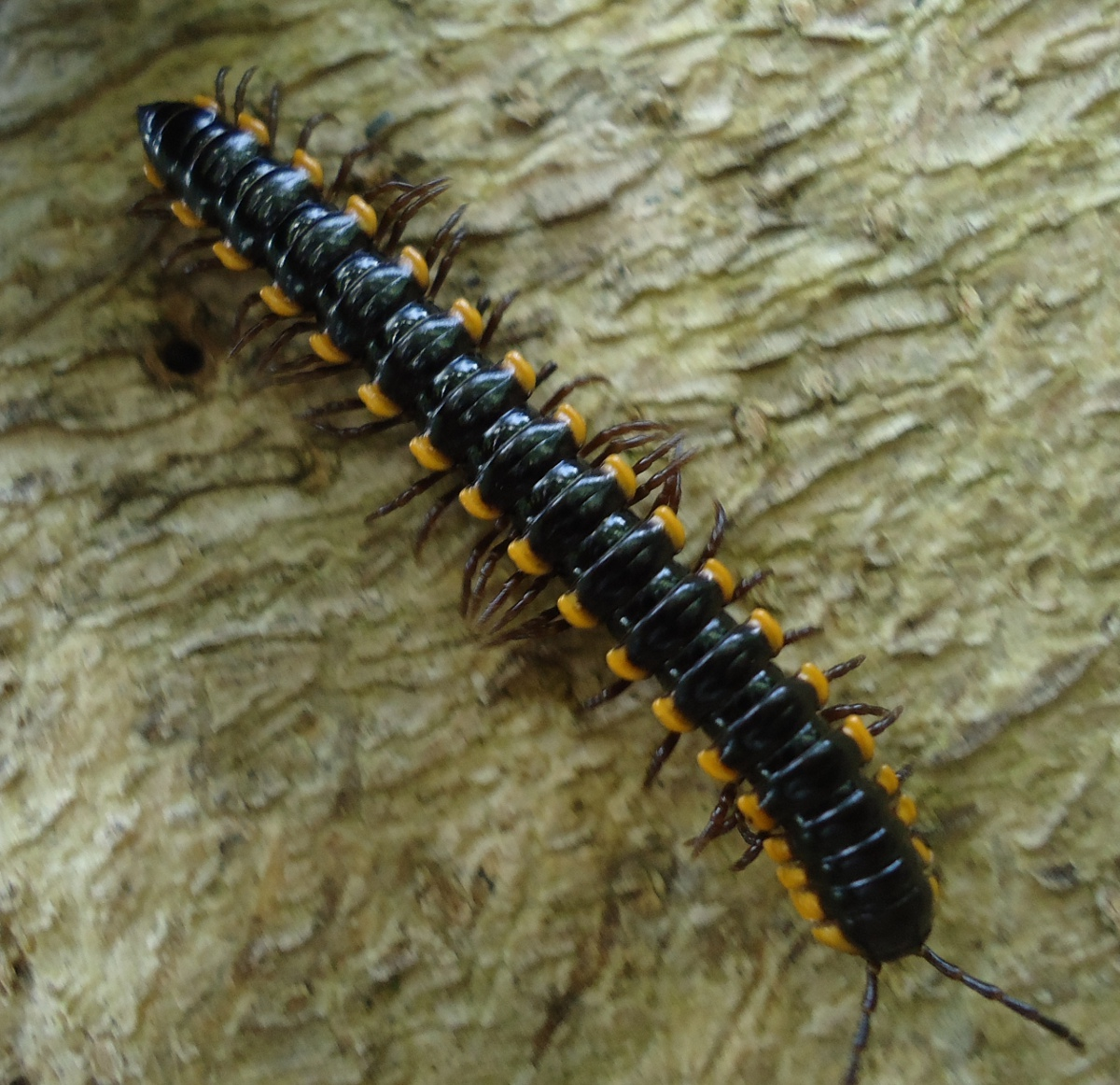
Asiomorpha coarctata (Paradoxosomatidae), an Asian species widely introduced by humans

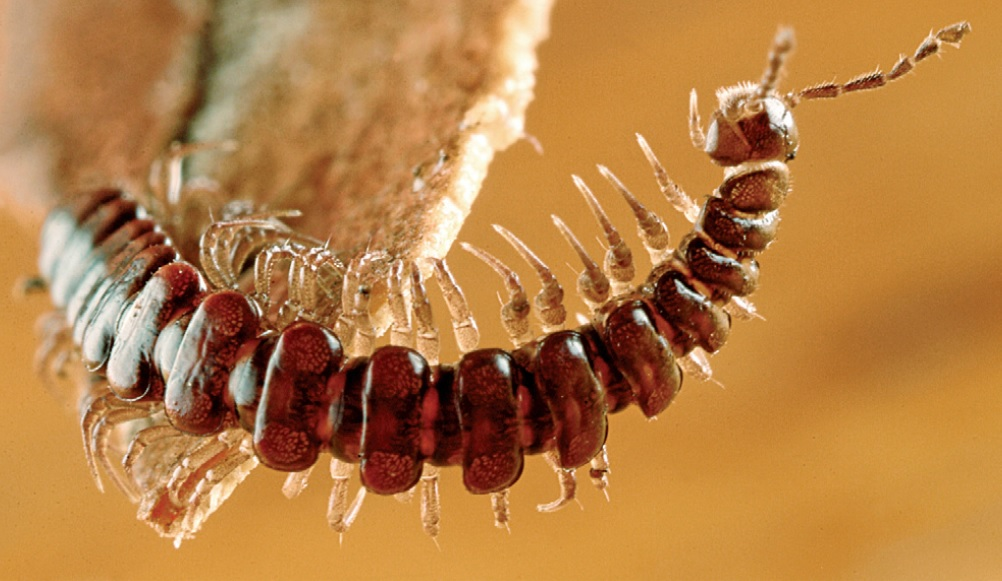
Tasmaniosoma armatum (Dalodesmidae) from Tasmania

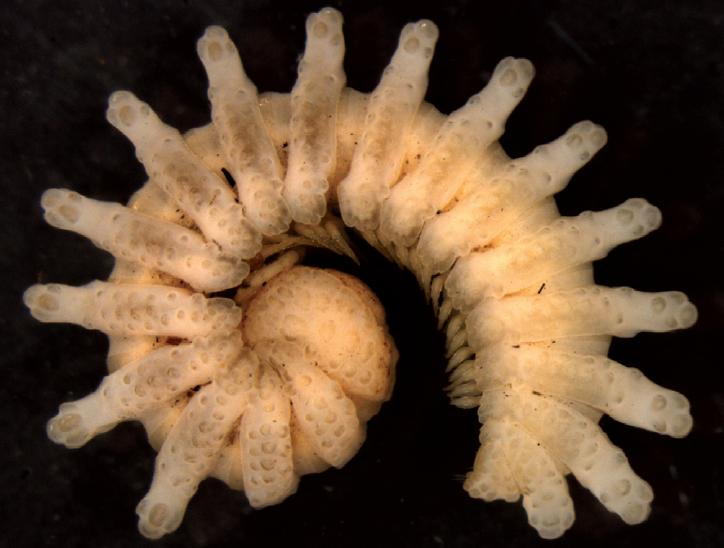
Eutrichodesmus aster (Haplodesmidae) from Vietnam, with unusual mid-dorsal crests

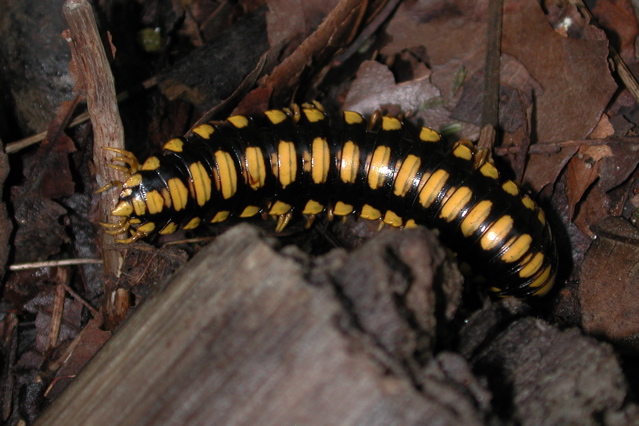
A species of Xystodesmidae from the United States showing aposematic coloration

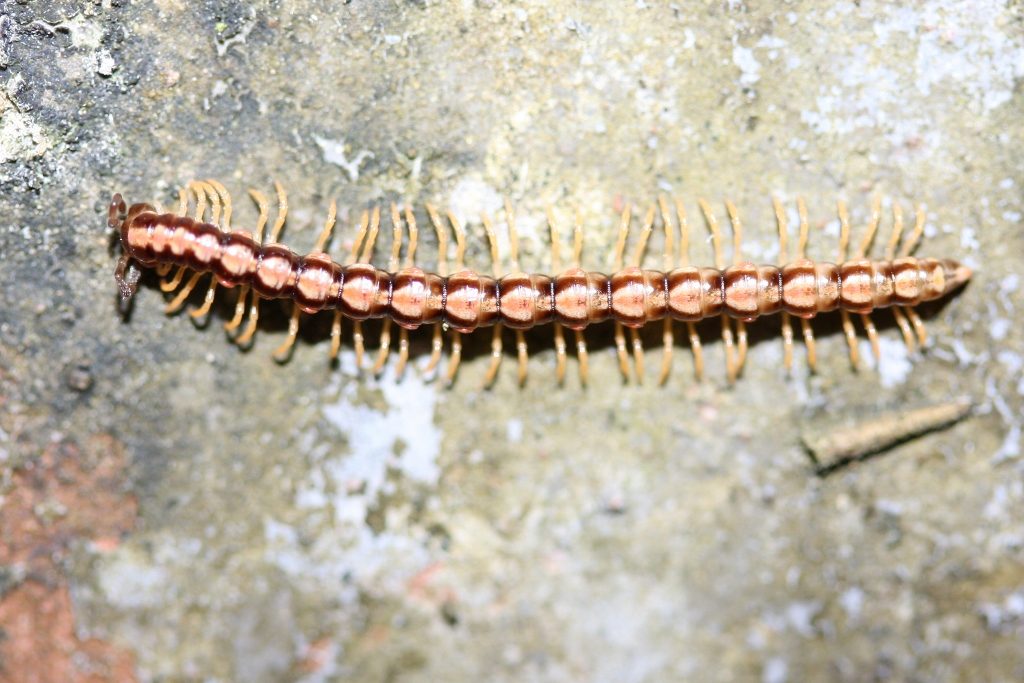
A paradoxosomatid from China, with reduced paranota

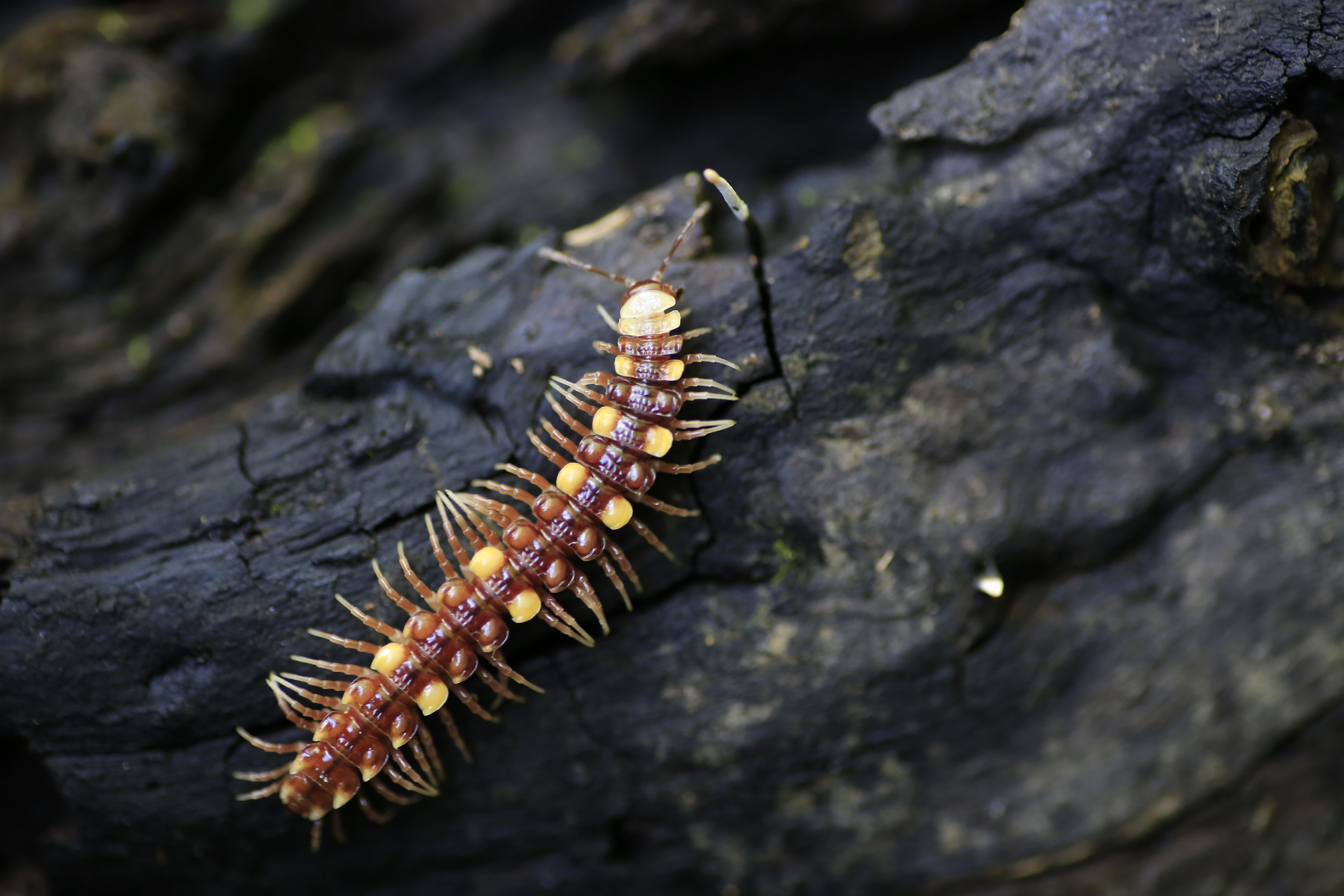
Polydesmus collaris (Polydesmidae) from Europe

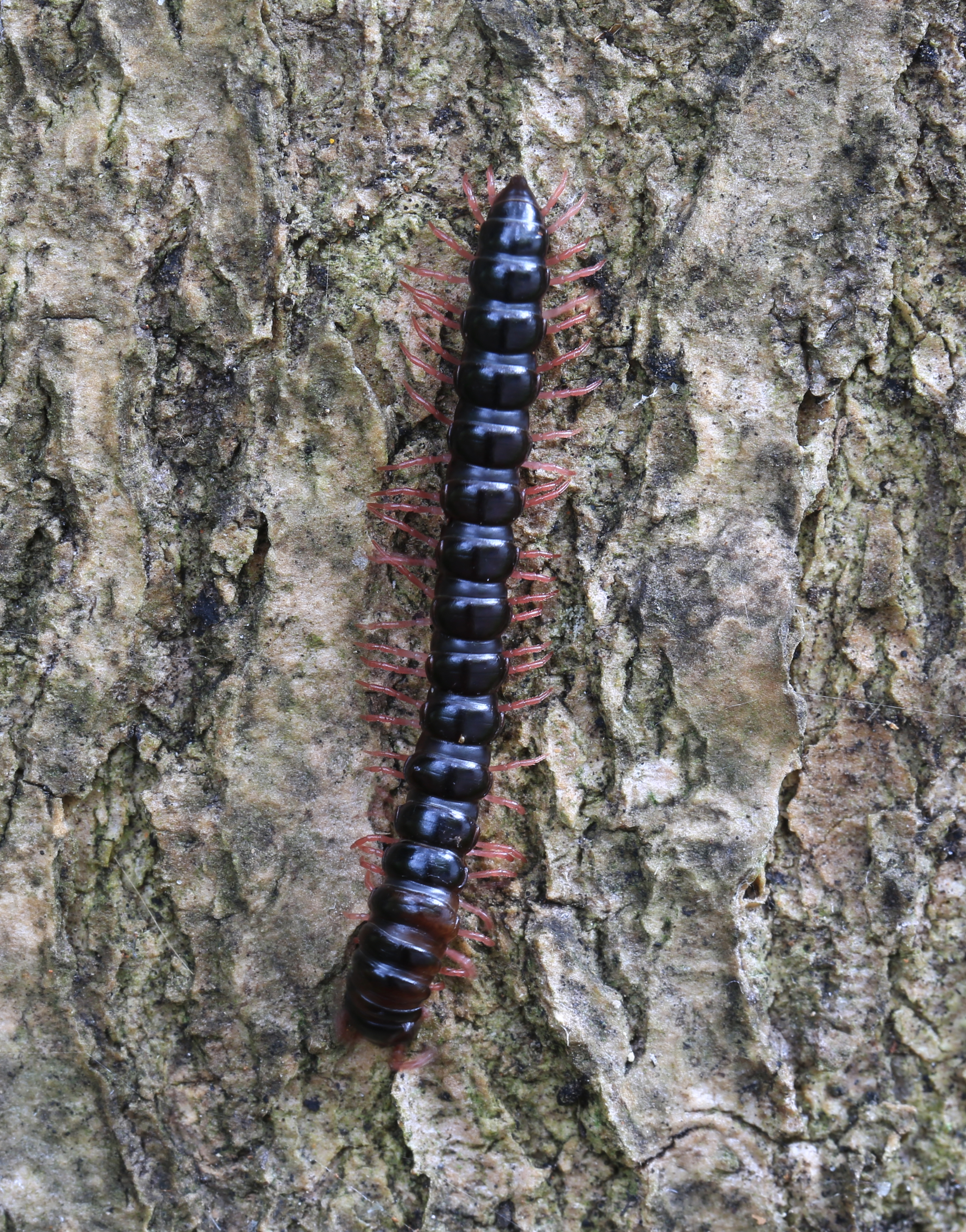
Heterocladosoma bifalcatum (Paradoxosomatidae) from Australia
