= Apheloria whiteheadi =

Scientific classification
- Kingdom: Animalia
- Phylum: Arthropoda
- Subphylum: Myriapoda
- Class: Diplopoda
- Order: Polydesmida
- Family: Xystodesmidae
- Genus: Apheloria
- Species: A. whiteheadi

Binomial name
- Apheloria whiteheadi (Shelley, 1986)

Synonyms
- Sigmoria (Sigiria) whiteheadi Shelley, 1986

Species of millipede

Apheloria whiteheadi is a species of flat-backed millipede in the family Xystodesmidae. Also known as the Laurel Creek millipede, this rare species is found only in a small area in Virginia, which lists this millipede as a threatened species. The geographic range of this species is the smallest of any species of Apheloria and among the smallest in the family Xystodesmidae. Adults of this species are usually around 30 mm in length and 6 mm in width, and the dorsal surface features bright yellow transverse stripes against a black background.

== Discovery ==
This species was first described in 1986 by the American myriapodologist Rowland M. Shelley. He based the original description of this species on a male holotype and three paratypes (two female and one male). All four type specimens were collected by the American zoologist Richard L. Hoffman, who found them along Laurel Creek near the Blue Ridge Parkway in Patrick county in Virginia. Hoffman found the holotype and the female paratypes in 1983 and the male paratype in 1984. All four type specimens are deposited in the Virginia Museum of Natural History in Martinsville.

== Taxonomy and phylogeny ==
Shelley originally described this species under the name Sigmoria (Sigiria) whiteheadi. Although placement in the genus Sigmoria would seem appropriate based on the shape of the gonopods in this species, in 2017, a phylogenetic analysis of the family Xystodesmidae based on molecular data placed this species in the genus Apheloria instead. Based on this surprising evidence, the zoologists Jackson C. Means and Paul E. Marek of the Virginia Polytechnic Institute and State University moved this species to the genus Apheloria. This molecular evidence suggests that the traditional reliance on gonopod morphology may be misleading as a basis for assigning a millipede species to a genus.

A phylogenetic analysis of the genus Apheloria using molecular data finds A. whiteheadi nested among the other five species of Apheloria in a phylogenetic tree of this genus. The three species A. montana, A. polychroma, and A. virginiensis form a sister group for A. whiteheadi, which occupies a more basal branch in this phylogenetic tree. These four species form a sister group for A. corrugata and A. uwharrie, which form another clade on a separate branch of this tree.

== Distribution ==
The species A. whiteheadi is an extreme example of a short-range endemic. This millipede is known only from a small area straddling Patrick and Floyd counties in Virginia. After the original description of this species, efforts to collect more specimens were fruitless for three decades until the rediscovery of this species near its type locality along Laurel Creek. This rediscovery expanded the known range of this species in 2017 to additional sites along a narrow corridor extending only 1 km north and 1 km south of the type locality. This species was known only from this contiguous population along the Blue Ridge Parkway, at an elevation of about 930 meters in the Blue Ridge Mountains, until the discovery of a second population in 2020. This second population was found only 20 km east of the type locality, at an elevation of 436 meters in the Piedmont region of Patrick county.

== Conservation ==
Changes in the environment and habitat fragmentation pose serious threats to extreme short-range endemics such as this species, requiring conservation efforts to preserve their habitats and to protect their populations. Accordingly, the Virginia Department of Wildlife Resources lists this species as "Threatened," that is, "likely to become endangered within the foreseeable future," and the Virginia Department of Conservation and Recreation deems this species to be "Critically Imperiled," that is, at "very high risk of extirpation" in the state of Virginia. Furthermore, NatureServe considers this species "Critically Imperiled," that is, at "very high risk of extinction or elimination."

== Description ==
Although a typical adult of this species is about 30 mm long, some adults can reach nearly 46 mm in length. This species exhibits sexual dimorphism in size, with females generally larger than males. This millipede features yellow legs and a black dorsal surface with a bright yellow stripe on the posterior margin of each tergite. This stripe also extends to the paranota, where it runs along the lateral margins. The collum also features a matching stripe on the anterior margin, creating a continuous yellow stripe around the perimeter of the collum. Like other species of Apheloria and most species in the order Polydesmida, this species features 20 segments in adults, counting the collum as the first and the telson as the last. Accordingly, as in most polydesmid species, adult females of this species feature 31 pairs of legs, whereas adult males feature only 30 leg pairs, excluding leg pair 8, which become a pair of gonopods in adult males.

Although this species could be confused with its close relatives A. corrugata and A. virginiensis, which each have ranges that overlap the area where A. whiteheadi is found, the species A. whiteheadi can be distinguished from all other species of Apheloria based on gonopod morphology. For example, the distal end of the gonopod (acropodite) is curved into a circular shape (O-shaped) in these other species but is instead ρ-shaped in A. whiteheadi. Furthermore, the more proximal part of the gonopod (prefemur) features a short and broad projection (prefemoral process) in A. whiteheadi, whereas this prefemoral process is long and shaped like a scythe in the other species. Moreover, other species of Apheloria feature either a tubercle or an acute angle at the junction of the prefemur and the acropodite, where A. whiteheadi features neither.

== Ecology ==
The species A. whiteheadi is usually found in acidic forests with evergreen thickets of great rhododendron but also found in montane forests with mixed oak trees, dominated by white oak, northern red oak, and chestnut oak. This millipede is found among not only oak but also maple, tulip poplar, witch hazel, pine, beech, paper birch, and sweet gum trees. Adults are typically found beneath fallen leaves from oak, maple, and tulip poplar trees, whereas juveniles are typically found under rhododendron leaves.
