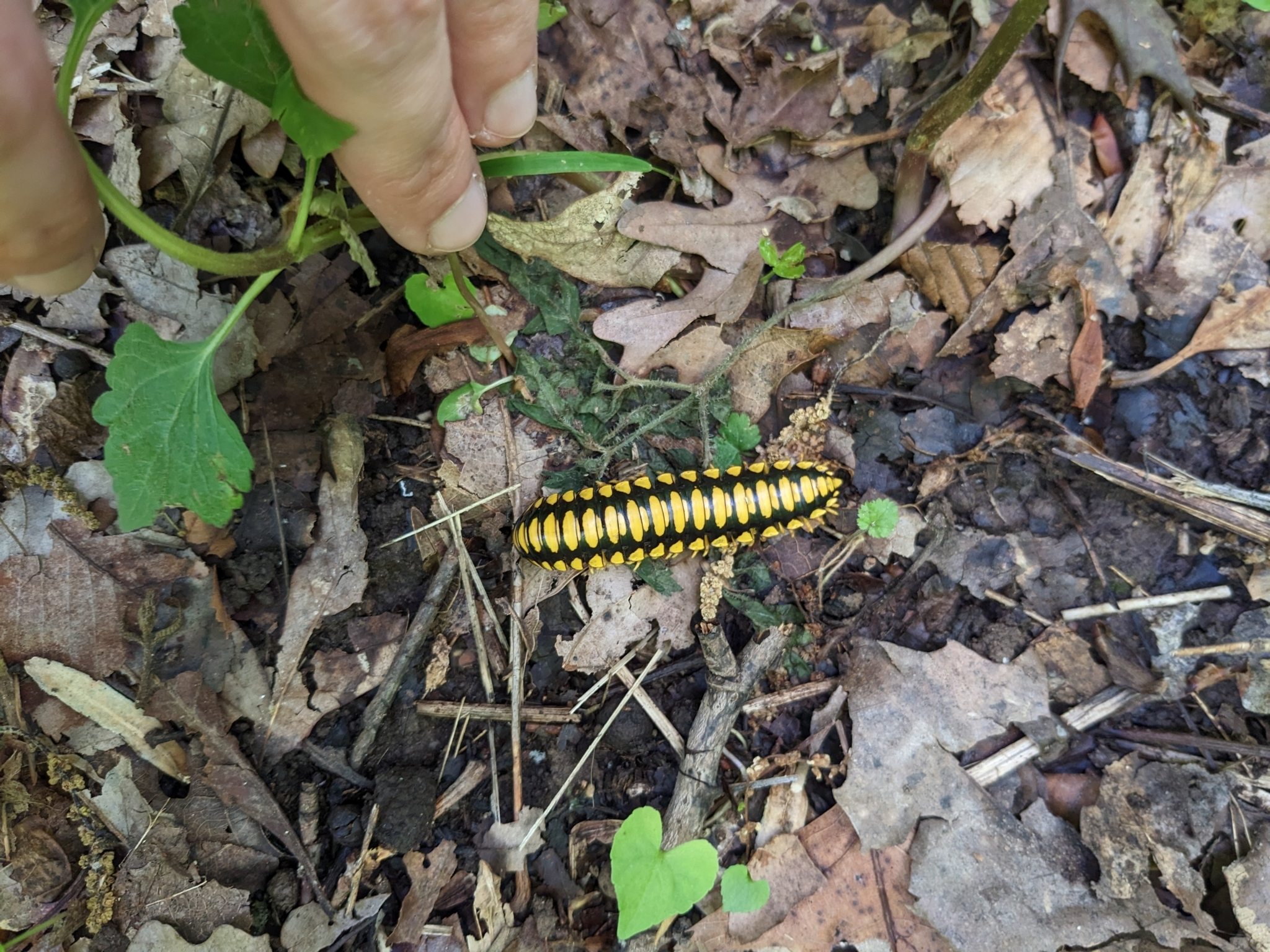

Scientific classification
- Kingdom: Animalia
- Phylum: Arthropoda
- Subphylum: Myriapoda
- Class: Diplopoda
- Order: Polydesmida
- Family: Xystodesmidae
- Genus: Apheloria
- Species: A. polychroma

Binomial name
- Apheloria polychroma Marek, Means & Hennen, 2018

Synonyms
- Apheloria roanea Chamberlin, 1947

= Apheloria polychroma =

Species of millipede

Apheloria polychroma is a species of flat-backed millipede in the family Xystodesmidae. Also known as the colorful cherry millipede, this species is found in Kentucky, Virginia, Tennessee, and Georgia. This millipede produces hydrogen cyanide and benzaldehyde as a defense mechanism, and the common name refers to the scent of benzaldehyde, which smells like cherries. This species displays bright colors in six different patterns as aposematic coloration, warning predators of toxic secretions. This millipede can reach two inches in length.

== Discovery and taxonomy ==
This species was first described in 2018 by the zoologists Paul E. Marek, Jackson C. Means, and Derek A. Hennen of the Virginia Polytechnic Institute and State University. They based the original description of this species on a large sample of specimens including a male holotype and nine paratypes (five females and four males). The type specimens were found in 2006 in the Cedars Natural Area Preserve in Lee county in Virginia. The holotype and a female paratype are deposited in the Field Museum of Natural History in Chicago. The species name derives from the Greek polu- (many) and khrōma (color), alluding to the many different color patterns displayed by this species. In 2025, a revision of the genus Apheloria deemed another millipede in this genus, A. roanea, to be a synonym of A. polychroma but retained the name A. polychroma for the sake of taxonomic stability.

== Phylogeny ==
A phylogenetic analysis of the genus Apheloria using molecular data places A. polychroma in a clade with another species in this genus, A. montana. These two close relatives form a sister group for a third species in the same genus, A. virginiensis, which emerges as the next closest relative. These three species form a sister group for a fourth species, A. whiteheadi, which occupies a more basal branch of a phylogenetic tree of this genus.

== Distribution ==
This millipede is found in the mountains of southeastern Kentucky, southwestern Virginia, eastern Tennessee, and northwestern Georgia. In Kentucky, this species has been recorded in Bell, Harlan, and Pulaski counties. In Virginia, this species has been recorded in Lee, Scott, Washington, and Wise counties and in the city of Norton. In Tennessee, this species has been recorded in Campbell, Claiborne, Hancock, Hawkins, Jefferson, Knox, Morgan, Putnam, and Sullivan counties. In Georgia, this species has been recorded in Murray county.

== Description ==
The species A. polychroma can range from 38 mm to 58 mm in length and exhibits sexual dimorphism in size, with females generally larger than males. The dorsal surface of this millipede is usually black with four yellow or orange spots on each tergite: two on the paranota, one in the middle of the anterior part (prozonite), and one in the middle of the posterior part (metazonite). In this four-spotted pattern, the legs and collum are often completely yellow, but the legs can also be red. If the collum is entirely yellow, then this color pattern distinguishes this species from all other millipedes in the family Xystodesmidae. This four-spotted pattern is found east of Cumberland Mountain, in the Powell River valley from Big Stone Gap in Virginia to Norris in Tennessee.

This species also includes five other color patterns, with these different variations generally associated with different geographic locations. For example, a second pattern features yellow spots only on the paranota and yellow or red legs. This two-spotted pattern is found west of Cumberland Mountain in Kentucky. A third pattern features red legs, with white spots on the paranota and a third white spot in the middle of each metazonite and the collum. This three-spotted pattern is found on Clinch Mountain and on the Tennessee side of Powell Mountain. In another three-spotted pattern, the spots are yellow rather than white, and the legs can be red or yellow. This fourth pattern is found around Natural Tunnel State Park, between Clinch and Powell mountains in Virginia. A fifth pattern features no spots but yellow legs and yellow stripes running along the paranota and the posterior margin of each tergite as well as a yellow anterior stripe on the collum. A sixth pattern superimposes these stripes on the four-spotted pattern. Multiple variations can often be found at the same location. For example, four different color patterns are present at High Knob in Wise county in Virginia.

Like most species in the order Polydesmida, this species features 20 segments in adults, counting the collum as the first and the telson as the last. This species features ozopores on segments 5, 7, 9, 10, 12, 13, and 15 through 19, the normal pore formula for polydesmid millipedes with 20 segments. As in most polydesmid species, adult females of these species feature 31 pairs of legs, whereas adult males feature only 30 leg pairs, excluding leg pair 8, which become a pair of gonopods in adult males. As in most species of Apheloria, the distal part of each gonopod (acropodite) in this species is uniformly narrow and curved into a circular shape, and the more proximal part (prefemur) features a projection shaped like a scythe.

This species can be distinguished from other species of Apheloria, however, based on features of the gonopods. For example, the species A. polychroma could be confused in the field with its closest relative A. montana, which is also found in eastern Tennessee. The species A. polychroma could also be confused in the field with A. corrugata where the ranges of these two species overlap in southeastern Kentucky and southwestern Virginia. The junction of the acropodite and the prefemur, however, features a distinct tubercle in both A. montana and A. corrugata but features an acute angle instead in A. polychroma. Like the species A. polychroma, the species A. uwharrie features an acute angle at this junction, but the acropodite tapers into a J-shaped distal end in A. polychroma, whereas this distal end is L-shaped in A. uwharrie.

== Ecology ==
The species A. polychroma is usually found in mesic habitats such as deciduous forests and less often found in drier habitats such as glades, for example, the mixed forest with eastern red cedar in the Cedars Natural Area Preserve in Lee county in Virginia. This millipede can be found under decaying leaves but sometimes can be observed walking on leaf litter on the forest floor. This species is bolder than other members of the family Xystodesmidae, more often seen in the open, and when perturbed, more inclined to thrash and writhe rather than roll into a defensive ball. When handled, this millipede emits a large quantity of defensive secretions.

Each of the six color patterns displayed by this species corresponds to a Müllerian mimicry ring in the region. These mimicry rings include millipede species in the genera Apheloria, Brachoria, and Appalachioria. This mimicry and overlapping ranges make it difficult to distinguish A. polychroma from other species based on color patterns alone, especially species of Brachoria, which can closely mimic the patterns displayed by A. polychroma. Each of the six color patterns used by A. polychroma is subject to mimicry by a different species of Brachoria. The species A. polychroma can be distinguished from these other species, however, based on features of the gonopods.

Like other millipedes, this species feeds on leaf litter, rotting wood, and other decaying vegation on the forest floor. These millipedes digest this plant matter and excrete feces that becomes food for microbes, fungi, and plants. These millipedes thereby play an important role in the ecosystem by enriching the soil and recycling nutrients that support other organisms in the forest.
