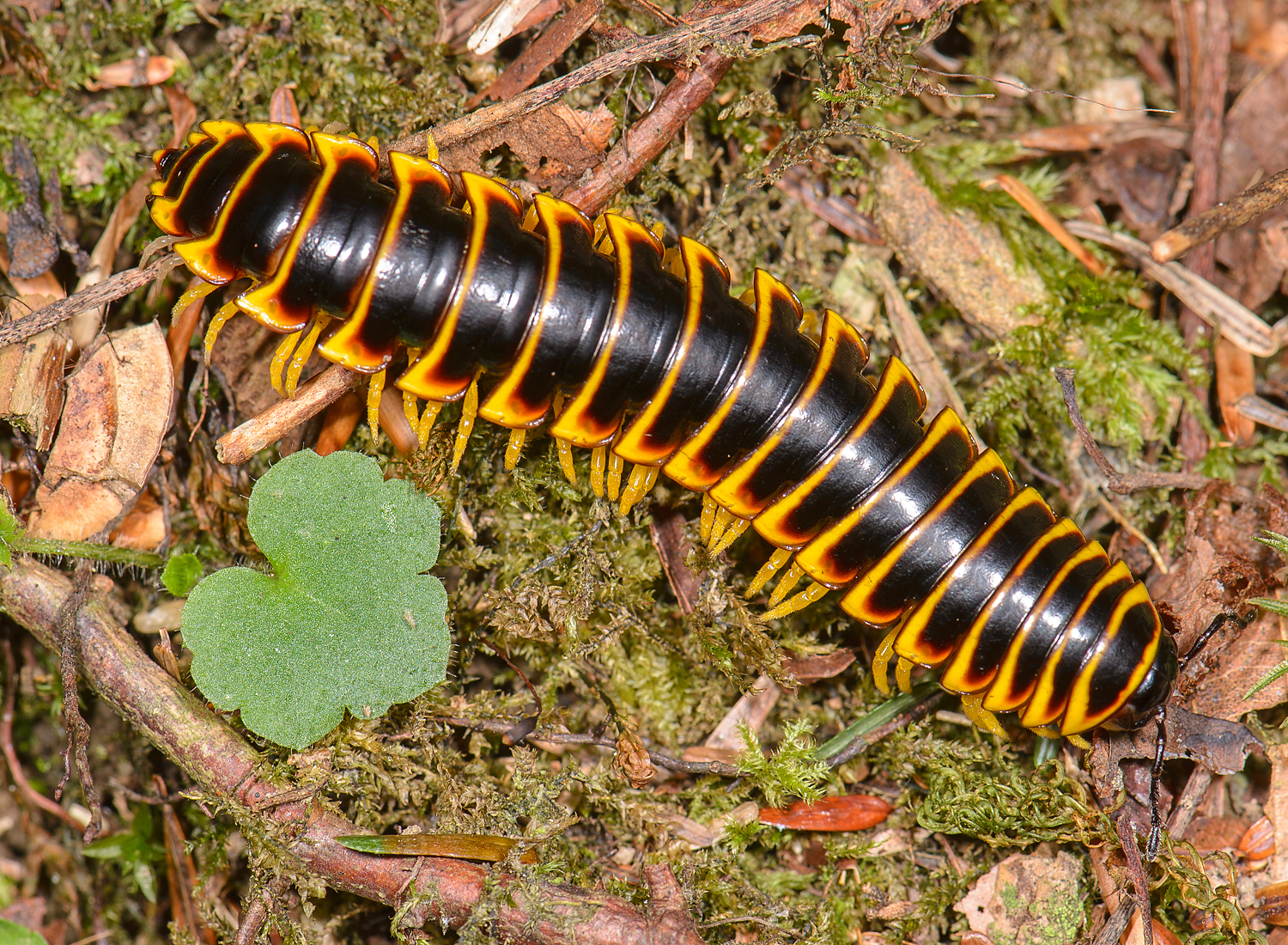
- Apheloria corrugata

Scientific classification
- Kingdom: Animalia
- Phylum: Arthropoda
- Subphylum: Myriapoda
- Class: Diplopoda
- Order: Polydesmida
- Family: Xystodesmidae
- Subfamily: Rhysodesminae
- Tribe: Apheloriini
- Genus: Apheloria; Chamberlin, 1921

Synonyms
- Leptocircus Attems, 1931

= Apheloria =

Genus of millipedes

Apheloria is a genus of flat-backed millipedes in the tribe Apheloriini within the family Xystodesmidae. These millipedes are found in the central and northeastern regions of the United States, but the distribution of this genus extends as far north as southern Quebec in Canada. Like all millipedes in the tribe Apheloriini, all species of Apheloria produce cyanide, which they emit through their ozopores as a defense against predators. Species of Apheloria are also known as cherry millipedes, because the production of cyanide also generates benzaldehyde, which smells like cherries or almonds.

These millipedes display bright colors in aposematic patterns with white, yellow, orange, or red stripes or spots contrasting with a black background, so as to warn predators of toxic secretions. Species of Apheloria in the Appalachian Mountains participate in Müllerian mimicry rings with other genera in the family Xystodesmidae, including Brachoria, which includes species that closely mimic color patterns displayed by species of Apheloria. Variations in color patterns within species and mimicry among species makes it difficult to identify species of Apheloria based on color patterns.

== Taxonomy ==
The genus was first proposed by Ralph Vary Chamberlin in 1921 to include a group of millipede species based on the shape of the male gonopods. He designated Apheloria montana as the type species for this new genus. In 1999, the American zoologist Richard L. Hoffman revised this genus, deeming Leptocircus to be a junior synonym of Apheloria.

== Description ==
Like other millipedes in the tribe Apheloriini, species of Apheloria are large, typically ranging from 40 mm to 60 mm in length. Millipedes in this genus display a stripe or two to four spots on each tergite, with the colors variable. Stripes are usually yellow, and the paranota often feature either red spots or a red tinge on the inner margin of the spots on the paranota. Like most species in the order Polydesmida, species of Apheloria feature 20 segments in adults, counting the collum as the first and the telson as the last. Accordingly, as in most polydesmid species, adult females in this genus feature 31 pairs of legs, whereas adult males feature only 30 leg pairs, excluding leg pair 8, which become a pair of gonopods in adult males.

In most species of Apheloria, the distal part of each gonopod (acropodite) is uniformly narrow and curved into a circular shape, and the more proximal part (prefemur) features a projection shaped like a scythe, but the gonopods of one species, Apheloria whiteheadi, deviate from the usual form in several respects. For example, the acropodite in A. whiteheadi is ρ-shaped rather than circular (O-shaped), and the projection on the prefemur is short and broad rather than long and shaped like a scythe. The differences between species in gonopod morphology are otherwise subtle in this genus, which makes the identification of these species based on morphology challenging.

== Phylogeny ==
A phylogenetic analysis of the genus Apheloria using molecular data confirms the monophyly of this genus as a clade containing six species, including A. whiteheadi. This analysis finds this species nested among the other five species in a phylogenetic tree of this genus, notwithstanding the unusual morphology of the gonopods in A. whiteheadi. The three species A. montana, A. polychroma, and A. virginiensis form a sister group for A. whiteheadi, which occupies a more basal branch in this phylogenetic tree. These four species form a sister group for A. corrugata and A. uwharrie, which form another clade on a separate branch of this tree.

Phylogenetic analysis of the tribe Apheloriini places the genus Apheloria in a clade with species of Rudiloria, which emerge as the closest relatives of Apheloria in this tribe. The closely related genera Apheloria and Rudiloria share several features of the gonopods, including a flange on the basal part of the acropodite. The two genera can be distinguished, however, based on the shape of the acropodite, which is oval (0-shaped) in Rudiloria but circular (O-shaped) in most species of Apheloria and ρ-shaped in A. whiteheadi.

== Distribution and habitat ==
Species in this genus are widespread in deciduous forests in North America, where these millipedes are found as far north as southern Wisconsin, southern Michigan, and the Island of Montreal in Quebec. The distribution of this genus extends into western New England as far as the Connecticut River, to the western shore of Chesapeake Bay, to Bald Head Island in North Carolina, and to northeastern South Carolina. This distribution extends as far west as eastern Oklahoma and as far south as southeastern Oklahoma, into Alabama as far as the Tennessee River, and into northern South Carolina.

== Species ==
According to the 2025 revision of the genus Apheloria, this genus includes the following six species:

- Apheloria corrugata (Wood, 1864)
- Apheloria montana (Bollman, 1887)
- Apheloria polychroma Marek, Means & Hennen, 2018
- Apheloria uwharrie Marek, Means, Hennen & Tingley, 2025
- Apheloria virginiensis (Drury, 1770)
- Apheloria whiteheadi (Shelley, 1986)

Some references list the following millipedes in this genus:

- Apheloria luminosa Kenyon, 1893
- Apheloria montezumae (Attems, 1899)
- Apheloria tigana Chamberlin, 1939

The 2025 revision of this genus, however, removed A. luminosa from the genus Apheloria and deemed A. luminosa to be a junior synonym of Pleuroloma flavipes. The Austrian myripodologist Carl Attems originally described A. montezumae in 1899 based on a single male specimen, but in 1938, he expressed doubt about the validity of this species. A treatment of this genus in 1999 and a revision of this genus in 2025 both ignored A. montezumae. In 2017, authorities deemed A. tigana to be a junior synonym of A. virginiensis based on morphology. The 2025 revision of this genus confirmed this proposed synonymy using molecular evidence.

== Gallery ==
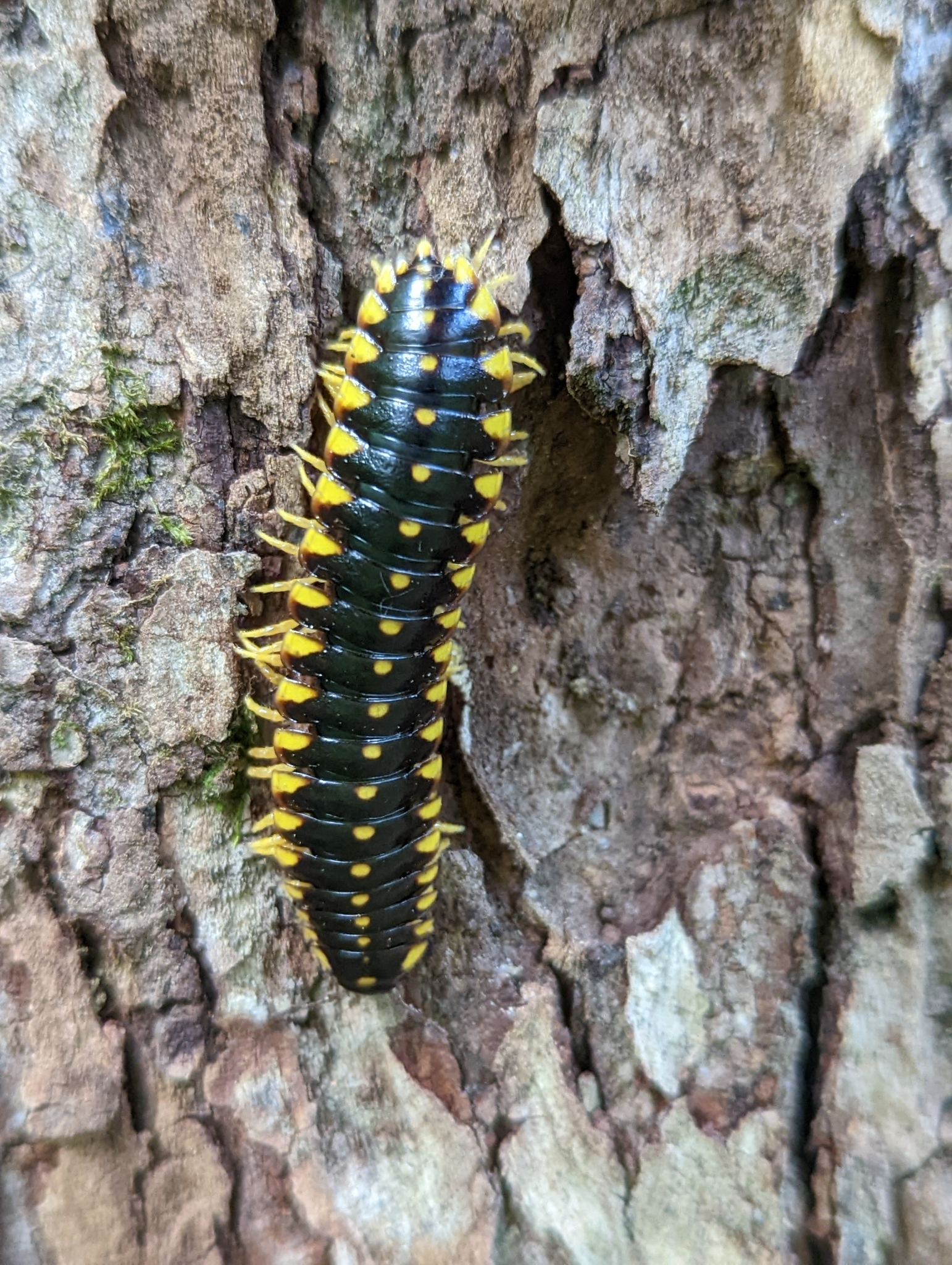
Apheloria montana, North Carolina

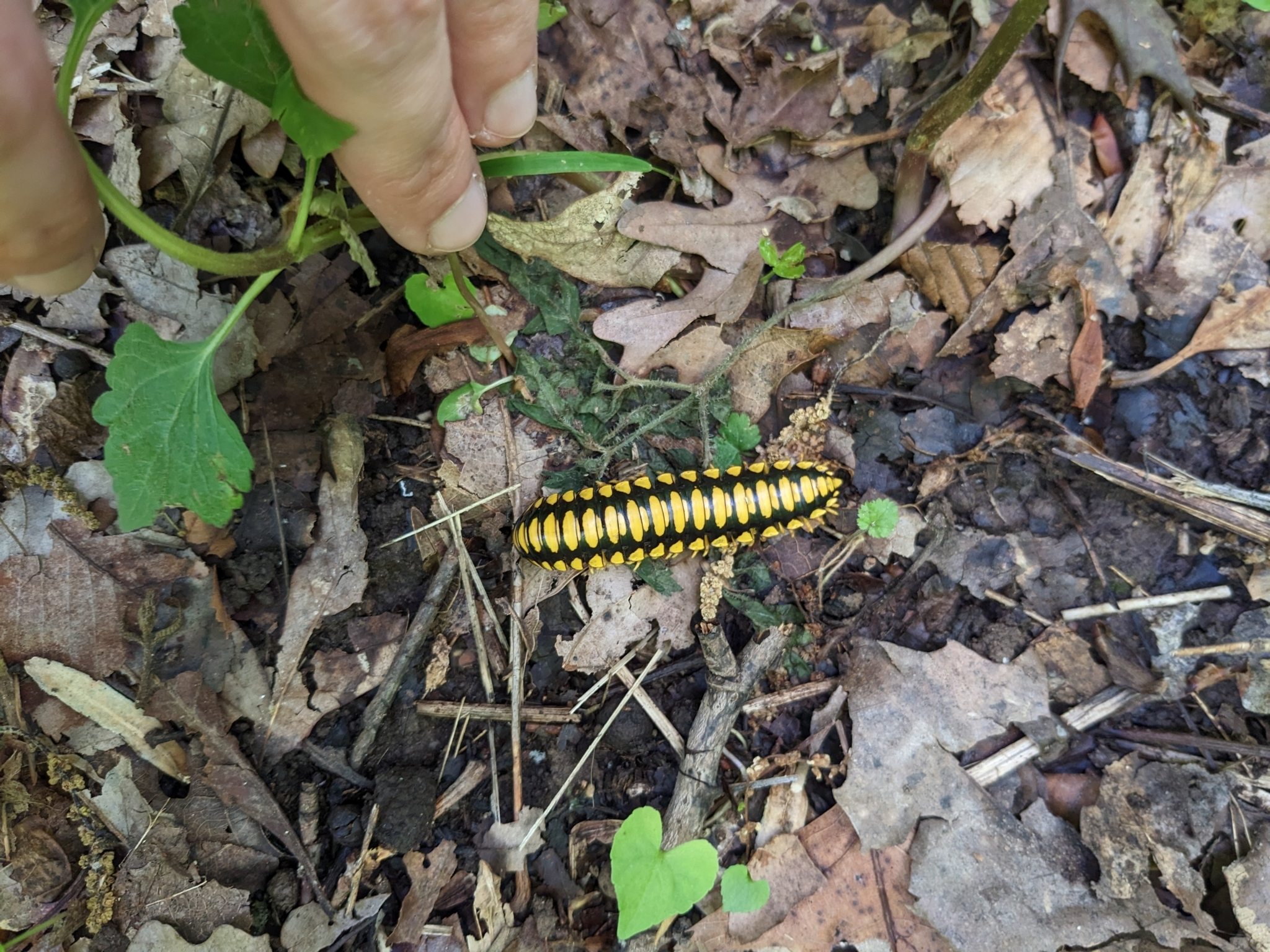
Apheloria polychroma, Tennessee

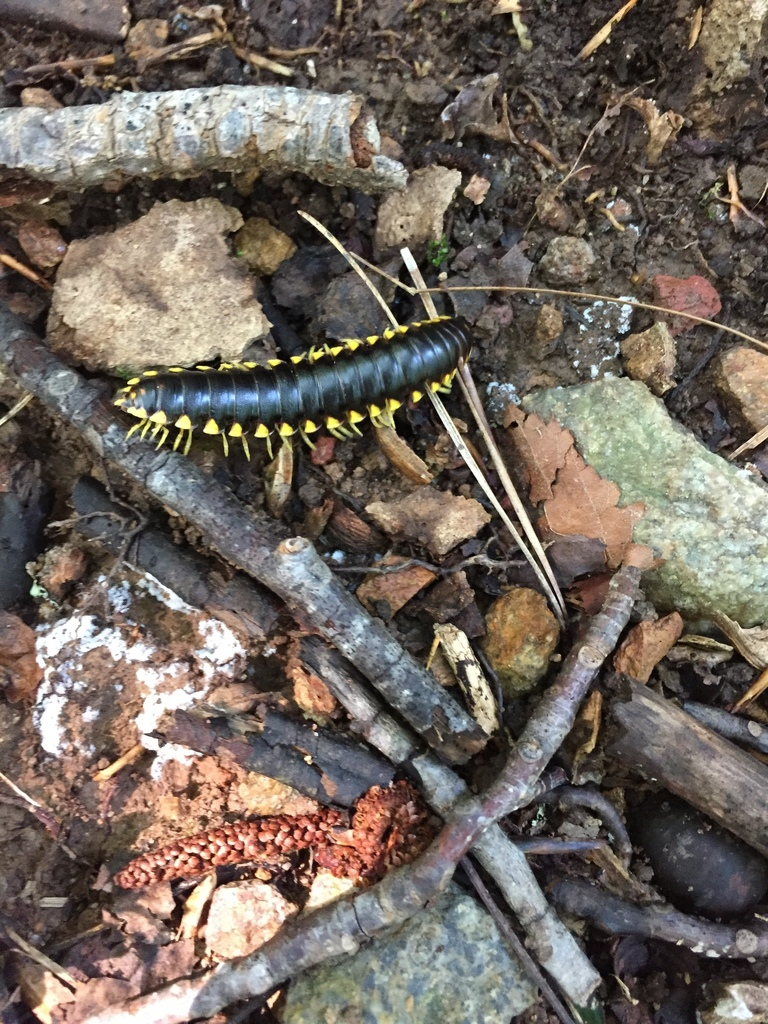
Apheloria virginiensis, North Carolina
