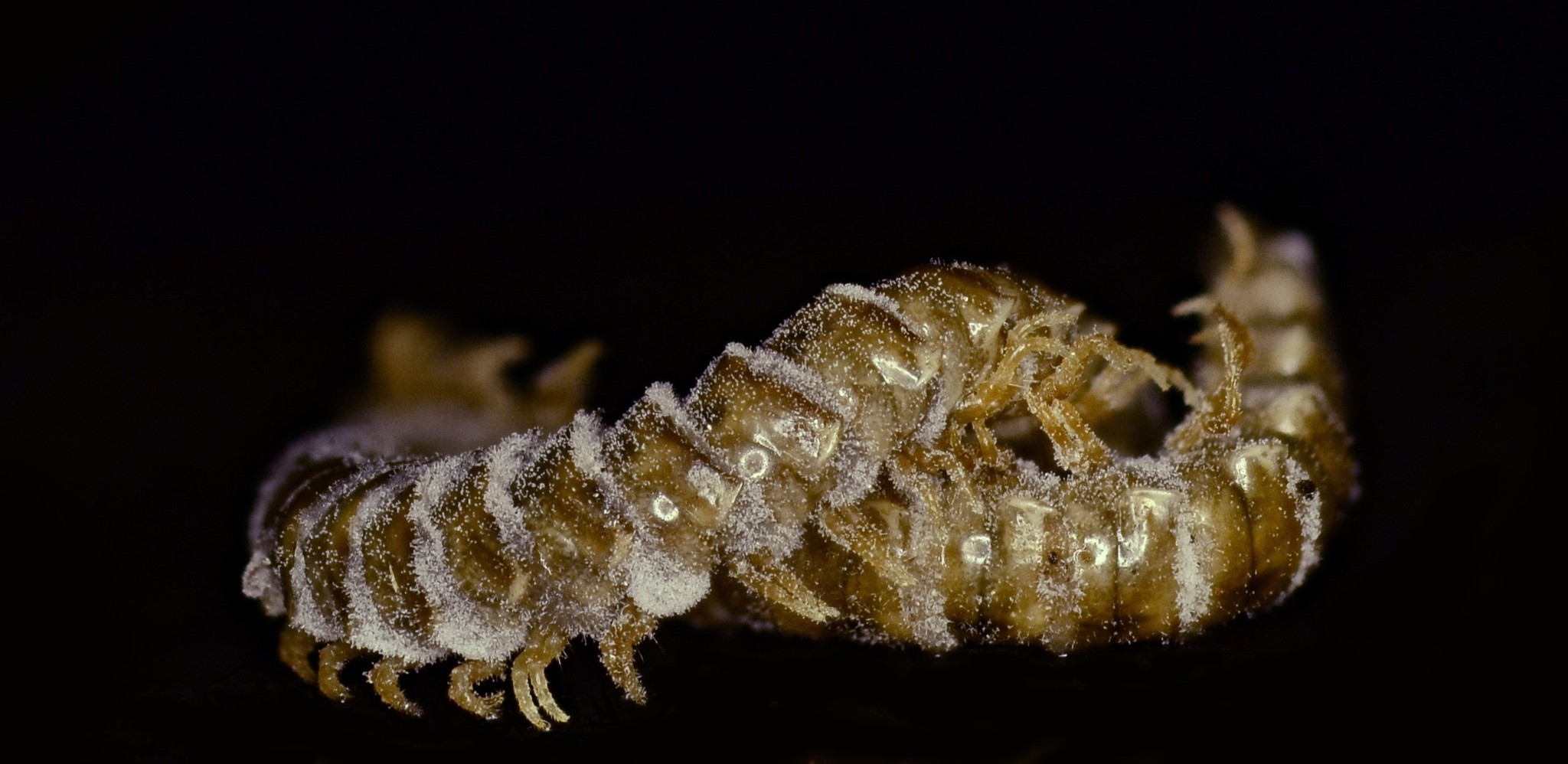
- Growing on dead millipedes

Scientific classification
- Kingdom: Fungi
- Division: Entomophthoromycota
- Class: Entomophthoromycetes
- Order: Entomophthorales
- Family: Entomophthoraceae
- Genus: Arthrophaga
- Species: A. myriapodina

Binomial name
- Arthrophaga myriapodina K. T. Hodge & A. E. Hajek

= Arthrophaga myriapodina =

Fungus that affects millipedes

Arthrophaga myriapodina is a fungus in the Entomophthorales that parasitizes the millipedes Apheloria virginiensis corrugata, Boraria infesta, and Nannaria sp. Infected millipedes typically climb to an elevated spot before death.

== Taxonomic history ==
Arthrophaga myriapodina was first collected by Roland Thaxter from North Carolina in 1886 on Boraria infesta, but he did not formally describe or name it. In 1916, A. T. Speare sent Thaxter additional specimens labelled as Entomophthora myriapodina, but the name was never validly published. Kathie Hodge, Ann E. Hajek, and Andrii P. Gryganskyi showed that A. myriapodina is distinct from related taxa including Entomophthora and formally named it as the type of a new genus.

== Morphology ==
Arthrophaga myriapodina forms distinct white to light brown pustules that emerge between the segments of a millipede. Its primary conidia are forcibly discharged, pear-shaped and contain 8–18 nuclei. Notably, no resting spore stage has been observed.

== Ecology ==
Arthrophaga myriapodina is found in eastern North America from May to October, usually 12 to 24 hours after rain.
