= Brachoria dentata =

Scientific classification
- Kingdom: Animalia
- Phylum: Arthropoda
- Subphylum: Myriapoda
- Class: Diplopoda
- Order: Polydesmida
- Family: Xystodesmidae
- Genus: Brachoria
- Species: B. dentata

Binomial name
- Brachoria dentata Keeton, 1959

Species of millipede

Brachoria dentata, the Pennington Gap mimic millipede, is an Appalachian mimic millipede in the Xystodesmidae family.

It is common in Eastern United States mixed mesophytic deciduous forests of the Appalachian Mountains in Kentucky, Virginia, and Tennessee.

Similar to Apheloria virginiensis corrugata and several co-occurring Brachoria species, it is boldly patterned black and yellow or red. It is distinguished from other species in the genus by the presence and placement (cephalic side) of the cingulum on the telopodite of the male gonopod.
