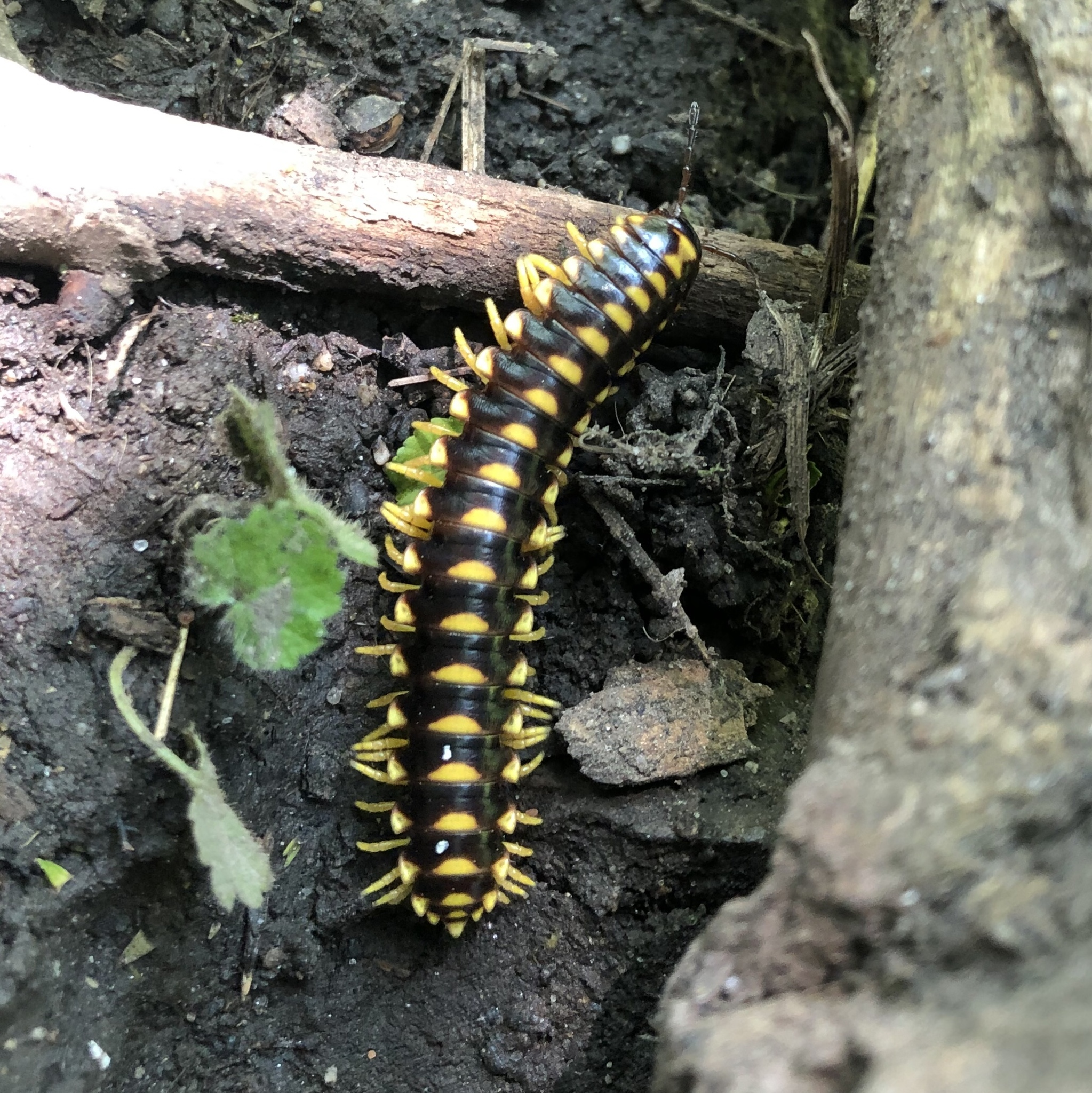
- Rudiloria trimaculata trimaculata, Canada

Scientific classification
- Kingdom: Animalia
- Phylum: Arthropoda
- Subphylum: Myriapoda
- Class: Diplopoda
- Order: Polydesmida
- Family: Xystodesmidae
- Tribe: Apheloriini
- Genus: Rudiloria
- Species: R. trimaculata

Binomial name
- Rudiloria trimaculata (Wood, 1864)

= Rudiloria trimaculata =

Species of millipede

Rudiloria trimaculata is a species of millipede in the family Xystodesmidae. It is found in the northeastern United States and southeastern Canada.

== Subspecies ==
These subspecies belong to the species Rudiloria trimaculata:

- Rudiloria trimaculata tortua
- Rudiloria trimaculata trimaculata
