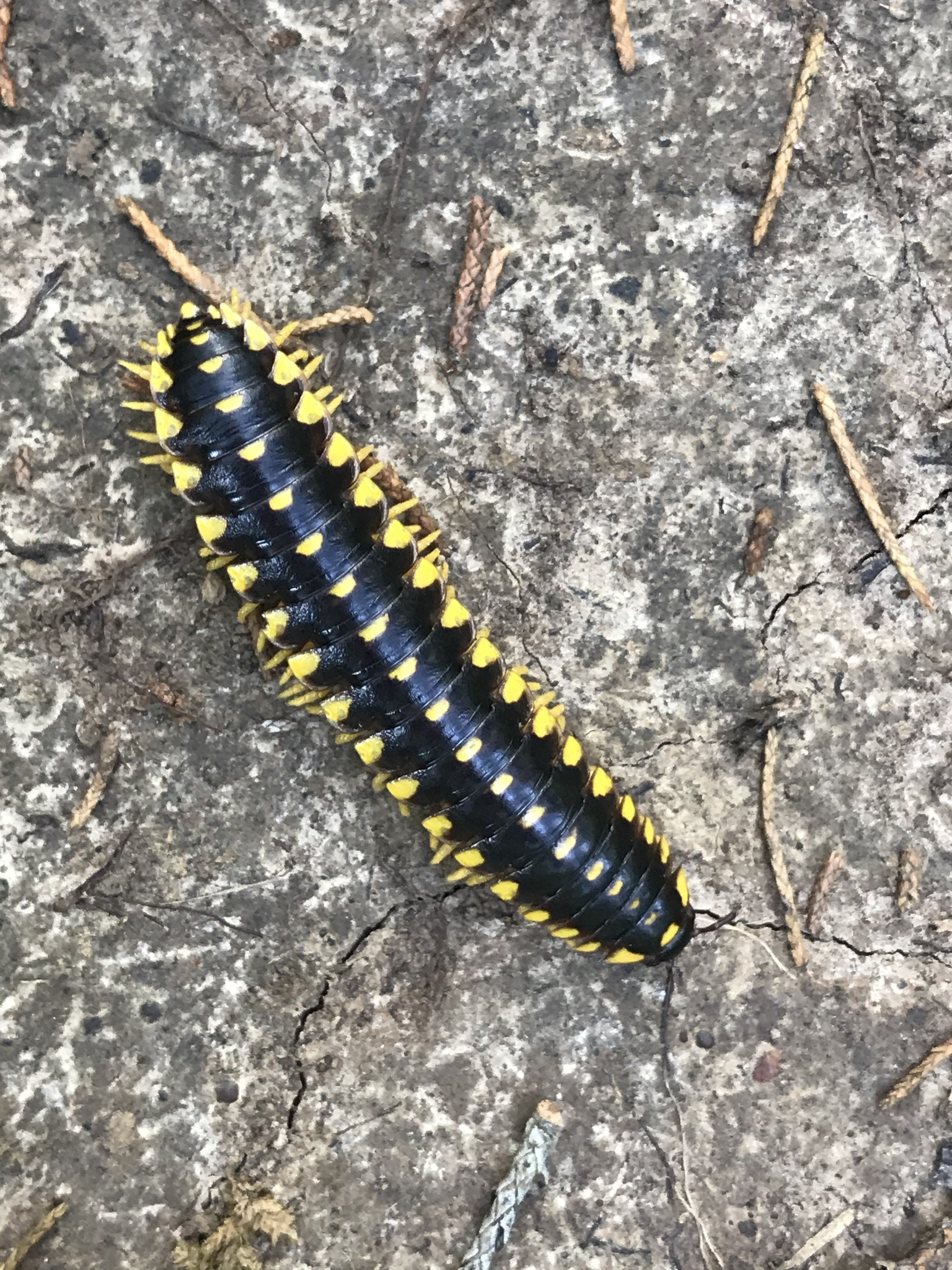
- Apheloria montana, Tennessee

Scientific classification
- Kingdom: Animalia
- Phylum: Arthropoda
- Subphylum: Myriapoda
- Class: Diplopoda
- Order: Polydesmida
- Family: Xystodesmidae
- Genus: Apheloria
- Species: A. montana

Binomial name
- Apheloria montana (Bollman, 1887)

Synonyms
- Fontaria montana Bollman, 1887; Apheloria aspila Chamberlin, 1939; Apheloria unaka Chamberlin, 1939

= Apheloria montana =

Species of millipede

Apheloria montana is a species of flat-backed millipede in the family Xystodesmidae. This millipede is the type species for the genus Apheloria. This species, also known as the mountain cherry millipede, is found in Tennessee and North Carolina. Like other species of Apheloria, this millipede produces hydrogen cyanide and benzaldehyde as a defense mechanism, and these compounds smell like cherries or almonds. This species displays bright yellow or orange spots as aposematic coloration, which serves as a signal of toxicity to predators. This millipede is large and can reach two inches in length.

== Discovery and taxonomy ==
This species was first described in 1887 by the American naturalist Charles H. Bollman. He based the original description of this species on a male holotype found at Wolf Creek near Del Rio in Cocke county in Tennessee. This holotype is deposited in the Smithsonian Institution in Washington, D.C. Bollman originally described this species under the name Fontaria montana. In 1921, the American biologist Ralph V. Chamberlin proposed Apheloria as a new genus and designated F. montana as the type species.

== Phylogeny ==
In 2025, a phylogenetic analysis of the genus Apheloria using molecular data placed A. montana in a clade with another species in this genus, A. polychroma. These two close relatives form a sister group for a third species in the same genus, A. virginiensis, which emerges as the next closest relative. These three species form a sister group for a fourth species, A. whiteheadi, which occupies a more basal branch of a phylogenetic tree of this genus.

== Distribution ==
The species A. montana is found in eastern Tennessee and western North Carolina. In Tennessee, this millipede has been recorded not only in Cocke county but also in Greene, Unicoi, and Washington counties. In North Carolina, this millipede is known from Buncombe, Madison, McDowell, and Mitchell counties.

== Description ==
This large millipede can reach about a gram in weight and can range from 42 mm to 55 mm in length. This species exhibits sexual dimorphism in size, with females generally larger than males. This species is usually black on the dorsal surface with yellow legs and yellow spots on the paranota and another series of yellow spots running down the middle of the back (one in the middle of the collum and one in the middle of each metazonite). In Little Switzerland in Mitchell county in North Carolina, this species features smaller orange spots and orange legs.

Like most species in the order Polydesmida, this species features 20 segments in adults, counting the collum as the first and the telson as the last. Accordingly, as in most polydesmid species, adult females feature 31 pairs of legs, whereas adult males feature only 30 leg pairs, excluding leg pair 8, which become a pair of gonopods in adult males. As in most species of Apheloria, the distal part of each gonopod (acropodite) in this species is uniformly narrow and curved into a circular shape, and the more proximal part (prefemur) features a projection shaped like a scythe.

This species can be distinguished from other species of Apheloria, however, based on features of the gonopods. For example, the species A. montana could be confused in the field with its closest relative A. polychroma, which is also found in eastern Tennessee. The junction of the acropodite and the prefemur, however, features a distinct tubercle in A. montana but features an acute angle instead in A. polychroma. Furthermore, the species A. montana can be distinguished from its close relative A. virginiensis, which is also found in North Carolina, based on the shape of the acropodite, which is smoothly circular in A. montana but features a distinct bend like an elbow in A. virginiensis.

== Ecology ==
The species A. montana is usually found in mesic habitats such as deciduous forests. This millipede can also be found in habitats with less moisture, such as mixed forests or groves of rhododendron. This species has been found living among pine, maple, oak, beech, tulip poplar, witch hazel, alder, sweetgum, and buckeye. This millipede is usually found under decaying leaves on the forest floor.

This species feeds on leaf litter but also relies on corpophagy to survive. Millipedes fed leaf litter but deprived of their own feces in a laboratory experiment became inactive and ceased feces production after 21 days, with some millipedes losing weight or dying within a week. The evidence indicates that this millipede does not rely on internal symbionts to process leaf litter and instead relies on bacterial activity in fecal pellets to digest cellulose or possibly to fix nitrogen.
