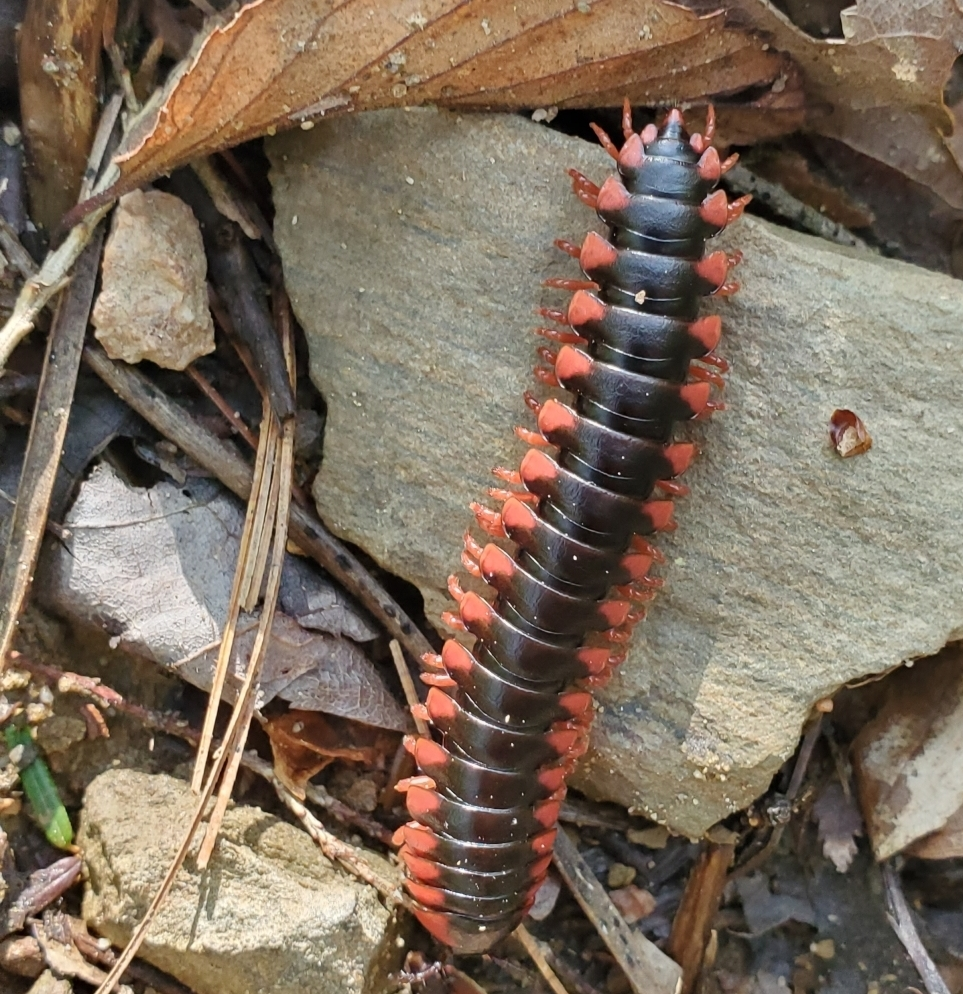
- Rudiloria kleinpeteri, Virginia

Scientific classification
- Kingdom: Animalia
- Phylum: Arthropoda
- Subphylum: Myriapoda
- Class: Diplopoda
- Order: Polydesmida
- Family: Xystodesmidae
- Tribe: Apheloriini
- Genus: Rudiloria
- Species: R. kleinpeteri

Binomial name
- Rudiloria kleinpeteri (Hoffman, 1949)

= Rudiloria kleinpeteri =

Species of millipede

Rudiloria kleinpeteri is a species of millipede in the family Xystodesmidae. Its distribution range is limited to an area in Virginia and West Virginia in the United States.
