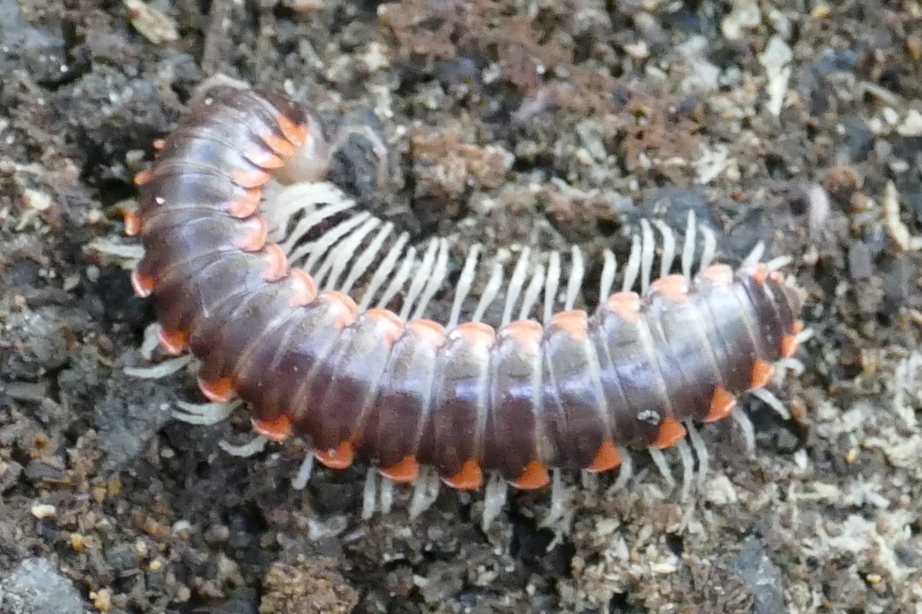
- Howellaria infesta

Scientific classification
- Kingdom: Animalia
- Phylum: Arthropoda
- Subphylum: Myriapoda
- Class: Diplopoda
- Order: Polydesmida
- Family: Xystodesmidae
- Tribe: Rhysodesmini
- Genus: Howellaria; Hoffman, 1950

= Howellaria =

Genus of millipedes

Howellaria is a genus of flat-backed millipedes in the family Xystodesmidae. There are about two described species in Howellaria.

== Species ==
These two species belong to the genus Howellaria:

- Howellaria deturkiana (Causey, 1942)
- Howellaria infesta (Chamberlin, 1918)
