= Pleuroloma cala =

Scientific classification
- Kingdom: Animalia
- Phylum: Arthropoda
- Subphylum: Myriapoda
- Class: Diplopoda
- Order: Polydesmida
- Family: Xystodesmidae
- Genus: Pleuroloma
- Species: P. cala

Binomial name
- Pleuroloma cala (Chamberlin, 1939)

Species of millipede

Pleuroloma cala is a species in the order Polydesmida ("flat-backed millipedes"), in the class Diplopoda ("millipedes"). Pleuroloma cala is found in North America.
