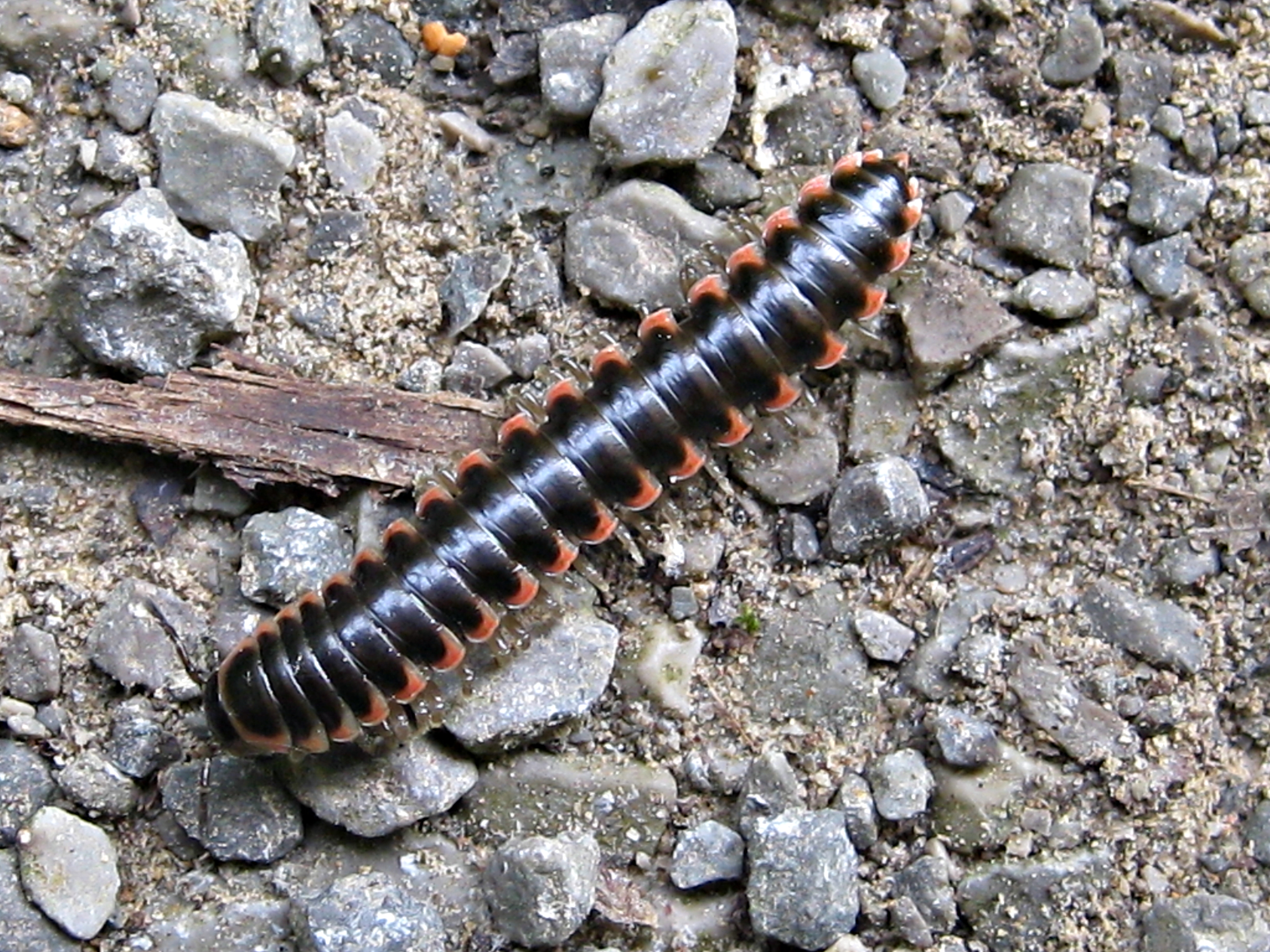
- Millipede Pleuroloma

Scientific classification
- Kingdom: Animalia
- Phylum: Arthropoda
- Subphylum: Myriapoda
- Class: Diplopoda
- Order: Polydesmida
- Family: Xystodesmidae
- Subfamily: Rhysodesminae
- Tribe: Rhysodesmini
- Genus: Pleuroloma; Rafinesque, 1820

= Pleuroloma =

Genus of millipedes

Pleuroloma is a genus of flat-backed millipedes in the family Xystodesmidae. There are at least 4 described species in Pleuroloma.

== Species ==
- Pleuroloma cala (Chamberlin, 1939)
- Pleuroloma flavipes (Rafinesque, 1820)
- Pleuroloma pinicola (Shelley, 1980)
- Pleuroloma plana (Shelley, 1980)
