= Apheloria uwharrie =

Scientific classification
- Kingdom: Animalia
- Phylum: Arthropoda
- Subphylum: Myriapoda
- Class: Diplopoda
- Order: Polydesmida
- Family: Xystodesmidae
- Genus: Apheloria
- Species: A. uwharrie

Binomial name
- Apheloria uwharrie Marek, Means, Hennen & Tingley, 2025

Species of millipede

Apheloria uwharrie is a species of flat-backed millipede in the family Xystodesmidae. This millipede is found in North Carolina and South Carolina. Like all species of Apheloria, this millipede produces cyanide and emits this chemical through its ozopores as a defense against predators. This species is also known as the Uwharrie cherry millipede, because the production of cyanide also generates benzaldehyde, which smells like cherries or almonds. This millipede displays bright colors in aposematic patterns with yellow, orange, or red stripes or spots contrasting with a black background, so as to warn predators of toxic secretions. This species can reach two inches in length.

== Discovery and distribution ==
This species was first described in 2025 by Paul E. Marek, Jackson C. Means, Derek A. Hennen, and Carol Tingley. They based the original description of this species on an examination of 13 specimens, including a male holotype and five paratypes (three females and two males). The type specimens were found in South Carolina near the Robert M. Grissom Parkway in Myrtle Beach in Horry County in 2018. The other specimens were found in North Carolina, in Morrow Mountain State Park in Stanly County and the Uwharrie Mountains in 2016 and in the Uwharrie National Forest in Randolph County and Montgomery County in 2022. The species name refers to the Uwharrie Mountains, where these specimens were found in North Carolina. The holotype and a female paratype are deposited in the insect collection of the Virginia Polytechnic Institute and State University in Blacksburg.

== Phylogeny ==
A phylogenetic analysis of the genus Apheloria using molecular data places A. uwharrie in a clade with another species in the same genus, A. corrugata. The species A. corrugata emerges as the closest relative of A. uwharrie. These two close relatives form a sister group for another clade containing the other four species in this genus.

== Description ==
The species A. wharrie can range between 46 mm and 57 mm in length and exhibits sexual dimorphism in size, with females generally larger than males. The dorsal surface of this species displays four different color patterns on black backgrounds, with these different variations usually associated with different geographic locations. In the Unwharrie Mountains, this species can feature yellow legs, three yellow spots on each tergite (with two on the paranota and the third in the middle of the posterior margin), and another yellow spot in the middle of the anterior margin of the collum. In Myrtle Beach, this species can feature red stripes on the posterior margin of each tergite and a red spot in the middle of the anterior margin of the collum. Another variation in Myrtle Beach superimposes a red three-spotted pattern on the red-striped pattern. A fourth variation features yellow legs and a three-spotted pattern with yellow spots on the paranota and only faint orange spots down the middle, such that this pattern seems almost two-spotted.

Like most species in the order Polydesmida, this species features 20 segments in adults, counting the collum as the first and the telson as the last. This species features ozopores on segments 5, 7, 9, 10, 12, 13, and 15 through 19, the normal pore formula for polydesmid millipedes with 20 segments. As in most polydesmid species, adult females of these species feature 31 pairs of legs, whereas adult males feature only 30 leg pairs, excluding leg pair 8, which become a pair of gonopods in adult males. As in most species of Apheloria, the distal part of each gonopod (acropodite) in this species is uniformly narrow and curved into a circular shape, and the more proximal part (prefemur) features a projection shaped like a scythe.

This species can be distinguished from other species of Apheloria, however, based on features of the gonopods. For example, the species A. uwharrie could be confused with A. virginiensis, which is also found in North Carolina and can also feature yellow or red spots. The acropodite, however, is smoothly circular in A. uwharrie but features a distinct bend like an elbow in A. virginiensis. Furthermore, the junction of the acropodite and the prefemur features a distinct tubercle in A. virginiensis but features an acute angle instead in A. uwharrie. This junction also distinguishes A. uwharrie from its close relative A. corrugata, which also features a tubercle at this junction. Like the species A. uwharrie, the species A. polychroma features an acute angle at this junction, but the acropodite tapers into a J-shaped distal end in A. polychroma, whereas this distal end is L-shaped in A. uwharrie.

== Ecology ==
The species A. uwharrie is found in habitats with less moisture than typically observed for other species in the same tribe (Apheloriini). In Myrtle Bearch, this millipede was found in dry leaf litter in a forest of oak, pine, and magnolia trees. In the Uwharrie National Forest, this millipede was found on dry slopes and ridges with hardwood trees. In Morrow Mountain State Park, this millipede can be found among oak, huckleberry, and maple in a damp deciduous forest.
