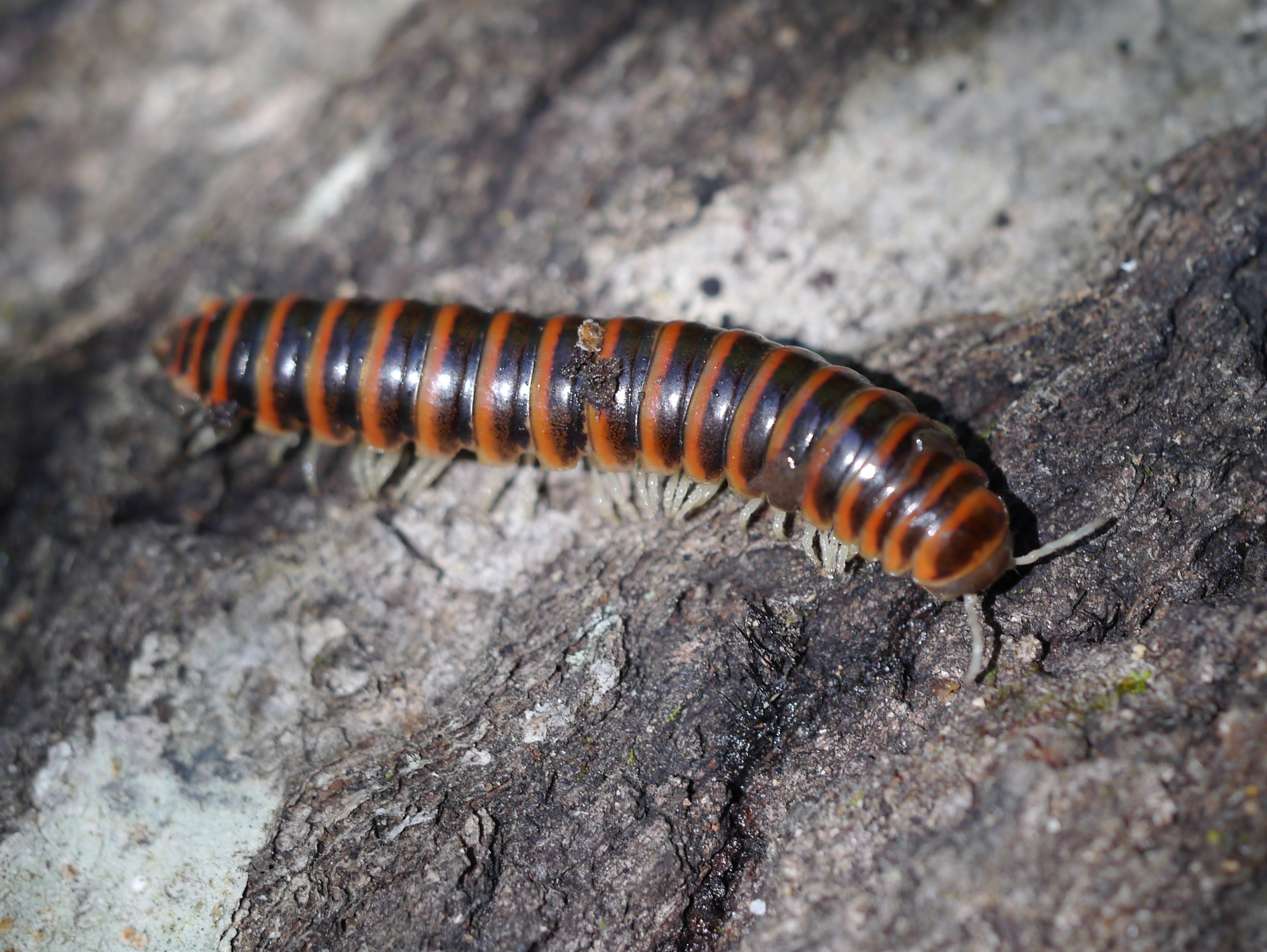

Scientific classification
- Kingdom: Animalia
- Phylum: Arthropoda
- Subphylum: Myriapoda
- Class: Diplopoda
- Order: Polydesmida
- Family: Xystodesmidae
- Genus: Howellaria
- Species: H. deturkiana

Binomial name
- Howellaria deturkiana (Causey, 1942)

= Howellaria deturkiana =

Species of millipede

Howellaria deturkiana is a species of flat-backed millipede in the family Xystodesmidae. It is found in North America.
