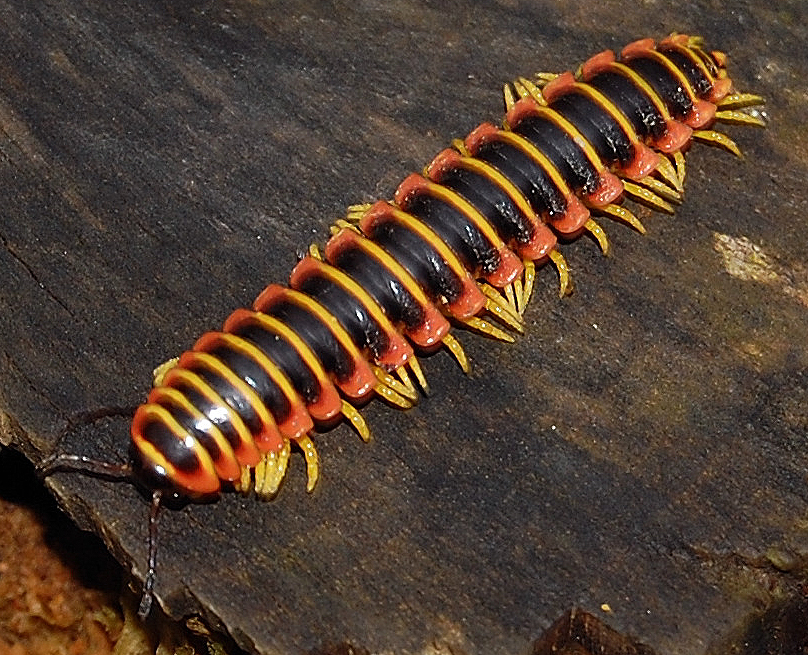

Scientific classification
- Kingdom: Animalia
- Phylum: Arthropoda
- Subphylum: Myriapoda
- Class: Diplopoda
- Order: Polydesmida
- Family: Xystodesmidae
- Genus: Apheloria
- Species: A. corrugata

Binomial name
- Apheloria corrugata (Wood, 1864)

Synonyms
- Polydesmus (Fontaria) corrugatus Wood, 1864; Fontaria butleriana Bollman, 1888; Leptocircus inexpectatus Attems, 1931; Apheloria adela Chamberlin, 1939; Apheloria iowa Chamberlin, 1939; Apheloria reducta Chamberlin, 1939; Apheloria pinicola Chamberlin, 1947; Apheloria asburna Chamberlin, 1949

= Apheloria corrugata =

Species of millipede

Apheloria corrugata is a species of flat-backed millipede in the family Xystodesmidae. Also known as the aromatic cherry millipede, this species emits defensive chemicals that smell like cherries or almonds. These chemicals include benzaldehyde and hydrogen cyanide and are toxic to predators that might eat this millipede. A single millipede of this species can produce enough cyanide to kill six mice or 18 pigeons. Although this millipede emits amounts too small to harm humans, authorities recommend washing hands with soap and water after touching millipedes as a precaution. Also known as the pink and yellow cherry millipede, this species displays bright colors in a wide variety of patterns. These colors are aposematic, acting as a signal of toxicity to predators. This millipede is large as well as fragrant, with some adults reaching 70 mm (more than 2 in.) in length.

== Distribution ==
This millipede is found across northeastern North America and has the broadest distribution of any species in the genus Apheloria. The geographical range of this species extends from Virginia to western Connecticut and Montreal. This range also extends from southeastern Iowa, southern Wisconsin, southern Michigan, and southeastern Ontario to southern Missouri, Oklahoma, northern Arkansas, western Tennessee, and northwestern Alabama.

== Discovery ==
This species was first described in 1864 by the American biologist Horatio C. Wood Jr. He based the original description of this species on multiple specimens including both sexes. These specimens were found in Michigan and at Trenton Falls in Oneida County in New York. A male syntype from Trenton Falls is deposited in the Smithsonian Institution in Washington, D.C.

== Taxonomy and phylogeny ==
Wood originally described this species in 1864 under the name Polydesmus (Fontaria) corrugatus. In 1938, the Austrian myriapodologist Carl Attems placed this species in the genus Apheloria under the name A. corrugata. In 1999, the American zoologist Richard L. Hoffman deemed A. corrugata to be a subspecies of another species in the same genus, A. virginiensis.

In 2025, however, a phylogenetic analysis of the genus Apheloria using molecular data found A. corrugata to be a species distinct from the species A. virginiensis, which is found only in Virginia and North Carolina. This analysis places A. corrugata in a clade with another species in the same genus, A. uwharrie, which is found in North Carolina and South Carolina and emerges as the closest relative of A. corrugata. These two close relatives form a sister group for another clade containing the other four species in this genus, including A. virginiensis.

== Description ==
The species A. corrugata is a large millipede, typically ranging from 40 mm to 60 mm in length. This millipede exhibits sexual dimorphism in size, with females typically larger than males. This species displays a variety of color patterns, but in the most common pattern, this millipede is dark black with a yellow stripe on the posterior edge of the dorsal surface of each body segment as well as on the anterior edge of the collum, red or pink spots on the paranota, and yellow legs. This pattern distinguishes this millipede from all other species in the family Xystodesmidae, except for the species Appalachioria calcaria, which mimics this pattern in Virginia.

In another common pattern displayed by the species A. corrugata, the paranota feature yellow stripes along the lateral margins rather than red or pink spots. In other patterns, the legs and the spots on the paranota are yellow, but the dorsal surface lacks yellow stripes, which are sometimes replaced by a yellow spot in the middle of the collum and in the middle of each metazonite. Less common patterns include pink rather than yellow stripes or feature different combinations of elements from the more common patterns.

Like most species in the order Polydesmida, this species features 20 segments in adults, counting the collum as the first and the telson as the last. Accordingly, as in most polydesmid species, adult females feature 31 pairs of legs, whereas adult males feature only 30 leg pairs, excluding leg pair 8, which become a pair of gonopods in adult males. As in most species of Apheloria, the distal part of each gonopod (acropodite) in this species is uniformly narrow and curved into a circular shape, and the more proximal part (prefemur) features a projection shaped like a scythe.

This species can be distinguished from other species of Apheloria, however, based on features of the gonopods. For example, the species A. corrugata could be confused in the field with the species A. virginiensis where the ranges of these two species overlap in southern Virginia. The acropodite, however, is smoothly circular in A. corrugata but features a distinct bend like an elbow in A. virginiensis. The species A. corrugata could also be confused in the field with A. polychroma where the ranges of these two species overlap in southeastern Kentucky and southwestern Virginia. The junction of the acropodite and the prefemur, however, features a distinct tubercle in A. corrugata but features an acute angle instead in A. polychroma. This tubercle also distinguishes A. corrugata from its close relative A. uwharrie, which features an acute angle rather than a tubercle at this junction.

== Ecology ==
The species A. corrugata is usually found in mesic habitats such as deciduous forests. This millipede can also be found in mixed forests or in groves of rhododendron. This species has been found living among sugar maple, tulip poplar, white oak, pine, beech, hickory, and black walnut trees. This millipede is typically found under decaying leaves, logs, or stones, but sometimes can also be observed walking on leaf litter in the forest.

This millipede is one of three polydesmid species known to be a host for the parasite Arthrophaga myriapodina, a fungus in the order Entomophthorales. Although the species A. corrugata normally remains hidden in leaf litter or soil, this parasite causes an infected millipede to climb to a higher exposed location, such as the elevated end of a fallen branch or the top of a fence post, before dying. After the parasite kills its host, the fungus erupts from between the body segments of the millipede to discharge conidia (spores). The elevated location allows the fungus to disperse its spores over a wider area. This fungus is known to infect millipedes in the eastern part of the range of A. corrugata, including Virginia, Washington, D.C., Maryland, Pennsylvania, New York, Massachusetts, and southern Ontario.
