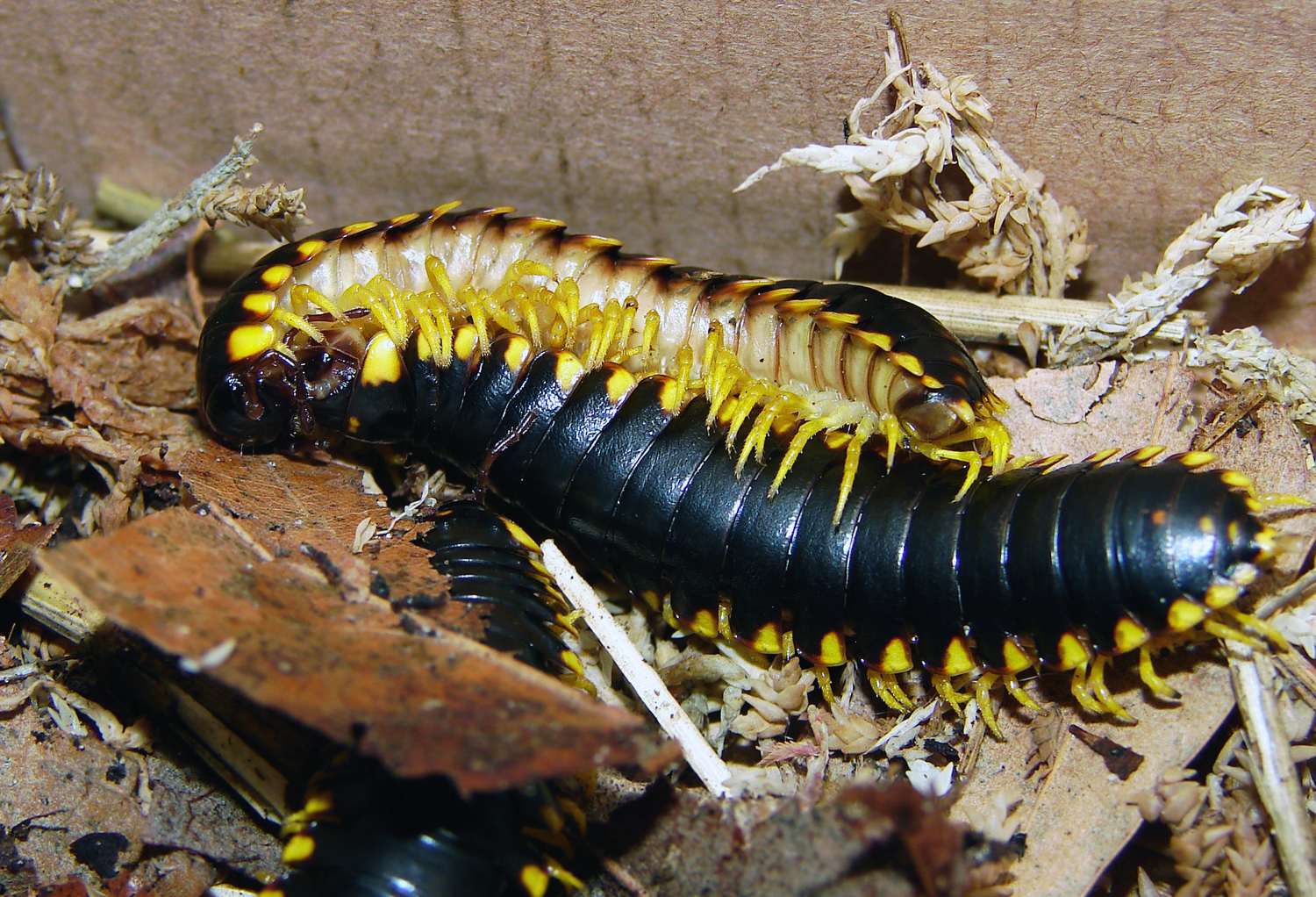
- Mating pair in captivity

Scientific classification
- Kingdom: Animalia
- Phylum: Arthropoda
- Subphylum: Myriapoda
- Class: Diplopoda
- Order: Polydesmida
- Family: Xystodesmidae
- Genus: Apheloria
- Species: A. tigana

Binomial name
- Apheloria tigana Chamberlin, 1939

Synonyms
- Apheloria aspila Chamberlin, 1939; Apheloria waccamana Chamberlin, 1940

= Apheloria tigana =

Species of millipede

Apheloria tigana, also known as the yellow and black flat millipede, is a large North American flat-backed millipede in the family Xystodesmidae. This millipede secretes cyanide compounds as a defense. Authorities recommend washing hands after handling these millipedes as these secreted compounds are toxic and can cause irritation if rubbed in the eyes.

Characteristics include yellow paranota (lateral segmental expansions on the dorsa), a yellow mid-dorsal spot on the anterior margin of the collum or first segment, and yellow mid-dorsal spots on the last three to five segments. South of the Cape Fear River basin there is an undescribed Apheloria species with yellow middorsal marks on most segments.

This millipede is found from coastal southeastern North Carolina to the Blue Ridge Mountains in Franklin and Floyd counties in Virginia.

Although A. tigana was once accepted as a valid species, in 2017, authorities deemed A. tigana to be a junior synonym of another species of Apheloria, A. virginiensis, based on the morphology of these millipedes. In 2025, a phylogenetic analysis of the genus Apheloria using molecular data confirmed this proposed synonymy, finding A. tigana to be the same species as A. virginiensis.
