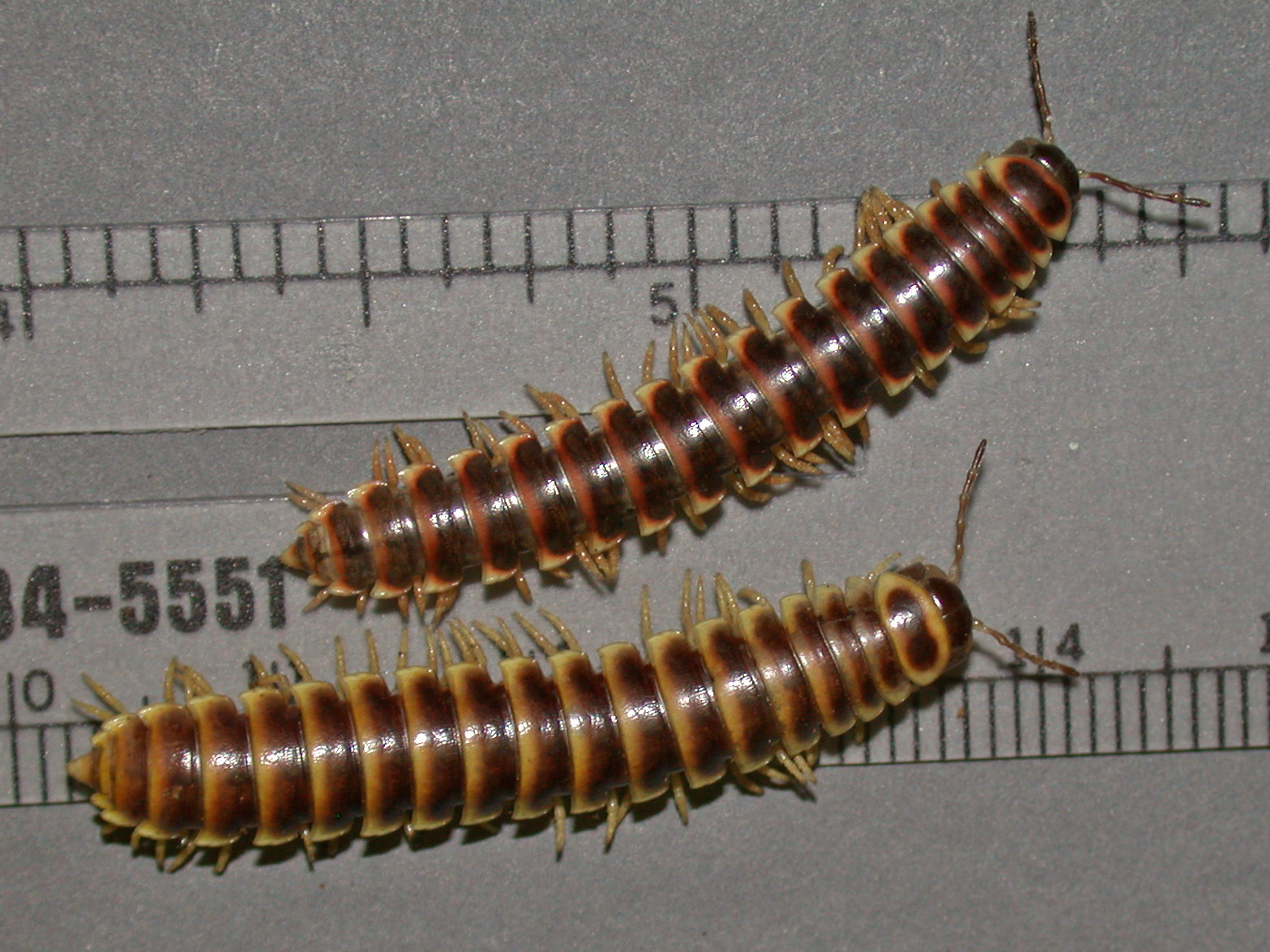
- Male (top) and female (bottom) wandering cherry millipedes, Pleuroloma flavipes

Scientific classification
- Kingdom: Animalia
- Phylum: Arthropoda
- Subphylum: Myriapoda
- Class: Diplopoda
- Order: Polydesmida
- Family: Xystodesmidae
- Genus: Pleuroloma
- Species: P. flavipes

Binomial name
- Pleuroloma flavipes Rafinesque, 1820

= Pleuroloma flavipes =

Species of millipede

Pleuroloma flavipes, commonly known as the traveling cherry millipede, is a species of flat-backed millipede in the family Xystodesmidae. It has the widest distribution of any species of xystodesmid millipede and is found in eastern North America from southeastern North Dakota, eastward to Connecticut, and southward to North Carolina, northern Louisiana, and southern Texas. Pleuroloma flavipes millipedes are occasionally observed in large aggregations of individuals where they appear to move en masse in a certain direction, hence the common name "wandering cherry millipede". In a report from 1950, an aggregation of about 6,000 individuals were encountered on a single bridge at McCormick's Creek State Park, Indiana. The species is extremely variable in coloration, and converges in appearance with several species of Apheloria and Brachoria as a result of mimicry.

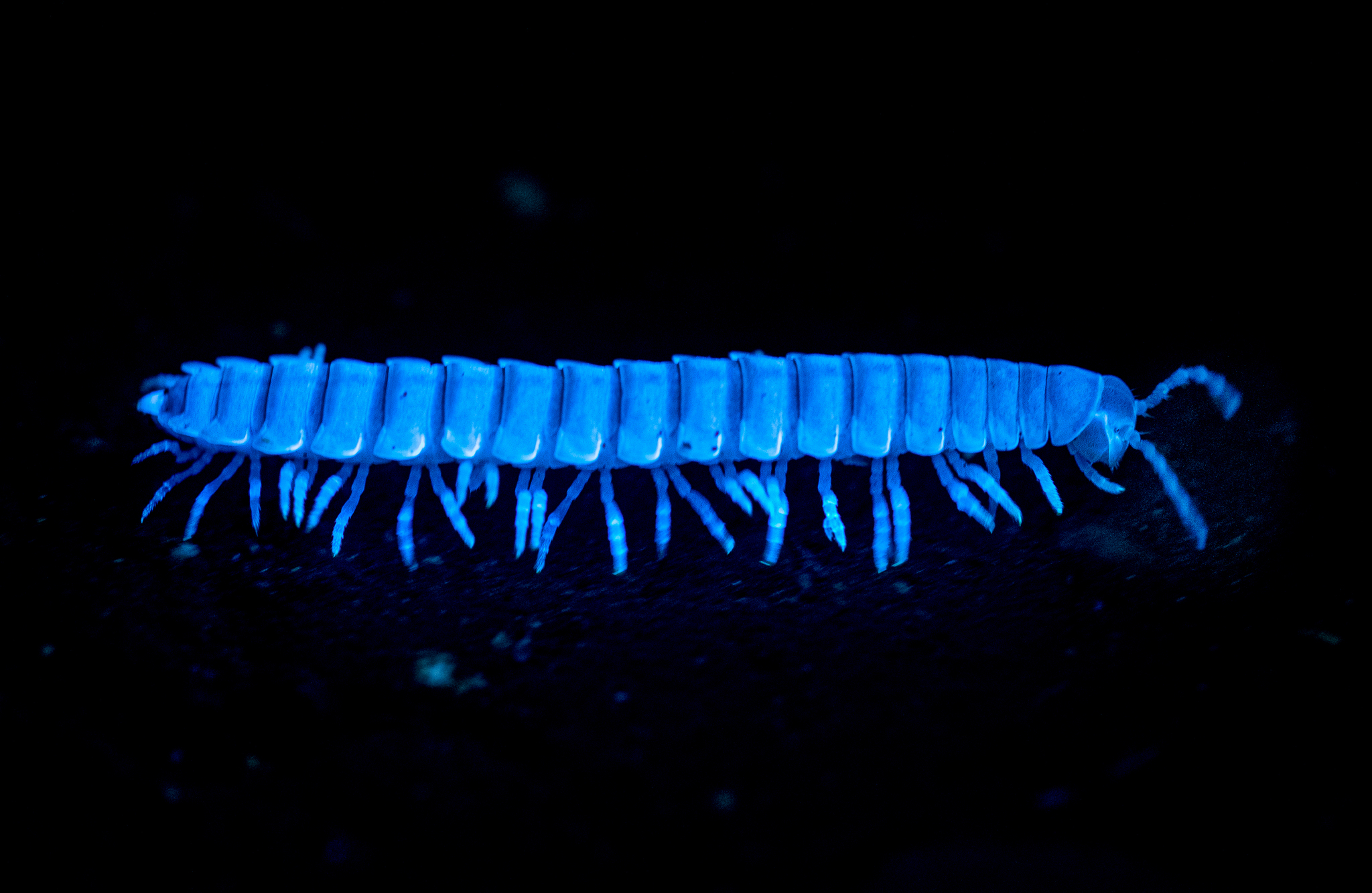
Pleuroloma flavipes fluorescing under 365 nanometer ultraviolet light
