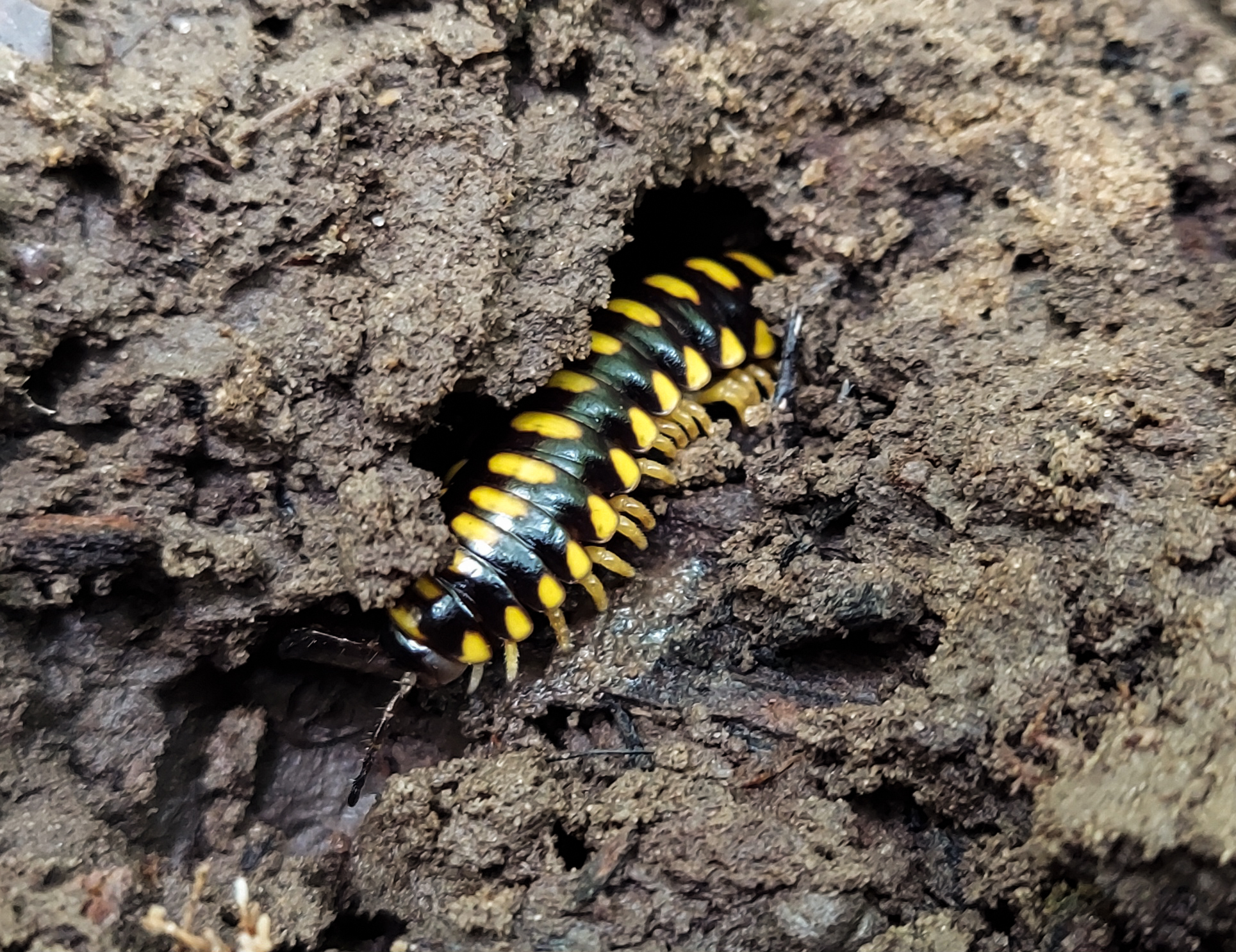
- Brachoria insolita, Virginia

Scientific classification
- Domain: Eukaryota
- Kingdom: Animalia
- Phylum: Arthropoda
- Subphylum: Myriapoda
- Class: Diplopoda
- Order: Polydesmida
- Family: Xystodesmidae
- Subfamily: Rhysodesminae
- Tribe: Apheloriini
- Genus: Brachoria; Chamberlin, 1939

Synonyms
- Tucoria Chamberlin, 1943; Anfractogon Hoffman, 1948

= Brachoria =

Genus of millipedes

Brachoria is a genus of polydesmidan millipedes in the family Xystodesmidae inhabiting the Eastern United States. Also known as the Appalachian mimic millipedes, at least 30 species are known, with highest diversity in the Appalachian Mountains, especially the Cumberland Plateau and Ridge and Valley Province.

Species of Brachoria are boldly patterned with yellow, orange, red, violet that contrasts with a black background, and in the Appalachians some species mimic species of Apheloria where they co-occur, a phenomenon known as Müllerian mimicry

== Species ==
There are over 30 species of Brachoria which differ mainly in characteristics of the male gonopods (reproductive appendages), but since many species have very small known ranges, geographic location can aid in identification as well.

These species belong to the genus Brachoria:

- Brachoria abbreviata (Shelley, 1986)
- Brachoria badbranchensis Marek, 2010
- Brachoria blackmountainensis Marek, 2010
- Brachoria calceata (Causey, 1955)
- Brachoria campcreekensis Marek, 2010
- Brachoria camptera Means, Hennen & Marek, 2021
- Brachoria cedra Keeton, 1959
- Brachoria conta Keeton, 1965
- Brachoria cryocybe Hennen, Means & Marek, 2021
- Brachoria cumberlandmountainensis Marek, 2010
- Brachoria dentata Keeton, 1959
- Brachoria divicuma Keeton, 1965
- Brachoria electa Causey, 1955
- Brachoria enodicuma Keeton, 1965
- Brachoria evides (Bollman, 1887)
- Brachoria flammipes Marek, 2010
- Brachoria forficata (Shelley, 1986)
- Brachoria glendalea (Chamberlin, 1918)
- Brachoria gracilipes (Chamberlin, 1947)
- Brachoria grapevinensis Marek, 2010
- Brachoria guntermountainensis Marek, 2010
- Brachoria hansonia Causey, 1950
- Brachoria hendrixsoni Marek, 2010
- Brachoria hoffmani Keeton, 1959
- Brachoria hubrichti Keeton, 1959
- Brachoria indianae (Bollman, 1888)
- Brachoria initialis Chamberlin, 1939
- Brachoria insolita Keeton, 1959
- Brachoria kentuckiana (Causey, 1942)
- Brachoria laminata Keeton, 1959
- Brachoria ligula Keeton, 1959
- Brachoria mendota Keeton, 1959
- Brachoria ochra (Chamberlin, 1918)
- Brachoria platana Means, Hennen & Marek, 2021
- Brachoria plecta Keeton, 1959
- Brachoria sheari Marek, 2010
- Brachoria splendida (Causey, 1942)
- Brachoria virginia Marek, 2010
- Brachoria viridicolens (Hoffman, 1948)

== Gallery ==
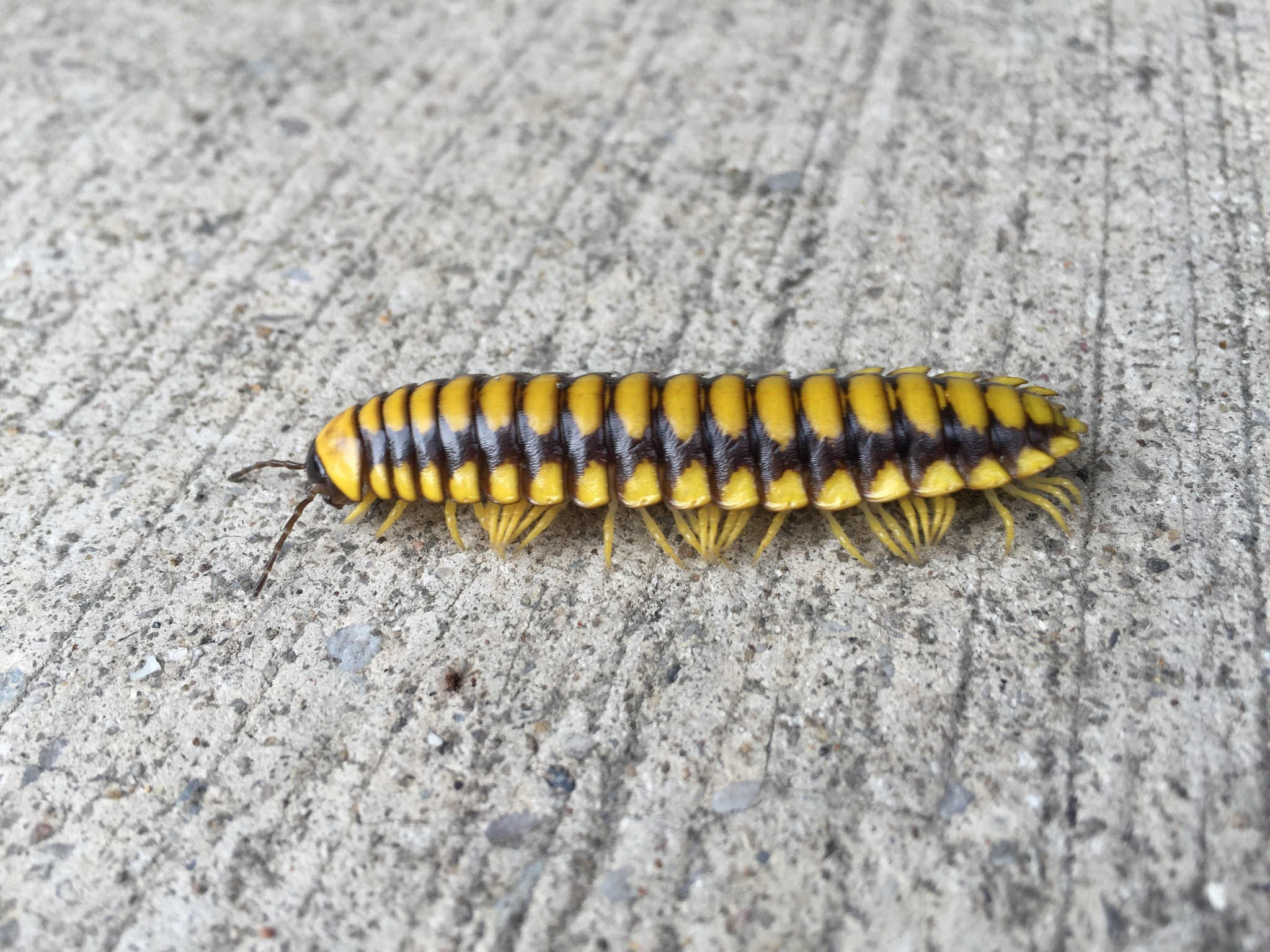
Brachoria dentata, Tennessee

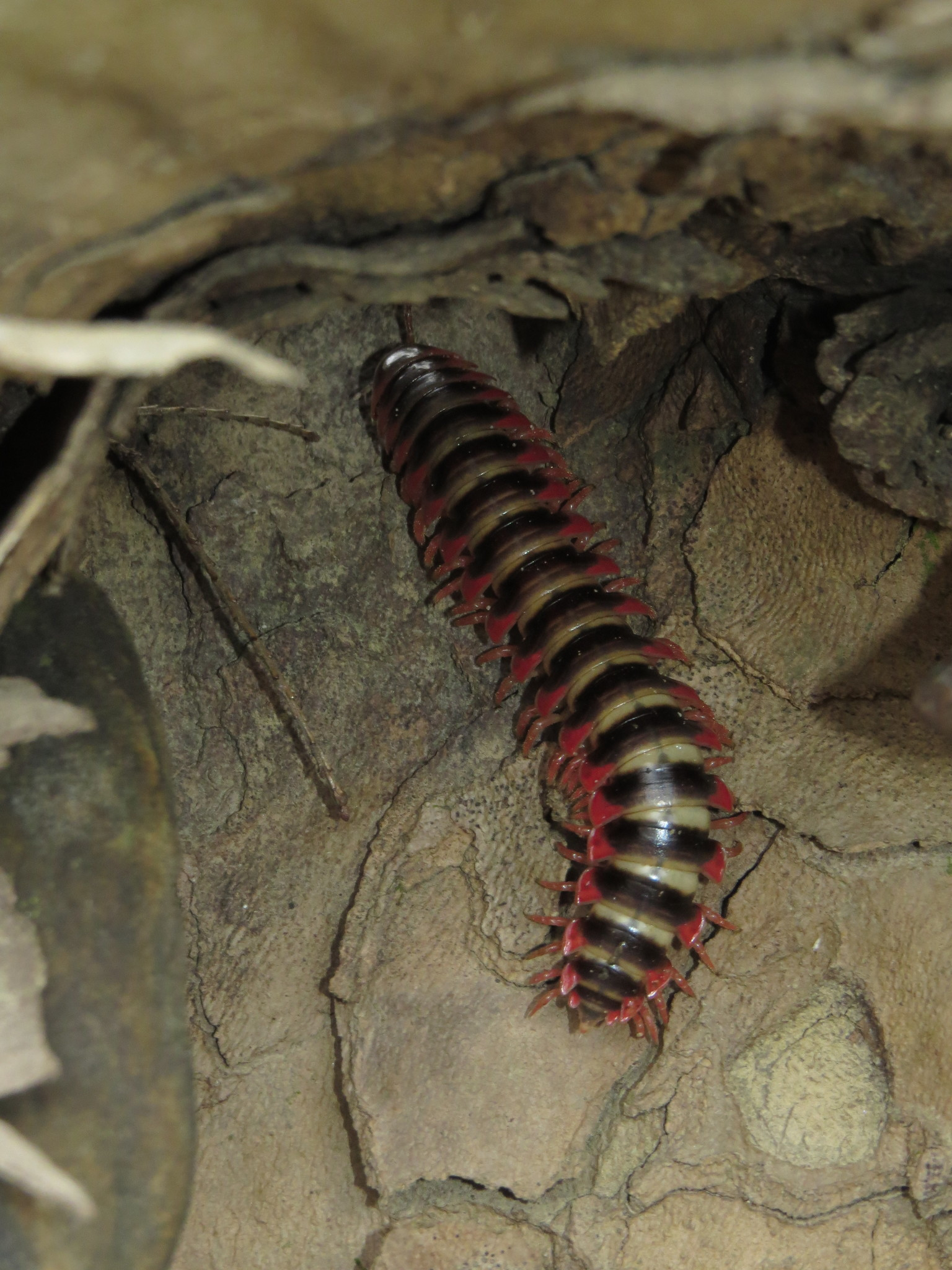
Brachoria forficata, Tennessee

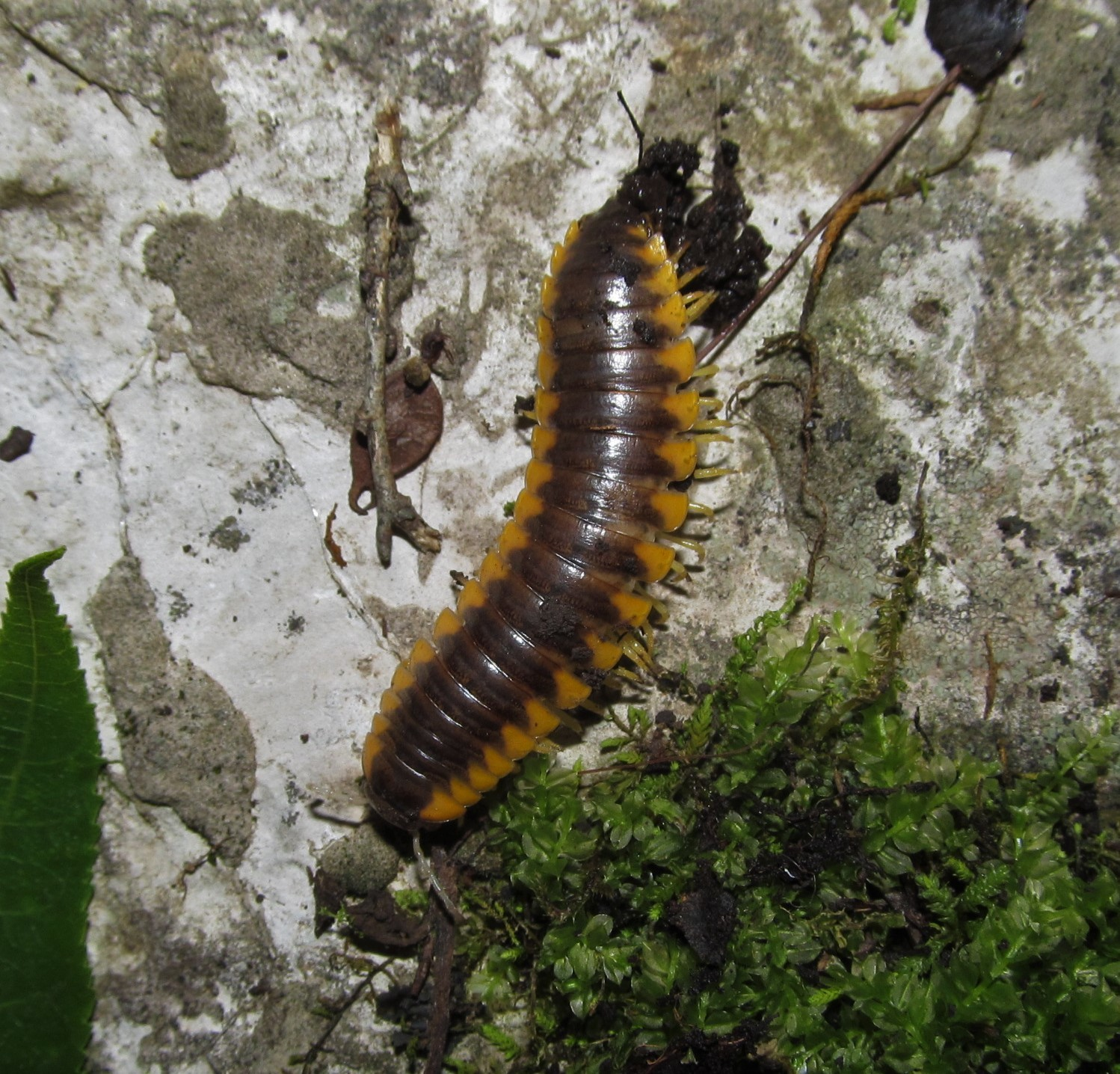
Brachoria glendalea, Tennessee

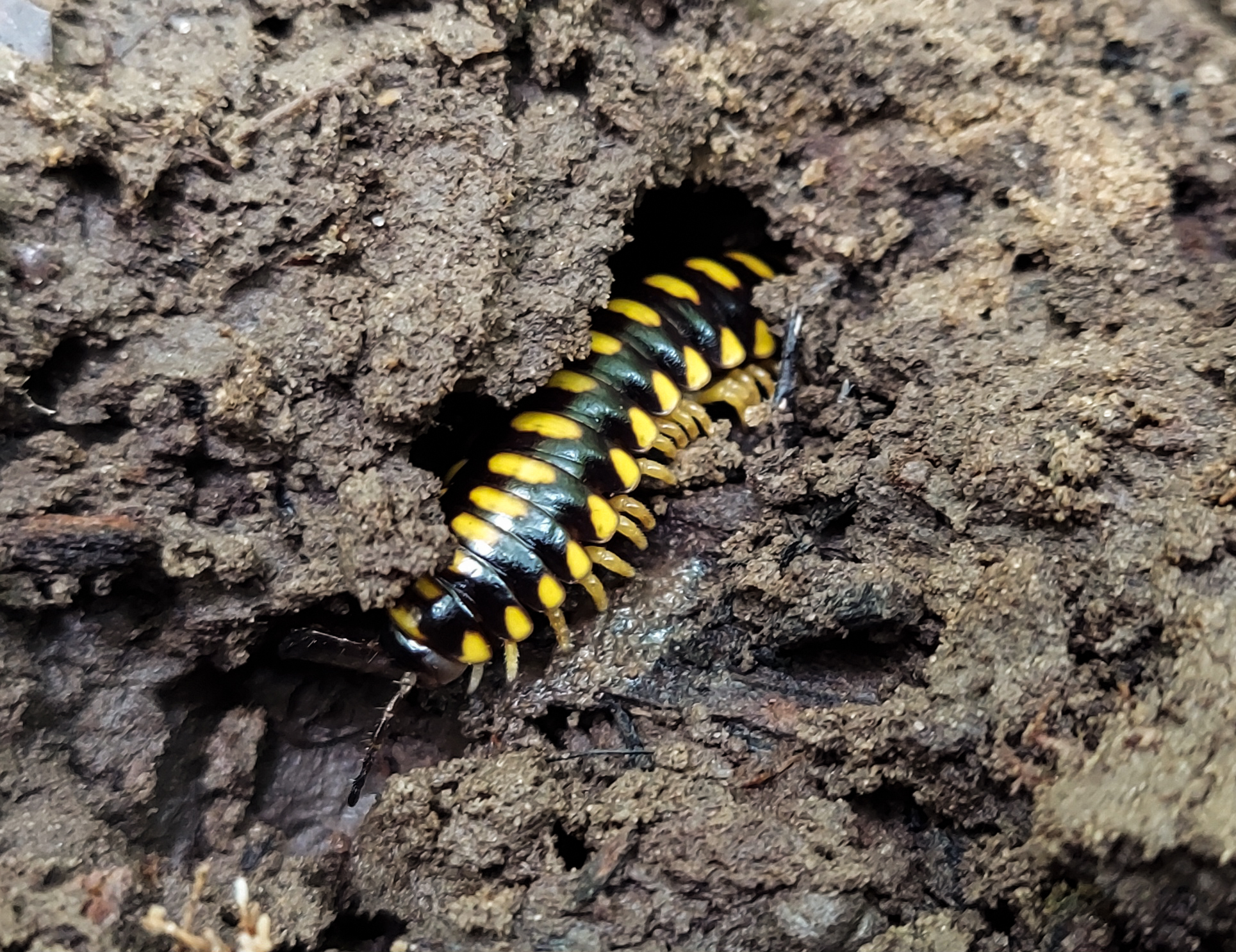
Brachoria insolita, Virginia

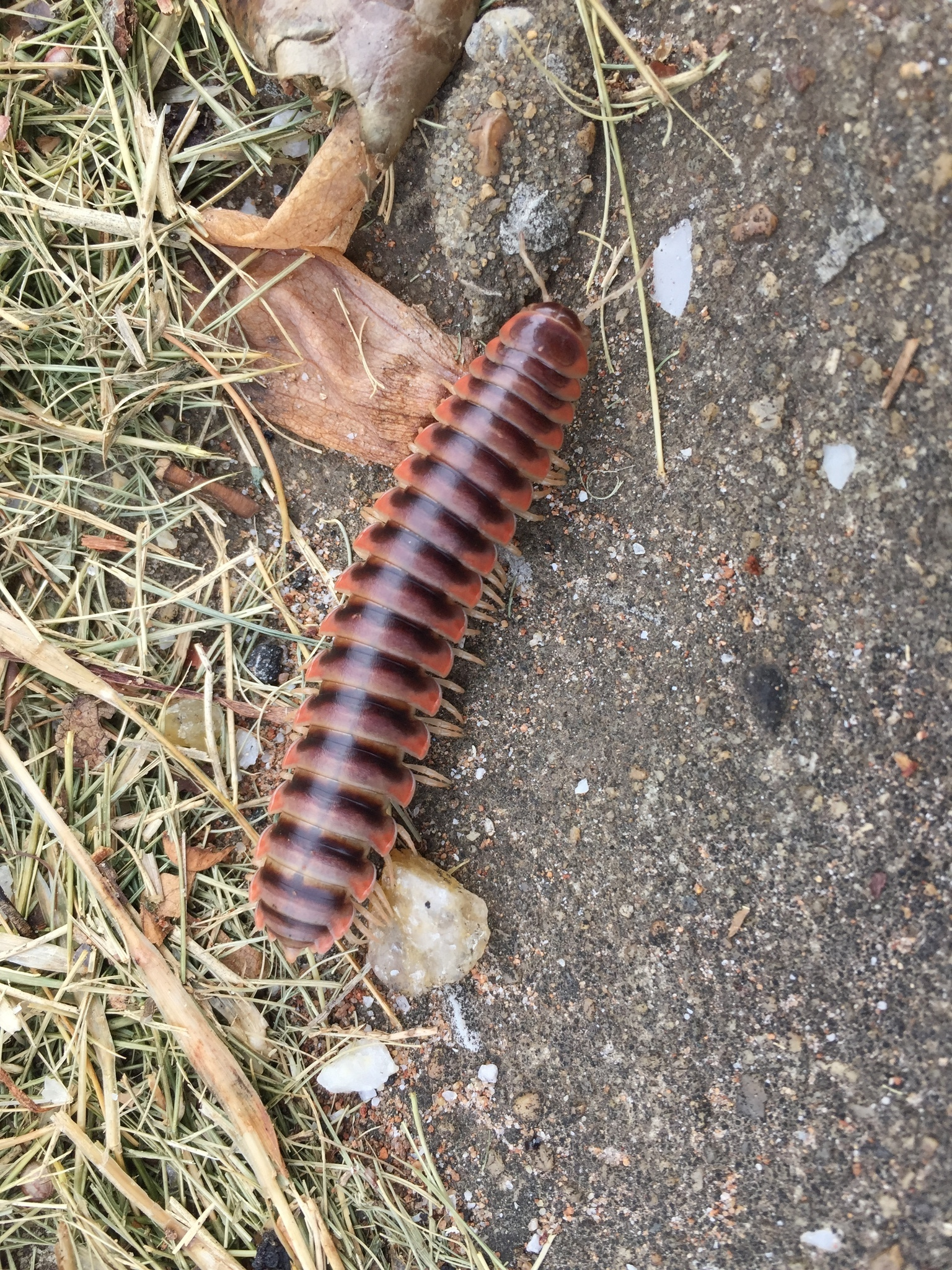
Brachoria ochra, Alabama
