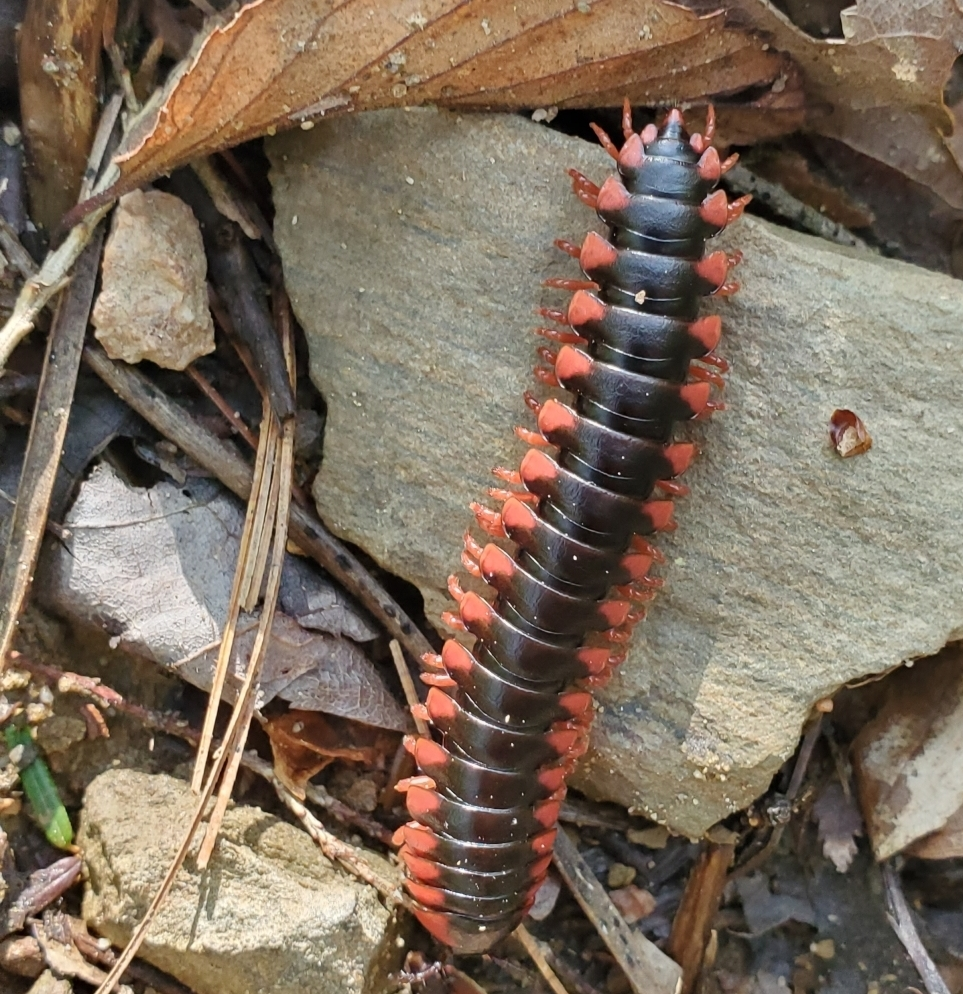
- Rudiloria kleinpeteri, Virginia

Scientific classification
- Kingdom: Animalia
- Phylum: Arthropoda
- Subphylum: Myriapoda
- Class: Diplopoda
- Order: Polydesmida
- Family: Xystodesmidae
- Tribe: Apheloriini
- Genus: Rudiloria; Causey, 1955

= Rudiloria =

Genus of millipedes

Rudiloria is a genus of millipedes in the family Xystodesmidae, found in eastern North America.

== Species ==
These species belong to the genus Rudiloria:

- Rudiloria charityae Marek, 2021
- Rudiloria guyandotta (Shear, 1972)
- Rudiloria kleinpeteri (Hoffman, 1949)
- Rudiloria mohicana Causey, 1955
- Rudiloria rigida (Shelley, 1986)
- Rudiloria trimaculata (Wood, 1864)
- Rudiloria tortua (Chamberlin, 1949)
