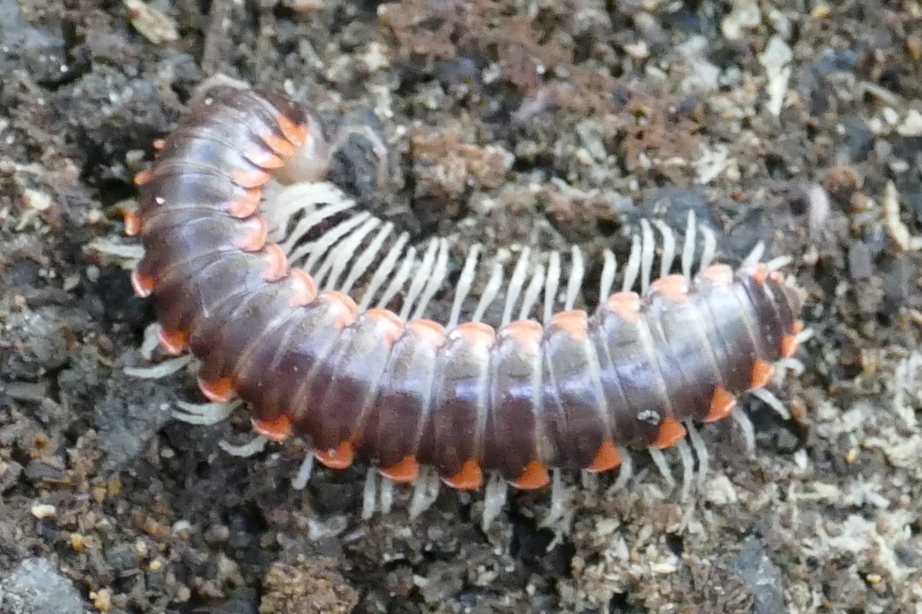

Scientific classification
- Kingdom: Animalia
- Phylum: Arthropoda
- Subphylum: Myriapoda
- Class: Diplopoda
- Order: Polydesmida
- Family: Xystodesmidae
- Genus: Howellaria
- Species: H. infesta

Binomial name
- Howellaria infesta (Chamberlin, 1918)

= Howellaria infesta =

Species of millipede

Howellaria infesta is a species of flat-backed millipede in the family Xystodesmidae. It is found in North America.
