= The Cedars Natural Area Preserve =

Nature preserve in Virginia, US

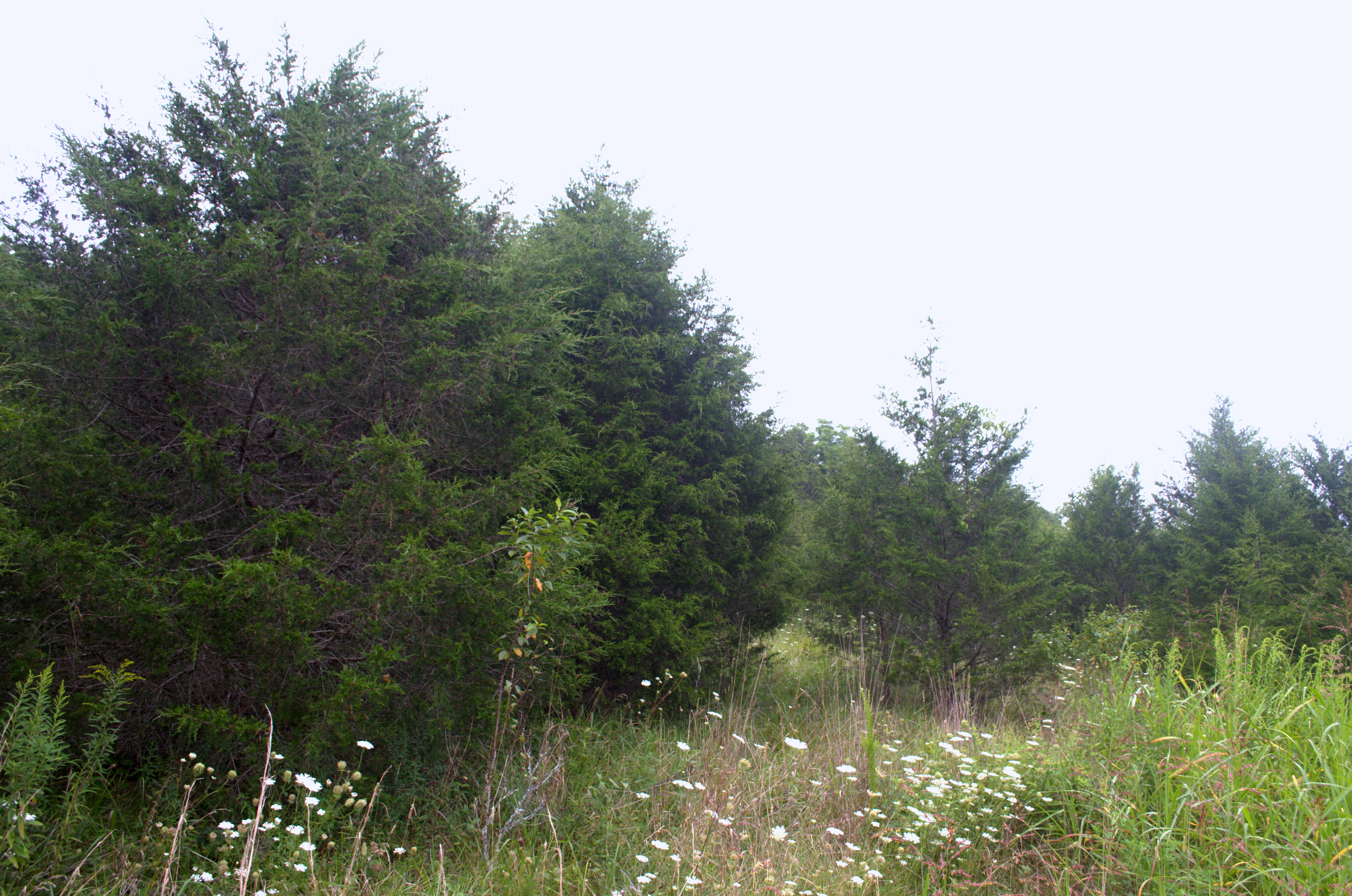
- Cedars with some prairie plants in the foreground at The Cedars Natural Area Preserve

- Location within Virginia
- Location: Lee County, Virginia
- Coordinates: 36°40′N 83°10′W
- Area: 2,265 acres (9.17 km^{2})
- Governing body: Virginia Department of Conservation and Recreation

The Cedars Natural Area Preserve is a Natural Area Preserve located in Lee County, Virginia. It protects rare plant and animal species adapted to the unique conditions of a karst landscape.

== History ==
The Cedars Natural Area Preserve began as a 50-acre (0.20 km^{2}) procurement by The Nature Conservancy in 1996. The following year, the land was transferred to the Virginia Department of Conservation and Recreation to be managed as a Natural Area Preserve. Additional lands were added to the preserve in the ensuing years. In 2015, a state grant provided $317,711 to expand the preserve through purchase of an additional 150 acres (0.61 km^{2}), including 6,170 feet (1,880 m) of frontage along the Powell River.

== Description ==
The Cedars Natural Area Preserve is located in Lee County near the Powell River, within a 30-to-40-square-mile (78 to 104 km^{2}) region of karst landscape that is known as "The Cedars". The limestone bedrock in such karst regions is easily eroded, leading to thin soils, sinkholes, caves, and losing streams. The 2,265-acre (9.17 km^{2}) preserve's glades and woodlands comprise a rocky and rugged landscape that serves as a haven for numerous rare plants adapted to the habitat. The preserve also protects habitat for the loggerhead shrike, a rare bird within Virginia, and the endangered Lee County cave isopod, Lirceus usdagalun.

Regionally rare plants found within the preserve include:

- Wild hyacinth (Camassia scilloides)
- Crawe's sedge (Carex crawei)
- Mullien Foxglove (Dasistoma macrophylla)
- Ringed panic grass (Dichanthelium annulum)
- Flattened spikerush (Eleocharis compressa var. compressa)
- Northern rattlesnake-master (Eryngium yuccifolium var. yuccifolium)
- Pink thoroughwort (Fleischmannia incarnata)
- Canada bluets (Houstonia canadensis)
- Rattlesnake-master (Manfreda virginica)
- Pitcher's stitchwort (Minuartia patula)
- Yarrow-leaved ragwort (Packera millefolium)
- White blue-eyed grass (Sisyrinchium albidum)
- Tall dropseed (Sporobolus compositus var. compositus)
- Ozark dropseed (Sporobolus ozarkanus)
- Running glade clover (Trifolium calcaricum)

=== Public access ===
The preserve is owned and maintained by the Virginia Department of Conservation and Recreation. It does not include improvements for public access, and visitors must make arrangements with a state-employed land steward prior to visiting.

== See also ==
- List of Virginia Natural Area Preserves
