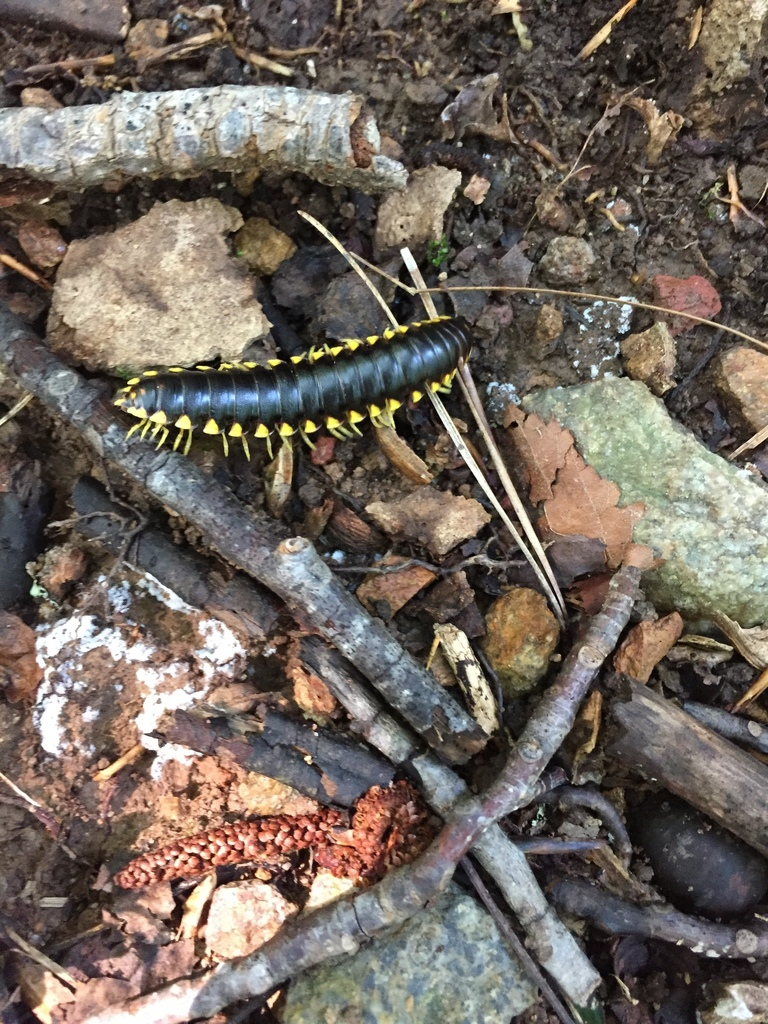

Scientific classification
- Kingdom: Animalia
- Phylum: Arthropoda
- Subphylum: Myriapoda
- Class: Diplopoda
- Order: Polydesmida
- Family: Xystodesmidae
- Genus: Apheloria
- Species: A. virginiensis

Binomial name
- Apheloria virginiensis (Drury, 1770)

Synonyms
- Julus virginiensis Drury, 1770; Apheloria tigana Chamberlin, 1939; Apheloria virginia Chamberlin, 1939; Apheloria waccamana Chamberlin, 1940

= Apheloria virginiensis =

Species of millipede

Apheloria virginiensis is a species of flat-backed millipede in the family Xystodesmidae. Also known as the Virginia cherry millipede, this species is found in Virginia and North Carolina. This millipede secretes hydrogen cyanide and benzaldehyde as a defense mechanism, and these compounds smell like cherries or almonds. Although this species secretes too little toxin to be hazardous to humans, authorities recommend washing hands after handling this millipede. Although this millipede is sometimes called the yellow and black flat millipede, this species also includes color patterns that feature pink or orange instead of yellow. This species is large and can reach two inches in length.

== Discovery ==
This millipede is notable as the first myriapod to be described from North America. This species was first described in 1770 by the British zoologist Dru Drury. He based the original description of this species on specimens he received from Didwiddie County in Virginia.

== Taxonomy and phylogeny ==
In 1999, the American zoologist Richard L. Hoffman revised this species, originally named Julus virginiensis, under the name Apheloria virginiensis. Hoffman deemed four other millipedes in the genus Apheloria, including A. corrugata, to be four different subspecies of A. virginiensis. Although Hoffman treated the millipede A. tigana as a separate species of Apheloria, in 2017, other authorities deemed A. tigana to be a junior synonym of A. virginiensis based on the morphology of these millipedes.

In 2025, a phylogenetic analysis of the genus Apheloria using molecular data found A. corrugata to be a species distinct from the species A. virginiensis. This analysis also finds the other three subspecies proposed by Hoffman to be junior synonyms of A. corrugata instead. This analysis also confirms that A. tigana is a junior synonym of A. virginiensis. The molecular evidence places A. virginiensis in a clade with two other species of Apheloria, A. montana and A. polychroma, which form a sister group and emerge as the closest relatives of A. virginiensis. This evidence indicates that the species A. corrugata is a more distant relative, placing A. corrugata in a different clade on a separate branch of a phylogenetic tree of the genus Apheloria.

== Distribution ==
The species A. virginiensis is known mainly from the piedmont and coastal plain in North Carolina, but its range also extends into southern Virginia. In North Carolina, this millipede is often found in parks in the Research Triangle area, including William B. Umstead State Park. In Virginia, the range of this species extends into the Blue Ridge Mountains, piedmont, and coastal plain, reaching as far north as Hampden-Sydney College in Prince Edward County. This range extends as far west as the Blue Ridge Mountains in Floyd County in Virginia and Wilkes County in North Carolina.

== Description ==
This large species can range from 27 mm to 59 mm in length and exhibits sexual dimorphism in size, with females typically larger than males. This species displays a variety of color patterns, but the most common pattern is a black dorsal surface with yellow spots on the paranota and yellow legs. Another common pattern adds a third spot in the middle of each metazonite and in the middle of the collum. In another three-spotted pattern, the spots on the paranota are pink, but the legs and the spots down the middle of the back are yellow. Less common variations are a two-spotted pattern with orange spots on the paranota and orange legs and a three-spotted pattern with pink legs and pink spots.

Like most species in the order Polydesmida, this species features 20 segments in adults, counting the collum as the first and the telson as the last. Accordingly, as in most polydesmid species, adult females feature 31 pairs of legs, whereas adult males feature only 30 leg pairs, excluding leg pair 8, which become a pair of gonopods in adult males. As in most species of Apheloria, the distal part of each gonopod (acropodite) in this species is uniformly narrow and curved into a circular shape, and the more proximal part (prefemur) features a projection shaped like a scythe.

This species can be distinguished from other species of Apheloria, however, based on features of the gonopods. For example, the species A. virginiensis could be confused in the field with the species A. corrugata where the ranges of these two species overlap in southern Virginia. The acropodite, however, is smoothly circular in A. corrugata but features a distinct bend like an elbow in A. virginiensis. This elbow also distinguishes A. virginiensis from its close relatives A. montana and A. polychroma, which each feature acropodites that are smoothly circular. Furthermore, the junction of the acropodite and the prefemur features a distinct tubercle in A. virginiensis but features an acute angle instead in A. polychroma.

== Ecology ==
The species A. virginiensis is usually found in mesic habitats such as deciduous forests. This millipede can also be found in mixed forests or in sandy soil. This species has been found living among pine, birch, beech, maple, oak, sweet gum, walnut, magnolia, hickory, rhododendron, tulip poplar, and cherry trees. This millipede is typically found under decaying leaves or logs, often next to streams and sandy woods, but sometimes can also be observed walking on leaf litter or trails after dark. Adults of this species spend much of their time feeding on leaf litter and rotting wood from conifers as well as deciduous trees, whereas juveniles feed on humus. These millipedes digest dead leaves and excrete fecal pellets, thereby contributing to the transformation of leaf litter into humus.

== Reproduction and life cycle ==
Females of this species lay their eggs in a protected location with moisture and a ready food supply for newly hatched young, often under a log. After three or more weeks of incubation, the young hatch as pale juveniles with fewer segments and legs than adults. As juveniles grow and molt repeatedly, they become darker with brighter spots, adding segments and legs with each molt until emerging as a mature adult. The life span for this species is two or three years.
