= Taylor Swift (disambiguation) =

Taylor Swift (born 1989) is an American singer-songwriter.

Taylor Swift may also refer to:

- Taylor Swift: The Eras Tour, a 2023 American concert film
- Taylor Swift (album), a 2006 album by Taylor Swift
- Taylor Swift Productions, the media company of Taylor Swift

== See also ==
- "Tailor Swif", a 2024 single by ASAP Rocky
- Nannaria swiftae, millipede named in honor of Taylor Swift
- Castianeira swiftay, spider named in honor of Taylor Swift
