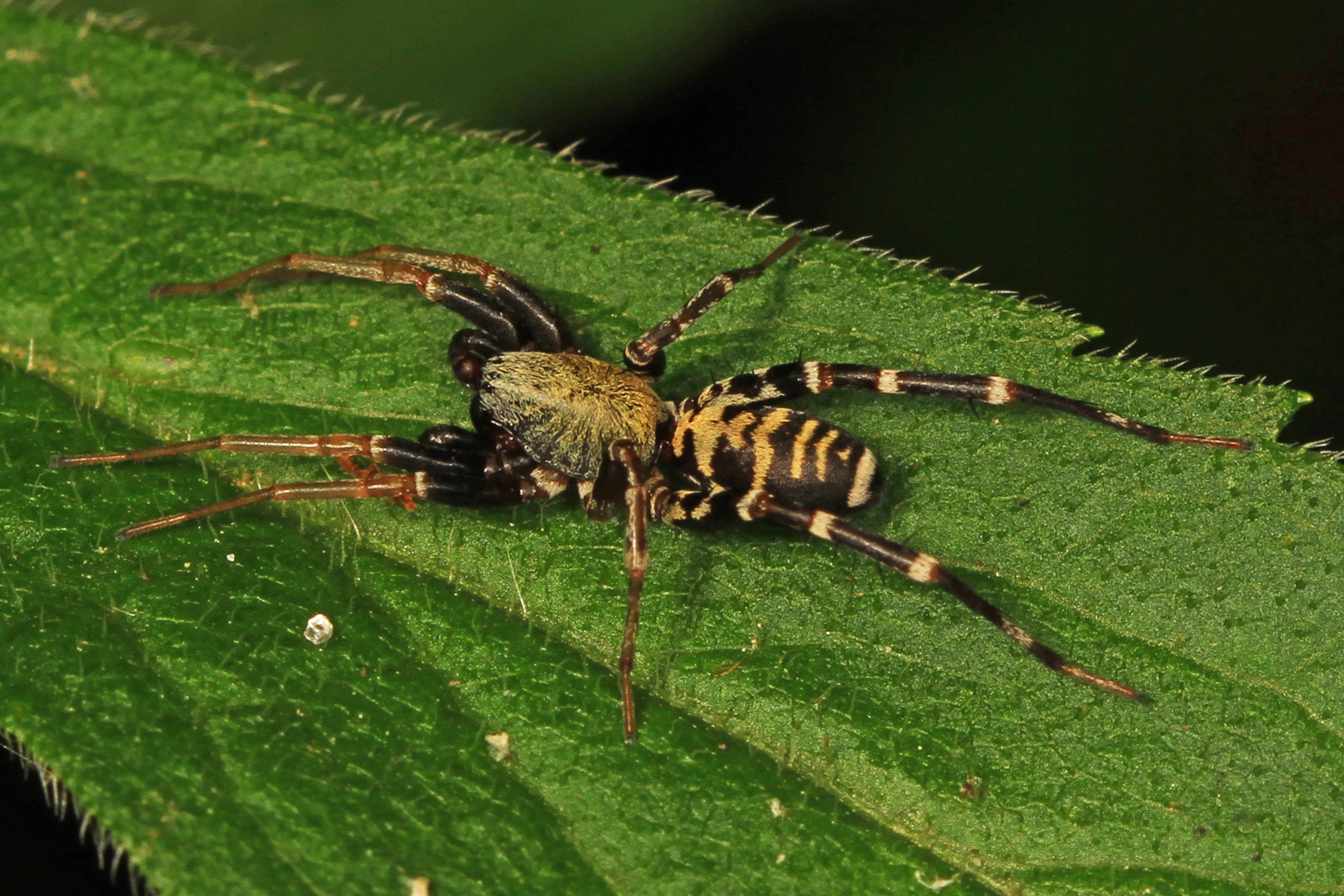
- Castianeira longipalpa in Maryland, United States

Scientific classification
- Kingdom: Animalia
- Phylum: Arthropoda
- Subphylum: Chelicerata
- Class: Arachnida
- Order: Araneae
- Infraorder: Araneomorphae
- Family: Corinnidae
- Genus: Castianeira; Keyserling, 1879

Type species
- C. rubicunda Keyserling, 1879

Species
- 127, see text

Synonyms
- Geotrecha Emerton, 1890; Micariaulax Becker, 1879; Pedo O. Pickard-Cambridge, 1896; Thargalia Karsch, 1880; Tylophora Pavesi, 1880

= Castianeira =

Castianeira Temporal range: Neogene–present

Genus of spiders

Castianeira is a genus of ant-like corinnid sac spiders first described by Eugen von Keyserling in 1879. They are found in Eurasia, Africa, and the Americas, but are absent from Australia. Twenty-six species are native to North America, and at least twice as many are native to Mexico and Central America.

The genus name Castianeira is treated as a proper noun in the original description, likely derived from the Greek mythological figure Kastianeira, who was described as the mother of Gorgythion in Homer’s Iliad. No explicit etymology was provided by Keyserling. This follows the convention of naming genera after classical names without reference to morphological characteristics.

== Description ==
Spiders of this genus have eight eyes in two procurved rows (meaning that the lateral eyes are farther toward the front of the body than the medial eyes), the upper row slightly wider than the lower row. This distinguishes them from species of Micaria that almost always have straight rows of eyes. The opisthosoma is not constricted, and has an elongate to oval shape to mimic that of ants. In addition to the ant-like coloration, the abdomen has white scale-like setae. The rear pair of legs are the longest, and the front pair are second longest.

== Mimicry ==
Some species are ant mimics resembling specific groups of ants, while others only have generic body modifications to look more ant-like, such as an elongated body or a carapace pattern that creates the illusion of a third body segment. Some mimic ant behavior as well, waving their front two legs as if they were antennae or bobbing their abdomen to look more ant-like. Certain species found in Texas mimic fire ants to prey on them, while some species use Batesian mimicry, appearing like velvet ants to take advantage of their aposematism in order to deter predators.

=== Ant mimicry ===
Known ant-spider mimicry:

- Castianeira cingulata – short carpenter ants
- Castianeira longipalpa – myrmicine or ponerine ants
- Castianeira memnonia – Pachycondyla obscuricornis Emery
- Castianeira rica – Atta sp, Odontomachus sp, and others
- Castianeira trilineata – reddish carpenter ants (Latreille)

== Species ==
As of April 2019 it contains 127 species:

- C. abuelita Reiskind, 1969 – Panama
- C. adhartali Gajbe, 2003 – India
- C. alata Muma, 1945 – New England, US
- C. alba Reiskind, 1969 – Costa Rica, Panama
- C. albivulvae Mello-Leitão, 1922 – Brazil
- C. albomaculata Berland, 1922 – Kenya
- C. albopicta Gravely, 1931 – India
- C. alfa Reiskind, 1969 – Southern California and Arizona
- C. alteranda Gertsch, 1942 – Central US, Canada (Saskatchewan and British Columbia)
- C. amiantis Butt & Beg, 2001 – Pakistan
- C. amoena (C. L. Koch, 1841) – US, Mexico
- C. antinorii (Pavesi, 1880) – Algeria, Tunisia, Sudan, Egypt
- C. arcistriata Yin, Xie, Gong & Kim, 1996 – China
- C. argentina Mello-Leitão, 1942 – Argentina
- C. arnoldii Charitonov, 1946 – Iran, Turkmenistan, Uzbekistan
- C. athena Reiskind, 1969 – Southern California, Mexico
- C. atypica Mello-Leitão, 1929 – Brazil
- C. azteca Reiskind, 1969 – Mexico
- C. badia (Simon, 1877) – Portugal, Spain
- C. bartholini Simon, 1901 – East Africa
- C. bengalensis Biswas, 1984 – India
- C. bicolor (Simon, 1890) – East Africa
- C. brevis Keyserling, 1891 – Brazil
- C. brunellii Caporiacco, 1940 – Ethiopia
- C. buelowae Mello-Leitão, 1946 – Paraguay
- C. carvalhoi Mello-Leitão, 1947 – Brazil
- C. cecchii (Pavesi, 1883) – Ethiopia, East Africa
- C. chrysura Mello-Leitão, 1943 – Brazil
- C. cincta (Banks, 1929) – Panama
- C. cingulata (C. L. Koch, 1841) – US, Canada
- C. claveroensis Mello-Leitão, 1943 – Argentina
- C. coquito Rubio, Zapata & Grismado, 2015 – Argentina
- C. crocata (Hentz, 1847) – US
- C. crucigera (Hentz, 1847) – US
- C. cubana (Banks, 1926) – Cuba, Panama, US (Southern tip of Texas and Florida)
- C. cyclindracea Simon, 1896 – Brazil
- C. daoxianensis Yin, Xie, Gong & Kim, 1996 – China
- C. delicatula Simon, 1910 – Sierra Leone
- C. dentata Chickering, 1937 – Panama
- C. descripta (Hentz, 1847) – Eastern US, Canada
- C. dorsata (Banks, 1898) – Southern Arizona, Mexico
- C. drassodidoides Strand, 1915 – Israel
- C. dubia (O. Pickard-Cambridge, 1898) – Mexico to Panama
- C. dubia Mello-Leitão, 1922 – Brazil
- C. dugesi (Becker, 1879) – Mexico
- C. flavimaculata Hu, Song & Zheng, 1985 – China
- C. flavipatellata Yin, Xie, Gong & Kim, 1996 – China
- C. flebilis O. Pickard-Cambridge, 1898 – Mexico
- C. floridana (Banks, 1904) – Florida, Cuba
- C. formosula Simon, 1910 – Equatorial Guinea (Bioko)
- C. furva Sankaran, Malamel, Joseph & Sebastian, 2015 – India
- C. fusconigra Berland, 1922 – Kenya
- C. gaucha Mello-Leitão, 1943 – Brazil
- C. gertschi Kaston, 1945 – US, Canada
- C. guapa Reiskind, 1969 – Panama
- C. himalayensis Gravely, 1931 – India
- C. hongkong Song, Zhu & Wu, 1997 – China
- C. indica Tikader, 1981 – India
- C. inquinata (Thorell, 1890) – Indonesia (Sumatra)
- C. insulicola Strand, 1916 – East Africa
- C. isophthalma Mello-Leitão, 1930 – Brazil
- C. lachrymosa (O. Pickard-Cambridge, 1898) – Mexico
- C. leptopoda Mello-Leitão, 1929 – Brazil
- C. littoralis Mello-Leitão, 1926 – Brazil
- C. longipalpa (Hentz, 1847) – US, Canada
- C. luctifera Petrunkevitch, 1911 – Southern California, Arizona, New Mexico
- C. luctuosa O. Pickard-Cambridge, 1898 – Mexico
- C. luteipes Mello-Leitão, 1922 – Brazil
- C. maculata Keyserling, 1891 – Brazil
- C. majungae Simon, 1896 – Madagascar
- C. memnonia (C. L. Koch, 1841) – Panama
- C. mexicana (Banks, 1898) – New Mexico, Mexico
- C. micaria (Simon, 1886) – Senegal
- C. minensis Mello-Leitão, 1926 – Brazil
- C. munieri (Simon, 1877) – Morocco, Algeria
- C. nanella Gertsch, 1933 – Arizona, Mexico
- C. obscura Keyserling, 1891 – Brazil
- C. occidens Reiskind, 1969 – Mexico, Southwest United States
- C. onerosa (Keyserling, 1891) – Brazil
- C. patellaris Mello-Leitão, 1943 – Brazil
- C. peregrina (Gertsch, 1935) – Southern Texas, Mexico
- C. phaeochroa Simon, 1910 – Guinea-Bissau
- C. pictipes Mello-Leitão, 1942 – Argentina
- C. plorans (O. Pickard-Cambridge, 1898) – Mexico
- C. polyacantha Mello-Leitão, 1929 – Brazil
- C. pugnax Mello-Leitão, 1948 – Guyana
- C. pulcherrima (O. Pickard-Cambridge, 1874) – Andes
- C. quadrimaculata Reimoser, 1934 – India
- C. quadritaeniata (Simon, 1905) – Indonesia (Java), Philippines
- C. quechua Chamberlin, 1916 – Peru
- C. rica Reiskind, 1969 – Mexico to Costa Rica
- C. rothi Reiskind, 1969 – Southern Arizona, Mexico
- C. rubicunda Keyserling, 1879 (type) – Colombia
- C. rugosa Denis, 1958 – Afghanistan
- C. russellsmithi Deeleman-Reinhold, 2001 – Indonesia (Sulawesi)
- C. rutilans Simon, 1896 – Brazil
- C. salticina (Taczanowski, 1874) – French Guiana
- C. scutata Schmidt, 1971 – Brazil
- C. setosa Mello-Leitão, 1947 – Brazil
- C. sexmaculata Mello-Leitão, 1926 – Brazil
- C. shaxianensis Gong, 1983 – China, Korea, Japan
- C. similis (Banks, 1929) – Mexico to Panama
- C. soyauxi (Karsch, 1879) – Congo
- C. spinipalpis Mello-Leitão, 1945 – Argentina
- C. stylifera Kraus, 1955 – El Salvador
- C. swiftay Pett, 2023 – Costa Rica
- C. tenuiformis Simon, 1896 – Bolivia, Paraguay
- C. tenuis Simon, 1896 – Brazil
- C. teres Simon, 1897 – Paraguay
- C. thalia Reiskind, 1969 – California, Oregon
- C. thomensis Simon, 1910 – São Tomé and Príncipe
- C. tinae Patel & Patel, 1973 – India, China
- C. trifasciata Yin, Xie, Gong & Kim, 1996 – China
- C. trilineata (Hentz, 1847) – US, Canada
- C. trimac Reiskind, 1969 – Panama
- C. truncata Kraus, 1955 – El Salvador
- C. valida Keyserling, 1891 – Brazil
- C. variata Gertsch, 1942 – US, Canada
- C. venusta (Banks, 1898) – Mexico, Guatemala
- C. venustula (Pavesi, 1895) – Ethiopia
- C. virgulifera Mello-Leitão, 1922 – Brazil
- C. vittatula Roewer, 1951 – Brazil
- C. vulnerea Gertsch, 1942 – Eastern United States
- C. walsinghami (O. Pickard-Cambridge, 1874) – US, Canada
- C. xanthomela Mello-Leitão, 1941 – Argentina
- C. zembla Reiskind, 1969 – Mexico
- C. zetes Simon, 1897 – Pakistan, India, Bangladesh
- C. zionis (Chamberlin & Woodbury, 1929) – Utah
