= Mexicomiris texanus =

Scientific classification
- Kingdom: Animalia
- Phylum: Arthropoda
- Class: Insecta
- Order: Hemiptera
- Suborder: Heteroptera
- Family: Miridae
- Tribe: Herdoniini
- Genus: Mexicomiris
- Species: M. texanus

Binomial name
- Mexicomiris texanus Carvalho, 1986

Species of true bug

Mexicomiris texanus is a species of plant bug in the family Miridae. It is found in North America.
