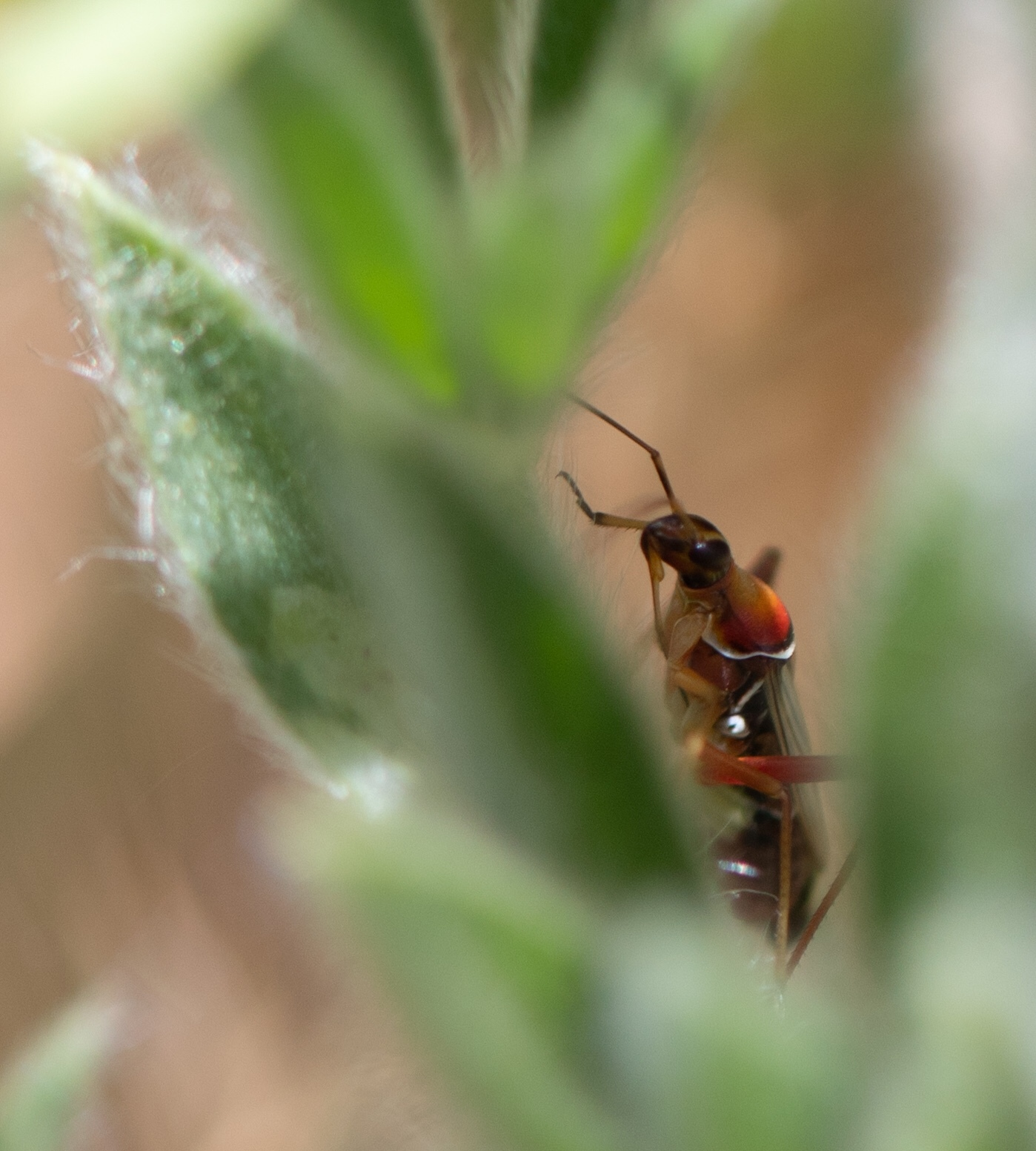

Scientific classification
- Kingdom: Animalia
- Phylum: Arthropoda
- Clade: Pancrustacea
- Class: Insecta
- Order: Hemiptera
- Suborder: Heteroptera
- Family: Miridae
- Tribe: Herdoniini
- Genus: Closterocoris
- Species: C. amoenus

Binomial name
- Closterocoris amoenus (Provancher, 1887)

Synonyms
- Closterocoris ornata Uhler, 1890

= Closterocoris amoenus =

Species of true bug

Closterocoris amoenus is a species of plant bug in the family Miridae. It is found in Central America and North America.

== Description ==
The parempodia are more slender, straplike, and less robust than those of nearly all other Miridae. The inner surface of the parempodia is striated.

They diverge from other Miridae with a reduced and apomorphic apex (highest part of the body).
