= Barberiella formicoides =

Scientific classification
- Kingdom: Animalia
- Phylum: Arthropoda
- Class: Insecta
- Order: Hemiptera
- Suborder: Heteroptera
- Family: Miridae
- Tribe: Herdoniini
- Genus: Barberiella
- Species: B. formicoides

Binomial name
- Barberiella formicoides Poppius, 1914

Species of true bug

Barberiella formicoides is a species of plant bug in the family Miridae. It is found in Central America and North America.
