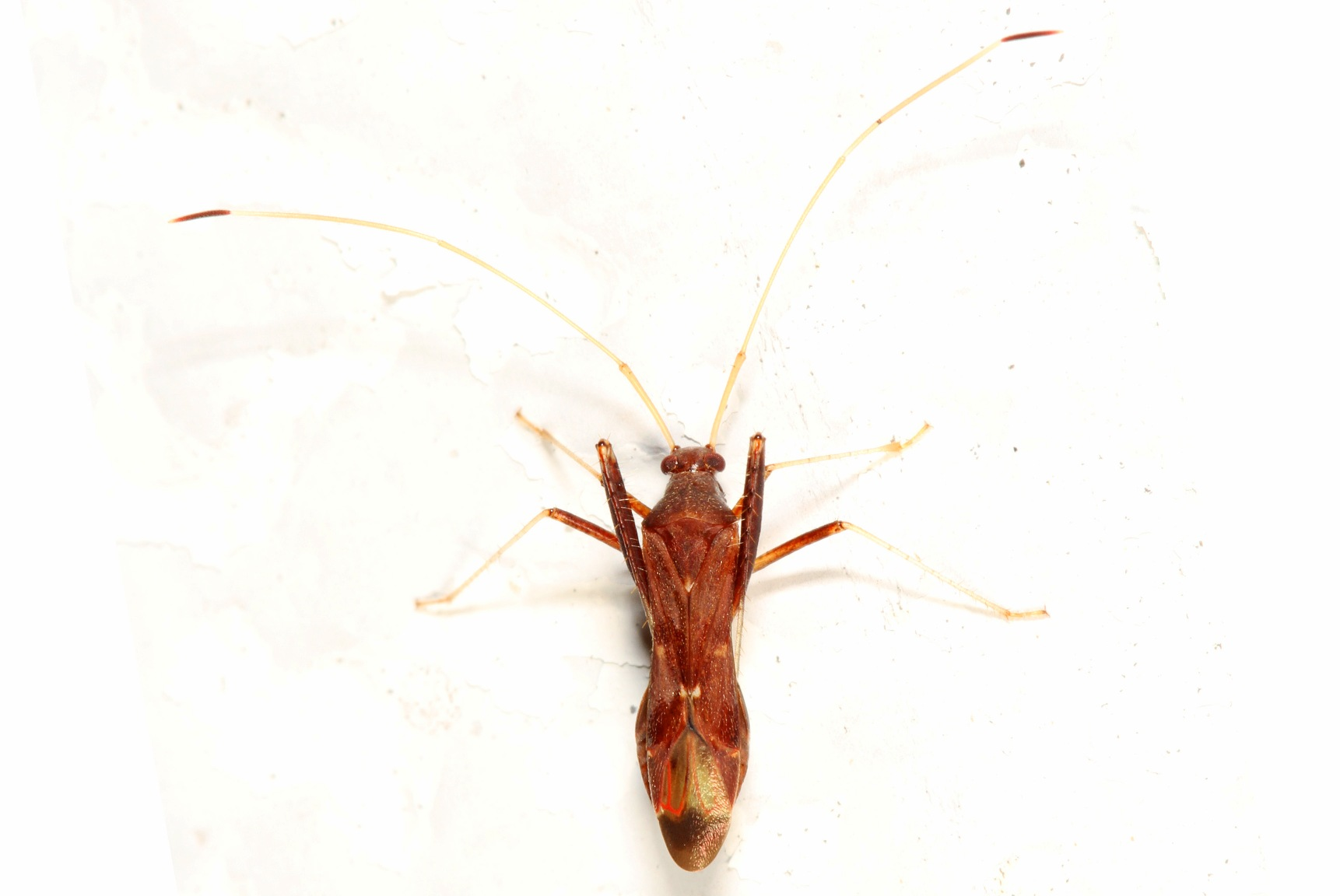

Scientific classification
- Kingdom: Animalia
- Phylum: Arthropoda
- Class: Insecta
- Order: Hemiptera
- Suborder: Heteroptera
- Family: Miridae
- Tribe: Herdoniini
- Genus: Paraxenetus
- Species: P. guttulatus

Binomial name
- Paraxenetus guttulatus (Uhler, 1887)

= Paraxenetus guttulatus =

Species of true bug

Paraxenetus guttulatus is a species of plant bug in the family Miridae. It is found in North America.
