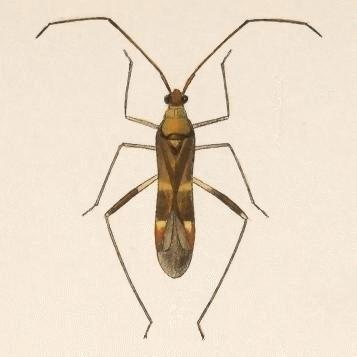
- Paraxenetus bracteatus

Scientific classification
- Kingdom: Animalia
- Phylum: Arthropoda
- Clade: Pancrustacea
- Class: Insecta
- Order: Hemiptera
- Suborder: Heteroptera
- Family: Miridae
- Subfamily: Mirinae
- Tribe: Herdoniini
- Genus: Paraxenetus; Reuter, 1907

= Paraxenetus =

Genus of true bugs

Paraxenetus is a genus of plant bugs in the family Miridae. There are about 17 described species in Paraxenetus.

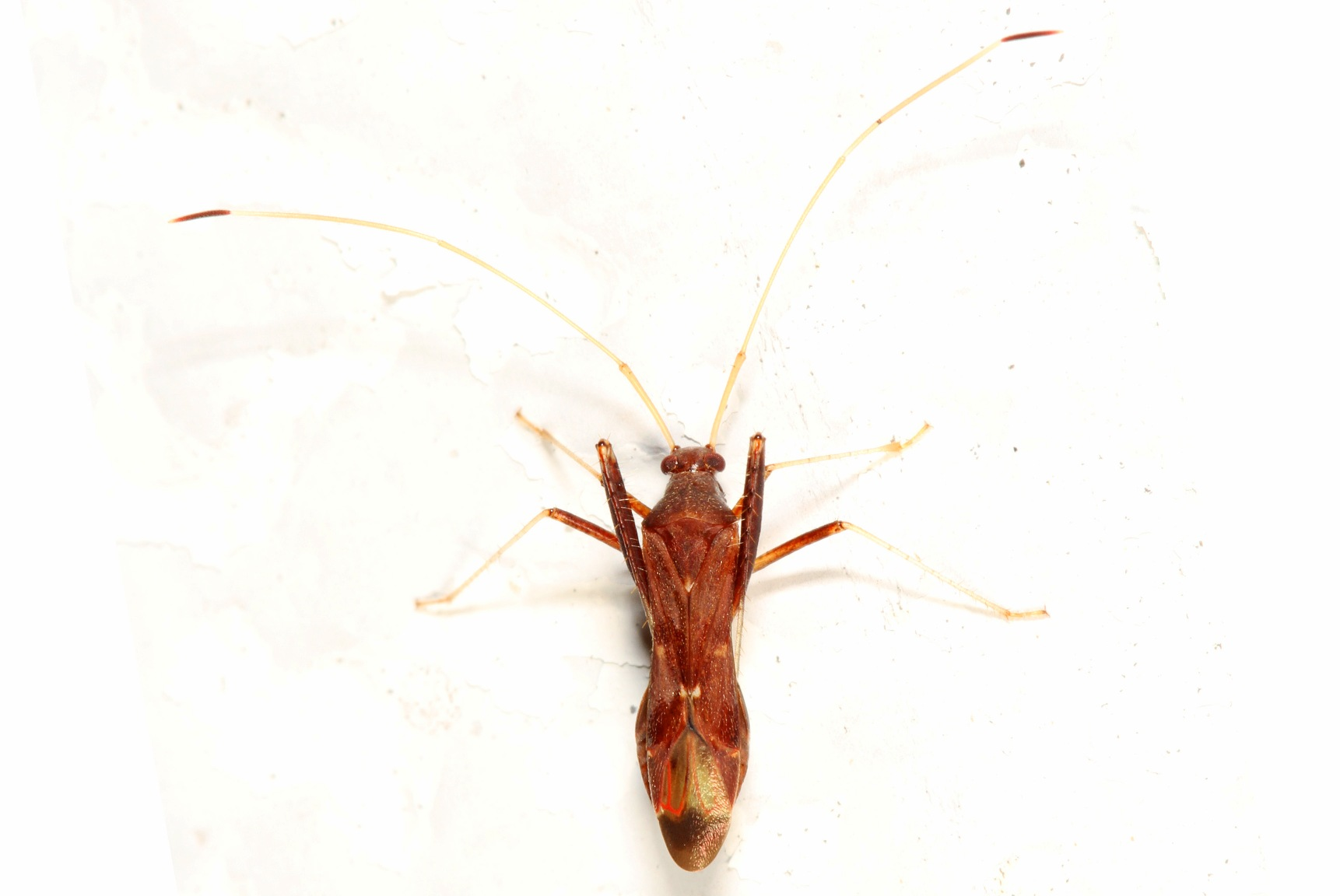
Paraxenetus guttulatus

== Species ==
These 17 species belong to the genus Paraxenetus:

- Paraxenetus albonotatus Carvalho, 1988
- Paraxenetus alvarengai Carvalho & Ferreira, 1973
- Paraxenetus annulicornis Reuter, 1907
- Paraxenetus aspersus Carvalho & Ferreira, 1973
- Paraxenetus bahianus Carvalho & Ferreira, 1973
- Paraxenetus bracteatus (Distant, 1883)
- Paraxenetus brailovskyi Schaffner & Carvalho, 1985
- Paraxenetus brasilianus Carvalho & Ferreira, 1973
- Paraxenetus cuiabanus Carvalho & Ferreira, 1973
- Paraxenetus cuneopunctatus Carvalho, 1988
- Paraxenetus guttulatus (Uhler, 1887)
- Paraxenetus minusculus Carvalho & Ferreira, 1973
- Paraxenetus paranaensis Carvalho & Ferreira, 1973
- Paraxenetus pirapora Carvalho & Wallerstein, 1978
- Paraxenetus rubricuneus Carvalho, 1988
- Paraxenetus seabrai Carvalho & Ferreira, 1973
- Paraxenetus trifasciatus Carvalho & Wallerstein, 1978
