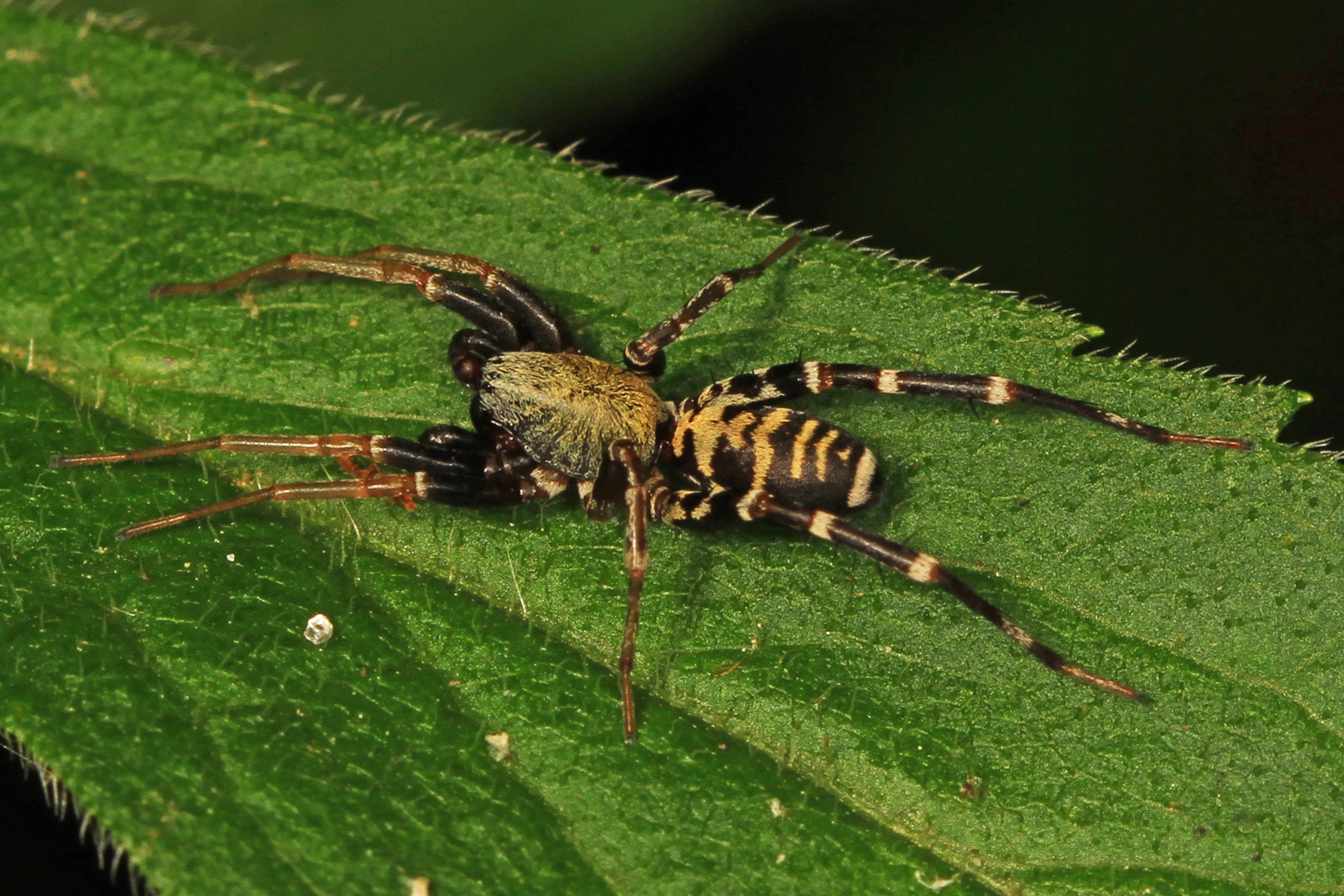

Conservation status
- Secure (NatureServe)

Scientific classification
- Kingdom: Animalia
- Phylum: Arthropoda
- Subphylum: Chelicerata
- Class: Arachnida
- Order: Araneae
- Infraorder: Araneomorphae
- Family: Corinnidae
- Genus: Castianeira
- Species: C. longipalpa

Binomial name
- Castianeira longipalpa (Hentz, 1847)

= Castianeira longipalpa =

Species of spider

Castianeira longipalpa is an ant mimic spider species in the family Corinnidae. They can be dark grey, brown or black and possess numerous transverse bands on their abdomen. Females are 7–9 mm long and males are 5.5–6 mm long. They are fast runners, often active during the day, living on the ground and among leaves or under rocks and other debris in prairies, deciduous forests, shrubby areas, and wooded sand dunes. They are the most widespread member of the genus Castianeira in the United States and Canada.

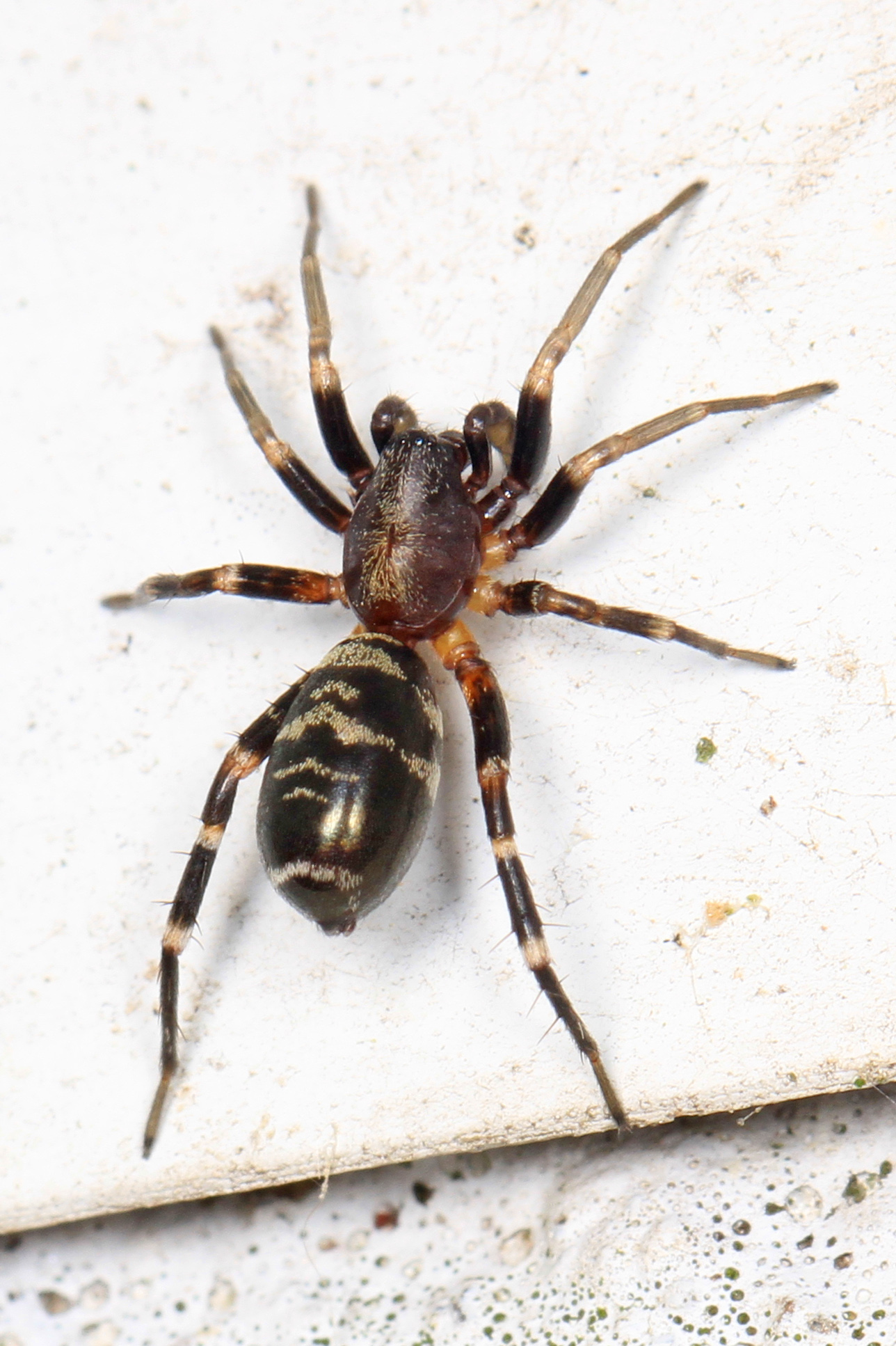

Two ants and a Castianeira longipalpa investigate a tiger beetle larvae shaft just after the beetle larvae pulled an ant down to consume. Part repeated at one tenth speed.
