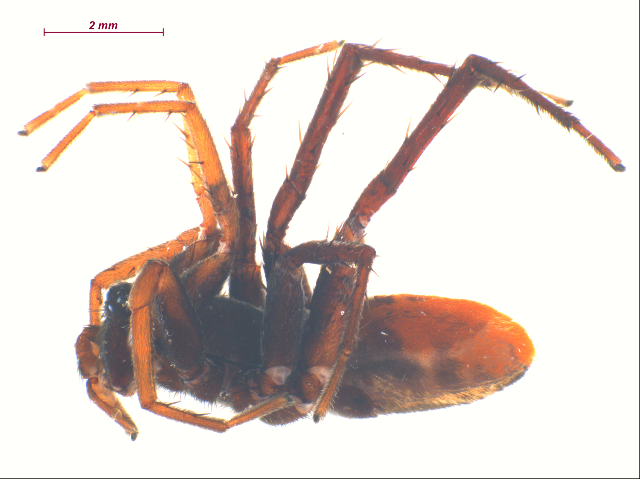
- C. walsinghami, male
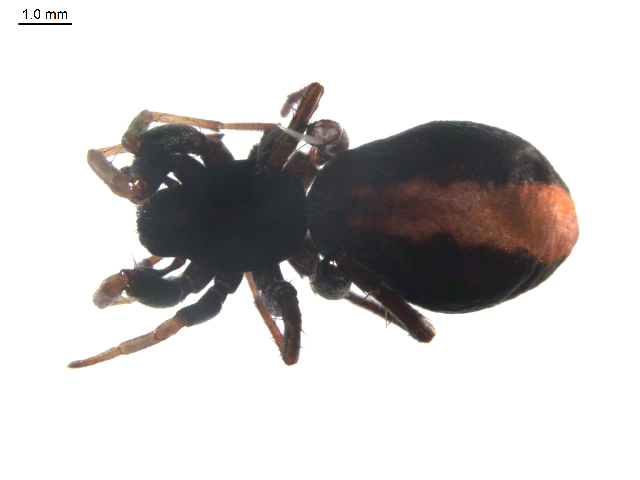
- C. walsinghami, female

Conservation status
- Secure (NatureServe)

Scientific classification
- Kingdom: Animalia
- Phylum: Arthropoda
- Subphylum: Chelicerata
- Class: Arachnida
- Order: Araneae
- Infraorder: Araneomorphae
- Family: Corinnidae
- Genus: Castianeira
- Species: C. walsinghami

Binomial name
- Castianeira walsinghami (O. P.-Cambridge, 1874)

= Castianeira walsinghami =

Species of spider

Castianeira walsinghami is a species of true spider in the family Corinnidae. It is found in the United States and Canada.
