= Closterocoris elegans =

Scientific classification
- Domain: Eukaryota
- Kingdom: Animalia
- Phylum: Arthropoda
- Class: Insecta
- Order: Hemiptera
- Suborder: Heteroptera
- Family: Miridae
- Genus: Closterocoris
- Species: C. elegans

Binomial name
- Closterocoris elegans S.Scudder, 1890

Extinct species of true bug

Closterocoris elegans is an extinct species of jumping tree bug in the family Miridae.
