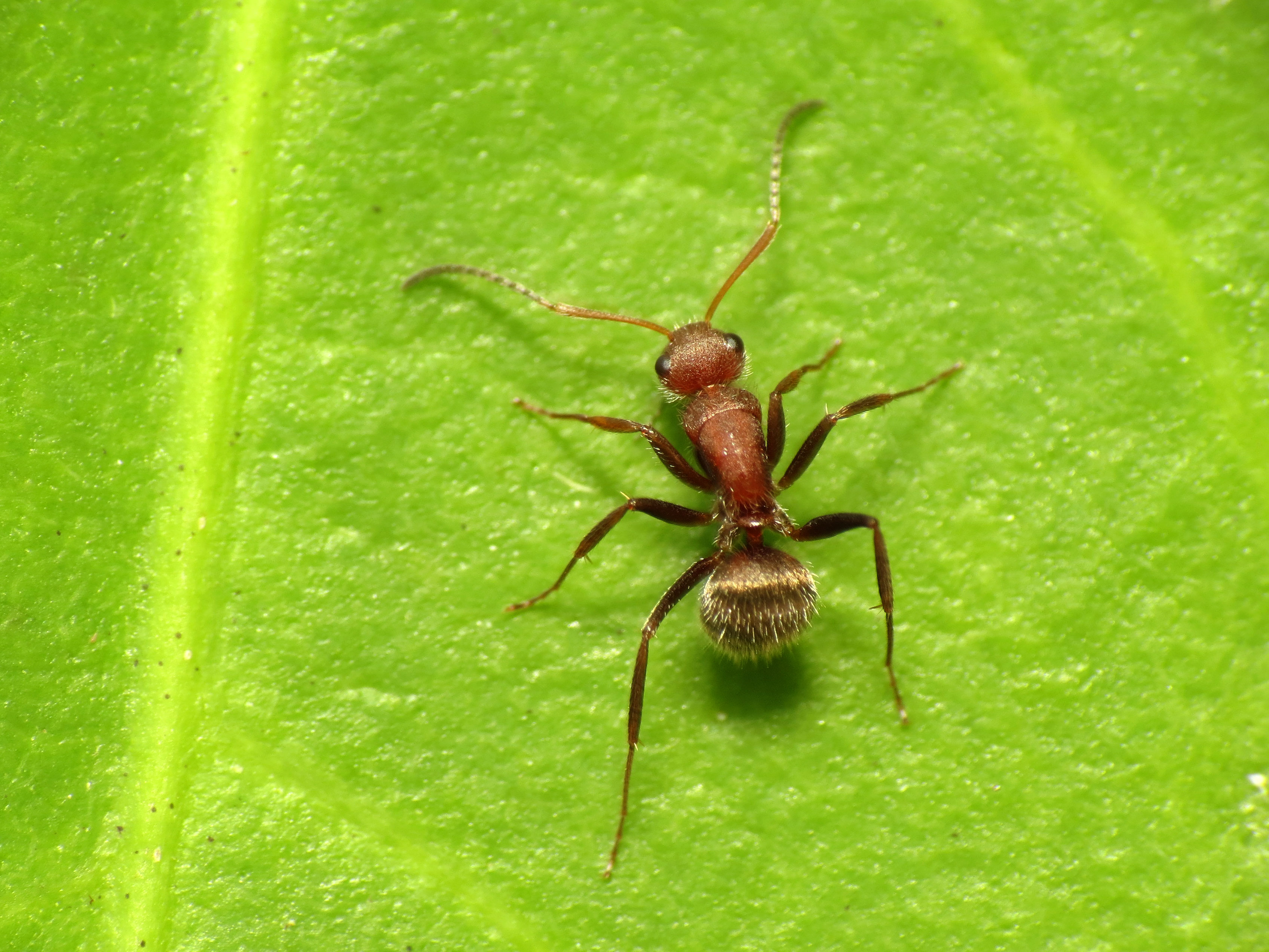

Scientific classification
- Kingdom: Animalia
- Phylum: Arthropoda
- Clade: Pancrustacea
- Class: Insecta
- Order: Hymenoptera
- Family: Formicidae
- Subfamily: Formicinae
- Genus: Camponotus
- Subgenus: Myrmobrachys
- Species: C. planatus

Binomial name
- Camponotus planatus Roger, 1863

= Camponotus planatus =

Species of ant

Camponotus planatus, known generally as the compact carpenter ant or short carpenter ant, is one of three Camponotus species that is polygynous, or has more than one queen. It is a species of ant (family Formicidae).

== Arthropod mimics ==
Four species of arthropod mimic Camponotus planatus within the Mountain Pine Ridge Forest Reserve of British Honduras. This is both Batesian and Wassmanian mimicry. The first mimic is the clubnoid spider (Myrmecotypus fuliginosus) which mimics C. planatus in various ways including morphology and behaviour. Secondly, the salticid spider Sarindia linda mimics C. planatus so well that they are hard to distinguish. S. linda mimics the locomotion patterns, pumping of the abdomen, and movements of the antennae. The third mimic is a Mirid bug (Barberiella) which mimics the model in both gait and antennal mimicry. Finally, the mantid, Mantoida maya also uses C. planatus as a model. Individuals that mimic C. planatus are typically 3-9mm long and predators tend to avoid them. All four mimics have been seen foraging in areas with their model with no interference.

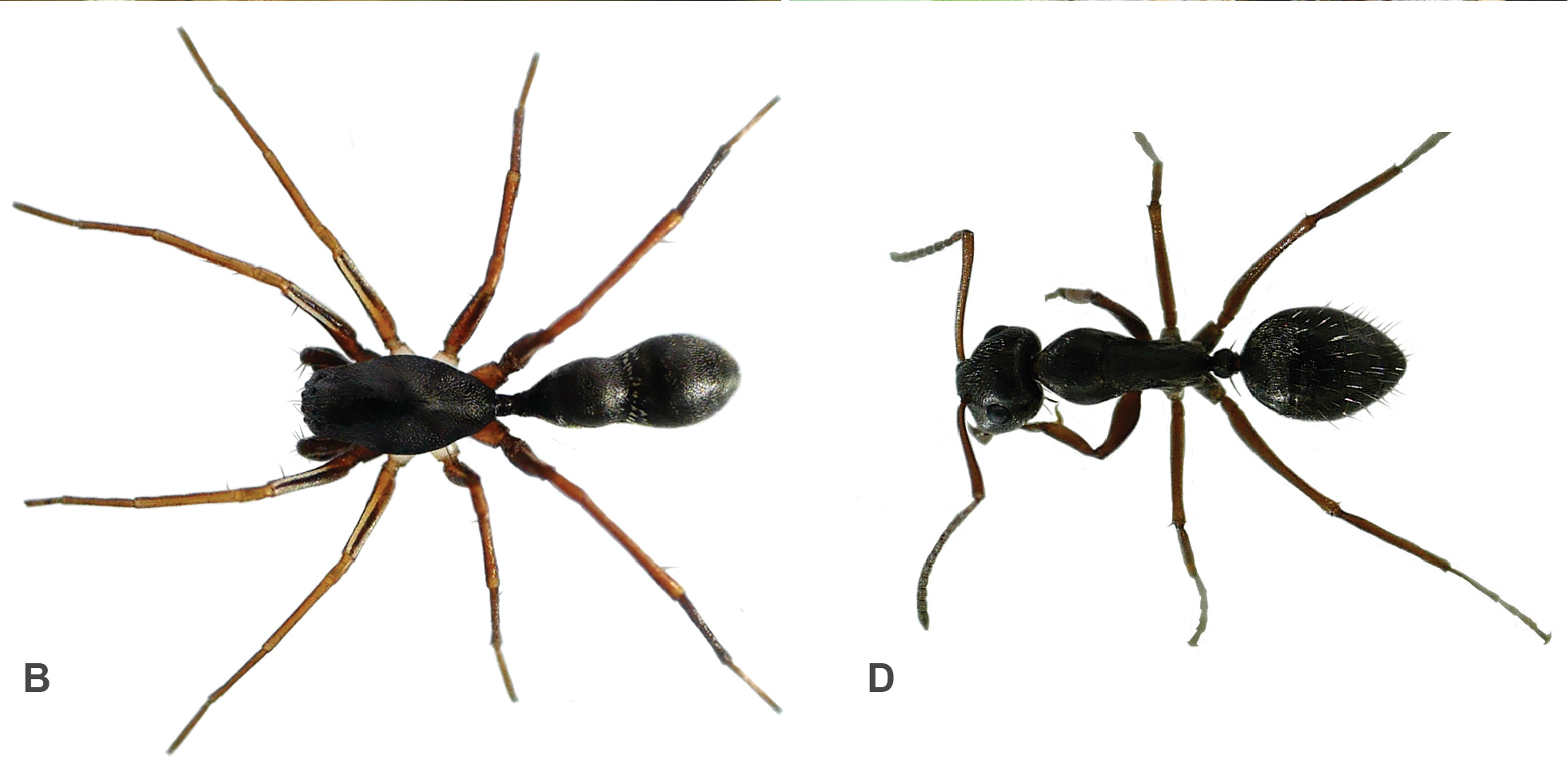
Myrmecotypus mazaxoides mimic (left), carpenter ant model (right)

== Seasonal diet shift ==
Camponotus planatus in Yucatan, Mexico, exhibits a seasonal shift in feeding habits based on carbon isotopic evidence. During the dry season, these ants primarily forage on nectar from the CAM (Crassulacean Acid Metabolism) orchid Schomburgkia tibicinis, accumulating high levels of CAM-metabolized carbon in their tissues. However, in the wet season, they shift to foraging on other nectar sources and insect prey, which are primarily C3 plants. This change is evident through stable carbon isotope analysis, which shows increased C3 carbon in ant tissues during the wet season

== Subspecies ==
- Camponotus planatus acaciae Emery, 1920
- Camponotus planatus colombicus Forel, 1899
- Camponotus planatus continentis Forel, 1901
- Camponotus planatus esdras Forel, 1916
- Camponotus planatus planatus Roger, 1863
