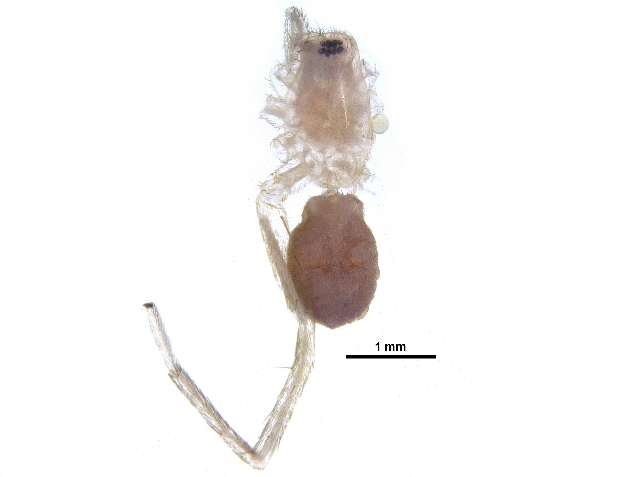
- C. gertschi from Ontario, Canada

Scientific classification
- Kingdom: Animalia
- Phylum: Arthropoda
- Subphylum: Chelicerata
- Class: Arachnida
- Order: Araneae
- Infraorder: Araneomorphae
- Family: Corinnidae
- Genus: Castianeira
- Species: C. gertschi

Binomial name
- Castianeira gertschi Kaston, 1945

= Castianeira gertschi =

Species of spider

Castianeira gertschi, the Gertsch antmimic, is a species of true spider in the family Corinnidae. It is found in the United States and Canada.
