= Nannaria terricola =

Scientific classification
- Kingdom: Animalia
- Phylum: Arthropoda
- Subphylum: Myriapoda
- Class: Diplopoda
- Order: Polydesmida
- Family: Xystodesmidae
- Genus: Nannaria
- Species: N. terricola

Binomial name
- Nannaria terricola (Williams & Hefner, 1928)

Species of millipede

Nannaria terricola is a species of flat-backed millipede in the family Xystodesmidae. It is found in the Great Lakes region of the United States.
