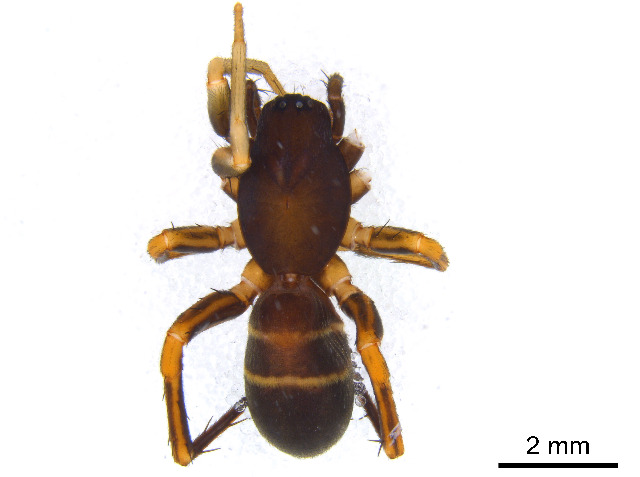
- C. cingulata from Ontario, Canada

Conservation status
- Secure (NatureServe)

Scientific classification
- Kingdom: Animalia
- Phylum: Arthropoda
- Subphylum: Chelicerata
- Class: Arachnida
- Order: Araneae
- Infraorder: Araneomorphae
- Family: Corinnidae
- Genus: Castianeira
- Species: C. cingulata

Binomial name
- Castianeira cingulata (C. L. Koch, 1841)

= Castianeira cingulata =

Species of spider

Castianeira cingulata, the twobanded antmimic, is a species of true spider in the family Corinnidae and is an ant mimic. It is found in the United States and Canada.
