= Castianeira crocata =

Scientific classification
- Domain: Eukaryota
- Kingdom: Animalia
- Phylum: Arthropoda
- Subphylum: Chelicerata
- Class: Arachnida
- Order: Araneae
- Infraorder: Araneomorphae
- Family: Corinnidae
- Genus: Castianeira
- Species: C. crocata

Binomial name
- Castianeira crocata (Hentz, 1847)

Species of spider

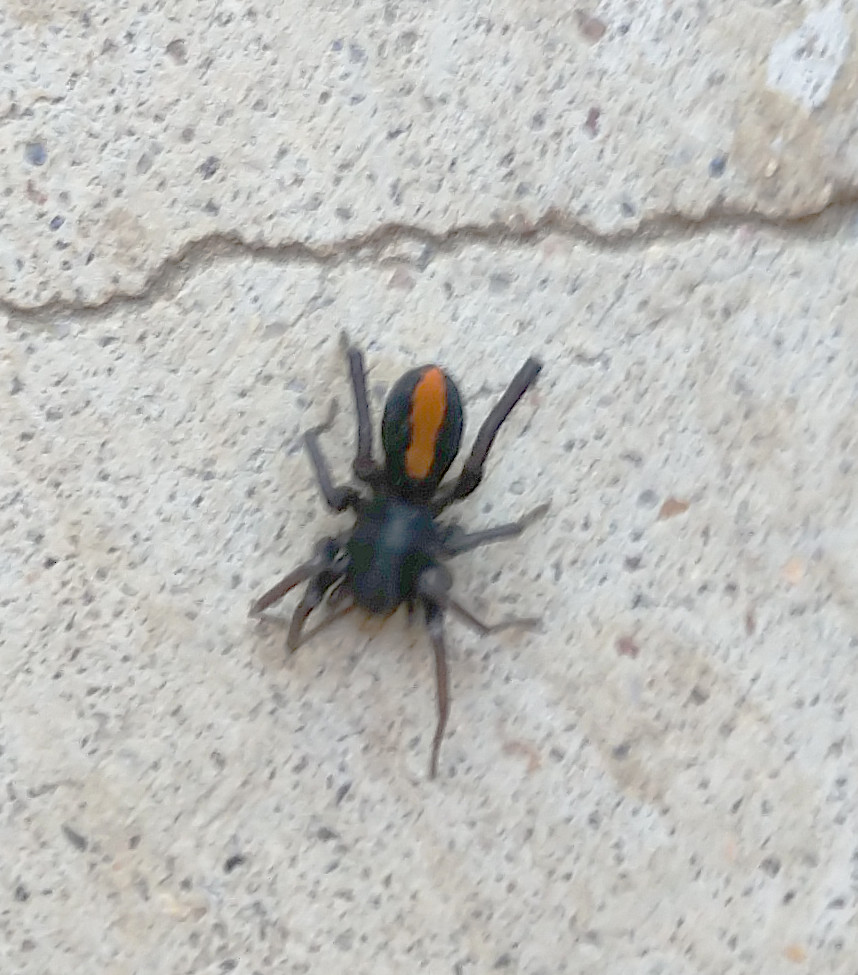

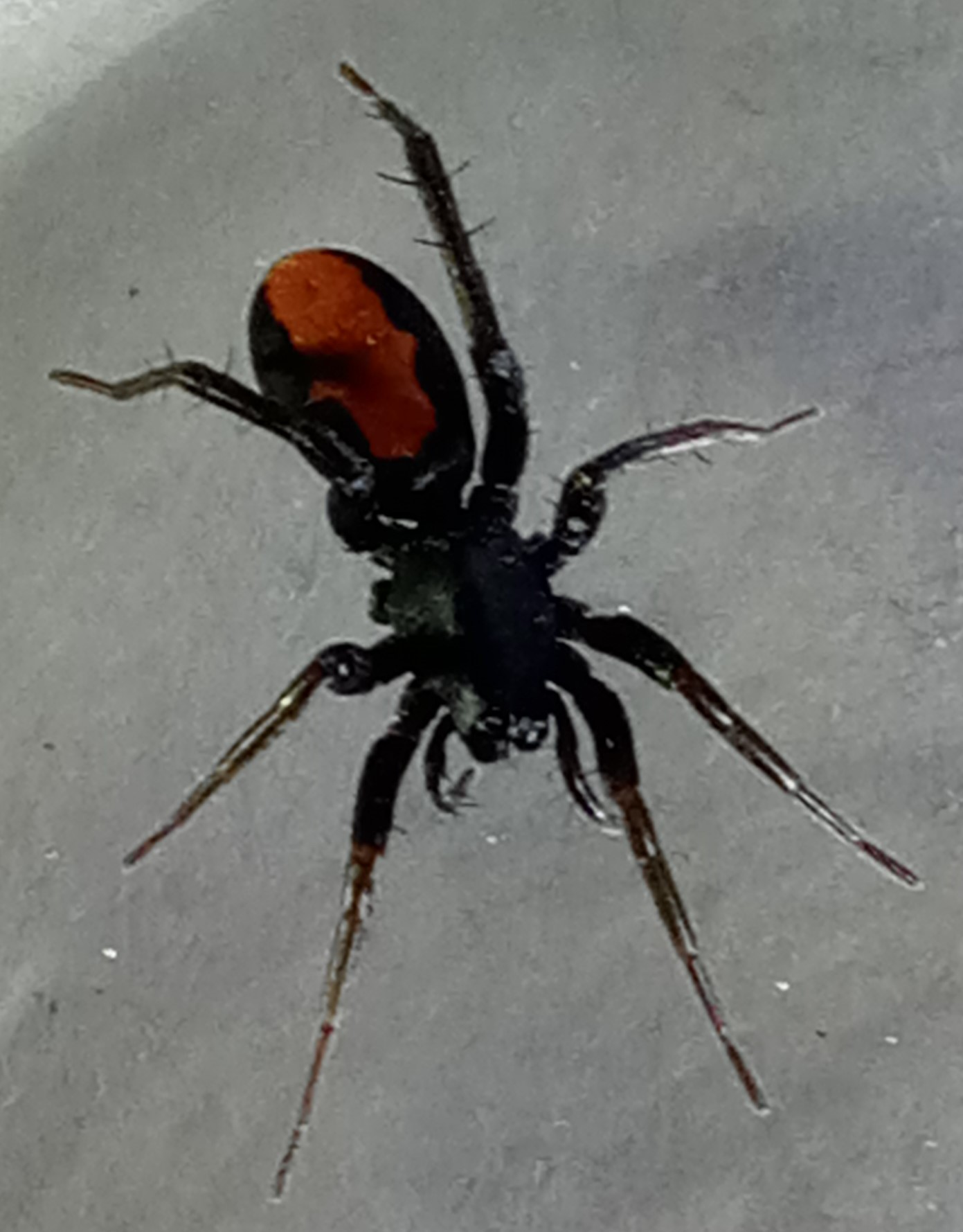

Castianeira crocata is a species of true spider in the family Corinnidae, sometimes called by the common name red stripe spider. The species was first described by Nicholas Marcellus Hentz in 1847. It is found in the United States. Though its body shape is quite different, its characteristic black body and red-marked back puts it at risk of being mistaken for a black widow spider.
