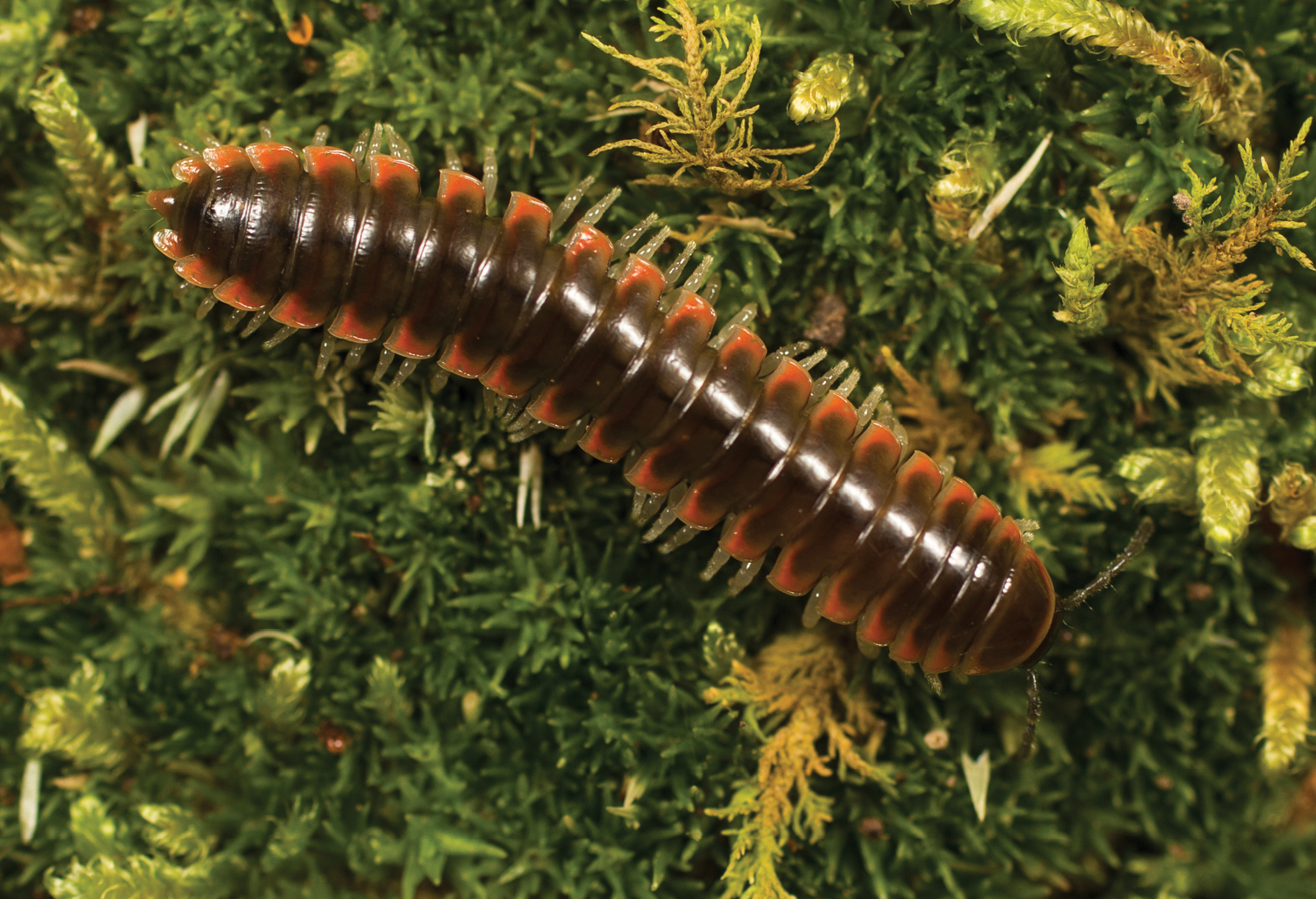
- Male N. wilsoni from Giles County, Virginia.

Scientific classification
- Domain: Eukaryota
- Kingdom: Animalia
- Phylum: Arthropoda
- Subphylum: Myriapoda
- Class: Diplopoda
- Order: Polydesmida
- Family: Xystodesmidae
- Subfamily: Rhysodesminae
- Genus: Nannaria; Chamberlin, 1918

Type species
- Nannaria minor Chamberlin, 1918

Synonyms
- Mimuloria Chamberlin, 1928; Castanaria Causey, 1950

= Nannaria =

Genus of millipedes

The genus Nannaria, commonly known as twisted-claw millipedes, is a genus of millipedes in the family Xystodesmidae first described by Ralph Chamberlin in 1918. In 2022, entomologists Derek Hennen, Jackson Means and Paul Marek discovered and described 17 new species, which expanded the size of Nannaria to 78, making it the largest genus of Xystodesmidae.

== Species ==
These 78 species belong to the genus Nannaria:

- Nannaria acroteria Hennen, Means & Marek, 2022
- Nannaria aenigma Means, Hennen & Marek, 2021
- Nannaria alpina Means, Hennen & Marek, 2021
- Nannaria ambulatrix Means, Hennen & Marek, 2021
- Nannaria amicalola Hennen, Means & Marek, 2022
- Nannaria antarctica Hennen, Means & Marek, 2022
- Nannaria asta Means, Hennen & Marek, 2021
- Nannaria austricola Hoffman, 1950
- Nannaria blackmountainensis Means, Hennen & Marek, 2021
- Nannaria bobmareki Means, Hennen & Marek, 2021
- Nannaria botrydium Means, Hennen & Marek, 2021
- Nannaria breweri Means, Hennen & Marek, 2021
- Nannaria castanea (McNeill, 1887)
- Nannaria castra Means, Hennen & Marek, 2021
- Nannaria caverna Means, Hennen & Marek, 2021
- Nannaria cingulata Means, Hennen & Marek, 2021
- Nannaria conservata Chamberlin, 1940
- Nannaria cryomaia Means, Hennen & Marek, 2021
- Nannaria cymontana Hennen, Means & Marek, 2022
- Nannaria daptria Means, Hennen & Marek, 2021
- Nannaria davidcauseyi Causey, 1950
- Nannaria dilatata (Hennen & Shelley, 2015)
- Nannaria domestica Shelley, 1975
- Nannaria equalis Chamberlin, 1949
- Nannaria ericacea Hoffman, 1949
- Nannaria filicata Hennen, Means & Marek, 2022
- Nannaria fowleri Chamberlin, 1947
- Nannaria fracta Means, Hennen & Marek, 2021
- Nannaria fritzae Means, Hennen & Marek, 2021
- Nannaria hardeni Means, Hennen & Marek, 2021
- Nannaria hippopotamus Means, Hennen & Marek, 2021
- Nannaria hokie Means, Hennen & Marek, 2021
- Nannaria honeytreetrailensis Means, Hennen & Marek, 2021
- Nannaria ignis Means, Hennen & Marek, 2021
- Nannaria kassoni Means, Hennen & Marek, 2021
- Nannaria komela Means, Hennen & Marek, 2021
- Nannaria laminata Hoffman, 1949
- Nannaria liriodendra Hennen, Means & Marek, 2022
- Nannaria lithographa Hennen, Means & Marek, 2022
- Nannaria lutra Hennen, Means & Marek, 2022
- Nannaria marianae Hennen, Means & Marek, 2022
- Nannaria mcelroyorum Means, Hennen & Marek, 2021
- Nannaria minor Chamberlin, 1918
- Nannaria missouriensis Chamberlin, 1928
- Nannaria monsdomia Means, Hennen & Marek, 2021
- Nannaria morrisoni Hoffman, 1948
- Nannaria nessa Hennen, Means & Marek, 2022
- Nannaria oblonga (Koch, 1847)
- Nannaria ohionis Loomis & Hoffman, 1948
- Nannaria orycta Hennen, Means & Marek, 2022
- Nannaria paraptoma Hennen, Means & Marek, 2022
- Nannaria paupertas Means, Hennen & Marek, 2021
- Nannaria piccolia Means, Hennen & Marek, 2021
- Nannaria rhododendra Hennen, Means & Marek, 2022
- Nannaria rhysodesmoides (Hennen & Shelley, 2015)
- Nannaria rutherfordensis Shelley, 1975
- Nannaria scholastica Means, Hennen & Marek, 2021
- Nannaria scutellaria Causey, 1942
- Nannaria serpens Means, Hennen & Marek, 2021
- Nannaria sheari Means, Hennen & Marek, 2021
- Nannaria shenandoa Hoffman, 1949
- Nannaria sigmoidea (Hennen & Shelley, 2015)
- Nannaria simplex Hoffman, 1949
- Nannaria solenas Means, Hennen & Marek, 2021
- Nannaria spalax Hennen, Means & Marek, 2022
- Nannaria spiralis Hennen, Means & Marek, 2022
- Nannaria spruilli Means, Hennen & Marek, 2021
- Nannaria stellapolis Means, Hennen & Marek, 2021
- Nannaria stellaradix Means, Hennen & Marek, 2021
- Nannaria suprema Means, Hennen & Marek, 2021
- Nannaria swiftae Hennen, Means & Marek, 2022
- Nannaria tasskelsoae Means, Hennen & Marek, 2021
- Nannaria tennesseensis (Bollman, 1888)
- Nannaria tenuis Means, Hennen & Marek, 2021
- Nannaria terricola (Williams & Hefner, 1928)
- Nannaria tsuga Means, Hennen & Marek, 2021
- Nannaria vellicata Hennen, Means & Marek, 2022
- Nannaria wilsoni Hoffman, 1949
