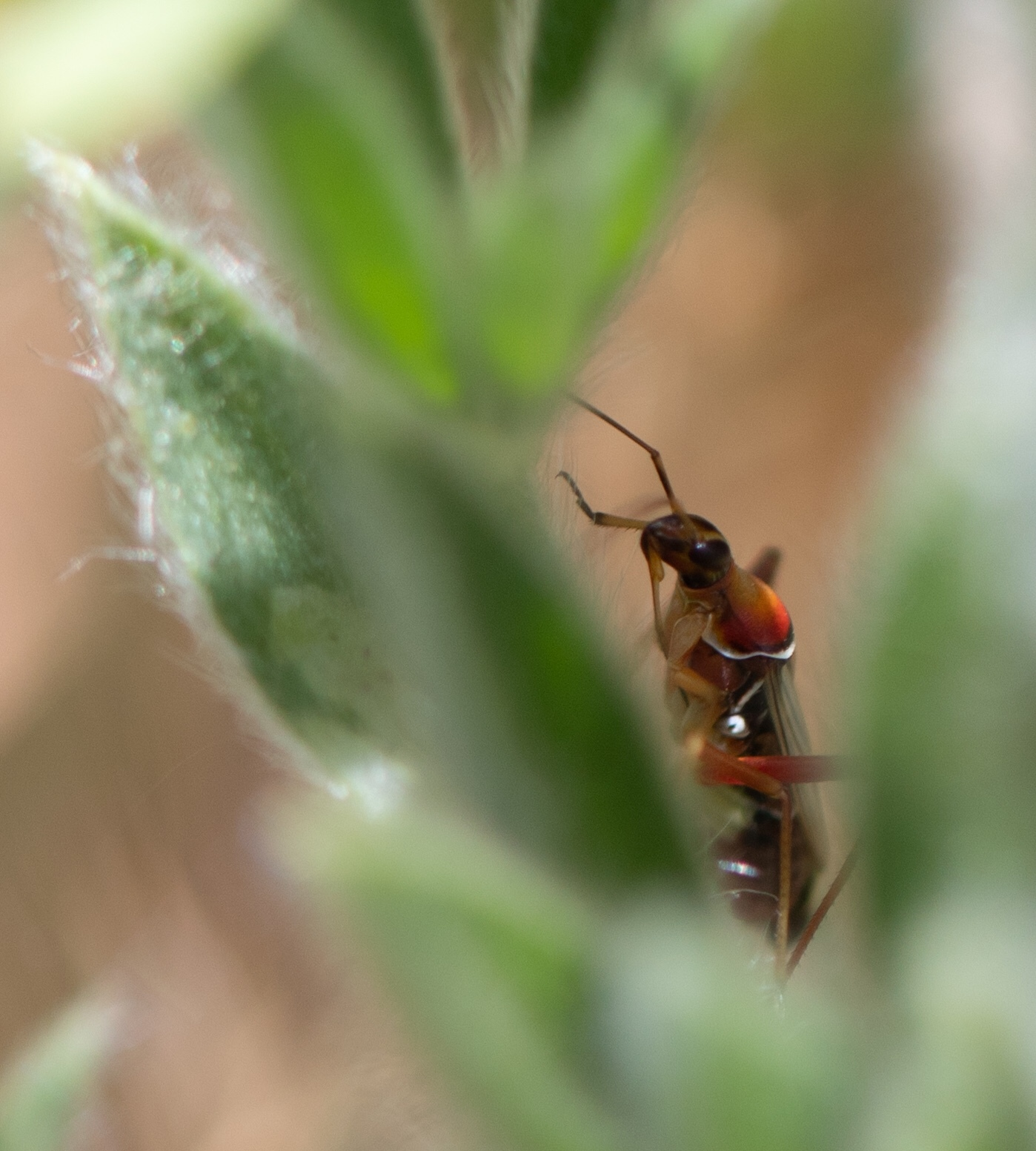

Scientific classification
- Kingdom: Animalia
- Phylum: Arthropoda
- Class: Insecta
- Order: Hemiptera
- Suborder: Heteroptera
- Family: Miridae
- Tribe: Herdoniini
- Genus: Closterocoris; Uhler, 1890

= Closterocoris =

Closterocoris Temporal range: 33.9–0 Ma

Extinct genus of true bugs

Closterocoris is a genus of plant bugs in the family Miridae.

There are two described species in Closterocoris. Closterocoris elegans is an extinct species found in the Eocene Florissant Formation of Colorado. Closterocoris amoenus, extant, is found along the Pacific coast of California and Baja California, Mexico.
