= Nannaria ohionis =

Scientific classification
- Kingdom: Animalia
- Phylum: Arthropoda
- Subphylum: Myriapoda
- Class: Diplopoda
- Order: Polydesmida
- Family: Xystodesmidae
- Genus: Nannaria
- Species: N. ohionis

Binomial name
- Nannaria ohionis Loomis & Hoffman, 1948

Species of millipede

Nannaria ohionis is a species of flat-backed millipede in the family Xystodesmidae. It is found in the Midwestern United States.
