= Castianeira crucigera =

Scientific classification
- Domain: Eukaryota
- Kingdom: Animalia
- Phylum: Arthropoda
- Subphylum: Chelicerata
- Class: Arachnida
- Order: Araneae
- Infraorder: Araneomorphae
- Family: Corinnidae
- Genus: Castianeira
- Species: C. crucigera

Binomial name
- Castianeira crucigera (Hentz, 1847)

Species of spider

Castianeira crucigera is a species of true spider in the family Corinnidae. It is found in the United States.
