= Cyphopelta =

Scientific classification
- Kingdom: Animalia
- Phylum: Arthropoda
- Clade: Pancrustacea
- Class: Insecta
- Order: Hemiptera
- Suborder: Heteroptera
- Family: Miridae
- Tribe: Herdoniini
- Genus: Cyphopelta; Van Duzee, 1910
- Species: C. modesta

Binomial name
- Cyphopelta modesta Van Duzee, 1910

Genus of true bugs

Cyphopelta is a genus of plant bugs in the family Miridae. There is one described species in Cyphopelta, C. modesta.
