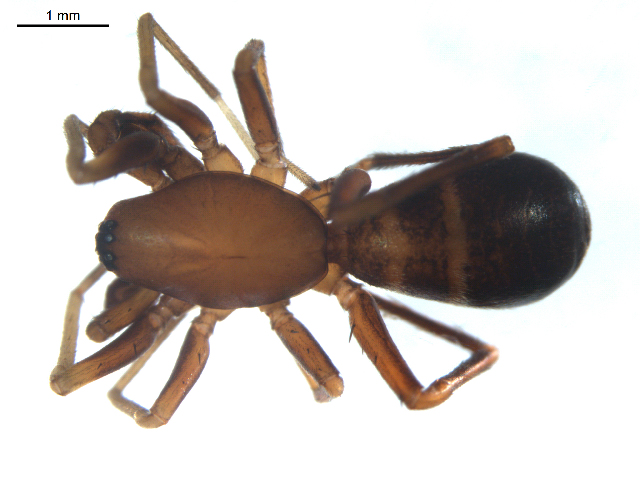
- C. trilineata, adult male
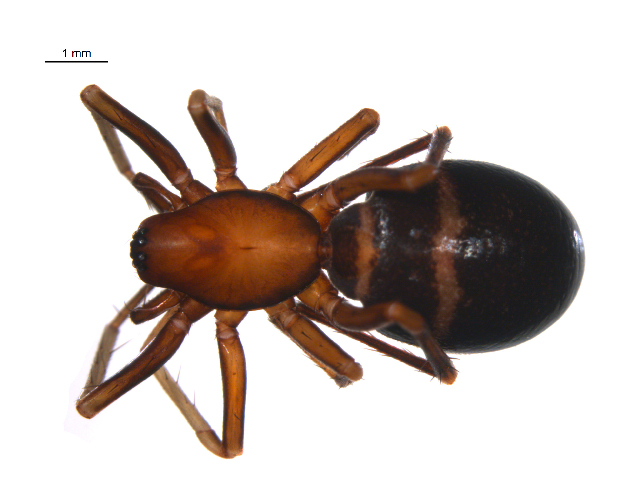
- C. trilineata, adult female

Conservation status
- Apparently Secure (NatureServe)

Scientific classification
- Kingdom: Animalia
- Phylum: Arthropoda
- Subphylum: Chelicerata
- Class: Arachnida
- Order: Araneae
- Infraorder: Araneomorphae
- Family: Corinnidae
- Genus: Castianeira
- Species: C. trilineata

Binomial name
- Castianeira trilineata (Hentz, 1847)

= Castianeira trilineata =

Species of spider

Castianeira trilineata is a species of true spider in the family Corinnidae. It is an ant mimic found in the United States and Canada.
