= Castianeira alteranda =

Scientific classification
- Domain: Eukaryota
- Kingdom: Animalia
- Phylum: Arthropoda
- Subphylum: Chelicerata
- Class: Arachnida
- Order: Araneae
- Infraorder: Araneomorphae
- Family: Corinnidae
- Genus: Castianeira
- Species: C. alteranda

Binomial name
- Castianeira alteranda Gertsch, 1942

Species of spider

Castianeira alteranda is a species of true spider in the family Corinnidae. It is found in the US and Canada.
