= Mexicomiris =

Scientific classification
- Kingdom: Animalia
- Phylum: Arthropoda
- Clade: Pancrustacea
- Class: Insecta
- Order: Hemiptera
- Suborder: Heteroptera
- Family: Miridae
- Subfamily: Mirinae
- Tribe: Herdoniini
- Genus: Mexicomiris; Carvalho & Schaffner, 1974

Genus of true bugs

Mexicomiris is a genus of plant bugs in the family Miridae. There are about seven described species in Mexicomiris.

== Species ==
These seven species belong to the genus Mexicomiris:

- Mexicomiris myrmecoides Carvalho & Schaffner, 1973
- Mexicomiris peudoxenetoides Barros de Carvalho & Schaffner
- Mexicomiris puelbensis Carvalho & Schaffner, 1975
- Mexicomiris quercicola Barros de Carvalho & Schaffner
- Mexicomiris querciola Carvalho & Schaffner, 1975
- Mexicomiris rubidus Carvalho & Schaffner, 1973
- Mexicomiris texanus Carvalho, 1986
