= Castianeira swiftay =

Scientific classification
- Kingdom: Animalia
- Phylum: Arthropoda
- Subphylum: Chelicerata
- Class: Arachnida
- Order: Araneae
- Infraorder: Araneomorphae
- Family: Corinnidae
- Genus: Castianeira
- Species: C. swiftay

Binomial name
- Castianeira swiftay Pett, 2023

Species of spider

Castianeira swiftay is a species of sac spider in the family Corinnidae. It is found in Costa Rica, and named in honor of the American singer-songwriter Taylor Swift.

== Description ==
Myrmecomorphic (ant-mimic) spiders less than 1 cm (6-8 mm) long, mostly reddish-brown in colour in both sexes. Carapace and abdomen dark red, ocular area black with scattered silvery setae, distinct spot of white setae situated posteriorly on abdomen; sternum orange. The species was identified and described by biosciences student Brogan L. Pett of the University of Exeter, United Kingdom, in December 2023. The species is an eponym for Taylor Swift whose music "kept [Pett] energised and motivated through many late nights at the microscope".

== See also ==
- Nannaria swiftae - species of millipede named after Swift
- List of organisms named after famous people
