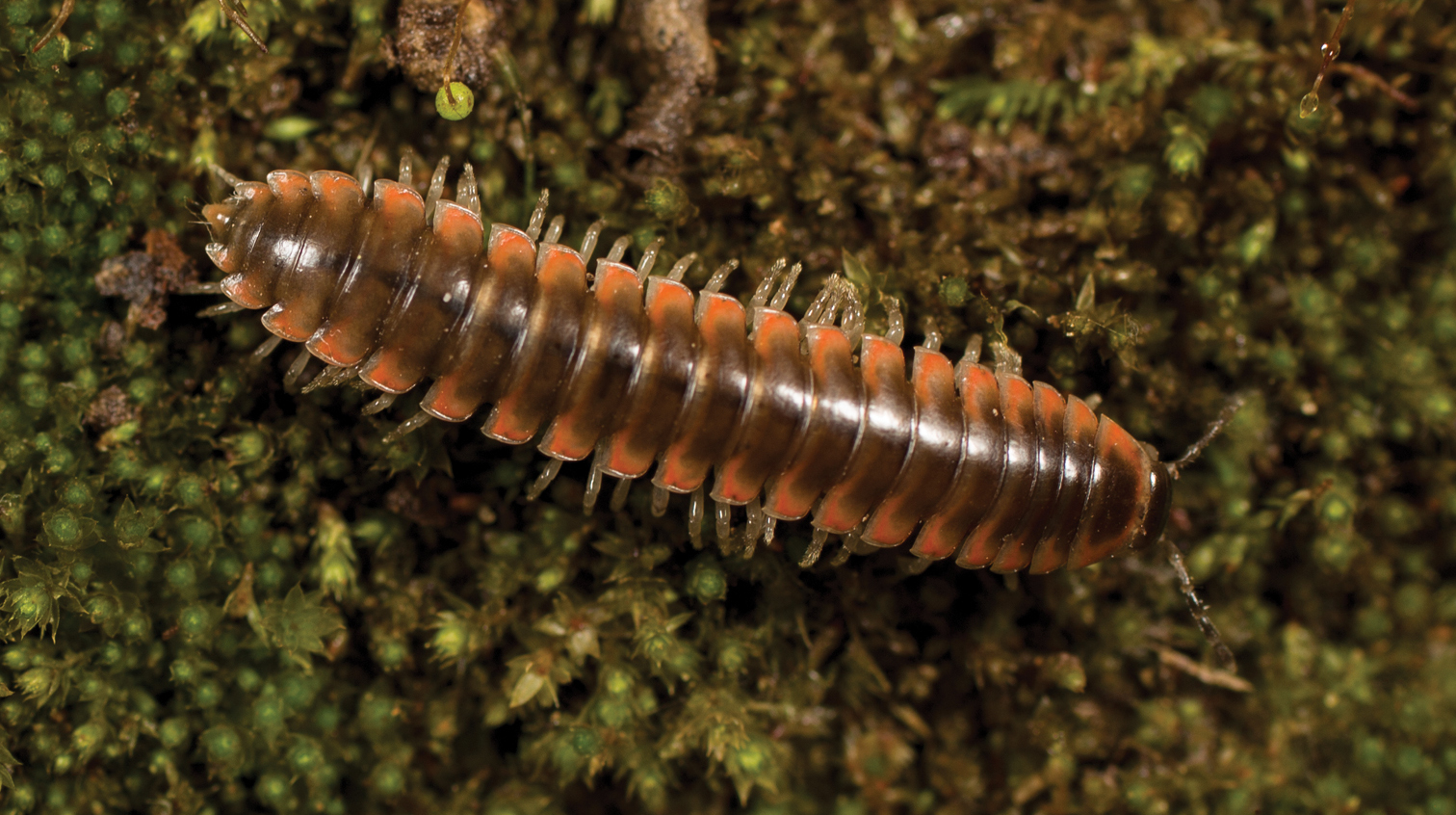
- Male N. swiftae from Van Buren County, Tennessee

Scientific classification
- Kingdom: Animalia
- Phylum: Arthropoda
- Subphylum: Myriapoda
- Class: Diplopoda
- Order: Polydesmida
- Family: Xystodesmidae
- Genus: Nannaria
- Species: N. swiftae

Binomial name
- Nannaria swiftae Hennen, Means & Marek, 2022

= Nannaria swiftae =

Swift twisted-claw millipede

Species of millipede

Nannaria swiftae, also known as the Swift twisted-claw millipede or Taylor Swift's millipede, is a species of millipede in the family Xystodesmidae. It is found only in the Appalachian mountains of the U.S. state of Tennessee. It was discovered and described in 2022 by entomologists Derek Hennen, Jackson Means and Paul Marek, who expanded the genus Nannaria to 78 species. They named the species in honor of American singer-songwriter Taylor Swift.

== Description ==
As part of a multi-year project to collect new specimens of the millipedes throughout the Eastern United States, scientists including Derek Hennen of Virginia Tech traveled to 17 states, to find the species, sequence their DNA, and scientifically describe them. Over 1,800 specimens were collected and assessed during their field study spanning five years. In the end, the team described 17 new species, one of which is N. swiftae.

Nannaria swiftae is a flat-backed millipede that has tergites with two paranotal orange spots, collum outlined in orange, and tergites with background chestnut brown.

== Name ==
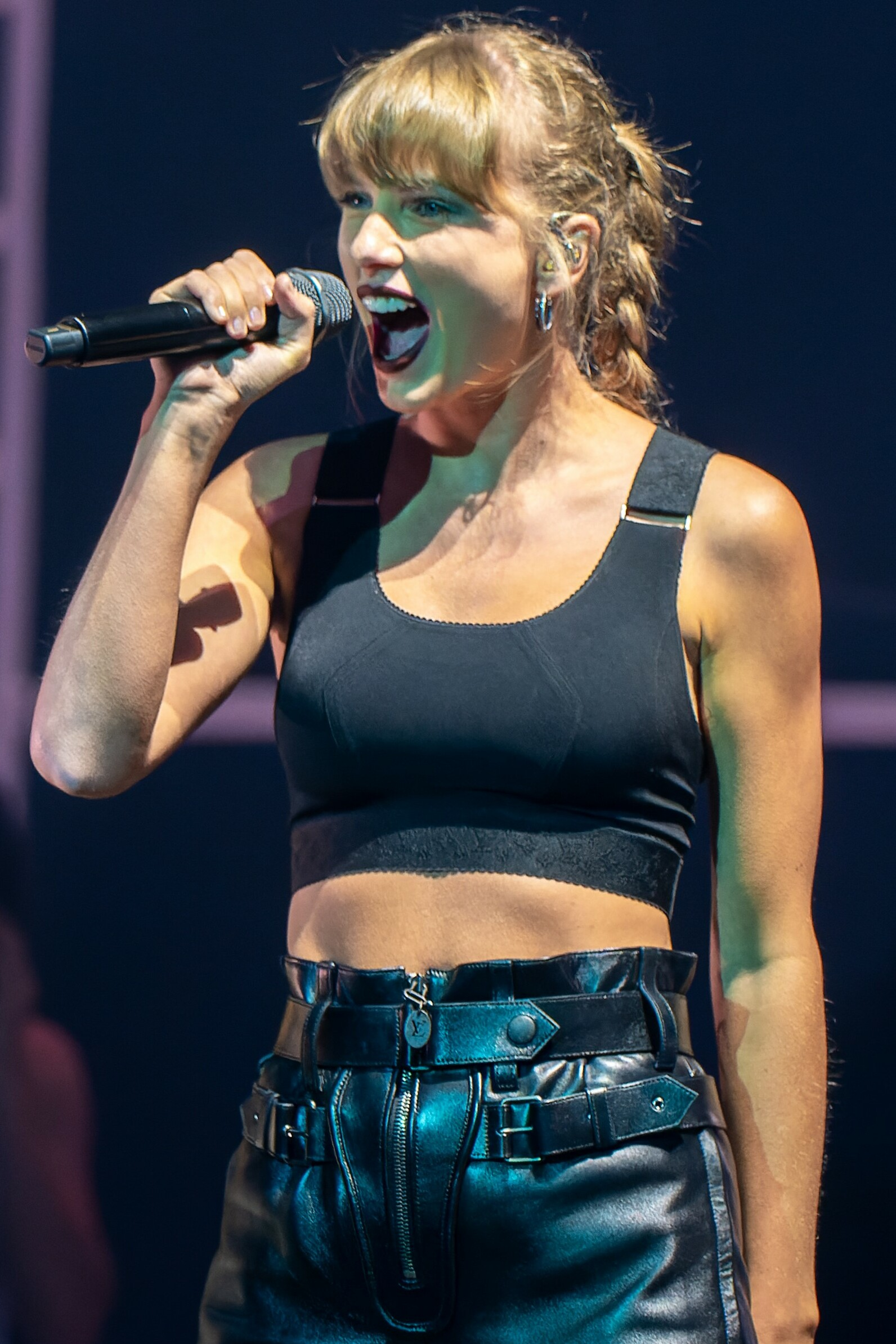
Taylor Swift in 2022

The naming of an animal species is required to comply with the guidelines established by the International Commission on Zoological Nomenclature (ICZN), which allow names that honor people, including celebrities. N. swiftae was named after American singer-songwriter Taylor Swift "in recognition of her talent as a songwriter and performer and in appreciation of the enjoyment her music has brought DAH." Hennen, the lead author of the scientist team that discovered the species, said Swift's music "helped [him] get through the highs and lows of graduate school, so naming a new millipede species after her is [his] way of saying thanks." Of the 16 new species described by Hennen, he picked N. swiftae to be named after Swift as the species is endemic to Tennessee, a state where Swift has lived. The millipede received extensive mainstream media coverage due to its name.

== Distribution ==
Nannaria swiftae is currently found only in Tennessee, a state in the United States, especially in the Appalachian counties of Cumberland, Monroe, and Van Buren.

== Habitat ==
The species has been collected from mesic forests with hemlock, maple, oak, tuliptree, witch hazel, and pine trees, at elevations ranging from 481 metres to 1539 metres.

== See also ==
- Castianeira swiftay - species of spider named after Swift
- List of organisms named after famous people
