= Barberiella =

Scientific classification
- Kingdom: Animalia
- Phylum: Arthropoda
- Clade: Pancrustacea
- Class: Insecta
- Order: Hemiptera
- Suborder: Heteroptera
- Family: Miridae
- Subfamily: Mirinae
- Tribe: Herdoniini
- Genus: Barberiella; Poppius, 1914

Genus of true bugs

Barberiella is a genus of plant bugs in the family Miridae. There are at least two described species in Barberiella.

== Species ==
These two species belong to the genus Barberiella:

- Barberiella formicoides Poppius, 1914
- Barberiella humeralis (Poppius, 1921)
