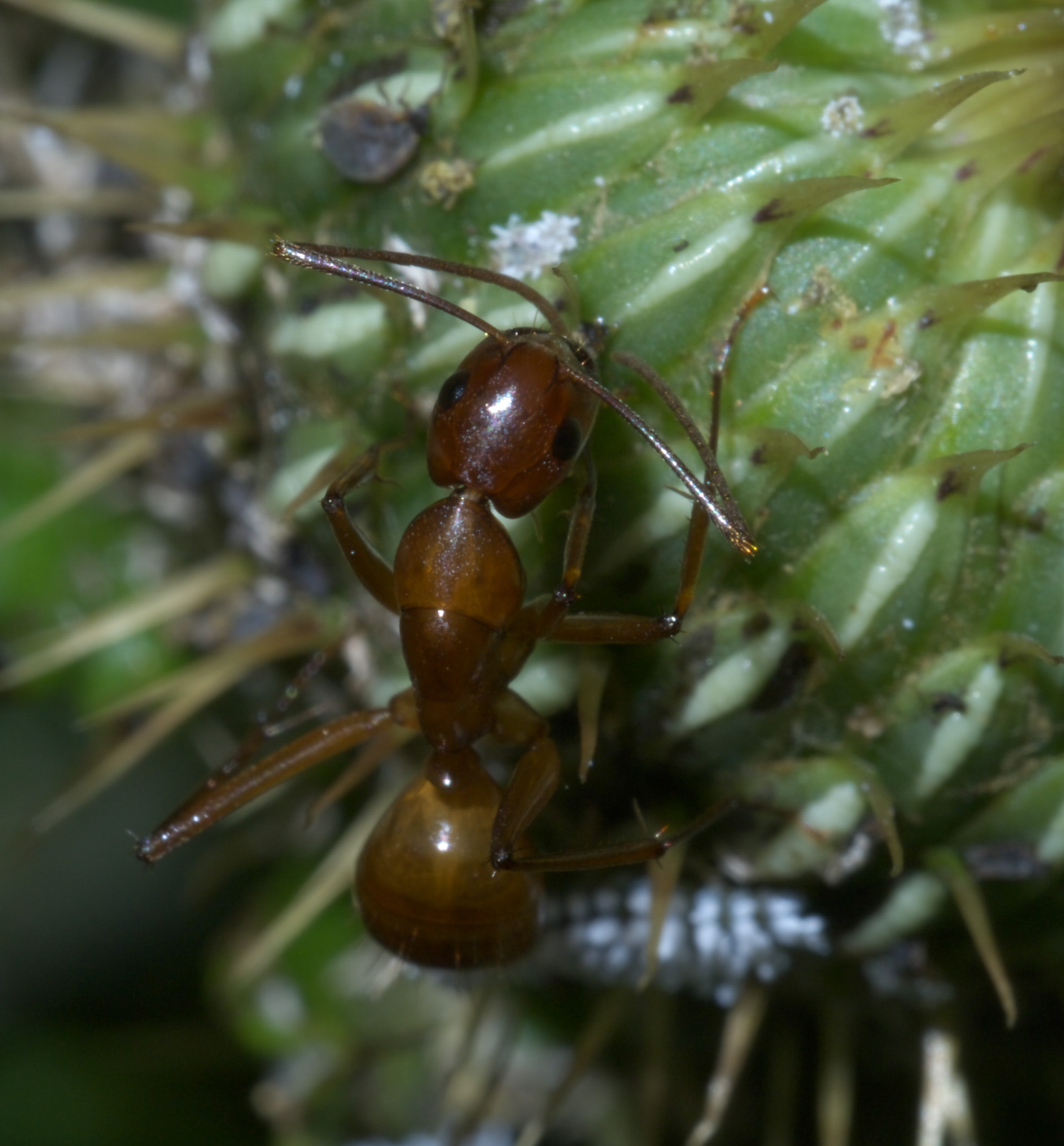

Scientific classification
- Kingdom: Animalia
- Phylum: Arthropoda
- Class: Insecta
- Order: Hymenoptera
- Family: Formicidae
- Subfamily: Formicinae
- Genus: Camponotus
- Subgenus: Camponotus
- Species: C. castaneus

Binomial name
- Camponotus castaneus (Latreille, 1802)

= Camponotus castaneus =

Species of ant

Camponotus castaneus, the red hazelnut carpenter ant, is a species of carpenter ant located in the eastern United States. It is a primarily orangish-red ant in the family Camponotus. Its workers are usually around 8-10 mm, and queens around 18-20 mm. As with most Camponotus species, C. castaneus has majors and super-majors, usually appearing in the second or third year of the colony's founding, majors are usually 10-14 mm, with super majors being around 13-17 mm. C. castaneus has a generalist diet, feeding on insects and carbohydrates such as honeydew, which is easily accessible. The ant has a smooth thorax and abdomen, with 1 node separating them.

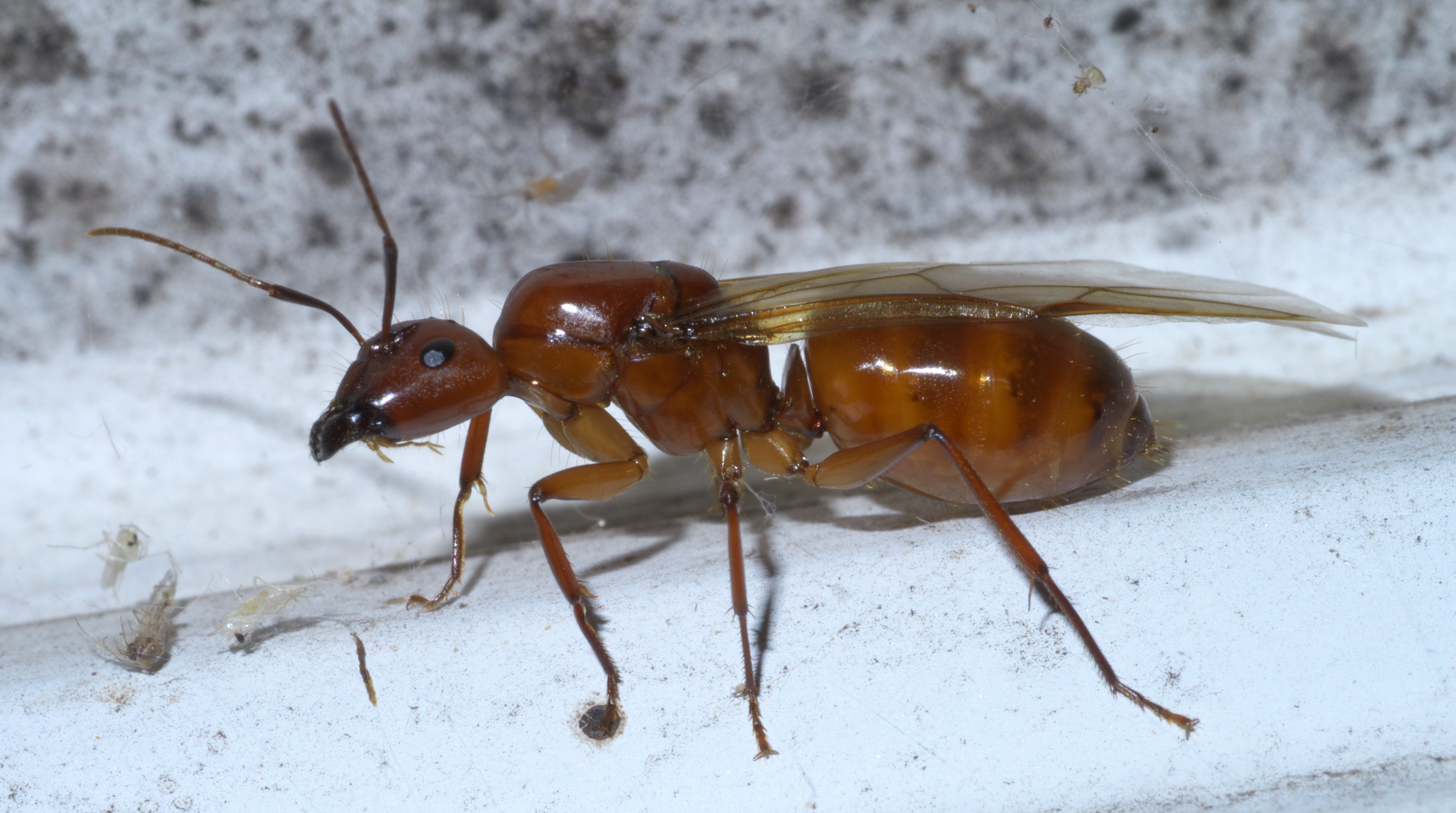
C. castaneus alate queen, side view

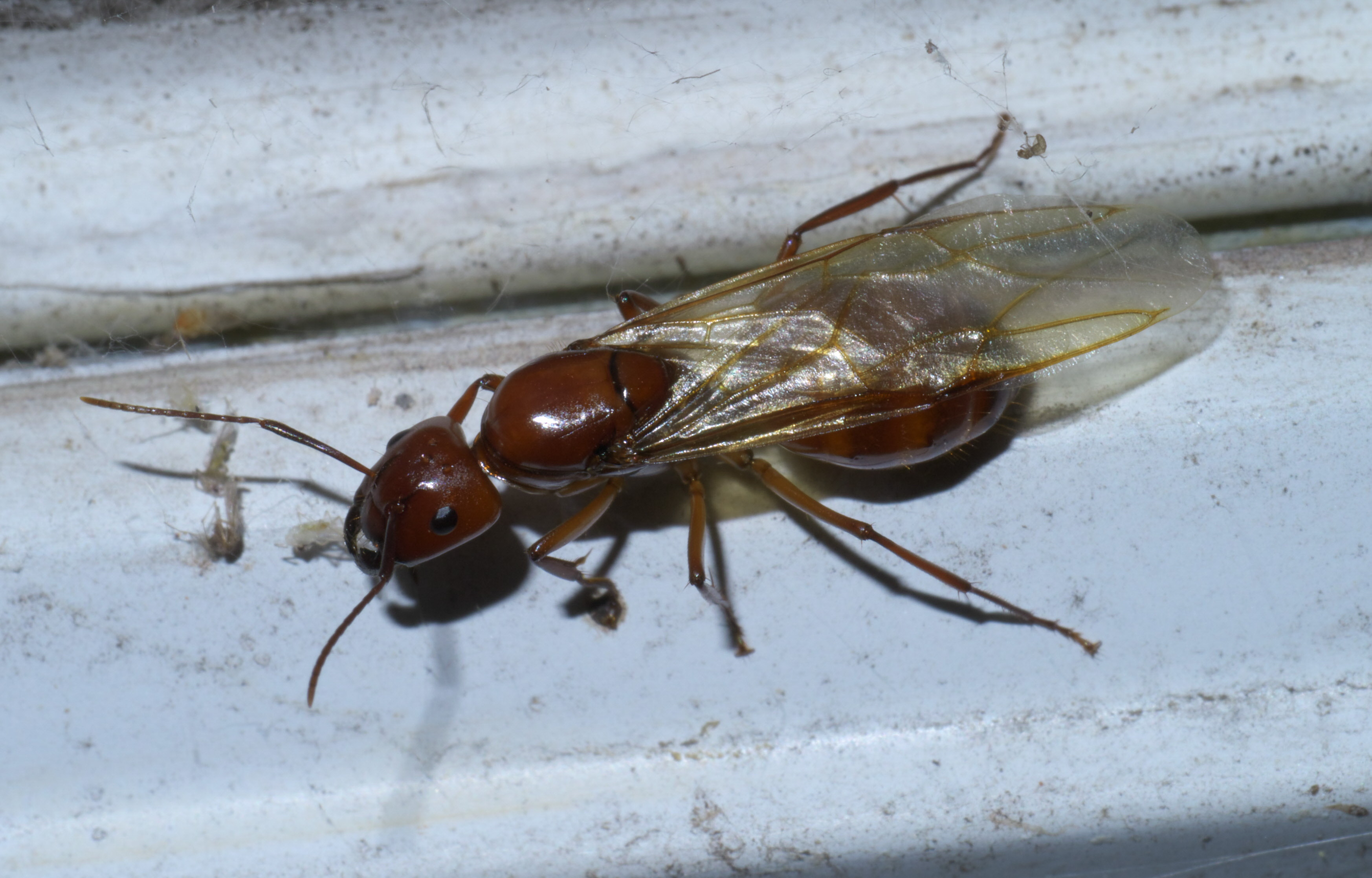
C. castaneus alate queen, top view

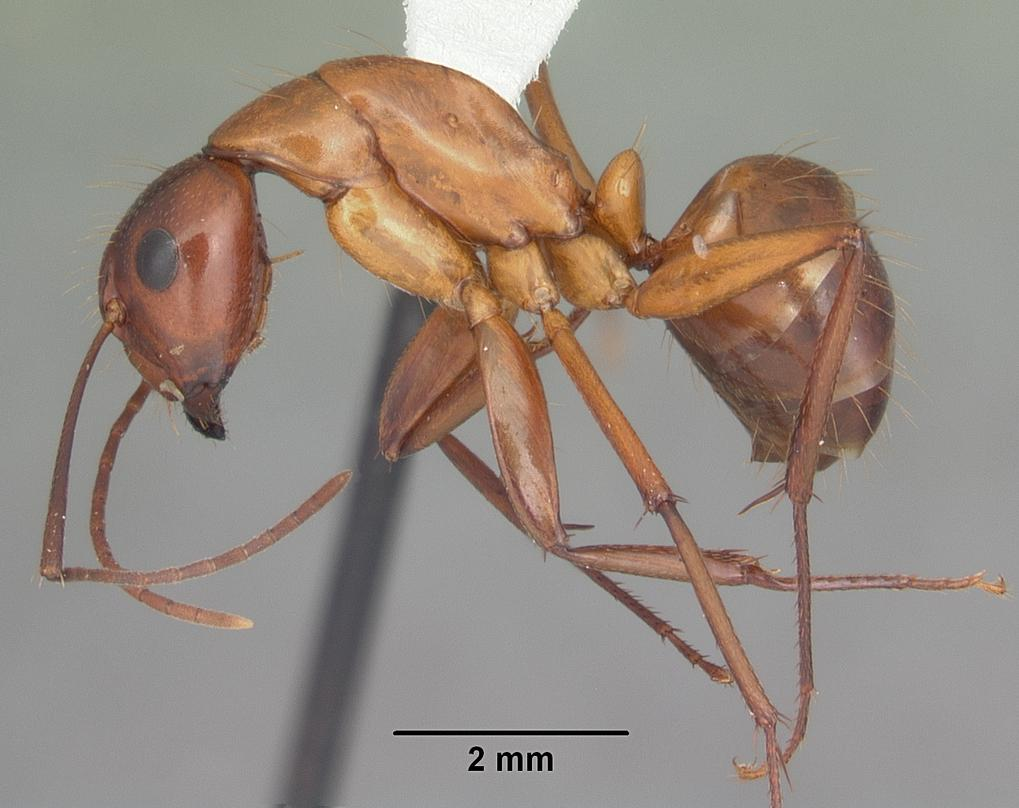
C. castaneus antweb.org specimen

== Diapause (hibernation) ==
Similar to other Camponotus, C. castaneus will go into a hibernation-like state during the winter, called diapause. Though, unlike other ants, they go into diapause very early, usually during the first cool days of fall, they stop foraging; this is usually the reason they are not seen during fall or winter. In some hot areas, such as Southern Florida, they still go through diapause during fall and winter, regardless of the temperatures.

== Development ==
Like all ants, C. castaneus has 4 life stages: egg, larva, pupa, and adult. The entire life cycle of the ant takes around 35-60 days to complete, depending on environmental factors such as heat, available resources, and humidity.

Eggs

The eggs are laid by the queen ant, who measures around 18-20 mm. Eggs are very small, usually 1-3 mm, and look like white beads. It can take up to two weeks for the larvae to hatch from them.

Larvae

Once the eggs hatch, the larvae emerge. The larval stage is the ant's longest before adulthood, lasting at least a few weeks. Unlike eggs and pupae, the hook-shaped larvae need to be fed. During diapause, developing ants are usually kept at this stage.

Pupae

Once the larvae have grown large enough, they pupate. Unlike many other ant species, the pupae of C. castaneus are not "naked" and, instead, are encased in oval cocoons which are spun around them, usually by the queen and worker ants.

== Location ==
C. castaneus is located in Eastern North America, stretching from Florida to Maine. These ants are most commonly found in rotting wood, as most Camponotus ants enjoy hollowing out this wood using their large mandibles to carve through. Unlike termites, Camponotus ants do not eat the wood, as their digestive systems are not strong enough to break it down.

== Nuptial flights ==
A nuptial flight is a mating frenzy found in some insects but also found in all winged ants. They come in different times depending on the species, and C. castaneus has nuptial flights in June and July, some queens may even be found in August, though in smaller amounts. During a nuptial flight, hundreds of alate queens and drones (males) are released into the air, in a ratio of 1:10. Usually, these queens mate with one or several males before flying to the ground, ripping off their wings, then setting out to find a good place to start a colony. This is the most common place and time queen ants die, usually to other ants that take them as prey. Nuptial flights can be of any size, with massive nuptial flights being high in the air, to tiny ones with a few queens and many males. Usually, the largest nuptial flights are at the beginning of June.

== Founding ==
Once a queen has found its founding place, it burrows into the ground or hides in a small space. Queens get stressed easily, another common way a colony will fail its founding. If a queen becomes stressed from light or vibrations, it may eat its eggs in fear. In its first year, it usually gets fewer than ten workers, due to its long incubation time, before initiating diapause.

== Lifespan ==
Generally, C. castaneus colonies have a very long maximum lifespan, a common trait in Camponotus species. Though in the wild most queens die before founding, or possibly when the colony is small, workers can live up to multiple years, and the queen can live for over a decade.

== Identification ==
C. castaneus is mostly orangish-red in color. Like all Camponotus colonies, they have a square-ish head with a smooth thorax and abdomen with 1 node separating them. They generally have darker heads; they grow darker, depending on the worker's age. Workers are usually dark orangish-red with queens being a light to dark red. Drones are very commonly a maroon color. Queens have 3 eyes on their head called ocelli, which when they had wings helped them get a better view for flying. Camponotus in general, do not have stingers, therefore do not sting.
