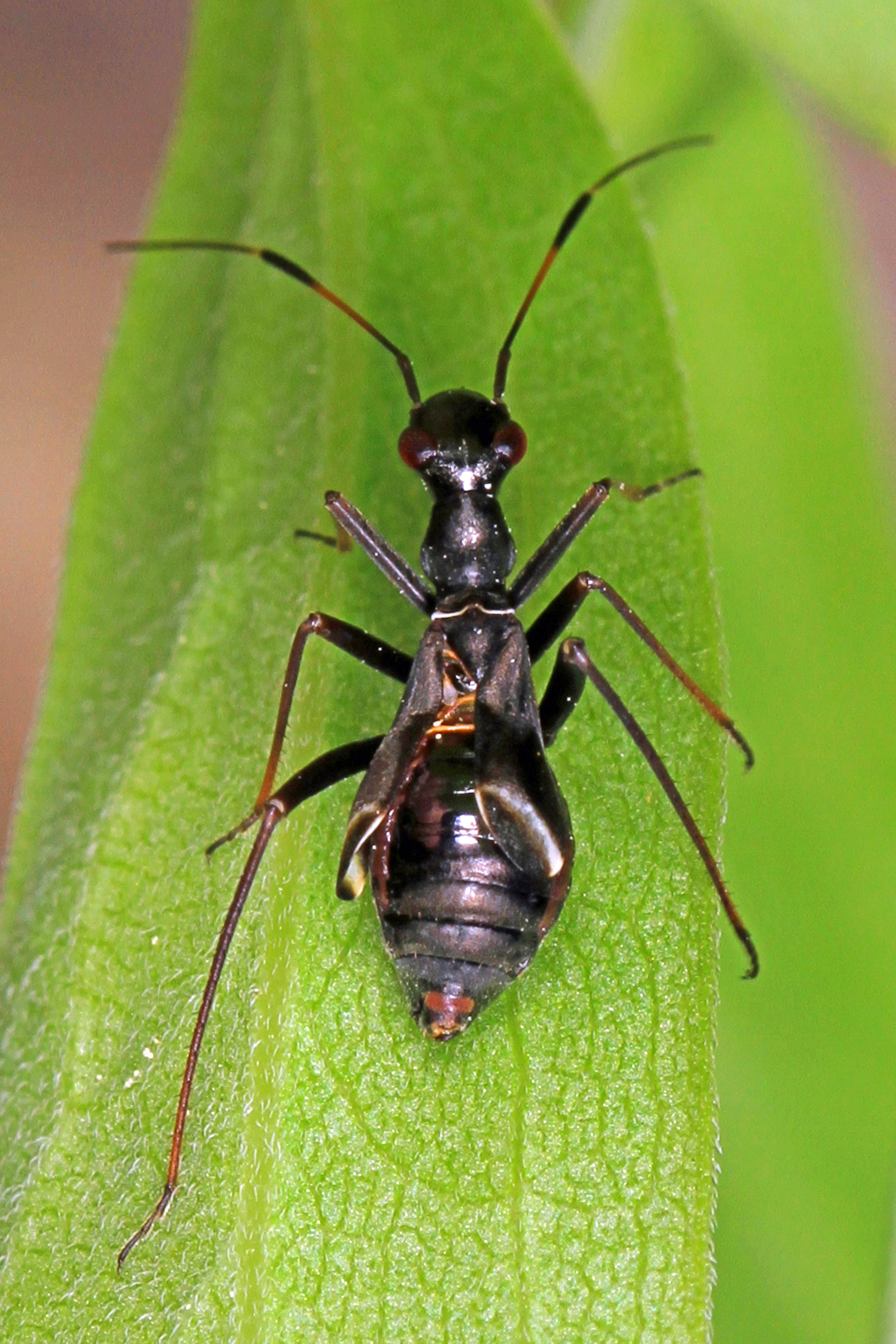
- Dacerla mediospinosa

Scientific classification
- Kingdom: Animalia
- Phylum: Arthropoda
- Clade: Pancrustacea
- Class: Insecta
- Order: Hemiptera
- Suborder: Heteroptera
- Family: Miridae
- Subfamily: Mirinae
- Tribe: Herdoniini; Distant, 1904

= Herdoniini =

Tribe of true bugs

Herdoniini is a tribe of plant bugs in the family Miridae. There are about eight genera and more than thirty described species in Herdoniini.

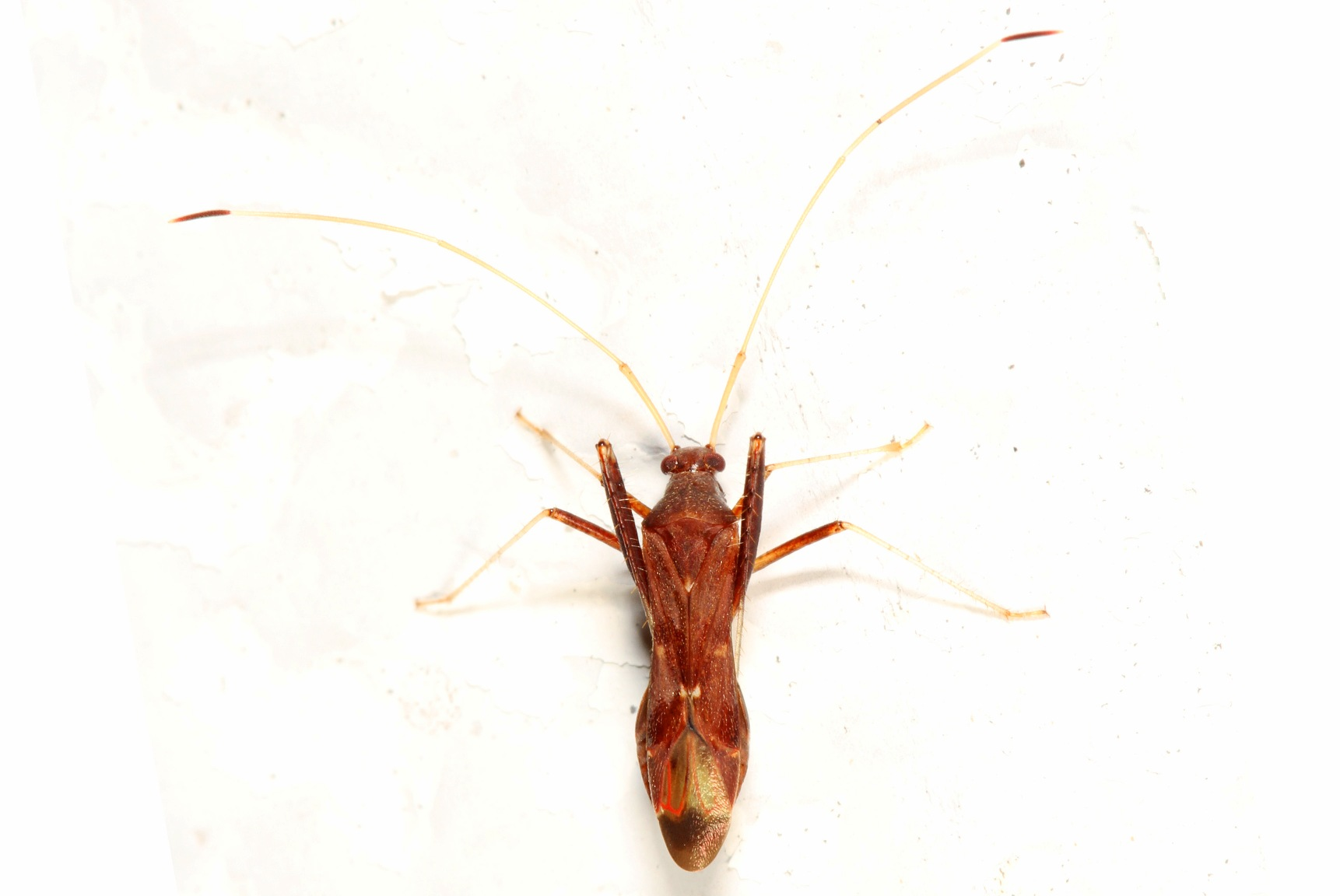
Paraxenetus guttulatus

== Genera ==
These eight genera belong to the tribe Herdoniini:

- Barberiella Poppius, 1914
- Closterocoris Uhler, 1890
- Cyphopelta Van Duzee, 1910
- Dacerla Signoret, 1881
- Heidemanniella Poppius, 1914
- Mexicomiris Carvalho & Schaffner, 1974
- Paradacerla Carvalho & Usinger, 1957
- Paraxenetus Reuter, 1907
