= List of myriapods of Sri Lanka =

Sri Lanka is a tropical island situated close to the southern tip of India. The invertebrate fauna is as large as it is common to other regions of the world. There are about 2 million species of arthropods found in the world, and still it is counting. So many new species are discover up to this time also. So it is very complicated and difficult to summarize the exact number of species found within a certain region.

The following list is about Centipedes and Millipedes found in Sri Lanka.

== Centipede ==
Phylum: Arthropoda
Subphylum: Myriapoda
Class: Chilopoda

Centipedes are arthropods belonging to the class Chilopoda of the subphylum Myriapoda. They are elongated metameric creatures with one pair of legs per body segment, where legs ranging from 30 to 354. They always have an odd number of pairs of legs. A pair of venom claws or forcipules formed from a modified first appendage, which indicated that they are predominantly carnivorous.

About 8,000 species of centipedes are thought to exist, of which 3,000 have been described.

The following list provide the centipedes currently identified in Sri Lanka. The first known study on centipedes are came from Newport on 1845. Then many more overseas biologists and naturalists did many studies on centipedes. However, much recent work and the first work by a local biologist was done by Duminda Dissanayake of Rajarata University of Sri Lanka. According to his checklist, there are 19 species from 4 orders and 6 families are known from Sri Lanka.

Endemic species are denoted as E.

=== Order: Geophilomorpha - Soil centipedes ===
==== Family: Mecistocephalidae ====
- Mecistocephalus heteropus
- Mecistocephalus subinsularis

==== Family: Oryidae ====
- Orphnaeus brevilabiatus

=== Order: Lithobiomorpha - Stone centipedes ===
==== Family: Lithobiidae ====
- Australobius palnis
- Australobius sculpturatus

=== Order: Scolopendromorpha - Bark centipedes ===
==== Family: Scolopendridae ====
- Ethmostigmus rubripes
- Otostigmus ceylonicus
- Otostigmus scaber
- Scolopendra crassa
- Scolopendra hardwickei
- Scolopendra morsitans
- Scolopendra subspinipes
- Cormocephalus inermipes
- Cormocephalus westwoodi
- Rhysida immarginata
- Rhysida longipes

=== Order: Scutigeromorpha - Common house centipedes ===
==== Family: Scutigeridae ====
- Thereuopodina tenuicornis

==== Family: Scutigerinidae ====
- Scutigerina weberi

== Millipede ==
Phylum: Arthropoda
Subphylum: Myriapoda
Class: Diplopoda

Millipedes are arthropods in the class Diplopoda, which is characterised by having two pairs of jointed legs on most body segments. Most millipedes have very elongated cylindrical or flattened bodies with more than 20 segments, while pill millipedes are shorter and can roll into a ball. The average number of legs are about 500 or so, but rarely about 750. Approximately 12,000 species classified into sixteen orders and around 140 families, making Diplopoda the largest class of myriapods.

In 1865, Humbert is the first person to study Sri Lankan millipede fauna, with 26 species, including 19 new species. In 1892, Pocock discovered 10 more new species of millipedes from many localities. With many gradual taxonomic revisions by Carl, Demange, Hoffman and endemic millipede fauna by Mauriès, a total of 104 millipede species belonging to 44 genera, 18 families and nine orders have been documented. 82 species are endemic to Sri Lanka.

=== Order: Chordeumatida ===
==== Family: Lankasomatidae ====
- Cingalosoma anderssoni - E
- Lankasoma anderssoni - E
- Lankasoma brincki - E
- Lankasoma cederholmi - E
- Lankasoma oreites - E
- Lankasoma mahleri - E

=== Order: Glomeridesmida ===
==== Family: Glomeridesmidae ====
- Termitodesmus ceylonicus - E

=== Order: Polydesmida - Flat-backed millipedes ===
==== Family: Chelodesmidae ====
- Leptodesmus thwaitesii - E

==== Family: Cryptodesmidae ====
- Pocodesmus greeni - E
- Singhalocryptus alticola - E

==== Family: Fuhrmannodesmidae ====
- Lankadesmus cognatus - E

==== Family: Paradoxosomatidae ====
- Anoplodesmus anthracinus
- Anoplodesmus humberti - E
- Anoplodesmus layardi - E
- Anoplodesmus luctuosus
- Anoplodesmus inornatus - E
- Anoplodesmus sabulosus - E
- Anoplodesmus saussurii
- Anoplodesmus stadelmanni - E
- Chondromorpha xanthotricha
- Desmoxytes planata
- Orthomorpha mikrotropis - E
- Paranedyopus simplex - E
- Polydesmopeltis kelaarti
- Pyragrogonus willeyi - E
- Singhalorthomorpha cingalensis - E
- Singhalorthomorpha serrulata - E
- Strongylosoma greeni - E
- Strongylosoma nietneri - E

==== Family: Polydesmidae ====
- Polydesmus skinneri - E

==== Family: Pyrgodesmidae ====
- Archandrodesmus kandyanus - E
- Catapyrgodesmus ceylonicus - E
- Cryptocephalopus jonesii - E
- Eustaledesmus parvus - E
- Klimakodesmus permutatus - E
- Pyrgodesmus obscurus - E
- Styloceylonius lobatus - E
- Urodesmus serratus - E

=== Order: Polyxenida - Bristle millipedes ===
==== Family: Polyxenidae ====
- Silvestrus ceylonicus - E

=== Order: Sphaerotheriida - Giant pill millipedes ===
==== Family: Arthrosphaeridae ====
- Arthrosphaera attemsi
- Arthrosphaera brandtii
- Arthrosphaera corrugata - E
- Arthrosphaera dentigera - E
- Arthrosphaera inermis
- Arthrosphaera leopardina - E
- Arthrosphaera noticeps - E
- Arthrosphaera pilifera - E
- Arthrosphaera ruginosa - E
- Arthrosphaera rugosa - E
- Arthrosphaera versicolor - E

==== Family: Zephroniidae ====
- Sphaeropoeus hercules

=== Order: Siphonophorida ===
==== Family: Siphonophoridae ====
- Pterozonium picteti
- Siphonophora humberti - E

=== Order: Spirobolida - Round-backed millipedes ===
==== Family: Pachybolidae ====
- Xenobolus carnifex

==== Family: Pseudospirobolellidae ====
- Pseudospirobolellus avernus

==== Family: Spirobolidae ====
- Spirobolus crebristriatus - E
- Spirobolus greeni - E
- Spirobolus longicollis - E
- Spirobolus longicornis - E
- Spirobolus obtusospinosus - E
- Spirobolus spirostreptinus - E
- Spirobolus taprobanensis - E

==== Family: Trigoniulidae ====
- Cingalobolus bugnioni - E
- Lankabolus coelebs - E
- Trigoniulus corallinus

=== Order: Spirostreptida ===
==== Family: Cambalopsidae ====
- Trachyjulus aelleni - E
- Trachyjulus costatus - E
- Trachyjulus humberti - E
- Trachyjulus lankanus - E
- Trachyjulus minor - E
- Trachyjulus willeyi - E
  - Trachyjulus willeyi montanus - E

==== Family: Glyphiulidae ====
- Podoglyphiulus ceylanicus - E

==== Family: Harpagophoridae ====
- Carlogonus robustior - E
- Harpurostreptus attemsi - E
- Harpurostreptus hamifer - E
- Harpurostreptus krausi
- Harpurostreptus matarae - E
- Humbertostreptus lunelii - E
- Ktenostreptus anderssoni - E
- Ktenostreptus annulipes - E
- Ktenostreptus centrurus - E
- Ktenostreptus costulatus - E
- Ktenostreptus lankaensis - E
- Ktenostreptus rugulosus - E
- Ktenostreptus specularis - E
- Leptostreptus caudiculatus
- Leptostreptus exiguus - E
- Leptostreptus fuscus - E
- Phyllogonostreptus nigrolabiatus
- Stenurostreptus stenorhynchus - E
- Thyropygus allevatus
- Thyropygus poseidon - E

==== Family: Spirostreptidae ====
- Spirostreptus contemptus - E
- Spirostreptus insculptus - E
- Spirostreptus modestus - E

=== Order: Julida ===
==== Family: Julidae ====
- Julus ceilanicus - E

=== Order: Stemmiulida ===
==== Family: Stemmiulidae ====
- Diopsiulus annandalei - E
- Diopsiulus ceylonicus - E
- Diopsiulus greeni - E
- Diopsiulus madaraszi - E
