= Thyropygus poseidon =

Scientific classification
- Kingdom: Animalia
- Phylum: Arthropoda
- Subphylum: Myriapoda
- Class: Diplopoda
- Order: Spirostreptida
- Family: Harpagophoridae
- Genus: Thyropygus
- Species: T. poseidon

Binomial name
- Thyropygus poseidon Attems, 1936

Synonyms
- Thyropisthus poseidon (Attems, 1936)

Species of millipede

Thyropygus poseidon, is a species of round-backed millipede in the family Harpagophoridae. It is endemic to Sri Lanka.
