= Arthrosphaera attemsi =

Scientific classification
- Domain: Eukaryota
- Kingdom: Animalia
- Phylum: Arthropoda
- Subphylum: Myriapoda
- Class: Diplopoda
- Order: Sphaerotheriida
- Family: Arthrosphaeridae
- Genus: Arthrosphaera
- Species: A. attemsi

Binomial name
- Arthrosphaera attemsi Jeekel, 2001

Synonyms
- Arthrosphaera inermis Attems, 1936

Species of millipede

Arthrosphaera attemsi, is a species of pill millipedes in the family Arthrosphaeridae. It is native to India and Sri Lanka.
