= Nepalella =

Scientific classification
- Kingdom: Animalia
- Phylum: Arthropoda
- Subphylum: Myriapoda
- Class: Diplopoda
- Order: Chordeumatida
- Family: Megalotylidae
- Genus: Nepalella; Shear, 1979

Type species
- Nepalella khumbua Shear, 1979

Genus of millipedes

Nepalella is a genus of millipedes in the family Megalotylidae. These millipedes are found in China, Nepal, Thailand, Myanmar, and Vietnam. With 34 described species, this genus is among the millipede genera with the greatest number of species in the Oriental realm. This genus is also notable for featuring some of the largest species in the order Chordeumatida, including one species reaching 42 mm in length.

== Distribution and habitats ==
Eighteen species of Nepalella are found in southern China, ten others in Nepal, three more in Thailand, two more in Myanmar, and one more in northern Vietnam. Most of these species are narrow endemics, known from only one locality. Most species of Nepalella are allopatric, but some syntopic or sympatric pairs have been recorded. Almost all species in this genus are found in subtropical habitats between 23.5° and 34°N in latitude, with only a few found in tropical habitats in Thailand and Vietnam.

Most species in this genus are found in montane habitats more than 800 meters above sea level. For example, many species in Nepal are found at very high elevations, from 2,200 to 3,800 meters above sea level. Only a few species in this genus are lowland species. This genus includes several species found in karst caves in southern China. These species are thought to be troglobionts, but the other species in this genus are epigean rather than cave-dwelling.

== Discovery and taxonomy ==
This genus was first proposed in 1979 by the American zoologist William A. Shear to contain two species, N. thodunga and the type species N. khumbua, both discovered in Nepal. He named this genus to recognize this country of origin. He originally described this genus under the family Conotylidae, but in 1983, the Russian zoologist Sergei I. Golovatch described a third species in this genus, N. vietnamica, discovered in Vietnam, and proposed including the genus Nepalella in the family Megalotylidae. Since then, authorities writing about Nepalella have consistently placed this genus in the family Megalotylidae. Despite this longstanding consensus in the literature, some references instead list the genus Nepalella under the family Lankasomatidae.

== Description ==
Species in this genus range from medium to large in size, from about 10 mm to 42 mm in length, and from 0.64 mm to 3.2 mm in width. The Nepalese species N. jaljalae and the Chinese species N. shimianensis are each only about 10 mm long and are notable for their relatively small sizes. The Chinese species N. grandis can reach 42 mm in length and is notable for its large size. In most Nepalella species, adults have 30 body segments (counting the collum as the first segment and the telson as the last), the number usually observed among adults in the order Chordeumatida. One Nepalese species, N. phulcokia, however, is notable for featuring adults with only 28 segments.

The third through the seventh leg pairs in males in this genus are often markedly and increasingly swollen. The eighth leg pair become anterior gonopods in males, which are reduced to only a small sternal plate featuring two lateral spikes with a lobe projecting from the middle. The ninth leg pair become posterior gonopods in males, which feature large basal elements (coxites) and distal elements (telopodites) that may be notably small. The telopodites are typically reduced to two articles with the distal article turned sharply in the dorsal direction. The tenth and sometimes the eleventh leg pair in males feature coxal glands.

Like males in the genus Megalotyla, the only other genus in the family Megalotylidae, males in the genus Nepalella feature markedly reduced anterior gonopods. The anterior gonopods in the genus Nepalella can be distinguished from those in the genus Megalotyla, however, by the presence of lateral spikes. These spikes are entirely absent from the anterior gonopods in the genus Megalotyla.

== Species ==
This genus includes the following species:

- Nepalella birmanica Mauriès, 1988
- Nepalella brevichaeta Mikhaljova, 2022
- Nepalella caeca Shear, 1999
- Nepalella deharvengi Mauriès, 1988
- Nepalella fruticulosa Mikhaljova, 2022
- Nepalella gairiensis Mauriès, 1988
- Nepalella grandis Golovatch, Geoffroy & Mauriès, 2006
- Nepalella grandoides Golovatch, Geoffroy & Mauriès, 2006
- Nepalella griswoldi Shear, 2002
- Nepalella gunsa Shear, 1987
- Nepalella helii Liu, in Zhao et al. 2021
- Nepalella inthanonae Mauriès, 1988
- Nepalella jaljalae Mauriès, 1988
- Nepalella jinfoshan Liu, in Liu et al. 2017
- Nepalella kavanaughi Shear, 2002
- Nepalella khumbua Shear, 1979
- Nepalella labolensis Mikhaljova, 2022
- Nepalella lobata Liu, in Liu et al. 2017
- Nepalella magna Shear, 2002
- Nepalella marmorata Golovatch, Geoffroy & Mauriès, 2006
- Nepalella pallida Mauriès, 1988
- Nepalella phulcokia Mauriès, 1988
- Nepalella pianma Shear, 2002
- Nepalella ringmoensis Mauriès, 1988
- Nepalella shimianensis Mikhaljova, 2022
- Nepalella siamensis Likhitrakarn, Golovatch, Panha, 2021
- Nepalella taiensis Mauriès, 1988
- Nepalella taplejunga Shear, 1987
- Nepalella thodunga Shear, 1979
- Nepalella tragsindola Mauriès, 1988
- Nepalella troglodytes Liu, in Liu et al. 2017
- Nepalella vietnamica Golovatch, 1983
- Nepalella wangi Liu, in Liu et al. 2017
- Nepalella zhumanica Mikhaljova, 2022
