= Arthrosphaera brandtii =

Scientific classification
- Domain: Eukaryota
- Kingdom: Animalia
- Phylum: Arthropoda
- Subphylum: Myriapoda
- Class: Diplopoda
- Order: Sphaerotheriida
- Family: Arthrosphaeridae
- Genus: Arthrosphaera
- Species: A. brandtii

Binomial name
- Arthrosphaera brandtii (Humbert, 1865)

Synonyms
- Arthrosphaera brandti (Humbert, 1865); Arthrosphaera chitonoides (Butler, 1872); Sphaeropoeus brandtii (Humbert, 1865); Zephronia brandti Humbert, 1865; Zephronia brandtii Humbert, 1865; Zephronia chitinoides Butler, 1872; Zephronia chitonoides Butler, 1872

Species of millipede

Arthrosphaera brandtii, the Tanzanian pill bug millipede, is a species of pill millipede in the family Arthrosphaeridae. It is found in many African and Asian countries including India and Sri Lanka. Mature individuals of the species reach 3–4 cm in length. Adults are pale brown in colour with black lines in between the segments, whereas juveniles are dark brown. The species is one of the most commonly kept giant pill millipede species within the exotic pet keeping hobby. An introduced population of Arthrosphaera brandtii exists on the Usambara Mountains of Tanzania.
