= Podoglyphiulus ceylanicus =

Scientific classification
- Kingdom: Animalia
- Phylum: Arthropoda
- Subphylum: Myriapoda
- Class: Diplopoda
- Order: Spirostreptida
- Family: Cambalopsidae
- Genus: Podoglyphiulus
- Species: P. ceylanicus

Binomial name
- Podoglyphiulus ceylanicus (Attems, 1909)

Synonyms
- Glyphiulus ceylanicus Attems, 1909

Species of millipede

Podoglyphiulus ceylanicus is a species of round-backed millipede in the family Glyphiulidae. It is endemic to Sri Lanka.
