= Arthrosphaera leopardina =

Scientific classification
- Kingdom: Animalia
- Phylum: Arthropoda
- Subphylum: Myriapoda
- Class: Diplopoda
- Order: Sphaerotheriida
- Family: Arthrosphaeridae
- Genus: Arthrosphaera
- Species: A. leopardina

Binomial name
- Arthrosphaera leopardina (Butler, 1872)

Synonyms
- Zephronia leopardina Butler, 1872

Species of millipede

Arthrosphaera leopardina, is a species of pill millipede in the family Arthrosphaeridae. It is endemic to Sri Lanka.
