= Arthrosphaera rugosa =

Scientific classification
- Kingdom: Animalia
- Phylum: Arthropoda
- Subphylum: Myriapoda
- Class: Diplopoda
- Order: Sphaerotheriida
- Family: Arthrosphaeridae
- Genus: Arthrosphaera
- Species: A. rugosa

Binomial name
- Arthrosphaera rugosa Verhoeff, 1930

Species of millipede

Arthrosphaera rugosa, is a species of pill millipede in the family Arthrosphaeridae. It is endemic to Sri Lanka.
