= Spirobolus greeni =

Scientific classification
- Kingdom: Animalia
- Phylum: Arthropoda
- Subphylum: Myriapoda
- Class: Diplopoda
- Order: Spirobolida
- Family: Spirobolidae
- Genus: Spirobolus
- Species: S. greeni

Binomial name
- Spirobolus greeni Pocock, 1892

Synonyms
- Lankabolus greeni (Pocock, 1892); Lankabolus greeni Hoffman, 1962

Species of millipede

Spirobolus greeni, is a species of round-backed millipede in the family Spirobolidae. It is endemic to Sri Lanka, first found from Pundaloya, Nuwara Eliya.
