= Arthrosphaera inermis =

Scientific classification
- Domain: Eukaryota
- Kingdom: Animalia
- Phylum: Arthropoda
- Subphylum: Myriapoda
- Class: Diplopoda
- Order: Sphaerotheriida
- Family: Arthrosphaeridae
- Genus: Arthrosphaera
- Species: A. inermis

Binomial name
- Arthrosphaera inermis (Humbert, 1865)

Synonyms
- Sphaeropoeus inermis Humbert, 1865; Zephronia inermis (Humbert, 1865)

Species of millipede

Arthrosphaera inermis, is a species of pill millipede in the family Arthrosphaeridae. It is native to India and Sri Lanka.
