= Nepalella phulcokia =

Scientific classification
- Kingdom: Animalia
- Phylum: Arthropoda
- Subphylum: Myriapoda
- Class: Diplopoda
- Order: Chordeumatida
- Family: Megalotylidae
- Genus: Nepalella
- Species: N. phulcokia

Binomial name
- Nepalella phulcokia Mauriès, 1988

Species of millipede

Nepalella phulcokia is a species of millipede in the family Megalotylidae. This millipede is found in Nepal. This millipede is notable as the only species in the genus Nepalella with only 28 body segments (counting the collum as the first segment and the telson as the last) in adults rather than the 30 segments usually observed in the order Chordeumatida.

== Discovery ==
This species was first described in 1988 by the French myriapodologist Jean-Paul Mauriès of the Muséum National d'Histoire Naturelle in Paris. He based the original description of this species on a male holotype, a female allotype, and two female paratypes. These type specimens were collected at very high elevations in the district of Kathmandu in Nepal in 1983. The holotype was found at 2,250 meters above sea level, and the other three specimens were found at 2,650 meters above sea level. One paratype is deposited in the Muséum National d'Histoire Naturelle, and the other three type specimens are deposited in the Museum de Genève.

== Description ==
This millipede has a light yellowish beige body with a brown head and brown antennae. The male holotype measures 12 mm in length and 1 mm in width, whereas the female specimens are larger, ranging from 13 mm to 13.5 mm in length and from 1.3 mm to 1.4 mm in width. Unlike all other Nepalese species of Nepalella, this species features an almost cylindrical body, with no trace of paranota. Each eye is a pigmented triangular field of 18 or 19 ocelli arranged in seven rows.

This species features only 28 body segments (including the telson) in adults. Accordingly, the adult female has only 46 pairs of legs, and the adult male has only 44 pairs of walking legs, excluding the eighth and ninth leg pairs, which become gonopods. The anterior gonopods in the male are reduced to a simple sternal plate featuring two small lateral spikes with a small transverse plate projecting from the sternum in between. Each of the posterior gonopods features a large basal element (coxite) and a distal element (telopodite) that is reduced to two articles with the distal article turned toward the dorsal direction. The coxite of each posterior gonopod takes the form of a simple blade that is less complex than the coxites observed in other Nepalella species.

The adult male of this species shares many traits with the adult males of other Nepalella species. For example, as in many other species in this genus, the third through seventh leg pairs in the male of this species are thicker than the other legs. Furthermore, as in other species in this genus, the anterior gonopods in this species are reduced to a sternal plate featuring two lateral spikes with a lamellate lobe in the middle. Moreover, as in other species in this genus, the posterior gonopods in this species feature large coxites and telopodites reduced to two articles with the distal article turned in the dorsal direction. This species can be distinguished from all other Nepalella species, however, based on the number of body segments in adults. Whereas the adults of all other species in this genus have 30 segments, the adults of this species feature only 28 segments.
