= Chondromorpha kelaarti =

Scientific classification
- Kingdom: Animalia
- Phylum: Arthropoda
- Subphylum: Myriapoda
- Class: Diplopoda
- Order: Polydesmida
- Family: Paradoxosomatidae
- Genus: Chondromorpha
- Species: C. kelaarti

Binomial name
- Chondromorpha kelaarti (Humbert, 1865)

Synonyms
- Anoplodesmus kelaarti (Humbert, 1865); Chondromorpha kelaarti (Humbert, 1865); Polydesmopeltis kelaarti (Humbert, 1865); Polydesmus kelaarti Humbert, 1865

Species of millipede

Chondromorpha kelaarti is a species of millipedes in the family Pyrgodesmidae. It is native to Sri Lanka and India. Three subspecies recognized. It is found from grass fields rich in organic matter and damp bricks with favorable shady conditions.

== Subspecies ==
- Chondromorpha kelaarti kelaarti (Humbert, 1865)
- Chondromorpha kelaarti longipes Verhoeff, 1936
- Chondromorpha kelaarti valparaiensis Carl, 1932
