= Klimakodesmus permutatus =

Scientific classification
- Kingdom: Animalia
- Phylum: Arthropoda
- Subphylum: Myriapoda
- Class: Diplopoda
- Order: Polydesmida
- Family: Pyrgodesmidae
- Genus: Klimakodesmus
- Species: K. permutatus

Binomial name
- Klimakodesmus permutatus Attems, 1940

Species of millipede

Klimakodesmus permutatus is a species of millipedes in the family Pyrgodesmidae. It is endemic to Sri Lanka.
