= Urodesmus serratus =

Scientific classification
- Kingdom: Animalia
- Phylum: Arthropoda
- Subphylum: Myriapoda
- Class: Diplopoda
- Order: Polydesmida
- Family: Pyrgodesmidae
- Genus: Urodesmus
- Species: U. serratus

Binomial name
- Urodesmus serratus Verhoeff, 1936

Species of millipede

Urodesmus serratus is a species of millipede in the family Pyrgodesmidae. It is endemic to Sri Lanka.
