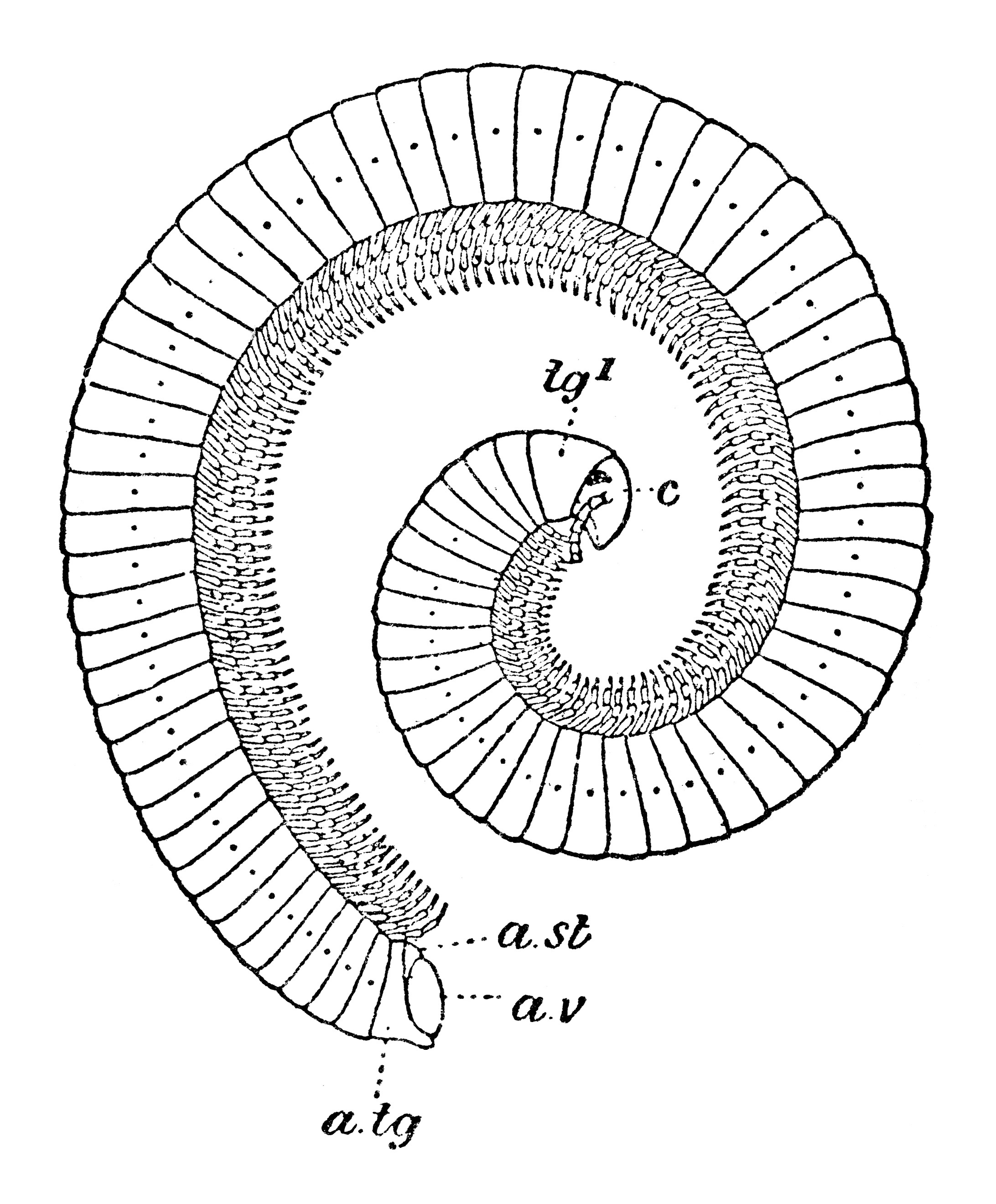
- Spirostreptus vittatus

Scientific classification
- Kingdom: Animalia
- Phylum: Arthropoda
- Subphylum: Myriapoda
- Class: Diplopoda
- Order: Spirostreptida
- Family: Harpagophoridae
- Subfamily: Rhynchoproctinae
- Genus: Anurostreptus; Attems, 1914

= Anurostreptus =

Genus of millipedes

Anurostreptus is a genus of millipedes within the family Harpagophoridae. Members of this genus can be found in Southeast Asia.

== Genera ==
- Anurostreptus alticinctus (Karsch, 1881)
- Anurostreptus amphibolius (Karsch, 1881)
- Anurostreptus barthelemyae Demange, 1961
- Anurostreptus commutatus Demange, 1961
- Anurostreptus longispinus Demange, 1961
- Anurostreptus macrodontus Attems, 1942
- Anurostreptus modiglianii (Silvestri, 1895)
- Anurostreptus sculptus Demange, 1961
- Anurostreptus vittatus (Newport, 1844)
