= Diopsiulus ceylonicus =

Scientific classification
- Kingdom: Animalia
- Phylum: Arthropoda
- Subphylum: Myriapoda
- Class: Diplopoda
- Order: Stemmiulida
- Family: Stemmiulidae
- Genus: Diopsiulus
- Species: D. ceylonicus

Binomial name
- Diopsiulus ceylonicus (Pocock, 1892)

Synonyms
- Stemmiulus ceylonicus Pocock, 1892

Species of millipede

Diopsiulus ceylonicus is a species of millipede in the family Stemmiulidae. It is endemic to Sri Lanka.
