= Cryptocephalopus =

Scientific classification
- Kingdom: Animalia
- Phylum: Arthropoda
- Subphylum: Myriapoda
- Class: Diplopoda
- Order: Polydesmida
- Family: Pyrgodesmidae
- Genus: Cryptocephalopus; Verhoeff, 1937
- Species: C. jonesii

Binomial name
- Cryptocephalopus jonesii Verhoeff, 1937

Genus of millipedes

Cryptocephalopus jonesii is a species of millipedes in the family Pyrgodesmidae. It is endemic to Sri Lanka. It is the only species in the genus Cryptocephalopus.
