= Leptostreptus fuscus =

Scientific classification
- Kingdom: Animalia
- Phylum: Arthropoda
- Subphylum: Myriapoda
- Class: Diplopoda
- Order: Spirostreptida
- Family: Harpagophoridae
- Genus: Leptostreptus
- Species: L. fuscus

Binomial name
- Leptostreptus fuscus Attems, 1936

Species of millipede

Leptostreptus fuscus is a species of round-backed millipede in the family Harpagophoridae. It is endemic to Sri Lanka.
