= Singhalorthomorpha =

Scientific classification
- Domain: Eukaryota
- Kingdom: Animalia
- Phylum: Arthropoda
- Subphylum: Myriapoda
- Class: Diplopoda
- Order: Polydesmida
- Family: Paradoxosomatidae
- Genus: Singhalorthomorpha; Attems, 1914

Genus of millipedes

Singhalorthomorpha is a genus of millipedes belonging to the family Paradoxosomatidae.

Species:

- Singhalorthomorpha cingalensis (Humbert, 1865)
- Singhalorthomorpha serrulata (Attems, 1931)
- Singhalorthomorpha skinneri (Humbert, 1865)
