= Ktenostreptus centrurus =

Scientific classification
- Kingdom: Animalia
- Phylum: Arthropoda
- Subphylum: Myriapoda
- Class: Diplopoda
- Order: Spirostreptida
- Family: Harpagophoridae
- Genus: Ktenostreptus
- Species: K. centrurus

Binomial name
- Ktenostreptus centrurus (Pocock, 1882)

Synonyms
- Spirostreptus centrurus Pocock, 1882

Species of millipede

Ktenostreptus centrurus is a species of round-backed millipede in the family Harpagophoridae. It is endemic to Sri Lanka.
