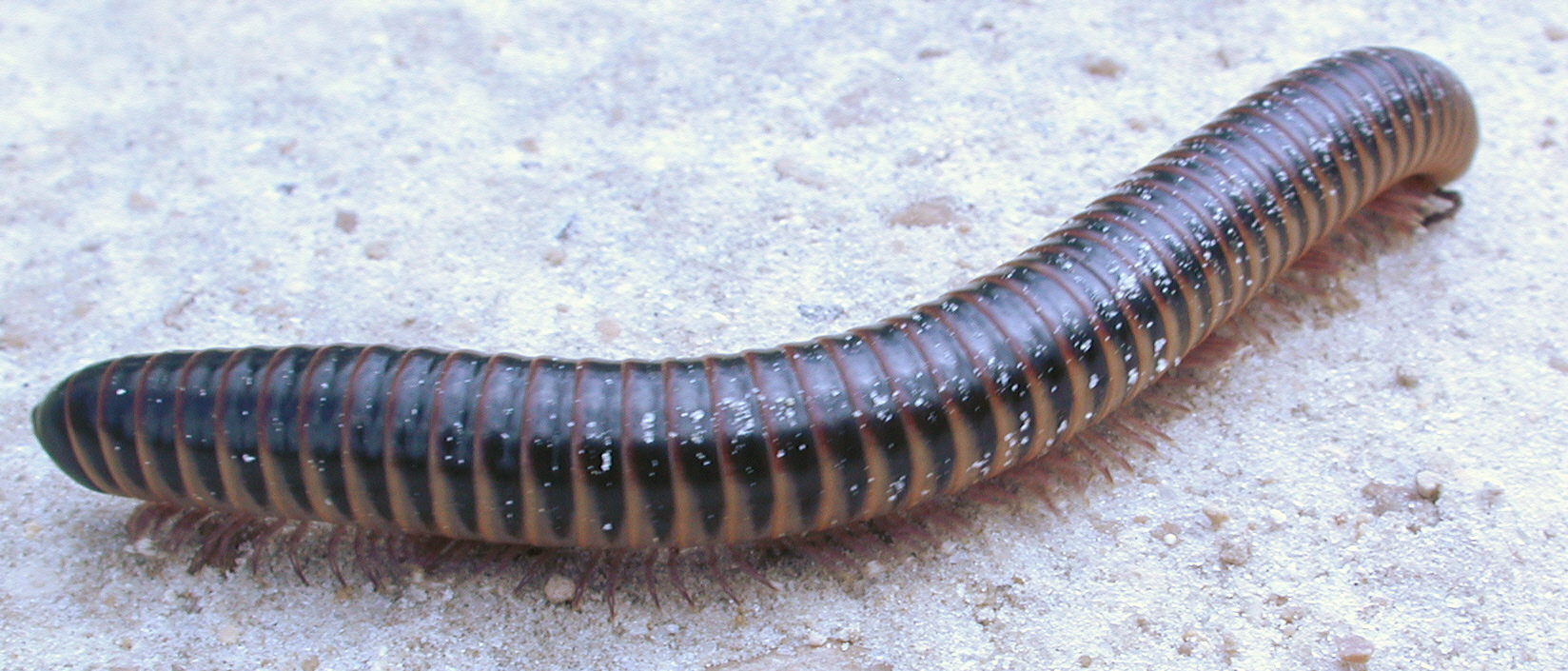

Scientific classification
- Domain: Eukaryota
- Kingdom: Animalia
- Phylum: Arthropoda
- Subphylum: Myriapoda
- Class: Diplopoda
- Order: Spirobolida
- Family: Spirobolidae
- Genus: Chicobolus; Chamberlin, 1947
- Species: C. spinigerus

Binomial name
- Chicobolus spinigerus (Wood, 1864)

Synonyms
- Spirobolus spinigerus Wood, 1864; Spirobolus bahamiensis Bollman, 1893; Spirobolus paludis Chamberlin, 1918, Chicobolus pilsbryi Chamberlin, 1947; Incobolus thaumastus Chamberlin, 1955; Chicobolus jucundus Causey, 1955

= Chicobolus =

Species of millipede

Chicobolus spinigerus, commonly known as the ivory millipede or Florida ivory millipede, is a millipede species native to the southeastern United States, occurring throughout the Florida Peninsula and Panhandle, as well as southern Alabama, Georgia, and South Carolina. Males normally range from 40 to 85 mm (1.6 to 3.3 in) long, females up to 90 mm (3.5 in). It is the only species in the genus Chicobolus.
