= Trachyjulus minor =

Scientific classification
- Kingdom: Animalia
- Phylum: Arthropoda
- Subphylum: Myriapoda
- Class: Diplopoda
- Order: Spirostreptida
- Family: Cambalopsidae
- Genus: Trachyjulus
- Species: T. minor

Binomial name
- Trachyjulus minor Silvestri, 1923

Synonyms
- Trachyiulus minor Silvestri, 1923; Trachyjulus ceylanicus minor Silvestri, 1923

Species of millipede

Trachyjulus minor is a species of round-backed millipede in the family Cambalopsidae. It is endemic to Sri Lanka.
