= Diopsiulus madaraszi =

Scientific classification
- Kingdom: Animalia
- Phylum: Arthropoda
- Subphylum: Myriapoda
- Class: Diplopoda
- Order: Stemmiulida
- Family: Stemmiulidae
- Genus: Diopsiulus
- Species: D. madaraszi

Binomial name
- Diopsiulus madaraszi Silvestri, 1916

Species of millipede

Diopsiulus madaraszi is a species of millipede in the family Stemmiulidae. It is endemic to Sri Lanka.
