= Ktenostreptus annulipes =

Scientific classification
- Kingdom: Animalia
- Phylum: Arthropoda
- Subphylum: Myriapoda
- Class: Diplopoda
- Order: Spirostreptida
- Family: Harpagophoridae
- Genus: Ktenostreptus
- Species: K. annulipes

Binomial name
- Ktenostreptus annulipes Attems, 1909

Species of millipede

Ktenostreptus annulipes is a species of round-backed millipedes in the family Harpagophoridae. It is endemic to Sri Lanka.
