= Megalotylidae =

Scientific classification
- Kingdom: Animalia
- Phylum: Arthropoda
- Subphylum: Myriapoda
- Class: Diplopoda
- Order: Chordeumatida
- Superfamily: Heterochordeumatoidea
- Family: Megalotylidae; Golovatch, 1978

Family of millipedes

Megalotylidae is a family of millipedes belonging to the order Chordeumatida. This family includes 36 species in two genera. These millipedes are found from the Himalayas to the Russian Far East and southeast Asia. This family is notable for including some of the largest species in the order Chordeumatida, including one species (Nepalella grandis) reaching 42 mm in length.

== Taxonomy ==
The Russian zoologist Sergei I. Golovatch first proposed this family in 1978 to contain the newly discovered genus Megalotyla. In 1979, the American zoologist William A. Shear originally described the genus Nepalella under the family Conotylidae, but in 1983, Golovatch proposed including this genus in the family Megalotylidae instead. Since then, authorities writing about the genus Nepalella have consistently placed this genus in the family Megalotylidae. Despite this longstanding consensus in the literature, some references instead list the genus Nepalella under the family Lankasomatidae.

== Distribution ==
The genus Megalotyla includes two species found in the Russian Far East and North Korea. The genus Nepalella contains 34 species with a more southern distribution: Eighteen species of Nepalella are found in southern China, ten others in Nepal, three more in Thailand, two more in Myanmar, and one more in northern Vietnam.

== Description ==
Millipedes in this family, including the genus Nepalella as well as the genus Megalotyla, range from 10 mm to 42 mm in length. Adults have either 28 or 30 segments (counting the collum as the first segment and the telson as the last). The anterior gonopods in this family are markedly reduced, sometimes leaving only the sternum.

The two genera in this family are distinguished by the degree to which the anterior gonopods are reduced. In the genus Nepalella, these gonopods are reduced to a small central sternum with two lateral spikes. In the genus Megalotyla, the sternal plate is larger, but the lateral spikes are entirely absent.

== Genera ==
This family includes two genera:

- Megalotyla Golovatch & Mikhaljova, 1978
- Nepalella Shear, 1979
