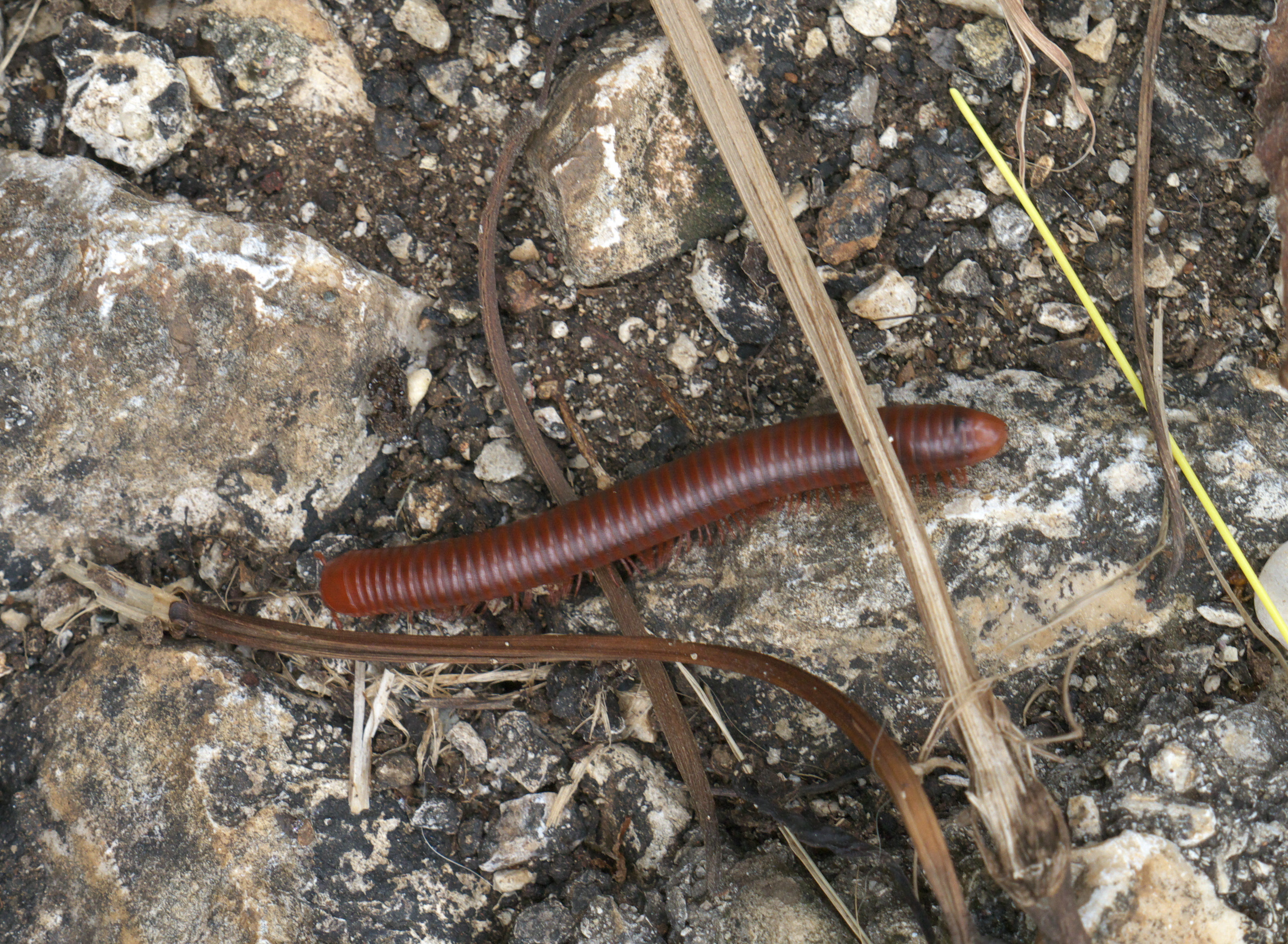
- Trigoniulus corallinus

Scientific classification
- Domain: Eukaryota
- Kingdom: Animalia
- Phylum: Arthropoda
- Subphylum: Myriapoda
- Class: Diplopoda
- Order: Spirobolida
- Family: Trigoniulidae
- Genus: Trigoniulus; Pocock, 1894

= Trigoniulus =

Genus of millipedes

Trigoniulus is a genus of millipede in the family Trigoniulidae. There are at least 90 described species in Trigoniulus.

== Species ==
These 90 species belong to the genus Trigoniulus:

- Trigoniulus abbreviatus Silvestri, 1895
- Trigoniulus ambonensis Attems, 1898
- Trigoniulus amnestus Chamberlin, 1945
- Trigoniulus andropygus Attems, 1917
- Trigoniulus badius Attems, 1897
- Trigoniulus barbouri Chamberlin, 1920
- Trigoniulus bitaeniatus Carl, 1912
- Trigoniulus blainvillii (Le Guillou, 1841)
- Trigoniulus brachycerus Silvestri, 1899
- Trigoniulus brachyurus Attems, 1897
- Trigoniulus burnetticus Attems, 1898
- Trigoniulus caeruleocinctus Chamberlin, 1920
- Trigoniulus caerulocinctus Chamberlin, 1920
- Trigoniulus castaneus Attems, 1915
- Trigoniulus caudatus Attems, 1932
- Trigoniulus charactopygus Attems, 1930
- Trigoniulus comma Attems, 1898
- Trigoniulus concolor Silvestri, 1895
- Trigoniulus corallinus (Gervais, 1847) (rusty millipede)
- Trigoniulus corallipes Pocock, 1896
- Trigoniulus demissus Silvestri, 1899
- Trigoniulus densestriatis Attems, 1897
- Trigoniulus densestriatus Attems, 1897
- Trigoniulus digitulus (Brölemann, 1913)
- Trigoniulus docens Wang
- Trigoniulus erythropisthus Attems, 1898
- Trigoniulus erythropus (Tömösváry, 1885)
- Trigoniulus eurhabdotus Chamberlin, 1920
- Trigoniulus flavipes Attems, 1897
- Trigoniulus formosus Silvestri, 1895
- Trigoniulus frater Chamberlin, 1918
- Trigoniulus garmani Chamberlin, 1918
- Trigoniulus goesi (Porat, 1876)
- Trigoniulus gracilis Silvestri, 1899
- Trigoniulus harpagus Attems, 1917
- Trigoniulus hebes Verhoeff, 1928
- Trigoniulus hemityphlus Verhoeff, 1924
- Trigoniulus heteropus Silvestri, 1899
- Trigoniulus incommodus Carl, 1912
- Trigoniulus insculptus Verhoeff, 1924
- Trigoniulus karykinus Attems, 1897
- Trigoniulus klossi Hirst, 1914
- Trigoniulus laminifer Wang, 1951
- Trigoniulus lawrencei Verhoeff, 1939
- Trigoniulus lissonotus Attems, 1927
- Trigoniulus lumbricinus (Gerstäcker, 1873)
- Trigoniulus macropygus Silvestri, 1897
- Trigoniulus major Chamberlin, 1921
- Trigoniulus melanotelus Chamberlin, 1921
- Trigoniulus montium Verhoeff, 1928
- Trigoniulus niger Takakuwa, 1940
- Trigoniulus obscurus Silvestri, 1899
- Trigoniulus orinomus Attems, 1897
- Trigoniulus ornatus Silvestri, 1895
- Trigoniulus orphinus Attems, 1897
- Trigoniulus oyhinu Attems
- Trigoniulus palaoensis Takakuwa, 1940
- Trigoniulus papuasiae Silvestri, 1895
- Trigoniulus parvulus Attems, 1897
- Trigoniulus philippinus Chamberlin, 1921
- Trigoniulus phranus (Karsch, 1881)
- Trigoniulus placidus Attems, 1930
- Trigoniulus pleuralis Carl, 1912
- Trigoniulus proximus Silvestri, 1895
- Trigoniulus pulcherrimus Pocock, 1898
- Trigoniulus ralumensis Attems, 1914
- Trigoniulus remotus Chamberlin, 1918
- Trigoniulus reonus Pocock, 1895
- Trigoniulus riseri Chamberlin
- Trigoniulus rubrocinctus Chamberlin, 1920
- Trigoniulus ruspolii Silvestri, 1896
- Trigoniulus sanguinemaculatus Silvestri, 1897
- Trigoniulus scaphurus Pocock, 1906
- Trigoniulus segmentatus Takakuwa, 1940
- Trigoniulus sericatus Carl, 1912
- Trigoniulus soleatus Attems, 1897
- Trigoniulus squamifer Attems, 1931
- Trigoniulus squamosus Carl, 1912
- Trigoniulus straeleni Attems, 1932
- Trigoniulus tachypus Pocock, 1894
- Trigoniulus tahitianus Chamberlin, 1920
- Trigoniulus takahasii Takakuwa, 1940
- Trigoniulus targionii Silvestri, 1897
- Trigoniulus ternatensis Chamberlin, 1920
- Trigoniulus tertius Takakuwa, 1940
- Trigoniulus toriii Takakuwa, 1940
- Trigoniulus utagalus Chamberlin, 1947
- Trigoniulus variabilis Attems, 1953
- Trigoniulus venatorius Silvestri, 1899
- Trigoniulus veteranus Attems, 1932
