= Eustaledesmus =

Scientific classification
- Kingdom: Animalia
- Phylum: Arthropoda
- Subphylum: Myriapoda
- Class: Diplopoda
- Order: Polydesmida
- Family: Pyrgodesmidae
- Genus: Eustaledesmus; Silvestri, 1920
- Species: E. parvus

Binomial name
- Eustaledesmus parvus Silvestri, 1920

Genus of millipedes

Eustaledesmus parvus is a species of millipede in the family Pyrgodesmidae. It is endemic to Sri Lanka. It is the only species in the genus Eustaledesmus.
