= Thyropygus allevatus =

Scientific classification
- Kingdom: Animalia
- Phylum: Arthropoda
- Subphylum: Myriapoda
- Class: Diplopoda
- Order: Spirostreptida
- Family: Harpagophoridae
- Genus: Thyropygus
- Species: T. allevatus

Binomial name
- Thyropygus allevatus (Karsch, 1881)

Synonyms
- Spirostreptus allevatus Karsch, 1881; Spirostreptus bowringi Pocock, 1892; Spirostreptus bowringii Pocock, 1892; Spirostreptus kandyanus Humbert, 1866; Thyropisthus allevatus (Karsch, 1881); Thyropisthus bowringi (Pocock, 1892); Thyropisthus bowringii (Pocock, 1892); Thyropisthus polyodontus Attems, 1942

Species of millipede

Thyropygus allevatus, the Siamese pointy-tailed millipede, is a species of round-backed millipede in the family Harpagophoridae. It is found in Sri Lanka, Thailand and Vietnam.
