= Pyrgodesmus =

Scientific classification
- Kingdom: Animalia
- Phylum: Arthropoda
- Subphylum: Myriapoda
- Class: Diplopoda
- Order: Polydesmida
- Family: Pyrgodesmidae
- Genus: Pyrgodesmus; Pocock, 1892
- Species: P. obscurus

Binomial name
- Pyrgodesmus obscurus Pocock, 1892

Genus of millipedes

Pyrgodesmus obscurus is a species of millipede in the family Pyrgodesmidae. It is endemic to Sri Lanka. It is the only species in the genus Pyrgodesmus.
