= Harpurostreptus =

Scientific classification
- Kingdom: Animalia
- Phylum: Arthropoda
- Subphylum: Myriapoda
- Class: Diplopoda
- Order: Spirostreptida
- Family: Harpagophoridae
- Subfamily: Harpagophorinae
- Tribe: Harpurostreptini
- Genus: Harpurostreptus; Attems, 1936

Synonyms
- Indiothauma Verhoeff, 1938

Genus of millipedes

Harpurostreptus is a genus of millipedes in the family Harpagophoridae.

== Species ==
Species accepted as of May 2025:

- Harpurostreptus attemsi Carl, 1941
- Harpurostreptus jonesi (Verhoeff, 1938)
- Harpurostreptus krausi Demange, 1962
- Harpurostreptus matarae Carl, 1941
- Harpurostreptus montivagus Carl, 1941
- Harpurostreptus prasadani Demange, 1989
