= Cryptocorypha kandyanus =

Scientific classification
- Kingdom: Animalia
- Phylum: Arthropoda
- Subphylum: Myriapoda
- Class: Diplopoda
- Order: Polydesmida
- Family: Pyrgodesmidae
- Genus: Cryptocorypha
- Species: C. kandyanus

Binomial name
- Cryptocorypha kandyanus (Carl, 1932)

Synonyms
- Archandrodesmus kandyanus Carl, 1932; Ceyloncarlia kandyanus (Carl, 1932)

Species of millipede

Cryptocorypha kandyanus is a species of millipede in the family Pyrgodesmidae. It is endemic to Sri Lanka.
