= Ktenostreptus costulatus =

Scientific classification
- Kingdom: Animalia
- Phylum: Arthropoda
- Subphylum: Myriapoda
- Class: Diplopoda
- Order: Spirostreptida
- Family: Harpagophoridae
- Genus: Ktenostreptus
- Species: K. costulatus

Binomial name
- Ktenostreptus costulatus Attems, 1913

Synonyms
- Ktenostreptus scaberrimus Verhoeff, 1930

Species of millipede

Ktenostreptus costulatus is a species of round-backed millipede in the family Harpagophoridae. It is endemic to Sri Lanka.
