= Catapyrgodesmus =

Scientific classification
- Kingdom: Animalia
- Phylum: Arthropoda
- Subphylum: Myriapoda
- Class: Diplopoda
- Order: Polydesmida
- Family: Pyrgodesmidae
- Genus: Catapyrgodesmus; Silvestri, 1920
- Species: C. ceylonicus

Binomial name
- Catapyrgodesmus ceylonicus Silvestri, 1920

Genus of millipedes

Catapyrgodesmus ceylonicus is a species of millipedes in the family Pyrgodesmidae. It is the only species in the genus Catopyrgodesmus. It is endemic to Sri Lanka.
