= Leptostreptus caudiculatus =

Scientific classification
- Kingdom: Animalia
- Phylum: Arthropoda
- Subphylum: Myriapoda
- Class: Diplopoda
- Order: Spirostreptida
- Family: Harpagophoridae
- Genus: Leptostreptus
- Species: L. caudiculatus

Binomial name
- Leptostreptus caudiculatus (Karsch, 1881)

Synonyms
- Leptostreptus caudatus Carl, 1941; Spirostreptus caudiculatus Karsch, 1881

Species of millipede

Leptostreptus caudiculatus is a species of round-backed millipede in the family Harpagophoridae. It is native to India (madras) and Sri Lanka (Rambodde, Pundaluoya, Balangoda).
