= Harpurostreptus krausi =

Scientific classification
- Kingdom: Animalia
- Phylum: Arthropoda
- Subphylum: Myriapoda
- Class: Diplopoda
- Order: Spirostreptida
- Family: Harpagophoridae
- Genus: Harpurostreptus
- Species: H. krausi

Binomial name
- Harpurostreptus krausi Demange, 1962

Species of millipede

Harpurostreptus krausi, is a species of round-backed millipede in the family Harpagophoridae. It is native to the Uttaranchal area of India and Sri Lanka.
