= Trachyjulus =

Scientific classification
- Kingdom: Animalia
- Phylum: Arthropoda
- Subphylum: Myriapoda
- Class: Diplopoda
- Order: Spirostreptida
- Family: Cambalopsidae
- Subfamily: Cambalopsinae
- Genus: Trachyjulus; Peters, 1864

Synonyms
- Cambalopsis Pocock, 1895; Paratrachiulus Verhoeff, 1936; Phanolene Chamberlin, 1950; Trachyiulus auct. (Peters, 1864)

Genus of millipedes

Trachyjulus is a genus of millipedes in the family Cambalopsidae.

== Species ==
Species accepted as of May 2025:

- Trachyjulus aelleni Mauriès, 1982
- Trachyjulus annectens (Silvestri, 1923)
- Trachyjulus beroni Golovatch, Geoffroy, Mauriès & VandenSpiegel, 2012
- Trachyjulus butteli (Carl, 1922)
- Trachyjulus calvus (Pocock, 1893)
- Trachyjulus cavernicola (Pocock, 1894)
- Trachyjulus ceylanicus Peters, 1864
- Trachyjulus costatus (Verhoeff, 1936)
- Trachyjulus dentatus (Pocock, 1894)
- Trachyjulus fissispinus (Attems, 1931)
- Trachyjulus heteropus (Silvestri, 1923)
- Trachyjulus humberti Carl, 1911
- Trachyjulus lankanus Mauriès, 1981
- Trachyjulus magnus Likhitrakarn, Golovatch, Jeratthitikul, Srisonchai, Sutcharit & Panha, 2020
- Trachyjulus mimus Silvestri, 1924
- Trachyjulus minor (Silvestri, 1923)
- Trachyjulus modestior (Silvestri, 1923)
- Trachyjulus modiglianii Silvestri, 1895
- Trachyjulus pauper (Silvestri, 1923)
- Trachyjulus phylloides Golovatch, Geoffroy, Mauriès & VandenSpiegel, 2012
- Trachyjulus proximatus (Silvestri, 1923)
- Trachyjulus rivicola (Attems, 1931)
- Trachyjulus silvestrii Hoffman, 1977
- Trachyjulus simulans (Carl, 1941)
- Trachyjulus singularis (Attems, 1938)
- Trachyjulus subcalvus Golovatch, Geoffroy, Mauriès & VandenSpiegel, 2012
- Trachyjulus tjampeanus (Attems, 1903)
- Trachyjulus unciger Golovatch, Geoffroy, Mauriès & VandenSpiegel, 2012
- Trachyjulus willeyi (Carl, 1941)
- Trachyjulus wilsonae (Mauriès, 1983)
