= Pseudospirobolellus avernus =

Scientific classification
- Kingdom: Animalia
- Phylum: Arthropoda
- Subphylum: Myriapoda
- Class: Diplopoda
- Order: Spirobolida
- Family: Pseudospirobolellidae
- Genus: Pseudospirobolellus
- Species: P. avernus

Binomial name
- Pseudospirobolellus avernus (Butler, 1876)

Synonyms
- Azygobolus tumidus Loomis, 1934; Pseudospirobolellus bulbiferus (Attems, 1903); Spirobolellus bulbiferus (Attems, 1903); Spirobolus bulbiferus Attems, 1903; Spirostreptus avernus Butler, 1876

Species of millipede

Pseudospirobolellus avernus is a species of millipede in the family Pseudospirobolellidae. It is found in Comoros, Java, Samoa, Sulawesi, Vietnam, and South Asia. It is introduced to Caribbean Islands.
