= Chondromorpha =

Scientific classification
- Kingdom: Animalia
- Phylum: Arthropoda
- Subphylum: Myriapoda
- Class: Diplopoda
- Order: Polydesmida
- Family: Paradoxosomatidae
- Subfamily: Paradoxosomatinae
- Tribe: Sulciferini
- Genus: Chondromorpha; Silvestri, 1897

Genus of millipedes

Chondromorpha is a genus of millipedes belonging to the family Paradoxosomatidae.

The species of this genus are found in Southeastern Asia, Central America.

Species:

- Chondromorpha atopus (Chamberlin, 1920)
- Chondromorpha clarus (Chamberlin, 1920)
- Chondromorpha granosa (Attems, 1913)
- Chondromorpha granulata (Loomis, 1948)
- Chondromorpha indus (Chamberlin, 1920)
- Chondromorpha kaimura Turk, 1947
- Chondromorpha kelaarti (Humbert, 1865)
- Chondromorpha mammifera Attems, 1936
- Chondromorpha severini Silvestri, 1897
- Chondromorpha stadelmanni (Verhoeff, 1930)
- Chondromorpha xanthotricha (Attems, 1898)
