= Singhalocryptus alticola =

Scientific classification
- Kingdom: Animalia
- Phylum: Arthropoda
- Subphylum: Myriapoda
- Class: Diplopoda
- Order: Polydesmida
- Family: Cryptodesmidae
- Genus: Singhalocryptus
- Species: S. alticola

Binomial name
- Singhalocryptus alticola Hoffman, 1977

Species of millipede

Singhalocryptus alticola is a species of millipede in the family Cryptodesmidae. It is endemic to Sri Lanka.
