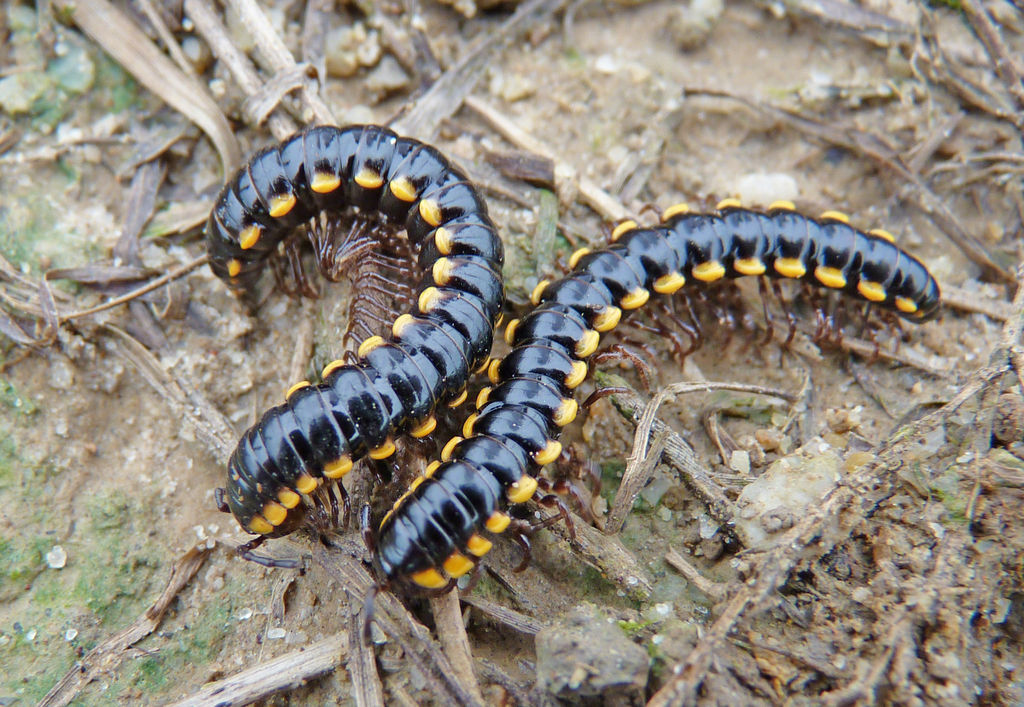
- Anoplodesmus anthracinus

Scientific classification
- Kingdom: Animalia
- Phylum: Arthropoda
- Subphylum: Myriapoda
- Class: Diplopoda
- Order: Polydesmida
- Family: Paradoxosomatidae
- Subfamily: Paradoxosomatinae
- Tribe: Sulciferini
- Genus: Anoplodesmus; Pocock, 1895

Type species
- Anoplodesmus anthracinus

Synonyms
- Sulciferus Attems, 1898; Paranedyopus Carl, 1932; Himantogonus Carl, 1932; Akribosoma Carl, 1935; Jonespeltis Verhoeff, 1936

= Anoplodesmus =

Genus of millipedes

Anoplodesmus is a genus of millipedes. It is one of the most species rich genera in the family Paradoxosomatidae, with over 40 described species distributed from India and Nepal to China and Southeast Asia, as well as the Mascarene Islands and Fiji.

== Species ==
- Anoplodesmus affinis (Golovatch, 1990)
- Anoplodesmus anichkini Golovatch & Semenyuk, 2010
- Anoplodesmus anthracinus Pocock, 1895
- Anoplodesmus aspinosus Chen, Golovatch, Mikhajlova & Chang, 2010
- Anoplodesmus attemsi Verhoeff, 1930
- Anoplodesmus attemsii Verhoeff, 1930
- Anoplodesmus borealis Nguyen, 2010
- Anoplodesmus chinensis Golovatch, 2013
- Anoplodesmus cylindricus (Carl, 1935)
- Anoplodesmus dasys (Chamberlin, 1920)
- Anoplodesmus dyscheres Attems, 1898
- Anoplodesmus elongissimus (Golovatch, 1984)
- Anoplodesmus humberti (Carl, 1902)
- Anoplodesmus inornatus (Humbert, 1865)
- Anoplodesmus insignis Attems, 1936
- Anoplodesmus kathanus (Chamberlin, 1921)
- Anoplodesmus kelaarti (Humbert, 1865)
- Anoplodesmus layardi (Humbert, 1865)
- Anoplodesmus loebli Golovatch, 2000
- Anoplodesmus luctuosus (Peters, 1864)
- Anoplodesmus magnus Golovatch, 2015
- Anoplodesmus malayanus Golovatch, 1993
- Anoplodesmus martensi (Golovatch, 1990)
- Anoplodesmus mirabilis Golovatch, VandenSpiegel & Semenyuk, 2016
- Anoplodesmus obesus Pocock, 1895
- Anoplodesmus perplexus (Golovatch, 1993)
- Anoplodesmus pinguis Pocock, 1895
- Anoplodesmus rufocinctus (Carl, 1932)
- Anoplodesmus sabulosus Attems, 1898
- Anoplodesmus saussurii (Humbert, 1865)
- Anoplodesmus schawalleri (Golovatch, 1990)
- Anoplodesmus similis (Golovatch, 1990)
- Anoplodesmus simplex (Humbert, 1865)
- Anoplodesmus solenophorus Nguyen, 2010
- Anoplodesmus solitarius Carl, 1909
- Anoplodesmus spectabilis (Karsch, 1881)
- Anoplodesmus spiniger Chen, Golovatch, Mikhajlova & Chang, 2010
- Anoplodesmus splendidus (Verhoeff, 1936)
- Anoplodesmus striolatus Pocock, 1895
- Anoplodesmus subcylindricus (Carl, 1932)
- Anoplodesmus tanjoricus (Pocock, 1892)
- Anoplodesmus tarmani Mršić, 1996
- Anoplodesmus thwaitesii (Humbert, 1865)
- Anoplodesmus ursula (Attems, 1936)
