= Diopsiulus =

Scientific classification
- Kingdom: Animalia
- Phylum: Arthropoda
- Subphylum: Myriapoda
- Class: Diplopoda
- Order: Stemmiulida
- Family: Stemmiulidae
- Genus: Diopsiulus; Silvestri, 1897

Synonyms
- Paurochaeturus Silvestri, 1916; Plusiochaeturus Silvestri, 1916

Genus of millipedes

Diopsiulus is a genus of millipedes in the family Stemmiulidae.

== Species ==
Species accepted as of May 2025:

- Diopsiulus annandalei Silvestri, 1916
- Diopsiulus biroi Silvestri, 1916
- Diopsiulus ceylonicus (Pocock, 1892)
- Diopsiulus giffardii Silvestri, 1916
- Diopsiulus greeni Carl, 1941
- Diopsiulus jeekeli Mauriès, 1982
- Diopsiulus madaraszi Silvestri, 1916
- Diopsiulus parvulus Silvestri, 1899
- Diopsiulus pencillatus (Cook, 1895)
- Diopsiulus remifer Demange & Mauriès, 1975
- Diopsiulus schioetzae Mauriès, 1979
