= Trigoniulus corallinus =

- Rusty Millipede on Mexican Heather plant

Scientific classification
- Kingdom: Animalia
- Phylum: Arthropoda
- Subphylum: Myriapoda
- Class: Diplopoda
- Order: Spirobolida
- Family: Trigoniulidae
- Genus: Trigoniulus
- Species: T. corallinus

Binomial name
- Trigoniulus corallinus (Gervais, 1842)

Synonyms
- Iulus corallines Gervais, 1842; Iulus sumatrensis Gervais, 1847; Spirostreptus sanguineus (Koch, 1863); Spirobolus lumbricinus Gerstaecker, 1873; Spirobolus goësi Porat, 1876; Spirobolus cinctures Porat, 1876; Spirobolus rugosus Voges, 1878; Spirobolus detornatus Karsch, 1881; Spirobolus punctiplenus Karsch, 1881; Spirobolus signifer Karsch, 1881; Spirobolus decoratus Karsch, 1881; Spirobolus phranus Karsch, 1881; Spirobolus punctidives Karsch, 1881; Trigoniulus sanguineus Tömösváry, 1885; Spirobolus dominicae Pocock, 1888; Spirobolus surinamensis Bollman, 1893; Trigoniulus goësi (Porat, 1876); Trigoniulus goesii (Porat, 1876); Spirobolus dorso-punctatus Saussure & Zehntner, 1897; Spirobolus sanctaeluciae Bollman, 1888; Spirobolus sanguineus C. L. Koch, 1847; Trigoniulus goesi (Porat, 1876); Spirobolus (Trigoniulus) goesi Porat, 1876; Trigoniulus lumbricinus (Gerstaecker, 1873)

Species of millipede

Trigoniulus corallinus, sometimes called the rusty millipede or common Asian millipede, is a species of millipede widely distributed in the Indo-Malayan region including India, Bangladesh, Sri Lanka, China, Taiwan, Philippines, Myanmar, Thailand, Vietnam, Malaysia, Brunei, Singapore, Nepal, and much of Indonesia. It is also reported from Fiji, Tanzania and Zambia, and found in South Asia and the Caribbean as an introduced species. It has also been introduced to Florida, and as of 2022 is well-distributed throughout South and Central Florida, with limited sightings in the Northeast and Panhandle.

T. corallinus is 2–3 in (50–75 mm) at adult size, and reddish brown in color.

These millipedes inhabit moist areas, especially rotten wood, and compost during monsoon season. The genome of T. corallinus was sequenced in 2015, the first time this has been done for a millipede.
