= Trachyjulus lankanus =

Scientific classification
- Kingdom: Animalia
- Phylum: Arthropoda
- Subphylum: Myriapoda
- Class: Diplopoda
- Order: Spirostreptida
- Family: Cambalopsidae
- Genus: Trachyjulus
- Species: T. lankanus

Binomial name
- Trachyjulus lankanus Mauriès, 1981

Synonyms
- Trachyiulus lankanus Mauriès, 1981

Species of millipede

Trachyjulus lankanus is a species of round-backed millipede in the family Cambalopsidae. It is endemic to Sri Lanka.
