= Trachyjulus willeyi =

Scientific classification
- Kingdom: Animalia
- Phylum: Arthropoda
- Subphylum: Myriapoda
- Class: Diplopoda
- Order: Spirostreptida
- Family: Cambalopsidae
- Genus: Trachyjulus
- Species: T. willeyi

Binomial name
- Trachyjulus willeyi (Carl, 1941)

Synonyms
- Trachyiulus humberti willeyi Carl, 1941; Trachyiulus willeyi (Carl, 1941); Trachyjulus humberti willeyi Carl, 1941

Species of millipede

Trachyjulus willeyi is a species of round-backed millipede in the family Cambalopsidae. It is endemic to Sri Lanka. One subspecies is recognized, Trachyjulus willeyi montanus Mauriès, 1982
