= Carlogonus robustior =

Scientific classification
- Kingdom: Animalia
- Phylum: Arthropoda
- Subphylum: Myriapoda
- Class: Diplopoda
- Order: Spirostreptida
- Family: Harpagophoridae
- Genus: Carlogonus
- Species: C. robustior

Binomial name
- Carlogonus robustior (Attems, 1936)

Synonyms
- Harpurostreptus robustior Attems, 1936

Species of millipede

Carlogonus robustior, is a species of round-backed millipede in the family Harpagophoridae. It is endemic to Sri Lanka.
