= Cingalobolus bugnioni =

Scientific classification
- Kingdom: Animalia
- Phylum: Arthropoda
- Subphylum: Myriapoda
- Class: Diplopoda
- Order: Spirobolida
- Family: Pachybolidae
- Genus: Cingalobolus
- Species: C. bugnioni

Binomial name
- Cingalobolus bugnioni Carl, 1918

Species of millipede

Cingalobolus bugnioni, is a species of round-backed millipede in the family Trigoniulidae. It is endemic to Sri Lanka.
