= Trachyjulus costatus =

Scientific classification
- Kingdom: Animalia
- Phylum: Arthropoda
- Subphylum: Myriapoda
- Class: Diplopoda
- Order: Spirostreptida
- Family: Cambalopsidae
- Genus: Trachyjulus
- Species: T. costatus

Binomial name
- Trachyjulus costatus (Verhoeff, 1936)

Synonyms
- Trachyiulus costatus Verhoeff, 1936; Trachyjulus ceylanicus costatus Verhoeff, 1936

Species of millipede

Trachyjulus costatus is a species of round-backed millipede in the family Cambalopsidae. It is endemic to Sri Lanka.
