= Leptostreptus =

Scientific classification
- Kingdom: Animalia
- Phylum: Arthropoda
- Subphylum: Myriapoda
- Class: Diplopoda
- Order: Spirostreptida
- Family: Harpagophoridae
- Subfamily: Harpagophorinae
- Tribe: Ktenostreptini
- Genus: Leptostreptus; Attems, 1936

Genus of millipedes

Harpurostreptus is a genus of millipedes in the family Harpagophoridae.

== Species ==
Species accepted as of May 2025:

- Leptostreptus caudiculatus (Karsch, 1881)
- Leptostreptus exiguus (Attems, 1950)
- Leptostreptus fuscus Attems, 1936
