= Lankasoma cederholmi =

Scientific classification
- Kingdom: Animalia
- Phylum: Arthropoda
- Subphylum: Myriapoda
- Class: Diplopoda
- Order: Chordeumatida
- Family: Lankasomatidae
- Genus: Lankasoma
- Species: L. cederholmi

Binomial name
- Lankasoma cederholmi Mauriès, 1981

Species of millipede

Lankasoma cederholmi is a species of millipedes in the family Lankasomatidae. It is endemic to Sri Lanka.
