= Harpurostreptus matarae =

Scientific classification
- Kingdom: Animalia
- Phylum: Arthropoda
- Subphylum: Myriapoda
- Class: Diplopoda
- Order: Spirostreptida
- Family: Harpagophoridae
- Genus: Harpurostreptus
- Species: H. matarae

Binomial name
- Harpurostreptus matarae Carl, 1941

Species of millipede

Harpurostreptus matarae is a species of round-backed millipede in the family Harpagophoridae. It is endemic to Sri Lanka.
