= Spirobolus longicornis =

Scientific classification
- Kingdom: Animalia
- Phylum: Arthropoda
- Subphylum: Myriapoda
- Class: Diplopoda
- Order: Spirobolida
- Family: Spirobolidae
- Genus: Spirobolus
- Species: S. longicornis

Binomial name
- Spirobolus longicornis Pocock, 1892

Species of millipede

Spirobolus longicornis is a species of round-backed millipede in the family Spirobolidae. It is endemic to Sri Lanka.
