= Styloceylonius =

Scientific classification
- Kingdom: Animalia
- Phylum: Arthropoda
- Subphylum: Myriapoda
- Class: Diplopoda
- Order: Polydesmida
- Family: Pyrgodesmidae
- Genus: Styloceylonius; Verhoeff, 1936
- Species: S. lobatus

Binomial name
- Styloceylonius lobatus Verhoeff, 1936

Genus of millipedes

Styloceylonius lobatus is a species of millipede in the family Pyrgodesmidae. It is endemic to Sri Lanka. It is the only species in the genus Styloceylonius.
