= Lankasoma =

Scientific classification
- Kingdom: Animalia
- Phylum: Arthropoda
- Subphylum: Myriapoda
- Class: Diplopoda
- Order: Chordeumatida
- Family: Lankasomatidae
- Genus: Lankasoma; Mauriès, 1981

Type species
- Lankasoma mahleri Mauriès, 1981

Genus of millipedes

Lankasoma is a genus of millipedes of the family Lankasomatidae. It contains 5 described species, all are endemic to Sri Lanka.

== Species ==
- Lankasoma anderssoni
- Lankasoma brincki
- Lankasoma cederholmi
- Lankasoma mahleri
- Lankasoma oreites
