= Leptostreptus exiguus =

Scientific classification
- Kingdom: Animalia
- Phylum: Arthropoda
- Subphylum: Myriapoda
- Class: Diplopoda
- Order: Spirostreptida
- Family: Harpagophoridae
- Genus: Leptostreptus
- Species: L. exiguus

Binomial name
- Leptostreptus exiguus (Attems, 1950)

Synonyms
- Ktenostreptus exiguus Attems, 1950

Species of millipede

Leptostreptus exiguus is a species of round-backed millipede in the family Harpagophoridae. It is endemic to Sri Lanka.
