= Singhalorthomorpha cingalensis =

Scientific classification
- Kingdom: Animalia
- Phylum: Arthropoda
- Subphylum: Myriapoda
- Class: Diplopoda
- Order: Polydesmida
- Family: Paradoxosomatidae
- Genus: Singhalorthomorpha
- Species: S. cingalensis

Binomial name
- Singhalorthomorpha cingalensis Humbert, 1865

Species of millipede

Singhalorthomorpha cingalensis, is a species of millipedes in the family Paradoxosomatidae. It is endemic to Sri Lanka, first found from Pundaluoya Valley, Nuwara Eliya.
