= Glyphiulidae =

Scientific classification
- Kingdom: Animalia
- Phylum: Arthropoda
- Subphylum: Myriapoda
- Class: Diplopoda
- Order: Spirostreptida
- Family: Glyphiulidae; Chamberlin, 1922

Diversity
- c. 16 genera, 112 species

Family of millipedes

Glyphiulidae, is a family of round-backed millipedes of the order Spirostreptida. The family includes 112 species belonging to 16 genera.

== Genera ==
- Agastrophus
- Cambalomorpha
- Dolichoglyphius
- Formosoglyphius
- Glyphijulus
- Glyphiulus
- Hypocambala
- Ilyspasticus
- Javichus
- Nesocambala
- Octoglyphus
- Plusioglyphiulus
- Podoglyphiulus
- Trichocambala
- Trichonannolene
- Trogloglyphus
