= Singhalorthomorpha serrulata =

Scientific classification
- Kingdom: Animalia
- Phylum: Arthropoda
- Subphylum: Myriapoda
- Class: Diplopoda
- Order: Polydesmida
- Family: Paradoxosomatidae
- Genus: Singhalorthomorpha
- Species: S. serrulata

Binomial name
- Singhalorthomorpha serrulata (Attems, 1931)

Synonyms
- Orthomorpha serrulata Attems, 1931

Species of millipede

Singhalorthomorpha serrulata, is a species of millipedes in the family Paradoxosomatidae. It is endemic to Sri Lanka, first found from Nuwara Eliya.
