= Chondromorpha stadelmanni =

Scientific classification
- Kingdom: Animalia
- Phylum: Arthropoda
- Subphylum: Myriapoda
- Class: Diplopoda
- Order: Polydesmida
- Family: Paradoxosomatidae
- Genus: Chondromorpha
- Species: C. stadelmanni

Binomial name
- Chondromorpha stadelmanni (Verhoeff, 1930)

Synonyms
- Anoplodesmus stadelmanni Verhoeff, 1930

Species of myriapod

Chondromorpha stadelmanni is a species of millipede in the family Paradoxosomatidae. It is endemic to Sri Lanka.
