= Strongylosoma greeni =

Scientific classification
- Kingdom: Animalia
- Phylum: Arthropoda
- Subphylum: Myriapoda
- Class: Diplopoda
- Order: Polydesmida
- Family: Paradoxosomatidae
- Genus: Strongylosoma
- Species: S. greeni

Binomial name
- Strongylosoma greeni Pocock, 1892

Synonyms
- Orthomorpha greeni (Pocock, 1892)

Species of millipede

Strongylosoma greeni is a species of millipede in the family Paradoxosomatidae. It is endemic to Sri Lanka, first discovered from Pundaluoya, Nuwara Eliya.
