= Chondromorpha xanthotricha =

Scientific classification
- Kingdom: Animalia
- Phylum: Arthropoda
- Subphylum: Myriapoda
- Class: Diplopoda
- Order: Polydesmida
- Family: Paradoxosomatidae
- Genus: Chondromorpha
- Species: C. xanthotricha

Binomial name
- Chondromorpha xanthotricha (Attems, 1898)

Synonyms
- Anoplodesmus xanthotrichus (Attems, 1898); Chondromorpha granosa (Attems, 1913); Dasomus bicolor Chamberlin, 1941; Orthomorpha granosa Attems, 1913; Polydesmopeltis xanthotrichus (Attems, 1898); Prionopeltis clarus Chamberlin, 1920; Prionopeltis xanthotricha Attems, 1898; Prionopeltis xanthotrichus Attems, 1898; Xaymacia granulata Loomis, 1948

Species of millipede

Chondromorpha xanthotricha, is a species of millipedes in the family Paradoxosomatidae. It is native to South India and Sri Lanka. Two subspecies recognized.

== Distribution ==
Although native to India and Sri Lanka, with shipping transportation, they have been introduced to many countries such as Brazil, Cuba, Panama, Costa Rica, Mexico, Ecuador, Venezuela, Haiti, Taiwan, Philippines, Bali, New Caledonia, Samoa, Fiji, Mauritius, Guadeloupe, Jamaica, Suriname, Puerto Rico and many other Caribbean Islands. This species was recorded for the first time from Singapore in 2012.

== Description ==
It is about 20–26 mm in length. Adults are chestnut brown to dark grey in color. They can move very fast.

== Subspecies ==
- Chondromorpha xanthotricha hamuligerus Verhoeff, 1936
- Chondromorpha xanthotricha hirsutus Verhoeff, 1936
