= Anoplodesmus inornatus =

Scientific classification
- Kingdom: Animalia
- Phylum: Arthropoda
- Subphylum: Myriapoda
- Class: Diplopoda
- Order: Polydesmida
- Family: Paradoxosomatidae
- Genus: Anoplodesmus
- Species: A. inornatus

Binomial name
- Anoplodesmus inornatus (Humbert, 1865)

Species of millipede

Anoplodesmus inornatus, is a species of millipedes in the family Paradoxosomatidae. It is endemic to Sri Lanka, which was first documented from Peradeniya.
