= Humbertostreptus =

Scientific classification
- Kingdom: Animalia
- Phylum: Arthropoda
- Subphylum: Myriapoda
- Class: Diplopoda
- Order: Spirostreptida
- Family: Harpagophoridae
- Subfamily: Harpagophorinae
- Tribe: Ktenostreptini
- Genus: Humbertostreptus; Demange, 1969
- Species: H. lunelii

Binomial name
- Humbertostreptus lunelii (Attems, 1936)

Synonyms
- Spirostreptus lunelii Humbert, 1866; Thyropisthus lunelii (Humbert, 1866); Thyropygus luneli (Humbert, 1866)

Genus of millipedes

Humbertostreptus lunelii, is a species of round-backed millipede in the family Harpagophoridae. It is endemic to Sri Lanka. It is the only species in the genus Humbertostreptus.
