= Stenurostreptus =

Scientific classification
- Kingdom: Animalia
- Phylum: Arthropoda
- Subphylum: Myriapoda
- Class: Diplopoda
- Order: Spirostreptida
- Family: Harpagophoridae
- Subfamily: Harpagophorinae
- Tribe: Leiotelini
- Genus: Stenurostreptus; Carl, 1917
- Species: S. stenorhynchus

Binomial name
- Stenurostreptus stenorhynchus (Pocock, 1893)

Synonyms
- Spirostreptus stenorhynchus Pocock, 1893

Species of millipede

Stenurostreptus stenorhynchus is a species of round-backed millipede in the family Harpagophoridae. It is endemic to Sri Lanka. It is the only species in the genus Stenurostreptus.
