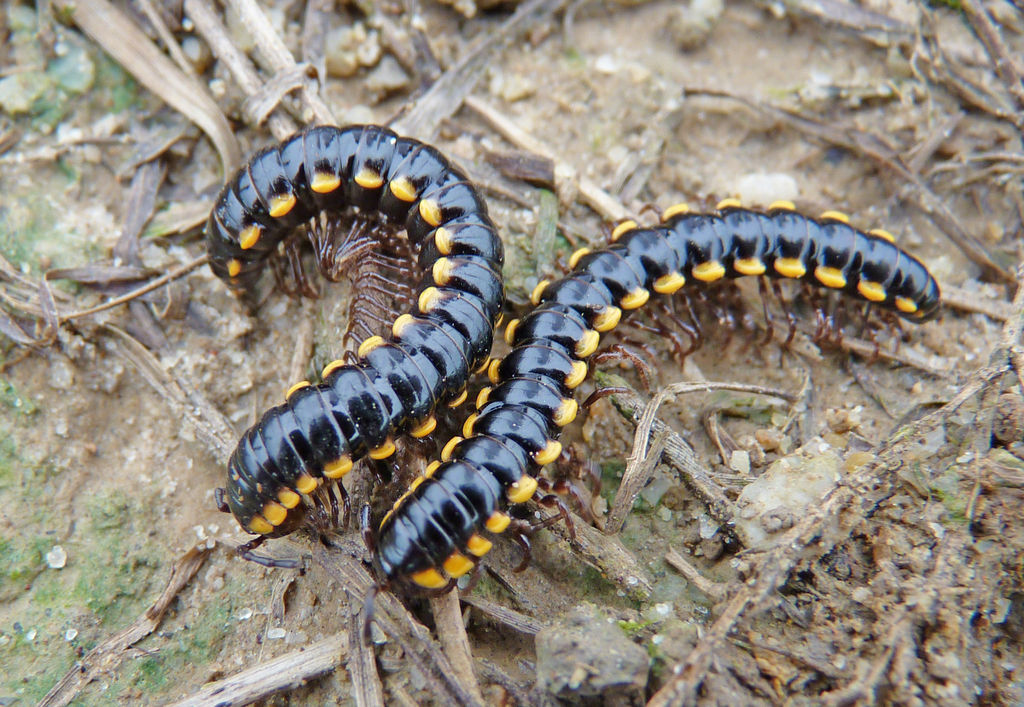

Scientific classification
- Kingdom: Animalia
- Phylum: Arthropoda
- Subphylum: Myriapoda
- Class: Diplopoda
- Order: Polydesmida
- Family: Paradoxosomatidae
- Genus: Anoplodesmus
- Species: A. anthracinus

Binomial name
- Anoplodesmus anthracinus Pocock, 1895

Synonyms
- Jonespeltis splendidus Attems, 1937

= Anoplodesmus anthracinus =

Species of millipede

Anoplodesmus anthracinus is a species of millipedes in the family Paradoxosomatidae. It was previously thought to confined to Myanmar, the species was reported and documented from Malaysia and Sri Lanka in 2013.

It is 33mm in length. Body color ranges from shiny blackish to dark brown with a yellowish paraterga.
