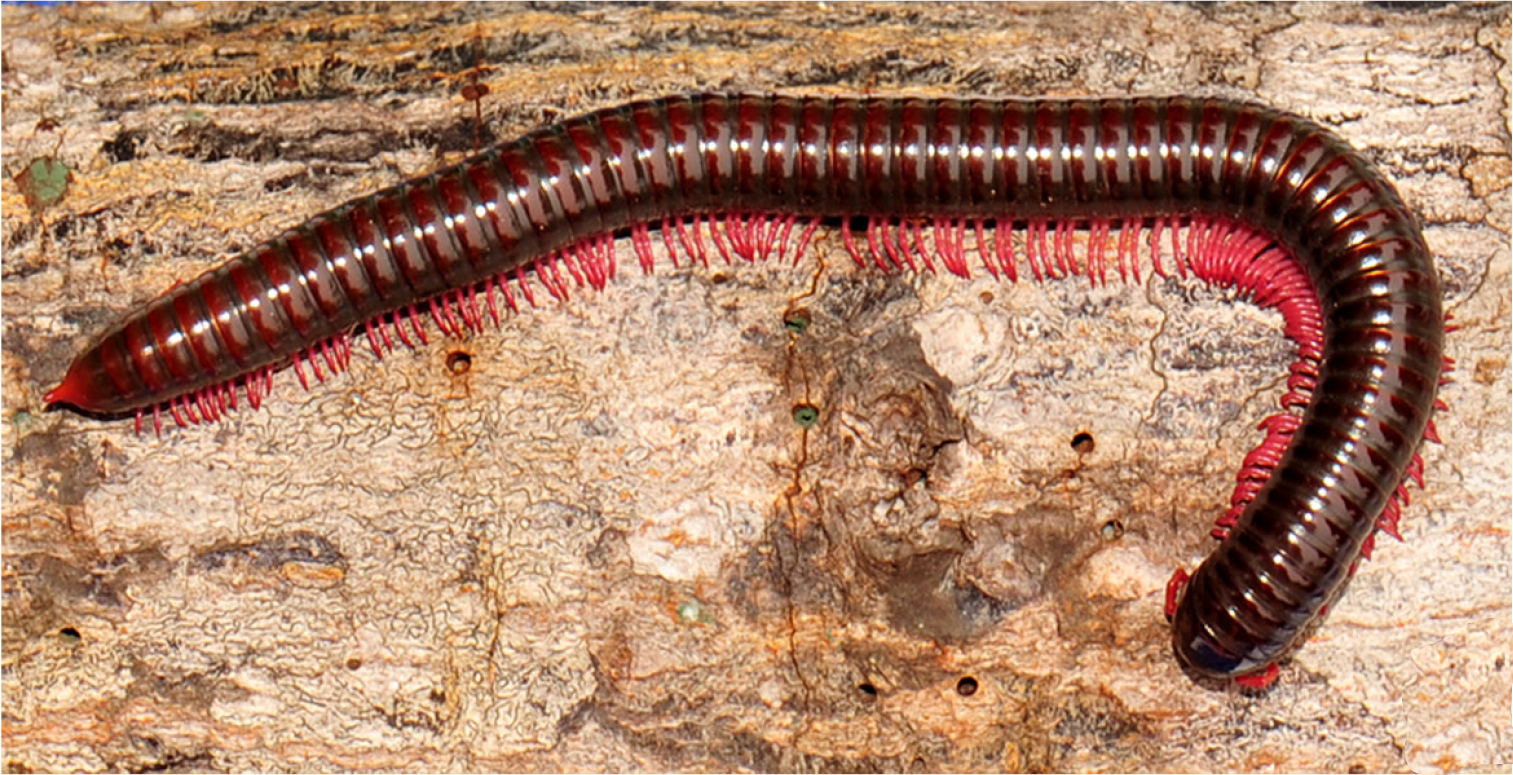
- Thyropygus navychula from the Surin Islands

Scientific classification
- Domain: Eukaryota
- Kingdom: Animalia
- Phylum: Arthropoda
- Subphylum: Myriapoda
- Class: Diplopoda
- Order: Spirostreptida
- Family: Harpagophoridae
- Subfamily: Harpagophorinae
- Tribe: Thyropygini
- Genus: Thyropygus; Pocock, 1894

Synonyms
- Cornugonus Demange, 1961; Duplopisthus Demange, 1961; Spoliatogonus Demange, 1961; Thyropisthus Attems, 1942; Trigonostreptus Demange, 1961

= Thyropygus =

Genus of millipedes

Thyropygus is a genus of millipedes in the family Harpagophoridae, widely distributed throughout Southeast Asia. It is the most-species rich genus of Harpagophoridae in Southeast Asia. Over 30 species occur in Thailand.

== Species ==
MilliBase lists the following accepted species:

1. Thyropygus acuminatus Silvestri, 1897
2. Thyropygus allevatus (Karsch, 1881)
3. Thyropygus amputus (Karsch, 1881)
4. Thyropygus anurus Pocock, 1896
5. Thyropygus aterrimus (Pocock, 1889)
6. Thyropygus bearti Pimvichai, Enghoff & Panha, 2009
7. Thyropygus bifurcus (Demange, 1986)
8. Thyropygus bispinispatula Pimvichai, Enghoff & Panha, 2009
9. Thyropygus bispinus Pimvichai, Enghoff & Panha, 2009
10. Thyropygus boyoricus (Attems, 1903)
11. Thyropygus brachyacanthus Pimvichai, Enghoff & Panha, 2009
12. Thyropygus carli (Attems, 1938)
13. Thyropygus casjeekeli Pimvichai, Enghoff & Panha, 2009
14. Thyropygus chelatus Pimvichai, Enghoff & Panha, 2009
15. Thyropygus cimi Pimvichai, Enghoff, Panha & Backeljau, 2016
16. Thyropygus coelestis Silvestri, 1895
17. Thyropygus confusus Attems, 1938
18. Thyropygus convolutus (Demange, 1961)
19. Thyropygus cristagalli Pimvichai, Enghoff & Panha, 2009
20. Thyropygus cuisinieri Carl, 1917
21. Thyropygus culter Pimvichai, Enghoff, Panha & Backeljau, 2016
22. Thyropygus demangei Pimvichai, Enghoff & Panha, 2009
23. Thyropygus dormiens Pimvichai, Enghoff & Panha, 2011
24. Thyropygus dubius (Demange, 1961)
25. Thyropygus elegans Silvestri, 1895
26. Thyropygus enghoffi (Demange, 1989)
27. Thyropygus erectus Pimvichai, Enghoff & Panha, 2009
28. Thyropygus erythropleurus Pocock, 1894 - type species
29. Thyropygus evansi (Demange, 1961)
30. Thyropygus floweri (Demange, 1961)
31. Thyropygus foliaceus (Demange, 1961)
32. Thyropygus forceps Pimvichai, Enghoff, Panha & Backeljau, 2016
33. Thyropygus globulus (Demange, 1989)
34. Thyropygus hoffmani Demange, 1961
35. Thyropygus immanis (Attems, 1903)
36. Thyropygus implicatus (Demange, 1961)
37. Thyropygus induratus Attems, 1936
38. Thyropygus inflexus (Demange, 1989)
39. Thyropygus intermedius Demange, 1983
40. Thyropygus jarukchusri Pimvichai, Enghoff & Panha, 2011
41. Thyropygus laterolobatus Pimvichai, Enghoff & Panha, 2011
42. Thyropygus loxia Pimvichai, Enghoff & Panha, 2009
43. Thyropygus luxuriosus Silvestri, 1895
44. Thyropygus macrosiamensis Pimvichai, Enghoff & Panha, 2011
45. Thyropygus mesocristatus Pimvichai, Enghoff, Panha & Backeljau, 2016
46. Thyropygus microporus Attems, 1935
47. Thyropygus navychula Pimvichai, Enghoff, Panha & Backeljau, 2016
48. Thyropygus opinatus (Karsch, 1881)
49. Thyropygus pachyurus Pocock, 1894
50. Thyropygus peninsularis Hoffman, 1982
51. Thyropygus perakensis (Pocock, 1892)
52. Thyropygus planispina Pimvichai, Enghoff, Panha & Backeljau, 2016
53. Thyropygus quadricuspis Pimvichai, Enghoff & Panha, 2009
54. Thyropygus quietus Attems, 1938
55. Thyropygus renschi Attems, 1930
56. Thyropygus resimus Attems, 1938
57. Thyropygus richardhoffmani Pimvichai, Enghoff & Panha, 2009
58. Thyropygus rubrocinctus Pocock, 1894
59. Thyropygus siamensis Verhoeff, 1938
60. Thyropygus sutchariti Pimvichai, Enghoff, Panha & Backeljau, 2016
61. Thyropygus uncinatus (Demange, 1961)
62. Thyropygus undulatus Pimvichai, Enghoff, Panha & Backeljau, 2016
63. Thyropygus ursus Pimvichai, Enghoff, Panha & Backeljau, 2016
64. Thyropygus weberi Pocock, 1894
65. Thyropygus weidneri Hoffman, 1982
