= Paranedyopus simplex =

Scientific classification
- Kingdom: Animalia
- Phylum: Arthropoda
- Subphylum: Myriapoda
- Class: Diplopoda
- Order: Polydesmida
- Family: Paradoxosomatidae
- Genus: Paranedyopus
- Species: P. simplex

Binomial name
- Paranedyopus simplex (Humbert, 1865)

Synonyms
- Anoplodesmus simplex (Humbert, 1865); Orthomorpha simplex (Humbert, 1865); Polydesmus simplex Humbert, 1865; Strongylosoma simplex (Humbert, 1865); Sundanina simplex (Humbert, 1865)

Species of millipede

Paranedyopus simplex, is a species of millipedes in the family Paradoxosomatidae. It is endemic to Sri Lanka, first documented from Pundaloya. The species is greatly differ from other members of the genus due to reduced paraterga and more elaborate gonopods.
