= Silvestrus ceylonicus =

Scientific classification
- Kingdom: Animalia
- Phylum: Arthropoda
- Subphylum: Myriapoda
- Class: Diplopoda
- Order: Polyxenida
- Family: Polyxenidae
- Genus: Silvestrus
- Species: S. ceylonicus

Binomial name
- Silvestrus ceylonicus (Pocock, 1892)

Synonyms
- Polyxenus ceylonicus Pocock, 1892

Species of millipede

Silvestrus ceylonicus is a species of millipede in the family Polyxenidae. It is endemic to Sri Lanka.
