= Anoplodesmus humberti =

Scientific classification
- Kingdom: Animalia
- Phylum: Arthropoda
- Subphylum: Myriapoda
- Class: Diplopoda
- Order: Polydesmida
- Family: Paradoxosomatidae
- Genus: Anoplodesmus
- Species: A. humberti

Binomial name
- Anoplodesmus humberti (Carl, 1902)

Species of millipede

Anoplodesmus humberti is a species of millipede in the family Paradoxosomatidae. It is endemic to Sri Lanka, which was first documented from Peradeniya.
