= Anoplodesmus thwaitesii =

Scientific classification
- Kingdom: Animalia
- Phylum: Arthropoda
- Subphylum: Myriapoda
- Class: Diplopoda
- Order: Polydesmida
- Family: Paradoxosomatidae
- Genus: Anoplodesmus
- Species: A. thwaitesii

Binomial name
- Anoplodesmus thwaitesii (Humbert, 1865)

Synonyms
- Leptodesmus thwaitesii (Humbert, 1865); Polydesmus thwaitesii Humbert, 1865

Species of millipede

Anoplodesmus thwaitesii is a species of millipede in the family Paradoxosomatidae. It was once thought endemic to Sri Lanka, where first documented from Peradeniya.
