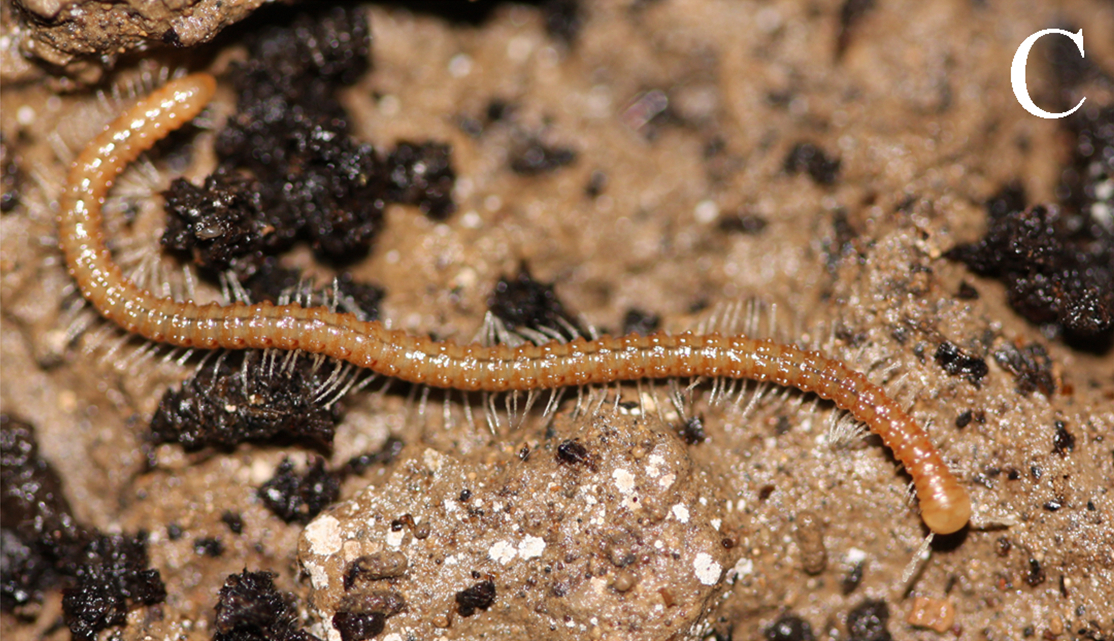
- Glyphiulus sp.

Scientific classification
- Kingdom: Animalia
- Phylum: Arthropoda
- Subphylum: Myriapoda
- Class: Diplopoda
- Order: Spirostreptida
- Family: Cambalopsidae
- Subfamily: Glyphiulinae
- Genus: Glyphiulus; Gervais, 1847

Type species
- Glyphiulus granulatus Gervais, 1847

Synonyms
- Glyphijulus Karsch, 1881; Cambalomorpha Pocock, 1895; Keratoglyphiulus Attems, 1909; Formosoglyphius Verhoeff, 1936; Koinoglyphius Carl, 1941; Octoglyphus Loksa, 1960; Trogloglyphus Loksa, 1960

= Glyphiulus =

Genus of millipedes

Glyphiulus is a genus of millipedes belonging to the order Spirostreptida, family Cambalopsidae. It is the largest Southeast Asian millipede genus comprise about 47 to 57 species ranging from southern China, northern Laos, and northern Thailand in the north to southern Vietnam in the south. The type species shows a pantropical distribution. The number of species always changes due to continuous discoveries of new species.

== Species ==
- Glyphiulus adeloglyphus
- Glyphiulus anophthalmus
- Glyphiulus balazsi
- Glyphiulus basalis
- Glyphiulus bedosae
- Glyphiulus beroni
- Glyphiulus calceus
- Glyphiulus capucinus
- Glyphiulus costulifer
- Glyphiulus deharvengi
- Glyphiulus foetidus
- Glyphiulus formosus
- Glyphiulus granulatus
- Glyphiulus guangnanensis
- Glyphiulus impletus
- Glyphiulus intermedius
- Glyphiulus javanicus
- Glyphiulus latellai
- Glyphiulus latus
- Glyphiulus liangshanensis
- Glyphiulus lipsorum
- Glyphiulus mediator
- Glyphiulus mediobliteratus
- Glyphiulus melanoporus
- Glyphiulus obliteratoides
- Glyphiulus obliteratus
- Glyphiulus paracostulifer
- Glyphiulus paragranulatus
- Glyphiulus parobliteratus
- Glyphiulus percostulifer
- Glyphiulus pergranulatus
- Glyphiulus pulcher
- Glyphiulus quadrohamatus
- Glyphiulus rayrouchi
- Glyphiulus recticullus
- Glyphiulus semicostulifer
- Glyphiulus semigranulatus
- Glyphiulus septentrionalis
- Glyphiulus siamensis
- Glyphiulus sinensis
- Glyphiulus subbedosae
- Glyphiulus subcostulifer
- Glyphiulus subgranulatus
- Glyphiulus subobliteratus
- Glyphiulus superbus
- Glyphiulus vietnamicus
- Glyphiulus zorzini
