= Pterozonium picteti =

Scientific classification
- Kingdom: Animalia
- Phylum: Arthropoda
- Subphylum: Myriapoda
- Class: Diplopoda
- Order: Siphonophorida
- Family: Siphonophoridae
- Genus: Pterozonium
- Species: P. picteti

Binomial name
- Pterozonium picteti (Humbert, 1865)

Synonyms
- Siphonophora picteti Humbert, 1865

Species of millipede

Pterozonium picteti is a species of millipede in the family Siphonophoridae. It is endemic to Sri Lanka.
