= Cingalosoma =

Scientific classification
- Kingdom: Animalia
- Phylum: Arthropoda
- Subphylum: Myriapoda
- Class: Diplopoda
- Order: Chordeumatida
- Family: Lankasomatidae
- Genus: Cingalosoma; Mauriès, 1982
- Species: C. anderssoni

Binomial name
- Cingalosoma anderssoni (Mauriès, 1982)

Genus of millipedes

Cingalosoma anderssoni is a species of millipede in the family Lankasomatidae. It is endemic to Sri Lanka. It is the only species in the genus Cingalosoma.
