= Pocodesmus =

Scientific classification
- Kingdom: Animalia
- Phylum: Arthropoda
- Subphylum: Myriapoda
- Class: Diplopoda
- Order: Polydesmida
- Family: Cryptodesmidae
- Subfamily: Otodesminae
- Tribe: Pocodesmini
- Genus: Pocodesmus; Cook, 1896
- Species: P. greeni

Binomial name
- Pocodesmus greeni (Pocock, 1892)

Genus of millipedes

Pocodesmus greeni is a species of millipedes in the family Cryptodesmidae. It is endemic to Sri Lanka. It is the only species in the genus Pocodesmus.
