= Lankabolus =

Lankabolus coelebs

Scientific classification
- Kingdom: Animalia
- Phylum: Arthropoda
- Subphylum: Myriapoda
- Class: Diplopoda
- Order: Spirobolida
- Family: Trigoniulidae
- Genus: Lankabolus
- Species: L. coelebs

Binomial name
- Lankabolus coelebs Carl, 1941

Species of millipede

Lankabolus coelebs, is a species of round-backed millipede in the family Trigoniulidae of monotypic genus Lankabolus. It is endemic to Sri Lanka.
