= Cryptodesmidae =

Scientific classification
- Kingdom: Animalia
- Phylum: Arthropoda
- Subphylum: Myriapoda
- Class: Diplopoda
- Order: Polydesmida
- Suborder: Polydesmidea
- Infraorder: Polydesmoides
- Superfamily: Polydesmoidea
- Family: Cryptodesmidae; Karsch, 1880

Diversity
- c. 7 genera, 18 species

Family of millipedes

Cryptodesmidae is a millipede family of the order Polydesmida. The family includes 18 species belonging to seven genera.

== Genera ==
- Diaphanacme
- Maderesmus
- Pocodesmus
- Peridontodesmus
- Pinesmus
- Sierresmus
- Singhalocryptus
