= Pseudospirobolellidae =

Scientific classification
- Kingdom: Animalia
- Phylum: Arthropoda
- Subphylum: Myriapoda
- Class: Diplopoda
- Order: Spirobolida
- Suborder: Spirobolidea
- Family: Pseudospirobolellidae; Brölemann, 1913

Diversity
- c. 7 genera, 12 species

Family of millipedes

Pseudospirobolellidae is a family of round-backed millipedes of the order Spirobolida. The family includes 12 species belonging to seven genera.

== Genera ==
- Azygobolus
- Benoitolus
- Guamobolus
- Javolus
- Pseudospirobolellus
- Saipanellas
- Solaenobolellus
