= Spirobolus =

Scientific classification
- Kingdom: Animalia
- Phylum: Arthropoda
- Subphylum: Myriapoda
- Class: Diplopoda
- Order: Spirobolida
- Family: Spirobolidae
- Subfamily: Spirobolinae
- Tribe: Spirobolini
- Genus: Spirobolus; Brandt, 1833

Synonyms
- Prospirobolus Attems, 1910; Sinobolus Chamberlin & Wang, 1953

Genus of millipedes

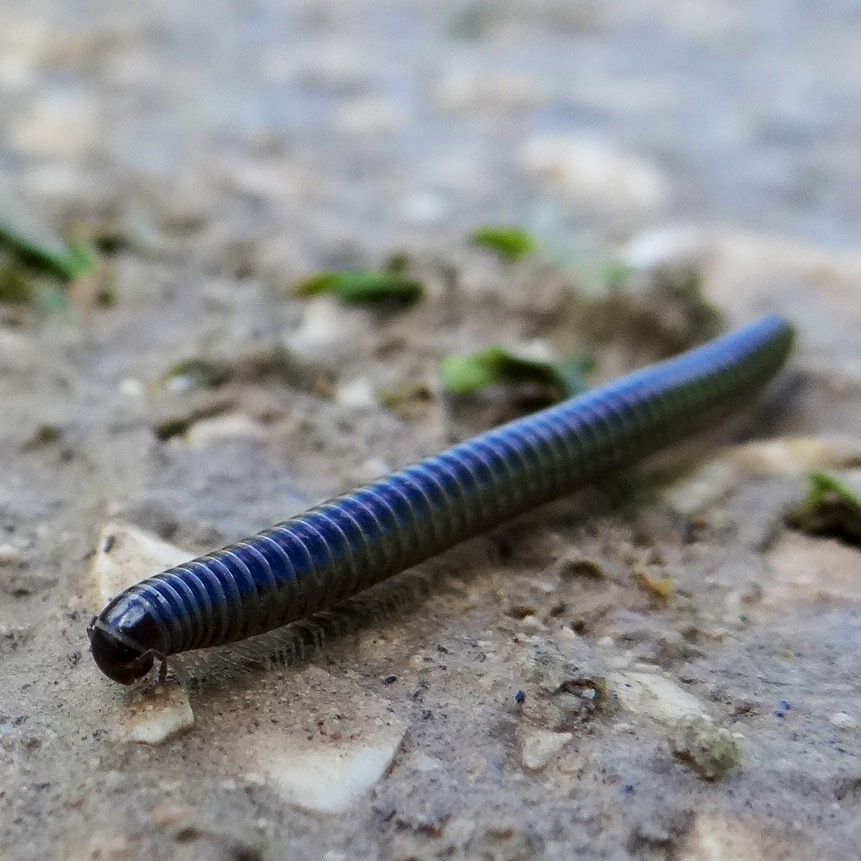
Spirobolus marginatus

Spirobolus is a genus of millipedes in the family Spirobolidae.

== Species ==
Species accepted as of May 2025:

- Spirobolus adstrictus Porat, 1888
- Spirobolus akamma Kato, Takano, Nakano & Shimano, 2023
- Spirobolus andersoni Pocock, 1889
- Spirobolus angusticollis Porat, 1894
- Spirobolus arcuosus Porat, 1892
- Spirobolus argintineus Porat, 1888
- Spirobolus biconicus Karsch, 1881
- Spirobolus brandti Karsch, 1881
- Spirobolus bungii Brandt, 1833
- Spirobolus cincinnalis Wang & Zhang, 1993
- Spirobolus comorensis Karsch, 1881
- Spirobolus costulatus Porat, 1876
- Spirobolus crassus Porat, 1892
- Spirobolus crebristriatus Humbert, 1865
- Spirobolus cupulifer Voges, 1878
- Spirobolus dealbatus C. L. Koch, 1847
- Spirobolus dissentaneus Karsch, 1881
- Spirobolus dorsalis (Le Guillou, 1841)
- Spirobolus falkensteinii Karsch, 1879
- Spirobolus festivus C. L. Koch, 1847
- Spirobolus fomosus Porat, 1872
- Spirobolus formosae Keeton, 1960
- Spirobolus gianteus Porat, 1872
- Spirobolus globulanus Karsch, 1881
- Spirobolus gracilis Bollman, 1893
- Spirobolus grahami Keeton, 1960
- Spirobolus grandidieri De Saussure, 1902
- Spirobolus hamatus Voges, 1878
- Spirobolus hecate Butler, 1876
- Spirobolus holosericus Voges, 1878
- Spirobolus impressus Porat, 1876
- Spirobolus insculptus Porat, 1888
- Spirobolus laeticollis Porat, 1894
- Spirobolus laevigatus Porat, 1876
- Spirobolus laeviventris Porat, 1892
- Spirobolus longicornis Pocock, 1892
- Spirobolus multiforus Karsch, 1881
- Spirobolus mundulus Karsch, 1881
- Spirobolus nigerrimus Newport, 1844
- Spirobolus nigricans (Mikan, 1834)
- Spirobolus obscurus C. L. Koch, 1847
- Spirobolus obtusatus (Mikan, 1834)
- Spirobolus olfersii Brandt, 1833
- Spirobolus praelongus C. L. Koch, 1847
- Spirobolus praslinus De Saussure & Zehntner, 1902
- Spirobolus pulvillatus Newport, 1844
- Spirobolus punctidorsis Porat, 1894
- Spirobolus pyrocephalus L. Koch, 1865
- Spirobolus segmentatus Karsch, 1881
- Spirobolus simillimus Newport, 1844
- Spirobolus simulans Carl, 1905
- Spirobolus spirostreptinus Karsch, 1881
- Spirobolus sulcatus Voges, 1878
- Spirobolus taprobanensis Humbert, 1865
- Spirobolus tegulatus Voges, 1878
- Spirobolus tessellatus Porat, 1872
- Spirobolus umbobrochus Keeton, 1960
- Spirobolus univittatus Porat, 1876
- Spirobolus virescens Daday, 1891
- Spirobolus walkeri Pocock, 1895
- Spirobolus zonipus Bollman, 1893
