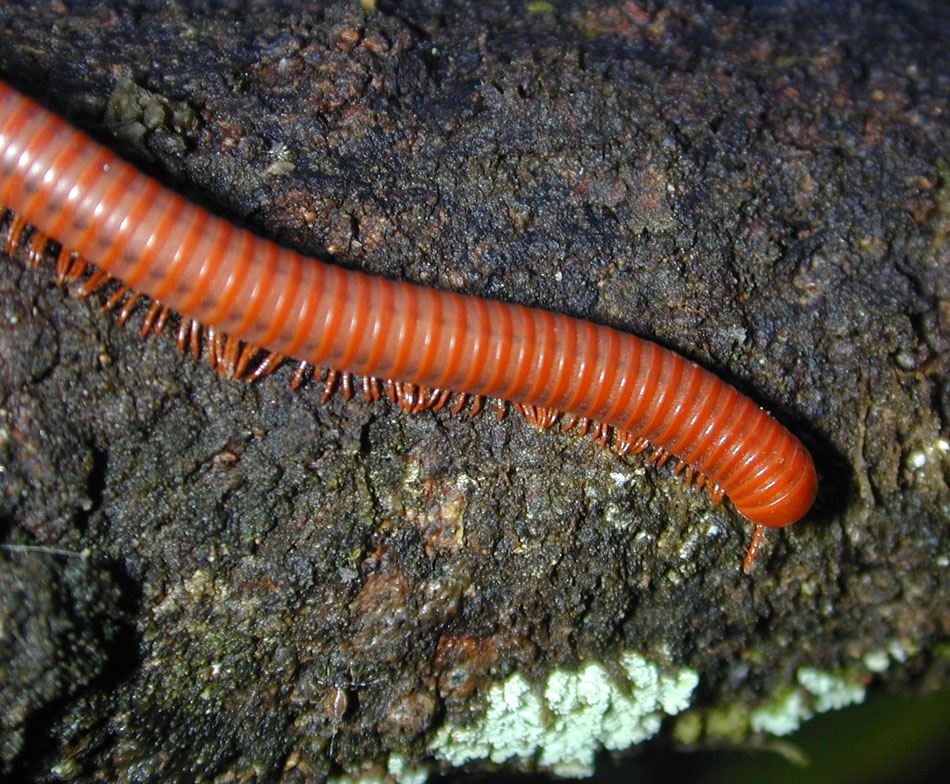
- Trigoniulus corallinus

Scientific classification
- Kingdom: Animalia
- Phylum: Arthropoda
- Subphylum: Myriapoda
- Class: Diplopoda
- Order: Spirobolida
- Family: Trigoniulidae; Cook, 1897

Diversity
- c. 25 genera, 171 species

= Trigoniulidae =

Family of millipedes

Trigoniulidae, is a family of round-backed millipedes of the order Spirobolida. The family includes 171 species in 25 genera.

== Genera ==
- Acanthiulus
- Ainigmabolus
- Apeuthes
- Cairibolus
- Chersastus
- Cingalobolus
- Decelus
- Epombrophilus
- Eucarlia
- Lankabolus
- Leptogoniulus
- Litobolus
- Marshallbolus
- Phagostrophus
- Plokamostrophus
- Prionopeza
- Speleostrophus
- Spirostrophus
- Sympastrophus
- Thrinciulus
- Trigoniulus
- Trucobolus
- Variulus
- Zygostrophus
