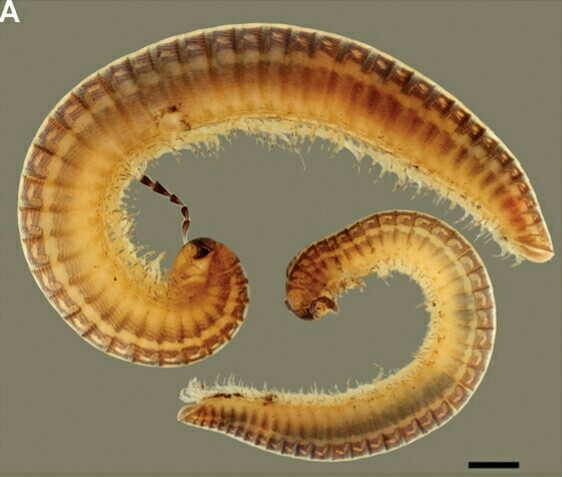
- Stemmiulus beroni, a West African species

Scientific classification
- Domain: Eukaryota
- Kingdom: Animalia
- Phylum: Arthropoda
- Subphylum: Myriapoda
- Class: Diplopoda
- Subclass: Chilognatha
- Infraclass: Helminthomorpha
- Subterclass: Eugnatha
- Superorder: Nematophora
- Order: Stemmiulida; Cook, 1895
- Family: Stemmiulidae; Pocock, 1894

= Stemmiulidae =

Order of millipedes

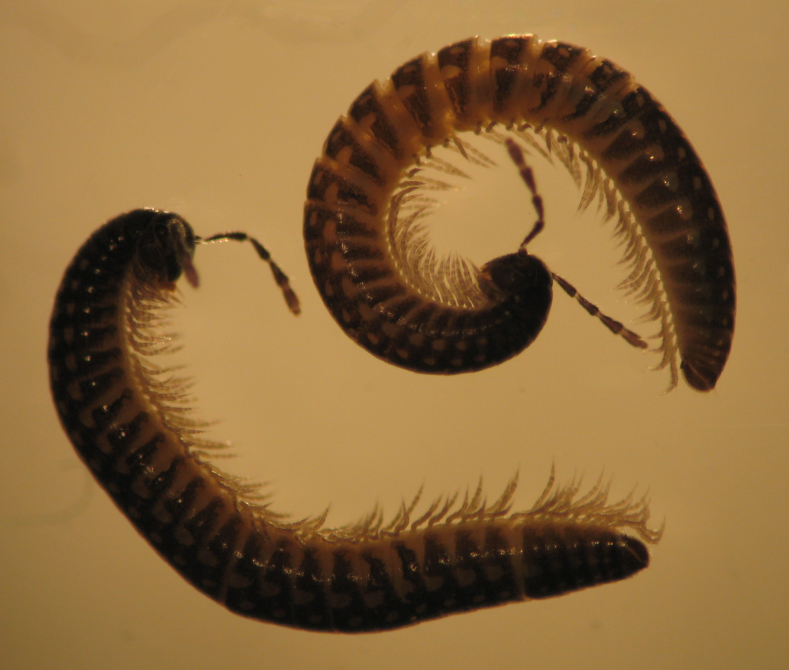
Unidentified stemmiulids from Puerto Rico

Stemmiulida is an order of millipedes consisting of approximately 130 species, reaching up to 50 mm in length. It contains a single family, Stemmiulidae.

== Description ==
Stemmiulids are small to medium sized millipedes, reaching a maximum length of 50 mm (2 in). The body tapers gradually, and is laterally compressed, so is taller than wide. A dorsal groove is present and runs from head to tail. The eyes consist of two large ocelli on each side of the head, and some members are capable of jumping. The living species lack Tömösváry organs, although a fossil species from the Miocene epoch possesses them.

== Classification ==
Stemmiluda contains 6-10 living genera and at least one fossil genus, all in the family Stemmiulidae. Species estimates range from about 120 to 150 species. The taxonomy is controversial, with some authors lumping species into as few as three genera. The most liberal classification is presented below.

- Diopsiulus
- Eostemmiulus
- Nethoiulus
- Paurochaeturus
- †Parastemmiulus (Early-Middle Miocene; Mexican amber)
- Plusiochaeturus
- Prostemmiulus
- Scoliogmus
- Stemmatoiulus
- Stemmijulus
- Stemmiulus
