= Cambalopsidae =

Scientific classification
- Domain: Eukaryota
- Kingdom: Animalia
- Phylum: Arthropoda
- Subphylum: Myriapoda
- Class: Diplopoda
- Order: Spirostreptida
- Suborder: Cambalidea
- Superfamily: Cambaloidea
- Family: Cambalopsidae; Cook, 1895

Diversity
- c. 16 genera, species

Synonyms
- Trachyiulidae Silvestri, 1896; Glyphiulinae Chamberlin, 1922; Agastrophinae Verhoeff, 1924; Dolichoglyphiulinae Verhoeff, 1938

Family of millipedes

Cambalopsidae, is a family of round-backed millipedes of the order Spirostreptida. The family includes species belongs to 16 genera.

== Genera ==
- Agastrophus
- Cambalopsis
- Chonecambala
- Dolichoglyphius
- Glyphiulus
- Hypocambala
- Ilyspasticus
- Javichus
- Nesocambala
- Paratrachiulus
- Phanolene
- Plusioglyphiulus
- Podoglyphiulus
- Trachyjulus
- Trichocambala
- Trichonannolene
