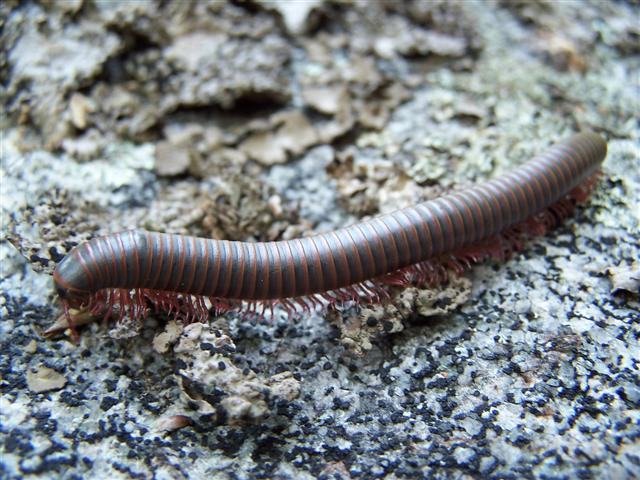
- Narceus americanus

Scientific classification
- Kingdom: Animalia
- Phylum: Arthropoda
- Subphylum: Myriapoda
- Class: Diplopoda
- Order: Spirobolida
- Suborder: Spirobolidea
- Family: Spirobolidae; Bollman, 1893

Subfamilies
- Spirobolinae Bollman, 1893; Tylobolinae Keeton, 1960

= Spirobolidae =

Family of millipedes

Spirobolidae is a family of millipedes in the order Spirobolida. The family consists of several genera with numerous species, and is commonly divided into the subfamilies Spirobolinae and Tylobolinae.

== Classification ==
Subfamily Spirobolinae

- Auxobolus Chamberlin, 1949
- Aztecolus Chamberlin, 1943
- Chicobolus Chamberlin, 1947
- Narceus Rafinesque, 1820
- Spirobolus Brandt, 1833

Subfamily Tylobolinae

- Hiltonius Chamberlin, 1918
- Tylobolus Cook, 1904
