= Lankasomatidae =

Scientific classification
- Domain: Eukaryota
- Kingdom: Animalia
- Phylum: Arthropoda
- Subphylum: Myriapoda
- Class: Diplopoda
- Order: Chordeumatida
- Suborder: Heterochordeumatidea
- Superfamily: Pygmaeosomatoidea
- Family: Lankasomatidae; Mauriès, 1978

Diversity
- c. 3 genera, 11 species

Family of millipedes

Lankasomatidae, is a millipede family in the suborder Heterochordeumatidea of order Chordeumatida.

== Genera ==
This family includes the following genera:

- Cingalosoma Mauriès, 1982
- Lankasoma Mauriès, 1981
