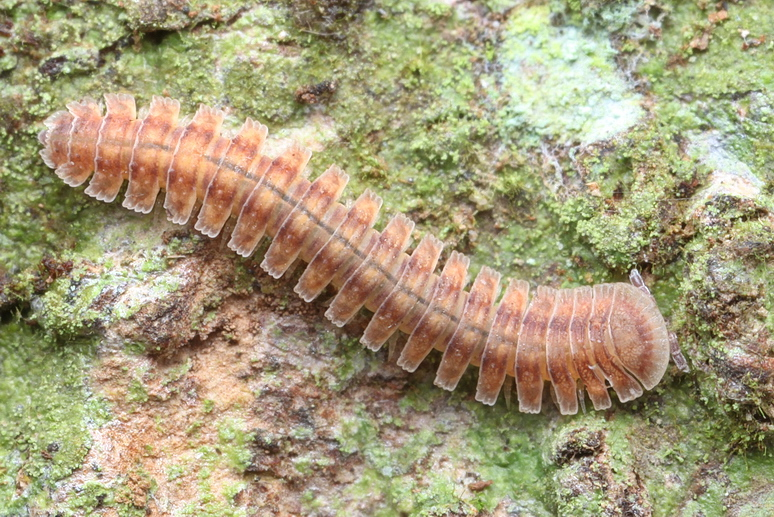
- A pyrgodesmid in Singapore

Scientific classification
- Kingdom: Animalia
- Phylum: Arthropoda
- Subphylum: Myriapoda
- Class: Diplopoda
- Order: Polydesmida
- Suborder: Polydesmidea
- Infraorder: Oniscodesmoides
- Superfamily: Pyrgodesmoidea
- Family: Pyrgodesmidae; Silvestri, 1896

= Pyrgodesmidae =

Family of millipedes

Pyrgodesmidae is a family of flat-backed millipedes in the order Polydesmida. This family is one of the largest families of millipedes, with more than 170 genera, including about 120 monotypic genera. These genera include almost 400 species.

== Distribution ==
The species in this family are found in tropics around the world, including tropical Africa. These millipedes are also found in southern Europe, North Africa, central China, Taiwan, and Japan. Their geographic distribution extends from Texas to Brazil and also includes the West Indies, India, the East Indies, New Caledonia, Hawaii, and many other Pacific islands.

== Description ==
Millipedes in this family are small, ranging from 3 mm to 16 mm in length, but mostly between 6 mm and 10 mm. These millipedes are usually uniformly grayish or brownish. The collum mostly or completely covers the head from above and is usually shaped like a fan, with a dorsal surface ornamented with distinct radiating lines or small lobes at the front. The tergites nearly always slope downward and feature conspicuous lobes or tubercles that are usually arranged in rows. The ozopores often open on short columns and usually deviate from the distribution among segments normally observed in the order Polydesmida. The paranota often feature small lobes on the anterior or posterior margins. Millipedes in this family are not capable of volvation.

== Notable genera ==
Some species in this family are found only in ant colonies, and are considered obligate myrmecophiles. Millipedes in this family that inhabit ant nests include two Mexican species of the genus Myrmecodesmus. Another nine species found among army ants in Panama and Mexico include species in the genera Calymmodesmus, Cynedesmus, and Rettenmeyeria.

The Neotropical genus Poratia includes species that readily adopt parthenogenic reproduction. Two of these species have been introduced into European hothouses as parthenogenic populations. This genus is also notable for including four species with only 19 segments as adults (counting the collum, the telson, and the rings in between), one fewer than normally found in the order Polydesmida.
