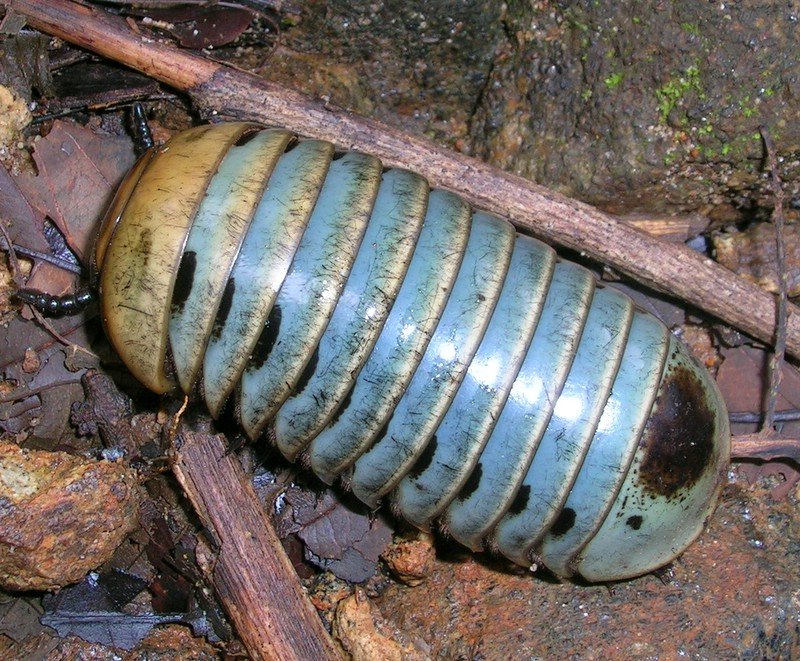
- An Arthrosphaera fumosa from India.

Scientific classification
- Domain: Eukaryota
- Kingdom: Animalia
- Phylum: Arthropoda
- Subphylum: Myriapoda
- Class: Diplopoda
- Order: Sphaerotheriida
- Family: Arthrosphaeridae
- Genus: Arthrosphaera; Pocock, 1895

= Arthrosphaera =

Genus of pill millipedes

Arthrosphaera is a genus of pill millipedes in the family Arthrosphaeridae, found in Africa, Madagascar, the Western Ghats of India, and Sri Lanka.
