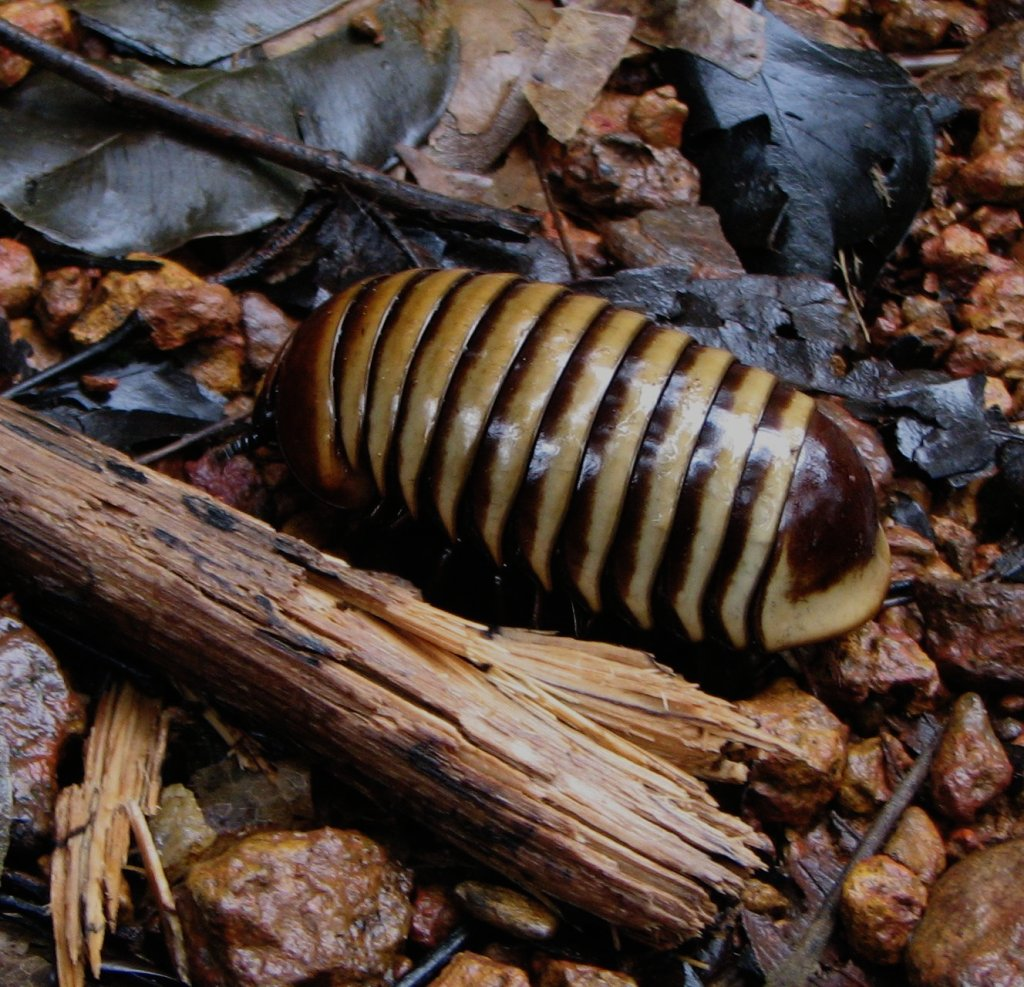

Scientific classification
- Kingdom: Animalia
- Phylum: Arthropoda
- Subphylum: Myriapoda
- Class: Diplopoda
- Order: Sphaerotheriida
- Family: Arthrosphaeridae; Jeekel, 1974

= Arthrosphaeridae =

Family of millipedes

Arthrosphaeridae is a family of giant pill millipedes that are found in Madagascar, the Western Ghats of India, and Sri Lanka. The largest pill-millipede in the world, Zoosphaerium neptunus (Butler 1872) belongs to this family and is known to swarm at certain times of the year.

== Description ==
The first segment of the anterior telopods have a stridulatory organ known as a "harp" and this has one to ten ribs. The anal plate on the female is enlarged and has 1-12 ribs while the male anal shield has no special sclerotized notch as seen in other families. The segments of the antenna are oval or cylindrical.

== Taxonomy ==
Within the family Arthrosphaeridae there are four genus formally described:

- Arthrosphaera Pocock, 1895 – India, Sri Lanka
- Microsphaerotherium Wesener & van den Spiegel, 2007 – Madagascar
- Sphaeromimus de Saussure & Zehntner, 1902 – Southeast Madagascar
- Zoosphaerium Pocock, 1895 – Madagascar
