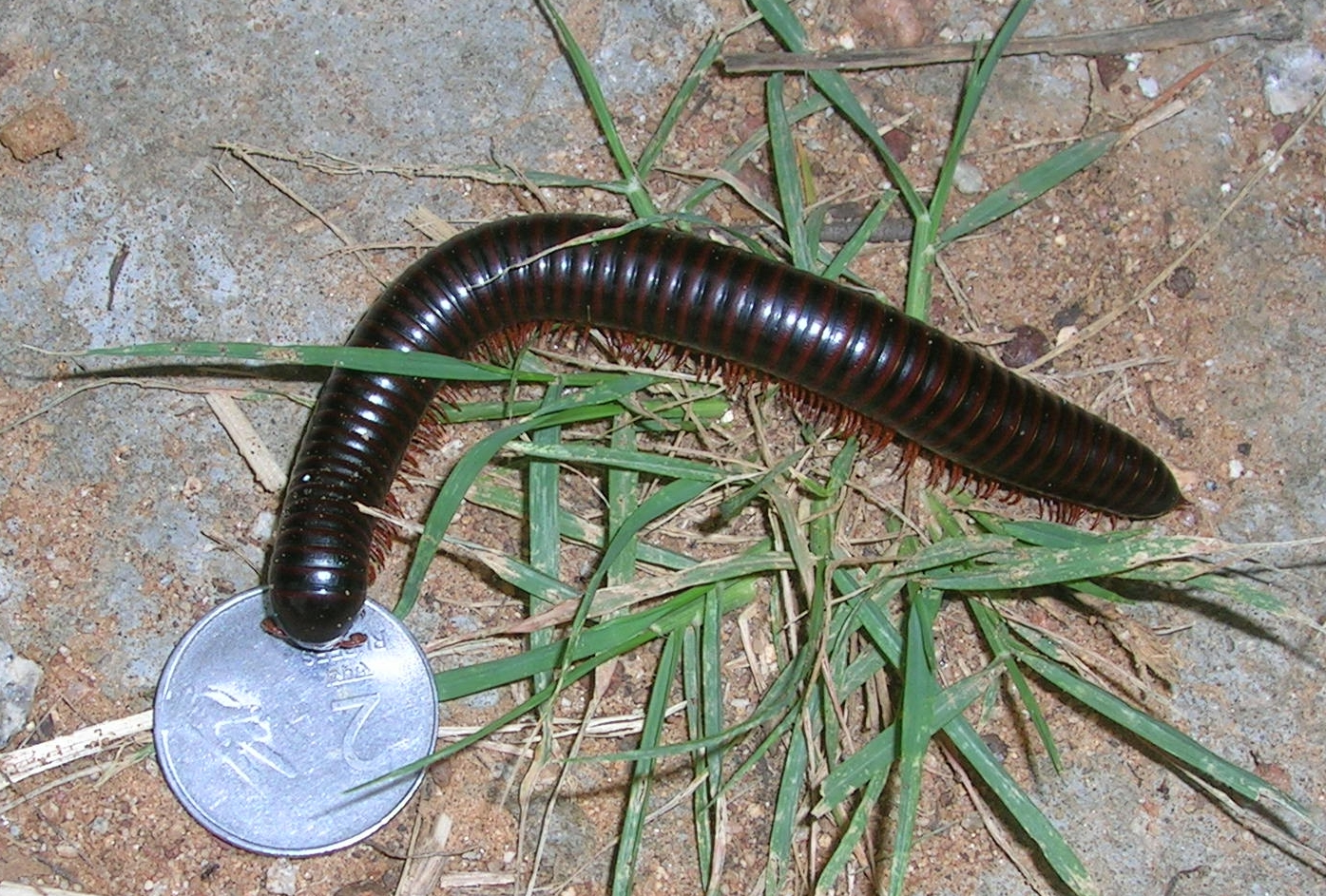
- Phyllogonostreptus spp.

Scientific classification
- Domain: Eukaryota
- Kingdom: Animalia
- Phylum: Arthropoda
- Subphylum: Myriapoda
- Class: Diplopoda
- Order: Spirostreptida
- Family: Harpagophoridae; Attems, 1909

Subfamilies
- Adiaphorostreptinae; Harpagophorinae; Rhynchoproctinae

= Harpagophoridae =

Family of millipedes

Harpagophoridae is a family of round-backed millipedes of the order Spirostreptida. The family includes 269 species belonging to 55 genera, distributed in Africa, Southeast Asia, and the East Indies, as well as a few Indian Oceanic islands. Two subfamilies are recognized.

== Genera ==
There are about 55 genera (and 269 species):

- Agaricogonopus
- Alienostreptus
- Anurostreptus
- Apoctenophora
- Armatostreptus
- Balustreptus
- Cambodjostreptus
- Carlogonus
- Cercostreptus
- Cornugonus
- Ctenorangoon
- Cystogonopus
- Dametus
- Drepanopus
- Duplopisthus
- Eremobelus
- Fageostreptus
- Falcigonopus
- Gnomognathus
- Gongylorrhus
- Gonoplectus
- Harpagophora
- Harpagophorella
- Harpurostreptus
- Heptischius
- Humbertostreptus
- Indiothauma
- Janardananeptus
- Junceustreptus
- Karschopisthus
- Ktenostreptus
- Lamellostreptus
- Leiotelus
- Leptostreptus
- Organognathus
- Philoporatia
- Phyllogonostreptus
- Picrogonopus
- Poratophilus
- Prominulostreptus
- Remulopygus
- Rhynchoproctus
- Sculptulistreptus
- Spissustreptus
- Spoliatogonus
- Stenurostreptus
- Thaiogonus
- Thyroglutus
- Thyropisthus
- Thyropygus
- Trigonostreptus
- Tuberogonus
- Uriunceustreptus
- Winklerostreptus
- Zinophora
