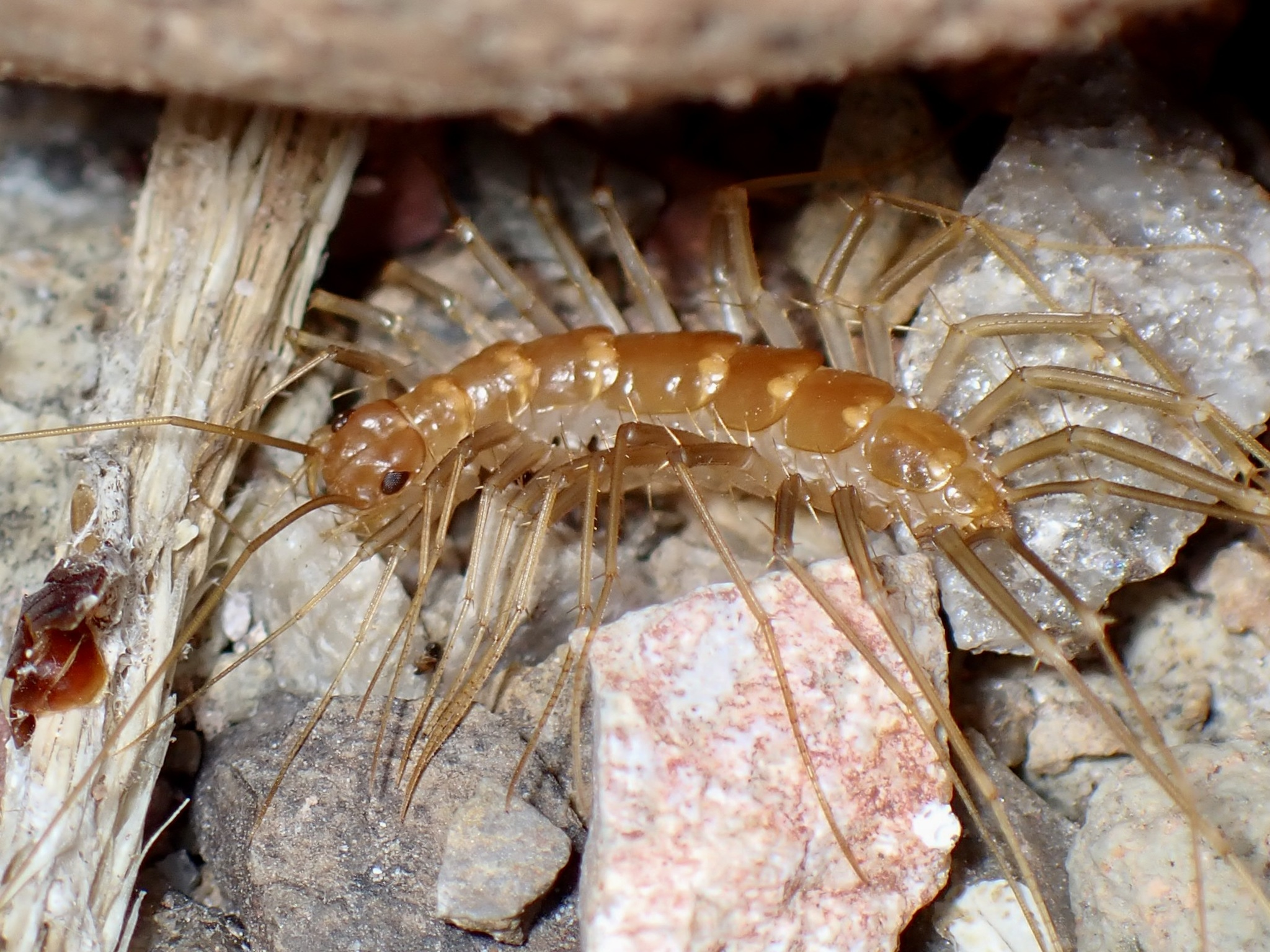

Scientific classification
- Kingdom: Animalia
- Phylum: Arthropoda
- Subphylum: Myriapoda
- Class: Chilopoda
- Order: Scutigeromorpha
- Family: Scutigeridae
- Genus: Scutigera
- Species: S. linceci

Binomial name
- Scutigera linceci Wood, 1867

Synonyms
- Dendrothereua homa (Chamberlin, 1942); Dendrothereua nubila (Chamberlin, 1921); Scutigera arborum Verhoeff, 1944; Scutigera dorothea Chamberlin, 1943; Scutigera homa Chamberlin, 1942; Scutigera mexicana de Saussure & Humbert, 1872; Scutigera nubila Chamberlin, 1921; Scutigera occidentalis F.Meinert, 1886; Scutigera phana Chamberlin, 1943

= Scutigera linceci =

Species of centipede

Scutigera linceci, the Arizona house centipede (originally described as Cermatia linceci) is a species of the Scutigeromorph centipede found in the Southern United States and Central America. Its species name refers to Dr. Gideon Lincecum, a field naturalist. In the wild, they live under stones and in hollow logs, but the species frequently enters human habitation.

== Appearance ==
Scutigera linceci is much smaller than the common house centipede, Scutigera coleoptrata, growing to only 3.8 centimetres (1.5 in), and can further by differentiated from the latter species by the shape of the head and tergites, and its colouration.
