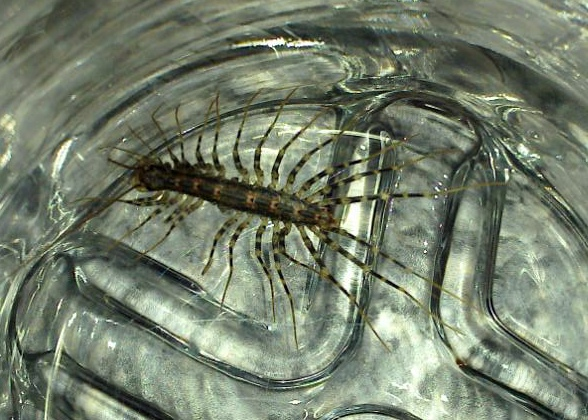
- Allothereua maculata

Scientific classification
- Kingdom: Animalia
- Phylum: Arthropoda
- Subphylum: Myriapoda
- Class: Chilopoda
- Order: Scutigeromorpha
- Family: Scutigeridae
- Genus: Allothereua; Verhoeff, 1905

= Allothereua =

Genus of centipedes

Allothereua is a genus of scutigeromorph centipedes containing 9 species ranging from Central Asia (Kazakhstan and Nepal) to the Philippines to Australia, where at least six species are found. A 2009 study of scutigeromorph phylogeny found Allothereua to be polyphyletic; some species were more closely related to Parascutigera. The genus name Allothereua comes from the Greek ἄλλος (állos) 'other' and θηρεύω (thēreúō) 'hunt'.

== Species ==
- Allothereua bidenticulata Verhoeff, 1925 - Australia
- Allothereua caeruleata Verhoeff, 1925 - Australia
- Allothereua incola Verhoeff, 1925 - Australia
- Allothereua kirgisorum Lignau, 1929 - Kazakhstan
- Allothereua lesueurii (Lucas, 1840) - Australia
- Allothereua maculata (Newport, 1844) - Australia
- Allothereua manila Chamberlin, 1944 - Philippines
- Allothereua serrulata Verhoeff, 1925 - Australia
- Allothereua wilsonae Dobroruka, 1979 - Nepal
