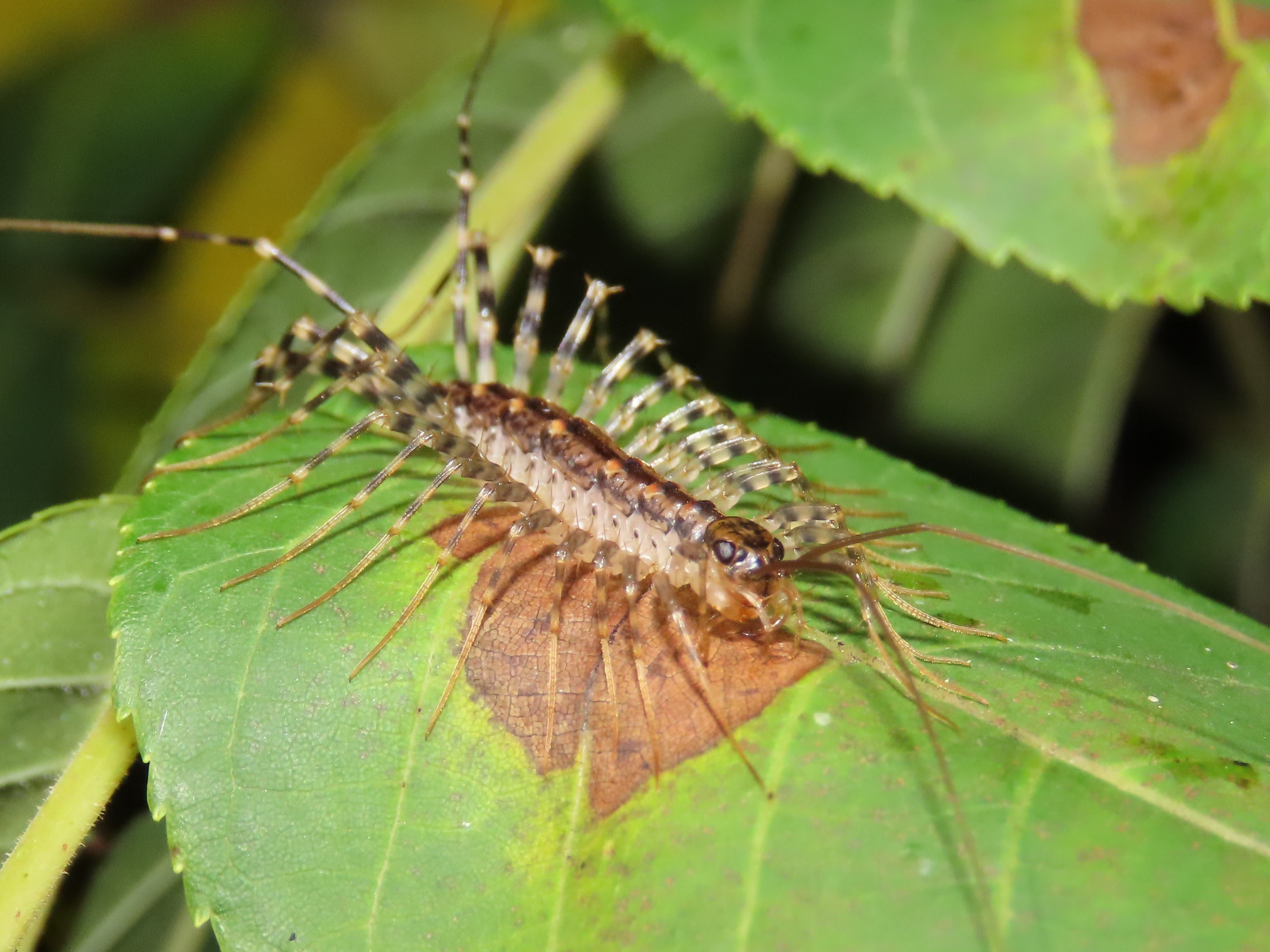

Scientific classification
- Domain: Eukaryota
- Kingdom: Animalia
- Phylum: Arthropoda
- Subphylum: Myriapoda
- Class: Chilopoda
- Order: Scutigeromorpha
- Family: Scutigeridae
- Genus: Thereuonema
- Species: T. tuberculata

Binomial name
- Thereuonema tuberculata (Wood, 1862)

Synonyms
- Thereuonema dilatationis Verhoeff, 1936; Thereuonema mandschuria Verhoeff, 1936; Thereuonema hilgendorfi Verhoeff, 1905; Thereuonema variata Miyoshi, 1939; Thereuonema bellica Muralewitsch, 1907; Thereuonema ballistes Muralewitsch, 1907; Thereuonema annulata Verhoeff, 1905

= Thereuonema tuberculata =

Species of centipede

Thereuonema tuberculata is a centipede species in the family Scutigeridae. It is native to China, the Korean peninsula, and Japan, and has recently been identified as an introduced species in North America where it is found primarily in the eastern United States, but has been found as far west as Nebraska. In its introduced range it is commonly confused with Scutigera coleoptrata.
