= Scutigera asiatica =

Scientific classification
- Domain: Eukaryota
- Kingdom: Animalia
- Phylum: Arthropoda
- Subphylum: Myriapoda
- Class: Chilopoda
- Order: Scutigeromorpha
- Family: Scutigeridae
- Genus: Scutigera
- Species: S. asiatica

Binomial name
- Scutigera asiatica Seliwanoff, 1894

Species of centipede

Scutigera asiatica is a species of centipede in the family Scutigeridae.
