= Dendrothereua =

Scientific classification
- Kingdom: Animalia
- Phylum: Arthropoda
- Subphylum: Myriapoda
- Class: Chilopoda
- Order: Scutigeromorpha
- Family: Scutigeridae
- Genus: Dendrothereua; Verhoeff, 1944

Genus of centipedes

Dendrothereua is a genus of house centipedes in the family Scutigeridae. There are at least three described species in Dendrothereua, found in the southern United States and the Neotropics.

Dendrothereua was formerly considered a taxonomic synonym of Scutigera. In 2009, Edgecomb and Giribet resurrected the genus based on Phylogenetic research. The species of Dendrothereua are still sometimes considered part of Scutigera.

== Species ==
These one species belong to the genus Dendrothereua:

- Dendrothereua linceci (Wood, 1867)^{i}

Data sources: i = ITIS, c = Catalogue of Life, g = GBIF, b = Bugguide.net
