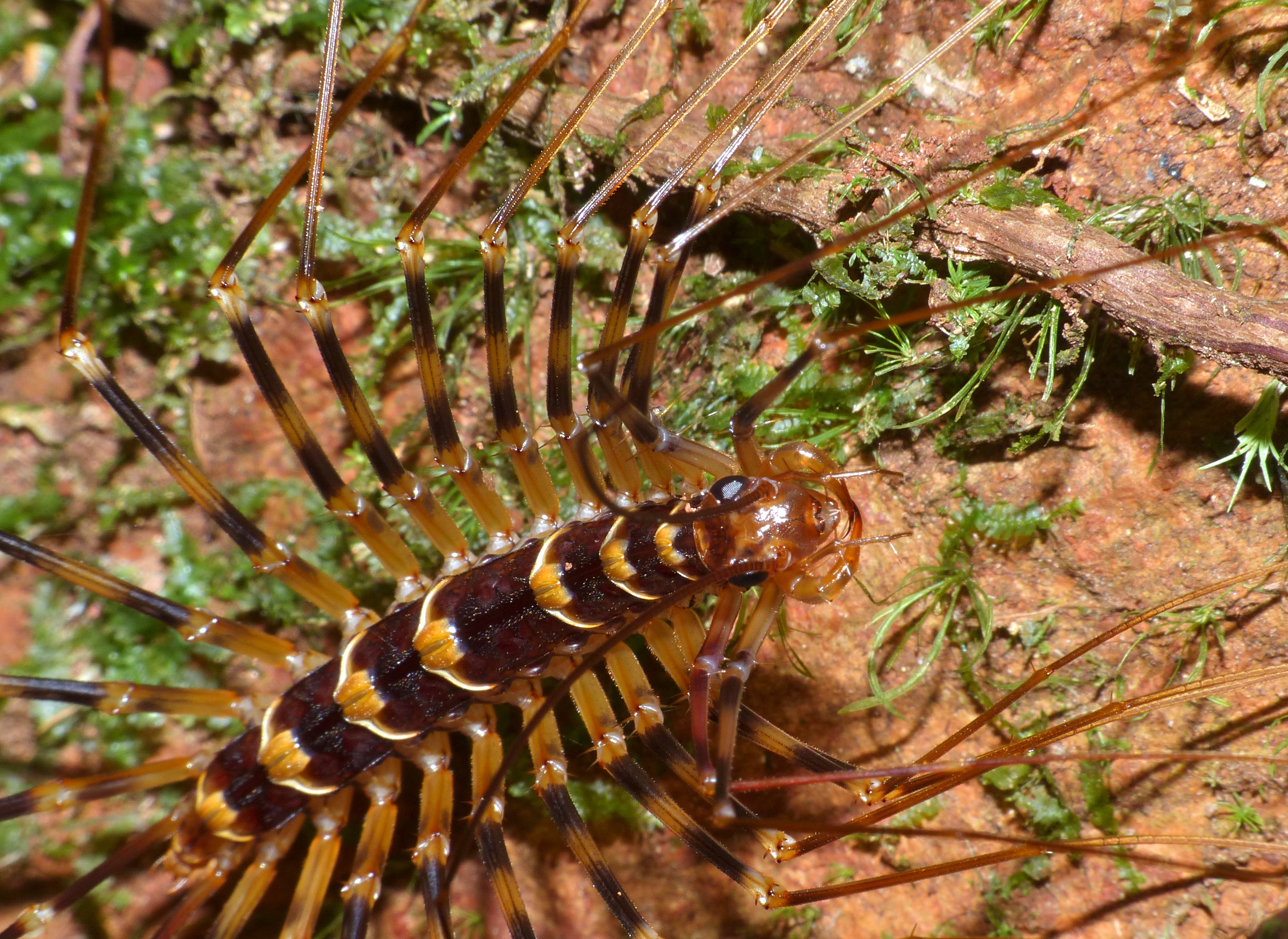

Scientific classification
- Kingdom: Animalia
- Phylum: Arthropoda
- Subphylum: Myriapoda
- Class: Chilopoda
- Order: Scutigeromorpha
- Family: Scutigeridae
- Genus: Thereuopoda
- Species: T. longicornis

Binomial name
- Thereuopoda longicornis (Fabricius, 1793)

= Thereuopoda longicornis =

Species of centipede

Thereuopoda longicornis, also known as the long-legged centipede, is a species of centipede in the Scutigeridae family. It was first described in 1793 by Johan Christian Fabricius.

== Distribution ==
The species has a wide range through southern and south-eastern Asia, extending to Queensland in north-eastern Australia.

== Behavior ==
The centipedes are solitary terrestrial predators that inhabit plant litter and soil.
