= Parascutigera guttata =

Scientific classification
- Kingdom: Animalia
- Phylum: Arthropoda
- Subphylum: Myriapoda
- Class: Chilopoda
- Order: Scutigeromorpha
- Family: Scutigeridae
- Genus: Parascutigera
- Species: P. guttata

Binomial name
- Parascutigera guttata Verhoeff, 1925

Synonyms
- Parascutigera aculeata Verhoeff, 1925; Parascutigera mjoebergi Verhoeff, 1925; Parascutigera noduligera Verhoeff, 1925; Parascutigera spinulata Verhoeff, 1925; Parascutigera viridula Verhoeff, 1925

Species of centipede

Parascutigera guttata is a species of centipede in the Scutigeridae family. It is endemic to Australia. It was first described in 1925 by German myriapodologist Karl Wilhelm Verhoeff.

== Distribution ==
The species occurs in Queensland. The type locality is Cedar Creek (now Ravenshoe) on the Atherton Tableland.

== Behaviour ==
The centipedes are solitary terrestrial predators that inhabit plant litter and soil.
