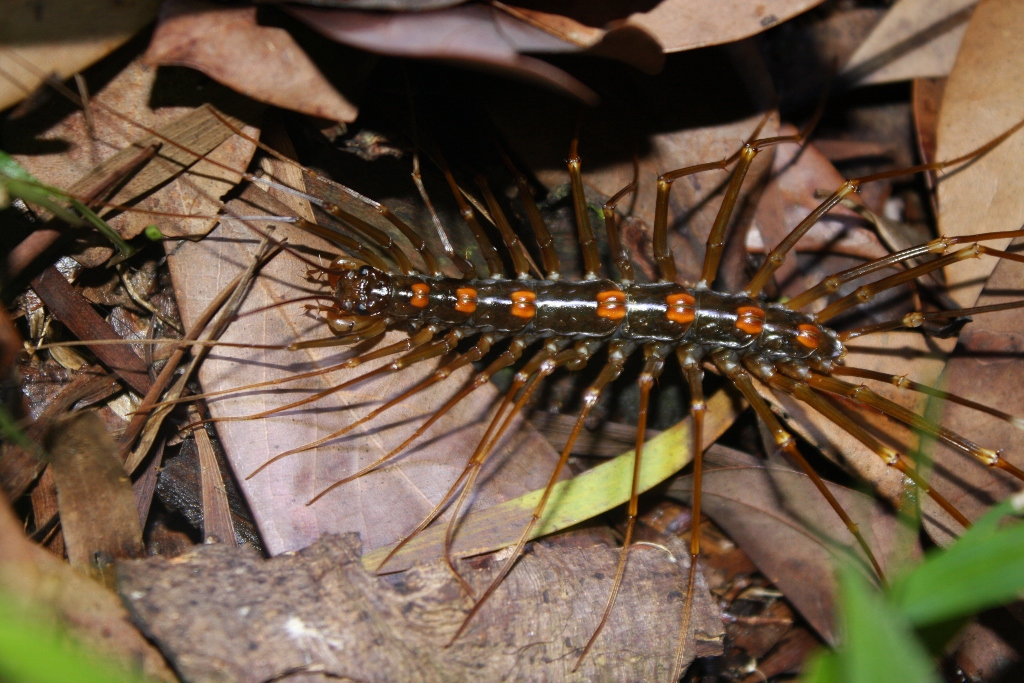

Scientific classification
- Kingdom: Animalia
- Phylum: Arthropoda
- Subphylum: Myriapoda
- Class: Chilopoda
- Order: Scutigeromorpha
- Family: Scutigeridae
- Genus: Thereuopoda
- Species: T. clunifera

Binomial name
- Thereuopoda clunifera Wood, 1862

= Thereuopoda clunifera =

Species of centipedes

Thereuopoda clunifera is a species of centipede in the genus Thereuopoda and the family Scutigeridae. It was described by Charles Thorold Wood in 1862. It has been seen visiting Mitrastemon yamamotoi flowers.
