= Thereuopodina queenslandica =

Scientific classification
- Kingdom: Animalia
- Phylum: Arthropoda
- Subphylum: Myriapoda
- Class: Chilopoda
- Order: Scutigeromorpha
- Family: Scutigeridae
- Genus: Thereuopodina
- Species: T. queenslandica

Binomial name
- Thereuopodina queenslandica Verhoeff, 1925

Species of centipede

Thereuopodina queenslandica is a species of centipede in the Scutigeridae family. It is endemic to Australia. It was first described in 1925 by German myriapodologist Karl Wilhelm Verhoeff.

== Subspecies ==
- Thereuopodina queenslandica queenslandica Verhoeff, 1925
- Thereuopodina queenslandica simplex Verhoeff, 1925

== Distribution ==
The species occurs in north-eastern Queensland. The type locality of T. q. queenslandica is Cedar Creek (now Ravenshoe); that of T. q. simplex is Malanda; both of which lie on the Atherton Tableland of Far North Queensland.

== Behaviour ==
The centipedes are solitary terrestrial predators that inhabit plant litter and soil.
