= Allothereua caeruleata =

Scientific classification
- Kingdom: Animalia
- Phylum: Arthropoda
- Subphylum: Myriapoda
- Class: Chilopoda
- Order: Scutigeromorpha
- Family: Scutigeridae
- Genus: Allothereua
- Species: A. caeruleata

Binomial name
- Allothereua caeruleata Verhoeff, 1925

Species of centipede

Allothereua caeruleata is a species of centipede in the Scutigeridae family. It is endemic to Australia. It was first described in 1925 by German myriapodologist Karl Wilhelm Verhoeff.

== Distribution ==
The species occurs in South Australia. The type locality is Adelaide.

== Behaviour ==
The centipedes are solitary terrestrial predators that inhabit plant litter and soil.
