= Parascutigera festiva =

Scientific classification
- Kingdom: Animalia
- Phylum: Arthropoda
- Subphylum: Myriapoda
- Class: Chilopoda
- Order: Scutigeromorpha
- Family: Scutigeridae
- Genus: Parascutigera
- Species: P. festiva

Binomial name
- Parascutigera festiva Ribaut, 1923

Species of centipede

Parascutigera festiva is a species of centipede in the Scutigeridae family. It is endemic to New Caledonia, a French overseas territory in Melanesia. It was first described in 1923 by French entomologist Henri Ribaut.

== Distribution ==
The species occurs on the main island of Grande Terre. The type locality is Mont Panié.
