= Parascutigera sphinx =

Scientific classification
- Kingdom: Animalia
- Phylum: Arthropoda
- Subphylum: Myriapoda
- Class: Chilopoda
- Order: Scutigeromorpha
- Family: Scutigeridae
- Genus: Parascutigera
- Species: P. sphinx

Binomial name
- Parascutigera sphinx Verhoeff, 1925

Species of centipede

Parascutigera sphinx is a species of centipede in the Scutigeridae family. It is endemic to Australia. It was first described in 1925 by German myriapodologist Karl Wilhelm Verhoeff.

== Distribution ==
The species occurs in south-west Western Australia. The type locality is Perth).

== Behaviour ==
The centipedes are solitary terrestrial predators that inhabit plant litter and soil.
