= Parascutigera dahli =

Scientific classification
- Kingdom: Animalia
- Phylum: Arthropoda
- Subphylum: Myriapoda
- Class: Chilopoda
- Order: Scutigeromorpha
- Family: Scutigeridae
- Genus: Parascutigera
- Species: P. dahli

Binomial name
- Parascutigera dahli Verhoeff, 1904

Species of centipede

Parascutigera dahli is a species of centipede in the Scutigeridae family. It was described in 1904 by German myriapodologist Karl Wilhelm Verhoeff.

== Distribution ==
The species occurs in New Britain, in the Bismarck Archipelago. The type locality is Ralum, Kokopo.
