= Scutigerina weberi =

Scientific classification
- Domain: Eukaryota
- Kingdom: Animalia
- Phylum: Arthropoda
- Subphylum: Myriapoda
- Class: Chilopoda
- Order: Scutigeromorpha
- Family: Scutigerinidae
- Genus: Scutigerina
- Species: S. weberi

Binomial name
- Scutigerina weberi Silvestri, 1903

Synonyms
- Scutigerides transvaalicus Silvestri,1903

Species of centipede

Scutigerina weberi is a species of centipedes in the family Scutigerinidae.

== Distribution ==
The species is found in Madagascar, Mozambique, Namibia, Zambia, Zimbabwe, Papua New Guinea, Sri Lanka, and New Caledonia.
