= Allothereua lesueurii =

Scientific classification
- Kingdom: Animalia
- Phylum: Arthropoda
- Subphylum: Myriapoda
- Class: Chilopoda
- Order: Scutigeromorpha
- Family: Scutigeridae
- Genus: Allothereua
- Species: A. lesueurii

Binomial name
- Allothereua lesueurii (Lucas, 1840)

Synonyms
- Scutigera lesueurii Lucas, 1840

Species of centipede

Allothereua lesueurii is a species of centipede in the Scutigeridae family. It is endemic to Australia. It was first described in 1840 by French entomologist Hippolyte Lucas.

== Distribution ==
The species occurs in Queensland and Western Australia.

== Behaviour ==
The centipedes are solitary terrestrial predators that inhabit plant litter and soil.
