= Allothereua bidenticulata =

Scientific classification
- Kingdom: Animalia
- Phylum: Arthropoda
- Subphylum: Myriapoda
- Class: Chilopoda
- Order: Scutigeromorpha
- Family: Scutigeridae
- Genus: Allothereua
- Species: A. bidenticulata

Binomial name
- Allothereua bidenticulata Verhoeff, 1925

Species of centipede

Allothereua bidenticulata is a species of centipede in the Scutigeridae family. It is endemic to Australia. It was first described in 1925 by German myriapodologist Karl Wilhelm Verhoeff.

== Distribution ==
The species occurs in Queensland, New South Wales, Victoria and south-west Western Australia. The type locality is Glen Lamington, in the Scenic Rim Region of south-eastern Queensland.

=== Subspecies ===
- Allothereua bidenticulata linderi Fahlander, 1939
- Allothereua bidenticulata vittata Verhoeff, 1925
- Allothereua bidenticulata bidenticulata Verhoeff, 1925

== Behaviour ==
The centipedes are solitary terrestrial predators that inhabit plant litter and soil.
