= House centipede =

A number of different centipede species in the family Scutigeridae are known as the house centipede, including:

- Scutigera coleoptrata, originally from the Mediterranean region, but now found almost worldwide
- Allothereua maculata, endemic to Australia
