= Thereuopodina tenuicornis =

Scientific classification
- Kingdom: Animalia
- Phylum: Arthropoda
- Subphylum: Myriapoda
- Class: Chilopoda
- Order: Scutigeromorpha
- Family: Scutigeridae
- Genus: Thereuopodina
- Species: T. tenuicornis

Binomial name
- Thereuopodina tenuicornis Verhoeff, 1905

Species of centipede

Thereuopodina tenuicornis is a species of centipedes in the family Scutigeridae. It is endemic to Sri Lanka.
