= S. aethiopica =

S. aethiopica, referring to Ethiopia, may refer to:

- Scutigera aethiopica, a centipede in the family Scutigeridae
- Sphodromantis aethiopica, a mantis in the family Mantidae
- Stachys aethiopica, a plant in the family Lamiaceae
- Stathmodera aethiopica, a beetle in the family Cerambycidae
- Stenalia aethiopica, a beetle in the family Mordellidae
- Stenoptilia aethiopica, a moth in the family Pterophoridae

== See also ==
- Aethiopica
