= Parascutigera peluda =

Scientific classification
- Kingdom: Animalia
- Phylum: Arthropoda
- Subphylum: Myriapoda
- Class: Chilopoda
- Order: Scutigeromorpha
- Family: Scutigeridae
- Genus: Parascutigera
- Species: P. peluda

Binomial name
- Parascutigera peluda Edgecombe, 2009

Species of centipede

Parascutigera peluda is a species of centipede in the Scutigeridae family. It is endemic to Australia. It was first described in 2009 by Gregory Edgecombe.

== Distribution ==
The species occurs in Queensland. The type locality is Mahogany Forest, Mount Moffatt National Park, Central Queensland.
