= Scutigera argentina =

Scientific classification
- Domain: Eukaryota
- Kingdom: Animalia
- Phylum: Arthropoda
- Subphylum: Myriapoda
- Class: Chilopoda
- Order: Scutigeromorpha
- Family: Scutigeridae
- Genus: Scutigera
- Species: S. argentina

Binomial name
- Scutigera argentina Humbert & de Saussure 1870

Species of centipede

Scutigera argentina is a species of centipede in the family Scutigeridae.
