= Thereuopodina =

Scientific classification
- Kingdom: Animalia
- Phylum: Arthropoda
- Subphylum: Myriapoda
- Class: Chilopoda
- Order: Scutigeromorpha
- Family: Scutigeridae
- Genus: Thereuopodina; Verhoeff, 1905

Type species
- Thereuopodina tenuicornis Verhoeff, 1905

Genus of centipedes

Thereuopodina is a genus of centipedes in the family Scutigeridae. It was described by German myriapodologist Karl Wilhelm Verhoeff in 1905.

== Species ==
There are three valid species:

- Thereuopodina adjutrix Verhoeff, 1936 - India
- Thereuopodina queenslandica Verhoeff, 1925 - Australia
- Thereuopodina tenuicornis Verhoeff, 1905 - Sri Lanka
