= Scutigerina =

Scientific classification
- Kingdom: Animalia
- Phylum: Arthropoda
- Subphylum: Myriapoda
- Class: Chilopoda
- Order: Scutigeromorpha
- Family: Scutigerinidae
- Genus: Scutigerina; Silvestri, 1904

Type species
- Scutigerina weberi Silvestri, 1903

Synonyms
- Scutigerides Silvestri, 1904; Madagassophora Verhoeff, 1936; Thereuopriona Verhoeff, 1936

Genus of centipedes

Scutigerina is a genus of centipedes in the family Scutigerinidae. It was described in 1904 by Italian myriapodologist Filippo Silvestri.

== Species ==
Valid species are:

- Scutigerina malagassa (de Saussure et Zehntner, 1902)
- Scutigerina weberi Silvestri, 1903
