= Scutigera aethiopica =

Scientific classification
- Domain: Eukaryota
- Kingdom: Animalia
- Phylum: Arthropoda
- Subphylum: Myriapoda
- Class: Chilopoda
- Order: Scutigeromorpha
- Family: Scutigeridae
- Genus: Scutigera
- Species: S. aethiopica

Binomial name
- Scutigera aethiopica Silvestri, 1895

Species of centipede

Scutigera aethiopica is a species of centipede in the family Scutigeridae. It is found in Ethiopia and Uganda.
