= Prionopodella =

Scientific classification
- Kingdom: Animalia
- Phylum: Arthropoda
- Subphylum: Myriapoda
- Class: Chilopoda
- Order: Scutigeromorpha
- Family: Scutigeridae
- Genus: Prionopodella; Verhoeff, 1925

Type species
- Prionopodella pectinigera Verhoeff, 1925

Genus of centipedes

Prionopodella is a monotypic genus of centipedes in the family Scutigeridae. It is endemic to Australia, with the type locality being Colosseum in the Gladstone Region of Queensland. It was described by German myriapodologist Karl Wilhelm Verhoeff in 1925. Its sole species is Prionopodella pectinigera Verhoeff, 1925.
