= S. argentina =

S. argentina may refer to:

- Scutigera argentina, a centipede
- Squatina argentina, the Argentine angelshark

== See also ==
- Argentina (disambiguation)
