= Prothereua =

Scientific classification
- Kingdom: Animalia
- Phylum: Arthropoda
- Subphylum: Myriapoda
- Class: Chilopoda
- Order: Scutigeromorpha
- Family: Scutigeridae
- Genus: Prothereua; Verhoeff, 1925

Type species
- Prothereua annulata Verhoeff, 1925

Genus of centipedes

Prothereua is a monotypic genus of centipedes in the family Scutigeridae. It is endemic to Australia, with the type locality being Perth in south-west Western Australia. It was described by German myriapodologist Karl Wilhelm Verhoeff in 1925. Its sole species is Prothereua annulata Verhoeff, 1925.
