= Gonethina =

Scientific classification
- Kingdom: Animalia
- Phylum: Arthropoda
- Subphylum: Myriapoda
- Class: Chilopoda
- Order: Scutigeromorpha
- Family: Pselliodidae
- Genus: Gonethina; Chamberlin, 1918

Type species
- Gonethina grenadensis Chamberlin, 1918

Genus of centipedes

Gonethina is a genus of centipedes in the family Pselliodidae. It was described by American myriapodologist Ralph Vary Chamberlin in 1918.

== Species ==
There are two valid species:

- Gonethina fijiana Chamberlin, 1920
- Gonethina grenadensis Chamberlin, 1918
