= Podothereua =

Scientific classification
- Kingdom: Animalia
- Phylum: Arthropoda
- Subphylum: Myriapoda
- Class: Chilopoda
- Order: Scutigeromorpha
- Family: Scutigeridae
- Genus: Podothereua; Verhoeff, 1905

Type species
- Podothereua insularum Verhoeff, 1905

Genus of centipedes

Podothereua is a monotypic genus of centipedes in the family Scutigeridae. It was described in 1905 by German myriapodologist Karl Wilhelm Verhoeff. Its sole species is Podothereua insularum Verhoeff, 1905.

== Distribution ==
The species occurs in New Britain, in the Bismarck Archipelago. The type locality is Ralum, Kokopo.

== Etymology ==
From the Greek πούς (poús), ποδός (podόs) 'leg' and θηρεύω (thēreúō) 'hunt'.
