= Gonethina fijiana =

Scientific classification
- Kingdom: Animalia
- Phylum: Arthropoda
- Subphylum: Myriapoda
- Class: Chilopoda
- Order: Scutigeromorpha
- Family: Pselliodidae
- Genus: Gonethina
- Species: G. fijiana

Binomial name
- Gonethina fijiana Chamberlin, 1920

Species of centipede

Gonethina fijiana is a species of centipede in the Pselliodidae family. It was described in 1920 by American myriapodologist Ralph Vary Chamberlin.

== Distribution ==
The species occurs in Fiji. The type locality is Mount Victoria.
