= Pesvarus =

Scientific classification
- Kingdom: Animalia
- Phylum: Arthropoda
- Subphylum: Myriapoda
- Class: Chilopoda
- Order: Scutigeromorpha
- Family: Scutigeridae
- Genus: Pesvarus; Würmli, 1974

Type species
- Pesvarus pachypus Würmli, 1974

Genus of centipedes

Pesvarus is a monotypic genus of centipedes in the family Scutigeridae. It is endemic to Australia, with the type locality being Yalgoo in south-west Western Australia. It was described by M. Würmli in 1974. Its sole species is Pesvarus pachypus Würmli, 1974.
