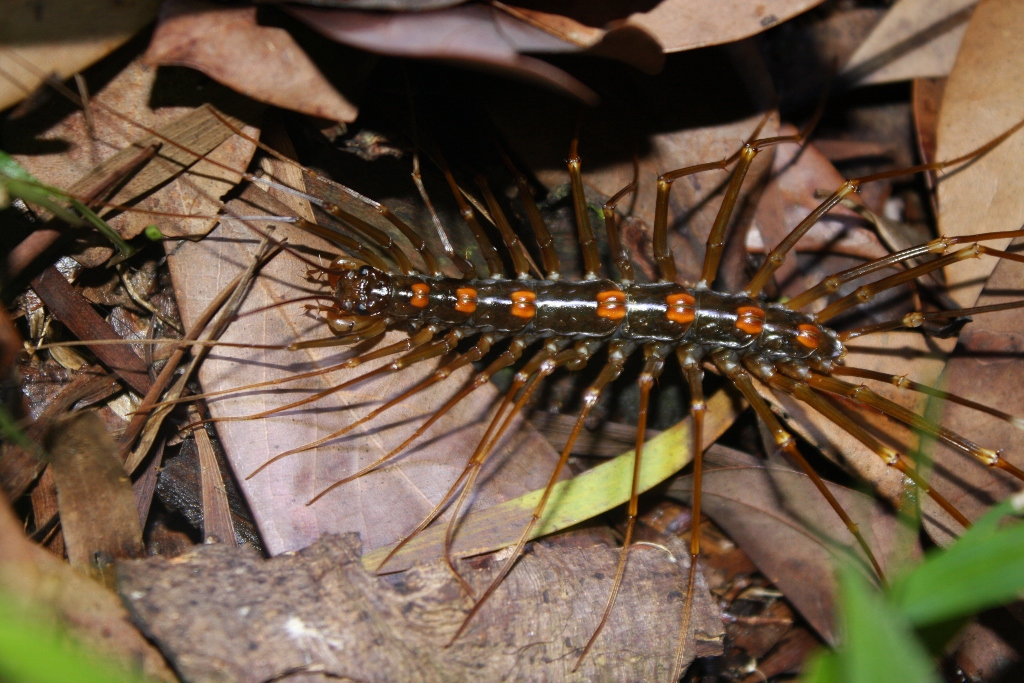
- A long-legged centipede (Thereuopoda clunifera), over 10 cm long, taken at Tai Mo Shan, Hong Kong

Scientific classification
- Kingdom: Animalia
- Phylum: Arthropoda
- Subphylum: Myriapoda
- Class: Chilopoda
- Order: Scutigeromorpha
- Family: Scutigeridae
- Genus: Thereuopoda; Verhoeff, 1904

Species
- See text

Synonyms
- Teleotelson Verhoeff, 1936; Orthothereua Verhoeff, 1905; Thereuonema (Thereuopoda) Verhoeff, 1904

= Thereuopoda =

Genus of centipedes

Thereuopoda is a genus of centipedes in the family Scutigeridae, from the Greek θηρεύω (thēreúō) 'hunt' and πούς (poús), ποδός (podόs) 'leg'.

== Species ==
- Thereuopoda chinensis
- Thereuopoda clunifera
- Thereuopoda longicornis
- Thereuopoda sandakana
