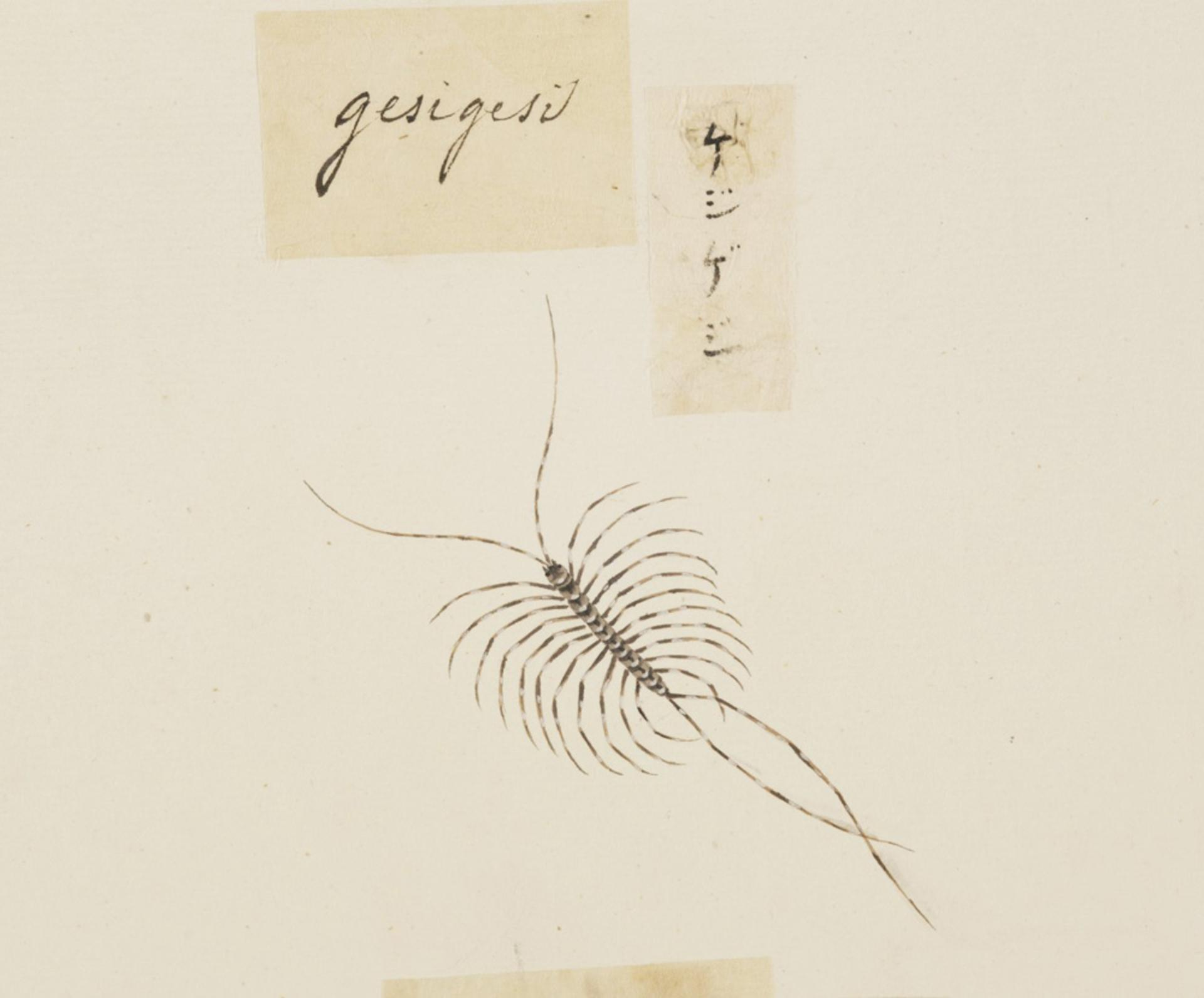
- drawing/water colour - Thereuonema tuberculata

Scientific classification
- Kingdom: Animalia
- Phylum: Arthropoda
- Subphylum: Myriapoda
- Class: Chilopoda
- Order: Scutigeromorpha
- Family: Scutigeridae
- Genus: Thereuonema; Verhoeff, 1904

Species
- T. erga; T. katharinae; T. syriaca; T. tuberculata; T. turkestana

= Thereuonema =

Genus of centipedes

Thereuonema is a centipede genus in the family Scutigeridae.

== Etymology ==
From the Greek θηρεύω (thēreúō) 'hunt' and νῆμα (nêma) 'thread'.
