= Ballonema =

Scientific classification
- Kingdom: Animalia
- Phylum: Arthropoda
- Subphylum: Myriapoda
- Class: Chilopoda
- Order: Scutigeromorpha
- Family: Scutigeridae
- Genus: Ballonema; Verhoeff, 1904

Type species
- Ballonema gracilipes Verhoeff, 1904

Genus of centipedes

Ballonema is a monotypic genus of centipedes in the family Scutigeridae. It was described in 1904 by German myriapodologist Karl Wilhelm Verhoeff. Its sole species is Ballonema gracilipes Verhoeff, 1904.

== Distribution ==
The species occurs in New Guinea. The type locality is Astrolabe Bay, Papua New Guinea.

== Etymology ==
From the Greek βάλλω (bállō) 'throw' and νῆμα (nêma) 'thread': 'thread thrower'.
