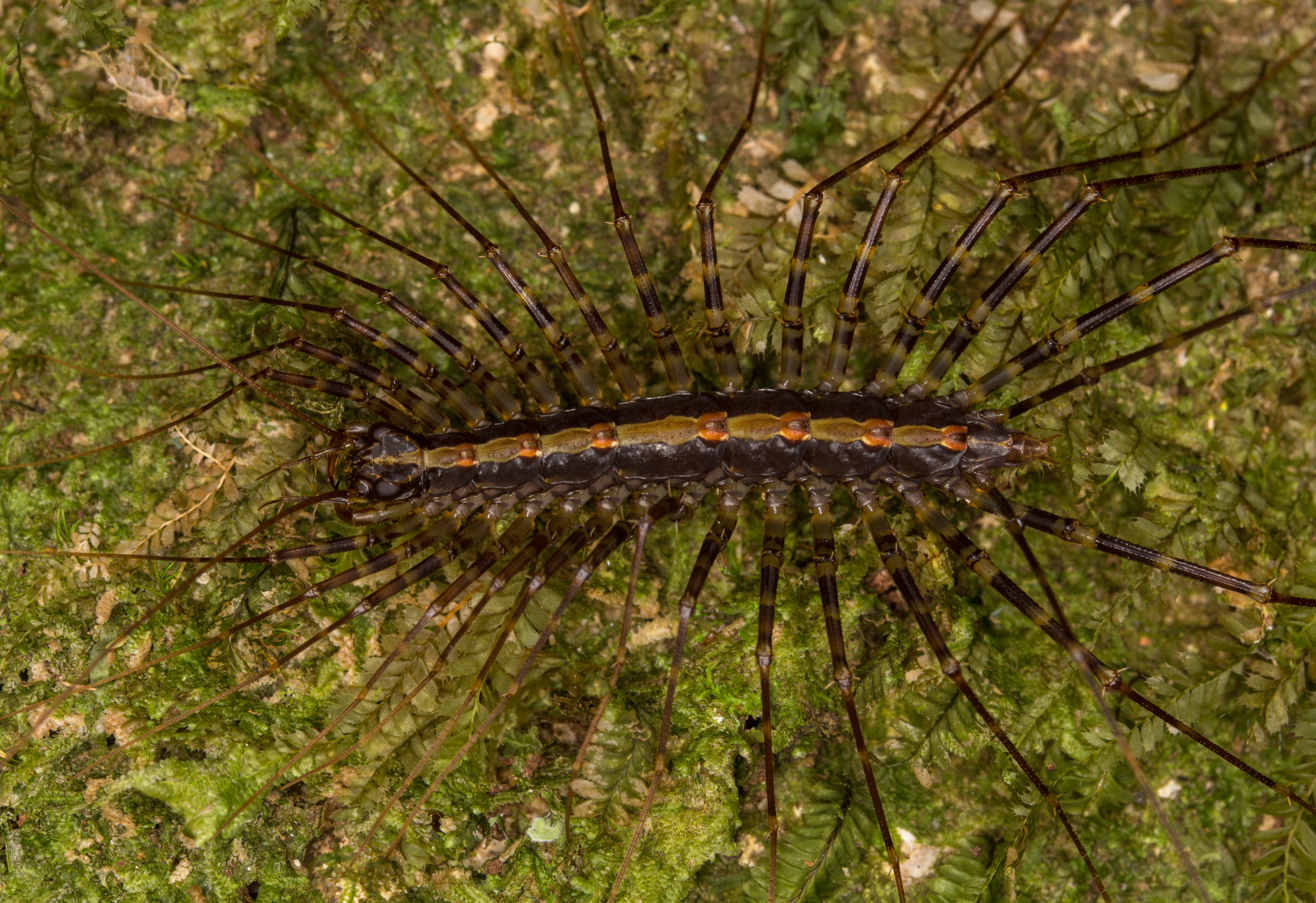
- Sphendononema guildingii
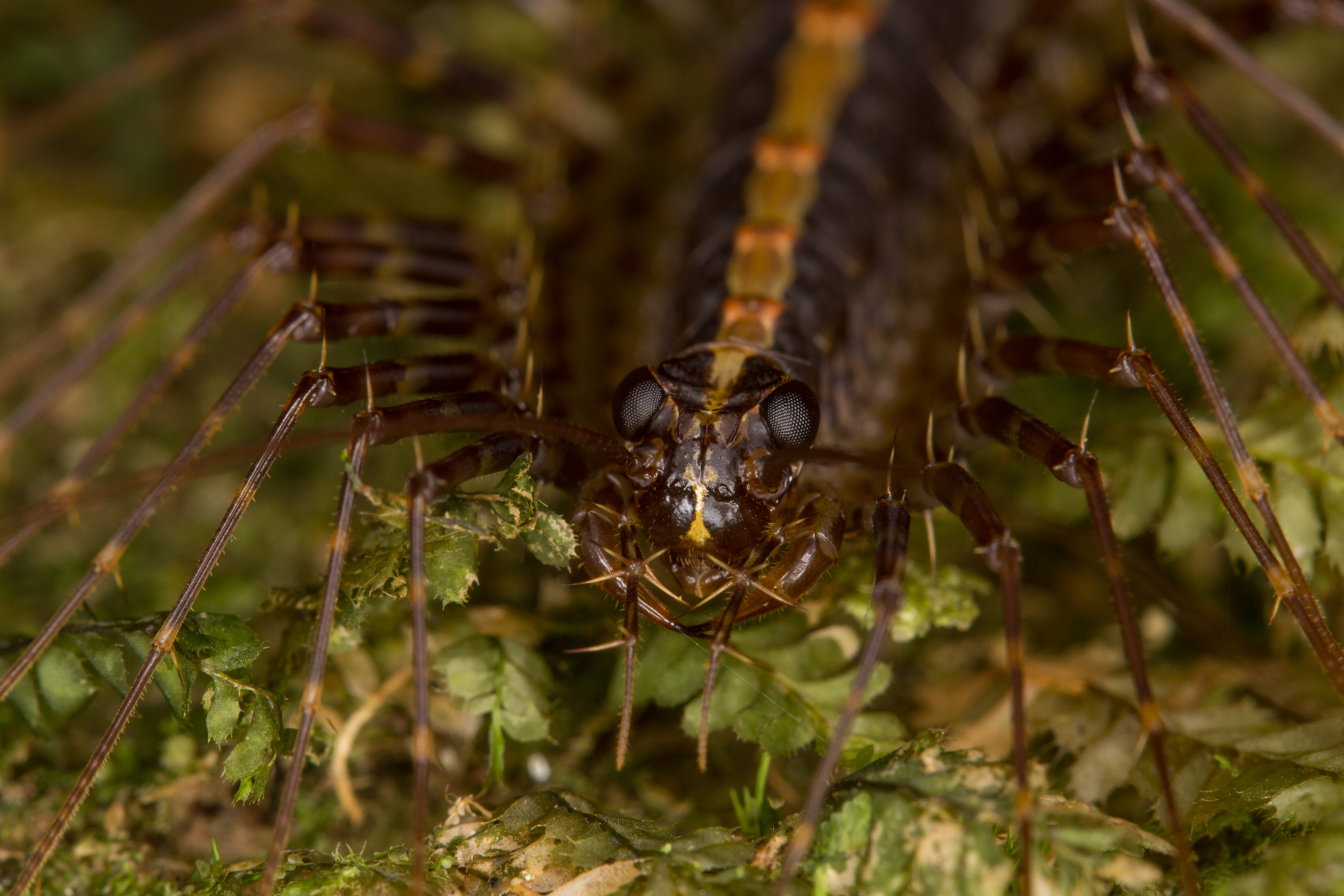
- Sphendononema guildingii

Scientific classification
- Kingdom: Animalia
- Phylum: Arthropoda
- Subphylum: Myriapoda
- Class: Chilopoda
- Order: Scutigeromorpha
- Family: Pselliodidae; Chamberlin, 1955

Type genus
- Pselliodes Chamberlin, 1921

= Pselliodidae =

Family of centipedes

Pselliodidae is a family of small centipedes, closely related to house centipedes.

== Genera and species ==
As of 2017, the Integrated Taxonomic Information System recognizes the following genera and species in Pselliodidae:

- Gonethella Chamberlin, 1918
  - Gonethella nesiotes Chamberlin 1918
- Gonethina Chamberlin, 1918
  - Gonethina fijiana Chamberlin 1920
  - Gonethina grenadensis Chamberlin 1918
- Sphendononema Verhoeff, 1904
  - Sphendononema chagualensis (Kraus, 1957)
  - Sphendononema guildingii (Newport, 1845)
  - Sphendononema rugosa (Newport, 1844)

In contrast, Gregory D. Edgecombe wrote this family comprises "at least three species in a single genus", only mentioning the genus Sphendononema and the species S. guildingii and S. rugosa.
