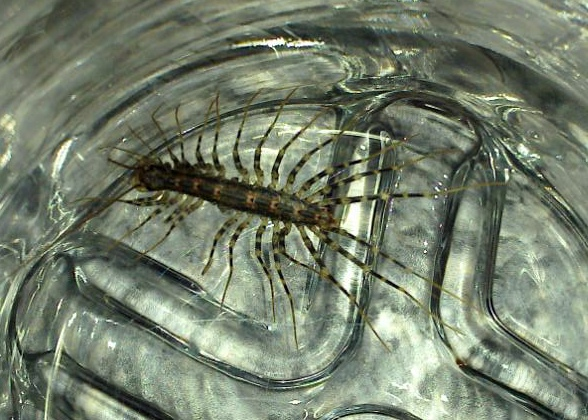

Scientific classification
- Kingdom: Animalia
- Phylum: Arthropoda
- Subphylum: Myriapoda
- Class: Chilopoda
- Order: Scutigeromorpha
- Family: Scutigeridae
- Genus: Allothereua
- Species: A. maculata

Binomial name
- Allothereua maculata (Newport, 1844)

Synonyms
- Cermatia maculata Newport 1844; Scutigera maculata (Newport, 1844); Allothereua australiana (Newport, 1845); Allothereua latreillei (Newport, 1845); Allothereua simplex (Haase, 1887); Allothereua violacea (L. Koch, 1865)

= Allothereua maculata =

Species of arthropod

Allothereua maculata is a species of centipedes found in Australia known as the house-centipede - a name applied elsewhere to other species.

== Description ==
The body of Allothereua maculata is made up of 15 segments and bears 15 pairs of long legs. The body is pale brown with dark markings, and grows to 20–25 millimetres (0.8–1.0 in) long. It bears one pair of antennae on the head and a similarly long pair of caudal appendages at the tail end. These organisms have a lot of small hairs and spindle-like bodies so scientists Haase and Heathcote believed that these features can behave as an organ but later discovered that it is not true; they have other functions. There was only limited research done but they understand that it was probably created to help with adaption.

== Distribution ==
Allothereua maculata is the most-common scutigeromorph centipede across southern Australia, occurring from Western Australia to Queensland.

== Ecology ==
Allothereua maculata lives in urban areas and woodland. Its occurrence in houses indicates that it prefers dampness and a lack of ventilation. A. maculata is a predator of insects and other arthropods, but is generally considered harmless.
