= Stathmodera truncata =

Scientific classification
- Kingdom: Animalia
- Phylum: Arthropoda
- Class: Insecta
- Order: Coleoptera
- Suborder: Polyphaga
- Infraorder: Cucujiformia
- Family: Cerambycidae
- Genus: Stathmodera
- Species: S. truncata

Binomial name
- Stathmodera truncata (Fairmaire, 1896)

Species of beetle

Stathmodera truncata is a species of beetle in the family Cerambycidae. It was described by Fairmaire in 1896.
