= Stathmodera wagneri =

Scientific classification
- Kingdom: Animalia
- Phylum: Arthropoda
- Class: Insecta
- Order: Coleoptera
- Suborder: Polyphaga
- Infraorder: Cucujiformia
- Family: Cerambycidae
- Genus: Stathmodera
- Species: S. wagneri

Binomial name
- Stathmodera wagneri Adlbauer, 2006

Species of beetle

Stathmodera wagneri is a species of beetle in the family Cerambycidae. It was described by Adlbauer in 2006. It is known from Kenya.
