= Stathmodera densesulcata =

Scientific classification
- Kingdom: Animalia
- Phylum: Arthropoda
- Class: Insecta
- Order: Coleoptera
- Suborder: Polyphaga
- Infraorder: Cucujiformia
- Family: Cerambycidae
- Genus: Stathmodera
- Species: S. densesulcata

Binomial name
- Stathmodera densesulcata Breuning, 1940

Species of beetle

Stathmodera densesulcata is a species of beetle in the family Cerambycidae. It was described by Breuning in 1940.
