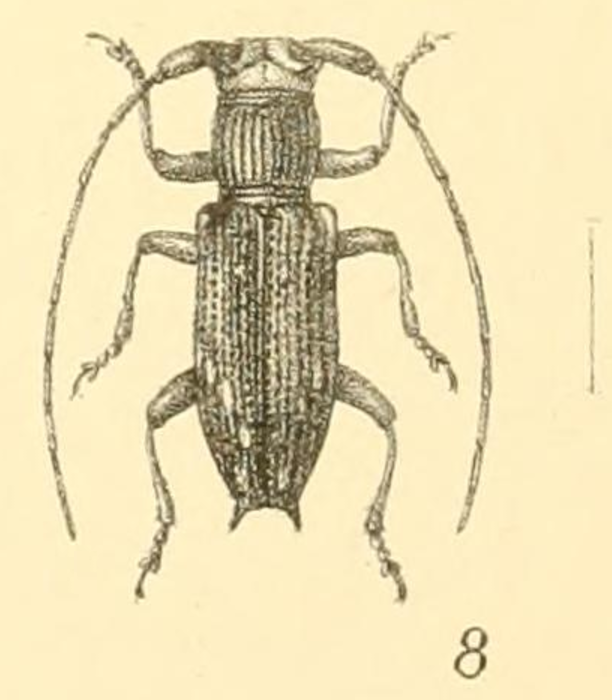

Scientific classification
- Kingdom: Animalia
- Phylum: Arthropoda
- Class: Insecta
- Order: Coleoptera
- Suborder: Polyphaga
- Infraorder: Cucujiformia
- Family: Cerambycidae
- Genus: Stathmodera
- Species: S. lineata

Binomial name
- Stathmodera lineata Gahan, 1890

= Stathmodera lineata =

Species of beetle

Stathmodera lineata is a species of beetle in the family Cerambycidae. It was described by Gahan in 1890. It is known from Sierra Leone.
