= Stathmodera conradti =

Scientific classification
- Kingdom: Animalia
- Phylum: Arthropoda
- Class: Insecta
- Order: Coleoptera
- Suborder: Polyphaga
- Infraorder: Cucujiformia
- Family: Cerambycidae
- Genus: Stathmodera
- Species: S. conradti

Binomial name
- Stathmodera conradti Breuning, 1960

Species of beetle

Stathmodera conradti is a species of beetle in the family Cerambycidae. It was described by Breuning in 1960.
