= Parascutigera =

Scientific classification
- Kingdom: Animalia
- Phylum: Arthropoda
- Subphylum: Myriapoda
- Class: Chilopoda
- Order: Scutigeromorpha
- Family: Scutigeridae
- Genus: Parascutigera; Verhoeff, 1904

Type species
- Parascutigera dahli Verhoeff,1904

Genus of centipedes

Parascutigera is a genus of centipedes in the family Scutigeridae. It was described by German myriapodologist Karl Wilhelm Verhoeff in 1904.

== Species ==
There are about 12 valid species, including:

- Parascutigera aequispinata Ribaut, 1923
- Parascutigera alveolus Ribaut, 1923
- Parascutigera dahli Verhoeff, 1904
- Parascutigera festiva Ribaut, 1923
- Parascutigera guttata Verhoeff, 1925
- Parascutigera latericia Ribaut, 1923
- Parascutigera lembehna Chamberlin, 1944
- Parascutigera montana Verhoeff, 1937
- Parascutigera nubila Ribaut, 1923
- Parascutigera peluda Edgecombe, 2009
- Parascutigera philippina Chamberlin, 1921
- Parascutigera sphinx Verhoeff, 1925
