= Pilbarascutigera =

Scientific classification
- Kingdom: Animalia
- Phylum: Arthropoda
- Subphylum: Myriapoda
- Class: Chilopoda
- Order: Scutigeromorpha
- Family: Scutigeridae
- Genus: Pilbarascutigera; Edgecombe & Barrow]], 2007

Type species
- Allothereua incola Verhoeff,1925

Genus of centipedes

Pilbarascutigera is a monotypic genus of centipedes in the family Scutigeridae. It is endemic to Australia, with the type locality being Broome in the Kimberley region of far north Western Australia. It was described by Gregory Edgecombe and Lauren Barrow in 2007. Its sole species is Pilbarascutigera incola (Verhoeff, 1925).
