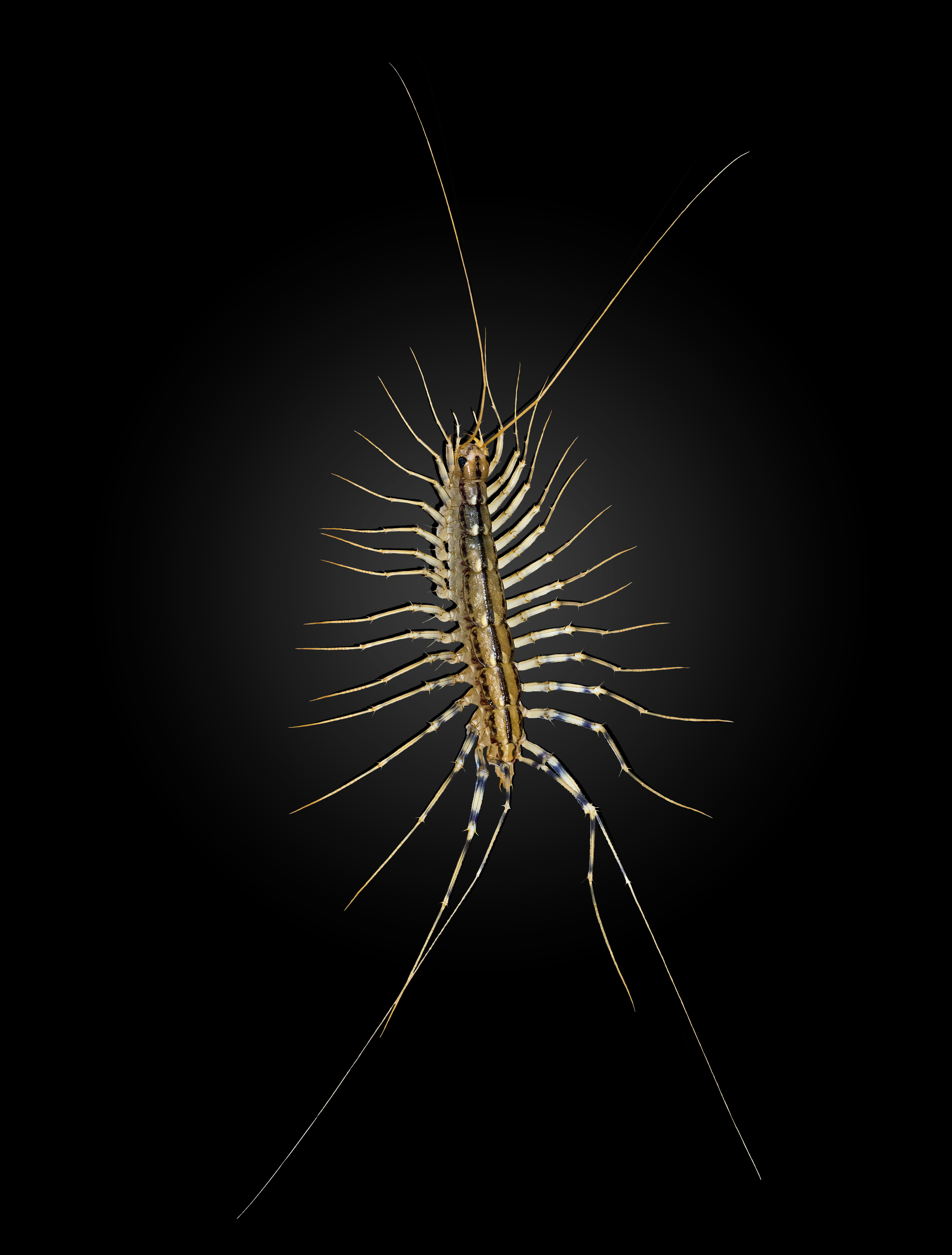
- Scutigera coleoptrata, the house centipede

Scientific classification
- Kingdom: Animalia
- Phylum: Arthropoda
- Subphylum: Myriapoda
- Class: Chilopoda
- Order: Scutigeromorpha
- Family: Scutigeridae
- Genus: Scutigera; Lamarck, 1801

Type species
- Scutigera coleoptrata Linnaeus, 1758, by original designation.

Species
- See text

Synonyms
- Cermatia Illiger, 1807; Cryptomera Rafinesque, 1820; Dendrothereua Verhoeff, 1944; Lassophora Verhoeff, 1905; Selista Rafinesque, 1820

= Scutigera =

Scutigera Temporal range: 37.2–0 Ma Eocene to present

Genus of centipedes

Scutigera is a centipede genus in the scutigeromorph (house centipede) family Scutigeridae, a group of centipedes with long limbs and true compound eyes (which were once thought to be secondary, re-evolved "pseudofacetted eyes"). It is composed of more than 30 species, including the most common and well-studied species, Scutigera coleoptrata.

== Species ==
=== Extant species ===
- Scutigera aethiopica
- Scutigera argentina
- Scutigera asiatica
- Scutigera buda
- Scutigera carrizala
- Scutigera chichivaca
- Scutigera coleoptrata
- Scutigera complanata
- Scutigera dubia
- Scutigera fissiloba
- Scutigera flavistoma
- Scutigera hispida
- Scutigera linceci
- Scutigera longitarsis
- Scutigera marmorea
- Scutigera melanostoma
- Scutigera nossibei
- Scutigera oweni
- Scutigera oxypyga
- Scutigera parcespinosa
- Scutigera planiceps
- Scutigera poicila
- Scutigera rubrilineata
- Scutigera sanguinea
- Scutigera sinuata
- Scutigera smithii
- Scutigera tancitarona
- Scutigera tonsoris
- Scutigera virescens
- Scutigera voeltzkowi

=== Fossil species ===
- Scutigera illigeri, Eocene of Poland (Baltic amber)
- Scutigera leachi, Eocene of Poland (Baltic amber)
