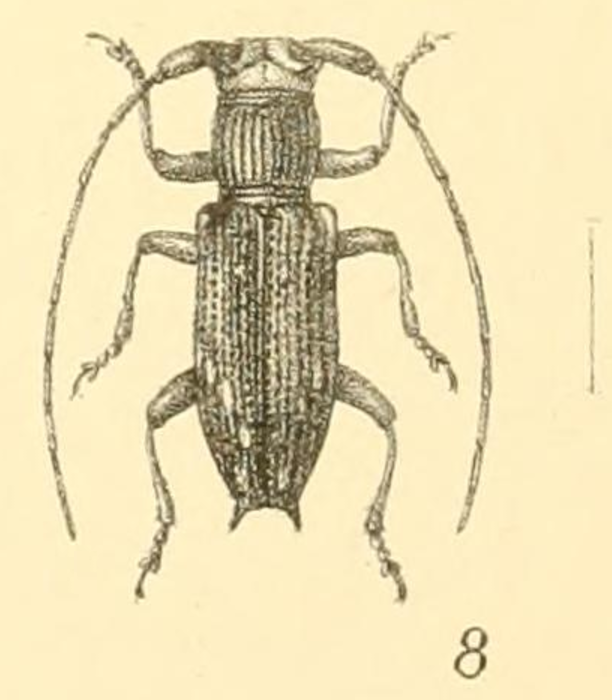
- Stathmodera lineata

Scientific classification
- Kingdom: Animalia
- Phylum: Arthropoda
- Class: Insecta
- Order: Coleoptera
- Suborder: Polyphaga
- Infraorder: Cucujiformia
- Family: Cerambycidae
- Subfamily: Lamiinae
- Tribe: Apomecynini
- Genus: Stathmodera; Gahan, 1890

= Stathmodera =

Genus of beetles

Stathmodera is a genus of beetles in the family Cerambycidae, containing the following species:

- Stathmodera aethiopica Breuning, 1940
- Stathmodera conradti Breuning, 1960
- Stathmodera densesulcata Breuning, 1940
- Stathmodera flavescens Breuning, 1940
- Stathmodera grisea Breuning, 1939
- Stathmodera lineata Gahan, 1890
- Stathmodera minima Breuning, 1960
- Stathmodera pusilla Aurivillius, 1907
- Stathmodera subvittata Breuning, 1981
- Stathmodera truncata (Fairmaire, 1896)
- Stathmodera unicolor Breuning, 1960
- Stathmodera vittata Breuning, 1940
- Stathmodera wagneri Adlbauer, 2006
