= Scutigerinidae =

Scientific classification
- Domain: Eukaryota
- Kingdom: Animalia
- Phylum: Arthropoda
- Subphylum: Myriapoda
- Class: Chilopoda
- Order: Scutigeromorpha
- Family: Scutigerinidae; Attems, 1926

Family of centipedes

Scutigerinidae is a family of centipedes restricted to southern Africa, Madagascar and Melanesia, containing a single genus, Scutigerina.
