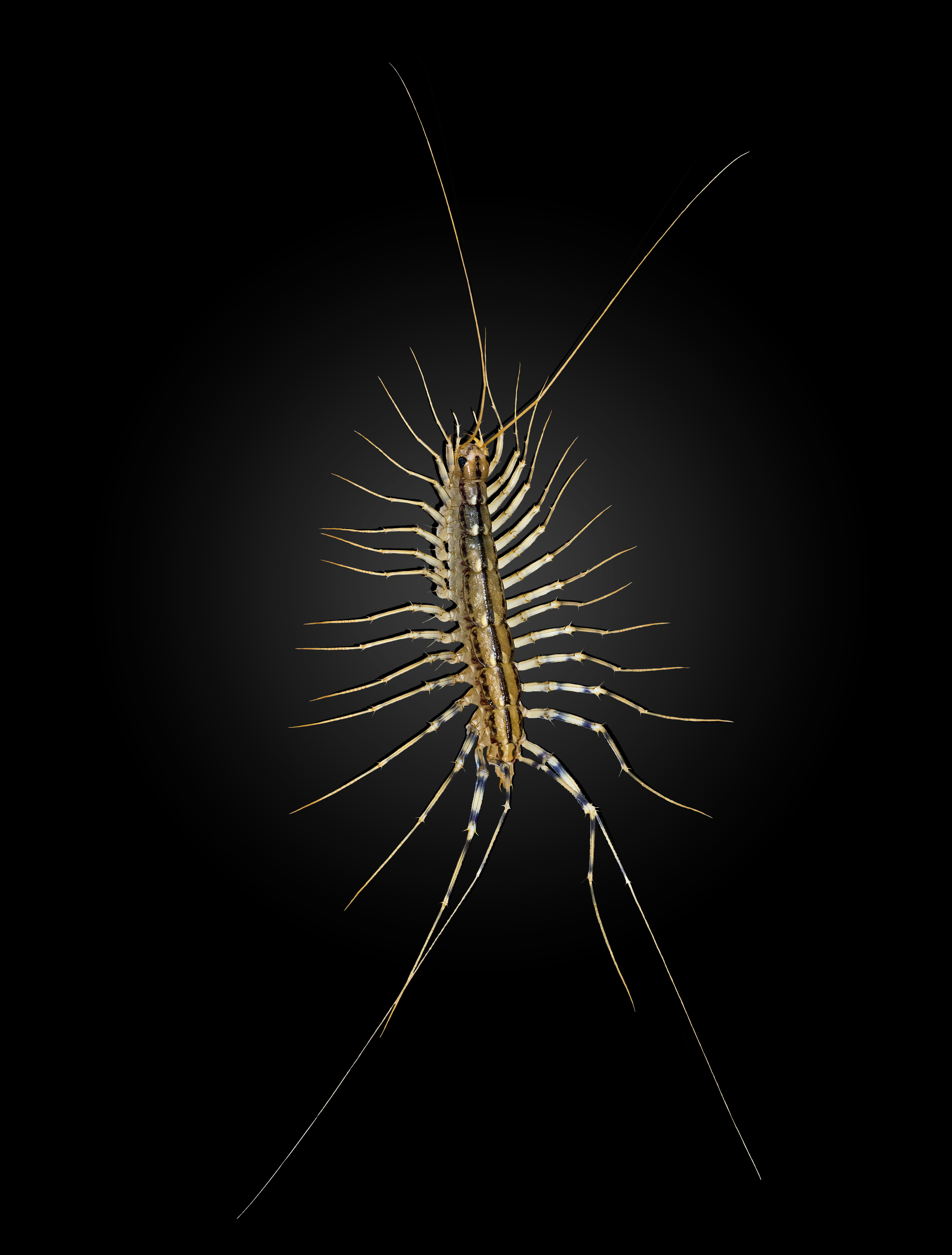

Scientific classification
- Kingdom: Animalia
- Phylum: Arthropoda
- Subphylum: Myriapoda
- Class: Chilopoda
- Order: Scutigeromorpha
- Family: Scutigeridae
- Genus: Scutigera
- Species: S. coleoptrata

Binomial name
- Scutigera coleoptrata (Linnaeus, 1758)

Synonyms
- Scutigera forceps

= Scutigera coleoptrata =

House centipede

Species of arthropod

Scutigera coleoptrata, also known as the house centipede, is a species of centipede that is typically yellowish-gray and has up to 15 pairs of long legs. Originating in the Mediterranean region, it has spread to other parts of the world, where it frequently lives in and around human homes. It is an insectivore, preying on insects and arachnids by envenomating them. Their mild venom and small organs of envenomation render the species nearly incapable of harming humans.

== Etymology ==
In 1758, Carl Linnaeus described the species in the tenth edition of his Systema Naturae, giving the name Scolopendra coleoptrata, writing that it has a "coleopterated thorax" (similar to a coleopter). In 1801, Jean-Baptiste Lamarck separated Scutigera from Scolopendra, calling this species Scutigera coleoptrata. The word scutigera comes from Latin gerere 'to bear' and scutum 'shield', because of the shape of the plates in the back of the chilopod.

== Morphology ==
The body of an adult Scutigera coleoptrata is typically 25 to 35 mm (1.0 to 1.4 in) in length, although larger specimens are sometimes encountered. Up to 15 pairs of long legs are attached to the rigid body. Together with the antennae they give the centipede an appearance of being 75 to 100 mm (3 to 4 in) in length. The delicate legs enable it to reach surprising speeds of up to 0.4 meters per second (1.3 ft/s) running across floors, up walls and along ceilings. Its body is yellowish-gray and has three dark dorsal stripes running down its length; the legs also have dark stripes. S. coleoptrata has developed automimicry in that its tail-like hind legs present the appearance of antennae. When the centipede is at rest, it is not easy to tell its cranial end from its caudal end.

Unlike most other centipedes, house centipedes and their close relatives have well-developed faceted eyes.

== Reproduction and development ==
House centipedes lay their eggs in spring. In a laboratory observation of 24 house centipedes, an average of 63 and a maximum of 151 eggs were laid. As with many other arthropods, the larvae look like miniature versions of the adult, albeit with fewer legs. Young centipedes have four pairs of legs when they are hatched. They gain a new pair with the first molting, and two pairs with each of their five subsequent moltings. Adults with 15 pairs of legs retain that number through three more molting stages (sequence 4-5-7-9-11-13-15-15-15-15 pairs).

House centipedes live anywhere from three to seven years, depending on the environment. They can start breeding in their third year. To begin mating, the male and female circle around each other. They initiate contact with their antennae. The male deposits his sperm on the ground and the female then uses it to fertilize her eggs.

== Behavior and ecology ==
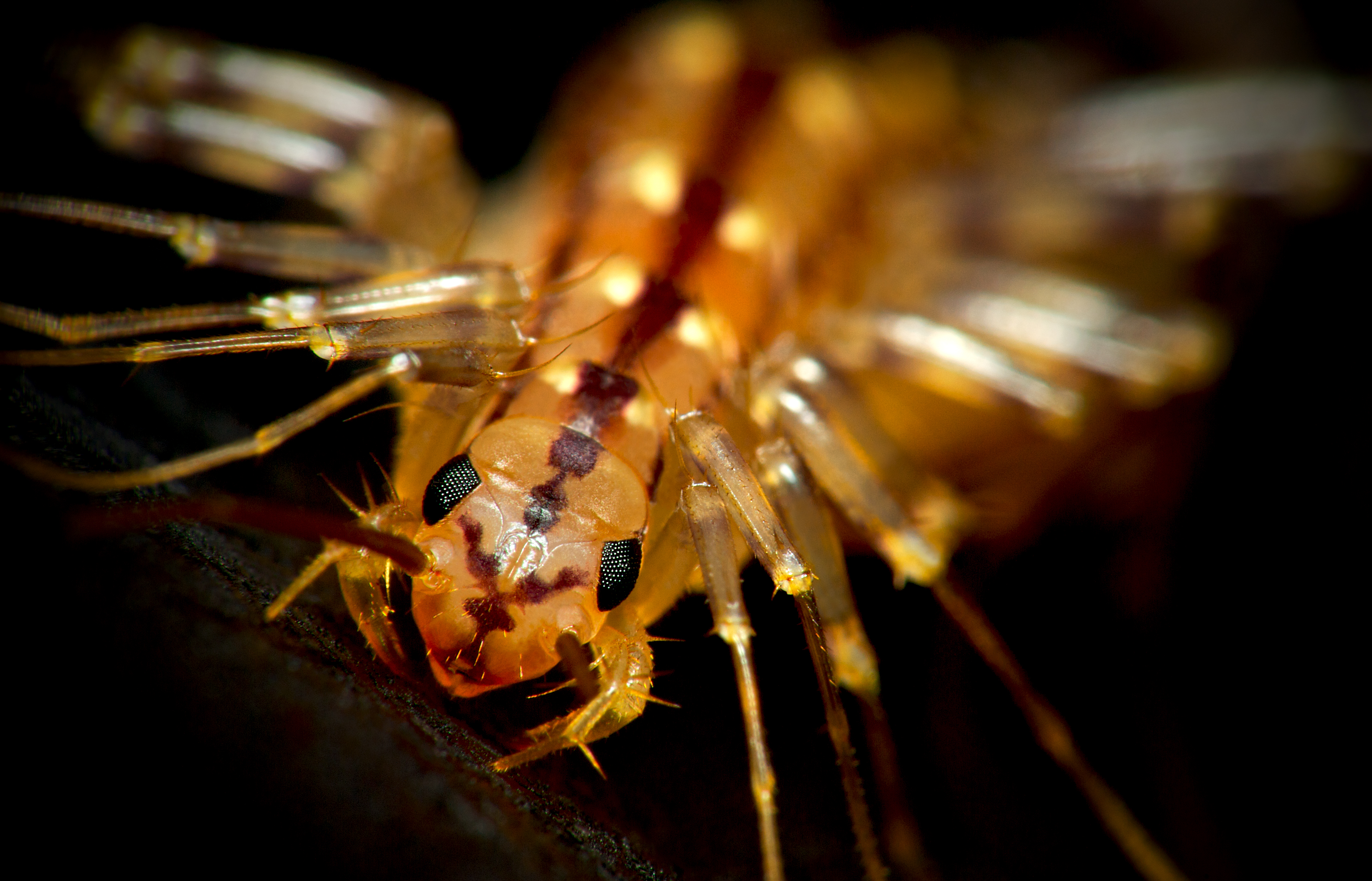
Closeup of the head showing forcipules

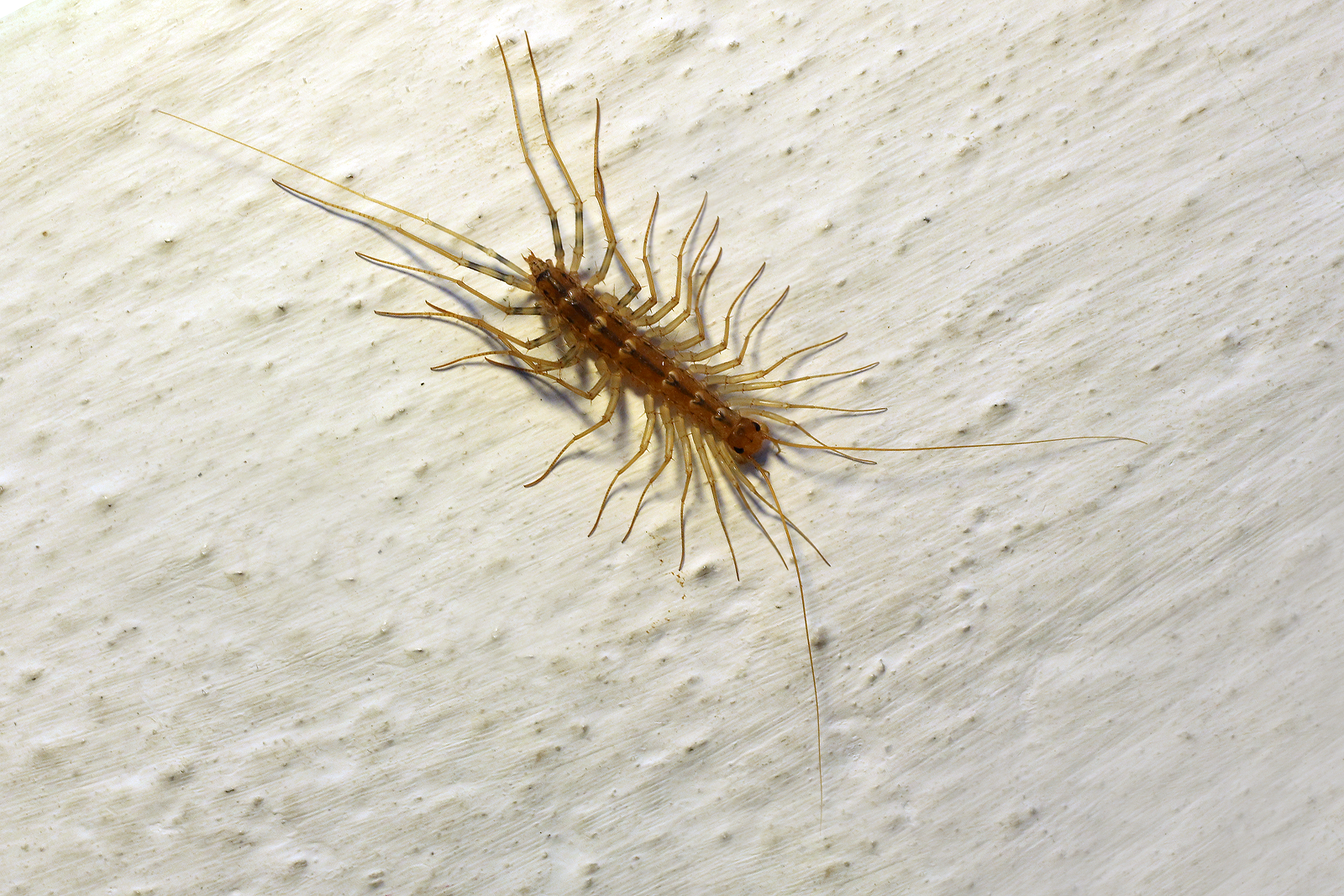
Scutigera coleoptrata resting on a wall. The antennae are approximately 2 cm long.

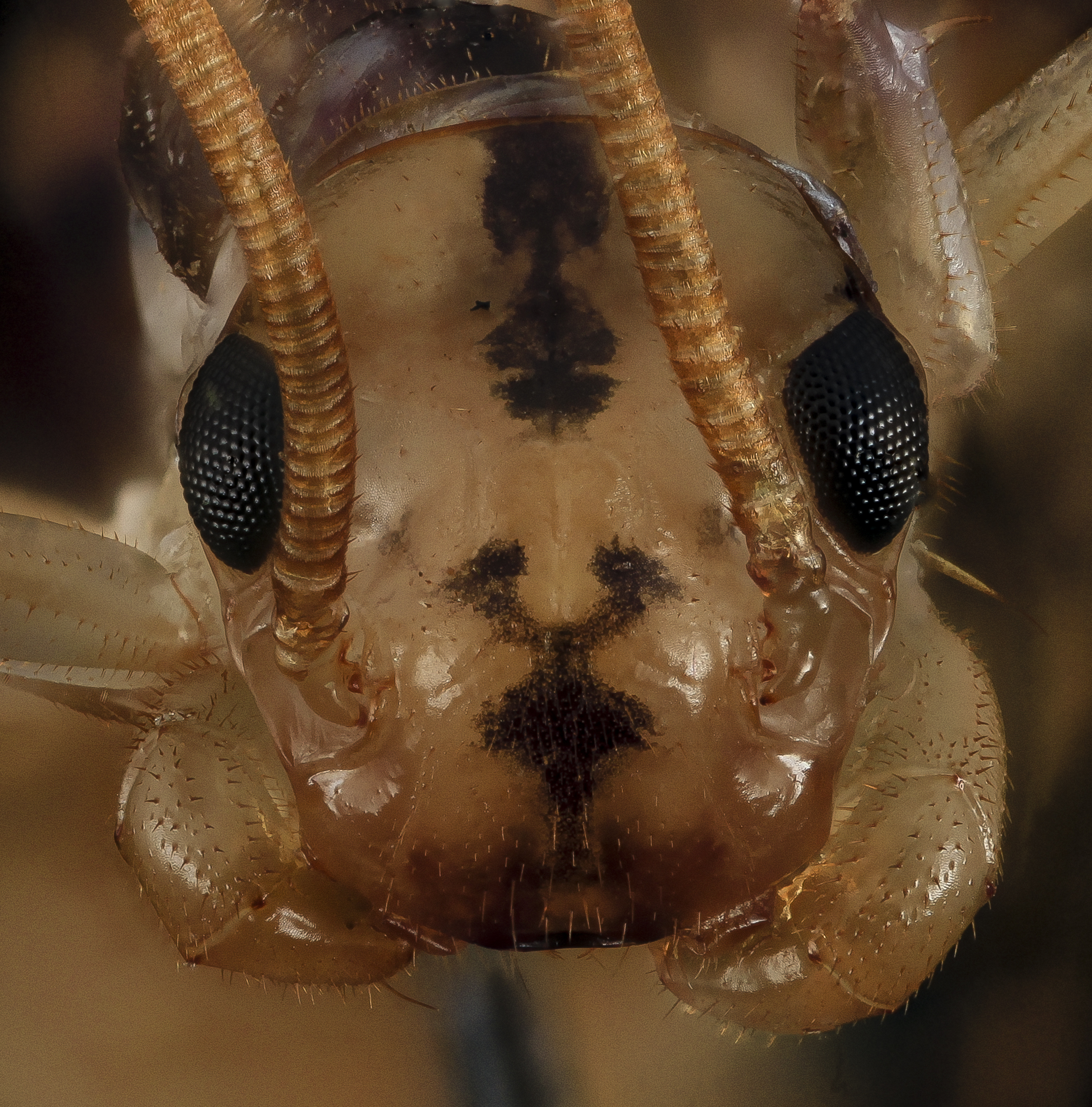
Head close-up magnified

House centipedes feed on spiders, bed bugs, termites, cockroaches, silverfish, ants, and other household arthropods. They administer venom by stinging with forcipules. They are mostly nocturnal hunters. Despite their developed eyes, they seem to rely mostly on their antennae when hunting, which are sensitive to both smells and touch. They use both their mandibles and their legs for holding prey, allowing them to deal with several small insects at the same time. To capture prey they either jump onto it or use their legs in a technique described as "lassoing". Using their legs to beat prey has also been described. Like other centipedes they can stridulate.

In a feeding study, S. coleoptrata showed the ability to distinguish between possible prey, avoiding dangerous insects. They also adapted their feeding pattern to the type of hazard the prey might pose to them. For wasps, they retreat after applying the venom to give it time to take effect. When the centipede is in danger of becoming prey itself, it can detach any legs that have become trapped. House centipedes have been observed to groom their legs by curling around and grooming them with their forcipules.

In 1902, C. L. Marlatt, an entomologist with the United States Department of Agriculture, wrote a brief description of the house centipede:

It may often be seen darting across floors with very great speed, occasionally stopping suddenly and remaining absolutely motionless, presently to resume its rapid movements, often darting directly at inmates of the house, particularly women, evidently with a desire to conceal itself beneath their dresses, and thus creating much consternation.

== Habitat ==
Outdoors, house centipedes prefer to live in cool, damp places. Centipede respiratory systems do not provide any mechanism for shutting the spiracles, and that is why they need an environment that protects them from dehydration and excessive cold. Most live outside, primarily under large rocks, woodpiles, barkdust and especially under piles of leaves or compost. They often emerge from hiding during the watering of gardens or flowerbeds. These centipedes can be found in almost any part of the house, although they are usually encountered in dark or dimly lit areas such as basements and garages. Inside the home, they can be found in bathrooms, lavatories and kitchens, which tend to be humid, but they can also be found in drier places like offices, bedrooms and dining rooms. They are usually seen crawling along the ground or floor, but they are capable of climbing walls and can move very quickly when startled. The greatest likelihood of encountering them is in spring, when they emerge due to warmer weather and in autumn, when the cooling weather forces them to seek shelter in human habitats.

== Distribution ==
Scutigera coleoptrata is indigenous to the Mediterranean region, but it has spread through much of Europe, Asia, North America and South America. It has also been introduced to Australia.

== Biological details ==
The faceted eyes of S. coleoptrata are sensitive to daylight and very sensitive to ultraviolet light. They were shown to be able to visually distinguish between different mutations of Drosophila melanogaster. How this ability fits with its nocturnal lifestyle and underground natural habitat is still under study. They do not instantly change direction when light is suddenly shone at them, but will retreat to a darker hiding spot.

Some of the plates covering the body segments fused and became smaller during the evolution to the current state of S. coleoptrata. The resulting mismatch between body segments and dorsal plates (tergites) is the cause for this centipede's rigid body.

Relation between body segments, dorsal plates (tergites), and leg pairs
Tergite	1	2	3	4	5	6	7	8	9	10	11
Segments	1	2	3, 4	5, 6	7, 8, 9	10, 11	12, 13	14, 15	16	17	18 (telson)
Leg pairs	Forcipules	1	2, 3	4, 5	6, 7, 8	9, 10	11, 12	13, 14	15 (antenna-like snare legs)	(gonopod)	(anus)

Tergites 10 and 11 are not fully developed and segment 18 does not have a sternite. This model deviates from descriptions by Lewis who identified only 7 tergites and 15 segments.

Another feature that sets S. coleoptrata apart from other centipedes is that their hemolymph was found to contain proteins for transporting oxygen.

The mitochondrial genome of S. coleoptrata has been sequenced. This opened up discussions on the taxonomy and phylogeny of this and related species.

== Interaction with humans ==
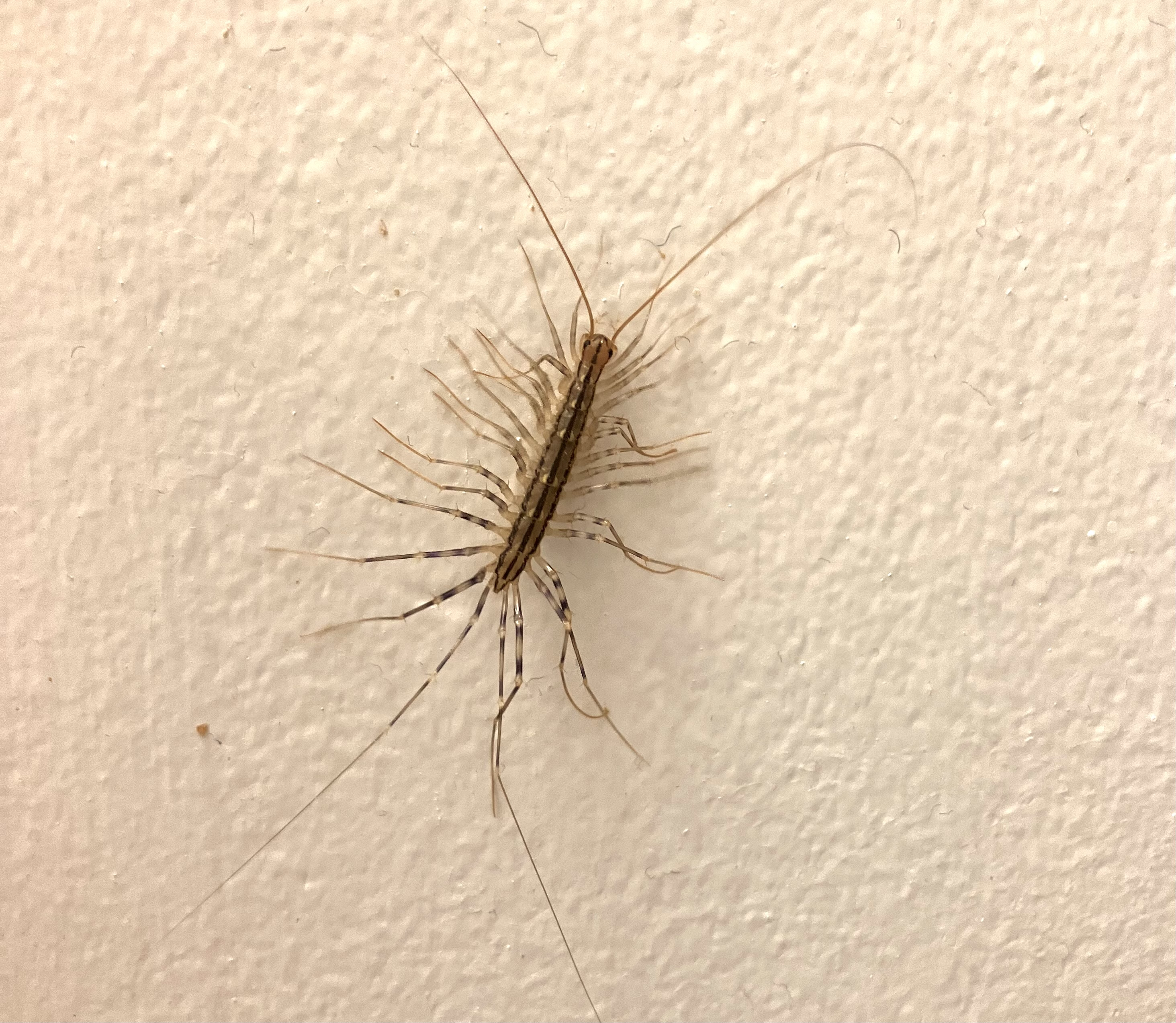
S. coleoptrata in a residential washroom

Unlike its shorter-legged but larger tropical cousins, S. coleoptrata can live its entire life inside a building, usually on the ground levels of homes. While many homeowners may be unsettled by house centipedes due to their speed and appearance, they pose essentially no threat toward humans. They are not aggressive towards people and usually flee when disturbed or disclosed from cover. Centipede stings are therefore rare, usually resulting only when the centipede is cornered or aggressively handled. Successful stings typically produce only mild, localized pain and swelling, similar to bee sting. Allergic reactions to centipede stings have been reported, but these are rare; nearly all successful bites resolve quickly and without complication.
