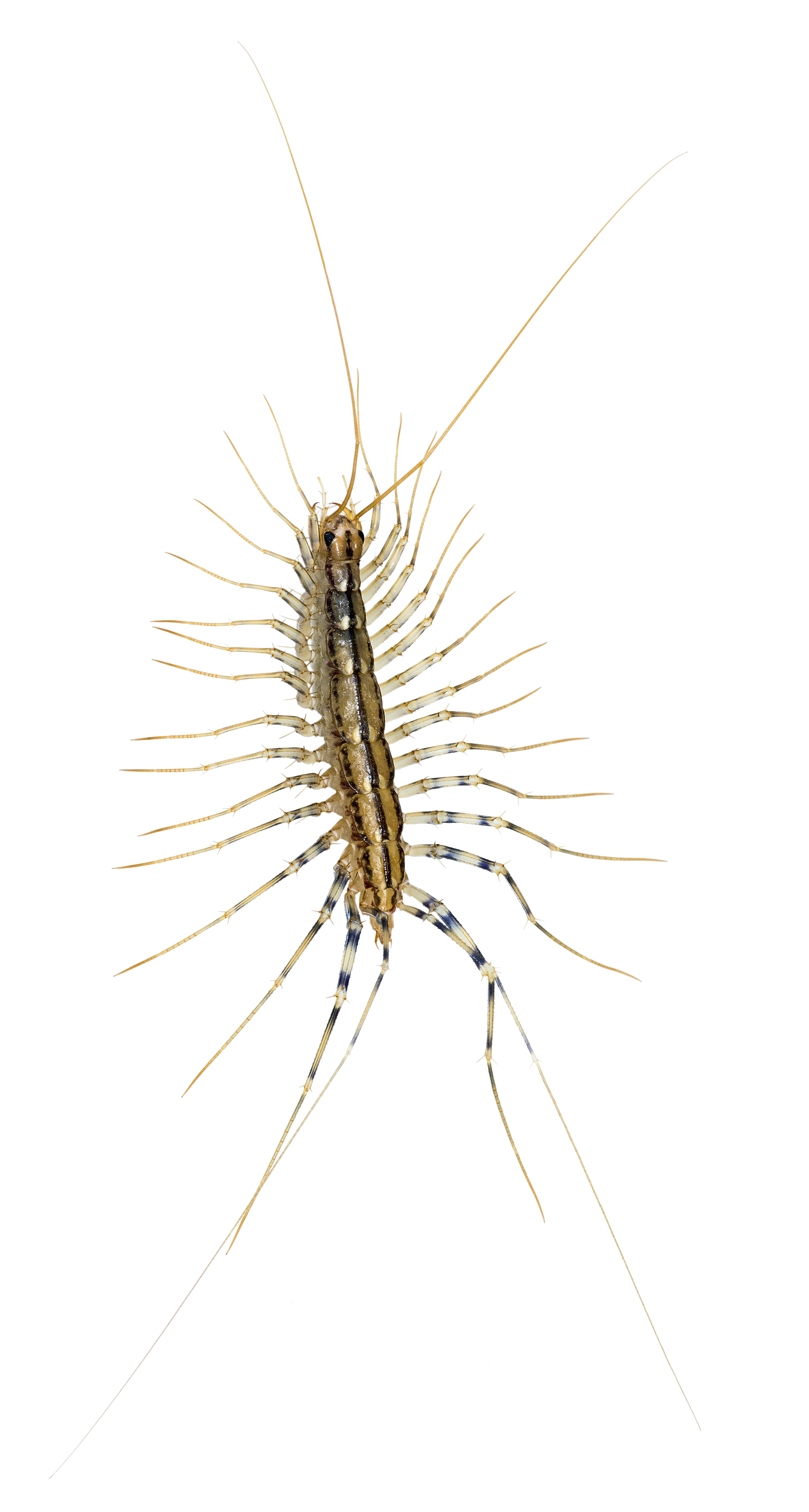
- Scutigera coleoptrata

Scientific classification
- Kingdom: Animalia
- Phylum: Arthropoda
- Subphylum: Myriapoda
- Class: Chilopoda
- Order: Scutigeromorpha
- Family: Scutigeridae; Leach, 1814

= Scutigeridae =

Scutigeridae Temporal range: 122.46–0 Ma Early Cretaceous to present

Family of centipedes

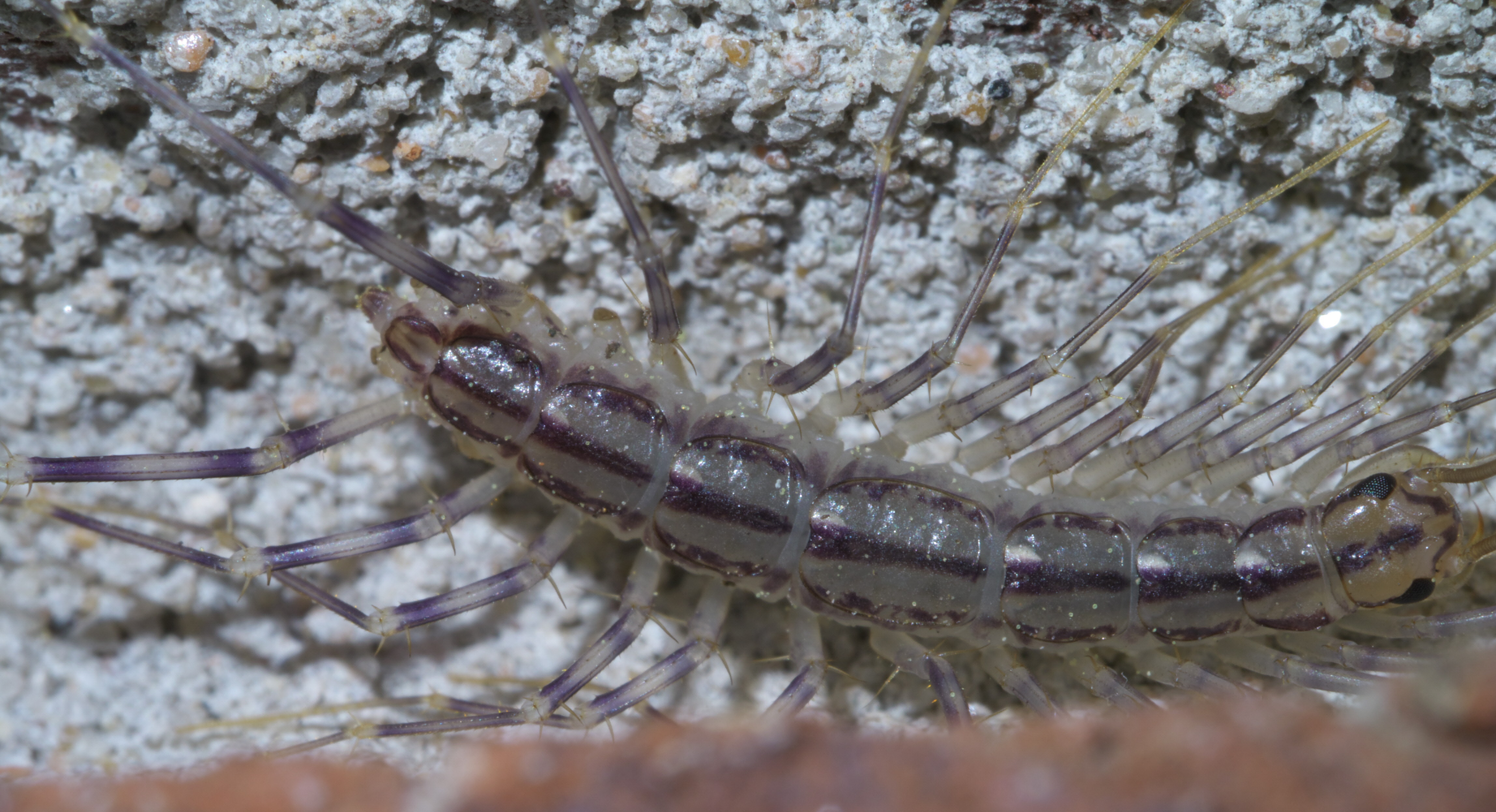
Scutigera coleoptrata

Scutigeridae is a family of centipedes that are known as house centipedes. It includes most species of house centipedes, including Scutigera coleoptrata and Allothereua maculata. House centipedes are so named because they are frequently found in and around human dwellings, especially in damp, dark or dimly lit areas such as basements, bathrooms and garages.

== Genera ==
These 25 genera belong to the family Scutigeridae:

- Allothereua Verhoeff, 1905^{i c g}
- Ballonema Verhoeff, 1904^{i c g}
- Ballonemella Verhoeff, 1944^{i c g}
- Brasiloscutigera Bücherl, 1939^{i c g}
- Dendrothereua Verhoeff, 1944^{i b}
- Diplacrophor Chamberlin, 1920^{i c g}
- Fulmenocursor Wilson, 2001^{g}
- Gomphor Chamberlin, 1944^{i c g}
- Parascutigera Verhoeff, 1904^{i c g}
- Pesvarus Würmli, 1974^{i c g}
- Phanothereua Chamberlin, 1958^{i c g}
- Pilbarascutigera Edgecombe and Barrow, 2007^{i}
- Podothereua Verhoeff, 1905^{i c g}
- Prionopodella Verhoeff, 1925^{i c g}
- Prothereua Verhoeff, 1925^{i c g}
- Scutigera Lamarck, 1801^{i c g b}
- Seychellonema Butler, Edgecombe, Ball and Giribet, 2011^{i g}
- Tachythereua Verhoeff, 1905^{i c g}
- Thereulla Chamberlin, 1955^{i c g}
- Thereuonema Verhoeff, 1904^{i c g}
- Thereuopoda Verhoeff, 1904^{i c g}
- Thereuopodina Verhoeff, 1905^{i c g}
- Thereuoquima Bücherl, 1949^{i c g}

Data sources: i = ITIS, c = Catalogue of Life, g = GBIF, b = Bugguide.net

The earliest known member of this family is †Fulmenocursor, an extinct genus from the Early Cretaceous of the Crato Formation of Brazil.
