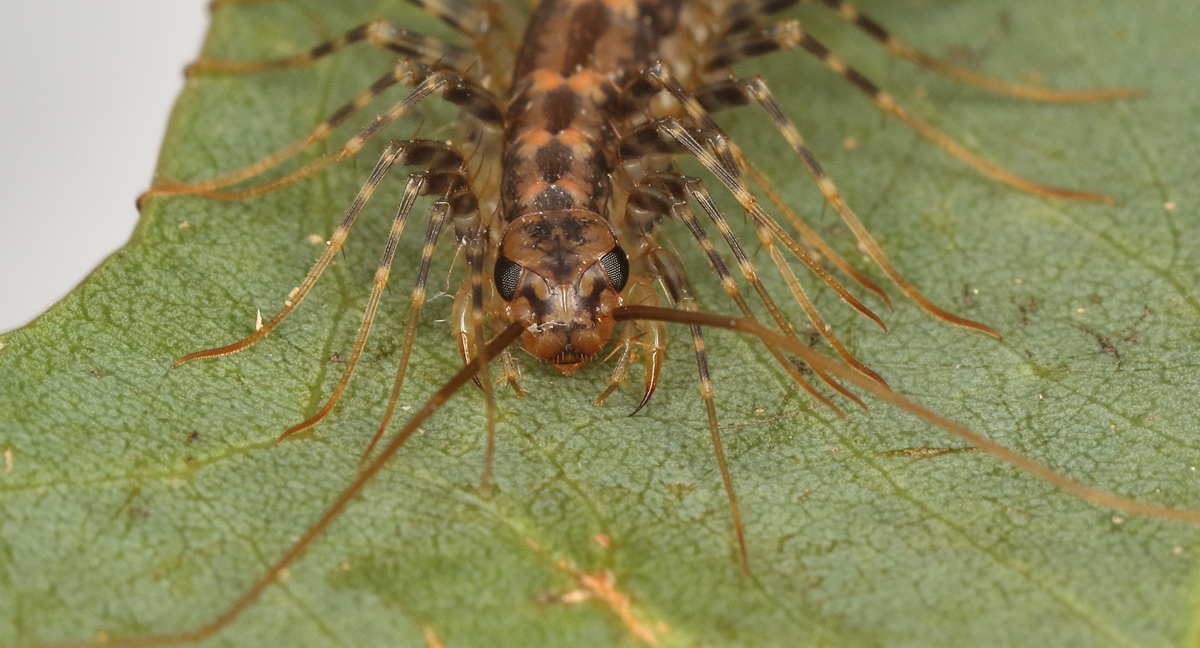
- Close-up of a common scutigeromorph

Scientific classification
- Kingdom: Animalia
- Phylum: Arthropoda
- Subphylum: Myriapoda
- Class: Chilopoda
- Subclass: Notostigmophora; Verhoeff, 1901
- Order: Scutigeromorpha; Pocock, 1895

Families
- †Crussolidae; †Latzeliidae; Pselliodidae; Scutigeridae; Scutigerinidae

= Scutigeromorpha =

Scutigeromorpha Temporal range: 425–0 Ma Silurian-Present

Order of centipedes

Scutigeromorpha is an order of centipedes also known as house centipedes. These centipedes are found in the temperate and tropical parts of every continent except Antarctica, with their distribution significantly expanded by the introduction of the Mediterranean species Scutigera coleoptrata throughout Europe, Asia, and North America. The common species S. coleoptrata is a typical representative of this order, lying in wait for other arthropods, then seizing prey using great speed, and all species in this order reflect adaptations for this mode of life.

== Description ==
House centipedes are hemianamorphic, and adults in this order have 15 leg-bearing segments. Adults have bodies that measure 2 to 3.5 cm in length, but some can reach 8 cm in body length. Species in this order can be readily recognized by their long legs and antennae. The antennae end in annulated flagella that are each divided into two or three segments. The ultimate legs are much longer than the others and resemble the antennae. These centipedes also feature compound eyes, which are divided into ommatidia with crystalline cones.

The trunk of these centipedes features eight tergites: The first trunk segment corresponds to a short first tergite, then seven large tergites follow. The first large tergite covers the second trunk segment, but the second covers segments 3 and 4, the third covers segments 5 and 6, the fourth covers segments 7, 8, and 9, and the remaining three each cover two segments per tergite.

An especially striking feature that distinguishes this order from all other centipedes is the arrangement of spiracles. In this order, spiracles are arranged in a series down the middle of the centipede's back, whereas spiracles in all other centipedes are on the sides of their bodies. This distinction places this order in its own subclass, Notostigmophora, whereas all other centipedes are placed in the subclass Pleurostigmophora. Centipedes in this order have a single spiracle opening through a slit at the posterior of each of the seven large tergites. The dorsal placement of spiracles reflects the adaptation of species in this order to life in the open rather than under stones or bark, where other centipedes live.

== Fossil record ==
The earliest known fossil centipedes have been identified as belonging to the order Scutigeromorpha based on the morphology of their legs and their maxillipeds. These Paleozoic fossils date the crown group of Chilopoda to at least the late Silurian, 418 million years ago. These fossils place scutigeromorphs among the earliest terrestrial arthropods. These older fossils differ enough from extant species to be assigned to the scutigeromorph stem group, but younger fossils may be similar enough to extant species to date the crown group of Scutigeromorpha to at least the Early Cretaceous.

== Families ==
There are 88 species and 27 genera of Scutigeromorph centipedes distributed among three families: Pselliodidae, Scutigeridae, and Scutigerinidae. Most scutigeromorph species belong to the largest family, Scutigeridae, with a cosmopolitan distribution. The family Scutigeridae includes two subfamilies: Scutigerinae and Thereuoneminae. The small family Pselliodidae contains several species and includes the genus Sphendononema, found in the Neotropics and tropical Africa. The smallest family, Scutigerinidae, contains only a few species and includes the genera Scutigerina and Madagassophora, found in South Africa and Madagascar.
