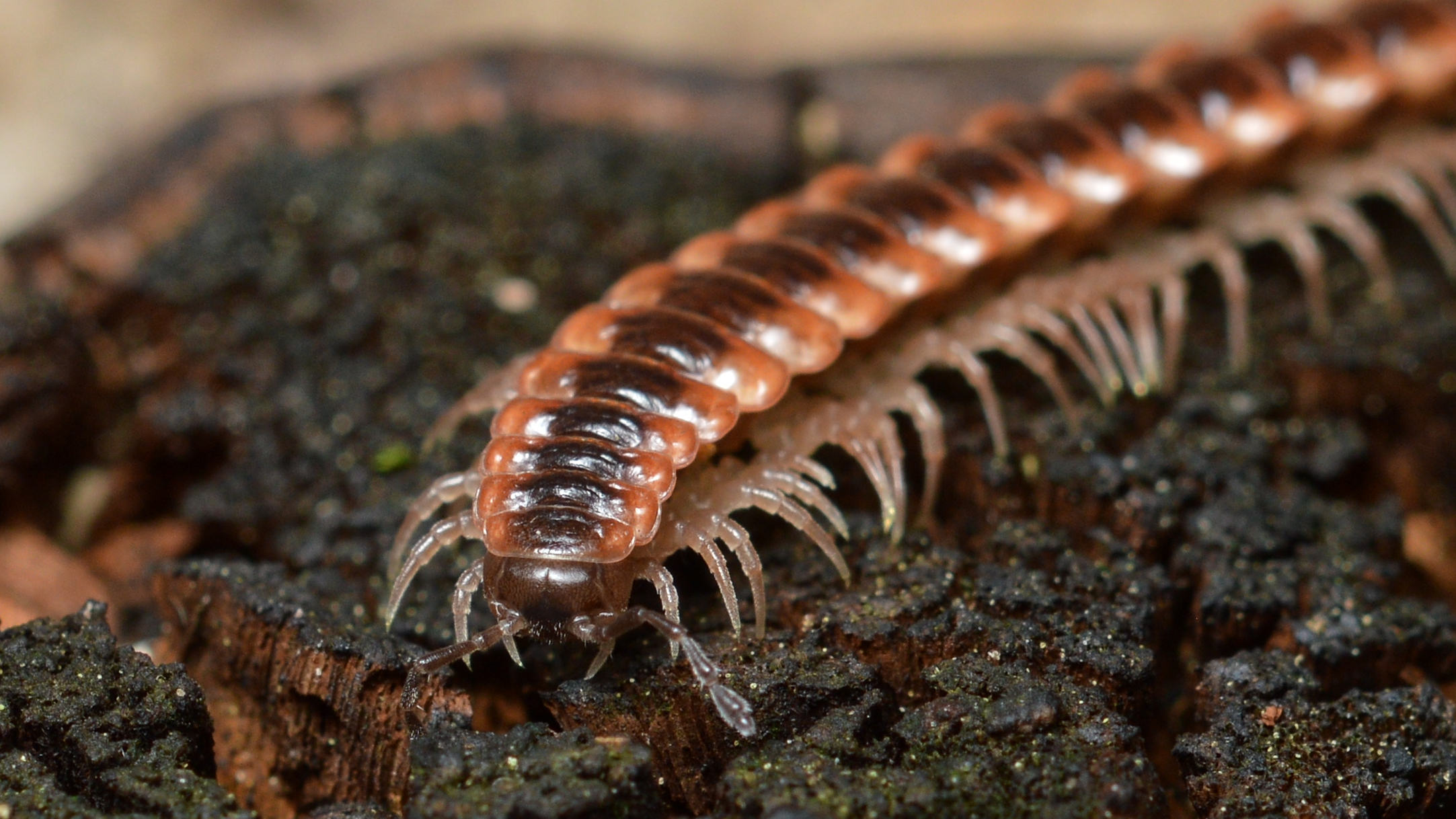

Scientific classification
- Kingdom: Animalia
- Phylum: Arthropoda
- Subphylum: Myriapoda
- Class: Diplopoda
- Order: Polydesmida
- Family: Polydesmidae
- Genus: Pseudopolydesmus
- Species: P. canadensis

Binomial name
- Pseudopolydesmus canadensis (Newport, 1814)

= Pseudopolydesmus canadensis =

Species of millipede

Pseudopolydesmus canadensis, also known as Canadian flat-backed millipede, is a species of flat-backed millipede in the family Polydesmidae. It is found in North America and Europe.

It can be distinguished from Pseudopolydesmus serratus by the black mid-dorsal stripe.
