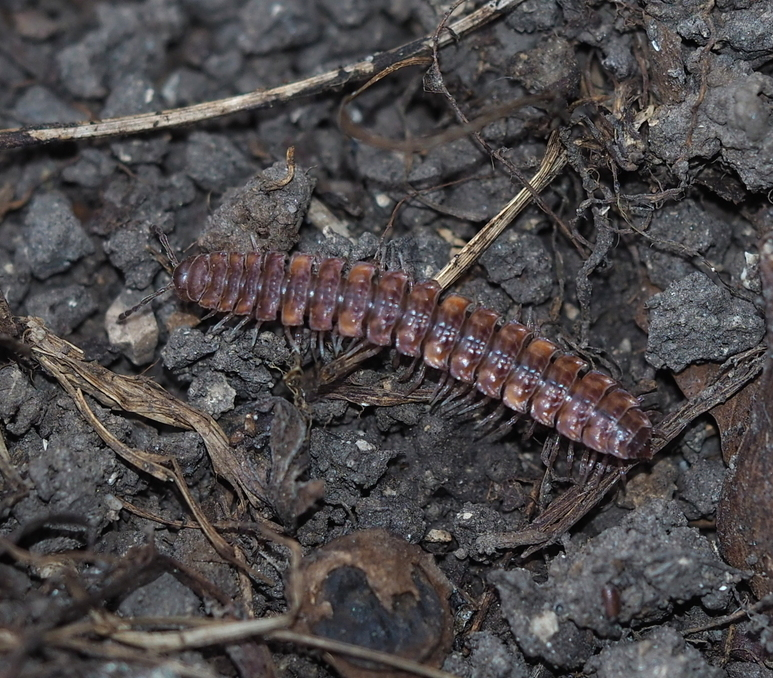

Scientific classification
- Kingdom: Animalia
- Phylum: Arthropoda
- Subphylum: Myriapoda
- Class: Diplopoda
- Order: Polydesmida
- Family: Polydesmidae
- Genus: Polydesmus
- Species: P. complanatus

Binomial name
- Polydesmus complanatus (Linnaeus, 1761)

Synonyms
- Julus complanatus Linnaeus, 1761

= Polydesmus complanatus =

Species of millipede

Polydesmus complanatus is species of millipede in the family Polydesmidae. The species can be found in most of Europe except for countries west of Germany.

There are currently 11 subspecies:

- Polydesmus complanatus calaber Strasser, 1969
- Polydesmus complanatus complanatus (Linnaeus, 1761)
- Polydesmus complanatus constrictus Latzel, 1884
- Polydesmus complanatus costrictus Latzel, 1884
- Polydesmus complanatus illyricus Verhoeff, 1898
- Polydesmus complanatus intermedius (Attems)
- Polydesmus complanatus montanus Daday, 1889
- Polydesmus complanatus salicis Verhoeff
- Polydesmus complanatus savonensis Verhoeff, 1907
- Polydesmus complanatus szinnensis (Attems)

The subspecies Polydesmus complanatus angustus is now accepted as Polydesmus angustus, Polydesmus complanatus elevatus is now a synonym of Polydesmus angustus.
