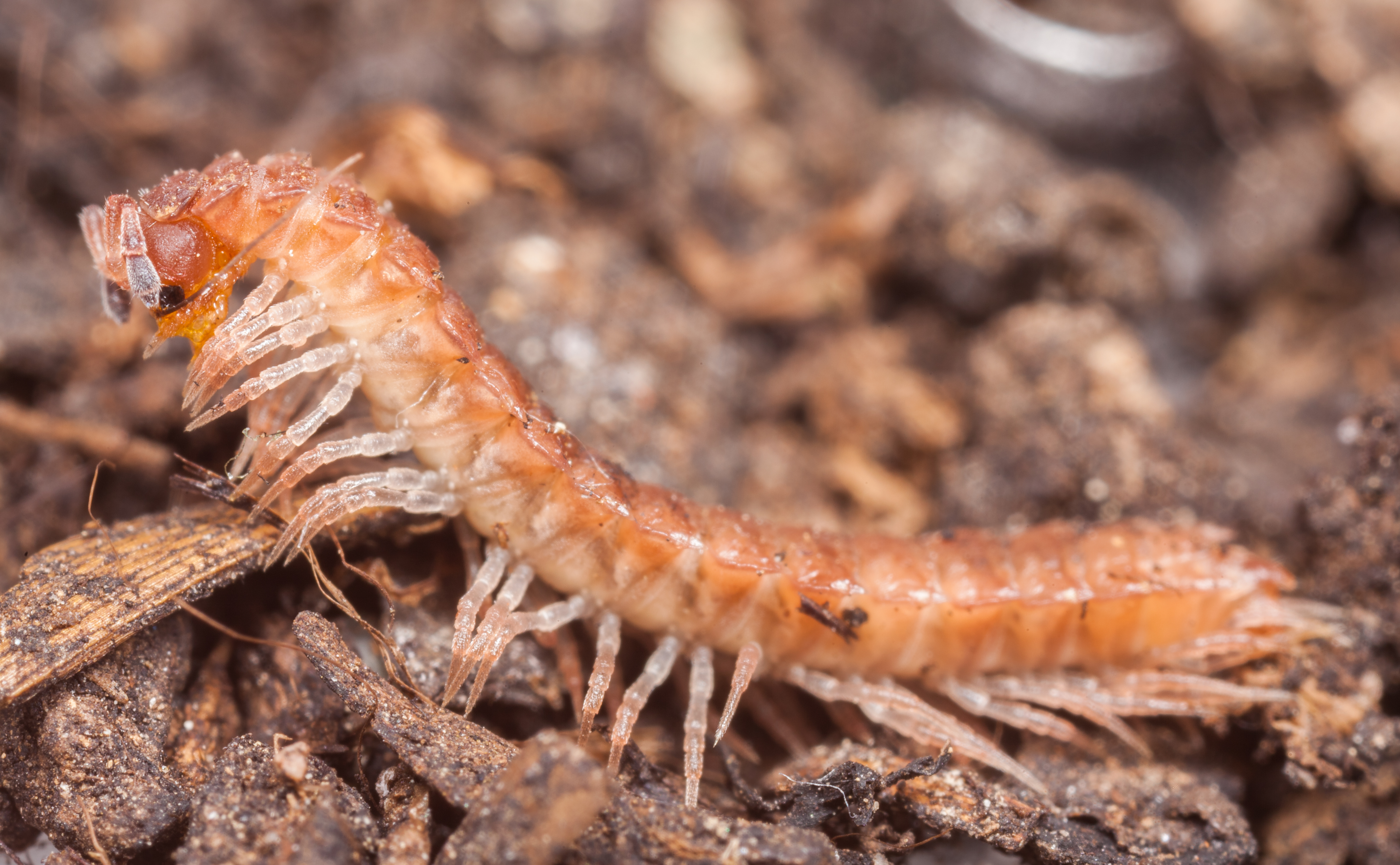

Scientific classification
- Kingdom: Animalia
- Phylum: Arthropoda
- Subphylum: Myriapoda
- Class: Diplopoda
- Order: Polydesmida
- Family: Polydesmidae
- Genus: Brachydesmus
- Species: B. superus

Binomial name
- Brachydesmus superus Latzel, 1884

Synonyms
- Brachydesmus dux Chamberlin, 1940; Brachydesmus gladiolus Williams & Hefner, 1928; Brachydesmus insculptus Pocock, 1892; Brachydesmus mosellanus Verhoeff, 1891; Brachydesmus pallidus Loomis, 1939; Brachydesmus peninsulae Attems, 1899; Brachydesmus superus superus Latzel, 1884; Eubrachydesmus superus (Latzel, 1884); Polydesmus pilidens Koch, 1847; Polydesmus superus (Latzel, 1884)

= Brachydesmus superus =

Species of millipede

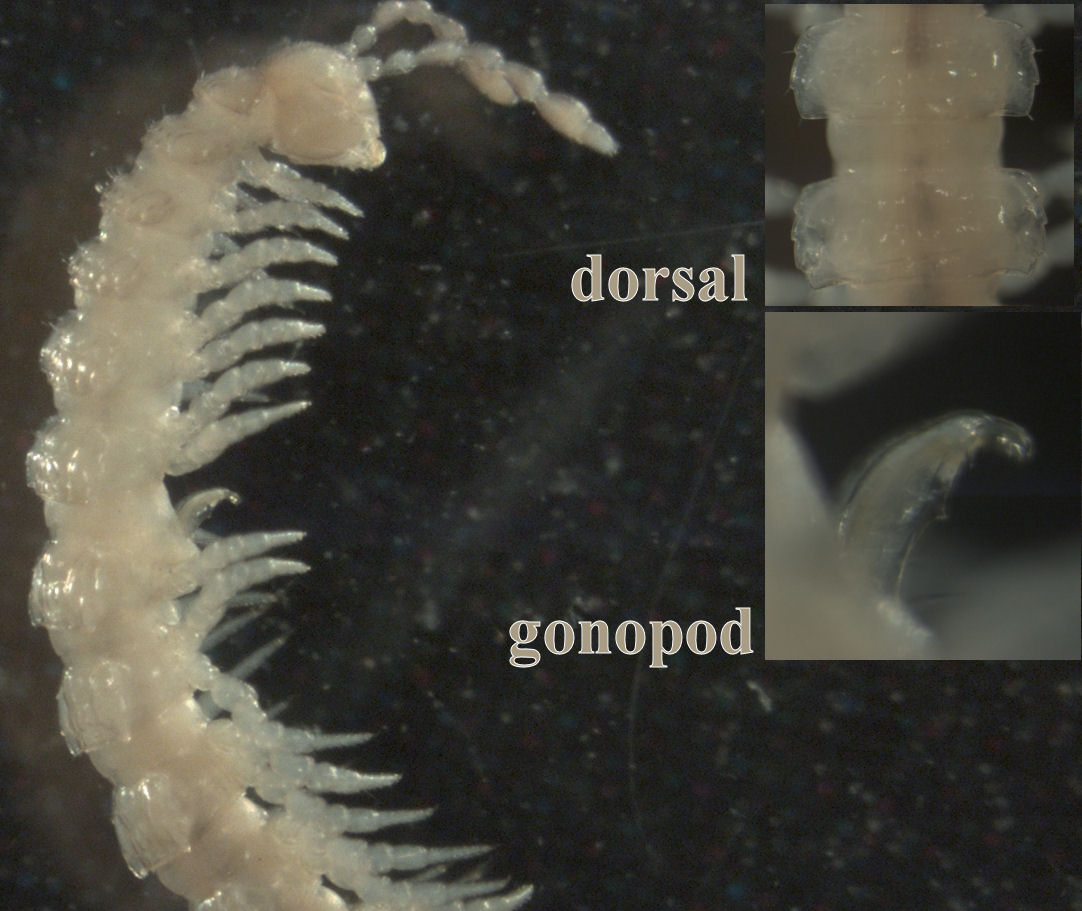
Image of a B. superus millipede, with view of dorsum and gonopod.

Brachydesmus superus, also known as the flat millipede, is a species of millipede in the family Polydesmidae. This millipede is common throughout Europe and has been spread widely elsewhere by humans through commerce. This species can reach 10 mm in length and features only 19 segments in adults (counting the collum, the telson, and the rings in between), one fewer than found in adults of most other species in the order Polydesmida.

== Discovery ==
This species was first described in 1884 by the Austrian myriapodologist Robert Latzel. He based the original description of this species on more than 60 specimens, including juveniles as well as mature adults of both sexes. Most of these specimens were found near Vienna in Austria, but others were found in Moravia and western Hungary.

== Distribution ==
This millipede has been recorded across most of Europe and introduced to the northeastern United States, Canada, Cape Verde, Madeira, the Azores, and the Canaries. This species is common in the British Isles, where it is one of the most frequently recorded species of millipede. In North America, this millipede is found from Michigan and Ontario to North Carolina. This species has reached as far as the Juan Fernández Islands in the Pacific Ocean.

== Habitats ==
This millipede lives in a wide range of habitats. This species is found in moist leaf litter and the upper layers of soil in gardens and woods. In Ireland, for example, these millipedes can be found in damp bramble and willow litter beneath hedgerows and at the interface between litter and humus in deciduous woods. In the British Isles, these millipedes are also found in damp clay-loam areas in caves and in mole nests.

This millipede is sometimes found in grassland and arable fields. This millipede is often found among roots and in potato tubers, where they are suspected of aggravating injury to crops already damaged by other factors. This species is common in sugar beet fields, where it is considered a pest and sometimes thought to be the primary cause of costly damage.

== Description ==
This species ranges from nearly white to light brown, with the appearance of the live millipede turning in part on the intestinal contents visible through the transparent cuticle. This millipede can range from 6.5 mm to 10 mm in length, and the middle of the body can range from 0.8 mm to 1.2 mm in width. Adults of this species have 19 segments (counting the collum as the first and the telson as the last), unlike adults in most other species in the family Polydesmidae, which usually have 20 segments. Accordingly, adults of this species have two fewer leg pairs than most polydesmid adults have: Females have only 29 pairs of legs, and males have only 28 pairs of walking legs, excluding the eighth leg pair, which become a pair of gonopods.

The gonopods of the adult male lie close to the ventral surface between the preceding leg pair. Each gonopod is slender, slightly curved, and tapered toward the distal end, with several teeth or spines on the concave side and a prominent hairy tubercle near the distal end. The male also features walking legs that are thicker than the legs of the female. The adult female features epigynal flanges, a pair of raised ridges along the anterior margin of the ventral surface of the third segment.

The head is broader than the collum but not broader than segment 2, with subsequent segments growing wider until segment 5. After segment 15 or 16, the posterior segments taper toward the telson. The posterior corners of the paranota are obtuse angles on anterior segments until segment 6, where they become pointed, growing increasingly acute and extending behind the posterior tergal margin starting with segment 11 or 12. The surface is especially shiny. The tergal setae are relatively long, and most feature sharp points.

== Development and life cycle ==
This millipede is evidently an annual species, reaching maturity in the spring and dying after mating and laying eggs. In the British Isles, for example, adults are abundant from March to June but scarce in August and September. The female of this species usually lays about 50 eggs in the spring or summer in an elaborate dome-shaped nest and then dies, only rarely making a second nest.

Within a month to six weeks, the juvenile hatches in the first stage of development with only seven segments and three pairs of legs. This species arrives at lower numbers of segments and legs in adults than most other polydesmids by going through the first seven stages of teloanamorphosis usually observed in other polydesmids but reaching maturity one molt earlier, in the seventh stage rather than in an eighth stage, and then mating and dying without another molt. This species takes five to nine months to reach maturity. In Wales, for example, the first instars appear by July, with most reaching the third stage by late autumn, then apparently developing during the winter, reaching the fifth and sixth stages by the following spring.
