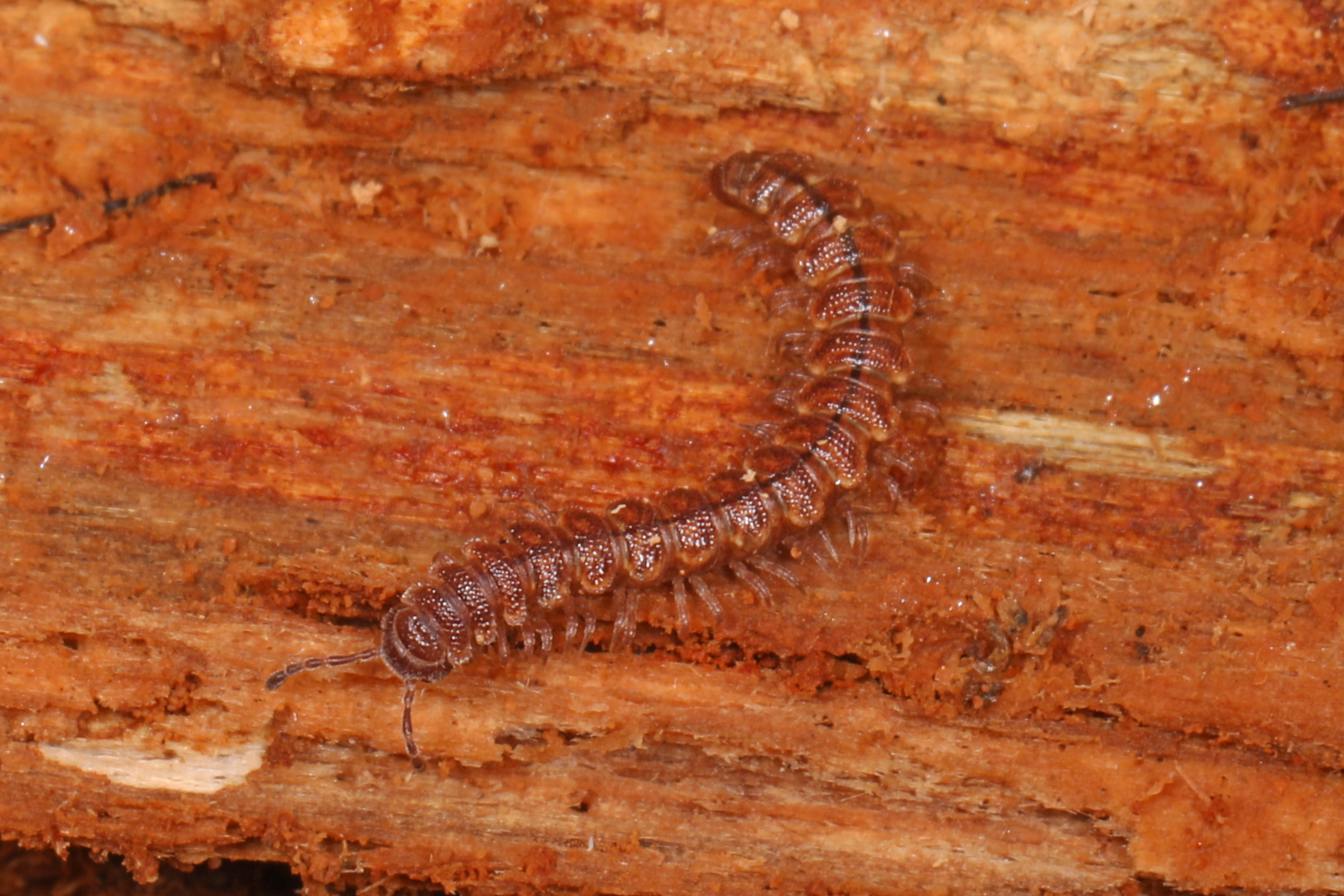

Scientific classification
- Kingdom: Animalia
- Phylum: Arthropoda
- Subphylum: Myriapoda
- Class: Diplopoda
- Order: Polydesmida
- Family: Polydesmidae
- Genus: Scytonotus
- Species: S. granulatus

Binomial name
- Scytonotus granulatus (Say, 1821)

= Scytonotus granulatus =

Species of millipede

Scytonotus granulatus, the granulated millipede, is a species of flat-backed millipede in the family Polydesmidae. It is found in North America.
