= Anoplodesmus luctuosus =

Scientific classification
- Kingdom: Animalia
- Phylum: Arthropoda
- Subphylum: Myriapoda
- Class: Diplopoda
- Order: Polydesmida
- Family: Paradoxosomatidae
- Genus: Anoplodesmus
- Species: A. luctuosus

Binomial name
- Anoplodesmus luctuosus (Peters, 1864)

Species of millipede

Anoplodesmus luctuosus (sometimes as Polydesmus luctuosus) is a species of millipedes in the family Paradoxosomatidae. It is endemic to Sri Lanka, which was first documented from Ramboda. The species sometimes placed in the genus Polydesmus of the family Polydesmidae.
