= Pseudopolydesmus paludicolus =

Scientific classification
- Kingdom: Animalia
- Phylum: Arthropoda
- Subphylum: Myriapoda
- Class: Diplopoda
- Order: Polydesmida
- Family: Polydesmidae
- Genus: Pseudopolydesmus
- Species: P. paludicolus

Binomial name
- Pseudopolydesmus paludicolus Hoffman, 1950

Species of millipede

Pseudopolydesmus paludicolus is a species of flat-backed millipede in the family Polydesmidae. It is found in North America.
