= Polydesmus skinneri =

Scientific classification
- Kingdom: Animalia
- Phylum: Arthropoda
- Subphylum: Myriapoda
- Class: Diplopoda
- Order: Polydesmida
- Family: Polydesmidae
- Genus: Polydesmus
- Species: P. skinneri

Binomial name
- Polydesmus skinneri Humbert, 1865

Synonyms
- Singhalorthomorpha skinneri (Humbert, 1865); Strongylosoma skinneri (Humbert, 1865)

Species of millipede

Polydesmus skinneri is a species of millipedes in the family Polydesmidae. It is endemic to Sri Lanka.
