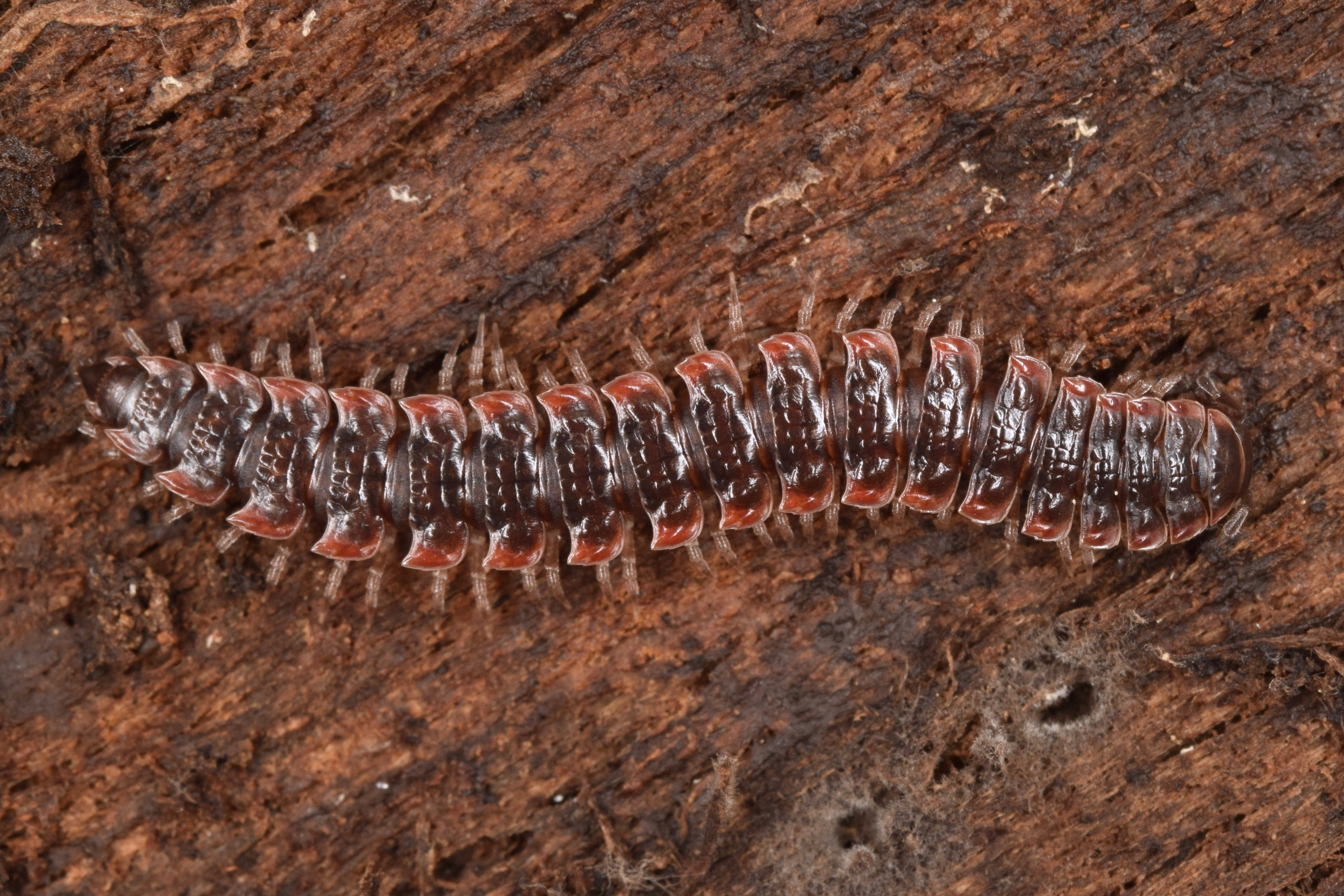

Scientific classification
- Kingdom: Animalia
- Phylum: Arthropoda
- Subphylum: Myriapoda
- Class: Diplopoda
- Order: Polydesmida
- Family: Polydesmidae
- Genus: Pseudopolydesmus
- Species: P. erasus

Binomial name
- Pseudopolydesmus erasus (Loomis, 1943)

= Pseudopolydesmus erasus =

Species of millipede

Pseudopolydesmus erasus is a species of flat-backed millipedes in the family Polydesmidae. It is found in North America.
