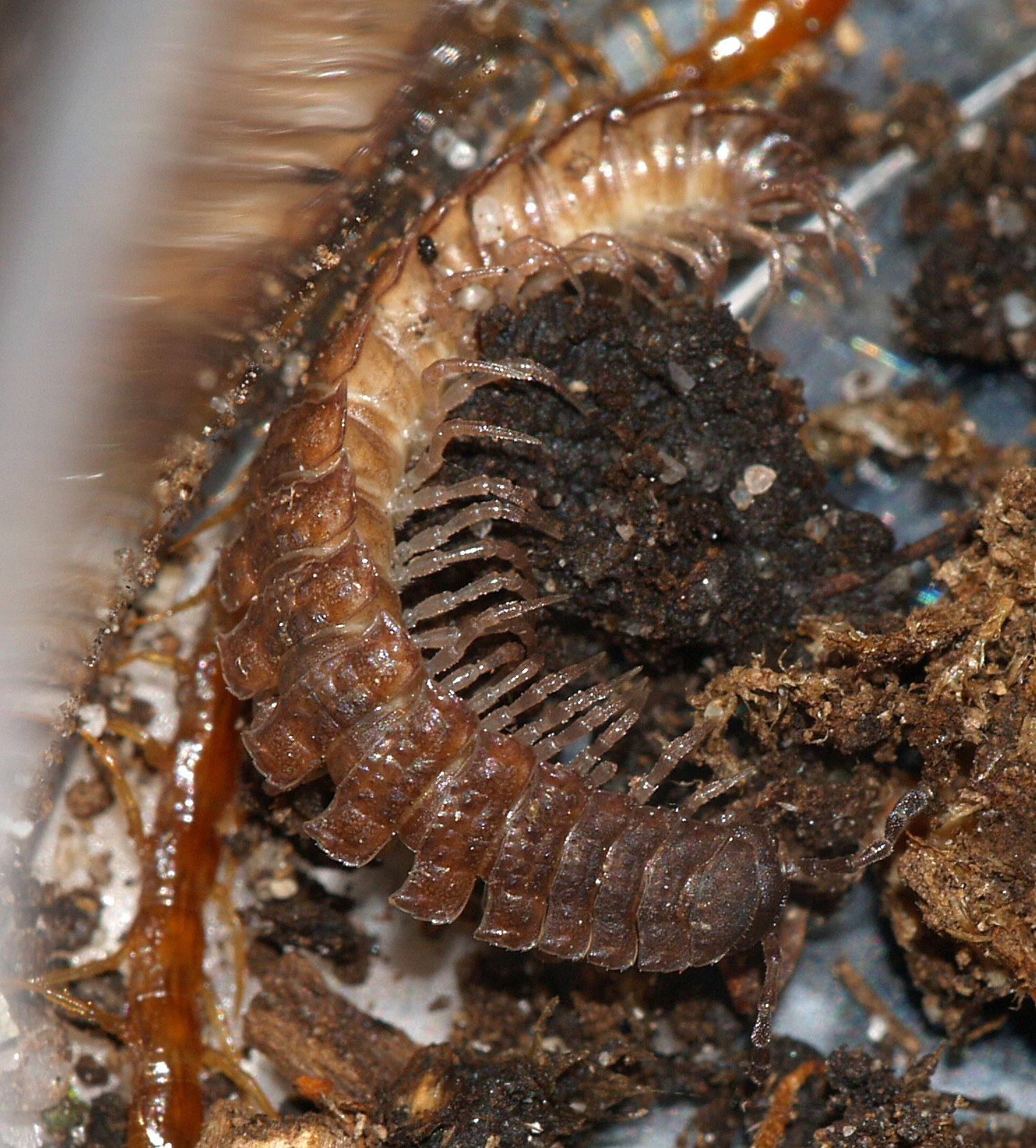

Scientific classification
- Kingdom: Animalia
- Phylum: Arthropoda
- Subphylum: Myriapoda
- Class: Diplopoda
- Order: Polydesmida
- Family: Polydesmidae
- Genus: Polydesmus
- Species: P. angustus

Binomial name
- Polydesmus angustus Latzel, 1884

= Polydesmus angustus =

Species of millipede

Polydesmus angustus, also known as the flat-backed millipede, is a millipede in the genus Polydesmus native to Western Europe.

== Description ==
The flat-backed millipede can be a rather small species of millipede, while typically reaching 24 millimetres (0.94 in), in captivity there have been individuals that reached sizes of up to 50 millimetres (2.0 in) or as small as 18 millimetres (0.71 in), this grand variety has been attributed to the quality of nutrition and humidity. As the name points out, Polydesmus angustus is a rather flat millipede, with all 20 segments' chitin extending laterally, an adaptation for digging and camouflaging in leaf litter. They are quite similar to other species in their same genus, P. coriaceus, P. denticulatus and P. inconstans, only being reliably identified by the shape of a male's gonopods or female epigyne.

== Range and habitat ==
Polydesmus angustus is most commonly found in Western Europe, including the British Isles; with some sightings in the East and West of the United States and southern Canada; likely in an invasive capacity.

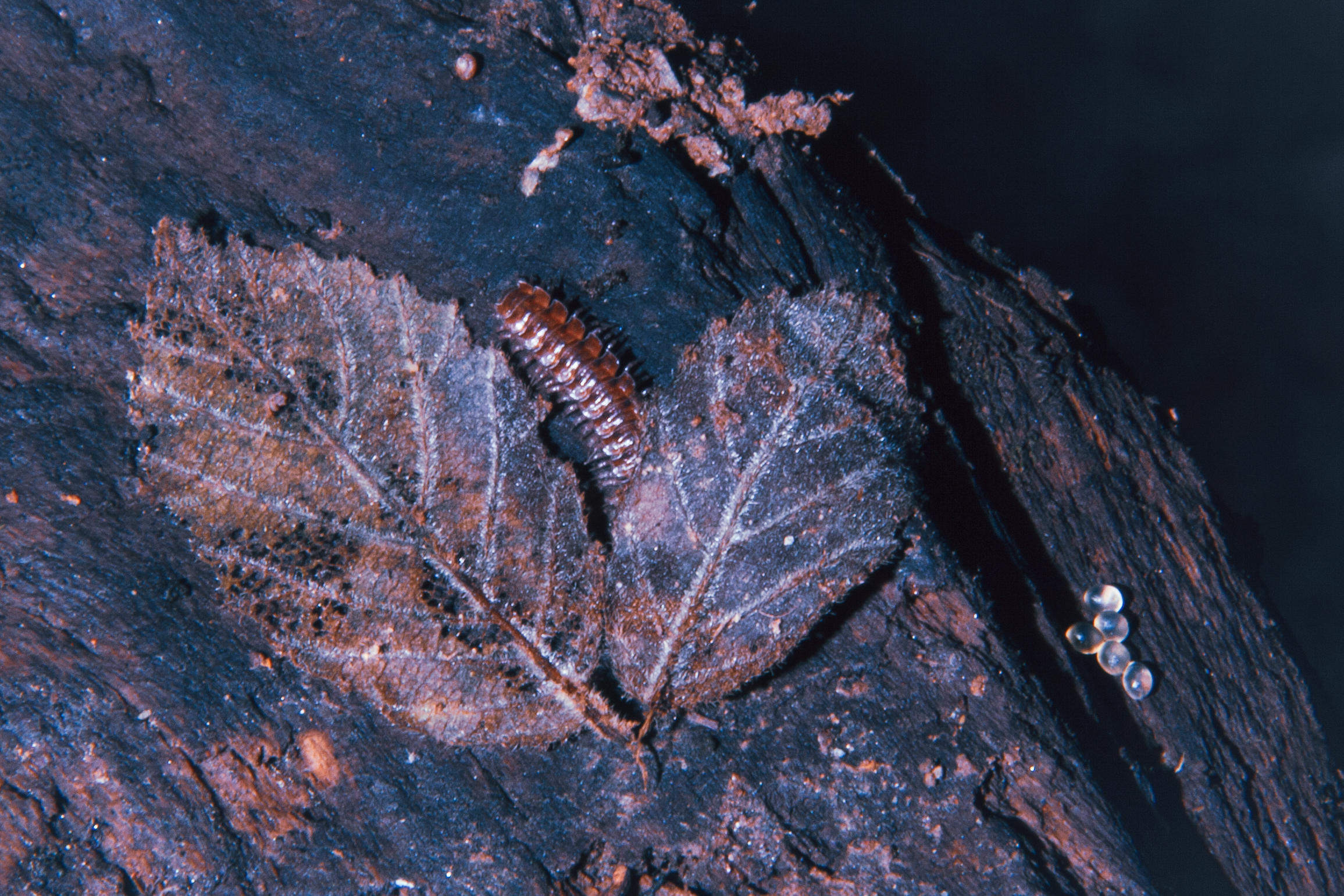
Polydesmus angustus

It's often been believed that the flat-headed millipede prefers a woodland habitat, seen as they can be found in their leaf litter; more recent analysis suggest the species' true preference of heath and moorland environments, due to its tendency towards peat soils and dislike of soils with over 45% clay.
