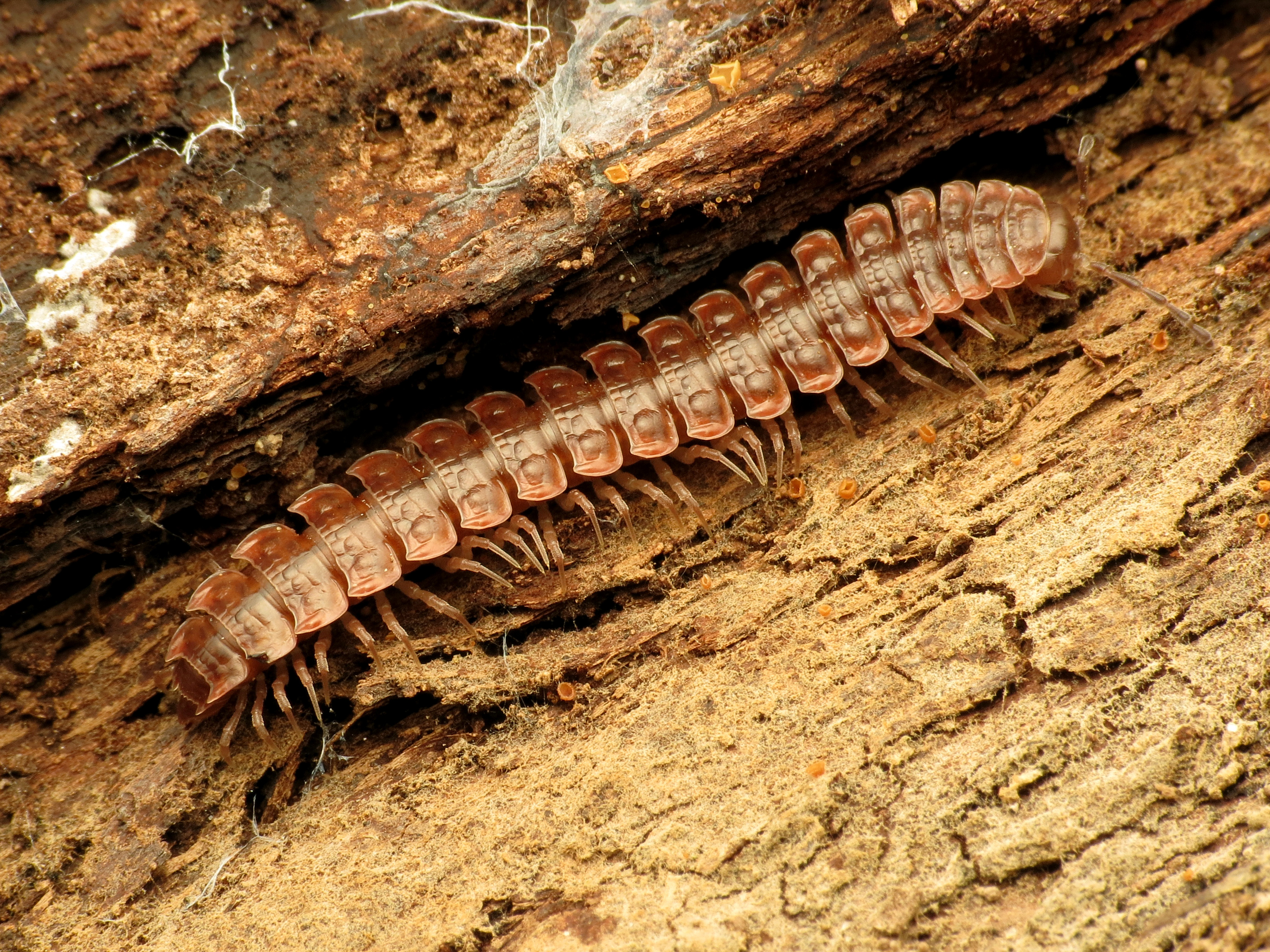

Scientific classification
- Kingdom: Animalia
- Phylum: Arthropoda
- Subphylum: Myriapoda
- Class: Diplopoda
- Order: Polydesmida
- Family: Polydesmidae
- Genus: Pseudopolydesmus
- Species: P. serratus

Binomial name
- Pseudopolydesmus serratus (Say, 1821)

= Pseudopolydesmus serratus =

Species of millipede

Pseudopolydesmus serratus is a species of flat-backed millipede in the family Polydesmidae. It is found in North America.
