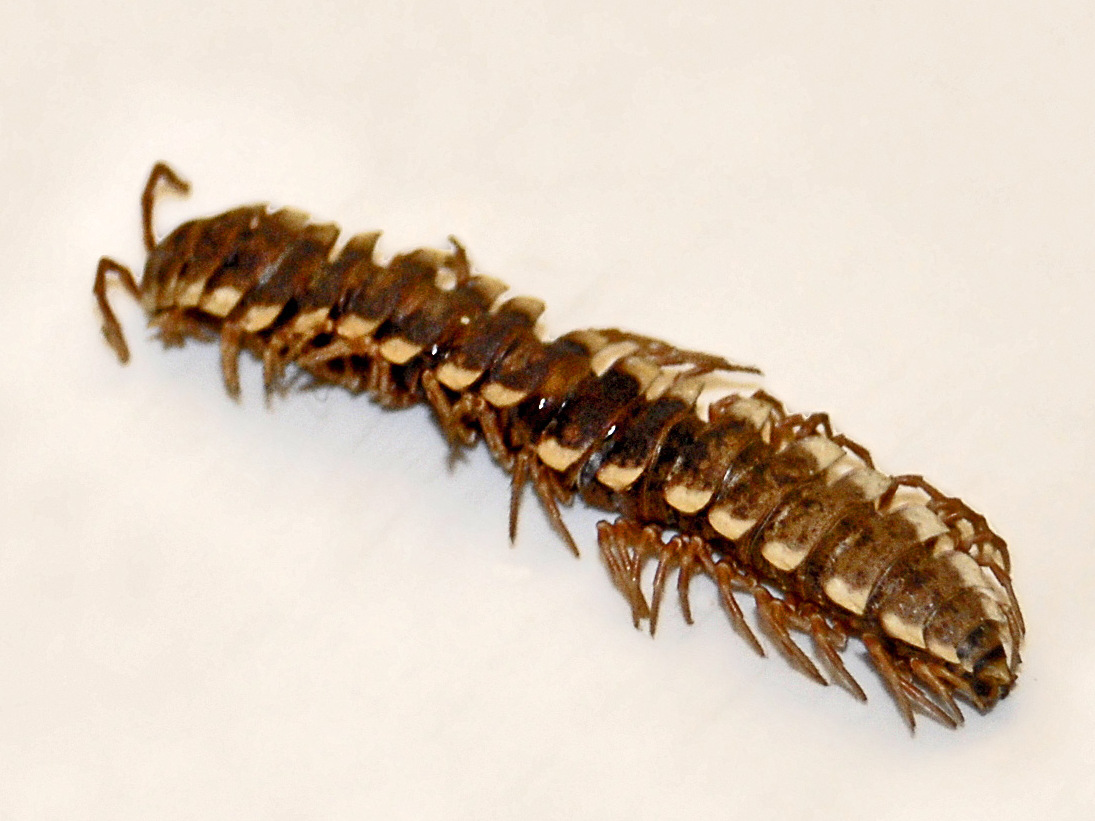
- Polydesmus species. Museum specimen

Scientific classification
- Kingdom: Animalia
- Phylum: Arthropoda
- Subphylum: Myriapoda
- Class: Diplopoda
- Order: Polydesmida
- Family: Polydesmidae
- Genus: Polydesmus; Latreille, 1802

= Polydesmus =

Genus of millipedes

Polydesmus is a genus of millipedes in the family Polydesmidae. With more than 200 species and subspecies, this genus is the largest in this family. This genus has a Palearctic distribution, with species found mainly in the Mediterranean region and in Europe west of the central Caucasus. This genus includes the notable species Polydesmus progressus, which exhibits sexual dimorphism in segment number: Whereas adult females of this species feature the 20 segments (counting the collum as the first segment and the telson as the last) usually observed on the order Polydesmida, the adult males feature only 19 segments.

== Species ==
Species within this genus include:

- Polydesmus abchasius
- Polydesmus abstrusus
- Polydesmus aegyptiacus
- Polydesmus alatus
- Polydesmus albocarinatus
- Polydesmus almassyi
- Polydesmus alternatus
- Polydesmus alutaceus
- Polydesmus angustus
- Polydesmus annectens
- Polydesmus arcticollis
- Polydesmus areatus
- Polydesmus armatus
- Polydesmus astenestatus
- Polydesmus asthenestatus
- Polydesmus ater
- Polydesmus barberii
- Polydesmus bataviae
- Polydesmus beaumontii
- Polydesmus beroni
- Polydesmus bogotensis
- Polydesmus bonikus
- Polydesmus brachydesmoides
- Polydesmus brevimanus
- Polydesmus bureschi
- Polydesmus caesius
- Polydesmus callipus
- Polydesmus capensis
- Polydesmus carneus
- Polydesmus cavernarum
- Polydesmus cerrrutti
- Polydesmus cerrutii
- Polydesmus chloropus
- Polydesmus clarazianus
- Polydesmus clavator
- Polydesmus claviger
- Polydesmus coarctatus
- Polydesmus codicillus
- Polydesmus cognatus
- Polydesmus collaris
- Polydesmus complananatus
- Polydesmus complanatus
- Polydesmus concolor
- Polydesmus concordiae
- Polydesmus conspersus
- Polydesmus coriaceus
- Polydesmus costobocensis
- Polydesmus crassicutis
- Polydesmus cruciator
- Polydesmus csikii
- Polydesmus cyprius
- Polydesmus dadayanus
- Polydesmus dadayi
- Polydesmus dealbatus
- Polydesmus decolor
- Polydesmus decoratus
- Polydesmus dentatus
- Polydesmus denticulatus
- Polydesmus dilatatus
- Polydesmus dorsalis
- Polydesmus dumitrescui
- Polydesmus edentulus
- Polydesmus effulgens
- Polydesmus ehrenbergii
- Polydesmus elchowensis
- Polydesmus elegans
- Polydesmus elochwensis
- Polydesmus emirganensis
- Polydesmus ensiger
- Polydesmus erichsoni
- Polydesmus escherichi
- Polydesmus escherichii
- Polydesmus falcifer
- Polydesmus fallax
- Polydesmus fischeri
- Polydesmus fissilobus
- Polydesmus flavomarginatus
- Polydesmus fontium
- Polydesmus fontius
- Polydesmus fraterus
- Polydesmus frauenfeldianus
- Polydesmus frondivagus
- Polydesmus fumigatus
- Polydesmus funiculus
- Polydesmus fuscus
- Polydesmus gabonicus
- Polydesmus gallicus
- Polydesmus gayanus
- Polydesmus genuensis
- Polydesmus geochromus
- Polydesmus geoffroyi
- Polydesmus germanicus
- Polydesmus glabrum
- Polydesmus goudoti
- Polydesmus gracilipes
- Polydesmus gradjensis
- Polydesmus graecus
- Polydesmus granosus
- Polydesmus granulosus
- Polydesmus grayii
- Polydesmus griseoalbus
- Polydesmus guerinii
- Polydesmus haastii
- Polydesmus hamatus
- Polydesmus haydenianus
- Polydesmus helveticus
- Polydesmus henselii
- Polydesmus herzegowinensis
- Polydesmus herzogowinensis
- Polydesmus hessei
- Polydesmus hochstetteri
- Polydesmus hochstetterii
- Polydesmus hoffmanni
- Polydesmus humberti
- Polydesmus hybridus
- Polydesmus idriensis
- Polydesmus ignoratus
- Polydesmus incisus
- Polydesmus inconstans
- Polydesmus incostans
- Polydesmus innotatum
- Polydesmus insularis
- Polydesmus ionicus
- Polydesmus jalzici
- Polydesmus japonicum
- Polydesmus japonicus
- Polydesmus javanus
- Polydesmus jawlowskii
- Polydesmus juergengruberi
- Polydesmus jugoslavicus
- Polydesmus kelaarti
- Polydesmus klisurensis
- Polydesmus komareki
- Polydesmus kosswigi
- Polydesmus lambranus
- Polydesmus liber
- Polydesmus liberiensis
- Polydesmus lignaui
- Polydesmus longicornis
- Polydesmus luctuosus
- Polydesmus lusitanicus
- Polydesmus lusitanus
- Polydesmus malaccanus
- Polydesmus mammillatus
- Polydesmus margaritaceus
- Polydesmus margaritiferus
- Polydesmus martensii
- Polydesmus mastophorus
- Polydesmus mediterraneus
- Polydesmus melanchthonius
- Polydesmus menicanus
- Polydesmus microcomplanatus
- Polydesmus minutulus
- Polydesmus miyosii
- Polydesmus moluccensis
- Polydesmus moniliaris
- Polydesmus montanus
- Polydesmus monticola
- Polydesmus morantus
- Polydesmus mucronatus
- Polydesmus muralewiczi
- Polydesmus nanus
- Polydesmus nattereri
- Polydesmus nietneri
- Polydesmus niveus
- Polydesmus nodosus
- Polydesmus noricus
- Polydesmus notatus
- Polydesmus ocellatus
- Polydesmus oltenicus
- Polydesmus oniscinus
- Polydesmus orientalis
- Polydesmus ornatus
- Polydesmus panteli
- Polydesmus parmatus
- Polydesmus pectinatus
- Polydesmus pekuensis
- Polydesmus pellicensis
- Polydesmus peloponnesi
- Polydesmus pfeifferae
- Polydesmus phantasma
- Polydesmus picteti
- Polydesmus pictus
- Polydesmus pilipes
- Polydesmus planinensis
- Polydesmus planus
- Polydesmus plataleus
- Polydesmus polonicus
- Polydesmus polygamiae
- Polydesmus progressus
- Polydesmus pseudoedentulus
- Polydesmus pulcher
- Polydesmus punctatus
- Polydesmus python
- Polydesmus raffardi
- Polydesmus rangifer
- Polydesmus rhodopensis
- Polydesmus ribeiraensis
- Polydesmus robiniarum
- Polydesmus rodopensis
- Polydesmus rothi
- Polydesmus roulini
- Polydesmus rubelus
- Polydesmus rubescens
- Polydesmus rupicursor
- Polydesmus sagittarius
- Polydesmus sakalava
- Polydesmus sanctus
- Polydesmus saussurii
- Polydesmus scaber
- Polydesmus schaessburgensis
- Polydesmus schetelyi
- Polydesmus schomburgkii
- Polydesmus sculptus
- Polydesmus scutatus
- Polydesmus semicinctus
- Polydesmus serridens
- Polydesmus skinneri
- Polydesmus spectabilis
- Polydesmus squammatus
- Polydesmus stiphropus
- Polydesmus striganovae
- Polydesmus strongylosomoides
- Polydesmus stummeri
- Polydesmus stuxbergi
- Polydesmus subscabratus
- Polydesmus subulifer
- Polydesmus subvittatus
- Polydesmus sumatranus
- Polydesmus superus
- Polydesmus susatensis
- Polydesmus susensis
- Polydesmus syrensis
- Polydesmus tambanus
- Polydesmus tanakai
- Polydesmus taranus
- Polydesmus tarascus
- Polydesmus tatranus
- Polydesmus tenuis
- Polydesmus testaceus
- Polydesmus thwaitesii
- Polydesmus transsilvanicus
- Polydesmus transsylvanicus
- Polydesmus triacanthos
- Polydesmus tricuspidatus
- Polydesmus tridens
- Polydesmus tripunctatus
- Polydesmus undeviginti
- Polydesmus urvillii
- Polydesmus wardaranus
- Polydesmus varians
- Polydesmus velutinus
- Polydesmus vermiculare
- Polydesmus vicarius
- Polydesmus woodianus
- Polydesmus xanthocrepis
- Polydesmus zebratus
- Polydesmus zelebori
- Polydesmus zonkovi

== Gallery ==
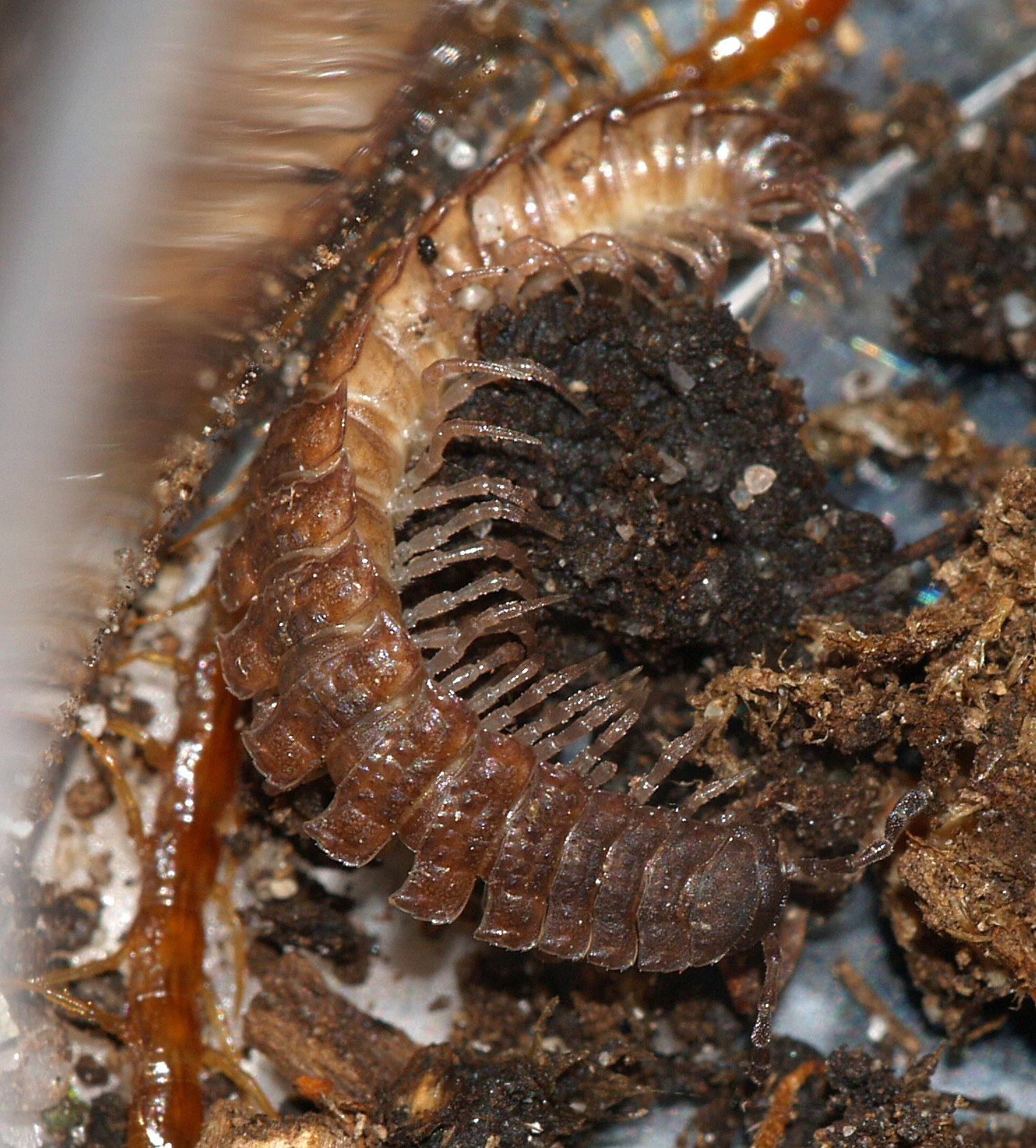
Polydesmus.angustus

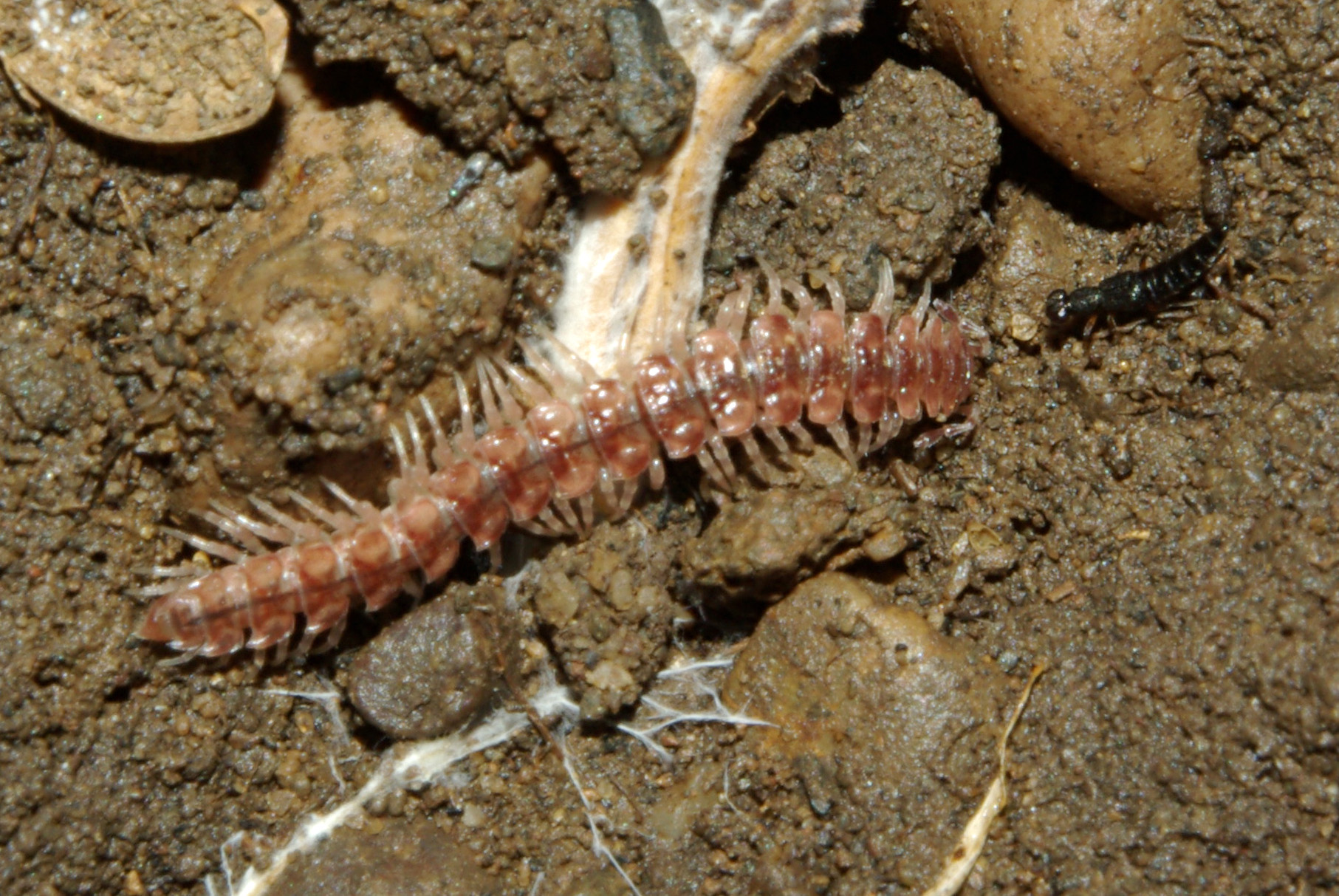
Polydesmus complanatus

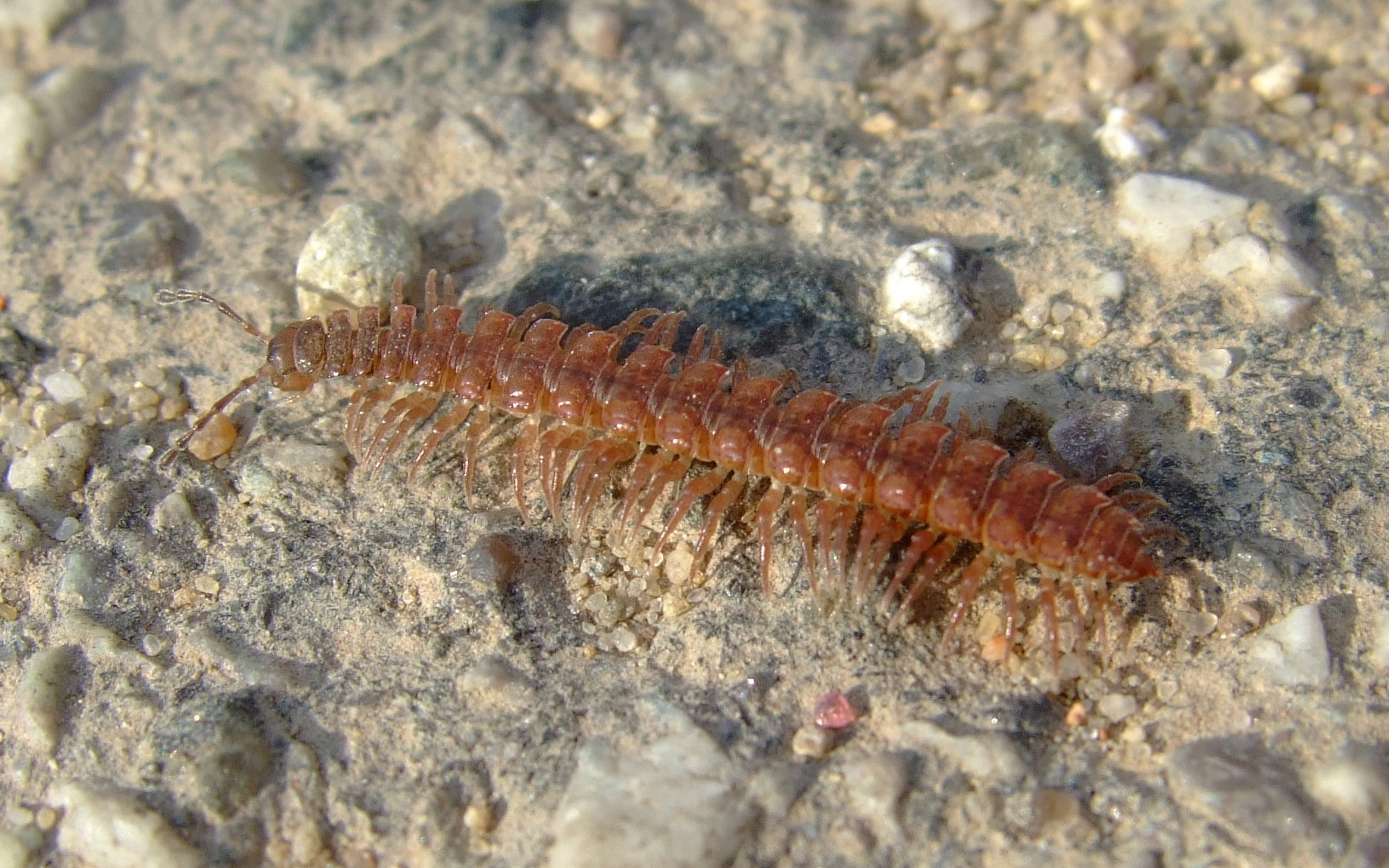
Polydesmus denticulatus

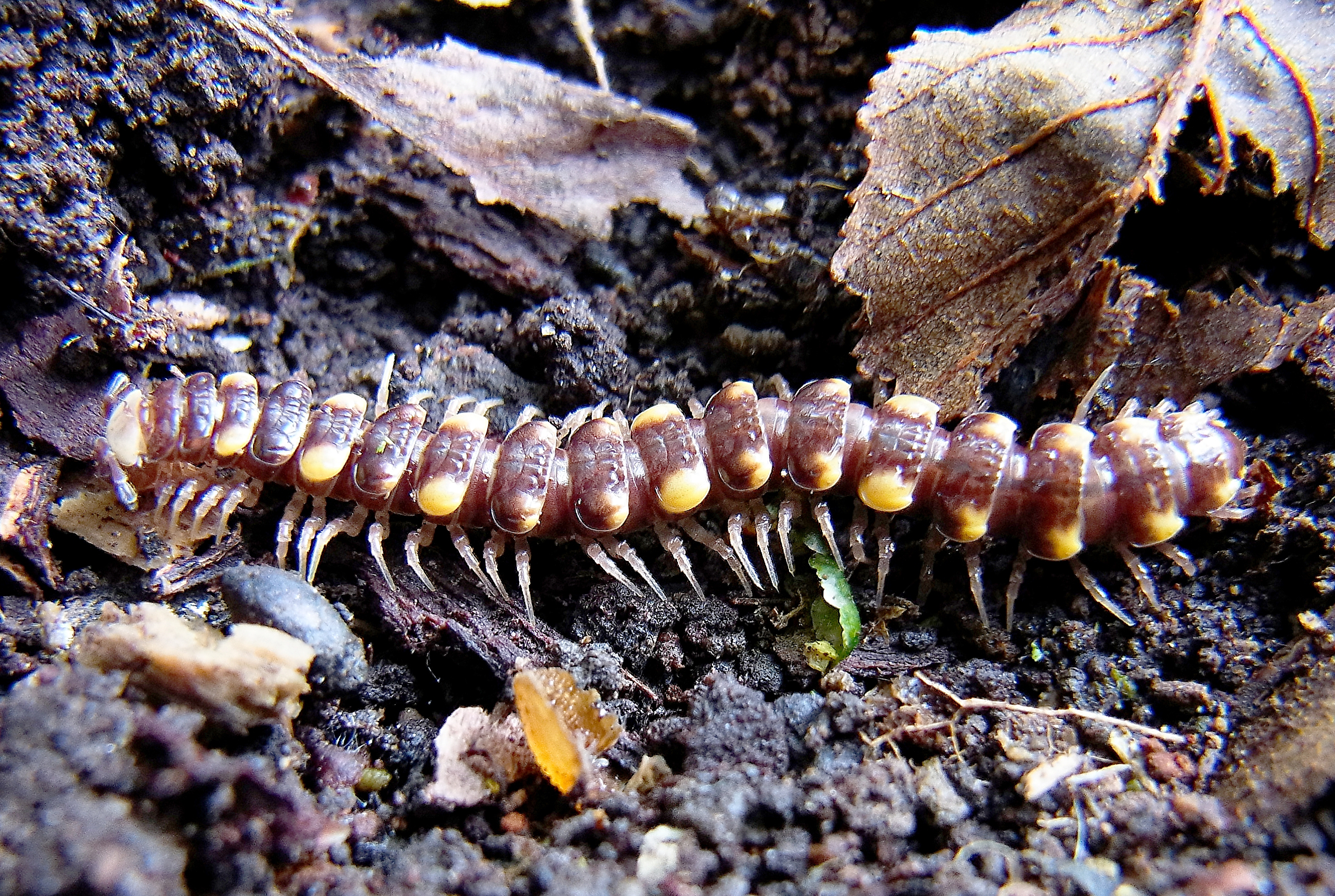
Polydesmus collaris

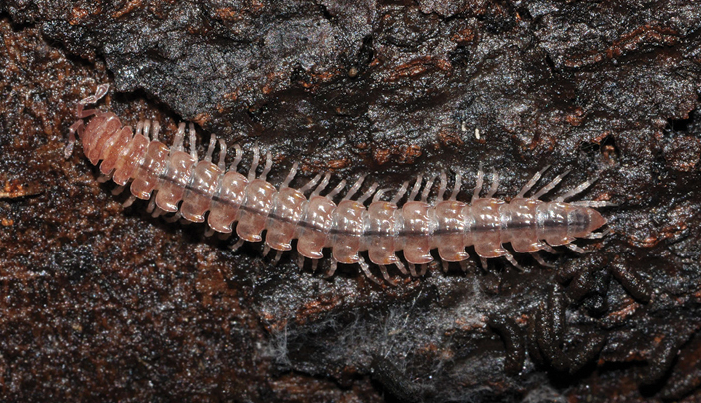
Polydesmus helveticus
