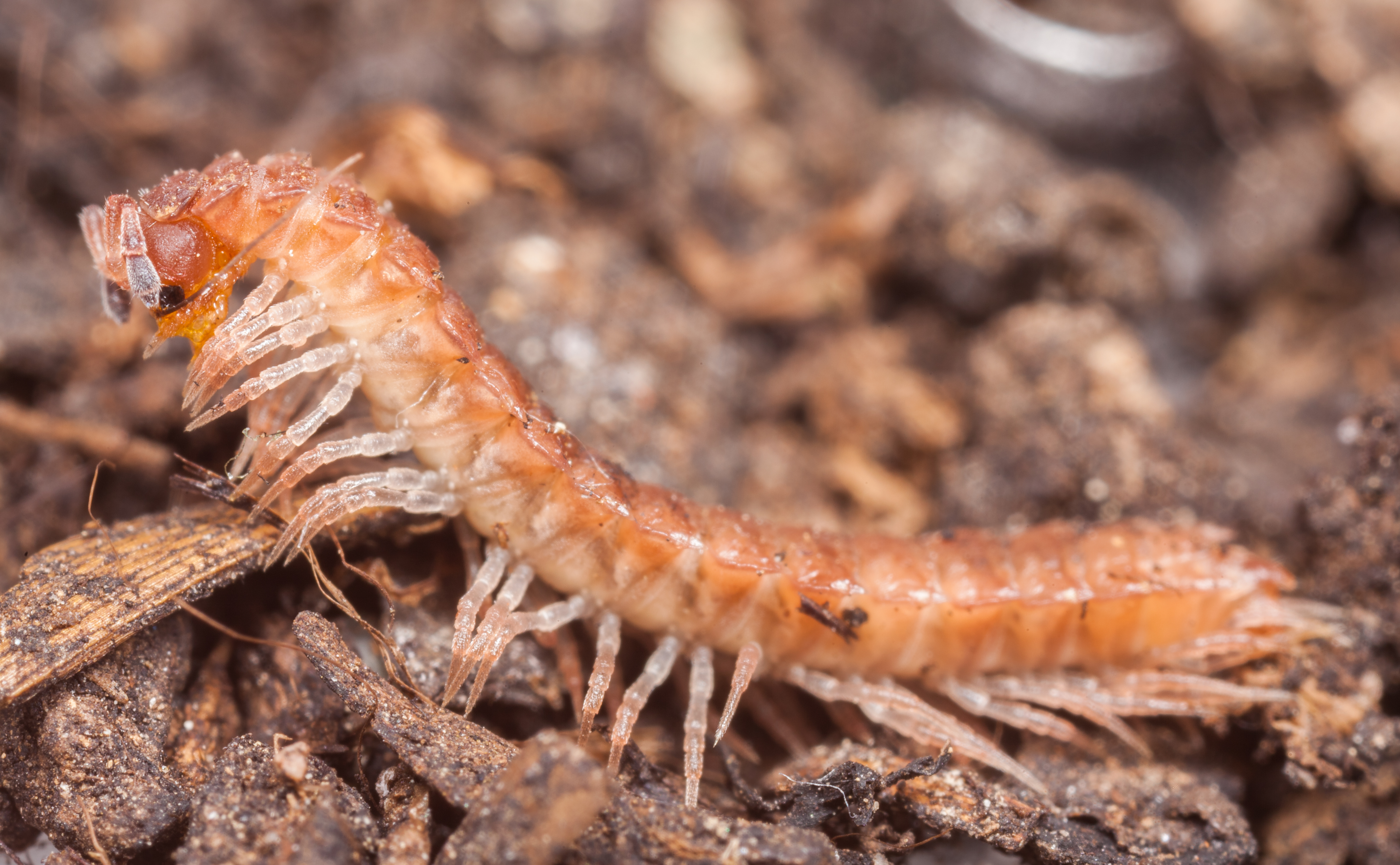
- Brachydesmus superus

Scientific classification
- Kingdom: Animalia
- Phylum: Arthropoda
- Subphylum: Myriapoda
- Class: Diplopoda
- Order: Polydesmida
- Family: Polydesmidae
- Genus: Brachydesmus; Heller, 1858

= Brachydesmus =

Genus of millipedes

Brachydesmus is a genus of millipedes belonging to the family Polydesmidae. The Czech zoologist Camill Heller first described this genus to contain the type species B. subterraneus. This genus now includes about 75 described species.

== Distribution ==
This genus has a Paleactic distribution, with about 70 species in Europe and nearly 80 percent of these European species found in the Balkans. A few species are native to the Caucasus region, Anatolia, Hyrcania, and the Levant. The common species B. superus is especially widespread, found throughout Europe and introduced to the United States, Cape Verde, Madeira, the Azores, and the Canaries.

== Description ==
This genus includes both small and medium-sized polydesmid millipedes. Species in this genus feature little pigmentation or lack pigment altogether. The head is broader than the collum and features abundant bristles and long antennae shaped like clubs. The paranota are well developed. The posterior corners of the anterior segments are rectangular or truncated, but these corners become more acute on the middle and posterior segments.

Species in this genus have only 19 segments as adults (counting the collum, the telson, and the rings in between), one fewer than found in most polydesmid species. Accordingly, adults in this genus have two fewer pairs of legs than most polydesmid adults have: Females have only 29 pairs of legs, and males have only 28 pairs of walking legs (excluding the eighth leg pair, which become a pair of gonopods). Species in this genus arrive at these lower numbers of legs and segments by going through the first seven stages of teloanamorphosis observed in other polydesmids but reaching maturity one molt earlier, in the seventh stage rather than in an eighth stage, and then mating and dying without another molt. Species may be identified as members of this genus based on the form of the gonopod.

== Species ==
Species within this genus include:

- Brachydesmus absoloni
- Brachydesmus amblyotropis
- Brachydesmus apfelbecki
- Brachydesmus assimilis
- Brachydesmus attemsi
- Brachydesmus attemsii
- Brachydesmus attenuatus
- Brachydesmus avalae
- Brachydesmus bebekensis
- Brachydesmus bidentatus
- Brachydesmus bosniensis
- Brachydesmus camerani
- Brachydesmus carniolensis
- Brachydesmus cernagoranus
- Brachydesmus chyzeri
- Brachydesmus cornuatus
- Brachydesmus cristofer
- Brachydesmus croaticus
- Brachydesmus dadayi
- Brachydesmus dadayii
- Brachydesmus dalmaticus
- Brachydesmus doboiensis
- Brachydesmus dolinensis
- Brachydesmus dorsolucidus
- Brachydesmus exiguus
- Brachydesmus ferrugineus
- Brachydesmus filiformis
- Brachydesmus frangipanus
- Brachydesmus frondicola
- Brachydesmus furcatus
- Brachydesmus glabrimarginalis
- Brachydesmus hastatus
- Brachydesmus henrikenghoffi
- Brachydesmus herzegowinensis
- Brachydesmus histricus
- Brachydesmus incisus
- Brachydesmus inferus
- Brachydesmus insculptus
- Brachydesmus institor
- Brachydesmus istanbulensis
- Brachydesmus jalzici
- Brachydesmus jeanelli
- Brachydesmus jubatus
- Brachydesmus kalischewskyi
- Brachydesmus karawajewi
- Brachydesmus langhofferi
- Brachydesmus lapadensis
- Brachydesmus lapidivagus
- Brachydesmus latzelii
- Brachydesmus likanus
- Brachydesmus ljubetensis
- Brachydesmus lobifer
- Brachydesmus macedonicus
- Brachydesmus magnus
- Brachydesmus margaritatus
- Brachydesmus mitis
- Brachydesmus nemilanus
- Brachydesmus novaki
- Brachydesmus parallelus
- Brachydesmus pereliae
- Brachydesmus perfidus
- Brachydesmus peristerensis
- Brachydesmus pigmentatus
- Brachydesmus polydesmoides
- Brachydesmus proximus
- Brachydesmus radewi
- Brachydesmus reversus
- Brachydesmus silvanus
- Brachydesmus spinosus
- Brachydesmus splitensis
- Brachydesmus strasseri
- Brachydesmus stygivagus
- Brachydesmus styricus
- Brachydesmus subterraneus
- Brachydesmus superus
- Brachydesmus talyschanus
- Brachydesmus televensis
- Brachydesmus tetevensis
- Brachydesmus topali
- Brachydesmus troglobius
- Brachydesmus umbraticus
- Brachydesmus velebiticus
- Brachydesmus vermosanus
- Brachydesmus yosemitensis
