= Retrorsia =

Scientific classification
- Kingdom: Animalia
- Phylum: Arthropoda
- Subphylum: Myriapoda
- Class: Diplopoda
- Order: Polydesmida
- Family: Polydesmidae
- Genus: Retrorsia; Shelley, 2003

Type species
- Retrorsia leonardi Shelley, 2003

Genus of millipedes

Retrorsia is a genus of mini-millipedes in the family Polydesmidae.

== Species ==
- Retrorsia benedictae Shelley, 2003
- Retrorsia gracilis Shear & Marek, 2021
- Retrorsia leonardi Shelley, 2003
- Retrorsia richarti Shear & Marek, 2021
- Retrorsia simplicissima Shear & Marek, 2021
