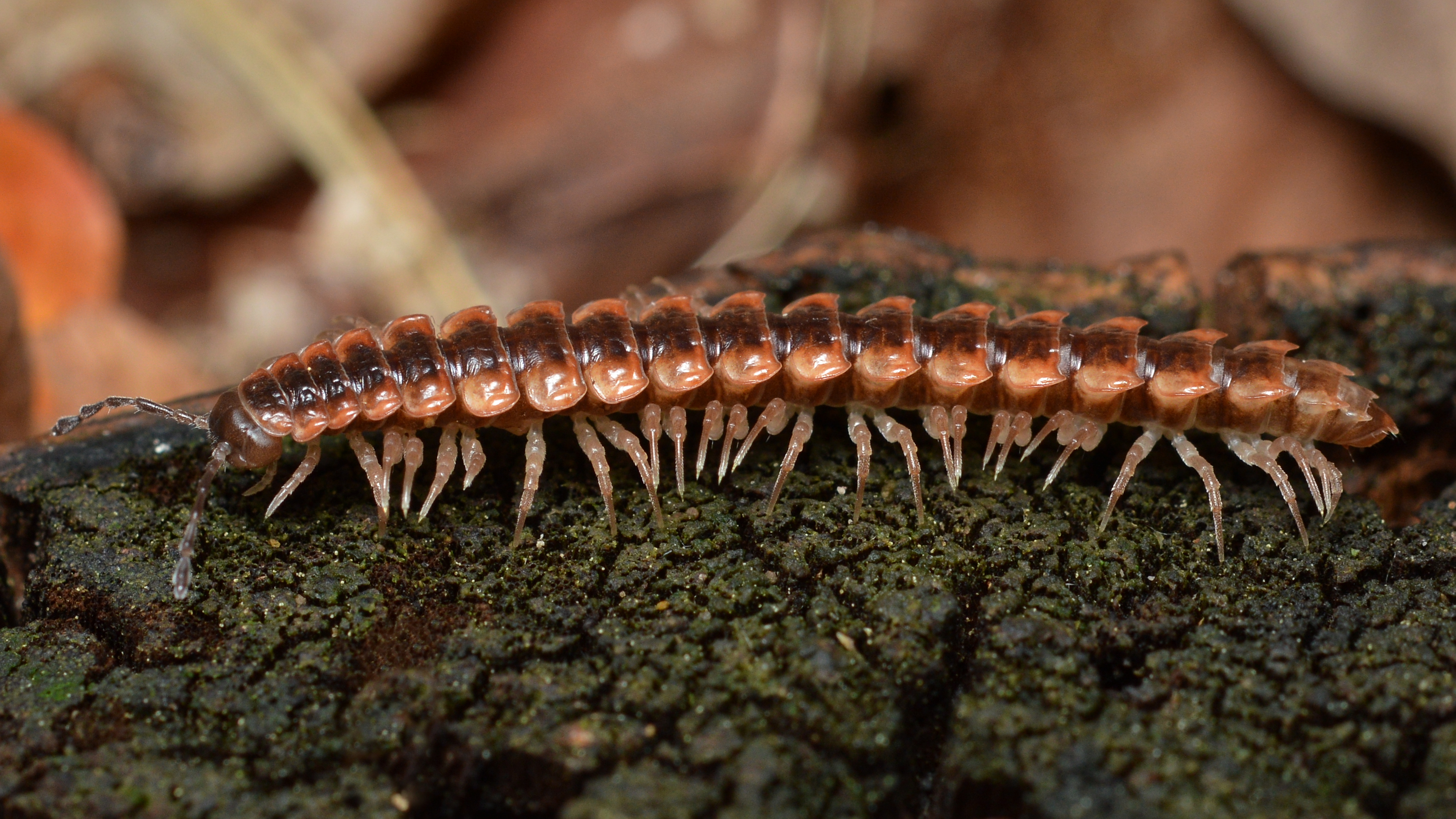
- Pseudopolydesmus canadensis

Scientific classification
- Kingdom: Animalia
- Phylum: Arthropoda
- Subphylum: Myriapoda
- Class: Diplopoda
- Order: Polydesmida
- Family: Polydesmidae
- Genus: Pseudopolydesmus

= Pseudopolydesmus =

Genus of millipedes

Pseudopolydesmus is a genus of flat-backed millipedes in the family Polydesmidae.

== Species ==
Formerly, there were at least 12 described species in the genus Pseudopolydesmus. Presently however, following a review published in 2019 which used scanning electron microscopy and ultraviolet fluorescence to produce detailed images of specimens, only the following eight species are recognised:

- Pseudopolydesmus caddo Chamberlin, 1949
- Pseudopolydesmus canadensis (Newport, 1844)
- Pseudopolydesmus collinus Hoffman, 1974
- Pseudopolydesmus erasus (Loomis, 1943)
- Pseudopolydesmus minor (Bollman, 1888)
- Pseudopolydesmus paludicolus Hoffman, 1950
- Pseudopolydesmus pinetorum (Bollman, 1888)
- Pseudopolydesmus serratus (Say, 1821)
