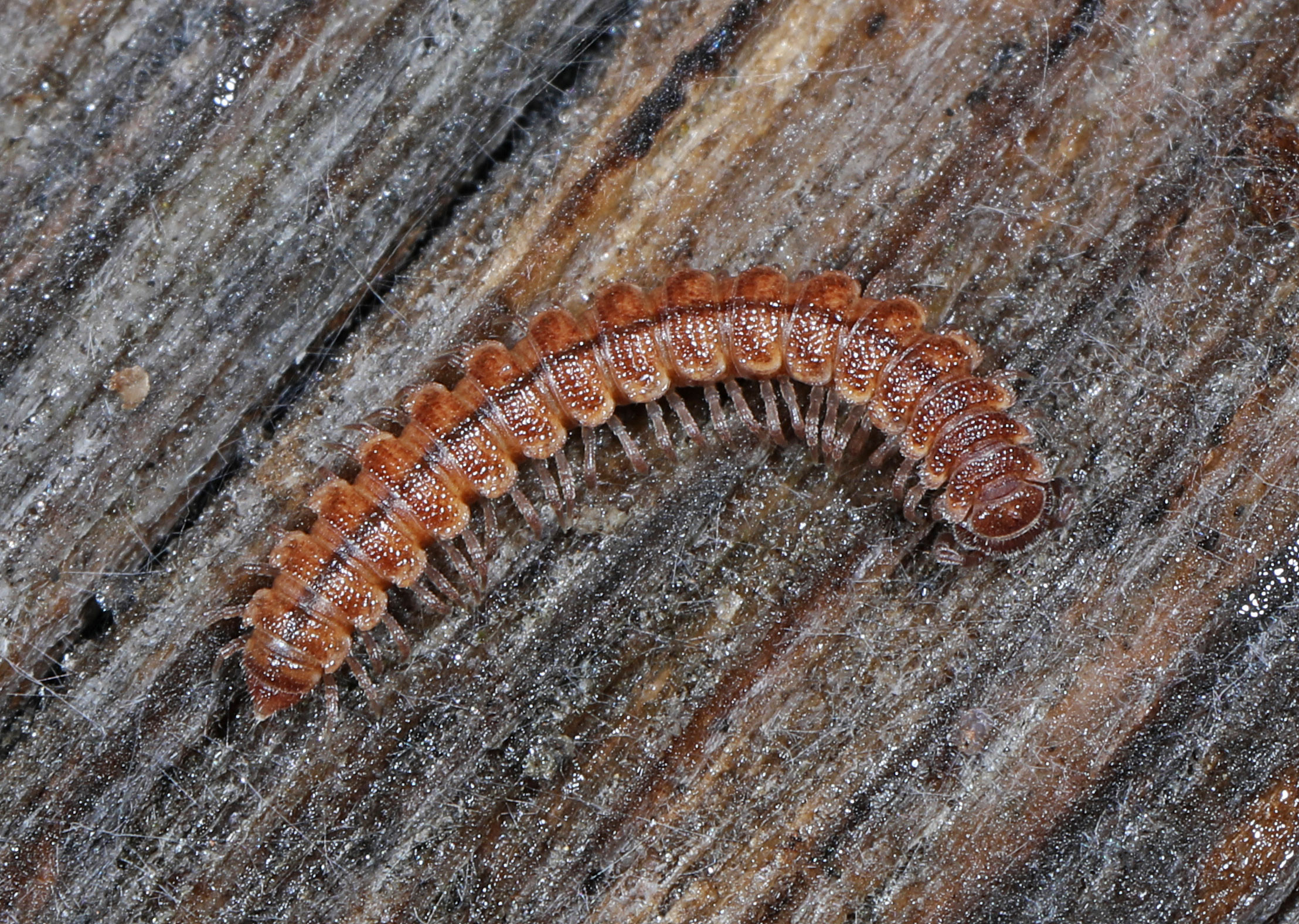

Scientific classification
- Kingdom: Animalia
- Phylum: Arthropoda
- Subphylum: Myriapoda
- Class: Diplopoda
- Order: Polydesmida
- Family: Polydesmidae
- Genus: Scytonotus; Koch, 1847

= Scytonotus =

Genus of millipedes

Scytonotus is a genus of flat-backed millipedes in the family Polydesmidae. There are about 17 described species in Scytonotus.

== Species ==
These 17 species belong to the genus Scytonotus:

- Scytonotus australis Hoffman, 1962
- Scytonotus bergrothi Chamberlin, 1911
- Scytonotus cavernarus Bollman, 1887
- Scytonotus columbianus Chamberlin, 1920
- Scytonotus granulatus (Say, 1821) (granulated millipede)
- Scytonotus inornatus Shelley, 1994
- Scytonotus insulanus Attems, 1931
- Scytonotus laevicollis Koch, 1847
- Scytonotus michauxi Hoffman, 1962
- Scytonotus multituberculatus (Carl, 1905)
- Scytonotus nodulosus Koch, 1847
- Scytonotus orthodox Chamberlin, 1925
- Scytonotus pallidus Attems, 1931
- Scytonotus piger Chamberlin, 1910
- Scytonotus scabricollis Koch & C.L., 1847
- Scytonotus simplex Chamberlin, 1941
- Scytonotus virginicus (Loomis, 1943)
