= Polydesmus progressus =

Scientific classification
- Kingdom: Animalia
- Phylum: Arthropoda
- Subphylum: Myriapoda
- Class: Diplopoda
- Order: Polydesmida
- Family: Polydesmidae
- Genus: Polydesmus
- Species: P. progressus

Binomial name
- Polydesmus progressus Brölemann, 1900

Synonyms
- Perapolydesmus progressus (Brölemann, 1900)

Species of millipede

Polydesmus progressus is a species of flat-backed millipede in the family Polydesmidae. This species is found in France, usually in caves. This millipede exhibits sexual dimorphism in segment number: Whereas adult females of this species feature the 20 segments (counting the collum as the first segment and the telson as the last) usually observed on the order Polydesmida, the adult males feature only 19 segments.

== Discovery, distribution, and habitat ==
This species was first described in 1900 by the French myriapodologist Henri W. Brölemann. He based the original description of this species on specimens including each sex. These specimens were collected from three sites in southern France: the Lombrives cave in department of Ariège, the Bétharram cave in what is now the department of Pyrénées-Atlantiques (formerly Basses-Pyrénées), and the Lautaret cave in the department of Ardèche.

In 1910, Brölemann described a new subspecies, which he named Polydesmus progressus beneharnensis, found to be abundant in the Bétharram cave, and distinguished this subspecies from the more widespread subspecies he described in 1900, which he named Polydesmus progressus typica. He distinguished these subspecies based on differences in the gonopods in adult males after examining a large sample of additional specimens collected from dozens of sites in southern France. This sample included specimens of the more widespread subspecies collected from the Gargas cave in Saint-Laurent-de-Neste in the department of Hautes-Pyrénées, a cave in Limoux in the department of Aude, a cave in Aspet in department of Haute-Garonne, and more than a dozen sites in the department of Ariège, including the Niaux cave in Tarascon-sur-Ariège, three caves in Foix, three caves in Lavelanet, a cave in Tarascon-sur-Ariège, two underground rivers in Varilhes, a cave in Labastide-de-Sérou, and a cave in Oust.

The more widespread subspecies has also been found living on the surface outside of caves. The French zoologist Henri Ribaut reported this subspecies found at ground level in the department of Haute-Garonne. Other specimens have been collected from the soil surface in gardens and under trees in the Gave de Pau valley in the department of Pyrénées-Atlantiques.

== Taxonomy ==
In 1916, Brölemann proposed a new genus, Perapolydesmus, to contain the species originally described as Polydesmus progressus, which he designated as the type species. In 1940, the Austrian myriapodologist Carl Attems moved the species originally described in 1934 as Polydesmus susatensis to the genus Perapolydesmus. Authorities now deem Perapolydesmus to be a junior synonym of Polydesmus, however, thereby returning both species to the genus in which they were originally placed.

== Description ==
This species is small and white. The two subspecies of this species differ in average size: The average adult male of the more widespread subspecies can range from 4.5 mm to 5.6 mm in length and from 0.66 to 0.74 mm in width, whereas the average adult female can range from 6.5 mm to 7.6 mm in length and from 0.8 mm to 0.95 mm in width. The Bétharram subspecies is smaller than typical for this species, with the average adult male measuring 4.5 mm in length and 0.6 in width and the average adult female measuring 6.3 mm in length and 0.8 mm in width.

The antennae are long and shaped like clubs, each slender at the base but with thicker fifth, sixth, and seventh segments. The sixth is the largest segment. The head is wider than the collum, which is shaped like a semicircle. The paranota are well developed and each feature three to five teeth on the lateral edges. The ozopores appear on segments 5, 7, 9, 10, 12, 13, and from 15 to the penultimate segment. The legs are fairly long and feature bristles.

The adult female features 20 segments (including the telson) and 31 pairs of legs, whereas the adult male features only 19 segments and 28 pairs of walking legs, excluding the eighth leg pair, which become a pair of gonopods. Each gonopod features a distal element (telopodite) that divides into two slender branches. The inner branch is shorter and features a pad with a tuft of bristles just before the tip, and these bristles conceal the opening of the seminal groove. The outer branch is longer and ends in a curved point with a hooked tooth just before the tip.

The two subspecies can be distinguished based on features of these gonopods. For example, the hairy pad appears on a very prominent protruding tubercle in the Bétharram subspecies but not in the more widespread subspecies. Furthermore, the outer branch is much longer than the inner branch in the more widespread subspecies, but the inner branch is nearly as long as the outer branch in the Bétharram subspecies.

This species shares many traits with Polydesmus susatensis, and Attems placed these two species together in the genus Perapolydesmus based on these shared traits. For example, both species lack pigment and feature only 19 segments in the adult male. Furthermore, in both species, the head is wider than the collum, the antennae are shaped like clubs, and each gonopod divides into two branches with a shorter seminal branch that features a hairy pad near the tip.

These two species can be distinguished, however, based on other traits. For example, the two branches of the gonopod are divided at the base by a suture in P. susatensis but not in P. progressus. Furthermore, the outer branch of the gonopod is more curved in P. susatensis than in P. progressus, and P. susatensis is also a larger species, with the adult male reaching 12 mm in length.
