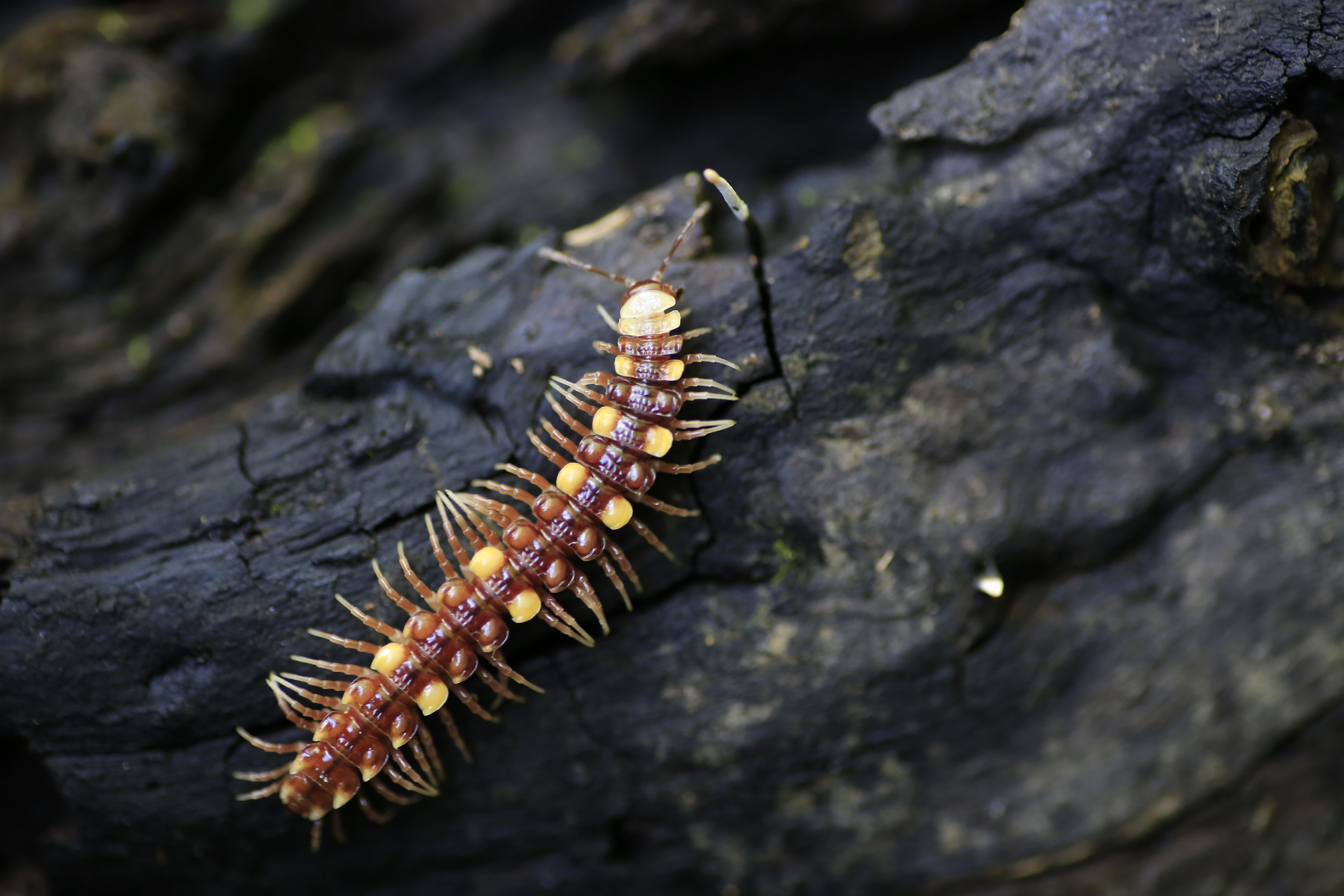
- Polydesmus collaris in central Italy

Scientific classification
- Kingdom: Animalia
- Phylum: Arthropoda
- Subphylum: Myriapoda
- Class: Diplopoda
- Order: Polydesmida
- Suborder: Polydesmidea
- Infraorder: Polydesmoides
- Superfamily: Polydesmoidea
- Family: Polydesmidae; Leach, 1815

Genera
- See text

= Polydesmidae =

Family of millipedes

Polydesmidae is a family of millipedes in the order Polydesmida. This family includes more than 240 species in more than 30 genera. These millipedes have a mostly Holarctic distribution that extends south not only to Mexico and North Africa but also as far as Java. Most species are found in the Mediterranean region.

== Description ==
These millipedes range from 4 mm to 30 mm in length. Colors range from pitch black through reddish or brownish to pallid and are rarely vivid. The collum is small, in the shape of a transverse oval, with a smooth anterior margin. The paranota are simple but usually well developed and dentate laterally. This family includes the notable species Polydesmus progressus, which exhibits sexual dimorphism in segment number: Whereas adult females of this species feature the 20 segments (counting the collum as the first segment and the telson as the last) usually observed on the order Polydesmida, the adult males feature only 19 segments.

== Genera ==
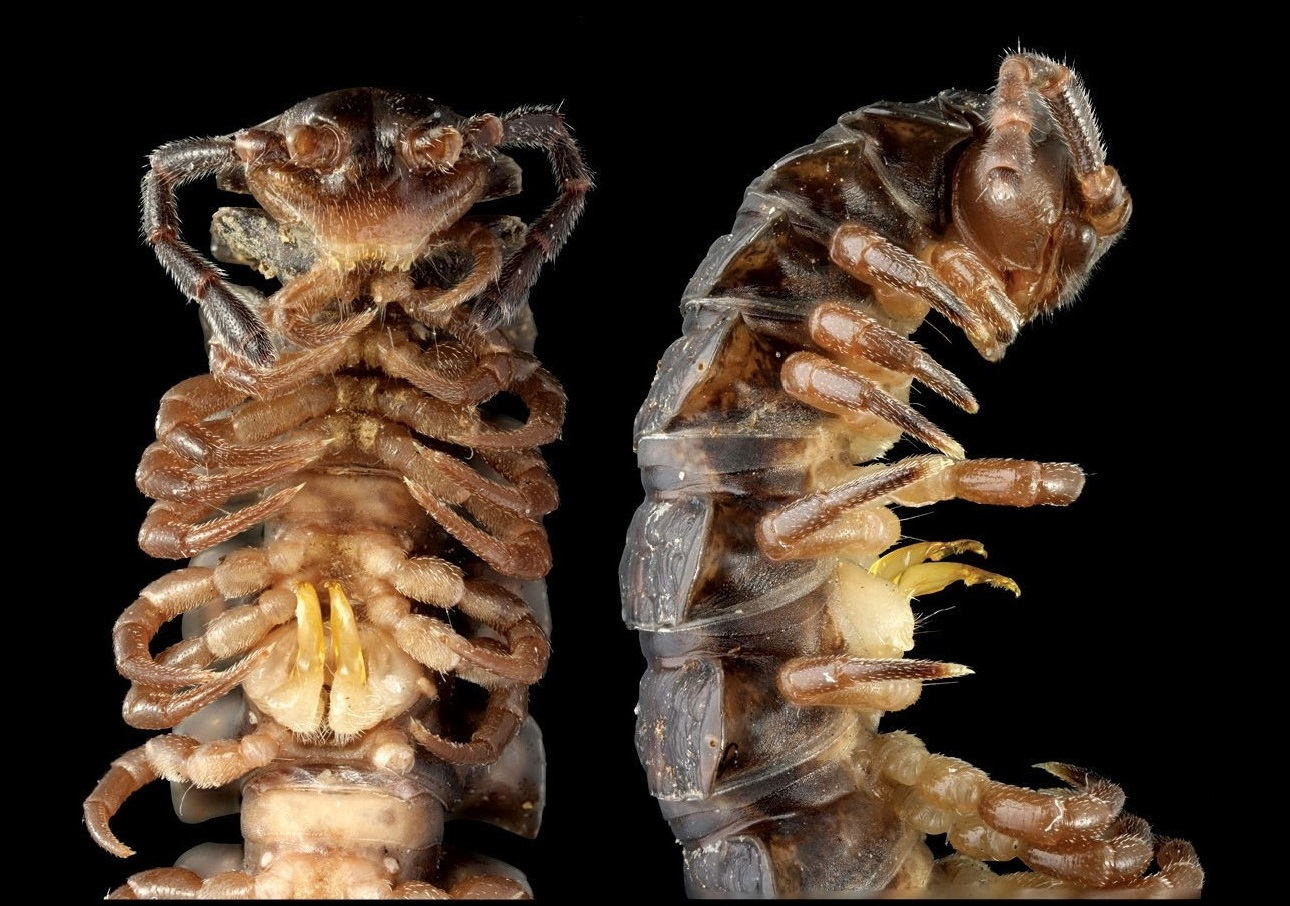
Male Nipponesmus shirinensis from Taiwan in ventral and lateral view

- Antrochodus
- Archipolydesmus
- Basicentrus
- Bhutanodesmus
- Bidentogon
- Bosniodesmus
- Bosporodesmus
- Brachydesmus
- Brembosoma
- Calianotus
- Chromobrachydesmus
- Cretodesmus
- Dixidesmus
- Epanerchodus
- Eumastigonodesmus
- Goniodesmus
- Haplobrachidesmus
- Haplocookia
- Heterocookia
- Himalodesmus
- Hispaniodesmus
- Huzichodus
- Jaxartes
- Kirgisdesmus
- Leptobrachydesmus
- Lophobrachydesmus
- Mastigonodesmus
- Mastuchus
- Merioceratium
- Niponchodus
- Nipponesmus
- Nomarchus
- Pacidesmus
- Peltogonopus
- Perapolydesmus
- Polydesmus
- Prionomatis
- Propolydesmus
- Pseudopolydesmus
- Retrorsia
- Riuerchodus
- Sardodesmus
- Schedoleiodesmus
- Schizobrachydesmus
- Schizomeritius
- Schizoturanius
- Scytonotus
- Serradium
- Spanobrachium
- Speodesmus
- Stylobrachydesmus
- Telopoditius
- Tolosanius
- Trachynotus
- Troglobrachydesmus
- Turanodesmus
- Uniramidesmus
- Usbekodesmus
- Utadesmus
