= Atopetholus angelus =

Scientific classification
- Kingdom: Animalia
- Phylum: Arthropoda
- Subphylum: Myriapoda
- Class: Diplopoda
- Order: Spirobolida
- Family: Atopetholidae
- Genus: Atopetholus
- Species: A. angelus

Binomial name
- Atopetholus angelus Chamberlin, 1920

Species of millipede

Atopetholus angelus is a species of millipede in the family Atopetholidae. It is found in North America.
