= List of Anadenobolus species =

These 101 species belong to Anadenobolus, a genus of millipedes in the family Rhinocricidae.

== Anadenobolus species ==
- Anadenobolus anguinus (Pocock, 1894)
- Anadenobolus angusticollis (Karsch, 1881)
- Anadenobolus aposematus (Pocock, 1907)
- Anadenobolus approximans (Hoffman, 1950)
- Anadenobolus approximatus (Loomis, 1968)
- Anadenobolus arboreus (DeSaussure, 1859)
- Anadenobolus atoyacus Pocock, 1907
- Anadenobolus aurocinctus (Pocock, 1907)
- Anadenobolus aztecus (DeSaussure, 1859)
- Anadenobolus beliganus Chamberlin, 1918
- Anadenobolus brevicollis (Voges, 1878)
- Anadenobolus bruesi (Chamberlin, 1918)
- Anadenobolus centralis (Chamberlin, 1922)
- Anadenobolus chamberlini (Schubart, 1951)
- Anadenobolus chazaliei (Brolemann, 1900)
- Anadenobolus chichen (Chamberlin, 1953)
- Anadenobolus chichimecus (DeSaussure, 1859)
- Anadenobolus chitarianus (Chamberlin, 1933)
- Anadenobolus cinchonanus (Chamberlin, 1922)
- Anadenobolus consociatus (Pocock, 1894)
- Anadenobolus consutus (Loomis, 1936)
- Anadenobolus costaricensis (Brolemann, 1905)
- Anadenobolus cuba (Perez-Asso, 1998)
- Anadenobolus curtior (Chamberlin, 1918)
- Anadenobolus dentatus (Perez-Asso, 1998)
- Anadenobolus dissimulans Bond & Sierwald, 2003
- Anadenobolus dugesi (Bollman, 1893)
- Anadenobolus edenus (Chamberlin, 1947)
- Anadenobolus escambray (Perez-Asso, 1998)
- Anadenobolus excisus (Karsch, 1881)
- Anadenobolus ferrugineus (Daday, 1889)
- Anadenobolus gisleni (Verhoeff, 1941)
- Anadenobolus gracilipes (Karsch, 1881)
- Anadenobolus grammostictus (Pocock, 1894)
- Anadenobolus grenadensis (Pocock, 1894)
- Anadenobolus guadeloupensis (Chamberlin, 1918)
- Anadenobolus hegedusi (Daday, 1889)
- Anadenobolus hegedussi (Daday, 1889)
- Anadenobolus heteroscopus (Chamberlin, 1918)
- Anadenobolus holomelanus (Pocock, 1894)
- Anadenobolus insulatus (Chamberlin, 1925)
- Anadenobolus ixtapanus (Chamberlin, 1943)
- Anadenobolus jibacoa (Perez-Asso, 1998)
- Anadenobolus juxtus (Chamberlin, 1918)
- Anadenobolus lamprus (Chamberlin, 1943)
- Anadenobolus laticollis (Loomis, 1934)
- Anadenobolus leptopus (Pocock, 1894)
- Anadenobolus leucostigma (Pocock, 1894)
- Anadenobolus liparius (Chamberlin, 1918)
- Anadenobolus liparus (Chamberlin, 1918)
- Anadenobolus macropus (Pocock, 1894)
- Anadenobolus malkini (Chamberlin, 1956)
- Anadenobolus marci (Pocock, 1907)
- Anadenobolus mayanus (Chamberlin, 1947)
- Anadenobolus mediator (Chamberlin, 1918)
- Anadenobolus mertensi (Kraus, 1954)
- Anadenobolus modestior (Silvestri, 1905)
- Anadenobolus monilicornis (von Porat, 1876) (yellow-banded millipede)
- Anadenobolus monitongo (Perez-Asso, 1998)
- Anadenobolus morelus (Chamberlin, 1943)
- Anadenobolus motulensis (Chamberlin, 1938)
- Anadenobolus newtonianus (Chamberlin, 1918)
- Anadenobolus nicaraguanus (Chamberlin, 1922)
- Anadenobolus nitidanus (Brölemann, 1919)
- Anadenobolus nodosicollis (Brolemann, 1905)
- Anadenobolus obesus (Brolemann, 1900)
- Anadenobolus ochraceus (Brölemann, 1900)
- Anadenobolus ocraceus (Brolemann, 1900)
- Anadenobolus olivaceus (Newport, 1844)
- Anadenobolus pedernales Peréz-Asso, 2004
- Anadenobolus pedrocola (Chamberlin, 1947)
- Anadenobolus perplicatus (Loomis, 1938)
- Anadenobolus pertenuis (Loomis, 1938)
- Anadenobolus plesius (Chamberlin, 1914)
- Anadenobolus politus (von Porat, 1888)
- Anadenobolus potosianus (Chamberlin, 1941)
- Anadenobolus potrerillo (Perez-Asso, 1998)
- Anadenobolus putealis (Loomis, 1971)
- Anadenobolus ramagei (Pocock, 1894)
- Anadenobolus rarior (Chamberlin, 1918)
- Anadenobolus rixi (Pocock, 1907)
- Anadenobolus rogersi (Pocock, 1907)
- Anadenobolus sagittatus (Loomis, 1938)
- Anadenobolus salleanus (Pocock, 1907)
- Anadenobolus scobinatus (Pocock, 1907)
- Anadenobolus simulans (Chamberlin, 1922)
- Anadenobolus simulatus (Chamberlin, 1950)
- Anadenobolus sinuosus (Loomis, 1938)
- Anadenobolus smithi (Pocock, 1907)
- Anadenobolus socius (Chamberlin, 1918)
- Anadenobolus stolli (Pocock, 1907)
- Anadenobolus tejerianus (Chamberlin, 1953)
- Anadenobolus toltecus (DeSaussure, 1859)
- Anadenobolus totanacus (De Saussure, 1860)
- Anadenobolus totonacus (DeSaussure, 1860)
- Anadenobolus translocatus (Loomis, 1975)
- Anadenobolus varians (Brölemann, 1901)
- Anadenobolus vincenti (Pocock, 1894)
- Anadenobolus vincentii (Pocock, 1894)
- Anadenobolus williamsi (Chamberlin, 1940)
- Anadenobolus zapotecus (DeSaussure, 1860)
