= Spirobolellus simplex =

Conservation status
- Critically endangered, possibly extinct (IUCN 3.1)

Scientific classification
- Kingdom: Animalia
- Phylum: Arthropoda
- Subphylum: Myriapoda
- Class: Diplopoda
- Order: Spirobolida
- Family: Spirobolellidae
- Genus: Spirobolellus
- Species: S. simplex

Binomial name
- Spirobolellus simplex Golovatch & Korsós, 1992

Species of millipede

Spirobolellus simplex is a species of millipede in the family Spirobolidae. The species hasn't been found since 1951, and is listed as critically endangered-possibly extinct.
