= Onychelus obustus =

Scientific classification
- Domain: Eukaryota
- Kingdom: Animalia
- Phylum: Arthropoda
- Subphylum: Myriapoda
- Class: Diplopoda
- Order: Spirobolida
- Family: Atopetholidae
- Genus: Onychelus
- Species: O. obustus

Binomial name
- Onychelus obustus Cook, 1904

Species of millipede

Onychelus obustus is a species of millipede in the family Atopetholidae. It is found in North America.
