= Spirobolellus praslinus =

Conservation status
- Extinct (IUCN 3.1)

Scientific classification
- Domain: Eukaryota
- Kingdom: Animalia
- Phylum: Arthropoda
- Subphylum: Myriapoda
- Class: Diplopoda
- Order: Spirobolida
- Family: Spirobolellidae
- Genus: Spirobolellus
- Species: †S. praslinus

Binomial name
- †Spirobolellus praslinus (Saussure & Zehntner, 1902)

Species of myriapod

Spirobolellus praslinus is an extinct species of millipede in the family Spirobolidae. The species was endemic to Praslin in the Seychelles.
