= Xenobolus acuticonus =

Scientific classification
- Kingdom: Animalia
- Phylum: Arthropoda
- Subphylum: Myriapoda
- Class: Diplopoda
- Order: Spirobolida
- Family: Pachybolidae
- Genus: Xenobolus
- Species: X. acuticonus

Binomial name
- Xenobolus acuticonus Attems, 1936

Species of millipede

Xenobolus acuticonus is a species of spirobolidan millipede. It was first described in 1936 by Carl Attems and is endemic to India.
