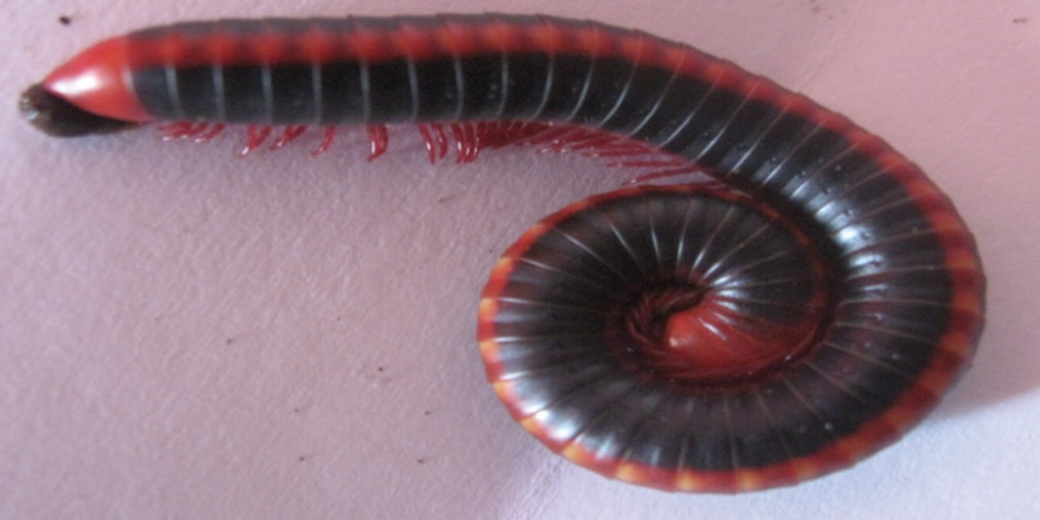
- Xenobolus carnifex

Scientific classification
- Kingdom: Animalia
- Phylum: Arthropoda
- Subphylum: Myriapoda
- Class: Diplopoda
- Order: Spirobolida
- Family: Pachybolidae
- Subfamily: Spiromiminae
- Genus: Xenobolus; Carl, 1919

Species
- Xenobolus acuticonus Xenobolus carnifex

Synonyms
- Diaphoropus Silvestri, 1897; Erythroprosopon Verhoeff, 1936

= Xenobolus =

Genus of millipedes

Xenobolus is a genus of millipedes in the family Pachybolidae, containing two species found in India and Sri Lanka. The species are unusual within the Pachybolidae in being boldly colored with red bands or spots on a blackish background color.
