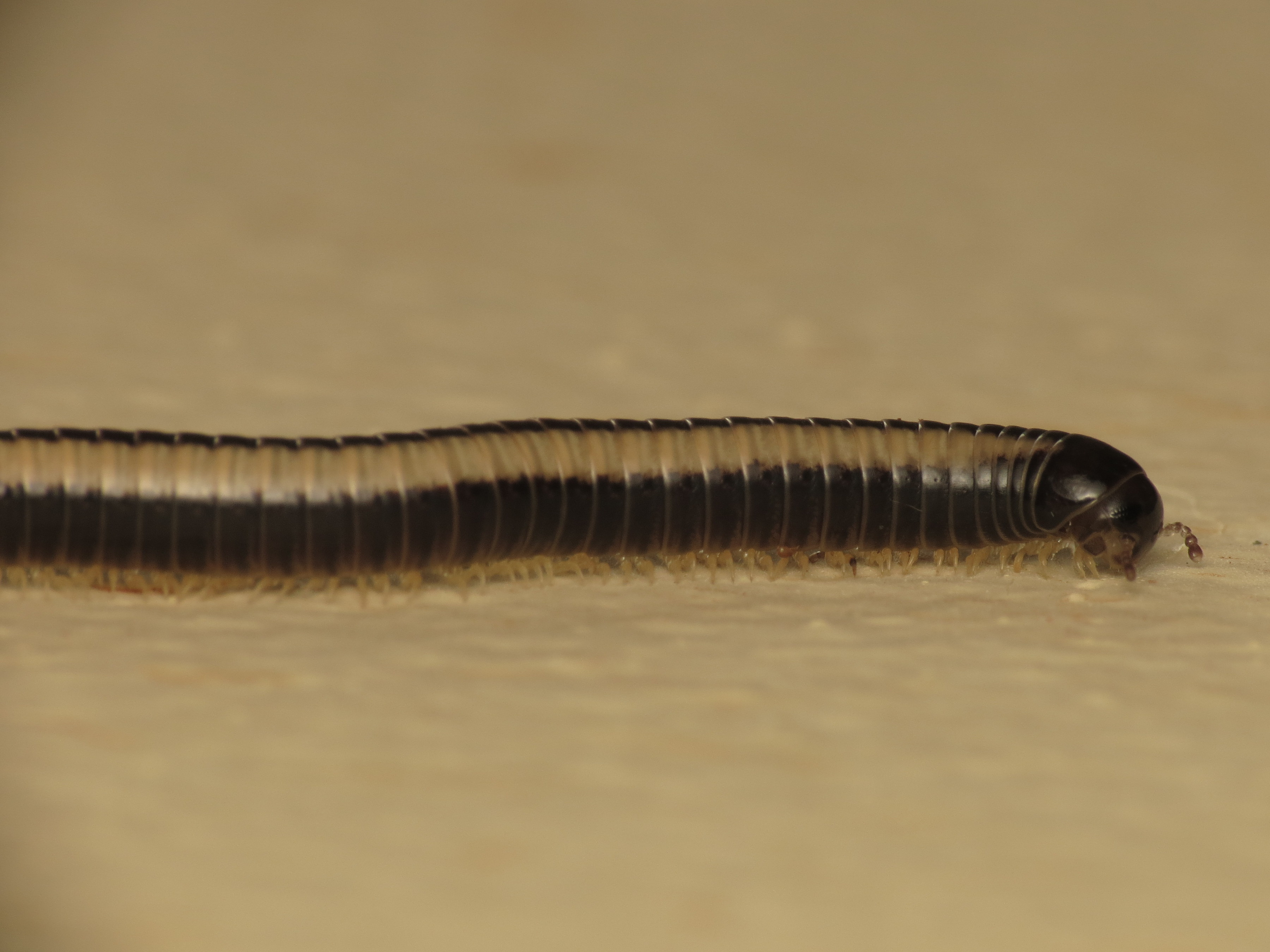
- Spirobolellus sp.

Scientific classification
- Kingdom: Animalia
- Phylum: Arthropoda
- Subphylum: Myriapoda
- Class: Diplopoda
- Order: Spirobolida
- Family: Spirobolellidae
- Genus: Spirobolellus; Pocock, 1894

Type species
- Spirobolellus chrysodirus

= Spirobolellus =

Genus of millipedes

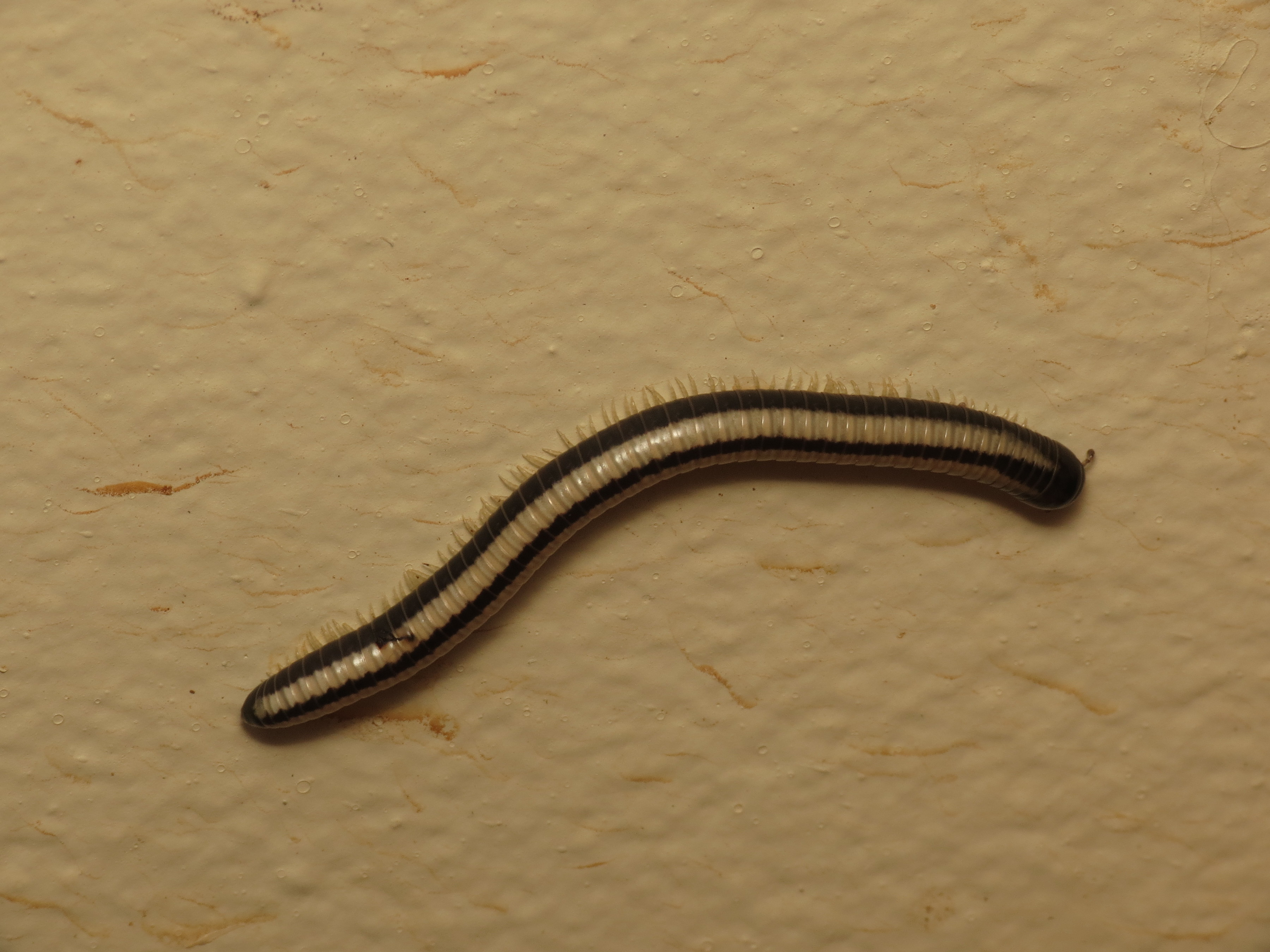
Spirobolellus sp.

Spirobolellus is a genus of millipedes in the family Spirobolellidae and order Spirobolida.

== Description ==
Millipedes of this genus are small in size. The body has longitudinal pale bands. The eyes are large, subcircular and widely separated. The antennae are short with the first segment as large as the second. The frontal sulcus is weak. The labral pores have a 4 + 4 arrangement. The collum is large. The transverse sulcus is obsolete at least dorsally, being replaced by a groove, and the area behind this groove is elevated.

== Species ==
This genus comprises the following species:

- Spirobolellus albidicollis (Porat, 1888)
- Spirobolellus ambiguus Carl, 1926
- Spirobolellus antipodarum (Newport, 1843)
- Spirobolellus australianus (Chamberlin, 1920)
- Spirobolellus baracoa Perez-Asso, 1998
- Spirobolellus belonanus (Chamberlin, 1918)
- Spirobolellus bivittatus (Verhoeff, 1924)
- Spirobolellus canalensis Carl, 1926
- Spirobolellus chrysodirus Pocock, 1894
- Spirobolellus chrysogrammus Pocock, 1894
- Spirobolellus chrysoproctus Pocock, 1895
- Spirobolellus claviger (Verhoeff, 1939)
- Spirobolellus comicus Carl, 1926
- Spirobolellus concinnus (Loomis, 1936)
- Spirobolellus conspicullatus (Loomis, 1938)
- Spirobolellus dimidiatus Carl, 1926
- Spirobolellus dispersus Carl, 1926
- Spirobolellus dorsetti (Loomis, 1934)
- Spirobolellus dorsovittatus (Verhoeff, 1928)
- Spirobolellus drymophilus Chamberlin, 1920
- Spirobolellus duplus Jeekel, 2001
- Spirobolellus eremus (Chamberlin, 1922)
- Spirobolellus erythrotermus (Loomis, 1936)
- Spirobolellus escambray Perez-Asso, 1998
- Spirobolellus esulcatus (Loomis, 1936)
- Spirobolellus exiguus Carl, 1926
- Spirobolellus expulsus Carl, 1926
- Spirobolellus fallax Carl, 1926
- Spirobolellus fontis (Chamberlin, 1918)
- Spirobolellus fuhrmanni (Carl, 1914)
- Spirobolellus furcianus (Loomis, 1936)
- Spirobolellus gemellus Jeekel, 2003
- Spirobolellus grammicus (Chamberlin, 1925)
- Spirobolellus granularis Jeekel, 2003
- Spirobolellus immigrans (Chamberlin, 1920)
- Spirobolellus instratus (Loomis, 1941)
- Spirobolellus insulanus (Porat, 1888)
- Spirobolellus insularis (Silvestri, 1908)
- Spirobolellus insularum (Verhoeft, 1928)
- Spirobolellus kurandanus Chamberlin, 1920
- Spirobolellus kurtschevae Golovatch, Mauriès & Akkari, 2020
- Spirobolellus leucopygus Carl, 1926
- Spirobolellus lineatus (Chamberlin, 1918)
- Spirobolellus marmoratus (Silvestri, 1908)
- Spirobolellus mayori (Carl, 1914)
- Spirobolellus mediolus (Chamberlin, 1950)
- Spirobolellus mimus (Chamberlin, 1922)
- Spirobolellus minutus Carl, 1926
- Spirobolellus mjoebergi (Verhoeff, 1924)
- Spirobolellus modestus Carl, 1926
- Spirobolellus modiglianii Silvestri, 1895
- Spirobolellus montanus Carl, 1926
- Spirobolellus nanus Silvestri, 1895
- Spirobolellus nigntulus Silvestri, 1878
- Spirobolellus nigricornis Carl, 1926
- Spirobolellus perstriatus Silvestri, 1895
- Spirobolellus philiporum Jeekel, 1986
- Spirobolellus phosphoreus Takakuwa, 1941
- Spirobolellus phthisicus Carl, 1926
- Spirobolellus pinarensis Perez-Asso, 1998
- Spirobolellus praslinus Saussure & Zehntner, 1902
- Spirobolellus pulcher (Porat, 1888)
- Spirobolellus pullus (Loomis, 1941)
- Spirobolellus rainbowi Brölemann, 1913
- Spirobolellus reischeki (Attems, 1953)
- Spirobolellus richmondi (Chamberlin, 1922)
- Spirobolellus rouxi Carl, 1926
- Spirobolellus rufocinctus Carl, 1926
- Spirobolellus sarasini Carl, 1926
- Spirobolellus scheltemai Jeekel, 2002
- Spirobolellus sigillatus (Loomis, 1934)
- Spirobolellus signatus (Loomis, 1941)
- Spirobolellus simplex Golovatch & Korsós, 1992
- Spirobolellus sjoestedti (Verhoeff, 1924)
- Spirobolellus solitarius Carl, 1912
- Spirobolellus splendens Silvestri, 1895
- Spirobolellus subterraneus Carl, 1926
- Spirobolellus taeniatus Carl, 1926
- Spirobolellus takakuwai Wang, 1961
- Spirobolellus tenuipes (Loomis, 1941)
- Spirobolellus toronus (Chamberlin, 1950)
- Spirobolellus trifasciatus (Loomis, 1964)
- Spirobolellus tschernovi Golovatch.Mauriès & Akkari, 2020
- Spirobolellus wachlerinus Chamberlin, 1949
- Spirobolellus xylophilus Carl, 1926
- Spirobolellus yatensis Carl, 1926
