= Spiromanes =

Scientific classification
- Domain: Eukaryota
- Kingdom: Animalia
- Phylum: Arthropoda
- Subphylum: Myriapoda
- Class: Diplopoda
- Order: Spirobolida
- Family: Pachybolidae
- Genus: Spiromanes; De Saussure & Zehntner, 1902

Genus of millipede

Spiromanes is a genus of millipedes in the family Pachybolidae.

== Species ==
The following species are recognized:

- Spiromanes braueri (Attems, 1900)
- Spiromanes sechellarum Saussure & Zehntner, 1902
- Spiromanes seychellarum (De Saussure & Zehntner, 1902)
