= Allopocockia =

Scientific classification
- Domain: Eukaryota
- Kingdom: Animalia
- Phylum: Arthropoda
- Subphylum: Myriapoda
- Class: Diplopoda
- Order: Spirobolida
- Family: Allopocockiidae
- Genus: Allopocockia; Brölemann, 1913

Animal classification

Allopocockia is a genus of millipedes in the family Allopocockiidae.

== Species ==
There are two species recognized in this genus:

- Allopocockia rotundata Kraus, 1954
- Allopocockia tylopus (Pocock, 1908)
