= Onychelus =

Scientific classification
- Domain: Eukaryota
- Kingdom: Animalia
- Phylum: Arthropoda
- Subphylum: Myriapoda
- Class: Diplopoda
- Order: Spirobolida
- Family: Atopetholidae
- Genus: Onychelus; Cook, 1904

Genus of millipedes

Onychelus is a genus of millipedes in the family Atopetholidae. There are at least three described species in Onychelus.

== Species ==
These three species belong to the genus Onychelus:

- Onychelus michelbacheri Verhoeff, 1938
- Onychelus obustus Cook, 1904
- Onychelus suturatus Cook, 1911
