= Atopetholus =

Scientific classification
- Kingdom: Animalia
- Phylum: Arthropoda
- Subphylum: Myriapoda
- Class: Diplopoda
- Order: Spirobolida
- Family: Atopetholidae
- Genus: Atopetholus; Chamberlin, 1918

Genus of millipedes

Atopetholus is a genus of millipedes in the family Atopetholidae. There are about eight described species in Atopetholus.

== Species ==
These eight species belong to the genus Atopetholus:

- Atopetholus angelus Chamberlin, 1920
- Atopetholus barbaranus Chamberlin, 1949
- Atopetholus californicus Chamberlin, 1918
- Atopetholus carmelitus Chamberlin, 1940
- Atopetholus fraternus Chamberlin, 1918
- Atopetholus michelbacheri (Verhoeff, 1938)
- Atopetholus paroicus Chamberlin, 1941
- Atopetholus pearcei Chamberlin, 1950
