= Spiromimus =

Scientific classification
- Kingdom: Animalia
- Phylum: Arthropoda
- Subphylum: Myriapoda
- Class: Diplopoda
- Order: Spirobolida
- Family: Pachybolidae
- Genus: Spiromimus; De Saussure & Zehntner, 1901

Genus of millipedes

Spiromimus is a genus of millipedes in the family Pachybolidae. They mostly live in rainforests and dry land in Madagascar.

== Species ==
- Spiromimus albipes
- Spiromimus dorsovittatus
- Spiromimus grallator
- Spiromimus electricus
- Spiromimus endemicus
- Spiromimus laticoxalis
- Spiromimus litoralis
- Spiromimus namoroka
- Spiromimus scapularis
- Spiromimus simplex
- Spiromimus simplicicoxalis
- Spiromimus simplicoxalis
- Spiromimus triaureus
- Spiromimus univirgatus
- Spiromimus voeltzkowi
