= Tonkinbolus =

Scientific classification
- Kingdom: Animalia
- Phylum: Arthropoda
- Subphylum: Myriapoda
- Class: Diplopoda
- Order: Spirobolida
- Family: Pachybolidae
- Genus: Tonkinbolus; Verhoeff, 1938

Genus of millipedes

Tonkinbolus is a genus of millipedes in the family Pachybolidae. It contains species found in Myanmar and Vietnam. The species Tonkinbolus caudulanus was described by Karsch in 1881, and the genus was named by Verhoeff in 1938.

== Species ==
- Tonkinbolus caudulanus
- Tonkinbolus dollfusi
- Tonkinbolus scaber
