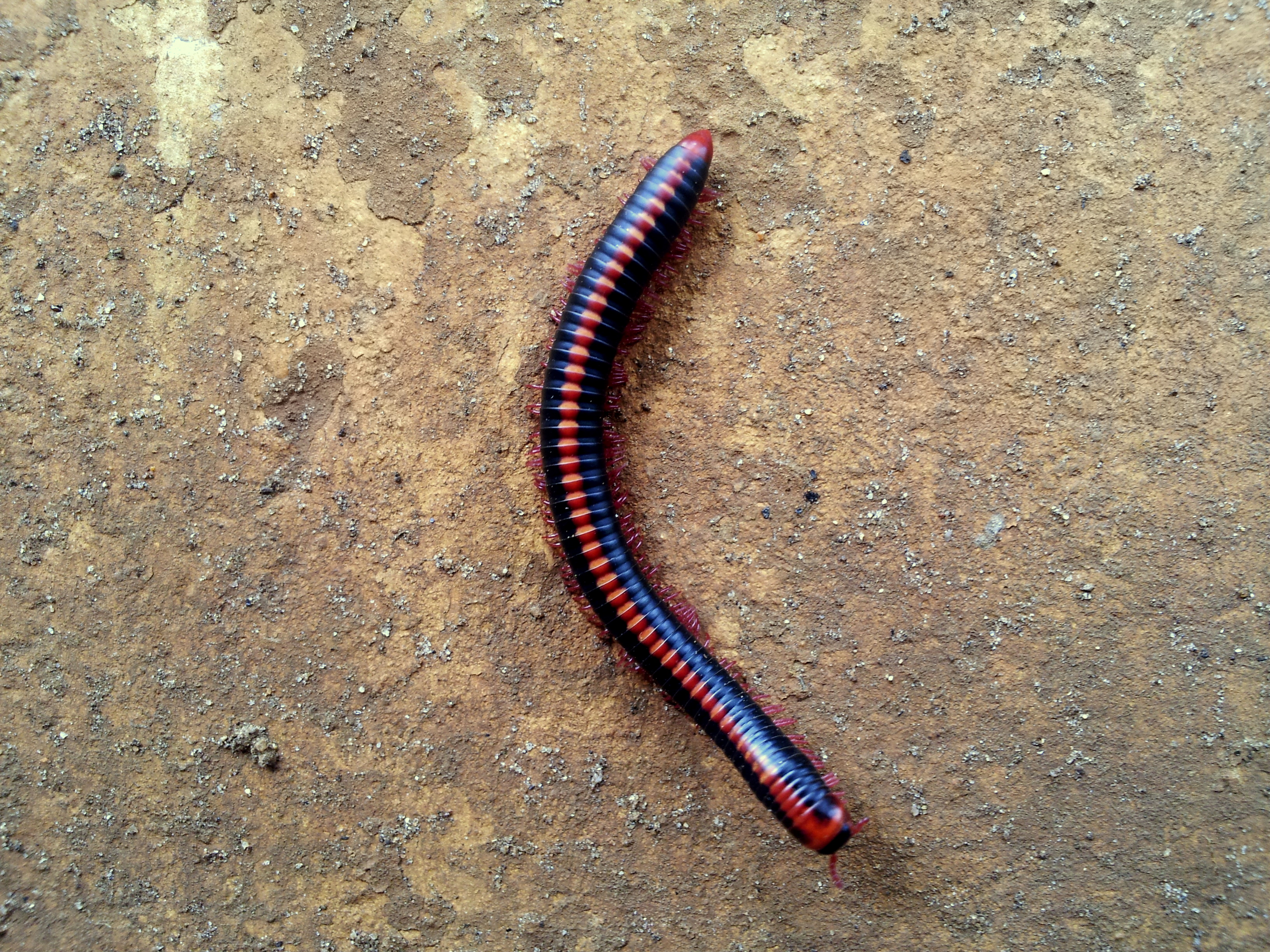

Scientific classification
- Kingdom: Animalia
- Phylum: Arthropoda
- Subphylum: Myriapoda
- Class: Diplopoda
- Order: Spirobolida
- Family: Pachybolidae
- Genus: Xenobolus
- Species: X. carnifex

Binomial name
- Xenobolus carnifex (Fabricius, 1775)

= Xenobolus carnifex =

Species of millipede

Xenobolus carnifex is a species of spirobolidan millipede found in South India and Sri Lanka. It is quite widespread throughout its range. It can become a household pest by damaging thatched roofs or raiding food and water resources. X. carnifex ranges from 58 to 65 mm (2.3 to 2.6 in) in length, with 48 to 50 body segments. The body color is dark or black, with a band of red or pink running down the dorsal midline.

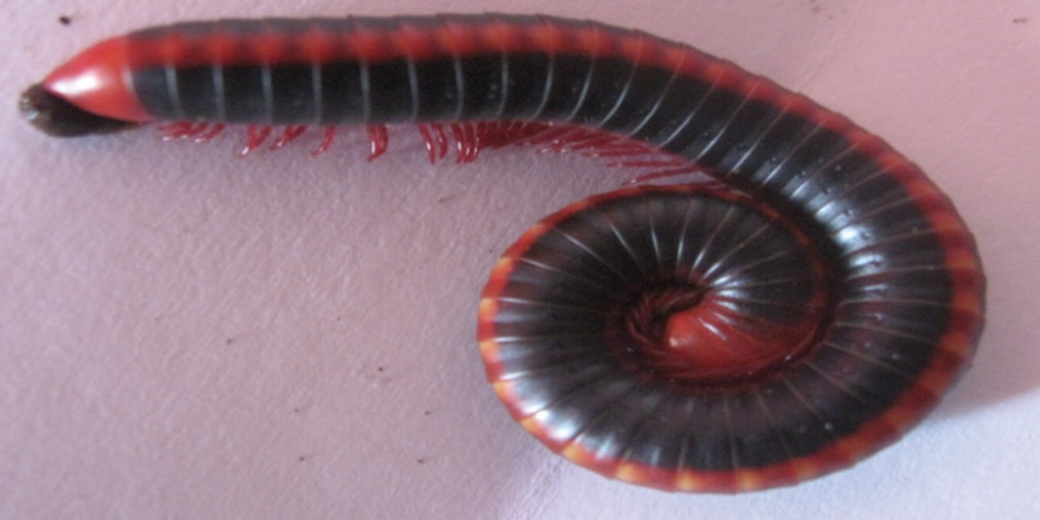
