= Crurifarcimen =

Scientific classification
- Kingdom: Animalia
- Phylum: Arthropoda
- Subphylum: Myriapoda
- Class: Diplopoda
- Order: Spirobolida
- Family: Pachybolidae
- Genus: Crurifarcimen; Enghoff, 2011
- Species: C. vagans

Binomial name
- Crurifarcimen vagans Enghoff, 2011

Genus of millipedes

Crurifarcimen is a monotypic genus of millipedes containing the single species Crurifarcimen vagans. Its common name is wandering leg sausage. This millipede is endemic to Tanzania, where it is known only from the Usambara Mountains. It was formally described in 2011 and placed in a newly erected genus of its own. It was declared one of the world's top 10 new species of 2012 by Arizona State University's International Institute for Species Exploration.

== Description ==
This millipede is made up of usually 56 (sometimes 54 to 57) ringlike abdominal segments, each with two pairs of legs, for a total of usually 112 legs. The largest specimens are about 16 centimetres (6.3 in) long. They are approximately 14–16 millimetres (0.55–0.63 in) wide. The body is light brown, sometimes darker, and the head, legs, and other parts are brownish yellow. The body segments are smooth, and the male tends to have a shinier body surface than the female.

The millipede lives in rotting wood in mountain forest habitat. The female builds a capsule-like nest roughly 8 mm (0.31 in) wide out of earth. Little else is known about the ecology of this species or others of its tribe.

Though it has been reported to be the world's largest millipede, this is erroneous, because the giant African millipede (Archispirostreptus gigas) can grow much larger, over 38 cm (15 in). It is, though, the largest millipede known from the Eastern Arc Range, a biodiversity hotspot which includes Tanzania's Usambara Mountains.

== Taxonomy ==
The name of the new genus, Crurifarcimen, can be broken down to crus (leg) and farcimen (sausage), while the species name vagans translates to "wandering" or "itinerant", hence the full name's meaning, "the itinerant sausage with feet". This inspired the simpler common name wandering leg sausage.
