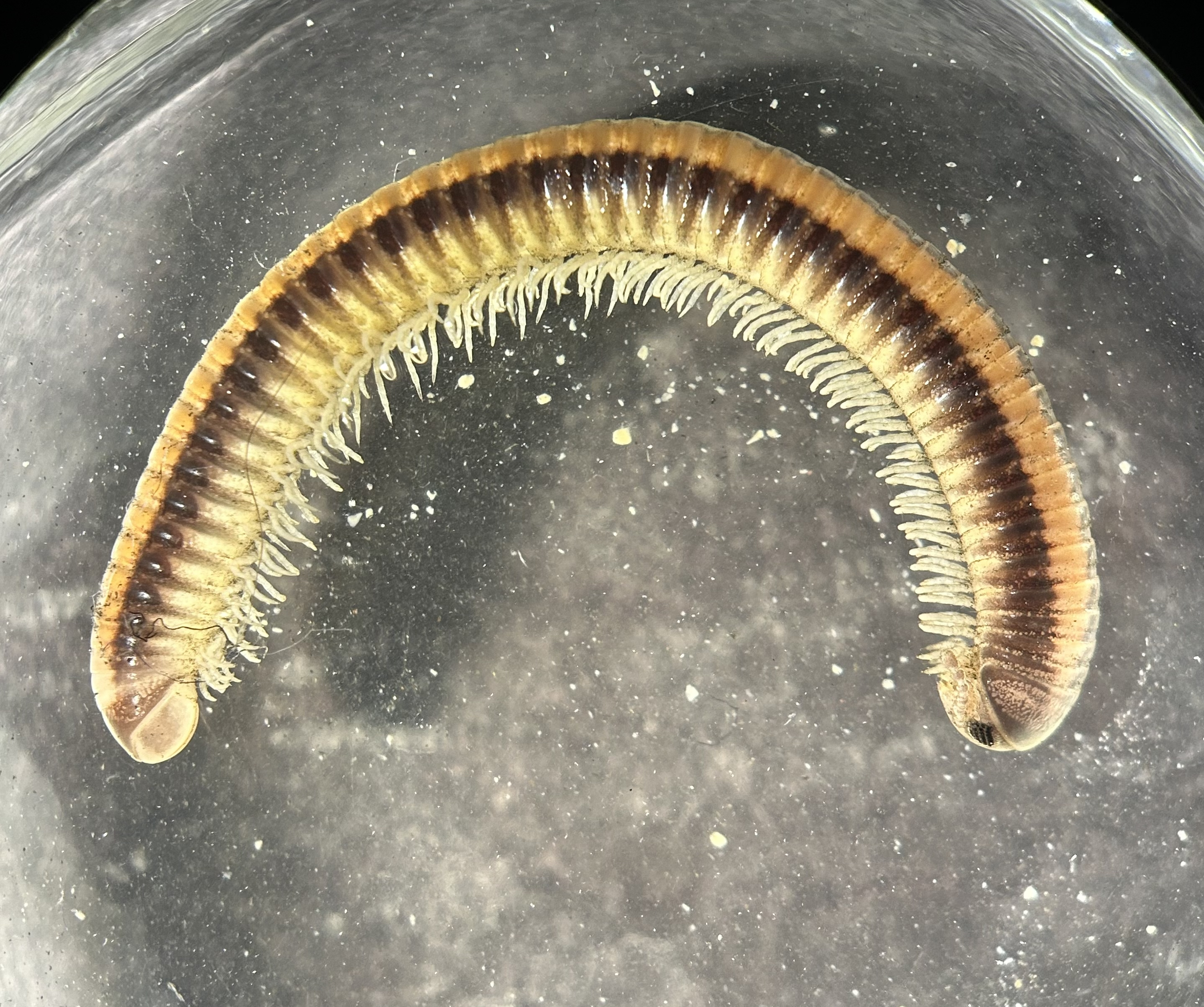

Scientific classification
- Kingdom: Animalia
- Phylum: Arthropoda
- Subphylum: Myriapoda
- Class: Diplopoda
- Order: Spirobolida
- Family: Spirobolellidae
- Genus: Spirobolellus
- Species: S. immigrans

Binomial name
- Spirobolellus immigrans (Chamberlin, 1920)

= Spirobolellus immigrans =

Australian species of millipede

Spirobolellus immigrans is a species of millipede in the family Spirobolellidae. It is found in Australia, although it was first described in California, United States of America from a specimen from staghorn fern imported from Australia.

== Description ==
According to its original description (under the name Strophobolus immigrans), Spirobolellus immigrans has an orange dorsal surface split by a narrow median black stripe. The sides of the body are black while the ventral surface is yellowish orange. The collum (first body segment) is black and in its median region has lighter areolations. The antennae are a dull fulvous colour while the legs are yellowish orange. Colouration of immatures is similar to that of adults.

An adult male specimen of this species was measured as 2 mm wide and nearly 20 mm long. An immature specimen was measured as 8.5 mm long.

== Ecology ==
Little is known about the ecology of this species, apart from the type specimen being found on an unspecified species of staghorn fern. Spirobolid millipedes in general occur in moist areas, such as leaf litter and the undersides of logs, and feed on soft parts of plants as well as decaying vegetation.

== In captivity ==
Spirobolellus immigrans (or possibly a similar species of Spirobolellus) is sold in the pet trade under names such as "Maui Skunk Stripe Millipede" and "Hawaiian Glow Millipede".
