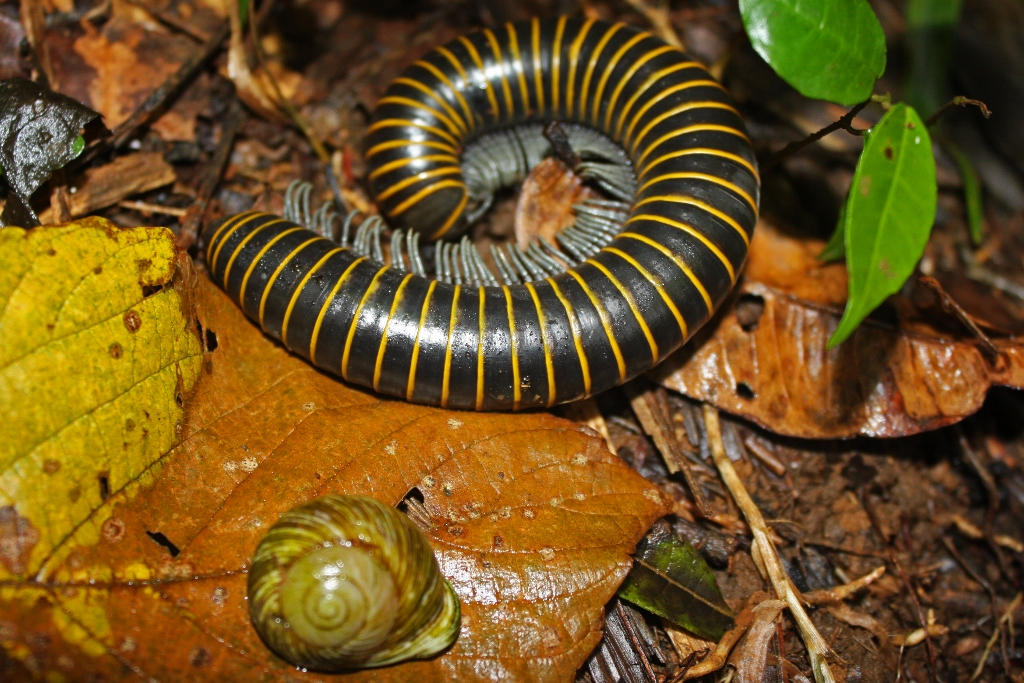
- Bumblebee or Yellow-banded millipede, Anadenobolus monilicornis

Scientific classification
- Domain: Eukaryota
- Kingdom: Animalia
- Phylum: Arthropoda
- Subphylum: Myriapoda
- Class: Diplopoda
- Order: Spirobolida
- Family: Rhinocricidae
- Genus: Anadenobolus; Silvestri, 1897

Diversity
- at least 100 species

= Anadenobolus =

Genus of millipedes

Anadenobolus is a genus of millipedes in the family Rhinocricidae. There are more than 100 described species in Anadenobolus.

== See also ==
- List of Anadenobolus species
