= Typhlobolellidae =

Scientific classification
- Domain: Eukaryota
- Kingdom: Animalia
- Phylum: Arthropoda
- Subphylum: Myriapoda
- Class: Diplopoda
- Order: Spirobolida
- Family: Typhlobolellidae

Family of millipedes

Typhlobolellidae is a family of millipedes belonging to the order Spirobolida.

Genera:

- Ergene Chamberlin, 1943
- Morelene Chamberlin, 1943
- Reddellobus Causey, 1975
- Typhlobolellus Hoffman, 1969
