= Allopocockiidae =

Scientific classification
- Domain: Eukaryota
- Kingdom: Animalia
- Phylum: Arthropoda
- Subphylum: Myriapoda
- Class: Diplopoda
- Order: Spirobolida
- Family: Allopocockiidae; Keeton, 1960

Family of millipedes

Allopocockiidae is a family of millipedes in the order Spirobolida. There are about five genera and eight described species in Allopocockiidae.

== Genera ==
- Allopocockia Brolemann, 1913
- Anelus Cook, 1911
- Arolus Chamberlin, 1922
- Chelogonobolus Carl, 1919
- Schmidtolus Chamberlin, 1953
