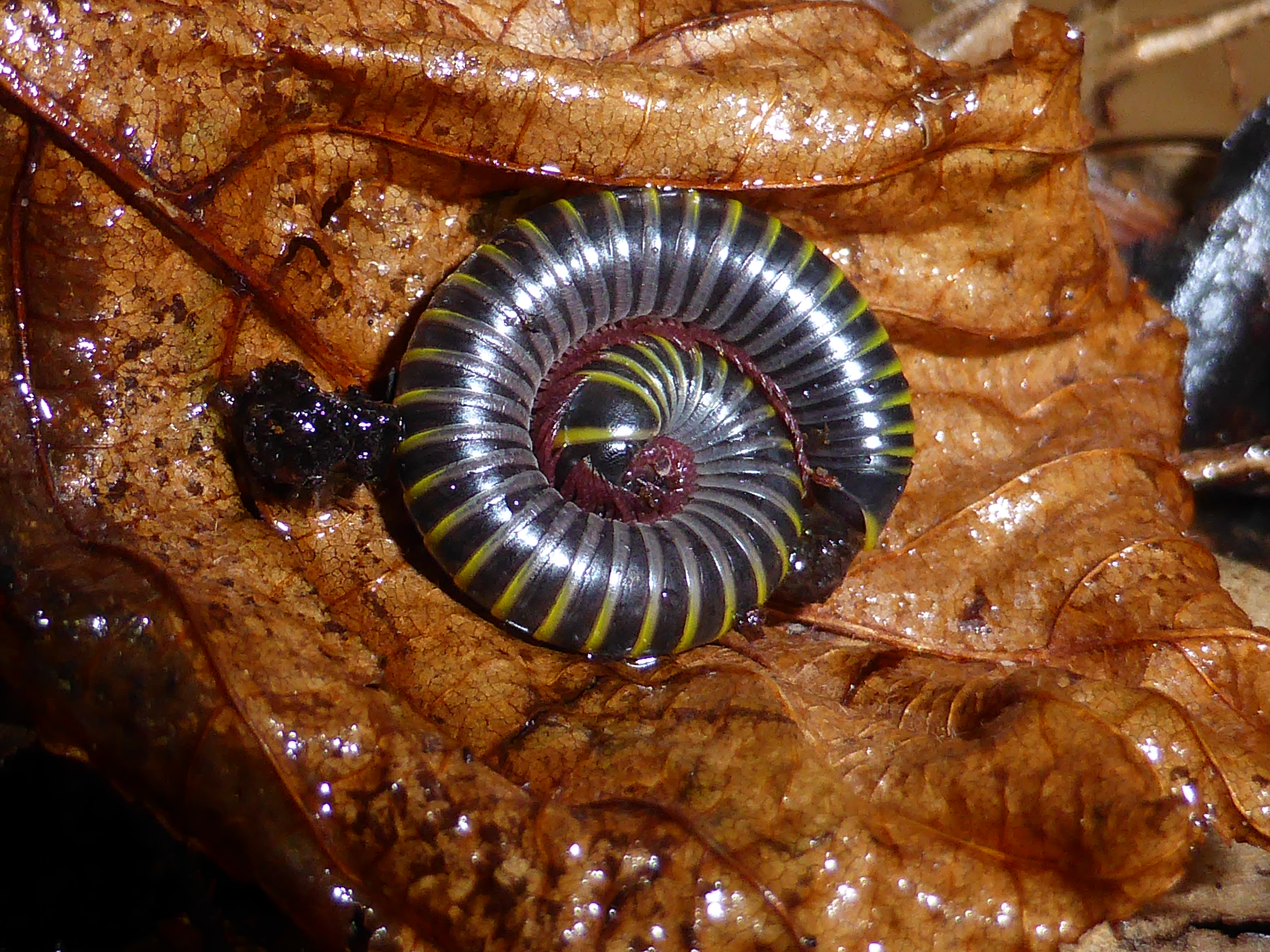
- Anadenobolus monilicornis in defensive position
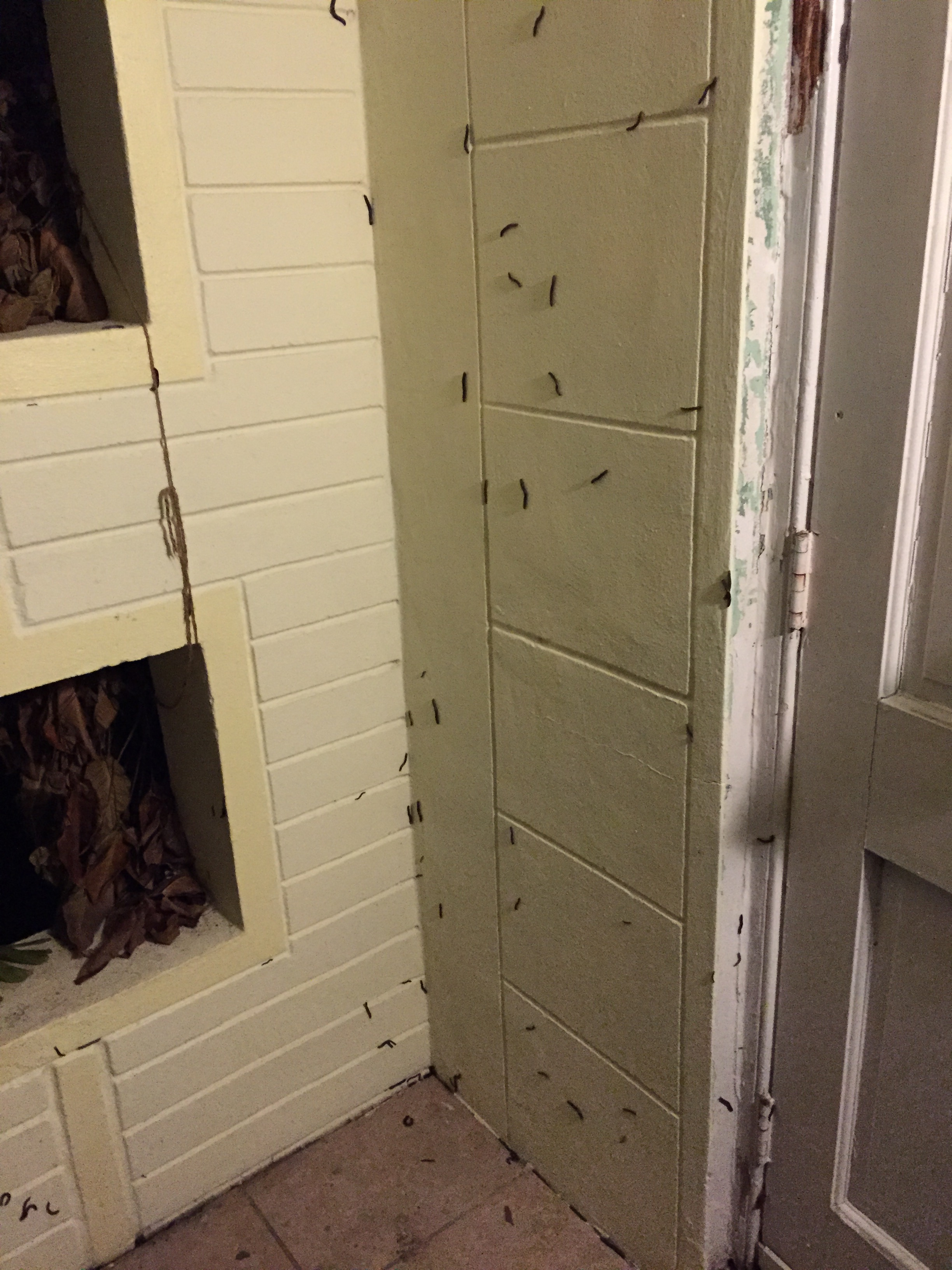
- Anadenobolus monilicornis near porch light at night in South Miami, Florida

Scientific classification
- Kingdom: Animalia
- Phylum: Arthropoda
- Subphylum: Myriapoda
- Class: Diplopoda
- Order: Spirobolida
- Family: Rhinocricidae
- Genus: Anadenobolus
- Species: A. monilicornis

Binomial name
- Anadenobolus monilicornis (von Porat, 1876)

= Anadenobolus monilicornis =

Species of millipede

Anadenobolus monilicornis, known as the yellow-banded millipede or bumblebee millipede, is a species of millipede in the family Rhinocricidae. It is native to the Caribbean and has also been introduced to the southeastern United States.

== Description ==
Individuals are dark brown with distinctive yellow bands, and measure 2.5–3 centimetres (1.0–1.2 in) long. The legs and antennae are red.

== Ecology and behaviour ==
This species inhabits leaf litter. Birds and captive monkeys have been observed crushing these millipedes and rubbing their secretions on their wings or fur, potentially to repel insects. The secretions of millipedes may have some properties that repel insects.

== Distribution ==
This species is native to the Caribbean: it is found in Brazil, Venezuela, Suriname, Guyana, and on Barbados, Trinidad and Tobago, St. Maarten, St. Kitts, Martinique, Dominica, Guadeloupe, Jamaica, Puerto Rico and Haiti.

This species has been introduced to southern Florida, where it can occur in large numbers but is not considered a pest.
