= Hoffmanobolidae =

Scientific classification
- Domain: Eukaryota
- Kingdom: Animalia
- Phylum: Arthropoda
- Subphylum: Myriapoda
- Class: Diplopoda
- Order: Spirobolida
- Family: Hoffmanobolidae

Family of millipedes

Hoffmanobolidae is a family of millipedes belonging to the order Spirobolida.

Genera:

- Hoffmanobolus Shelley, 2001
