= Messicobolidae =

Scientific classification
- Kingdom: Animalia
- Phylum: Arthropoda
- Subphylum: Myriapoda
- Class: Diplopoda
- Order: Spirobolida
- Suborder: Spirobolidea
- Family: Messicobolidae; Loomis, 1968

Genera
- Messicobolus Brolemann, 1913; Petenobolus Loomis, 1968

Family of millipedes

The family Messicobolidae is one of the smaller families of millipedes in the order Spirobolida (fewer than 30 described species). In general appearance, messicobolids are medium to large size spirobolids and are often brightly colored. Messicobolids occur in mountainous regions of Mexico, Guatemala, Honduras and El Salvador. Oak/pine forest and montane rain forest are the typical habitats in these environments and messicobolids are generally associated with decomposing logs and leaf litter of broad-leaved trees.
