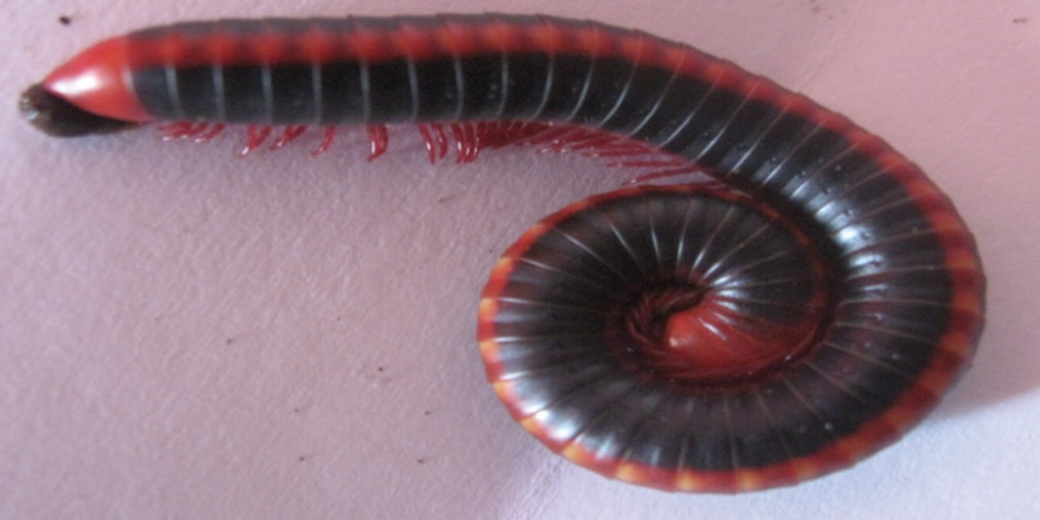
- Xenobolus carnifex

Scientific classification
- Domain: Eukaryota
- Kingdom: Animalia
- Phylum: Arthropoda
- Subphylum: Myriapoda
- Class: Diplopoda
- Order: Spirobolida
- Family: Pachybolidae; Cook, 1897

Diversity
- c. 49 genera, species

Synonyms
- Atopochetidae Attems, 1953

= Pachybolidae =

Family of millipedes

Pachybolidae is a family of round-backed millipedes of the order Spirobolida. The family includes 49 different genera. Two subfamilies are recognized.

== Subfamilies ==
- Pachybolinae
- Spiromiminae

== Genera ==
- Alluviobolus
- Aphistogoniulus
- Atlanticobolus
- Atopochetus
- Aulacobolus
- Brachyspirobolus
- Caprobolus
- Centrobolus
- Colossobolus
- Corallobolus
- Crurifarcimen
- Dactylobolus
- Dekanbolus
- Dichromatobolus
- Epibolus
- Epitrigoniulus
- Erythroprosopon
- Eucentrobolus
- Flagellobolus
- Gabolus
- Granitobolus
- Hadrobolus
- Hyperbolus
- Komphobolus
- Litostrophus
- Madabolus
- Metiche
- Microbolus
- Mystalides
- Neptunobolus
- Ostinobolus
- Pachybolus
- Parabolus
- Pelmatojulus
- Pseudocentrobolus
- Riotintobolus
- Sanguinobolus
- Spiromanes
- Spiromimus
- Stenobolus
- Titsonobolus
- Tonkinbolus
- Trachelomegalus
- Xenobolus
- Zehntnerobolus
