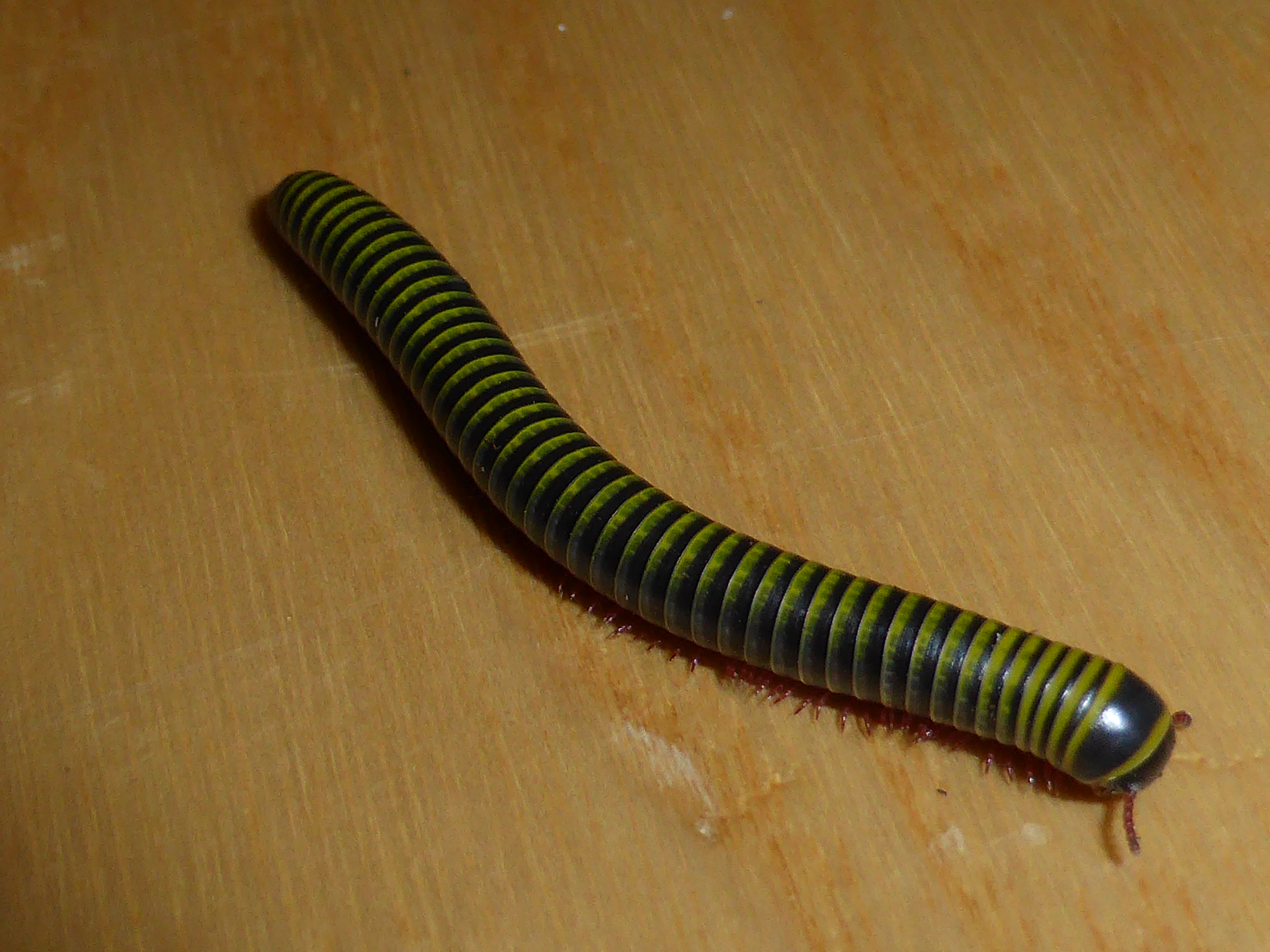
- Anadenobolus monilicornis

Scientific classification
- Kingdom: Animalia
- Phylum: Arthropoda
- Subphylum: Myriapoda
- Class: Diplopoda
- Order: Spirobolida
- Suborder: Rhinocricidea; Brölemann, 1913
- Family: Rhinocricidae; Brölemann, 1913

= Rhinocricidae =

Family of millipedes

Rhinocricidae is a family of millipedes, that occurs disjunctly in Malesia and neighbouring parts of Australasia and in the Neotropics. The family contains the following genera:

- Acladocricus Brölemann, 1913
- Alcimobolus Loomis, 1936
- Anadenobolus von Porat, 1876
- Andocricus Chamberlin, 1955
- Auracricus Pérez-Asso, 1998
- Australocricus Jeekel, 2001
- Carlocricus Jeekel, 2001
- Cubobolus Chamberlin, 1918
- Desmocricus Carl, 1918
- Eurhinocricus Brölemann, 1903
- Fomentocricus Perez-Asso, 1998
- Haitobolus Mauriès & Hoffman, 1998
- Jobocricus Pérez-Asso, 1998
- Leiocricus Loomis, 1936
- Lissocricus Chamberlin, 1953
- Metacricus Chamberlin, 1953
- Neocricus Chamberlin, 1941
- Nesobolus Chamberlin, 1918
- Oxypyge Silvestri, 1896
- Perucricus Kraus, 1954
- Poecilocricus Schubart, 1962
- Proporobolus Silvestri, 1897
- Rhinocricus Karsch, 1881
- Rhytidocricus Hoffman & Keeton, 1960
- Salpidobolus Silvestri, 1897
- Thyroproctus Pocock, 1894
- Yucatobolus Chamberlin, 1938
