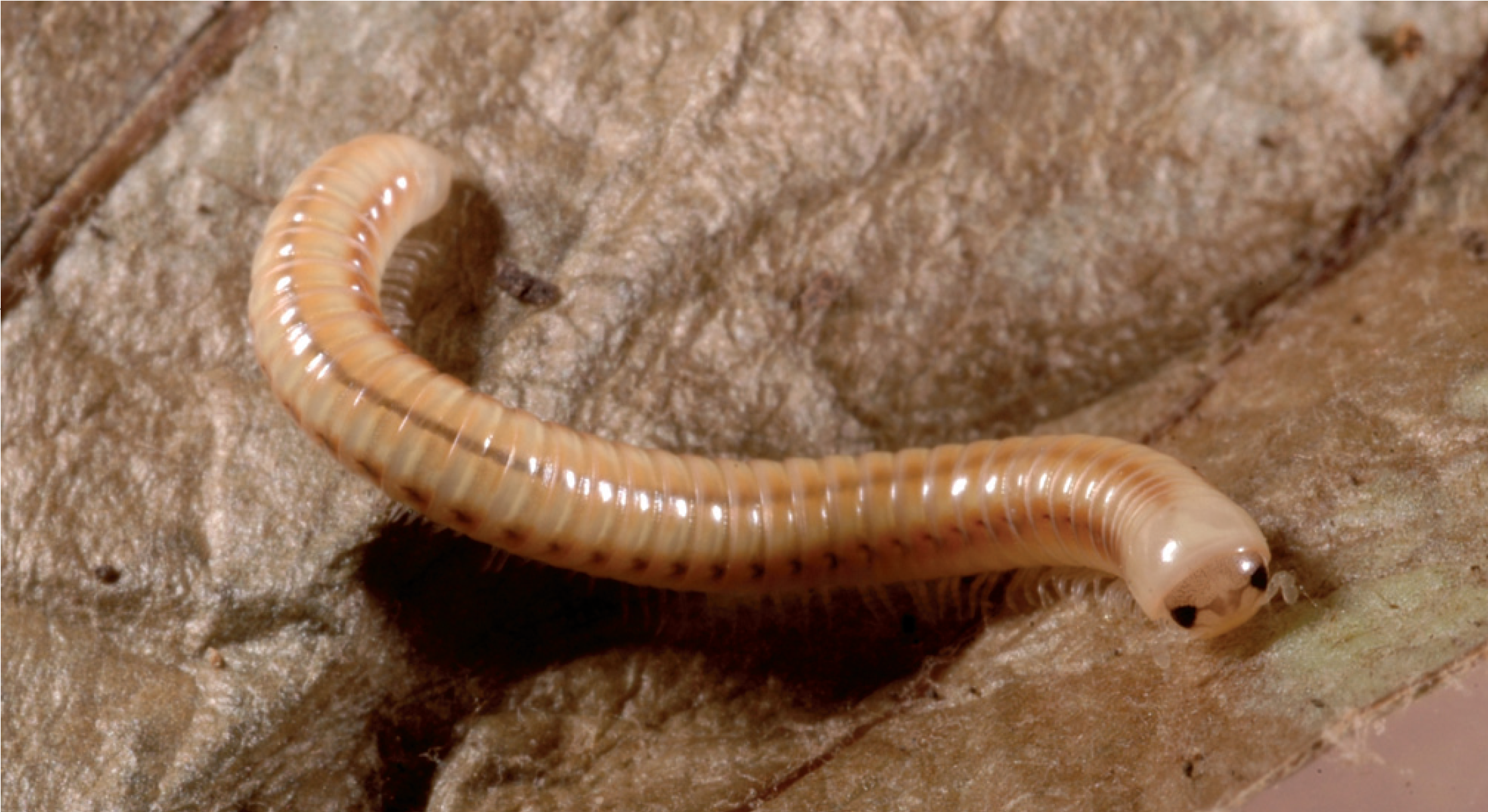
- Paraspirobolus lucifugus, Okinawa

Scientific classification
- Kingdom: Animalia
- Phylum: Arthropoda
- Subphylum: Myriapoda
- Class: Diplopoda
- Order: Spirobolida
- Family: Spirobolellidae; Brolemann, 1913

= Spirobolellidae =

Family of millipedes

Spirobolellidae is a family of millipedes in the order Spirobolida. There are about 11 genera and more than 100 described species in Spirobolellidae.

== Genera ==
These 11 genera belong to the family Spirobolellidae:

- Attemsobolus
- Desmocricellus Attems, 1953
- Howeobolus
- Hylekobolus Wesener, 2009
- Paraspirobolus Brölemann, 1902
- Physobolus Attems, 1936
- Poratobolus
- Queenslandobolus
- Spirobolellus Pocock, 1894
- Strophobolus
- Walesbolus Verhoeff, 1928

== Gallery ==
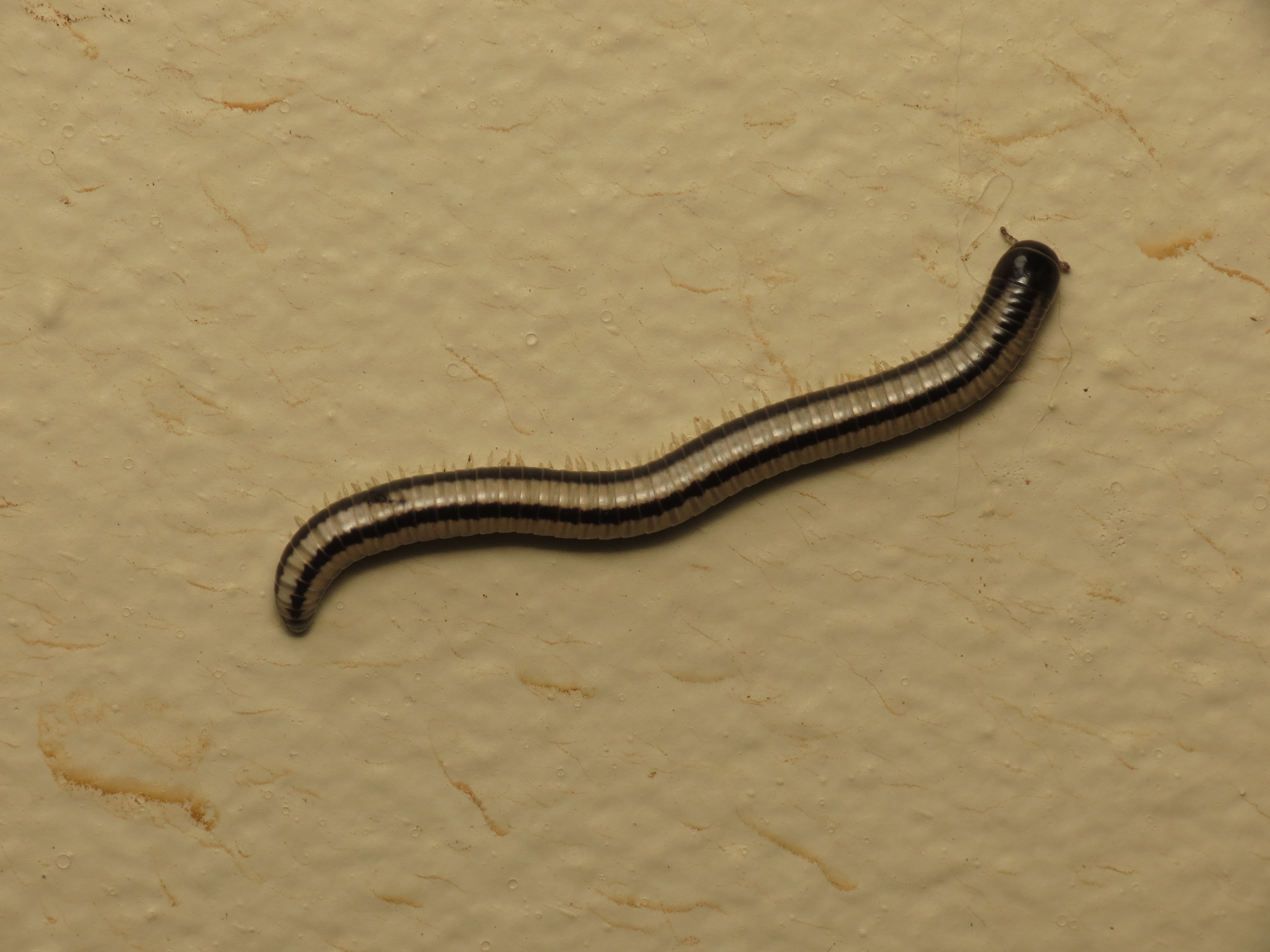
Spirobolellus sp.

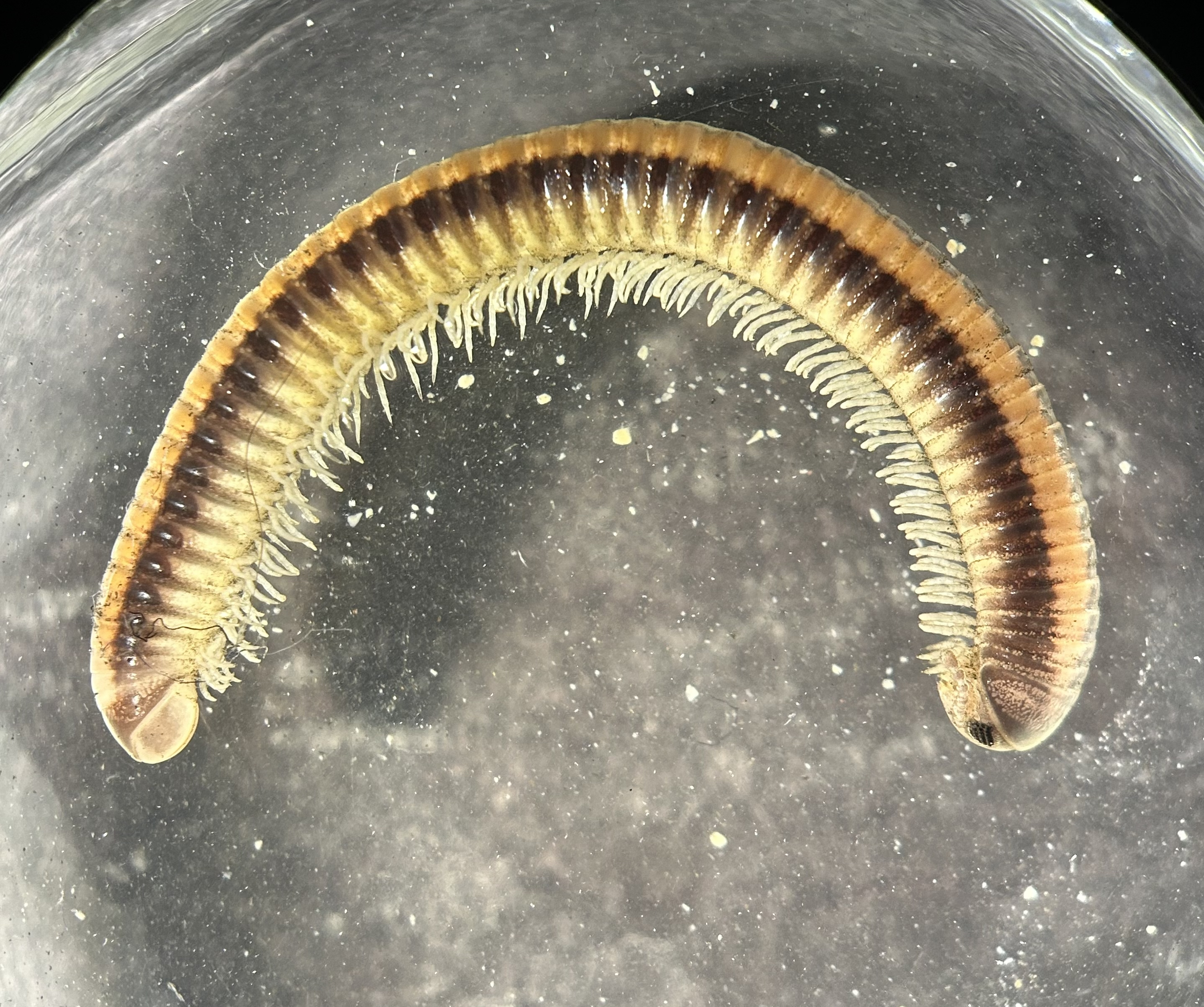
Spirobolellus immigrans in ethanol
