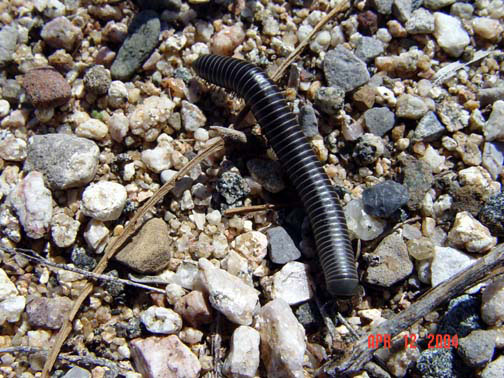
- Comanchelus chihuanus

Scientific classification
- Kingdom: Animalia
- Phylum: Arthropoda
- Subphylum: Myriapoda
- Class: Diplopoda
- Order: Spirobolida
- Family: Atopetholidae; Chamberlin, 1918

= Atopetholidae =

Family of millipedes

Atopetholidae is a family of millipedes in the order Spirobolida. There are about 18 genera and at least 60 described species in Atopetholidae.

== Genera ==
- Anelus Cook, 1911
- Arinolus Chamberlin, 1940
- Atopetholus Chamberlin, 1918
- Centrelus Cook, 1911
- Comanchelus Hoffman & Orcutt, 1960
- Cyclothyrophorus Pocock, 1908
- Eurelus Chamberlin, 1941
- Hesperolus
- Mannobolus Loomis, 1968
- Onychelus Cook, 1904
- Piedolus Chamberlin, 1930
- Saussurobolus
- Scobinomus Loomis, 1953
- Tarascolus Chamberlin, 1943
- Tidolus Chamberlin, 1949
- Toltecolus Chamberlin, 1943
- Uvaldia Loomis, 1968
- Watichelus Chamberlin, 1949
