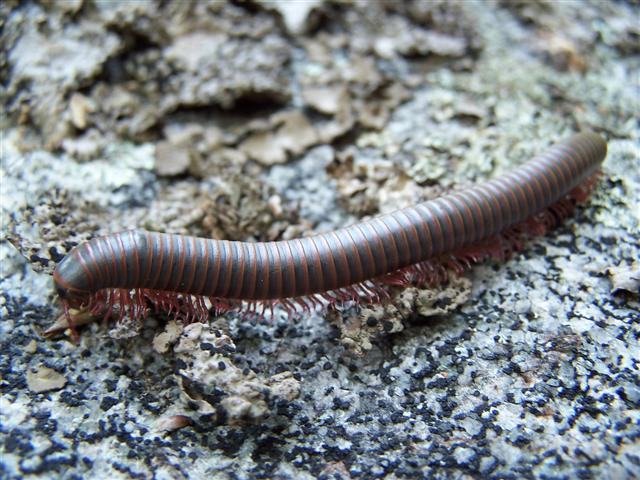
- Narceus americanus (Spirobolidae)

Scientific classification
- Kingdom: Animalia
- Phylum: Arthropoda
- Subphylum: Myriapoda
- Class: Diplopoda
- Superorder: Juliformia
- Order: Spirobolida; Bollman, 1893

Families
- 12: See text

Synonyms
- Anocheta Cook, 1895; Haplogonophora Brolemann, 1931

= Spirobolida =

Order of millipedes

Spirobolida is an order of "round-backed" millipedes containing approximately 500 species in 12 families. Its members are distinguished by the presence of a "pronounced suture that runs "vertically down the front of the head". Most of the species live in the tropics, and many are brightly coloured. Mature males have two pairs of modified legs, the gonopods, consisting of the eighth and ninth leg pairs: the posterior gonopods are used in sperm-transfer while the anterior gonopods are fused into a single plate-like structure.

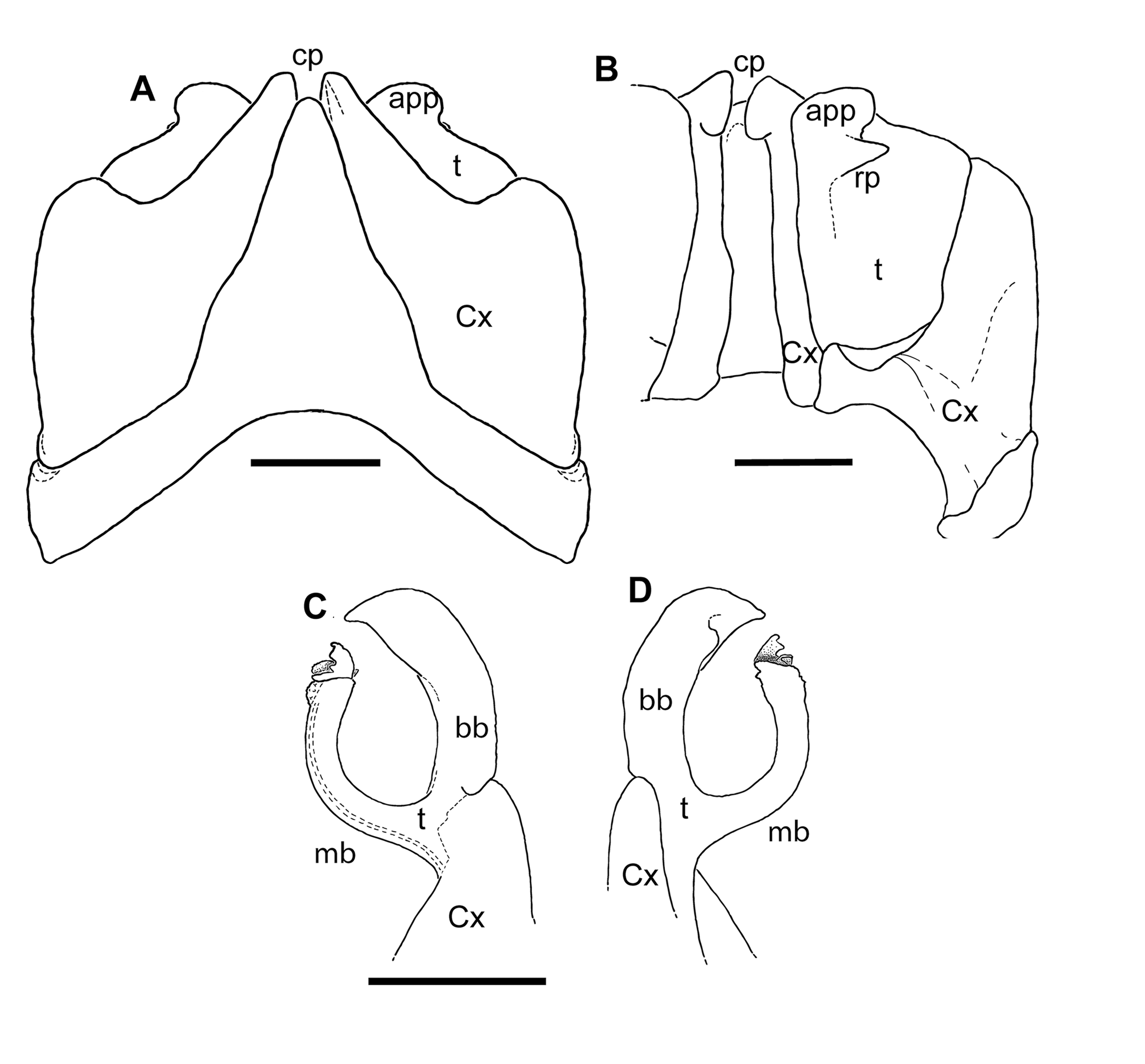
Front and rear views of the anterior (A, B) and posterior left (C, D) gonopods of a spirobolidan

The families are divided into two suborders:

Suborder Spirobolidea

- Allopocockiidae
- Atopetholidae
- Floridobolidae
- Hoffmanobolidae
- Messicobolidae
- Pseudospirobolellidae
- Rhinocricidae
- Spirobolellidae
- Spirobolidae
- Typhlobolellidae

Suborder Trigoniulidea

- Pachybolidae
- Trigoniulidae

== Select species ==
- Narceus americanus, a commonly seen species in eastern North America
- Crurifarcimen vagans, the "wandering leg sausage"
- Anadenobolus monilicornis, the yellow-banded millipede
- Eucarlia, a genus of threatened Indo-Pacific millipedes

== Gallery ==
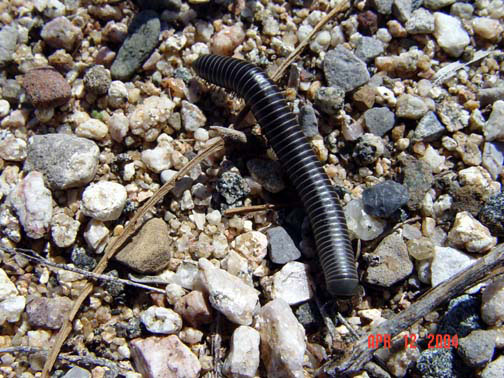
Comanchelus chihuanus (Atopetholidae)

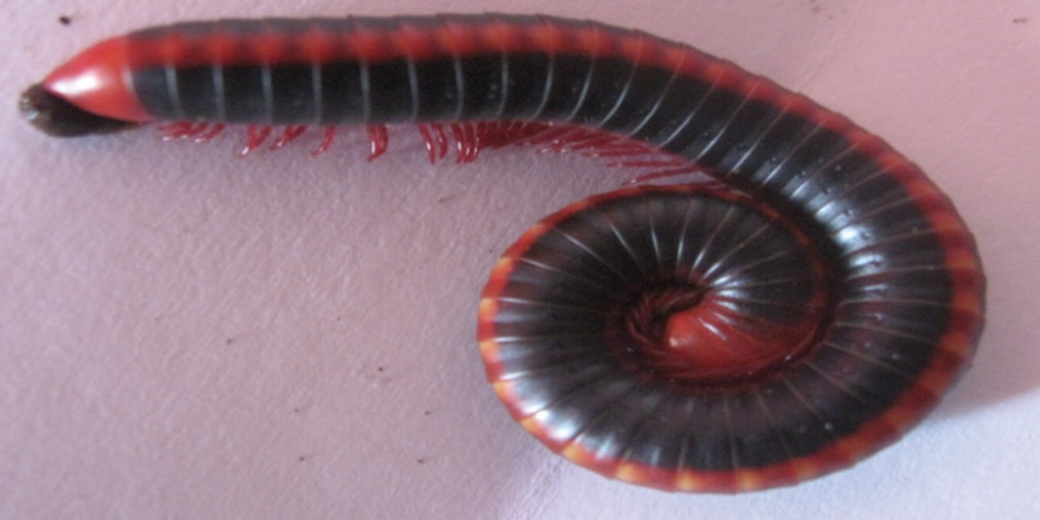
Xenobolus carnifex (Pachybolidae)

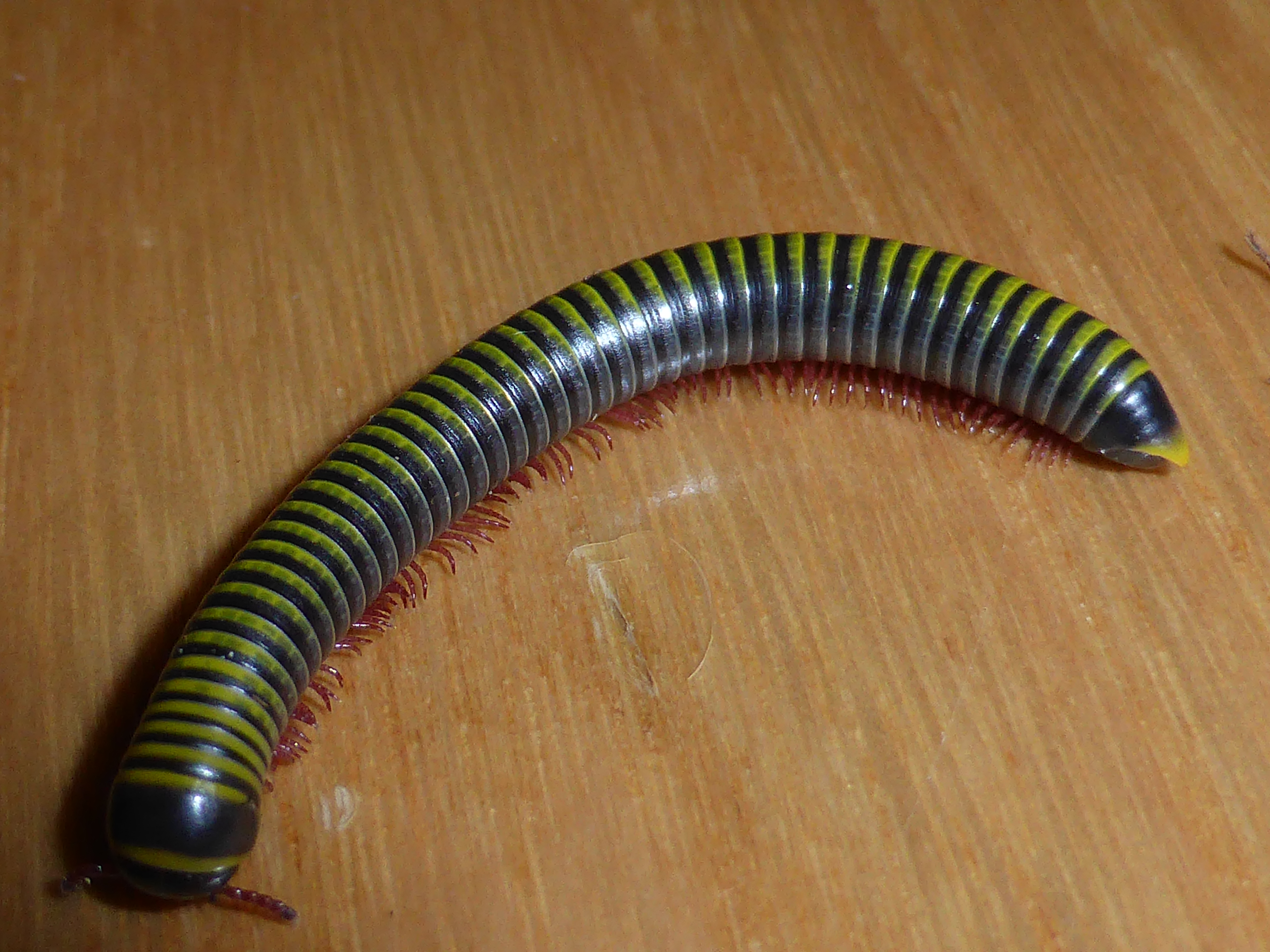
Anadenobolus monilicornis (Rhinocricidae)

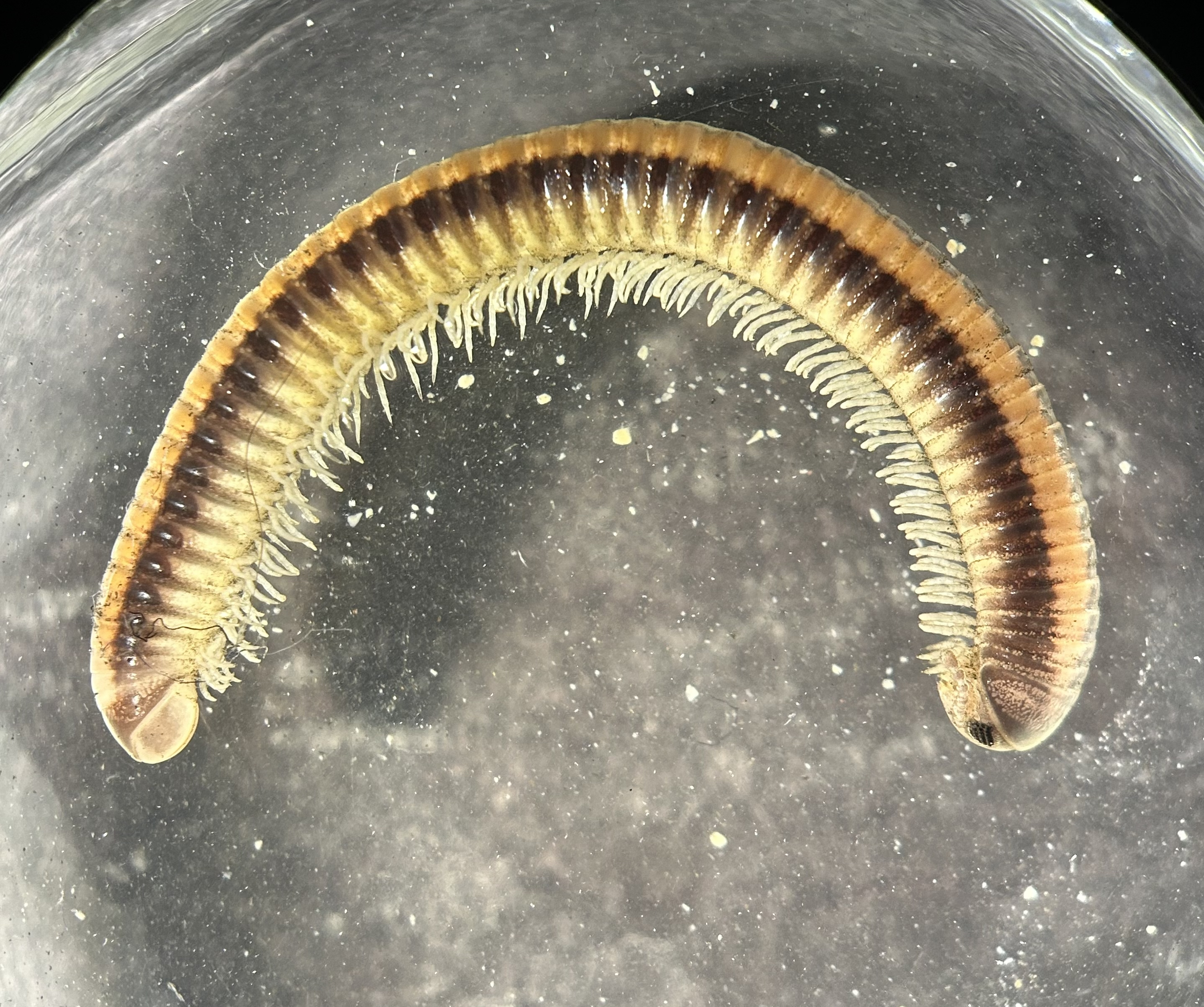
Spirobolellus immigrans (Spirobolellidae) in ethanol
