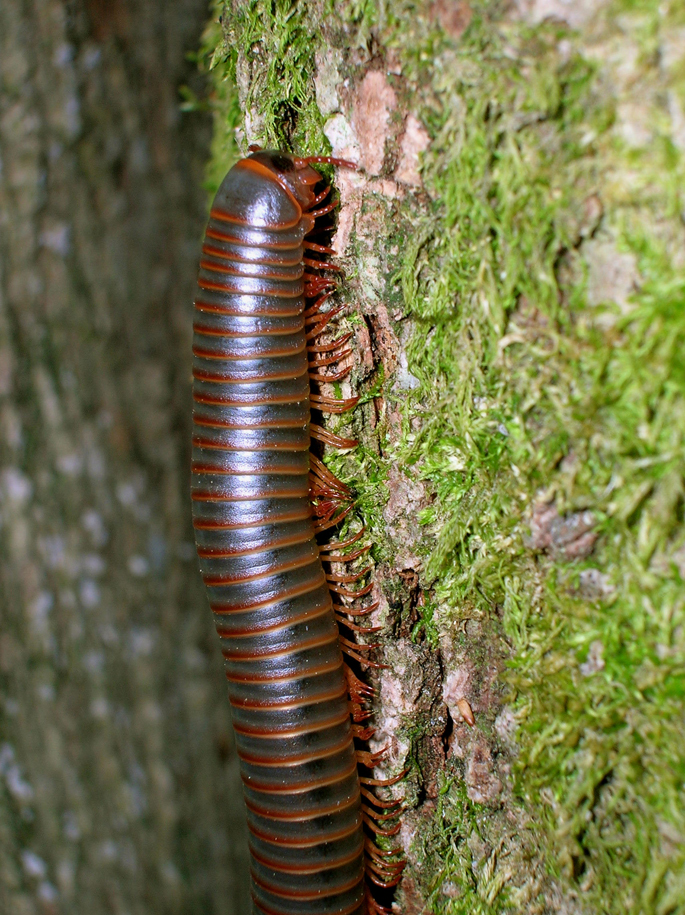

Scientific classification
- Kingdom: Animalia
- Phylum: Arthropoda
- Subphylum: Myriapoda
- Class: Diplopoda
- Order: Spirobolida
- Family: Spirobolidae
- Genus: Narceus
- Species: N. americanus

Binomial name
- Narceus americanus (Palisot de Beauvois, 1817)

= Narceus americanus =

Species of millipede

Narceus americanus is a large millipede of eastern North America. Common names include American giant millipede, worm millipede, and iron worm. It inhabits the eastern seaboard of North America west to Georgetown, Texas, north of the Ottine wetlands. It has a nearly cylindrical body, reaching a length of 4 inches (100 mm). They can be commonly found in or under decaying logs from March to October. When threatened, they sometimes curl up or release a noxious liquid that contains large amounts of benzoquinones which can cause dermatological burns. This fluid may irritate eyes or skin. Many other millipedes secrete hydrogen cyanide, and while there have also been claims that N. americanus releases hydrogen cyanide, they are unsubstantiated. They do, however, excrete a substance that causes a temporary, non-harmful discoloration of the skin known as millipede burn.

== Ecology and behavior ==
=== Diet ===
N. americanus are detritivores, primarily consuming decaying wood and leaf litter. They have also been found to feed on deer scat and fresh fruit, preferring these to their typical diet when given the choice, although it is not as nutritious to them as their regular diet. Most feeding activity occurs at night.

=== Behavior ===
Though capable of releasing irritating and foul-smelling liquid from ozopores when aggressively disturbed, they can typically be safely handled by humans and are not uncommon on the arthropod pet market.

Their cuticle is somewhat water permeable, so they seek out damp or humid environments and have exhibited specific behaviors in response to desiccation stress. If exposed to a dry or actively desiccating environment, they will first expend energy trying to find a more favorable environment, and if this fails they reflexively curl into the typical defensive position. This position closes spiracles located at the base of legs, preventing further water loss. From a partially dehydrated state they can reabsorb moisture from high-humidity air, but moisture-rich food is necessary for complete recovery to a fully hydrated state. Molting while burrowed into the ground or into rotting wood can also be a response to chronic dehydrating conditions.

==== Burrowing ====
Burrowing is initiated by the millipede picking up sediment grains with its mandibles and using legs to pass them along its body segments, where the sediment is then deposited at the posterior end of the body. This process from start to finish can take anywhere between five and sixty minutes, depending on the size of the burrow and qualities of the soil.

Burrows can be used as temporary or more permanent dwellings, and are used to escape dry or cold surface conditions. Millipedes will typically spend non-feeding time in their burrows, which is why they are difficult to find during the day. Molting is almost exclusively done in burrows.

=== Susceptibility to predation ===
In some regions Narceus americanus seems to be subject to predation by an as yet unidentified organism that eats the head and the first few segments of the body, discarding the rest of the carcase. This seems to happen mainly, if not exclusively, on Tuckernuck Island. The observation is interpreted as reflecting the fact that some predator has discovered that only the anterior part of the animal is non-toxic. Proposed perpetrators include voles and eastern towhee.

== Reproduction ==
The average lifespan of these millipedes is unknown, but they can live up to eleven years in captivity or in the wild. Sexual maturity is not reached until 1–2 years of age.

Mating occurs at the beginning of spring through to early summer. Males mate via transfer of a spermatophore, and females are able to store this sperm to fertilize eggs at a later time. Other millipede species may lay 20–300 eggs, but N. americanus lay just one egg in a nest made of chewed leaf litter and excrement. The female millipede will wrap herself around the egg and nest until it hatches several weeks later, producing a millipede with seven body segments and only three leg pairs. The number of body segments and leg pairs are increased with each molting, and there is no parental investment after egg hatching.

== Color Morphs ==
Narceus Americanus is most shown in photographs as being dark brown with reddish rings, but it can come in a variety of different colors. This includes colors such as gray, brown, and tan.

== Photos ==
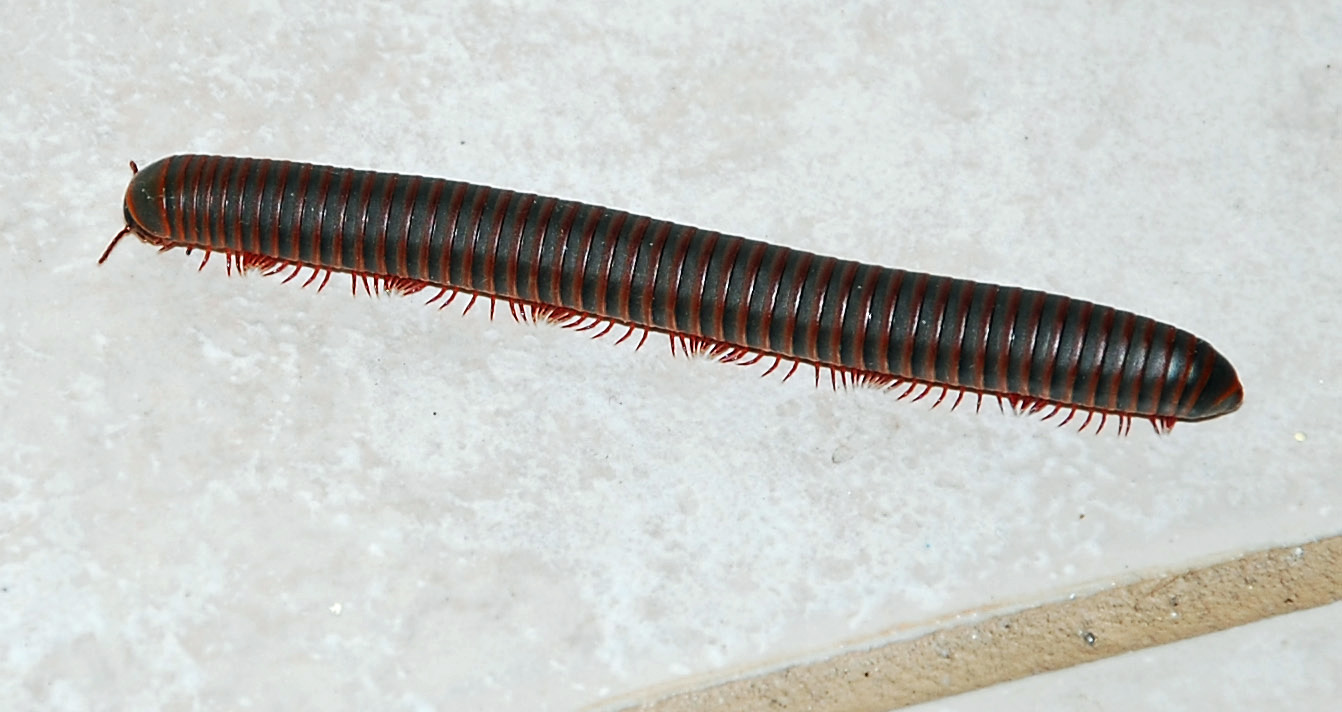
On floor, note waves of legs

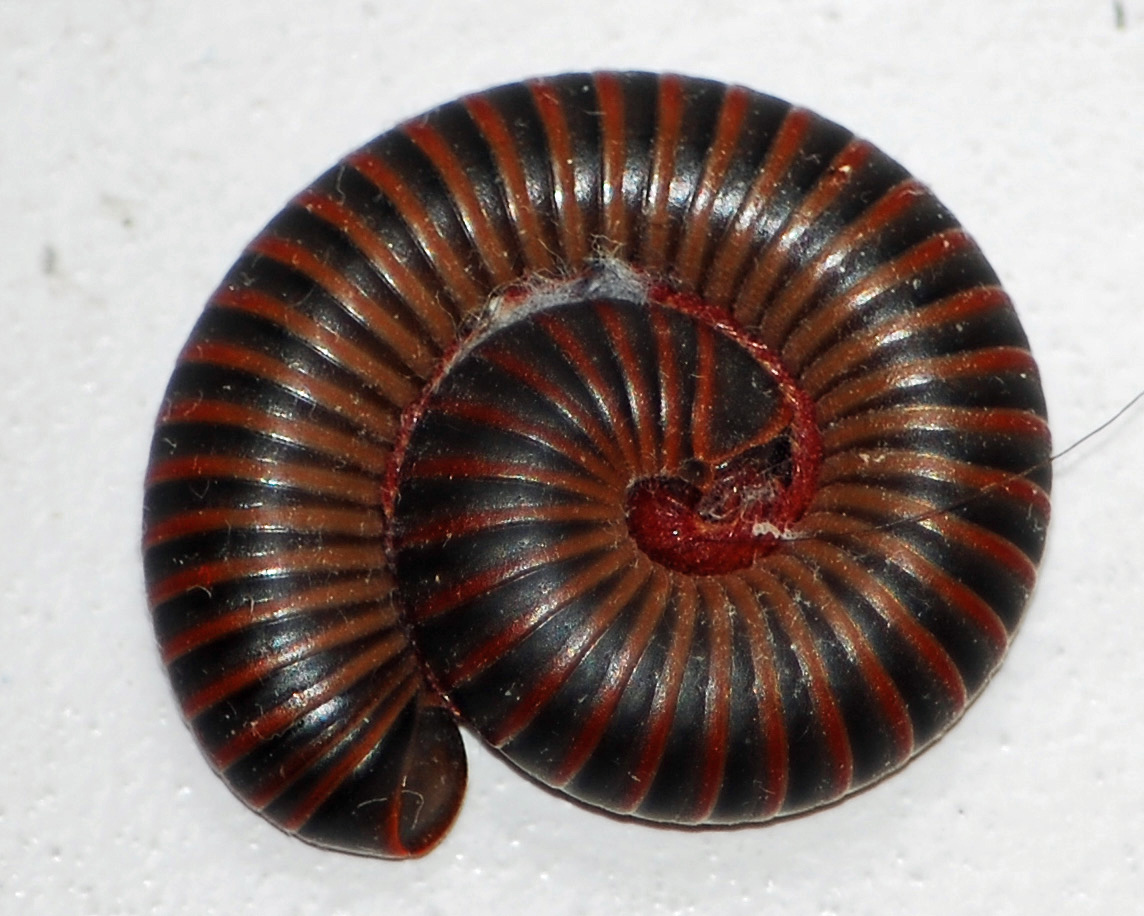
Curled in defensive position

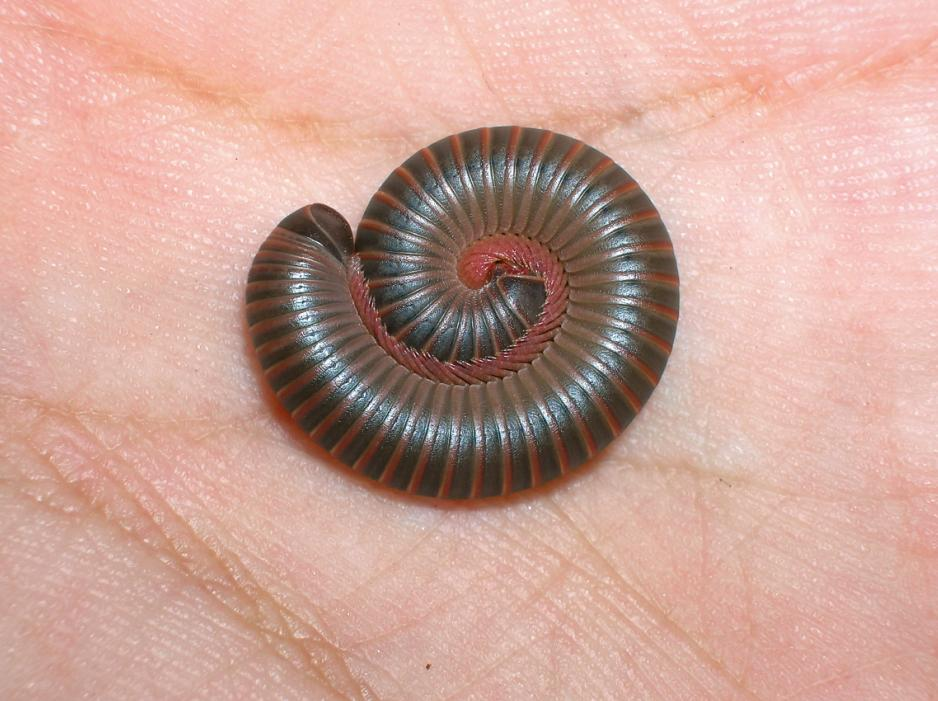
Defensive position

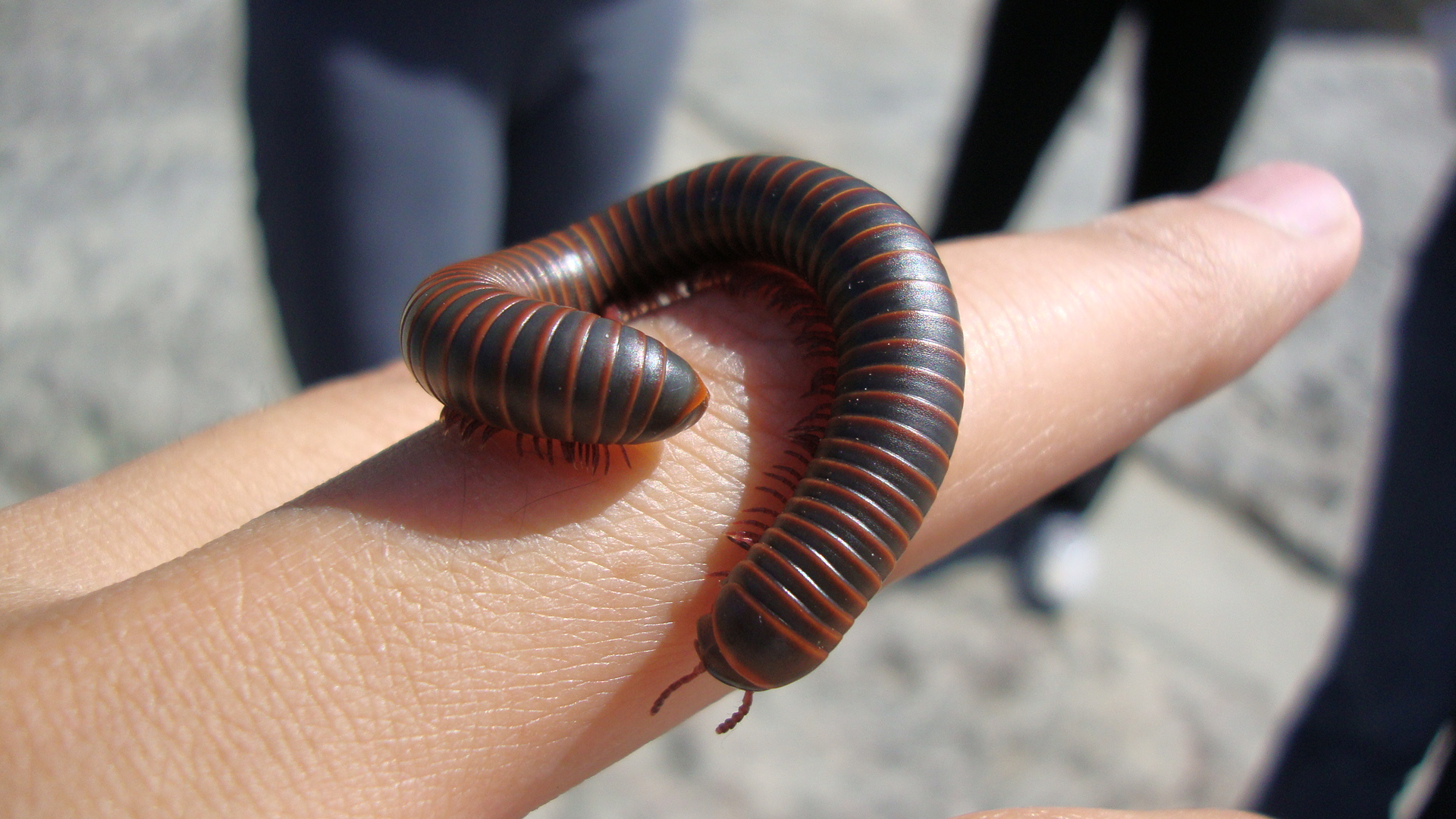
On a finger

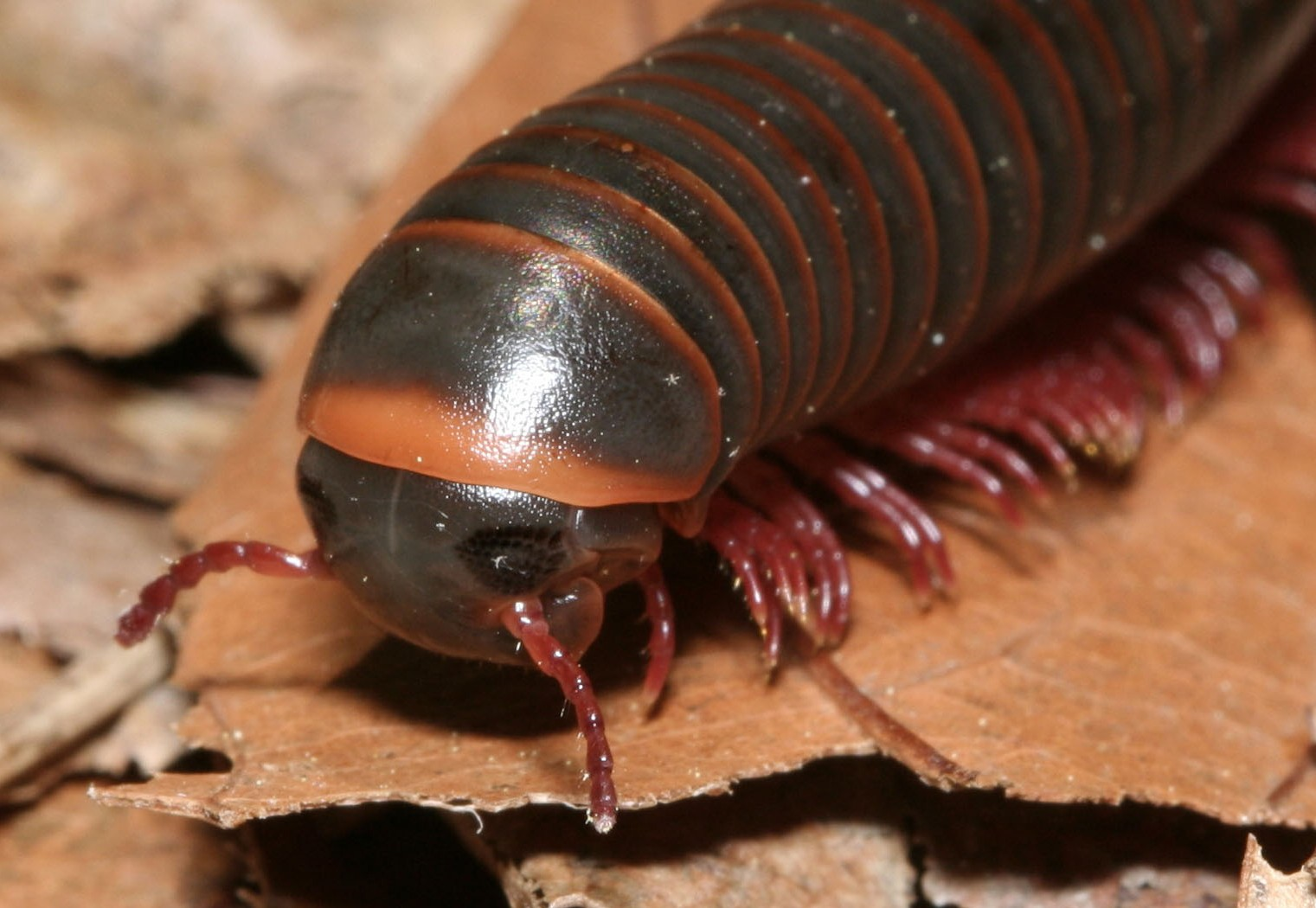
Closeup of the head

== See also ==
- Tylobolus, a similar-looking genus in the Western U.S.
- Narceus gordanus, a member of the same genus
