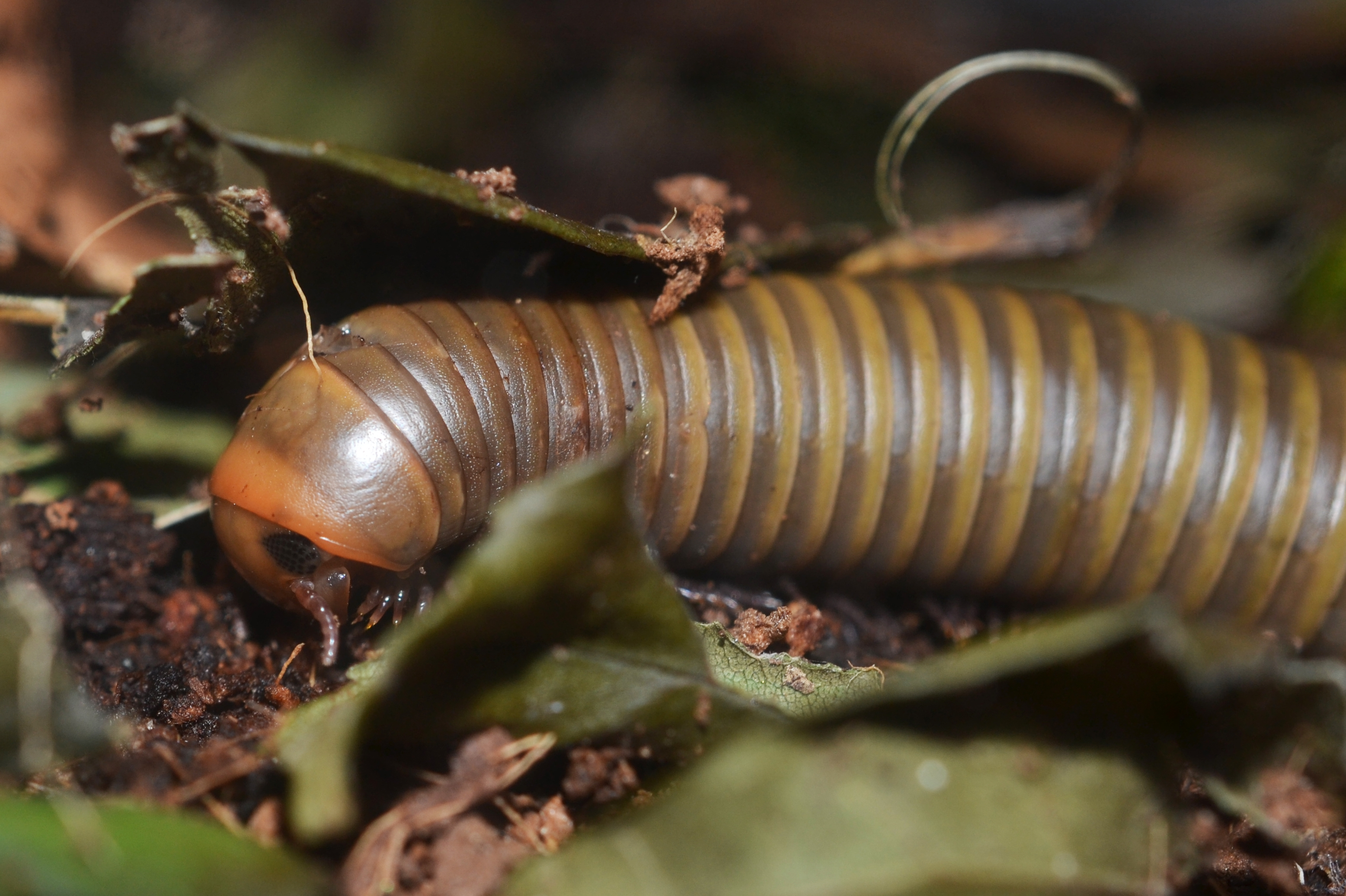

Scientific classification
- Kingdom: Animalia
- Phylum: Arthropoda
- Subphylum: Myriapoda
- Class: Diplopoda
- Order: Spirobolida
- Family: Spirobolidae
- Genus: Narceus
- Species: N. gordanus

Binomial name
- Narceus gordanus (Chamberlin, 1943)

Synonyms
- Spirobolus gordanus Chamberlin, 1943; Arctobolus keysi Loomis, 1944; Narceus keysi Causey, 1955

= Narceus gordanus =

Species of millipede

Narceus gordanus, also known as smokey oak millipede and smokey ghost millipede, is a species of spirobolid millipede native to the south-eastern United States. Adults range from around 60 to 120 mm (2.4 to 4.7 in) in length, up to 13 mm wide, and possess 45 to 65 body segments. The body color is lighter than other species of the genus Narceus, with each body ring a light greenish tan followed by a band of darker tan. N. gordanus also has shorter legs than other Narceus species, and a deeper groove on the head in which the antennae rest.

Narceus gordanus occurs in Florida scrub habitat of peninsular Florida, and ranges as far north as South Carolina, with possible records in Tennessee. N. gordanus matches the color of sand in some Florida habitats, even though it is mainly active at night. Narceus gordanus, similar to other millipedes, responds to threats by secreting a foul-smelling and tasting fluid and coiling into a defensive spiral to protect its underbelly and head. When exposed to human skin, these secretions can cause a harmless discoloration known as millipede burn. Their diet consists of decaying leaves, wood, and other detritus.

== Photos ==
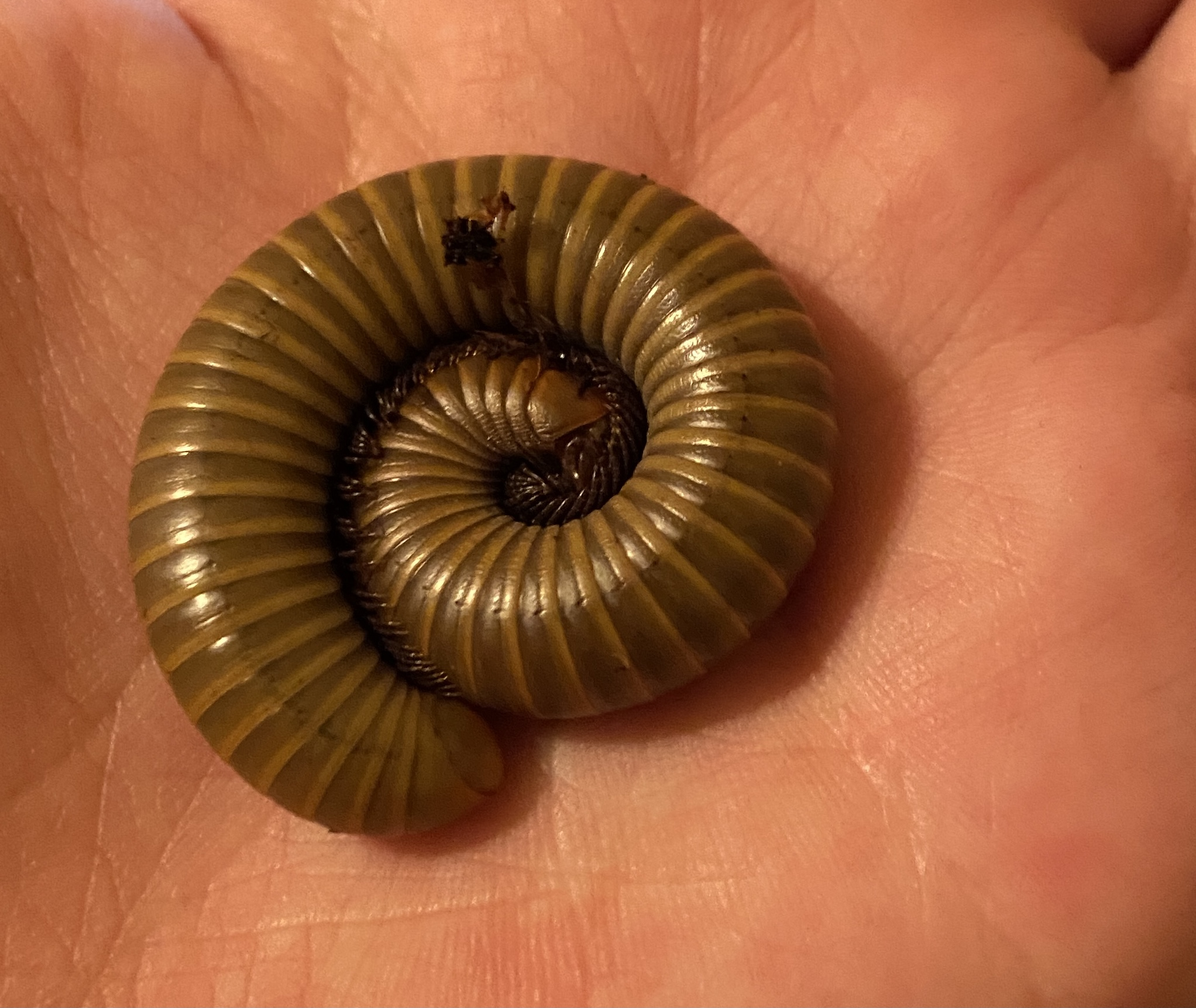
Curled in a defensive spiral

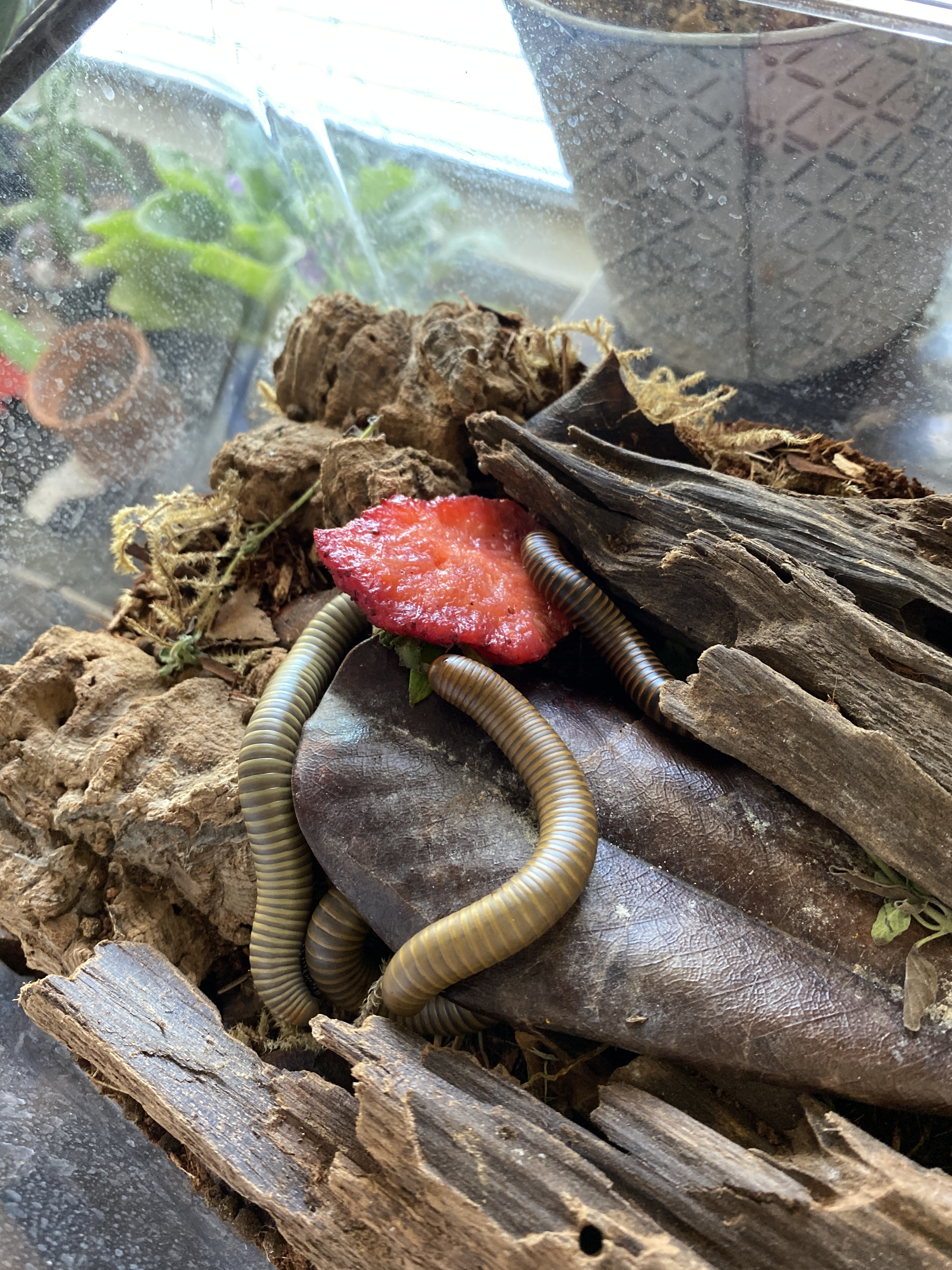
N. gordanus and N. americanus eating a strawberry
