= Hiltonius pulchrus =

Scientific classification
- Kingdom: Animalia
- Phylum: Arthropoda
- Subphylum: Myriapoda
- Class: Diplopoda
- Order: Spirobolida
- Family: Spirobolidae
- Genus: Hiltonius
- Species: H. pulchrus

Binomial name
- Hiltonius pulchrus Chamberlin, 1918

Species of millipede

Hiltonius pulchrus is a species of millipede in the family Spirobolidae, endemic to the United States. It occurs in California from Kern County to San Diego County.
