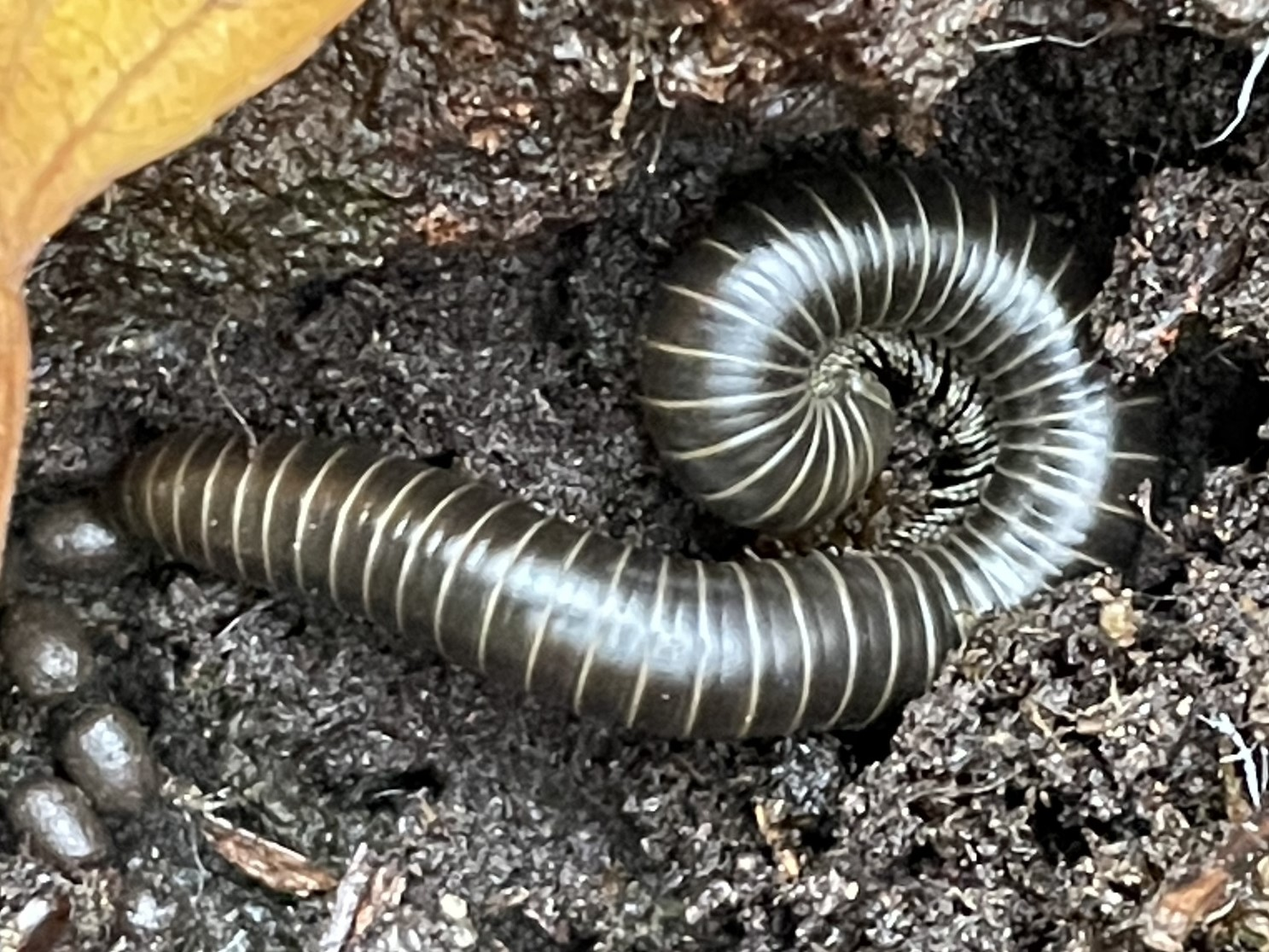

Scientific classification
- Domain: Eukaryota
- Kingdom: Animalia
- Phylum: Arthropoda
- Subphylum: Myriapoda
- Class: Diplopoda
- Order: Spirobolida
- Family: Spirobolidae
- Genus: Tylobolus
- Species: T. uncigerus

Binomial name
- Tylobolus uncigerus (Wood, 1864)

= Tylobolus uncigerus =

Species of millipede

Tylobolus uncigerus is a species of millipede in the family Spirobolidae. It is found in North America.
