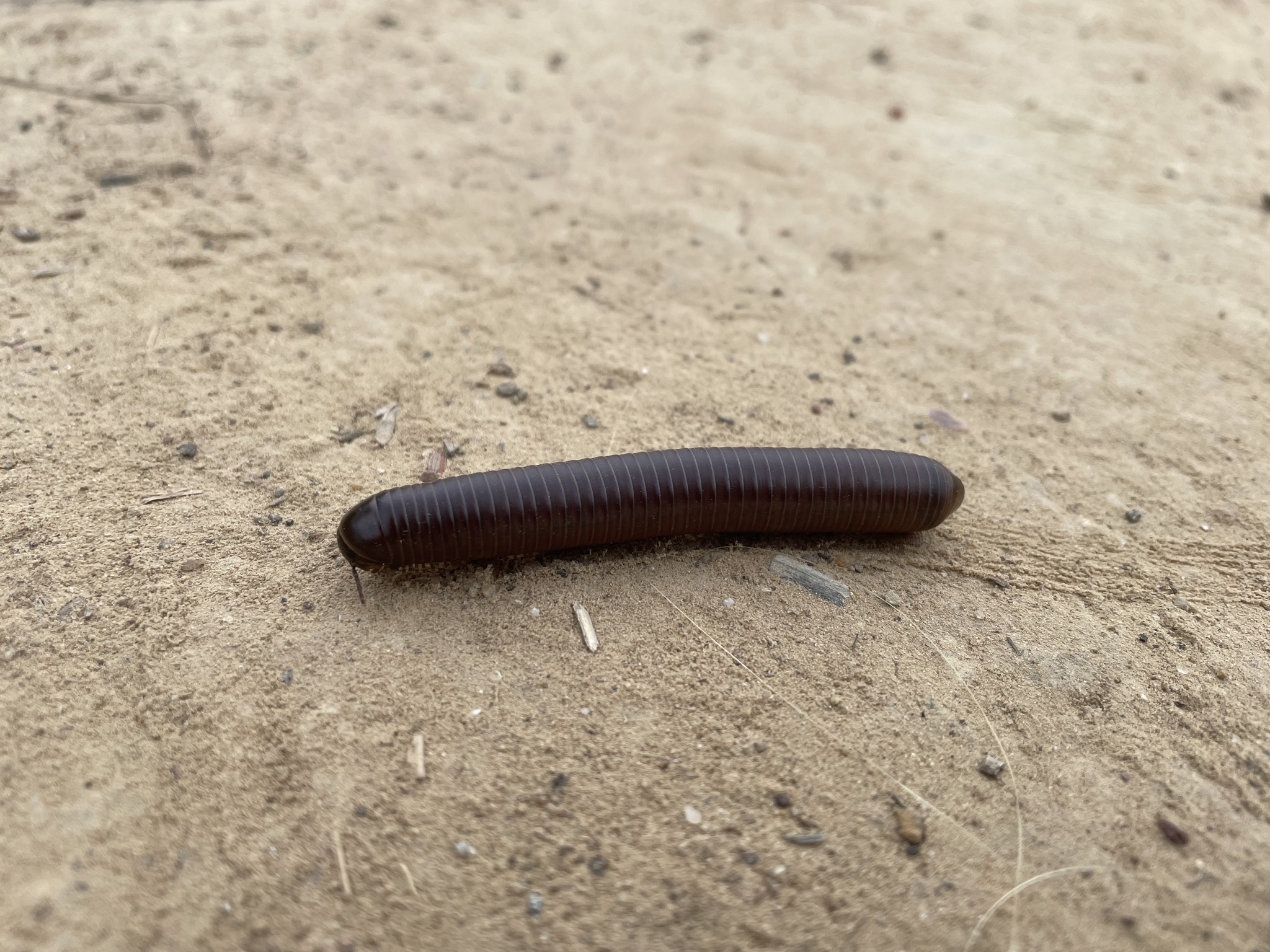
- Hiltonius hebes

Scientific classification
- Kingdom: Animalia
- Phylum: Arthropoda
- Subphylum: Myriapoda
- Class: Diplopoda
- Order: Spirobolida
- Family: Spirobolidae
- Subfamily: Tylobolinae
- Genus: Hiltonius; Chamberlin, 1918

Type species
- Hiltonius pulchrus

Species
- c. 10, see text

= Hiltonius =

Genus of millipedes

Hiltonius is a genus of cylindrical millipedes in the family Spirobolidae comprising 10 species ranging from the southwestern United States to Guatemala, with most species being found in Mexico. The genus was named by Ralph Vary Chamberlin in 1918, after Professor William A. Hilton of Pomona College who collected the type specimen of H. pulchrus.

== Description ==
Species of Hiltonius range from 35–70 mm (1.4–2.8 in) long and 4–10 mm (0.16–0.39 in) wide, with 40–49 body segments. The eyes are composed of patches of ocelli, widely spaced, containing 21 to 37 ocelli per patch. The legs are short, usually not reaching the sides of the body when held horizontally. Like many other spirobolids, color ranges from brown to nearly black, and thin bands of red or yellow may occur on the rear margins of each segment.

== Species ==
Hiltonius contains 10 named species. Some have wide distributions while others are known only from the type locality- the place where the type specimens were initially discovered. The northernmost species are H. pulchrus and H. carpinus, ranging into southern California and northern Arizona, respectively. A subspecies of H. carpinus occurs in an isolated population in Guatemala.

Species	Taxon author	Geographic range	Notes
H. australis	(Grinnell, 1908)	Los Angeles County, California.	This species may be a synonym of H. pulchrus or Tylobolus claremontus.
H. carpinus	Chamberlin, 1943	The subspecies H. carpinus carpinus ranges from southeast Arizona to the Mexican states of Guerrero and Mexico. H. carpinus volcans is known only from Volcán Tajumulco, southwestern Guatemala.
H. erythrotypus	Chamberlin, 1943	Mexico City	Possibly a synonym of H. mexicanus.
H. flavocinctus	Loomis, 1968	Nuevo Leon, Mexico
H. fossulifer	(Pocock, 1908)	Guerrero, Mexico	Possibly a synonym of H. carpinus.
H. hebes	(Bollman, 1887)	San Diego County, California to Baja California Norte, Mexico
H. mexicanus	(DeSaussure), 1859	Michoacan to Veracruz, Mexico
H. mimus	Chamberlin, 1941	San Diego County, California
H. pulchrus (type)	Chamberlin, 1918	Kern County to San Diego County, California
H. reptans	(von Porat, 1888)	Guanajuato, Mexico

== Similar species ==
Hiltonius co-occurs with some species of Tylobolus in southern California. Tylobolus species can be distinguished by larger maximum size (up to 92 mm or 3.6 in long), having more ocelli per eye patch (27–50), a larger hooked process on the coxa of the third leg in males, and in details of the gonopods, male reproductive structures.
