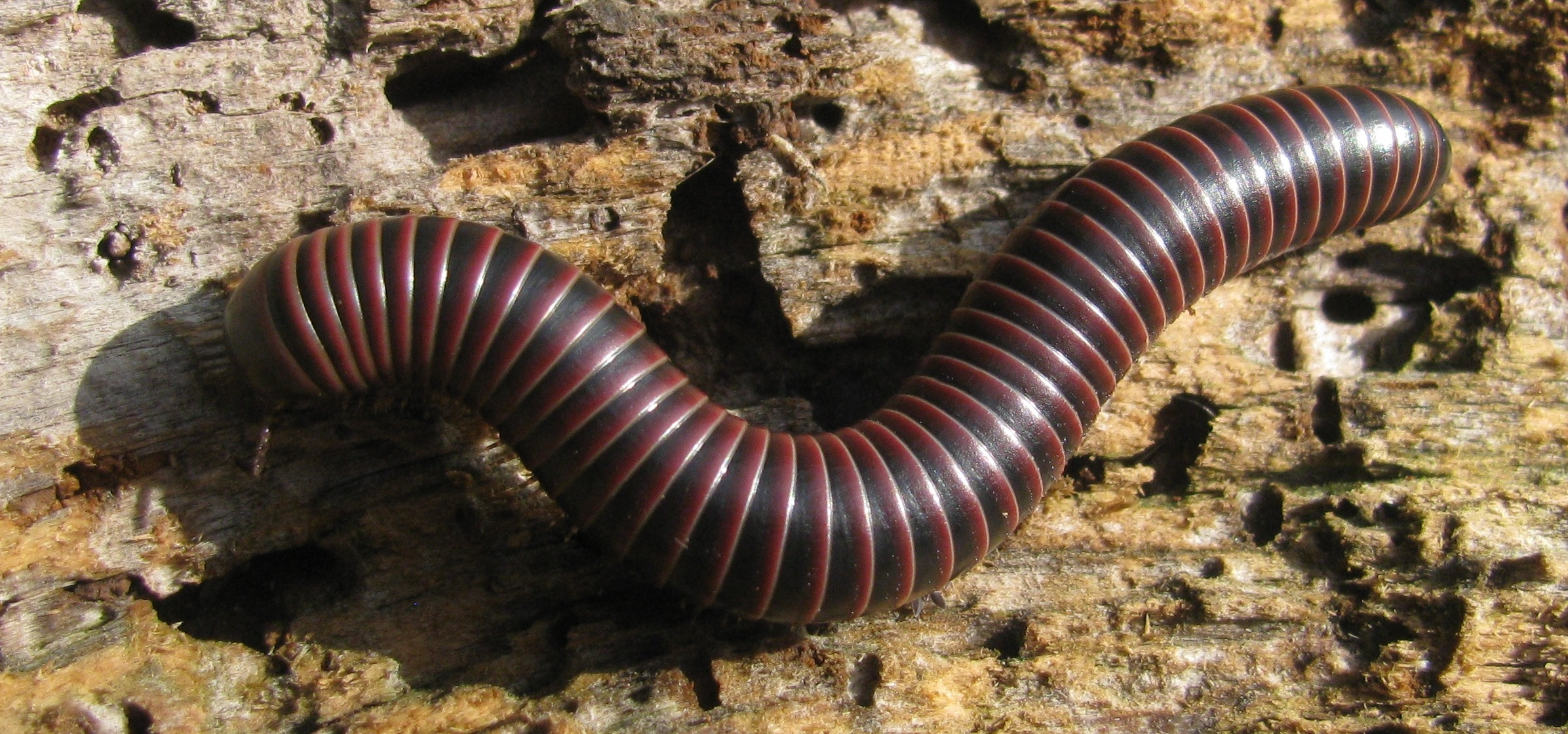

Scientific classification
- Kingdom: Animalia
- Phylum: Arthropoda
- Subphylum: Myriapoda
- Class: Diplopoda
- Order: Spirobolida
- Family: Spirobolidae
- Subfamily: Tylobolinae
- Genus: Tylobolus; Cook, 1904

Species
- T. castaneus T. claremontus T. deses (type); T. loomisi T. monachus T. uncigerus T. utahensis

Synonyms
- Auxobolus; Californibolus

= Tylobolus =

Genus of millipedes

Tylobolus is a genus of millipedes in the order Spirobolida with seven known species found in western North America. It is in the family Spirobolidae, and is the type genus of the subfamily Tylobolinae. The genus was named by Orator F. Cook in 1904.

== Description ==
Species of Tylobolus are medium to large millipedes ranging from 36–92 mm (1.4–3.6 in) long and 5 to 10 mm (0.20 to 0.39 in) wide, with females attaining larger sizes than males. They are cylindrical, or nearly so, and possess 40 to 54 segments (body rings) as adults. Body color ranges from black to reddish brown, the posterior margin of each ring may be faintly or strongly colored in red or yellow. The body rings are mostly smooth or with a very fine texture. The two eyes, each composed of 27-50 ocelli in a patch or "ocular field", are widely separated, with more than twice the width of a patch between them.

== Species ==
All species of Tylobolus occur on the Pacific Slope of North America, ranging from Washington state to Baja California, Mexico. Only one species occurs east of the Sierra Nevada mountains.

Tylobolus uncigerus is the northernmost species, ranging to just north of the Columbia River in Washington. The southernmost species, T. claremontus, ranges from Los Angeles and western Riverside County to northern Baja. Most of the Pacific species have small geographic ranges and do not overlap. The only species east of the Sierra Nevada is T. utahensis, which occurs in the Mojave Desert.

Species	Taxon author	Geographic range
T. castaneus	Chamberlin, 1918	The San Francisco Bay Area to Santa Cruz County, California, east to the western slopes of the Sierra Nevada
T. claremontus	Chamberlin, 1918	Coastal: Los Angeles County south to northeast Baja California.
T. deses (type)	Cook, 1904	Sonoma County to Sacramento County, South to Santa Cruz and Merced County
T. loomisi	Keeton, 1966	Santa Barbara County inland to Kern County, California
T. monachus	(Chamberlin, 1949)	Monterey County east to Fresno County, California
T. uncigerus	(Wood, 1864)	Southern Washington (Klickitat County) south to Santa Cruz County and inland to Mariposa County, California
T. utahensis	Chamberlin, 1925	Mojave Desert: Inyo County to Zion National Park, Utah and north of the Grand Canyon, Arizona

An additional species, "T. fredericksoni", was previously thought to occur in Kansas and Nebraska, but its existence is dubious, and may be attributable to Narceus americanus, a spirobolid common in the eastern U.S. Since no specimens of "T. fredericksoni" have been discovered since 1949 and the holotypes are highly fragmented and equivocal, the species is considered a nomen dubium or doubtful name.

== Classification ==
Anterior (left) and posterior (right) gonopods of Tylobolus uncigerus.

Tylobolus may be one of the most advanced genera of the family Spirobolidae, in terms of a number of traits it possesses that are absent or poorly developed in other spirobolids. Tylobolus is the type genus of the subfamily Tylobolinae which includes one other genus, Hiltonius, occurring from Southern California into Mexico. Of the two, Tylobolus is thought to be the more advanced due to more complex genital morphology, and a prominently hooked projection of the third pair of legs in males. Tylobolinae is thought to be more derived than the other subfamily, Spirobolinae. The family Spirobolidae itself is thought to be the most primitive family of the order Spirobolida.
