= Centipede bite =

Type of arthropod attack

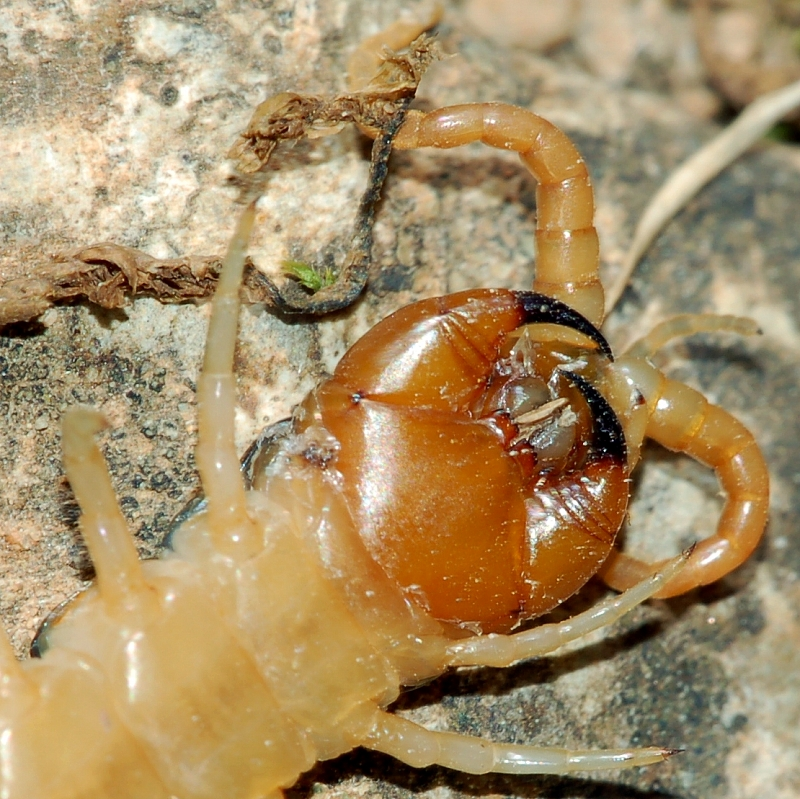
Underside of Scolopendra cingulata, showing the forcipules

A centipede bite is an injury resulting from the action of a centipede's forcipules, stinger-like appendages that pierce the skin and inject venom into the wound. Such a wound is not strictly speaking a bite, as the forcipules are a modified first pair of legs rather than true mouthparts. Clinically, the wound is viewed as a cutaneous condition characterized by paired hemorrhagic marks that form a chevron shape caused by the paired forcipules.

The centipede's venom causes pain and swelling in the area of the bite, and may cause other reactions throughout the body. The majority of bites are not life-threatening to humans and present the greatest risk to children and those who develop allergic reactions.

== Symptoms and signs ==
Symptoms which are most likely to develop include:

- Pain
- Swelling and redness
- Minor bleeding
- Itching and burning sensations.

Other symptoms such as hardening of the skin and tissue death may also occur.

== Treatment ==
Centipede bites, while painful, rarely cause severe health complications in people. Centipede venoms are heat-labile, and warm-water immersion may help reduce pain and swelling. Icing also helps.

== Society and culture ==
Naturalist Jacques-Henri Bernardin de Saint-Pierre reported that his dog developed a serious ulcer after a centipede bite during travels in Mauritius.

YouTube personality Coyote Peterson has been intentionally bitten by Scolopendra heros (giant desert centipede) and declares that the pain caused by the bite is worse than a bullet ant sting.

Muay Thai fighter Dokmaipa Por Pongsawang died after a bite from an arthropod described as a takhap (large centipede). Taiwanese folk musician Difang Duana's death was accelerated by a centipede bite he suffered six months earlier. Both Pongsawang and Duana were diabetic.

== See also ==
- Millipede burn
- Skin lesion
