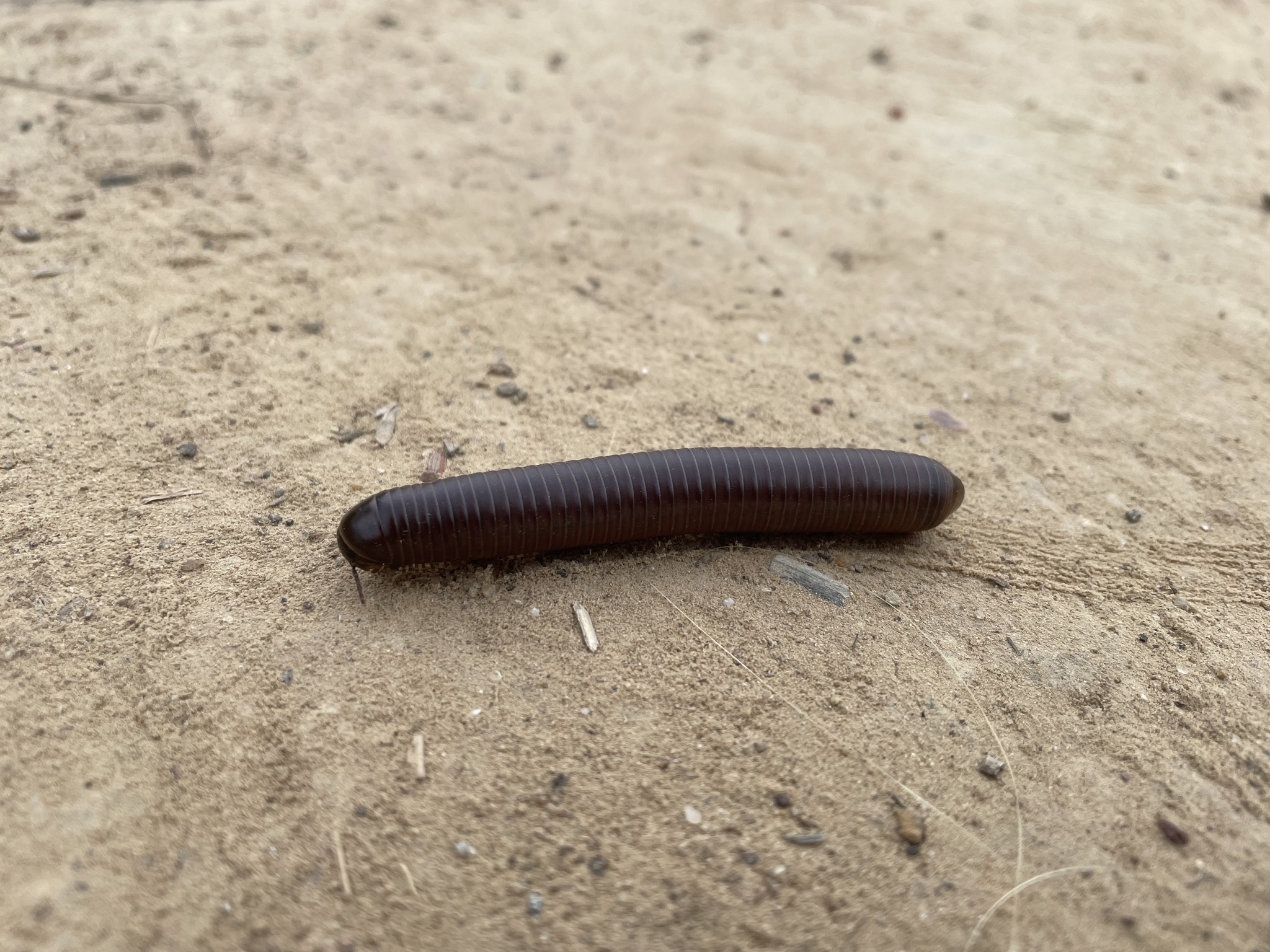

Scientific classification
- Kingdom: Animalia
- Phylum: Arthropoda
- Subphylum: Myriapoda
- Class: Diplopoda
- Order: Spirobolida
- Family: Spirobolidae
- Genus: Hiltonius
- Species: H. hebes

Binomial name
- Hiltonius hebes (Bollman, 1887)

= Hiltonius hebes =

Species of millipede

Hiltonius hebes is a species of millipede in the family Spirobolidae.
