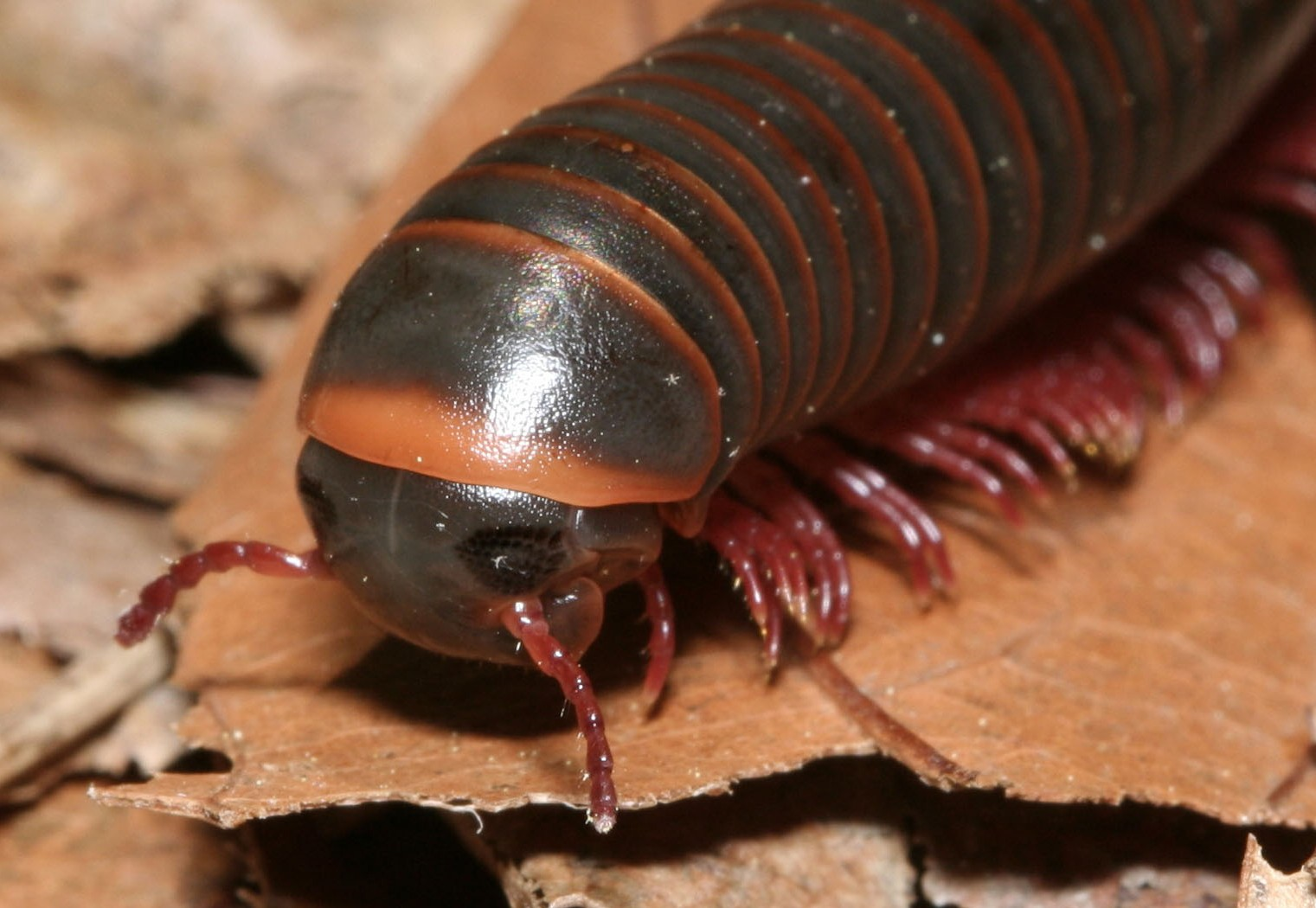
- Narceus americanus

Scientific classification
- Domain: Eukaryota
- Kingdom: Animalia
- Phylum: Arthropoda
- Subphylum: Myriapoda
- Class: Diplopoda
- Order: Spirobolida
- Family: Spirobolidae
- Genus: Narceus; Rafinesque 1820

Synonyms
- Rhexenor (Rafinesque 1820)

= Narceus =

Genus of millipedes

Narceus is a genus of large cylindrical millipedes of the family Spirobolidae native to eastern North America. The genus comprises three or four species, two of which are endemic to Florida, and the remainder forming a species complex. The species of Narceus include some of the largest and most recognizable millipedes in eastern North America.

== Description ==
Narceus individuals range from 4 to 12 cm (1.6 to 4.7 in) long, with 45 to 59 segments as adults. Their body color is various shades of brown with reddish to yellow stripes on each segment.

== Species ==
- Narceus americanus / Narceus annularis complex - New England to Minnesota, south to Texas and Florida. Extends into southern Quebec and Ontario in Canada.
- Narceus gordanus - Florida to South Carolina, possibly Tennessee
- Narceus woodruffi - Florida

The species N. americanus and N. annularis are widely distributed in North America, and may represent an intergradation of forms rather than two distinct species, a group known as the "N. americanus/annularis complex".
