= Narceus woodruffi =

Scientific classification
- Kingdom: Animalia
- Phylum: Arthropoda
- Subphylum: Myriapoda
- Class: Diplopoda
- Order: Spirobolida
- Family: Spirobolidae
- Genus: Narceus
- Species: N. woodruffi

Binomial name
- Narceus woodruffi Causey, 1959

Species of millipede

Narceus woodruffi is a species of millipede endemic to Florida. Described in 1959, it is the smallest species of the genus Narceus, with adults measuring up to 50 mm in length and 4 mm in width.

== See also ==
- Floridobolus, a genus of millipedes also endemic to Florida
