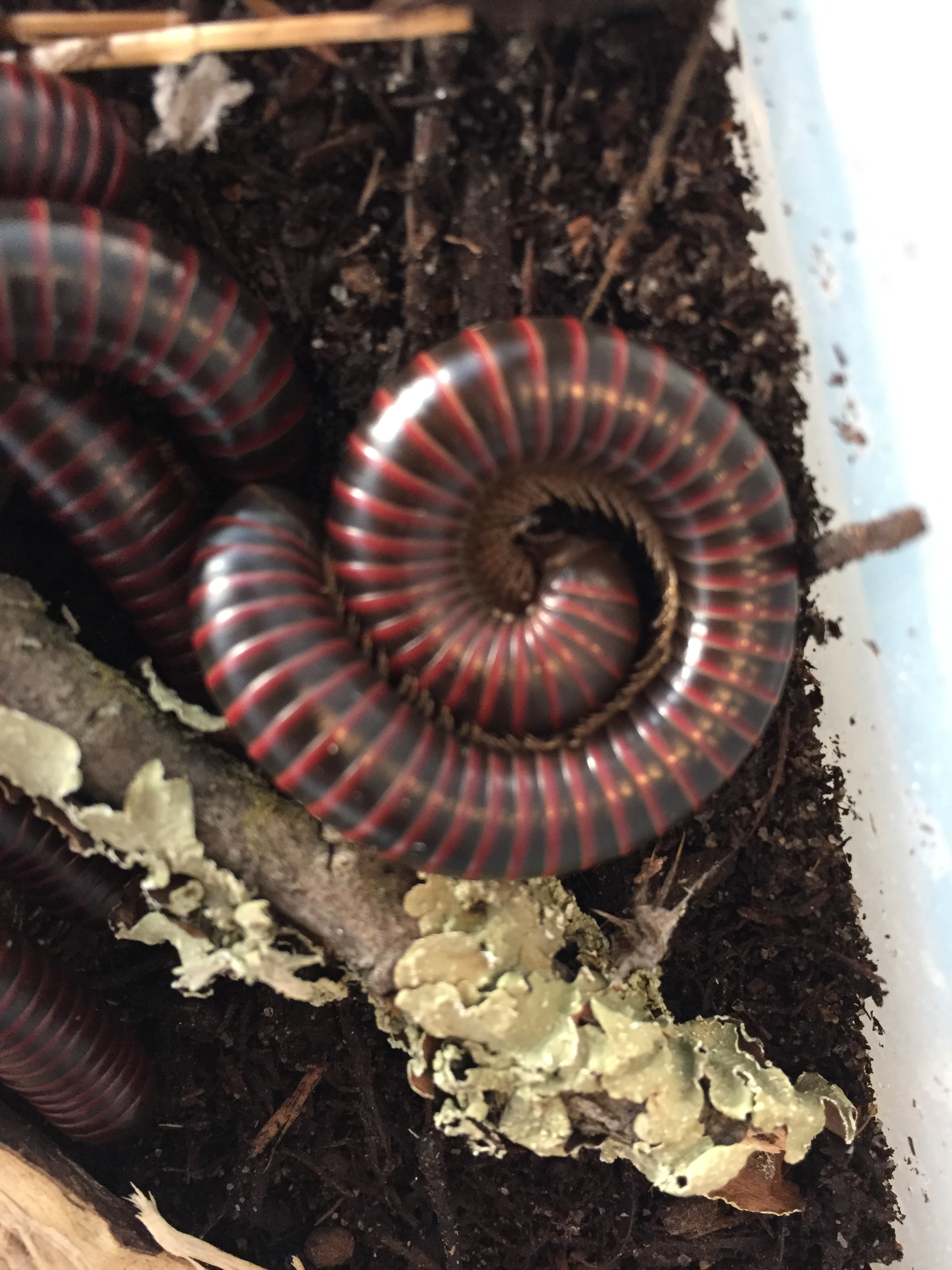

Scientific classification
- Kingdom: Animalia
- Phylum: Arthropoda
- Subphylum: Myriapoda
- Class: Diplopoda
- Order: Spirobolida
- Family: Spirobolidae
- Genus: Tylobolus
- Species: T. castaneus

Binomial name
- Tylobolus castaneus (Chamberlin, 1918)

= Tylobolus castaneus =

Species of millipede

Tylobolus castaneus is a species of millipede in the family Spirobolidae. It is found in Northern California, typically between Fresno and Contra Costa.
