= Ottine wetlands =

Ecosystem in Gonzales County, Texas, US

Coordinates: 29.5976°N 97.5837°W

The Ottine wetlands or Ottine swamp is an ecosystem along the San Marcos River in and around Palmetto State Park in Gonzales County, Texas. Comprising approximately 202 hectares, the wetlands are geographically distinct from other Texas wetlands, and located at the boundary of several biogeographic regions, resulting in a relatively high diversity of plant and animal species.
