= Millipede burn =

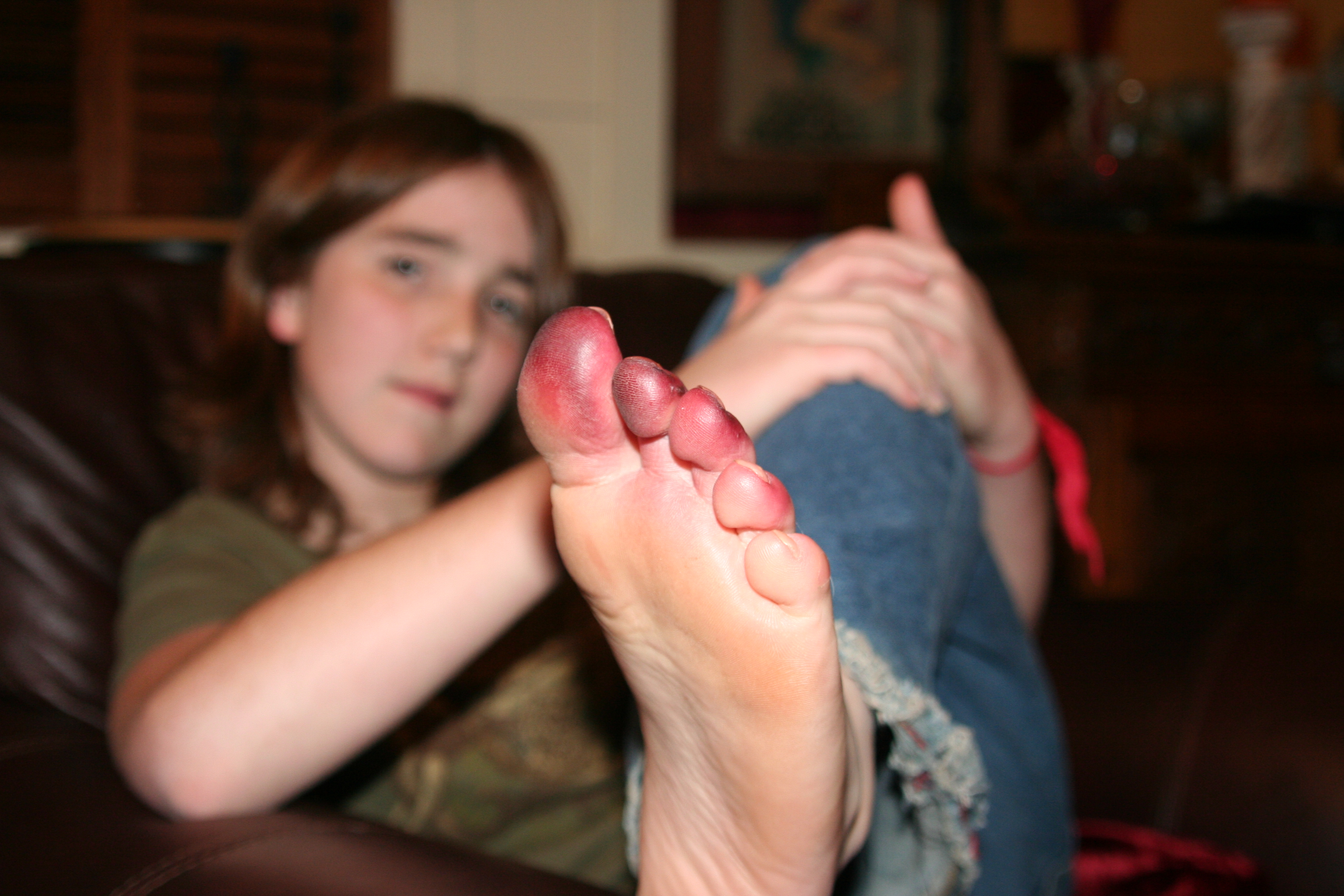
- The effects of a millipede burn on the foot
- Specialty: Dermatology

Millipede burns are a cutaneous condition caused by certain millipedes that secrete a toxic liquid that causes a brownish pigmentation and/or burns when it comes into contact with the skin. Some millipedes produce quinones in their defensive secretions, which have been reported to cause brown staining of the skin.

== See also ==
- Centipede bite
- Skin lesion
