= Geophilus osquidatum =

Scientific classification
- Kingdom: Animalia
- Phylum: Arthropoda
- Subphylum: Myriapoda
- Class: Chilopoda
- Order: Geophilomorpha
- Family: Geophilidae
- Genus: Geophilus
- Species: G. osquidatum

Binomial name
- Geophilus osquidatum Brölemann, 1909

Species of soil centipede

Geophilus osquidatum is a species of soil centipede in the family Geophilidae found in western Europe, from mainland Spain through western France to Britain and Ireland, though it's also been recorded in Italy, Czech Republic, and Germany. Males of this species have 51 to 57 pairs of legs; females have 53 to 63 leg pairs. This species grows up to 30 millimeters and is bright yellow with a darker reddish head. Because of this, it's often confused with G. flavus and G. gracilis. Its subspecies, G. osquidatum porosum, was found synonymous with G. flavus. In Britain, G. osquidatum is found in a wide range of habitats including woodland, grassland, and coastal shingle as well as gardens and waste ground.
