= Geophilus sounkyoensis =

Scientific classification
- Kingdom: Animalia
- Phylum: Arthropoda
- Subphylum: Myriapoda
- Class: Chilopoda
- Order: Geophilomorpha
- Family: Geophilidae
- Genus: Geophilus
- Species: G. sounkyoensis

Binomial name
- Geophilus sounkyoensis Takakuwa, 1937

Species of centipede

Geophilus sounkyoensis is a species of soil centipede in the family Geophilidae. This centipede is found in Japan and Russia. This species can have either 55 or 57 pairs of legs and can reach 40 mm in length.

== Discovery and distribution ==
This species was first described in 1937 by the Japanese myriapodologist Yosioki Takakuwa. He based the original description of this species on specimens that included both sexes. These specimens were found in the Sounkyo area on the island of Hokkaido in Japan. Since the discovery of this species, this centipede has also been recorded in the Maritime territory (Primorsky Krai) of the Russian Far East.

== Description ==
This species can reach 40 mm in length. This centipede has a yellow body with a slightly brown anterior. Males of this species have 55 pairs of legs, whereas females have 57 leg pairs.

The clypeus features few bristles. The middle of the labrum features five rounded teeth. The terminal element of the second maxillae is like a claw that is longer than the surrounding setae. The first article of the forcipule is slightly longer than wide. The first three articles of the forcipule lack denticles, but the ultimate article features a denticle at the base.

The anterior sternites feature a projection on the posterior margin and a pit on the anterior margin ("carpophagus" pit). The ventral surface of the anterior leg-bearing segments feature fields of pores that are absent on the posterior segments. These pores are arranged in a band on the posterior part of the sternite with other sparse pores on the anterior part of the sternite. The transverse pore-field is one-half the width of the sternite and has a straight anterior margin but a convex posterior margin.

The sternite of the ultimate leg-bearing segment is wider than long. The basal element of each ultimate leg features several pores, with most of them close to the margin of the corresponding sternite, but one large pore is located separately and to the rear of the others. The ultimate legs each end in a claw, and these legs are thicker and more densely covered with bristles in the male than in the female. The telson features anal pores.

This species shares many features with others in the genus Geophilus. For example, like other species in the same genus, this species features teeth on the middle piece of the labrum, transverse bands of pores on the anterior sternites, and claws on the second maxillae and the ultimate legs. Furthermore, as in other Geophilus species, the anterior sternites feature a pit in the middle of the anterior margin, and most of the pores on the ultimate legs are close to the sternite.

This species shares an especially extensive set of traits with G. rhomboideus, another Geophilus species found in Japan and the Russian Far East. For example, not only are most pores on the ultimate legs close to the sternite in both species, but each of the ultimate legs in these species also features a single pore located apart from the others. Furthermore, both of these species feature anal pores.

These two species can be distinguished, however, based on other features. For example, G. rhomboideus has fewer legs (ranging from 43 to 49 pairs) than G. sounkyoensis. Furthermore, the ventral pore-field is shaped like a diamond (that is, a rhombus) in G. rhomboideus but has a straight anterior margin in G. sounkyoensis. Moreover, the isolated pore on the ultimate legs is relatively large in G. sounkyoensis but relatively small in G. rhomboideus.
