= Geophilus dentatus =

Scientific classification
- Kingdom: Animalia
- Phylum: Arthropoda
- Subphylum: Myriapoda
- Class: Chilopoda
- Order: Geophilomorpha
- Family: Geophilidae
- Genus: Geophilus
- Species: G. dentatus

Binomial name
- Geophilus dentatus Takakuwa, 1936

Synonyms
- Brachygeophilus dentatus Takakuwa, 1936

Species of centipede

Geophilus dentatus is a species of soil centipede in the family Geophilidae found in Hokkaido. It's yellow in color, 25 millimeters in length, with 41-47 leg pairs and two clearly visible terminal pores (pores at the base of the final leg pair). It's very similar to G. truncorum, but differs in the number of outer palpi on the 1st maxillae, the presence of denticles in the midpiece of the labrum, and the number of terminal pores.
