= Geophilus anonyx =

Scientific classification
- Kingdom: Animalia
- Phylum: Arthropoda
- Subphylum: Myriapoda
- Class: Chilopoda
- Order: Geophilomorpha
- Family: Geophilidae
- Genus: Geophilus
- Species: G. anonyx

Binomial name
- Geophilus anonyx (Chamberlin, 1941)

Synonyms
- Brachygeophilus anonyx Brolemann, 1909

Species of centipede in the US

Geophilus anonyx is a species of soil centipede in the family Geophilidae found in Oregon. It was originally placed in the genus Brachygeophilus based on the lack of sternal pores, a character shared with the type species B. truncorum (now Geophilus truncorum), however it was later moved to Geophilus.

== Description ==
G. anonyx has 57 leg pairs and grows to a length of 24 millimeters. It's characterized by a prosternum lacking chitinous lines; dorsal plates distinctly bisulcate (cloven); spiracles all circular, last ventral plate narrow; coxal pores small, about a dozen on each side; anal pores present, distinct; and anal legs with tarsus biarticulate, without terminal claw. Like G. tampophor, it differs from other western American geophilids by having prehensorial claws armed at the base, however unlike G. tampophor it possesses unarmed anal claws and a greater number of legs.
