= Geophilus gracilis =

Scientific classification
- Kingdom: Animalia
- Phylum: Arthropoda
- Subphylum: Myriapoda
- Class: Chilopoda
- Order: Geophilomorpha
- Family: Geophilidae
- Genus: Geophilus
- Species: G. gracilis

Binomial name
- Geophilus gracilis Meinert, 1870

Synonyms
- G. fucorum seurati Brölemann, 1924

Species of centipede

Geophilus gracilis is a species of soil centipede in the family Geophilidae found most commonly in Britain and Ireland, though specimens have also been recorded in Chile, France, Greece, and Algeria. It lives under mud and stones along the coast near or below the high tide mark, grows up to 30 millimeters in length, and is bright yellow in color with a darker reddish head. Males of this species have 51 to 57 pairs of legs; females have 51 to 61 leg pairs. This species is often confused with G. flavus and, in coastal locations, G. osquidatum.

== Taxonomy ==
G. gracilis was found to be synonymous with G. fucorum seurati, a subspecies of G. fucorum, and is closely related to both G. algarum and G. fucorum. It is differentiated from the two by 3–5 labral teeth, an absence of a clear clypeal area, 7–15 prehensorial teeth, 2–5 ventral (posterior) pores, and a claw of the anal leg that ranges from small to large. Several characters of G. gracilis are intermediate between those of G. algarum and G. fucorum, leading some to believe that the three are a single polytypic species consisting of highly individual subspecies.
