= Geophilus okolonae =

Scientific classification
- Kingdom: Animalia
- Phylum: Arthropoda
- Subphylum: Myriapoda
- Class: Chilopoda
- Order: Geophilomorpha
- Family: Geophilidae
- Genus: Geophilus
- Species: G. okolonae

Binomial name
- Geophilus okolonae Bollman, 1888

Species of centipede

Geophilus okolonae is a species of soil centipede in the family Geophilidae found in Okolona, Arkansas. The male of this species has 61 pairs of legs; the female has 63 leg pairs. This species grows up to 40 millimeters long. G. okolonae differs from other North American species by the exposed prebasal plates and absence of coxal pores.

== Taxonomy ==
G. okolonae was considered a junior synonym of Geophilus rubens (which is itself synonymous with Geophilus vittatus) by Chamberlin and a junior synonym of G. vittatus by Kevan, but it differs from both these species according to the original description.
