= Geophilus claremontus =

Scientific classification
- Kingdom: Animalia
- Phylum: Arthropoda
- Subphylum: Myriapoda
- Class: Chilopoda
- Order: Geophilomorpha
- Family: Geophilidae
- Genus: Geophilus
- Species: G. claremontus

Binomial name
- Geophilus claremontus (Chamberlin, 1909)

Synonyms
- Brachygeophilus claremontus (Attems, 1929)

Species of centipede

Geophilus claremontus is a species of soil centipede in the family Geophilidae found in Claremont, California, after which it was named. It was incorrectly placed in the genus Brachygeophilus in 1929 by Attems, most likely based on the lack of sternal pores.

== Description ==
The species grows up to 40 mm in length and has 65 leg pairs, the first of which is short and slender, the last of which bears a single claw each. The cephalic plate bears a frontal furrow as well as two longitudinal furrows diverging from the posterior edge. The pleural pores are ventral, about fifteen on each side; the most posterior pore is somewhat isolated and the inner row is covered by the final sternite. In addition, G. claremontus also possesses an anterior sternum with a median furrow and shallowly notched anterior edge. It was described as being apparently closely related to G. legiferens (now G. varians).
