= Geophilus richardi =

Scientific classification
- Kingdom: Animalia
- Phylum: Arthropoda
- Subphylum: Myriapoda
- Class: Chilopoda
- Order: Geophilomorpha
- Family: Geophilidae
- Genus: Geophilus
- Species: G. richardi

Binomial name
- Geophilus richardi Brolemann, 1904

Species of centipede

Geophilus richardi is a species of soil centipede in the family Geophilidae. This centipede is found in France and Monaco in the Western Alps as well as in Italy and the Ionian islands. This species is notable as one of only two in the family Geophilidae to include centipedes with as few as 29 leg pairs. This centipede is also notable for its small size, reaching only 10 mm in length.

== Discovery ==
This species was first described by the French myriapodologist Henri W. Brölemann in 1904. The original description of this species is based on two female specimens found in Monaco. Brölemann named this species for the French oceanographer Jules Richard, director of the Musée Océanographique de Monaco, who collected these specimens in 1902.

== Distribution ==
Since the discovery of this centipede in Monaco, this species has been recorded in other Mediterranean localities in Europe, first elsewhere in the Maritime Alps, in the commune of Villeneuve-Loubet in France, then in the comune of Subiaco in the city of Rome in Italy. More recently, this species has been found not only elsewhere on the Italian mainland but also on Italian islands, including Sardinia and Sicily as well as Pianosa and Giannutri in the Tuscan Archipelago, and on the Ionian islands of Greece. On the Italian mainland, this species has been recorded not only in the northwestern regions of Piedmont and Liguria but also from the Tuscan-Emilian Apennines down to southern Calabria.

== Ecology and habitats ==
This species has been recorded in meadows with mosses and humus from the cork oak tree (Quercus suber) or another evergreen, Pistacia lentiscus, from sea level to 350 m in elevation. This species has also been found in woods of the maritime pine (Pinus pinaster), in maquis shrubland with the holm oak (Quercus ilex) and Pistacia lentiscus, and among shrubs of carob (Ceratonia siliqua), rockrose (Cistus), and the strawberry tree (Arbustus unedo), at altitudes up to 710 m in elevation. This species has not been recorded in caves.

== Description ==
Females of this species have 33 pairs of legs, whereas males can have either 29 or 31 leg pairs, but are usually recorded with 31 pairs. This centipede is small, ranging from only 5 mm to 10 mm in length. The body is tapered at each end, and the head is shaped like a rectangle with rounded corners. The head, trunk, and legs feature short setae.

The dorsal shield on the head is slightly longer than wide, with a width/length ratio of 0.97, and the antennae are each 2.8 times as long as the cephalic shield. The labrum is divided into distinct lateral and middle pieces, with four teeth on the middle piece. The inner teeth are short and blunt, but the outer teeth are longer and pointed. Each telopodite of the first maxillae features two articles with a single lappet on the basal article. Each of the second maxillae ends in a short curved claw that tapers gradually. The forcipular tergite leaves a short sclerite exposed in front. The ultimate article of the forcipules features a large basal tooth, but the internal margin of this article is not serrate.

The sternites from the second segment to the middle of the trunk feature fields of pores, but this species lacks the pores typically observed on the ventral surface of most soil centipedes, which usually feature pores from 2 to 4 micrometers in diameter that are each surrounded by a cuticular ring. Instead, the sternites in G. richardi bear a small number of pores from 0.5 to 1 micrometer in diameter. These pores are bounded by a cuticular ring, like the pores typically observed in other species and unlike smaller micropores, which lack such a ring. The small pores observed in G. richardi are possibly the remnants of typical ventral pores, their smaller size being a byproduct of overall miniaturization.

Each of the ultimate legs lacks dorsal coxal pores and features two large ventral pores partly covered by the sternite. Each of the ultimate legs ends in a claw. The telson features two small anal pores.

This species shares many features with others in the genus Geophilus. For example, like other species in the same genus, this species features teeth on the middle piece of the labrum, lappets on the first maxillae, and claws on the ultimate legs. Furthermore, as in other Geophilus species, the head is only slightly elongated in this species, and the pores on the ultimate legs are close to the sternite.

A few other Geophilus species found in Europe also include centipedes with a number of legs similar to those observed in G. richardi. For example, G. persephones features 29 leg pairs, G. hadesi features 33 pairs, and G. minimus and G. ribauti can each feature as few as 33 pairs. Each of these species, however, can be distinguished from G. richardi based on other traits. For example, G. richardi features fewer pores on the ultimate legs than found in these other species. Furthermore, the second maxillae each end in a tubercle in G. hadesi, G. persephones, and G. minimus, whereas these maxillae each end in a curved claw in G. richardi. Moreover, both G. persephones and G. hadesi are found in caves and both share troglomorphic traits, such as elongated antennae: The antennae are at least four times as long as the head is wide in these two species but less than three times as long as the head is wide in G. richardi.
