= Geophilus bipartitus =

Scientific classification
- Kingdom: Animalia
- Phylum: Arthropoda
- Subphylum: Myriapoda
- Class: Chilopoda
- Order: Geophilomorpha
- Family: Geophilidae
- Genus: Geophilus
- Species: G. bipartitus

Binomial name
- Geophilus bipartitus Takakuwa, 1937

Species of centipede

Geophilus bipartitus is a species of soil centipede in the family Geophilidae found in Japan. It grows up to 15 millimeters in length; the males have about 35 leg pairs, the females 39. It lives in Japanese white birch.
