= Geophilus fucorum =

Scientific classification
- Kingdom: Animalia
- Phylum: Arthropoda
- Subphylum: Myriapoda
- Class: Chilopoda
- Order: Geophilomorpha
- Family: Geophilidae
- Genus: Geophilus
- Species: G. fucorum

Binomial name
- Geophilus fucorum Brölemann, 1900

Species of centipede

Geophilus fucorum is a halophilic species of soil centipede in the family Geophilidae found in the French Mediterranean, Corsica, Italy, and Greece. Males of this species have 49 to 53 pairs of legs; females have 51 to 55.

== Taxonomy ==
G. fucorum shares several characteristics with both G. algarum and G. gracilis, which was previously classified as a subspecies of G. fucorum, leading some to believe that the three are a single species consisting of highly individual subspecies. It's differentiated from the two by having 5-7 labral teeth, absence of a clear clypeal area, 12-14 prehensorial teeth, two clustered and one isolated ventral (posterior) pore, and a rudimentary claw of the anal leg.
