= Geophilus nanus =

Scientific classification
- Kingdom: Animalia
- Phylum: Arthropoda
- Subphylum: Myriapoda
- Class: Chilopoda
- Order: Geophilomorpha
- Family: Geophilidae
- Genus: Geophilus
- Species: G. nanus

Binomial name
- Geophilus nanus (Attems, 1952)

Centipede

Geophilus nanus is a species of soil centipede in the family Geophilidae found on the Iberian Peninsula. It's a poorly defined species described as being pale yellow, 15 mm long, with smooth sternites bearing no furrows, final hip with few pores next to the sternite rim, tergites deeply double-furrowed from the basal shield onward, and 41 leg pairs. It’s apparently related to G. gracilis, differentiated by jaws that do not surpass the forehead or bear chitin lines, and by the 2nd tarsal segment of the final leg pair being just a tiny stub.
