= Geophilus punicus =

Scientific classification
- Kingdom: Animalia
- Phylum: Arthropoda
- Subphylum: Myriapoda
- Class: Chilopoda
- Order: Geophilomorpha
- Family: Geophilidae
- Genus: Geophilus
- Species: G. punicus

Binomial name
- Geophilus punicus Silvestri, 1896

Synonyms
- G. flavus var. punicus Silvestri, 1896; G. flavidus Koch: Verhoeff, 1925a

Species of centipede

Geophilus punicus is a species of soil centipede in the family Geophilidae found in the Western Mediterranean, specifically Italy (Sicily, Sardinia) and North Africa (Tunisia). It's an epigeic species, though its habitat preferences are unknown apart from one record from caves, indicating it may also be a trogloxene. The original description of this species is based on male specimens with 43 pairs of legs.

== Taxonomy ==
Geophilus punicus was originally described as a subspecies of G. flavus, G. flavus var. punicus, by Silvestri (1896a). It was later raised to species rank by Minelli in the World Catalogue of Centipedes (2006). The name "Geophilus flavidus Koch" published by Verhoeff in 1925 was probably due to a misreading of G. flavus punicus. G. punicus is considered a junior synonym of G. longicornis var. austriacus Latzel, 1880 by Attems (1929 - Das Tierreich, 52: 174), but they actually differ according to the original description.
