= Geophilus monoporus =

Scientific classification
- Kingdom: Animalia
- Phylum: Arthropoda
- Subphylum: Myriapoda
- Class: Chilopoda
- Order: Geophilomorpha
- Family: Geophilidae
- Genus: Geophilus
- Species: G. monoporus

Binomial name
- Geophilus monoporus Takakuwa, 1934

Species of centipede

Geophilus monoporus is a species of soil centipede in the family Geophilidae found in Tiba, Japan. This species can reach 45 mm in length and has 87 pairs of legs. The species name refers to the single pore at the base of each of the ultimate legs.
