= Geophilus koreanus =

Scientific classification
- Kingdom: Animalia
- Phylum: Arthropoda
- Subphylum: Myriapoda
- Class: Chilopoda
- Order: Geophilomorpha
- Family: Geophilidae
- Genus: Geophilus
- Species: G. koreanus

Binomial name
- Geophilus koreanus Takakuwa, 1936

Synonyms
- Brachygeophilus koreanus Takakuwa, 1936

Species of centipede

Geophilus koreanus is a species of soil centipede in the family Geophilidae found in North Korea. It's yellow in color and grows up to 30 millimeters long, with 69 leg pairs, a clypeus rather longer than wide, filiform antennae, central part of the labrum with 8 teeth, maxilla completely fused without median suture, tergite bifurcate, final leg tarsus bipartite, and a clawed pratarsus. It's similar to G. strictus, though the latter differs by the middle part of the labrum bearing a large number of very small teeth, and the final hip bearing a large number of pores.
