= Geophilus oweni =

Scientific classification
- Kingdom: Animalia
- Phylum: Arthropoda
- Subphylum: Myriapoda
- Class: Chilopoda
- Order: Geophilomorpha
- Family: Geophilidae
- Genus: Geophilus
- Species: G. oweni

Binomial name
- Geophilus oweni Brölemann, 1887

Species of centipede

Geophilus oweni is a species of soil centipede in the family Geophilidae found in Missouri, Indiana, and Ohio. It grows up to 40 millimeters in length, has 67-73 leg pairs in males and 71-77 in females, and varies from bright to faded yellow in color. G. oweni can be identified by its numerous leg pairs, lack of consolidated sacculi, prelabral consolidated areas, and long, thin second maxillary apical claws. G. missouriensis (Chamberlin, 1928) was found to be synonymous with G. oweni.
