= Geophilus algarum =

Scientific classification
- Domain: Eukaryota
- Kingdom: Animalia
- Phylum: Arthropoda
- Subphylum: Myriapoda
- Class: Chilopoda
- Order: Geophilomorpha
- Family: Geophilidae
- Genus: Geophilus
- Species: G. algarum

Binomial name
- Geophilus algarum Brölemann, 1909

Species of centipede

Geophilus algarum is a species of centipede in the family Geophilidae found in the littoral zone on the French Atlantic and Channel Coasts. It has one subspecies, G. algarum var. decipiens, which can be identified by lack of a dorsal coxal pore. The male of this species has 53 pairs of legs; females have 53 to 59. This species can reach 35 mm in length.

== Taxonomy ==
G. algarum shares several characteristics with both G. fucorum and G. gracilis, leading some to believe that the three are a single polytypic species consisting of highly individual subspecies. G. algarum is differentiated from the other two centipedes by having two labral teeth, a clear clypeal area, 8–12 prehensorial teeth, three ventral (posterior) and one dorsal coxal pore, and a well-developed claw of the anal leg.
