= Geophilus crenulatus =

Scientific classification
- Kingdom: Animalia
- Phylum: Arthropoda
- Subphylum: Myriapoda
- Class: Chilopoda
- Order: Geophilomorpha
- Family: Geophilidae
- Genus: Geophilus
- Species: G. crenulatus

Binomial name
- Geophilus crenulatus Silvestri, 1936

Synonyms
- Geophilus intermissus var. crenulata (Silvestri, 1936)

Species of centipede

Geophilus crenulatus is a species of soil centipede in the family Geophilidae found in a ravine above the Hemis monastery in India, 3525 meters above sea level. It was originally thought to be a subspecies of G. intermissus and named Geophilus intermissus var. crenulata. The original description of this species is based on a specimen measuring 22 mm in length with 57 pairs of legs.
