= Geophilus bobolianus =

Scientific classification
- Kingdom: Animalia
- Phylum: Arthropoda
- Subphylum: Myriapoda
- Class: Chilopoda
- Order: Geophilomorpha
- Family: Geophilidae
- Genus: Geophilus
- Species: G. bobolianus

Binomial name
- Geophilus bobolianus Verhoeff, 1928

Synonyms
- Geophilus longicornis aternanus Verhoeff, 1934

Species of centipede

Geophilus bobolianus is a species of soil centipede in the family Geophilidae found in France and Italy. This species has 45 to 51 pairs of legs. It was originally classified as a subspecies of G. longicornis (now G. flavus) identified by its lack of anterior sternal pores.
