= Geophilus brevicornis =

Scientific classification
- Kingdom: Animalia
- Phylum: Arthropoda
- Subphylum: Myriapoda
- Class: Chilopoda
- Order: Geophilomorpha
- Family: Geophilidae
- Genus: Geophilus
- Species: G. brevicornis

Binomial name
- Geophilus brevicornis Wood, 1862

Species of centipede

Geophilus brevicornis is a species of soil centipede in the family Geophilidae found on the continental United States, ranging from New Orleans to Galveston and south Illinois. It's deep orange and grows up to 50 millimeters (2 inches) long, with a robust, almost cylindrical body, 55 or 57 leg pairs, a relatively small cephalic segment, generally smooth scuta (sclerotised plates on the anterior (front) dorsal (upper) surface, just behind the head) with distinct scuto-spiscutal sutures, and mandibles each with a single rather large tooth (sometimes two).

== Related species ==
Geophila brevicornis is a junior homonym of G. brevicornis C.L. Koch, 1837 (now Stenotaenia linearis). G. brevicornis was at first thought to be a male of G. laevis (now Geophilus vittatus), but upon closer examination they differed in the size of the cephalic segment and length of antennae (both relatively smaller in G. brevicornis), as well as the punctations of the head, number of segments, and robustness of body.
