= Geophilus tampophor =

Scientific classification
- Kingdom: Animalia
- Phylum: Arthropoda
- Subphylum: Myriapoda
- Class: Chilopoda
- Order: Geophilomorpha
- Family: Geophilidae
- Genus: Geophilus
- Species: G. tampophor

Binomial name
- Geophilus tampophor (Chamberlin, 1953)

Synonyms
- Brachygeophilus tampophor (Chamberlin, 1953)

Species of centipede in the US

Geophilus tampophor is a species of soil centipede in the family Geophilidae found in Oregon. It was originally placed in the genus Brachygeophilus, however it was later moved to Geophilus. Like G. anonyx, it differs from other western American geophiliids by having prehensorial claws armed at the base, however unlike G. anonyx it possesses armed anal claws and a lesser number of legs.

== Description ==
G. tampophor is yellow in color, 15–20 millimeters long, with 39–47 leg pairs. It is characterized by a prosternum without sclerotic or chitinous lines; clypeus with three pairs of submedian setae, of which the setae of the anterior pair are further apart than those of the median, and those of the median pair further apart than the most posterior; spiracles all circular, last ventral plate moderately wide; coxal pores 5 on each side, the two innermost of which may be partly covered by the ventral plate; anal pores not detected.
