= Geophilus alzonis =

Scientific classification
- Kingdom: Animalia
- Phylum: Arthropoda
- Subphylum: Myriapoda
- Class: Chilopoda
- Order: Geophilomorpha
- Family: Geophilidae
- Genus: Geophilus
- Species: G. alzonis

Binomial name
- Geophilus alzonis (Attems, 1952)

Centipede

Geophilus alzonis is a species of soil centipede in the family Geophilidae found in Monte Alzo near Tolosa in Spain, which it was named after. It's a poorly defined species that was described as being light yellow with a light chestnut brown head and 13–14 mm long, with small but numerous leg bristles, sternites bearing three longitudinal furrows, a carpophagus formation from segments 3–6 to segments 11th-13, and 37-51 leg pairs.
