= Geophilus winnetui =

Scientific classification
- Kingdom: Animalia
- Phylum: Arthropoda
- Subphylum: Myriapoda
- Class: Chilopoda
- Order: Geophilomorpha
- Family: Geophilidae
- Genus: Geophilus
- Species: G. winnetui

Binomial name
- Geophilus winnetui Attems, 1947

Centipede

Geophilus winnetui is a species of soil centipede in the family Geophilidae found in Iowa. It grows up to 48 millimeters long and has 55–63 leg pairs, a well-developed labrum with the middle part having short, strong teeth, pushed backwards by median side parts that almost meet; maxilla with 2 pairs of somewhat blunt external palpi; coxal process not separated, with a number of strong bristles; and presternites undivided and so long that successive sternites are separated.
