= Geophilus cayugae =

Scientific classification
- Kingdom: Animalia
- Phylum: Arthropoda
- Subphylum: Myriapoda
- Class: Chilopoda
- Order: Geophilomorpha
- Family: Geophilidae
- Genus: Geophilus
- Species: G. cayugae

Binomial name
- Geophilus cayugae Chamberlin, 1904

Species of centipede

Geophilus cayugae is a species of soil centipede in the family Geophilidae found in New York, Virginia, and North Carolina. It grows up to 68 millimeters in length, though it averages 25–40, has 57–65 leg pairs in males and 63–67 in females, and is bright whitish yellow in color. G. cayugae can be identified by its well-developed paxilli, weakly consolidated sacculi, and concealed prebasal plate combined with lack of consolidated prebasal areas. It's found beneath rocks and other debris in high elevation montane regions (above 3500 ft. in Virginia).
