= Geophilus atopodon =

Scientific classification
- Kingdom: Animalia
- Phylum: Arthropoda
- Subphylum: Myriapoda
- Class: Chilopoda
- Order: Geophilomorpha
- Family: Geophilidae
- Genus: Geophilus
- Species: G. atopodon

Binomial name
- Geophilus atopodon Chamberlin, 1903

Species of soil centipede

Geophilus atopodon is a species of soil centipede in the family Geophilidae found in Beulah, New Mexico. Its body is uniformly light brown, up to 25 millimeters long and rather thick, narrowed posteriorly (more gradually narrowed anteriorly), with 49–51 leg pairs, a discrete frontal plate, and a long claw of the anal legs.
