= Geophilus pusillus =

Scientific classification
- Kingdom: Animalia
- Phylum: Arthropoda
- Subphylum: Myriapoda
- Class: Chilopoda
- Order: Geophilomorpha
- Family: Geophilidae
- Genus: Geophilus
- Species: G. pusillus

Binomial name
- Geophilus pusillus Meinert, 1870

Species of soil centipede

Geophilus pusillus is a species of soil centipede in the family Geophilidae found in Algeria. It grows up to 11 millimeters in length. The original description of this species is based on ten specimens: five male specimens from Algeria with 31 pairs of legs, and five specimens from Germany (four males with 33 leg pairs and one female with 35 leg pairs). Records from the Alpstein mountains indicate that G. pusillus is a soil-dwelling species (burrowing as deep as 30 cm) that prefers humus-rich soil, but these records deserve confirmation. Some authorities consider the specimens recorded from Europe to be specimens of G. ribauti that have been misidentified as specimens of the Algerian species G. pusillus.
