= Geophilus pusillifrater =

Scientific classification
- Kingdom: Animalia
- Phylum: Arthropoda
- Subphylum: Myriapoda
- Class: Chilopoda
- Order: Geophilomorpha
- Family: Geophilidae
- Genus: Geophilus
- Species: G. pusillifrater

Binomial name
- Geophilus pusillifrater Verhoeff, 1898

Synonyms
- G. pusillus pusillifrater Verhoeff, 1898

Species of soil centipede

Geophilus pusillifrater is a species of soil centipede in the family Geophilidae found in Bosnia-Herzegovina and Britain. It's a relatively small, pale species (up to 13mm in length), prehensorial claws with pointed teeth at the base, distinct chitin lines, and a very broad ventral plate of the pregenital segment. It's at least partially a littoral creature. Males of this species have 39 or 41 pairs of legs; females have 43 leg pairs.
