= Geophilus duponti =

Scientific classification
- Kingdom: Animalia
- Phylum: Arthropoda
- Subphylum: Myriapoda
- Class: Chilopoda
- Order: Geophilomorpha
- Family: Geophilidae
- Genus: Geophilus
- Species: G. duponti

Binomial name
- Geophilus duponti Silvestri, 1897

Species of centipede

Geophilus duponti is a species of centipede in the Geophilidae family. It is endemic to Australia, and was first described in 1897 by Italian entomologist Filippo Silvestri.

== Description ==
The original description is based on a female specimen measuring 55 mm in length with 73 pairs of legs.

== Distribution ==
The species occurs in eastern New South Wales. The type locality is Sydney.

== Behaviour ==
The centipedes are solitary terrestrial predators that inhabit plant litter, soil and rotting wood.
