= Geophilus labrofissus =

Scientific classification
- Kingdom: Animalia
- Phylum: Arthropoda
- Subphylum: Myriapoda
- Class: Chilopoda
- Order: Geophilomorpha
- Family: Geophilidae
- Genus: Geophilus
- Species: G. labrofissus

Binomial name
- Geophilus labrofissus (Verhoeff, 1938)

Centipede

Geophilus labrofissus is a species of soil centipede in the family Geophilidae found on the Balkan Peninsula. It's a poorly defined species of uncertain identity that was first described in Zoologische Jahrbücher. Abteilung für Systematik, Ökologie und Geographie der Tiere. The original description of this species is based on a male specimen measuring 26 mm in length with 59 pairs of legs.
