= Geophilus smithi =

Scientific classification
- Kingdom: Animalia
- Phylum: Arthropoda
- Subphylum: Myriapoda
- Class: Chilopoda
- Order: Geophilomorpha
- Family: Geophilidae
- Genus: Geophilus
- Species: G. smithi

Binomial name
- Geophilus smithi Bollman, 1889

Species of centipede

Geophilus smithi is a species of soil centipede in the family Geophilidae found in Washington, D.C. It grows up to 28 millimeters in length, has 49 leg pairs (in female specimens), 25-30 coxal pores, and coxae of prehensorial legs of about equal length and width.

== Taxonomy ==
In its original description, G. smithi was compared to G. huronicus (now Arenophilus bipuncticeps). G. smithi was possibly based upon specimens of G. ampyx and may even be a senior synonym, though this is not confirmed.
