= Bebekium =

Scientific classification
- Kingdom: Animalia
- Phylum: Arthropoda
- Subphylum: Myriapoda
- Class: Chilopoda
- Order: Geophilomorpha
- Family: Geophilidae
- Genus: Bebekium; Verhoeff, 1941
- Species: B. mirabile

Binomial name
- Bebekium mirabile Verhoeff, 1941

Genus of centipede

Bebekium is a monotypic genus of soil centipede in the family Geophilidae. The only species in this genus is Bebekium mirabile. This centipede is found in Turkey. This centipede is notable for its small size, reaching only 14 mm in length, and modest number of legs, with only 39 pairs in males and 41 pairs in the female. This genus is also distinguished by the absence of pores on the trunk sternites, a trait shared by only one-third of the genera in the family Geophilidae.

== Discovery and distribution ==
This genus and its only species were first described in 1941 by the German zoologist Karl W. Verhoeff. He based the original description of this centipede on a sample of specimens including both sexes. The German zoologist Curt Kosswig found these specimens in his garden in Bebek on the western shore of the Bosporus strait in Turkey, and the genus is named for this type locality. This centipede is known only from the Balkan part of Turkey. Three type specimens, including a male lectotype and one paratype of each sex, are deposited in the Zoologische Staatssammlung München in Munich.

== Description ==
Males of this species feature 39 pairs of legs and can reach 9.5 mm in length, whereas the female features 41 leg pairs and can reach 14 mm in length. Each antenna is twice as long as the head in the female but only slightly longer than the head in males. The head is only slightly longer than wide. The clypeus lacks finely areolate areas. The labrum is divided into three parts, with the middle piece as wide as the side pieces. The labrum lacks any denticles, tubercles, or bristles. Each telopodite of the first maxillae features two segments, and each of the second maxillae features a small claw. The coxosternite of the second maxillae is continuous in the middle.

The coxosternite of the forcipular segment lacks anterior tubercles or denticles. The sutures separating this coxosternite from the adjacent pleurites converge toward the posterior margin. The forcipular tergite is shaped like a trapezoid with a posterior margin that is wider than the anterior margin. This tergite is about as wide as the next tergite. The ultimate article of each of the forcipules features a smooth inner margin without any tooth or tubercle at the base.

The trunk sternites lack pores. The main sternite of the last leg-bearing segment is shaped like a rectangle that is wider than long. The ventral surface of the basal element of each of the ultimate legs (coxopleuron) features four pores, three that open into a common anterior pit and one that opens into a posterior pit. The ultimate legs feature pointed claws in each sex. The ultimate legs of the female are similar to the walking legs, but the ultimate legs of the male are strikingly swollen. No anal pores are visible on the telson.

== Taxonomy ==
Some authorities have expressed doubts about the taxonomic position of this centipede. The close relatives Bebekium and Geophilus share enough traits to suggest that Bebekium may be a junior synonym of Geophilus, a genus that is also found in Europe and Turkey. For example, in both genera, the head and the forcipular segment are at most slightly longer than wide, the coxosternite of the second maxillae is continuous in the middle, and the forcipular tergite is about as wide as the following tergite. Furthermore, in both genera, the forcipular coxosternite lacks denticles, the main sternite of the last leg-bearing segment is wider than long, and each of the ultimate legs features a claw.

The genera Bebekium and Geophilus can be distinguished, however, based on other traits. For example, the pores on the coxopleuron open into two pits in Bebekium but open separately in Geophilus. Furthermore, the ultimate article of the forcipule features a basal denticle in Geophilus but not in Bebekium, and the main sternite of the last leg-bearing segment is shaped like a rectangle in Bebekium but like a trapezoid in Geophilus. Moreover, the middle part of the labrum features tubercles in Geophilus but not in Bebekium.

The genus Bebekium also shares an especially extensive set of traits with another genus in the family Geophilidae, Zygona, which contains only the North American species Z. duplex. For example, in both of these genera, the trunk sternites lack pores, the pores on each coxopleuron open into two pouches, and each of the ultimate legs features a pointed claw. Furthermore, in both genera, the forcipules are only slightly elongated, the forcipular coxosternite lacks anterior tubercles, the sutures between the forcipular coxosternite and pleurites obviously converge toward the posterior, the forcipular tergite is not evidently narrower than the following tergite, and the ultimate article of the forcipule lacks a basal tubercle. Moreover, in both of these centipedes, each telopodite of the first maxillae features two articles, and the second maxillae feature claws.

The genera Bebekium and Zygona can be distinguished, however, based on other traits. For example, the middle part of the labrum features stout teeth or tubercles in Zygona but not in Bebekium. Furthermore, the sternite of the last leg-bearing segment is shaped like a rectangle in Bebekium but like a trapezoid in Zygona, and anal pores are visible on the telson in Zygona but not in Bebekium. Moreover, the species Z. duplex is a larger centipede, reaching 33 mm in length, and features more legs (53 pairs) than the species B. mirabile.
