= Geophilus aenariensis =

Scientific classification
- Kingdom: Animalia
- Phylum: Arthropoda
- Subphylum: Myriapoda
- Class: Chilopoda
- Order: Geophilomorpha
- Family: Geophilidae
- Genus: Geophilus
- Species: G. aenariensis

Binomial name
- Geophilus aenariensis (Verhoeff, 1942)

Centipede

Geophilus aenariensis is a species of soil centipede in the family Geophilidae found in the southern Italian Peninsula. It has a body length of up to 22 millimeters, around 47 leg pairs in females and 51 in males, an absence of anal pores and bristles on the lateral part of the labrum, a distinct carpophagus pit, a small but pointed pretarsus of the second maxillae, and 3-5 coxal pores in each coxopleuron with no isolated coxal pores.
