= Geophilus nicolanus =

Scientific classification
- Kingdom: Animalia
- Phylum: Arthropoda
- Subphylum: Myriapoda
- Class: Chilopoda
- Order: Geophilomorpha
- Family: Geophilidae
- Genus: Geophilus
- Species: G. nicolanus

Binomial name
- Geophilus nicolanus Chamberlin, 1940

Species of centipede

Geophilus nicolanus is a species of soil centipede in the family Geophilidae found on San Nicholas Island, California. It's dark brown in color and grows up to 62 millimeters long, with 63 leg pairs, a concealed prebasal plate, numerous coxal pores, and a very wide final ventral plate with convex sides.

== Related Species ==
G. nicolanus closely resembles G. becki, but differs by its color, lack of anal pores, by having the last tergite strongly convex instead of posteriorly truncate, and by having the prehensorial claws unarmed at the base.
