= Geomerinus =

Scientific classification
- Kingdom: Animalia
- Phylum: Arthropoda
- Subphylum: Myriapoda
- Class: Chilopoda
- Order: Geophilomorpha
- Family: Geophilidae
- Genus: Geomerinus; Brolemann, 1912

Type species
- Geophilus curtipes Haase, 1887

Genus of centipedes

Geomerinus is a monotypic genus of centipedes in the family Geophilidae. It was described by French myriapodologist Henry Wilfred Brolemann in 1912. Its sole species is Geomerinus curtipes, originally described as Geophilus curtipes by Erich Haase in 1887. It is endemic to Australia.

== Description ==
This species features an elongate head and elongate forcipules, very small claws on the second maxillae, and no sternal pores; the ultimate leg-bearing segment has a narrow metasternite, scattered coxal pores, and legs with a single tarsal article. The original description of this species by Haase is based on a female specimen measuring 45 mm in length with 71 pairs of legs. The description by Brolemann is based on a larger female specimen measuring 67 mm in length, also with 71 leg pairs.

== Distribution ==
The species occurs in north-eastern coastal Queensland and south-eastern coastal New South Wales.

== Behaviour ==
The centipedes are solitary terrestrial predators that inhabit plant litter, soil and rotting wood.
