= Geophilus electricus =

Scientific classification
- Kingdom: Animalia
- Phylum: Arthropoda
- Subphylum: Myriapoda
- Class: Chilopoda
- Order: Geophilomorpha
- Family: Geophilidae
- Genus: Geophilus
- Species: G. electricus

Binomial name
- Geophilus electricus (Linnaeus, 1758)

Synonyms
- Scolopendra electrica Linnaeus, 1758

Species of soil centipede

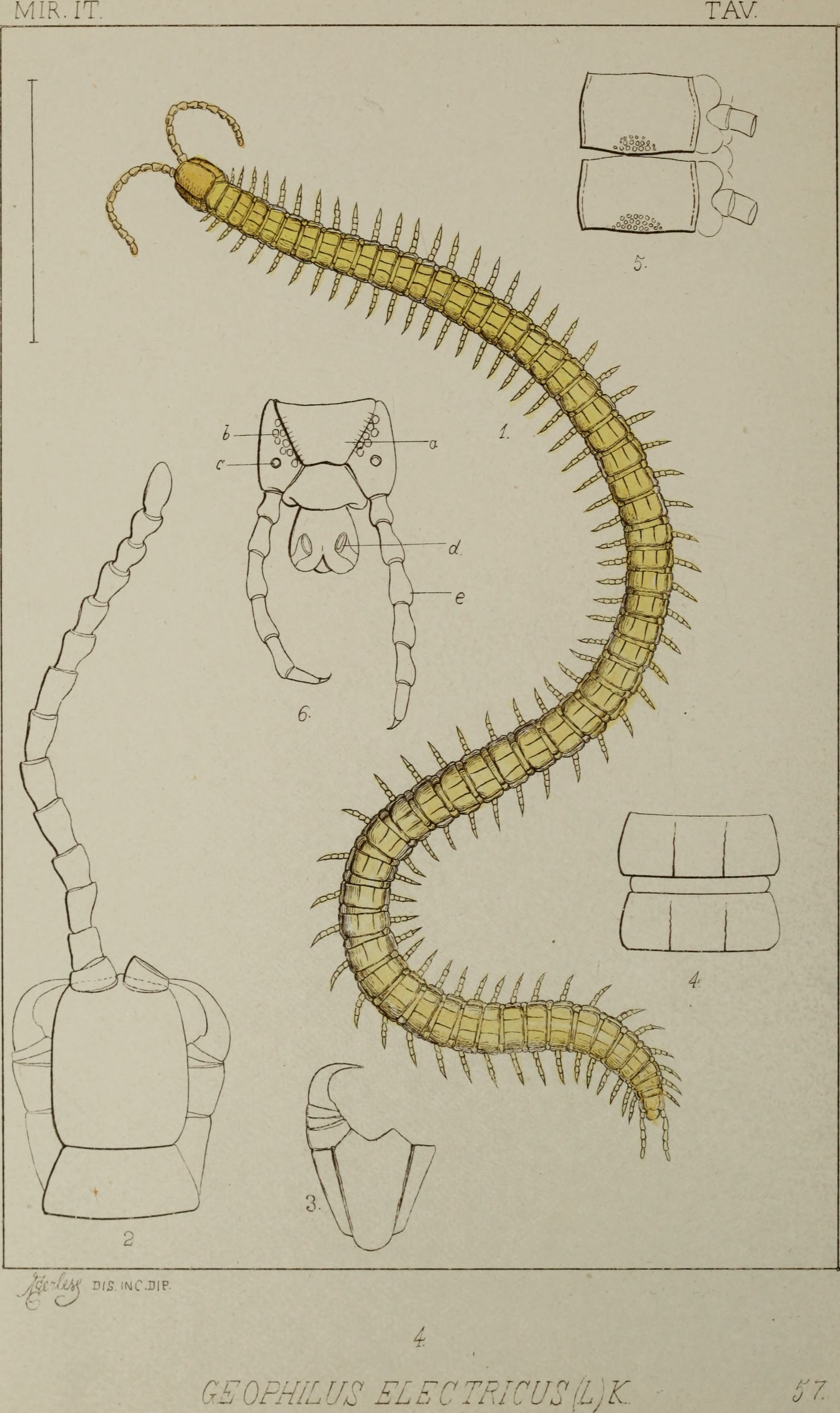
Illustration from 1882

Geophilus electricus, the electric geophilus, is a species of soil centipede in the family Geophilidae found across temperate Europe, especially Britain and Ireland. Originally discovered and named Scolopendra electrica in 1758, it was later moved to its own genus, Geophilus. As the first species described in this genus, it is considered by some to be the type species (along with Geophilus carpophagus). It is yellowish-orange in color and can grow up to 45 millimeters, with 55 to 75 leg pairs (more than other similar Geophilus species), a distinct carpophagus fossae on the anterior sternites, and a distinctive arrangement of the coxal pores of the last leg pair. Like many geophilomorphans, G. electricus has been known to glow in the dark, most likely as a defensive maneuver.

== Habitat ==
G. electricus is found at altitudes below 400ft, and is partially a soil-dwelling species, living within 10 cm below the ground or in the layer of leaf litter on top. It prefers gardens and arable land, making it mostly synanthropic, but has no bias toward inland or coastal sites. Its preferred soil types are clay, loam, and sandy.
