= Geophilus admarinus =

Scientific classification
- Kingdom: Animalia
- Phylum: Arthropoda
- Subphylum: Myriapoda
- Class: Chilopoda
- Order: Geophilomorpha
- Family: Geophilidae
- Genus: Geophilus
- Species: G. admarinus

Binomial name
- Geophilus admarinus Chamberlin, 1952

Synonyms
- Brachygeophilus admarinus (Chamberlin, 1952)

Species of centipede

Geophilus admarinus is a species of soil centipede in the family Geophilidae. It's found in southeast Alaska under stones near the low tide mark and is capable of surviving prolonged submersion underwater.

== Description ==
G. admarinus grows to about 25 millimeters in length and has around 47 leg pairs. It's characterized by a head longer than it is wide; first maxillae with palpus and inner process both conically pointed and each having typically 5 setae on its ventral face; smooth claws of the second maxillae; concave labrum; median division straight or slightly concave, bearing 5 long, basally dark teeth, and lateral division pectinate; syncoxite bearing a lappet on each side; coxae broadly united with no trace of a median suture; unarmed prosternum of poison claws with an absence of chitin lines and minute teeth at the base; and an absence of ventral pores.
