= Geophilus bosniensis =

Scientific classification
- Kingdom: Animalia
- Phylum: Arthropoda
- Subphylum: Myriapoda
- Class: Chilopoda
- Order: Geophilomorpha
- Family: Geophilidae
- Genus: Geophilus
- Species: G. bosniensis

Binomial name
- Geophilus bosniensis Verhoeff, 1895

Species of centipede

Geophilus bosniensis, the Bosnian geophilus, is a species of soil centipede in the family Geophilidae endemic to Bosnia and Herzegovina. It grows up to 30 millimeters and has 75 leg pairs, as well as sternites unseparated in the median but with a suture line, and sternal pore areas in the trunk segments only. Overall, the identity and phyletic position of this centipede are uncertain.

== Related species ==
Geophilus strictus Latzel, 1880 is similar to G. bosniensis, but differs in that it has fewer hairs, a longer cephalic plate, a lack of anal leg claws, and pleural glands which "open in a pit covered by the last ventral shield". G. hirsutus Porat, 1871 (now Necrophloeophagus punctiventris Newport, 1844) corresponds to G. bosniensis in the strong bristles, but differs slightly from it in the very long cephalic plate, the final, narrow anal plate, and the large number (about 50) of pleural glands.
