= Geophilus rhomboideus =

Scientific classification
- Kingdom: Animalia
- Phylum: Arthropoda
- Subphylum: Myriapoda
- Class: Chilopoda
- Order: Geophilomorpha
- Family: Geophilidae
- Genus: Geophilus
- Species: G. rhomboideus

Binomial name
- Geophilus rhomboideus Takakuwa, 1937

Species of centipede

Geophilus rhomboideus is a species of soil centipede in the family, Geophilidae found in Japan. It grows up to 30 millimeters in length; the males have about 43 leg pairs, while the females have, 49.
