= Geophilus erzurumensis =

Scientific classification
- Kingdom: Animalia
- Phylum: Arthropoda
- Subphylum: Myriapoda
- Class: Chilopoda
- Order: Geophilomorpha
- Family: Geophilidae
- Genus: Geophilus
- Species: G. erzurumensis

Binomial name
- Geophilus erzurumensis (Chamberlin, 1952)

Species of centipede

Geophilus erzurumensis is a species of soil centipede in the family Geophilidae found only in Erzurum, Turkey, which it is named after. The original description of this species is based on a single male specimen measuring 15 mm in length with 41 pairs of legs.

== Taxonomy ==
G. erzurumensis was originally placed in the genus Brachygeophilus based on its lack of sternal pores. It may be a synonym of Pachymerium ferrugineum, along with Geophilus orientis, G. eudontus, and G. elazigus.
