= Geophilus alaskanus =

Scientific classification
- Kingdom: Animalia
- Phylum: Arthropoda
- Subphylum: Myriapoda
- Class: Chilopoda
- Order: Geophilomorpha
- Family: Geophilidae
- Genus: Geophilus
- Species: G. alaskanus

Binomial name
- Geophilus alaskanus Cook, 1904

Species of soil centipede

Geophilus alaskanus is a species of soil centipede in the family Geophilidae found in Alaska. It bears similarities to Mecistocephalus attenuatus, however unlike M. attenuatus, it has oblong cephalic lamina, unarmed coxae, and unarmed claw at base. G. alaskanus is dull orange-brown in color, grows to about 30 millimeters, and has 53 leg pairs (in male specimens) with the first pair being very small and the last pair being distinctly larger than the others. It also possesses coalesced frontal lamina, unexposed basal lamina broader than the cephalic, a prehensorial sternum that's broader than it is long, distinct lateral grooves, obsolete prosternal teeth, a smooth, bare dorsal surface except for two faint impressed lines, and a small pleurae of the last segment marked with 8–10 pigmented pores of which the posterior one of the ventral face is larger than the others and sunk in a deep cavity.
