= Geophilus angustatus =

Scientific classification
- Kingdom: Animalia
- Phylum: Arthropoda
- Subphylum: Myriapoda
- Class: Chilopoda
- Order: Geophilomorpha
- Family: Geophilidae
- Genus: Geophilus
- Species: G. angustatus

Binomial name
- Geophilus angustatus Eschscholtz, 1823

Species of centipede

Geophilus angustatus is a species of soil centipede in the family Geophilidae found on the Aleutian Islands. It's dark red, with 41–43 leg pairs; the antennae are cylindrical and about twice as long as the feet. Like other geophilomorphs, the antennae are 14-segmented. Its name comes from Latin 'angustatum', meaning 'narrowed', referring to its anteriorly narrowed body.
