= Geophilus brunneus =

Scientific classification
- Kingdom: Animalia
- Phylum: Arthropoda
- Subphylum: Myriapoda
- Class: Chilopoda
- Order: Geophilomorpha
- Family: Geophilidae
- Genus: Geophilus
- Species: G. brunneus

Binomial name
- Geophilus brunneus McNeill, 1887

Species of centipede

Geophilus brunneus is a species of soil centipede in the family Geophilidae found in Bloomington Township, Monroe County, Indiana. It grows up to 23mm long and has an olive brown body, deep orange head segment, and light orange caudal segment, as well as between 47 leg pairs (in males) and 49 (in females), pitted posterior coxae, one very small tooth on the mandibles, and generally enlarged caudal legs in the male. The scutum (sclerite just behind the head) is irregularly punctate, somewhat anteriorly narrowed, and slightly broader in the female than the male; the episcutal sutures are plain and have a greener tinge than the rest of the back.
