= Geophilus becki =

Scientific classification
- Kingdom: Animalia
- Phylum: Arthropoda
- Subphylum: Myriapoda
- Class: Chilopoda
- Order: Geophilomorpha
- Family: Geophilidae
- Genus: Geophilus
- Species: G. becki

Binomial name
- Geophilus becki Chamberlin, 1823

Species of centipede

Geophilus becki is a species of soil centipede in the family Geophilidae found in Cabrillo Beach, California near San Pedro under rocks and kelp at the water's edge. It grows up to 50 millimeters long and is generally orange-yellow in color with clear yellow legs and 61–63 leg pairs.

== Etymology ==
The name comes from Dr. D. Elden Beck, who collected the first known specimen.

== Related Species ==
G. becki closely resembles G. nicolanus, but differs in the presence of anal pores, by having the last tergite posteriorly truncate instead of strongly convex, and by having the prehensorial claws armed at the base.
