= Geophilus proximus =

Scientific classification
- Kingdom: Animalia
- Phylum: Arthropoda
- Subphylum: Myriapoda
- Class: Chilopoda
- Order: Geophilomorpha
- Family: Geophilidae
- Genus: Geophilus
- Species: G. proximus

Binomial name
- Geophilus proximus C.L. Koch, 1847

Species of soil centipede

Geophilus proximus is a species of soil centipede in the family Geophilidae found in the northern part of the Palearctic and widespread across the entire Baltic basin, though it reaches as far as the Arctic Circle and has been introduced through human agency to northern, central, and eastern parts of Kazakhstan. It was recorded once with certainty in Britain from Unst in the Shetland Islands; distribution in the rest of Europe is difficult to assess because of frequent misidentifications of the species. Populations from northern Europe are mostly parthenogenetic.

== Description ==
G. proximus grows up to 40 millimeters and is yellowish-orange in color, very similar in appearance to G. impressus (more commonly known as G. insculptus or G. alpinus), though it has a more distinct clypeus, less teeth on the mid-piece labrum, triangular sternal pore area, and a more rounded shape of the metasternite of the last trunk segment. It has a maximum length of 4 centimeters and a head 1.2 times longer than it is wide as well as forcipular incomplete chitin-lines, with males usually having between 45 and 51 leg-bearing segments and females between 47 and 55.

The first maxillae has two pairs of lateral processes and the second maxillae has a pointed claw without any notch at mid-length; G. proximus also possesses one median clear area on the anterior part of clypeus, labrum with two distinct side-pieces with hair-like projections, and a median part of labrum with about 2-4 teeth. The sternal pores are grouped on a transversal band on the posterior half of each sternum of the anterior third of the trunk, with about 10 pores close to the internal ventral margin of each coxopleuron of the last pair of legs, which bear a pointed claw.

== Habitat ==
G. proximus is an endogeic species that prefers soil under grass growing along the coast; in the far north of Norway it inhabits forests, open land, and mountains at an altitude of up to 600 meters above sea level. It's one of the few Geophilomorphs inhabiting the Kola peninsula, where it was recorded mainly in the humus debris layer under herbaceous birch and spruce forests on the south and southeast slopes of the Hibiny Mountain Massive.
