= Geophilus glaber =

Scientific classification
- Kingdom: Animalia
- Phylum: Arthropoda
- Subphylum: Myriapoda
- Class: Chilopoda
- Order: Geophilomorpha
- Family: Geophilidae
- Genus: Geophilus
- Species: G. glaber

Binomial name
- Geophilus glaber Bollman, 1887

Species of centipede

Geophilus glaber is a species of soil centipede in the family Geophilidae found beneath logs and other debris in California. It grows up to 53 millimeters long, with a discrete frontal plate, large anal pores, and slender feet of the last legs. The female of this species has 53 or 55 pairs of legs.
