= Geophilus pygmaeus =

Scientific classification
- Kingdom: Animalia
- Phylum: Arthropoda
- Subphylum: Myriapoda
- Class: Chilopoda
- Order: Geophilomorpha
- Family: Geophilidae
- Genus: Geophilus
- Species: G. pygmaeus

Binomial name
- Geophilus pygmaeus Latzel, 1880

Synonyms
- G. carnicus Verhoeff, 1928; G. cispadanus Silvestri, 1896; G. larii Verhoeff, 1934

Species of centipede

Geophilus pygmaeus, the pygmy geophilus, is a species of soil centipede in the family Geophilidae found in the Southern Limestone Alps, between the Bergamasque Prealps in the west and the Slovene Prealps in the east, and in the northernmost Dinarides. Past records from other areas are usually false. G. pygmaeus is less than 20 millimeters long and has 41–47 leg pairs. It differs from other European species of Geophilus by the shape of the forcipular apparatus and arrangement of coxal pores.
