= Geophilus bluncki =

Scientific classification
- Kingdom: Animalia
- Phylum: Arthropoda
- Subphylum: Myriapoda
- Class: Chilopoda
- Order: Geophilomorpha
- Family: Geophilidae
- Genus: Geophilus
- Species: G. bluncki

Binomial name
- Geophilus bluncki Verhoeff, 1928

Species of centipede

Geophilus bluncki is a species of soil centipede in the family Geophilidae found in San Remo, Italy. It grows up to 23 millimeters in length; the males have about 61 leg pairs. The uniform pore fields and long antennae resemble Arctogeophilus glacialis, formerly Geophilus glacialis.
