= Geophilus aztecus =

Scientific classification
- Kingdom: Animalia
- Phylum: Arthropoda
- Subphylum: Myriapoda
- Class: Chilopoda
- Order: Geophilomorpha
- Family: Geophilidae
- Genus: Geophilus
- Species: G. aztecus

Binomial name
- Geophilus aztecus Humbert & De Saussure, 1869

Species of centipede

Geophilus aztecus is a species of soil centipede in the family Geophilidae found in Mexico and Guatemala. The original description of this species is based on a dark red specimen measuring 44 mm in length with antennae moniliform at the apex. This species can reach 52 mm in length and has 57 or 59 pairs of legs.

== Taxonomy ==
As Geophilus is a holarctic genus, G. aztecus has almost certainly been misidentified, but as of now has not been correctly reassigned.
