= Schizonampa =

Scientific classification
- Kingdom: Animalia
- Phylum: Arthropoda
- Subphylum: Myriapoda
- Class: Chilopoda
- Order: Geophilomorpha
- Family: Geophilidae
- Genus: Schizonampa; Chamberlin, 1914

Type species
- Schizonampa manni Chamberlin, 1914

Species
- Schizonampa africana; Schizonampa angolana; Schizonampa barberi; Schizonampa libera; Schizonampa manni

Genus of centipedes

Schizonampa is a genus of soil centipedes in the family Geophilidae. This genus contains five species. These centipedes are found in tropical and subtropical regions of the Americas and Africa.

== Discovery, taxonomy, and distribution ==
This genus was first proposed in 1914 by the American biologist Ralph V. Chamberlin to contain the newly discovered species S. manni, which he explicitly designated as the type species for this genus. He based the original descriptions of this genus and this species on a female specimen collected by the American zoologist William M. Mann and the American naturalist Fred Baker in 1911 in the state of Pará in Brazil. Parts of this holotype are deposited in the form of a slide at the Museum of Comparative Zoology at Harvard University.

In 1951, Chamberlin described a second species of Schizonampa, S. angolana, based on a sample of eleven specimens including both sexes. The Portuguese biologist António de Barros Machado collected these specimens in 1948 and 1949 from two sites in Angola. In 1958, the German myriapodologist Otto Kraus described a third species, S. africana, based on sixteen specimens found in 1947 and 1948 at three different sites in what is now the Democratic Republic of the Congo.

In 1964, the American myriapodologist Ralph E. Crabill, Jr., of the Smithsonian Institution described a series of sixteen specimens collected between 1891 and 1895 in Liberia. He believed these specimens to be the syntypes for the Liberian centipede Schizotaenia prognatha, the type species for the genus Schizotaenia. Finding these specimens similar to Schizonampa manni, he deemed Schizonampa to be a junior synonym of Schizotaenia.

In 1965, however, Chamberlin concluded that the centipedes described by Crabill were a new species of Schizonampa rather than specimens of Schizotaenia prognatha. Rejecting the synonymy proposed by Crabill, he placed the species described by Crabill in the genus Schizonampa under the name S. prognatha. In 2000, the biologists Donatella Foddai, Luis Alberto Pereira, and Alessandro Minelli proposed a new name, Schizonampa libera, to replace the homonym Schizonampa prognatha. Authorities now accept Schizonampa libera as the valid name for the centipedes described in 1964 by Crabill.

In 2019, the French biologists Étienne Iorio and Mathieu Coulis described a fifth species of Schizonampa, S. barberi. They based the original description of this species on a female holotype and eighteen paratypes (including another female, five males, and juveniles). They collected these specimens from 2016 to 2018 from four sites in Martinique. The holotype and a male paratype, both found in 2016 in the commune of Fond-Saint-Denis, are deposited in the Muséum National d’Histoire Naturelle in Paris. In 2020, three more specimens were collected from another site in Martinique.

== Description ==
Centipedes in this genus range from about 1 cm to about 2 cm in length. These centipedes can feature from 37 to 51 pairs of legs. Adults of the largest species, S. barberi, range from 20 mm to 24 mm in length. This species also features the most legs, ranging from 45 to 51 pairs. The other four species in this genus reach no more than 15 mm in length and feature no more than 43 leg pairs. The species S. libera is notable for its small size, reaching only 11 mm in length, and features 43 leg pairs in the female and 41 or 43 pairs in males. The fewest legs are recorded in S. manni, with only 37 pairs in the female holotype, and S. angolana, with 37 pairs in males and 39 pairs in females. The species S. africana features 41 leg pairs in all specimens.

The head in this genus is elongated, with a length/width ratio ranging from 1.4 to 1.5. Lappets project from the telopodites of the first maxillae, and denticles project from the anterior corners on the lateral margins of the first two articles of the second maxillae. The sternum of the second maxillae is separated into two coxosternites that are connected in the middle by only a narrow thin membrane. The forcipules are elongated, extending well beyond the front of the head, and feature denticles on the inner margins. The forcipular tergite is shaped like a trapezoid. The sternites do not feature fields of pores. Each of the penultimate legs features a normal claw at the distal end, like the claws on the other walking legs, but each of the ultimate legs lacks a claw. The basal element of each of the ultimate legs (coxopleuron) features two to four pores. Each of the ultimate legs features seven articles beyond the coxopleuron, with a small article at the distal end.

== Species ==
This genus includes the following five species:

- Schizonampa africana Kraus, 1958
- Schizonampa angolana Chamberlin, 1951
- Schizonampa barberi Iorio & Coulis, 2019
- Schizonampa libera Foddai, Pereira & Minelli, 2000
- Schizonampa manni Chamberlin, 1914
