= Nesomerium =

Scientific classification
- Kingdom: Animalia
- Phylum: Arthropoda
- Subphylum: Myriapoda
- Class: Chilopoda
- Order: Geophilomorpha
- Family: Geophilidae
- Genus: Nesomerium; Chamberlin, 1953

Type species
- Nesomerium hawaiiense Chamberlin, 1953

Genus of centipedes

Nesomerium is a monotypic genus of centipedes in the family Geophilidae. It was described in 1953 by American myriapodologist Ralph Vary Chamberlin. The sole species is Nesomerium hawaiiense Chamberlin, 1953. Since the original description of this species based on a single specimen, no other specimens have been referred to this species or this genus, and some authorities express doubts about the validity of these taxa and their placement in the family Geophilidae.

== Description ==
This species features elongate forcipules with denticles, sternal pores in a posterior transverse band, a single ventral pore on each coxopleuron, and ultimate legs without claws; the lateral parts of the labrum almost touch medially, and the mandibles appear to have more than one pectinate lamella. The original description of this species is based on a male specimen measuring about 45 mm in length with 69 pairs of legs.

== Distribution ==
The species occurs in the Hawaiian Islands.
