= Purcellinus =

Scientific classification
- Kingdom: Animalia
- Phylum: Arthropoda
- Subphylum: Myriapoda
- Class: Chilopoda
- Order: Geophilomorpha
- Family: Geophilidae
- Genus: Purcellinus; Attems, 1926
- Species: P. robustus

Binomial name
- Purcellinus robustus Attems, 1928

Genus of centipede

Purcellinus is a monotypic genus of soil centipede in the family Geophilidae. The only species in this genus is Purcellinus robustus. This centipede is found in South Africa. This species can feature either 39 or 41 pairs of legs and can reach 28 mm in length.

== Discovery ==
This species was first described in 1928 by the Austrian myriapodologist Carl Attems. He based the original description of this species on a sample of specimens including both sexes. These specimens were found in eight different locations in South Africa, including on Table Mountain above Kirstenbosch National Botanical Garden, Signal Hill, Cape Flats, Retreat, Clanwilliam, and Caledon. Two syntypes are deposited in the Natural History Museum in Vienna, including a female from Table Mountain in Cape Town and a slide with parts of a specimen from Retreat.

== Description ==
This centipede features a stout body and ranges from 26 mm to 28 mm in length. This species can feature either 39 or 41 leg pairs in each sex. Small specimens are pale yellow, whereas larger specimens are a darker brownish yellow, and the head is only slightly darker than the body.

The dorsal plate on the head is much longer than wide and features no frontal line. The entire clypeus is reticulated. The labrum features three parts: a middle piece with three short triangular teeth and two lateral pieces with long fringes. The mandible features a single row of pectinate teeth. Each telopodite of the first maxillae is divided only indistinctly into two articles. Minute lappets project from the lateral margins of these telopodites, but no lateral lobes project from the coxosternite of the first maxillae. Each of the second maxillae ends in a simple claw.

The anterior margin of the forcipular sternite features two small brown teeth. The ultimate article of the forcipule is a claw with a small tooth at the base, but the other articles lack teeth. Each sternite features a deep longitudinal furrow down the middle. Pores appear on the ventral surface starting as a small rounded field in the middle of the first sternite, then becoming a narrow transverse band in front of the posterior margin of the next sternites, then dividing in the middle of the sternites that follow, at first indistinctly, then more clearly into two distinct parts.

Each of the ultimate legs feature seven articles and end in a claw. The ultimate legs are thicker in males, with dense hair on the ventral surface of the first six articles and sparse bristles on the most distal article, whereas in females, these legs feature only sparse bristles on all articles. The basal element of each of the ultimate legs feature numerous pores scattered on the ventral and lateral surfaces but no pores on the posterior part or the dorsal surface. The telson features anal pores.
