= Nesonyx =

Scientific classification
- Kingdom: Animalia
- Phylum: Arthropoda
- Subphylum: Myriapoda
- Class: Chilopoda
- Order: Geophilomorpha
- Family: Schendylidae
- Genus: Nesonyx; Chamberlin, 1923
- Species: N. flagellans

Binomial name
- Nesonyx flagellans Chamberlin, 1923

Genus of centipede

Nesonyx is a monotypic genus of soil centipede in the family Schendylidae. The only species in this genus is Nesonyx flagellans. This genus is among the few genera in the family Schendylidae without any pores on the basal element of each of the ultimate legs (coxopleuron). This centipede is found in Mexico. This species features 55 pairs of legs in each sex and measures about 26 mm in length.

== Discovery ==
This genus and its only species were first described in 1923 by the American biologist Ralph V. Chamberlin. He based the original description of this centipede on a male holotype and a female allotype. He collected these two specimens in 1921 from under stones on Georges Island in the Gulf of California in Mexico. The allotype is deposited in the California Academy of Sciences in San Francisco, but the holotype is now missing.

== Description ==
This centipede features 55 leg pairs in both sexes and can reach about 26 mm in length. The head is only slightly longer than wide, with convex sides and a straight posterior margin. The antennae are shaped like threads. The labrum is well developed and discrete except for the middle, where the labrum and the clypeus are continuous. The labrum features about 24 teeth, including 15 arranged in an arc in the middle. These teeth are long, pale, and shaped like slender cones, with the lateral teeth more acutely pointed than those in the middle.

The dentate lamella of the mandible is divided into three blocks, usually with three long pale teeth in each block. The first maxillae feature long slender lappets, and the claws of the second maxillae feature combs on both margins. The forcipules lack teeth, and the claws are slender and do not reach the front of the head when the forcipules are closed. The forcipular sternum lacks chitin lines.

Pores appear on anterior trunk sternites, with a few pores arranged in a small circular area on each sternite. Each of the ultimate legs ends in a normal claw but lacks pores on the coxopleuron. The ultimate legs in the male are densely covered with fine short hairs on the ventral surfaces and are thicker than in the female, which features more slender ultimate legs and short hairs that are restricted to the more proximal articles.

This centipede shares many traits with other species in the family Schendylidae. For example, as in other species in this family, the head is slightly longer than wide, the antennae are slender, and the claws of the second maxillae are fringed with rows of filaments. Furthermore, as in most species in this family, fields of pores appear on the sternites. Unlike most genera in this family, however, this centipede lacks pores on the coxopleura.

The genus Nesonyx shares this unusual absence of coxal pores with another genus in the same family, Haploschendyla. Furthermore, like most species of Haploschendyla, the species N. flagellans features a dentate lamella on the mandible divided into three blocks, lappets on the first maxillae, claws on the second maxillae with bristles on both edges, and pores on the sternites. The genera Nesonyx and Haploschendyla can be distinguished, however, based on other traits. For example, each of the ultimate legs ends in a claw in Nesonyx but not in Haploschendyla.
