= Geophilus varians =

Scientific classification
- Kingdom: Animalia
- Phylum: Arthropoda
- Subphylum: Myriapoda
- Class: Chilopoda
- Order: Geophilomorpha
- Family: Geophilidae
- Genus: Geophilus
- Species: G. varians

Binomial name
- Geophilus varians McNeill, 1887

Synonyms
- G. legiferens (Chamberlin, 1909)

Species of soil centipede

Geophilus varians is a species of soil centipede in the family Geophilidae found in North America, particularly from South Carolina to Indiana, Ohio, Pennsylvania, and Virginia. It grows up to 40 millimeters, though it averages 30–35, ranges in color from light faded orange to yellow or whitish yellow with a deeper and brighter head, and has 53–59 leg pairs in males and 55–61 in females, as well as a complete lack of consolidated paxilli and sacculi (sensory organs in the antennae of certain insects), concealed prebasal plate, and unusually long ultimate legs.
