= Takakuwa =

Takakuwa (written: 高桑) is a Japanese surname. Notable people with the surname include:

- Daijiro Takakuwa (高桑 大二朗; born 1973), Japanese footballer
- Ken Takakuwa (高桑 健; born 1985), Japanese swimmer
- Yosioki Takakuwa (1873–1960), Japanese myriapodologist
