= Mecistocephalus apator =

Scientific classification
- Kingdom: Animalia
- Phylum: Arthropoda
- Subphylum: Myriapoda
- Class: Chilopoda
- Order: Geophilomorpha
- Family: Mecistocephalidae
- Genus: Mecistocephalus
- Species: M. apator

Binomial name
- Mecistocephalus apator Chamberlin, 1920

Species of centipede

Mecistocephalus apator is a species of soil centipede in the Mecistocephalidae family. This centipede features 49 pairs of legs and can reach almost 35 mm in length. This species is found in Indonesia and Micronesia.

== Discovery ==
This species was first described in 1920 by the American myriapodologist Ralph Vary Chamberlin. He based the original description of this species on three specimens. These specimens were found by the German biologist Hans Fruhstorfer in 1896 at an elevation of 5,000 feet on Mount Bawakraeng on the Indonesian island of Sulawesi. One specimen is deposited in the Museum of Comparative Zoology at Harvard University. Another specimen is deposited in the National Museum of Natural History of the Smithsonian Institution in Washington, D.C.

== Description ==
This species can approach 35 mm in length and features 49 leg pairs. The body is mainly reddish yellow but orange in the anterior region, and the head and forcipules are blackish. The head is 1.85 times longer than wide and features straight anterior and posterior margins. The posterior margins of the side pieces of the labrum are rounded in the inner corners and do not project beyond the adjacent middle piece. The mandible features seven lamellae, with six stout teeth on the first lamella and twelve long teeth on a middle lamella. The outside corners at the front of the coxosternite of the first maxillae are expanded out to the sides and form acute angles pointing forward.

The forcipule features two teeth on the first article: a proximal tooth that is low, broad, and rounded and a longer distal tooth. The second article features a small tooth, and the third article features a larger tooth, but the ultimate article features no distinct tooth at the base. The sternites feature a longitudinal furrow that is not distinctly forked at the anterior end. The sternite of the last leg-bearing segment is shaped like a trapezoid that is narrower at the posterior end. The basal element of each of the ultimate legs features about 25 pores that are of moderate size and well separated.

This species exhibits many traits that characterize the genus Mecistocephalus. For example, like other species in this genus, this species features a head that is evidently longer than wide, a transverse frontal line on the dorsal surface of the head, a longitudinal suture dividing the coxosternite of the first maxillae down the middle, an undivided coxosternite of the second maxillae, and a groove on the sternites of the trunk segments. Furthermore, like other species in this genus, this species also features spicula on the pleurites on each side of the head.

This species shares more distinctive traits with another species in the same genus, M. modestus, which is also found in Indonesia. For example, each of these species features 49 leg pairs, a head that is almost twice as long as wide, a straight anterior margin on the head, and forcipules with two teeth on the first article. Furthermore, in both species, each lamella on the mandible features a row of teeth that extends all the way to the base, the posterior margin of the labrum is completely devoid of bristles, the middle piece of the labrum is shaped like a narrow triangle with a vertex at the posterior end, the spicula are straight rather than curved like hooks, and the groove on the sternites is not forked.

The species M. apator can be distinguished from M. modestus, however, based on other traits. For example, the ultimate legs feature more pores in M. apator, which features about 25 pores on each leg, where M. modestus features only 15 to 17 pores. Furthermore, the mandible features more teeth in M. apator, which features seven lamellae on the mandible, with twelve teeth on a middle lamella, whereas M. modestus features five or six lamellae on the mandible, with only seven teeth on a middle lamella.

== Distribution ==
The species M. apator is found not only on the island of Sulawesi in Indonesia but also in Micronesia. In Micronesia, this species has been recorded in the Federated States of Micronesia, the Northern Marinana Islands, and Palau.
