= Geophilus truncorum =

Scientific classification
- Kingdom: Animalia
- Phylum: Arthropoda
- Subphylum: Myriapoda
- Class: Chilopoda
- Order: Geophilomorpha
- Family: Geophilidae
- Genus: Geophilus
- Species: G. truncorum

Binomial name
- Geophilus truncorum Bergsøe & Meinert, 1866

Synonyms
- Brachygeophilus truncorum; Geophilus pusillimus

Species of centipede

Geophilus truncorum is a species of soil centipede in the family Geophilidae found across Western Europe, though it reaches as far as Poland, Italy, and Morocco. This centipede is relatively small, growing up to 20mm in length, with a yellow or orangeish brown body and dark yellow or brown head, denser and shorter hair than most Geophilus species, a main plate almost as elongated as in G. flavus (115:100), and distinct carpophagus fossae on the anterior sternites. Males of this species have 35 to 41 pairs of legs; females have 37 to 41.

== Habitat ==
G. truncorum is most often found beneath bark, leaf litter, and in dead and decaying wood, particularly in pine Pinus woodland, and oak Quercus woodland, though there seems to be no strong preference for woodland types. It's also found at coastal sites and moorland, where it is associated with bracken. It has only a slight bias toward inland habitats (51.4% inland vs. 48.6% coastal). Although most records are from ruraI sites, it can be also be found in more populated areas, though rarely inside buildings. G. truncorum lives in altitudes up to 2000 ft and shows a marked tendency to appear within 3m above ground. Its preferred soil types are sandy/pure sand (about 29.9% of specimens found in sandy soil), clays (28.5%), peat (23.9%), and loam (17.9%); 33.8% are found in calcareous (calcium-carbonate rich) soil, 66.2% in non—calcareous soil.

== Taxonomy ==
G. truncorum was originally considered the type species of Brachygeophilus based on its lack of sternal pores. It also bears a similarity to Schendyla nemorensis, though unlike this species, G. truncorum possesses carpophagus fossae and claws on its last legs.
