= Mixophilus =

Scientific classification
- Kingdom: Animalia
- Phylum: Arthropoda
- Subphylum: Myriapoda
- Class: Chilopoda
- Order: Geophilomorpha
- Family: Geophilidae
- Genus: Mixophilus; Silvestri, 1929
- Species: M. indicus

Binomial name
- Mixophilus indicus Silvestri, 1929

Genus of centipede

Mixophilus is a monotypic genus of soil centipede in the family Geophilidae. The only species in this genus is Mixophilus indicus. This centipede is notable for its unusual habitat: This species is found in estuarine sediments and is the only species in the order Geophilomorpha recorded with a littoral habitat in India. This species can reach 61 mm in length and can feature either 55 or 57 pairs of legs.

== Discovery, distribution, and ecology ==
This genus and its only species were first described in 1929 by the Italian zoologist Filippo Silvestri. He based the original description of this genus and species on six specimens (five males and one female). These specimens were first collected in 1928 from a piece of land surrounded by water in the southern arm of the Cooum River at Chennai in India. This land was surrounded by water 2.5 feet deep to a distance of 10 to 12 feet on all sides. These centipedes were found coiled in loose soft mud where fishermen searched for polychaete worms of the genus Syllis.

Later more specimens were collected from heaps of soil sticking out of the water closer to the Napier bridge. Fishermen had created these piles of soil while digging for polychaete worms of the genus Marphysa. These piles were no closer than three feet to the shore.

After sea water pumped into the river flooded the first and second sites where these centipedes were collected, more specimens were found on shore among amphipods and isopods in very loose sand at the mouth of crab burrows between the minimum and maximum water levels. These centipedes probably search for food at night and seek shelter at the mouth of crab burrows, where they can find scraps of food left behind by crabs. This centipede has apparently adapted to an unusual diet as well as an unusual habitat, feeding on the flesh of polychaete worms. Since the original description of this species, more specimens have been collected, not only from the Cooum River bed but also the estuarine region along the Adayar River in Chennai.

== Respiration ==
Like other marine centipedes, Mixophilus can survive for days submerged in water. Laboratory experiments with Mixophilus specimens of various sizes indicate that smaller and younger centipedes can survive longer under water than larger and older centipedes. Experiments also suggest that Mixophilus survives under water by absorbing some oxygen from the water through the cuticle. Measurements of the pH level in the blood of Mixophilus specimens submerged in water reveal an increase in acidity, suggesting that these centipedes survive by relying on anaerobic metabolism, which increases carbonic and lactic acids in the blood, as well as cutaneous respiration. These centipedes cannot survive indefinitely under water, however, and must clear the oxygen debt upon exposure to the air again.

After removal from water, Mixophilus temporarily increases the uptake of oxygen, peaking after three hours in smaller specimens and five hours in larger specimens. This centipede achieves this increase in oxygen uptake by pumping a larger volume of air into the tracheal system. Allowed to recover after three days under water, for example, Mixophilus expands and contracts its main longitudinal tracheal trunks rhythmically at a rate reaching 22 to 25 pulsations per minute. This rate is slower after a shorter period under water. The normal rate of pulsation without any submergence is only three to five pulsations per minute.

The terrestrial centipede Himantarium samuelraji does not exhibit these tracheal pulsations, suggesting that a typical terrestrial centipede does not need this ventilation mechanism, which evidently reflects an adaptation for aquatic life. A comparison with H. samuelraji also reveals structural differences in the longitudinal tracheal trunks: These trunks are narrow tubes of uniform diameter in H. samuelraji but are markedly swollen in the middle in M. indicus. These swollen tubes resemble the air sacs of locusts.

== Reproduction ==
Like other centipedes, Mixophilus uses spermatophores to transfer sperm from the male to the female. Large numbers of Mixophilus spermatophores can be collected on the shores of the Island Ground in Chennai. Males of this species also produce spermatophores in the laboratory. These spermatophores are a faint yellow and range from 1.5 mm to 1.7 mm in length. The spermataphores are oval like chicken eggs rather than laterally compressed like the spermatophores of a typical terrestrial centipede. These spermataphores also lack the longitudinal cleft on one side from which the sperm emerge in the typical terrestrial centipede species.

The spermatophores of Mixophilus float on the surface of water and release small air bubbles if crushed under water, whereas those of other centipedes sink in water and do not release air when crushed. The walls of the Mixophilus spermatophores apparently contain air pockets that keep these spermatophores afloat. This special adaptation for aquatic life allows females to pick up floating spermatophores from the water surface, where Mixophilus centipedes also feed.

== Description ==
This species ranges from 20 mm to 61 mm in length. Males can have either 55 or 57 pairs of legs, and females have 57 leg pairs. The body is a pale brown, but the head and forcipules are more yellow or orange, with black claws at the end of the forcipules. The body narrows slightly at the anterior and posterior ends.

The head is small and narrows slightly in front. The labrum is small and features four teeth in the middle. The mandibles each feature a single lamella like a comb with very short slender teeth set closely in a row. The first maxillae each feature two articles, with the second article longer than the first and bearing a seta on the ventral surface. The coxosternite of the second maxillae is entire rather than divided. The second maxillae each feature three articles and end in a distinct claw. The forcipules are short, each with a long first article but very short second and third articles. The forcipules each end in a long curved claw with a small tooth at the base.

The sternites feature sparse and short setae, and starting with the first leg-bearing segment, the posterior area of the sternite features a transverse band of pores. This field of pores is entire on the anterior segments until the 17th segment, when the field divides in the middle into two lateral groups. The field remains divided on the posterior segments, and pores gradually become less numerous: The 17th segment features about 70 pores, but the penultimate leg-bearing segment features two groups of only nine pores each. The legs are short and each end in a claw.

The sternite of the ultimate leg-bearing is shaped like a trapezoid and lacks pores. The basal element of each of the ultimate legs features numerous pores that open into a common pit near the sternite. The ultimate legs each feature seven articles including a terminal claw. The ultimate legs are slightly longer than the preceding legs and slightly more slender in the female than in the male. The telson features anal pores.

== Taxonomy ==
This genus shares many traits with other centipedes in the family Geophilidae. For example, like other centipedes in this family, Mixophilus features mandibles that each bear a single pectinate lamella. Furthermore, as is common in this family, the sternite of the second maxillae in Mixophilus is undivided, and the sternites of the leg-bearing segments feature pores.

This genus shares an especially extensive set of traits with the genus Tuoba, another genus in the same family that is also found in estuarine habitats. These genera are so similar that some authorities suggest that Mixophilus is a junior synonym of Tuoba and propose Tuoba indica as a new name for Mixophilus indicus. For example, in both of these genera, each of the second maxillae ends in a simple claw that is reduced in size, the ultimate article of each forcipule features a denticle at the base, and the walking legs feature a notably elongate ultimate article. Furthermore, in both of these genera, the sternite of the ultimate leg-bearing segment is shaped like a trapezoid that is wider than long, and each of the ultimate legs ends in a simple claw and features multiple coxal organs opening into a single pit.

Centipedes in the genus Mixophilus can be distinguished from their close relatives in the genus Tuoba, however, based on other traits. For example, the side pieces of the labrum feature tubercles or feathery setae in Tuoba but not in Mixophilus. Furthermore, the first maxillae feature cuticular spines projecting from the external corners in Tuoba but not in Mixophilus. Moreover, the clypeus features four pairs of setae in the middle with three or four setae on each side in Mixophilus but only three pairs of setae in the middle with two to four setae on each side in Tuoba. References list Mixophilus as a valid genus with M. indicus as its only species.
