= Mecistocephalus uncifer =

Scientific classification
- Kingdom: Animalia
- Phylum: Arthropoda
- Subphylum: Myriapoda
- Class: Chilopoda
- Order: Geophilomorpha
- Family: Mecistocephalidae
- Genus: Mecistocephalus
- Species: M. uncifer

Binomial name
- Mecistocephalus uncifer (Silvestri, 1919)

Synonyms
- Lamnonyx uncifer Silvestri, 1919

Species of centipede

Mecistocephalus uncifer is a species of soil centipede in the Mecistocephalidae family. This centipede is found on the island of New Guinea. This species has 49 pairs of legs and can reach 65 mm in length.

== Discovery and distribution ==
This species was first described in 1919 by Italian myriapodologist Filippo Silvestri. He based the original description of this species on specimens found at an elevation of 1,300 meters in Moroka in Central Province in Papua New Guinea. This species is known only from Papua New Guinea.

== Taxonomy ==
Silvestri originally described this species under the name Lamnonyx uncifer. In 1920, however, the American biologist Ralph V. Chamberlin placed this species in the genus Dasyptyx instead. Authorities now deem both Lamnonyx and Dasyptyx to be junior synonyms of Mecistocephalus.

== Description ==
This species features 49 leg pairs and can reach 65 mm in length and 2.6 mm in width. The body is yellow with a darker back and a reddish brown head. The dorsal plate on the head is nearly twice as long as wide. The mandible features 12 to 15 pectinate lamellae (comb blades). The first article of the forcipule feature two large teeth that are curved backwards like hooks, the second article features a small tooth, and the third article features a tooth that is also curved like a hook. The first pair of legs are less than half as long as the second pair. The sternites feature a forked groove. The sternite of the last leg-bearing segment is shaped like a long trapezoid and features dense but short bristles on the posterior part. The basal element of each of the ultimate legs feature numerous pores, some small and some larger, but with no single pore that is especially large. The ultimate legs are more than twice as long as the penultimate legs.

This species exhibits many traits that characterize the genus Mecistocephalus. For example, like other species in this genus, this species features not only a head that is evidently longer than wide but also a groove on the sternites of the trunk segments. Furthermore, like other species in this genus, this species features a longitudinal suture dividing the coxosternite of the first maxillae down the middle, an undivided coxosternite of the second maxillae, and second maxillae that reach beyond the first maxillae.

This species shares more distinctive traits with another species in the same genus, M. subgigas, which is also found in Papua New Guinea. For example, each of these species features 49 leg pairs, a head that is almost twice as long as wide, forcipules with two teeth on the first article, and a forked groove on the sternites. Furthermore, in both of these species, each of the lamellae on the mandible bears teeth only at the distal end and features a long stalk bearing a row of setae instead of teeth. Authorities placed both M. subgigas and M. uncifer in the taxon Dasyptyx, first proposed as a genus, then deemed a subgenus, based on this feature of the mandible.

The species M. uncifer can be distinguished from M. subgigas, however, based on other traits. For example, the basal element of each of the ultimate legs features one pore that is distinctly larger than all the others in M. subgigas but not in M. uncifer. Furthermore, the teeth on the first article of the forcipule are large and curved like hooks in M. uncifer but not in M. subgigas.
