= Geophilus intermissus =

Scientific classification
- Kingdom: Animalia
- Phylum: Arthropoda
- Subphylum: Myriapoda
- Class: Chilopoda
- Order: Geophilomorpha
- Family: Geophilidae
- Genus: Geophilus
- Species: G. intermissus

Binomial name
- Geophilus intermissus Silvestri, 1935

Species of centipede

Geophilus intermissus is a species of soil centipede in the family Geophilidae found in India around the Himalayas. The original description of this species is based on a female specimen measuring 35 mm in length, with 57 pairs of legs, a yellowish red anterior, and especially thin tarsi on the last leg pair.
