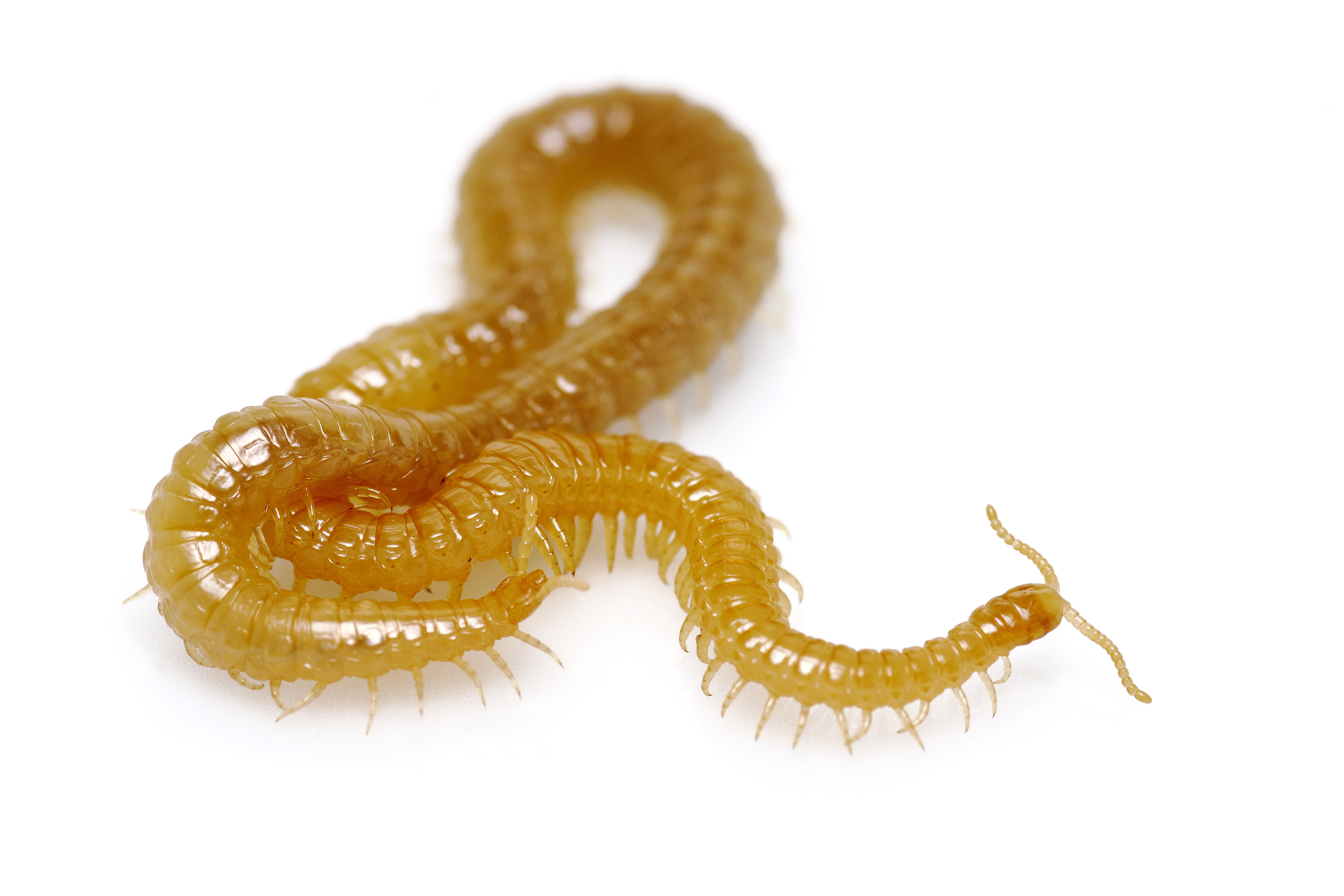

Scientific classification
- Kingdom: Animalia
- Phylum: Arthropoda
- Subphylum: Myriapoda
- Class: Chilopoda
- Order: Geophilomorpha
- Family: Himantariidae
- Genus: Haplophilus
- Species: H. subterraneus

Binomial name
- Haplophilus subterraneus (Shaw, 1794)

Synonyms
- Scolopendra subterranea Shaw, 1789

= Haplophilus subterraneus =

Species of centipede

Haplophilus subterraneus, commonly known as the western yellow centipede is a species of centipede in the family Himantariidae that can be found in Central Europe, Ireland, Newfoundland, Scandinavia and the United Kingdom. It was recorded from a compost heap of the Botanical Garden at the University of Oslo at Tøyen, Oslo in 1992 and 1995.

It was for some time known as Stigmatogaster subterranea, but the name was reverted back to Haplophilus subterraneus in 2014.

== Description ==
It is fairly large, measuring up to, and sometimes exceeding, 70 mm in length. It has 77 to 83 leg pairs.

== Distribution ==
Haplophilus subterraneus is widespread in central and eastern Europe, along with the British isles, and has also been introduced to Newfoundland and New York. It is common in woods and grassland habitats, and is also commonly found in gardens and other synanthropic habitats.

== Morphological anomalies ==
Several papers have reported high levels of morphological anomalies in H. subterraneus. One study found that on average, 30% of individuals may have some kind of anatomical deformity.

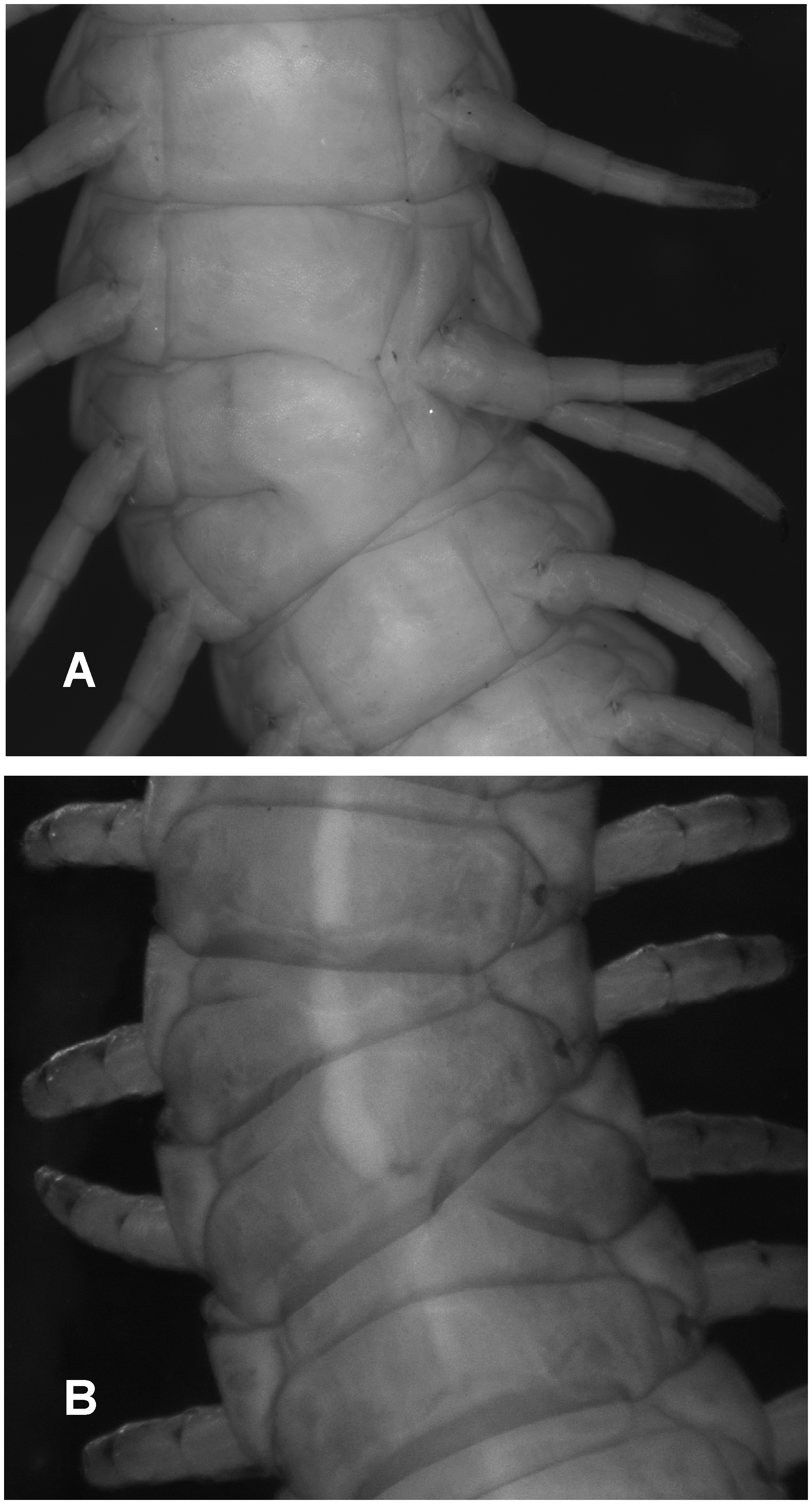
Trunk deformities.
