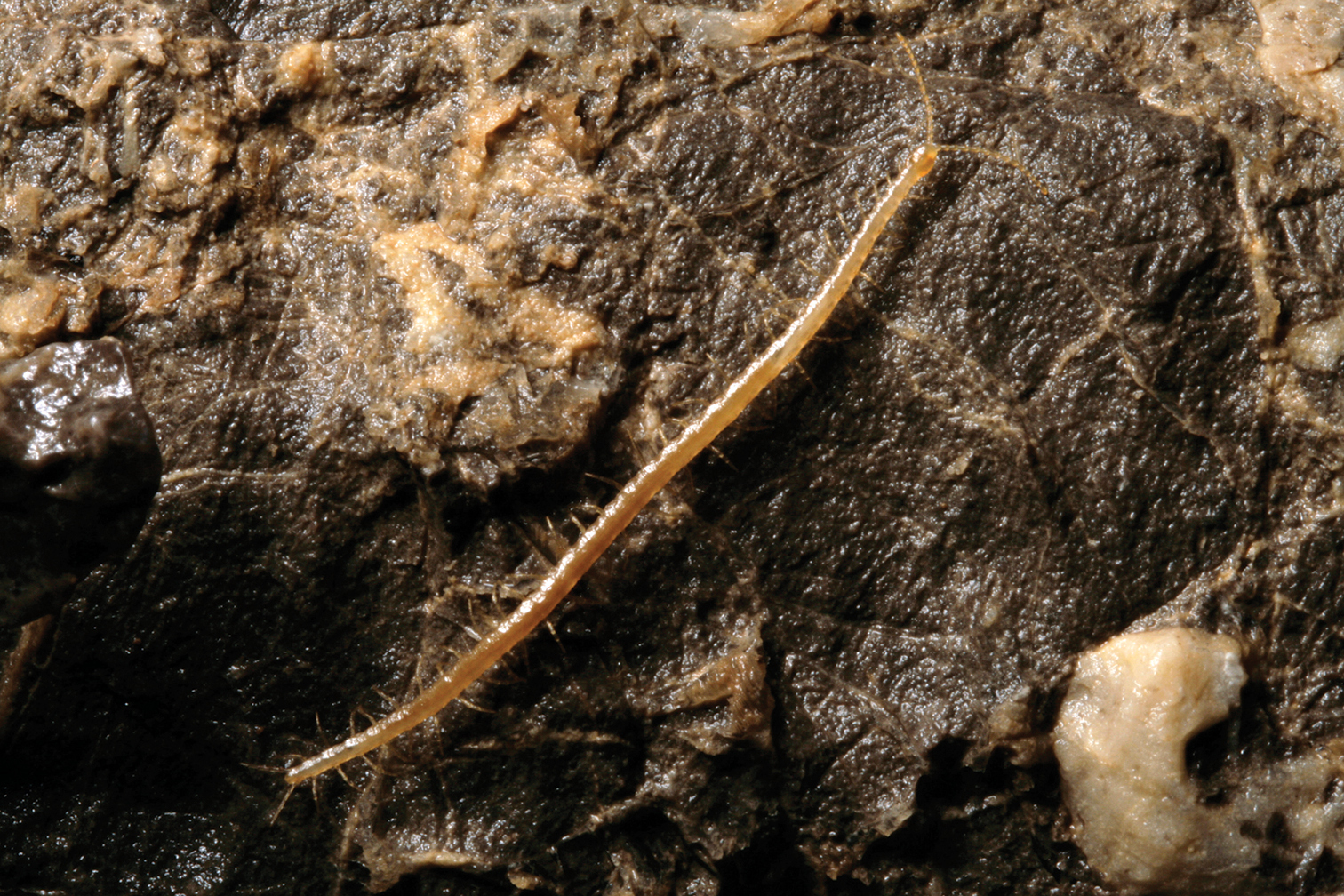

Scientific classification
- Kingdom: Animalia
- Phylum: Arthropoda
- Subphylum: Myriapoda
- Class: Chilopoda
- Order: Geophilomorpha
- Family: Geophilidae
- Genus: Geophilus
- Species: G. hadesi

Binomial name
- Geophilus hadesi Stoev et al., 2015

= Geophilus hadesi =

Species of centipede

Geophilus hadesi is a species of soil centipede in the family Geophilidae. This centipede is a troglobite, spending its entire life cycle in a cave environment. This species and Geophilus persephones are the only two troglobites known in the genus Geophilus and among the few known in the order Geophilomorpha. The species G. hadesi is named after Hades, god of the underworld in Greek mythology and the husband of Persephone, the namesake of the first troglomorphic species (adapted to life in caves) discovered among the soil centipedes. The species G. hadesi has been observed in a cave as far as 1,100 meters below the surface, the deepest underground that any centipede has ever been recorded.

== Discovery ==
This species was first described in 2015 by a team of biologists led by the Bulgarian myriapodologist Pavel Stoev of the National Museum of Natural History in Sofia, Bulgaria. The original description of this species is based on three specimens collected by biospeleologists in 2011 from three different caves in the Velebit mountains in Croatia. The first specimen collected, a female holotype, was found 250 meters underground in the Munižaba cave. The second, a female paratype, was found 500 meters underground in the Muda Labudova cave. The third, a male specimen, was found 980 meters underground in the Lukina jama cave, the 15th deepest cave in the world. Another specimen was seen in the same cave at a depth of about 1,100 meters but could not be collected.

== Description ==
Like other soil centipedes, this species is blind, has a flattened body, and is well adapted to life underground. This species also exhibits troglomorphic features, such as elongated appendages (including long antennae, walking legs, and ultimate legs), as well as elongated trunk segments and unusually long claws on its legs. The female specimens range from about 22 mm in length (in the paratype) to a maximum length of 28 mm (in the holotype); the male specimen measures 27 mm in length. Specimens of both sexes have only 33 pairs of legs.

The forcipules feature only a single small denticle, located at the base of the ultimate article. The metasternites in the anterior part of the trunk, except for the first segment, feature pits on the anterior margin. The posterior margin of the metasternites features a field of pores, with these pore-fields forming a single transverse band on each metasternite in the anterior half of the trunk but dividing into two groups in the posterior half of the trunk.

This species shares many traits with other centipedes in the genus Geophilus. For example, each of the ultimate legs ends in a claw, and the ventral side of these legs features pores, with most of these coxal pores close to the adjacent sternite. Furthermore, the coxosternite of the second maxillae is entire rather than divided, and the coxosternite of the forcipular segment features incomplete chitin-lines. Moreover, as in many species in the same genus, the anterior trunk metasternites feature anterior pits and posterior pore-fields in the form of transverse bands.

Two other species in the genus Geophilus resemble G. hadesi most closely: G. persephones and G. piae, which share a number of distinctive traits with G. hadesi. These traits include a modest number of legs: G. persephones has 29 leg pairs (in the only recorded specimen, a male), and G. piae can have as few as 35 pairs in males and 37 pairs in females. All three species also feature sternal pore-fields that extend to the posterior parts of the trunk. Traits shared by these three species also include second maxillae that end in a stout tubercle with a small tip instead of a curved article that tapers gradually. Furthermore, the species G. persephones and G. hadesi also share troglomorphic features, such as long antennae and legs.

The species G. hadesi, however, is larger than either G. persephones, which measures only 16.2 mm in length, or G. piae, which reaches only 11 mm in length. The other two species may also be distinguished from G. hadesi by the pattern of coxal pores on ventral side of the ultimate legs: In G. hadesi, one pore is isolated in a distinctive position posterior to the other pores.
