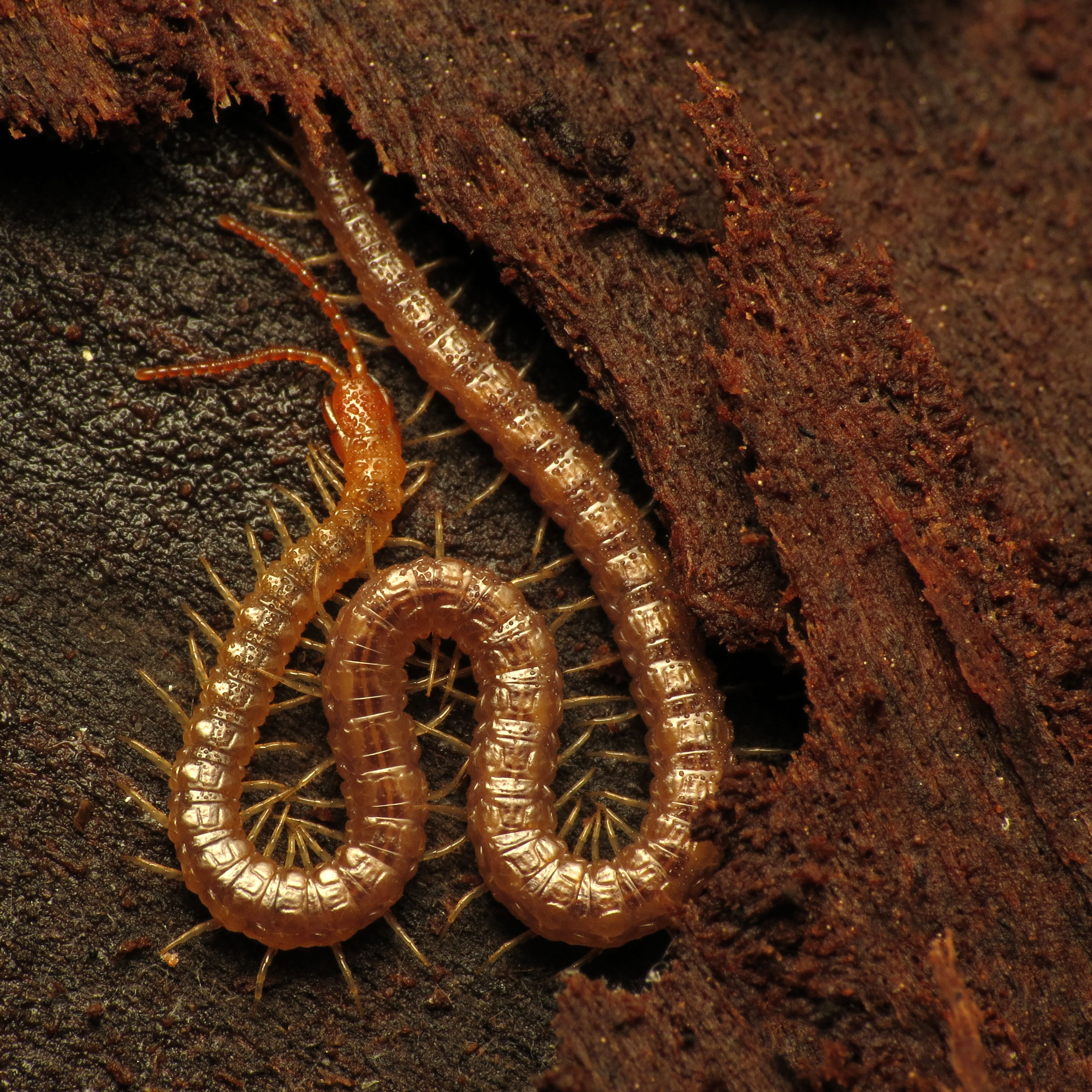

Scientific classification
- Kingdom: Animalia
- Phylum: Arthropoda
- Subphylum: Myriapoda
- Class: Chilopoda
- Order: Geophilomorpha
- Family: Geophilidae
- Genus: Geophilus; Leach, 1814

= Geophilus =

Genus of centipedes

Geophilus (from Ancient Greek γεω- (geo-), meaning "earth", and φίλος (phílos), meaning "lover") is a large, heterogeneous genus of soil centipedes in the family Geophilidae largely considered to be synonymous with Brachygeophilus. The generic name first appeared in Brewster's Edinburgh Encyclopaedia in 1814 as Geophilus electricus. This genus has a Holarctic distribution.

== Description ==
This genus is characterized by a claw-shaped ultimate pretarsus, complete or nearly complete coxo-pleural sutures at the prosternum, and incomplete chitin-lines. Centipedes in this genus feature slightly elongate heads and labral intermediate parts with tubercles, the forcipules are usually poorly elongate with a single small tubercle at the base of each tarsungulum, and the anterior trunk metasternites usually have an anterior medial socket and a posterior transversally elongate pore-field.

Centipedes in this genus range from about 1 cm to about 8 cm in length. Several species in this genus are notable for their small sizes, including G. minimus (measuring 9.5 mm in length), G. pinivagus (10 mm), G. richardi (10 mm), G. pusillus (11 mm), and G. piae (11 mm). Other species are notable for their large sizes, including G. procerus (measuring 72 mm in length) and G. piedus (75 mm).

Although centipedes in this genus can have as many as 89 pairs of legs (in G. caucasicus, with 57 to 89 leg pairs), most species in this genus have a much smaller number of legs. For example, two species in this genus include centipedes with only 29 leg pairs, the lowest number recorded in the family Geophilidae: G. persephones (29 in the only specimen, a male) and G. richardi (29 or 31 in males and 33 in females). Several other species in this genus are known from specimens with notably few leg pairs in each sex, including G. ribauti (as few as 31 in males and 33 in females), G. hadesi (33 in both sexes), G. piae (as few as 35 in males and 37 in females), and G. bipartitus (35 in males and 39 in females).

== Species ==
This genus is the largest in the family Geophilidae, with about 140 species:

- Geophilus admarinus Chamberlin, 1952
- Geophilus aenariensis Verhoeff, 1942
- Geophilus aetnensis Verhoeff, 1928
- Geophilus alaskanus Cook, 1904
- Geophilus algarum Brölemann, 1909
- Geophilus alzonis Attems, 1952
- Geophilus ampyx Crabill, 1954
- Geophilus angustatus Eschscholtz, 1823
- Geophilus anonyx Chamberlin, 1941
- Geophilus arenarius Meinert, 1870
- Geophilus atopodon Chamberlin, 1903
- Geophilus aztecus Humbert and Saussure, 1869
- Geophilus becki Chamberlin, 1951
- Geophilus bipartitus Takakuwa, 1937
- Geophilus bluncki Verhoeff, 1928
- Geophilus bobolianus Verhoeff, 1928
- Geophilus bosniensis Verhoeff, 1895
- Geophilus brevicornis Wood, 1862
- Geophilus brunneus McNeill, 1887
- Geophilus carpophagus Leach, 1814
- Geophilus caucasicus Sseliwanoff, 1884
- Geophilus cayugae Chamberlin, 1904
- Geophilus chalandei Brölemann, 1909
- Geophilus challangeri Pocock, 1891
- Geophilus claremontus Chamberlin, 1909
- Geophilus compactus Attems, 1934
- Geophilus crenulatus Silvestri, 1936
- Geophilus delotus Chamberlin, 1941
- Geophilus dentatus Takakuwa, 1936
- Geophilus duponti Silvestri, 1897
- Geophilus easoni Arthur et al. 2001
- Geophilus elazigus Chamberlin, 1952
- Geophilus electricus Linne,1758
- Geophilus embius Chamberlin, 1912
- Geophilus erzurumensis Chamberlin, 1952
- Geophilus eudontus Chamberlin, 1952
- Geophilus flavus De Geer, 1778
- Geophilus fossularum Verhoeff, 1943
- Geophilus fossuliferus Karsch, 1884
- Geophilus foveatus McNeill, 1887
- Geophilus frigidanus Verhoeff, 1928
- Geophilus fruitanus Chamberlin, 1928
- Geophilus fucorum Brölemann, 1900
- Geophilus gavoyi Chalande, 1910
- Geophilus geronimo Chamberlin, 1912
- Geophilus gigas Attems, 1951
- Geophilus glaber Bollman, 1887
- Geophilus glyptus Chamberlin, 1902
- Geophilus gracilis Meinert, 1870
- Geophilus guanophilus Verhoeff, 1939
- Geophilus hadesi Stoev et al. 2015
- Geophilus honozus Chamberlin, 1952
- Geophilus ibericus Attems, 1952
- Geophilus impressus C.L. Koch, 1847
- Geophilus indianae McNeill, 1887
- Geophilus infossulatus Attems, 1901
- Geophilus intermissus Silvestri, 1935
- Geophilus joyeuxi Léger and Duboscq, 1903
- Geophilus judaicus Verhoeff, 1934
- Geophilus kobelti Attems, 1903
- Geophilus koreanus Takakuwa, 1936
- Geophilus labrofissus Verhoeff, 1938
- Geophilus lanius Brölemann, 1896
- Geophilus leionyx Chamberlin, 1938
- Geophilus lemuricus Verhoeff, 1939
- Geophilus longicapillatus Verhoeff, 1937
- Geophilus madeirae Latzel, 1895
- Geophilus marginatus Lucas, 1849
- Geophilus minimus Verhoeff, 1928
- Geophilus monoporus Takakuwa, 1934
- Geophilus mordax Meinert, 1886
- Geophilus multiporus Miyosi, 1955
- Geophilus mustiquensis Pocock, 1893
- Geophilus nanus Attems, 1952
- Geophilus nasintus Chamberlin, 1909
- Geophilus naxius Verhoeff, 1901
- Geophilus nealotus Chamberlin, 1902
- Geophilus nesiotes Attems, 1903
- Geophilus nicolanus Chamberlin, 1940
- Geophilus occidentalis Linnaeus, 1758
- Geophilus okolonae Bollman, 1888
- Geophilus oligopus Attems, 1895
- Geophilus orae Verhoeff, 1943
- Geophilus oregonus Chamberlin, 1941
- Geophilus orientalis Seliwanoff, 1881
- Geophilus orientis Chamberlin, 1952
- Geophilus osquidatum Brölemann, 1909
- Geophilus oweni Brölemann, 1887
- Geophilus parki Auerbach, 1954
- Geophilus pauciporus Machado, 1952
- Geophilus pellekanus Attems, 1903
- Geophilus persephones Foddai & Minelli, 1999
- Geophilus phanus Chamberlin, 1943
- Geophilus piae Minelli, 1983
- Geophilus piedus Chamberlin, 1930
- Geophilus pinivagus Verhoeff, 1928
- Geophilus polyporus Takakuwa, 1942
- Geophilus procerus C. L. Koch, 1878
- Geophilus promontorii Verhoeff, 1928
- Geophilus proximus C.L.Koch, 1847
- Geophilus punicus Silvestri, 1896
- Geophilus pusillifrater Verhoeff, 1898
- Geophilus pusillus Meinert, 1870
- Geophilus pygmaeus Latzel, 1880
- Geophilus pyrenaicus Chalande, 1909
- Geophilus readae Jones, 2001
- Geophilus regnans Chamberlin, 1904
- Geophilus rex Chamberlin, 1912
- Geophilus rhomboideus Takakuwa, 1937
- Geophilus ribauti Brölemann, 1908
- Geophilus richardi Brölemann, 1904
- Geophilus ridleyi Pocock, 1890
- Geophilus rouncei Jones, 2001
- Geophilus secundus Chamberlin, 1912
- Geophilus serbicus Stojanović, Mitić, Antić, 2019
- Geophilus setiger Bollman, 1887
- Geophilus seurati Brölemann, 1924
- Geophilus shoshoneus Chamberlin, 1925
- Geophilus sibiricus Stuxberg, 1876
- Geophilus silesiacus Haase, 1881
- Geophilus simoporus Chamberlin, 1952
- Geophilus smithi Bollman, 1889
- Geophilus sounkyoensis Takakuwa, 1937
- Geophilus strictus Latzel, 1880
- Geophilus strigosus McNeill, 1887
- Geophilus studeri Rothenbühler, 1899
- Geophilus tampophor Chamberlin, 1953
- Geophilus tenellus L. Koch, 1882
- Geophilus tenuiculus C. L. Koch, 1878
- Geophilus terranovae Palmén, 1954
- Geophilus transitus Chamberlin, 1941
- Geophilus trichopus Muralewicz, 1926
- Geophilus truncorum Bergsøe and Meinert, 1866
- Geophilus ungviculatus Daday, 1889
- Geophilus varians McNeill, 1887
- Geophilus venezuelae Silvestri, 1897
- Geophilus vinciguerrae Silvestri, 1895
- Geophilus virginiensis Bollman, 1889
- Geophilus vittatus Raffinesque, 1820
- Geophilus winnetui Attems, 1947
- Geophilus yavapainus Chamberlin, 1941
