= Diamondback soil centipede =

Scientific classification
- Kingdom: Animalia
- Phylum: Arthropoda
- Subphylum: Myriapoda
- Class: Chilopoda
- Order: Geophilomorpha
- Family: Geophilidae
- Genus: Geophilus
- Species: G. vittatus

Binomial name
- Geophilus vittatus Rafinesque, 1820

Synonyms
- G. cephalicus Wood, 1862; G. deducens Chamberlin, 1909; G. laevis Wood, 1862; G. rubens Say, 1821

Species of centipede

Geophilus vittatus, also known as the diamondback soil centipede, is a species of soil centipede in the family Geophilidae widespread in North America and named for the dark band of diamond-shaped markings across its back. G. vittatus grows up to 52 millimeters in length, though it averages 25–40, and ranges from brown- to orange-yellow in color, with 49–53 leg pairs in females, 49–51 leg pairs in males, and a lack of consolidated carpophagus structures. It can be found under any debris on the forest floor, but mostly under loose bark and occasionally near the sea.

== Taxonomy ==
G. rubens' (Say, 1821) synonymy with G. vittatus was proved by Hoffman & Crabill (1953), and was originally very likely based on a specimen of Strigamia bidens.

== Behavior ==
When threatened, G. vittatus will secrete poisons from its underside. The secretion is proteinaceous and contains two cyanogenetic compounds, mandelonitrile and benzoyl cyanide, as well as two products derived from these compounds as a result of hydrogen cyanide production (benzaldehyde and benzoic acid). Benzoyl cyanide has not been previously recorded from a natural source.
