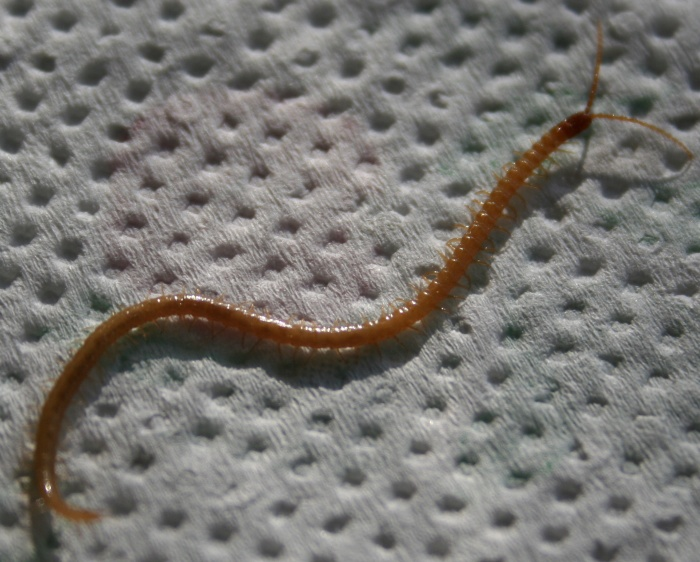

Scientific classification
- Kingdom: Animalia
- Phylum: Arthropoda
- Subphylum: Myriapoda
- Class: Chilopoda
- Order: Geophilomorpha
- Family: Geophilidae
- Genus: Geophilus
- Species: G. flavus

Binomial name
- Geophilus flavus (De Geer, 1778)

Synonyms
- Geophilus longicornis; Necrophloeophagus longicornis; Scolopendra flava De Geer, 1778 (basionym)

= Geophilus flavus =

Species of centipede

Geophilus flavus, the yellow geophilus, is a terrestrial, soil-dwelling, species of centipede in the Geophilidae family. G. flavus occurs in a range of habitats across central Europe, North America, Australia, New Zealand and other tropical regions. Geophilomorph centipedes, like centipedes generally, are primary predators, hunting predominantly in underground soil burrows or above ground leaf litter. Their consumption behaviours are influenced by environment and seasonal factors. Given their lack of economic value and marginal medical significance, G.flavus remains largely understudied in mainstream research. Some recent studies have detailed the evolutionary development of G.flavus and Geophilidae generally, illustrating developed predatory features like forcipule venom glands.

== Description ==
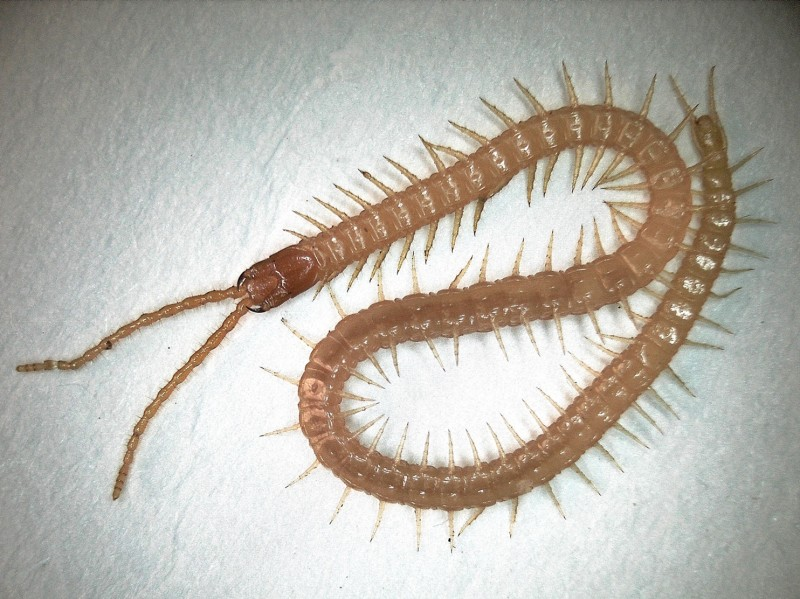
Body of Geophilus flavus

These centipedes are yellow and may grow up to 45 millimetres (1.8 in) in length. They are sightless, and rely on specialised sensory organs to sense movement, humidity and light. Like other myriapods, they have an exoskeleton and a pair of antennae on their head and rear. These antennae are used to locate prey and decode olfactory and tactile stimuli. The males of this species have 47 to 55 pairs of legs; females have 49 to 59 leg pairs. The first pair of legs have small pincer-like claws called forcipules which house poison ducts. These forcipules allow G.flavus to grab and immobilise their prey prior to consumption. Young G.flavus centipedes are able to regenerate lost legs, being an epimorphic species.

== Distribution ==
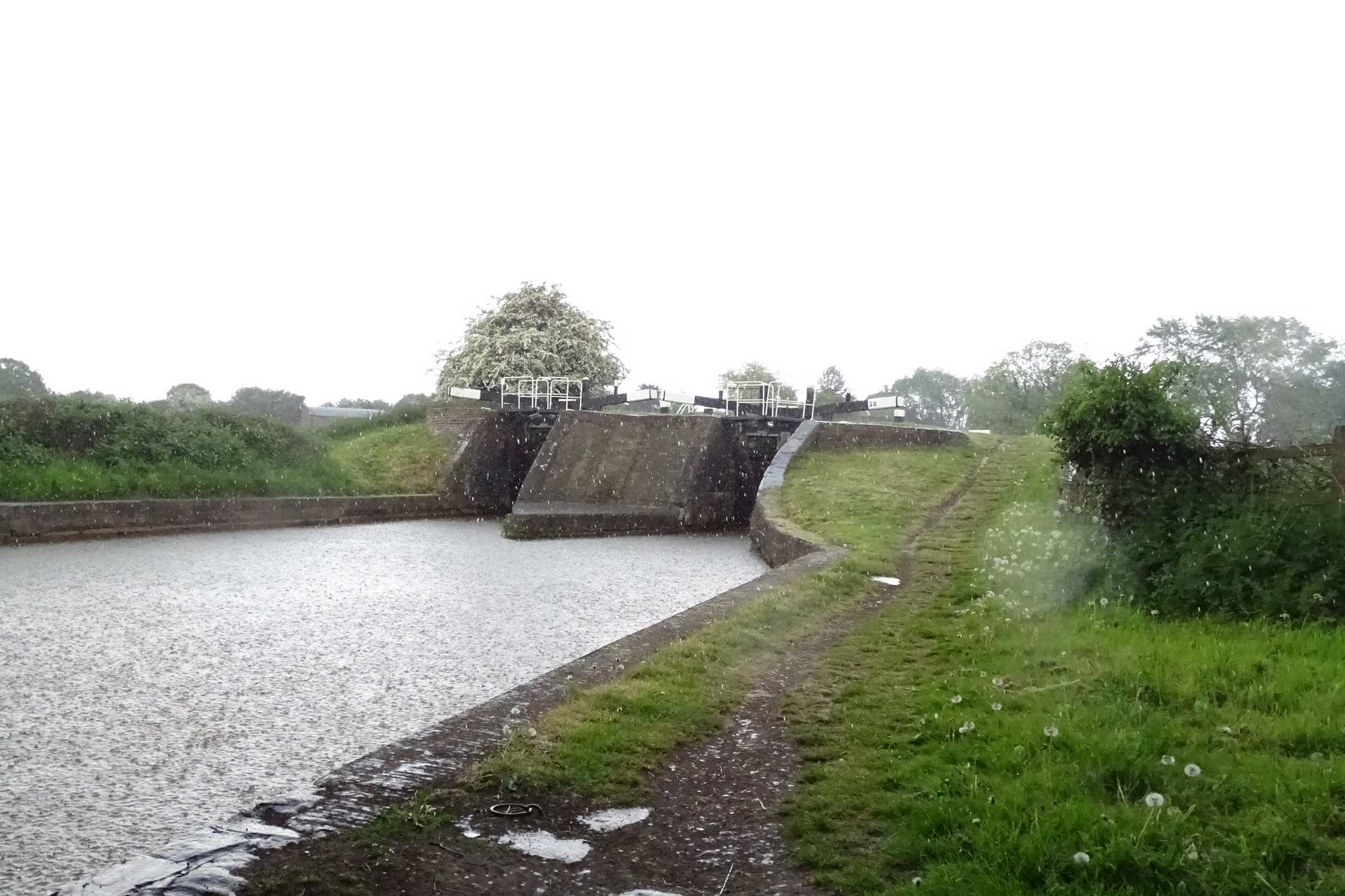
Rainy canal in Cheshire, England. Likely habitat for G.flavus.

The species is widely distributed across regions of Europe, North America and Australia, in suitable local environments such as grassy woodlands and forests. G.flavus can be found throughout most of the Palaearctic region, from North-West Africa through to Siberia. The species is common in the entire Baltic basin, occurring in a range of tropical, costal and temperate habitats. G.flavus are particularly sensitive to relative humidity, as they lose water through their exoskeleton, spiracles and cuticles. As such, the species is most abundant in microsites of high humidity and rainfall.

== Reproduction ==
G.flavus is a sexually reproducing species, much like other arthropods. First, a courting ritual takes place, involving a series of defensive postures and tapping of the legs and antennae on the extremities of the partner. The male G.flavus then produces a web and deposits sperm for the female to collect. The species is generally solitary unless mating or guarding eggs or hatchlings The females lay clutches of 50–60 eggs in soil or rotten wood. They stand guard over the eggs until the young are hatched, protecting their brood by lying in a sternum-upward position. This positions the female's defensive glands away from the young, protecting the vulnerable eggs from poisonous secretions. The Mother takes care of the brood for several weeks or months, until the young are developed enough to hunt on their own. The average life cycle of the centipede is anywhere from 2–6 years, depending on habitat and seasonal demands.

== Diet and predation ==
G.flavus is a major invertebrate predator in forest soil food webs. Unlike other subgroups of centipede, such as Lithobiomorphs, Geophilomorphs actively seek out their prey by searching through leaf litter and mineral soil. G. flavus is an opportunistic predator, preying on a wide range of invertebrates and other readily available food sources. As their diet is diverse and environment-specific, there has been minimal research on specific predator-prey relationships. Generalised trophic cascades, indirect food web maps, indicate that predatory invertebrates such as G.flavus have a significant impact on energy and nutrient transfer.

=== Consumption behaviour ===
The consumption behaviours of G. flavus are regulated by seasonal and circadian rhythms. These rhythms affect the metabolic and physiological processes of the species, particularly during periods of hibernation or food scarcity. Soil communities are greatly impacted by seasonal or temporal changes, and changes in climate result in altered feeding patterns. In periods of increased temperature and soil dryness as a result of season or from ongoing climate change, G. flavus displays higher rates of food consumption. Increased temperatures facilitate higher nutrient and carbon cycling, as well as increased litter decomposition. These decomposition processes increase the production of bacteria and fungi, key dietary components of the secondary consumers that G. flavus preys upon. The centipede's control over trophic cascades and direct feeding interactions is increased by rising temperatures. Conversely, during colder months when prey is less abundant and G. flavus is less active, feeding interactions increase across the entire soil community. During these periods of decreased activity, G. flavus has less top-down predator control over smaller invertebrates. The centipede instead accumulates reserve materials in the fat body for delayed nutrient absorption. G. flavus enters a hibernation state where fat structures change in order to support long-term sustenance.

=== Diet ===
The diet of G.flavus is relatively generalised, and is flexible depending on available food sources. Gut content analysis of the centipede reveals high levels of lumbricid and enchytraeid proteins, nutrient markers of small soil earthworms. G.flavus predominantly preys upon smaller invertebrates such as worms, mites and insect larvae. Occasionally, if food sources are scarce G.flavus feeds on plant material, or other centipedes. The size and type of prey G.flavus consumes vary across different aged and sized centipedes. Larger centipedes have higher mobility, and can move greater distances in the soil environment, thus they have access to a wider range of prey than smaller centipedes.

== Habitat structures ==
The presence of G. flavus in soil environments impacts rates of bio-organic decomposition and determines top-down prey relationships. They play a key role in maintaining ecological stability in small-scale soil communities by managing smaller prey populations.

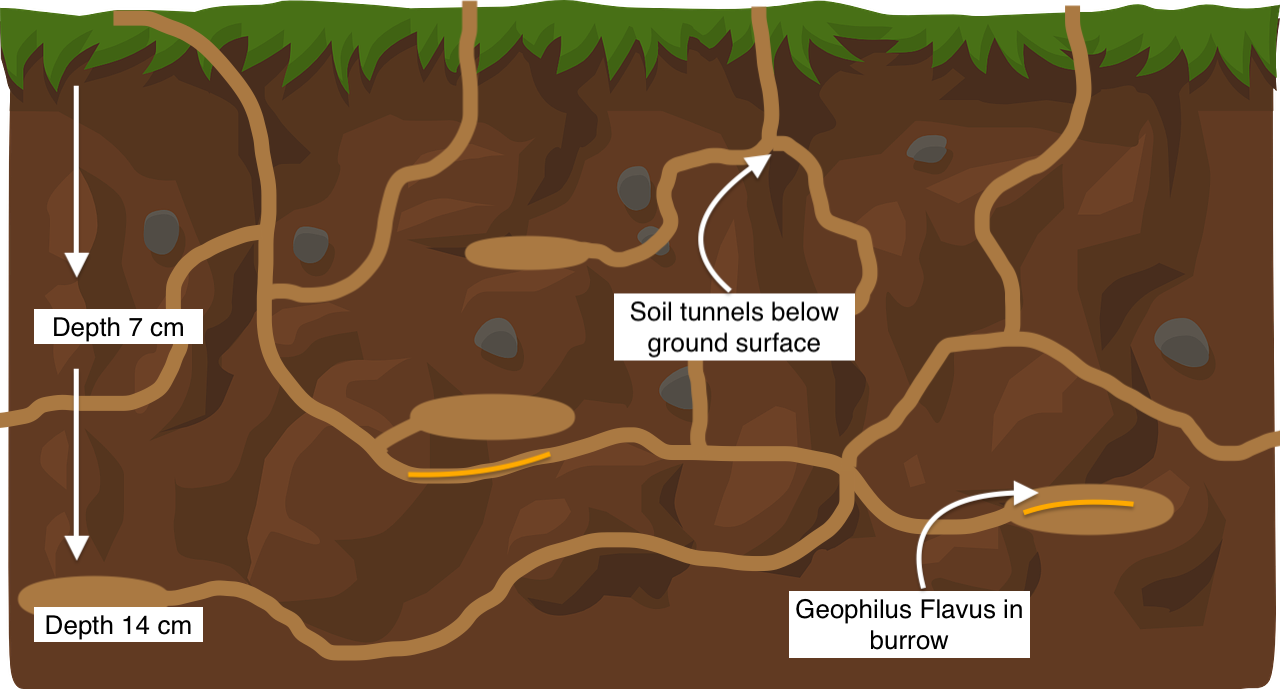
Soil habitat structure of Geophilus flavus

=== Soil community ===
G. flavus inhabits a diverse range of organic structures including soil, rocks, trees, bark and decomposing leaf litter. The species dwells in porous underground soil structures alongside other small invertebrates. This environment provides an ample food source and is relatively buffered against extreme fluctuations in temperature and moisture. The texture and thickness of the leaf litter above the soil surface provides structural niches which facilitate microhabitats and a diversity of small invertebrates that G.flavus hunts. The nature and structure of the habitat is a large determinant of predator-prey relationships, as denser organic layers increase the search time required for centipedes to locate prey.

=== Behaviour in habitat ===
G. flavus generally avoids light and displays a distinct preference for moister habitats. It is a cryptozoic species, and spends most of the daytime under stones and leaf litter, waiting until night time to hunt. Depending on the season, G. flavus will burrow at different depths in the soil. In wetter, more tropical weather, the centipede will burrow closer to the surface of the soil at around 7 cm. In dryer weather, the centipede burrows at a deeper depth between 7–14 cm. G. flavus moves through the soil similarly to earthworms, expanding their length forward, and then contracting in order to pull their body towards their head. This movement creates soil tunnels and burrows, allowing the flow of air and water towards underground plant roots. G. flavus in more temperate regions are generally perennial, living longer with a lower reproductive potential than their tropical counterparts.

== Ecological developments ==
G. flavus has specific ecological adaptations which make it suited to live in a diversity of habitats. The centipede is physically and biologically specialised for navigating soil communities and seasonal changes.

Burrowing

G.flavus elongated body is specially adapted for movement through deep soil layers, narrow galleries and clefts. The long, slender body is flat and compressed, protected by rigid cuticular plates separated by flexible membranes. G.flavus is a burrowing species, moving through soil tunnels like a thread in search of prey or shelter. G.flavus is highly suited to predation, moving through leaf litter, narrow cracks and underground structures with minimal restriction. The species also has developed evolutionary mechanisms which increase its osmotic and respiratory capacity in low burrows where oxygen is scarce. The species has adapted to operate without hemocyanin, an oxygen carrying protein required by other arthropods to live in low oxygen conditions.

Fat body

G.flavus has a specialised fat body, a mass of cells between the epidermis and digestive system which accumulates lipids, glycogen and proteins. The fat body stores excess nutrients and responds to seasonal changes, increasing nutrient retention where necessary. The highly adjustable fat body allows G.flavus to maximise prey abundance when environments are warmer, retaining nutrients for later conversion, usually during hibernation periods. This evolutionary adaptation is specific to arthropods, and ensures greater species longevity across changing seasons and environments.

== Academic research ==
A small number of studies have investigated the unique properties and behaviours of G.flavus, mainly establishing the species' distribution and taxonomy. There is yet to be extensive academic research specifically pertaining to G.flavus and species' specific evolutionary behaviours or developments.

=== 1. Ultrastructure of the fat body in the soil centipedes Lithobius forficatus (Lithobiidae) and Geophilus flavus (Geophilidae) according to their seasonal rhythms (2019) ===
This study investigates the nature of the fat body structure in soil centipedes, looking specifically at G.flavus. The study, conducted in 2019, is the first academic paper to investigate the fine structure of the fat body organ in Chilopoda, finding that unlike insects, this structure is not regionally distinct and the fat body is distributed through the entire body cavity. To prove this, researchers collected centipedes from their habitats and placed them into artificial environments which simulated temperature and humidity conditions of a particular season. After several weeks in a specific condition, the centipedes were dissected and examined under a microscope using protein, lipid and glycogen stains. Researchers showed that the fat body in centipedes was constituted by irregular lobular masses of adipocytes, containing organelles responsible for nutrient synthesis. These adipocytes are exclusively responsible for the accumulation and regulation of reserve material in G.flavus. The quantity and nutrient density of this accumulation is directly impacted by the season. G.flavus kept in a Winter condition, placed into a fridge, showed significantly higher quantities of reserve accumulation than those in Spring conditions. This material is exploited via the adipocytes through digestion and autophagy, allowing the centipede to survive through extended periods of hibernation and inactivity. Prior to this study, the only formally recorded information about the fat body in centipedes was from a study in 1898.

=== 2. Centipedes from urban areas in southwestern Siberia, Russia (Chilopoda). Part 2. Geophilomorpha (2017) ===
This study from 2017 provides an outline of the centipede fauna of Southwestern Siberia, mapping the distribution of the G.flavus species. Based on prior taxonomy studies, the species is supposedly new to the fauna of Western Siberia. The study somewhat refutes this claim, hypothesising that G.flavus may have been introduced through the East of Urals several decades ago based on recent distribution and botanical reports. The study also notes that G.flavus may have been falsely categorised as G.proximous in previous USSR reports, making it unclear whether or not the species is new to Western Siberia.

=== 3. Geophilomorph centipedes of Latvia (Chilopoda, Geophilomorpha) (2005) ===
Another, more general, study from 2005 details the distribution and prevalence of Geophilomorpha, and G.flavus in Latvia. This study involved the collection and inspection of various centipedes across a range of habitats in Latvia. The research provides a framework for species identification, and outlines some of the key morphological features of G.flavus. Of 21 collected specimens, the maximum length was 5 cm. The leg bearing segments were between 49 and 55 in males, and 51–57 in females. G.flavus were predominantly found in grasslands and open fields, as well as urban parks and greenhouses. These descriptions largely aligned with previous documentation by De Geer in 1778, stipulating antennae more than 3 times as long as the head and usually less than 60 leg bearing segments. The research also indicates a common prevalence of G.flavus compared to other Geophilomorpha in the Baltic region, hypothesising this may be due to their large ecological tolerance.
