= Yosioki Takakuwa =

Japanese myriapodologist

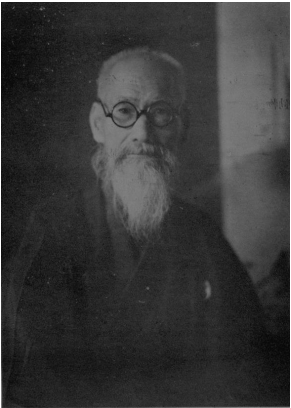
Yosioki Takakuwa

Yosioki Takakuwa (30 November 1873 – 9 March 1960), sometimes spelt Yoshioki Takakuwa, was a pioneer Japanese myriapodologist who carried out taxonomic, anatomical and biogeographical research on the centipedes of East Asia from the 1920s to the 1940s. Most of his extensive specimen collection was destroyed during an air raid on Matsuyama-shi, Ehime Prefecture in July 1945. As well as numerous scientific papers, Takakuwa wrote four books in Japanese about centipede classification: Geophilomorpha (1940), Scolopendromorpha (1940), Lithobiomorpha (1941), and The Anatomy and Taxonomy of Scutigeromorpha (1955).
