= Henry Wilfred Brolemann =

French myriapodologist (1860–1933)

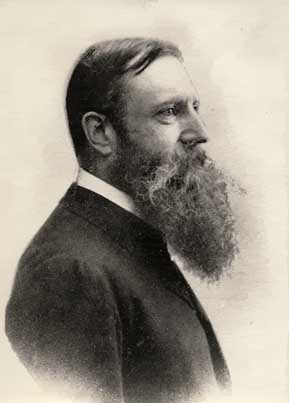
- Born: 10 July 1860; Paris
- Died: 31 July 1933 (aged 73); Forges d'Abel, Basses-Pyrénées
- Education: University of Paris
- Scientific career
- Fields: Myriapodology

Henry Wilfred Brolemann (Note: Orthographic variants include Henri Brölemann; Brolemann dropped the umlaut from his surname from 1920 onward.) (10 July 1860 – 31 July 1933) was a French myriapodologist and former president of the Société entomologique de France known for major works on centipedes and millipedes, of which he named some 500 species. Brolemann was born on 10 July 1860 in Paris, to a wealthy family of Israelite industrialists and bankers that had long since converted to Protestantism. He graduated from the University of Paris and was in the banking business early in life, then left for studies in the United States, including at Indiana University, and then studied in Italy before returning to France and becoming one of the world's experts in myriapods. Brolemann was fluent in English, German and Italian, and wrote in Spanish and Portuguese.
