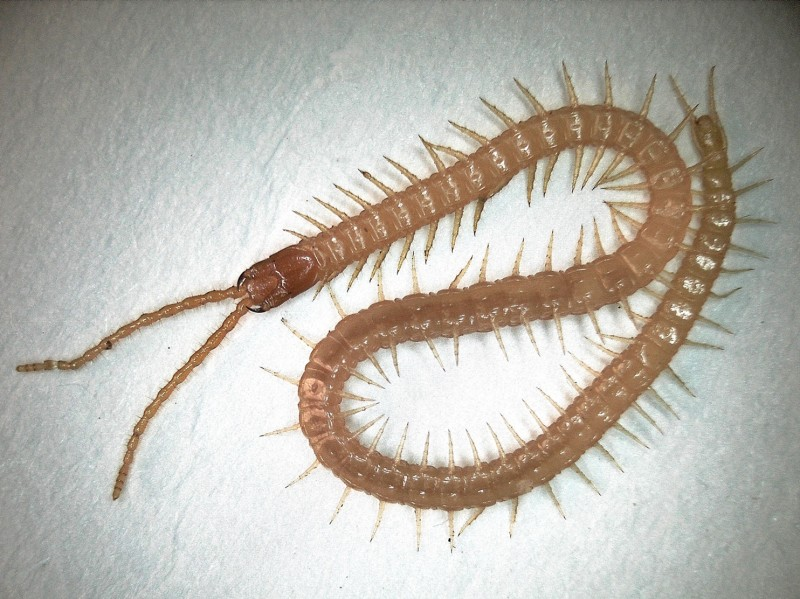
- Geophilus flavus, the Netherlands

Scientific classification
- Kingdom: Animalia
- Phylum: Arthropoda
- Subphylum: Myriapoda
- Class: Chilopoda
- Order: Geophilomorpha
- Suborder: Adesmata
- Superfamily: Geophiloidea
- Family: Geophilidae; Leach, 1815

Synonyms
- Chilenophilidae; Sogonidae

= Geophilidae =

Family of centipedes

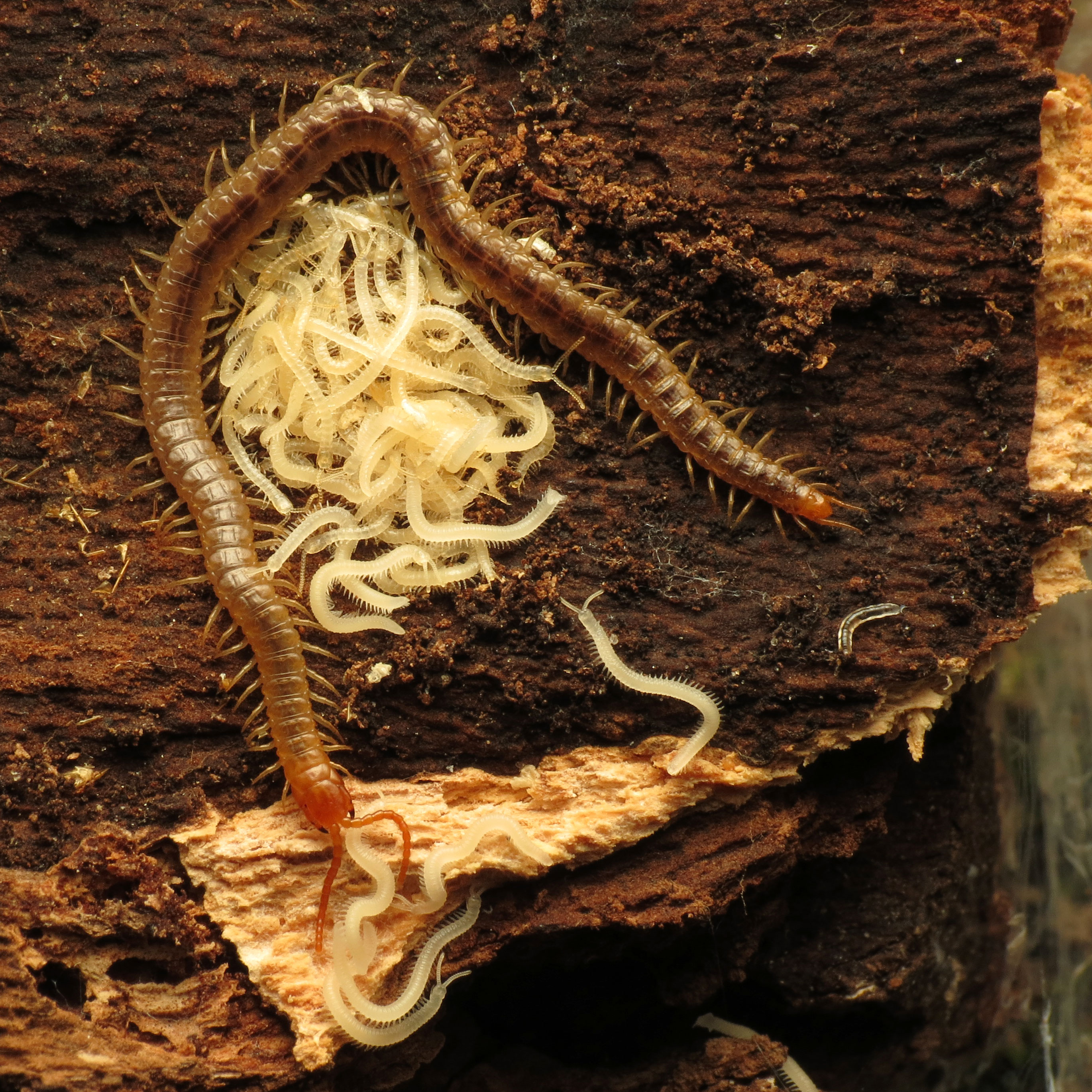
Geophilus sp. mother and brood.

Geophilidae (from Ancient Greek γεω- (geo-), meaning "earth", and φίλος (phílos), meaning "lover") is a family of soil centipedes in the superfamily Geophiloidea and the order Geophilomorpha. In 2014, a phylogenetic analysis based on morphological and molecular data found this family to be polyphyletic. To avoid this polyphyly, authorities dismissed the families Aphilodontidae, Dignathodontidae, Linotaeniidae, and Macronicophilidae, which are now deemed to be junior synonyms for Geophilidae. Authorities also moved some genera from Geophilidae to form the family Zelanophildae in order to avoid the polyphyly of the family Geophilidae. The family Geophilidae now includes more than 650 species in more than 120 genera. This family has a cosmopolitan distribution, with species found almost worldwide.

== Description ==
Species in this family are characterized by mandibles with a single pectinate lamella. Sternal pores are often present but with variable arrangements, and coxal organs are usually present and open into pits or through distinct pores. Female gonopods in this family are usually an undivided lamina.

Compared to most other families in the suborder Adesmata, this family features a modest number of leg-bearing segments and limited variation in this number within each species. Two European species in this family include centipedes with only 29 pairs of legs: Geophilus persephones (29 in the only specimen, a male), and G. richardi (29 or 31 in males and 33 in females). In the order Geophilomorpha, only two species include centipedes with fewer leg pairs, both of them in the family Schendylidae. Several other species in the family Geophilidae are known from specimens with notably few leg pairs in each sex, including Ribautia platensis (as few as 31 in each sex), G. hadesi (33 in each sex), Schendyloides alacer (as few as 33 in each sex), and Strigamia sibirica (as few as 33 in each sex).

== Genera ==
This family contains these genera:

- Abatorus
- Acanthogeophilus
- Achilophilus
- Agathothus
- Agnathodon
- Algerophilus
- Alloschizotaenia
- Aphilodon
- Apogeophilus
- Arctogeophilus
- Arenophilus
- Aztekophilus
- Barrophilus
- Bebekium
- Bithyniphilus
- Brachygeophilus
- Brachygonarea
- Caliphilus
- Cephalodolichus
- Cheiletha
- Chileana
- Chilenophilus
- Chomatophilus
- Clinopodes
- Condylona
- Damothus
- Dekanphilus
- Dignathodon
- Diphyonyx
- Dyodesmophilus
- Dysmesus
- Ecuadoron
- Endogeophilus
- Eremerium
- Eremorus
- Erithophilus
- Eurygeophilus
- Eurytion
- Fagetophilus
- Filipponus
- Galliophilus
- Garrina
- Geomerinus
- Geoperingueyia
- Geophilus
- Gnathoribautia
- Gosipina
- Hapleurytion
- Harmostela
- Harpacticellus
- Henia
- Horonia
- Hovanyx
- Hyphydrophilus
- Ketampa
- Kurdistanius
- Lionyx
- Macronicophilus
- Mairata
- Maoriella
- Mecistauchenus
- Mecophilus
- Mixophilus
- Nabocodes
- Nannocrix
- Navajona
- Nesidiphilus
- Nesomerium
- Nicopus
- Nothogeophilus
- Oligna
- Orinomerium
- Ortognathus
- Pachymerellus
- Pachymerinus
- Pachymerium
- Pagotaenia
- Pandineum
- Peruphilus
- Philacroterium
- Plestophilus
- Plateurytion
- Pleurogeophilus
- Poaphilus
- Polycricus
- Polygonarea
- Porethus
- Portoricellus
- Portoricona
- Proschizotaenia
- Pseudofagetophilus
- Purcellinus
- Pycnona
- Queenslandophilus
- Ribautia
- Schendyloides
- Schizonampa
- Schizonium
- Schizopleres
- Schizotaenia
- Sepedonophilus
- Serrona
- Sogona
- Steneurytion
- Stenotaenia
- Strigamia
- Stylolaemus
- Sundageophilus
- Synerium
- Synthophilus
- Taiyuna
- Taschkentia
- Telocricus
- Timpina
- Tretechthus
- Tuoba
- Tylonyx
- Watophilus
- Zantaenia
- Zygona
- Zygophilus
