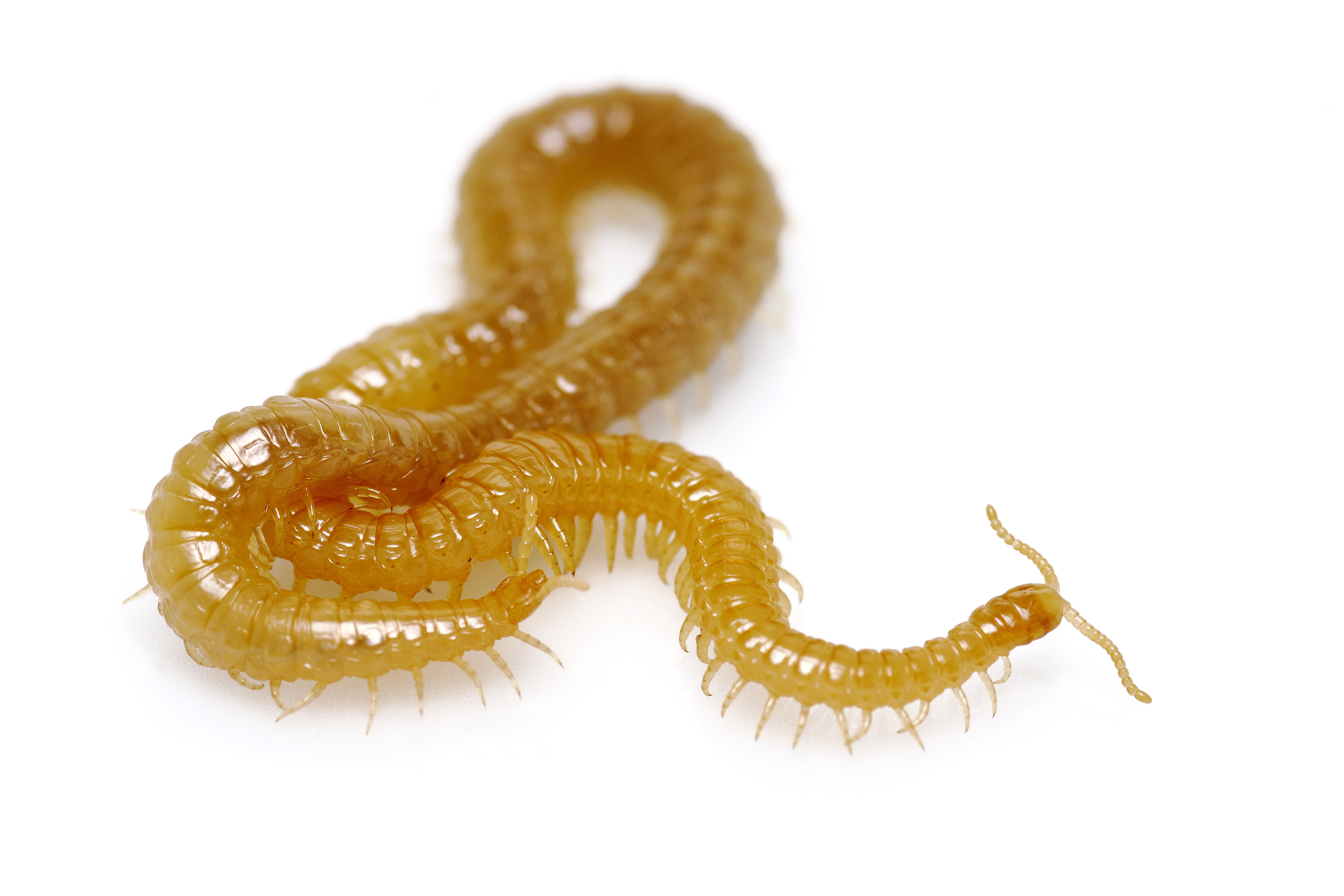
- A western yellow centipede (Haplophilus subterraneanus)

Scientific classification
- Kingdom: Animalia
- Phylum: Arthropoda
- Subphylum: Myriapoda
- Class: Chilopoda
- Clade: Epimorpha
- Order: Geophilomorpha; Pocock, 1896

Suborders
- Placodesmata; Adesmata

= Geophilomorpha =

Order of centipedes

Geophilomorpha is an order of centipedes commonly known as soil centipedes. The name "Geophilomorpha" comes from Ancient Greek γεω- (geo-), meaning "earth", φίλος (phílos), meaning "lover", and μορφή (morphḗ), meaning "form". This group is the most diverse centipede order, with 230 genera. These centipedes are found nearly worldwide but are absent in Antarctica and most Arctic regions.

== Description ==
Centipedes in this order are epimorphic, hatching with a full complement of segments. These centipedes each have an odd number of leg-bearing segments ranging from 27 (in the genus Schendylops) to 191 (in the species Gonibregmatus plurimipes). They are eyeless and blind, with long and narrow bodies, ranging from yellow to brown in color and from about 1 cm to 22 cm in length. They bear spiracles on all leg-bearing segments except the first and the last. The antennae have 14 segments and are usually slightly attenuated.

== Suborders and families ==
This order is a monophyletic group including two suborders: the monophyletic Placodesmata, which contains the family Mecistocephalidae, and Adesmata, which includes the superfamilies Himantarioidea (containing the families Oryidae, Himantariidae, and Schendylidae, including Ballophilidae) and Geophiloidea (containing the families Zelanophilidae, Gonibregmatidae including Eriphantidae and Neogeophilidae, and Geophilidae including Aphilodontidae, Dignathodontidae, Linotaeniidae, Chilenophilinae, and Macronicophilidae). Segment number is usually fixed by species in the family Mecistocephalidae, unlike the case in other families in this order, in which the segment number usually varies within each species.
