= List of Myriapoda species of Ireland =

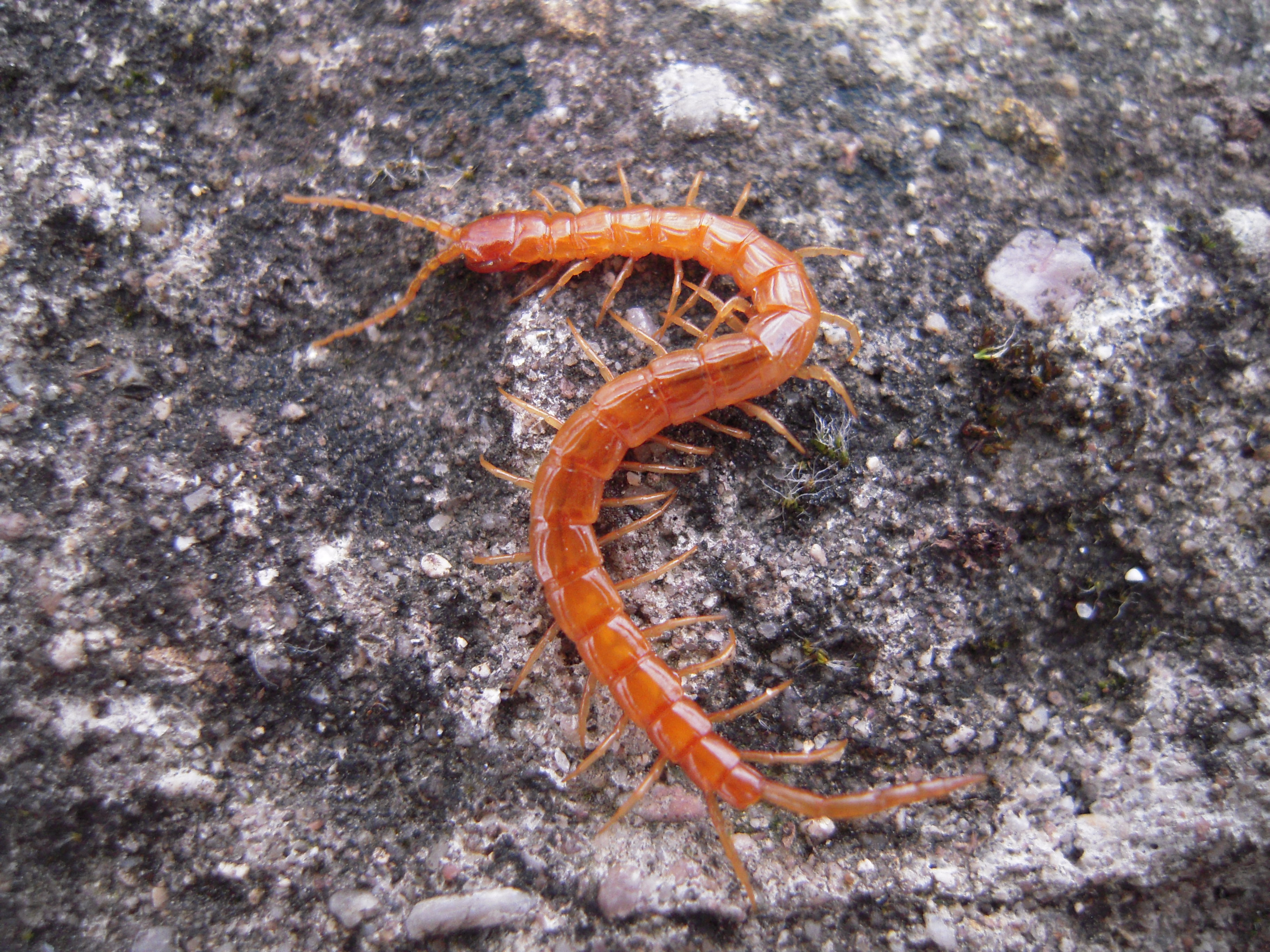
Cryptops hortensis, a centipede common in coastal areas of Ireland.

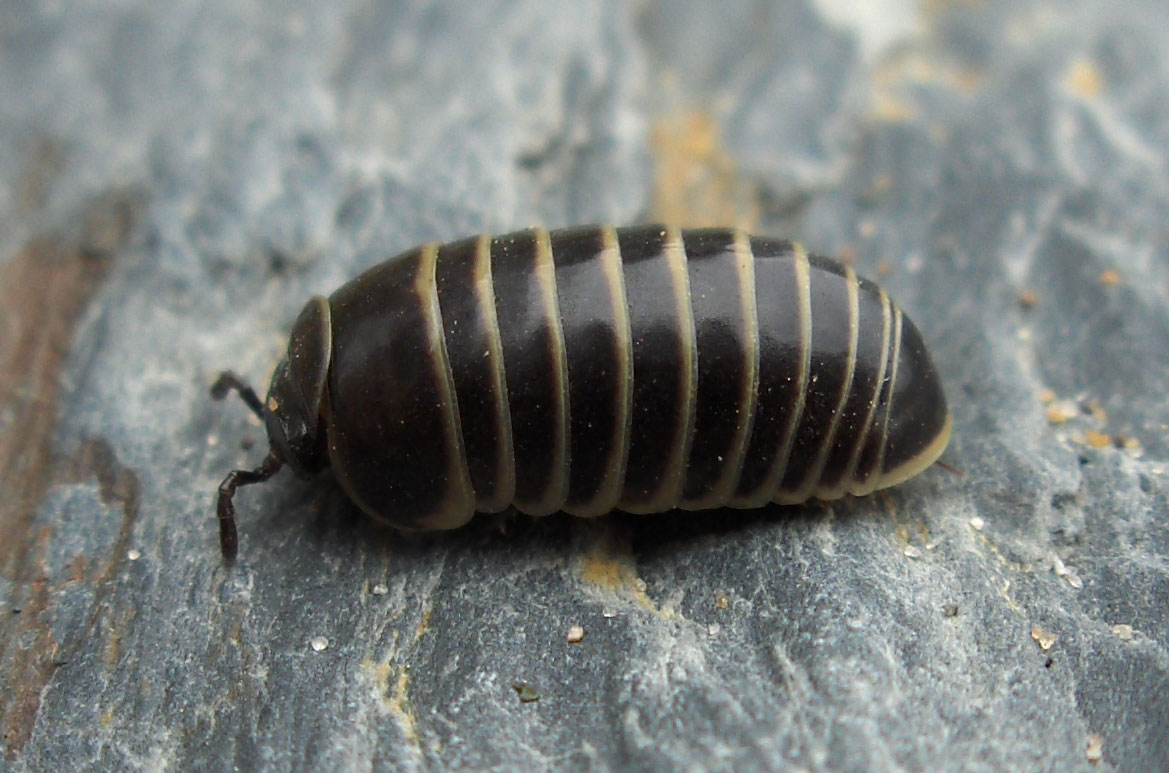
Glomeris marginata, a pill millipede found in all parts of the island.

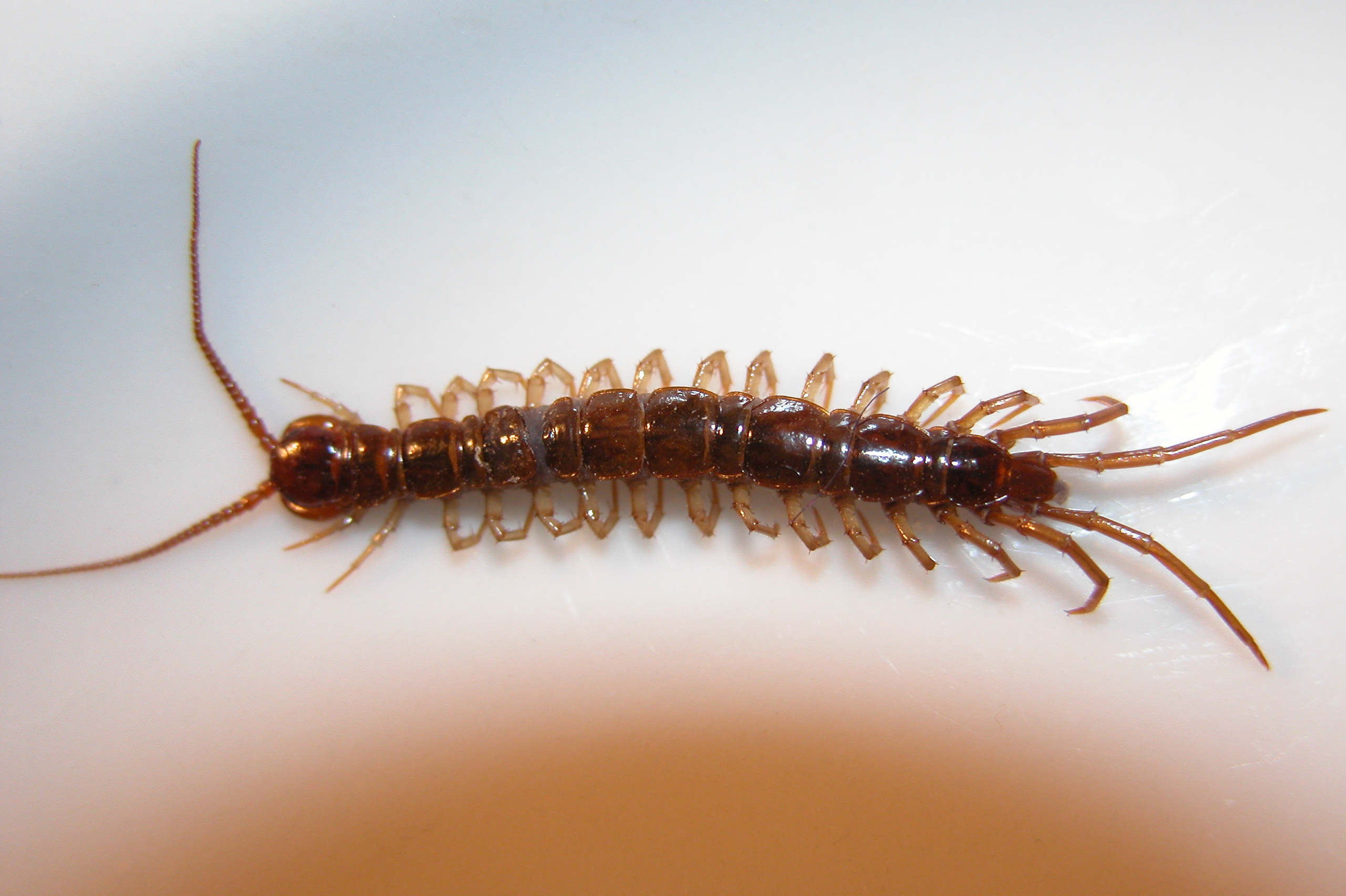
Lithobius forficatus, the brown or stone centipede.

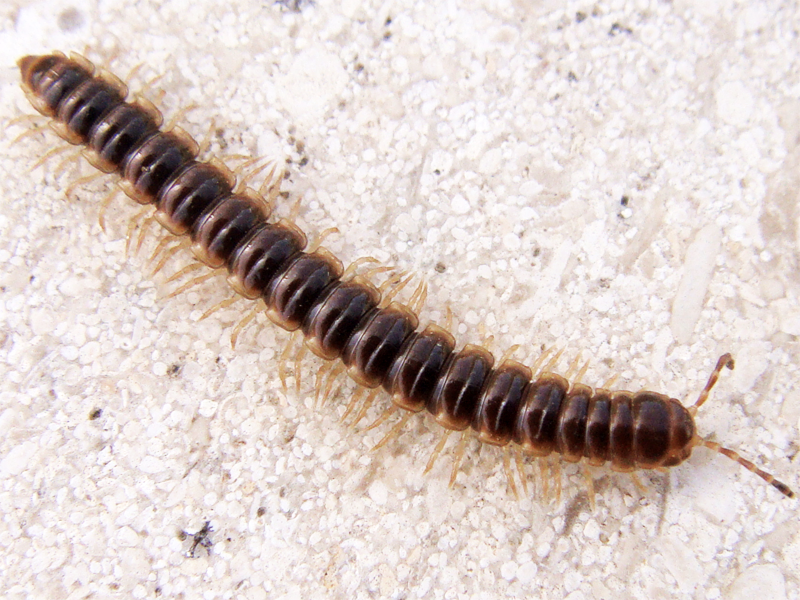
Greenhouse millipede (Oxidus gracilis), a common pest.

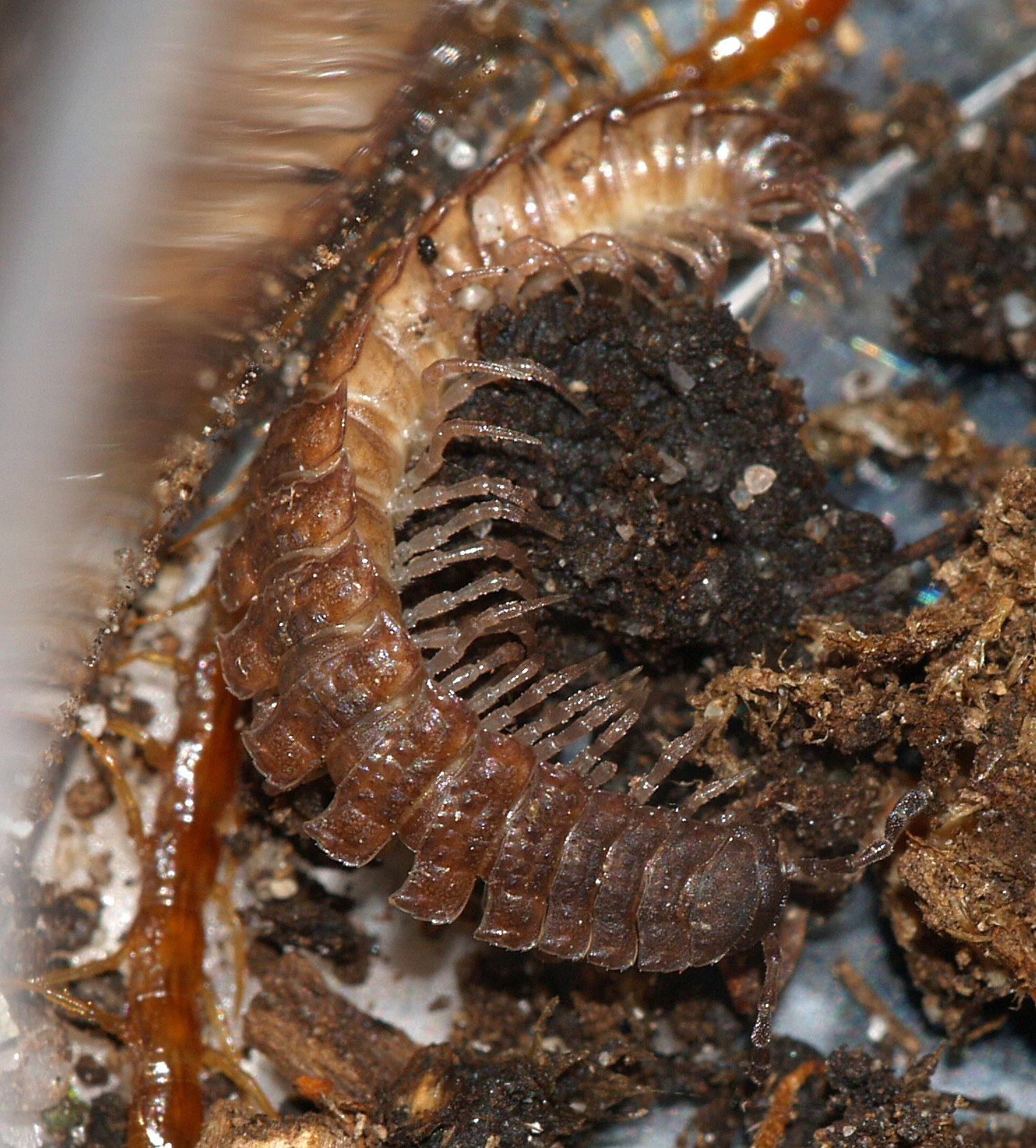
Polydesmus angustus, the flat-backed millipede.

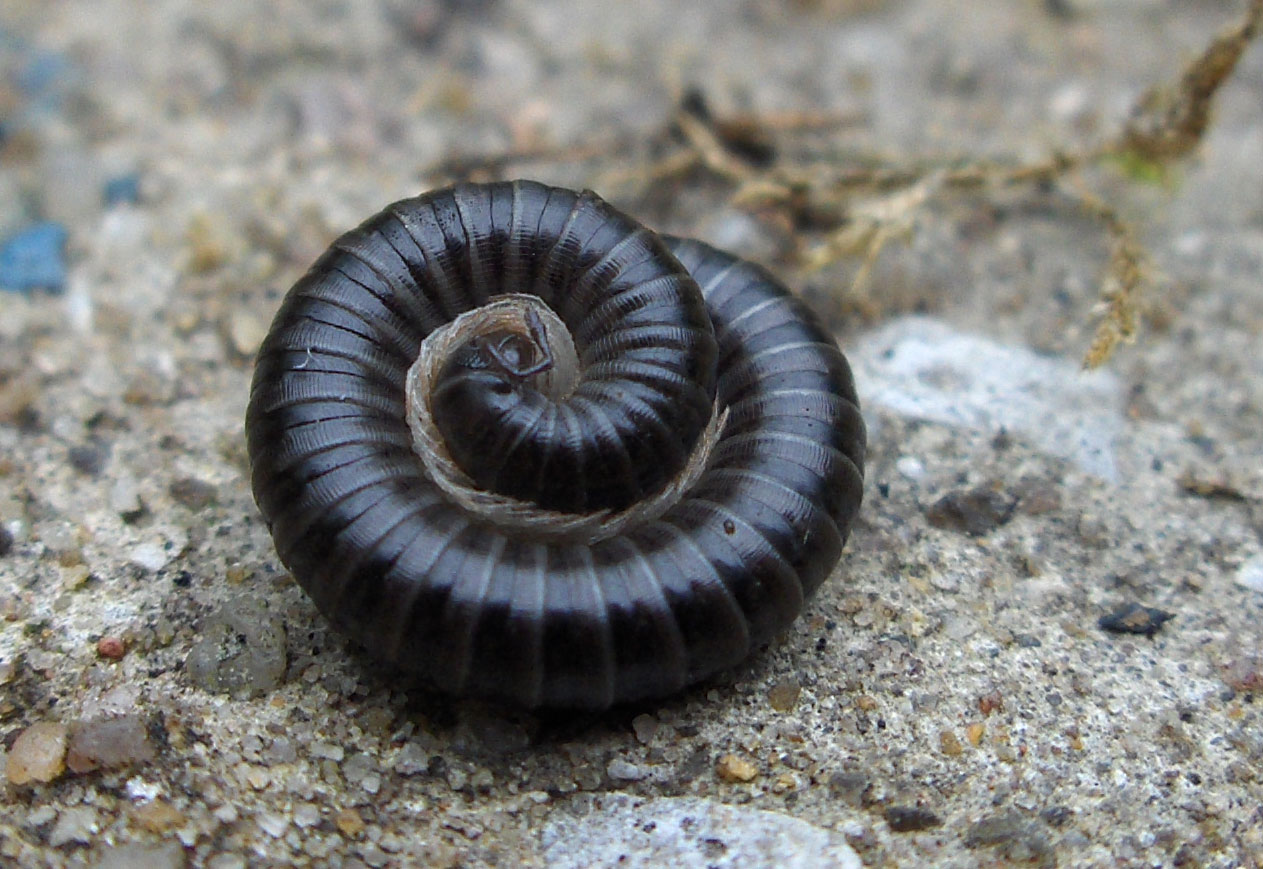
White-legged snake millipede (Tachypodoiulus niger) in defensive posture. Especially common in Northern Ireland.

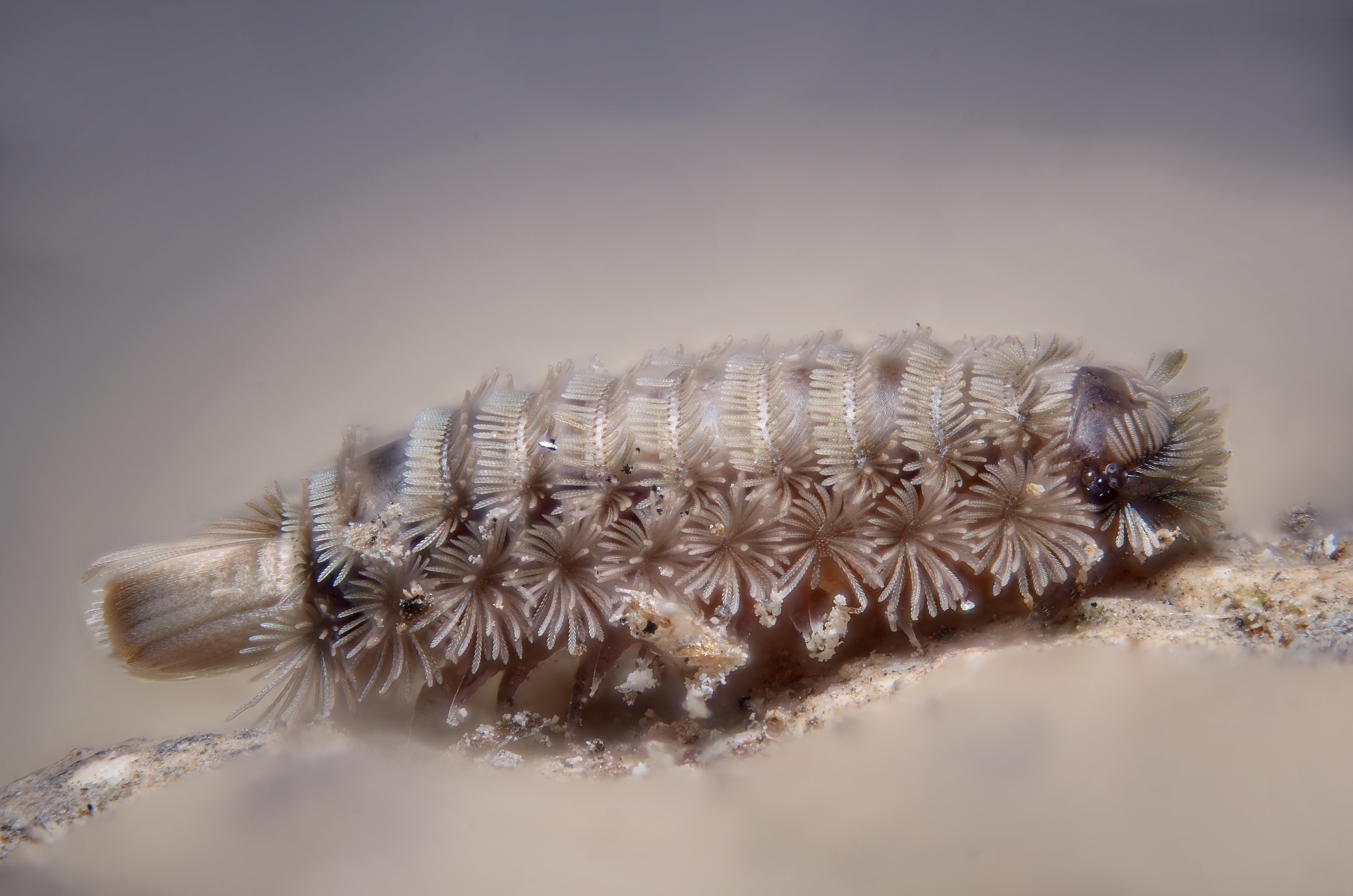
Polyxenus lagurus, the bristly millipede, has been spotted in coastal parts of County Cork.

There are 78 species of Myriapoda native to Ireland.

== Class Chilopoda (centipedes) ==
=== Order Scolopendromorpha (tropical centipedes) ===
==== Family Cryptopidae ====
- Common cryptops (Cryptops hortensis)
- Cryptops parisi

=== Order Geophilomorpha (soil centipedes) ===
==== Family Geophilidae ====
- Geophilus carpophagus
- Geophilus easoni
- Geophilus electricus
- Geophilus flavus
- Geophilus fucorum subsp. serauti
- Geophilus insculptus
- Geophilus osquidatum
- Geophilus truncorum

==== Family Dignathodontidae ====
- Henia brevis

==== Family Schendylidae ====
- Hydroschendyla submarina
- Schendyla carniolensis

==== Family Himantariidae ====
- Stigmatogaster subterraneus

==== Family Linotaeniidae ====
- Shorter red centipede (Strigamia acuminata)
- Strigamia crassipes
- Strigamia maritima

=== Order Lithobiomorpha (stone centipedes) ===
==== Family Henicopidae ====
- Lamyctes emarginatus

==== Family Lithobiidae ====
- Lithobius borealis
- Brown centipede (Lithobius forficatus)
- Lithobius melanops
- Lithobius muticus
- Lithobius pilicornis
- Common banded centipede (Lithobius variegatus)
- Lithobius crassipes
- Stone centipede (Lithobius microps)

== Class Diplopoda (millipedes) ==
=== Order Polyxenida ===
==== Family Polyxenidae ====
- Bristly millipede (Polyxenus lagurus)

=== Order Glomerida ===
==== Family Doderiidae ====
- Adenomeris gibbosa

==== Family Glomeridae ====
- Common European pill millipede (Glomeris marginata)

=== Order Chordeumatida ===
==== Family Anthroleucosomatidae ====
- Irish silk millipede (Anamastigona pulchella)

==== Family Brachychaeteumatidae ====
- Brachychaeteuma bagnalli
- Brachychaeteuma melanops

==== Family Chordeumatidae ====
- Chordeuma proximum
- Melogona gallica
- Melogona scutellaris
- Nanogona polydesmoides

==== Family Craspedosomatidae ====
- Craspedosoma rawlinsii

=== Order Julida ===
==== Family Blaniulidae ====
- Archiboreoiulus pallidus
- Spotted snake millipede (Blaniulus guttulatus)
- Boreoiulus tenuis
- Choneiulus palmatus
- Nopoiulus kochii
- Proteroiulus fuscus

==== Family Julidae ====
- Brachyiulus pusillus
- Cylindroiulus britannicus
- Cylindroiulus caeruleocinctus
- Cylindroiulus latestriatus
- Cylindroiulus londinensis
- Cylindroiulus parisiorum
- Blunt-tailed snake millipede (Cylindroiulus punctatus)
- Cylindroiulus truncorum
- Cylindroiulus vulnerarius
- Julus scandinavius
- Leptoiulus belgicus
- Striped millipede (Ommatoiulus sabulosus)
- Ophyiulus pilosus
- White-legged snake millipede (Tachypodoiulus niger)

==== Family Nemasomatidae ====
- Nemasoma varicorne
- Thalassisobates littoralis

=== Order Polydesmida ===
==== Family Polydesmidae ====
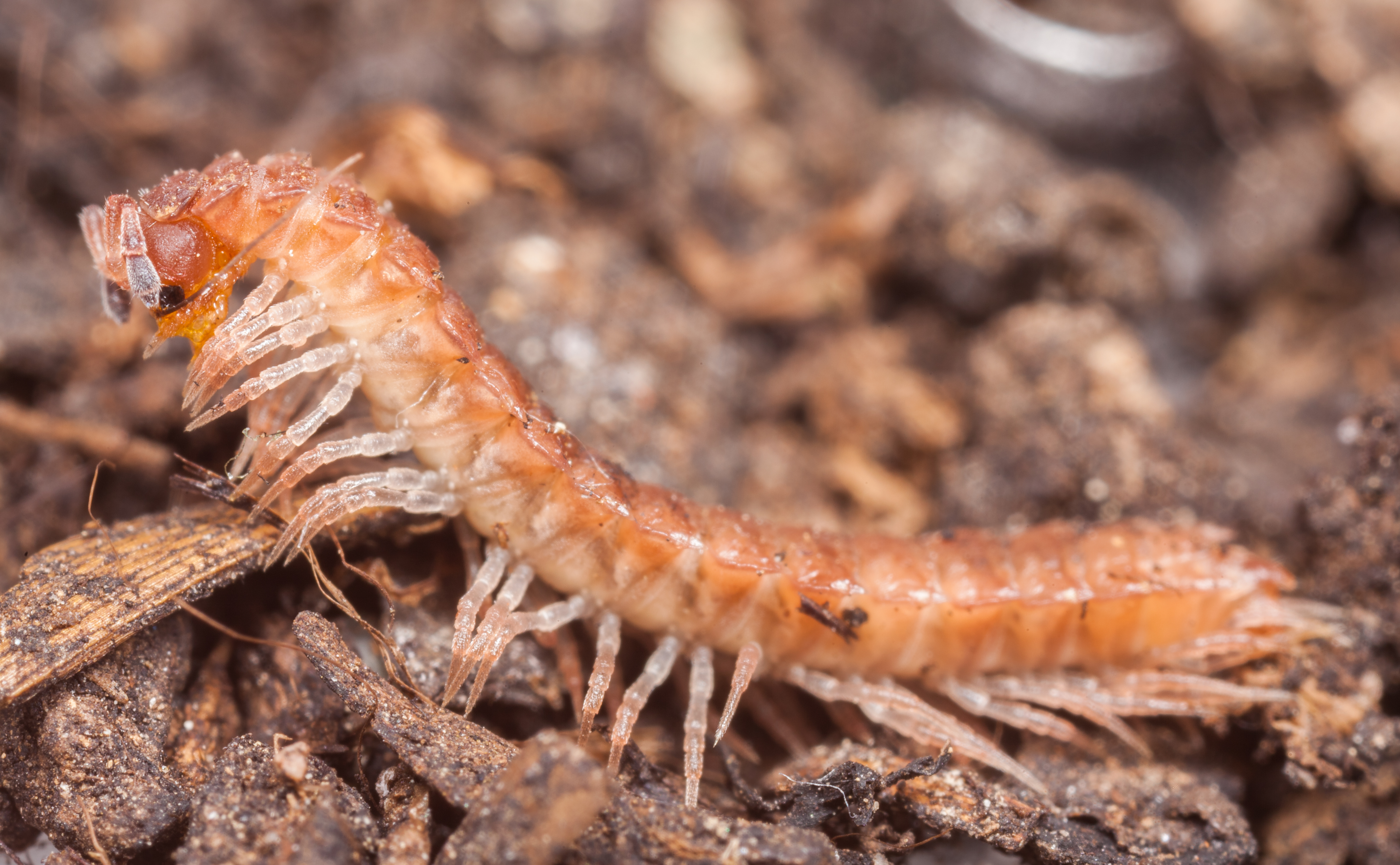
Brachydesmus superus.

- Flat millipede (Brachydesmus superus)
- Flat-backed millipede (Polydesmus angustus)
- Polydesmus coriaceus
- Polydesmus denticulatus
- Polydesmus inconstans

==== Family Macrosternodesmidae ====
- Macrosternodesmus palicola
- Ophiodesmus albonanus

==== Family Paradoxosomatidae ====
- Greenhouse millipede (Oxidus gracilis)
- Stosatea italica
