= Strigamia lutea =

Scientific classification
- Kingdom: Animalia
- Phylum: Arthropoda
- Subphylum: Myriapoda
- Class: Chilopoda
- Order: Geophilomorpha
- Family: Geophilidae
- Subfamily: Linotaeniinae
- Genus: Strigamia
- Species: S. lutea

Binomial name
- Strigamia lutea Matic, 1985

Species of centipede

Strigamia lutea is a species of soil centipede in the subfamily Linotaeniinae, a clade formerly known as the family Linotaeniidae, but now deemed a subfamily within the family Geophilidae. This centipede is found in Romania. This species features a modest number of legs, with 35 pairs in males and 37 pairs in females, and can reach 29 mm in length.

== Discovery and distribution ==
This species was first described in 1985 by the Romanian myriapodologist Zachiu Matic. He based the original description of this species on five syntypes (three males and two females). These specimens were collected in 1983 from a beech forest in Retezat National Park in the western part of the Southern Carpathians in Romania. This centipede is known only from this type locality.

== Description ==
This species ranges from 25 mm to 29 mm in length and features 35 leg pairs in males and 37 leg pairs in females. The dorsal surface of the body is reddish, whereas the ventral surface is pale. The body tapers toward both the anterior and posterior ends. The head is as long as wide and features a frontal groove visible as a light line. The middle piece of the labrum is broad with fine serrations on the posterior margin. The coxosternite of the first maxillae is entire rather than divided, and the coxosternite of the second maxillae is broad.

The forcipular sternite is wider than long and lacks chitin lines. The ultimate article of the forcipules is a short and slender claw that is broader at the base, which features a prominent pointed tooth. The forcipular tergite is wider than the head and features rounded lateral margins.

The sternites feature a transverse series of paired fields of pores. The sclerite in front of the main tergite of the last leg-bearing segment (pretergite) is wider than the main tergite (metatergite). The scerite in front of the main sternite of the last leg-bearing segment (presternite) is divided into two sclerites shaped like ellipses. The main sternite (metasternite) of this segment is elongated. Each of the ultimate legs ends in a claw. The ventral surface of the basal element of these legs features several scattered pores (five in the males, six to nine in the females). These legs are no longer than the penultimate legs and slender in the females but swollen in the males. The telson features two anal pores.

This centipede exhibits many of the traits that characterize the genus Strigamia. For example, this species features a body that tapers toward both the anterior and posterior ends, a head that is about as long as wide, an undivided coxosternite of the first maxillae, a forcipular sternite that is wider than long and lacks distinct chitin lines, a short forcipule with a large basal tooth on the ultimate article, and sternites with paired pore fields. Furthermore, as in other species of this genus, the ultimate legs in this species are about as long as the penultimate legs, feature pores on the ventral surface only, end in claws, and are swollen in the males.

This species shares a more distinctive set of traits with another species in the same genus, S. acuminata, which is widespread in Europe and is also found in Retezat National Park. For example, in each species, the pores on the basal element of the ultimate legs are scattered over much of the ventral surface rather than distinctly concentrated near the adjacent sternite. Furthermore, the pretergite and the contiguous pleurites of the last leg-bearing segment are not distinct but instead form a single pleuropretergite. Moreover, each species features a modest number of legs (no more than 43 pairs) and a narrow metasternite on the last leg-bearing segment, and the setae on the trunk metasternites in each species are shorter than the distance between neighboring setae.

These two similar species can be distinguished, however, based on other traits. For example, the ultimate article of the forcipule is more elongated in S. acuminata, more than three times as long as broad at the base, but shorter in S. lutea, less than three times as long as broad at the base. Furthermore, S. acuminata features more leg pairs, with at least 37 in males and 39 in females, whereas S. lutea features only 35 in males and 37 in females.
