= Geophilus arenarius =

Scientific classification
- Kingdom: Animalia
- Phylum: Arthropoda
- Subphylum: Myriapoda
- Class: Chilopoda
- Order: Geophilomorpha
- Family: Geophilidae
- Genus: Geophilus
- Species: G. arenarius

Binomial name
- Geophilus arenarius Meinert, 1870

Species of soil centipede

Geophilus arenarius is a species of soil centipede in the family Geophilidae. This centipede is found in Algeria. As part of the carpophagus species-complex, this species is closely related to both G. carpophagus and G. easoni.

== Discovery ==
This species was first described by the Danish zoologist Frederik V.A. Meinert in 1870. Meinert based this description on 36 syntypes, including 20 males and 16 females, all found east of Annaba in Algeria. Most of these specimens, including 20 males and 13 females, are deposited in the Natural History Museum of Denmark in Copenhagen.

== Distribution ==
This species is known only from the type locality, near Annaba in Algeria. Records of G. arenarius from various locations in Europe have not been confirmed by modern authors. These records are probably cases of mistaken identity and should be referred to either G. carpophagus or G. electricus.

== Description ==
Males of this species have 55 pairs of legs, whereas females have 55, 57, or 59 leg pairs, with 57 as the most common number. This centipede (when preserved in an ethanol solution) is a pale browninsh gray or greenish gray and nearly uniform in color. The body narrows only slightly toward the head but is more attenuated toward the posterior end. Specimens range from 18 mm to 35 mm in length.

This species shares a distinctive set of features with G. carpophagus and G. easoni that places G. arenarius in the carpophagus species-complex. For example, all three species feature incomplete chitin-lines on the ventral surface of the forcipular segment. Furthermore, these species feature clusters of pores on the ventral surface of their leg-bearing segments from the first through the penultimate segment. These pores appear in transverse bands on the posterior side of these segments, entire in the anterior segments but divided in the middle in the posterior segments. Finally, these species also feature coxal pores on the ventral surface of the ultimate legs along the lateral margin of the sternite.

Other features, however, distinguish G. arenarius from the other species in the carpophagus species-complex. For example, G. arenarius differs from both G. carpophagus and G. easoni by lacking a transverse suture on the head as well as having relatively stouter antennae and forcipular coxosternite. Furthermore, the sternites in both G. carpophagus and G. easoni feature a carpophagus structure, in which a peg projecting from the posterior margin of one sternite is associated with a pit or socket in the anterior margin of the next sternite. This structure is absent in G. arenarius.

Several other features distinguish G. arenarius from G. carpophagus. For example, G. arenarius is distinctly smaller at full growth (3.5 cm long) than G. carpophagus (6.5 cm long). Furthermore, G. arenarius has tubercles lining the intermediate part of the labrum that are usually more stout, blunt, and sclerotised than the corresponding tubercles in G. carpophagus, which are usually more elongate, pointed, and transparent. Finally, G. arenarius features a minute pointed denticle at the base of the ultimate article of the forcipule, whereas G. carpophagus either lacks such denticle or features at most a shallow bulge at this site.

Another set of features distinguish G. arenarius from G. easoni. For example, G. arenarius has only 8 or 9 bristles lining the lateral parts of the labrum, where G. easoni has 15 to 23 bristles. Furthermore, G. easoni has fewer legs (only 45 to 49 pairs in males and 47 to 53 in females) than observed in G. arenarius. Finally, G. arenarius features a more greyish trunk than G. easoni, which has a tan or chestnut trunk.

Although the species G. arenarius is sometimes confused with G. electricus, these two species can be distinguished based on several traits. For example, carpophagus structures are present in G. electricus, but these structures are absent in G. arenarius. Furthermore, G. electricus features complete chitin-lines on the forcipular segment, whereas these chitin-lines in G. arenarius are incomplete. Moreover, G. electricus can have as many as 75 leg pairs and usually has more than the number observed in G. arenarius.
