= Geophilus persephones =

Scientific classification
- Kingdom: Animalia
- Phylum: Arthropoda
- Subphylum: Myriapoda
- Class: Chilopoda
- Order: Geophilomorpha
- Family: Geophilidae
- Genus: Geophilus
- Species: G. persephones

Binomial name
- Geophilus persephones Foddai & Minelli, 1999

Species of centipede

Geophilus persephones is a species of soil centipede in the family Geophilidae. This centipede was discovered in a cave in southern France. This species is named for Persephone, the queen of the underworld in Greek mythology, and was the first troglomorphic centipede in the order Geophilomorpha to be discovered and remains one of only a few known in this order. This centipede features only 29 pairs of legs and is one of only two species in the family Geophilidae (and one of only six species in the order Geophilomorpha) found with so few legs.

== Discovery ==
This species was first described in 1999 by the Italian biologists Donatella Foddai and Alessandro Minelli. They based the original description of this species on a male holotype collected in 1995 by the biospeleologist Gianfranco Caoduro in the Gouffre de la Pierre Saint-Martin cave in the department of Pyrénées-Atlantiques in France. This holotype is deposited in the Muséum National d’Histoire Naturelle in Paris.

== Habitat ==
The holotype was found on a large boulder surrounded by water in the largest open space in the Pierre Saint-Martin cave, a complex of more than 50 km of passages extending from France into Spain. This cave is the eleventh deepest cave in the world, with a low point 1,342 meters below the most elevated entrance. The climate is stable in the hall where the holotype was collected, with low temperatures and high humidity. An underground river with waterfalls flows through the cave, and sudden floods frequently sweep through the floor of the hall.

== Distribution and conservation ==
This species is endemic to the Pierre Saint-Martin cave in France and has not been found again since the collection of the only specimen, despite efforts by several surveys in the cave since 2010. This cave, including the large chamber where the holotype was discovered, has been open to the public since 2010, with more than 10,000 visitors per year. This flow of visitors poses a threat to the survival of this species, which may have already disappeared. Authorities consider this species threatened and vulnerable to extinction at the slightest disturbance.

== Description ==
The species G. persephones is small, known only from a single male specimen measuring 16.2 mm in length, and features only 29 leg pairs. This specimen (preserved in alcohol) is a pale golden yellow. The distal ends of the forcipules and the claws on the walking legs are slightly reddish brown. Like other geophilomorphs, this species is blind, has a flattened trunk, and is well adapted to underground life. This centipede also exhibits troglomorphic features, including elongated antennae (7.2 times as long as the dorsal plate on the head), long legs, and abundant sensory setae.

This species also exhibits other traits that distinguish this centipede from many other species of Geophilus. For example, the telopodites of the second maxillae in the holotype of this species ends in tiny tubercles rather than claws, with one tubercle on the right side and two on the left. Furthermore, the second through the thirteenth sternites in this centipede feature carpophagus structures, in which a peg projecting from the posterior margin of one sternite is associated with a pit or socket in the anterior margin of the next sternite. An especially distinctive feature of this centipede is the labrum, which is underdeveloped and not divided into the usual three distinct parts (two lateral and one in the middle). Instead, the lateral parts are entirely absent in this centipede.

== Phylogeny ==
In 1999, a cladistic analysis based on the morphology of ten European species of Geophilus placed G. persephones in a clade with G. oligopus, which emerges as the closest relative of G. persephones in a phylogenetic tree. This analysis also found that these two close relatives form a sister group for G. insculptus, which has since been deemed to be a junior synonym for G. alpinus, which in turn is deemed to be a junior synonym of G. impressus. These three close relatives, G. persephones, G. oligopus, and G. impressus, together form a species complex. These three species share many traits, including second maxillae that end in tubercles, carpophagus structures on the anterior sternites, and long setae on the head, trunk, and legs.

The species G. persephones can be distinguished from both of these close relatives, however, based on other traits. For example, this species has fewer leg pairs than either G. oligopus (at least 37) or G. impressus (at least 39). Furthermore, each antenna is much longer than the dorsal plate in G. persephones (7,2 times longer) when compared to either G. oligopus (about 3.4 to 4 times longer) or G. impressus (about 3 to 4 times longer). Moreover, the labrum is divided into the usual three parts in G. oligopus and G. impressus but not in G. persephones.

== See also ==
- Geophilus hadesi
- Geophilus impressus
- Geophilus oligopus
