= Geophilus oligopus =

Scientific classification
- Kingdom: Animalia
- Phylum: Arthropoda
- Subphylum: Myriapoda
- Class: Chilopoda
- Order: Geophilomorpha
- Family: Geophilidae
- Genus: Geophilus
- Species: G. oligopus

Binomial name
- Geophilus oligopus (Attems, 1895)

Synonyms
- Orinomus oligopus Attems, 1895; Geophilus pauropus Attems, 1927; Geophilus noricus Verhoeff,1928

Species of centipede

Geophilus oligopus is a species of soil centipede in the family Geophilidae. This centipede is found in several European countries, including Germany, Austria, the Czech Republic, Italy, Croatia, Slovenia, Bosnia and Herzegovenia, and Romania. Although this centipede has been described as having an Alpine-Dinaric distribution, this species has also been found in the Carpathian mountains and may be more widespread than previously thought.

== Discovery and taxonomy ==
This species was first described by the Austrian myriapodologist Carl Attems in 1895 under the name Orinomus oligopus. The original description of this species is based on specimens from Mount Hochschwab in the Obersteiermark region of Austria. The type specimens were two adults and a juvenile, parts of which are deposited in the form of two slides in the Natural History Museum in Vienna. Although Attems created the genus Orinomus in 1895 to contain the newly discovered species, he later deemed Orinomus to be a junior synonym of Geophilus.

In 1927, Attems described Geophilus pauropus as a new species found in the Velebit mountains of Croatia. In 1996, however, the Austrian zoologist Erhard Christian deemed G. pauropus to be a junior synonym of G. oligopus, and authorities now consider these centipedes to be the same species. Similarly, in 1928, the German zoologist Karl W. Verhoeff described Geophilus noricus as a new species found in Austria (on Schmittenhöhe mountain and in St. Gilgen, both in Salzburg state, and in Steinach am Brenner in Tyrol state). In 1988, however, the Italian biologist Alessandro Minelli deemed G. noricus to be a junior synonym of G. oligopus, and authorities now consider these centipedes to be the same species.

== Description ==
This centipede ranges from 8 mm to 18 mm in length and is a pale yellow, but the head and forcipules are darker. The male of this species can have either 37 or 39 pairs of legs, whereas the female can have 37, 39, or 41 leg pairs. This species exhibits a set of traits that distinguish this species from similar species in the same genus. For example, the second maxillae in this species each end in a stout tubercle with one or two apical tips. Furthermore, this species features sternal pores that are limited to the anterior part of the trunk. The sternites in this species also feature carpophagus structures, in which a peg projecting from the posterior margin of one sternite is associated with a pit or socket in the anterior margin of the next sternite.

== Phylogeny ==
In 1999, a cladistic analysis based on the morphology of ten European species of Geophilus placed G. oligopus in a clade with G. persephones , which emerges as the closest relative of G. oligopus in a phylogenetic tree. This analysis found that these two close relatives form a sister group for the species G. insculptus, which has since been deemed to be a junior synonym for G. alpinus, which in turn is deemed to be a junior synonym of G. impressus. These three close relatives, G. persephones, G. oligopus, and G. impressus, together form a species complex. These three species share many traits, including second maxillae that end in tubercles, carpophagus structures on the anterior sternites, and long setae on the head, trunk, and legs.

The species G. oligopus may be distinguished from both of these close relatives, however, based on its pore fields, which are limited to its anterior sternites and absent from the first sternite. In the other two species, these pores appear on all sternites but the last. Moreover, G. persephones has fewer leg pairs (only 29 in the only specimen) than G. oligopus, whereas G. impressus has more (at least 41 in males and 43 in females, up to as many as 63). The species G. impressus also has two articles on the telopodite of the first maxilla where G. oligopus has only one article, and the anterior dorsal sclerite (pretergite) is completely fused with the pleurites on the last leg-bearing segment in G. impressus but not in G. oligopus. Furthermore, the labrum is divided into the usual three distinct parts (two lateral and one in the middle) in G. oligopus but is underdeveloped and lacks distinct lateral parts in G. persephones, and each antenna is much longer than the dorsal plate on the head in G. persephones (7.2 times longer) compared to G. oligopus (about 3.4 to 4 times longer).
