= Geophilus aetnensis =

Scientific classification
- Kingdom: Animalia
- Phylum: Arthropoda
- Subphylum: Myriapoda
- Class: Chilopoda
- Order: Geophilomorpha
- Family: Geophilidae
- Genus: Geophilus
- Species: G. aetnensis

Binomial name
- Geophilus aetnensis Verhoeff, 1928

Synonyms
- G. evisensis Verhoeff, 1943; G. henroti Manfredi, 1953; G. insculptus debilis Brolemann, 1930; G. aetnensis pollinensis Manfredi, 1957

Species of soil centipede

Geophilus aetnensis is a species of soil centipede in the family Geophilidae found in Europe and northern Asia, excluding China. As described by Verhoeff in 1928, it grows up to 28 millimeters and has 53 leg pairs, 4 sensory setae each on the 2nd-4th front sternites, slightly notched maxillae, and very faint sternal pits on the thorax as well as poorly developed sternal grooves.

== Taxonomy ==
G. aetnensis is frequently mistaken with G. impressus and was found to be synonymous with its subspecies G. insculptus debilis. Some consider G. gavoyi to be a synonym of G. aetnensis, but this is not official.
