= Strigamia japonica =

Scientific classification
- Kingdom: Animalia
- Phylum: Arthropoda
- Subphylum: Myriapoda
- Class: Chilopoda
- Order: Geophilomorpha
- Family: Geophilidae
- Subfamily: Linotaeniinae
- Genus: Strigamia
- Species: S. japonica

Binomial name
- Strigamia japonica (Verhoeff, 1935)

Synonyms
- Scolioplanes maritimus japonicus Verhoeff, 1935; Scolioplanes japonicus Verhoeff, 1935· Linotaenia maritimus japonicus (Verhoeff, 1935)

Species of centipede

Strigamia japonica is a species of soil centipede in the subfamily Linotaeniinae, a clade formerly known as the family Linotaeniidae, but now deemed a subfamily within the family Geophilidae.

It has been found in Taiwan, Japan and the Korean Peninsula.
