= Strigamia crassipes =

Scientific classification
- Kingdom: Animalia
- Phylum: Arthropoda
- Subphylum: Myriapoda
- Class: Chilopoda
- Order: Geophilomorpha
- Family: Geophilidae
- Genus: Strigamia
- Species: S. crassipes

Binomial name
- Strigamia crassipes (C. L. Koch, 1835)

Synonyms
- Scolioplanes crassipes (C. L. Koch, 1835); Scolioplanes mediterraneus Verhoeff, 1928

Species of centipede

Strigamia crassipes is a species of soil centipede in the subfamily Linotaeniinae, a clade formerly known as the family Linotaeniidae, but now deemed a subfamily within the family Geophilidae.

== Description ==
Strigamia crassipes is red in colour and has a prominent tooth at the base of the poison claw. This species can reach 56 mm in length. Males of this species have 45 to 57 pairs of legs; females have 45 to 59 pairs. The number of legs distinguishes this species from S. acuminata, which has only 37 to 41 leg pairs in males and 39 to 43 pairs in females. The specific name crassipes is Latin for "thick leg."

This centipede produces a bioluminescent substance in its sternal glands and secretes it through the sternal pore fields; it is yellow or blue in colour.

== Habitat ==
Strigamia crassipes lives in woodland habitats in Ireland, southern England and Wales, and elsewhere in Europe.
