= Julus ceilanicus =

Scientific classification
- Kingdom: Animalia
- Phylum: Arthropoda
- Subphylum: Myriapoda
- Class: Diplopoda
- Order: Julida
- Family: Julidae
- Genus: Julus
- Species: J. ceilanicus

Binomial name
- Julus ceilanicus Brandt, 1841

Synonyms
- Spirostreptus ceilanicus (Brandt, 1841)

Species of millipede

Julus ceilanicus, is a species of round-backed millipede in the family Julidae. It is endemic to Sri Lanka.
