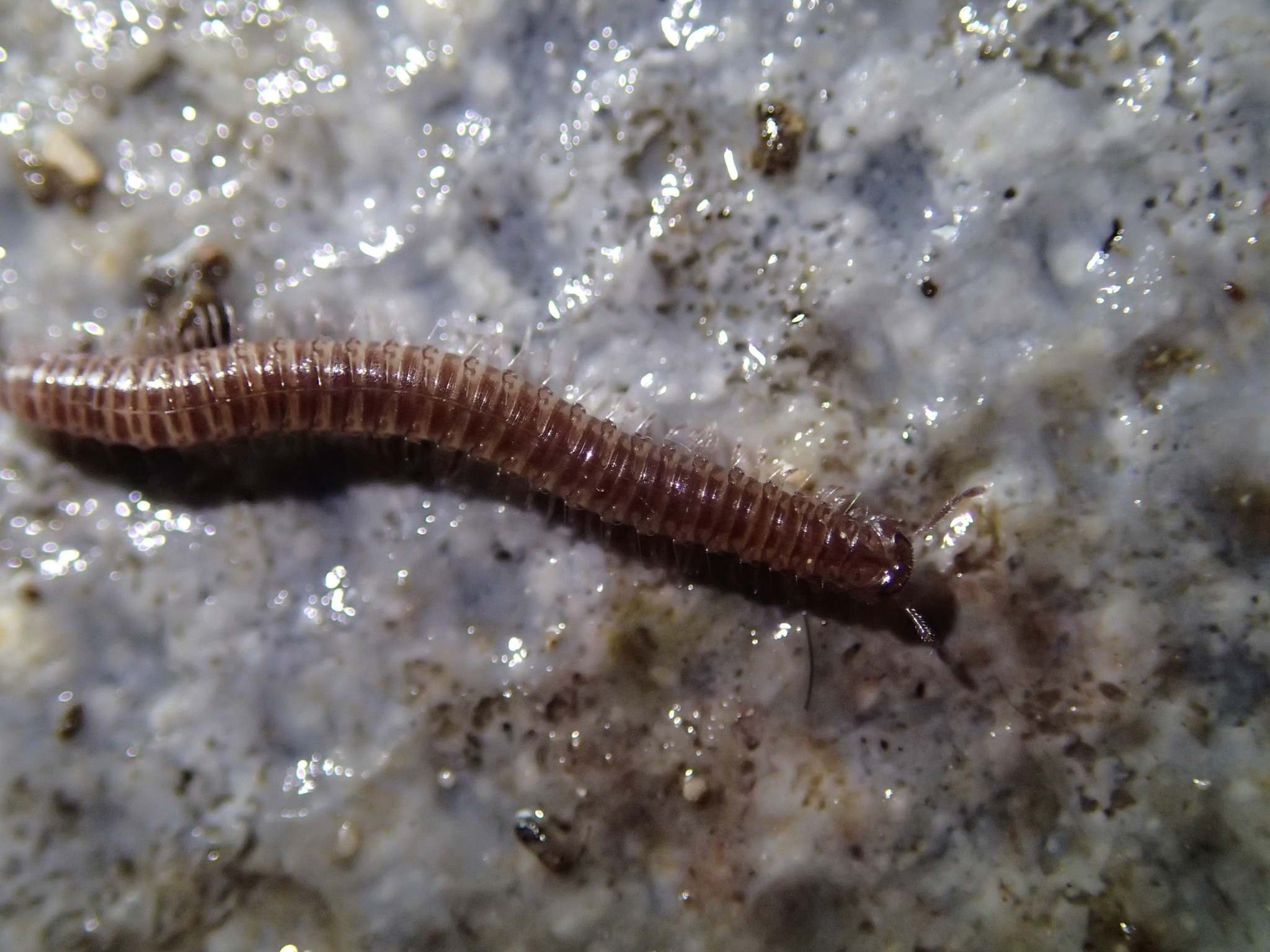
- Anamastigona, Italy

Scientific classification
- Domain: Eukaryota
- Kingdom: Animalia
- Phylum: Arthropoda
- Subphylum: Myriapoda
- Class: Diplopoda
- Order: Chordeumatida
- Family: Anthroleucosomatidae
- Genus: Anamastigona; Silvestri, 1898

Synonyms
- Prodicus

= Anamastigona =

Genus of millipedes

Anamastigona is a genus of millipedes in the family Anthroleucosomatidae. There are about 20 described species in Anamastigona, found mainly in Europe and the Middle East.

== Species ==
These 20 species belong to the genus Anamastigona:

- Anamastigona alba (Strasser, 1960) - Bulgaria
- Anamastigona albanensis Mauriès, Golovatch & Stoev, 1997 - Albania
- Anamastigona aspromontis (Strasser, 1970) - Italy
- Anamastigona bilselii (Verhoeff, 1940) - Bulgaria, European Turkey, Greece
- Anamastigona cypria Vagalinski & Golovatch, 2016 - Cyprus
- Anamastigona delcevi (Strasser, 1973) - Bulgaria
- Anamastigona falcata (Gulicka, 1967) - Bulgaria
- Anamastigona halophila (Verhoeff, 1940) - Turkey
- Anamastigona hauseri (Strasser, 1974) - Greece
- Anamastigona hispidula (Silvestri, 1895) - Italy
- Anamastigona lepenicae (Strasser, 1975) - Bulgaria
- Anamastigona matsakisi Mauriès & Karamaouna, 1984 - Greece
- Anamastigona mediterranea Curcic, Makarov & Lymberakis, 2001 - Crete
- Anamastigona meridionalis Silvestri, 1898 - Sicily
- Anamastigona penicillata (Attems, 1902) - Crete
- Anamastigona pentelicona (Verhoeff, 1925) - Greece
- Anamastigona pulchella (Silvestri, 1894) - Europe
- Anamastigona radmani Makarov et al, 2007 - Croatia
- Anamastigona strasseri Vagalinski & Golovatch, 2016 - Cyprus
- Anamastigona terraesanctae Golovatch & Makarov, 2011 - Israel
