= Geophilus carpophagus =

Scientific classification
- Kingdom: Animalia
- Phylum: Arthropoda
- Subphylum: Myriapoda
- Class: Chilopoda
- Order: Geophilomorpha
- Family: Geophilidae
- Genus: Geophilus
- Species: G. carpophagus

Binomial name
- Geophilus carpophagus Leach, 1815 (Note: Year given as 1814, 1815, or 1816, depending on the source)

Species of soil centipede

Geophilus carpophagus, the fruit-eating geophilus, is a species of soil centipede in the family Geophilidae. It grows up to 60 millimeters in length, with an orange/tan body bearing a distinctive purplish marbled pattern (also seen in Henia vesuviana). Males of this species have 51 to 55 pairs of legs; females have 53 to 57.

== Taxonomy ==
Recent studies indicate that G. carpophagus is actually a group of closely related species (dubbed the carpophagus species-complex). So far only three species have been clearly defined; G. carpophagus Leach, 1815, G. easoni Arthur, et al., 2001 from Europe, and G. arenarius Meinert, 1870 from North Africa.

== Distribution and habitat ==
Geophilus carpophagus is widespread in mainland Europe, north-western Africa, and Macaronesia (Madeira; Azores; Canary Islands; Cape Verde) with a viable population discovered in Finland in 2018. In the north of England, it becomes entirely coastal, where it can be found in cliff sites above the high tide mark. Away from the coast, it is usually found living 1 meter or more above the ground in rocks, walls, buildings, and trees. G. carpophagus seemingly has stronger adhesive abilities than G. easoni, presumably to help with climbing. G. carpophagus nests in drier sites than most other British geophilomorphans, which may be connected to its reduced size and number of coxal pores compared to G. easoni.

== Behavior ==
Geophilus carpophagus has a less aggressive defense response than G. easoni (recoiling instead of rearing and bearing poison claws). In laboratory cultures, mothers that were deliberately disturbed and left their brood would return to coil around it again, a behavior that has never been observed in any other geophilomorph species.
