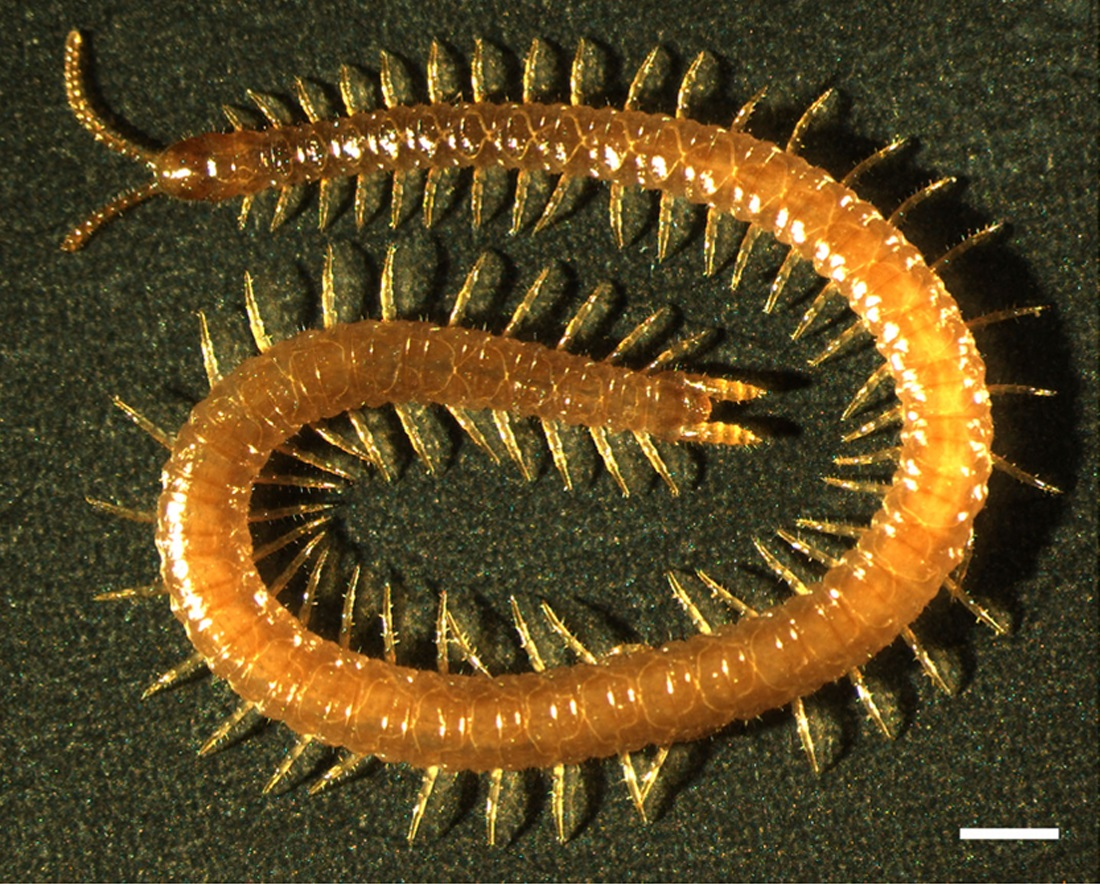

Scientific classification
- Kingdom: Animalia
- Phylum: Arthropoda
- Subphylum: Myriapoda
- Class: Chilopoda
- Order: Geophilomorpha
- Family: Geophilidae
- Genus: Strigamia
- Species: S. maritima

Binomial name
- Strigamia maritima (Leach, 1817)

Synonyms
- Geophilus maritimus Leach, 1817 (basionym); Scolioplanes maritimus (Leach, 1817)

= Strigamia maritima =

Species of centipede

Strigamia maritima is a soil centipede in the subfamily Linotaeniinae, a clade formerly known as the family Linotaeniidae, but now deemed a subfamily within the family Geophilidae. This centipede is the most common of the four fully coastal geophilomorph species known in the British Isles.

== Description ==
In general, Strigamia maritima is the only member of its genus known to occur on the sea shore. The other species of the genus are woodland species. The species are probably concentrated in areas of the shingle bank which are climatically favorable and have a good food supply. They are found only at the top of the shore, around the High-Water Spring drift line on the seaward side of the shingle bank, but this may well be due to the unstable nature of this part of the beach, and the fact that the fauna is usually sparse. The animal is found far lower down on the landward side where it feeds on Sphaeroma and is liable to spasmodic immersion at high spring tides and during bad weather. Immersed animals migrate up the beach suggesting that even the adults are not well adapted to resist fully marine conditions for long.

Mature females migrate into moist sandy areas where conditions approximate to terrestrial ones to lay their eggs, and to brood their young which are rapidly desiccated in unsaturated air. The time of egg laying appears to be geared to correspond with the time when spring tides have their smallest amplitude and with the least stormy part of the year. It is far better defined than in terrestrial species. This gearing is reflected in the size of the oocytes in the ovary, which varies only very slightly between different individuals at a given time of the year. Males also migrate up the beach to deposit their spermatophores, and all stages migrate into the top of the shingle bank to moult. Such migrations suggest that the spermatophores, eggs, larval stages and moulting animals are unable to withstand much immersion in sea water.

It is possible to separate five post-larval instars in both sexes. The last two being mature as they are in lithobiomorphs. Matures females may be aged by counting the number of whorls of sperm in their seminal receptacles. Since the cast receptacular linings remain intact with their openings facing the receptacular duct, sperm passing up this duct are likely to find their way into the old linings and will therefore become arranged in a number of whorls. The centipede is a nonspecific carnivore that feeds at least from February to November. The main food source is Sphaeroma probably because this crustacean is so abundant. The only likely predators of Strigamia are carabid and staphylinid beetles, and these only take the smaller stadia.

== Habitat ==
Studies about the habitat of Strigamia were done in different countries. For example:

- United Kingdom: at the beach at Cuckmere Haven:

The population of Strigamia inhabited a shingle bank on the east side of the mouth of the River Cuckmere which enters the English Channel some two and a half miles east of Seaford, Sussex. Although Strigamia was almost completely absent from the salt marsh proper, a large number of individuals were frequently found at its edge in a narrow belt a few feet wide. The fauna is largely terrestrial in character, the most typical animals being woodlice, ants, and the earwig Porjcub auricularia. L. Strigamia was normally absent from this region. the centipede had deserted this habitat and was not found there in such numbers during the rest of the investigation. The reason for this migration is unknown.

- North Europe:

The centipedes were recorded at an average density of 4.26±0.96 m -1 with a maximum of 49 m -1. The extremely high densities of Strigamia maritima seen on North European shores, specially in Scotland, are very striking (Figure 1). Strigamia maritima was also recorded from the coasts of Scandinavia, Germany, Netherlands, Belgium, Britain, Ireland and northern France. Bergesen et al. (2006) recorded it for the first time for North Norway (under stones in the supralittoral amongst isopods, Porcellio scaber). Whilst Horneland and Meidell (1986) were able to collect "several thousands of specimens" from an island north of Bergen. It is often extremely abundant in favorable situations with large numbers under individual stones, a situation that seems to be paralleled by Geophilus becki according to Habermann (1982). Habitats for S. maritima include shingle, under rocks and stones and in rock crevices. The life history and ecology of this species was studied by Lewis (1961) who related its behavior and its tolerance of seawater at different stages of its life history to it being a mobile species, concentrating in areas that are climatically favorable, have a good food supply and to its breeding season also its ability to migrate up and down beaches. )

== Reproduction ==
The anatomy of the male reproductive system was described by Fabre (1855): A pair of fusiform testis open by way of four vasa efferentia, one leaving from each end of each testis; they fuse to form a much-coiled vas deferens, in which the sperm are stored. The vas deferens divides two thirds of the way along its length to pass round the gut, and fuses again before opening ventrally on a sub-terminal penis. Two pairs of tubular accessory glands lie alongside the gut and open posteriorly into the genital atrium. In maturus males there is a gradual buildup of sperm in the vas deferens beginning in August, when small groups of sperm appear at intervals along its length. The sperm are about 2 mm. long and gradually become rolled up in the distal region of the vas deferens, and lower down are coiled on themselves in the manner of a clock spring. By January the vas deferens is much distended with sperm, and remains thus until May when the number of sperm diminishes. By mid-June the vas deferens is again empty.

The anatomy of the female reproductive system: S. maritima resembles closely that described for other genera by Fabre (1855) and Schaufler (1889), consisting of an unpaired tubular ovary leading to a short oviduct which divides to pass round the gut, fusing again to open ventrally into the subterminal genital atrium. There is a short pair of accessory glands, and in the prepenultimate pediferous segment there is a pair of spherical receptacula semines the convoluted ducts of which open into the genital atrium along with the accessory glands.

After Lewis's analysis in 1968, about the widths of oocytes in the adolescent female S. maritima, it seems that the matures females are fertilized in May before laying their eggs, but the newly recruited maturus juniors are fertilized soon after the moult that produces them in August. In August, the males contain only small quantities of sperm. This may not mean that the rate of sperm production is low, because the quantity of sperm in the reproductive tract depend on the rate of removal as well as the rate of production. The accumulation of sperm in the vas during the winter may be due to a slowing down or complete cessation of spermatophores production at that time. Lewis suggested that the mature males produce spermatophores both in autumn and in spring. And Palmen & Rantala (1954) showed that female Pachymerium collected in the autumn can raise broods successfully the next spring and concluded that in these cases fertilization occurred before hibernation by indiqueting that in the majority of specimen fertilization seems to occur after hibernation.

=== Egg and larval stages ===
The females of S. maritima lay their eggs at the end of May or the beginning of June in small brood cavities hollowed out of the sand in the brooding habitat. The eggs are spherical and measure from 0.9 to 1–25 mm. in diameter. It is, however, easily ruptured. The eggs hatch towards the end of June, and the larval stages closely resemble those described by Verhoeff (1902–25) in MecistocephaZus carniolensis C. L. Koch.

Hatching is a very gradual process in Strigamia. the egg shell splits equatorially, and as the embryo, which is bent into a horseshoe shape, gradually elongates and uncurls during development. It pushes the two halves of the shell apart. In S. maritima hatching begins at what Verhoeff terms the last embryonic stage, in which the limbs and mouthparts are represented by simple buds, and the body, covered with cuticle, is inflated anteriorly since it still contains a large quantity of yolk. Eggs which are about to hatch appear pinkish owing to the pinky-violet color of the contained embryos. The pigment occurs in the gut cells of the larvae, the rest of the body being whitish and translucent. The last embryonic stage moults to the "peripatoid" stage in which the trunk is of uniform diameter, and the limbs better developed.

In the peripatoid stage, the embryo is immobile, but in the "foetus" stage, it is capable of making writhing movements; it has fully jointed limbs and antennae, and clearly recognizable mouthparts. This stage is dorso-ventrally flattened and averages 7 mm. in length. The first adolescence stage is the last to be brooded by the female and closely resembles the adult in form.

=== The embryoid phase ===
The embryoid phase of post-embryonic development of geophilomorph centipedes may represent an extension of embryonic development, possibly in correlation with the evolution of epimorphic development from an anamorphic ancestor, accomplished without completely losing post-embryonic segmentation activity. This continuity in the segmentation process across the embryonic/postembryonic divide may concur to the evolvability of this developmental process.

=== Postembryonic development ===
- Embryo:

The eggs are spherical, measuring 0.88 to 1.11 mm in diameter. The color is changing from yellow to whitish yellow as the embryo develops.

- Embryo to peripatoid

As the egg teeth, helped by the increase of yolk in the front part, break the egg-shell the last embryonic stadium appears. This ends up in the peripatoid stadium. At the end of the peripatoid stadium, both the pre- and the metatergites are formed and the embryonic cuticle is only attached at the rear end.

- Foetus stadium

The body has got its 'normal' dorso-ventral flattening. The extremities are segmented and the male gonopods are not developed. The width of the forcipular coxosternite is measured to 0.34 to 0.41 mm. The number of setae is extremely low as compared to the coming stadia.

- Adolescens:

In this stadium, most characters of the mature animal are apparent, but the numbers of seta, sensory sensilla and coxal glands are increasing through the stadia to follow. It is possible to separate the sexes using a microscope (see male gonopods). Evolving of intentional movement, which eventually leads to the seashore (feeding grounds), is described by Lewis (1961). The major importance is the development of the tracheal system, which also marks the border between foetus and Adolescens 1. It must be the survival factor for animals sporadically submerged in (salt) water, either surviving the submerging or being washed ashore by the same principle.

== Feeding ==
Other gastropods (Littorina saxatalis) and lumbricid worms were all observed at various times to be fed on by Strigamia maritima. Strigamia maritima attacks small Orchestia (or Drosophila if offered) by tearing the prey to pieces. When attacking larger Orchestia, 1 cm or more in length (which it only did if they were damaged or dying) it made a transverse slit and pushed its head and anterior segments inside and the poison claws were seen to be constantly in motion macerating tissue whilst the centipede was involved in what seemed to be external digestion and suctorial feeding. Group feeding, as observed in this species could be advantageous in dealing with prey that would otherwise be invulnerable to them. Alternatively, small specimens could enter barnacles otherwise inaccessible to larger animals and bring about their opening.

== Evolution and development ==
Any individual species of geophilomorph centipede exhibits a much more restricted range of variation in segment number than the range for the group as a whole; just how restricted depends on the species concerned. Some species have a surprisingly large range, for example about 80. Others, in the family Mecistocephalidae, have a range of zero. There is no variation. This family is probably the outgroup to the rest of the Geophilomorpha. Species of Strigamia are intermediate between these two extremes, in that they show a small-to-moderate range of variation. In S. maritima, this range is at least 8 (from 45 to 53). The intraspecific variation has several elements, as described in earlier papers. First, there is sexual dimorphism, with females typically having two segments more than males. Second, there is variation within each sex within a population. Third, there is between-population variation, much of it explicable by a latitudinal cline, in which segment number increases from North to South. The variation cannot be explained by differences in population age structure, because segment number is fixed before hatching. There is no addition of segments during postembryonic growth, despite some assertions to the contrary.

In the naturally occurring variation in the segment number of Strigamia maritima, it is clear that the developmental process, as described above, is being influenced either by genetic or environmental factors, or possibly by both. The difference in segment number distributions between males and females within populations is presumably of genetic origin. But what of the variation within each sex? the importance of genetic and environmental influences on development are now known to be incorrect. early studies have not provided any reliable clues about the causes of the variation in segment number within and between populations in nature but studies had proved that in Strigamia, the variation is at least partially heritable. There may yet turn out to be direct environmental effects too like temperature. This environmental factor can have an effect on the number of segments formed during the period of embryogenesis of Strigamia, because the cohorts within the same population that derive from embryonic development in warmer summers have significantly higher segment number distributions than cohorts that develop in cooler summers. Considering in particular the latitudinal cline, this could be a result of selection, with fewer segments being favored in more northern populations, for example because of a slightly but significantly shorter development time (hypothesis, not fact), which might be beneficial in harsher northern climates with shorter summer seasons. On the other hand, if temperature does indeed have a direct effect on segmentation (again, hypothesis rather than fact), then the cline could be caused by this instead. However, if the explanation was solely of this latter kind, i.e. all due to direct environmental effects and no selective component, then it is hard to explain why the observed pattern of between-species variation mirrors its intraspecific equivalent, with more northerly species having fewer segments than their southern counterparts. One compound hypothesis is that speciating peripheral isolates at northern or southern ends of a parent species' range go through a phase of having a restricted amount of variation in segment number. These may experience canalization of their developmental system so that it is resistant to producing segment numbers outside that range until the newly speciated isolate begins to extend its own range north or south from its starting point, thus again experiencing a wider range of temperatures. Thus, each species would carry a genetic 'imprint' of its site of origin.
