= Julus curvicornis =

Scientific classification
- Kingdom: Animalia
- Phylum: Arthropoda
- Subphylum: Myriapoda
- Class: Diplopoda
- Order: Julida
- Family: Julidae
- Genus: Julus
- Species: J. curvicornis

Binomial name
- Julus curvicornis Verhoeff, 1899

Species of millipede

Julus curvicornis is a species of millipede from the Julidae family. It was described by Karl Wilhelm Verhoeff in 1899 and is endemic to Slovakia.
