= Geophilus gavoyi =

Scientific classification
- Kingdom: Animalia
- Phylum: Arthropoda
- Subphylum: Myriapoda
- Class: Chilopoda
- Order: Geophilomorpha
- Family: Geophilidae
- Genus: Geophilus
- Species: G. gavoyi

Binomial name
- Geophilus gavoyi Chalande, 1910

Species of soil centipede

Geophilus gavoyi is a species of soil centipede in the family Geophilidae. It is closely related to both Geophilus aetnensis and its junior synonym G. evisensis; it's considered by some to be a synonym of G. evisensis. It's found under stones in northern Asia and western Europe, especially France and England. It grows to between 23 and 35 millimeters in length and has between 39 and 43 leg pairs in males and 41–45 in females. In the since debunked elongata subspecies it was said to vary from between 49 and 55 leg pairs in males and between 51 and 57 in females. As described in 1964, it has well-developed sternal grooves, longer legs than G. aetnensis, and normal claws in the anal legs.
