= Metamastigophorophyllon =

Scientific classification
- Kingdom: Animalia
- Phylum: Arthropoda
- Subphylum: Myriapoda
- Class: Diplopoda
- Order: Chordeumatida
- Family: Anthroleucosomatidae
- Genus: Metamastigophorophyllon; Ceuca, 1976

Type species
- Mastigophorophyllon giljarovi Lang, 1959

Synonyms
- Persedicus Mauriès, 1982

Genus of millipede

Metamastigophorophyllon is a genus of millipedes in the family Anthroleucosomatidae. This genus includes millipedes found in Azerbaijan, Iran, Russia, and Georgia. All five species in this genus have 31 segments in adults (counting the collum as the first segment and the telson as the last). This genus is notable for including the only species in the order Chordeumatida with 31 segments rather than the 30 segments usually observed in adults in this order.

== Discovery and taxonomy ==
The Romanian zoologist Traian Ceuca first proposed Metamastigophorophyllon in 1976 as a subgenus within the genus Mastigophorophyllon in the family Mastigophorophyllidae. Ceuca proposed this monotypic subgenus to contain the species Mastigophorophyllon giljarovi, which was described by the Czech zoologist Jaroslav Lang in 1959 based on type material found near Krasnaya Polyana in Russia. Lang described this species as having 30 segments.

In 1982, the French myriapodologist Jean-Paul Mauriès of the Muséum National d'Histoire Naturelle in Paris described the monotypic genus Persedicus and its type species Persedicus martensi based on specimens found in wet litter in dense forests in Mazandaran province in Iran. Mauriès placed this genus in the family Anthroleucosomatidae and described this genus and its type species as having 31 segments in adults of both sexes. This species was the first in the order Chordeumatida to be described with an odd number of segments in adults: Before the description of this species, adults in this order were known to have only 26, 28, 30, or 32 segments. This millipede remained the only chordeumatidan species described with 31 segments for more than three decades.

In 2016, the Serbian myriapodologists Dargan Ž. Antić and Slobodan E. Makarov of the University of Belgrade described three new species in the genus Metamastigophorophyllon, all with 31 segments in adults, and all found in the Caucasus: M. hamatum, M. lamellohirsutum, and M. torsivum. Furthermore, Antić and Makarov redescribed Metamastigophorophyllon giljarovi based on a large sample of specimens (79 males, 37 females, and 10 juveniles), finding that this species has 31 segments in adults and moving this species to the family Anthroleucosomatidae. Moreover, Antić and Makarov deemed Persedicus to be a junior synonym of Metamastigophorophyllon, and authorities now consider Metamastigophorophyllon martensi to be the valid name for the species described by Mauriès.

== Description ==
Adults in this genus have 31 segments, one segment more than usually observed in adults in the order Chordeumatida. Accordingly, adult females in this genus have 52 pairs of legs, two more than usually found in chordeumatidans. In males, the eighth and ninth leg pairs become gonopods in adults, leaving adult males with 50 pairs of walking legs, excluding the gonopods.

Males in this genus range from 10 mm to 15 mm in length, whereas females range from 11 mm to 19 mm in length. In males, the five leg pairs in front of the gonopods are enlarged. The anterior gonopods have an especially distinctive shape, with a medial part and two lateral branches, one inner branch and one outer branch. The inner branch is subdivided into an anterior part and a posterior part. The shape of these gonopods distinguish this genus from the other genera in the family Anthroleucosomatidae.

== Development ==
Like other genera in this order, this genus is teloanamorphic, adding segments and legs through a series of molts until the adult stage, when the molting stops and the adult emerges with a final number of segments and legs. To arrive at 31 segments as adults, however, species in this genus must deviate from the anamorphosis usually observed in the order Chordeumatida. Little is known about post-embryonic development in this genus, but Mauriès found juveniles of M. martensi with 27 and 29 segments. These numbers match the segments Mauriès found in the penultimate and adult stages of development in the genus Tianella, the only other genus in the order Chordeumatida with an odd number of segments in adults. He also observed the rudiments of four leg pairs in the two legless segments behind the 48 pairs of legs in Tianella adults. Based on this evidence, authorities suggest that M. martensi arrives at 31 segments and 52 leg pairs by going through the same stages that Mauriès observed in Tianella, but does not mature until molting once more, adding two segments and four leg pairs in the final stage.

== Species ==
This genus includes five species:

- Metamastigophorophyllon giljarovi (Lang, 1959)
- Metamastigophorophyllon hamatum Antić & Makarov, 2016
- Metamastigophorophyllon lamellohirsutum Antić & Makarov, 2016
- Metamastigophorophyllon martensi (Mauriès, 1982)
- Metamastigophorophyllon torsivum Antić & Makarov, 2016
