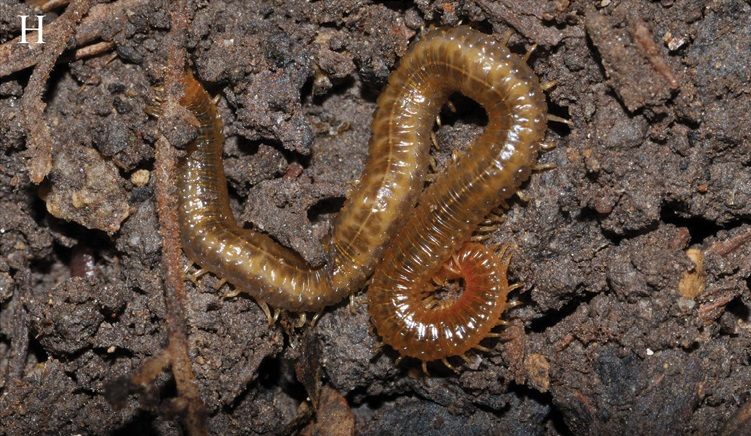

Scientific classification
- Kingdom: Animalia
- Phylum: Arthropoda
- Subphylum: Myriapoda
- Class: Chilopoda
- Order: Geophilomorpha
- Family: Geophilidae
- Genus: Henia
- Species: H. vesuviana

Binomial name
- Henia vesuviana (Newport, 1845)

= Henia vesuviana =

Species of geophilid centipede

The white-striped centipede (Henia vesuviana, formerly Chaetechelyne vesuviana), is a species of soil centipede belonging to the family Dignathodontidae.

== Description ==
This is a long and slender species, reaching lengths of up to 95 mm (3.7 in) in mainland Europe. It is one of the few geophilomorph species to be identifiable in the field, with a distinct greyish colouration, orange-yellow head and rear, short terminal legs and thick mid-body. It can have anywhere between 57 and 87 leg pairs, with British specimens tending towards the middle of that range. There also exists sexual dimorphism in leg count, with males generally having fewer legs than females. It gains its common name from the distinct white dorsal blood vessel running along the length of the body.

== Behaviour ==
This species spends the day under cover such as logs and stones, often curled up in a ball with its underside facing outward. It is able to secrete a sticky liquid from the ventral side of its segments when attacked, as demonstrated by an experiment conducted with the devil's coach horse beetle (Ocypus olens). Not much is known of its diet, but it has been observed feeding on a millipede of the family Blaniulidae.

== Habitat and distribution ==
It is distributed throughout Western Europe, as far east as Austria. In the United Kingdom, it is considered Nationally Scarce, but is fairly frequent in the Greater London area and in coastal regions. It has been shown to prefer urban sites and arable soils.
