= Henia brevis =

Scientific classification
- Domain: Eukaryota
- Kingdom: Animalia
- Phylum: Arthropoda
- Subphylum: Myriapoda
- Class: Chilopoda
- Order: Geophilomorpha
- Family: Dignathodontidae
- Genus: Henia
- Species: H. brevis

Binomial name
- Henia brevis (Silvestri, 1896)

Synonyms
- Chaetechelyne montana oblongocribellata Verhoeff, 1898; Henia (Pseudochaetechelyne) brevis (Silvestri, 1896)

Species of centipede

Henia brevis, commonly called the southern garden centipede, is a species of centipede in the family Dignathodontidae.

== Description ==
Henia brevis is pallid in colour and has 53–57 pairs of legs. It is up to 19 mm (0.75 in) long.

== Habitat ==
Henia brevis lives in terrestrial habitats in southern Ireland, southern England, as well as in Europe and Corsica. It is usually found in urban or sub-urban sites.
