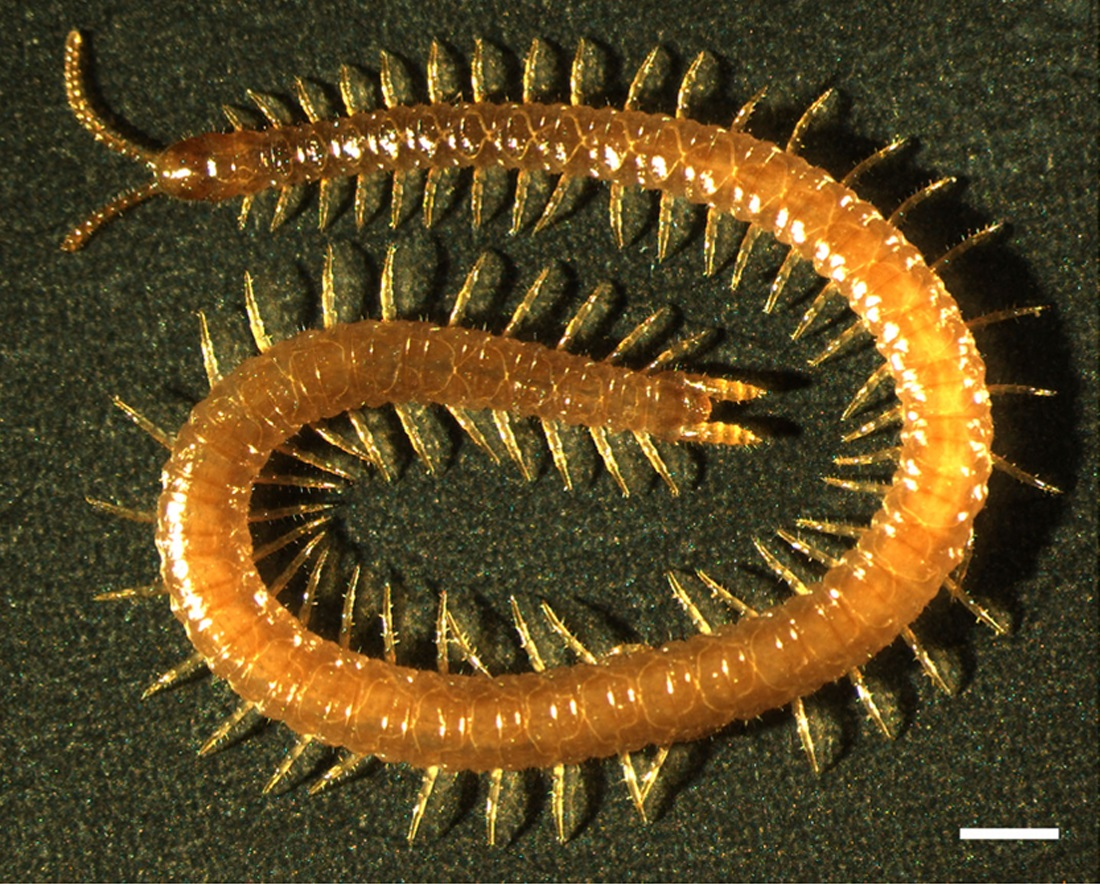
- Strigamia maritima

Scientific classification
- Kingdom: Animalia
- Phylum: Arthropoda
- Subphylum: Myriapoda
- Class: Chilopoda
- Order: Geophilomorpha
- Family: Geophilidae
- Subfamily: Linotaeniinae
- Genus: Strigamia; Gray, 1843

Type species
- Strigamia fulva Sager, 1856

Synonyms
- Diplochora Attems, 1903; Korynia Chamberlin, 1941; Leptodampius Chamberlin, 1938; Linotaenia C.L Koch, 1847; Paraplanes Verhoeff, 1933; Scolioplanes Bergsoe & Meinert, 1866; Tomotaenia Cook, 1895

= Strigamia =

Genus of centipedes

Strigamia is a genus of soil centipedes in the subfamily Linotaeniinae, a clade formerly known as the family Linotaeniidae, but now deemed a subfamily within the family Geophilidae. This genus is among the most widespread genera in the order Geophilomorpha. These centipedes are found in temperate parts of the Holarctic region, including much of North America and Eurasia.

== Description ==
Species in this genus feature bodies that taper toward both the anterior and posterior ends. The head is about as long as wide. The coxosternite of the first maxillae is entire rather than divided. The forcipular sternite is wider than long and lacks chitin lines. The forcipules (venom-injecting fangs) are relatively short but each feature four distinct articles, with a large denticle at the base of the ultimate article but no denticle on the first article. The sternites feature paired fields of pores. The basal element of the ultimate legs features pores on the ventral side only. These legs are about as long as the penultimate pair, and each leg features six articles and ends in a claw. The ultimate legs are distinctly swollen in the male.

Centipedes in this genus can reach 15 cm in length (in the North American species S. epileptica) and can have as few as 31 pairs of legs (in the Taiwanese species, S. nana, with 31 to 35 in both sexes, and in the North American species S. hoffmani, with 31 to 35 pairs in males, 35 or 37 in females) or as many as 83 leg pairs (in S. epileptica, with 65 to 69 pairs in males, 71 to 83 in females). Other species with notably few legs include the Siberian species S. sibirica (33 pairs in males, 33 or 35 in females), the Japanese species S. korsosi (33 or 35 in males, 35 or 37 in females), and the Romanian species S. lutea (35 pairs in males, 37 in females). The species S. nana and S. korsosi are notable for their small sizes (no more than 15 mm long) as well as for their modest number of legs.

== Taxonomy ==
The genus name Strigamia was introduced in 1843 by T. Rymer Jones, who gave credit to John Edward Gray as the author of this name. Although some references place this genus in the family Linotaeniidae, authorities deemed Linotaeniidae to be a junior synonym of Geophilidae in 2014 based on a phylogenetic analysis of the order Geophilomorpha using both morphological and molecular data. Authorities now place this genus in the family Geophilidae instead, but within the subfamily Linotaeniinae.

== Species ==
The genus Strigamia contains more than 40 valid species, including the following:

- Strigamia acuminata Leach (1816)^{c g}
- Strigamia alokosternum Attems (1927)^{c g}
- Strigamia auxa Chamberlin, 1954^{g}
- Strigamia bicolor Shinohara 1981^{c g}
- Strigamia bidens Wood, 1862^{c g b}
- Strigamia bothriopus Wood, 1862^{c g b}
- Strigamia branneri Bollman C.H. (1888)^{c g b}
- Strigamia carmela Chamberlin, 1941^{g}
- Strigamia caucasia Verhoeff (1938)^{c g}
- Strigamia cephalica Wood 1862^{c g}
- Strigamia chionophila Wood, 1862^{c g b}
- Strigamia cottiana Verhoeff (1935)^{c g}
- Strigamia crassipes Koch (1835)^{c g}
- Strigamia crinita Attems (1929)^{c g}
- Strigamia engadina Verhoeff (1935)^{c g}
- Strigamia epileptica Wood, 1862^{c g b}
- Strigamia exul Meinert (1886)^{c g}
- Strigamia filicornis Wood 1862^{c g}
- Strigamia fulva Sager 1856^{c g}
- Strigamia fusata Attems, 1903^{g}
- Strigamia gracilis Wood 1867^{c g}
- Strigamia herzegowinensis Verhoeff (1935)^{c g}
- Strigamia hirsutipes Attems (1927)^{c g}
- Strigamia hoffmani Pereira, 2009^{g}
- Strigamia inthanoni Bonato, Bortolin, Drago, Orlando and Dányi, 2017^{i g}
- Strigamia japonica Verhoeff (1935)^{c g}
- Strigamia kerrana Chamberlin (1940)^{c g}
- Strigamia laevipes Wood 1862^{c g}
- Strigamia lampra Chamberlin, 1938^{g}
- Strigamia longicornis Meinert (1886)^{c g}
- Strigamia lutea Matic, 1985^{g}
- Strigamia maculaticeps Wood 1862^{c g}
- Strigamia maritima Leach (1817)^{c g}
- Strigamia monopora Takakuwa (1938)^{c g}
- Strigamia munda Chamberlin (1952)^{c g}
- Strigamia olympica Dobroruka 1977^{c g}
- Strigamia parviceps Wood 1862^{c g}
- Strigamia paucipora Matic, 1985^{g}
- Strigamia platydentata Shinohara 1981^{c g}
- Strigamia pseudopusillus Loksa (1962)^{c g}
- Strigamia pusilla Seliwanoff (1884)^{c g}
- Strigamia sacolinensis Meinert (1870)^{c g}
- Strigamia sibirica Sseliwanoff (1881)^{c g}
- Strigamia sulcata Seliwanoff, 1881^{g}
- Strigamia svenhedini Verhoeff, 1933^{g}
- Strigamia taeniophera Wood 1862^{c g}
- Strigamia tenuiungulata Takakuwa, 1938^{g}
- Strigamia texensis Chamberlin, 1941^{g}
- Strigamia transsilvanica Verhoeff (1928)^{c g}
- Strigamia tripora Chamberlin, 1941^{g}
- Strigamia tropica Wood 1862^{c g}
- Strigamia urania Crabill, 1954^{g}
- Strigamia walkeri Wood 1865^{c g}

Data sources: i = ITIS, c = Catalogue of Life, g = GBIF, b = Bugguide.net
