= Julus scanicus =

Scientific classification
- Kingdom: Animalia
- Phylum: Arthropoda
- Subphylum: Myriapoda
- Class: Diplopoda
- Order: Julida
- Family: Julidae
- Genus: Julus
- Species: J. scanicus

Binomial name
- Julus scanicus Lohmander, 1925

Species of millipede

Julus scanicus is a species of millipede from the Julidae family that can be found in Austria, Belarus, Czech Republic, Denmark, Estonia, Germany, Latvia, and Slovakia.
