= Julus terrestris =

Scientific classification
- Kingdom: Animalia
- Phylum: Arthropoda
- Subphylum: Myriapoda
- Class: Diplopoda
- Order: Julida
- Family: Julidae
- Genus: Julus
- Species: J. terrestris

Binomial name
- Julus terrestris Linnaeus, 1758

Species of millipede

Julus terrestris is a species of millipede from the family Julidae. It was described by Carl Linnaeus in his landmark 1758 10th edition of Systema Naturae. The species can be found in Austria, the Baltic states, Belarus, the Czech Republic, Finland, Germany, Hungary, Poland, Romania, Slovakia, Ukraine, Scandinavia (except Norway), and all countries of the former Yugoslavia (except Bosnia and Herzegovina, North Macedonia, and Slovenia).
