= Cesachile =

Scientific classification
- Kingdom: Animalia
- Phylum: Arthropoda
- Subphylum: Myriapoda
- Class: Chilopoda
- Order: Geophilomorpha
- Family: Linotaeniidae
- Genus: Cesachile; Koçak & Kemal, 2008
- Species: C. araucanensis

Binomial name
- Cesachile araucanensis (Silvestri, 1889)

Synonyms
- Araucania Chamberlin, 1956 (Preocc.); Chileana Özdikmen, 2009; Linotaenia araucanensis Silvestri, 1899

Genus of centipedes

Cesachile is a genus of soil centipedes formerly placed in the family Linotaeniidae, which is now deemed to be a clade in the family Geophilidae. Centipedes in this genus are found in southern Chile. This genus currently includes only one species, C. araucanensis. Females of this species are about 30mm long, with a pale yellow body and a red head; bearing 12–15 pleural pores; long, tapering antennae with sparse basal sections and rather hairy distal sections; and a labrum with four median tubercles bearing a few cilia on the sides. Males have 10 pleural pores, thick ultimate legs armed with claws, and 43 leg pairs.

== Taxonomy ==
Cesachile araucanensis was originally named Linotaenia araucanensis Silvestri, 1899, and it was later moved to the genus Araucania Chamberlin, 1956. However, Araucania Chamberlin was found to be a junior homonym of Araucania Pate, 1947, and was renamed Cesachile Koçak & Kemal in 2008, and unnecessarily renamed yet again as "Chileana" by Özdikmen in 2009.
