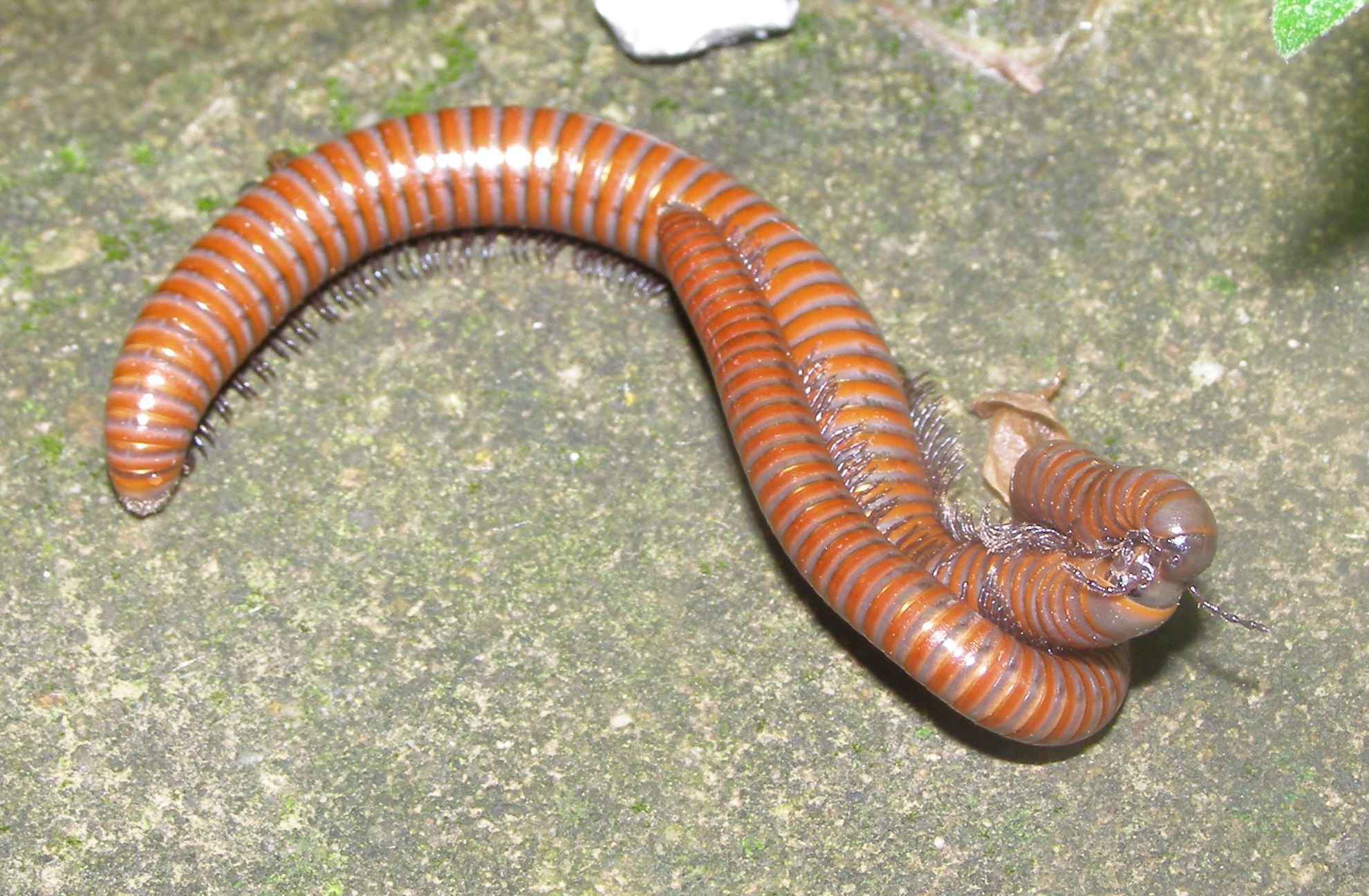
- Mating pair of Julus carpathicus

Scientific classification
- Kingdom: Animalia
- Phylum: Arthropoda
- Subphylum: Myriapoda
- Class: Diplopoda
- Order: Julida
- Family: Julidae
- Tribe: Julini
- Genus: Julus; Linnaeus, 1758

Species
- See text

= Julus (millipede) =

Genus of millipedes

Julus (alternately written as Iulus) is a genus of millipedes in the family Julidae, containing the following species:

- Julus abbreviatus Mikan, 1834
- Julus acriculus Karsch, 1881
- Julus adensameri Verhoeff, 1897
- Julus affinis Brandt, 1840
- Julus aimatopodus Risso, 1826
- Julus albovittatus Verhoeff, 1894
- Julus aleator Pocock, 1895
- Julus anceps Boheman, 1869
- Julus anguinus Karsch, 1880
- Julus apiculatus Mikan, 1834
- Julus appendiculatus Brandt, 1841
- Julus araneoides Pallas, 1772
- Julus arboreus Saussure, 1859
- Julus atticus Karsch, 1888
- Julus bahiensis Brandt, 1841
- Julus baldensis Verhoeff, 1896
- Julus balearicus L. Koch, 1882
- Julus barbatus Verhoeff, 1910
- Julus barroisi Porat, 1893
- Julus beauvoaisii Gervais, 1837
- Julus beauvoisii Gervais, 1847
- Julus bermudanus Chamberlin, 1920
- Julus bicolor Mikan, 1834
- Julus bicuspidatus Brandt, 1841
- Julus bimarginatus Gervais, 1847
- Julus bioculatus Gervais & Goudot, 1844
- Julus blainvillei Leguillou, 1841
- Julus blasioi Fanzago, 1880
- Julus boveanus Gervais, 1837
- Julus bovinus Attems, 1900
- Julus brevicornis Brandt, 1841
- Julus caesar Karsch, 1881
- Julus caesius Wood, 1867
- Julus canariensis Pocock, 1893
- Julus capensis Brandt, 1841
- Julus carpathicus Verhoeff, 1907
- Julus caucasicus Karsch, 1881
- Julus cavicola Grinnell, 1908
- Julus ceilanicus Brandt, 1841
- Julus ciliatus Verhoeff, 1897
- Julus cinerefrons Wood, 1864
- Julus colchicus Lohmander, 1936
- Julus colubrinus Fredrizzi
- Julus conformis C. L. Koch, 1863
- Julus corticalis Lucas, 1846
- Julus crassicornis Mikan, 1834
- Julus curiosus Karsch, 1881
- Julus curvicornis Verhoeff, 1899
- Julus dalmaticus C. L. Koch, 1847
- Julus dalmatinus Attems, 1904
- Julus decaisneus Gervais, 1837
- Julus dentosus Mikan, 1834
- Julus dietli Verhoeff, 1898
- Julus dilatatus Mikan, 1834
- Julus distinctus Lucas, 1846
- Julus erythropareidus Brandt, 1841
- Julus eydouxii Gervais, 1847
- Julus feae Pocock, 1893
- Julus festivus Perty, 1833
- Julus fijiensis Colenso, 1893
- Julus filicornis Saussure, 1859
- Julus flavofasciatus Brandt, 1841
- Julus flavotaeniatus Brandt, 1841
- Julus florissantellus Cockerell, 1907
- Julus fucatus Karsch, 1881
- Julus fuscus Linnaeus, 1758
- Julus gaimardi Gervais, 1847
- Julus ghilarovi Gulicka, 1963
- Julus gilvolineatus L. Koch, 1882
- Julus gracilicornis Brandt, 1841
- Julus grandis Brandt, 1841
- Julus guerinii Brandt, 1841
- Julus hamulosus Mikan, 1834
- Julus insignis Saussure, 1860
- Julus insulanus L. Koch, 1882
- Julus jedryczkowskii Golovatch, 1981
- Julus kandyanus Humbert, 1865
- Julus kubanus Verhoeff, 1921
- Julus lagurus Gervais, 1847
- Julus lapidarius Lucas, 1846
- Julus laticollis Brandt, 1841
- Julus lepidus Porat, 1876
- Julus leucopus Gervais, 1847
- Julus lignaui Verhoeff, 1910
- Julus litoreus Lignau, 1904
- Julus longipes Le Guillou, 1841
- Julus lunelii Humbert, 1865
- Julus madagascariensis Gervais, 1847
- Julus malabaricus Gervais, 1847
- Julus marcgravii Brandt, 1841
- Julus melancholicus C. L. Koch, 1847
- Julus melanopygus Brandt, 1841
- Julus milesii Wood, 1864
- Julus modestus Risso, 1826
- Julus moebiusi Verhoeff, 1897
- Julus molleri Verhoeff, 1892
- Julus nesophilus Chamberlin, 1920
- Julus nitens Murray, 1877
- Julus nivicomes Verhoeff, 1901
- Julus occidentalis Grinnell, 1908
- Julus occultus Verhoeff, 1893>
- Julus oliveirae Verhoeff, 1893
- Julus ovale Linnaeus, 1788
- Julus pachysoma Brandt, 1841
- Julus philippensis Gervais, 1847
- Julus pilipes Newport, 1844
- Julus pilosiscuta Wood, 1864
- Julus pinnatus Mikan, 1834
- Julus placidus Lignau, 1903
- Julus porathi Verhoeff, 1893
- Julus pubescens Karsch, 1881
- Julus quadripunctatus Fanzago, 1875
- Julus rasilis Karsch, 1881
- Julus rimosus Karsch, 1881
- Julus roissyi Le Guillou, 1841
- Julus rotundatus Brandt, 1841
- Julus ruficeps Brandt, 1841
- Julus rugifrons Meinert, 1868
- Julus rupestris Linnaeus
- Julus scandinavius Latzel, 1884
- Julus scanicus Lohmander, 1925
- Julus serrulatus Mikan, 1834
- Julus seticaudus Porat, 1876
- Julus silvivagus Verhoeff, 1898
- Julus solitarius Pocock, 1893
- Julus steini Karsch, 1881
- Julus stictus Latzel, 1882
- Julus striolatus Gervais, 1847
- Julus subalpinus Lohmander, 1936
- Julus subuniplicatus Brandt, 1841
- Julus sumatrensis Gervais, 1847
- Julus surinamensis Brandt, 1841
- Julus tarascus Saussure, 1860
- Julus terrestris Linnaeus, 1758
- Julus teutonicus Pocock, 1900
- Julus thomasii Pocock, 1895
- Julus tomosvaryi Daday, 1889
- Julus tonginus Karsch, 1881
- Julus trigonyger Brandt, 1841
- Julus trilobatus Verhoeff, 1894
- Julus trimarginatus Gervais, 1847
- Julus triplicatus Brandt, 1841
- Julus tristani Pocock, 1893
- Julus tuberculosus Mikan, 1834
- Julus tussilaginis Verhoeff, 1907
- Julus validus Brandt, 1841
- Julus vermiformis Gervais, 1847
- Julus vieirae Verhoeff, 1901
- Julus walckenaerii Brandt, 1841
- Julus zameniscolor Fanzago, 1880
