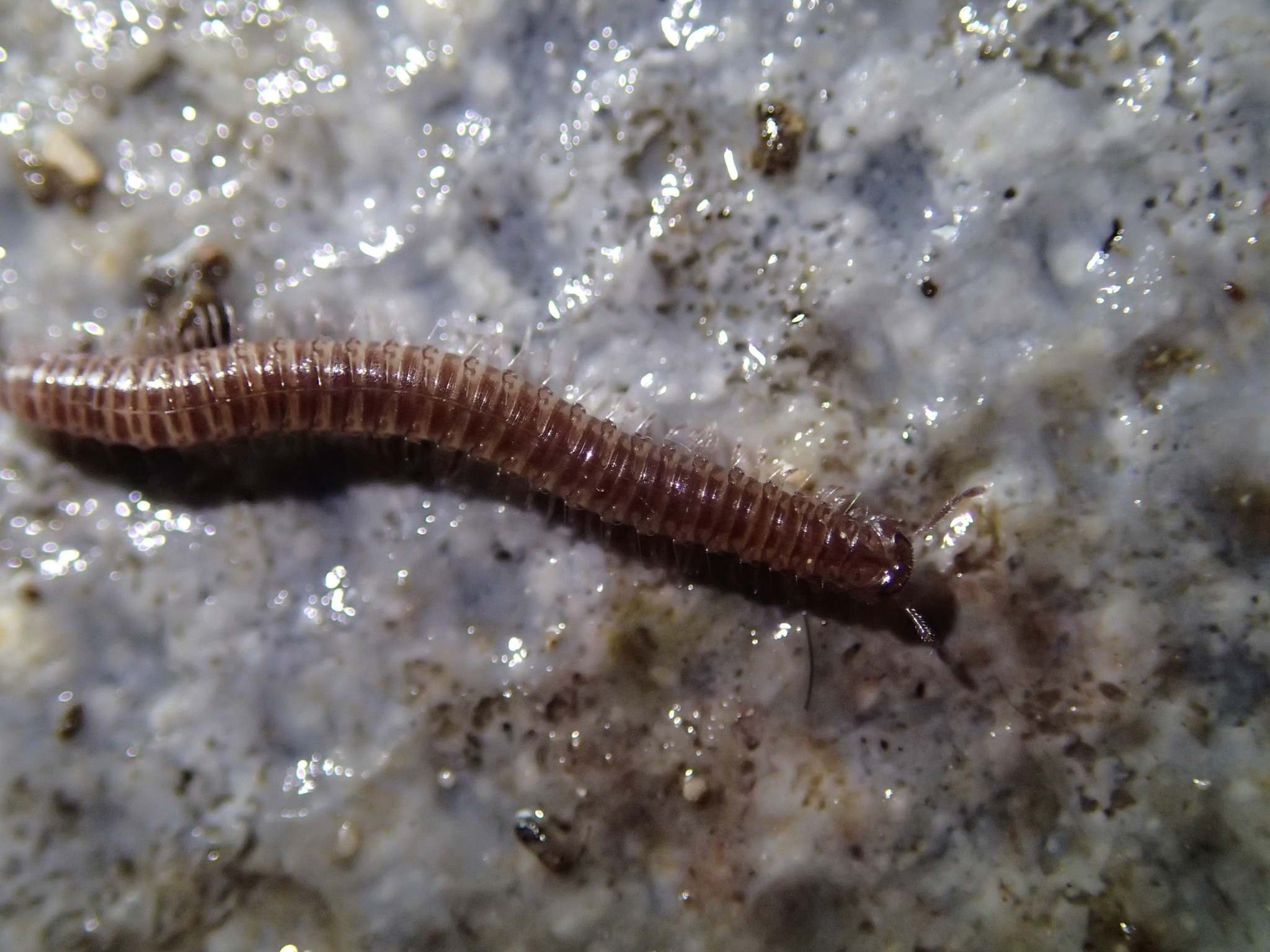
- Anamastigona, Italy

Scientific classification
- Kingdom: Animalia
- Phylum: Arthropoda
- Subphylum: Myriapoda
- Class: Diplopoda
- Order: Chordeumatida
- Superfamily: Anthroleucosomatoidea
- Family: Anthroleucosomatidae; Verhoeff, 1899

= Anthroleucosomatidae =

Family of millipedes

Anthroleucosomatidae is a family of millipedes in the order Chordeumatida. This family includes more than 100 species distributed among 40 genera. This family has a mostly Holarctic distribution, with the greatest diversity in the area around the Mediterranean sea.

== Description ==
These millipedes range from 3.5 mm to 28 mm in length. Both the anterior and posterior gonopods lack flagella. The posterior gonopods are much simpler, with a strong plate-like sternum and normally one to three segments. Adult millipedes in this family have 26, 28, 30, or 31 segments (counting the collum as the first segment and the telson as the last). This family includes Metamastigophorophyllon, notable as the only chordeumatidan genus with 31 segments.

== Genera ==
The family Anthroleucosomatidae includes the following genera:

- Acanthophorella Antic & Makarov, 2016
- Adshardicus Golovatch, 1981
- Alloiopus Attems, 1951
- Alpinella Antic & Makarov, 2016
- Anamastigona Silvestri, 1898
- Anthroleucosoma Verhoeff, 1899
- Banatosoma Curcic & Makarov, 2000
- Belbogosoma Curcic & Makarov, 2008
- Brachychaetosoma Antic & Makarov, 2016
- Bulgardicus Strasser, 1960
- Bulgarosoma Verhoeff, 1926
- Caucaseuma Strasser, 1970
- Caucasominorus Antic & Makarov, 2016
- Cornogonopus Antic, 2020
- Cryptacanthophorella Antic & Makarov, 2016
- Dacosoma Tabacaru, 1967
- Dazbogosoma Makarov & Curcic, 2012
- Dentatosoma Antic & Makarov, 2016
- Enghoffiella Antic & Makarov, 2016
- Flagellophorella Antic & Makarov, 2016
- Georgiosoma Antic & Makarov, 2016
- Ghilarovia Gulicka, 1972
- Golovatchosoma Antic & Makarov, 2016
- Herculina Antic & Makarov, 2016
- Heterocaucaseuma Antic & Makarov, 2016
- Krueperia Verhoeff, 1900
- Leschius Shear & Leonard, 2004
- Metamastigophorophyllon Ceuca, 1976
- Paranotosoma Antic & Makarov, 2016
- Perunosoma Curcic & Makarov, 2007
- Pseudoflagellophorella Antic & Makarov, 2016
- Ratcheuma Golovatch, 1985
- Rhodoposoma Curcic & Makarov, 2000
- Serbosoma Curcic & Makarov, 2000
- Stygiosoma Gulicka, 1967
- Svarogosoma Makarov, 2003
- Troglodicus Gulicka, 1967
- Vegrandosoma Antic & Makarov, 2016
