= Lithobius muticus =

Scientific classification
- Kingdom: Animalia
- Phylum: Arthropoda
- Subphylum: Myriapoda
- Class: Chilopoda
- Order: Lithobiomorpha
- Family: Lithobiidae
- Genus: Lithobius
- Species: L. muticus

Binomial name
- Lithobius muticus (C. L. Koch, 1847)

Synonyms
- Lithobius cinnamomueus L. Koch, 1862; Lithobius bicolor Tömösváry, 1879; Lithobius sexdentatus Verhoeff, 1937; Lithobius triodontus Matic & Ceuca, 1970

Species of centipede

Lithobius muticus is a centipede of the family Lithobiidae.

== Description ==
The species has 2 + 2 forcipular teeth that lack backward projections on tergites 9, 11 and 13. Lithobius muticus is very dark in colour, almost black, similar to Lithobius calcaratus. Males, and to a lesser extent, females, are characterised by broad heads and a single claw on the last legs. The specific name muticus means "curtailed, docked."

== Distribution and habitat ==
The species is found in Ireland, southern England and Europe. It lives in deciduous woodland and leaf litter.
