= Stosatea italica =

Scientific classification
- Kingdom: Animalia
- Phylum: Arthropoda
- Subphylum: Myriapoda
- Class: Diplopoda
- Order: Polydesmida
- Family: Paradoxosomatidae
- Genus: Stosatea
- Species: S. italica

Binomial name
- Stosatea italica (Latzel, 1886)

Synonyms
- Entothalassinium italicum (Latzel, 1886); Strongylosoma italicum Latzel, 1886; Strongylosoma italica Latzel, 1886; Strongylosoma aenariense Verhoeff, 1941; Strongylosoma cerii Verhoeff, 1942; Strongylosoma denticulata Attems, 1937; Strongylosoma gallicum Latzel, 1886; Strongylosoma mediterraneum Daday, 1891; Strongylosoma rubidum Verhoeff, 1951; Strongylosoma soratium Verhoeff, 1951

Species of millipede

Stosatea italica is a species of millipede in the family Paradoxosomatidae.

== Description ==
Stosatea italica has a smooth dark body and pale paranota. It can grow as long as 20 cm (7.9 in).

== Habitat ==
Stosatea italica lives in terrestrial habitats in southern Ireland, southern England and Wales. It is also found throughout France.
