= Henia =

Henia may refer to:

- Henia brevis, southern garden centipede, species of centipede in the family Dignathodontidae
- Henia vesuviana, white-striped centipede, soil centipede belonging to the family Dignathodontidae
- Henia-Camiare, indigenous group in Argentine provinces of Córdoba and San Luis
- Henia Bryer (born 1925), Polish educator
- Kaouther Ben Henia (born 1977), Tunisian filmmaker
- Sammy Henia-Kamau (born 2006), Kenyan footballer
