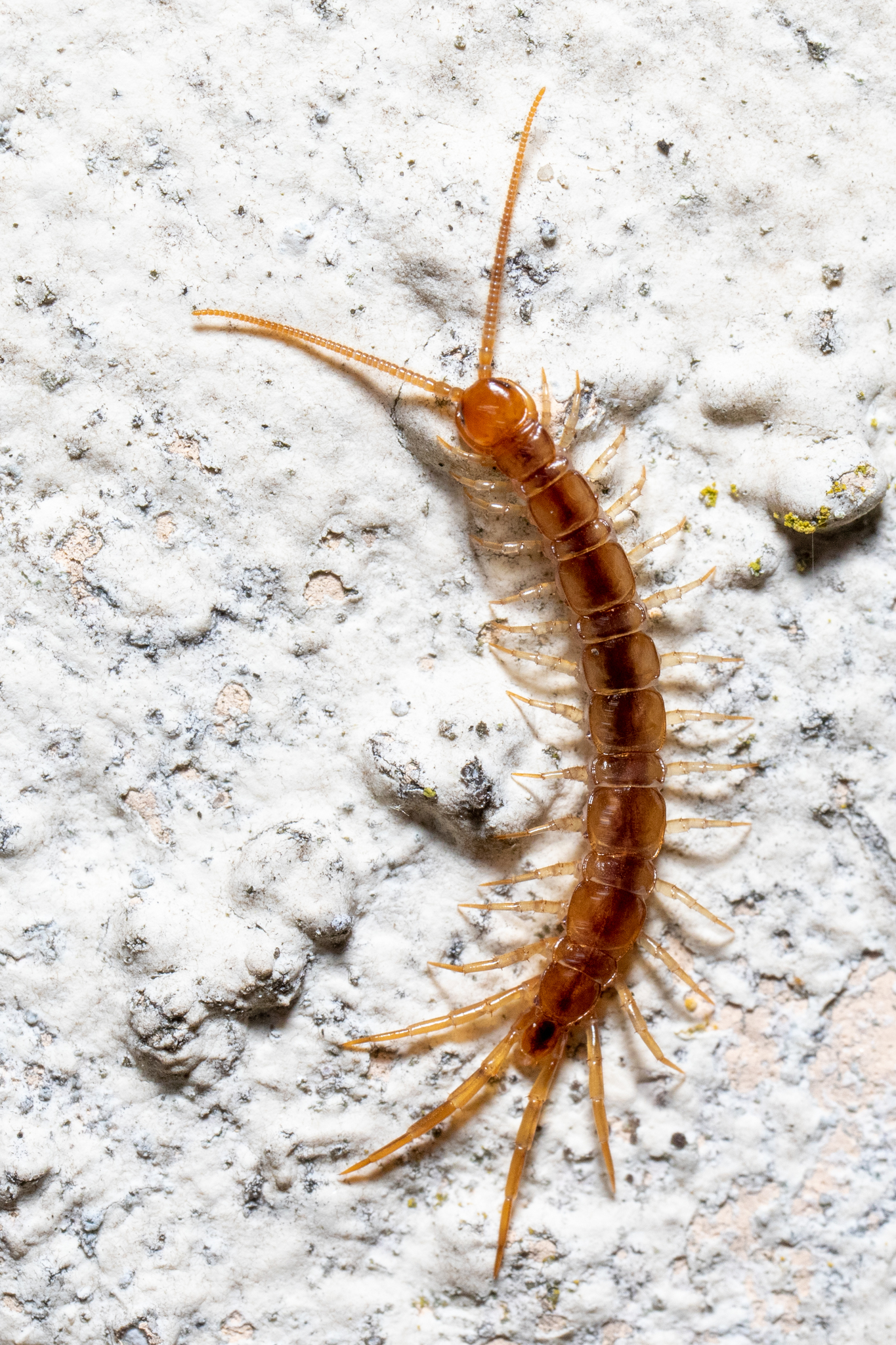

Scientific classification
- Kingdom: Animalia
- Phylum: Arthropoda
- Subphylum: Myriapoda
- Class: Chilopoda
- Order: Lithobiomorpha
- Family: Lithobiidae
- Genus: Lithobius
- Species: L. melanops

Binomial name
- Lithobius melanops (Newport, 1845)

= Lithobius melanops =

Species of centipede

Lithobius melanops, sometimes called the garden lithobius or European steppe centipede, is a species of Lithobiomorph centipede that occurs in many parts of the world.

== Description ==
Body length of this species ranges from 11 millimeters to 17 millimeters. The animal's body is fusiform and dorsoventrally flattened, its width can range from 1,5 to 2,5 millimeters. This species is usually of pale brown coloration and has darker longitudinal stripe in the middle of the dorsal side. The key distinguishing features of this species are: antennal articles 32–44, ocelli 10-13 (with posterior ocellus being much larger), forcipular teeth 2+2 (rarely 3+3), 3-6 round pores on each hind coxa, backwards projections on tergites 9, 11 and 13 and 15th leg with double claws (one smaller and one larger). Only possession of all of these features can reliably identify specimen as L. melanops.

== Distribution ==
This species is reported from many parts of the world. In Europe it can be found in Iceland, Ireland, United Kingdom, Spain, France, Belgium, Netherlands, Luxembourg, Switzerland, Germany, Denmark (including Faroe Islands), Norway, Sweden, Finland, Austria, Czechia, Slovakia, Poland, Hungary, Slovenia, Croatia, Bosnia-Herzegovina, Italy, Romania, Bulgaria, Latvia, Lithuania, Ukraine, Russia. In Africa it can be found in Morocco, the Azores, Madeira, Canary islands, Saint Helena and it is also reported from South Africa. In North America it is found in the United States and Canada, it is also reported from Mexico. In South America it is reported from Ecuador, Brazil and Argentina. In Asia it is reported from Israel, the Asian portion of Russia and Kazakhstan. This species is also reported from New Zealand.

== Habitats ==
This centipede is usually found in drier habitats such as steppes, dry hillsides, bright forests, woodlands, heathlands, gardens, and churchyards; it is also found in coastal habitats such as sand dunes, shingle and vegetated sea cliffs. In these habitats it can be found mainly under stones, dead wood, on walls, rock faces and under loose tree bark. It also occurs in synanthropic habitats.

== Life history ==
As all centipedes in the order Lithiobiomorpha, L. melanops exhibits a hemianamorphic life cycle, which is a life cycle that combines elements of anamorphic and epimorphic development. Juveniles possess fewer body segments and legs than adults, the juveniles will acquire more body segments and legs through successive molts until they reach the adult species-specific number. Further molts result in growth of body size and additional anatomical development.

Lithobius melanops is a nocturnal opportunistic predator which feeds on various soil-dwelling invertebrates including earthworms, potworms, small millipedes, springtails, spiders and insect larvae. This species is also an occasional scavenger. It kills its prey by venom which it delivers via forcipules. Venom of Lithobius melanops is not known to be medically significant to humans.

Lithobius melanops can be found all year round.

== Subspecies ==
Outside of its nominotypical subspecies (L. m. melanops), it has 5 other subspecies:

- Lithobius melanops borgei, which occurs in Portugal specifically the Azores, Terceira and Porto Judeo "Agulhas" lava
- Lithobius melanops dayae, which occurs in Morocco, specifically Grotta Daya and Chikker
- Lithobius melanops domusnovae, which occurs in Italy, specifically Grotta di San Giovanni, Domusnovas and Sardegna
- Lithobius melanops protectus, which occurs in Morocco, specifically Grand Atlas and Dj. Tachdirt
- Lithobius melanops tridentatus, which occurs in Morocco, specifically Route de l'Oukaimedene, Tizi n-Ouchchene, Route Talate Malrhene-Oukaimedene and Oukaimedene
