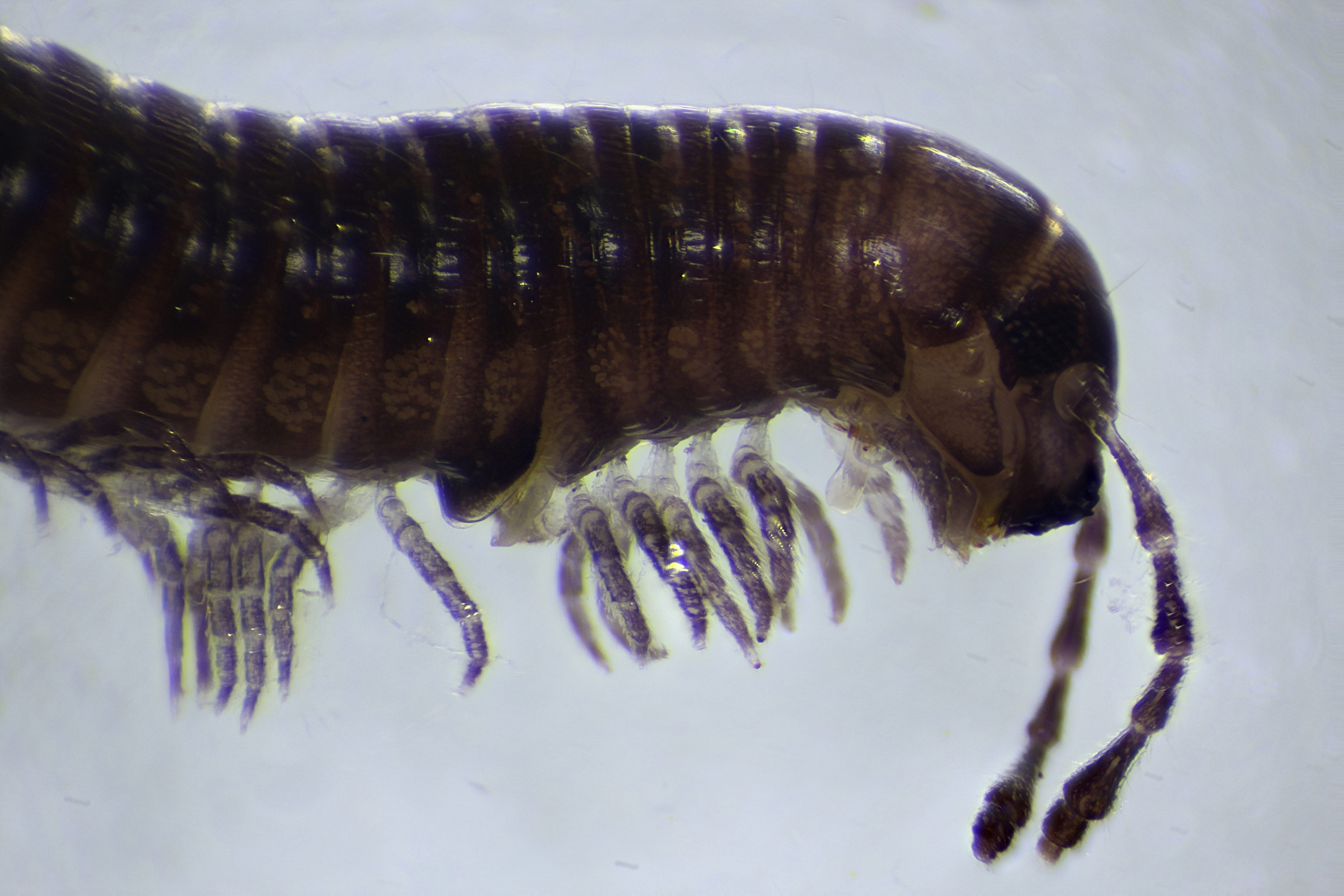

Scientific classification
- Kingdom: Animalia
- Phylum: Arthropoda
- Subphylum: Myriapoda
- Class: Diplopoda
- Order: Julida
- Family: Julidae
- Genus: Julus
- Species: J. scandinavius

Binomial name
- Julus scandinavius Latzel, 1884

Synonyms
- Iulus scandinavius Latzel, 1884; Iulus ligulifer Latzel & Verhoeff, 1891

= Julus scandinavius =

Species of millipede

Julus scandinavius is a species of millipede from Julidae family. It was described by Latzel in 1884 and is found in Austria, Benelux, Czech Republic, France, Germany, Hungary, Ireland, Poland, Slovakia, Switzerland, Britain I. and Scandinavia (except Finland).
