= Geophilus impressus =

Scientific classification
- Kingdom: Animalia
- Phylum: Arthropoda
- Subphylum: Myriapoda
- Class: Chilopoda
- Order: Geophilomorpha
- Family: Geophilidae
- Genus: Geophilus
- Species: G. impressus

Binomial name
- Geophilus impressus C.L. Koch, 1847

Species of centipede

Geophilus impressus is a species of soil centipede in the family Geophilidae. This centipede is widespread throughout Europe and has also been recorded in North Africa. This species can reach 52 mm in length and can feature from 41 to 63 pairs of legs.

== Discovery ==
This species was first described in 1847 by the German zoologist Carl Ludwig Koch. He based the original description of this species on a female specimen found near Pula in the county of Istria in western Croatia. Authorities have been unable to locate the holotype of this species.

== Taxonomy ==
Since the original description of this species, this centipede has been described under many different names. In 2014, the Italian biologists Lucio Bonato and Alessandro Minelli deemed several of these names to be synonyms of G. impressus, including the commonly used names G. insculptus (Attems, 1895) and G. alpinus (Meinert, 1870). Although the name G. alpinus has been used more often than G. impressus, the International Commission on Zoological Nomenclature gives priority to the senior synonym G. impressus over any of the junior synonyms.

== Description ==
G. impressus usually ranges from 15 mm to 35 mm in length but can reach 52 mm in length. This species can have as many as 63 leg pairs, with at least 41 pairs in males and 43 pairs in females. The body is yellowish orange with a darker head. This species exhibits a set of traits that distinguish this species from many other species of Geophilus. For example, the second maxillae in this species each end in a stout tubercle with one or two apical tips. Furthermore, the sternites in this species feature carpophagus structures, in which a peg projecting from the posterior margin of one sternite is associated with a pit or socket in the anterior margin of the next sternite.

== Phylogeny ==
In 1999, a cladistic analysis based on the morphology of ten European species of Geophilus placed G. impressus in a clade with a sister group formed by G. oligopus and G. persephones, which emerge as the closest relatives of G. impressus in a phylogenetic tree. These three close relatives, G. persephones, G. oligopus, and G. impressus, together form a species complex. These three species share many traits, including second maxillae that end in tubercles, carpophagus structures on the anterior sternites, and long setae on the head, trunk, and legs.

The species G. impressus can be distinguished from both of these close relatives, however, based on other traits. For example, this species has two articles on the telopodite of the first maxilla where G. oligopus and G. persephones have only one article. Furthermore, the anterior dorsal sclerite (pretergite) is completely fused with the pleurites on the last leg-bearing segment in G. impressus but not in G. oligopus or G. perspephones. Moreover, G. impressus features more leg pairs than either G. oligopus (no more than 39 in males and 41 in females) or G. persephones (29 in the only specimen).

== Distribution ==
This centipede is found not only in Europe but also in North Africa. In Europe, this species has been recorded in Austria, Bulgaria, Croatia, Denmark, France (not only on the mainland but also in Corsica), Germany, Great Britain, Greece (not only on the mainland but also on the Ionian Islands and Crete), Hungary, Ireland, Italy (not only on the mainland but also in Sicily and Sardinia), Montenegro, the Netherlands, Norway, Poland, Romania, Russia, Slovenia, and Sweden. In North Africa, this species has been recorded in Morocco and Tunisia.

== Habitat ==
This species is found in a diverse set of habitats. In the British Isles, for example, this species can be found in woodland, grassland, gardens, churchyards, and along the coast, where this centipede is most readily found under dead wood or stones. In Sardinia, this centipede is found frequently in the soil between the lower layer of humus and the maximum depth of plant roots, mostly in Quercus ilex woods, but also in maquis, Mediterranean shrubs, open habitats, and sometimes in caves, from sea level up to an elevation of 1,700 meters.
