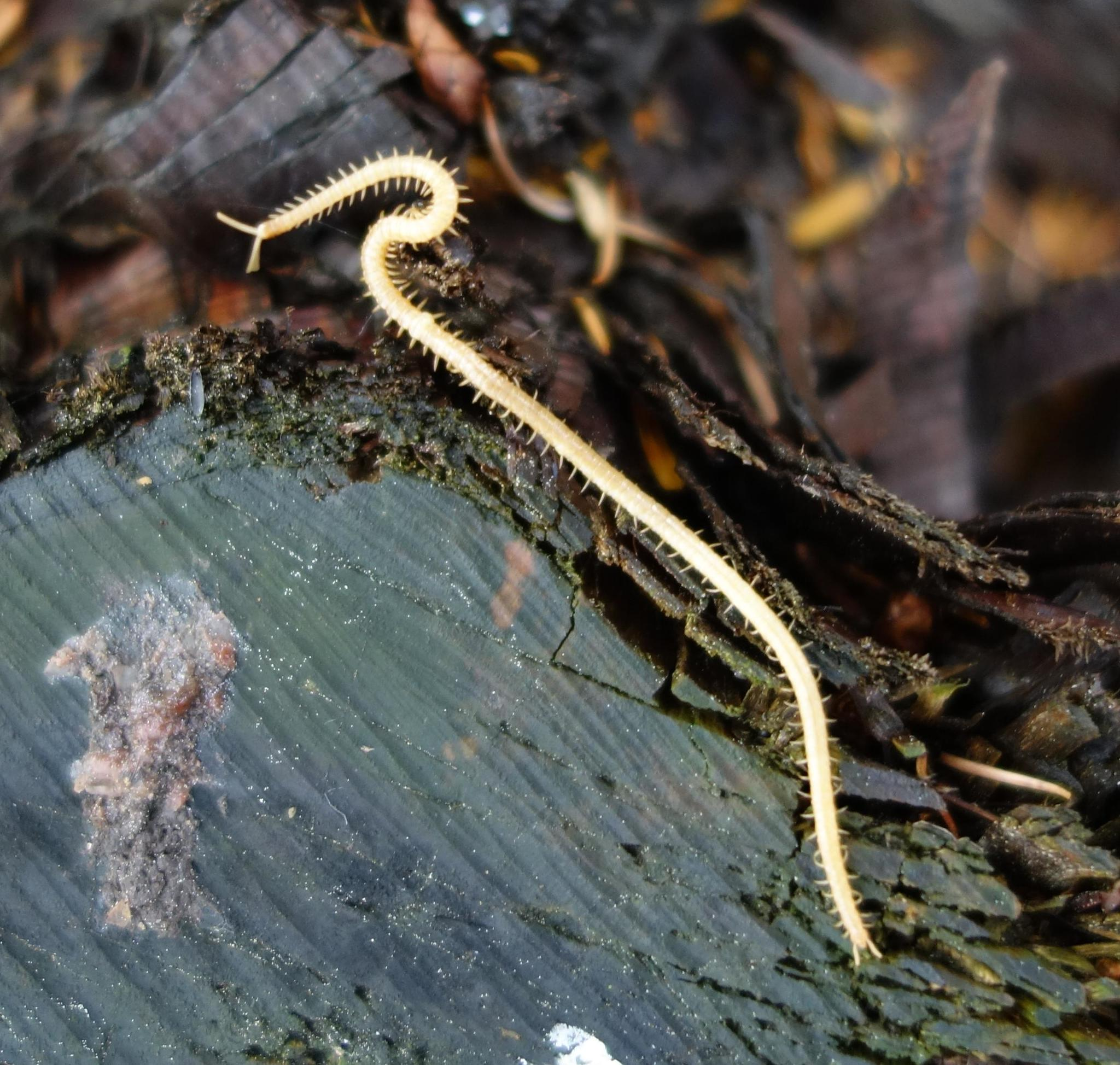
- Henia illyrica

Scientific classification
- Kingdom: Animalia
- Phylum: Arthropoda
- Subphylum: Myriapoda
- Class: Chilopoda
- Order: Geophilomorpha
- Family: Geophilidae
- Clade: Dignathodontidae; Cook, 1896

= Dignathodontidae =

Family of centipedes

Dignathodontidae is a monophyletic clade of soil centipedes in the family Geophilidae found in the Mediterranean region, extending to Macaronesia, Caucasus, and western and central Europe. The clade is characterized by a gradually anteriorly tapered body, a short head with non-attenuated antennae, and a poorly sclerotized labrum with tubercles. The number of legs in this clade varies within as well as among species and ranges from 43 pairs (in Henia brevis) to 153 pairs of legs (in Henia devia). Species in this clade tend to have more leg-bearing segments and greater intraspecific variability in this number than generally found in the family Geophilidae.

Genera:

- Agnathodon Folkmanová & Dobroruka, 1960
- Dignathodon Meinert, 1870
- Henia Koch, 1847
- Pagotaenia Chamberlin, 1915
- Zygophilus Chamberlin, 1952
