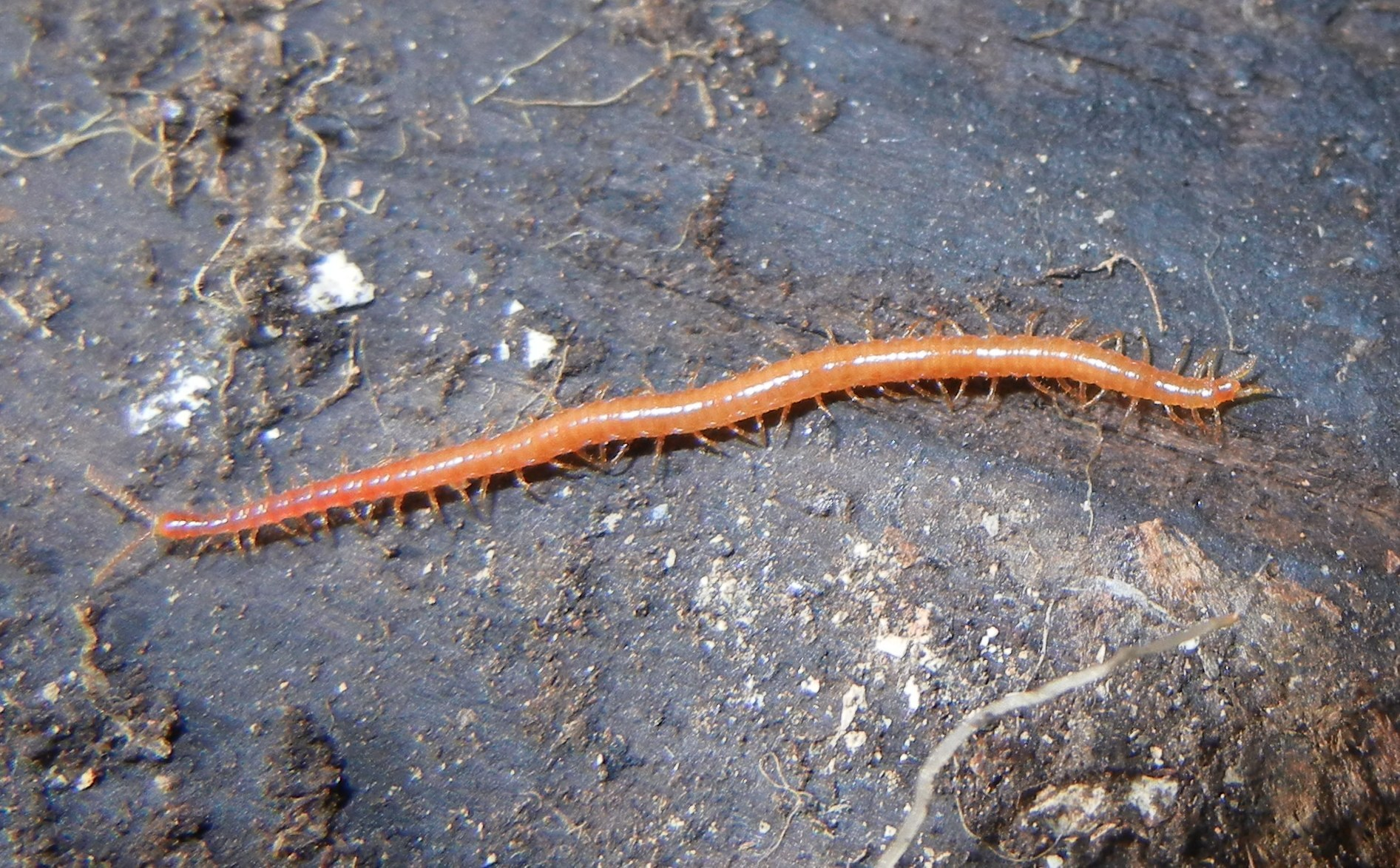
- Photographed in Derbyshire, England

Scientific classification
- Kingdom: Animalia
- Phylum: Arthropoda
- Subphylum: Myriapoda
- Class: Chilopoda
- Order: Geophilomorpha
- Family: Geophilidae
- Genus: Strigamia
- Species: S. acuminata

Binomial name
- Strigamia acuminata (Leach, 1816) (Note: Several sources incorrectly give the date of Leach's description of S. acuminata as 1815.)

Synonyms
- Scolioplanes microdon Attems, 1904; Scolioplanes brevidentatus Verhoeff, 1928; Scolioplanes crinitus Attems, 1929; Scolioplanes pachypus Verhoeff, 1935; Scolioplanes mediterraneus Verhoeff, 1928; Scolioplanes silvaenigrae Verhoeff, 1937

= Strigamia acuminata =

Species of centipede

Strigamia acuminata, commonly called the shorter red centipede, is a species of soil centipede in the subfamily Linotaeniinae, a clade formerly known as the family Linotaeniidae, but now deemed a subfamily within the family Geophilidae.

== Description ==
Strigamia acuminata is red-brown in colour. This species can reach 40 mm in length. Males of this species have 37 to 41 pairs of legs, females have 39 to 43. Like other Strigamia, it has a prominent tooth at the base of the poison claw, and large widely scattered coxal pores on the last legs. The specific name acuminata means "pointed, sharp."

== Habitat ==
Strigamia acuminata lives in woodland habitats in Ireland, southern England and Wales (common in Leicestershire and Rutland), and elsewhere in western and central Europe. It is also recorded in Canada.
