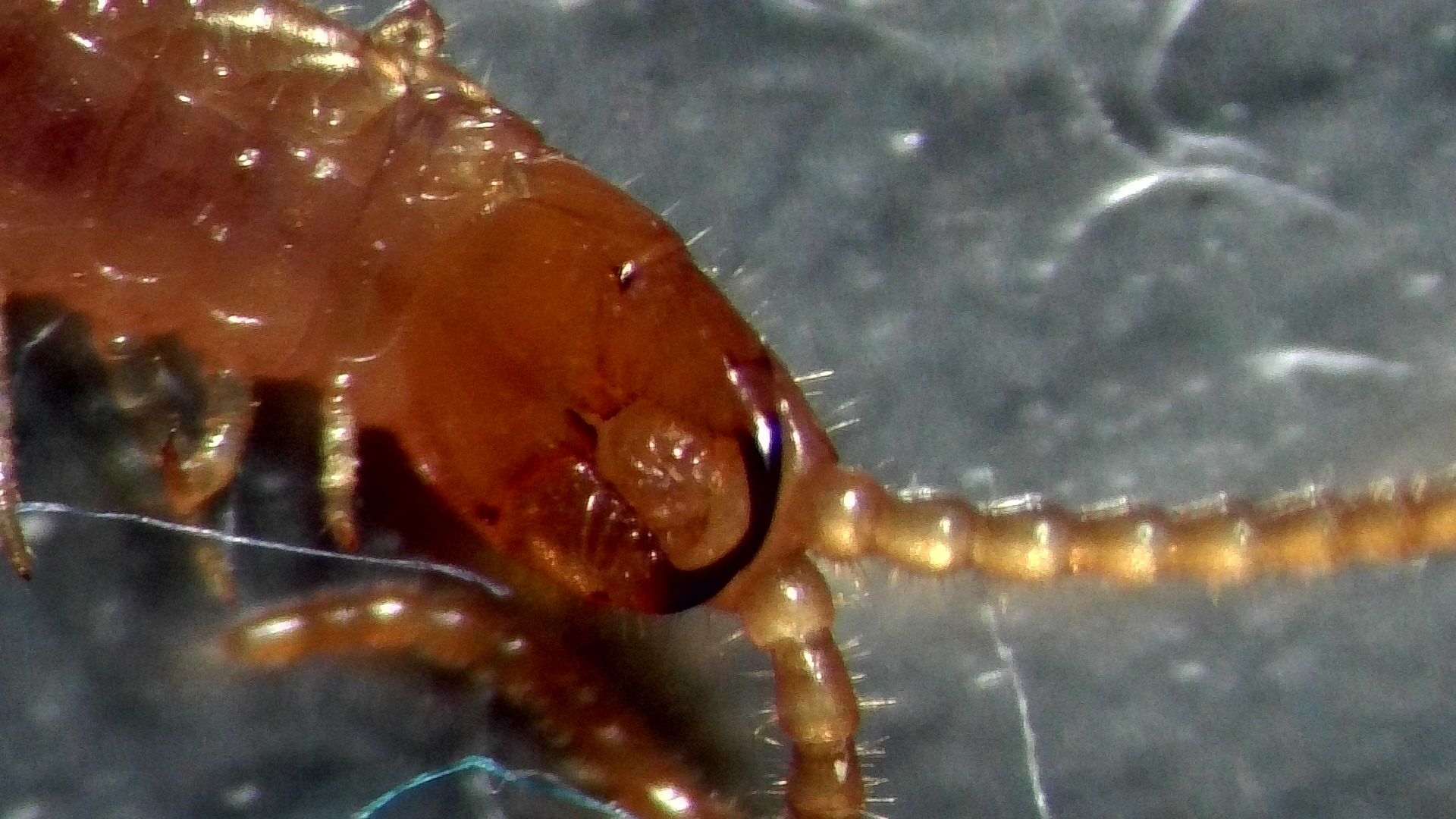

Scientific classification
- Kingdom: Animalia
- Phylum: Arthropoda
- Subphylum: Myriapoda
- Class: Chilopoda
- Order: Geophilomorpha
- Family: Geophilidae
- Genus: Geophilus
- Species: G. easoni

Binomial name
- Geophilus easoni Arthur et al., 2001

= Geophilus easoni =

Species of soil centipede

Geophilus easoni is a species of soil centipede in the family Geophilidae. It is found throughout Britain and Ireland, and through western France to at least to the foothills of the Pyrenees and to Galicia and northern Portugal. It was distinguished from G. carpophagus only in 2001, and most pre-2001 records from the British Isles probably refer to G. easoni. It's typically shorter than G. carpophagus (up to 40 mm), with fewer leg pairs (between 47 and 51), uniform tan/chestnut coloring, and a greater size and number of coxal pores, as well as a darkly pigmented mid-piece of the labrum which bears blunt teeth. Specimens in north-western Iberia typically have a wider range of leg pairs (between 47 and 55) and are larger (up to 55 mm). It nests on the ground surface under stones and dead wood.
