= Geophilus insculptus =

Scientific classification
- Kingdom: Animalia
- Phylum: Arthropoda
- Subphylum: Myriapoda
- Class: Chilopoda
- Order: Geophilomorpha
- Family: Geophilidae
- Genus: Geophilus
- Species: G. insculptus

Binomial name
- Geophilus insculptus (Attems, 1895)

Species of soil centipede

Geophilus insculptus was once considered a species of soil centipede in the family Geophilidae found across temperate Europe, especially Britain and Ireland. The name G. insculptus was deemed to be a junior synonym of G. alpinus, which in turn was deemed to be a junior synonym of G. impressus.

== Etymology ==
The name comes from Latin 'insculptus', meaning 'engraved'.

== Biology ==
Geophilus insculptus is a long (up to 40 mm (1.6 in)) earth centipede or wire worm and is pale yellow in colour with a darker head. It has between 45 and 53 pairs of legs. In the upper layer of the soil, under stones etc. Widespread and fairly frequent in Britain.
