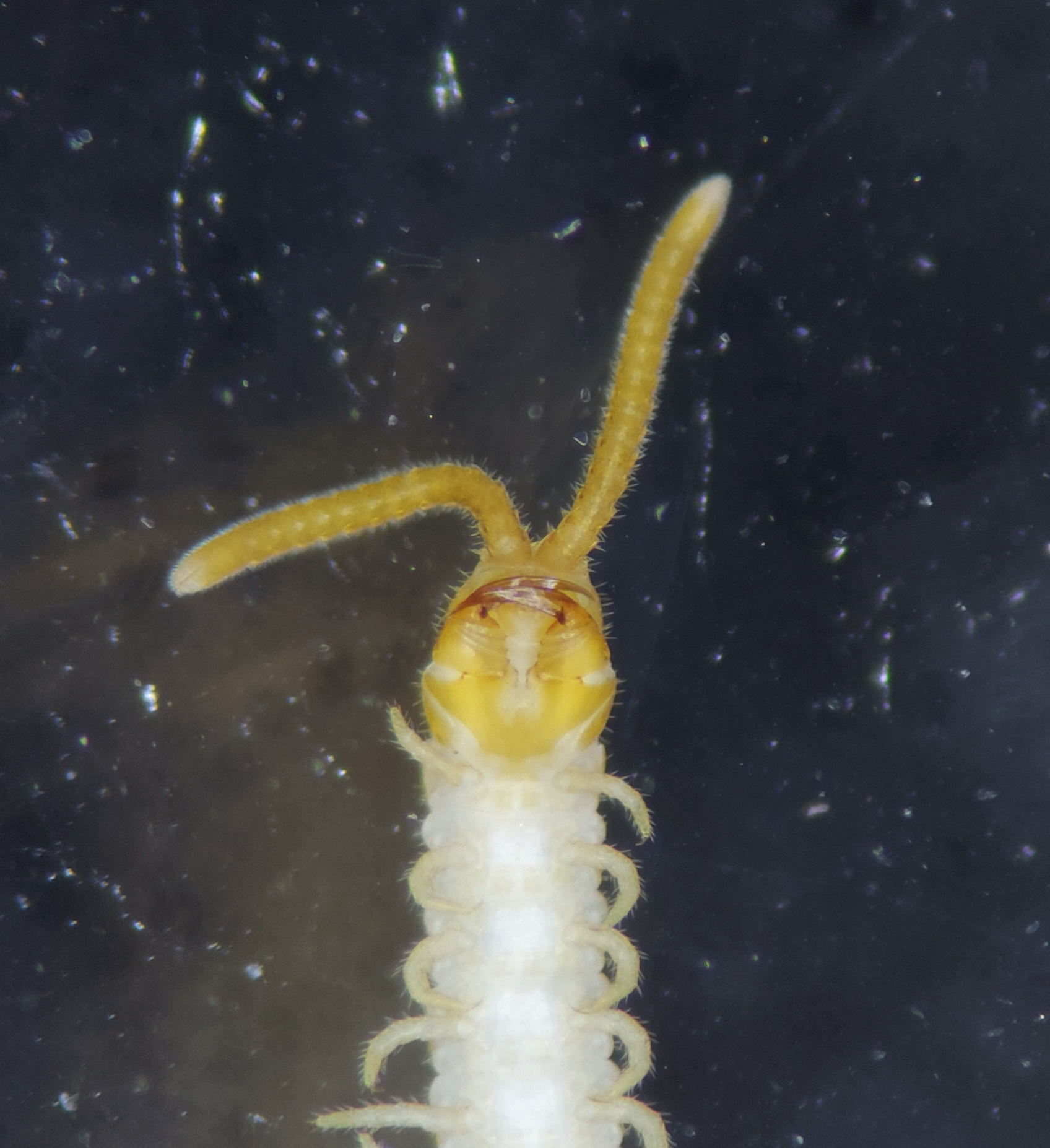
- Agathothus gracilis

Scientific classification
- Kingdom: Animalia
- Phylum: Arthropoda
- Subphylum: Myriapoda
- Class: Chilopoda
- Order: Geophilomorpha
- Suborder: Adesmata
- Family: Linotaeniidae; Cook, 1899

= Linotaeniidae =

Family of centipedes

Linotaeniidae is a monophyletic clade of soil centipedes in the family Geophilidae found mostly in the temperate regions of the Holarctic as well as the south Andes. Species in the clade Linotaeniidae are characterized by a body that usually tapers toward the anterior tip; mandibles with a single pectinate lamella; second maxillae with coxo-sternite usually undivided and claws without projections; forcipular segment short, with tergite remarkably wide, forcipules evidently tapering; coxal organs opening through distinct pores on the ventral surface of the coxo-pleura. The number of legs in this clade varies within as well as among species and ranges from as few as 31 pairs of legs (in Strigamia hoffmani) to as many as 83 leg pairs (in S. epileptica, Agathothus gracilis, and Diplochora imperialis). Compared to most families in the suborder Adesmata, this clade features a modest number of leg-bearing segments and limited variation in this number within each species.

== Genera ==
- Agathothus
- Chileana
- Diplochora
- Strigamia
