= Aphilodon bahianus =

Scientific classification
- Kingdom: Animalia
- Phylum: Arthropoda
- Subphylum: Myriapoda
- Class: Chilopoda
- Order: Geophilomorpha
- Family: Geophilidae
- Genus: Aphilodon
- Species: A. bahianus

Binomial name
- Aphilodon bahianus Calvanese & Brescovit, 2022

Species of centipede

Aphilodon bahianus, the Bahian aphilodon, is a species of soil centipede in the subfamily Aphilodontinae, a clade formerly known as the family Aphilodontidae but now deemed a subfamily within the family Geophilidae. This centipede can reach 21 mm in length and can have either 63 or 65 pairs of legs. This species is found in Brazil.

== Discovery ==
This species was first described in 2022 by the biologists Victor C. Calvanese and Antonio D. Brescovit. The original description of this species is based on 22 specimens (12 females and 10 males), including a female holotype and four paratypes (two females and two males). These specimens were collected in 2018 from four different localites, all in the state of Bahia in northeastern Brazil, the place the species was named after. The type specimens are deposited in the Instituto Butantan in São Paulo, Brazil.

== Etymology ==
The genus name Aphilodon comes from Ancient Greek ἀ- (a-), meaning "-less," φίλος (phílos), meaning "loving," and ὀδούς (odoús), meaning "tooth." The specific epithet bahianus refers to Bahia, the state in Brazil where the species was discovered.

== Distribution and habitats ==
This centipede is the first species of the genus Aphilodon found in the state of Bahia in Brazil. The original description of this species is based on specimens found in four relatively distant municipalities in the state of Bahia, suggesting a broad range for this species: Nine specimens including the type specimens were collected from the Parque Nacional do Descobrimento in Prado, ten specimens from the Reserva Biológica de Una in Una, two specimens from the Parque Municipal de Mucugê in Mucugê, and one specimen from the Parque Nacional da Chapada da Diamantina in Andaraí. This wide geographic distribution includes not only the Atlantic Forest but also the Caatinga biome and transition areas. Specimens were found just below rotten logs or about 5 cm to 10 cm below the surface, either in large forests or in small forest fragments in open areas.

== Description ==
This species can have 63 or 65 pairs of legs in each sex and ranges from 16 mm to 21 mm in length. When preserved in alcohol, the body is yellowish, with the head and forcipular segment a reddish brown. The dorsal plate on the head is longer than wide, with a length/width ratio of about 1.1. This cephalic plate features scattered short setae but lacks a visible transverse suture. The antennae are about 2.9 times longer than the cephalic plate. The sclerite in front of the forcipular tergite is exposed rather than covered by the cephalic plate. Each forcipule features only three articles. The first article of the forcipule features two denticles and the second article features one denticle, with all three denticles large and well developed, but the ultimate article lacks a distinct denticle. The ultimate article of the forcipule is distinctly curved and shorter than the first article. The basal element of each of the ultimate legs features six to nine scattered pores. Each ultimate leg features a well developed terminal spine. Males have thicker ultimate legs than females.

Like other species in the subfamily Aphilodontinae, this species features forcipules with only three articles and sternites without ventral pores, and like other species in the genus Aphilodon, this species features a terminal spine on each of the ultimate legs. This species especially resembles A. foraminis, another Brazilian species in the same genus, insofar as both species feature an unusual absence of a distinct denticle on the ultimate article of the forcipule. Furthermore, A. foraminis features two denticles on the first article of the forcipule and one denticle on the second article, all relatively large, as in A. bahianus, as well as a similar number of pores (five to eight) scattered on the basal element of each of the ultimate legs.

The species A. bahianus can be distinguished from A. foraminis, however, based on other traits. For example, the cephalic plate is wider than long and features a transverse suture in A. foraminis but is longer than wide and lacks such a suture in A. bahianus. Furthermore, the ultimate article of the forcipule is shorter than the first article and curved in A. bahianus but longer than the first article and not curved in A. foraminis. Moreover, the terminal spine at the end of each ultimate leg is small in A. foraminis but well developed in A. bahianus. Specimens of A. foraminis are also smaller than those of A. bahianus, ranging from 11 mm to 15 mm in length, and feature fewer leg pairs, with only 39 or 41 in males and 41 or 43 in females.

The species A. bahianus resembles A. acutus, another species in the same genus, in terms of both size and number of legs: A. acutus ranges from 18 mm to 22 mm in length and features 63 or 65 leg pairs in females and 61 or 63 leg pairs in males. Furthermore, in both species, the cephalic plate is longer than wide and lacks a transverse suture, and the ultimate article of the forcipule is shorter than the first article.

Other characteristics, however, distinguish A. bahianus from A. acutus. In particular, the ultimate article of the forcipule features a large sharp denticle in A. acutus but features no distinct denticle in A. bahianus. Furthermore, the sternite of the second maxillae is distinctly shorter in the middle in A. acutus but not in A. bahianus.
