= Jucuruçu =

Municipality in Bahia, Brazil

- Municipality
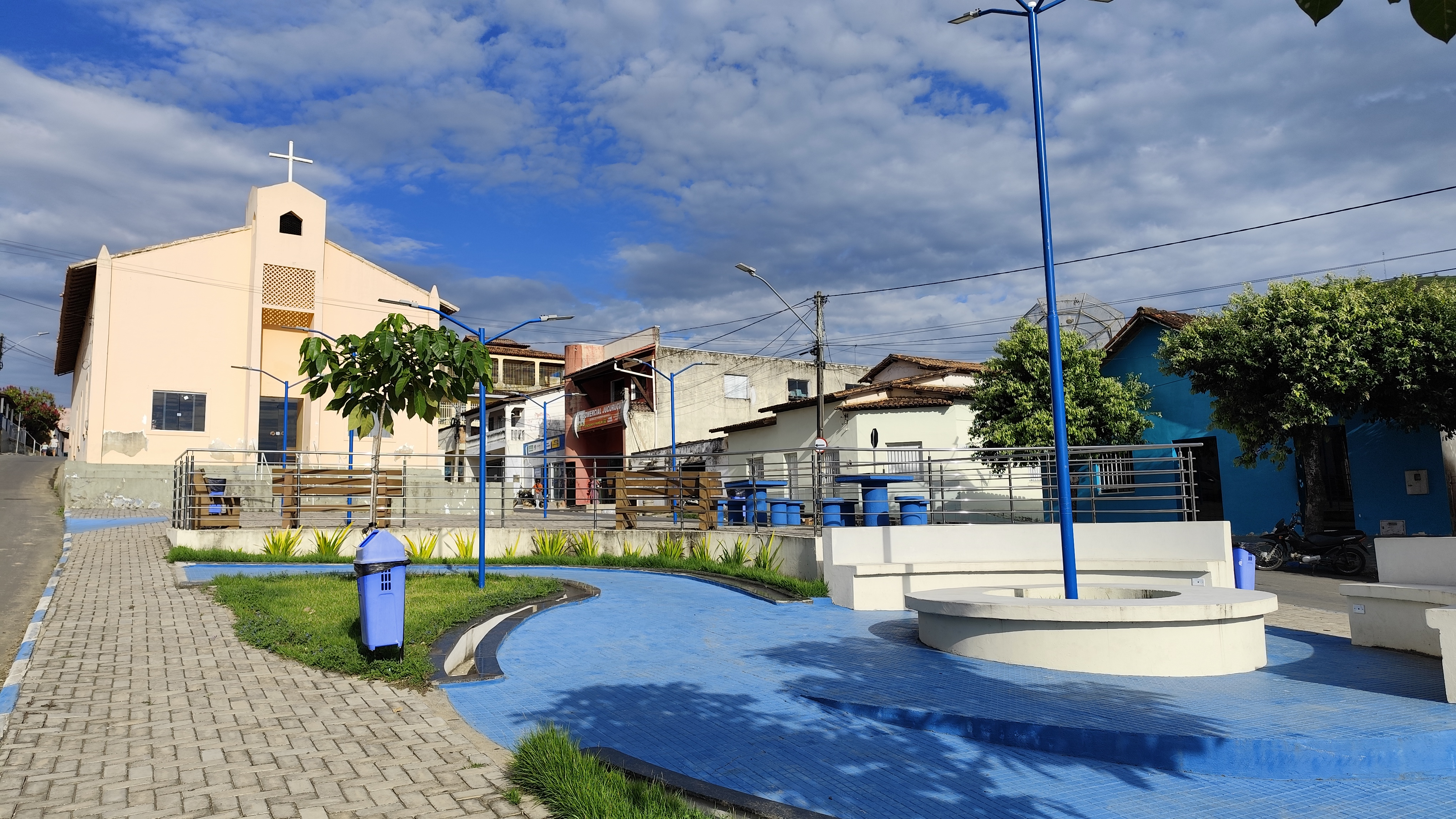
- View of Jucuruçu

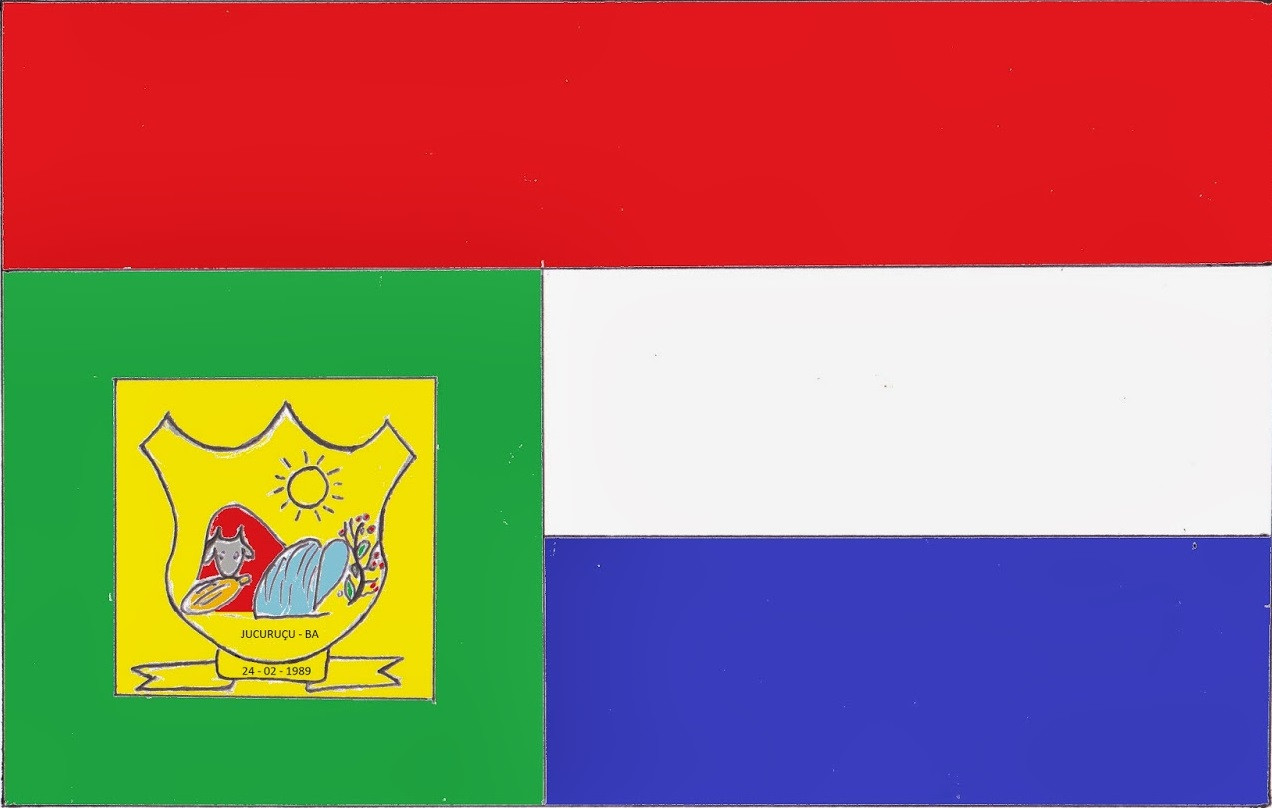
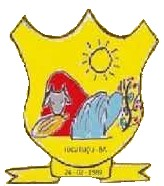
- Flag Coat of arms

- Location in Brazil
- Coordinates: 16°50′34″S 40°09′32″W
- Country: Brazil
- Region: Northeast
- State: Bahia
- Founded: 24 February 1989

Government
  - Mayor: Arivaldo de Almeida Costa (PSDB)

Area
  - Total: 1,438.463 km^{2} (555.394 sq mi)
- Elevation: 365 m (1,198 ft)

Population (2024)
  - Total: 9,944
- Time zone: UTC−3 (BRT)
- HDI (2010): 0.541 – low
- Website: jucurucu.ba.io.org.br

Jucuruçu is a municipality in the southern part of the state of Bahia in the Northeast region of Brazil. It covers an area of approximately 1,438 square kilometres (555 sq mi) and had an estimated population of 9,944 in 2024. The municipality is located about 833 kilometres (518 mi) from the state capital, Salvador, and borders the municipalities of Guaratinga, Itamaraju, Vereda, and Palmópolis (in Minas Gerais).

== Etymology ==
The name Jucuruçu derives from the Tupi language, combining jucuru (snake) and uçu (big), meaning "big snake". The name was given by indigenous people because the curves of the Jucuruçu River give the impression of a large serpent. According to local legend, such a snake once existed and, after being killed by indigenous people, transformed into the river.

== History ==
=== Early settlement ===
The settlement that became Jucuruçu originated with the arrival of the Rocha and Rodrigues families, who fled severe drought in the semi-arid interior of Bahia in the early twentieth century. Around 1912, the families established themselves along the banks of the Jucuruçu River, attracted by fertile land, abundant water, and conditions suitable for farming and raising livestock. The river valley had long served as an indigenous trail connecting tribes in northern Minas Gerais to those in the far south of Bahia. To unite the two families, intermarriages took place between the Rodrigues men and the Rocha women.

In 1933, a state decree established the community of Santo Antônio as a district of the municipality of Prado, on land donated by Manoel Rodrigues from his family's Fazenda Venezuela. By 1938, the district had been renamed Trindade, after the name of its first commercial street, though locally it became known as Chumbo ("lead") after a bag of lead was found in a nearby stream as the settlement was being established. In 1943, a further decree renamed the district Jucururu, with the spelling inadvertently deviating from the correct indigenous form.

=== Transfer to Itamaraju and emancipation ===
On 10 May 1961, the district was detached from Prado and transferred to the newly created municipality of Itamaraju. In December 1968, the Jucuruçu River experienced its first major flood. During the following decades, the community grew and local representatives advocated for autonomy. On 8 August 1988, a plebiscite was held in which residents voted in favour of emancipation. On 24 February 1989, more than seventy years after the first families arrived, the district was elevated to the status of a municipality with the corrected spelling Jucuruçu. Its territory encompassed the districts of Coqueiro, Monte Azul, Água Limpa, São João da Boa Nova, Manoel Rodrigues, and Itamaraty, as well as approximately thirty rural communities. The first municipal elections were held in 1989, with Porfírio Antônio Rodrigues elected as the inaugural mayor.

=== Recent history ===
In December 2021, the municipality was struck by severe flooding of the Jucuruçu River, surpassing the 1968 event. Approximately 25 percent of the population, around 1,500 people, were left homeless. Residents used improvised flotation devices, including inflatable mattresses, to rescue neighbours from submerged homes, and the disaster drew national media attention.

== Municipal anthem ==
The official municipal anthem of Jucuruçu was first publicly performed on 24 February 2008, the municipality's anniversary. It was adopted through a 2007 municipal law following a public competition that attracted 33 entries. A judging panel selected five finalists, which were then voted on by the municipal legislature; the winning text was by municipal employee Hildeberto Gomes Onofre.

== See also ==
- List of municipalities in Bahia
