= Corumbau Marine Extractive Reserve =

Marine extractive reserve in Bahia, Brazil

- Reserva Extrativista Marinha do Corumbau
- IUCN category VI (protected area with sustainable use of natural resources)
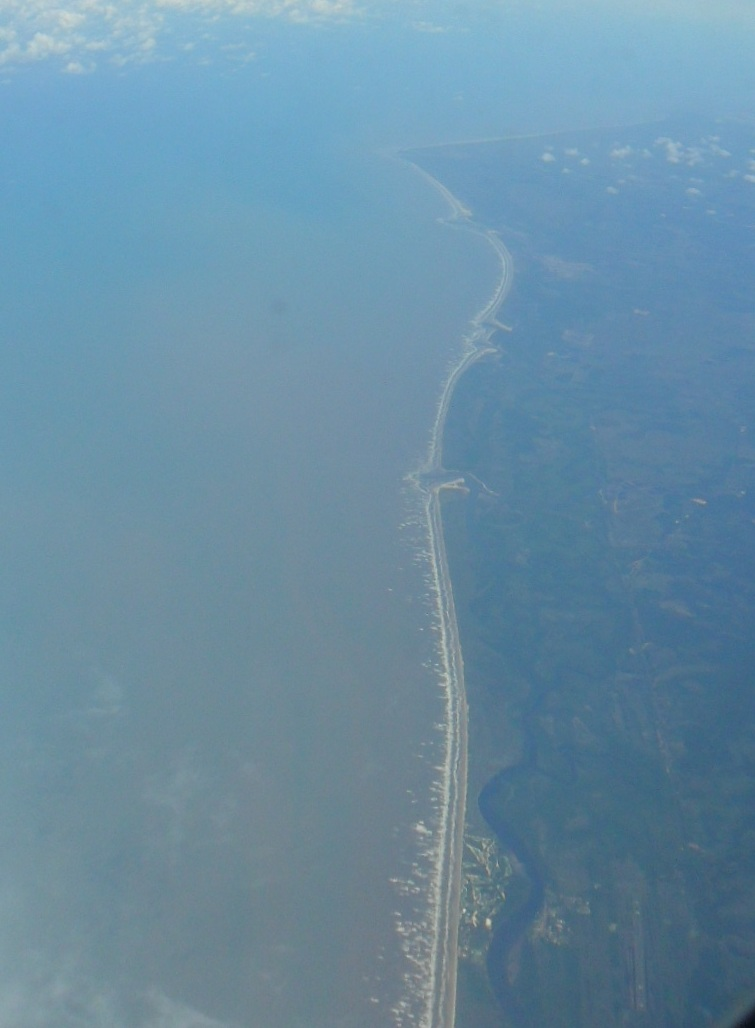
- Ponta do Corumbau

- Location within Brazil
- Nearest city: Itamaraju, Bahia
- Coordinates: 16.984°S 39.108°W
- Area: 89,596.75 hectares (221,398.4 acres)
- Designation: Extractive reserve
- Created: 21 September 2000
- Administrator: Chico Mendes Institute for Biodiversity Conservation

Corumbau Marine Extractive Reserve (Portuguese: Reserva Extrativista Marinha do Corumbau) is a coastal marine extractive reserve in the state of Bahia, Brazil. The reserve was created in 2000 to help protect the traditional local fishing economy, which was suffering from predatory commercial fisheries. It includes an area of corals and rich marine biodiversity, and a breeding ground for humpback whales. Growth in tourism has caused a surge in real estate prices and introduced new social problems among the traditional residents.

== Location ==
The Corumbau Marine Extractive Reserve covers an area of 89,596.75 hectares (221,398.4 acres). It is an area of shoreline and sea off the coasts of the municipalities of Porto Seguro and Prado, Bahia. It consists of a belt of sea eight nautical miles wide along about 65 kilometres (40 mi) of coastline that extends from the Praia das Ostras in the south to the Praia do Espelho in the north. The reserve also includes mangroves in good condition at the mouths of the Caraíva, Corumbau and Cahy rivers. It is offshore from the Monte Pascoal and Descobrimento national parks.

== Administration ==
The Corumbau Marine Extractive Reserve was created through mobilisation of the traditional community of fishing people in response to declining stocks. They were suffering from predatory industrial fisheries. It was established by federal decree on 21 September 2000 and is administered by the Chico Mendes Institute for Biodiversity Conservation. It became part of the Central Atlantic Forest Ecological Corridor, created in 2002. It is classed as IUCN protected area category VI (protected area with sustainable use of natural resources). An extractive reserve is an area used by traditional extractive populations whose livelihood is based on extraction, subsistence agriculture and small-scale animal raising. Its basic objectives are to protect the livelihoods and culture of these people and to ensure sustainable use of natural resources. A deliberative council was established on 21 September 2002.

== Environment ==
The conservation unit is the Abrolhos region, which contains reefs that support the highest marine biodiversity in the South Atlantic. The reefs include endemic species such as Mussismilia braziliensis, Favia leptophylla, Olindagorgia gracilis, Plexaurella regia and Muricea flammea, and support marine organisms such as molluscs and crustaceans. Protected species in the reserve include the Néon Elacatinus figaro, Coral-de-fogo Millepora alcicornis and Gorgônia Phyllogorgia dilatata.

The region is the main breeding ground for humpback whales (Megaptera novaeangliae) between July and October. Sea turtles feed in the area, and the loggerhead sea turtle (Caretta caretta) lays its eggs on beaches in the region. In 2002 the Ministry of the Environment (MMA) classified the region as an area of Extreme Biological Importance for the conservation of coastal and marine biodiversity of Brazil.

== Economy ==
The reserve holds areas where fish and shrimp are caught, of vital economic importance to the local communities. It is used by the communities of Curuípe, Caraíva, Barra Velha Indigenous Village, Corumbau, Veleiro, Barra do Cahy, Imbassuaba, Cumuruxatiba and Japara. The Pataxó ethnic group is an important element of the traditional population using the reserve. An ordinance of 9 December 2011 recognised the extractive reserve supported about 450 families of fishers. Their isolated villages, accessed via unpaved roads and precarious bridges, have no electricity supply. The villagers cannot store their fish, so are dependent on middlemen with greater economic power. They lack capital to buy larger vessels that would give them greater independence.

The reserve is part of the Bahia "Discovery Coast" and "Whale Coast" tourist destinations. Tourists come for whale watching expeditions that start from the communities of the reserve, especially Cumuruxatiba. The growth of tourism has created new social problems. One of the effects has been a rise in the cost of real estate in the coastal areas for construction of villas and hotels. Another is disruption of the village life by agents involved in tourism. Residents sell their homes for low prices and move to locations further from the coast. The anticipated transformation of the whole area into a Pataxó Indian Reservation also influences the decision to sell their homes.

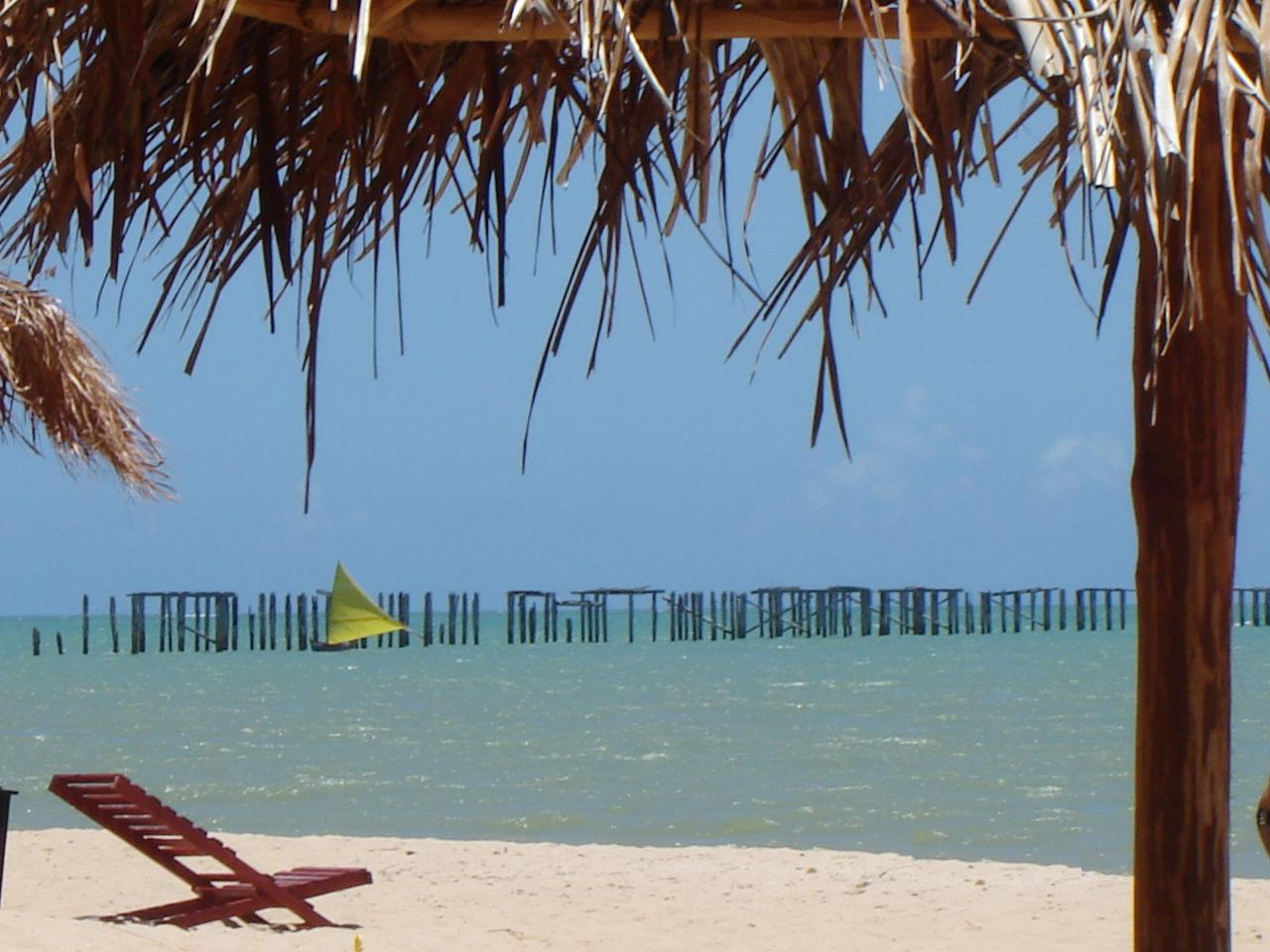
Cumuruxatiba beach

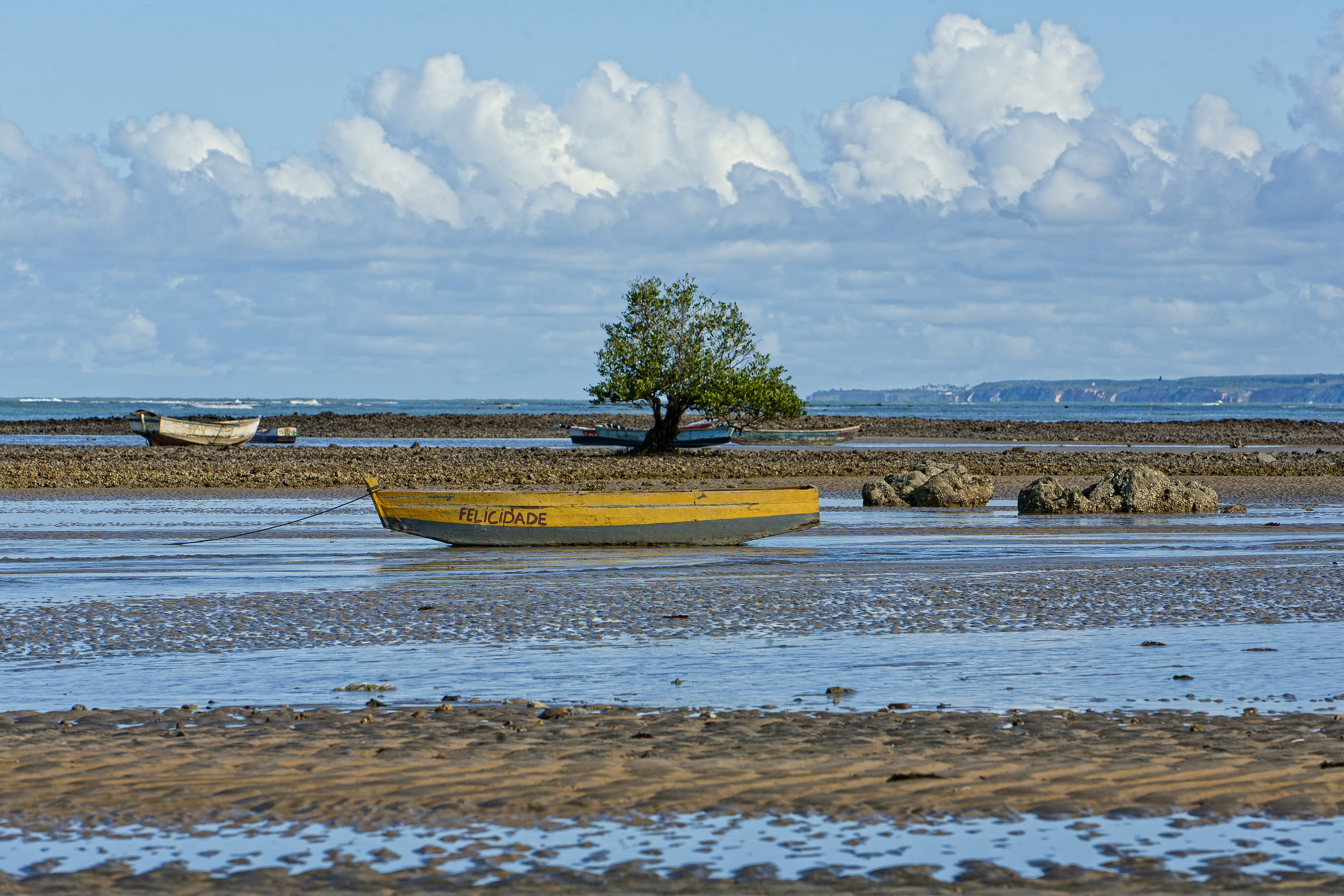
Boats and mangrove at low tide, Cumuruxatiba

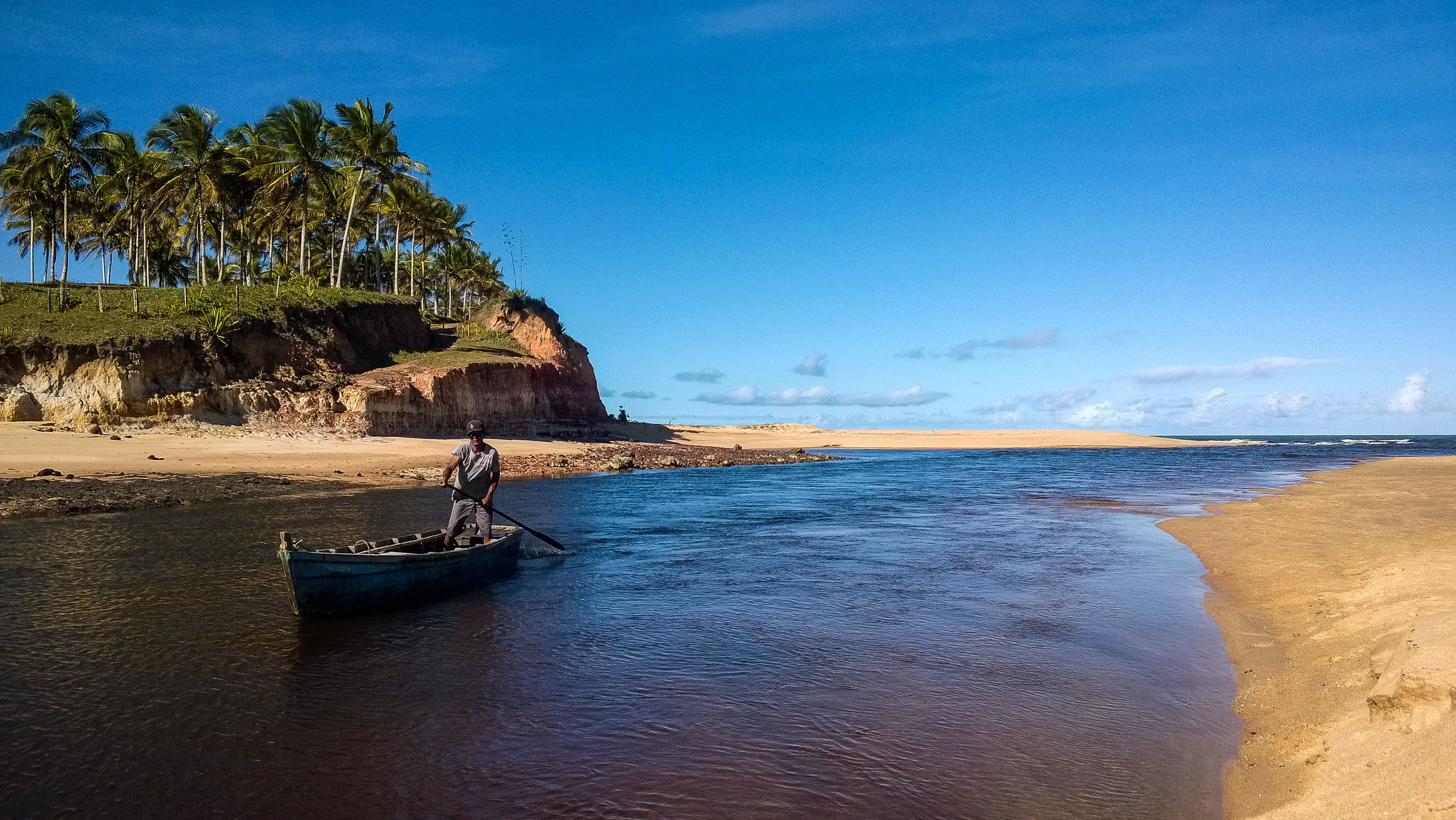
Mouth of the Cahy River

== Sources ==
- 11º aniversário da Resex Marinha do Corumbau (in Portuguese), Coral Vivo, 27 September 2011, archived from the original on 12 August 2016
- Di Ciommo, Regina Célia (2007), "Turismo, gênero e pesquisa participativa na reserva extrativista marinha do Corumbau", Caderno Virtual de Turismo (in Portuguese), 7 (2), ISSN 1677-6976
- ICMBio (11 July 2015), Reserva Extrativista Marinha de Corumbau (RESEX Corumbau) (in Portuguese), archived from the original on 20 September 2018 – via NEOTURISMO
- Lamas, Ivana Reis; Crepaldi, Maria Otávia; Mesquita, Carlos Alberto Bernardo (2015), Uma Rede no Corredor (PDF) (in Portuguese), Conservação Internacional (CI-Brasil), ISBN 978-85-98830-28-5
- Resex Marinha Corumbau (in Portuguese), Chico Mendes Institute for Biodiversity Conservation
- RESEX Marinha do Corumbau (in Portuguese), ISA: Instituto Socioambiental
- Unidade de Conservação: Reserva Extrativista Corumbau (in Portuguese), MMA: Ministério do Meio Ambiente
- Entrevista com representante da Unidade de Conservação: Reserva Extrativista Corumbau em Caraiva (in Portuguese), CARAIVA Page
