= Aphilodon =

Scientific classification
- Kingdom: Animalia
- Phylum: Arthropoda
- Subphylum: Myriapoda
- Class: Chilopoda
- Order: Geophilomorpha
- Family: Geophilidae
- Subfamily: Aphilodontinae
- Genus: Aphilodon; Silvestri, 1898

Type species
- Aphilodon spegazzinii Silvestri, 1898

Synonyms
- Brasilophilus Verhoeff, 1908; Mecistauchenus Brölemann, 1907

Genus of centipedes

Aphilodon is a genus of soil centipedes in the subfamily Aphilodontinae, a clade formerly known as the family Aphilodontidae but now deemed a subfamily within the family Geophilidae. These centipedes are found in South America. This genus includes sixteen species and is the most diverse of the Neotropical genera in the subfamily Aphilodontinae.

== Taxonomy ==
This genus was first described by the Italian zoologist Filippo Silvestri in 1898 to contain the newly discovered type species A. spegazzinii. In 1902, the French myriapodologist Henri W. Brölemann described the second species assigned to this genus, A. micronyx. In 1907, Brölemann proposed a new genus, Mecistauchenus, to contain A. micronyx as its type species. In 1908, the German zoologist Karl W. Verhoeff proposed another new genus, Brasilophilus, also to contain A. micronyx as its type species, but in 1909, Brölemann deemed Brasilophilus to be a junior synonym of Mecistauchenus.

In 2019, the biologists Victor C. Calvanese, Antonio D. Brescovit, and Lucio Bonato conducted a phylogenetic analysis of the subfamily Aphilodontinae based on morphology. This analysis placed the monotypic genus Mecistauchenus in a clade with the Neotropical species of Aphilodon, including A. spegazzinii. Calvanese, Brescovit, and Bonato concluded that both Brasilophilus and Mecistauchenus are junior synonyms of Aphilodon, thereby returning A. micronyx to the genus Aphilodon. Some authorities, however, continue to list Mecistauchenus micronyx as the valid name for this species.

This phylogenetic analysis also placed five South African species assigned to Aphilodon in a clade with the monotypic genus Philacroterium. After an examination of the type material for most of the South African species assigned to Aphilodon and a review of the original description of the other, Calvanese, Brescovit, and Bonato moved all South African species previously assigned to Aphilodon to the genus Philacroterium. Some authorities, however, continue to list these species in Aphilodon and to assign only one species to Philacroterium.

== Distribution and habitats ==
As revised by Calvanese, Brescovit, and Bonato, the genus Aphilodon contains only species found in South America. Species have been recorded in the Pampas in Argentina, the Atlantic Forest in eastern Paraguay and in southern and southeastern Brazil, and in the Pantanal in Brazil. Other Aphilodon species have been found in northeastern Brazil, in the states of Bahai and Piaui and in the Caatinga biome.

Published accounts report finding Aphilodon species in rotting wood, leaf litter, and humus. Species have also been found under the bark of fallen wood and in the first layers of soil under large stones. Other species have been found in ravines, beside streams, under logs or rocks, or near roots, from 1 cm to 10 cm below the surface, in high forests or in forest fragments in open areas.

== Description ==
The lateral parts of the labrum in this genus are thin membranes. Each telopodite of the second maxillae features three articles, with the base of the third article usually more than half as wide as the base of the second article. The sclerite in front of the forcipular tergite is shorter than one-third the length of the head. The sternites of both the forcipular segment and the first leg-bearing segment are wider than long.

Each of the ultimate legs in this genus features only six rather than seven articles, with only one tarsal article rather than two. These legs feature a small terminal spine rather than a claw at the distal end in both males and females. The ultimate legs are slender in females and only moderately thicker in males.

Centipedes in this genus range from 7 mm to 70 mm in length and can have as few as 37 or as many as 93 pairs of legs. The species A. meganae is notable for its small size (ranging from 7 mm to 8 mm in length) and modest number of legs (37 in males and 39 in females), fewer than recorded in any other Aphilodon species for each sex. The species A. modestus (measuring 9 mm in length) and A. aiuruocae (ranging from 7 mm to 10 mm in length) are also notable for their small sizes. The species A. micronyx (ranging from 30 mm to 70 mm) and A. pereirai (ranging from 20 mm to 70 mm) are both notable for their large sizes. The species A. cangaceiro is notable for its many legs, with as many as 91 pairs in males and 93 pairs in females.

== Phylogeny ==
A phylogenetic analysis of the subfamily Aphilodontinae based on morphology places the genus Aphilodon in a clade with the genus Mairata, which emerges as the most closely related genus in a phylogenetic tree. While the genus Aphilodon exhibits many traits shared by others in this subfamily, such as forcipules with only three articles and sternites without ventral pores, this genus shares a more extensive set of traits with the genus Mairata. For example, in both Aphilodon and Mairata, the ultimate legs in both sexes each feature only six articles (with only one tarsal article) and no terminal claw. Furthermore, in both Aphilodon and Mairata, the sclerite in front of the forcipular tergite is shorter than one-third the length of the head, and the sternites of both the forcipular segment and the first leg-bearing segment are wider than long.

Centipedes in the genus Aphilodon can be distinguished from those in the genus Mairata, however, based on other traits. For example, the ultimate article of the second maxillae is reduced in size in Mairata but not in Aphilodon. These two genera can also be distinguished based on features of the ultimate legs. For example, the ultimate legs end in a small terminal spine in each sex in Aphilodon, but this spine is absent in each sex in Mairata. Furthermore, the ultimate legs of the male in Aphilodon are only moderately thickened, whereas the ultimate legs of the male in Mairata are strikingly swollen, with the third, fourth, and fifth articles wider than long, and the tarsal article globose. Moreover, the tarsal article of the ultimate legs of the female broadens towards the tip in Mairata but not in Aphilodon.

== Species ==
This genus contains the following species:

- Aphilodon acutus Calvanese & Brescovit, 2022
- Aphilodon aiuruocae Calvanese & Brescovit, 2022
- Aphilodon angustatus Silvestri, 1909
- Aphilodon bahianus Calvanese & Brescovit, 2022
- Aphilodon caboclos Calvanese, Brescovit & Bonato, 2019
- Aphilodon cangaceiro Calvanese & Brescovit, 2022
- Aphilodon foraminis Calvanese & Brescovit, 2022
- Aphilodon indespectus Calvanese, Brescovit & Bonato, 2019
- Aphilodon intermedius Silvestri, 1909
- Aphilodon meganae Calvanese, Brescovit & Bonato, 2019
- Aphilodon micronyx Brölemann, 1902
- Aphilodon modestus Silvestri, 1909
- Aphilodon pereirai Calvanese, Brescovit & Bonato, 2019
- Aphilodon rectitibia Calvanese & Brescovit, 2022
- Aphilodon silvestrii Calvanese, Brescovit & Bonato, 2019
- Aphilodon spegazzinii Silvestri, 1898
