= Mecophilus tupiniquim =

Scientific classification
- Kingdom: Animalia
- Phylum: Arthropoda
- Subphylum: Myriapoda
- Class: Chilopoda
- Order: Geophilomorpha
- Family: Geophilidae
- Genus: Mecophilus
- Species: M. tupiniquim

Binomial name
- Mecophilus tupiniquim Calvanese, Brescovit & Bonato, 2019

Species of centipede

Mecophilus tupiniquim is a species of soil centipede in the subfamily Aphilodontinae, a clade formerly known as the family Aphilodontidae but now deemed a subfamily within the family Geophilidae. This centipede is notable for its small size (reaching only 7.5 mm in length) and modest number of legs (only 35 pairs). This species is found in Brazil.

== Discovery ==
This species was first described by the biologists Victor C. Calvanese, Antonio D. Brescovit, and Lucio Bonato in 2019. They based the original description of this species on a female holotype and four male paratypes. Calvanese collected all five specimens from Morro do Cruzeiro in São Roque in the state of São Paulo in Brazil in 2017. The type specimens are deposited in the Instituto Butantan in São Paulo, Brazil.

== Etymology ==
The specific epithet tupiniquim is the name of a Brazilian indigenous people.

== Description ==
This species ranges from 7 mm to 7.5 mm in length and has only 35 pairs of legs in each sex. The antennae do not taper toward the tips, and each of the second maxillae has three articles. Both the cephalic plate (the dorsal side of the head) and the forcipular tergite are shaped like rectangles with rounded corners. The forcipular pretergite (the sclerite anterior to the main tergite of the forcipular segment) is long relative to the cephalic plate.

The distal denticle of the first article of the forcipule is close to the denticle of the second article. The forcipular coxosternite (the sclerite that corresponds to both the sternite of the forcupular segment and the sclerites at the base of the forcipules) and the sternite of the first leg-bearing segment are each longer than wide. Each of the ultimate legs in the male ends with a single tarsal article and no terminal claw or spine, but each of these legs in the female ends with two tarsal articles and a claw.

This species shares a distinctive set of traits with the other two species in the genus Mecophilus, M. carioca and M. neotropicus. For example, all three species feature an elongated first sternite as well as an elongated forcipular pretergite and an elongated forcipular coxosternite. Furthermore, in all three species, there is no terminal claw on the ultimate legs of the male.

The species M. tupiniquim may be distinguished from the other two Mecophilus species based on the denticle on the ultimate article of the forcipule. In M. tupiniquim, this denticle is at the base of the article, whereas in the species M. neotropicus, this denticle is in the middle of the article. Furthermore, this denticle is also larger in M. tupiniquim than in M. neotropicus. In M. carioca, this denticle is even smaller and less conspicuous than in M. neotropicus. Moreover, the ultimate legs of the female of M. tupiniquim features a terminal claw, whereas the female of M. carioca does not.
