= Aphilodon silvestrii =

Scientific classification
- Kingdom: Animalia
- Phylum: Arthropoda
- Subphylum: Myriapoda
- Class: Chilopoda
- Order: Geophilomorpha
- Family: Geophilidae
- Genus: Aphilodon
- Species: A. silvestrii

Binomial name
- Aphilodon silvestrii Calvanese, Brescovit & Bonato, 2019

Species of centipede

Aphilodon silvestrii, Silvestri's aphilodon, is a species of soil centipede in the subfamily Aphilodontinae, a clade formerly known as the family Aphilodontidae but now deemed a subfamily within the family Geophilidae. This centipede can have 67, 69, or 71 pairs of legs and is notable for its size, reaching 61 mm (2.4 in) in length, which is among the largest sizes recorded in the genus Aphilodon. This species is found in Brazil.

== Discovery ==
This species was first described in 2019 by the biologists Victor C. Calvanese, Antonio D. Brescovit, and Lucio Bonato. The original description of this species is based on a female holotype and ten paratypes (seven females and three males). These specimens were found in the first layers of soil, 3 to 5 cm deep, under large stones in a single locality in a park in the municipality of São Roque in the state of São Paulo in Brazil. The type specimens are deposited in the Instituto Butantan in the city of São Paulo in Brazil.

== Etymology ==
The genus name Aphilodon comes from Ancient Greek ἀ- (a-), meaning "-less," φίλος (phílos), meaning "loving," and ὀδούς (odoús), meaning "tooth." This species is named for the Italian myriapodologist Filippo Silvestri.

== Description ==
Adults of this species range from 22 mm to 61 mm in length. The male specimens have 69 pairs of legs, whereas the females have 67, 69, or 71 leg pairs. The dorsal plate on the head (cephalic plate) lacks a transverse suture. The cephalic plate is longer than wide, with a length/width ratio of about 1.3. The antennae are relatively short, only 1.3 to 1.9 times as long as the cephalic plate. The short sclerite in front of the forcipular tergite (forcipular pretergite) is exposed rather than covered by the cephalic plate. The coxosternite of the second maxillae is not shorter in the middle than on the lateral margins.

Each forcipule features only three articles, with the ultimate article about 0.9 times as long as the first article. Each forcipule features two large denticles on the first article, one large denticle on the second article, and a small denticle on the ultimate article. The first denticle is small relative to the second and third denticles, and the basal margins of the first two denticles are coalescent rather than separate.

The sternites of the leg-bearing segments lack fields of pores. A short sclerite is visible in front of the main sternite of the ultimate leg-bearing segment, and this presternite is apparently divided in the middle. The main sternite of the ultimate leg-bearing segment is wider than long, with a length/width ratio of about 0.8. The basal element of each of the ultimate legs features 23 to 35 scattered pores in adults but only five to eight pores in juveniles. Each of the ultimate legs in both sexes features only six rather than seven articles, with a single tarsal article rather than two, and ends in a spine rather than a claw. These legs are about 1.7 times as long as the penultimate legs. The ultimate legs of the male are thicker than those of the female and feature somewhat more setae.

LIke other species in the subfamily Aphilodontinae, this species features forcipules with only three articles and sternites without ventral pores, and like other species in the genus Aphilodon, this species features a terminal spine on each of the ultimate legs. This species shares an especially extensive set of distinctive traits with A. intermedius, another species in the same genus. For example, in both A. silvestrii and A. intermedius, the cephalic plate lacks a transverse suture, both the forcipular pretergite and the ultimate presternite are visible, the first article of the forcipule is longer than the ultimate article, and the main sternite of the ultimate leg-bearing segment is wider than long. Furthermore, like adults of the species A. silvestrii, the only recorded specimen of A. intermedius (an adult male) features numerous scattered pores (about 20) on each of the ultimate legs.

These two species can be distinguished, however, based on other traits. For example, A. intermedius features fewer legs, with only 57 pairs in the only known specimen, than A. silvestrii, with at least 67 leg pairs. Furthermore, each antenna tapers toward the distal end in A. silvestrii but not in A intermedius. Moreover, the first two denticles on the forcipule are separate in A. intermedius but coalescent at the basal margins in A. silvestrii.
