= Aphilodon indespectus =

Scientific classification
- Kingdom: Animalia
- Phylum: Arthropoda
- Subphylum: Myriapoda
- Class: Chilopoda
- Order: Geophilomorpha
- Family: Geophilidae
- Genus: Aphilodon
- Species: A. indespectus

Binomial name
- Aphilodon indespectus Calvanese, Brescovit & Bonato, 2019

Species of centipede

Aphilodon indespectus, the invisible aphilodon, is a species of soil centipede in the subfamily Aphilodontinae, a clade formerly known as the family Aphilodontidae but now deemed a subfamily within the family Geophilidae. This species can reach 20 mm in length and features 39 pairs of legs in males and 41 leg pairs in females. This centipede is found in Brazil.

== Discovery ==
This species was first described in 2019 by the biologists Victor C. Calvanese, Antonio D. Brescovit, and Lucio Bonato. The original description of this species is based on an examination of fourteen specimens, including a female holotype, seven paratypes (four males and three females), and six other specimens (three males and three females). The type specimens were found in 2014 in a park in the municipality of São Roque in the state of São Paulo in Brazil; the other specimens were found in 2010 in the municipality of Bananal in the same state. All fourteen specimens are deposited in the Instituto Butantan in the city of São Paulo in Brazil.

== Etymology ==
The genus name Aphilodon comes from Ancient Greek ἀ- (a-), meaning "-less," φίλος (phílos), meaning "loving," and ὀδούς (odoús), meaning "tooth." The specific epithet indespectus comes from Latin in-, meaning "not," and despectus, meaning "looking down upon," a reference to how difficult it is to find this centipede in the field.

== Description ==
Adults of this species range from 10 mm to 20 mm in length. The male specimens have 39 pairs of legs, whereas the females have 41 leg pairs. The dorsal plate on the head (cephalic plate) lacks a transverse suture. The cephalic plate is longer than wide, with a length/width ratio of about 1.1. The antennae are about twice as long as the cephalic plate. The short sclerite in front of the forcipular tergite (forcipular pretergite) is exposed rather than covered by the cephalic plate. The coxosternite of the second maxillae is not shorter in the middle than on the lateral margins. The second article of the second maxillae is longer than the third article.

Each forcipule features only three articles, with the ultimate article about 0.7 times as long as the first article. Each forcipule features four vestigial denticles (three small denticles on the first two articles and a very short denticle on the ultimate article). The sternites of the leg-bearing segments lack fields of pores, and all pleurites are small and well separated. A short sclerite is visible in front of the lateral margins of the main sternite of the ultimate leg-bearing segment, and this presternite is apparently divided in the middle. The main sternite of the ultimate leg-bearing segment is wider than long, with a length/width ratio of about 0.5. The basal element of each of the ultimate legs features 10 to 15 scattered pores in adults. Each of the ultimate legs in both sexes features only six rather than seven articles, with a single tarsal article rather than two, and ends in a spine rather than a claw. These legs are about 1.8 times as long as the penultimate legs.

Like other species in the subfamily Aphilodontinae, this species features forcipules with only three articles and sternites without ventral pores, and like other species in the genus Aphilodon, this species features a terminal spine on each of the ultimate legs. This species especially resembles A. micronyx, another species in the same genus, insofar as the forcipule in each species features four vestigial denticles and a first article that is longer than the ultimate article. Both of these species can be found in the state of São Paulo in Brazil.

These two species are notably different, however, in other respects. For example, A. micronyx is much larger (ranging from 30 mm to 70 mm in length) and features many more legs (from 57 to 61 pairs) and many more pores on each of the ultimate legs (27 to 34) than A. indespectus. Furthermore, the coxosternite of the second maxillae is distinctly shorter in the middle than on the lateral margins in A. micronyx but not in A. indespectus.
