= Mairata itatiaiensis =

Scientific classification
- Kingdom: Animalia
- Phylum: Arthropoda
- Subphylum: Myriapoda
- Class: Chilopoda
- Order: Geophilomorpha
- Family: Geophilidae
- Genus: Mairata
- Species: M. itatiaiensis

Binomial name
- Mairata itatiaiensis Calvanese, Brescovit & Bonato, 2019

Species of centipede

Mairata itatiaiensis is a species of soil centipede in the subfamily Aphilodontinae, a clade formerly known as the family Aphilodontidae but now deemed a subfamily within the family Geophilidae. This centipede can reach 41 mm in length and can have either 61 or 63 pairs of legs. This species is found in the Atlantic Forest of southeastern Brazil.

== Discovery ==
This species was first described in 2019 by the biologists Victor C. Calvanese, Antonio D. Brescovit, and Lucio Bonato. The original description of this species is based on eleven specimens (seven females and four males), including a female holotype and four paratypes (two females and two males), all collected in 2017 from Itatiaia National Park, in Itatiai in the state of Rio de Janeiro in Brazil. The species M. itatiaiensis is named for its type locality. These specimens were found below or near roots and rocks in the first layer of soil at humid sites in the forest. The type specimens are deposited in the Instituto Butantan in São Paulo, Brazil.

== Description ==
The female of this species features 63 pairs of legs, whereas the male features 61 leg pairs. Adults range from 22 mm to 41 mm in length. The antennae are about 2.3 times as long as the head. The short sclerite in front of the forcipular tergite is ten times wider than long. The forcipules extend beyond the front margin of the head. The first article of the forcipule features a distal denticle without any apical setae. The basal element of the ultimate legs features 16 to 20 small pores in the female but only 10 to 12 pores in the male. The ultimate legs of the female are slightly thicker than the penultimate legs.

A phylogenetic analysis of the subfamily Aphildontinae based on morphology places M. itatiaiensis in a clade with M. butantan, the only other species in the same genus. These two closely related species share a set of traits that distinguish this genus from other genera in the same subfamily. For example, each telopodite of the second maxillae in both species features three articles, with the third article reduced in size: The base of the third article is less than half as wide as the base of the second article. The short sclerite in front of the forcipular tergite is much shorter than wide and shorter than one-third the length of the head. The sternites of both the forcipular segment and the first leg-bearing segment are wider than long.

Furthermore, in both species, each of the ultimate legs of both males and females features only six rather than seven articles, with only one tarsal article rather than two, and with neither a terminal spine nor a claw at the distal end. The ultimate leg is swollen in the male, with the third, fourth, and fifth articles wider than long, and the ultimate (tarsal) article shaped like a globe. The ultimate leg in the female is more slender, but the tarsal article is distinctly wider at the distal end.

The species M. itatiaiensis can be distinguished from the species M. butantan, however, based on other traits. For example, adults of the species M. butantan are generally smaller, ranging from 18 mm to 23 mm in length. Furthermore, M. butantan features fewer legs, with only 59 pairs in the female and 57 pairs in the male. Moreover, the distal denticle on the first article of the forcipule features an apical seta in M. butantan, but this seta is absent in M. itatiaiensis.

These two species can also be distinguished based on features of the ultimate legs. For example, in females of the species M. butantan, these legs are as slender as the penultimate legs, but in females of the species M. itatiaiensis, these legs are thicker than the penultimate legs. Furthermore, the basal element of each of the ultimate legs features two to eight large pores near the corresponding sternite in adults of the species M. butantan but 10 to 20 pores in adults of the species M. itatiaiensis.
