= Aphilodon pereirai =

Scientific classification
- Kingdom: Animalia
- Phylum: Arthropoda
- Subphylum: Myriapoda
- Class: Chilopoda
- Order: Geophilomorpha
- Family: Geophilidae
- Genus: Aphilodon
- Species: A. pereirai

Binomial name
- Aphilodon pereirai Calvanese, Brescovit & Bonato, 2019

Species of centipede

Aphilodon pereirai, Pereira's aphilodon, is a species of soil centipedes in the subfamily Aphilodontinae, a clade formerly known as the family Aphilodontidae but now deemed a subfamily within the family Geophilidae. This centipede can have 73, 75, or 77 pairs of legs and is notable for its size, reaching 71 mm in length, the largest size recorded in the genus Aphilodon. This species is found in Brazil.

== Discovery ==
This species was first described in 2019 by the biologists Victor C. Calvanese, Antonio D. Brescovit, and Lucio Bonato. The original description of this species is based on 23 specimens (sixteen females and seven males), including a female holotype and four paratypes (two females and two males), all collected in 2015. These specimens were found in the first layers of soil, 3 to 5 cm deep, under large stones in a single locality in the state of Minas Gerais in Brazil. The type specimens are deposited in the Instituto Butantan in the city of São Paulo in Brazil.

== Etymology ==
The genus name Aphilodon comes from Ancient Greek ἀ- (a-), meaning "-less," φίλος (phílos), meaning "loving," and ὀδούς (odoús), meaning "tooth." This species is named for the Argentinian myriapodologist Luis Alberto Pereira.

== Description ==
Adults of this species range from 23 mm to 71 mm in length. The males can have either 73 or 75 pairs of legs, whereas the females can have 73, 75, or 77 leg pairs. The dorsal plate on the head (cephalic plate) lacks a transverse suture. The cephalic plate is longer than wide, with a length/width ratio ranging from 1.3 to 1.4. The antennae range from 2.0 to 2.7 times as long as the cephalic plate. The short sclerite in front of the forcipular tergite (forcipular pretergite) is exposed rather than covered by the cephalic plate.

Each of the mandibles features a pectinate lamella with narrow curved denticles. The coxosternite of the second maxillae is not shorter in the middle than on the lateral margins. Each forcipule features only three articles, with the ultimate article about 0.9 times as long as the first article. Each forcipule features two large denticles on the first article, one large denticle on the second article, and a small denticle on the ultimate article.

The sternites of the leg-bearing segments lack fields of pores. No short sclerite is visible in front of the main sternite of the ultimate leg-bearing segment, and this presternite is apparently absent. The main sternite of the ultimate leg-bearing segment is wider than long, with a length/width ratio ranging from 0.7 to 0.8. The basal element of each of the ultimate legs features 22 to 44 scattered pores in adults. Each of the ultimate legs in both sexes features only six rather than seven articles, with a single tarsal article rather than two, and ends in a spine rather than a claw. These legs are about 1.5 times as long as the penultimate legs.

LIke other species in the subfamily Aphilodontinae, this species features forcipules with only three articles and sternites without ventral pores, and like other species in the genus Aphilodon, this species features a terminal spine on each of the ultimate legs. This species especially resembles A. acutus, another Brazilian species in the same genus, insofar as there is no presternite evident on the ultimate leg-bearing segment in either of these two species. Furthermore, in both of these species, the cephalic plate is longer than wide and lacks a transverse suture, the forcipular pretergite is exposed, the first article of the forcipule is longer than the ultimate article, and the sternite of the ultimate leg-bearing segment is wider than long.

These two species can be distinguished, however, based on other traits. For example, the coxosternite of the second maxillae is distinctly shorter in the middle in A. acutus but not in A. pereirai. Furthermore, the denticle on the ultimate article of the forcipule is sharp and strikingly large in A. acutus but small in A. pereirai. Moreover, A. acutus features fewer legs (no more than 65 pairs) and fewer pores on each of the ultimate legs (only eight to twelve) than recorded in A. pereirai.
