= Mecophilus =

Scientific classification
- Kingdom: Animalia
- Phylum: Arthropoda
- Subphylum: Myriapoda
- Class: Chilopoda
- Order: Geophilomorpha
- Family: Geophilidae
- Subfamily: Aphilodontinae
- Genus: Mecophilus; Silvestri, 1909

Type species
- Mecophilus neotropicus Silvestri, 1909

Species
- Mecophilus carioca; Mecophilus neotropicus; Mecophilus tupiniquim

Genus of centipedes

Mecophilus is a genus of soil centipedes in the subfamily Aphilodontinae, a clade formerly known as the family Aphilodontidae but now deemed a subfamily within the family Geophilidae. The species in this genus are among the smallest centipedes in the order Geophilomorpha, reaching only 8 mm in length. This genus is also notable for featuring the fewest legs (only 33 or 35 pairs) in the subfamily Aphilodontinae. The species in this genus are found in the Atlantic Forest in south and southeastern Brazil.

== Discovery ==
This genus was created by the Italian entomologist Filippo Silvestri in 1909 to contain the newly discovered type species M. neotropicus. This species is known only from the holotype, found in Foz do Iguaçu in the state of Paraná in Brazil. Although Silvestri described this holotype as a female, this specimen has since proved to be a male upon examination. The holotype is deposited in the Museo Civico di Storia Naturale Giacomo Doria in Genova, Italy.

In 2019, the biologists Victor C. Calvanese, Antonio D. Brescovit, and Lucio Bonato described the second species in this genus to be discovered, M. tupiniquim. They based their description of this species on a female holotype and four male paratypes. Calvanese collected all five specimens from Morro do Cruzeiro in São Roque in the state of São Paulo in Brazil in 2017. The type specimens are deposited in the Instituto Butantan in São Paulo, Brazil. The name of this species is an adjective that means "originating in Brazil" in the Tupi-Guarani language.

In 2022, Calvanese and Brescovit described the third species in this genus to be discovered, M. carioca. They based their description of this species on two males and two females, including a female holotype. All four specimens were found in Parque Nacional de Itatiaia in Itatiaia in the state of Rio de Janeiro in Brazil. The holotype and two paratypes for this species are deposited in the Instituto Butantan. The name of this species means "house of the white man" in the Tupi language and is a tribute to the city of Rio de Janeiro; the local indigenous people used this term to refer to the city and its residents.

== Description ==
All three species are notable for their small sizes. The holotype of the type species M. neotropicus measures only 8 mm in length. The specimens of M. tupiniquim are even smaller, ranging from 7 mm to 7.5 mm in length. Finally, M. carioca is the smallest species in this genus, with specimens ranging from only 6.5 mm to 7 mm in length.

All three species also have notably few legs. All specimens in this genus have only 35 pairs of legs, except for one male specimen of M. carioca that has only 33 leg pairs, the minimum number recorded in the subfamily Aphilodontinae. Outside of the genus Mecophilus, no species in this subfamily features 35 or fewer leg pairs.

The species in this genus feature an elongated first sternite as well as an elongate forcipular pretergite (the sclerite anterior to the main tergite of the forcipular segment) and an elongate forcipular coxosternite (the sclerite that corresponds to both the sternite of the forcupular segment and the sclerites at the base of the forcipules). In all three species in this genus, there is no terminal claw on the ultimate legs of the male. The female of the species M. tupiniquim does feature this terminal claw, but the female of the species M. carioca does not, while females of the species M. neotropicus remain unknown.

The three species in this genus may be distinguished from one another based on the denticle on the ultimate article of the forcipule. In M. neotropicus, this denticle is in the middle of the article, whereas in the other two species, the denticle is at the base of the article. Furthermore, in M. carioca, this denticle is small, whereas in the other two species, the denticle is conspicuous. This denticle is also larger in M. tupiniquim than in M. neotropicus.
