= Aphilodon meganae =

Scientific classification
- Kingdom: Animalia
- Phylum: Arthropoda
- Subphylum: Myriapoda
- Class: Chilopoda
- Order: Geophilomorpha
- Family: Geophilidae
- Genus: Aphilodon
- Species: A. meganae

Binomial name
- Aphilodon meganae Calvanese, Brescovit & Bonato, 2019

Species of centipede

Aphilodon meganae, Megan's aphilodon, is a species of soil centipede in the subfamily Aphilodontinae, a clade formerly known as the family Aphilodontidae but now deemed a subfamily within the family Geophilidae. This centipede features only 37 pairs of legs in males and 39 leg pairs in females. No other species of Aphilodon features so few legs in either sex. This species is also notable for its small size, ranging from 7 mm to 8 mm in length, the minimum size recorded in the genus Aphilodon. This centipede is found in Brazil.

== Discovery ==
This species was first described in 2019 by the biologists Victor C. Calvanese, Antonio D. Brescovit, and Lucio Bonato. The original description of this species is based on an examination of eight specimens, including a female holotype, six paratypes (four females and two males), and a third male specimen. The type specimens were found in 2016 in the municipality of Iporanga in the state of São Paulo in Brazil; the other specimen was found in 2015 in a park in the municipality of São Roque in the same state. All eight specimens are deposited in the Instituto Butantan in the city of São Paulo in Brazil.

== Etymology ==
The genus name Aphilodon comes from Ancient Greek ἀ- (a-), meaning '-less,' φίλος (phílos), meaning 'loving,' and ὀδούς (odoús), meaning 'tooth.' The species is named for the myriapodologist Adele Megan Silva, who collected most of the type specimens.

== Description ==
Adults of this species range from 7 mm to 8 mm in length. The male specimens have 37 pairs of legs, whereas the females have 39 leg pairs. The dorsal plate on the head (cephalic plate) lacks a transverse suture. The cephalic plate is longer than wide, with a length/width ratio of about 1.2. The antennae are about twice as long as the cephalic plate. The short sclerite in front of the forcipular tergite (forcipular pretergite) is covered by the cephalic plate rather than exposed. The coxosternite of the second maxillae is not shorter in the middle than on the lateral margins. The third article of the second maxillae is longer than the second article.

Each forcipule features only three articles, with the ultimate article about 0.9 times as long as the first article. Each forcipule features two large denticles on the first article, one large denticle on the second article, and a small denticle on the ultimate article. The posterior part of the lateral margin of the forcipule is slightly concave.

The sternites of the leg-bearing segments lack fields of pores. A short sclerite is visible in front of the lateral margins of the main sternite of the ultimate leg-bearing segment, and this presternite is apparently divided in the middle. The main sternite of the ultimate leg-bearing segment is wider than long, with a length/width ratio of about 0.7. The basal element of each of the ultimate legs features seven to ten scattered pores in adults. Each of the ultimate legs in both sexes features only six rather than seven articles, with a single tarsal article rather than two, and ends in a spine rather than a claw. These legs are about 2.5 times as long as the penultimate legs.

Like other species in the subfamily Aphilodontinae, this species features forcipules with only three articles and sternites without ventral pores, and like other species in the genus Aphilodon, this species features a terminal spine on each of the ultimate legs. This species especially resembles A. aiuruocae, another Brazilian species in the same genus, insofar as each species is exceptionally small and features three large denticles on the first two articles of each forcipule. The species A. aiuruocae is notable for its small size, ranging from 7 mm to 10 mm in length.

These two species can be distinguished, however, based on other traits. For example, the forcipular pretergite is covered by the cephalic plate in A. meganae but exposed in all other species of Aphilodon, including A. aiuruocae. Furthermore, although the basal element of the ultimate legs features a similar number of pores in A. aiuruocae (five to ten), these pores are all grouped close to the adjacent sternite in A. aiuruocae rather than scattered as in A. meganae. Moreover, although both species feature few legs, A. aiuruocae features more leg pairs (41 in males, 41 or 43 in females) than A. meganae.
