= Geoperingueyia =

Scientific classification
- Kingdom: Animalia
- Phylum: Arthropoda
- Subphylum: Myriapoda
- Class: Chilopoda
- Order: Geophilomorpha
- Family: Geophilidae
- Genus: Geoperingueyia; Attems, 1926

Type species
- Geoperingueyia conjungens Attems, 1928

Genus of centipedes

Geoperingueyia is a genus of soil centipedes in the family Geophildae. These centipedes are found in southern Africa and Argentina. This genus contains ten species, including the type species G. conjungens.

== Description ==
Centipedes in this genus feature a short head, with a dorsal plate that is about as long as it is wide. The coxosternite of the first maxillae is not divided down the middle. The telopodites of the first maxillae each feature two articles. The second maxillae are small, and each features three articles with a small spine rather than a claw at the distal end. The forcipules are too short to reach the front edge of the head. Each forcipule features four articles.

The ventral surface of the trunk features dense fields of pores. The basal element of each of the ultimate legs features numerous pores that open separately. Each of the ultimate legs features only six articles rather than seven, with only one tarsal article rather than two. The ultimate legs in the male are thicker than in the female.

Centipedes in this genus can have as few as 41 or as many as 85 pairs of legs. The African species G. platypoda is notable for its small size, reaching only 21.5 mm in length, and its modest number of legs, with only 41 pairs in the male holotype, the minimum number recorded in this genus. The African species G. armata is notable for its large size, reaching 56 mm in length, and for its many legs, with 85 pairs in the male type specimen, the maximum number recorded in this genus. The African species G. conjugens is also notable for its large size, reaching 53 mm in length.

== Phylogeny ==
Phylogenetic analysis based on morphology places this genus in a clade with the subfamily Aphilodontinae. This subfamily emerges as the sister group for this genus in a phylogenetic tree of the family Geophilidae. Like the genus Geoperingueyia, this subfamily has a disjunct distribution that includes areas in both South America and southern Africa.

This genus shares many distinctive traits with its close relatives in Aphilodontinae. For example, in both of these groups, the labrum lacks a distinct separation between the middle and lateral parts, the second maxillae lack claws and are reduced in size relative to the first maxillae, and the two articles before the ultimate article of the forcipules each feature a denticle with setae near the apex as well as at the base. Furthermore, the ultimate legs of the male in both groups features only six articles, with a single tarsal article.

Species of Geoperingueyia can be distinguished from their close relatives in Aphilodontinae, however, based on other traits. For example, in the subfamily Aphilodontinae, the forcipules feature only three articles rather than four, the lateral parts of the labrum are either inconspicuous thin membranes or apparently missing, and ventral pore-fields are absent. Furthermore, the intermediate part of the clypeus in the subfamily Aphilodontinae feature two paired groups of setae in addition to the post-antennal and lateral groups, but these "sub-clypeal" setae are absent in the genus Geoperingueyia.

== Species ==
This genus contains the following species:

- Geoperingueyia affinis Verhoeff, 1938
- Geoperingueyia agnatha Verhoeff, 1940
- Geoperingueyia armata Verhoeff, 1938
- Geoperingueyia attemsi Lawrence, 1955
- Geoperingueyia conjungens Attems, 1928
- Geoperingueyia crabilli Pereira, 1981
- Geoperingueyia dentata Verhoeff, 1938
- Geoperingueyia grandidens Lawrence, 1963
- Geoperingueyia minor Verhoeff, 1940
- Geoperingueyia platypoda Lawrence, 1963
