= Geoperingueyia crabilli =

Scientific classification
- Kingdom: Animalia
- Phylum: Arthropoda
- Subphylum: Myriapoda
- Class: Chilopoda
- Order: Geophilomorpha
- Family: Geophilidae
- Genus: Geoperingueyia
- Species: G. crabilli

Binomial name
- Geoperingueyia crabilli Pereira, 1981

Species of centipede

Geoperingueyia crabilli is a species of soil centipede in the family Geophildae. This centipede is found in Argentina and is notable as the only species in the genus Geoperingueyia discovered in South America. All other described species in this genus are found in southern Africa. This species can reach 45 mm in length and can have 71, 73, or 75 pairs of legs.

== Discovery ==
This species was first described in 1981 by the Argentine myriapodologist Luis A. Pereira. He based the original description of this species on a female holotype, a male allotype, and eight paratypes (seven females and one juvenile). These type specimens were found in the town of General Juan Madariaga in Buenos Aires Province in Argentina. The holotype, the allotype, and six paratypes are deposited in the Museo de La Plata in La Plata in Argentina, one paratype is deposited in the National Museum of Natural History of the Smithsonian Institution in Washington, and one paratype is deposited in the Muséum d'Histoire Naturelle in París. This species is named in honor of the American myriapodologist Ralph E. Crabill, Jr., of the National Museum on Natural History of the Smithsonian Institution.

== Description ==
The female holotype measures 45 mm in length, whereas the male allotype measures only 26 mm in length. The male allotype has 71 pairs of legs, whereas the females have 71, 73, or 75 leg pairs: Half of the female type specimens have 73 pairs, most of the other females have 71 pairs, and only one female paratype has 75 pairs. The body and antennae are yellow, but the head, forcipular segment, and ventral surface of the 13th through the 20th leg-bearing segments are the color of ocher.

The dorsal plate on the head lacks a frontal groove. The antennae are about 2.8 times as long as the cephalic plate. The short sclerite in front of the forcipular tergite is barely visible. The labrum is completely devoid of teeth. Each mandible features a lamella with 27 simple narrow hyaline teeth set closely in a row. The coxosternite of the first maxillae lacks a groove down the middle. Each telopodite of the first maxillae features two articles. The coxosternite of the second maxillae lacks a suture down the middle. Each of the second maxillae features three articles with a long seta rather than a claw at the distal end.

The coxosternite of the forcipular segment lacks chitinous lines. When closed, the forcipules do not reach the front of the cephalic plate. The first article of the forcipule is wider than long. The second and the third articles of the forcipule each feature a denticle on the inner surface. The ultimate article of the forcipule features a long curved claw but lacks a denticle.

The ventral surface of the first through the penultimate leg-bearing segments features fields of pores. The tergite of the ultimate leg-bearing segment is shaped like a trapezoid with the anterior base wider than the tergite length. The sternite of the ultimate leg-bearing segment is about as wide as long, with convex lateral margins and a concave posterior margin. The basal element of each of the ultimate legs features about 40 pores divided into an anterior group and a posterior group. The posterior group is partly hidden by the main sternite of the ultimate leg-bearing segment, while the anterior group is partly hidden by this sternite and the anterior sclerite (presternite). Each of the ultimate legs features six articles and ends in a claw that is well developed in the female but smaller in the male.

This species shares many traits with other species in the same genus. For example, like other Geoperingueyia species, this species features first maxillae with two articles on each telopodite and a coxosternite undivided by a groove in the middle, second maxillae with three articles and an apical spine rather than a terminal claw on each telopodite, four articles on each forcipule, and forcipules that are too short to reach the front of the head. Furthermore, as in other species in the same genus, this species features ventral pore-fields on the trunk, and each of the ultimate legs features numerous pores and six articles.

This species can be distinguished from its close relatives in the genus Geoperingueyia, however, based on other traits. For example, the pores on each of the ultimate legs of this species are gathered into two groups close to the adjacent sternite. In all other species in this genus, these pores are instead scattered over the entire ventral surface of the basal element of each of the ultimate legs.
