= Mairata =

Scientific classification
- Kingdom: Animalia
- Phylum: Arthropoda
- Subphylum: Myriapoda
- Class: Chilopoda
- Order: Geophilomorpha
- Family: Geophilidae
- Subfamily: Aphilodontinae
- Genus: Mairata; Calvanese, Brescovit & Bonato, 2019

Type species
- Mairata butantan Calvanese, Brescovit & Bonato, 2019

Species
- Mairata butantan; Mairata itatiaiensis

Genus of centipedes

Mairata is a genus of soil centipedes in the subfamily Aphilodontinae, a clade formerly known as the family Aphilodontidae but now deemed a subfamily within the family Geophilidae. This genus contains only two species: M. itatiaiensis and the type species M. butantan. Both species are found in the Atlantic Forest of southeastern Brazil.

== Discovery ==
This genus and its two species were first described in 2019 by the biologists Victor C. Calvanese, Antonio D. Brescovit, and Lucio Bonato. The original description of M. butantan is based on eleven specimens (six females and five males), including a female holotype and four paratypes (two females and two males). These specimens were collected from two localities in the state of São Paulo in Brazil: São Roque, where the type specimens were found, and Cotia. The original description of M. itatiaiensis is based on eleven specimens (seven females and four males), including a female holotype and four paratypes (two females and two males), all collected from Itatiaia National Park, in Itatiai in the state of Rio de Janeiro in Brazil. The specimens of both species were found below or near roots and rocks in the first layer of soil at humid sites. The type specimens for both species are deposited in the Instituto Butantan in São Paulo, Brazil.

== Etymology ==
The genus Mairata is named for a mythological entity of the ancient Tupi-Guarani indigenous people of Brazil. The species M. butantan is named for the Butantan Institute in recognition of its promotion of biological research. The species M. itatiaiensis is named for its type locality.

== Description ==
The lateral parts of the labrum in this genus are thin membranes. Each of the telopodites of the second maxillae features three articles, with the third article reduced in size: The base of the third article is less than half as wide as the base of the second article. The short sclerite in front of the forcipular tergite is much shorter than wide and shorter than one-third the length of the head. The sternites of both the forcipular segment and the first leg-bearing segment are wider than long.

Each of the ultimate legs of both males and females in this genus features only six rather than seven articles, with only one tarsal article rather than two, and with neither a terminal spine nor a claw at the distal end. The ultimate leg is swollen in the male, with the third, fourth, and fifth articles wider than long, and the ultimate (tarsal) article shaped like a globe. The ultimate leg in the female is more slender, but the tarsal article is distinctly wider at the distal end.

Whereas adults of the species M. butantan range from 18 mm to 23 mm in length, the adults of the species M. itatiaiensis are generally larger, ranging from 22 mm to 41 mm in length. Furthermore, the species M. itatiaiensis features more pairs of legs, with 63 in the female and 61 in the male. The species M. butantan features fewer leg pairs, with 59 in the female and 57 in the male.

These two species can also be distinguished based on features of the ultimate legs. For example, in females of the species M. butantan, these legs are as slender as the penultimate legs, but in females of the species M. itatiaiensis, these legs are thicker than the penultimate legs. Furthermore, the basal element of each of the ultimate legs features 10 to 20 pores in adults of the species M. itatiaiensis but only two to eight pores in adults of the species M. butantan.

== Phylogeny ==
A phylogenetic analysis of the subfamily Aphilodontinae based on morphology places the genus Mairata in a clade with the genus Aphilodon, which emerges as the most closely related genus in a phylogenetic tree. While the genus Mairata exhibits many traits shared by others in this subfamily, such as forcipules with only three articles and sternites without ventral pores, this genus shares a more extensive set of traits with the genus Aphilodon. For example, in both Mairata and Aphilodon, the ultimate legs in both sexes each feature only six articles (with only one tarsal article) and no terminal claw. Furthermore, in both Mairata and Aphilodon, the sclerite in front of the forcipular tergite is shorter than one-third the length of the head, and the sternites of both the forcipular segment and the first leg-bearing segment are wider than long.

Centipedes in the genus Mairata can be distinguished from those in the genus Aphilodon, however, based on other traits. For example, the ultimate article of the second maxillae is reduced in size in Mairata but not in Aphilodon. These two genera can also be distinguished based on features of the ultimate legs. For example, each of the ultimate legs ends in a small terminal spine in both sexes in Aphilodon, but this spine is absent in both sexes in Mairata. Furthermore, the ultimate legs of the male in Aphilodon are only moderately thickened, whereas the ultimate legs of the male in Mairata are strikingly swollen, with the third, fourth, and fifth articles wider than long, and the tarsal article globose. Moreover, the tarsal article of the ultimate legs of the female broadens towards the tip in Mairata but not in Aphilodon.
