= Itamaraju =

Municipality of Bahia, Brazil

Coordinates: 17°04′S 39°32′W

- Municipality
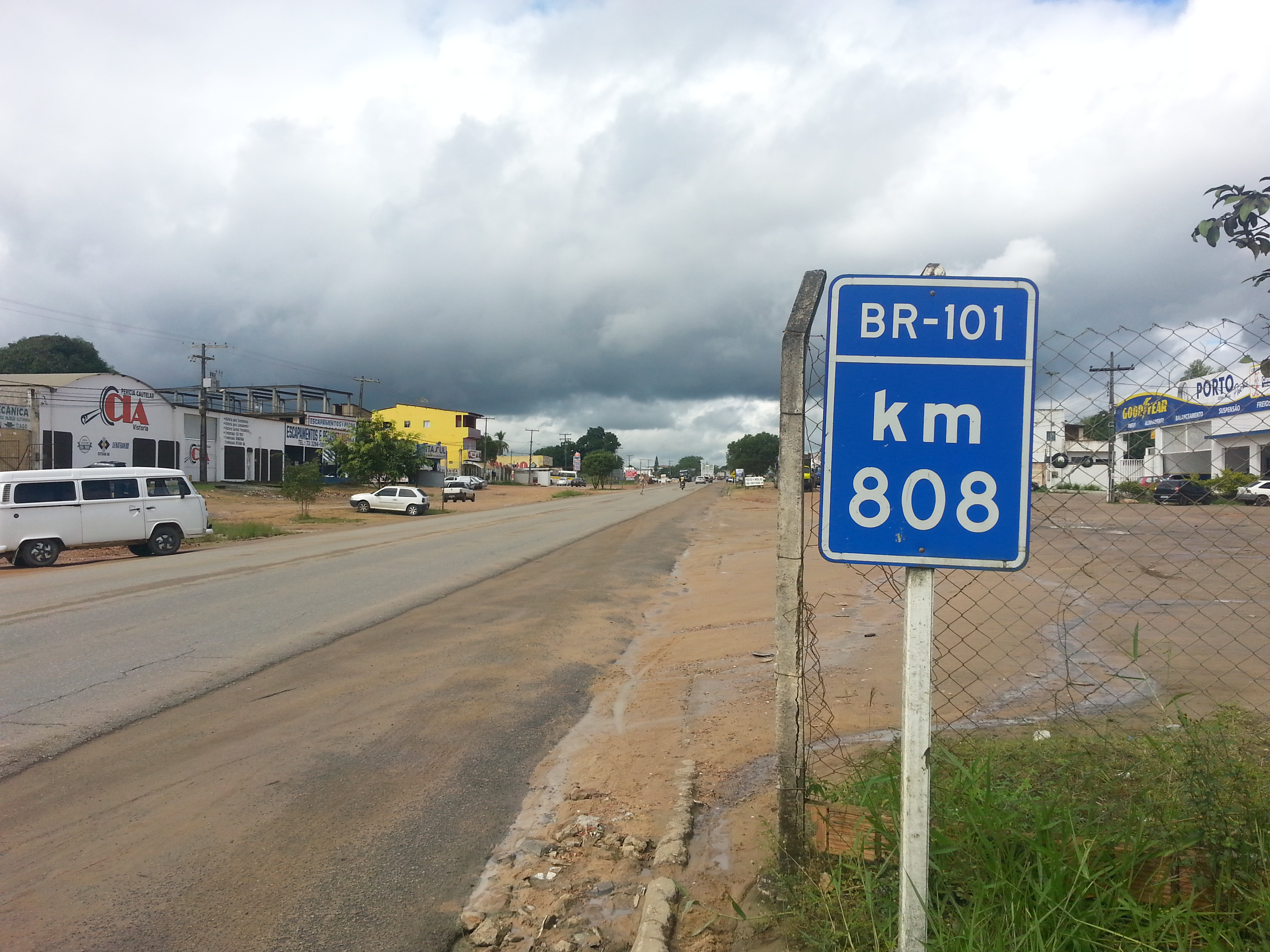

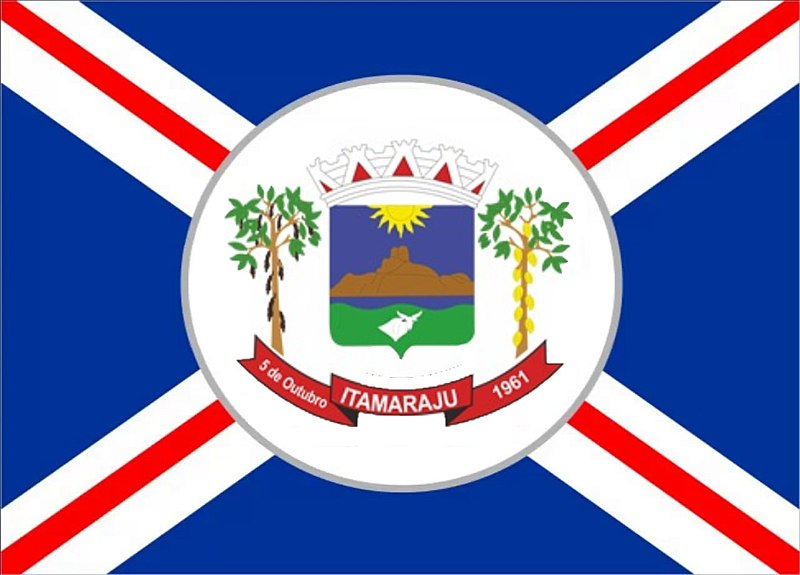
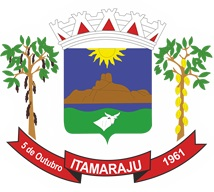
- Flag Coat of arms
- Interactive map of Itamaraju
- Country: Brazil
- Region: Nordeste
- State: Bahia

Government

Population (2020)
  - Total: 64,455
- Time zone: UTC−3 (BRT)

Itamaraju is a municipality in the state of Bahia in the North-East region of Brazil. "Itamaraju" is a word from the Tupi language meaning "rock of the trees of Jucuruçu" from the terms itá (rock), mara (woods), and ju (first syllable of the Jucuruçu River).

== History ==
On 22 April 1500 a Portuguese fleet under the command of the explorer Pedro Álvares Cabral, seen by many as the first European to arrive in Brazil, recorded their sighting of Monte Pascoal which became a European settlement and, subsequently, the municipality of Prado. Itamaraju became and until 1961 remained a piece of the territory of Prado. On 5 October 1961 Itamaraju formally obtained municipal autonomy, its separation from Prado led by José Gomes de Almeida and Antônio Fontes Mascarenhas.

== See also ==
- List of municipalities in Bahia
