= Descobrimento National Park =

National park in Bahia, Brazil

- Parque Nacional do Descobrimento
- IUCN category II (national park)
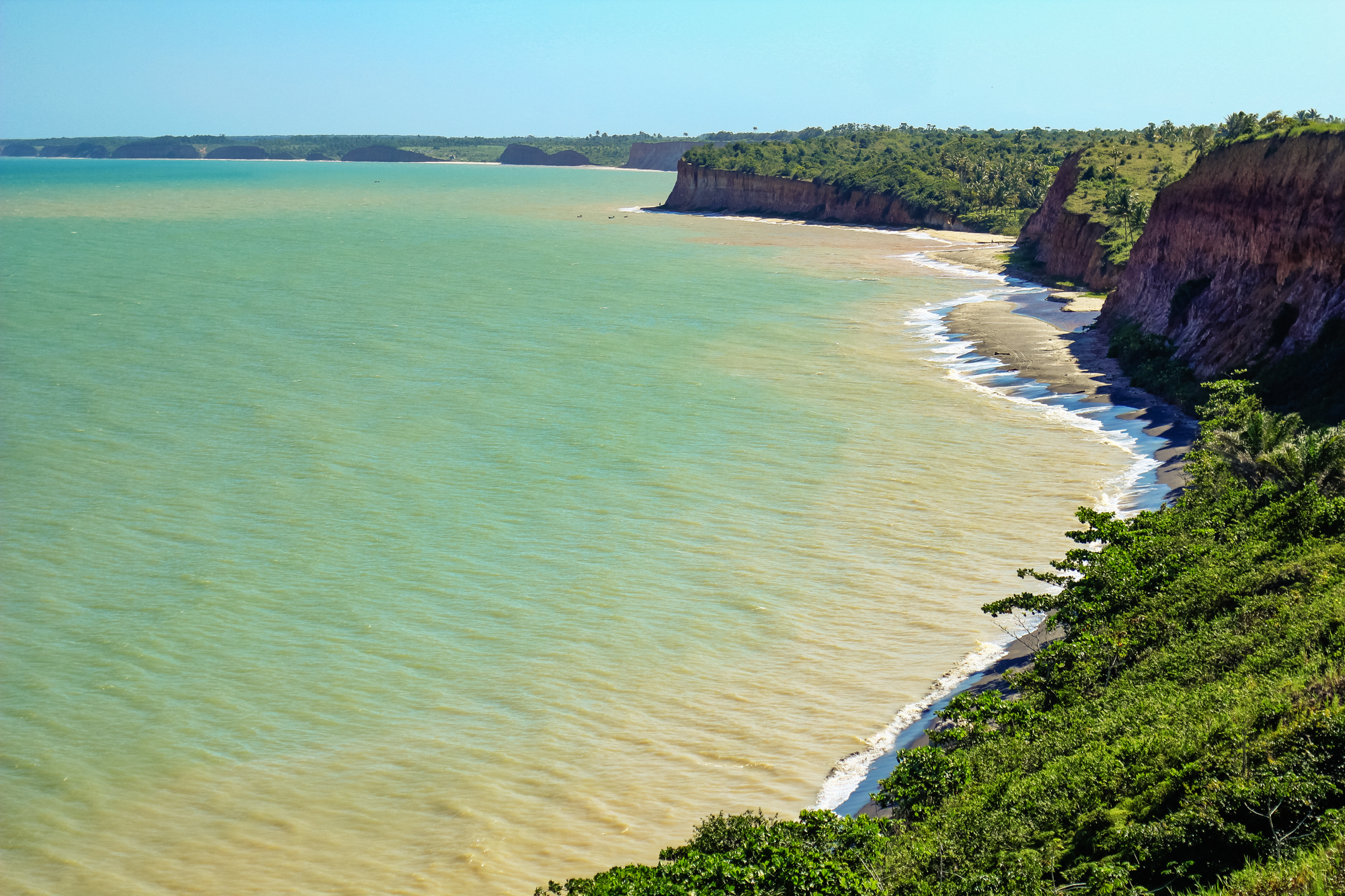
- Discovery coast

- Location within Brazil
- Nearest city: Cumuruxatiba, Prado, Bahia
- Coordinates: 17.069233°S 39.293317°W
- Area: 22,693.97 hectares (56,078.0 acres)
- Designation: National park
- Created: 20 April 1999
- Administrator: Chico Mendes Institute for Biodiversity Conservation

The Descobrimento National Park (Portuguese: Parque Nacional do Descobrimento) is a national park in the state of Bahia, Brazil.

== Location ==
The Descobrimento National Park is in the municipality of Prado, Bahia. It has an area of 22,693.97 hectares (56,078.0 acres). It contains the Discovery Coast World Natural Heritage Site, a Biosphere Reserve.

== Environment ==
The Descobrimento National Park is in the Atlantic Forest biome. It holds an important fragment of Atlantic Forest of the northeast plateau of Brazil, and the most important wildlife refuge of the south of Bahia. Protected species in the park include the cougar (Puma concolor), the characid fish Mimagoniates sylvicola and the bird species ringed woodpecker (Celeus torquatus), black-headed berryeater (Carpornis melanocephala), red-billed curassow (Crax blumenbachii), banded cotinga (Cotinga maculata), band-tailed antwren (Myrmotherula urosticta), ochre-marked parakeet (Pyrrhura cruentata) and striated softtail (Thripophaga macroura).

== Administration ==
The Descobrimento National Park was created by federal decree of 20 April 1999 with an area of 21,129 hectares (52,210 acres) and expanded to an area of 22,693 hectares (56,080 acres) on 6 June 2012. It became part of the Central Atlantic Forest Ecological Corridor, created in 2002. It is administered by the Chico Mendes Institute for Biodiversity Conservation (ICMBio). The consultative council was established on 1 February 2008, and the management plan was approved on 26 December 2014. The park is classed as IUCN protected area category II (national park). The objective is to preserve a natural ecosystem of great ecological relevance and scenic beauty, and to support scientific research, environmental education and interpretation, outdoors recreation and ecotourism.

== Sources ==
- Lamas, Ivana Reis; Crepaldi, Maria Otávia; Mesquita, Carlos Alberto Bernardo (2015), Uma Rede no Corredor (PDF) (in Portuguese), Conservação Internacional (CI-Brasil), ISBN 978-85-98830-28-5
- Parna do Descobrimento (in Portuguese), Chico Mendes Institute for Biodiversity Conservation, archived from the original on 2019-04-24
- PARNA do Descobrimento (in Portuguese), ISA: Instituto Socioambiental
- Unidade de Conservação: Parque Nacional do Descobrimento (in Portuguese), MMA: Ministério do Meio Ambiente
