= Prado, Bahia =

Municipality of Bahia, Brazil

Coordinates: 17°20′27″S 39°13′15″W

Prado
- Municipality
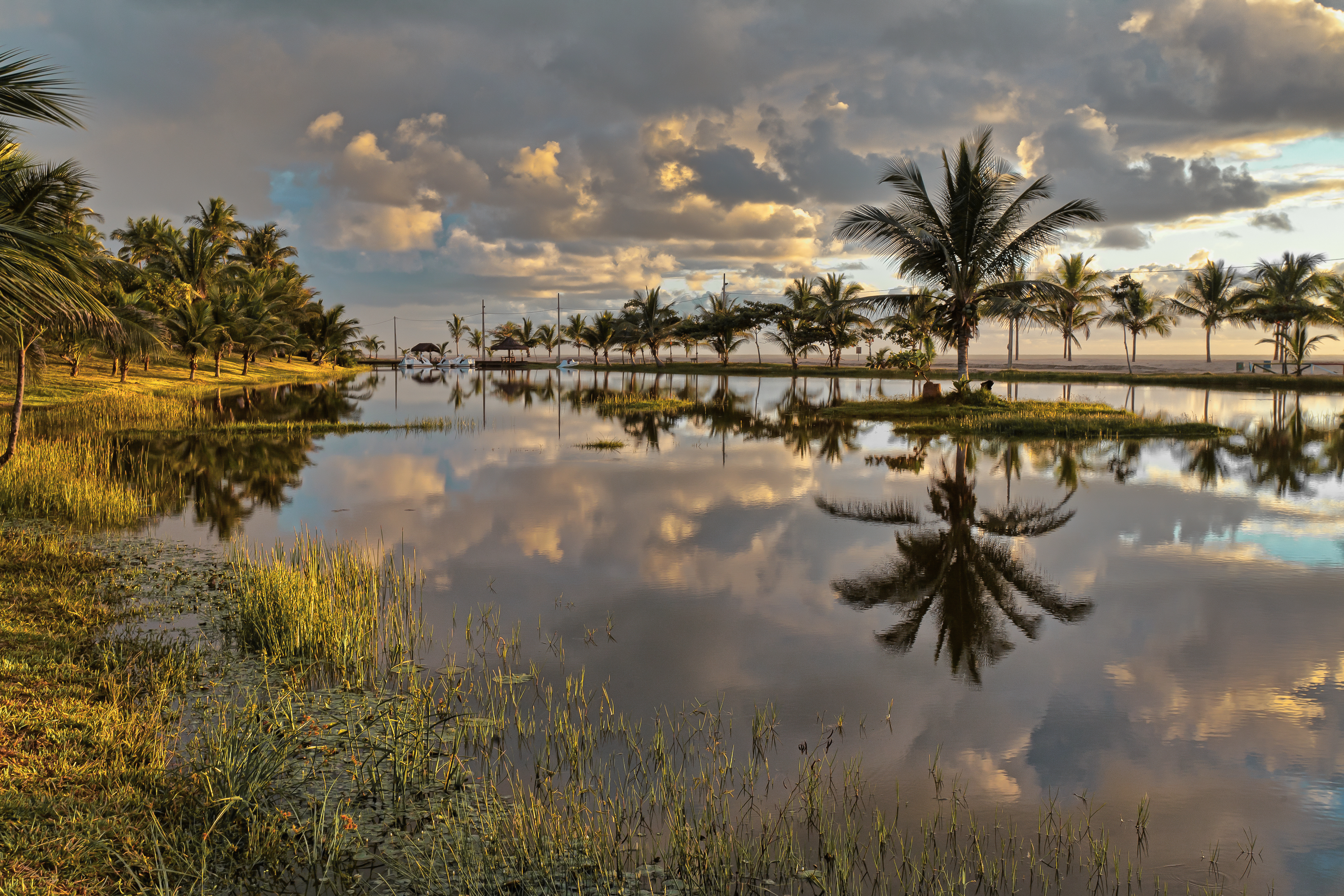
- Prado at dawn, on the coast.

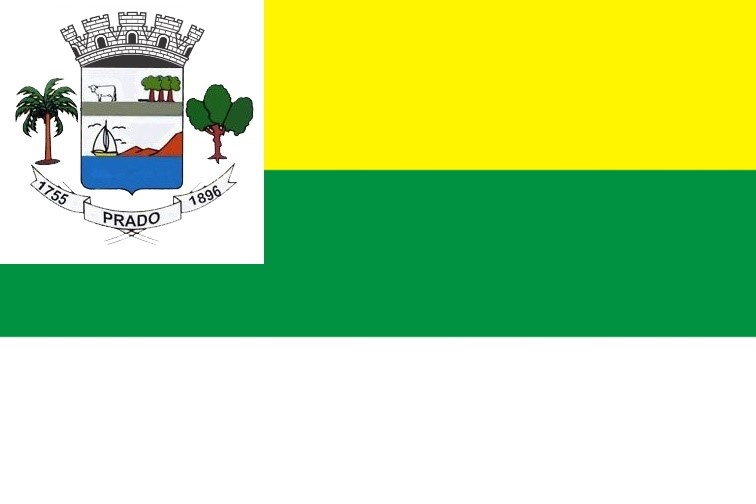
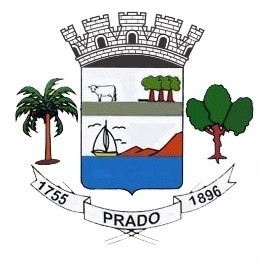
- Flag Coat of arms

- Location in Bahia
- Country: Brazil
- Region: Nordeste
- State: Bahia

Population (2020)
  - Total: 28,194
- Time zone: UTC−3 (BRT)

Prado is a municipality in the state of Bahia in the North-East region of Brazil.

The municipality contains the Descobrimento National Park, a conservation unit of 22,694 hectares (56,080 acres) created in 1999. It also contains part of the Corumbau Marine Extractive Reserve, a protected offshore fishing area of 89,597 hectares (221,400 acres).

== See also ==
- List of municipalities in Bahia
