= Aphilodontinae =

Scientific classification
- Kingdom: Animalia
- Phylum: Arthropoda
- Subphylum: Myriapoda
- Class: Chilopoda
- Order: Geophilomorpha
- Family: Geophilidae
- Subfamily: Aphilodontinae; Silvestri, 1909

Type genus
- Aphilodon Silvestri, 1898

Genera
- Aphilodon Silvestri, 1898; Mairata Calvanese, Brescovit & Bonato, 2019; Mecophilus Silvestri, 1909; Philacroterium Attems, 1926

Subfamily of centipedes

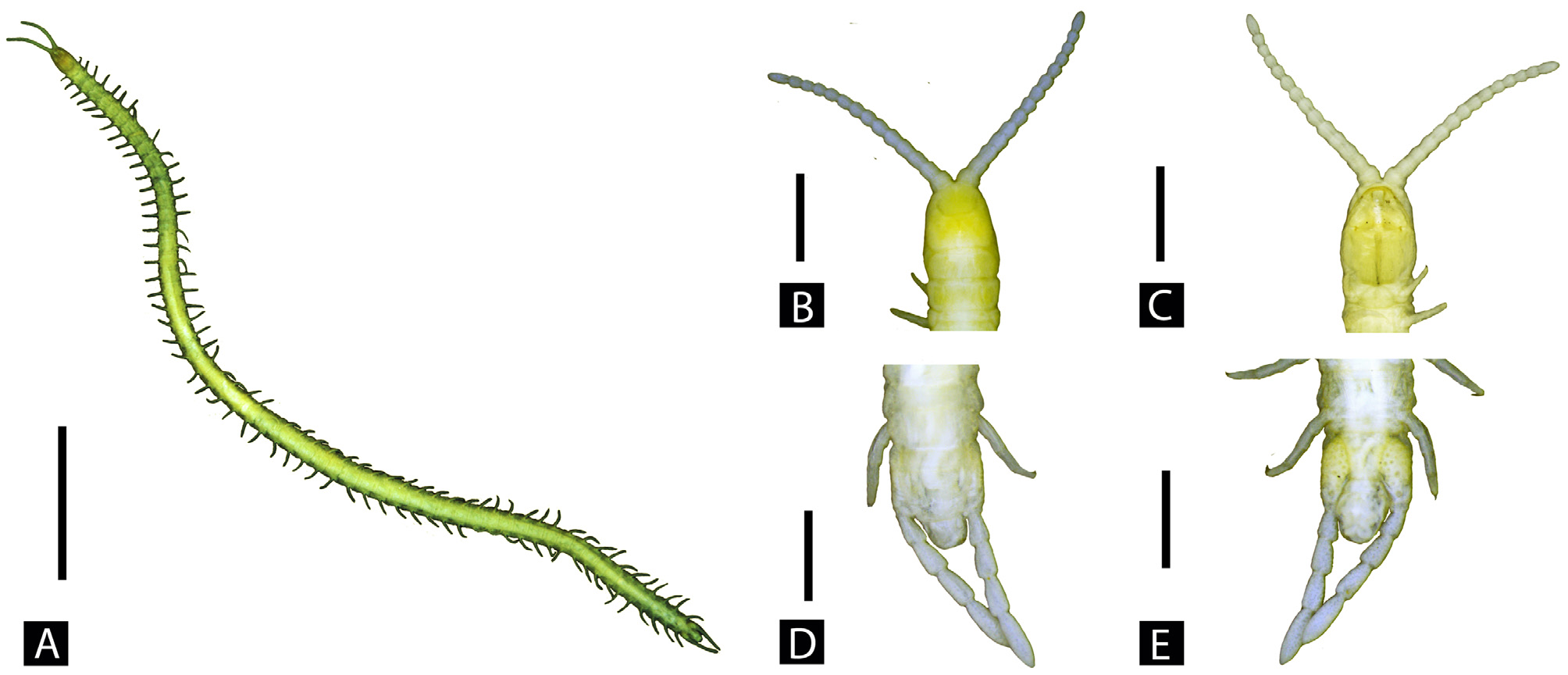

Aphilodontinae is a monophyletic group of soil centipedes previously known as the family Aphilodontidae in the order Geophilomorpha. This clade is now considered a subfamily in the family Geophilidae and has been renamed accordingly. This subfamily now includes more than 30 described species distributed among four genera.

== Phylogeny and taxonomy ==
In 2014, a phylogenetic analysis of the order Geophilomorpha based on morphological and molecular data found the family Aphilodontidae nested within the family Geophilidae. To avoid paraphyly of the family Geophilidae with respect to Aphilodontidae, authorities dismissed Aphilodontidae as a separate family. Authorities now deem Aphilodontidae to be a junior synonym of Geophilidae. A phylogenetic analysis of the family Geophilidae based on morphology confirms the monophyly of the subfamily Aphilodontinae. The morphological evidence also places this subfamily in a clade with the geophilid genus Geoperingueyia, which emerges as the closest relative of this subfamily in a phylogenetic tree of the family Geophilidae.

== Distribution and habitats ==
Centipedes in this subfamily are found in South America and South Africa. In South Africa, these centipedes are found in Northern Cape, Western Cape, Eastern Cape, North West, Mpumalanga, and KwaZulu-Natal provinces. In South America, these centipedes are found from the Pampas in Argentina to the Atlantic Forest in Brazil and eastern Paraguay, as well as in the Pantanal, the Cerrado, and the Caatinga in Brazil.

== Description ==
This subfamily is characterized by forcipules with only three articles (combining the trochanteroprefemur and femur) and sternites without ventral pores. The lateral parts of the labrum in this subfamily are either inconspicuous thin membranes or apparently missing. Furthermore, the intermediate part of the clypeus features "sub-clypeal" setae, that is, two paired groups of setae in addition to the lateral and post-antennal groups. The poison gland has an unusual location, with part of the gland well inside the anterior leg-bearing portion of the trunk and only the ducts in the forcipules.

The number of legs in this subfamily varies within species as well as among species and ranges from as few as 33 pairs of legs (in Mecophilus carioca) to as many as 93 pairs (in Aphilodon cangaceiro). The three species in the Brazilian genus Mecophilus have the fewest legs (33 or 35 pairs) and smallest size (6.5 to 8 mm in length) in this subfamily. The species A. meganae is also notable for its small size (7 to 8 mm in length), the smallest in its genus. The species A. cangaceiro is notable for its many legs, with females featuring as many as 93 leg pairs, the maximum number recorded in this subfamily. The species A. micronyx and A. pereirai can each reach 70 mm in length, the maximum size recorded in this subfamily.

The species in this subfamily share a distinctive set of traits with their close relatives in the genus Geoperingueyia. For example, the male in all of these species features a pair of ultimate legs with only one tarsal article. Furthermore, in all these species, the middle part of the labrum is indistinct, and the distal element of the second maxillae is relatively short and lacks a claw. Moreover, the second and third articles of the forcipules in these species feature setae near the tips of the denticles.

The centipedes in this subfamily can be distinguished from their close relatives, however, based on a set of other traits. These diagnostic traits include forcipules with only three articles, sternites without ventral pores, and sub-clypeal setae. Furthermore, the lateral parts of the labrum are distinctive insofar as they are either membranous or apparently missing.

== Genera ==
This subfamily includes the following genera:

- Aphilodon Silvestri, 1898
- Mairata Calvanese, Brescovit & Bonato 2019
- Mecophilus Silvestri, 1909
- Philacroterium Attems, 1926
