= Zelanophilus kapiti =

Scientific classification
- Kingdom: Animalia
- Phylum: Arthropoda
- Subphylum: Myriapoda
- Class: Chilopoda
- Order: Geophilomorpha
- Family: Zelanophilidae
- Genus: Zelanophilus
- Species: Z. kapiti

Binomial name
- Zelanophilus kapiti Archey, 1922

Species of centipede

Zelanophilus kapiti is a species of centipede in the Zelanophilidae family. It is endemic to New Zealand. It was first described in 1922 by New Zealand zoologist Gilbert Archey. Some authorities, including Archey himself, would later deem Z. kapiti to be a junior synonym of a similar species, Z. provocator.

== Description ==
This species is yellow and can reach 38 mm in length with 69 pairs of legs.

== Distribution ==
The type locality is Kapiti Island, off the west coast of the lower North Island.
