= Gonibregmatus plurimipes =

Scientific classification
- Kingdom: Animalia
- Phylum: Arthropoda
- Subphylum: Myriapoda
- Class: Chilopoda
- Order: Geophilomorpha
- Family: Gonibregmatidae
- Genus: Gonibregmatus
- Species: G. plurimipes

Binomial name
- Gonibregmatus plurimipes Chamberlin, 1920

Species of centipede

Gonibregmatus plurimipes is a species of soil centipede in the Gonibregmatidae family. This centipede is found in Fiji. This species is notable for featuring 191 pairs of legs, which is the maximum number found in any centipede.

== Discovery ==
This species was described in 1920 by American myriapodologist Ralph Vary Chamberlin. Chamberlain based the original description of this species on a single specimen. This holotype is deposited in the Museum of Comparative Zoology at Harvard University. This specimen was found in Lomati, on Kaduvu island in Fiji, and remains the only specimen recorded.

== Description ==
This species is reddish-yellow, and the only specimen described has 191 pairs of legs. The antennae are broad and flattened at the base, gradually narrowing to the middle, then almost uniform and cylindrical beyond that point. The head lacks a distinct transverse suture, and the middle part of the labrum has a convex margin.

The short sclerite in front of the forcipular tergite is exposed, and the forcipular tergite is wider than the dorsal head plate. When the forcipules are closed, their claws reach to the end of the first article of the antennae. The spiracles take the form of vertical slits. The anterior and posterior tergites of the last leg-bearing segment are almost completely fused, but are separated by a shallow furrow. This furrow is bowed toward the posterior and rounded in the middle. The ultimate legs are obviously longer than the penultimate legs. The last sternite is wider than long.

This centipede exhibits traits shared with other species in the genus Gonibregmatus. These traits include spiracles in the form of vertical slits. The species G. plurimipes shares an especially distinctive set of traits with G. anguinus. For example, in both of these species, the anterior and posterior tergites of the last leg-bearing segment are separated by only a shallow furrow, whereas these two tergites are more distinctly separate in G. cumingii and G. fijianus, completely merged in G. insularis, and fused in the middle but separated laterally by a short transverse furrow in G. olivaceus. Furthermore, the middle of the labrum in both G. plurimipes and G. anguinus has a convex margin.

The species G. plurimipes can be distinguished from G. anguinus, however, based on other traits. For example, G. anguinus features a distinct transverse suture on the head, whereas this suture is absent in G. plurimipes. Furthermore, G. plurimipes features many more legs than G. anguinus, which has only 115 to 129 leg pairs.
