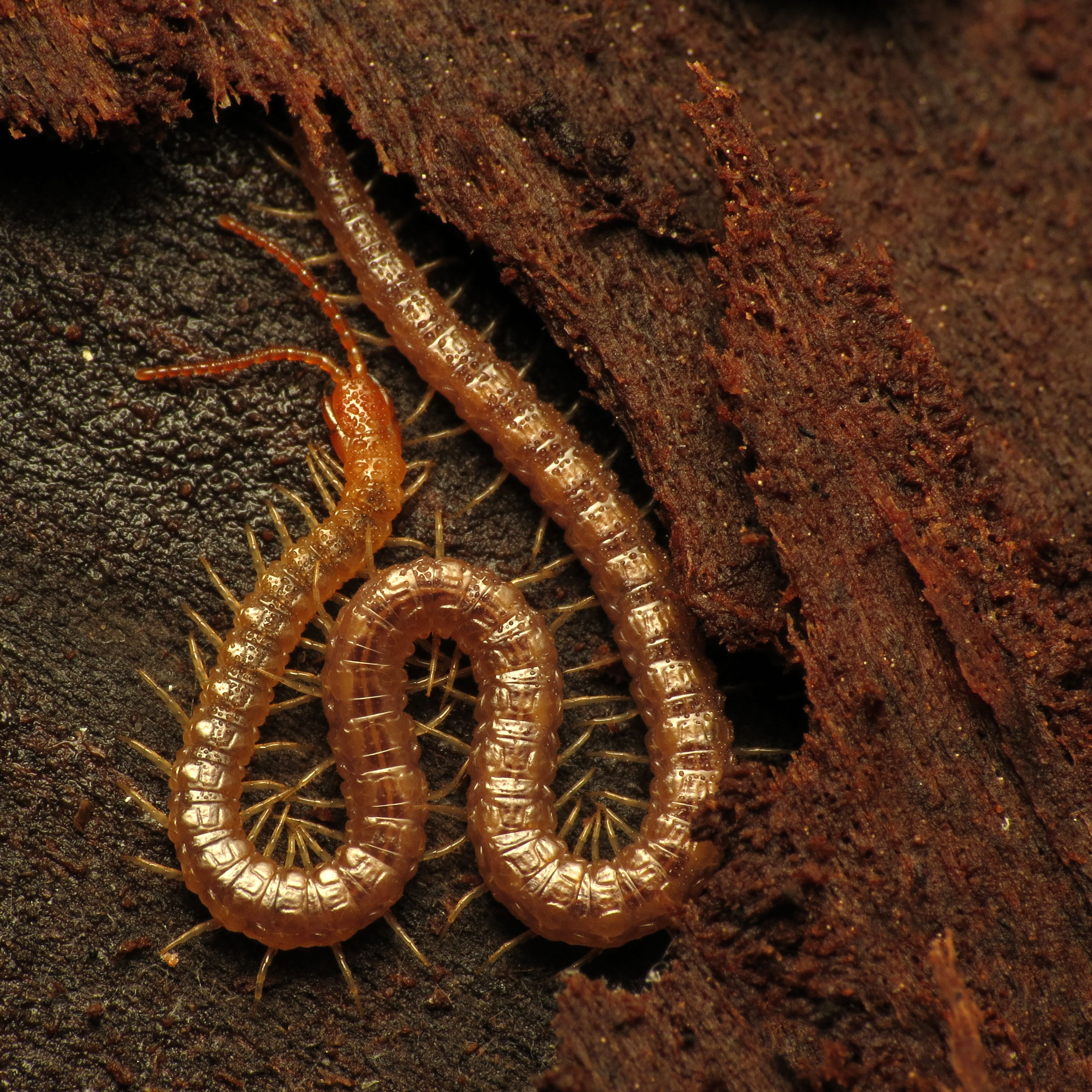
- Geophilus sp. from Rock Creek Park, Washington, DC, USA

Scientific classification
- Kingdom: Animalia
- Phylum: Arthropoda
- Subphylum: Myriapoda
- Class: Chilopoda
- Order: Geophilomorpha
- Suborder: Adesmata
- Superfamily: Geophiloidea

Families
- Geophilidae; Gonibregmatidae; Zelanophilidae

= Geophiloidea =

Superfamily of centipedes

Geophiloidea (from Ancient Greek γεω- (geo-), meaning "earth", and φίλος (phílos), meaning "lover") is a superfamily in the order Geophilomorpha and suborder Adesmata containing the families Zelanophilidae, Gonibregmatidae (including Eriphantidae and Neogeophilidae), and Geophilidae (including Aphilodontidae, Dignathodontidae, Linotaeniidae, Chilenophilinae, and Macronicophilidae). This superfamily is characterized by features of the chamber leading to the mouth opening: The border between the proximal (clypeal) part and the distal (labral) part of the roof of this chamber (epipharynx) is divided into two lobes. Furthermore, the spines on the bottom of this chamber (hypopharynx) extend to most frontal and ventral parts of this floor. Another diagnostic trait of this superfamily are the mandibles, which each feature a single lamella resembling a comb.
