= Orphnaeus atopus =

Scientific classification
- Kingdom: Animalia
- Phylum: Arthropoda
- Subphylum: Myriapoda
- Class: Chilopoda
- Order: Geophilomorpha
- Family: Oryidae
- Genus: Orphnaeus
- Species: O. atopus

Binomial name
- Orphnaeus atopus (Chamberlin, 1920)

Synonyms
- Azygethus atopus Chamberlin, 1920

Species of centipede

Orphnaeus atopus is a species of centipede in the Mecistocephalidae family. It was described in 1920 by American myriapodologist Ralph Vary Chamberlin. The original description of this species is based on two reddish yellow female specimens and reports a length of 51 mm and 71 pairs of legs. Some have deemed O. atopus to be a junior synonym of O. brevilabiatus.

== Distribution ==
The species occurs in Fiji. The type locality is Levuka, on the island of Ovalau.
