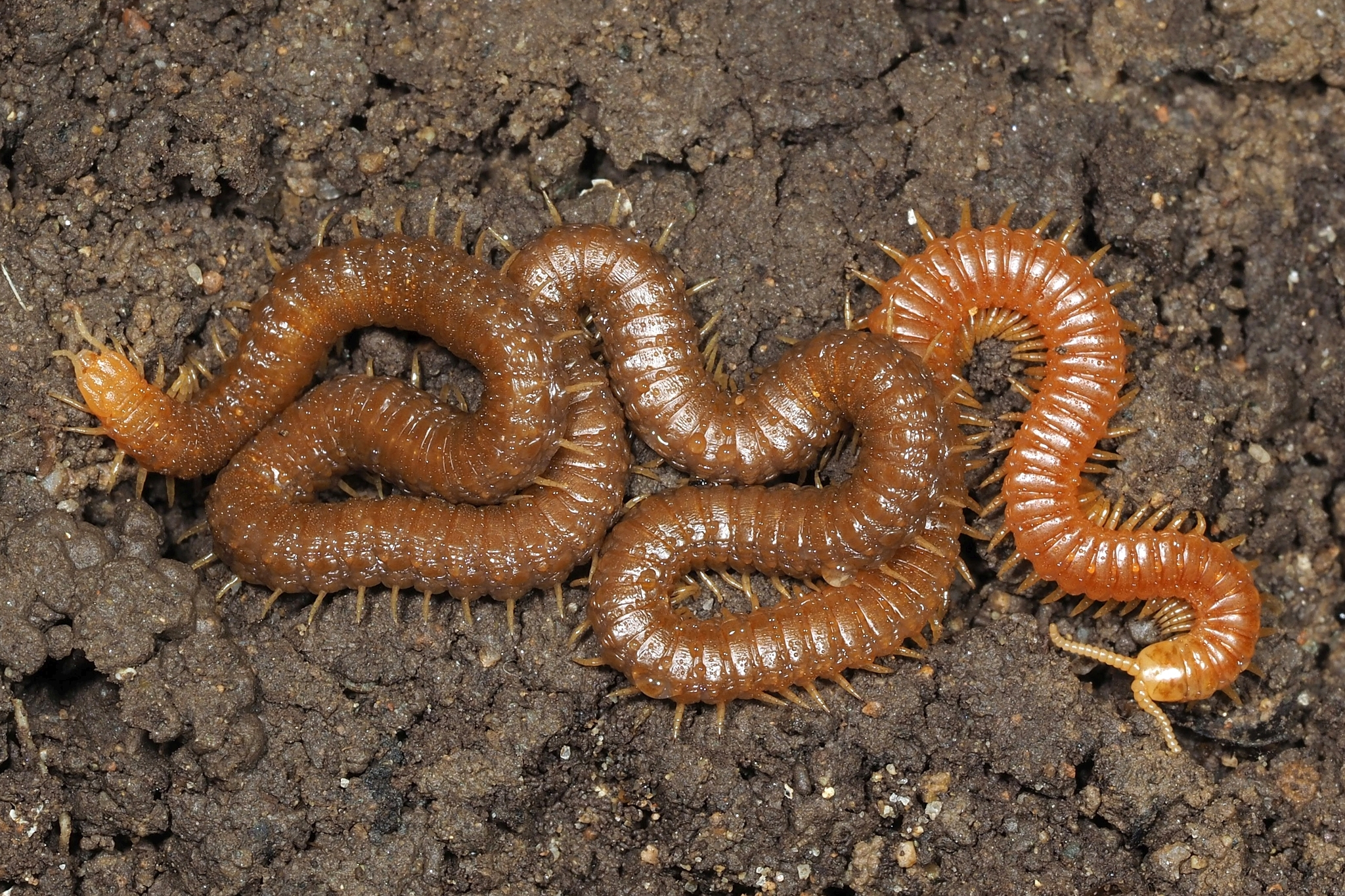
- Himantarium gabrielis

Scientific classification
- Kingdom: Animalia
- Phylum: Arthropoda
- Subphylum: Myriapoda
- Class: Chilopoda
- Order: Geophilomorpha
- Suborder: Adesmata
- Superfamily: Himantarioidea (Bollman, 1893)

Families
- Oryidae; Himantariidae; Schendylidae

= Himantarioidea =

Family of centipedes

Himantarioidea is a monophyletic superfamily of soil centipedes in the suborder Adesmata containing the families Oryidae, Himantariidae, and Schendylidae (including Ballophilidae). Centipedes in this superfamily share several distinctive traits. For example, the lateral parts of the labrum in these centipedes are fringed by denticles along the posterior margin. Furthermore, in this superfamily, the proximal (clypeal) part of the roof of the chamber leading to the mouth opening features clusters of spear-shaped sense organs. Moreover, each telopodite of the second maxillae in these centipedes ends in a pretarsus that is flattened at the tip.
