= Zelanophilus pococki =

Scientific classification
- Kingdom: Animalia
- Phylum: Arthropoda
- Subphylum: Myriapoda
- Class: Chilopoda
- Order: Geophilomorpha
- Family: Zelanophilidae
- Genus: Zelanophilus
- Species: Z. pococki

Binomial name
- Zelanophilus pococki Crabill, 1963

Species of centipede

Zelanophilus pococki is a species of centipede in the Zelanophilidae family. It was first described in 1963 by R.E. Crabill.

== Etymology ==
The epithet pococki commemorates Reginald Innes Pocock of the British Museum (Natural History).

== Description ==
The original description of this species is based on five female specimens ranging from 38 mm to 67 mm in length with 61 or 73 pairs of legs and a male specimen measuring 44 mm in length with 59 leg pairs.

== Distribution ==
The species occurs in coastal south-east New South Wales. The type locality is Hornsby, Sydney.

== Behaviour ==
The centipedes are solitary terrestrial predators that inhabit plant litter and soil.
