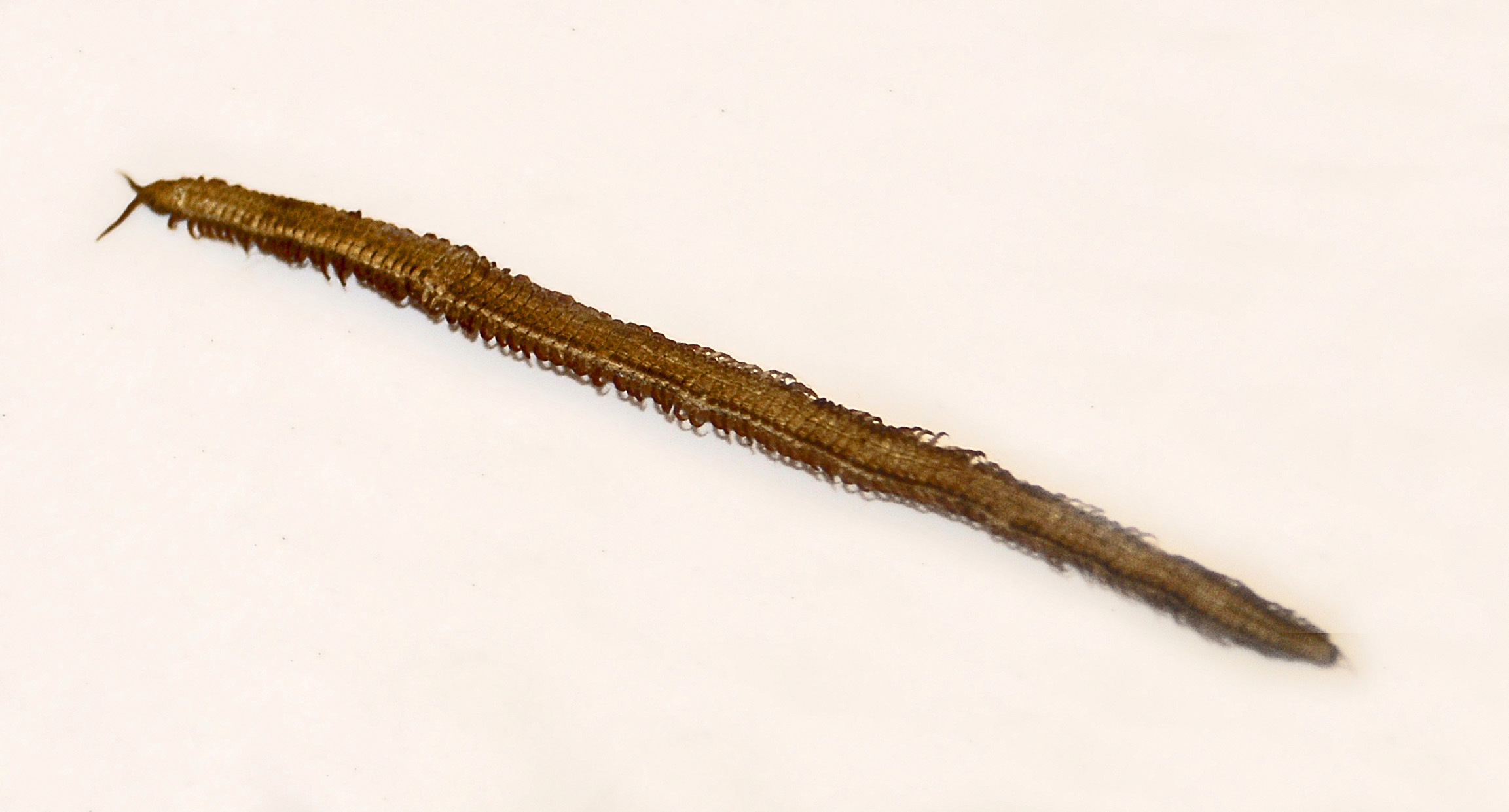
- Orya barbarica from Tunisia. Museum specimen

Scientific classification
- Kingdom: Animalia
- Phylum: Arthropoda
- Subphylum: Myriapoda
- Class: Chilopoda
- Order: Geophilomorpha
- Family: Oryidae
- Genus: Orya
- Species: O. barbarica

Binomial name
- Orya barbarica (Gervais, 1835)

= Orya barbarica =

Species of centipede

Orya barbarica is a species of centipedes belonging to the family Oryidae.

This North African species is notable for its large size, reaching a length of 15–17 centimetres (5.9–6.7 in). This species has from 107 to 125 pairs of legs.
