= Tasmanophilus spenceri =

Scientific classification
- Kingdom: Animalia
- Phylum: Arthropoda
- Subphylum: Myriapoda
- Class: Chilopoda
- Order: Geophilomorpha
- Family: Zelanophilidae
- Genus: Tasmanophilus
- Species: T. spenceri

Binomial name
- Tasmanophilus spenceri (Pocock, 1901)

Species of centipede

Tasmanophilus spenceri is a species of centipede in the family Zelanophilidae. This centipede is found only in New Zealand and has only 39 pairs of legs, the minimum number recorded in the family Zelanophilidae. This species reaches only 23 mm in length and is the smallest centipede in this family.

== Discovery ==
This species was first described in 1901 by the British zoologist Reginald Innes Pocock. The original description is based on a female holotype found at The Bluff on the South Island of New Zealand. The species name spenceri honours the British-Australian evolutionary biologist Baldwin Spencer.

== Taxonomy ==
Pocock originally described this species in 1901 under the name Necrophloeophagus spenceri. In 1920, the American biologist Ralph V. Chamberlain proposed moving this species to the genus Geophilus, and in 1936, the New Zealand zoologist Gilbert Archey provided a more detailed description of this species under the name Geophilus spenceri. In 1962, the American myriapodologist Ralph E. Crabill, Jr., of the Smithsonian Institution assigned this species to the genus Tasmanophilus, which Chamberlain originally described in 1920.

== Description ==
This species can reach 23 mm in length, and both males and females have 39 pairs of legs. The middle part of the labrum features several distinct teeth, and the side pieces of the labrum are fringed. The first maxillae feature distinct lappets projecting from the lateral margins, and the second maxillae each feature a long curved claw. The claws on the forcipule are curved, stout, and long enough to reach the front of the head. These claws are each armed with a blunt tubercle. Pores appear in transverse bands in the posterior portion of each sternite but become progressively smaller and sparser after the 29th segment. The basal element of each of the ultimate legs features evenly spaced pores, 12 to 14 large pores on the lower surface and four on the upper surface. The ultimate legs in the male are very broad and thick, with a small claw, a few long hairs above, and a dense covering of fine hairs below. The male also features many fine hairs on the last sternite.

The species T. spenceri shares several features with T. opinatus, the only other species in the genus Tasmanophilus. For example, the anterior sternites in both species feature an unusual medial depression. These pits appear in the first 15 sternites in T. spenceri and in the first 25 sternites in T. opinatus. The species T. opinatus, however, features 69 pairs of legs, many more than T. spenceri has. Furthermore, T. spenceri has distinctly larger pores and wider sternites.

== Distribution ==
This centipede is endemic to the South Island of New Zealand. This species has been recorded only at the type locality, The Bluff, near Invercargill in the Southland Region.
