= Eucratonyx hamatus =

Scientific classification
- Kingdom: Animalia
- Phylum: Arthropoda
- Subphylum: Myriapoda
- Class: Chilopoda
- Order: Geophilomorpha
- Family: Gonibregmatidae
- Genus: Eucratonyx
- Species: E. hamatus

Binomial name
- Eucratonyx hamatus Pocock, 1899

Species of centipede

Eucratonyx hamatus is a species of centipede in the Gonibregmatidae family. It was described in 1899 by British zoologist Reginald Innes Pocock.

== Description ==
This species can reach 85 mm in length and can have as many as few as 103 pairs of legs (in males) or as many as 125 leg pairs (in females).

== Distribution ==
The species occurs in New Britain, Papua New Guinea.
