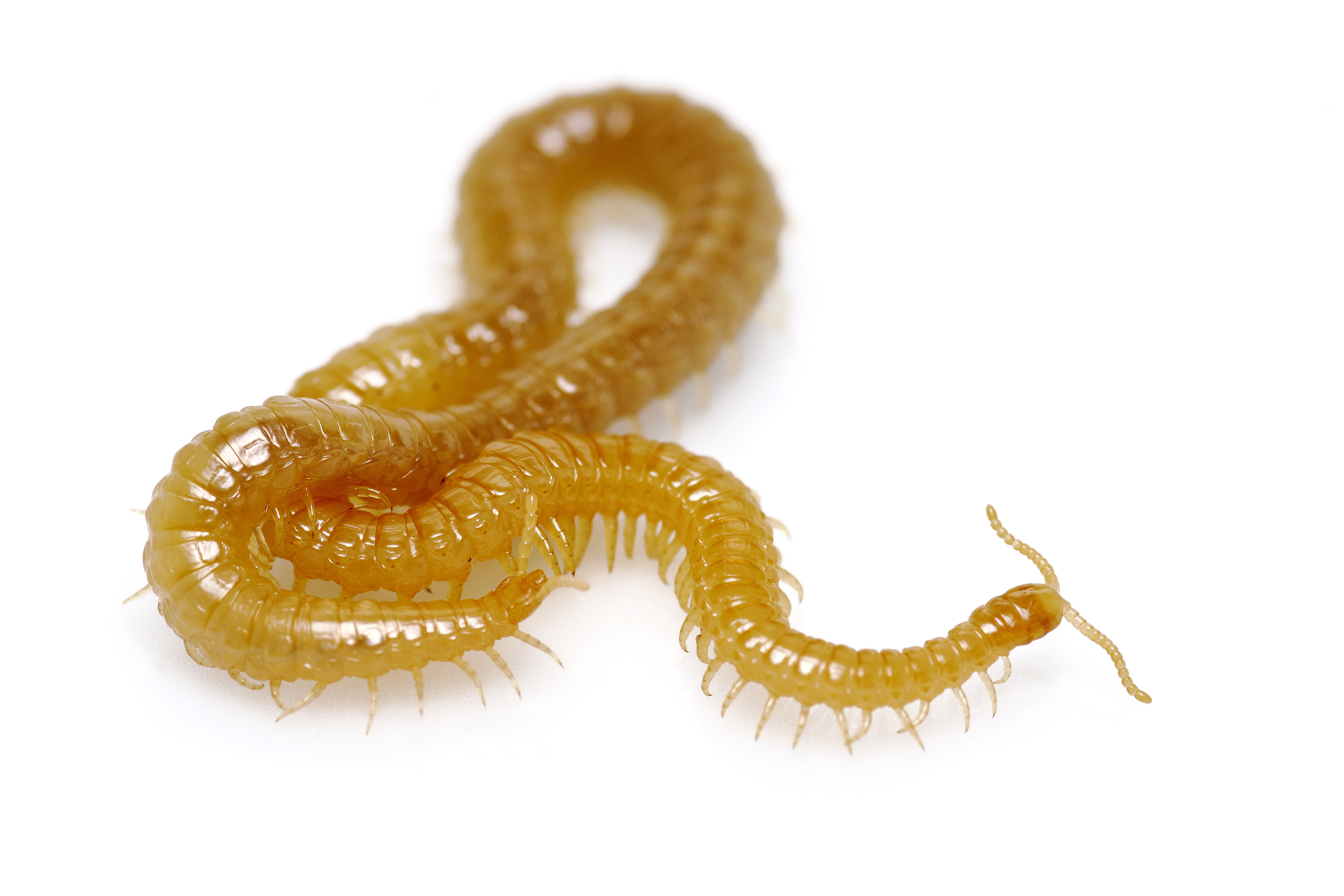
- Haplophilus subterranea

Scientific classification
- Kingdom: Animalia
- Phylum: Arthropoda
- Subphylum: Myriapoda
- Class: Chilopoda
- Order: Geophilomorpha
- Suborder: Adesmata
- Superfamily: Himantarioidea
- Family: Himantariidae; Bollman, 1893

= Himantariidae =

Family of centipedes

Himantariidae is a monophyletic family of centipedes in the order Geophilomorpha and superfamily Himantarioidea, found almost exclusively in the Northern Hemisphere. Centipedes in this family feature a short head with a concave labral margin bearing a row of denticles, a single dentate lamella and some pectinate lamellae on each mandible, second maxillae with strongly tapering telopodites and slightly spatulate claws, and a stout forcipular segment with short forcipules and a wide tergite; the ultimate legs usually have no pretarsus, and the female gonopods are distinct and biarticulate.

These centipedes are very elongated with a high mean number of trunk segments (often greater than 100) and great variability in this number within species. The number of leg-bearing segments in this family ranges from 47 to 181. The maximum number of legs recorded in this family (181 pairs) appears in the species Chomatobius bakeri. The minimum number of legs recorded in this family (47 pairs) appears in the species Garriscaphus oreines,

This family contains these genera:

- Acrophilus
- Bothriogaster
- Californiphilus
- Causerium
- Chomatobius
- Diadenoschisma
- Geoballus
- Gosiphilus
- Gosothrix
- Haplophilus
- Himantariella
- Himantarium
- Meinertophilus
- Mesocanthus
- Nesoporogaster
- Nothobius
- Notiphilus
- Notobius
- Polyporogaster
- Pseudohimantarium
- Stigmatogaster
- Straberax
- Thracophilus
