= Eucratonyx =

Scientific classification
- Kingdom: Animalia
- Phylum: Arthropoda
- Subphylum: Myriapoda
- Class: Chilopoda
- Order: Geophilomorpha
- Family: Gonibregmatidae
- Genus: Eucratonyx; Pocock, 1898

Type species
- Eucratonyx meinerti Pocock, 1889

Genus of centipedes

Eucratonyx is a genus of centipedes in the family Gonibregmatidae. This genus was described in 1898 by British zoologist Reginald Innes Pocock. Centipedes in this genus are found from the Andaman Islands to New Britain.

== Description ==
Centipedes in this genus feature a concave labral margin fringed by denticles, sternal pores in two anterior paired groups and a posterior band, enlarged claws on some anterior legs with a very elongate basal branch, and coalescent female gonopods. These centipedes range from about 8 cm to 13 cm in length and have 103 to 129 pairs of legs. The smallest species in this genus, Eucratonyx hamatus, can reach 85 mm in length and range from 103 pairs of legs (in males) to 125 pairs (in females); the largest species, E. meinerti, can reach 130 mm in length and range from 103 leg pairs to 129 pairs, the maximum number recorded in this genus.

== Species ==
There are two valid species:

- Eucratonyx hamatus Pocock, 1899
- Eucratonyx meinerti (Pocock, 1889)
