= Zelanophilus provocator =

Scientific classification
- Kingdom: Animalia
- Phylum: Arthropoda
- Subphylum: Myriapoda
- Class: Chilopoda
- Order: Geophilomorpha
- Family: Zelanophilidae
- Genus: Zelanophilus
- Species: Z. provocator

Binomial name
- Zelanophilus provocator (Pocock, 1891)

Synonyms
- Australiophilus microtrichus Attems, 1947; Zelanophilus wheeleri Chamberlin, 1920

Species of centipede

Zelanophilus provocator is a species of centipede in the Zelanophilidae family. It is endemic to New Zealand. It was first described in 1891 by British zoologist Reginald Innes Pocock. The original description of this species is based on two male specimens with 69 pairs of legs and reports a length of 59 mm, but other specimens indicate that this species can have from 67 to 77 pairs and that females can reach 75 mm in length.

== Distribution ==
The type locality is Wellington.
