= Chamberlinia =

Scientific classification
- Kingdom: Animalia
- Phylum: Arthropoda
- Subphylum: Myriapoda
- Class: Chilopoda
- Order: Geophilomorpha
- Family: Oryidae
- Genus: Chamberlinia; Machado, 1951
- Species: C. lineata

Binomial name
- Chamberlinia lineata Machado, 1951

Genus of centipedes

Chamberlinia is a monotypic genus of centipedes belonging to the family Oryidae. Centipedes in this genus are about 10 cm long, have 67 to 113 pairs of legs, and are found in Angola. The only species is Chamberlinia lineata.

The taxon is named after American biologist Ralph Vary Chamberlin.
