= Tasmanophilus =

Scientific classification
- Kingdom: Animalia
- Phylum: Arthropoda
- Subphylum: Myriapoda
- Class: Chilopoda
- Order: Geophilomorpha
- Family: Zelanophilidae
- Genus: Tasmanophilus; Chamberlin, 1920

Type species
- Tasmanophilus tasmanianus Chamberlin, 1920

Synonyms
- Tasmaniophilus Verhoeff, 1937

Genus of centipedes

Tasmanophilus is a genus of centipedes in the family Zelanophilidae. This genus was described by American biologist Ralph Vary Chamberlin in 1920. Centipedes in this genus are found in Australia and New Zealand. This genus contains only two species.

== Description ==
Centipedes in this genus feature short forcipules with denticles, a broad forcipular coxosternite, anterior trunk metasternites with an unusual medial depression and pores arranged into an anterior pair of groups and a posterior transverse band, and scattered coxal pores. The claws of the second maxillae have small filaments. The female gonopods are distinct and biarticulate. These centipedes range from about 2 cm to about 5 cm in length and have 39 to 69 pairs of legs.

== Species ==
This genus includes two valid species:

- Tasmanophilus opinatus (Newport, 1845)
- Tasmanophilus spenceri (Pocock, 1901)
