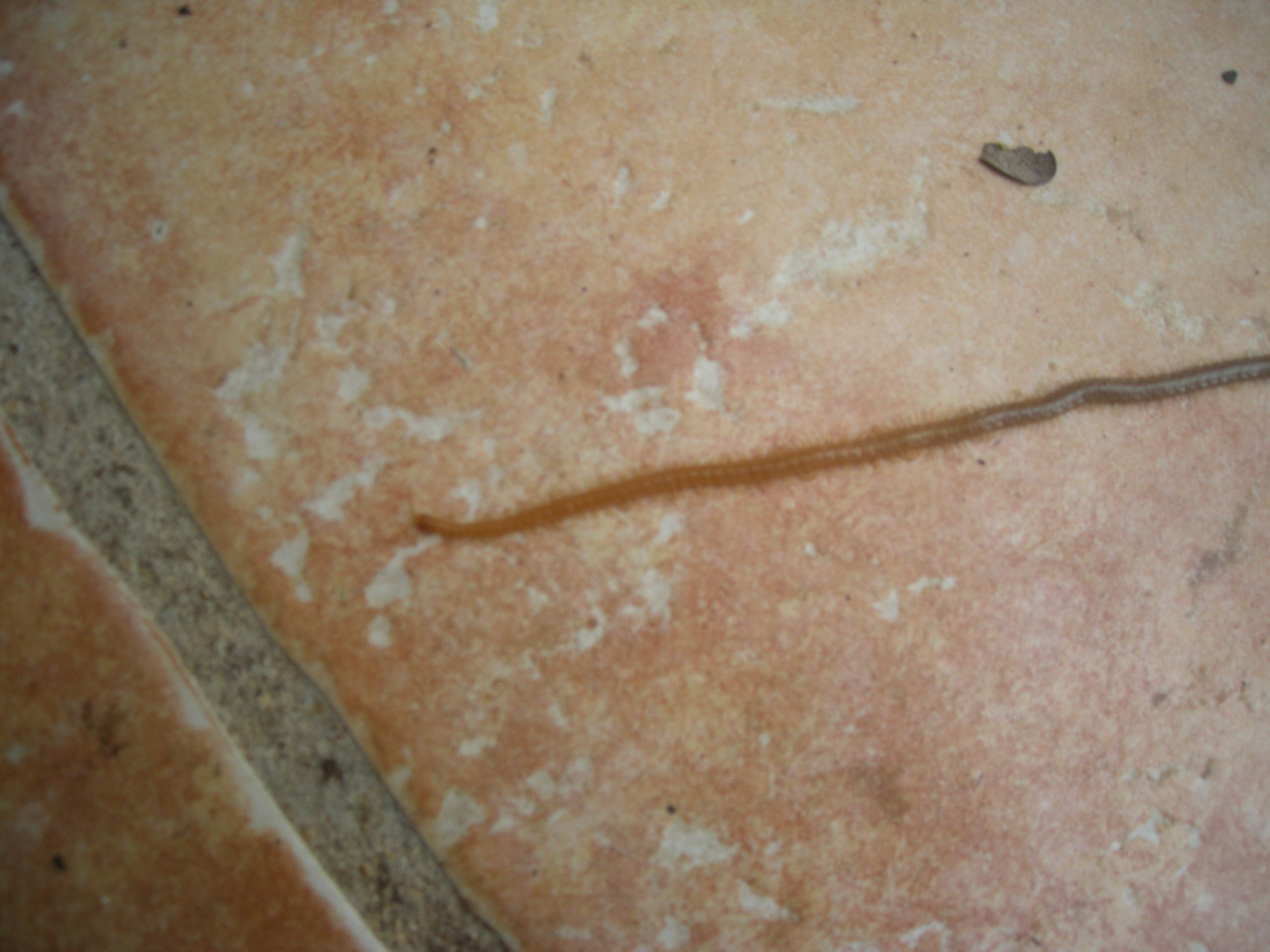
- Himantarium gabrielis

Scientific classification
- Kingdom: Animalia
- Phylum: Arthropoda
- Subphylum: Myriapoda
- Class: Chilopoda
- Order: Geophilomorpha
- Family: Himantariidae
- Genus: Himantarium (C.L. Koch, 1847)

= Himantarium =

Genus of centipedes

Himantarium is a genus of centipedes in the family Himantariidae. Centipedes in this genus feature a swollen trunk that is posteriorly stout, subcircular sternal pore-fields on almost all trunk segments, much inflated coxapleura completely covered with scattered pores, and a very small metasternite on the ultimate leg-bearing segment; each mandible has a robust dentate lamella and few pectinate lamellae. These centipedes range from 10 cm to 20 cm in length, have from 87 to 179 pairs of legs, and are found in the Mediterranean region. Both the minimum (87 pairs) and the maximum (179 pairs) number of legs in this genus appear in the species Himantarium gabrielis, which exhibits a striking degree of intraspecific variation in leg number.

== Species ==
- Himantarium europaeum (Chalande & Ribaut, 1909)
- Himantarium gabrielis (Linnaeus, 1767)
- Himantarium mediterraneum (Meinert, 1870)
- Himantarium samuelraji Sundara Rajulu, 1971
- Himantarium tenue Latzel, 1886
