= Stigmatogaster =

Scientific classification
- Kingdom: Animalia
- Phylum: Arthropoda
- Subphylum: Myriapoda
- Class: Chilopoda
- Order: Geophilomorpha
- Family: Himantariidae
- Genus: Stigmatogaster; Latzel, 1880

Genus of centipedes

Stigmatogaster is a genus of centipedes in the family Himantariidae. Centipedes in this genus feature a relatively slender trunk, transversally slightly elongate sternal pore-fields on almost all trunk segments, and unusual lateral furrows on some trunk metasternites; most coxal organs open into a dorsal pouch covered by the metatergite. These centipedes range from 5 cm to 10 cm in length, have 83 to 111 pairs of legs, and are found in the Mediterranean region. This genus contains the following species:

- Stigmatogaster arcishericulis Brölemann, 1904
- Stigmatogaster atlanteus (Verhoeff, 1938)
- Stigmatogaster dimidiatus (Meinert, 1870)
- Stigmatogaster excavatus (Verhoeff, 1924)
- Stigmatogaster gracilis (Meinert, 1870)
- Stigmatogaster sardoa Verhoeff, 1901
- Stigmatogaster superbus (Meinert, 1870)
- Stigmatogaster tufi Iorio, 2021

Stigmatogaster souletina and Stigmatogaster subterraneus have been moved to the genus Haplophilus, but the change is not universally accepted; many sources still classify them in the genus Stigmatogaster.
