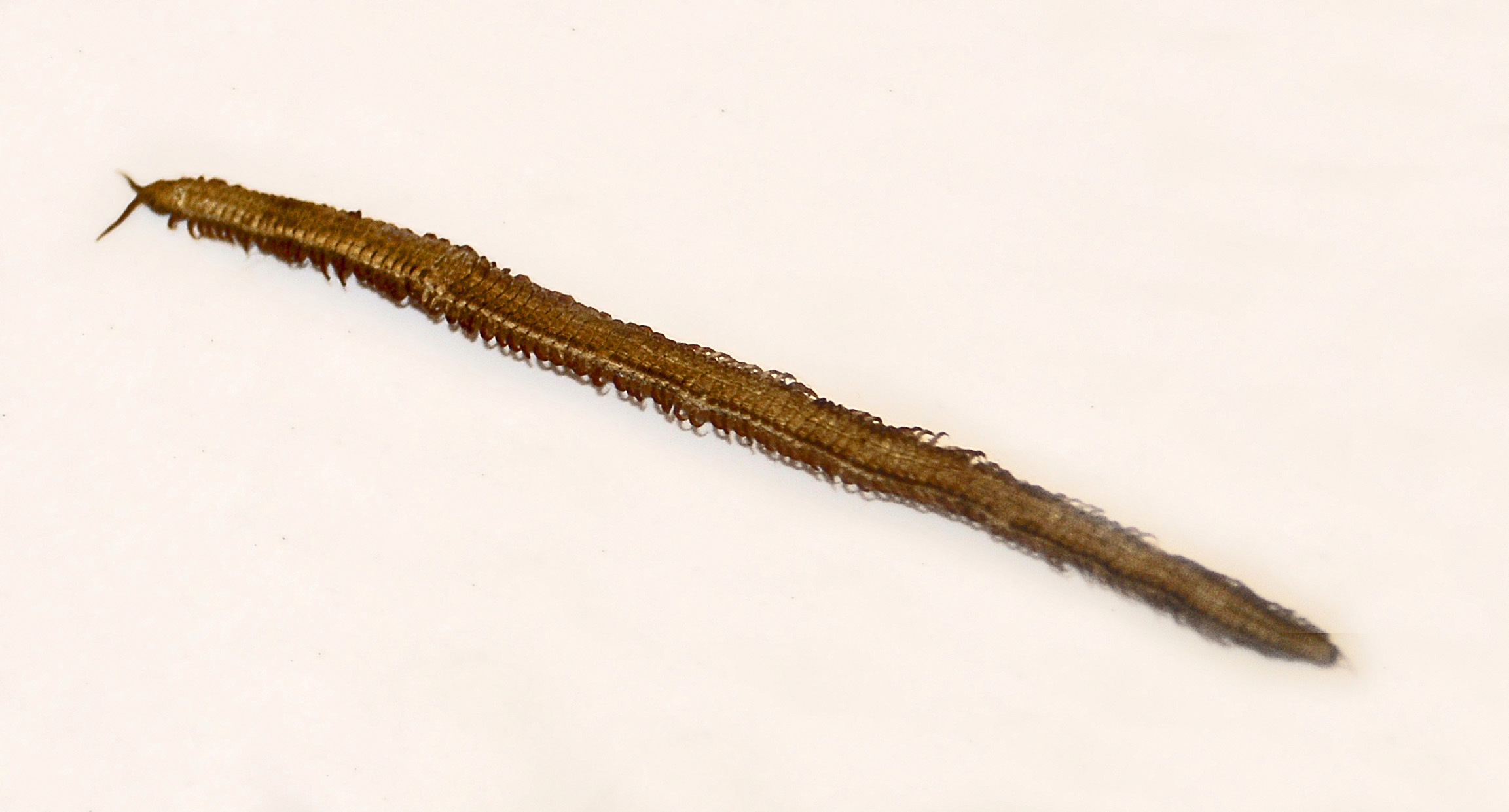
- Orya barbarica

Scientific classification
- Kingdom: Animalia
- Phylum: Arthropoda
- Subphylum: Myriapoda
- Class: Chilopoda
- Order: Geophilomorpha
- Family: Oryidae
- Genus: Orya; Meinert, 1870

= Orya (centipede) =

Genus of centipedes

Orya is a genus of centipedes belonging to the family Oryidae. Centipedes in this genus feature claws on the second maxillae without marginal filaments and trunk segments with an unusual pattern of pleurites. These centipedes range from 5 cm to 22 cm in length, have about 81 to 125 pairs of legs, and are found in northwest Africa and the Iberian Peninsula.

== Species ==
Species within this genus include:

- Orya almohadensis
- Orya barbarica
- Orya panousei
- Orya voeltzkowi
