= Marshallopus =

Scientific classification
- Kingdom: Animalia
- Phylum: Arthropoda
- Subphylum: Myriapoda
- Class: Chilopoda
- Order: Geophilomorpha
- Family: Oryidae
- Genus: Marshallopus; Verhoeff, 1937

Type species
- Orphnaeus platypedatus Takakuwa, 1934

Genus of centipedes

Marshallopus is a monotypic genus of centipedes in the family Oryidae. It was described by German myriapodologist Karl Wilhelm Verhoeff in 1937. The sole species is Marshallopus platypedatus (Takakuwa, 1934).

== Description ==
Centipedes in this genus are melanised in patches, and their ultimate legs are basally swollen and distally flattened. These centipedes range from 2 cm to 3 cm in length and have about 69 pairs of legs.

== Distribution ==
The species occurs in Micronesia. The type locality is the Marshall Islands.
