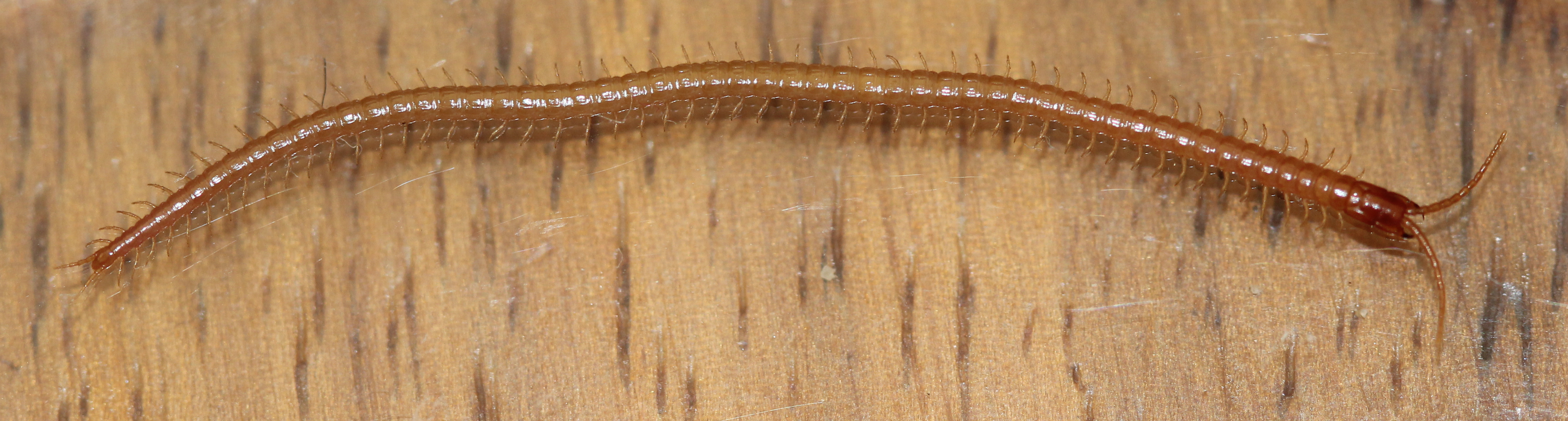
- Aspidopleres species

Scientific classification
- Kingdom: Animalia
- Phylum: Arthropoda
- Subphylum: Myriapoda
- Class: Chilopoda
- Order: Geophilomorpha
- Family: Oryidae
- Genus: Aspidopleres; Porat, 1893
- Species: A. intercalatus

Binomial name
- Aspidopleres intercalatus (Porat, 1893)

= Aspidopleres =

Genus of centipedes

Aspidopleres is an African genus of centipedes belonging to the family Oryidae. Centipedes in this genus feature sternal pores in four broad groups on each metasternite, very short ultimate legs, and uniarticulate female gonopods. These centipedes range from 11 cm to 12 cm in length, have 87 to 105 pairs of legs, and are found in southwest Africa.

== Species ==
Only one accepted species has been described within this genus:

- Aspidopleres intercalatus (Porat, 1893)
