= Tasmanophilus opinatus =

Scientific classification
- Kingdom: Animalia
- Phylum: Arthropoda
- Subphylum: Myriapoda
- Class: Chilopoda
- Order: Geophilomorpha
- Family: Zelanophilidae
- Genus: Tasmanophilus
- Species: T. opinatus

Binomial name
- Tasmanophilus opinatus (Newport, 1845)

Synonyms
- Arthronomalus opinatus Newport, 1845; Tasmaniophilus nichollsii Verhoeff, 1937; Tasmanophilus tasmanianus Chamberlin, 1920

Species of centipede

Tasmanophilus opinatus is a species of centipede in the Zelanophilidae family. It is endemic to Australia, and was first described in 1845 by British entomologist George Newport.

== Description ==
The original description of this species is based on two damaged syntypes missing their posterior ends. A description of another specimen reports a deep orange-yellow color, a length of 54 mm, and 69 pairs of legs.

== Distribution ==
The species occurs in south-eastern Australia, in Victoria and Tasmania.

== Behaviour ==
The centipedes are solitary terrestrial predators that inhabit plant litter, soil and rotting wood.
