= Gonibregmatus =

Scientific classification
- Kingdom: Animalia
- Phylum: Arthropoda
- Subphylum: Myriapoda
- Class: Chilopoda
- Order: Geophilomorpha
- Family: Gonibregmatidae
- Genus: Gonibregmatus; Newport, 1843

Type species
- Gonibregmatus cumingii Newport, 1843

Genus of centipedes

Gonibregmatus is a genus of soil centipedes in the family Gonibregmatidae. This genus was described by British entomologist George Newport in 1843. These centipedes are found from the Philippines and the Malay archipelago to Fiji.

== Description ==
Centipedes in this genus feature a convex labral margin fringed by bristles, uniarticulate telepodites on the first maxillae, claws on the second maxillae without filaments, additional sclerites flanking the trunk tergites, and sternal pores in two transverse bands. These centipedes range in length from about 10 cm to 15 cm and have 99 to 191 pairs of legs. The small species Gonibregmatus olivaceus (with males 97 mm long and females 110 mm long) can have as few as 99 leg pairs (males with 99 to 103 pairs, females with 113 pairs), the minimum number in this genus. The smallest species, G. insularis, reaches only 97 mm in length, whereas the largest species, G. fijianus, can reach 150 mm in length. The species G. plurimipes can have as many as 191 leg pairs, the maximum number found in the class Chilopoda.

== Species ==
There are six valid species:

- Gonibregmatus anguinus Pocock, 1899
- Gonibregmatus cumingii Newport, 1843
- Gonibregmatus fijianus Chamberlin, 1920
- Gonibregmatus insularis Pocock, 1894
- Gonibregmatus olivaceus Attems, 1930
- Gonibregmatus plurimipes Chamberlin, 1920
