= Endoptelus =

Scientific classification
- Kingdom: Animalia
- Phylum: Arthropoda
- Subphylum: Myriapoda
- Class: Chilopoda
- Order: Geophilomorpha
- Family: Oryidae
- Genus: Endoptelus; Chamberlin, 1939

Type species
- Endoptelus papuicolens Chamberlin, 1939

Genus of centipedes

Endoptelus is a monotypic genus of centipedes in the family Oryidae. This genus was described in 1939 by American myriapodologist Ralph Vary Chamberlin. Its sole species is Endoptelus papuicolens Chamberlin, 1939.

== Description ==
This species features unusual processes basal to the most posterior pairs of legs. The original description of this species reports yellow colouration throughout, a length of about 35 mm, and 79 pairs of legs.

== Distribution ==
The species occurs in New Guinea. The type locality is Pionierbivak.
