= Australiophilus longissimus =

Scientific classification
- Kingdom: Animalia
- Phylum: Arthropoda
- Subphylum: Myriapoda
- Class: Chilopoda
- Order: Geophilomorpha
- Family: Zelanophilidae
- Genus: Australiophilus
- Species: A. longissimus

Binomial name
- Australiophilus longissimus Verhoeff, 1925

Species of centipede

Australiophilus longissimus is a species of centipede in the Zelanophilidae family. It is endemic to Australia, and was first described in 1925 by German myriapodologist Karl Wilhelm Verhoeff.

== Description ==
The original description of this species is based on a male specimen measuring 72 mm in length with 117 pairs of legs, the maximum number of leg pairs recorded in the family Zelanophilidae.

== Distribution ==
The species occurs in north-eastern coastal Queensland. The type locality is Herberton.

== Behaviour ==
The centipedes are solitary terrestrial predators that inhabit plant litter, soil and rotting wood.
