= Australiophilus =

Scientific classification
- Kingdom: Animalia
- Phylum: Arthropoda
- Subphylum: Myriapoda
- Class: Chilopoda
- Order: Geophilomorpha
- Family: Zelanophilidae
- Genus: Australiophilus; Verhoeff, 1925

Type species
- Australiophilus longissimus Verhoeff,1925

Genus of centipedes

Australiophilus is a genus of two species of centipedes, in the family Zelanophilidae. This genus was described by German myriapodologist Karl Wilhelm Verhoeff in 1925. Centipedes in this genus are found in Australia and New Zealand.

== Description ==
Centipedes in this genus feature labral lateral parts with dense bristles and ultimate legs with reduced pretarsi, range from about 7 cm to 12 cm in length, and have from 95 to 117 pairs of legs.

== Species ==
Valid species:

- Australiophilus ferrugineus (Hutton, 1877)
- Australiophilus longissimus Verhoeff, 1925
