= Gonibregmatus fijianus =

Scientific classification
- Kingdom: Animalia
- Phylum: Arthropoda
- Subphylum: Myriapoda
- Class: Chilopoda
- Order: Geophilomorpha
- Family: Gonibregmatidae
- Genus: Gonibregmatus
- Species: G. fijianus

Binomial name
- Gonibregmatus fijianus Chamberlin, 1920

Species of centipede

Gonibregmatus fijianus is a species of centipede in the Gonibregmatidae family. It was described in 1920 by American myriapodologist Ralph Vary Chamberlin.

== Description ==
The original description of this species is based on a reddish yellow specimen measuring nearly 150 mm in length with 177 segments.

== Distribution ==
The species occurs in Fiji. Type localities are Nadarivatu and Vanua Ava.
