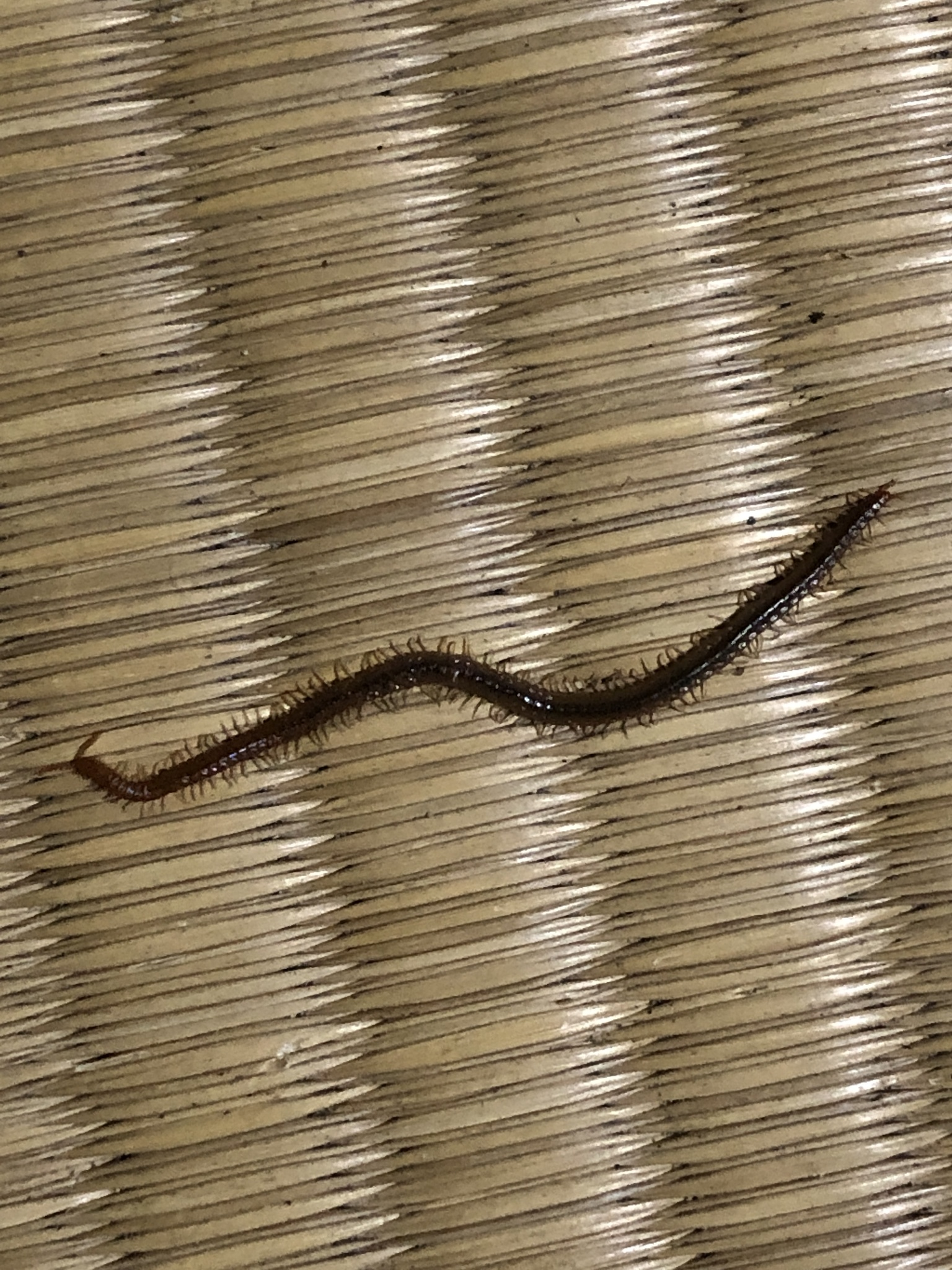
- Orphnaeus brevilabiatus

Scientific classification
- Kingdom: Animalia
- Phylum: Arthropoda
- Subphylum: Myriapoda
- Class: Chilopoda
- Order: Geophilomorpha
- Family: Oryidae
- Genus: Orphnaeus; Meinert, 1870

Type species
- Orphnaeus lividus Meinert,1870

Synonyms
- Andenophilus Verhoeff, 1941; Azygethus Chamberlin, 1920

= Orphnaeus =

Genus of centipedes

Orphnaeus is a genus of centipedes in the family Oryidae. This genus was described by Danish entomologist Frederik Vilhelm August Meinert in 1870. Centipedes in this genus are found in tropical regions.

== Description ==
Centipedes in this genus have short ultimate legs, range from 3 cm to 13 cm in length, and have 53 to 131 pairs of legs. The minimum number of legs in this genus (53 pairs) appears in the species Orphnaeus bevilabiatus; the maximum number (131 pairs) appears in the species O. madegassus.

== Species ==
There are 14 valid species:

- Orphnaeus atopus (Chamberlin, 1920)
- Orphnaeus bohlsi Attems, 1903
- Orphnaeus brasilianus (Humbert & Saussure, 1870)
- Orphnaeus brevilabiatus (Newport, 1845)
- Orphnaeus fangaroka Saussure & Zehntner L., 1902
- Orphnaeus guillemini (Gervais, 1847)
- Orphnaeus heteropodus Lawrence, 1963
- Orphnaeus maculatus Lawrence, 1960
- Orphnaeus madegassus Lawrence, 1960
- Orphnaeus meruinus Attems, 1909
- Orphnaeus multipes Manfredi, 1939
- Orphnaeus polypodus Silvestri, 1895
- Orphnaeus porosus Verhoeff K. W., 1937
- Orphnaeus validus Lawrence, 1953
