= Australiophilus ferrugineus =

Scientific classification
- Kingdom: Animalia
- Phylum: Arthropoda
- Subphylum: Myriapoda
- Class: Chilopoda
- Order: Geophilomorpha
- Family: Zelanophilidae
- Genus: Australiophilus
- Species: A. ferrugineus

Binomial name
- Australiophilus ferrugineus Hutton, 1877

Synonyms
- Geophilus huttoni Pocock,1891; Geophilus polyporus Haase,1887

Species of centipede

Australiophilus ferrugineus is a species of centipede in the Zelanophilidae family. It is endemic to New Zealand. It was first described in 1877 by New Zealand biologist Frederick Hutton. Since then, authorities have recognized two junior synonyms, deeming Geophilus huttoni a synonym in 1936 and Geophilus polyporus a synonym in 2014.

== Description ==
This species can have as few as 95 pairs of legs in males or as many as 109 leg pairs in females and can reach 120 mm in length, the maximum size recorded in the family Zelanophilidae.

== Distribution ==
The type locality is Wellington and Otago.
