= Gonibregmatus anguinus =

Scientific classification
- Kingdom: Animalia
- Phylum: Arthropoda
- Subphylum: Myriapoda
- Class: Chilopoda
- Order: Geophilomorpha
- Family: Gonibregmatidae
- Genus: Gonibregmatus
- Species: G. anguinus

Binomial name
- Gonibregmatus anguinus Pocock, 1899

Species of centipede

Gonibregmatus anguinus is a species of centipede in the Gonibregmatidae family. It was described in 1899 by British zoologist Reginald Innes Pocock. The original description reports that females of this species reach 130 mm in length with 129 pairs of legs whereas males range from 70 mm to 115 mm in length with 115 leg pairs. This species is yellowish brown with a bright red band on the head.

== Distribution ==
The species occurs in New Britain, Papua New Guinea.
