= Macronicophilus =

Scientific classification
- Kingdom: Animalia
- Phylum: Arthropoda
- Subphylum: Myriapoda
- Class: Chilopoda
- Order: Geophilomorpha
- Family: Geophilidae
- Genus: Macronicophilus; Silvestri, 1909

Type species
- Macronicophilus ortonedae Silvestri, 1909

Species
- Macronicophilus abbreviatus; Macronicophilus ortonedae; Macronicophilus unguiseta; Macronicophilus venezolanus

Genus of centipedes

Macronicophilus is a genus of soil centipedes in the family Geophilidae. This genus contains only four species. These centipedes exhibit traits so unusual that authorities once placed this genus in its own family, Macronicophilidae. In 2014, however, authorities deemed Macronicophilidae to be a junior synonym of Geophilidae, and references now place this genus in the family Geophilidae instead. These centipedes are found in the northern Andes and the Amazon basin in South America.

== Discovery and distribution ==
This genus was created by the Italian zoologist Filippo Silvestri in 1909 to contain the newly discovered type species M. ortonedae. He based the original description of this species on a sample of specimens including both sexes. These specimens were found in Naranjito, near Guayaquil, in Ecuador. In 1912, the French naturalist Henri Ribaut redescribed this species based on three male specimens found near Angelopolis in Colombia. This species has been recorded only at these two localities.

In 2000, the biologists Luis Alberto Pereira, Donatella Foddai, and Alessandro Minelli described three more species in this genus. They described M. abbreviatus based on an examination of a male holotype, a female allotype, and three other specimens (two females and one male). These specimens were collected from 1986 to 1991 at three different sites in the state of Amazonas in Brazil. This species has been recorded only at these three localities. The holotype and allotype are deposited in the lnstituto Nacional de Pesquisas da Amazonia in the city of Manaus in Brazil.

Pereira, Foddai, and Minelli described M. unguiseta based on a male holotype found in 1982 in the state of Amazonas in Brazil. This holotype is deposited in the lnstituto Nacional de Pesquisas da Amazonia. This species is known from only this holotype.

Pereira, Foddai, and Minelli described M. venezolanus based on an examination of a female holotype, a male allotype, and a juvenile specimen. These specimens were collected in 1987 from three different sites in Venezuela. The allotype is deposited in the Museo de La Plata in the city of La Plata in Argentina. In 2014 and 2015, nine specimens of Macronicophilus were collected near Icononzo in Colombia. In 2023, the biologists Lucio Bonato and Rodrigo Lopes Ferreira identified these nine specimens as M. venezolanus. This species is known only from the Venezuelan Coastal Range and the Colombian Andes.

== Taxonomy ==
Puzzled by the idiosyncratic traits observed in this genus, taxonomists struggled to the place this peculiar genus in the appropriate family. In 1909, Silvestri originally placed this genus in the small family Gonibregmatidae. Other authorities later placed this genus in the family Geophilidae instead. In 2000, Pereira, Foddai, and Minelli proposed a separate monotypic family Macronicophilidae to contain this genus, and authorities adopted this proposal. In 2014, however, a phylogenetic analysis of the order Geophilomorpha using both morphological and molecular data found a representative of this genus (M. venezolanus) nested within the family Geophilidae. To avoid paraphyly of the family Geophilidae with respect to Macronicophilidae, authorities dismissed Macronicophilidae as a separate family. Authorities now place the genus Macronicophilus in the family Geophilidae, but some references continue to place this genus in the family Macronicophilidae.

== Description ==
Centipedes in this genus feature a short head and antennae that are slightly attenuated. The pleurites on the sides of the head feature setae. The mandible features a pectinate lamella with a single row of less than 20 short teeth that are shaped like triangles. The telopodite of the first maxillae features a single article, with not only a lappet projecting from the lateral margin but also a second lappet projecting from the dorsal surface. The lappets of the coxosternite of the first maxillae are either absent or rudimentary.

The most unusual traits exhibited by this genus are found on the labrum and the telopodites of the second maxillae. The labrum features two rows of teeth, not only an external fringe of narrow teeth or bristles on the posterior margin but also a dorsal series of small internal teeth. Furthermore, the lateral parts of the labrum are unusually elongated. Moreover, each telopodite of the second maxillae features an additional (fourth) article that is swollen, rounded, and covered with small scales or spines, but lacks a claw at the distal end. The coxosternite of the second maxillae is not divided by a longitudinal furrow down the middle.

The forcipular coxosternite is short and lacks denticles or chitin lines, and the forcipules are also short and lack denticles. The ultimate article of the forcipule is relatively elongated. The sternites feature pores arranged in a single large field in the posterior part of each segment. The basal element of each of the ultimate legs (coxopleuron) features numerous pores that open separately and are scattered over almost the entire surface. Each of the ultimate legs features only five articles (instead of the usual six articles) plus a claw at the distal end. The telson features anal pores.

Species in this genus range in size from M. abbreviatus, which reaches only 16 mm in length, to M. venezolanus, which can reach 32 mm in length. The smallest species M. abbreviatus also features the fewest legs, with only 39 pairs in males and 41 pairs in females. The two largest species, M. venezolanus and M. ortonedae, can have as many as 61 leg pairs, which is the maximum number of legs recorded in this genus.

== Phylogeny ==
In 2023, a phylogenetic analysis of the family Geophilidae based on morphology confirmed the monophyly of the genus Macronicophilus, placing all four species together in a clade in a phylogenetic tree of this family. These four species also formed a sister group for the newly described monotypic genus Plutogeophilus, which emerged as the genus most closely related to Macronicophilus in this analysis. In 2014, phylogenetic analysis using both morphology and molecular evidence placed M. venezolanus in a clade with a representative of the genus Eurygeophilus. The results of these studies suggest that after the genus Plutogeophilus, the genus Eurygeophilus may be the next closest relative of the genus Macronicophilus.

The genus Macronicophilus shares many traits with other centipedes in the family Geophilidae. For example, like other geophilids, Macronicophilus features mandibles that each bear a single pectinate lamella and a labrum with a fringe of bristles. Furthermore, as is common among geophilids, the coxosternite of the second maxillae in Macronicophilus is undivided, and the sternites of the leg-bearing segments feature pores.

The genus Macronicophilus shares a more distinctive set of traits with its close relative Plutogeophilus, which is found in Brazil. For example, in both of these genera, the main sternite (metasternite) of the ultimate leg-bearing segment is unusually longer than wide, small relative to the penultimate metasternite, and narrow relative to the coxopleura. Furthermore, these two genera exhibit a unique sexual dimorphism in the shape of this metasternite, with the anterior part of this metasternite broader in the male than in the female. Moreover, in both genera, the forcipular coxosternite is short, the ultimate article of the forcipule is elongated, pore fields appear on the sternites from the first to the penultimate leg-bearing segments, and unusually numerous pores are scattered uniformly on the ventral, lateral, and dorsal surface of each coxopleuron.

Species of Macronicophilus can be distinguished from centipedes in the genus Plutogeophilus, however, based on many other traits. For example, the second maxillae in Macronicophilus features a swollen spinous fourth article where Plutogeophilus (like other geophilids) instead features a claw. Furthermore, the labrum is elongated in Macronicophilus (with a width/length ratio ranging from 1.4 to 1.7) compared to the labrum in Plutogeophilus (with a width/length ratio of 3) or in other geophilids (with a width/length ratio in the range of 2 to 4). Moreover, the forcipular coxosternite features a pair of chitin lines in Plutogeophilus (and in most geophilids) but not in Macronicophilus, and the ultimate legs feature only five articles in Macronicophilus where Plutogeophilus and most geophilids feature six articles.

== Species ==
This genus includes four species:

- Macronicophilus abbreviatus Pereira, Foddai & Minelli, 2000
- Macronicophilus ortonedae Silvestri, 1909
- Macronicophilus unguiseta Pereira, Foddai & Minelli, 2000
- Macronicophilus venezolanus Pereira, Foddai & Minelli, 2000
