= Macronicophilus abbreviatus =

Scientific classification
- Kingdom: Animalia
- Phylum: Arthropoda
- Subphylum: Myriapoda
- Class: Chilopoda
- Order: Geophilomorpha
- Family: Geophilidae
- Genus: Macronicophilus
- Species: M. abbreviatus

Binomial name
- Macronicophilus abbreviatus Pereira, Foddai & Minelli, 2000

Species of centipede

Macronicophilus abbreviatus is a species of soil centipede in the family Geophildae. This centipede is found in Brazil. This species is notable for its small size, reaching only 16 mm in length, and modest number of legs, with only 39 pairs in males and 41 pairs in females, the minimum numbers recorded in the genus Macronicophilus.

== Discovery and etymology ==
This species was first described in 2000 by the biologists Luis Alberto Pereira, Donatella Foddai, and Alessandro Minelli. They based the original description of this species on an examination of a male holotype, a female allotype, and three other specimens (two females and one male). These specimens were collected from 1986 to 1991 at three different sites in the state of Amazonas in Brazil. The holotype and allotype are deposited in the lnstituto Nacional de Pesquisas da Amazonia in the city of Manaus in Brazil. Another female specimen is deposited in the Museo de La Plata in the city of La Plata in Argentina. The species name refers to the modest number of trunk segments found in this centipede.

== Distribution and habitat ==
This species is known only from the state of Amazonas in Brazil. Most specimens, including the holotype and allotype, were collected from a primary white-sand forest (campinarana). Other specimens were found in secondary upland forests.

== Description ==
This species can reach 16 mm in length and 0.9 mm in width. Males of this species feature 39 pairs of legs, whereas females feature 41 leg pairs. Specimens preserved in alcohol are a pale shade of ochre. Each antenna is about 3.1 times as long as the dorsal plate on the head, which is only slightly longer than wide, with a length/width ratio of only 1.1. The entire surface of the clypeus is reticulated but features a small spot near the anterior margin in the middle (clypeal area) on a small round prominence with a granular surface. The labrum features a fringe of about 32 teeth on the posterior margin and a second series of about 60 small teeth on the internal (dorsal) side. The side pieces of the labrum are elongated, with a width/length ratio ranging from 1.4 to 1.5. The pleurites on the sides of the head feature setae. The mandible features a pectinate lamella with about 13 short hyaline teeth, each less than four times as long as wide.

Well developed lappets project from each telopodite of the first maxillae, but no lappets appear on the coxosternite. Each of the second maxillae ends in a spiny rounded article instead of a claw. When closed, the forcipules do not extend beyond the front of the head, and each article lacks teeth. The exposed part of the forcipular coxosternite is short, with a width/length ratio of 2.1, and the coxosternite lacks chitin lines. The first article of the forcipule is short, with a length/width ratio of 0.8, but the ultimate article is 2.2 times as long as the first article. The poison calyx in the forcipule is moderately elongate, reaching inside the first article.

Fields of pores appear on sternites from the first to the penultimate trunk segments. All pore fields are undivided, and the anterior margin of this field changes along the trunk from straight on the anterior sternites to convex on the posterior sternites. The sternite of the last leg-bearing segment is as long as wide in the male but markedly narrower in the female, with a length/width ratio of 1.6. The basal element of each of the ultimate legs (coxopleuron) features about nine pores opening separately and scattered over the entire surface. Each of the ultimate legs features five articles plus a claw. The ultimate legs are swollen in the male but not in the female, and the ventral surface of these legs is covered with dense setae in the male but not in the female. The telson features anal pores.

This species exhibits many traits that characterize the genus Macronicophilus. For example, as in other species in this genus, the head in this species is short, the mandible features a pectinate lamella with a single row of short teeth, lappets project from the telopodites of the first maxillae, each of the second maxillae features a fourth article but no claw at the distal end, the coxosternite of the second maxillae is not divided down the middle by a longitudinal furrow, the forcipular coxosternite is short and lacks chitin lines, pore fields appear on the posterior part of the sternites, pores are scattered over almost the entire surface of the coxopleura, and the forcipules are short and lack denticles, but the ultimate article of the forcipule is elongated. Furthermore, as in other species in this genus, each of the ultimate legs features only five articles plus a claw, and the labrum in this species is elongated and features not only a fringe of external teeth on the posterior margin but also a second row of internal teeth on the dorsal side.

This species can be distinguished from all other species of Macronicophilus, however, based on other traits. For example, this species features no more than 41 leg pairs, whereas the other species in this genus feature at least 53 leg pairs. Furthermore, the ultimate legs in the male are distinctly swollen and feature dense setae in this species but not in any other species of Macronicophilus. Moreover, the ultimate article of the forcipule is distinctly flat in all other species in this genus but not flattened in this species.
