= Zelanophilus =

Scientific classification
- Kingdom: Animalia
- Phylum: Arthropoda
- Subphylum: Myriapoda
- Class: Chilopoda
- Order: Geophilomorpha
- Family: Zelanophilidae
- Genus: Zelanophilus; Chamberlin, 1920

Type species
- Zelanophilus wheeleri Chamberlin, 1920

Genus of centipedes

Zelanophilus is a genus of three species of centipedes, in the family Zelanophilidae. This genus was described by American biologist Ralph Vary Chamberlin in 1920. Centipedes in this genus are found in Australia and New Zealand.

== Description ==
Centipedes in this genus feature forcipules without denticles, anterior trunk metasternites with a single posterior pore-field, and coxopleura with many scattered pores; the lateral parts of the labrum almost touch medially, with the intermediate part inconspicuous, and the female gonopods are distinct and biarticulate. These centipedes range from 4 cm to 7 cm in length and have 59 to 77 pairs of legs.

== Species ==
Valid species:

- Zelanophilus kapiti Archey, 1922
- Zelanophilus pococki Crabill, 1963
- Zelanophilus provocator (Pocock, 1891)
