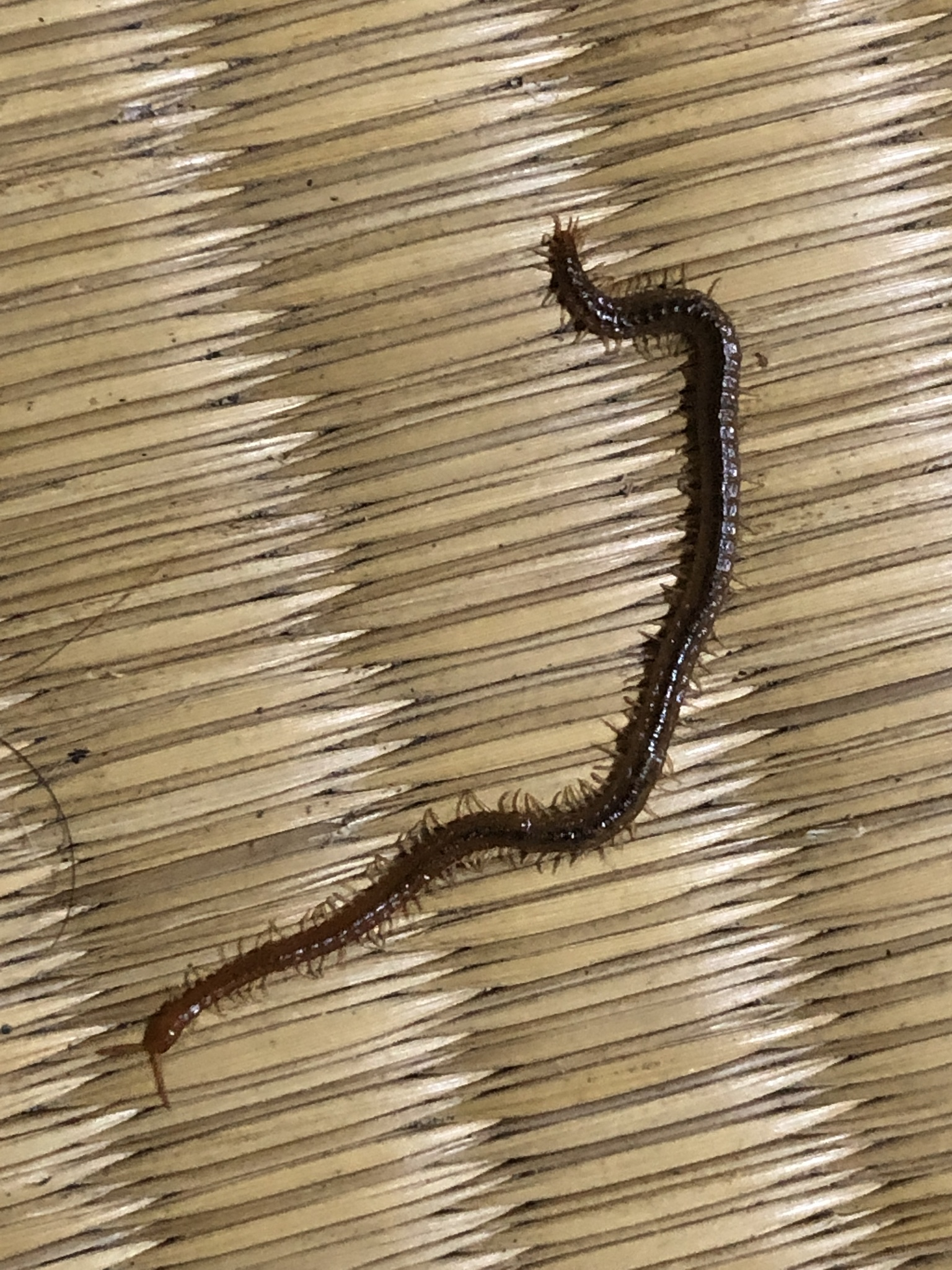

Scientific classification
- Kingdom: Animalia
- Phylum: Arthropoda
- Subphylum: Myriapoda
- Class: Chilopoda
- Order: Geophilomorpha
- Family: Oryidae
- Genus: Orphnaeus
- Species: O. brevilabiatus

Binomial name
- Orphnaeus brevilabiatus (Newport, 1845)

Synonyms
- Geophilus bilineatus Peters, 1855; Orphnaeus lividus Meinert, 1870; Scolopendra phosphoreus Linnaeus, 1758; Orya xanti Tömösváry, 1885; Orphaneous brevilabiatus Anderson, 1980; Orphaneus brevilabiatus Haneda,1939; Orphanaeus brevilabiatus Yatsu, 1912; Orphaneous brevilabiatus Anderson, 1980

= Orphnaeus brevilabiatus =

Species of centipede

Orphnaeus brevilabiatus is a species of centipede in the family Oryidae.

== Description ==
Adult specimens are typically 60–65 mm long, yellowish-orange in colour and ca. 1 mm wide at the head. Females can have from 73 to 85 pairs of legs, whereas males can have from 67 to 77 pairs, most often 73 pairs. A specimen from Madagascar with even fewer legs (53 pairs, sex not reported) features the minimum number recorded in the family Orydae.

== Distribution ==
It is a littoral myriapod that can be found throughout sublittoral zones of Indian and East Pacific countries, including Taiwan and Japan, in particular the Okinawan, Yaeyama and Miyama islands, where it is listed as a threatened local population. It has been introduced to south-west Western Australia.

== Biology ==
The species is one of several bioluminescent centipede genera currently known. Upon direct chemical, thermal and physical stimulation, the centipede secretes a clear, but bioluminescent slime from pores in its sternal defense glands, supposedly a form of aposematism. While several genera display this form of bioluminescence, utilising the typical oxygen-dependent luciferin-luciferase reaction, this example is noteworthy due to the low, narrow pH range of the reaction, and the relatively long period of emission.
