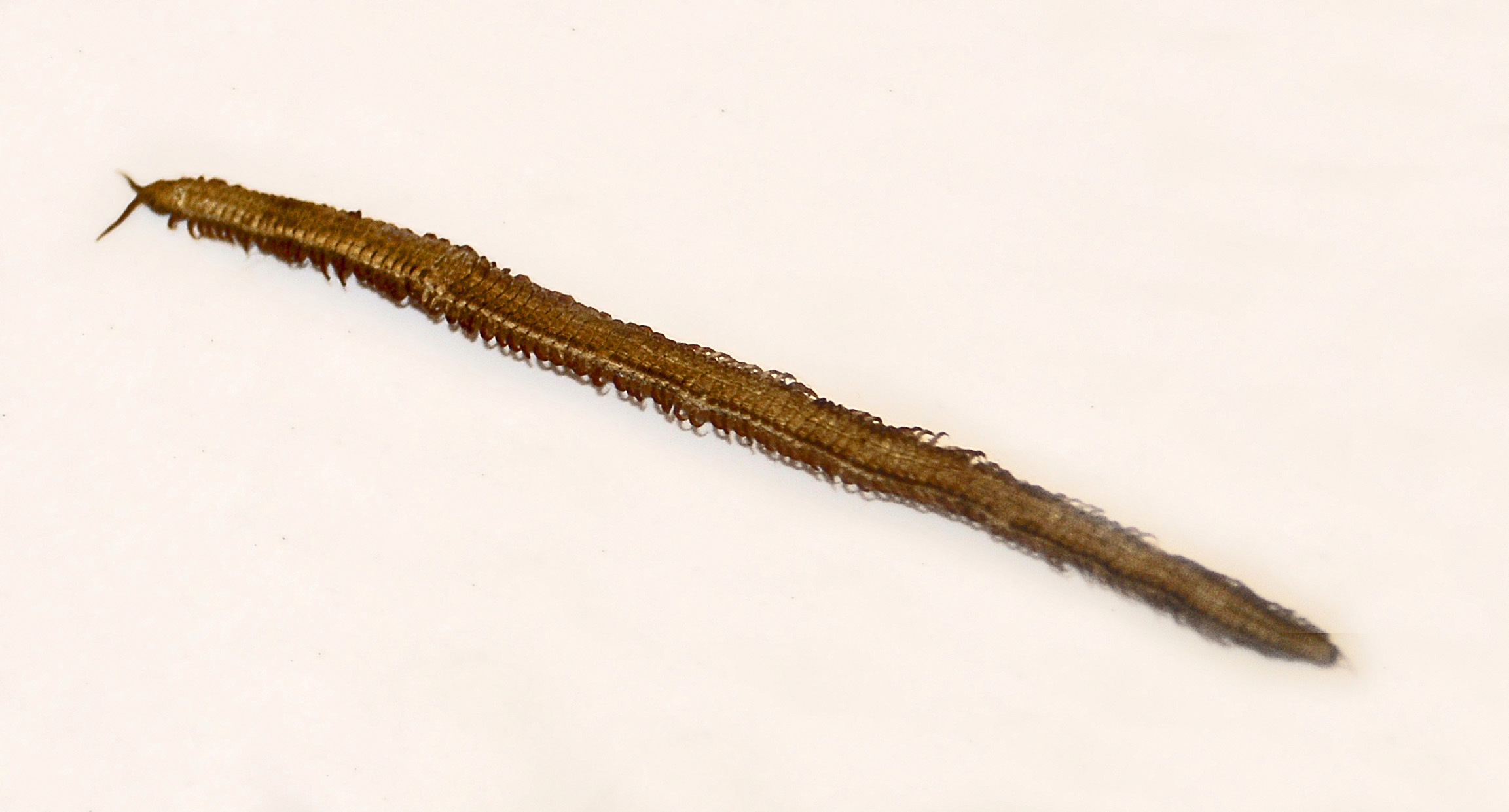
- Orya barbarica

Scientific classification
- Kingdom: Animalia
- Phylum: Arthropoda
- Subphylum: Myriapoda
- Class: Chilopoda
- Order: Geophilomorpha
- Suborder: Adesmata
- Superfamily: Himantarioidea
- Family: Oryidae; Cook, 1896

= Oryidae =

Family of centipedes

Oryidae is a monophyletic family of soil centipedes belonging to the superfamily Himantarioidea.

== Description ==
Centipedes in this family feature a short head, stout antennae, mandibles with a series of pectinate lamellae, a slightly concave labral margin with a row of denticles or bristles, first maxillae with one article on each telopodite, and claws on the second maxillae fringed by two rows of filaments. The coxosternite and forcipules are short without denticles, and the forcipular segment is stout with a wide tergite. Sternal pores are mainly clustered as two pairs of groups, the ultimate legs usually have no pretarsus, and the female gonopods are distinct and usually biarticulate.

These centipedes are very elongated with a high mean number of trunk segments (often greater than 100) and great variability in this number within species. The number of leg-bearing segments in this family varies within as well as among species and ranges from 53 to 169. The minimum number of legs recorded in this family (53 pairs) appears in the species Orphnaeus brevilabiatus; the maximum number (169 pairs) appears in the species Titanophilus maximus.

== Distribution ==
Centipedes in this family are found in tropical and subtropical regions of the Americas, Africa, Madagascar, south Asia, Australia, and some Pacific islands.

== Genera ==
This family contains the following genera:

- Aspidopleres
- Chamberlinia
- Ctenorya
- Diphtherogaster
- Endoptelus
- Heniorya
- Lamotteophilus
- Marshallopus
- Metaxythus
- Notiphilides
- Nycternyssa
- Orphnaeus
- Orya
- Parorya
- Pentorya
- Stenorya
- Titanophilus
- Trematorya
