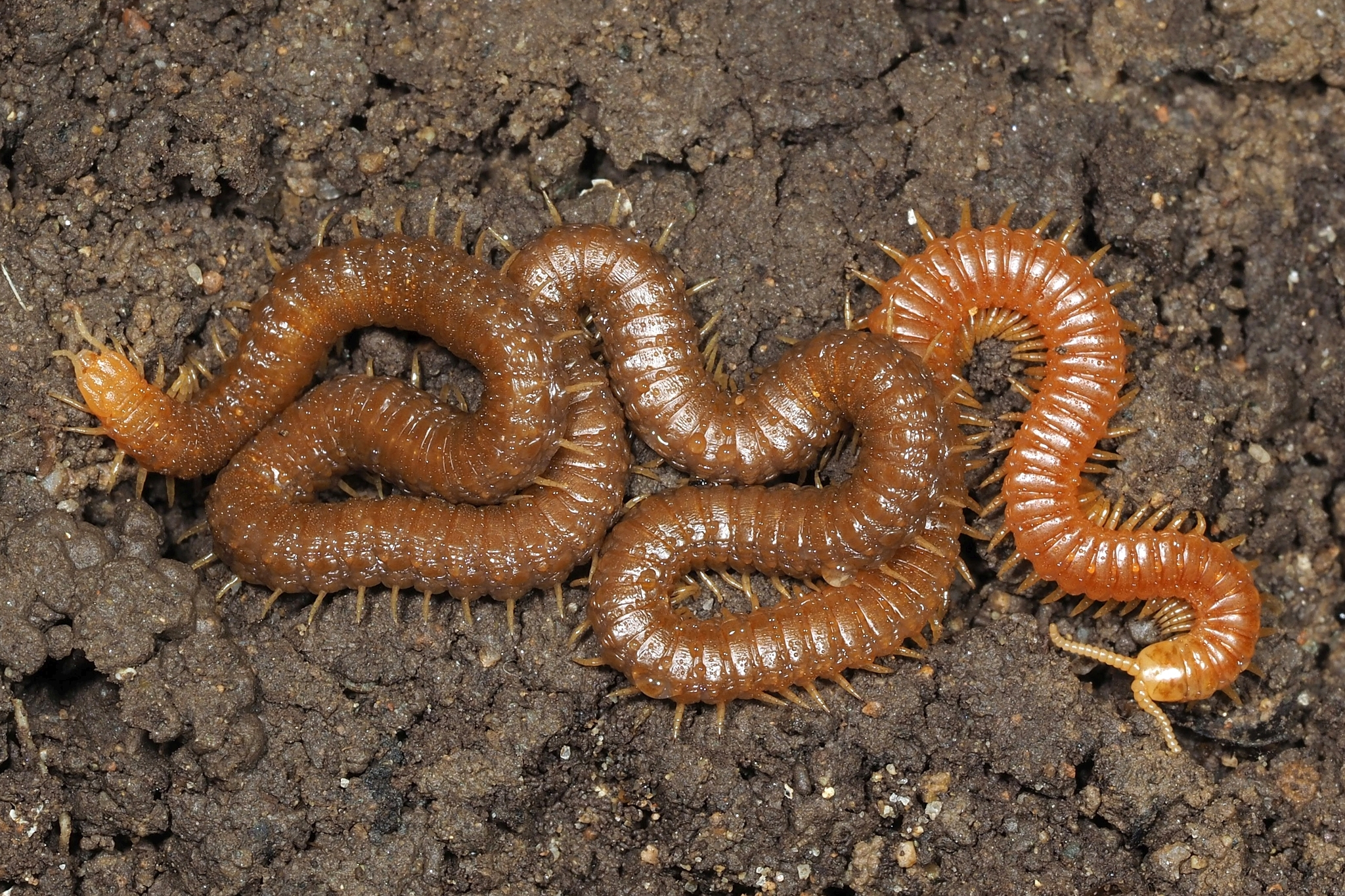
- Hi. gabrielis

Scientific classification
- Kingdom: Animalia
- Phylum: Arthropoda
- Subphylum: Myriapoda
- Class: Chilopoda
- Order: Geophilomorpha
- Family: Himantariidae
- Genus: Himantarium
- Species: H. gabrielis

Binomial name
- Himantarium gabrielis (Linnaeus, 1767)

Synonyms
- Himantarium algericus (Brandt,1841); Himantarium ambiguus( Brandt J.F., 1841); Himantarium broelemanni (Léger & Duboscq, 1903); Himantarium dubius (Brandt ,1841); Himantarium hispanicum (Meinert, 1870 ); Himantarium hova (Saussure & Zehntner,1902); Himantarium laevigatus (Brullé, 1832); Himantarium lefevrei ( Lucas in Guérin-Méneville, 1840); Himantarium longissimus (Risso ,1826); Himantarium rubrovittatus (Lucas ,1846); Himantarium rugulosus (C.L.Koch ,1841); Himantarium savignyanus (Gervais ,1837); Himantarium semipedalis (Dufour,1820); Himantarium sulcatus (Brullé, 1832); Himantarium viridipes (Brandt ,1841); Himantarium walckenaeri (Gervais, 1835); Himantarium xanthinus (Newport, 1845)

= Himantarium gabrielis =

Species of centipede

Himantarium gabrielis is a species of centipede in the family Himantariidae.

== Description ==
Himantarium gabrielis can reach a length around 13–22 cm (5.1–8.7 in). The head is small and lacks eyes, but has two tentacles with 14 segments. On the dorsal side of the last trunk segment are longitudinal and transversal wide sulci resembling a cross. The body is yellowish to orange in colour with a pinkish/red stripe on the lower side and has up to 179 segments, with a pair of legs each. The number of legs is very variable, usually leg-bearing segments vary from 87 to 171 in males and from 95 to 179 in females.

When disturbed, this species emits viscous and proteinaceous secretions from the sternal glands. It feeds on various invertebrates. It can be found under stones or in galleries into the ground. The females protect their eggs with the body until the hatching of their young.

== Distribution ==
This species is widely distributed in the Mediterranean region. It can be found in Albania, Bosnia, Bulgaria, Croatia, France, Greece, Italy, North Macedonia, Portugal, Romania, Slovenia, and Switzerland.
