= Neogeophilidae =

Scientific classification
- Domain: Eukaryota
- Kingdom: Animalia
- Phylum: Arthropoda
- Subphylum: Myriapoda
- Class: Chilopoda
- Order: Geophilomorpha
- Family: Neogeophilidae

Family of centipedes

Neogeophilidae is a family of centipedes belonging to the order Geophilomorpha.

Genera:

- Evallogeophilus Silvestri, 1918
- Neogeophilus Silvestri, 1918
