= Gonibregmatidae =

Scientific classification
- Kingdom: Animalia
- Phylum: Arthropoda
- Subphylum: Myriapoda
- Class: Chilopoda
- Order: Geophilomorpha
- Suborder: Adesmata
- Superfamily: Geophiloidea
- Family: Gonibregmatidae; Cook, 1896

Family of centipedes

Gonibregmatidae is a family of soil centipedes belonging to the superfamily Geophiloidea. In 2014, a phylogenetic analysis based on morphological and molecular data found this family to be paraphyletic with respect to the families Neogeophilidae and Eriphantidae, which authorities now deem to be junior synonyms for Gonibregmatidae. This family now includes more than 20 species in at least 10 genera.

== Description ==
Centipedes in this family feature a short head and mandibles with a single row of short teeth. The number of leg-bearing segments in this family varies within as well as among species and ranges from 57 to 191. These centipedes are very elongated with a high mean number of trunk segments (often greater than 100) and great variability in this number within species. The minimum number of legs recorded in this family (57 pairs) appears in the species Himantosoma porosum. This family includes the species Gonibregmatus plurimipes, which can have as many as 191 leg pairs, the maximum number recorded in the class Chilopoda.

== Distribution ==
Centipedes in this family are found in Madagascar, India, southeast Asia, and Australasia, and on islands in the Pacific Ocean. Species from the families Neogeophilidae and Eriphantidae are found in Central America and Mexico.

== Genera ==
This family includes the following genera:

- Dschangelophilus Verhoeff, 1937
- Eriphantes Crabill, 1970
- Eucratonyx Pocock, 1898
- Evallogeophilus Silvestri, 1918
- Geoporophilus Silvestri, 1919
- Gonibregmatus Newport, 1843
- Himantosoma Pocock, 1891
- Neogeophilus Silvestri, 1918
- Sogophagus Chamberlin, 1912
- Tweediphilus Verhoeff, 1937
