= Zelanophilidae =

Scientific classification
- Kingdom: Animalia
- Phylum: Arthropoda
- Subphylum: Myriapoda
- Class: Chilopoda
- Order: Geophilomorpha
- Suborder: Adesmata
- Superfamily: Geophiloidea
- Family: Zelanophilidae; Bonato, Drago and Murienne, 2014

Family of centipedes

Zelanophilidae is a family of centipedes belonging to the order Geophilomorpha and superfamily Geophiloidea. Centipedes in this family are found in the Australasian region. This family includes seven species distributed among three genera.

== Description ==
These centipedes feature a slightly elongated head, elongated antennae that gradually taper, a clypeus with many setae on the anterior part, a labral posterior margin fringed with slender projections, a mandible with a single pectinate lamella, glandular pores present on the trunk metasternites in both sexes, many scattered pores on most sides of the coxopleura, and slender ultimate legs with claws. The female gonopods are separate and bi-articulate. The number of legs vary within as well as among species.

The smallest species in this family, Tasmanophilus spenceri, measures only 23 mm in length and has only 39 pairs of legs, the minimum number recorded in this family. The largest species in this family, Australiophilus ferrugineus, can reach 120 mm in length and can have as many as 109 leg pairs. The species Australiophilus longissimus can reach 72 mm in length and can have as many as 117 leg pairs, the maximum number recorded in this family.

== Genera ==
This family includes the following genera:

- Australiophilus Verhoeff, 1925
- Tasmanophilus Chamberlin, 1920
- Zelanophilus Chamberlin, 1920
