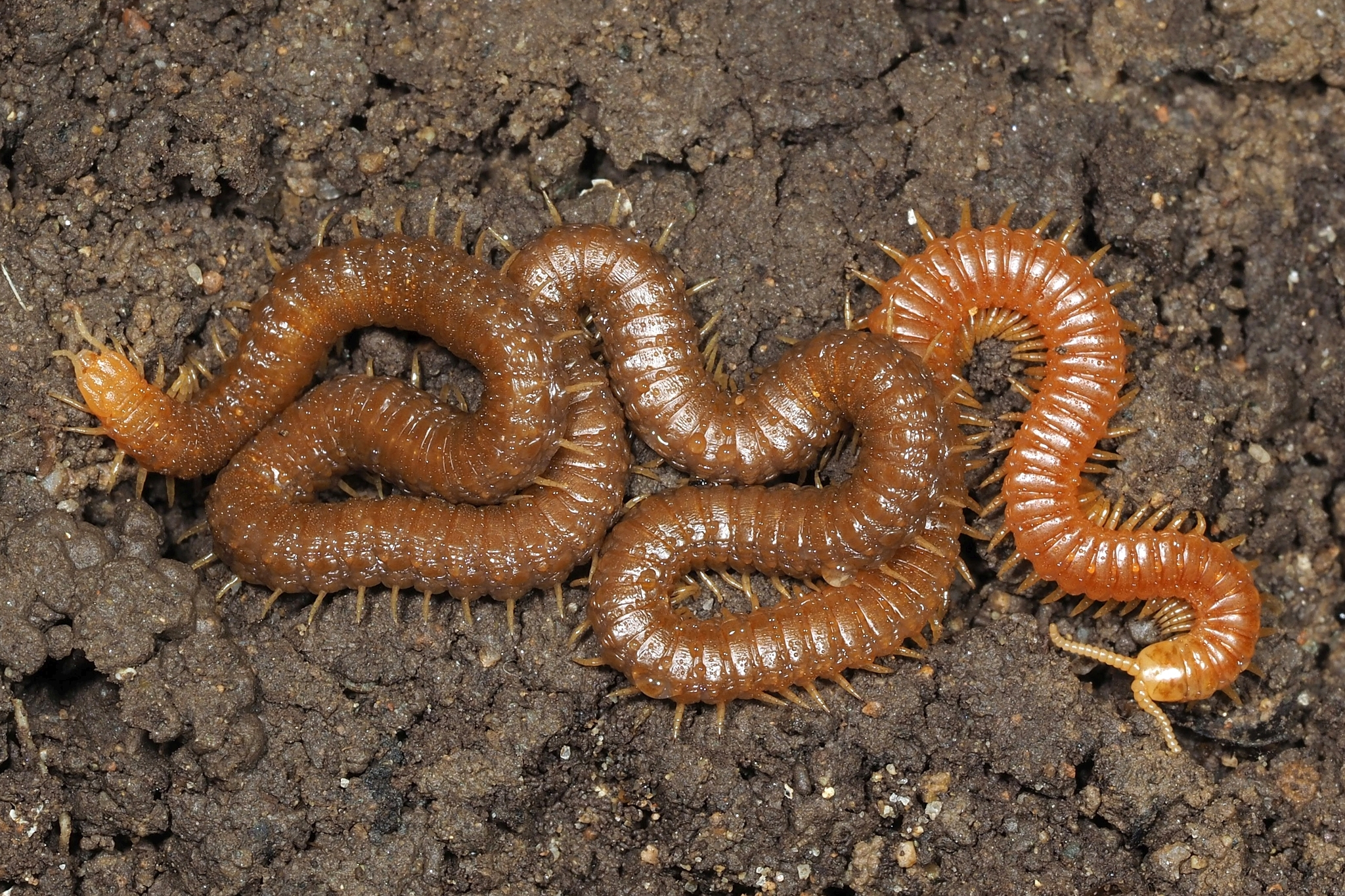
- Himantarium gabrielis

Scientific classification
- Domain: Eukaryota
- Kingdom: Animalia
- Phylum: Arthropoda
- Subphylum: Myriapoda
- Class: Chilopoda
- Order: Geophilomorpha
- Suborder: Adesmata

Superfamilies
- Geophiloidea Leach, 1815; Himantarioidea Bollman, 1893

= Adesmata =

Adesmata Temporal range: 155.7–Present Ma

Centipede suborder

Adesmata is a suborder of centipedes within the order Geophilomorpha containing the superfamilies Geophiloidea and Himantarioidea. This suborder contains 13 families. All members of this suborder have ventral defensive glands.

== Description ==
Species of the suborder Adesmata are characterized by a labrum without a separate intermediate tooth, the lateral parts fringed by projections; coxal projections and telopodites of the first maxillae possessing subapical spine-sensilla and apical scutefilaments; telopodites of the second maxillae short compared to the coxosternite width; forcipular coxosternite with chitin-lines; glands along the trunk opening in ventral pore-fields; and a variable number of legs between conspecific specimens. However, there are reversals within the suborder and most autapomorphies evolved in parallel to other centipedes.
