= Paralamyctes halli =

Scientific classification
- Kingdom: Animalia
- Phylum: Arthropoda
- Subphylum: Myriapoda
- Class: Chilopoda
- Order: Lithobiomorpha
- Family: Henicopidae
- Genus: Paralamyctes
- Species: P. halli

Binomial name
- Paralamyctes halli (Archey, 1917)

Synonyms
- Wailamyctes halli Archey, 1917

Species of centipede

Paralamyctes halli is a species of centipede in the Henicopidae family. It is endemic to New Zealand. It was first described in 1917 by New Zealand zoologist Gilbert Archey.

== Distribution ==
The species occurs on the South Island. The type locality is Rakaia Gorge, on the Rakaia River in the Canterbury Region.
