= Paralamyctes subicolus =

Scientific classification
- Kingdom: Animalia
- Phylum: Arthropoda
- Subphylum: Myriapoda
- Class: Chilopoda
- Order: Lithobiomorpha
- Family: Henicopidae
- Genus: Paralamyctes
- Species: P. subicolus

Binomial name
- Paralamyctes subicolus Edgecombe, 2004

Species of centipede

Paralamyctes subicolus is a species of centipede in the Henicopidae family. It is endemic to Australia. It was first described in 2004 by palaeontologist Gregory Edgecombe.

== Distribution ==
The species occurs only in the Australian island state of Tasmania. The type locality is Stephens Rivulet, a tributary of the Arthur River, near Trowutta in North West Tasmania.

== Behaviour ==
The centipedes are solitary terrestrial predators that inhabit plant litter and soil.
