= Paralamyctes cammooensis =

Scientific classification
- Kingdom: Animalia
- Phylum: Arthropoda
- Subphylum: Myriapoda
- Class: Chilopoda
- Order: Lithobiomorpha
- Family: Henicopidae
- Genus: Paralamyctes
- Species: P. cammooensis

Binomial name
- Paralamyctes cammooensis Edgecombe, 2004

Species of centipede

Paralamyctes cammooensis is a species of centipede in the Henicopidae family. It was first described in 2004 by palaeontologist Gregory Edgecombe.

== Distribution ==
The species occurs in coastal eastern Australia in Queensland and New South Wales. The type locality is Cammoo Caves, Mount Etna Caves National Park, near Rockhampton in Central Queensland.

== Behaviour ==
The centipedes are solitary terrestrial predators that inhabit plant litter and soil.
