= Paralamyctes harrisi =

Scientific classification
- Kingdom: Animalia
- Phylum: Arthropoda
- Subphylum: Myriapoda
- Class: Chilopoda
- Order: Lithobiomorpha
- Family: Henicopidae
- Genus: Paralamyctes
- Species: P. harrisi

Binomial name
- Paralamyctes harrisi Archey, 1922

Species of centipede

Paralamyctes harrisi is a species of centipede in the Henicopidae family. It is endemic to New Zealand. It was first described in 1922 by New Zealand zoologist Gilbert Archey.

== Distribution ==
The species occurs on North Island. The type localities are Taumarunui, and Tokatea Ridge on the Coromandel Peninsula.
