= Henicops howensis =

Scientific classification
- Kingdom: Animalia
- Phylum: Arthropoda
- Subphylum: Myriapoda
- Class: Chilopoda
- Order: Lithobiomorpha
- Family: Henicopidae
- Genus: Henicops
- Species: H. howensis

Binomial name
- Henicops howensis Edgecombe, 2004
- Location of Lord Howe Island

Species of centipede

Henicops howensis is a species of centipede in the Henicopidae family. It is endemic to Australia. It was first described in 2004 by Gregory Edgecombe.

== Distribution ==
The species occurs only on New South Wales’ Lord Howe Island in the Tasman Sea.
