= Paralamyctes monteithi =

Scientific classification
- Kingdom: Animalia
- Phylum: Arthropoda
- Subphylum: Myriapoda
- Class: Chilopoda
- Order: Lithobiomorpha
- Family: Henicopidae
- Genus: Paralamyctes
- Species: P. monteithi

Binomial name
- Paralamyctes monteithi Edgecombe, 2001

Species of centipede

Paralamyctes monteithi is a species of centipede in the Henicopidae family. It is endemic to Australia. It was first described in 2001 by palaeontologist Gregory Edgecombe.

== Distribution ==
The species occurs in north-east Queensland. The type locality is the south end of the Bluewater Range, some 45 km north-west of Townsville.

== Behaviour ==
The centipedes are solitary terrestrial predators that inhabit plant litter and soil.
