= Paralamyctes rahuensis =

Scientific classification
- Kingdom: Animalia
- Phylum: Arthropoda
- Subphylum: Myriapoda
- Class: Chilopoda
- Order: Lithobiomorpha
- Family: Henicopidae
- Genus: Paralamyctes
- Species: P. rahuensis

Binomial name
- Paralamyctes rahuensis Edgecombe, 2004

Species of centipede

Paralamyctes rahuensis is a species of centipede in the Henicopidae family. It is endemic to New Zealand. It was first described in 2004 by palaeontologist Gregory Edgecombe.

== Distribution ==
The species occurs on South Island. The type locality is Rahu Scenic Reserve near Springs Junction.
