= Henicops washpoolensis =

Scientific classification
- Kingdom: Animalia
- Phylum: Arthropoda
- Subphylum: Myriapoda
- Class: Chilopoda
- Order: Lithobiomorpha
- Family: Henicopidae
- Genus: Henicops
- Species: H. washpoolensis

Binomial name
- Henicops washpoolensis Edgecombe & Hollington, 2005

Species of centipede

Henicops washpoolensis is a species of centipede in the Henicopidae family. It is endemic to Australia. It was first described in 2005 by Gregory Edgecombe and Lauren Hollington.

== Distribution ==
The species occurs in New South Wales and Queensland. The type locality is the Washpool State Forest in north-eastern New South Wales.
