= Easonobius tridentatus =

Scientific classification
- Kingdom: Animalia
- Phylum: Arthropoda
- Subphylum: Myriapoda
- Class: Chilopoda
- Order: Lithobiomorpha
- Family: Henicopidae
- Genus: Easonobius
- Species: E. tridentatus

Binomial name
- Easonobius tridentatus Edgecombe, 2003

Species of centipede

Easonobius tridentatus is a species of centipede in the Henicopidae family. It is endemic to New Caledonia, a French overseas territory in Melanesia. It was first described in 2003 by palaeontologist Gregory Edgecombe.

== Distribution ==
The species occurs on the main island of Grande Terre. The type locality is Pic d'Amoa, in the commune of Poindimié.
