= Henicops milledgei =

Scientific classification
- Kingdom: Animalia
- Phylum: Arthropoda
- Subphylum: Myriapoda
- Class: Chilopoda
- Order: Lithobiomorpha
- Family: Henicopidae
- Genus: Henicops
- Species: H. milledgei

Binomial name
- Henicops milledgei Hollington & Edgecombe, 2004

Species of centipede

Henicops milledgei is a species of centipede in the Henicopidae family. It is endemic to Australia. It was first described in 2004 by Lauren Hollington and Gregory Edgecombe.

== Distribution ==
The species occurs in Victoria, south-eastern Australia. The type locality is the Tarra-Bulga National Park, in the Strzelecki Ranges of South Gippsland.

== Behaviour ==
The centipedes are solitary terrestrial predators that inhabit plant litter and soil.
