= Paralamyctes trailli =

Scientific classification
- Kingdom: Animalia
- Phylum: Arthropoda
- Subphylum: Myriapoda
- Class: Chilopoda
- Order: Lithobiomorpha
- Family: Henicopidae
- Genus: Paralamyctes
- Species: P. trailli

Binomial name
- Paralamyctes trailli (Archey, 1917)

Synonyms
- Wailamyctes trailli Archey, 1917

Species of centipede

Paralamyctes trailli is a species of centipede in the Henicopidae family. It is endemic to New Zealand. It was first described in 1917 by New Zealand zoologist Gilbert Archey.

== Distribution ==
Type localities are Stewart Island, and Waipara in the Canterbury Region.
