= Paralamyctes validus =

Scientific classification
- Kingdom: Animalia
- Phylum: Arthropoda
- Subphylum: Myriapoda
- Class: Chilopoda
- Order: Lithobiomorpha
- Family: Henicopidae
- Genus: Paralamyctes
- Species: P. validus

Binomial name
- Paralamyctes validus Archey, 1917

Synonyms
- Paralamyctes dubius Archey, 1917

Species of centipede

Paralamyctes validus is a species of centipede in the Henicopidae family. It is endemic to New Zealand. It was first described in 1917 by New Zealand zoologist Gilbert Archey.

== Distribution ==
The species occurs on North Island. The type locality is Ohakune, near Mount Ruapehu.
