= Lamyctes oticus =

Scientific classification
- Kingdom: Animalia
- Phylum: Arthropoda
- Subphylum: Myriapoda
- Class: Chilopoda
- Order: Lithobiomorpha
- Family: Henicopidae
- Genus: Lamyctes
- Species: L. oticus

Binomial name
- Lamyctes oticus Archey, 1921

Species of centipede

Lamyctes oticus is a species of centipede in the Henicopidae family. It is endemic to New Zealand. It was first described in 1921 by New Zealand zoologist Gilbert Archey.

== Distribution ==
The species occurs in the South Island. The type locality is Otekaike in North Otago.
