= Henicops tropicanus =

Scientific classification
- Kingdom: Animalia
- Phylum: Arthropoda
- Subphylum: Myriapoda
- Class: Chilopoda
- Order: Lithobiomorpha
- Family: Henicopidae
- Genus: Henicops
- Species: H. tropicanus

Binomial name
- Henicops tropicanus Hollington & Edgecombe, 2004

Species of centipede

Henicops tropicanus is a species of centipede in the Henicopidae family. It is endemic to Australia. It was first described in 2004 by Lauren Hollington and Gregory Edgecombe.

== Distribution ==
The species occurs in the Wet Tropics of north-eastern Queensland. The type locality is the head of Roots Creek, near Mossman.

== Behaviour ==
The centipedes are solitary terrestrial predators that inhabit plant litter and soil.
