= Paralamyctes grayi =

Scientific classification
- Kingdom: Animalia
- Phylum: Arthropoda
- Subphylum: Myriapoda
- Class: Chilopoda
- Order: Lithobiomorpha
- Family: Henicopidae
- Genus: Paralamyctes
- Species: P. grayi

Binomial name
- Paralamyctes grayi Edgecombe, 2001

Species of centipede

Paralamyctes grayi is a species of centipede in the Henicopidae family. It is endemic to Australia. It was first described in 2001 by palaeontologist Gregory Edgecombe.

== Distribution ==
The species occurs in south-eastern New South Wales. The type locality is the Mount Keira Fauna Reserve, near Wollongong in the Illawarra region.

== Behaviour ==
The centipedes are solitary terrestrial predators that inhabit plant litter and soil.
