= Paralamyctes mesibovi =

Scientific classification
- Kingdom: Animalia
- Phylum: Arthropoda
- Subphylum: Myriapoda
- Class: Chilopoda
- Order: Lithobiomorpha
- Family: Henicopidae
- Genus: Paralamyctes
- Species: P. mesibovi

Binomial name
- Paralamyctes mesibovi Edgecombe, 2001

Species of centipede

Paralamyctes mesibovi is a species of centipede in the Henicopidae family first described in 2001 by palaeontologist Gregory Edgecombe. It is endemic to Australia.

== Distribution ==
The species only occurs in the Australian island state of Tasmania. The type locality is Wombat Hill, Waratah, North West Tasmania.

== Behaviour ==
The centipedes are solitary terrestrial predators that inhabit plant litter and soil.
