= Easonobius humilis =

Scientific classification
- Kingdom: Animalia
- Phylum: Arthropoda
- Subphylum: Myriapoda
- Class: Chilopoda
- Order: Lithobiomorpha
- Family: Henicopidae
- Genus: Easonobius
- Species: E. humilis

Binomial name
- Easonobius humilis (Ribaut, 1923)

Synonyms
- Paralamyctes humilis Ribaut, 1923

Species of centipede

Easonobius humilis is a species of centipede in the Henicopidae family. It is endemic to New Caledonia, a French overseas territory in Melanesia. It was first described in 1923 by French entomologist Henri Ribaut.

== Distribution ==
The type locality is Oubatche, near the north-western end of the main island of Grande Terre.
