= Dichelobius etnaensis =

Scientific classification
- Kingdom: Animalia
- Phylum: Arthropoda
- Subphylum: Myriapoda
- Class: Chilopoda
- Order: Lithobiomorpha
- Family: Henicopidae
- Genus: Dichelobius
- Species: D. etnaensis

Binomial name
- Dichelobius etnaensis Edgecombe & Giribet, 2004

Species of centipede

Dichelobius etnaensis is a species of centipede in the Henicopidae family. It is endemic to Australia. It was first described in 2004.

== Distribution ==
The species occurs in eastern Central Queensland. The type locality is the Cammoo Caves in the Mount Etna Caves National Park, near Rockhampton.
