= Anopsobius relictus =

Scientific classification
- Kingdom: Animalia
- Phylum: Arthropoda
- Subphylum: Myriapoda
- Class: Chilopoda
- Order: Lithobiomorpha
- Family: Henicopidae
- Genus: Anopsobius
- Species: A. relictus

Binomial name
- Anopsobius relictus (Chamberlin, 1920)

Synonyms
- Tasmanobius relictus Chamberlin, 1920

Species of centipede

Anopsobius relictus is a species of centipede in the Henicopidae family. It is endemic to Australia. It was first described in 1920 by American biologist Ralph Vary Chamberlin.

== Distribution ==
The species occurs in Tasmania.

== Behaviour ==
The centipedes are solitary terrestrial predators that inhabit plant litter and soil.
