= Dichelobius flavens =

Scientific classification
- Kingdom: Animalia
- Phylum: Arthropoda
- Subphylum: Myriapoda
- Class: Chilopoda
- Order: Lithobiomorpha
- Family: Henicopidae
- Genus: Dichelobius
- Species: D. flavens

Binomial name
- Dichelobius flavens Attems, 1911

Species of centipede

Dichelobius flavens is a species of centipede in the Henicopidae family. It was first described in 1911 by Austrian myriapodologist Carl Attems.

== Distribution ==
The species occurs in south-west and north-west Western Australia. Type localities are Eradu, Lion Mill, Jarrahdale, Donnybrook and Gooseberry Hill.

== Behaviour ==
The centipedes are solitary terrestrial predators that inhabit plant litter and soil.
