= Lamyctes africanus =

Scientific classification
- Kingdom: Animalia
- Phylum: Arthropoda
- Subphylum: Myriapoda
- Class: Chilopoda
- Order: Lithobiomorpha
- Family: Henicopidae
- Genus: Lamyctes
- Species: L. africanus

Binomial name
- Lamyctes africanus (Porat, 1871)

Synonyms
- Henicops insignis Pocock,1891

Species of centipede

Lamyctes africanus is a species of centipede in the Henicopidae family. It was first described in 1871 by Swedish naturalist Carl Oscar von Porat.

== Distribution ==
The species has been recorded from a geographically widespread suite of sites, including Africa, Europe, south-western Western Australia, Hawaii and the Juan Fernandez Islands.

== Behaviour ==
The centipedes are solitary terrestrial predators that inhabit plant litter and soil.
