= Paralamyctes insularis =

Scientific classification
- Kingdom: Animalia
- Phylum: Arthropoda
- Subphylum: Myriapoda
- Class: Chilopoda
- Order: Lithobiomorpha
- Family: Henicopidae
- Genus: Paralamyctes
- Species: P. insularis

Binomial name
- Paralamyctes insularis (Haase, 1887)

Synonyms
- Wailamyctes munroi Archey, 1923

Species of centipede

Paralamyctes insularis is a species of centipede in the Henicopidae family. It is endemic to New Zealand. It was first described in 1887 by German entomologist Erich Haase.

== Distribution ==
The type locality is the subantarctic Auckland Islands archipelago.
