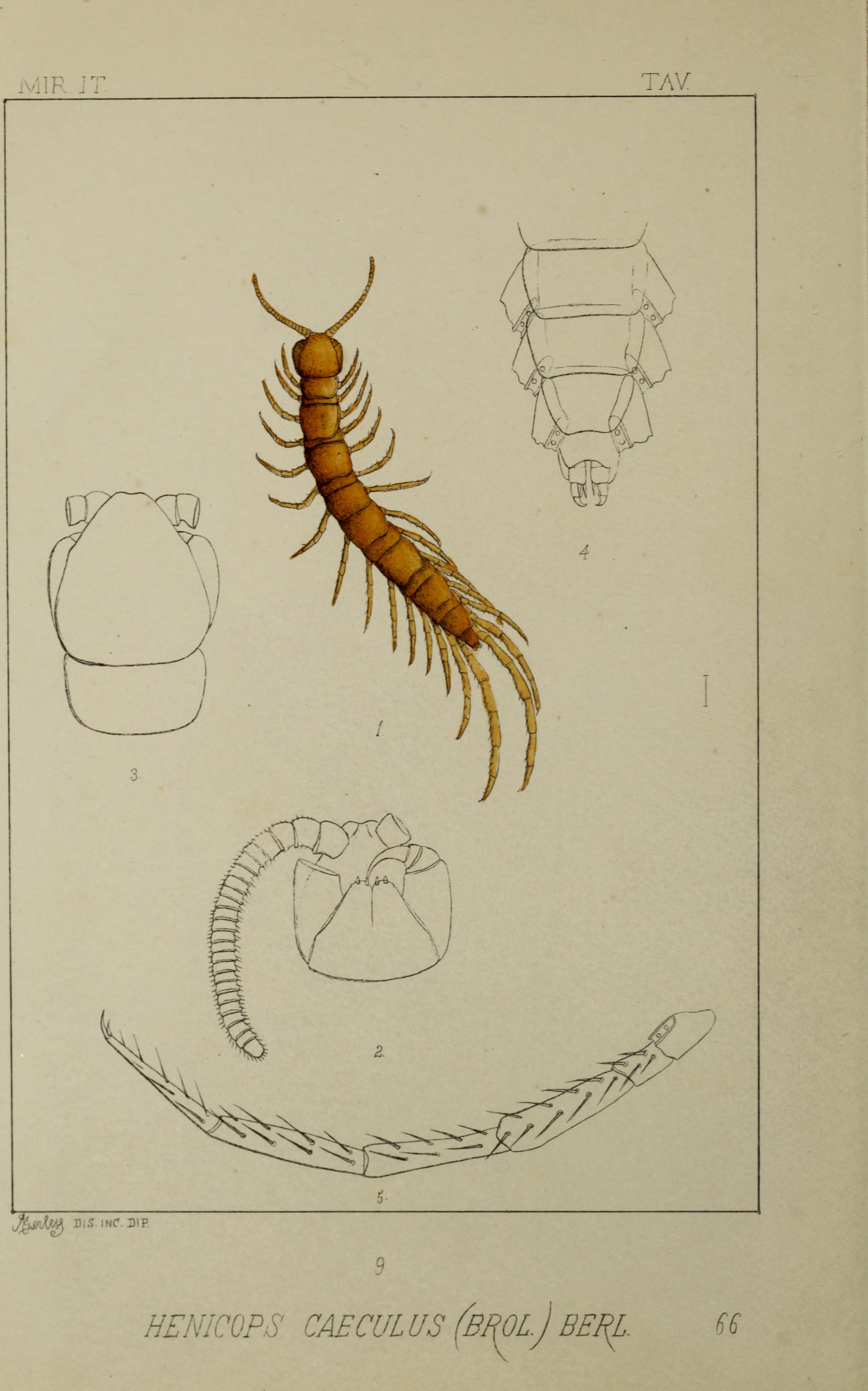
- Lamyctes coeculus

Scientific classification
- Kingdom: Animalia
- Phylum: Arthropoda
- Subphylum: Myriapoda
- Class: Chilopoda
- Order: Lithobiomorpha
- Family: Henicopidae
- Genus: Lamyctes
- Species: L. coeculus

Binomial name
- Lamyctes coeculus (Brölemann, 1889)

Synonyms
- Lithobius coeculus (Brölemann, H.W. 1889); Lamyctinus coeculus (Brölemann, 1889); Remylamyctes straminea Attems, 1951

= Lamyctes coeculus =

Species of centipede

Lamyctes coeculus is a species of centipede in the Henicopidae family. It was first described in 1844 by French myriapodologist Henry Wilfred Brolemann.

== Distribution ==
The species has been recorded from a geographically widespread suite of sites, including Africa, Europe, Australia and South America. The type locality is Milan in Italy.

== Behaviour ==
The centipedes are solitary terrestrial predators that inhabit plant litter and soil.
