= Henicops brevilabiatus =

Scientific classification
- Kingdom: Animalia
- Phylum: Arthropoda
- Subphylum: Myriapoda
- Class: Chilopoda
- Order: Lithobiomorpha
- Family: Henicopidae
- Genus: Henicops
- Species: H. brevilabiatus

Binomial name
- Henicops brevilabiatus (Ribaut, 1923)

Synonyms
- Lamyctes brevilabiatus Meinert, 1868

Species of centipede

Henicops brevilabiatus is a species of centipede in the Henicopidae family. It is endemic to New Caledonia, a French overseas territory in Melanesia. It was first described in 1923 by entomologist Henri Ribaut.

== Distribution ==
The species occurs on the main island of Grande Terre. The type locality is Vallée de Ngoï.
