= Henicops dentatus =

Scientific classification
- Kingdom: Animalia
- Phylum: Arthropoda
- Subphylum: Myriapoda
- Class: Chilopoda
- Order: Lithobiomorpha
- Family: Henicopidae
- Genus: Henicops
- Species: H. dentatus

Binomial name
- Henicops dentatus Pocock, 1901

Synonyms
- Henicops oligotarsus Attems, 1911

Species of centipede

Henicops dentatus is a species of centipede in the Henicopidae family. It is endemic to Australia. It was first described in 1901 by British zoologist Reginald Innes Pocock.

== Distribution ==
The species occurs in south-west Western Australia. The type locality is Perth.

== Behaviour ==
The centipedes are solitary terrestrial predators that inhabit plant litter and soil.
