= Dichelobius bicuspis =

Scientific classification
- Kingdom: Animalia
- Phylum: Arthropoda
- Subphylum: Myriapoda
- Class: Chilopoda
- Order: Lithobiomorpha
- Family: Henicopidae
- Genus: Dichelobius
- Species: D. bicuspis

Binomial name
- Dichelobius bicuspis Ribaut, 1923

Species of centipede

Dichelobius bicuspis is a species of centipede in the Henicopidae family. It is endemic to New Caledonia, a French overseas territory in Melanesia. It was first described in 1923 by French entomologist Henri Ribaut.

== Distribution ==
The species occurs on the main island of Grande Terre. Type localities are Mount Humboldt and Mount Canala.
