= Easonobius =

Scientific classification
- Kingdom: Animalia
- Phylum: Arthropoda
- Subphylum: Myriapoda
- Class: Chilopoda
- Order: Lithobiomorpha
- Family: Henicopidae
- Genus: Easonobius; Edgecombe, 2003

Type species
- Easonobius tridentatus Edgecombe, 2003

Genus of centipedes

Easonobius is a genus of centipedes in the family Henicopidae. The name honours British myriapodologist Edward Holt Eason. It was described by palaeontologist Gregory Edgecombe in 2003.

== Species ==
There are two valid species:

- Easonobius humilis (Ribaut, 1923)
- Easonobius tridentatus Edgecombe, 2003
