= Henicops maculatus =

Scientific classification
- Kingdom: Animalia
- Phylum: Arthropoda
- Subphylum: Myriapoda
- Class: Chilopoda
- Order: Lithobiomorpha
- Family: Henicopidae
- Genus: Henicops
- Species: H. maculatus

Binomial name
- Henicops maculatus Newport, 1845

Synonyms
- Henicops impressus Hutton, 1877

Species of centipede

Henicops maculatus is a species of centipede in the Henicopidae family. It was first described in 1845 by British entomologist George Newport.

== Distribution ==
The species occurs in south-eastern Australia and New Zealand. The type locality is Tasmania.

== Behaviour ==
The centipedes are solitary terrestrial predators, that inhabit plant litter and soil.
