= Dichelobius =

Scientific classification
- Kingdom: Animalia
- Phylum: Arthropoda
- Subphylum: Myriapoda
- Class: Chilopoda
- Order: Lithobiomorpha
- Family: Henicopidae
- Genus: Dichelobius; Attems, 1911

Type species
- Dichelobius flavens Attems, 1911

Genus of centipedes

Dichelobius is a genus of centipedes in the family Henicopidae. It was described by Austrian myriapodologist Carl Attems in 1911.

== Species ==
There are three valid species:

- Dichelobius bicuspis Ribaut, 1923 - New Caledonia
- Dichelobius etnaensis Edgecombe & Giribet, 2004 - Australia (QLD)
- Dichelobius flavens Attems, 1911 - Australia (WA)
