= Ribautia brittini =

Scientific classification
- Kingdom: Animalia
- Phylum: Arthropoda
- Subphylum: Myriapoda
- Class: Chilopoda
- Order: Geophilomorpha
- Family: Geophilidae
- Genus: Ribautia
- Species: R. brittini

Binomial name
- Ribautia brittini Archey, 1922

Synonyms
- Schizoribautia brittini Brölemann, 1912

Species of centipede

Ribautia brittini is a species of centipede in the Geophilidae family. It is endemic to New Zealand. It was first described in 1922 by New Zealand zoologist Gilbert Archey.

== Description ==
This species ranges from 17 mm to 31 mm in length and has 51 to 57 segments, with the number of segments increasing with the length of the centipede.

== Distribution ==
The species occurs on the South Island. The type locality is Waipara, in the north of the Canterbury Region.
