= Pleotarsobius =

Scientific classification
- Kingdom: Animalia
- Phylum: Arthropoda
- Subphylum: Myriapoda
- Class: Chilopoda
- Order: Lithobiomorpha
- Family: Henicopidae
- Genus: Pleotarsobius; Attems, 1909

Type species
- Lamyctes heterotarsus Silvestri, 1904

Genus of centipedes

Pleotarsobius is a monotypic genus of centipedes in the family Henicopidae. It was described in 1909 by Austrian myriapodologist Carl Attems. The sole species is Pleotarsobius heterotarsus (Silvestri, 1904).

== Distribution ==
The species occurs in the Hawaiian Islands. The type locality is Kona, Hawaii.
