= Paralamyctes =

Scientific classification
- Kingdom: Animalia
- Phylum: Arthropoda
- Subphylum: Myriapoda
- Class: Chilopoda
- Order: Lithobiomorpha
- Family: Henicopidae
- Genus: Paralamyctes; Pocock, 1901

Type species
- Paralamyctes spenceri Pocock, 1901

Synonyms
- Triporobius Silvestri, 1917

Genus of centipedes

Paralamyctes is a genus of centipedes in the family Henicopidae. It was described by British zoologist Reginald Innes Pocock in 1901.

== Species ==
There are 26 valid species:

- Paralamyctes asperulus Silvestri, 1904
- Paralamyctes bipartitus (Lawrence, 1960)
- Paralamyctes cammooensis Edgecombe, 2004
- Paralamyctes cassisi Edgecombe, 2001
- Paralamyctes chilensis (Gervaisin, in Walckenaer & Gervais, 1847)
- Paralamyctes ginini Edgecombe, 2004
- Paralamyctes grayi Edgecombe, 2001
- Paralamyctes halli (Archey, 1917)
- Paralamyctes harrisi Archey, 1922
- Paralamyctes hornerae Edgecombe, 2001
- Paralamyctes insularis (Haase, 1887)
- Paralamyctes levigatus Attems, 1928
- Paralamyctes mesibovi Edgecombe, 2001
- Paralamyctes monteithi Edgecombe, 2001
- Paralamyctes neverneverensis Edgecombe, 2001
- Paralamyctes newtoni (Silvestri, 1917)
- Paralamyctes prendinii Edgecombe, 2003
- Paralamyctes quadridens Lawrence, 1960
- Paralamyctes rahuensis Edgecombe, 2004
- Paralamyctes spenceri Pocock, 1901
- Paralamyctes subicolus Edgecombe, 2004
- Paralamyctes trailli (Archey, 1917)
- Paralamyctes tridens Lawrence, 1960
- Paralamyctes validus Archey, 1917
- Paralamyctes weberi Silvestri, 1904
- Paralamyctes wellingtonensis Edgecombe, 2003
