= Henicops =

Scientific classification
- Kingdom: Animalia
- Phylum: Arthropoda
- Subphylum: Myriapoda
- Class: Chilopoda
- Order: Lithobiomorpha
- Family: Henicopidae
- Genus: Henicops; Newport, 1899

Type species
- Henicops maculatus Newport, 1845

Genus of centipedes

Henicops is a genus of centipedes in the family Henicopidae. It was described by British entomologist George Newport in 1845.

== Species ==
There are eight valid species:

- Henicops armenicus Muralewicz, 1926
- Henicops brevilabiatus (Ribaut, 1923)
- Henicops dentatus Pocock, 1901
- Henicops howensis Edgecombe, 2004
- Henicops maculatus Newport, 1845
- Henicops milledgei Hollington & Edgecombe, 2004
- Henicops tropicanus Hollington & Edgecombe, 2004
- Henicops washpoolensis Edgecombe & Hollington, 2005
