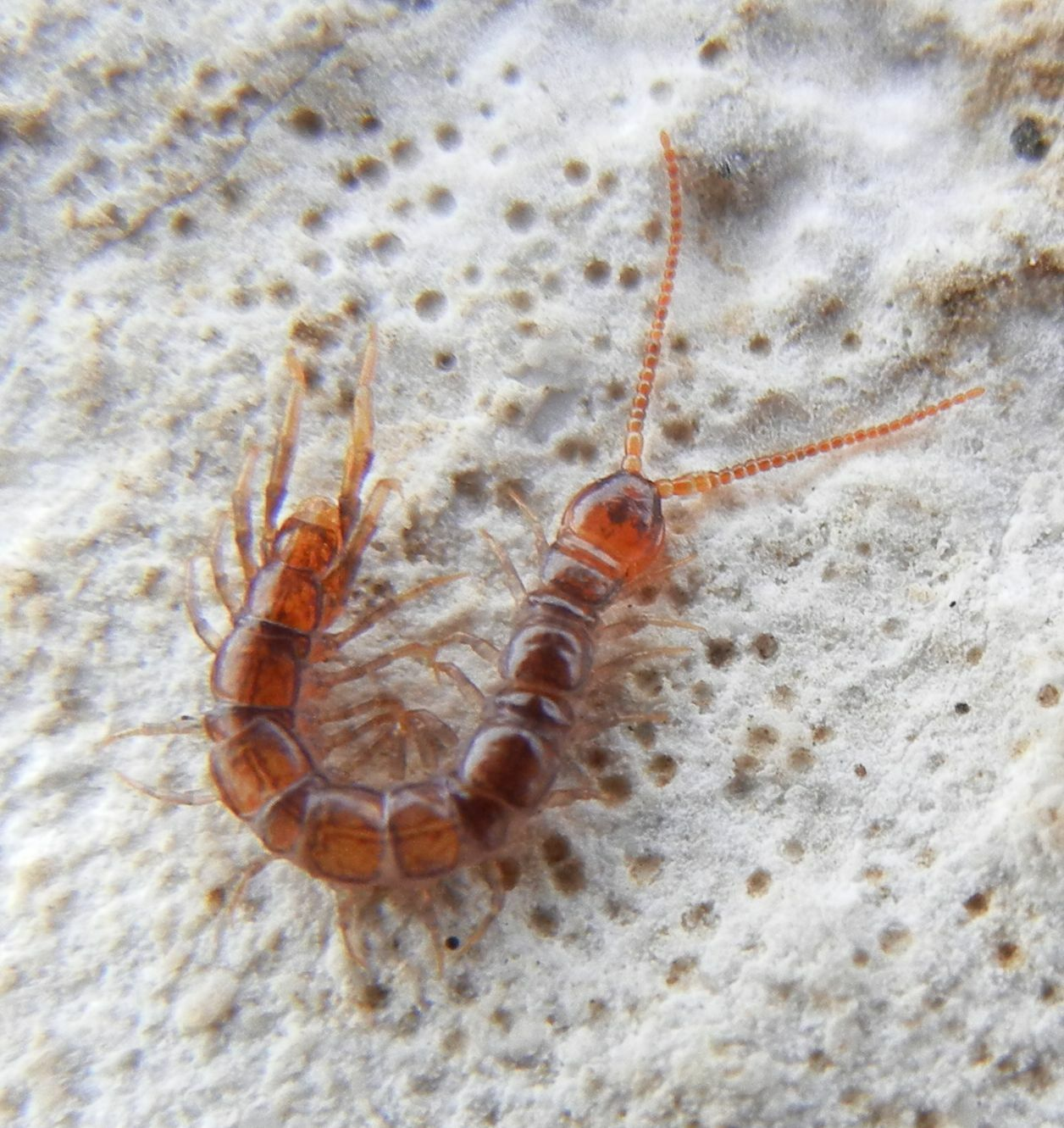
- Lamyctes emarginatus

Scientific classification
- Kingdom: Animalia
- Phylum: Arthropoda
- Subphylum: Myriapoda
- Class: Chilopoda
- Order: Lithobiomorpha
- Family: Henicopidae
- Genus: Lamyctes; Meinert, 1868

Type species
- Lamyctes fulvicornis Meinert, 1868

Synonyms
- Lamyctinus Silvestri, 1909; Remylamyctes Attems, 1951

= Lamyctes =

Genus of centipedes

Lamyctes is a genus of centipedes in the family Henicopidae. It was described by Danish entomologist Frederik Vilhelm August Meinert in 1868.

== Species ==
There are over 40 valid species:

- Lamyctes adisi Zalesskaja, 1994
- Lamyctes africanus (Porat, 1871)
- Lamyctes albipes (Pocock, 1895)
- Lamyctes anderis Chamberlin, 1955
- Lamyctes andinus Kraus, 1954
- Lamyctes baeckstroemi Verhoeff, 1924
- Lamyctes caducens Chamberlin, 1938
- Lamyctes cairensis Chamberlin, 1921
- Lamyctes calbucensis Verhoeff, 1939
- Lamyctes castaneus Attems, 1909
- Lamyctes cerronus Chamberlin, 1957
- Lamyctes coeculus (Brölemann, 1889)
- Lamyctes cuzcotes Chamberlin, 1944
- Lamyctes diffusus Chamberlin & Mulaik, 1940
- Lamyctes emarginatus (Newport, 1844)
- Lamyctes gracilipes Takakuwa, 1940
- Lamyctes guamus Chamberlin, 1946
- Lamyctes hellyeri Edgecombe & Giribet, 2003
- Lamyctes inermipes (Silvestri, 1897)
- Lamyctes inexpectatus Kurochkina, 2007
- Lamyctes insulanus Verhoeff, 1941
- Lamyctes leleupi Matic & Darabantu, 1977
- Lamyctes leon Chamberlin, 1944
- Lamyctes liani Larwood, 1946
- Lamyctes medius Chamberlin, 1951
- Lamyctes microporus Attems, 1909
- Lamyctes neglectus Lawrence, 1955
- Lamyctes neotropicus Turk, 1955
- Lamyctes nesiotes Chamberlin, 1952
- Lamyctes omissus Kraus, 1957
- Lamyctes orthodox Chamberlin, 1951
- Lamyctes oticus Archey, 1921
- Lamyctes pachypes Takakuwa, 1941
- Lamyctes pinampus Chamberlin, 1910
- Lamyctes pius Chamberlin, 1911
- Lamyctes remotior Chamberlin, 1955
- Lamyctes robustus Lawrence, 1955
- Lamyctes taulisensis Kraus, 1954
- Lamyctes tivius Chamberlin, 1911
- Lamyctes tolucanus Chamberlin, 1943
- Lamyctes transversus Chamberlin, 1962
- Lamyctes tristani (Pocock, 1893)
