= Anopsobius =

Scientific classification
- Kingdom: Animalia
- Phylum: Arthropoda
- Subphylum: Myriapoda
- Class: Chilopoda
- Order: Lithobiomorpha
- Family: Henicopidae
- Genus: Anopsobius; Silvestri, 1899

Type species
- Anopsobius productus Silvestri, 1899

Synonyms
- Promethon Chamberlin, 1962; Tasmanobius Chamberlin, 1920

Genus of centipedes

Anopsobius is a genus of centipedes in the family Henicopidae. It was described by Italian entomologist Filippo Silvestri in 1899.

== Species ==
There are 10 valid species:

- Anopsobius actius Chamberlin, 1962
- Anopsobius diversus Chamberlin, 1962
- Anopsobius giribeti (Edgecombe, 2004)
- Anopsobius macfaydeni Eason, 1993
- Anopsobius neozelanicus Silvestri, 1909
- Anopsobius patagonicus Silvestri, 1909
- Anopsobius productus Silvestri, 1899
- Anopsobius relictus (Chamberlin, 1920)
- Anopsobius schwabei (Verhoeff, 1939)
- Anopsobius wrighti Edgecombe, 2003
