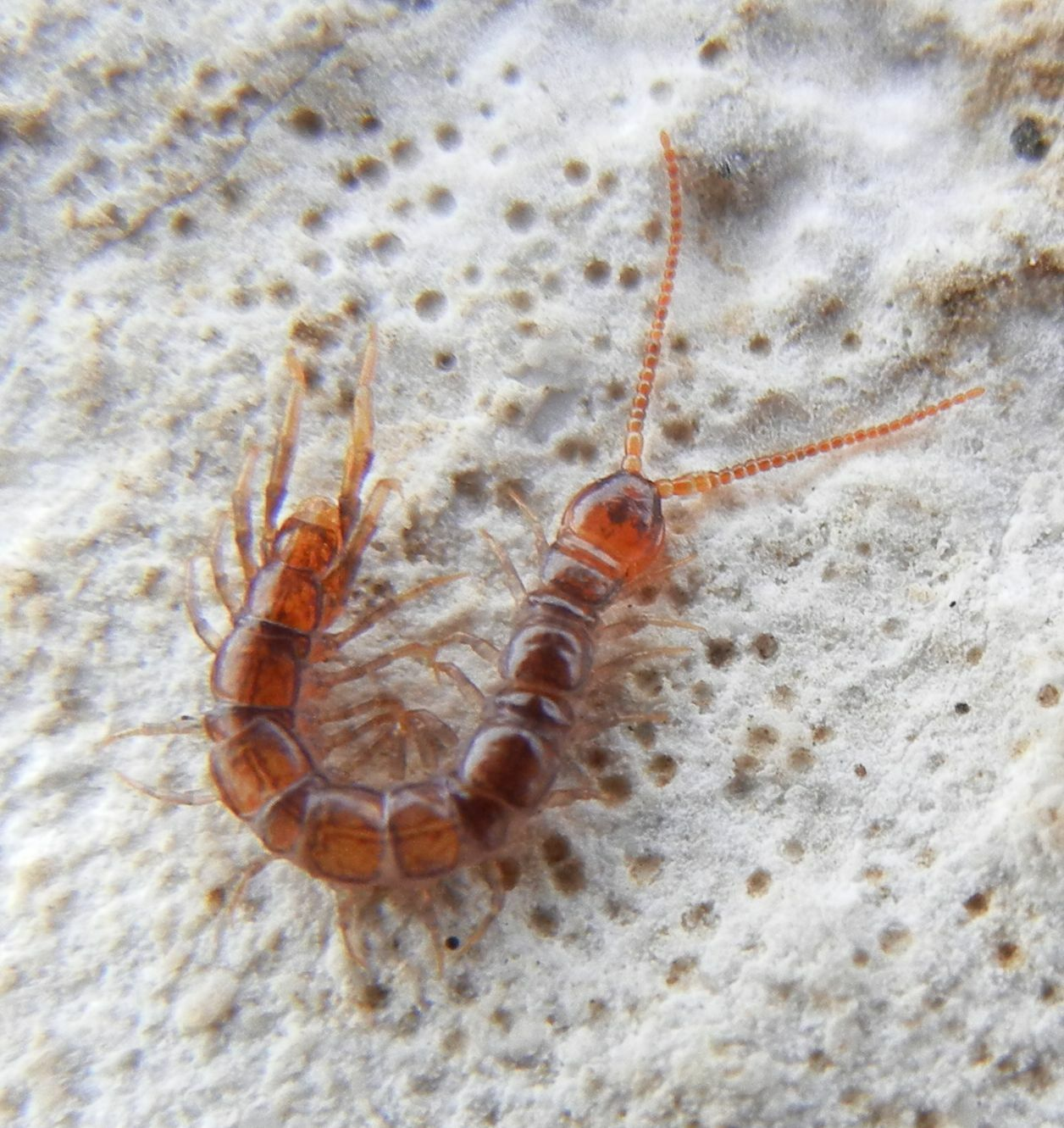
- Lamyctes emarginatus

Scientific classification
- Kingdom: Animalia
- Phylum: Arthropoda
- Subphylum: Myriapoda
- Class: Chilopoda
- Order: Lithobiomorpha
- Family: Henicopidae
- Genus: Lamyctes
- Species: L. emarginatus

Binomial name
- Lamyctes emarginatus (Newport, 1844)

Synonyms
- Lithobius emarginatus Newport, G. 1844; Arkansobius chathamensis Archey, 1917; Lamyctes fulvicornis Meinert, 1868; Lithobius gracilis Porat, 1869; Lamyctes kermadecensis Archey, 1917; Lamyctes munianus Chamberlin, 1920; Lamyctes navaianus Chamberlin, 1920; Lamyctes neozelanicus Archey, 1917; Lamyctes tasmanianus Chamberlin, 1920; Lamyctes zelandicus Chamberlin, 1920; Lamyctes fulvicornis hawaiiensis Silvestri, 1904

= Lamyctes emarginatus =

Species of centipede

Lamyctes emarginatus is a species of centipede in the Henicopidae family. It was first described in 1844 by British entomologist George Newport.

== Distribution ==
The species has been recorded from a geographically widespread suite of sites, including Africa, Europe, Australasia, Greenland and the Galapagos Islands. The type locality is New Zealand.

== Behaviour ==
The centipedes are solitary terrestrial predators that inhabit plant litter and soil.
