= Ribautia aggregata =

Scientific classification
- Kingdom: Animalia
- Phylum: Arthropoda
- Subphylum: Myriapoda
- Class: Chilopoda
- Order: Geophilomorpha
- Family: Geophilidae
- Genus: Ribautia
- Species: R. aggregata

Binomial name
- Ribautia aggregata (Brölemann, 1915)

Synonyms
- Schizoribautia aggregatum Brölemann, 1915; Schizoribautia aggregatus Chamberlin, 1920

Species of centipede

Ribautia aggregata is a species of centipede in the Geophilidae family. It is endemic to Australia, and was first described in 1915 by French myriapodologist Henry Wilfred Brolemann. Females of this species have 67 to 71 pairs of legs and are about 50 mm long.

== Distribution ==
The species occurs in New South Wales.

== Behaviour ==
The centipedes are solitary terrestrial predators that inhabit plant litter, soil and rotting wood.
