= Ribautia gracilis =

Scientific classification
- Kingdom: Animalia
- Phylum: Arthropoda
- Subphylum: Myriapoda
- Class: Chilopoda
- Order: Geophilomorpha
- Family: Geophilidae
- Genus: Ribautia
- Species: R. gracilis

Binomial name
- Ribautia gracilis Ribaut, 1923

Species of centipede

Ribautia gracilis is a species of soil centipede in the Geophilidae family. This centipede is endemic to New Caledonia, a French overseas territory in Melanesia. This species features 53 pairs of legs in each sex and can reach 20 mm in length.

== Discovery and distribution ==
This species was first described in 1923 by the French zoologist Henri Ribaut. He based the original description of this species on a sample of specimens including both sexes. These specimens were found in the commune of Koné in the North Province on the main island of Grande Terre in New Caledonia. Since the original description of this species, this centipede has also been recorded in the South Province on the island of Grande Terre.

== Description ==
This species can reach 20 mm in length, and both males and females feature 53 leg pairs. The dorsal plate on the head is 1.45 times as long as wide and lacks a frontal line. The posterior margin of the labrum features a fringe on not only the middle piece but also the inner parts of the side pieces. Each of the second maxillae features a large claw, but the articles of these maxillae feature no teeth on the external margin. The chitin lines on the forcipular sternite are incomplete, reaching only the middle of the sternite. The inner margin of the first article of the forcipule features a tubercle in the middle and a prominent distal tooth, and the base of the fourth article features a tooth shaped like a cone, but the inner margin of the claw is smooth.

The sternites feature pores from the third segment to the seventeenth segment. These pores are arranged in a single rounded field on the anterior segments, with each field slightly elongated, but these pores are divided into two fields on the fifteenth segment. Only a few pores appear on the sixteenth and seventeenth segments. The basal element of each of the ultimate legs (coxopleuron) features pores arranged in three groups, each with two or three pores, which each open into a pocket at the margin by the adjacent sternite. The telson lacks anal pores.

This species exhibit traits that characterize the genus Ribautia. For example, as in other species in this genus, the forcipular sternite features chitin lines, and the sternites of the anterior trunk segments feature pores arranged in a single field. Furthermore, as in other species in this genus, the head in this species is distinctly longer than wide.

This species shares a more distinctive set of traits with a Peruvian species of Ribautia, R. seydi. For example, in both of these species, only sternites on the anterior part of the trunk feature pore fields, and the pores on the coxopleura are arranged in groups that open into pockets next to the adjacent sternite. Furthermore, in both species, the inner margin of the first article of the forcipule features a distal tooth, but the outer margin of the second article of the second maxillae lacks teeth. Moreover, both of these species include specimens with 53 leg pairs.

These two species can be distinguished, however, based on other traits. For example, anal pores are present in R. seydi but absent in R. gracilis. Furthermore, the middle of the labrum features a fringe in R. gracilis but bears teeth in R. seydi. Moreover, the pore fields on the anterior sternites extend to about segment 27 in R. seydi but no further than segment 17 in R. gracilis.
