= Ribautia pruvotae =

Scientific classification
- Kingdom: Animalia
- Phylum: Arthropoda
- Subphylum: Myriapoda
- Class: Chilopoda
- Order: Geophilomorpha
- Family: Geophilidae
- Genus: Ribautia
- Species: R. pruvotae

Binomial name
- Ribautia pruvotae (Brolemann, 1931)

Synonyms
- Schizoribautia pruvotae Brölemann, 1912

Species of centipede

Ribautia pruvotae is a species of centipede in the Geophilidae family. It is endemic to New Caledonia, a French overseas territory in Melanesia. It was described in 1931 by French myriapodologist Henry Wilfred Brolemann.

== Description ==
The original description of this species is based on a male specimen measuring 25 mm in length with 55 pairs of legs.

== Distribution ==
The species occurs in the Loyalty Islands Province. The type locality is Lifou Island.
