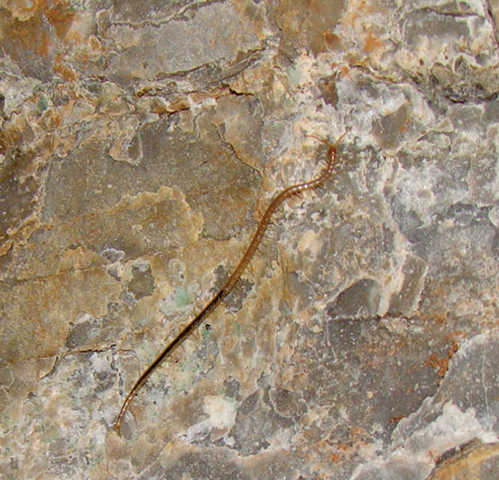
- Ribautia sp.

Scientific classification
- Kingdom: Animalia
- Phylum: Arthropoda
- Subphylum: Myriapoda
- Class: Chilopoda
- Order: Geophilomorpha
- Family: Geophilidae
- Genus: Ribautia; Brölemann, 1909

Type species
- Ribautia bouvieri Brölemann, 1909

Synonyms
- Schizoribautia Brölemann, 1912; Polygonarea (Nearia) Chamberlin, 1955

= Ribautia =

Genus of centipedes

Ribautia is a genus of centipedes in the family Geophilidae. This genus was described by French myriapodologist Henry Wilfred Brolemann in 1909. Centipedes in this genus are found in South America, tropical Africa, Madagascar, the Arabian peninsula, Australia, New Zealand, and Melanesia.

== Description ==
Centipedes in this genus feature elongate heads, elongate forcipules, and mandibles with long bristles. The second maxillae are connected by only a narrow bridge in the middle of the coxosternite. This coxosternite features processes projecting from the inner corners of the anterior margins and prominent sclerotized ridges. The forcipular sternite features a pair of narrow sclerotized stripes (chitin lines). Pores arranged in a single field appear on sternites on at least the anterior segments of the trunk.

These centipedes range from about 1 cm to about 7 cm in length and can have as few as 31 or as many as 125 pairs of legs. The small species Ribautia platensis, found in Argentina, measures only 9 mm in length and can have as few as 31 leg pairs (31 pairs in males, 31 or 33 in females), the minimum number recorded in this genus. Other small species of Ribautia with notably few legs include the Peruvian species R. williamsi (known from a female specimen measuring 12 mm in length with 37 leg pairs), the African species R. paucipes (reaching 15 mm in length, with 39 leg pairs in type specimens including both sexes), and the Brazilian species R. onycophaena (reaching 13 mm in length, with 39 leg pairs in males and 41 in females). The large species R. taeniata, found in New Caledonia, can reach 75 mm in length and can have as many as 125 leg pairs (105 to 121 pairs in males, 111 to 125 in females), the maximum number recorded in this genus.

== Phylogeny ==
A phylogenetic analysis of the order Geophilomorpha using both molecular data and morphology places a representative of the genus Ribautia in a clade with a sister group formed by representatives of two other genera in the family Geophilidae, Polygonarea and Hyphydrophilus. This phylogenetic tree suggests that these two genera are more closely related to Ribautia than any other genera included in this analysis. These three close relatives form a sister group for a representative of another genus in the same family, Plateurytion, which emerges as the next closest relative included in this analysis. These four close relatives also form a sister group for a representative of another genus in the same family, Steneurytion, which emerges as the next closest relative included in this analysis.

== Species ==
This genus contains more than 50 valid species, including the following:

- Ribautia aggregata (Brölemann, 1915)
- Ribautia brittini (Archey,1922)
- Ribautia coarctata Ribaut, 1923
- Ribautia conifera (Attems, 1911)
- Ribautia derrana (Chamberlin, 1920)
- Ribautia dietrichiae (Verhoeff, 1925)
- Ribautia gracilis Ribaut, 1923
- Ribautia imparata (Attems, 1911)
- Ribautia mjoebergi (Verhoeff, 1925)
- Ribautia onycophaena Pereira, Foddai & Minelli, 2000
- Ribautia pruvotae (Brolemann, 1931)
- Ribautia rainbowi (Brölemann, 1912)
- Ribautia repanda (Attems, 1911)
- Ribautia taeniata Ribaut, 1923
- Ribautia wheeleri (Chamberlin, 1920)
