= Ribautia onycophaena =

Scientific classification
- Kingdom: Animalia
- Phylum: Arthropoda
- Subphylum: Myriapoda
- Class: Chilopoda
- Order: Geophilomorpha
- Family: Geophilidae
- Genus: Ribautia
- Species: R. onycophaena

Binomial name
- Ribautia onycophaena Pereira, Foddai & Minelli, 2000

Species of centipede

Ribautia onycophaena is a species of soil centipede in the family Geophildae. This centipede is found in Brazil. This species is notable for its small size, reaching only 13 mm in length, and modest number of legs, with only 39 pairs in males and 41 pairs in females.

== Discovery and distribution ==
This species was first described in 2000 by the biologists Luis Alberto Pereira, Donatella Foddai, and Alessandro Minelli. They based the original description of this species on an examination of thirteen specimens, including a male holotype, a female allotype, seven paratypes (four males and three females), and four juveniles. These specimens were collected in 1990 and 1991 in a secondary upland forest in the state of Amazonas in Brazil. The holotype and allotype are deposited in the lnstituto Nacional de Pesquisas da Amazonia in the city of Manaus in Brazil. Three paratypes (two males and one female) are deposited in the Museo de La Plata in the city of La Plata in Argentina. This species is known only from the state of Amazonas in Brazil.

== Description ==
Adult females of this species range from 10 mm to 13 mm in length, whereas adult males range from 9.5 mm to 12 mm in length. Males feature 39 leg pairs, and females feature 41 leg pairs. Specimens (preserved in alcohol) are pale and yellowish, with the forcipular segment a pale ochre.

Each antenna is 2.8 times as long as the dorsal plate on the head, which is shaped like a rectangle that is 1.5 times as long as wide. A small area in the middle of the areolate part of the clypeus (clypeal area) is very densely reticulated and features one pair of setae. The clypeus also features another pair of setae on each side of the anterior part and two more setae in the middle of the posterior part. The middle piece of the labrum features about eight short pointed teeth. The mandible features a pectinate lamella with about twelve hyaline teeth. Rudimentary lappets project from the lateral margins of the telopodites of the first maxillae but not from the coxosternite. The second maxillae are connected by only a narrow membrane in the middle of the coxosternite. Each of the second maxillae ends in a well developed claw that is curved at the tip.

When closed, the forcipules reach the front of the head or slightly beyond. The forcipular sternite features a pair of narrow sclerotized stripes (chitin lines) that are incomplete, fading short of the condyles at the anterior margin of this sternite. A small protuberance without pigment projects from the inner margin of the first article of the forcipule. The base of the ultimate article of the forcipule features a poorly pigmented denticle with a rounded tip. Fields of pores appear on the sternites from the second segment to the penultimate segment. These pore fields are divided into two areas on sternites 15 through 33 but are undivided elsewhere. The basal element of each of the ultimate legs (coxopleuron) features two or three pores that open independently near the adjacent sternite. Each of the ultimate legs features seven segments and ends in a claw.

This species exhibit several traits that characterize the genus Ribautia. For example, as in other species in this genus, the second maxillae in this species are connected by only a narrow bridge in the middle of the coxosternite, the forcipular sternite features chitin lines, and the sternites of the anterior trunk segments feature pores arranged in a single field. Furthermore, as in other species in this genus, the head in this species is distinctly longer than wide.

This species shares an especially extensive set of distinctive traits with another species in this genus, R. ducalis, which is also found in the state of Amazonas in Brazil. For example, these two species feature similar numbers of legs (including females with 41 pairs) and are similar in size (reaching 13 mm in length in R. onycophaena and 14 mm in length in R. ducalis). Furthermore, both species feature very densely reticulated clypeal areas, lappets on the telopodites of the first maxillae, and pore fields on sternites that extend to the posterior trunk segments but divide into two separate areas in the middle segments of the trunk. Moreover, the pores on the coxopleuron in each of these species all open separately rather than in clusters.

These two species can be distinguished, however, based on other traits. For example, the distal end of each of the ultimate legs takes the form of a claw in R. onycophaena but is shaped like a tubercle instead in R. ducalis. Furthermore, the chitin lines on the forcipular sternite are incomplete in R. onycophaena but complete in R. ducalis. Moreover, the clypeus in R. onycophaena features only one pair of setae in the clypeal area with another pair of setae on each side of the anterior part, whereas the clypeus in R. ducalis features two pairs of setae in the clypeal area with only one seta on each side of the anterior part.
