= Ribautia derrana =

Scientific classification
- Kingdom: Animalia
- Phylum: Arthropoda
- Subphylum: Myriapoda
- Class: Chilopoda
- Order: Geophilomorpha
- Family: Geophilidae
- Genus: Ribautia
- Species: R. derrana

Binomial name
- Ribautia derrana (Chamberlin, 1920)

Synonyms
- Polygonarea derrana Chamberlin, 1920

Species of centipede

Ribautia derrana is a species of centipede in the Geophilidae family. It is endemic to Australia, and was first described in 1920 by American biologist Ralph Vary Chamberlin. The original description of this species is based on a specimen measuring 31 mm in length with 51 pairs of legs.

== Distribution ==
The species occurs in eastern coastal Queensland. The type locality is Dana, near Brisbane.

== Behaviour ==
The centipedes are solitary terrestrial predators that inhabit plant litter, soil and rotting wood.
