= Ribautia rainbowi =

Scientific classification
- Kingdom: Animalia
- Phylum: Arthropoda
- Subphylum: Myriapoda
- Class: Chilopoda
- Order: Geophilomorpha
- Family: Geophilidae
- Genus: Ribautia
- Species: R. rainbowi

Binomial name
- Ribautia rainbowi (Brölemann, 1912)

Synonyms
- Schizoribautia rainbowi Brölemann, 1912

Species of centipede

Ribautia rainbowi is a species of centipede in the Geophilidae family. It is endemic to Australia, and was first described in 1912 by French myriapodologist Henry Wilfred Brolemann.

== Description ==
The original description of this species is based on a single female specimen measuring about 50 mm in length with 65 pairs of legs.

== Distribution ==
The species occurs in New South Wales.

== Behaviour ==
The centipedes are solitary terrestrial predators that inhabit plant litter, soil and rotting wood.
