= Ribautia imparata =

Scientific classification
- Kingdom: Animalia
- Phylum: Arthropoda
- Subphylum: Myriapoda
- Class: Chilopoda
- Order: Geophilomorpha
- Family: Geophilidae
- Genus: Ribautia
- Species: R. imparata

Binomial name
- Ribautia imparata (Attems, 1911)

Synonyms
- Polygonarea imparata Attems, 1911

Species of centipede

Ribautia imparata is a species of centipede in the Geophilidae family. It is endemic to Australia, and was first described in 1911 by Austrian myriapodologist Carl Attems.

== Description ==
These centipedes can reach 35 mm in length. Males of this species have 45 to 51 pairs of legs; females have 47 to 55 leg pairs.

== Distribution ==
The species occurs in south-west Western Australia.

== Behaviour ==
The centipedes are solitary terrestrial predators that inhabit plant litter, soil and rotting wood.
