= Ribautia repanda =

Scientific classification
- Kingdom: Animalia
- Phylum: Arthropoda
- Subphylum: Myriapoda
- Class: Chilopoda
- Order: Geophilomorpha
- Family: Geophilidae
- Genus: Ribautia
- Species: R. repanda

Binomial name
- Ribautia repanda (Attems, 1911)

Synonyms
- Polygonarea repanda Attems, 1911; Polygonarea repanda multipes Attems, 1911

Species of centipede

Ribautia repanda is a species of centipede in the Geophilidae family. It was first described in 1911 by Austrian myriapodologist Carl Attems.

== Description ==
These centipedes can reach 68 mm in length. Males of this species have 75 to 83 pairs of legs; females have 77 to 85 leg pairs.

== Distribution ==
The species occurs in south-west Western Australia as well as in New Caledonia and the Loyalty Islands.

== Behaviour ==
The centipedes are solitary terrestrial predators that inhabit plant litter, soil and rotting wood.
