= Ribautia coarctata =

Scientific classification
- Kingdom: Animalia
- Phylum: Arthropoda
- Subphylum: Myriapoda
- Class: Chilopoda
- Order: Geophilomorpha
- Family: Geophilidae
- Genus: Ribautia
- Species: R. coarctata

Binomial name
- Ribautia coarctata Ribaut, 1923

Species of centipede

Ribautia coarctata is a species of centipede in the Geophilidae family. It is endemic to New Caledonia, a French overseas territory in Melanesia. It was first described in 1923 by French entomologist Henri Ribaut.

== Description ==
The original description of this species is based on a female specimen measuring 15 mm in length with 43 pairs of legs.

== Distribution ==
The species occurs on the main island of Grande Terre. The type locality is Mont Panié.
