= Ribautia taeniata =

Scientific classification
- Kingdom: Animalia
- Phylum: Arthropoda
- Subphylum: Myriapoda
- Class: Chilopoda
- Order: Geophilomorpha
- Family: Geophilidae
- Genus: Ribautia
- Species: R. taeniata

Binomial name
- Ribautia taeniata Ribaut, 1923

Species of centipede

Ribautia taeniata is a species of centipede in the Geophilidae family. It is endemic to New Caledonia, a French overseas territory in Melanesia. It was first described in 1923 by French entomologist Henri Ribaut.

== Description ==
This species reaches a maximum length of 75 mm. Males of this species have 105 to 121 pairs of legs, whereas females have 111 to 125 leg pairs. The maximum number of leg pairs recorded for this species (125) is also the maximum found in this genus.

== Distribution ==
The species occurs on the main island of Grande Terre. The type locality is Mont Canala.
