= Ribautia conifera =

Scientific classification
- Kingdom: Animalia
- Phylum: Arthropoda
- Subphylum: Myriapoda
- Class: Chilopoda
- Order: Geophilomorpha
- Family: Geophilidae
- Genus: Ribautia
- Species: R. conifera

Binomial name
- Ribautia conifera (Attems, 1911)

Synonyms
- Polygonarea repanda conifera Attems, 1911

Species of centipede

Ribautia conifera is a species of centipede in the Geophilidae family. It is endemic to Australia, and was first described in 1911 by Austrian myriapodologist Carl Attems. These centipedes can reach 48 mm in length. Males of this species have 61 to 71 pairs of legs; females have 63 to 73 leg pairs.

== Distribution ==
The species occurs in south-west Western Australia.

== Behaviour ==
The centipedes are solitary terrestrial predators that inhabit plant litter, soil and rotting wood.
