= Gilbert Archey =

New Zealand ethnologist, zoologist and museum director

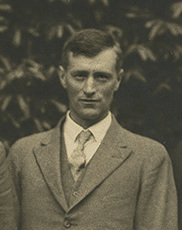
- Archey in 1927
- Born: Gilbert Edward Archey; 4 August 1890; York, England
- Died: October 20, 1974 (aged 84)
- Education: Canterbury University College
- Occupations: Museum director; zoologist; ethnologist; World War I officer

Sir Gilbert Edward Archey CBE FRSNZ (4 August 1890 – 20 October 1974) was a New Zealand zoologist, ethnologist, World War I officer, and museum director. He wrote one of the major works on the moa, based on his own field work and collection. He also published numerous articles and described many new animal species.

== Early life and education ==
Archey was born to Thomas Archey and Sarah Triffitt in York, England in 1890, and emigrated to New Zealand with his parents, at age two. He graduated from Canterbury University College, Christchurch, with the degree of M.A. with honours in zoology in 1913.

== Career ==
After a period teaching at Nelson College, Archey was Assistant Curator of the Canterbury Museum from 1914 to 1923, where he studied and published papers on numerous New Zealand fauna. He particularly worked on New Zealand moa, Dinornithiformes, extinct macrofauna birds. In 1924 he participated in the 1924 Chatham Islands Expedition. He was then appointed Director of the Auckland Institute and Museum in 1924, and was personally responsible for getting funding from the Carnegie Corporation of New York in 1935.

In the First World War, he served in the New Zealand Field Artillery, rising to the rank of captain. In the Second World War he was attached to the British Military Administration in Malaya with the rank of lieutenant-colonel.

He was on the New Zealand University Grants Committee, 1948–51, 1954–60, and on the Council of the Royal Society of New Zealand, being president from 1941 to 1942. He was a member of the Maori Purposes Fund Board, the Waitangi National Trust Board, and the Auckland branch of the Royal Society, and the Queen Elizabeth II Arts Council. He retired from the Auckland Museum early in 1964. His publications, apart from contributions to learned journals, include The Moa, a Study of the Dinornithiformes (1941), South Sea Folk (1937 and 1949); Sculpture and Design, an Outline of Maori Art (1955); and Whaowhia: Maori art and its artists (1977).

== Honours ==
He was appointed an Officer of the Order of the British Empire in 1919, for services in connection with military operations in France and Flanders, and promoted to Commander of the Order of the British Empire in the 1958 Queen's Birthday Honours. In 1935, he was awarded the King George V Silver Jubilee Medal, and in 1953 he received the Queen Elizabeth II Coronation Medal. He was appointed a Knight Bachelor in the 1963 Queen's Birthday Honours.
