= Gregory Edgecombe =

Paleontologist

Gregory Edgecombe FRS
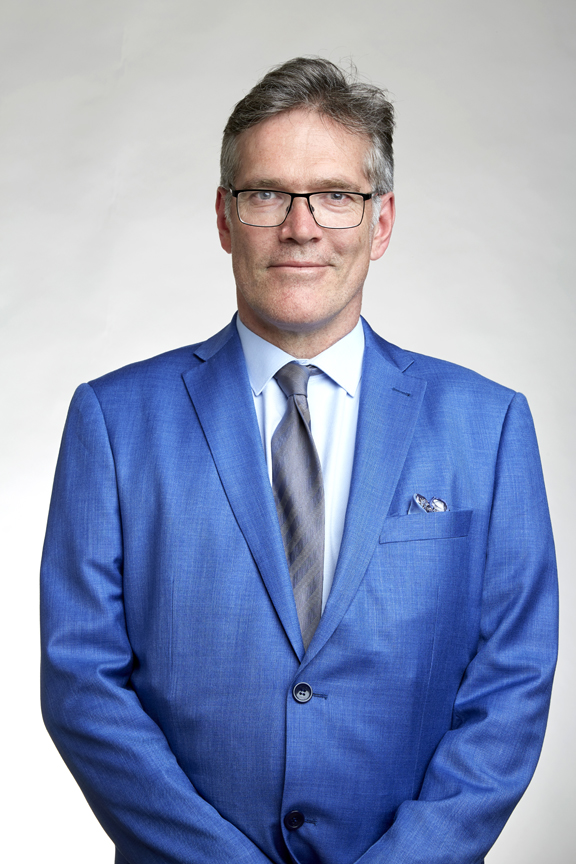
- Edgecombe in 2018
- Education: Acadia University; University of Alberta; Columbia University
- Awards: Fenner Medal (2004)
- Scientific career
- Fields: Systematics; Arthropods; Evolution; Palaeontology; Chilopoda
- Workplaces: University of Alberta; Australian Museum; Natural History Museum, London
- Thesis: Systematic studies on the trilobite order Phacopida (1991)
- Doctoral advisor: Niles Eldredge
- Website: www.nhm.ac.uk/our-science/departments-and-staff/staff-directory/greg-edgecombe.html

Gregory Donald Edgecombe is a paleontologist who is a merit researcher in the department of Earth Sciences at the Natural History Museum, London. He is a leading figure in understanding the evolution of arthropods, their position in animal evolution and the integration of fossil data into analyses of animal phylogeny. As a palaeontologist, he is also an authority on the systematics of centipedes – and a morphologist whose work contributes to the growth and methods of analysis of molecular datasets for inferring evolutionary relationships.

== Education ==
Edgecombe was educated at Columbia University where he received a PhD in 1991 for systematic studies on the trilobite order Phacopida supervised by Niles Eldredge at the American Museum of Natural History.

== Career and research ==
After his PhD, Edgecombe was a postdoctoral researcher at the University of Alberta, and worked as a researcher at the Australian Museum in Sydney for 14 years. In 2007, he took up the position of research leader at the Natural History Museum, London, where since 2013 he has been a Natural Environment Research Council (NERC) merit researcher. With Gonzalo Giribet, he co-authored a textbook, The Invertebrate Tree of Life, published by Princeton University Press in March 2020.

His research program has broadly addressed the fossil record of Euarthropoda, with an emphasis on Paleozoic taxa, such as trilobites, stem-group euarthropods, and stem-groups of the modern subphyla. He has also contributed extensively to the phylogeny of centipedes. One of the important contributions of his career was the identification of euthycarcinoids as the marine sister taxon of Myriapoda.

=== Awards and honours ===
Edgecombe was awarded the president's medal by the Palaeontological Association in 2011, and the Fenner Medal for distinguished research in biology by the Australian Academy of Science in 2004. He was elected a Fellow of the Royal Society (FRS) in 2018. In 2024, a new megacheiran arthropod, Lomankus edgecombei was named after Edgecombe.
