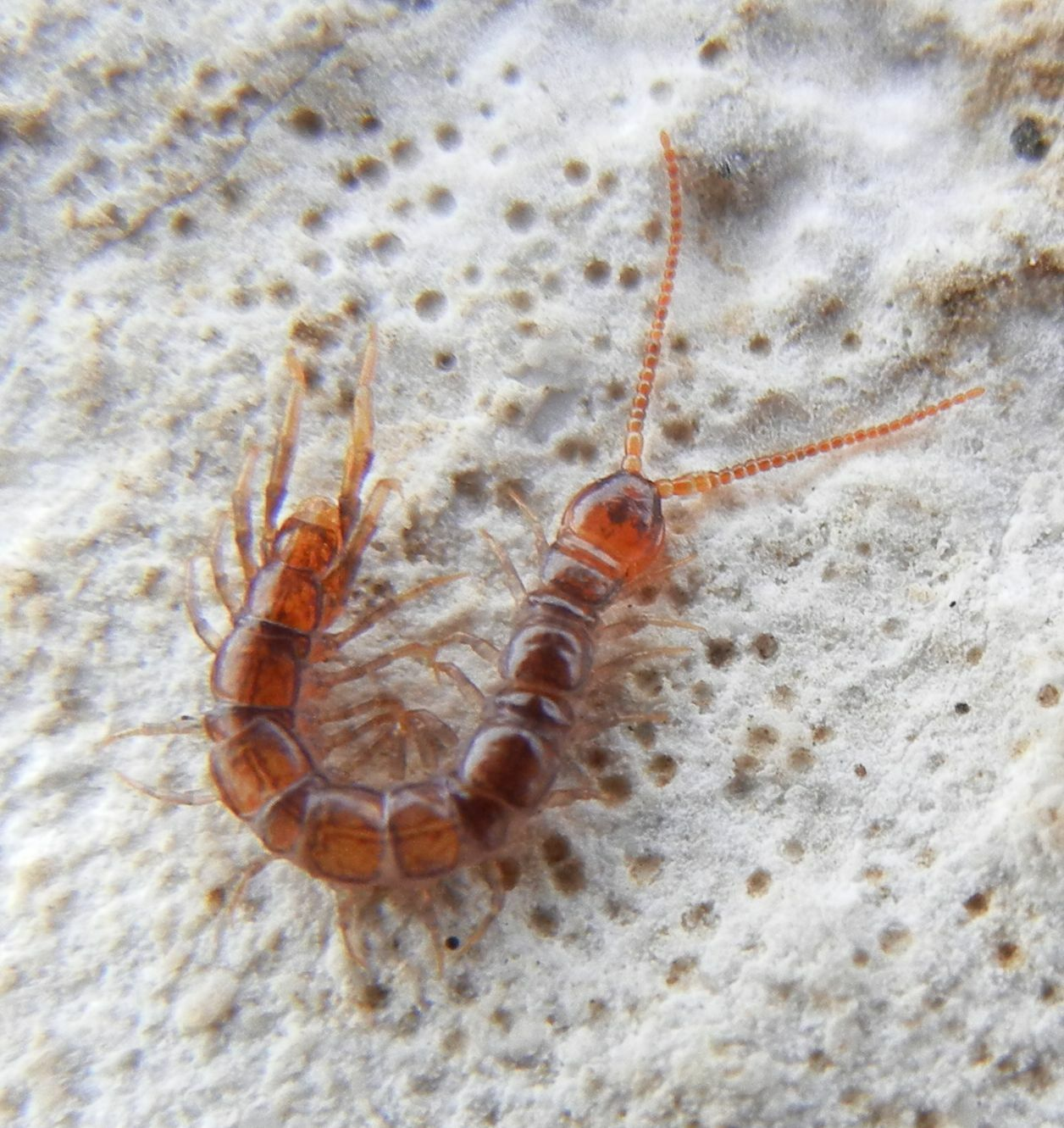
- Lamyctes emarginatus

Scientific classification
- Kingdom: Animalia
- Phylum: Arthropoda
- Subphylum: Myriapoda
- Class: Chilopoda
- Order: Lithobiomorpha
- Family: Henicopidae; Pocock, 1901

= Henicopidae =

Family of centipedes

Henicopidae is a family of stone centipedes in the order Lithobiomorpha. There are about 19 genera and at least 120 described species recognised in the family Henicopidae.

== Genera ==
- Analamyctes
- Anopsobiella
- Anopsobius
- Buethobius
- Catanopsobius
- Cermatobius
- Dichelobius
- Easonobius
- Ghilaroviella
- Hedinobius
- Henicops
- Lamyctes
- Lamyctopristus
- Paralamyctes
- Pleotarsobius
- Rhodobius
- Shikokuobius
- Yobius
- Zygethobius
