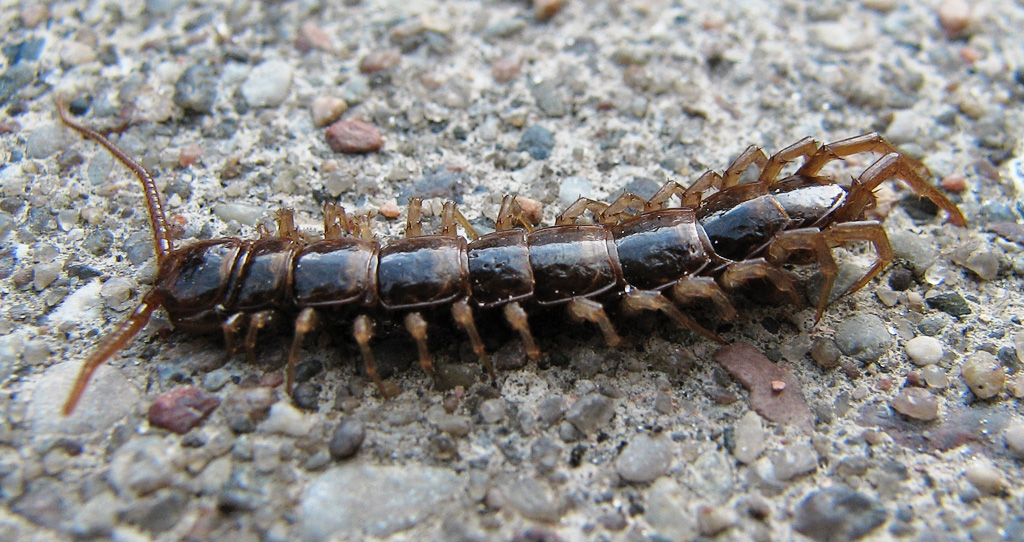
- Lithobius forficatus, a common lithobiomorph

Scientific classification
- Kingdom: Animalia
- Phylum: Arthropoda
- Subphylum: Myriapoda
- Class: Chilopoda
- Subclass: Pleurostigmophora
- Order: Lithobiomorpha; Pocock, 1895

Families
- Henicopidae; Lithobiidae

= Lithobiomorpha =

Order of centipedes

The Lithobiomorpha (from Ancient Greek λίθος (líthos), meaning "stone", βίος (bíos), meaning "life", and μορφή (morphḗ), meaning "form") also known as stone centipedes, are an order of anamorphic centipedes.

== Order ==
They reach a mature segment count of 15 trunk segments. This group has lost the compound eyes, and sometimes has no eyes altogether. Instead, its eyes have a single ocellus or a group of ocelli. Its spiracles are paired and can be found laterally. Every leg-bearing segment of this organism has a separate tergite, these alternating in length apart from a pair of long tergites on each of segments 7 and 8. It also has relatively short antennae and legs compared to the Scutigeromorpha. Two families are included, the Henicopidae and Lithobiidae. Although they have previously been regarded as wholly carnivorous, feeding primarily on insects but also occasionally slugs and worms, they have been proven to feed on leaf litter, as well as associated small animals.
