= Schendylops demelloi =

Scientific classification
- Kingdom: Animalia
- Phylum: Arthropoda
- Subphylum: Myriapoda
- Class: Chilopoda
- Order: Geophilomorpha
- Family: Schendylidae
- Genus: Schendylops
- Species: S. demelloi

Binomial name
- Schendylops demelloi (Verhoeff, 1938)

Synonyms
- Schendylurus demelloi Verhoeff, 1938

Species of centipede

Schendylops demelloi is a species of soil centipede in the family Schendylidae. This centipede is found in Brazil. This species is notable for its large size, reaching 70 mm in length, the maximum size recorded in the genus Schendylops. This centipede can have either 69 or 71 pairs of legs.

== Discovery and distribution ==
This species was first described in 1938 by the German zoologist Karl W. Verhoeff. He based the original description of this species on two specimens, one female and one male. These specimens were found in the Atlantic Forest, in the municipality of Iguape in the state of São Paulo in Brazil. Both the female lectotype and the male type specimen are deposited in the Zoologische Staatssammlung in Munich.

In 2015, seven more specimens were collected near a park in São Roque, another municipality in the state of São Paulo, where this species is relatively abundant and found mostly in forest litter. These specimens include two males (one adult and one juvenile) and five females (three adults and two juveniles). These specimens are deposited in the Instituto Butantan in the city of São Paulo.

== Taxonomy ==
Verhoeff originally described this species in 1938 under the name Schendylurus demelloi. In 1997, the zoologists Richard L. Hoffman and Luis A. Pereira deemed Schendylurus to be a junior synonym of Schendylops. Authorities now accept Schendylops demelloi as the valid name for this species.

== Description ==
Males of this species have 69 pairs of legs, whereas females can have either 69 or 71 leg pairs. The female lectotype has 69 leg pairs, but all other female specimens have 71 pairs. The adult female specimens range from 51 mm to 70 mm in length, whereas the adult males are smaller, ranging from 44 mm to 47 mm in length. Juvenile specimens range from 17 mm to 22 mm in length. When preserved in alcohol, adults have yellow bodies with a darker reddish brown head. Juveniles have white bodies with heads that are slightly orange.

The dorsal plate on the head is slightly longer than wide. The antennae are typically about 2.4 times longer than the cephalic plate and become more slender toward the distal ends. All the articles of each antenna are longer than wide except the first article at the base, which is wider than long. The setae on the second, third, and fourth articles are more numerous in the male than in the female. The labrum features from 19 to 28 teeth. Each of the mandibles feature a dentate lamella divided into three distinct blocks (the first and second blocks each with two or three teeth and the third block with eight to eleven teeth) and a pectinate lamella with about 30 slender teeth that are translucent like glass.

The sternum of the first maxillae is endowed with an unusually large number of setae in the adults of this species. Adult specimens feature from 12 to 24 setae on this sternum, whereas juvenile specimens have only two setae. The sternum of the second maxillae features about 60 setae. Each of the second maxillae features three articles and ends in a partially concave spatulate claw. This claw is pectinate on both the dorsal and ventral edges, with numerous narrow teeth set closely in a row on each edge. Each article of the forcipules lacks teeth.

The sternites feature fields of pores from the first sternite to the penultimate sternite. These fields are roughly circular in shape and are undivided on the anterior and posterior sternites but divided into two roughly circular fields on the middle sternites. The short sclerite in front of the tergite of the ultimate leg-bearing segment (pretergite) is contiguous with a pleurite on each side (intercalary pleurite). The basal element of each of the ultimate legs features two pores on the membrane covered by the corresponding sternite. Each of the ultimate legs features seven articles with a very small tubercle at the distal end.

This species shares many traits with others in the genus Schendylops. For example, the claws of the second maxillae are pectinate on both the ventral and dorsal margins, and the sternites feature pore-fields. Furthermore, each of the ultimate legs features two pores and seven articles without a claw at the distal end.

This species shares an especially extensive set of distinctive traits with S. inquilinus and S. turmalina, two other species in the same genus that are also found in Brazil. For example, the sternites in all three of these species feature pore-fields from the first to the penultimate leg-bearing segment, with these fields undivided on the anterior and posterior segments but divided into two fields on the middle segments. Furthermore, in all three species, the first article of each antenna is wider than long, the dentate lamella on the mandibles is divided into three distinct blocks, and the pretergite of the ultimate leg-bearing segment is contiguous with intercalary pleurites.

The species S. demelloi can be distinguished from the other two species, however, based on other traits. For example, both of these other species have fewer legs than S. demelloi, with 55 leg pairs or fewer in S. inquilinus and 53 pairs or fewer in S. turmalina. Furthermore, the adults in these other species are smaller than those in S. demelloi: Females of S. inquilinus reach only 31 mm in length, whereas males reach only 29 mm in length; females of S. turmalina reach only 42 mm in length, whereas males reach only 22 mm in length. Moreover, the sternum of the first maxillae in these other species also feature far fewer setae than found in the adults in S. demelloi: This sternum in both S. inquilinus and S. turmalina features only two pairs of setae.
