= Schendylops virgingordae =

Scientific classification
- Kingdom: Animalia
- Phylum: Arthropoda
- Subphylum: Myriapoda
- Class: Chilopoda
- Order: Geophilomorpha
- Family: Schendylidae
- Genus: Schendylops
- Species: S. virgingordae

Binomial name
- Schendylops virgingordae (Crabill, 1960)

Synonyms
- Schendylurus virgingordae Crabill, 1960

Species of centipede

Schendylops virgingordae is a species of soil centipede in the family Schendylidae. This centipede is found in the Virgin Islands, Martinique, Venezuela, and Colombia. This species features 51 pairs of legs in the male and 53 leg pairs in females and can reach 43 mm in length. This centipede is notable for the striking sexual dimorphism in the morphology of its antennae, for the unusually dense setae on the sides of its head, and for its littoral habitat.

== Discovery and distribution ==
This species was first described in 1960 by the American myriapodologist Ralph E. Crabill, Jr., based on a female holotype. This specimen was collected in 1958 by the Canadian-American zoologist John F. Gates Clarke. Clarke found this specimen on a beach on Virgin Gorda island in the British Virgin Islands. The holotype is deposited in the form of two slides in the National Museum of Natural History in Washington, D.C.

In 1993, the Argentine myriapodologist Luis Alberto Pereira and the Italian biologist Alessandro Minelli described a second female specimen. This specimen was collected in 1986 from Mero beach in Morrocoy National Park in the state of Falcón in Venezuela. This specimen is deposited in the Muséum de La Plata in Argentina.

In 1999, Pereira described the first male specimen of this species. This specimen was collected in 1985 from a beach in the commune of Le Diamant in Martinique. This specimen is deposited in the Muséum National d'Histoire Naturelle in Paris. This species has since been recorded again in Martinique. This centipede has also been found in a coastal mangrove forest in the town of San Antero in the department of Córdoba in Colombia. Authorities suspect that this centipede may be present on other islands in the Lesser Antilles or at other coastal sites in the Caribbean.

== Taxonomy ==
Crabill originally described this species in 1960 under the name Schendylurus virgingordae. In 1997, however, Pereira and the American zoologist Richard L. Hoffman moved this species to the genus Schendylops when they deemed Schendylurus to be a junior synonym for Schendylops. Accordingly, authorities now accept Schendylops virgingordae as the valid name for this species.

== Habitat and ecology ==
This species is a littoral centipede and an apparent halophile, found only in marine environments. This species inhabits the supralittoral zone of the sea shore, only a few meters from the water and thus subject to salinization from waves and sea spray. This centipede finds shelter under stones, logs, or other plant debris among the psammophilic or halophilic plants that thrive at the high-water mark, such as Ipomea pes-capreae or Canavalia rosea. For example, this species has been found in the litter of Coccoloba uvifera on the beach in Venezuela. This centipede has also been found on calcareous coral remains in a coastal mangrove forest in Colombia. Like other halophilic centipedes, S. virgingordae is widely distributed among scattered localities. Authorities suspect that these species are spread by ocean currents carrying natural rafts across great distances.

== Description ==
This centipede can range from 20 mm to 43 mm in length and can reach 1 mm in width. The male of this species features 51 leg pairs, whereas the females feature 53 pairs. The body ranges from a pale yellowish brown to white, while the head can be darker, and the forcipular segment can be a pale orange.

This species exhibits sexual dimorphism in the morphology of the antennae. For example, the antennae are longer in the male, with each antenna about 4.8 times as long as the head, whereas in the females, the antennae are only 2.3 to 2.8 times as long as the head. Furthermore, the antennae in the male feature more elongated articles and are also covered more densely with setae.

This species also features strikingly numerous short setae on the pleurites on the head in both sexes. The head is longer than wide, with a length/width ratio ranging from 1.1. to 1.4. The dorsal plate on the head features a straight posterior margin and lacks a frontal line. The posterior margin of the labrum features 16 to 18 dark teeth, rounded and blunt in the middle, but becoming more pointed teeth toward each side. The dentate lamella of the mandible features eight to ten teeth divided into three blocks, with two to four teeth in each block. The pectinate lamella (comb blade) of the mandible features 18 hyaline teeth.

The coxosternites of the first and second maxillae are not divided down the middle by any longitudinal suture. The first maxillae feature lappets on not only the telopodites but also the coxosternite. Each of the second maxillae ends in a claw shaped like a spoon with a comb on each edge. The ventral comb bears twelve short teeth, whereas the dorsal comb bears sixteen long hyaline teeth. The forcipules do not reach beyond the front of the head. Each article of the forcipule lacks teeth, and the inner margin of the claw is completely smooth. The forcipular tergite is shaped like a trapezoid with a narrower anterior margin.

Fields of pores appear on sternites from the second segment through segment 20 to 23, with all pore fields undivided. The sternite of the last leg-bearing segment is shaped like a trapezoid with a narrower posterior margin. The basal element of each of the ultimate legs (coxopleuron) features two pores. Each of the ultimate legs features seven articles including the coxopleuron. The most distal article of the ultimate legs is longer than the penultimate article. The ultimate legs in the male are slightly thicker and bear more numerous setae than in the females. The telson lacks anal pores.

This species exhibits traits that characterize the genus Schendylops. For example, as in other species of Schendylops, the claw on each of the second maxillae features both a dorsal comb and a ventral comb, and the sternites of at least some leg-bearing segments feature pore fields. Furthermore, as in other species of Schendylops, each of the ultimate legs features two pores on the coxopleuron and seven articles.

This species shares a more distinctive set of traits with another Neotropical species in the same genus, S. anamariae, which is found in Argentina. For example, both species feature pore fields on only the anterior sternites of the trunk, with all pore fields undivided, but with no pore field on the first sternite, as well as a smooth inner margin on the first article of the forcipule. Furthermore, these two species feature similar numbers of legs, including males with 51 leg pairs and females with 53 leg pairs. Moreover, in both species, the dentate lamella on the mandible is divided into three blocks, and lappets project from not only the coxosternite but also the telopodites of the first maxillae.

These two species can be distinguished, however, based on other traits. For example, the antennae in S. anamariae are long in both sexes, ranging from 4.8 to 5.5 times as long as the head, whereas in S. virgingordae, only the male has antennae that reach such lengths. Furthermore, the setae on the pleurites on the head are numerous and dense in S. virgingordae but less numerous and sparse in S. anamariae. Moreover, the pore fields on the anterior sternites extend only to segment 16 or 17 in S. anamariae but extend through segment 20 or beyond in S. virgingordae.
