= Schendylops pampeanus =

Scientific classification
- Kingdom: Animalia
- Phylum: Arthropoda
- Subphylum: Myriapoda
- Class: Chilopoda
- Order: Geophilomorpha
- Family: Schendylidae
- Genus: Schendylops
- Species: S. pampeanus

Binomial name
- Schendylops pampeanus (Pereira & Coscarón, 1976)

Synonyms
- Pectiniunguis pampeaunus Pereira & Coscarón, 1976; Schendylurus pampeaunus (Pereira & Coscarón, 1976)

Species of centipede

Schendylops pampeanus is a species of soil centipede in the family Schendylidae. This centipede is notable for the sexual dimorphism exhibited in the morphology of the antennae. These sexually dimorphic antennae are unusual among soil centipedes. This species can reach 43 mm in length and features from 49 to 53 pairs of legs. This centipede is found in Argentina.

== Discovery and distribution ==
This species was first described in 1976 by the Argentine zoologists Luis Alberto Pereira and Sixto Coscarón. They based the original description of this species on a large sample of specimens, including hundreds of adults of each sex and several dozen juveniles, collected over several decades, from 1903 to 1974. These specimens include a female holotype and a male allotype, both collected in 1973, and 242 paratypes (132 females and 110 males) collected from 1972 to 1974. These type specimens were collected by Pereira in the district of Bosques in the department of Florencio Varela in the province of Buenos Aires in Argentina. The holotype, allotype, and some of the paratypes are deposited in the Museo de La Plata in Argentina. This species has been recorded not only at the type locality but also at many other sites in the Argentine province of Buenos Aires, including Tandil, Las Flores, La Plata, Gonnet, Villa Elisa, Berisso, Boulogne, Bella Vista, Moreno, Ingeniero Maschwitz, Burzaco, Magdalena, and Parque Provincial Pereyra Iraola.

== Taxonomy ==
Pereira and Coscarón originally described this species in 1976 under the name Pectiniunguis pampeanus. In 1981, however, Pereira moved this species to the genus Schendylurus. In 1997, Pereira and the American zoologist Richard L. Hoffman moved this species to the genus Schendylops when they deemed Schendylurus to be a junior synonym for Schendylops. Accordingly, authorities now accept Schendylops pampeanus as the valid name for this species.

== Ecology ==
This centipede is found in moist and relatively loose soil, usually under leaf litter, but can also be found in leaf litter. This species is found throughout the year at depths ranging from 5 cm to 25 cm, with greater depths associated with periods of drought. Juveniles have been found in a cluster at a depth of 5 cm in a cavity in the root of a privet (Ligustrum) plant. This species has not been observed where ants are present.

== Description ==
Males of this species can reach 38 mm in length, whereas females can reach 43 mm in length. Males usually feature 51 pairs of legs and rarely feature 49 leg pairs; females feature 51 or 53 leg pairs. The body is mostly a yellowish brown, but the anterior part of the body is orange-brown. The dorsal plate on the head (cephalic plate) is slightly longer than wide, with a length/width ratio ranging from 1.0 to 1.1. Each article of the antennae except the first are longer than wide, and the basal article is almost as long as wide. Short hairs cover the distal articles of the antennae starting from the third article in adult females but starting from the second article in adult males. The antennae feature short setae with three distal branches not only on the ultimate article but also on the second, fifth, ninth, and thirteenth articles.

The clypeus features two or three setae behind the antennae but in front of a transverse band of 26 to 35 median setae, followed by a pair of setae in front of the labrum. The labrum bears 10 to 12 relatively blunt teeth in the middle and six to eight teeth on each side, with sharp points on the outer four to six teeth on each side. Each mandible features a pectinate lamella (comb blade) with 17 to 20 hyaline teeth and a dentate lamella with 12 to 14 teeth divided into three blocks, with six or seven teeth in the first block, three teeth in the second, and three or four teeth in the third.

The coxosternite of the first maxillae features two or three pairs of setae but no furrow down the middle. The coxosternite of the second maxillae features 22 to 29 setae but no furrow down the middle. The dorsal edge of the claw at the distal end of each of the second maxillae features a comb with 20 to 26 hyaline teeth that are long and slender, whereas the comb on the ventral edge features 17 to 24 teeth. When closed, the forcipules do not reach beyond the front of the head. The first three articles of each forcipule lack denticles, but the ultimate article features a fold at the base.

The sternites feature fields of pores in an uninterrupted series from the second to the penultimate leg-bearing segment. The pore fields in adults are undivided on the anterior and posterior sternites but divided into two roughly symmetrical areas in the intermediate sternites. These pore fields are divided from the 18th sternite through the 45th or 46th sternite. Both the sternite and the tergite of the last leg-bearing segment are shaped like trapezoids, each with an anterior margin that is wider than the posterior margin and wider than the sclerite is long. The basal element of each of the ultimate legs (coxopleuron) features two pores. The gland connected to the posterior pore features two lobes, but the anterior gland features only one lobe. Each of the ultimate legs features six articles beyond the coxopleuron, with a prominence bearing a short hair rather than a claw at the distal end.

This species exhibits traits that characterize the genus Schendylops. For example, as in other species of Schendylops, the claw on each of the second maxillae features both a dorsal comb and a ventral comb, and the sternites of at least some leg-bearing segments feature pore fields. Furthermore, as in other species of Schendylops, each of the ultimate legs features two pores on the coxopleuron and seven articles but no claw.

This species shares a distinctive set of traits with another Neotropical species in the same genus, S. janelao, which is found in Brazil. For example, both of these species feature an uninterrupted series of pore fields from the second to the penultimate leg-bearing segment, with fields that are undivided on the anterior and posterior sternites but divided in the middle of the body. Furthermore, these species feature similar numbers of setae on the coxosternite of the first maxillae (with five in S. janelao) and similar numbers of teeth on the claw of the second maxillae (with about 25 on the dorsal edge and about 21 or 22 on the ventral edge in S. janelao).

These two species can be distinguished, however, based on other traits. For example, the clypeus features 26 to 35 median setae in S. pampeanus but only 10 to 12 median setae in S. janelao. Furthermore, the sternites feature divided pore fields on fewer segments in S. pampeanus (from the 18th sternite to the 46th sternite at most) than in S. janelao (from the 13th sternite to the 50th sternite). Moreover, the posterior coxal gland features two lobes in S. pampeanus but only one lobe in S. janelao.
