= Schendylops perditus =

Scientific classification
- Kingdom: Animalia
- Phylum: Arthropoda
- Subphylum: Myriapoda
- Class: Chilopoda
- Order: Geophilomorpha
- Family: Schendylidae
- Genus: Schendylops
- Species: S. perditus

Binomial name
- Schendylops perditus (Chamberlin, 1914)

Synonyms
- Schendylurus perditus Chamberlin, 1914

Species of centipede

Schendylops perditus is a species of soil centipede in the family Schendylidae. This centipede is found in Brazil. This species is notable for its modest number of legs, with only 35 pairs in the male and 37 pairs in the female, and for the sexual dimorphism exhibited in the morphology of the antennae. This centipede can reach 17 mm in length.

== Discovery and distribution ==
This species was first described in 1914 by the American biologist Ralph V. Chamberlin. He based the original description of this species on a female specimen. The American zoologists William M. Mann and Harold Heath collected this specimen as well as a male specimen in 1911 at the same site in the state of Paraiba in Brazil. Both specimens are deposited in the Museum of Comparative Zoology at Harvard University. This species is known only from these two specimens and this type locality.

== Taxonomy ==
Chamberlin originally described this species in 1914 under the name Schendylurus perditus. In 1985, the Argentine myriapodologist Luis Alberto Pereira redescribed this species under the same name based on an examination of the male specimen as well as the female specimen. In 1997, however, Pereira and the American zoologist Richard L. Hoffman moved this species to the genus Schendylops when they deemed Schendylurus to be a junior synonym for Schendylops. Accordingly, authorities now accept Schendylops perditus as the valid name for this species.

== Description ==
The male of this species features 35 pairs of legs, whereas the female features 37 leg pairs. The male measures 13 mm in length and 0.3 mm in width, whereas the female measures 17 mm in length and 0.5 mm in width. The body ranges from pale yellow to yellowish orange, with the head, forcipules, and antennae darker and more brownish.

This species exhibits sexual dimorphism in the morphology of the antennae. For example, the antennae are longer in the male, with each antenna 4.2 times as long as the dorsal plate on the head (cephalic plate), whereas in the females, the antennae are only 2.6 times as long as the cephalic plate. Furthermore, although the first and second articles of the antennae feature numerous setae in both sexes, these setae are much more numerous in the male than in the female.

The cephalic plate lacks a frontal suture and is shaped like a rectangle that is only slightly longer than wide, with a length/width ratio of about 1.1. The clypeus features not only a pair of setae behind the antennae, fourteen setae in the middle, and a pair of setae in front of the labrum, but also numerous setae on the lateral margins. The dentate lamella of the mandible is divided into three blocks, with three teeth in the first and last blocks and either two or three teeth in the middle block. The pectinate lamella (comb blade) of the mandible features a row of sixteen to eighteen teeth.

Lappets project from not only the telopodites but also the coxosternite of the first maxillae. The claw at the end of each of the second maxillae features a comb on both edges, with eleven teeth on the ventral comb and seventeen or eighteen teeth on the dorsal comb. The forcipules do not reach the front of the head when closed. The base of the ultimate article of the forcipule features a small pale rounded prominence on the internal margin, but each article of the forcipules lacks teeth.

A single field of pores appears on each sternite from the second segment through the fourteenth segment in the male and through the fifteenth segment in the female. Both the main sternite and the main tergite of the last leg-bearing segment in each sex are shaped like trapezoids with anterior margins wider than the posterior margins. The sclerite in front of the main tergite (pretergite) of the last leg-bearing segment is not fused to the adjacent pleurites, which remain distinct and separated by visible sutures. The basal element of each of the ultimate legs (coxopleuron) features two pores. Each of the ultimate legs features seven articles and ends in a small tubercle with a small spine at the tip.

This species exhibits traits that characterize the genus Schendylops. For example, as in other species of Schendylops, the claw on each of the second maxillae features both a dorsal comb and a ventral comb, and the sternites of at least some leg-bearing segments feature pore fields. Furthermore, as in other species of Schendylops, each of the ultimate legs features two pores on the coxopleuron and seven articles but no claw.

This species shares a more distinctive set of traits with another Neotropical species in the same genus, S. paolettii, which is found in Venezuela. For example, both species feature undivided pore fields on the trunk sternites and a smooth inner margin on the first article of the forcipule. Furthermore, these two species feature similar numbers of legs, including males with 35 leg pairs and females with 37 leg pairs. Moreover, the species S. paolettii is also similar in size, with males reaching 14 mm in length and females reaching 16 mm in length, and features a similar distribution of pore fields on the sternites, from the second through the fourteenth segment in each sex.

These two species can be distinguished, however, based on other traits. For example, the antennae in S. paolettii are intermediate in length, each 3.1 times as long as the head in both sexes, and feature only a few setae on the proximal articles, without the sexual dimorphism exhibited by S. perditus. Furthermore, not only the first two articles of the antennae but also the lateral margins of the clypeus in S. paoletti lack the numerous setae observed in S. perditus. Moreover, the pretergite of the last leg-bearing segment is completely fused to the adjacent pleurites in S. paolettii but not in S. perditus, the sternite of the last leg-bearing segment is shaped like a triangle in S. paolettii but like a trapezoid in S. perditus, and the end of each of the ultimate legs features two small spines in S. paolettii but a single small spine in S. perditus.
