= Schendylops paolettii =

Scientific classification
- Kingdom: Animalia
- Phylum: Arthropoda
- Subphylum: Myriapoda
- Class: Chilopoda
- Order: Geophilomorpha
- Family: Schendylidae
- Genus: Schendylops
- Species: S. paolettii

Binomial name
- Schendylops paolettii (Pereira & Minelli, 1993)

Synonyms
- Schendylurus paolettii Pereira & Minelli, 1993

Species of centipede

Schendylops paolettii is a species of soil centipede in the family Schendylidae. This centipede is found in Venezuela. This species features 35 to 41 pairs of legs and can reach 16 mm in length.

== Discovery and distribution ==
This species was first described in 1993 by the Argentine myriapodologist Luis Alberto Pereira and the Italian biologist Alessandro Minelli. They based the original description of this species on nine specimens, including five females, three males, and one juvenile, all collected in Venezuela in 1987. The female holotype, male allotype, and female paratype were found in rotten wood in the subpáramo zone at an elevation of 2,500 meters in the Andean Region near the city of Boconó. The other specimens were collected from three other sites in the parish of Guaramacal in the Boconó Municipality at elevations ranging from 2,000 to 3,000 meters. This species is named for the Italian zoologist Maurizio Guido Paoletti, who collected all nine specimens. The holotype is deposited in the Museo de La Plata in Argentina. This species is known only from the type locality and the parish of Guaramacal.

== Taxonomy ==
Pereira and Minelli originally described this species in 1993 under the name Schendylurus paolettii. In 1997, Pereira and the American zoologist Richard L. Hoffman moved this species to the genus Schendylops when they deemed Schendylurus to be a junior synonym for Schendylops. Accordingly, authorities now accept Schendylops paolettii as the valid name for this species.

== Description ==
This centipede is yellowish except for the forcipular segment, which is orange. Males of this species feature 35 or 37 pairs of legs, whereas females feature 37, 39, or 41 leg pairs. Males can reach 14 mm in length and 0.4 mm in width, whereas females can reach 16 mm in length and 0.5 mm in width. The dorsal plate on the head (cephalic plate) is slightly longer than wide, with a length/width ratio of 1.1. Each antenna is 3.1 times longer than the cephalic plate in each sex. The clypeus features a pair of setae behind the antennae, another pair in front of the labrum, and four more setae in between. The dentate lamella of the mandible features eight teeth divided into three blocks, with three teeth in the middle block and two or three teeth in the others. The pectinate lamella (comb blade) of the mandible features a row of twenty hyaline teeth.

Lappets project from not only the telopodites but also the coxosternite of the first maxillae. The claw at the end of each of the second maxillae features a comb on the dorsal edge and another on the ventral edge, with ten teeth on each comb. When closed, the forcipules do not reach beyond the front of the head. The first three articles of each forcipule lack teeth, but the inner edge of the ultimate article features a small pale tooth at the base of the claw.

A single field of pores appears on each sternite from the second segment through the fourteenth segment in each sex. These fields are always undivided, but their form changes along the trunk, from a rough rectangle to nearly circular, then to an irregular shape. The sclerite in front of the main tergite (pretergite) of the last leg-bearing segment is fused to the adjacent pleurites. The basal element of each of the ultimate legs (coxopleuron) features two pores hidden under the adjacent sternite. This sternite is shaped like a triangle with a rounded corner pointed to the rear. Each of the ultimate legs features seven articles with two small spines instead of a claw at the distal end.

This species exhibits traits that characterize the genus Schendylops. For example, as in other species of Schendylops, the claw on each of the second maxillae features both a dorsal comb and a ventral comb, and the sternites of at least some leg-bearing segments feature pore fields. Furthermore, as in other species of Schendylops, each of the ultimate legs features two pores on the coxopleuron and seven articles but no claw.

This species shares a more distinctive set of traits with another Neotropical species in the same genus, S. lomanus, which is found in Peru. For example, both species feature undivided pore fields on the trunk sternites, but not on the first sternite and not on the posterior part of the body. Furthermore, both species feature a smooth inner margin on the first article of the forcipule, a small pale tooth at the base of the inner margin of the ultimate article of the forcipule, and two small spines instead of a claw at the distal end of each of the ultimate legs.

These two similar species can be distinguished, however, based on other traits. For example, the clypeus features four medial setae in S. paolettii but eight medial setae in S. lomanus, and the sternite of the last leg-bearing segment is nearly triangular in S. paolettii but shaped like a trapezoid in S. lomanus. Furthermore, the lappets projecting from the coxosternite of the first maxillae are poorly developed in S. paolettii but relatively large in S. lomanus, and S. lomanus features more legs (43 pairs) than recorded in S. paolettii.
