= Schendylops mesopotamicus =

Scientific classification
- Kingdom: Animalia
- Phylum: Arthropoda
- Subphylum: Myriapoda
- Class: Chilopoda
- Order: Geophilomorpha
- Family: Schendylidae
- Genus: Schendylops
- Species: S. mesopotamicus

Binomial name
- Schendylops mesopotamicus (Pereira, 1981)

Synonyms
- Schendylurus mesopotamicus Pereira, 1981

Species of centipede

Schendylops mesopotamicus is a species of soil centipede in the family Schendylidae. This centipede features from 55 to 59 pairs of legs and can reach 38 mm in length. This species can be distinguished from others in the same genus based on the most distal article of the ultimate legs in the male, which is markedly fusiform (shaped like a spindle that is widest in the middle and tapers toward both ends). This centipede is found in the Mesopotamia region of Argentina.

== Discovery and distribution ==
This species was first described in 1981 by the Argentine myriapodologist Luis Alberto Pereira. He based the original description of this species on eleven specimens (seven males and four females), including a female holotype, a male allotype, and nine paratypes. Pereira collected the holotype, allotype, and five paratypes (four males and one female) in 1976 in Concordia in the province of Entre Rios in Argentina. These type specimens are deposited in the Museo de La Plata in Argentina. Pereira collected the other four paratypes in 1980 in Puerto Iguazú in the Argentine province of Misiones. These four paratypes are deposited in the National Museum of Natural History of the Smithsonian lnstitution in Washington, D.C., and in the Muséum d'Histoire Naturelle in Paris, with each museum holding one paratype of each sex. In 1993, Pereira collected six more specimens (three females and three males) from the Parque Nacional Iguazú in the Argentine province of Misiones. This species has been recorded only at these three localities (Concordia, Puerto Iguazú, and the Parque Nacional Iguazú).

== Taxonomy ==
Pereira originally described this species in 1981 under the name Schendylurus mesopotamicus. In 1997, Pereira and the American zoologist Richard L. Hoffman moved this species to the genus Schendylops when they deemed Schendylurus to be a junior synonym for Schendylops. Accordingly, authorities now accept Schendylops mesopotamicus as the valid name for this species.

== Description ==
Males of this species features 55 or 57 pairs of legs, whereas females feature 57 or 59 leg pairs. This centipede is mostly yellowish, but the head, antennae, and forcipular segment are ochre. This species can reach 38 mm in length and 1 mm in width. The dorsal plate on the head (cephalic plate) is shaped like a rectangle that is slightly longer than wide. Each antenna is about 3.7 times as long as the cephalic plate, with each article of the antennae longer than wide. The antennae feature very small setae with three distal branches not only on the ultimate article but also on the second, fifth, ninth, and thirteenth articles.

The clypeus features a pair of setae behind the antennae but in front of about 12 pairs of median setae in a transverse band, followed by a pair of setae in front of the labrum. The labrum bears 10 or 11 blunt teeth in the middle and six or seven pointed teeth on each side piece. Each mandible features a dentate lamella with about 12 teeth divided into three blocks, usually with three teeth in each of the first two blocks and five to seven teeth in the third block. Lappets project from not only the telopodites but also the coxosternite of the first maxillae. The coxosternite of the first maxillae features from six to eight setae. The claw at the distal end of each of the second maxillae features a comb on the dorsal edge and another on the ventral edge, with about 16 teeth on each comb. All articles of the forcipules lack teeth.

The sternites feature fields of pores in an uninterrupted series from the first to the antepenultimate leg-bearing segment, rarely with a few pores on the penultimate sternite. The pore fields are undivided on the anterior and posterior sternites but divided into two roughly symmetrical areas in the intermediate sternites. The divided pore fields can begin as early as the 19th sternite but can begin as late as the 21st sternite, lasting until at least the 52nd sternite but sometimes persisting as far as the 54th sternite.

Both sternite and the tergite of the last leg-bearing segment are shaped like trapezoids, each with an anterior margin that is wider than the posterior margin and wider than the sclerite is long. The basal element of each of the ultimate legs (coxopleuron) features two pores hidden under the adjacent sternite. Each of the ultimate legs features seven articles with the terminal article somewhat longer than the penultimate article. The terminal article of the ultimate legs in the male is strikingly fusiform. Instead of a claw at the distal end of each of the ultimate legs, there is a small tubercle bearing a minute seta.

This species exhibits traits that characterize the genus Schendylops. For example, as in other species of Schendylops, the claw on each of the second maxillae features both a dorsal comb and a ventral comb, and the sternites of at least some leg-bearing segments feature pore fields. Furthermore, as in other species of Schendylops, each of the ultimate legs features two pores on the coxopleuron and seven articles but no claw.

This species shares a distinctive set of traits with another Neotropical species in the same genus, S. borellii, which is found in Paraguay. For example, both of these species feature an uninterrupted series of pore fields from the first to the antepenultimate leg-bearing segment, with fields that are undivided on the anterior and posterior sternites but divided in the middle of the body. Furthermore, these species feature similar numbers of teeth on the labrum (with about 12 in the middle and six or seven on each side piece in S. borellii) and on the dentate lamella of each mandible (with 12 to 15 in S. borellii). Moreover, these species feature similar numbers of legs, with both species including males with 57 leg pairs.

These two species can be distinguished, however, based on other traits. For example, the sternites feature divided pore fields on a more limited number of segments in S. borellii (only from the 23rd sternite to the 50th sternite) than in S. mesopotamicus. Furthermore, the terminal article of the ultimate legs of the male is distinctly fusiform in S. mesopotamicus but not in S. borelli.
