= Schendylops interfluvius =

Scientific classification
- Kingdom: Animalia
- Phylum: Arthropoda
- Subphylum: Myriapoda
- Class: Chilopoda
- Order: Geophilomorpha
- Family: Schendylidae
- Genus: Schendylops
- Species: S. interfluvius

Binomial name
- Schendylops interfluvius (Pereira, 1984)

Synonyms
- Schendylurus interfluvius Pereira, 1984

Species of centipede

Schendylops interfluvius is a species of soil centipede in the family Schendylidae. This centipede is found in Argentina. This species can reach 19 mm in length and can feature either 39 or 41 pairs of legs.

== Discovery ==
This species was first described in 1984 by the Argentine myriapodologist Luis Alberto Pereira. He based the original description of this species on an examination of a large sample of specimens, including not only a female holotype, a male allotype, and 31 other adult paratypes but also 21 other adults and eight juveniles. The type specimens and juveniles were found in 1976 at Salto Grande in the province of Entre Ríos in Argentina; the other adults were found in 1974 in Gualeguaychú in the same province. The type material is deposited in the Museo de La Plata.

== Distribution and habitat ==
This species is known only from the province of Entre Rios in Argentina. The specimens collected at Salto Grande were found about 30 meters from the Uruguay River, near a stream in the forest. These specimens were found as deep as 35 cm in fine-grained soil rich in humus with a significant amount of sand. The specimens collected at Gualeguarychú were found as deep as 25 cm in soil covered with grasses, near a bridge over the Gualeguaychú River.

== Taxonomy ==
Pereira originally described this species in 1984 under the name Schendylurus interfluvius. In 1997, the American zoologist Richard L. Hoffman and Pereira moved this species to the genus Schendylops when they deemed Schendylurus to be a junior synonym for Schendylops. Authorities now accept Schendylops interfluvius as the valid name for this species.

== Description ==
Females of this species feature 41 leg pairs; males usually feature 39 but can also feature 41 leg pairs. This species is small, reaching only 19 mm in length. The body and antennae are a pale yellow, but the head and forcipular segment are ochre. Each antenna is about 3.8 times as long as the head in the male and about 3.2 times as long as the head in the female. The fourth segment of each antenna is similar in length to the contiguous segments rather than much longer. The dentate lamella of each mandible is divided into two blocks, with two to four teeth in each block. The pectinate lamella of each mandible features 14 to 17 hyaline teeth. The coxosternite of the first maxillae features a pair of setae, with one on each side. Large lappets project from the lateral margins of both the coxosternite and the telopodites of the first maxillae. The claw at the end of each of the second maxillae features a dorsal comb with seven to ten teeth and a ventral comb with six to eight teeth. The forcipule features a small pale rounded prominence at the base of the ultimate article but no teeth on the inner margin.

The sternites of the first leg-bearing segment and the most posterior segments lack fields of pores, but pore fields appear on the sternites of segments 2 through 12, sometimes extending as far as segment 14. The pore field on each of these sternites is undivided, but one to three more pores appear on each side of the anterior margin of the field. The legs on these anterior segments feature second and third articles that are much wider than the more distal articles. The middle of the anterior margin of the sternite features a small shallow pit on segments 3 through 9, sometimes including sternites up to segment 12. Both the sternite and the tergite of the last leg-bearing segment are shaped like trapezoids that are wider along the anterior margin than long. The basal element of each of the ultimate legs (coxopleuron) features two pores covered by the adjacent sternite. Each of the ultimate legs features seven articles and ends in a small tubercle with a small spine at the tip.

This species exhibits traits that characterize the genus Schendylops. For example, as in other species of Schendylops, the claw on each of the second maxillae features both a dorsal comb and a ventral comb, and the sternites of at least some leg-bearing segments feature pore fields. Furthermore, as in other species of Schendylops, each of the ultimate legs features two pores on the coxopleuron and seven articles but no claw.

This species shares an especially extensive set of distinctive traits with another species in the same genus, S. jeekeli, which is found in Brazil. For example, these two species feature similar numbers of legs, including males with 39 leg pairs. Furthermore, in both species, the sternites feature pore fields that are undivided, but with a few more pores on each side of the anterior border of the field, and these pore fields are limited to the anterior region of the body, but without a pore field on the first leg-bearing segment. Moreover, in each of these two species, the fourth segment of each antenna is similar in length to the contiguous segments, the dentate lamella of each mandible is divided into blocks, the coxosternite of the first maxillae features setae, and the inner margin of the first article of the forcipule lacks teeth.

These two similar species can be distinguished, however, based on other traits. For example, the dentate lamella of each mandible is divided into three blocks in S. jeekeli but only two blocks in S. interfluvius. Furthermore, the second and third articles of the anterior walking legs are wider than the more distal articles in S. interfluvius but not in S. jeekeli. Moreover, the middle of the anterior margin of sternites in some anterior segments feature a small shallow pit in S. interfluvius but not in S. jeekeli.
