= Schendylops amazonicus =

Scientific classification
- Kingdom: Animalia
- Phylum: Arthropoda
- Subphylum: Myriapoda
- Class: Chilopoda
- Order: Geophilomorpha
- Family: Schendylidae
- Genus: Schendylops
- Species: S. amazonicus

Binomial name
- Schendylops amazonicus (Pereira, Minelli & Barbieri, 1994)

Synonyms
- Schendylurus amazonicus Pereira, Minelli & Barbieri, 1994

Species of centipede

Schendylops amazonicus is a species of soil centipede in the family Schendylidae. This centipede can reach 27 mm in length and features 61 or 63 pairs of legs. This species is found in northern Brazil.

== Discovery and distribution ==
This species was first described in 1994 by the biologists Luis Alberto Pereira, Alessandro Minelli, and Francesco Barbieri. They based the original description of this species on a male holotype and a female allotype, both collected by the biologist Joachim Adis in 1983. He found these specimens in a blackwater inundation forest (igapó) along the Tarumã Mirim River, about 20 km upstream from the city of Manaus, in the state of Amazonas in Brazil. The species name alludes to this type locality. Both type specimens are deposited in the Instituto Nacional de Pesquisas da Amazônia in Manaus. This species is known only from the type locality.

== Taxonomy ==
Pereira, Minelli, and Barbieri originally described this species in 1994 under the name Schendylurus amazonicus. In 1997, however, Pereira and the American zoologist Richard L. Hoffman moved this species to the genus Schendylops when they deemed Schendylurus to be a junior synonym for Schendylops. Accordingly, authorities now accept Schendylops amazonicus as the valid name for this species.

== Description ==
The male holotype features 61 pairs of legs and measures 27 mm in length and 0.7 mm in maximum width, whereas the female allotype features 63 leg pairs and measures 25 mm in length and 0.8 mm in maximum width. Both preserved specimens are yellowish. The dorsal plate on the head (cephalic plate) is slightly longer than wide, with a length/width ratio of 1.2. Each antenna is 5.0 to 5.2 times as long as the cephalic plate. The antennae feature small specialized setae with three distal branches not only on the ultimate article but also on the second, fifth, ninth, and thirteenth articles.

The clypeus features 14 setae on the anterior half, including six pairs of setae in the middle, followed by a pair of setae in front of the labrum. The labrum bears about 20 teeth in the middle that are dark and blunt, with four teeth on each side that are sharp and pointed. Each mandible features a pectinate lamella (comb blade) with about 23 hyaline teeth and a dentate lamella with 14 teeth divided into three blocks, with three teeth in each of the last two blocks. Lappets project from not only the telopodites but also the coxosternite of the first maxillae. The coxosternite of the first maxillae features three pairs of setae, and the coxosternite of the second maxillae features 39 setae. The dorsal edge of the claw at the distal end of each of the second maxillae features a comb with about 21 teeth, whereas the comb on the ventral edge features about 15 teeth. All articles of each forcipule lack teeth, but the inner margin of the first article features a small tubercle without pigment.

The sternites feature fields of pores in an uninterrupted series from the first to the antepenultimate leg-bearing segment. The pore fields are undivided on the anterior and posterior sternites but divided into two roughly symmetrical areas in the intermediate sternites. The pore fields are divided from the 27th sternite through the 52nd sternite. The last leg-bearing segment features pleurites next to the pretergite (the sclerite in front of the main tergite). The basal element of each of the ultimate legs (coxopleuron) features two pores hidden under the adjacent sternite. Each of the ultimate legs features seven articles with a minute tubercle and a small spine instead of a claw at the distal end.

This species exhibits traits that characterize the genus Schendylops. For example, as in other species of Schendylops, the claw on each of the second maxillae features both a dorsal comb and a ventral comb, and the sternites of at least some leg-bearing segments feature pore fields. Furthermore, as in other species of Schendylops, each of the ultimate legs features two pores on the coxopleuron and seven articles but no claw.

This species shares a distinctive set of traits with another Neotropical species in the same genus, S. borellii, which is found in Paraguay. For example, both of these species feature an uninterrupted series of pore fields from the first to the antepenultimate leg-bearing segment, with fields that are undivided on the anterior and posterior sternites but divided in the middle of the body. Furthermore, these species feature similar numbers of teeth on the dentate lamella of each mandible (with 12 to 15 in S. borellii), and each of these species features more than 55 pairs of legs. Moreover, the most distal article of the ultimate legs in the male of each of these species is not fusiform like a spindle.

These close relatives can be distinguished, however, based on other traits. For example, each antenna is 3.4 times as long as the cephalic plate in S. borellii but at least 5.0 times as long as the cephalic plate in S. amazonicus, and the middle of the clypeus features 10 pairs of setae in S. borellii but only six pairs of setae in S. amazonicus. Furthermore, the middle of the labrum features about 20 teeth in S. amazonicus but only 12 teeth in S. borellii, and the first article of the forcipule features a small tubercle in S. amazonicus but not in S. borellii. Moreover, the male of the species S. borellii features fewer legs (only 57 pairs) than recorded in S. amazonicus.
