= Schendylops varipictus =

Scientific classification
- Kingdom: Animalia
- Phylum: Arthropoda
- Subphylum: Myriapoda
- Class: Chilopoda
- Order: Geophilomorpha
- Family: Schendylidae
- Genus: Schendylops
- Species: S. varipictus

Binomial name
- Schendylops varipictus (Chamberlin, 1950)

Synonyms
- Schendylota varipicta Chamberlin, 1950

Species of centipede

Schendylops varipictus is a species of soil centipede in the family Schendylidae. This centipede features 39 to 43 pairs of legs and can reach 17 mm in length. This species is found in Puerto Rico, Guadeloupe, and Martinique.

== Discovery and distribution ==
This species was first described in 1950 by the American biologist Ralph V. Chamberlin. He based the original description of this species on four specimens, including three males and a juvenile (apparently female). These specimens were collected from three different locations in Puerto Rico, including the town of Adjuntas. These specimens are deposited in the National Museum of Natural History in Washington, D.C. After the original description of this species, two more specimens (both adult females) were found in dead wood on Basse-Terre Island in Guadeloupe in 1979, one specimen at Matouba in the commune of Sainte-Claude, the other in the commune of Goyave. More recently, this centipede has also been recorded on three different islands in Martinique.

== Taxonomy ==
Chamberlin originally described this species in 1950 under the name Schendylota varipicta. In 1985, the myriapodologists Jean-Marie Demange and Luis Alberto Pereira deemed Schendylota to be a junior synonym of Schendylurus and redescribed this species under the name Schendylurus varipictus. In 1997, Pereira and the American zoologist Richard L. Hoffman moved this species to the genus Schendylops when they deemed Schendylurus to be a junior synonym for Schendylops. Accordingly, authorities now accept Schendylops varipictus as the valid name for this species.

== Description ==
The males of this species feature 39 pairs of legs, whereas the females can feature either 41 or 43 leg pairs. The body can be yellow or greenish, with a black band running down the middle of the back and dark blotches on the sides, but sometimes the pigment is absent. The head, antennae, forcipules, and first twelve sternites are an orange shade of ochre. This centipede can reach 17 mm in length and 0.8 mm in width. Each antenna is about twice as long as the head. The head is shaped like an oval that is slightly longer than wide, with a length/width ratio of 1.2. The clypeus features a pair of setae behind the antennae, a single seta in a paler area in the center, a row of three setae on each side, and a pair of small setae in front of the labrum. The labrum bears ten to twelve blunt teeth in the middle, with five to seven pointed teeth that are much smaller on each side piece.

Each mandible bears eight teeth divided into three groups with two or three teeth in each group. Both edges of the claw at the distal end of each of the second maxillae feature a comb of filaments. When closed, the forcipules do not reach beyond the front of the head. Each article of the forcipule lacks teeth. The claw at the distal end of each forcipule is smooth. The forcipular sternum lacks lines of chitin.

The sternites feature fields of pores from the second segment through the antepenultimate segment, with two pores on the penultimate sternite of adult female specimens. The pore fields are nearly circular in shape. The sternite of the last leg-bearing segment is shaped like a trapezoid that is wider along the anterior margin than long. The basal element of each of the ultimate legs (coxopleuron) features two pores under the margin of the adjacent sternite. Each of the ultimate legs features seven articles (including the coxopleuron), with the terminal article much smaller than the others, ending with a tubercle bearing a stiff seta. The telson lacks anal pores.

This species exhibits traits that characterize the genus Schendylops. For example, as in other species of Schendylops, the claw on each of the second maxillae features both a dorsal comb and a ventral comb, and the sternites of at least some leg-bearing segments feature pore fields. Furthermore, as in other species of Schendylops, each of the ultimate legs features two pores on the coxopleuron and seven articles.

This species shares a more distinctive set of traits with two other species in the same genus, S. bakeri and S. lesnei, both found in Brazil. For example, each of these three species features an uninterrupted series of undivided pore fields starting from the second sternite and lasting through the antepenultimate sternite. Furthermore, the pore fields in each of these closely related species are almost circular in shape. Moreover, each article of the forcipule lacks teeth in all three species.

The species S. varipictus, however, can be distinguished from the other two species based on other traits. For example, the terminal article of each of the ultimate legs is much shorter than the penultimate article of the same leg in S. varipictus but about as long as the penultimate article of the same leg in the other two species. Furthermore, each of the other two species features more legs (47 pairs) than found in S. varipictus.
