= Schendylops oligopus =

Scientific classification
- Kingdom: Animalia
- Phylum: Arthropoda
- Subphylum: Myriapoda
- Class: Chilopoda
- Order: Geophilomorpha
- Family: Schendylidae
- Genus: Schendylops
- Species: S. oligopus

Binomial name
- Schendylops oligopus (Pereira, Minelli & Barbieri, 1995)

Synonyms
- Schendylurus oligopus Pereira, Minelli & Barbieri, 1995

Species of centipede

Schendylops oligopus is a species of soil centipede in the family Schendylidae. This species is notable as one of only two species in the order Geophilomorpha known to include centipedes with only 27 pairs of legs, the minimum number recorded in this order. Furthermore, S. oligopus was the first species in this order found to feature so few legs.

== Discovery ==
This species was first described in 1995 by the biologists Luis Alberto Pereira, Alessandro Minelli, and Francesco Barbieri. The original description of this species is based on a large sample, including a female holotype, a male allotype, nine paratypes (eight females and one male), and fourteen other specimens (thirteen females and one male). All specimens were collected in 1982 or 1983 from the Adolfo Ducke Forest Reserve in Amazonas state in Brazil. Pereira and his coauthors named the species oligopus in light of the small number of legs observed in these specimens: All the females had only 31 pairs of legs, and all three male specimens had only 29 pairs, the minimum number recorded at the time in the order Geophilomorpha and a number then shared by only two other species of centipede.

In 2000, Minelli, Pereira, Donatella Foddai, and John G.E. Lewis reported the collection of eleven more specimens (six males and five females) of S. oligopus in 1990. These specimens had the expected number of legs, except for one unusual male with only 27 leg pairs, the first specimen in the order Geophilomorpha recorded with so few legs. S. oligopus remained the only species in this order known to feature so few legs until the discovery of S. ramirezi, another species in the same genus, first described in 2013, with 27 leg pairs in males and 29 pairs in females.

== Taxonomy ==
Pereira, Minelli, and Barbieri originally described S. oligopus in 1995 under the name Schendylurus oligopus. In 1997, the American zoologist Richard L. Hoffman and Pereira moved this species to the genus Schendylops when they deemed Schendylurus to be a junior synonym for Schendylops. Accordingly, authorities now accept Schendylops oligopus as the valid name for this species.

== Description ==
All females of this species have 31 pairs of legs, and males usually have 29 leg pairs. In a large sample of 29 males, 35 females, and 13 juveniles of unknown sex, only one male was found to have 27 leg pairs. Females can reach 10 mm in length, and males can reach 8 mm in length. This centipede (preserved in alcohol) is a pale yellowish color.

Each antenna is about 2.4 times as long as the head. The fourth segment of each antenna is similar in length to the contiguous segments. The head is slightly longer than wide, with a length/width ratio of 1.1. The dentate lamella of each mandible is divided into three blocks (the first and second blocks each with three teeth and the third block with only two teeth). The pectinate lamella of each mandible features about 13 hyaline teeth. Small lappets project from the lateral margins of both the coxosternite and the telopodites of the first maxillae. The claw at the end of each of the second maxillae features both a dorsal comb and a ventral comb, each comb with about six or seven teeth. The forcipule features a small tubercle at the inner margin of the base of the ultimate article but no teeth on any article.

The sternites of the first leg-bearing segment and the most posterior segments lack fields of pores, but undivided pore fields appear on the sternites of segments 2 through 12, sometimes extending as far as segment 14. Both the sternite and the tergite of the last leg-bearing segment are shaped like trapezoids that are wider along the anterior margin than long. The basal element of each of the ultimate legs (coxopleuron) features two pores that are partly covered by the adjacent sternite. Each of the ultimate legs features seven articles and ends in a small tubercle with two small spines at the tip.

This species exhibits traits that characterize the genus Schendylops. For example, as in other species of Schendylops, the claw on each of the second maxillae features both a dorsal comb and a ventral comb, and the sternites of at least some leg-bearing segments feature pore fields. Furthermore, each of the ultimate legs feature two pores on the coxopleuron and seven articles but no claw.

The species S. oligopus shares an especially distinctive set of traits with S. ramirezi. For example, these two species feature similar numbers of legs, including at least some males with 27 leg pairs. Furthermore, both species feature pore fields that are limited to the anterior region of the body, with all pore fields undivided, but without a pore field on the sternite of the first leg-bearing segment. Moreover, in both species, the inner margin of the first article of the forcipule features no teeth, and the fourth segment of each antenna is similar in length to the contiguous segments.

The species S. oligopus and S. ramirezi can be distinguished, however, based on many other traits. For example, the dentate lamella on the mandibles is divided into three blocks in S. oligopus but not in S. ramirezi, the small tubercle at the end of the ultimate legs features two spines at the tip in S. oligopus but only one spines in S. ramirezi, and the pore fields on the sternites feature a few extra pores on each side at the anterior side of the field in S. ramirezi but not in S. oligopus. Furthermore, whereas S. ramirezi features setae on the coxosternite of the first maxillae and a large seta in the middle of the coxosternite of the second maxillae, all these setae are absent in S. oligopus. Moreover, while both species are small, S. oligopus is nevertheless larger than S. ramirezi: Females of the species S. ramirezi reach only 7 mm in length, and males reach only 6 mm in length.

== Distribution and habitat ==
This species has been found in four locations in Amazonas state in Brazil, including the type locality in the Adolfo Ducke Forest Reserve. Some specimens were collected in campinarana white-sand forest. Others were collected in burned secondary upland forest.
