= Schendylops australis =

Scientific classification
- Kingdom: Animalia
- Phylum: Arthropoda
- Subphylum: Myriapoda
- Class: Chilopoda
- Order: Geophilomorpha
- Family: Schendylidae
- Genus: Schendylops
- Species: S. australis

Binomial name
- Schendylops australis (Silvestri, 1907)

Synonyms
- Schendylurus australis Silvestri, 1907

Species of centipede

Schendylops australis is a species of soil centipede in the family Schendylidae. This centipede is found in South Africa. This species features 53 pairs of legs in each sex and can reach 35 mm in length.

== Discovery and distribution ==
This species was first described in 1907 by the Italian zoologist Filippo Silvestri. He based the original description of this species on a sample of specimens including both sexes. These specimens were collected by the German zoologist Hans Brauns from Port Elizabeth in the Eastern Cape province of South Africa. This species is known only from this type locality. Three syntypes collected in 1898, including a female lectotype and a male paralectotype, are deposited in the Zoological Museum of the University of Hamburg.

== Taxonomy ==
Silvestri originally described this species in 1907 under the name Schendylurus australis, placing this species in a new genus that he proposed to contain this new species. In 1997, however, the American zoologist Richard L. Hoffman and the Argentine myriapodologist Luis Alberto Pereira moved this species to the genus Schendylops when they deemed Schendylurus to be a junior synonym for Schendylops. Accordingly, authorities now accept Schendylops australis as the valid name for this species.

== Description ==
This species features 53 leg pairs in both sexes and can reach 35 mm in length and 1.3 mm in width. Specimens (preserved in alcohol) are yellowish, with the forcipular segment a pale shade of ochre. Each antenna is about 2.8 times as long as the dorsal plate on the head (cephalic plate). Each article of the antenna except the first is longer than wide. The cephalic plate is distinctly longer than wide, with a length/width ratio of 1.2. The clypeus features one pair of setae behind the antennae, about five pairs in the middle, and another pair in front of the labrum. The posterior margin of the labrum bears 22 teeth. The dentate lamellae on the mandibles are divided into blocks.

Small lappets project from both the coxosternite and the telopodites of the first maxillae, with those on the telopodites slightly larger. The coxosternite of the second maxillae features about 20 setae, but the coxosternite of the first maxillae lacks setae. The claw at the end of each of the second maxillae features two combs, one ventral and one dorsal, each with five or six teeth. Each of the first three articles of the forcipule features a small tubercle on the inner margin, but all articles lack teeth, and the inner margin of the ultimate article is smooth.

Fields of pores appear on the sternites from the first segment to the penultimate segment, with each field undivided. The anterior dorsal sclerite (pretergite) of the last leg-bearing segment is not fused to the adjacent pleurites. The basal element of each of the ultimate legs (coxopleuron) features two pores. The ventral surface of each of the ultimate legs features numerous setae, with a few on a base like a tubercle (in at least the male), but fewer setae appear on the dorsal surface. The male gonopod features two articles, with about 15 setae on the basal article, about 11 setae on the distal article, and some of these setae on a tubercle-like base.

This species exhibits traits that characterize the genus Schendylops. For example, as in other species of Schendylops, the claw on each of the second maxillae features both a dorsal comb and a ventral comb, and the sternites of at least some leg-bearing segments feature pore fields. Furthermore, as in other species of Schendylops, each of the ultimate legs features two pores on the coxopleuron.

This species shares an especially distinctive set of traits with another African species in the same genus, S. pumicosus, which is found in Ivory Coast. For example, in both of these species, pore fields appear all along the trunk, including all sternites from the second segment through the penultimate segment. Furthermore, in the males of both species, some setae emerge from a tubercle-like base on the ultimate legs and on the gonopods. Moreover, in both species, the coxosternite of the first maxillae lacks setae.

These two species can be distinguished, however, based on other traits. For example, the species S. pumicosis is larger, reaching 47 mm in length, and features more legs, with 63 to 69 pairs in males and 65 to 71 in females, than the species S. australis. Furthermore, the first sternite features a pore field in S. australis but not in S. pumicosus. Moreover, the ultimate article of the forcipule features a well developed tooth in S. pumicosis but not in S. australis, and the pretergite is completely fused with the adjacent pleurites on the last leg-bearing segment in S. pumicosis but not in S. australis.
