= Schendylops inquilinus =

Scientific classification
- Kingdom: Animalia
- Phylum: Arthropoda
- Subphylum: Myriapoda
- Class: Chilopoda
- Order: Geophilomorpha
- Family: Schendylidae
- Genus: Schendylops
- Species: S. inquilinus

Binomial name
- Schendylops inquilinus Pereira, Uliana & Minelli, 2007

Species of centipede

Schendylops inquilinus is a species of soil centipede in the family Schendylidae. This centipede is notable for featuring glands on its sternites with purple openings, a rare deviation from the pigmentation typically observed in this family. This species features 51 to 55 pairs of legs and can reach 31 mm in length. This centipede is found in termite mounds in central Brazil.

== Discovery and distribution ==
This species was first described in 2007 by the Argentine myriapodologist Luis Alberto Pereira and the Italian biologists Marco Uliana and Alessandro Minelli. They based the original description of this species on a large sample of specimens, including 34 females and 25 males. These specimens include a female holotype and 26 paratypes (15 females and 11 males). All specimens were collected in 2004 from termite mounds in the northern Pantanal wetland of the Brazilian state of Mato Grosso. The holotype and 13 paratypes are deposited in Museu de Zoologia da Universidade de São Paulo in Brazil, and five paratypes are deposited in the Museo de La Plata in Argentina. The species name is the Latin word for "lodger" and refers to the discovery of this centipede in termite mounds.

== Ecology ==
This species is found in a monodominant forest of Vochysiaceae in the Pantanal of Mato Grosso, one of the largest wetlands in the world, which lies in a depression formed by the Paraguay River and its tributaries. This centipede inhabits a floodplain on the right bank of the Cuiabá River and the left bank of the Bento Gomes River. This area is subject to floods as high as 1.5 meters annually between December and March. Authorities suspect that this centipede survives floods and avoids inundation by taking refuge in termite mounds, where specimens were collected in February above high water.

== Description ==
This species can reach 31 mm in length and 0.9 mm in width. Males feature 51 or 53 pairs of legs, whereas females feature 53 or 55 leg pairs. This centipede (preserved in alcohol) is mostly a pale brownish orange, but the head, forcipular segment, and the first ten to twelve leg-bearing segments are a bright reddish brown. The dorsal plate on top of the head (cephalic plate) is slightly longer than wide, with a length/width ratio of 1.1.

Each antenna is about 2.8 times longer than the cephalic plate. The first article of each antenna is wider than long, but all the other articles are longer than wide. The dorsal and ventral surfaces of the second, fifth, ninth, and thirteenth articles feature small specialized setae in a smooth hyaline area without pigment. These setae are specialized sense organs (sensilla) and include types that divide into two or three small branches at the distal end.

The clypeus features a pair of setae behind the antennae, a pair of setae in front of the labrum, and 10 pairs of setae in between the other two pairs. The labrum features 20 teeth, with about 11 dark and rounded teeth on the middle piece and sharp teeth on either side. Each mandible features a pectinate lamella (comb blade) with about 19 hyaline teeth and a dentate lamella with teeth divided into three blocks, each of the first two blocks with three teeth, and the third block with five to seven teeth. Large lappets project from not only the telopodites but also the coxosternite of the first maxillae. The coxosternite of the first maxillae features two pairs of setae but no groove down the middle. The dorsal and ventral edges of the claws at the distal end of the second maxillae each feature a comb with about 17 teeth. Each article of the forcipules lacks teeth.

The sternites feature purple glands and an uninterrupted series of fields of pores from the first leg-bearing segment through the penultimate leg-bearing segment. These pore fields are undivided on the anterior and posterior sternites but divided into two roughly symmetrical areas on the intermediate sternites. Some sternites feature a few additional pores on each side of the main pore area.

The last leg-bearing segment features pleurites next to the pretergite (the sclerite in front of the main tergite). The basal element of each of the ultimate legs (coxopleuron) features two pores hidden under the adjacent sternite. Each of the ultimate legs features seven articles with a tiny tubercle and a small spine instead of a claw at the distal end. The more proximal articles of each of the ultimate legs are wider than the more distal articles. For example, the penultimate article of each of the ultimate legs of the female is about 1.3 or 1.4 times as wide as the terminal article of the same leg.

This species exhibits traits that characterize the genus Schendylops. For example, as in other species of Schendylops, the claw on each of the second maxillae features both a dorsal comb and a ventral comb, and the sternites of at least some leg-bearing segments feature pore fields. Furthermore, as in other species of Schendylops, each of the ultimate legs features two pores on the coxopleuron and seven articles but no claw.

This species shares a distinctive set of traits with another Brazilian species in the same genus, S. coscaroni. For example, both of these species feature an uninterrupted series of pore fields from the first to the penultimate leg-bearing segment with fields that are undivided on the anterior and posterior sternites but divided in the middle of the body. Furthermore, both species feature some sternites with additional pores next to the main pore field, a coxosternite of the first maxillae with two pairs of setae but no groove down the middle, forcipules without any teeth on the most distal article, pleurites next to the pretergite of the last leg-bearing segment, and antennae with specialized sensilla on the second, fifth, ninth, and thirteenth articles.

These two species can be distinguished, however, based on other traits. For example, the sternal glands are purple in S. inquilinus but yellow in S. coscaroni, the clypeus features about 10 pairs of median setae in S. inquilinus but about 17 pairs of median setae in S. coscaroni, and each edge of the claws of the second maxillae bears about 17 teeth in S. inquilinus but about 25 teeth in S. coscaroni. Furthermore, each sex in S. coscaroni features fewer leg pairs (49 in males and 51 in females), and the terminal article of each the ultimate legs is more slender in S. coscaroni (about half as wide as the penultimate article of the same leg in the female), than in S. inquilinus.
