= Schendylops attemsi =

Scientific classification
- Kingdom: Animalia
- Phylum: Arthropoda
- Subphylum: Myriapoda
- Class: Chilopoda
- Order: Geophilomorpha
- Family: Schendylidae
- Genus: Schendylops
- Species: S. attemsi

Binomial name
- Schendylops attemsi (Verhoeff, 1900)

Synonyms
- Schendyla attemsii Verhoeff, 1900

Species of centipede

Schendylops attemsi is a species of soil centipede in the family Schendylidae. This centipede features from 57 to 61 pairs of legs and is notable for its large size, reaching 63 mm in length. This species is found in Algeria and Morocco.

== Discovery and distribution ==
This species was first described in 1900 by the German zoologist Karl W. Verhoeff based on one male specimen and one female specimen. The German zoologist Julius Vosseler found these specimens in the commune of Saïda, now in the province of Saïda but formerly in the province of Oran, in Algeria. After the original description of this species, another specimen was found on Ras Foura'al in the Beni Snassen mountains of Morocco and described in 1912 as a female but later found to be male. More recently, another male specimen was found 32 km from the town of Kasba Tadla in Morocco and described in 1995.

== Taxonomy ==
Verhoeff originally described this species in 1900 under the name Schendyla attemsii. In 1911, however, the French naturalist Henri Ribaut moved this species to a different genus as Schendylurus attemsi. In 1997, the zoologists Luis Alberto Pereira and Richard L. Hoffman moved this species to the genus Schendylops when they deemed Schendylurus to be a junior synonym for Schendylops. Accordingly, authorities now accept Schendylops attemsi as the valid name for this species.

== Description ==
Males of this species feature only 57 pairs of legs and can reach 58 mm in length, whereas females can feature as many as 61 leg pairs and reach 63 mm in length. The dorsal plate on the head (cephalic plate) is slightly longer than wide, with a length/width ratio of 1.2. Each antenna is 3.5 times longer than the head, with each article of the antenna except the first longer than wide. Each antenna features specialized setae, including some that are darker, like ochre, on the dorsal surface of the second, fifth, ninth, and thirteenth articles. The clypeus features a pair of setae behind the antennae, followed by about 33 to 35 setae in a transverse band in the middle, but no setae appear in front of the labrum. The labrum bears from 18 to 30 teeth, with six to ten blunt teeth in the middle that are dark and six to ten teeth on each side that are sharper and longer.

The mandible features a pectinate lamella (comb blade) with about 27 hyaline teeth and a dentate lamella with nine or ten teeth divided into three or four blocks. Well developed lappets project from not only the telopodites but also the coxosternite of the first maxillae. The coxosternite of the first maxillae features about 11 setae, whereas the coxosternite of the second maxillae features about 28 to 33 setae. The claw at the distal end of each of the second maxillae features a comb on the dorsal edge and another on the ventral edge, with about 22 teeth on the ventral comb and about 27 teeth on the dorsal comb. The first article of the forcipules either lacks teeth or bears only a very small tooth on the internal edge, and the most distal article of the forcipules lacks teeth and features a claw with a smooth inner edge. The calyx of the poison gland in the forcipules is long and cylindrical.

The ventral surface of the walking legs features numerous setae. The sternites feature undivided fields of pores in an uninterrupted series on the anterior leg-bearing segments. This series begins on the second sternite and extends through the 39th sternite and sometimes as far as the 52nd sternite. The sternite of the last leg-bearing segment is shaped like a trapezoid with an anterior margin that is wider than the posterior margin and as wide or only slightly wider than the sternite is long.

The last leg-bearing segment features pleurites next to the pretergite (the sclerite in front of the main tergite). The basal element of each of the ultimate legs (coxopleuron) features two pores hidden under the adjacent sternite. The ultimate legs are markedly swollen in the male. Each of the ultimate legs features seven articles with the terminal article much more slender than the penultimate article. In the male, for example, the penultimate article is 4.6 times wider than the terminal article of the ultimate legs. Instead of a claw at the distal end of each of the ultimate legs, there is a small tubercle bearing four to six spines.

This species exhibits traits that characterize the genus Schendylops. For example, as in other species of Schendylops, the claw on each of the second maxillae features both a dorsal comb and a ventral comb, and the sternites of at least some leg-bearing segments feature pore fields. Furthermore, as in other species of Schendylops, each of the ultimate legs features two pores on the coxopleuron and seven articles but no claw.

This species shares an especially distinctive set of traits with another African species in the same genus, S. maroccanus, which is also found in Algeria and Morocco. For example, both species feature ochraceous specialized setae on the antennae, feature mandibles with a dentate lamella divided into distinct blocks, lack teeth on the most distal article of the forcipule, and lack pore fields on the first sternite and on the sternites at the posterior end of the body. Furthermore, both species feature a calyx of the poison gland in the forcipules that is long and cylindrical, setae on the coxosternite of the first maxillae, and numerous setae on the ventral surface of the walking legs.

These two species can be distinguished, however, based on other traits. For example, the species S. maroccanus features ochraceous specialized setae on fewer articles of the antennae (only the ninth and thirteenth articles), more teeth on the labrum (about 60 teeth), more setae on the coxosternite of the second maxillae (about 60 setae), and pore fields on a more limited number of sternites (from the second through the 21st sternite at most) than recorded in the species S. attemsi. Furthermore, the first article of the forcipule features a prominent tooth in S. maroccanus but not in S. attemsi, the pleurites are completely fused with the last pretergite in S. maroccanus but not in S. attemsi, the ultimate legs are swollen in the male in S. attemsi but not in S. maroccanus, and the tubercle at the distal end of the ultimate legs features at least four spines in S. attemsi but only two spines in S. maroccanus.
