= Australoschendyla capensis =

Scientific classification
- Kingdom: Animalia
- Phylum: Arthropoda
- Subphylum: Myriapoda
- Class: Chilopoda
- Order: Geophilomorpha
- Family: Schendylidae
- Genus: Australoschendyla
- Species: A. capensis

Binomial name
- Australoschendyla capensis R.E.Jones, 1996

Species of centipede

Australoschendyla capensis is a species of centipede in the Schendylidae family. It is endemic to Australia, and was first described in 1996 by R. E. Jones.

== Description ==
This species has 41 or 43 trunk segments and can reach 13 mm in length.

== Distribution ==
The species occurs in coastal north-western Western Australia. The type locality is the North West Cape peninsula.

== Behaviour ==
The centipedes are solitary terrestrial predators that inhabit plant litter and soil.
