= Schendylops =

Scientific classification
- Kingdom: Animalia
- Phylum: Arthropoda
- Subphylum: Myriapoda
- Class: Chilopoda
- Order: Geophilomorpha
- Family: Schendylidae
- Genus: Schendylops; Cook, 1899

Type species
- Schendyla grandidieri (Saussure and Zehntner, 1897)

Synonyms
- Koepckeiella Kraus, 1954; Nesondyla Chamberlin, 1950; Schendylota Chamberlin, 1950; Schendylurus Silvestri, 1907; Schendylurus (Ploutoschendylurus) Brölemann & Ribaut, 1912

Genus of centipedes

Schendylops is the largest genus of centipedes in the family Schendylidae, containing more than 60 species. Most species in this genus are found in the Neotropical realm, but some species are found in Africa. This distribution indicates that this genus evolved before the Atlantic Ocean formed in the Mesozoic Era.

== Distribution and habitats ==
Centipedes in this genus are found in most of the Neotropical region, including the West Indies, and most of Africa, including Madagascar. Seven species are found on the African mainland, and five species are found on the island of Madagascar, but all the other species are Neotropical. The Neotropical species are found not only on the mainland of South America, including Colombia, Venezuela, Guyana, Suriname, French Guiana, Ecuador, Peru, Bolivia, Brazil, Paraguay, and Argentina, but also on the Galápagos Islands and on Caribbean islands, including Puerto Rico, the British Virgin Islands, and Guadeloupe and Martinique in the French Antilles. Species of Schendylops live in diverse habitats, ranging from sea level (e.g., in the Caribbean region) to high elevations, e.g., at 4,500 m (14,800 ft) in the Andes mountains.

== Taxonomy ==
This genus was first proposed by the American biologist Orator F. Cook in 1899 for the type species originally named Schendyla grandidieri in 1897. In the decades that followed, however, authorities largely ignored or neglected this genus, instead using other genera to contain new species. For example, in 1907, the Italian zoologist Filippo Silvestri ignored Schendylops and instead introduced Schendylurus as a new genus to contain the newly discovered species S. australis, which he described and designated as the type species. In 1912, the French zoologists Henri W. Brölemann and Henri Ribaut not only accepted Schendylurus as a genus but also described Ploutoschendylurus as a new subgenus in that genus. Furthermore, in 1950, the American biologist Ralph V. Chamberlin introduced Nesondyla as a new genus to contain the newly discovered species N. neolota, which he described and designated as the type species. In 1997, however, the zoologists Richard L. Hoffman and Luis A. Pereira deemed not only Schendylurus but also Ploutoschendylurus and Nesondyla be junior synonyms for Schendylops. Accordingly, two other genus names, Koepckeiella and Schendylota, which had previously been deemed to be junior synonyms for Schendylurus, also became junior synonyms for Schendylops.

== Description ==
Centipedes in this genus feature second maxillae that each end in a claw fringed by two rows of filaments, one on the dorsal edge and the other on the ventral edge. The pleurites of the second maxillae are not fused to the adjacent coxosternite. The sternites feature fields of pores on at least some leg-bearing segments. The basal element of each of the ultimate legs (coxopleuron) features two pores. These pores connect to coxal organs with a simple structure (with each pore connecting to a single gland through a single duct that does not branch) rather than a composite structure (with multiple ducts from distinct glands converging to connect to each pore). Each of the ultimate legs features seven segments and a distal end without a claw, which is either absent or replaced by a small spine or a tubercle.

Species in this genus range from 1 to 7 cm (0.39 to 2.76 in) in length and have from 27 to 87 pairs of legs. Females of the African species S. caledonicus have from 81 to as many as 87 pairs, the maximum recorded in this genus. This species is also notable for its large size, reaching 65 mm (2.6 in) in length. Other species in this genus noted for their large size include the Brazilian species S. demelloi and S. gounellei, which can each reach 70 mm (2.8 in) in length.

This genus includes the two species that feature the fewest legs (27 pairs) in the order Geophilomorpha. Both of these species are found in Brazil: males in the species S. ramirezi have only 27 pairs of legs, while females have 29, and males in the species S. oligopus have 27 or 29 (usually 29), while females have 31. Furthermore, S. ramirezi is one of only two species in this order in which females have only 29 leg pairs (the other species, Dinogeophilus oligopodus, has 29 in each sex). Both S. ramirezi and S. oligopus are also notable for their small sizes, reaching only 7 mm and 10 mm in length, respectively.

== Phylogeny ==
A phylogenetic analysis of the order Geophilomorpha using both molecular data and morphology places a representative of the genus Schendylops (S. pampeanus) in a clade with a representative of Pectiniunguis, another genus in the family Schendylidae. This phylogenetic tree suggiests that the genera Schendylops and Pectiniunguis are more closely related to one another than any other genera included in this analysis. These two close relatives form a sister group for another genus in the same family, Nannophilus, which emerges as the next closest relative included in this analysis.

The closely related genera Schendylops and Pectiniunguis share an extensive set of traits. For example, both of these genera feature claws on the second maxillae with rows of filaments on the dorsal and ventral edges, second maxillae with pleurites not fused to the posterior border of the coxosternite, and sternites with pore fields on at least some segments. Furthermore, both genera feature ultimate legs with two pores on each coxopleuron but no claw, which is either absent or replaced by a small spine or tubercle. These two genera can be distinguished, however, based on the coxal organs of the coxopleuron, which have a simple structure in Schendylops but a composite structure in Pectiniunguis.

== Species ==
This genus includes the following species:

- Schendylops achalensis Pereira, 2008
- Schendylops amazonicus (Pereira, Minelli & Barbieri, 1994)
- Schendylops anamariae (Pereira, 1981)
- Schendylops andesicola (Chamberlin, 1957)
- Schendylops attemsi (Verhoeff, 1900)
- Schendylops australis (Silvestri, 1907)
- Schendylops bakeri (Chamberlin, 1914)
- Schendylops bolivianus (Silvestri, 1897)
- Schendylops borellii (Silvestri, 1895)
- Schendylops brasilianus (Silvestri, 1897)
- Schendylops caledonicus (Attems, 1928)
- Schendylops colombianus (Chamberlin, 1921)
- Schendylops continuus (Pereira, Minelli & Barbieri, 1995)
- Schendylops coscaroni (Pereira & Minelli, 1996)
- Schendylops demangei (Pereira, 1981)
- Schendylops demartini (Pereira & Minelli, 1996)
- Schendylops demelloi (Verhoeff, 1938)
- Schendylops dentifer (Chamberlin, 1957)
- Schendylops edentatus (Kraus, 1957)
- Schendylops elegantulus (Meinert, 1886)
- Schendylops fieldi (Chamberlin, 1944)
- Schendylops gounellei (Brölemann, 1902)
- Schendylops gracilis (Attems, 1934)
- Schendylops grandidieri (Saussure & Zehntner, 1897)
- Schendylops grismadoi Pereira, 2015
- Schendylops iguapensis (Verhoeff, 1938)
- Schendylops inquilinus Pereira, Uliana & Minelli, 2007
- Schendylops insolitus (Lawrence, 1960)
- Schendylops interfluvius (Pereira, 1984)
- Schendylops janauarius (Pereira, Minelli & Barbieri, 1995)
- Schendylops janelao Nunes, Chagas-Jr & Bichuette, 2019
- Schendylops jeekeli Pereira, 2009
- Schendylops labbanus (Chamberlin, 1921)
- Schendylops lesnei (Brölemann & Ribaut, 1911)
- Schendylops lomanus (Chamberlin, 1957)
- Schendylops longitarsis (Silvestri, 1895)
- Schendylops luederwaldi (Brölemann & Ribaut, 1911)
- Schendylops madariagensis (Pereira, 1981)
- Schendylops marchantariae (Pereira, Minelli & Barbieri, 1995)
- Schendylops maroccanus (Attems, 1903)
- Schendylops mascarenicus (Lawrence, 1960)
- Schendylops mesopotamicus (Pereira, 1981)
- Schendylops minutus (Pereira & Minelli, 1993)
- Schendylops nealotus (Chamberlin, 1950)
- Schendylops oligopus (Pereira, Minelli & Barbieri, 1995)
- Schendylops olivaceus (Crabill, 1972)
- Schendylops pallidus (Kraus, 1955)
- Schendylops pampeanus (Pereira & Coscarón, 1976)
- Schendylops paolettii (Pereira & Minelli, 1993)
- Schendylops paraguayensis (Silvestri, 1895)
- Schendylops parahybae (Chamberlin, 1914)
- Schendylops paucidens (Attems, 1939)
- Schendylops paucispinus (Lawrence, 1960)
- Schendylops paulista (Brölemann, 1905)
- Schendylops perditus (Chamberlin, 1914)
- Schendylops peruanus (Turk, 1955)
- Schendylops placii (Pereira & Minelli, 1996)
- Schendylops polypus Attems, 1928
- Schendylops potosius (Chamberlin, 1956)
- Schendylops pumicosus (Demange, 1963)
- Schendylops ramirezi Pereira, 2013
- Schendylops schubarti Pereira, Foddai & Minelli, 2002
- Schendylops silvicola (Lawrence, 1960)
- Schendylops sublaevis (Meinert, 1870)
- Schendylops titicacaensis (Kraus, 1954)
- Schendylops tropicus (Brölemann & Ribaut, 1911)
- Schendylops turmalina Calvanese & Brescovit, 2019
- Schendylops varipictus (Chamberlin, 1950)
- Schendylops verhoeffi (Brölemann & Ribaut, 1911)
- Schendylops virgingordae (Crabill, 1960)
