= Australoschendyla albanyensis =

Scientific classification
- Kingdom: Animalia
- Phylum: Arthropoda
- Subphylum: Myriapoda
- Class: Chilopoda
- Order: Geophilomorpha
- Family: Schendylidae
- Genus: Australoschendyla
- Species: A. albanyensis

Binomial name
- Australoschendyla albanyensis R.E.Jones, 1996

Species of centipede

Australoschendyla albanyensis is a species of centipede in the Schendylidae family. It is endemic to Australia, and was first described in 1996 by R. E. Jones.

== Description ==
This species can reach 15 mm in length. Males of this species have 45 pairs of legs; females have 47 leg pairs.

== Distribution ==
The species occurs in coastal south-western Western Australia. The type locality is Bald Head, Albany.

== Behaviour ==
The centipedes are solitary terrestrial predators that inhabit plant litter and soil.
