= Schendylops ramirezi =

Scientific classification
- Kingdom: Animalia
- Phylum: Arthropoda
- Subphylum: Myriapoda
- Class: Chilopoda
- Order: Geophilomorpha
- Family: Schendylidae
- Genus: Schendylops
- Species: S. ramirezi

Binomial name
- Schendylops ramirezi Pereira, 2013

Species of centipede

Schendylops ramirezi is a species of soil centipede in the family Schendylidae. This centipede is notable as the species with the fewest legs recorded in the order Geophilomorpha for each sex (27 pairs of legs for males, 29 leg pairs for females). This species is also the smallest in the genus Schendylops, reaching only 7 mm (0.28 in) in length.

Only one species of soil centipede other than S. ramirezi, is known to include centipedes with only 27 pairs of legs: Schendylops oligopus. Males of the species S. oligopus have 27 or 29 leg pairs, whereas females of this species have 31 pairs. These males, however, usually have 29 leg pairs and rarely have only 27 pairs. In a large sample of 31 males, only one specimen had only 27 leg pairs.

Furthermore, only one species of soil centipede other than S. ramirez is known to include females with only 29 leg pairs: Dinogeophilus oligopodus, with 29 leg pairs in both sexes. Thus, only S. ramirezi features the minimum number of legs recorded in the order Geophilomorpha for males as well as for females. Only six species in the order Geophilomorpha, including S. ramirezi, S. oligopus, and D. oligopodus, are known to feature centipedes with only 29 leg pairs.

== Discovery and distribution ==
This species was first described in 2013 by the Argentine myriapodologist Luis Alberto Pereira of the Universidad Nacional de La Plata based on specimens found on Ilha Grande in the state of Rio de Janeiro in 1999 in Brazil. All specimens were collected in the Atlantic rainforest biome. These specimens include a female holotype, five paratypes (three males and two females), and nineteen other specimens (fifteen females and four males), including five subadults and fourteen juveniles. The species is named for the Argentine arachnologist Martin Javier Ramirez of the Museo Argentino de Ciencias Naturales in Buenos Aires, who collected all the specimens. These specimens are deposited at the Museu de Zoologia da Universidade de São Paulo. This species is known only from the type locality.

== Description ==
This species exhibits sexual dimorphism in leg number: All seven male specimens have only 27 leg pairs, and all eighteen female specimens have only 29 pairs. This centipede (preserved in alcohol) has a pale yellowish color. Females of this species reach 7 mm (0.28 in) in length, whereas males reach only 6 mm (0.24 in) in length. Given the small size of these tiny centipedes, the original description refers to S. ramirezi as a "dwarf species."

Each antenna is notably short, only about 2.4 times as long as the head. The fourth segment of each antenna is similar in length to the contiguous segments. The head is slightly longer than wide, with a length/width ratio of 1.2. The dentate lamella on the mandible features about eight or nine teeth and is not divided into blocks. The pectinate lamella on the mandible features about eleven or twelve teeth. The coxosternite of the first maxillae features a pair of setae, with one on each side. Lappets project from both the coxosternite and the telopodites of the first maxillae. The coxosternite of the second maxillae features a large seta in the middle. The claw at the end of each of the second maxillae features a dorsal comb with six teeth and a ventral comb with four teeth. The forcipule features a small pale rounded prominence at the base of the ultimate article but no teeth on any articles.

The sternites of the first leg-bearing segment and the most posterior segments lack fields of pores, but pore fields appear on the sternites of segments 2 through 13, sometimes extending as far as segment 15. The pore field on each of these sternites is undivided, but one or two extra pores appear on one or both sides at the anterior side the field. Both the sternite and the tergite of the last leg-bearing segment are shaped like trapezoids that are wider than long. The basal element of each of the ultimate legs (coxopleuron) features two pores that are mostly covered by the adjacent sternite. Each of the ultimate legs features seven articles and ends in a tubercle with a small spine at the tip.

This species exhibits traits that characterize the genus Schendylops. For example, as in other species of Schendylops, the claw on each of the second maxillae features both a dorsal comb and a ventral comb, and the sternites of at least some leg-bearing segments feature pore fields. Furthermore, each of the ultimate legs feature two pores on the coxopleuron and seven articles but no claw.

The species S. ramirezi shares an especially distinctive set of traits with S. oligopus. For example, these two species feature similar numbers of legs, including males with 27 leg pairs. Furthermore, both species feature pore fields that are limited to the anterior region of the body, with all pore fields undivided, but without a pore field on the sternite of the first leg-bearing segment. Moreover, in both species, the inner margin of the first article of the forcipule features no teeth, and the fourth segment of each antenna is similar in length to the contiguous segments.

The species S. ramirez and S. oligopus can be distinguished, however, based on many other traits. For example, the dentate lamella on the mandibles is divided into three blocks in S. oligopus but not in S. ramirezi, the small tubercle at the end of the ultimate legs features one spine at the tip in S. ramirezi but two spines in S. oligopus, and the pore fields on the sternites feature a few extra pores on each side at the anterior side of the field in S. ramirezi but not in S. oligopus. Furthermore, whereas S. ramirezi features setae on the coxosternite of the first maxillae and a large seta in the middle of the coxosternite of the second maxillae, all these setae are absent in S. oligopus. Moreover, while both species are small, S. oligopus is nevertheless larger than S. ramirezi: Females of the species S. oligopus can reach 10 mm in length, and males can reach 8 mm in length.
