= Schendylops turmalina =

Scientific classification
- Kingdom: Animalia
- Phylum: Arthropoda
- Subphylum: Myriapoda
- Class: Chilopoda
- Order: Geophilomorpha
- Family: Schendylidae
- Genus: Schendylops
- Species: S. turmalina

Binomial name
- Schendylops turmalina Calvanese & Brescovit, 2019

Species of centipede

Schendylops turmalina is a species of soil centipede in the family Schendylidae. This centipede is notable as the first schendylid species recorded with a blue body, a rare deviation from the pigmentation typically observed in this family. This species can reach 42 mm in length and features 51 pairs of legs in males and 53 leg pairs in females. This centipede is found in southeastern Brazil.

== Discovery and distribution ==
This species was first described in 2019 by the biologists Victor C. Calvanese and Antonio D. Brescovit. The original description of this species is based on seven specimens (four females and three males), including a female holotype and five paratypes (three males and two females), all collected from leaf litter in the Atlantic Forest biome of southeastern Brazil in 2018. The six type specimens were found at an elevation of about 2,300 meters in Serra dos Orgãos National Park in the county of Teresópolis in the state of Rio de Janeiro in Brazil. The other female specimen was found at an elevation of about 1,500 meters in Caparaó National Park in the county of Alto Caparaó in the Brazilian state of Minas Gerais. All seven specimens are deposited in the Instituto Butantan in the city of São Paulo in Brazil. The species name is the Portuguese word for tourmaline and alludes to the blue hue of this centipede. The tourmaline found in the Brazilian state of Paraiba is a mineral with a similar blue hue. This species is known only from the Brazilian states of Rio de Janeiro and Minas Gerais.

== Description ==
Males of this species feature 51 pairs of legs and can reach 22 mm in length, whereas females feature 53 leg pairs and can reach 42 mm in length. Most of the body features a blue tone, but the head and forcipular segment are reddish brown, the legs are brown, and in adults, the tergites are olive green. In adult females, the first nine leg-bearing segments are reddish brown with light bluish sides, and the last leg-bearing segment is pale yellow but slightly bluish on the bottom and sides. The dorsal plate on the head (cephalic plate) is longer than wide, with a length/width ratio of about 1.2.

This species exhibits sexual dimorphism in the morphology of the antennae. These sexually dimorphic antennae are unusual among soil centipedes. For example, the antennae in this species are longer in females (about 2.4 times as long as the cephalic plate) than in males (about 2.1 times as long as the cephalic plate). Furthermore, in females, all articles of each antenna are longer than wide except the first, which is wider than long in both sexes, whereas in males, the second and third articles are about as wide as long, and the other articles are wider than long, except for the ultimate article, which is longer than wide in both sexes. The antennae in each sex feature special sensilla not only on the ultimate article but also on the second, fifth, ninth, and thirteenth articles.

The clypeus features a pair of setae behind the antennae but in front of 13 median setae, which are followed by a pair of setae in front of the labrum. The labrum bears 16 teeth in the middle part and four or five teeth on each side piece. Each mandible features a pectinate lamella (comb blade) with about 25 hyaline teeth and a dentate lamella with 16 teeth divided into three blocks, with three teeth in each of the first two blocks. Lappets project from not only the telopodites but also the coxosternite of the first maxillae. The coxosternite of the first maxillae features two pairs of setae but no groove down the middle. The dorsal edge of the claw at the distal end of each of the second maxillae features a comb with 16 to 18 teeth, whereas the comb on the ventral edge features 18 or 19 teeth. All articles of the forcipules lack teeth, but the inner margin of the claw at the distal end of each forcipule is serrated with about nine protuberances.

Adults feature blue fields of pores on the sternites in an uninterrupted series from the first to the penultimate leg-bearing segment. The pore fields in adults are undivided on the anterior and posterior sternites but divided into two roughly symmetrical areas in the intermediate sternites. The last leg-bearing segment features pleurites next to the pretergite (the sclerite in front of the main tergite). The main sternite of the last leg-bearing segment is shaped like a trapezoid with an anterior margin that is wider than the posterior margin and wider than the sternite is long.

The basal element of each of the ultimate legs (coxopleuron) in adults features two pores partially hidden under the adjacent sternite. Each of the ultimate legs normally features seven articles with the more proximal articles wider than the more distal articles. For example, the penultimate article of each of the ultimate legs of the female is about 1.5 times as wide as the terminal article of the same leg. The terminal article of each of the ultimate legs features a tubercle at the distal end. This tubercle features two pores and is flanked by a nearby pair of large sensilla.

This species exhibits traits that characterize the genus Schendylops. For example, as in other species of Schendylops, the claw on each of the second maxillae features both a dorsal comb and a ventral comb, and the sternites of at least some leg-bearing segments feature pore fields. Furthermore, as in other species of Schendylops, each of the ultimate legs in adults features two pores on the coxopleuron and seven articles but no claw.

This species shares a distinctive set of traits with another species in the same genus, S. coscaroni, which is also found in the Atlantic Forest in Brazil. For example, both of these species feature an uninterrupted series of pore fields from the first to the penultimate leg-bearing segment with fields that are undivided on the anterior and posterior sternites but divided in the middle of the body. Furthermore, both species feature a coxosternite of the first maxillae with two pairs of setae but no groove down the middle, forcipules without any teeth at the base of the most distal article, and pleurites next to the pretergite of the last leg-bearing segment. Moreover, the antennae in both species are more stout in males than in females and feature specialized sensilla on the second, fifth, ninth, and thirteenth articles.

These two close relatives can be distinguished, however, based on other traits. For example, the body is mostly a blue hue in S. turmalina but a reddish brown in S. coscaroni, the clypeus features about seven pairs of median setae in S. turmalina but about 17 pairs of median setae in S. coscaroni, each edge of the claws of the second maxillae bears about 18 teeth in S. turmalina but about 25 teeth in S. coscaroni, and the inner margin of the claw on the forcipules is serrated in S. turmalina but not in S. coscaroni. Furthermore, some sternites feature a few additional pores next to the main pore area in S. coscaroni but not in S. turmanlina, the penultimate article on each of the ultimate legs of the female is about twice as wide as the terminal article of the same leg in S. coscaroni but only about 1.5 times as wide as the terminal article in S. turmalina, and the tubercle at the distal end of each of the ultimate legs bears a small spine in S. coscaroni but features two pores and is flanked by a pair of large sensilla in S. turmalina. Moreover, each sex in S. coscaroni features fewer legs (49 in the male and 51 in the female) than recorded in S. turmalina.
