= Australoschendyla =

Scientific classification
- Kingdom: Animalia
- Phylum: Arthropoda
- Subphylum: Myriapoda
- Class: Chilopoda
- Order: Geophilomorpha
- Family: Schendylidae
- Genus: Australoschendyla; R.E.Jones, 1996

Type species
- Australoschendyla capensis Jones,1996

Genus of centipedes

Australoschendyla is a genus of soil centipedes in the family Schendylidae. This genus was described by the English myriapodologist Richard E. Jones in 1996. Centipedes in this genus feature claws on the second maxillae fringed by a single row of filaments, short forcipules, nearly circular fields of pores on the sternites, one or two pores on the basal element of each of the ultimate legs, and ultimate legs without claws. These centipedes range from 1 cm to 2 cm in length, have 41 to 47 pairs of legs, and are found in west Australia.

== Species ==
There are two valid species:

- Australoschendyla albanyensis Jones, 1996
- Australoschendyla capensis Jones, 1996
