= Plesioschendyla =

Scientific classification
- Kingdom: Animalia
- Phylum: Arthropoda
- Subphylum: Myriapoda
- Class: Chilopoda
- Order: Geophilomorpha
- Family: Schendylidae
- Genus: Plesioschendyla; Ribaut, 1923

Type species
- Plesioschendyla confossa Ribaut, 1923

Genus of centipedes

Plesioschendyla is a monotypic genus of centipedes in the family Schendylidae. It is endemic to New Caledonia, a French overseas territory in Melanesia. Its sole species is Plesioschendyla confossa. It was described by French entomologist Henri Ribaut in 1923.

== Description ==
This species features claws on the second maxillae without projections, mandibular dentate lamellae with small teeth, sternal pores in a transverse band, a single pore on each coxopleuron, and ultimate legs that are swollen in the male and lack claws. The original description of this species is based on six specimens reaching 35 mm in length, including four males with 43 to 53 pairs of legs and two females with 51 or 55 leg pairs.

== Distribution ==
The species occurs on the main island of Grande Terre. The type locality is Mont Ignambi.
