= Alessandro Minelli (biologist) =

Italian biologist (born 1948)

- Born: 20 December 1948 (age 77); Treviso, Italy
- Education: University of Padova 1966–1970
- Known for: Evo-devo
- Scientific career
- Fields: Zoology, evo-devo
- Workplaces: University of Padova

Alessandro Minelli (born 20 December 1948) is an Italian biologist, formerly a professor of zoology in the Faculty of Mathematical, Physical and Natural Sciences of the University of Padova, mainly working on evo-devo subjects.

== Biography ==
Alessandro Minelli studied Natural Sciences at the University of Padova 1966–70 with a master's degree in 1970. From 1987 to 2011, Minelli was a Full Professor of Zoology at the University of Padova.

== Activity in international organisations ==
- International Commission on Zoological Nomenclature (member since 1989, president 1995–2001)
- European Society for Evolutionary Biology (vice-president 1997–99)
- Editorial activity in several zoological journals.

== Academic memberships ==
- Accademia Nazionale delle Scienze, detta dei LX
- Accademia Nazionale Italiana di Entomologia
- Istituto Veneto di Scienze Lettere ed Arti
- Istituto Lombardo Accademia di Scienze e Lettere
- Accademia Olimpica
- Ateneo di Treviso
- Honorary Fellow of the Accademia Gioenia di Catania.
- Honorary Fellow of the Royal Entomological Society of London.

== Scientific contributions ==
Minelli is known for his studies in evolutionary developmental biology, or evo-devo. His main contributions are about the conceptual foundations of this discipline. In his search for an intellectual framework common to evolutionary biology and developmental biology, he has strongly argued against the widespread adultocentrism, that is, interpreting development, in a more or less distinct teleological vein, as a process targeted to the production of an adult animal or plant. At variance with the most popular trend in evo-devo, which is based on comparative developmental genetics and has a clear focus on early stages of embryonic development, the approach defended by Minelli is strongly rooted in comparative morphology and aims to extend to postembryonic development. His approach is based on revisiting the traditional concepts of homology. According to Minelli, the homology relationships between two structures is necessarily limited to selected features of those structures, thus requiring the adoption of a factorial or combinatorial concept of homology.

Minelli has introduced new concepts, such as axis paramorphism (useful for understanding the evolutionary relationships between the main axis of the body and its appendages) and those of eosegment and merosegment, through which he suggests a radical revisitation of the architecture of the body of segmented animals. Minelli has also explored the implication of evo-devo for biological systematics, speciation and the evolution of life cycles.

== Publications ==
=== Books ===
- Minelli A. – Plant Evolutionary Developmental Biology. Cambridge: Cambridge University Press (2018).
- Minelli A. – Perspectives in Animal Phylogeny and Evolution. xiii+345 pp. Oxford: Oxford University Press (Jan. 2009)
- Minelli A. – Forms of Becoming. 242 pp. Princeton: Princeton University Press (April 2009). [Italian: Forme del divenire. xiii+218 pp. Einaudi, Torino (2007)]
- Minelli A. & Fusco G. (eds.) Evolving Pathways. Key Themes in Evolutionary Developmental Biology. xviii+426 pp. Cambridge: Cambridge University Press (2008).
- Minelli A., Ortalli G. & Sanga G. (eds.) – Animal Names. Venezia: Istituto Veneto di Scienze Lettere ed Arti. ix+574 pp. (2005).
- Minelli A. – Evo-Devo. 109 pp. Roma: Nuova Argos (2004).
- Minelli A. – The Development of Animal Form. Cambridge-New York, Cambridge University Press (2003).

== Awards ==
- Golden Medal 2002 for the Physical and Natural Sciences awarded by the Italian Accademia Nazionale delle Scienze detta dei XL
- Ferrari-Soave Prize 2005 (Animal Biology) awarded by the Accademia delle Scienze, Turin, Italy
- Sherborn Award 2008 for outstanding service to biodiversity informatics
