= La Plata Museum =

Natural history museum in La Plata, Argentina

- Museo de La Plata

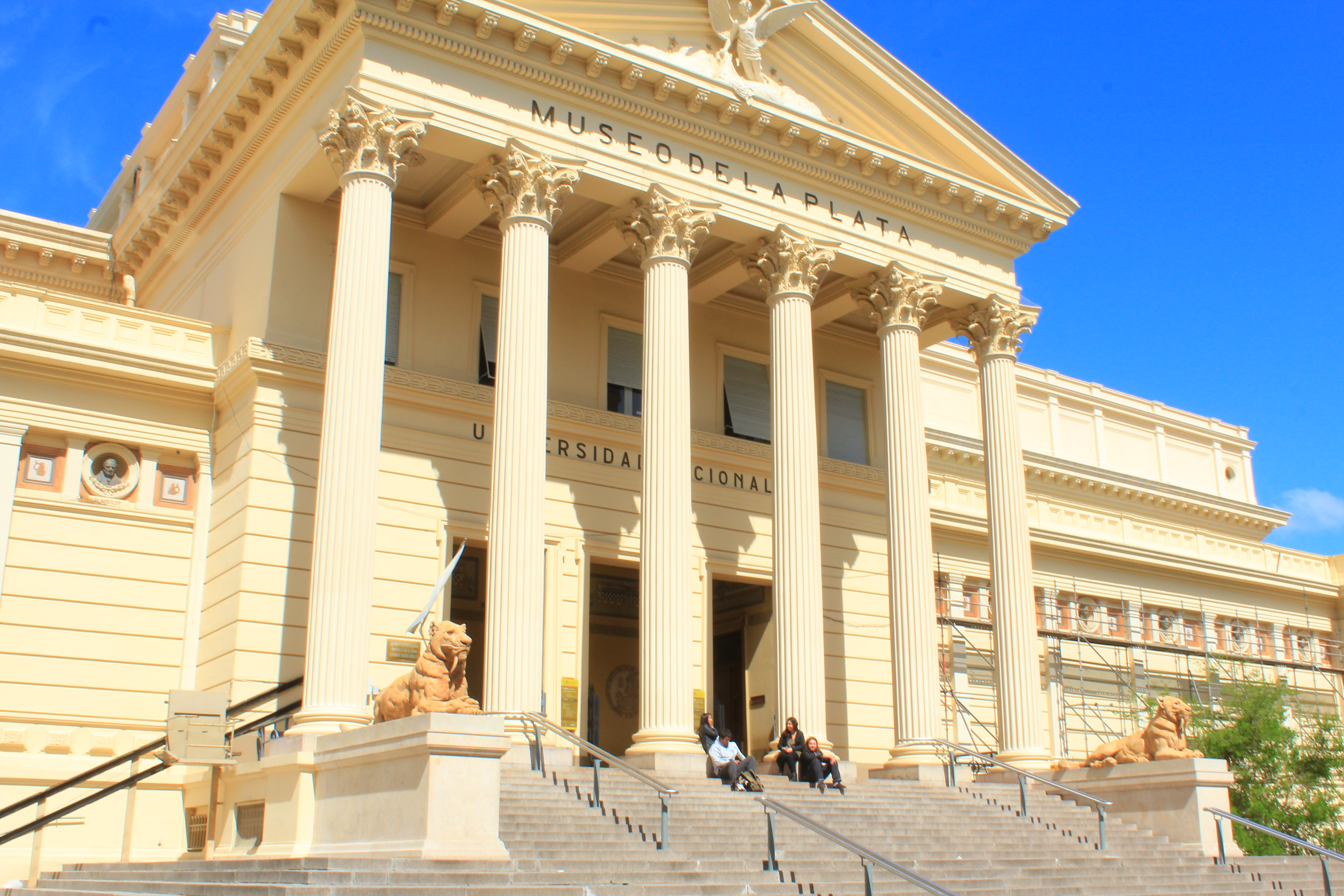
- The neoclassical facade of the museum
- Established: 1884; 142 years ago
- Location: La Plata, Argentina
- Coordinates: 34°54′32″S 57°56′07″W
- Type: Natural history
- Visitors: 400,000
- Director: Analía Lanteri
- Owner: National University of La Plata
- Website: museo.fcnym.unlp.edu.ar

The La Plata Museum (Spanish: Museo de La Plata) is a natural history museum in La Plata, Argentina. It is part of the Facultad de Ciencias Naturales y Museo (Natural Sciences School) of the National University of La Plata.

The building, 135 meters (443 feet) long, today houses three million fossils and relics (including 44,000 botanical items), an amphitheatre opened in 1992, and a 58,000-volume library, serving over 400 university researchers. Around 400,000 visitors (8% of whom are from outside Argentina) pass through its doors yearly, including a thousand visiting researchers.

== History ==
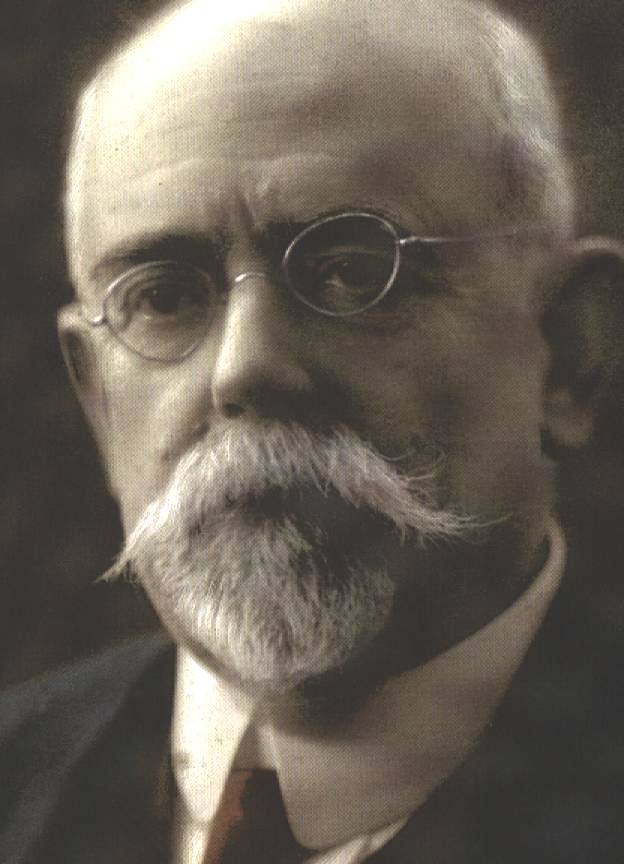
Explorer and anthropologist Francisco P. Moreno

Childhood excursions with his father and older brother led the 14-year-old Francisco Moreno to mount a display of his growing collection of anthropological, fossil and bone findings at his family's Buenos Aires home in 1866, unwittingly laying the foundations for the future La Plata Museum.

Moreno spent the time between 1873 and 1877 exploring then-remote and largely unmapped Patagonia, becoming the first non-indigenous Argentine to reach Lake Nahuel Huapi, what was later named Lago Argentino ("Argentine Lake"), and its imposing glacier (named Perito Moreno Glacier in his honor). The large body of man-made and paleontological samples he gathered and carefully classified during this survey (which also led to the first border demarcation treaty with neighboring Chile, in 1881) led to his establishment of the Buenos Aires Archaeological and Anthropological Museum in 1877.

Internationally respected naturalists such as Paul Broca and Rudolf Virchow contributed valuable donations to the institution, which was incorporated into the Bernardino Rivadavia Natural Sciences Museum. The 1882 establishment of the city of La Plata as the new capital of the Province of Buenos Aires led the provincial legislature to requisition the collection in 1884 for the construction of a new facility set in a north side park designed by renowned urbanist Charles Thays.

The museum in 1910

The La Plata Museum was inaugurated on November 19, 1888 (the sixth anniversary of the city's founding). As his collections were the core of the museum, Moreno was appointed its first director. As director, Moreno sacked Florentino Ameghino in 1888, even denying him entry to the museum. In the process of being sacked Ameghino kept part of a fossil collection (gathered by his brother Carlos Ameghino in Santa Cruz Province on behalf of the museum) to complete its description. Florentino Ameghino's friend Santiago Roth was another early contributor to the museum's paleontological collection. Moreno named Roth as head of the Paleontology Department of the museum in 1895.

Moreno initially struggled to maintain the institution and its collections, a result of sparing legislative appropriations which budgeted for only nine assistants. These limitations helped persuade Moreno to incorporate the museum into the new and growing University of La Plata (today Argentina's second-largest) in 1906. This led to his retirement as director, though by no means of his role as its preeminent caretaker, which occupied him until his death in 1919.

From the beginning the museum's collections drew the attention of the world's anthropological community, attracting numerous visiting international scholars. It earned the American Alliance of Museums' accreditation, as well as plaudits from one of the United States' most prestigious naturalists at the time, Henry Augustus Ward, who deemed the museum to be the fourth most important of its kind in the world.

== Collection and exhibits ==
The Museo de La Plata has around 3 million items in its collection, though only a small part of these are on display. The museum's reputation comes in large part from its collection of large mammal fossils from the third and fourth periods of the Cenozoic Era, found in the Pampas region of northern Argentina.

Argentine trilobites from the Cambrian period and graptolites from the Silurian are on display, and the museum also has zoological, entomological and botanic exhibits.

Archaeological and ethnographic exhibits from Argentina and Peru are displayed on the second floor. The archaeological collection shows the cultural development of the Americas from the Aceramic period (12,800 A.C.) to the time of the Incan Empire and the arrival of the Europeans.

The museum may have modernized its exhibits and added technological mediums, but it still maintains an osteological exhibit with the same characteristics, criteria and concepts that it had near the beginning of the twentieth century. Along with this, the pathway through the museum maintains the original concept of a tour through a timeline of evolutionary history. This is in accordance with the dominant ideas of the scientific community near the end of the nineteenth century.

=== Egyptian Exhibit ===
Although the museum houses primarily South American themed exhibits, there is also an Egyptian exhibit that shows the reconstruction of the Aksha Temple. Because of the planned construction of a levee in the Nile river that would flood the zone, UNESCO, and the Sudanese, Egyptian and Argentine governments funded a reservation and investigation rescue mission. This resulted in three excavation campaigns carried out by Argentine archaeologists between 1961 and 1963. They excavated the temple of Ramesses II from the thirteenth century and in return for their work, the La Plata Museum received 300 items, 60 of which pertained to the temple of Ramesses II. The remaining items were found in an Egyptian tomb or other prehistoric sites and cemeteries. Dardo Rocha also donated three mummies dating from around 2,700 years ago that were conserved in their sarcophagi.

== Gallery ==
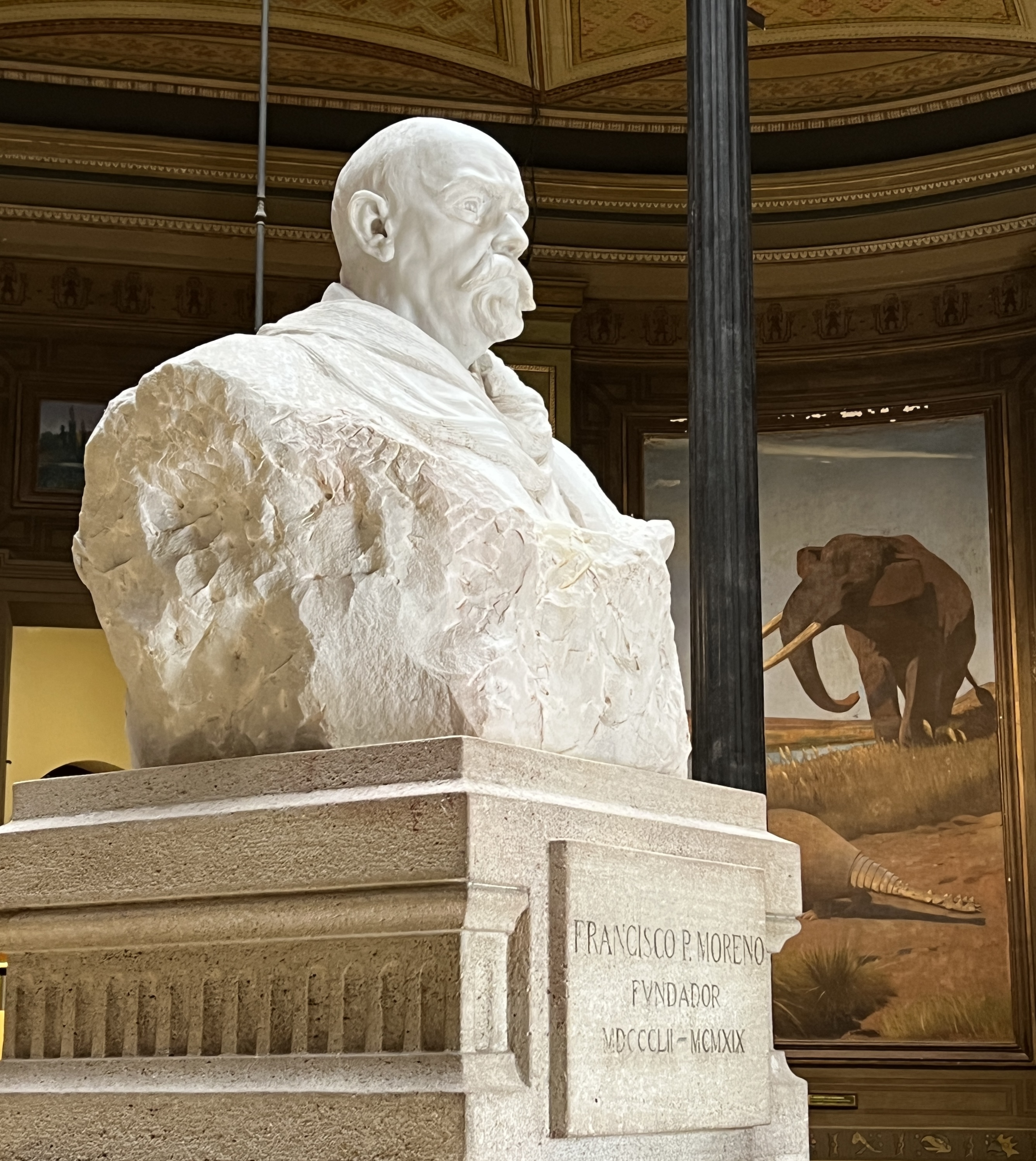
Bust of Francisco Moreno in atrium

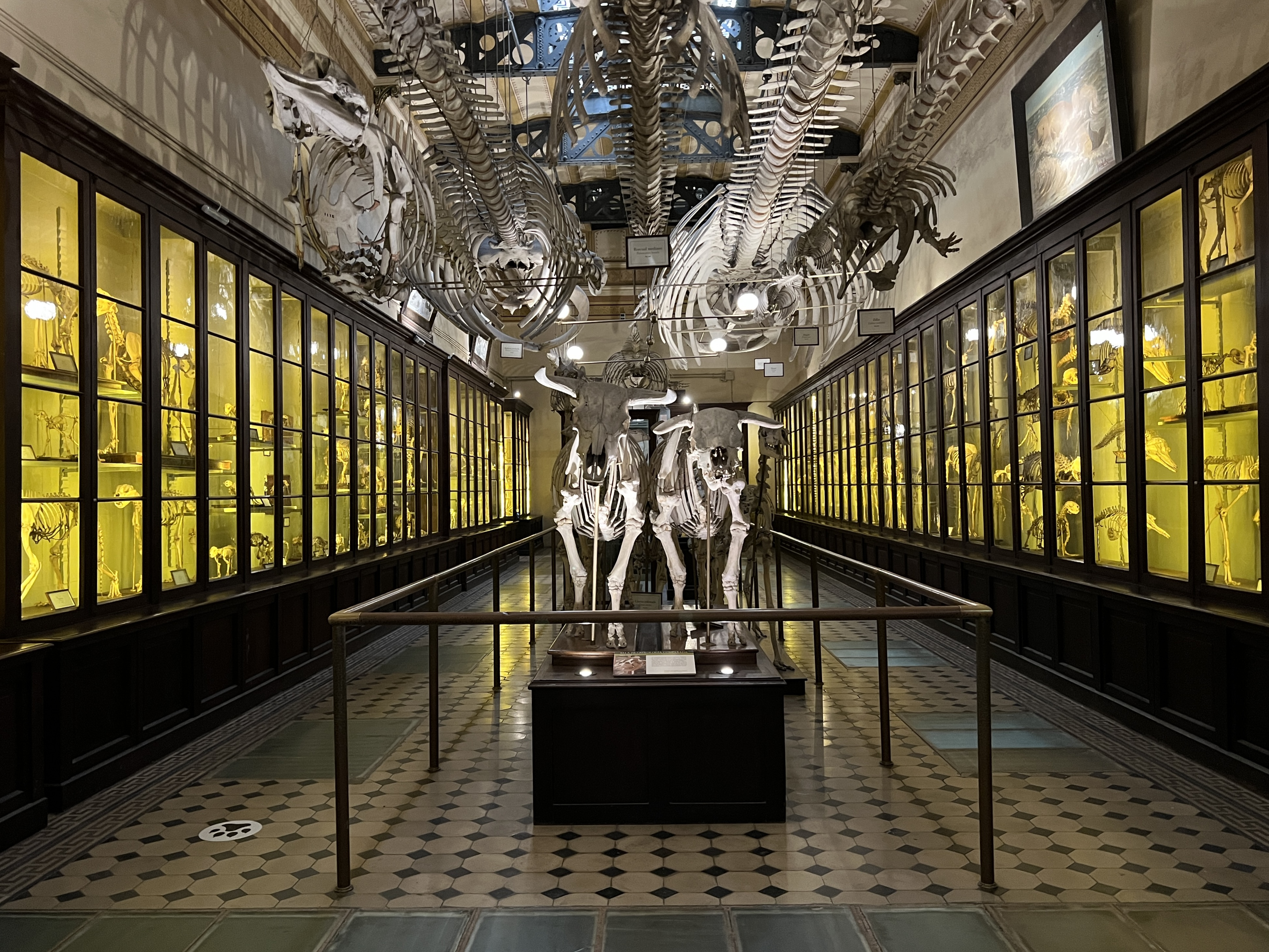
Hall of Comparative Osteology

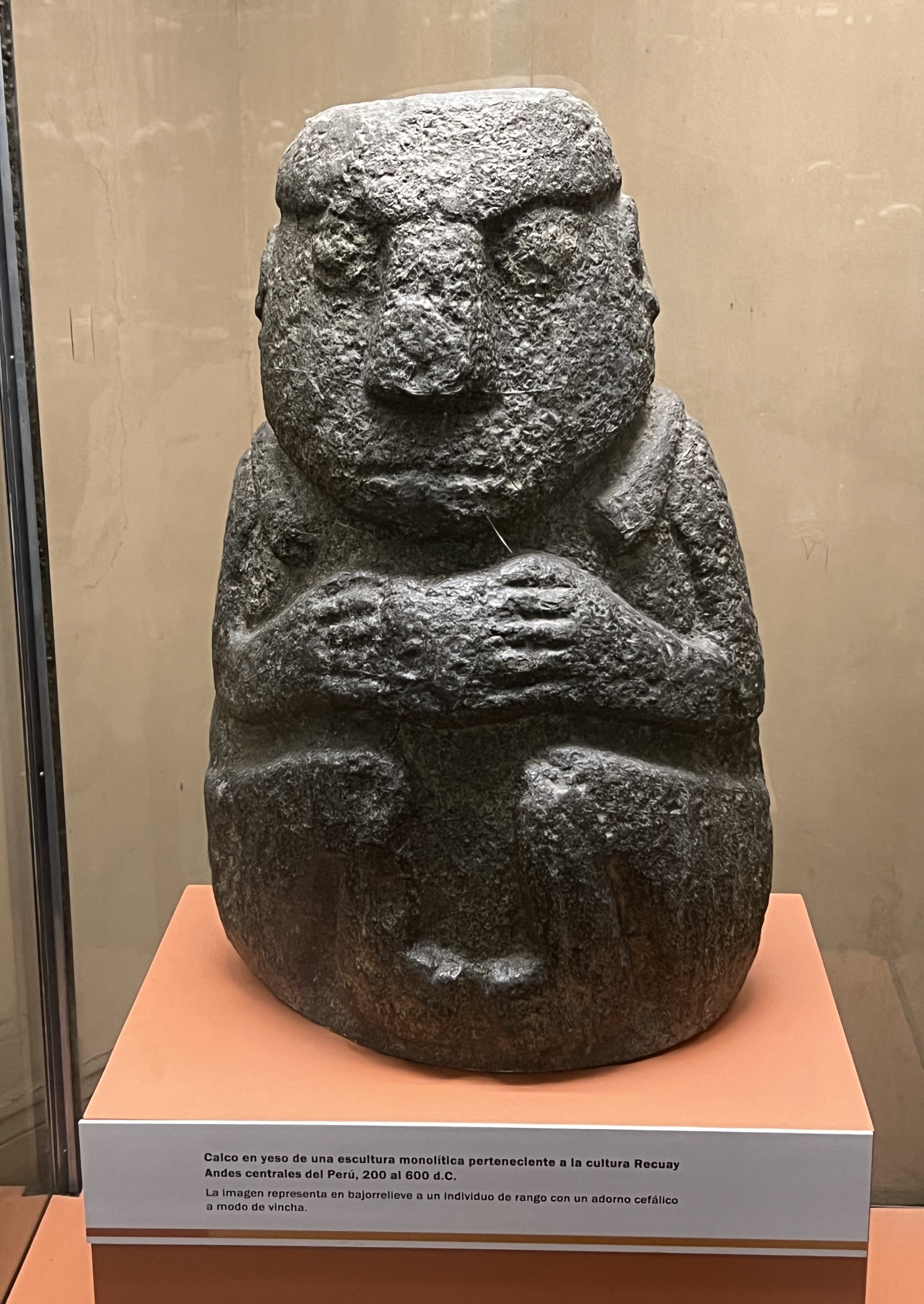
Recuay sculpture

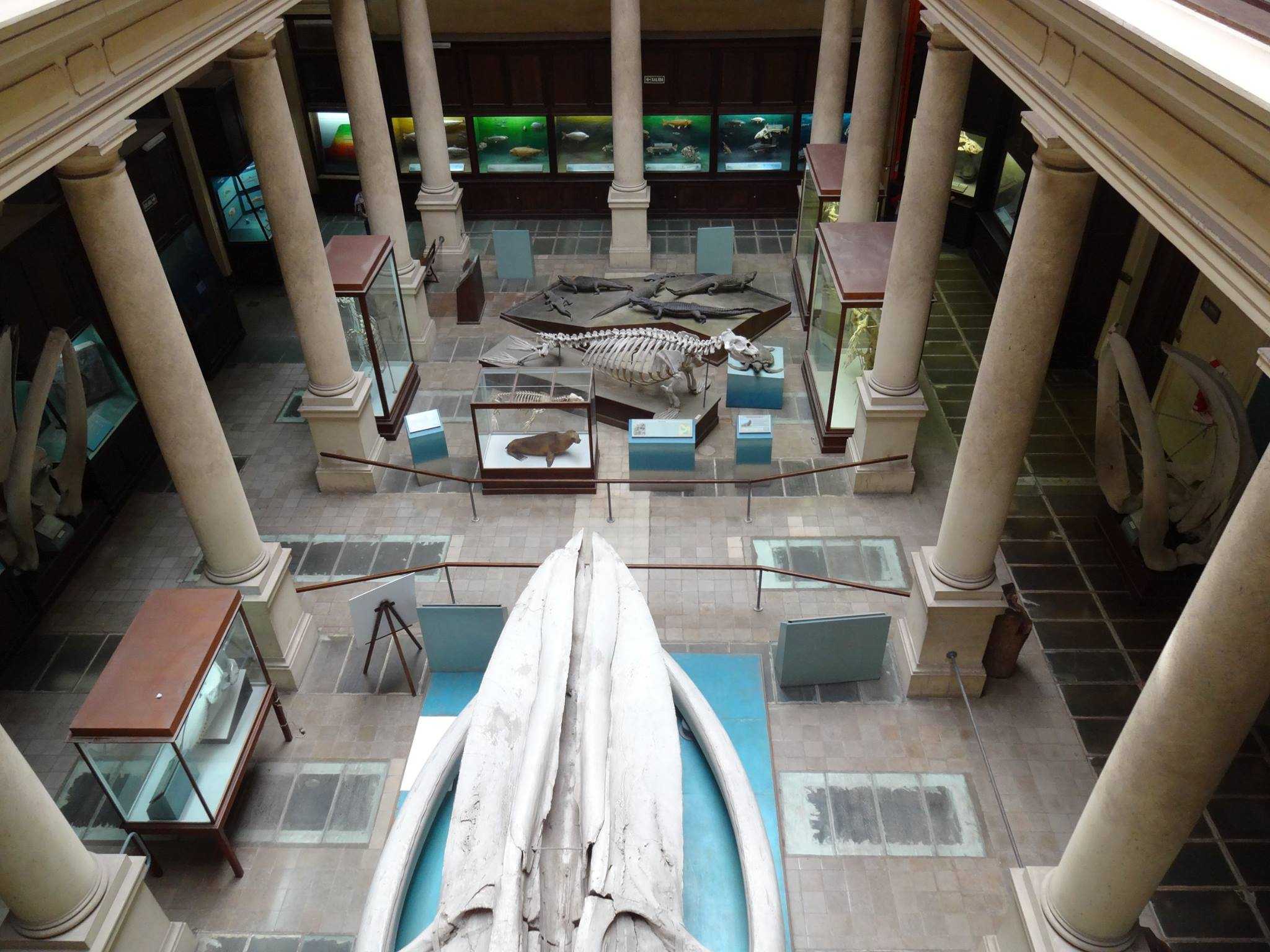
Ocean life exhibit

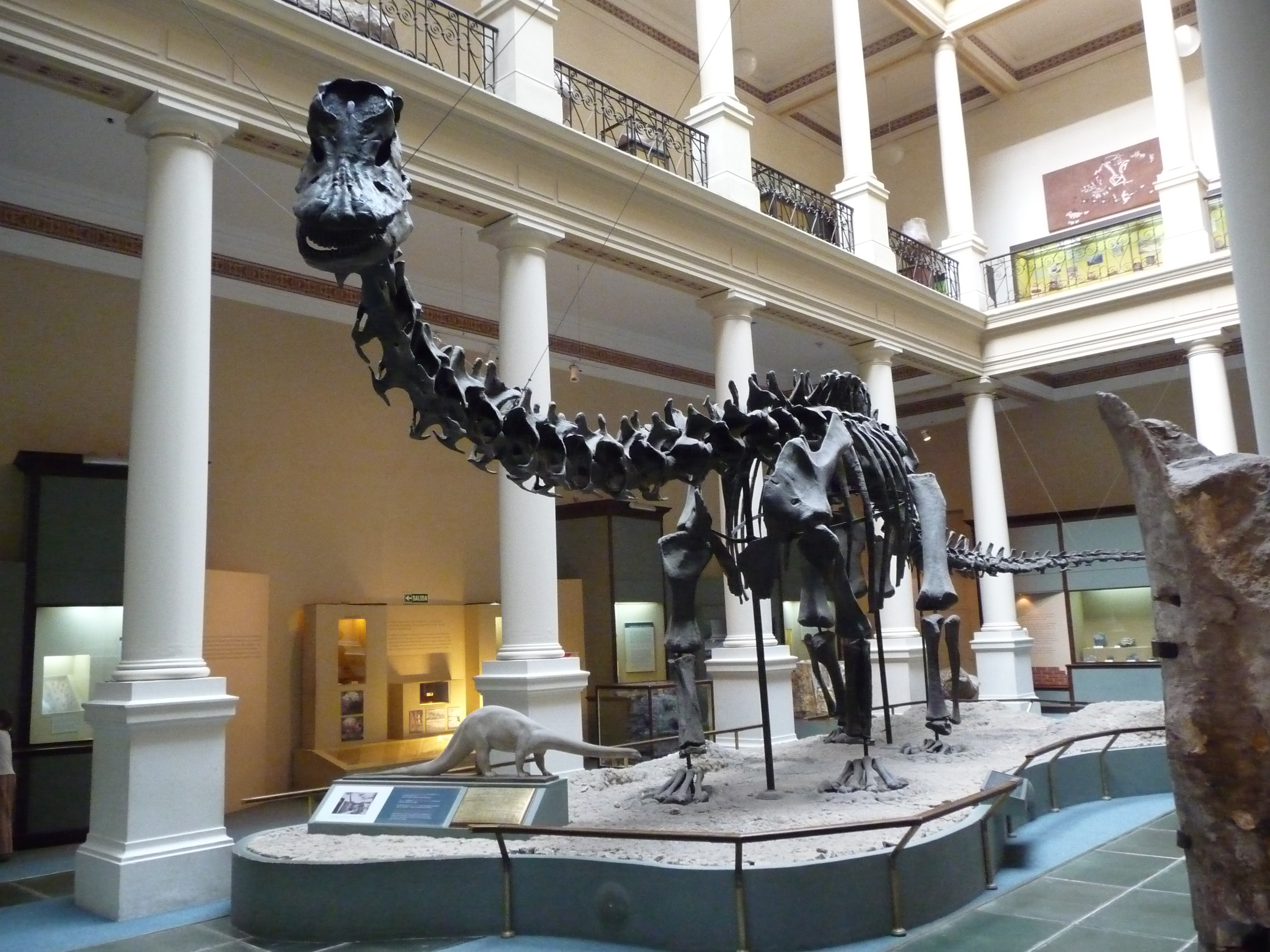
Cast of Diplodocus skeleton

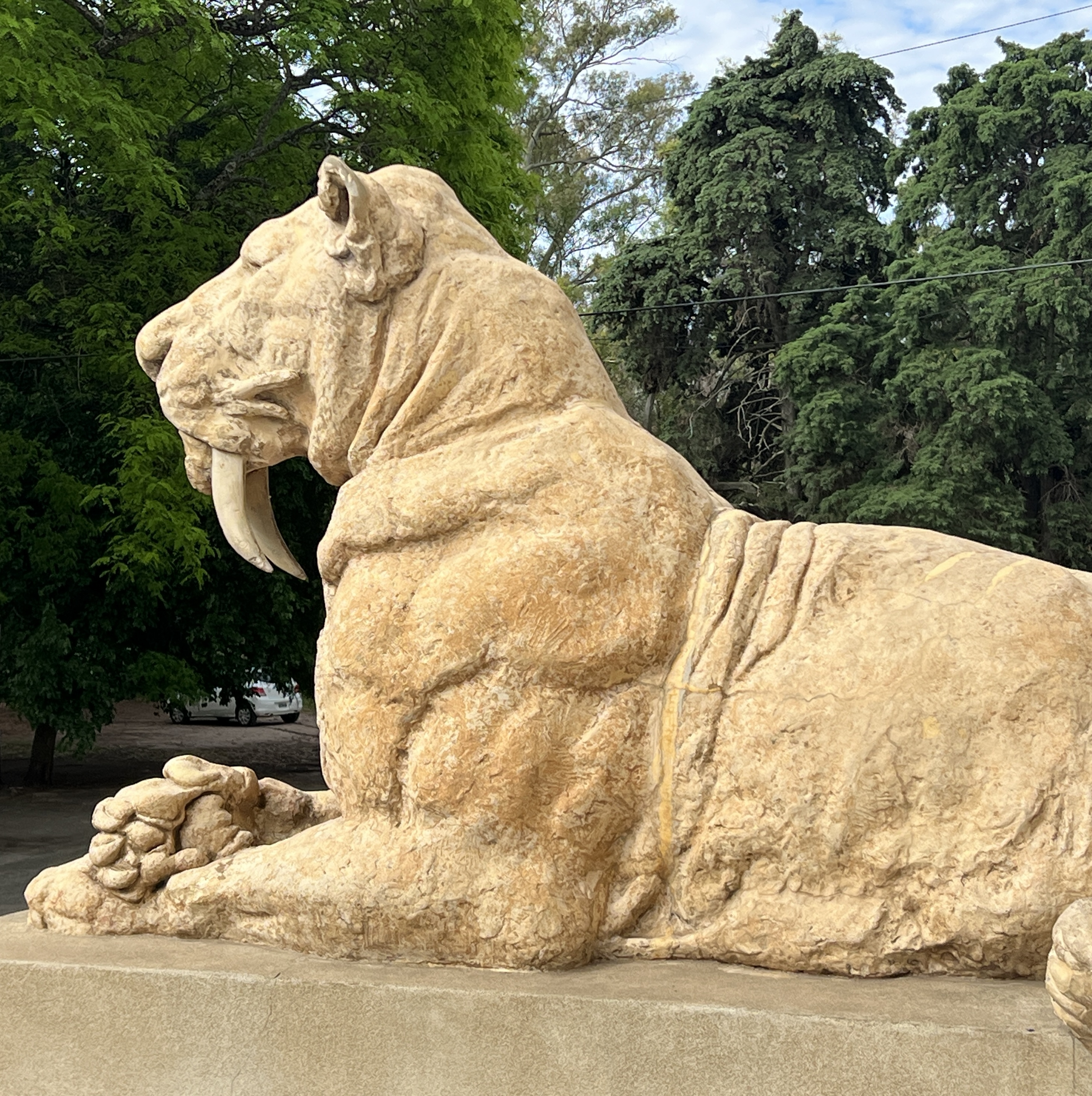
Smilodon sculptures by Victor de Pol guard the entrance

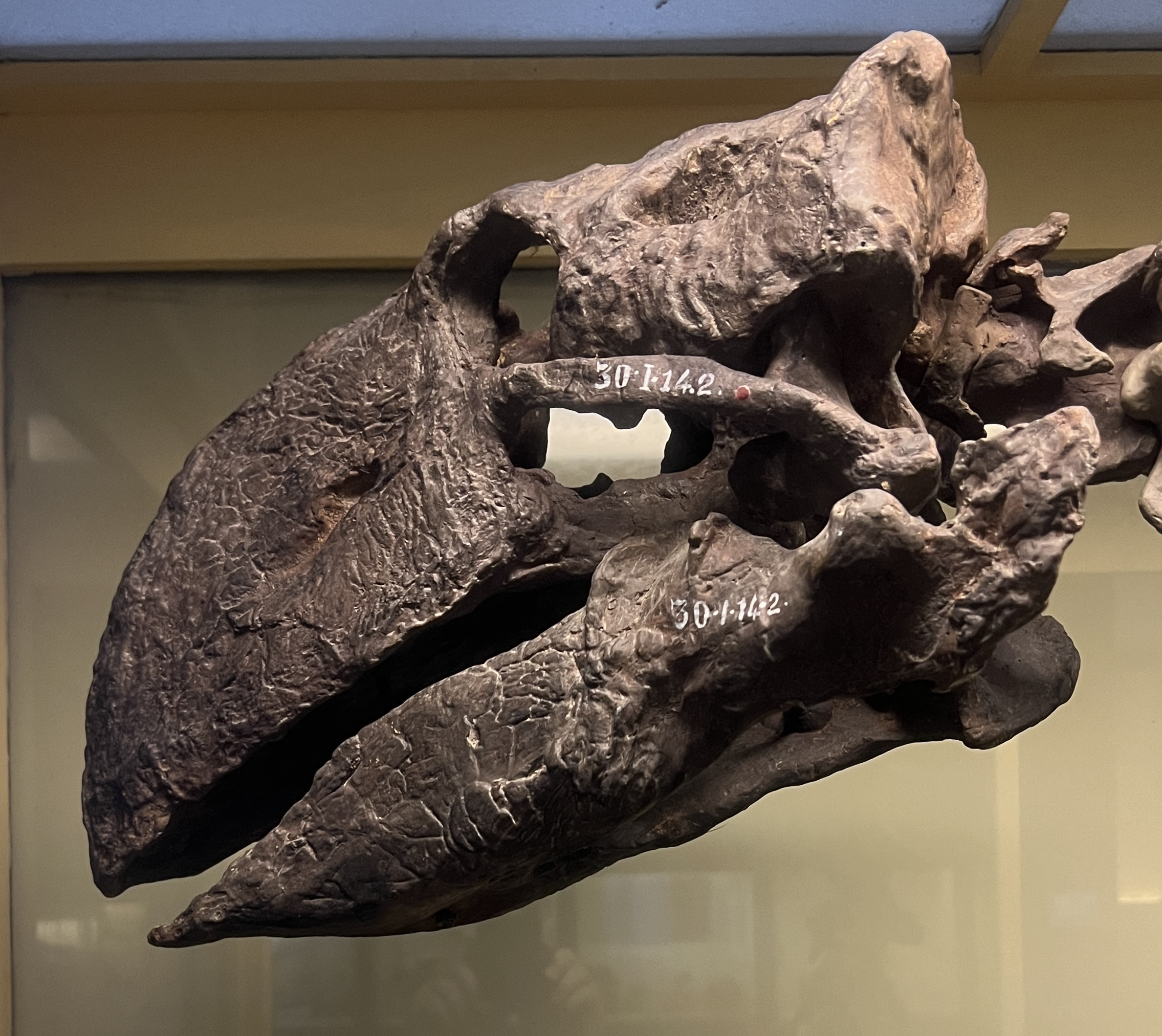
Skull of Gastornis giganteus

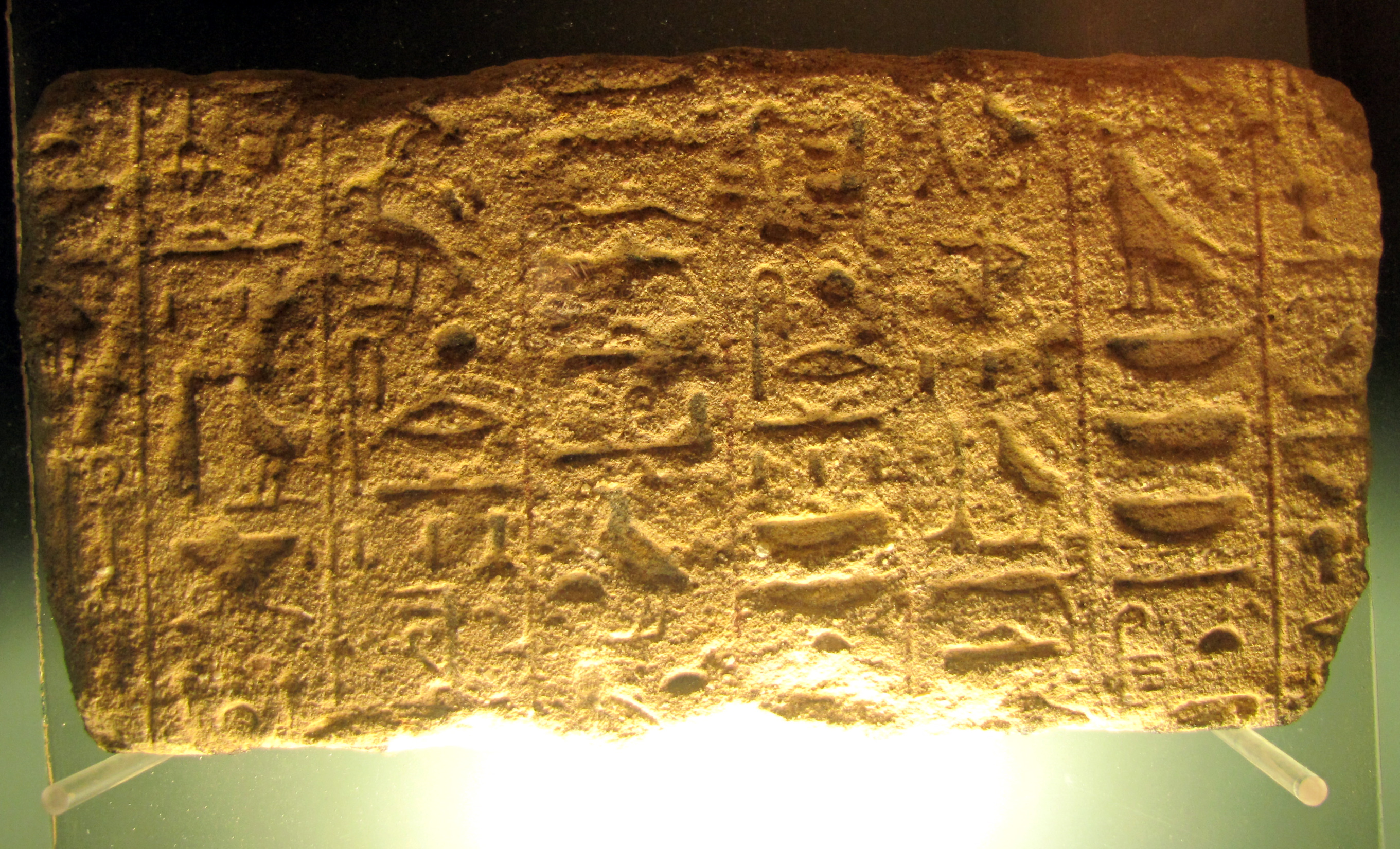
Fragment of the Temple of Aksha
