= Richard L. Hoffman =

American entomologist

- Born: September 25, 1927; Clifton Forge, Virginia
- Died: June 10, 2012 (aged 84); Roanoke, Virginia
- Education: Virginia Tech (PhD); Cornell University (M.S.)
- Known for: Millipede taxonomy and natural history of Virginia
- Scientific career
- Fields: Diplopodology, entomology, herpetology
- Workplaces: Radford University, Virginia Museum of Natural History
- Doctoral advisor: Perry C. Holt

Richard Lawrence Hoffman (September 25, 1927 – June 10, 2012) was an American zoologist known as an international expert on millipedes, and a leading authority on the natural history of Virginia and the Appalachian Mountains. He was a biology professor at Virginia's Radford College for almost thirty years, and curator of invertebrates at the Virginia Museum of Natural History for another twenty years. He co-founded the Virginia Natural History Society, described over 400 species of millipedes, and produced more than 480 scientific publications. He is commemorated in the scientific and/or common names of over 30 animal species, including the valley and ridge salamander (Plethodon hoffmani) and Hoffman's dwarf centipede (Nannarrup hoffmani).

== Biography ==
Richard Hoffman was born in Clifton Forge, Virginia, on September 25, 1927. His father was a railroad machinist whose parents had emigrated from Germany in the late 1800s, and his mother was from a Virginia farming family. Hoffman's scientific publications began at the age of 16, and by the age of 24 he had 29 publications. He attended the University of Virginia until 1950, where he was influenced by Horton H. Hobbs, Jr. a crustacean biologist and recently hired professor. Unable to complete a freshman math class, Hoffman did not complete a degree at Virginia. Rather, in 1951 he was accepted into graduate school at Cornell University, who accepted his publication record as equivalent to passing a math class. When not working in the field or at Cornell, Hoffman worked as a chemist at the Radford Arsenal. He completed his a M.S. in entomology in 1959, and went on to earn a PhD in Zoology from Virginia Tech in 1960, during which he revised the genus Cambarincola, a group of leech-like oligochaete worms that are commensal on crayfish. His doctoral advisor at Virginia Tech was Dr. Perry C. Holt.

After completing his PhD, Hoffman worked as professor of biology at Radford College (now known as Radford University) from 1960 to 1988. Over this 28-year period, Hoffman taught a number of courses including introductory biology and zoology, invertebrate zoology, entomology, herpetology, mammalogy, biogeography, and the history of science. From 1964 to 1970 Hoffman edited The Radford Review, the college's scholarly journal. Hoffman made dramatic improvements to the collections of the Radford Natural History Museum. From 1989 to 2009, Hoffman worked as Curator of Recent Invertebrates at the Virginia Museum of Natural History.

Hoffman died on June 10, 2012, at Carilion Roanoke Memorial Hospital in Roanoke, Virginia, following heart surgery. He was 84. His contributions to science and education were formally recognized by the Virginia General Assembly in 2013.

== Research ==
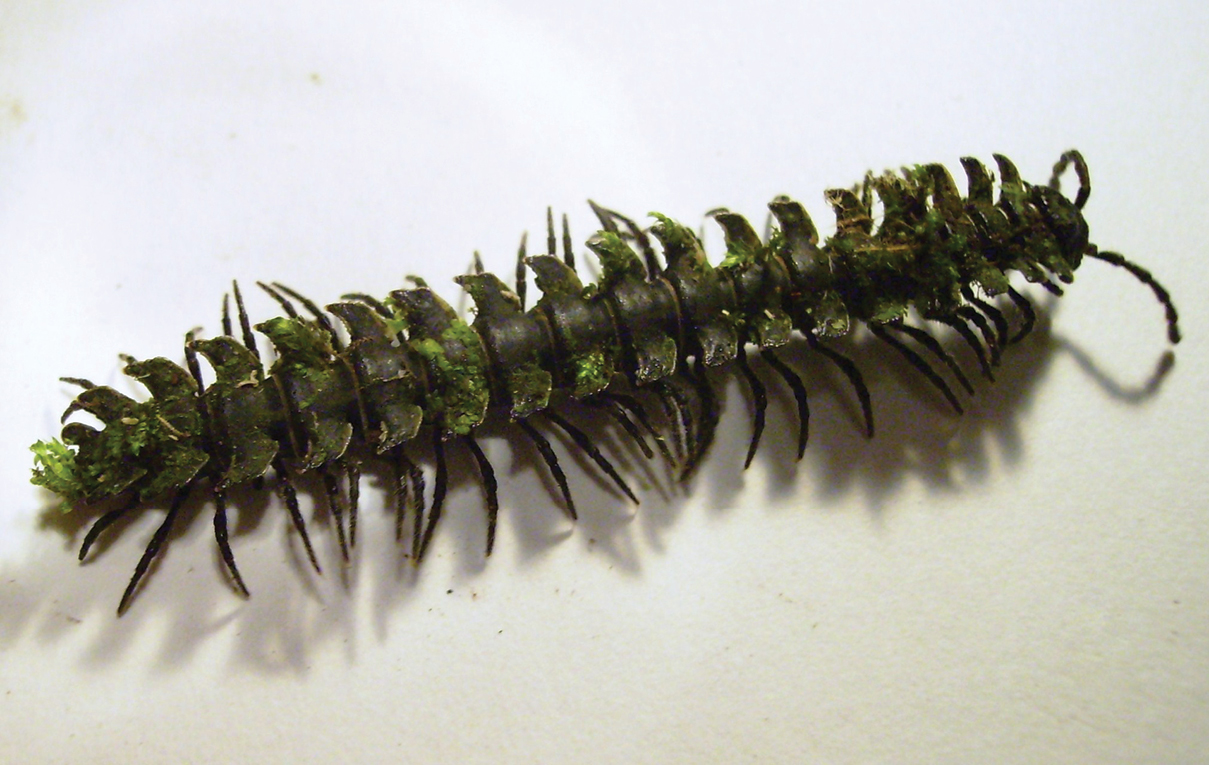
In 2011 Hoffman and colleagues described Psammodesmus bryophorus, a millipede that uses moss for camouflage.

Hoffman was recognized as the world's leading authority of millipedes of his time. He authored or co-authored at least 380 scientific papers on millipedes, and described over 400 species and subspecies, as well as over 200 genera. In 1958, Hoffman co-authored with Ralph V. Chamberlin a checklist of millipedes of North America, the first such work since 1893, which represented an approximate 600% increase in species recorded. Four decades later, Hoffman's 1999 "Checklist of the millipeds of North and Middle America" built upon on his previous work with Chamberlin, as well as checklists of the Caribbean and Central America by Chamberlin and Loomis respectively, to include over 2,100 species. Hoffman founded and edited the journal Myriapodologica from 1978 to 2007. He is commemorated in the names of two families, six genera, 19 species, and two subspecies of millipedes, as well as two species of centipede. He coined new names for anatomical structures, including the terms "ozadene and "ozopore" for the defensive glands and accompanying openings of millipedes, and the term "ocellarium" for the patches of ocelli on each side of the head, also known as ocular fields or "eyes". He also published on fossil millipedes, describing extinct groups and producing a "classic summary" of the millipede fossil record for the Treatise on Invertebrate Paleontology. In 2007, a festschrift consisting of papers from 41 authors on four continents was assembled in honor of Hoffman's 80th birthday.

External videos
- Virginia Museum of Natural History video featuring Dr. Hoffman, on YouTube

Hoffman also wrote over 70 papers on the natural history and conservation of reptiles and amphibians. The valley and ridge salamander (Plethodon hoffmani) is named in his honor. Hoffman also studied insects, mollusks, crustaceans, arachnids, and other invertebrates, and co-founded The Insects of Virginia, a series of occasional publications which ran from 1969 to 2006. Nine insects, three crustaceans, a nematode, an annelid, and a genus of mites have been named after him.

== Influences ==
Roble and Mitchell write that Hoffman's meeting with Hobbs as an undergraduate was the "most significant event in shaping Richard's future career", from whom he learned how to be a good scientist, and whom Hoffman later considered his only true mentor. Hoffman also expressed admiration for the late Dutch biologist C. A. W. Jeekel, whose early correspondence and subsequent friendship affected Hoffman's approach to taxonomy. Hoffman wrote that Jeekel's 1971 Nomenclator Generum et Familiarum Diplopodorum "set the standard for milliped systematics in the era that is now ending" and that Jeekel was somewhat a role model, and "the only person who I conceded to be my master in our field of interest". Despite working with Chamberlin early in his career, Hoffman later described the period as "under the malign influence of R.V. Chamberlin, an exemplar of minimal taxonomy", while Hoffman favored rich descriptions synthesizing previous relevant literature rather than scant, isolated descriptions.

== Major works ==
- Chamberlin, R. V.; —— (1958). "Checklist of the millipeds of North America". Bulletin of the United States National Museum (212): 1–236. doi:10.5479/si.03629236.212. hdl:2027/osu.32435029595998.
- —— (1963). "A revision of the North American annelid worms of the genus Cambarincola (Oligochaeta: Branchiobdellidae)". Proceedings of the United States National Museum. 114 (3470): 271–371. doi:10.5479/si.00963801.114-3470.271.
- —— (1969). "Myriapoda, exclusive of Insecta". In Moore, R. C. (ed.). Treatise on Invertebrate Paleontology, Pt. R, Arthropoda. Vol. 2. Geological Society of America, Inc., and The University of Kansas. pp. R572–606.
- Holt, P. C.; ——; C. W. Hart, Jr., eds. (1969). The Distributional History of the Biota of the Southern Appalachians. Part I: Invertebrates. Research Division Monograph 1. Blacksburg, VA: Virginia Polytechnic Institute.
- —— (1980). Classification of the Diplopoda. Geneva: Muséum d'Historie Naturelle.
- —— (1982). "Diplopoda". In Parker, S. P. (ed.). Synopsis and Classification of Living Organisms. Vol. 2. New York: McGraw Hill. pp. 689–724. ISBN 978-0-07-079031-5.
- —— (1990). "Myriapoda 4. Polydesmida: Oxydesmidae". Das Tierreich. 107.
- —— (1999). Checklist of the Millipeds of North and Middle America. Special Publications. Vol. 8. Virginia Museum of Natural History.
- —— (2005). Monograph of the Gomphodesmidae, a Family of African Polydesmoid Millipeds. Vienna: Naturhistorisches Museum.

== Eponymous taxa ==
The following is a selection of taxa named after Hoffman.

- Hoffmaneumatidae Golovatch, 1978 (a family of millipedes in the order Chordeumatida)
  - Hoffmaneuma Golovatch, 1978 (a millipede genus in the family Hoffmaneumatidae)
- Hoffmanobolidae Shelley, 2001 (a monotypic family of millipedes the order Spirobolida)
- Hoffmanides Kraus, 1966 (a millipede genus in the family Odontopygidae)
- Hoffmanina Jeekel, 1968 (a millipede genus in the family Paradoxosomatidae)
- Hoffmanodesmus Schubart, 1962 (a millipede genus in the family Chelodesmidae)
- Andrognathus hoffmani Shear & Marek 2009 (a millipede in the family Andrognathidae)
- Nannarrup hoffmani Foddai, Bonato, Pereira & Minelli, 2003 (a soil centipede discovered in New York City's Central Park)
- Plethodon hoffmani Highton, 1972 (a salamander in the family Plethodontidae)
- Eucarlia hoffmani Golovatch & Korsós, 1992
- Chaleponcus vilici Enghoff, 2014

== See also ==
- Ecology of the Appalachian Mountains
- Peaks of Otter salamander, which Hoffman had a role in discovering
- Environment of Virginia
