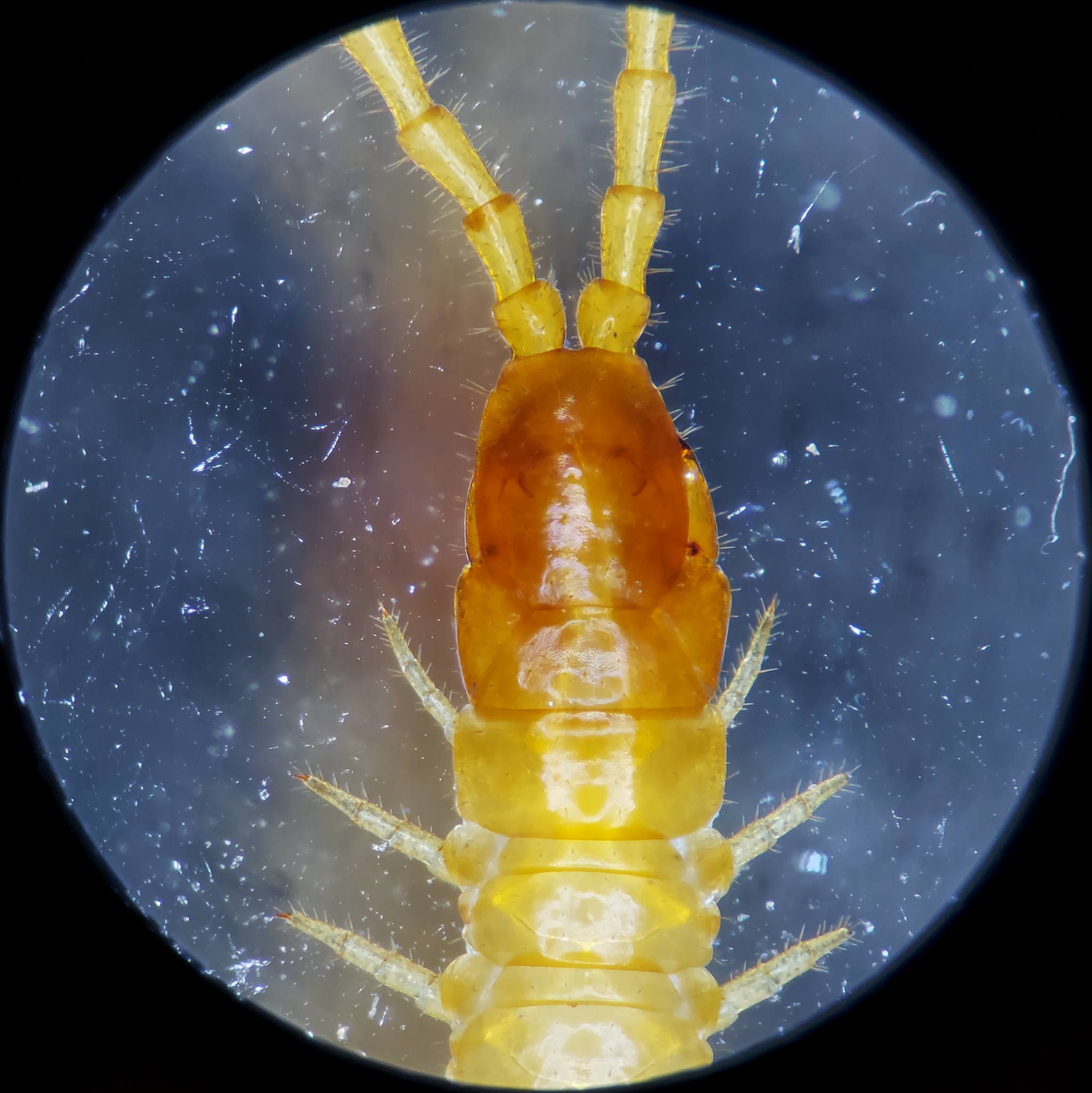
- Escaryus liber

Scientific classification
- Kingdom: Animalia
- Phylum: Arthropoda
- Subphylum: Myriapoda
- Class: Chilopoda
- Order: Geophilomorpha
- Superfamily: Himantarioidea
- Family: Schendylidae; Cook, 1896

= Schendylidae =

Family of centipedes

Schendylidae is a family of soil centipedes in the superfamily Himantarioidea and the order Geophilomorpha. These centipedes are found in the Americas, the Palearctic region, Africa, Madagascar, Australia, and southeast Asia, and also on some Pacific islands. This family was first proposed by the American biologist Orator F. Cook in 1896.

== Taxonomy ==
In 2014, a phylogenetic analysis based on morphological and molecular data found this family to be paraphyletic with respect to the family Ballophilidae. Authorities now deem Ballophilidae to be a synonym of Schendylidae. The family Schendylidae now includes at least 47 genera and 310 described species.

== Description ==
Centipedes in this family feature second maxillae with claws that are often fringed by small spines or rows of filaments. Sternal pores are usually present, most often in a single field. Each coxopleuron most often has only one or two pores.

Compared to most other families in the suborder Adesmata, this family features a modest number of leg-bearing segments and limited variation in this number within each species (usually no more than three or four contiguous odd numbers). This family includes the two species that feature the fewest legs (27 pairs) in the order Geophilomorpha: males in the species Schendylops ramirezi have only 27 pairs of legs, while females have 29, and males in the species S. oligopus have 27 or 29 (usually 29), while females have 31. Furthermore, S. ramirezi is one of only two species in this order in which females have only 29 leg pairs (the other species, Dinogeophilus oligopodus, is also in this family, with 29 in each sex). Several other species in this family are known from specimens with notably few leg pairs in each sex, including Schendlya antici (29 in males and 31 in females), Mesoschendyla javanica (31 in males and 31 or 33 in females), and Escaryus cryptorobius (as few as 31 in males and 33 in females). Among all the other families in the order Geophilomorpha, only the family Geophilidae (including Aphilodontidae, Dignathodontidae, Linotaeniidae, and Macronicophilidae) includes centipedes with so few legs.

Many species in the family Schendylidae are notable for their small sizes. The most extreme examples are the two species in the South American genus Dinogeophilus, which range from 4.5 to 5.5 mm in length. These species are the smallest not only in the order Geophilomorpha but also among all epimorphic centipedes.

== Genera ==
- Algunguis
- Apunguis
- Australoschendyla Jones, 1896
- Bimindyla
- Ctenophilus
- Cymochilus
- Dinogeophilus Silvestri, 1909
- Escaryus Cook & Collins, 1891
- Espagnella
- Falcaryus
- Gosendyla
- Haploschendyla
- Holitys
- Hydroschendyla
- Leptoschendyla Attems, 1953
- Marsikomerus Attems, 1938
- Mesoschendyla Attems, 1909
- Mexiconyx
- Momophilus
- Morunguis
- Nannophilus
- Nannopodellus
- Nesonyx Chamberlin, 1923
- Nyctunguis Chamberlin, 1914
- Orygmadyla
- Parunguis
- Pectiniunguis Bollman, 1889
- Plesioschendyla Ribaut, 1923
- Schendyla Bergsøe & Meinert, 1866
- Schendylellus
- Schendylops Cook, 1899
- Serrunguis
- Sogodes
- Sogolabis
- Thindyla
