= Strongylosoma alampes =

Scientific classification
- Kingdom: Animalia
- Phylum: Arthropoda
- Subphylum: Myriapoda
- Class: Diplopoda
- Order: Polydesmida
- Family: Paradoxosomatidae
- Genus: Strongylosoma
- Species: S. alampes

Binomial name
- Strongylosoma alampes Attems, 1898

Species of millipede

Strongylosoma alampes is a species of millipedes in the family Paradoxosomatidae.

It was first described by Austrian myriapodologist and invertebrate zoologist, Carl August Graf Attems-Petzenstein in 1898.

S. alampes is indigenous to Java, Indonesia.
