= Strongylosoma asiaeminoris =

Scientific classification
- Kingdom: Animalia
- Phylum: Arthropoda
- Subphylum: Myriapoda
- Class: Diplopoda
- Order: Polydesmida
- Family: Paradoxosomatidae
- Genus: Strongylosoma
- Species: S. asiaeminoris

Binomial name
- Strongylosoma asiaeminoris Verhoeff, 1898

Species of millipede

Strongylosoma asiaeminoris is a species of millipede from the family Paradoxosomatidae. It was first described in 1989 by Karl Wilhelm Verhoeff. It is endemic to Turkey.
