= Strongylosoma lenkoranum =

Scientific classification
- Kingdom: Animalia
- Phylum: Arthropoda
- Subphylum: Myriapoda
- Class: Diplopoda
- Order: Polydesmida
- Family: Paradoxosomatidae
- Genus: Strongylosoma
- Species: S. lenkoranum

Binomial name
- Strongylosoma lenkoranum Attems, 1898

Synonyms
- Strongylosoma stragulatum Lohmander, 1932; Strongylosoma strangulatum Lohmander, 1932; Strongylosoma leukoramum Attems, 1898

Species of millipede

Strongylosoma lenkoranum is a species of diplopod that was first described by Carl Graf Attems in 1898.
