= Strongylosoma samium =

Scientific classification
- Kingdom: Animalia
- Phylum: Arthropoda
- Subphylum: Myriapoda
- Class: Diplopoda
- Order: Polydesmida
- Family: Paradoxosomatidae
- Genus: Strongylosoma
- Species: S. samium

Binomial name
- Strongylosoma samium Verhoeff, 1901

Synonyms
- Strongylosoma pallipes var. magnesiaca Attems, 1903; Strongylosoma pallipes var. tenuis Attems, 1903; Strongylosoma pallipes werneri Attems, 1903; Strongylosoma werneri (Attems, 1903)

Species of millipede

Strongylosoma samium is a species of diplopod that was first described by Karl Wilhelm Verhoeff in 1901. There are three subspecies accepted in this species:

- Strongylosoma samium cisaegaeum Verhoeff, 1941
- Strongylosoma samium samium Verhoeff, 1901
- Strongylosoma samium werneri Attems, 1903
