= Iulidesmus semirugosus =

Scientific classification
- Kingdom: Animalia
- Phylum: Arthropoda
- Subphylum: Myriapoda
- Class: Diplopoda
- Order: Polydesmida
- Family: Paradoxosomatidae
- Genus: Iulidesmus
- Species: I. semirugosus

Binomial name
- Iulidesmus semirugosus (Pocock, 1888)

Synonyms
- Mestosoma semirugosum (Pocock, 1888); Strongylosoma semirugosum Pocock, 1888; Strongylosoma semirugosus Pocock, 1888

Species of millipede

Iulidesmus semirugosus is a species of diplopod first described by Reginald Innes Pocock in 1888 in the genus Strongylosoma, and later moved to Iulidesmus.
