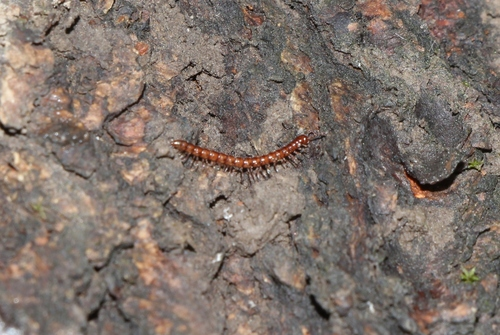
- Strongylosoma jaqueti specimen

Scientific classification
- Kingdom: Animalia
- Phylum: Arthropoda
- Subphylum: Myriapoda
- Class: Diplopoda
- Order: Polydesmida
- Family: Paradoxosomatidae
- Genus: Strongylosoma
- Species: S. jaqueti

Binomial name
- Strongylosoma jaqueti Verhoeff, 1898

= Strongylosoma jaqueti =

Species of millipede

Strongylosoma jaqueti is a species of diplopod that was first described by Karl Wilhelm Verhoeff in 1898.
