= Mesoschendyla javanica =

Scientific classification
- Kingdom: Animalia
- Phylum: Arthropoda
- Subphylum: Myriapoda
- Class: Chilopoda
- Order: Geophilomorpha
- Family: Schendylidae
- Genus: Mesoschendyla
- Species: M. javanica

Binomial name
- Mesoschendyla javanica Attems, 1907

Species of centipede

Mesoschendyla javanica is a species of soil centipede in the family Schendylidae. This centipede is found on the Greater Sunda Islands of Java and Borneo and is the only species in the genus Mesoschendyla found in Asia. This species is notable for its small size and modest number of legs. This centipede reaches only 10 mm in length, including the antennae, which is the minimum size recorded in the genus Mesoschendyla. Furthermore, this species usually features only 31 pairs of legs, the minimum number found in any species of Mesoschendyla.

== Discovery, distribution, and ecology ==
This species was first described in 1907 by the Austrian myriapodolodist Carl Attems. He based the original description of this species on a few male specimens found in bat guano in the district of Ciampea in the province of West Java in Indonesia. Type material in the form of two slides prepared from parts of two syntypes is deposited in the Natural History Museum in Vienna. Attems originally described this species under the name Schendyla javanica, but in 1929, he placed this species in the genus Mesoschendyla instead.

Since the original description of this species, no more specimens were recorded until the collection of 49 specimens in soil samples from Gunung Mulu National Park in the state of Sarawak in East Malaysia during the 1977–1978 Royal Geographical Society expedition to the island of Borneo. These specimens include seven adult females and are deposited in the Natural History Museum in London. The description of these specimens in 2025 included the first description of the female of this species. Most of these specimens were found in soil 10 cm to 20 cm below the surface and in mixed dipterocarp forests at altitudes below 500 m.

== Description ==
The body of this centipede is a very pale yellow with a slightly darker head but is white when preserved in ethanol. The body usually ranges from 7 mm to 8.5 mm in length, but this species can reach 10 mm in length including the antennae, which are slightly clavate and range from 0.5 mm to 0.6 mm in length. Most specimens feature 31 pairs of legs, but one female specimen features 33 leg pairs. Although lappets project from the lateral margins of the first maxillae in most Mesoschendyla species, these lappets are absent in M. javanica.

Fields of pores appear on the sternites from the second through the twelfth leg-bearing segments. These fields each feature four to ten pores. The pores form the outline of a transverse ellipse on the fourth through the tenth leg-bearing segments but form a curved row on the other segments with pore-fields.

The main sternite of the last leg-bearing segment is wider than long, with a width/length ratio of 1.6 to 1.7 in males and 2.0 in females. The basal element of each of the ultimate legs features a single pore that is usually entirely hidden by the adjacent sternite. The ultimate legs in this species exhibit a degree of sexual dimorphism that is unusual for a species in the family Schendylidae. Each of the ultimate legs ends in a large claw in the females, but in males, each of these legs feature only a minute hair-like projection at the distal end. These legs are also swollen in the males but not enlarged in the females.

This species shares many distinctive traits with other species of Mesoschendyla. For example, the main sternite of the last leg-bearing segment is wide in this species, and each of the ultimate legs features a single pore. Furthermore, like other species in this genus, M. javanica features pore-fields on only anterior segments of the trunk.

This species can be distinguished from all other Mesoschendyla species, however, based on its modest number of legs and limited number of segments with pore-fields. All other species in this genus feature at least 45 leg pairs and pore-fields that extend through leg-bearing segment 20. For example, M. franzi is the only other Mesoschydyla species to exhibit the small size observed in M. javanica, measuring only 10 mm in length, but M. franzi features 53 leg pairs and pore-fields on leg-bearing segments 2 through 21. Similarly, M. picturata is the only Mesoschendyla species other than M. javanica without lappets on the first maxillae, but M. picturata reaches 40 mm in length and features 63 leg pairs and pore-fields on leg-bearing segments 2 through 37.
