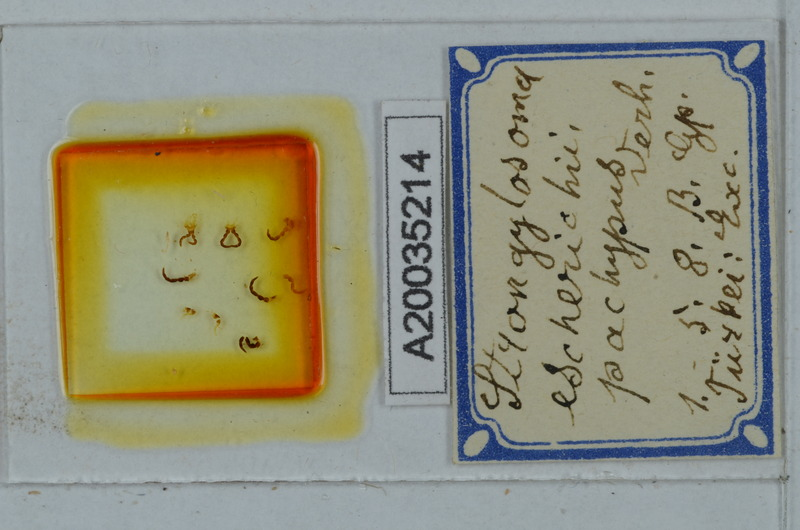
- Strongylosoma escherichii pachypus specimens

Scientific classification
- Kingdom: Animalia
- Phylum: Arthropoda
- Subphylum: Myriapoda
- Class: Diplopoda
- Order: Polydesmida
- Family: Paradoxosomatidae
- Genus: Strongylosoma
- Species: S. escherichii

Binomial name
- Strongylosoma escherichii Verhoeff, 1896

Synonyms
- Strongylosoma escherichi (Verhoeff, 1896); Strongylosoma pallipes escherichi Verhoeff, 1896; Strongylosoma pallipes escherichii (Verhoeff, 1896); Strongylosoma pallipes var. escherichi (Verhoeff, 1896); Triarthrosoma pallipes escherichii (Verhoeff, 1896)

= Strongylosoma escherichii =

Species of myriapod

Strongylosoma escherichii is a species of diplopod described by Karl Wilhelm Verhoeff in 1896. There are two subspecies assigned to this species:

- Strongylosoma escherichii escherichii Verhoeff, 1896
- Strongylosoma escherichii pachypus Verhoeff, 1941
