= Strongylosoma coiffaiti =

Scientific classification
- Kingdom: Animalia
- Phylum: Arthropoda
- Subphylum: Myriapoda
- Class: Diplopoda
- Order: Polydesmida
- Family: Paradoxosomatidae
- Genus: Strongylosoma
- Species: S. coiffaiti

Binomial name
- Strongylosoma coiffaiti Hoffman & Lohmander, 1968

Species of millipede

Strongylosoma coiffaiti is a species of millipede in the family Paradoxosomatidae. It was first described by Richard L. Hoffman and Hans Lohmander in 1968. It is native to Turkey.
