= Strongylosoma skeatii =

Scientific classification
- Kingdom: Animalia
- Phylum: Arthropoda
- Subphylum: Myriapoda
- Class: Diplopoda
- Order: Polydesmida
- Family: Paradoxosomatidae
- Genus: Strongylosoma
- Species: S. skeatii

Binomial name
- Strongylosoma skeatii Sinclair, 1901

Species of myriapod

Strongylosoma skeatii is a species of millipede that was described by Frederick Granville Sinclair in 1901.
