= Strongylosoma forcarti =

Scientific classification
- Kingdom: Animalia
- Phylum: Arthropoda
- Subphylum: Myriapoda
- Class: Diplopoda
- Order: Polydesmida
- Family: Paradoxosomatidae
- Genus: Strongylosoma
- Species: S. forcarti

Binomial name
- Strongylosoma forcarti Lohmander, 1939

Species of millipede

Strongylosoma forcarti is a species of diplopod described by Hans Lohmander in 1939.
