= Strongylosoma erromenon =

Scientific classification (uncertain)
- Kingdom: Animalia
- Phylum: Arthropoda
- Subphylum: Myriapoda
- Class: Diplopoda
- Order: Polydesmida
- Family: Paradoxosomatidae
- Genus: Strongylosoma
- Species: S. erromenon

Binomial name
- Strongylosoma erromenon Attems, 1898

Species of myriapod

Strongylosoma erromenon is a species of diplopod in the family Paradoxosomatidae, described by Carl Graf Attems in 1898. There is some question as to its classification.
