= Strongylosoma nodulosum =

Scientific classification
- Kingdom: Animalia
- Phylum: Arthropoda
- Subphylum: Myriapoda
- Class: Diplopoda
- Order: Polydesmida
- Family: Paradoxosomatidae
- Genus: Strongylosoma
- Species: S. nodulosum

Binomial name
- Strongylosoma nodulosum Attems, 1897

Species of millipede

Strongylosoma nodulosum is a species of diplopod that was first described by Carl Graf Attems in 1897.
