= Strongylosoma uniseriale =

Scientific classification
- Kingdom: Animalia
- Phylum: Arthropoda
- Subphylum: Myriapoda
- Class: Diplopoda
- Order: Polydesmida
- Family: Paradoxosomatidae
- Genus: Strongylosoma
- Species: S. uniseriale

Binomial name
- Strongylosoma uniseriale Attems, 1951

Species of millipede

Strongylosoma uniseriale is a species of diplopod that was described by Carl Graf Attems in 1951.
