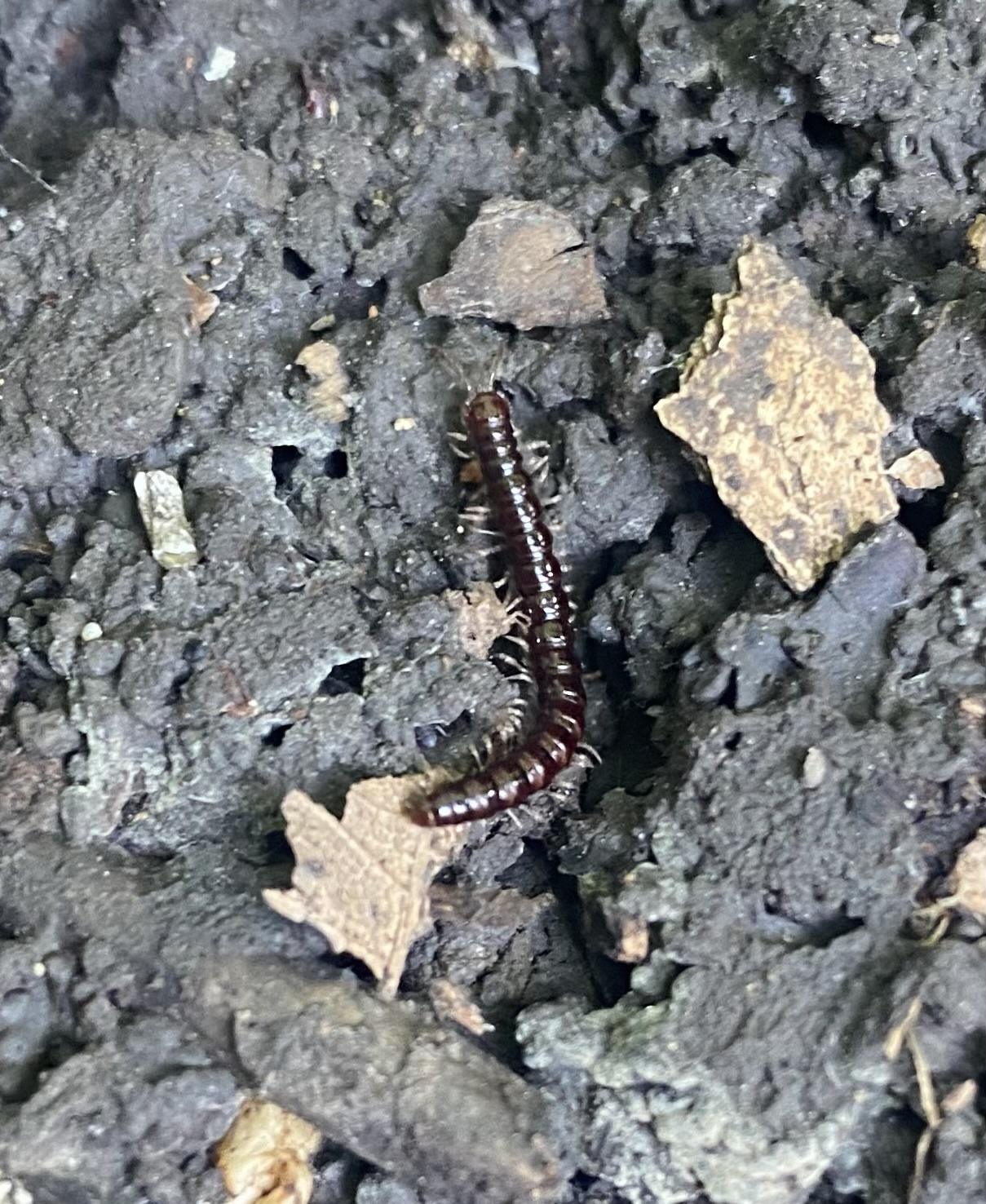

Scientific classification
- Kingdom: Animalia
- Phylum: Arthropoda
- Subphylum: Myriapoda
- Class: Diplopoda
- Order: Polydesmida
- Family: Paradoxosomatidae
- Genus: Strongylosoma
- Species: S. kordylamythrum

Binomial name
- Strongylosoma kordylamythrum Attems, 1898

= Strongylosoma kordylamythrum =

Species of millipede

Strongylosoma kordylamythrum is a species of diplopod that was first described by Carl Graf Attems in 1898.
