= Strongylosoma euxinum =

Scientific classification
- Kingdom: Animalia
- Phylum: Arthropoda
- Subphylum: Myriapoda
- Class: Diplopoda
- Order: Polydesmida
- Family: Paradoxosomatidae
- Genus: Strongylosoma
- Species: S. euxinum

Binomial name
- Strongylosoma euxinum Hoffman & Lohmander, 1968

Species of millipede

Strongylosoma euxinum is a species of diplopod described by Richard L. Hoffman and Hans Lohmander in 1968.
