= Leptoschendyla =

Scientific classification
- Kingdom: Animalia
- Phylum: Arthropoda
- Subphylum: Myriapoda
- Class: Chilopoda
- Order: Geophilomorpha
- Family: Schendylidae
- Genus: Leptoschendyla; Attems, 1953
- Species: L. paucipes

Binomial name
- Leptoschendyla paucipes Attems, 1953

Genus of centipede

Leptoschendyla is a monotypic genus of soil centipede in the family Schendylidae. The only species in this genus is Leptoschendyla paucipes. This centipede is found in Vietnam. This species features 39 pairs of legs in both sexes and can reach 20 mm in length.

== Discovery and distribution ==
This genus and its only species were first described in 1953 by the Austrian myriapodologist Carl Attems, who explicitly designated L. paucipes as the type species for the new genus. He based the original description of this centipede on a sample of specimens including both sexes. These specimens were collected in Lang Biang on the Đà Lạt plateau in the province of Lâm Đồng in Vietnam. Syntypes including one male and one female are deposited in the Natural History Museum in Vienna. This centipede is known only from Vietnam.

== Description ==
This centipede is a pale yellow, features 39 leg pairs in each sex, and can reach 20 mm in length. The head is longer than wide. Each antenna is shaped like a thread and does not become thicker toward the distal end. The mandible features about ten teeth that grow longer toward the distal end and are not divided into blocks. The coxosternite of the second maxillae is undivided. The claw at the distal end of each of the second maxillae is well developed and fringed with two rows of filaments.

The forcipules lack teeth and do not reach the anterior margin of the head when closed. The forcipular coxosternite lacks chitin lines. The trunk sternites do not feature fields of pores. The sternite of the last leg-bearing segment is shaped like a trapezoid with a straight posterior margin that is slightly narrower than the anterior margin. The basal element of each of the ultimate legs (coxopleuron) features two pores. Each of the ultimate legs features seven articles with a claw at the distal end. The telson features anal pores.

This centipede shares many traits with other species in the family Schendylidae. For example, as in other species in this family, the antennae are slender. Furthermore, as in other species in this family, each coxopleuron features no more than two pores.

This genus shares an especially distinctive set of traits with another monotypic genus in the same family, Sogodes, which contains only one species, S. difficilis. For example, each of these two centipedes features two pores on each coxopleuron but lacks pores on the trunk sternites. Furthermore, in both of these centipedes, the forcipules lack teeth and do not reach the anterior margin of the head when closed, and each of the ultimate legs features seven articles and a claw.

These two centipedes can be distinguished, however, based on other traits. For example, the claw on each of the second maxillae features combs of bristles in L. paucipes but is simple and smooth in S. difficilis. Furthermore, the head is longer than wide in L. paucipes but slightly wider than long in S. difficilis, and the forcipular coxosternite features chitin lines in S. difficilis but not in L. paucipes. Moreover, S. difficilis features 63 leg pairs, many more than the 39 pairs observed in L. paucipes.
