= Steneurytion =

Scientific classification
- Kingdom: Animalia
- Phylum: Arthropoda
- Subphylum: Myriapoda
- Class: Chilopoda
- Order: Geophilomorpha
- Family: Geophilidae
- Genus: Steneurytion; Attems, 1909

Synonyms
- Pachymeroides Chamberlin, 1920; Philosogus Chamberlin, 1920; Zelanion Chamberlin, 1920

Genus of centipedes

Steneurytion is a genus of centipedes in the family Geophilidae. This genus was first described by Austrian myriapodologist Carl Attems in 1909. These centipedes are found in Australia, New Zealand, and Hawaii.

== Description ==
Centipedes in this genus feature elongate heads, elongate forcipules, second maxillae with particularly elongate claws and sclerotized rims surrounding the metameric pores, no sternal pores, and an ultimate leg-bearing segment with a narrow metasternite and scattered coxal pores; the lateral parts of the labrum almost touch medially. These centipedes range from about 2 cm to about 4 cm in length and can have 37 to 53 pairs of legs. The species S. dux is notable for its large size (up to 44 mm in length) and for having as many as 53 leg pairs, the maximum number recorded in this genus.

== Species ==
Valid species:

- Steneurytion antipodum (Pocock, 1891)
- Steneurytion dux (Chamberlin, 1920)
- Steneurytion hawaiiensis (Chamberlin, 1953)
- Steneurytion incisunguis (Attems, 1911)
- Steneurytion mjoebergi (Verhoeff, 1925)
- Steneurytion morbosus (Hutton, 1877)
