= Sundanina niasensis =

Scientific classification
- Kingdom: Animalia
- Phylum: Arthropoda
- Subphylum: Myriapoda
- Class: Diplopoda
- Order: Polydesmida
- Family: Paradoxosomatidae
- Genus: Sundanina
- Species: S. niasensis

Binomial name
- Sundanina niasensis Silvestri, 1895

Species of millipede

Sundanina niasensis is a species of diplopod that was first described by Filippo Silvestri in 1895.
