= Maoriella =

Scientific classification
- Kingdom: Animalia
- Phylum: Arthropoda
- Subphylum: Myriapoda
- Class: Chilopoda
- Order: Geophilomorpha
- Family: Geophilidae
- Genus: Maoriella; Attems, 1903

Type species
- Maoriella aucklandica Attems, 1903

Synonyms
- Mesoleptodon Chamberlin, 1920; Novaralius Attems, 1947; Philogeonus Chamberlin, 1920

Genus of centipedes

Maoriella is a genus of centipedes in the family Geophilidae. It was described by Austrian myriapodologist Carl Attems in 1903. Species in this genus are found in New Zealand, Australia, and Tahiti.

== Description ==
The head and forcipules in this genus are very elongate, the coxosternite of the second maxillae is divided mid-longitudinally without sclerotized ridges, and the sternal pores are arranged in two pairs of groups. Centipedes in this genus range from about 3 cm to 9 cm in length and have 41 to 91 pairs of legs. The large species Maoriella aucklandica can reach 90 mm in length and can have as many as 91 leg pairs, the maximum number in this genus. The small species M. zelanica measures 28 mm in length and can have as few as 41 leg pairs, the minimum number in this genus.

== Species ==
There are six valid species:

- Maoriella aucklandica Attems, 1903
- Maoriella australis Archey, 1936
- Maoriella ecdema Crabill, 1964
- Maoriella edentata (Attems, 1947)
- Maoriella macrostigma Attems, 1903
- Maoriella zelanica (Chamberlin, 1920)
