= Strongylosoma innotatum =

Scientific classification
- Kingdom: Animalia
- Phylum: Arthropoda
- Subphylum: Myriapoda
- Class: Diplopoda
- Order: Polydesmida
- Family: Paradoxosomatidae
- Genus: Strongylosoma
- Species: S. innotatum

Binomial name
- Strongylosoma innotatum (Karsch, 1881)

Synonyms
- Polydesmus innotatum Karsch, 1881; Strongylosoma innotatus (Karsch, 1881)

Species of millipede

Strongylosoma innotatum is a species of diplopod that was first described by Ferdinand Karsch in 1881.
