= Strongylosoma dubium =

Scientific classification (uncertain)
- Kingdom: Animalia
- Phylum: Arthropoda
- Subphylum: Myriapoda
- Class: Diplopoda
- Order: Polydesmida
- Family: Paradoxosomatidae
- Genus: Strongylosoma
- Species: S. dubium

Binomial name
- Strongylosoma dubium L. Koch, 1867

Species of myriapod

Strongylosoma dubium is a species of diplopod described by Ludwig Carl Christian Koch in 1867.
