= Strongylosoma =

Scientific classification
- Kingdom: Animalia
- Phylum: Arthropoda
- Subphylum: Myriapoda
- Class: Diplopoda
- Order: Polydesmida
- Family: Paradoxosomatidae
- Genus: Strongylosoma; Brandt, 1833

Genus of millipedes

Strongylosoma is a genus of millipedes belonging to the family Paradoxosomatidae. The species of this genus are found in Eurasia and Australia.

There are 40 accepted species in this genus:

- Strongylosoma asiaeminoris Verhoeff, 1898
- Strongylosoma bisulcatum Fanzago, 1877
- Strongylosoma coiffaiti Hoffman & Lohmander, 1968
- Strongylosoma erucaria Butler, 1876
- Strongylosoma escherichii Verhoeff, 1896
- Strongylosoma euxinum Hoffman & Lohmander, 1968
- Strongylosoma festai Manfredi, 1939
- Strongylosoma forcarti Lohmander, 1939
- Strongylosoma glabrum (Peters, 1864)
- Strongylosoma hetairon Attems, 1897
- Strongylosoma innotatum (Karsch, 1881)
- Strongylosoma japonicum Peters, 1864
- Strongylosoma jaqueti Verhoeff, 1898
- Strongylosoma kordylamythrum Attems, 1898
- Strongylosoma lenkoranum Attems, 1898
- Strongylosoma modiglianii Silvestri, 1895
- Strongylosoma montivagum Carl, 1912
- Strongylosoma nadari (Brölemann, 1896)
- Strongylosoma nietneri Peters, 1864
- Strongylosoma nigrum Chamberlin, 1920
- Strongylosoma nitidum Brölemann, 1902
- Strongylosoma nodulosum Attems, 1897
- Strongylosoma punctatum Attems, 1901
- Strongylosoma pustulatum Brölemann, 1902
- Strongylosoma quaesitum Chamberlin, 1920
- Strongylosoma rhodium (Brandt)
- Strongylosoma robustior Chamberlin, 1920
- Strongylosoma rubrimarginatum Chamberlin, 1920
- Strongylosoma rubripes L. Koch, 1867
- Strongylosoma sagittarium (Karsch, 1881)
- Strongylosoma sagittarius Karsch, 1881
- Strongylosoma samium Verhoeff, 1901
- Strongylosoma sanguineum Silvestri, 1895
- Strongylosoma semoni Attems, 1898
- Strongylosoma skeatii Sinclair, 1901
- Strongylosoma spilonotum Gervais, 1847
- Strongylosoma stigmatosum (Eichwald, 1830)
- Strongylosoma subflavum Pocock, 1894
- Strongylosoma uniseriale Attems, 1951
- Strongylosoma vermiculare Peters, 1864

There are another seven species whose placement is questioned:

- Strongylosoma alampes Attems, 1898 (uncertain, uncertain genus and species)
- Strongylosoma dubium L. Koch, 1867 (uncertain, uncertain genus and species)
- Strongylosoma ensiger (Karsch, 1881) (uncertain, uncertain genus and species)
- Strongylosoma erromenon Attems, 1898 (uncertain, uncertain genus and species)
- Strongylosoma eruca (Wood, 1864) (uncertain, uncertain genus and species)
- Strongylosoma impressum Gervais, 1847 (uncertain)
- Strongylosoma vermiforme Eydoux & Soueyet (uncertain > nomen dubium)
