= Strongylosoma subflavum =

Scientific classification
- Kingdom: Animalia
- Phylum: Arthropoda
- Subphylum: Myriapoda
- Class: Diplopoda
- Order: Polydesmida
- Family: Paradoxosomatidae
- Genus: Strongylosoma
- Species: S. subflavum

Binomial name
- Strongylosoma subflavum Pocock, 1894

Species of millipede

Strongylosoma subflavum is a species of diplopod that was described by Reginald Innes Pocock in 1894.
