= Antichiropus =

Scientific classification
- Kingdom: Animalia
- Phylum: Arthropoda
- Subphylum: Myriapoda
- Class: Diplopoda
- Order: Polydesmida
- Family: Paradoxosomatidae
- Subfamily: Australiosomatinae
- Tribe: Antichiropodini
- Genus: Antichiropus; Attems, 1911

Genus of millipedes

Antichiropus is a genus of millipede in the family Paradoxosomatidae. The genus is very distinctive in the form of the gonopod, which is typically coiled through at least a full circle. It is probably endemic to Australia. Some species have small ranges of less than 10000 km^{2}, classifying them as short-range endemic invertebrates.

== See also ==
- Antichiropus fossulifrons (Attems, 1911) – Western Australia
- Antichiropus humphreysi (Shear, 1992) – Western Australia
- Antichiropus mammilifer (Jeekel, 1982) – South Australia
- Antichiropus minimus (Attems, 1911) – Western Australia
- Antichiropus monacanthus (Attems, 1911) – Western Australia
- Antichiropus nanus (Attems, 1911) – Western Australia
- Antichiropus sulcatus (Attems, 1911) – Western Australia
- Antichiropus variabilis (Attems, 1911) – Western Australia
- Antichiropus whistleri (Attems, 1911) – Western Australia
