= Sundanina =

Scientific classification
- Kingdom: Animalia
- Phylum: Arthropoda
- Subphylum: Myriapoda
- Class: Diplopoda
- Order: Polydesmida
- Family: Paradoxosomatidae
- Subfamily: Paradoxosomatinae
- Tribe: Sundaninini
- Genus: Sundanina; Attems, 1914

Type species
- Strongylosoma gastrotrichum Attems, 1898

Genus of millipedes

Sundanina is a genus of millipedes belonging to the family Paradoxosomatidae.

There are 19 species assigned to this genus:

- Sundanina albicans (Carl, 1902)
- Sundanina aphanes (Attems, 1898)
- Sundanina bataviae (Humbert & De Saussure, 1869)
- Sundanina carnea (Pocock, 1894)
- Sundanina cochinchina Nguyen, 2010
- Sundanina gastrotricha (Attems, 1898)
- Sundanina gastrotrichum Attems, 1898
- Sundanina infausta (Silvestri, 1895)
- Sundanina modiglianii (Silvestri, 1895)
- Sundanina niasensis (Silvestri, 1895)
- Sundanina nigricornis Attems, 1898
- Sundanina septentrionalis Turk, 1947
- Sundanina simalurensis Jeekel, 1957
- Sundanina simillima (Silvestri, 1895)
- Sundanina solitaria (Carl, 1909)
- Sundanina trifasciata (Silvestri, 1895)
- Sundanina trifida Carl, 1941
- Sundanina trilobita Wang & Tang, 1965
- Sundanina xanthonota Attems, 1930
