= Strongylosoma sagittarium =

Scientific classification
- Kingdom: Animalia
- Phylum: Arthropoda
- Subphylum: Myriapoda
- Class: Diplopoda
- Order: Polydesmida
- Family: Paradoxosomatidae
- Genus: Strongylosoma
- Species: S. sagittarium

Binomial name
- Strongylosoma sagittarium Karsch, 1881

Species of millipede

Strongylosoma sagittarium is a species of diplopod that was first described by Ferdinand Karsch in 1881.
