= Sundanina simillima =

Scientific classification
- Kingdom: Animalia
- Phylum: Arthropoda
- Subphylum: Myriapoda
- Class: Diplopoda
- Order: Polydesmida
- Family: Paradoxosomatidae
- Genus: Sundanina
- Species: S. simillima

Binomial name
- Sundanina simillima (Silvestri, 1895)

Synonyms
- Strongylosoma simillima Silvestri, 1895; Strongylosoma simillimum Silvestri, 1895

Species of millipede

Sundanina simillima is a species of diplopod that was first described by Filippo Silvestri in 1895.
