= Strongylosoma glabrum =

Scientific classification
- Kingdom: Animalia
- Phylum: Arthropoda
- Subphylum: Myriapoda
- Class: Diplopoda
- Order: Polydesmida
- Family: Paradoxosomatidae
- Genus: Strongylosoma
- Species: S. glabrum

Binomial name
- Strongylosoma glabrum (Peters, 1864)

Synonyms
- Eustrongylosoma glabrum (Peters, 1864); Polydesmus glabrum Peters, 1864

Species of millipede

Strongylosoma glabrum is a species of diplopod first described by Wilhelm Peters in 1864.
