= Castle of Mey =

16th-century castle in Scotland

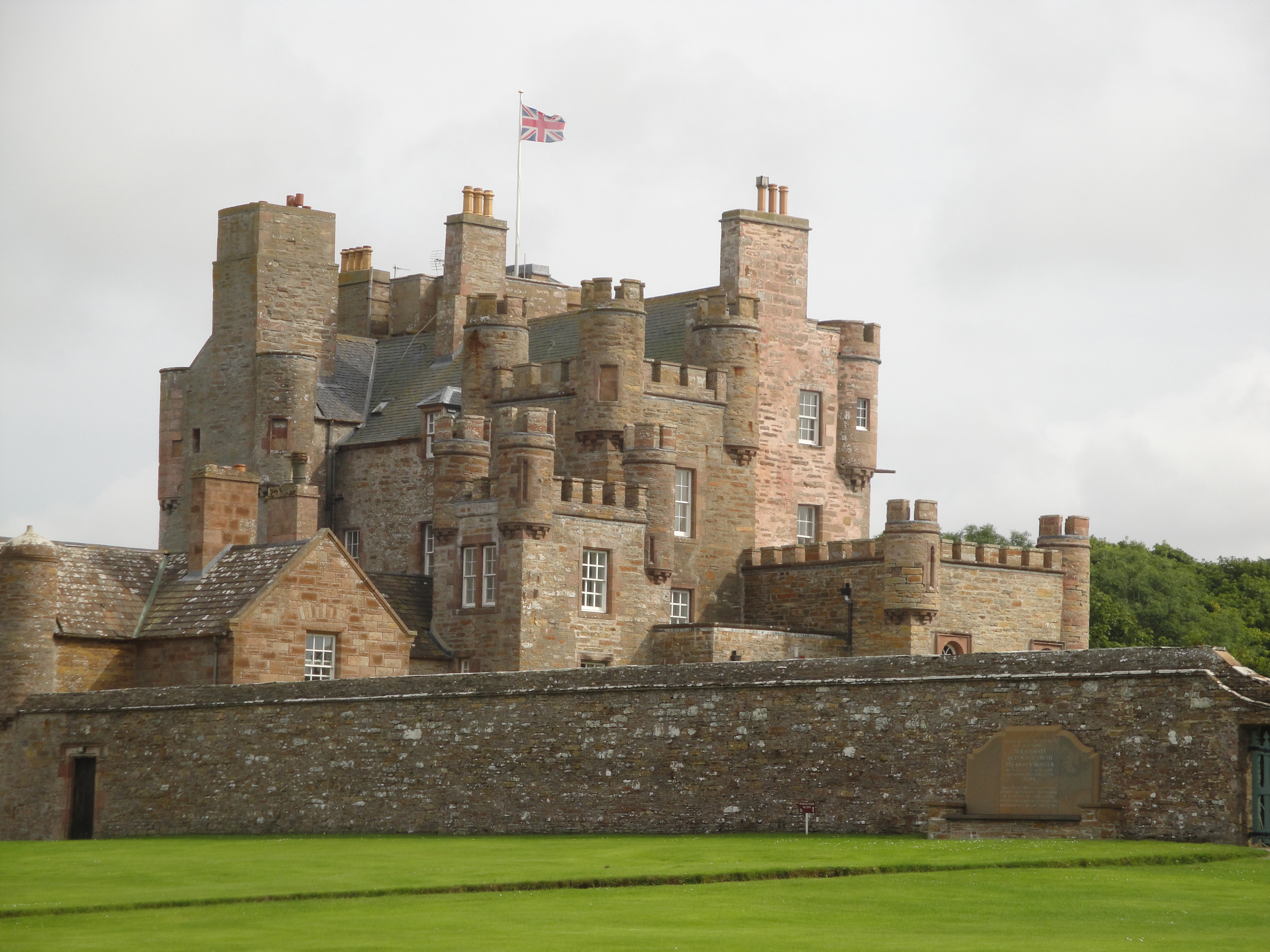
- Castle of Mey (2014)

- Location within Caithness
- Former names: Barrogill Castle

General information
- Location: Scotland
- Coordinates: 58°38′49″N 3°13′29″W
- Construction started: 1566
- Completed: 1572
- Renovated: 1950s

Inventory of Gardens and Designed Landscapes in Scotland
- Official name: Castle of Mey (Barrogill Castle)
- Designated: 30 June 1987
- Reference no.: GDL00096
- Owner: Castle of Mey Trust

The Castle of Mey (also known for a time as Barrogill Castle) is located in Caithness, on the north coast of Scotland, about 6 miles (10 km) west of John o' Groats. In fine weather there are views from the castle north to Orkney.

== History ==
The lands of Mey belonged to the Bishops of Caithness. The Castle of Mey was built between 1566 and 1572, possibly on the site of an earlier fortification, by the 4th Earl of Caithness. According to a February 2019 report:

"The castle was probably built between 1566 and 1572 by George Sinclair, 4th Earl of Caithness [and] includes a dominating tower with a series of tall ranges to the side and rear creating a three-sided courtyard open to the north and the sea."

Originally a Z-plan tower house of three storeys, it had a projecting wing at the south-east, and a square tower at the north-west. The castle passed to Lord Caithness's younger son William, founder of the Sinclairs of Mey, although it later became the seat of the earls. The castle's name was changed to Barrogill, and the structure was extended several times, in the 17th and 18th centuries, and again in 1821 when Tudor Gothic style alterations were made, to designs by William Burn. Barrogill passed out of the Sinclair family in 1889, on the death of the 15th Earl of Caithness, when it passed to F. G. Heathcote (later Sinclair). In 1929 it was bought by Captain Frederic Bouhier Imbert-Terry.

The castle was used as an officers' rest home during the Second World War, and in 1950 the estate farms were sold off. By that time, only the tower was habitable.

=== Royal residence ===
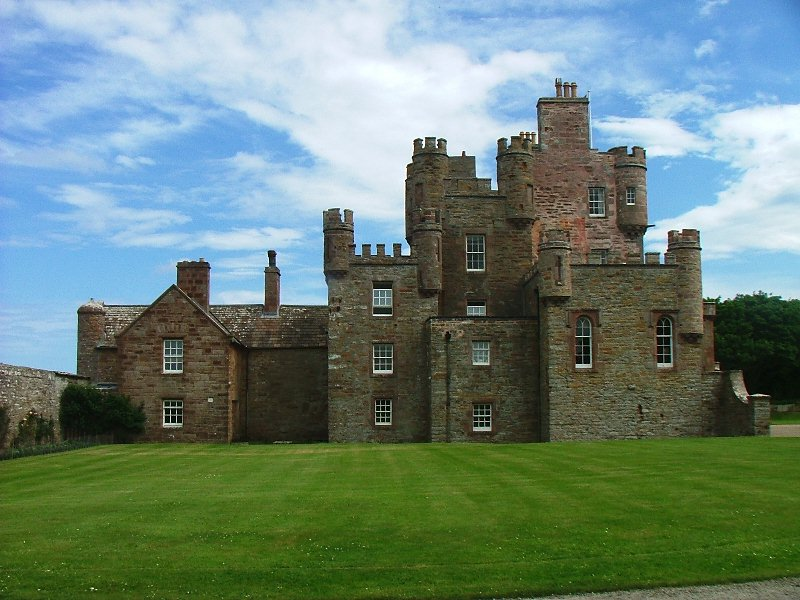
Castle of Mey (formerly Barrogill Castle), located in the north of Caithness, on the north coast of Scotland (2006).

Barrogill Castle was in a semi-derelict state when, in 1952, the estate was bought by Queen Elizabeth the Queen Mother, the widow of King George VI, who had died earlier that year. The Queen Mother set about restoring the castle for use as a holiday home, removing some of the 19th-century additions, and reinstated the castle's original name. As part of the restoration, the castle was for the first time supplied with electricity and water. Other work done in 1953–1954 included making the castle weathertight and habitable, as well as painting and plastering. The castle interior was also refurbished over the next few years. The west wing restoration was not completed until 1960.

The Queen Mother hung several portraits of the previous owners, the Earls of Caithness, around the castle. She regularly visited it in August and October from 1955 until her death in March 2002; the last visit was in October 2001.

In July 1996, the Queen Mother made the property, the policies and the farm over to the Queen Elizabeth Castle of Mey Trust, which has opened the castle and garden to the public regularly since her death. It is now open seven days a week from 1 May until 30 September each year, with a closed period of ten days at the end of July and the beginning of August, when King Charles III and Queen Camilla usually stay at Mey. The Trust opened a new Visitor Centre in early 2007, and had 29,000 visitors.

=== The Castle of Mey Trust ===
The Castle of Mey Trust was established by a Deed of Trust executed on 11 June 1996. Its president was the then Prince of Wales. The Trust would manage the property; its mandate was "to secure the future of the building, advance historical and architectural education, to develop the native breeds of Aberdeen Angus and Cheviot sheep and to undertake projects for the benefit of the local community", according to one report. After 2002, the Trust opened the castle for five months each summer to generate revenue that would sustain the property. In 2018, nearly 30,000 visits were recorded.

Maintenance work completed by the Trust in 2018, including roof repairs, rewiring of the interior and lime harling of the exterior.

==== New stewardship ====
On 1 January 2019, stewardship of the Trust passed to the then Prince's Foundation (later the King's Foundation). The president of the Foundation is Charles III. Since 1 January 2019, he has been not only the president of the Castle of Mey Trust but also its sole Trustee, through the Foundation. The Foundation stated its intention to retain the Trust's goals:

"...the preservation of buildings and monuments; the promotion of historical and architectural education; the preservation of the Aberdeen Angus breed of cattle, and the championing of wider benefits to the community, while the Duke of Rothesay and The Prince's Foundation is certain to make the continuation of his grandmother’s legacy a priority."

==== The Granary Lodge bed and breakfast ====
In early May 2019, the then Prince of Wales formally opened a new building, Granary Lodge, as a 10-bedroom bed and breakfast on the castle grounds. This building combined the previous stables and granary. During the planning stages, it was decided to have "eco-heating" and to use local materials and craftsmen where possible. Granary Lodge is one of the first ventures under the stewardship of the Prince's Foundation. The business is owned and operated by the Trust and planned to accept guests starting on 15 May 2019. Profits will go to maintaining and operating the estate as a tourist destination.

==== Public use ====
In January 2023, it was reported that the castle tearoom would open to the public every Tuesday until March as a warming centre, an initiative by the King's Foundation.

== In popular culture ==
The ruins of Barrogill Castle are the scene of a black mass in the Nick Carter-Killmaster series novel Spy Castle (1966).

The Queen Mother's purchase of the castle is featured in the Netflix show The Crown (episode 8 of the first season, "Pride & Joy").
