= Queenslandophilus =

Scientific classification
- Kingdom: Animalia
- Phylum: Arthropoda
- Subphylum: Myriapoda
- Class: Chilopoda
- Order: Geophilomorpha
- Family: Geophilidae
- Genus: Queenslandophilus; Verhoeff, 1925

Type species
- Arctogeophilus sjoestedti Verhoeff, 1925

Genus of centipedes

Queenslandophilus is a genus of soil centipedes in the family Geophilidae. This genus was described by German myriapodologist Karl Wilhelm Verhoeff in 1925. These centipedes are found in Australia, Japan, and North America.

== Description ==
Centipedes in this genus feature second maxillae with sclerotized ridges on the coxosternite, no sternal pores, and coxopleura with many scattered pores. The lateral parts of the labrum almost touch medially. The ultimate legs most often have claws.

These centipedes range from 1 cm to 6 cm in length and have 37 to 75 pairs of legs. The Japanese species Queenslandophilus monoporus and Q. macropalpus are notable for their small sizes, measuring only 10 mm and 15 mm in length, respectively. The species Q. elongatus, found in California, is notable for its large size, ranging from 40 mm to 63 mm in length. The species Q. macropalpus has only 37 leg pairs, the minimum number recorded in this genus, whereas Q. elongatus has 73 to 75 leg pairs, the maximum number recorded in this genus.

== Species ==
Valid species:

- Queenslandophilus elongatus (Verhoeff, 1938)
- Queenslandophilus macropalpus (Takakuwa, 1936)
- Queenslandophilus monoporus (Takakuwa, 1937)
- Queenslandophilus sjoestedti (Verhoeff, 1925)
- Queenslandophilus viridicans (Attems, 1927)
