= Strongylosoma sagittarius =

Scientific classification
- Kingdom: Animalia
- Phylum: Arthropoda
- Subphylum: Myriapoda
- Class: Diplopoda
- Order: Polydesmida
- Family: Paradoxosomatidae
- Genus: Strongylosoma
- Species: S. sagittarius

Binomial name
- Strongylosoma sagittarius Karsch, 1881

Species of myriapod

Strongylosoma sagittarius is a species of millipede that was described by Ferdinand Karsch in 1881.
