= Sepedonophilus =

Scientific classification
- Kingdom: Animalia
- Phylum: Arthropoda
- Subphylum: Myriapoda
- Class: Chilopoda
- Order: Geophilomorpha
- Family: Geophilidae
- Genus: Sepedonophilus; Attems, 1909

Synonyms
- Sepedonophilus Attems, 1909; Zelanion Chamberlin, 1920; Pachymeroides Chamberlin, 1920

Genus of centipedes

Sepedonophilus is a genus of three species of centipedes in the family Geophilidae. This genus is endemic to Australia, and was first described by Austrian myriapodologist Carl Attems in 1909. Centipedes in this genus feature scattered coxal pores and have no sternal pores; the lateral parts of the labrum almost touch medially, and the intermediate part is inconspicuous; the coxosternite of the second maxillae have peculiar anterior projections. These centipedes range from about 2 cm to 5 cm in length and have 49 to 79 pairs of legs. The smallest species in this genus, Sepedonophilus hodites, measures only 18 mm in length and has only 49 leg pairs, the minimum number recorded in this genus, whereas the largest species, S. perforatus, measures 50 mm in length and has 79 leg pairs, the maximum number recorded in this genus.

== Species ==
Valid species:

- Sepedonophilus attemsii (Verhoeff, 1925)
- Sepedonophilus hodites Chamberlin, 1940
- Sepedonophilus perforatus (Haase, 1887)
