= Strongylosoma vermiforme =

Scientific classification
- Kingdom: Animalia
- Phylum: Arthropoda
- Subphylum: Myriapoda
- Class: Diplopoda
- Order: Polydesmida
- Family: Paradoxosomatidae
- Genus: Strongylosoma
- Species: S. vermiforme

Binomial name
- Strongylosoma vermiforme Eydoux and Souleyet

Species of myriapod

Strongylosoma vermiforme is a species of millipede that was described by Joseph Fortuné Théodore Eydoux and Louis François Auguste Souleyet.
