= Strongylosoma vermiculare =

Scientific classification
- Kingdom: Animalia
- Phylum: Arthropoda
- Subphylum: Myriapoda
- Class: Diplopoda
- Order: Polydesmida
- Family: Paradoxosomatidae
- Genus: Strongylosoma
- Species: S. vermiculare

Binomial name
- Strongylosoma vermiculare Peters, 1864

Species of myriapod

Strongylosoma vermiculare is a species of millipede described by Wilhelm Peters in 1864.
