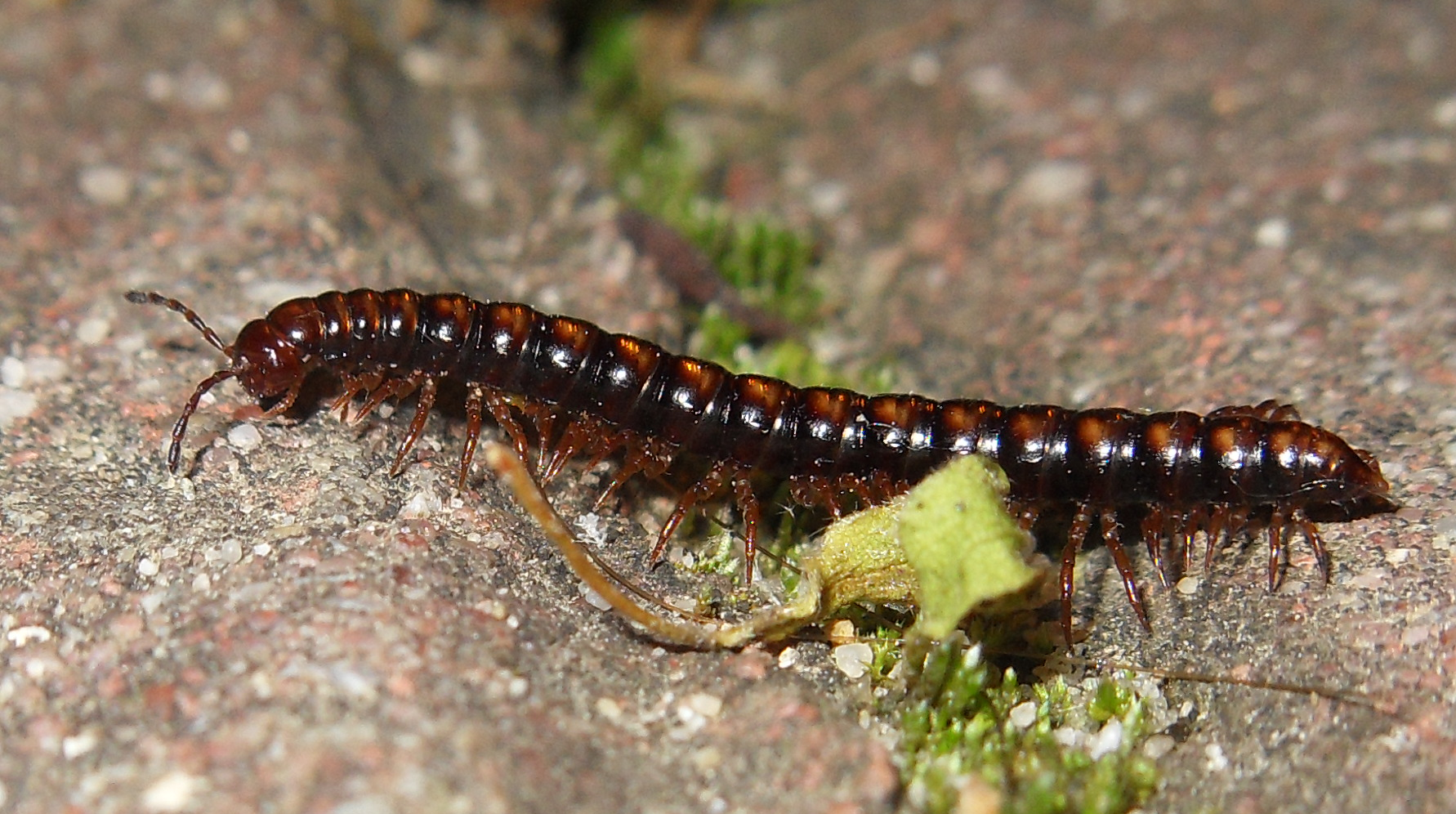

Scientific classification
- Kingdom: Animalia
- Phylum: Arthropoda
- Subphylum: Myriapoda
- Class: Diplopoda
- Order: Polydesmida
- Family: Paradoxosomatidae
- Genus: Strongylosoma
- Species: S. stigmatosum

Binomial name
- Strongylosoma stigmatosum (Eichwald, 1830)

Synonyms
- List: Julus stigmatosus Eichwald, 1830; Strongylosoma pallipes stigmatosum Olivier, 1792; Strongylosomum stigmatosus (Eichwald, 1830); Iulus pallipes Olivier, 1792; Julus pallipes Olivier, 1792; Polydesmus pallipes (Olivier, 1792); Strongilosoma pallipes (Olivier, 1792); Strongylosoma pallipes (Olivier, 1792); Strongylosoma pallipes pallipes (Olivier, 1792); Triarthrosoma pallipes (Olivier, 1792); Tropisoma pallipes (Olivier, 1792); Strongilosoma juloides Brandt; Strongylosoma corrugatum (C. L. Koch, 1847); Tropisoma corrugatum C. L. Koch, 1847; Strongylosoma ferrugineum (C. L. Koch, 1847); Tropisoma ferrugineum C. L. Koch, 1847; Strongylosoma vejdovskyi Nĕmec, 1895; Strongylosoma iuloides Brandt, 1833

= Strongylosoma stigmatosum =

Species of millipede

Strongylosoma stigmatosum is a species of diplopod that was described by Karl Eichwald in 1830. There are two subspecies assigned to this species:

- Strongylosoma stigmatosum balcanicum Schubart, 1934
- Strongylosoma stigmatosum stigmatosum (Eichwald, 1830)
