= Mesoschendyla cribrifera =

Scientific classification
- Kingdom: Animalia
- Phylum: Arthropoda
- Subphylum: Myriapoda
- Class: Chilopoda
- Order: Geophilomorpha
- Family: Schendylidae
- Genus: Mesoschendyla
- Species: M. cribrifera

Binomial name
- Mesoschendyla cribrifera Verhoeff, 1937

Species of centipede

Mesoschendyla cribrifera is a species of soil centipede in the family Schendylidae. This centipede is found in South Africa. This species features 55 pairs of legs in each sex and can reach 34 mm in length.

== Discovery and distribution ==
This species was first described in 1937 by the German myriapodologist Karl W. Verhoeff. He based the original description of this species on a sample of specimens including both sexes. These specimens were found in three different towns (Kamieskroon, Leliefontein, and Garies) in the Namaqualand region of the Northern Cape province of South Africa. A syntype is deposited in the Natural History Museum in London.

== Description ==
This species features 55 leg pairs in both sexes and can reach 34 mm in length. The body is pale and slender. The teeth on the labrum become indistinct in the middle. The last segment of the antennae features two sensory pits, one on each side, behind the middle of the segment. Behind the head, there is a prebasal plate (a short sclerite in front of the forcipular tergite). Two pairs of lappets project from the lateral margins of the first maxillae, one pair from the coxosternite and the other pair from the telopodites. The claws of the second maxillae expand on the inner side into a very delicate lamella that is smooth and simple on the outer side but appears to be finely striated on the distal and inner margin.

Fine sparse hairs cover the sternites, which usually feature fields of pores from the second through the 25th sternite. These pore-fields are triangular with a wide base on the anterior side and a rounded vertex pointed toward the posterior end. The pore-fields become delicate and progressively less distinct from the 20th to the 25th sternite. The basal element of each of the ultimate legs features one isolated pore. The hairs on the ultimate legs are so minute that these legs appear nearly smooth.

This centipede shares many traits with other species in the genus Mesoschendyla, including pore fields limited to the anterior sternites and a single pore on each of the ultimate legs. This species shares an especially extensive set of traits with M. rossi, another species in the same genus found in Zimbabwe. For example, like both sexes in M. cribrifera, the female holotype of M. rossi features 55 leg pairs. Furthermore, each species features two pairs of lappets on the first maxillae, a prebasal plate, and a labrum without distinct teeth in the middle. Moreover, both species feature two setosensoria (sensory pits) on the 14th (last) segment of the antennae, one on the outer face and the other on the inner face of this segment.

Other traits, however, distinguish M. cribrifera from M. rossi. For example, the posterior end of the sternite on the last leg-bearing segment is rounded in M. cribrifera but truncated with a straight rear margin in M. rossi, and the shape of the pore-fields is distinctly triangular in M. cribifera but circular in M. rossi. Furthermore, the sensory pits on the 14th segment of each antenna are located on the proximal half of this segment in M. cribrifera, but they are located on the distal quarter of this segment in M. rossi. Moreover, the ultimate legs appear smooth in M. cribrifera but bristle with setae in M. rossi.
