= Strongylosoma nitidum =

Scientific classification
- Kingdom: Animalia
- Phylum: Arthropoda
- Subphylum: Myriapoda
- Class: Diplopoda
- Order: Polydesmida
- Family: Paradoxosomatidae
- Genus: Strongylosoma
- Species: S. nitidum

Binomial name
- Strongylosoma nitidum Brölemann, 1902

Species of millipede

Strongylosoma nitidum is a species of diplopod that was first described by Henri W. Brölemann in 1902.
