= Strongylosoma nadari =

Scientific classification
- Kingdom: Animalia
- Phylum: Arthropoda
- Subphylum: Myriapoda
- Class: Diplopoda
- Order: Polydesmida
- Family: Paradoxosomatidae
- Genus: Strongylosoma
- Species: S. nadari

Binomial name
- Strongylosoma nadari Brölemann, 1896

Synonyms
- Strongylosomum nadari Brölemann, 1896

Species of millipede

Strongylosoma nadari is a species of diplopod that was first described by Henri W. Brölemann in 1896.
