= Queenslandophilus sjoestedti =

Scientific classification
- Kingdom: Animalia
- Phylum: Arthropoda
- Subphylum: Myriapoda
- Class: Chilopoda
- Order: Geophilomorpha
- Family: Geophilidae
- Genus: Queenslandophilus
- Species: Q. sjoestedti

Binomial name
- Queenslandophilus sjoestedti Verhoeff, 1925

Species of centipede

Queenslandophilus sjoestedti is a species of centipede in the Geophilidae family. It is endemic to Australia, and was first described in 1925 by German myriapodologist Karl Wilhelm Verhoeff.

== Description ==
The original description of this species is based on a female specimen measuring 27 mm in length with 55 pairs of legs.

== Distribution ==
The species occurs in north-east coastal Queensland.

== Behaviour ==
The centipedes are solitary terrestrial predators that inhabit plant litter, soil and rotting wood.
