= Strongylosoma japonicum =

Scientific classification
- Kingdom: Animalia
- Phylum: Arthropoda
- Subphylum: Myriapoda
- Class: Diplopoda
- Order: Polydesmida
- Family: Paradoxosomatidae
- Genus: Strongylosoma
- Species: S. japonicum

Binomial name
- Strongylosoma japonicum Peters, 1864

Synonyms
- Polydesmus japonicum Peters, 1864

Species of millipede

Strongylosoma japonicum is a species of diplopod that was first described by Wilhelm Peters in 1864.
