= Strongylosoma festai =

Scientific classification
- Kingdom: Animalia
- Phylum: Arthropoda
- Subphylum: Myriapoda
- Class: Diplopoda
- Order: Polydesmida
- Family: Paradoxosomatidae
- Genus: Strongylosoma
- Species: S. festai

Binomial name
- Strongylosoma festai Manfredi, 1939

Species of millipede

Strongylosoma festai is a species of diplopod in the family Paradoxosomatidae, described by Paula Manfredi in 1939.
