= Strongylosoma montivagum =

Scientific classification
- Kingdom: Animalia
- Phylum: Arthropoda
- Subphylum: Myriapoda
- Class: Diplopoda
- Order: Polydesmida
- Family: Paradoxosomatidae
- Genus: Strongylosoma
- Species: S. montivagum

Binomial name
- Strongylosoma montivagum Carl, 1912

Species of millipede

Strongylosoma montivagum is a species of diplopod that was first described by Jean Carl in 1912.
