= Maoriella australis =

Scientific classification
- Kingdom: Animalia
- Phylum: Arthropoda
- Subphylum: Myriapoda
- Class: Chilopoda
- Order: Geophilomorpha
- Family: Geophilidae
- Genus: Maoriella
- Species: M. australis

Binomial name
- Maoriella australis Archey, 1936

Species of centipede

Maoriella australis is a species of centipede in the Geophilidae family. It is endemic to Australia. It was first described in 1936 by New Zealand zoologist Gilbert Archey. Others have since suggested that M. australis could be a junior synonym for M. macrostigma.

== Description ==
The original description of this species is based on a specimen with 55 pairs of legs.

== Distribution ==
The species occurs in north-western Victoria. The type locality is Chillingollah, near Swan Hill.
