= Maoriella edentata =

Scientific classification
- Kingdom: Animalia
- Phylum: Arthropoda
- Subphylum: Myriapoda
- Class: Chilopoda
- Order: Geophilomorpha
- Family: Geophilidae
- Genus: Maoriella
- Species: M. edentata

Binomial name
- Maoriella edentata (Attems, 1947)

Synonyms
- Novaralius edentata Attems, 1947

Species of centipede

Maoriella edentata is a species of centipede in the Geophilidae family. It was first described in 1947 by Austrian myriapodologist Carl Attems.

== Description ==
The original description of this species is based on a specimen with 61 pairs of legs.

== Distribution ==
The species occurs in Polynesia. The type locality is Tahiti.
