= Strongylosoma bisulcatum =

Scientific classification
- Kingdom: Animalia
- Phylum: Arthropoda
- Subphylum: Myriapoda
- Class: Diplopoda
- Order: Polydesmida
- Family: Paradoxosomatidae
- Genus: Strongylosoma
- Species: S. bisulcatum

Binomial name
- Strongylosoma bisulcatum Fanzago, 1877

Species of millipede

Strongylosoma bisulcatum is a species of millipede in the family Paradoxosomatidae. It was first described in 1877.
