= Strongylosoma rubripes =

Scientific classification
- Kingdom: Animalia
- Phylum: Arthropoda
- Subphylum: Myriapoda
- Class: Diplopoda
- Order: Polydesmida
- Family: Paradoxosomatidae
- Genus: Strongylosoma
- Species: S. rubripes

Binomial name
- Strongylosoma rubripes L. Koch, 1867

Species of millipede

Strongylosoma rubripes is a species of diplopod that was first described by Ludwig Carl Christian Koch in 1867.
