= Strongylosoma rhodium =

Scientific classification
- Kingdom: Animalia
- Phylum: Arthropoda
- Subphylum: Myriapoda
- Class: Diplopoda
- Order: Polydesmida
- Family: Paradoxosomatidae
- Genus: Strongylosoma
- Species: S. rhodium

Binomial name
- Strongylosoma rhodium Brandt

Synonyms
- Trachydesmus rhodium Brandt

Species of myriapod

Strongylosoma rhodium is a species of millipede described by Johann Friedrich von Brandt.
