= Mesoschendyla =

Scientific classification
- Kingdom: Animalia
- Phylum: Arthropoda
- Subphylum: Myriapoda
- Class: Chilopoda
- Order: Geophilomorpha
- Family: Schendylidae
- Genus: Mesoschendyla; Attems, 1909

Type species
- Schendyla monopora Attems, 1909

Genus of centipedes

Mesoschendyla is a genus of soil centipedes in the family Schendylidae. These centipedes are found in Africa, Madagascar, Java, and Borneo. The Austrian myriapodologist Carl Attems originally proposed Mesoschendyla in 1909 as a subgenus within the genus Schendyla. The genus Mesochendyla is relatively small, containing only eight species. These centipedes resemble their close relatives in the genera Schendylops and Orygmadyla.

== Description ==
Centipedes in this genus feature fields of pores on the anterior sternites only. The main sternite of the last leg-bearing segment features is wide. The basal element of each of the ultimate legs features a single pore.

Centipedes in this genus range from 1 cm to 4 cm in length. These centipedes can have as few as 31 pairs of legs (in the Asian species M. javanica) or as many as 63 leg pairs (in the African species M. monopora and M. picturata). Both M. javanica and the African species M. franzi measure only 10 mm in length and are notable for their small size. Both M. monopora and M. picturata can reach 40 mm in length and are notable for their large size.

== Species ==
This genus includes the following species:

- Mesoschendyla cribrifera Verhoeff, 1937
- Mesoschendyla franzi Dobroruka, 1959
- Mesoschendyla javanica (Attems, 1907)
- Mesoschendyla leachi Crabill, 1968
- Mesoschendyla monopora (Attems, 1909)
- Mesoschendyla picturata Lawrence, 1966
- Mesoschendyla rossi Crabill, 1968
- Mesoschendyla weberi Verhoeff, 1940
