= Strongylosoma sanguineum =

Scientific classification
- Kingdom: Animalia
- Phylum: Arthropoda
- Subphylum: Myriapoda
- Class: Diplopoda
- Order: Polydesmida
- Family: Paradoxosomatidae
- Genus: Strongylosoma
- Species: S. sanguineum

Binomial name
- Strongylosoma sanguineum Silvestri, 1895

Species of millipede

Strongylosoma sanguineum is a species of diplopod that was first described by Filippo Silvestri in 1895.
