= Strongylosoma spilonotum =

Scientific classification
- Kingdom: Animalia
- Phylum: Arthropoda
- Subphylum: Myriapoda
- Class: Diplopoda
- Order: Polydesmida
- Family: Paradoxosomatidae
- Genus: Strongylosoma
- Species: S. spilonotum

Binomial name
- Strongylosoma spilonotum Gervais, 1847

Species of myriapod

Strongylosoma spilonotum is a species of millipede that was described by Paul Gervais in 1847.
