= Maoriella aucklandica =

Scientific classification
- Kingdom: Animalia
- Phylum: Arthropoda
- Subphylum: Myriapoda
- Class: Chilopoda
- Order: Geophilomorpha
- Family: Geophilidae
- Genus: Maoriella
- Species: M. aucklandica

Binomial name
- Maoriella aucklandica Attems, 1903

Species of centipede

Maoriella aucklandica is a species of centipede in the Geophilidae family. It is endemic to New Zealand. It was first described in 1903 by Austrian myriapodologist Carl Attems.

== Description ==
The original description of this species is based on a female specimen measuring 90 mm in length with 91 pairs of legs.

== Distribution ==
The species occurs on the North Island. The type locality is the Bay of Islands, in the Far North District.
