= Strongylosoma nietneri =

Scientific classification
- Kingdom: Animalia
- Phylum: Arthropoda
- Subphylum: Myriapoda
- Class: Diplopoda
- Order: Polydesmida
- Family: Paradoxosomatidae
- Genus: Strongylosoma
- Species: S. nietneri

Binomial name
- Strongylosoma nietneri Peters, 1864

Species of millipede

Strongylosoma nietneri is a species of millipede belonging to the family Paradoxosomatidae, first described in 1864 by Wilhelm Peters. It is endemic to Sri Lanka.
