= Strongylosoma quaesitum =

Scientific classification
- Kingdom: Animalia
- Phylum: Arthropoda
- Subphylum: Myriapoda
- Class: Diplopoda
- Order: Polydesmida
- Family: Paradoxosomatidae
- Genus: Strongylosoma
- Species: S. quaesitum

Binomial name
- Strongylosoma quaesitum Chamberlin, 1920

Species of myriapod

Strongylosoma quaesitum is a species of millipede described by Ralph Vary Chamberlin in 1920.
