= Steneurytion incisunguis =

Scientific classification
- Kingdom: Animalia
- Phylum: Arthropoda
- Subphylum: Myriapoda
- Class: Chilopoda
- Order: Geophilomorpha
- Family: Geophilidae
- Genus: Steneurytion
- Species: S. incisunguis

Binomial name
- Steneurytion incisunguis (Attems, 1911)

Synonyms
- Eurytion incisunguis Attems, 1911

Species of centipede

Steneurytion incisunguis is a species of centipede in the Geophilidae family. It is endemic to Australia, and was first described in 1911 by Austrian myriapodologist Carl Attems.

== Description ==
The original description of this species was based on a specimen measuring 24 mm in length with 51 pairs of legs.

== Distribution ==
The species occurs in south-west Western Australia.

== Behaviour ==
The centipedes are solitary terrestrial predators that inhabit plant litter, soil and rotting wood.
