= Strongylosoma erucaria =

Scientific classification
- Kingdom: Animalia
- Phylum: Arthropoda
- Subphylum: Myriapoda
- Class: Diplopoda
- Order: Polydesmida
- Family: Paradoxosomatidae
- Genus: Strongylosoma
- Species: S. erucaria

Binomial name
- Strongylosoma erucaria Butler, 1876

Species of myriapod

Strongylosoma erucaria is a species of diplopod that was described by Arthur Gardiner Butler in 1876.
