= Mecistocephalus pseustes =

Scientific classification
- Kingdom: Animalia
- Phylum: Arthropoda
- Subphylum: Myriapoda
- Class: Chilopoda
- Order: Geophilomorpha
- Family: Mecistocephalidae
- Genus: Mecistocephalus
- Species: M. pseustes

Binomial name
- Mecistocephalus pseustes (Chamberlin, 1939)

Synonyms
- Dasyptyx pseustes Chamberlin, 1920

Species of centipede

Mecistocephalus pseustes is a species of soil centipede in the Mecistocephalidae family. This centipede is found in Indonesia on the island of New Guinea. This species features 51 pairs of legs rather than the 49 leg pairs usually observed in the genus Mecistocephalus.

== Discovery and distribution ==
This species was first described in 1939 by American zoologist Ralph Vary Chamberlin. He based the original description of this species on two specimens collected in 1920 by the Dutch biologist Willem Cornelis van Heurn in Prauwenbivak in Western New Guinea. This species is known only from Western New Guinea.

== Taxonomy ==
Chamberlin originally described this centipede under the name Dasyptyx pseustes. In 1929, the Austrian myriapodologist Carl Attems deemed Dasyptyx to be a subgenus in the genus Mecistocephalus. In 2003, authorities suggested that Dasyptyx is a junior synonym of Mecistocephalus. Authorities now regard Mecistocephalus as the valid name for Dasyptyx.

== Description ==
This species features 51 leg-bearing segments and can reach 40 mm in length. This centipede is brown darkened by a dense network of black pigment. The head is elongated, with convex lateral margins that converge toward a straight posterior margin. The posterior margins of the side pieces of the labrum are curved, conspicuously concave, and form an acute angle at the inner corner that extends distinctly beyond the posterior end of the adjacent middle piece. The labrum also features a dense cover of fine setae. The mandible features about 21 lamellae. The first lamella is small, with four slender teeth. The forcipules are large, but the two teeth on the first article are reduced to small nodules, and the other articles feature no teeth. The furrows on the sternites are forked at the anterior end. Small pores of various sizes are evenly distributed on the basal elements of the ultimate legs.

This species shares many traits with other species in the genus Mecistocephalus. For example, like other species in this genus, the species M. psuestes features a head that is evidently longer than wide. Furthermore, like many other species in this genus, this species features two teeth on the first article of the forcipules.

This species shares a more extensive set of distinctive traits with another species in the same genus, M. gigas, which is also found on the island of New Guinea. For example, like the species M. psuestes, the species M. gigas features 51 leg pairs and furrows on the sternites that are forked at the anterior end. Furthermore, in both of these species, each of the lamellae on the mandible bears teeth only at the distal end and features a long stalk bearing a row of cilia instead of teeth. Authorities placed both M. psuestes and M. gigas in the taxon Dasyptyx, first proposed as a genus, then deemed a subgenus, based on this feature of the mandible. Moreover, the mandibles in these two species feature similar numbers of lamellae and teeth.

The species M. psuestes can be distinguished from M. gigas, however, based on other traits. For example, the posterior margins of the side pieces of the labrum are curved and concave in M. psuestes but mostly straight in M. gigas. Furthermore, each margin forms an acute angle at the inner corner that protrudes conspicuously beyond the posterior end of the middle piece in M. psuestes, whereas these corners remain close to the posterior end of the middle piece in M. gigas. Moreover, the teeth on the lamellae of the mandible are longer in M. psuestes than in M. gigas.
