= Marsikomerus =

Scientific classification
- Kingdom: Animalia
- Phylum: Arthropoda
- Subphylum: Myriapoda
- Class: Chilopoda
- Order: Geophilomorpha
- Family: Schendylidae
- Genus: Marsikomerus; Attems, 1938

Type species
- Marsikomerus pacificus Attems,1938

Synonyms
- Lanonyx Chamberlin, 1953; Simoporus Chamberlin & Mulaik, 1940

Genus of centipedes

Marsikomerus is a genus of centipedes in the family Schendylidae. This genus was described by Austrian myriapodologist Carl Attems in 1938. Species in this genus are found in Mexico and in the United States (in Arkansas, Texas, and Hawaii).

== Description ==
Centipedes in this genus feature sternal pore-fields that are subcircular or transversally elliptical and found only on the anterior part of the trunk. The ultimate leg-bearing segment has a single pore on each coxopleuron, a wide metasternite, and legs without claws. These centipedes range from 1 cm to about 5 cm in length and have 39 to 61 pairs of legs. Males of the smallest species in this genus, Marsikomerus arcanus, measure only 10 mm in length and have only 39 leg pairs, the minimum recorded for this genus. The largest species in this genus, M. bryanus, can reach 47 mm in length and can have as few as 39 leg pairs or as many as 57 pairs. The original description of the species M. texanus reports as few as 55 leg pairs or as many as 61 pairs, the maximum recorded for this genus.

== Species ==
There are four valid species:

- Marsikomerus arcanus (Crabill, 1961)
- Marsikomerus bryanus (Chamberlin, 1926)
- Marsikomerus koestneri (Chamberlin, 1940)
- Marsikomerus texanus (Chamberlin, 1940)
