= Steneurytion morbosus =

Scientific classification
- Kingdom: Animalia
- Phylum: Arthropoda
- Subphylum: Myriapoda
- Class: Chilopoda
- Order: Geophilomorpha
- Family: Geophilidae
- Genus: Steneurytion
- Species: S. morbosus

Binomial name
- Steneurytion morbosus (Hutton, 1877)

Synonyms
- Himantarium morbosum Hutton, 1877; Sepedonophilus morbosus (Hutton, 1877; Pachymeroides alter Chamberlin, 1920; Zelanion (Zelanoides) similis Chamberlin, 1920; Zelanion (Zelanoides) paucipes Chamberlin, 1920

Species of centipede

Steneurytion morbosus is a species of centipede in the Geophilidae family. This species was first described in 1877 by New Zealand naturalist Frederick Hutton. Authorities would later deem Pachymeroides alter, Zelanion paucipes, and Zelanion similis to be junior synonyms. Some authorities do not include this species in the genus Steneurytion.

== Description ==
The original description of this species notes a pale reddish yellow body with a reddish brown head and a length of 1.85 inches. A more detailed description of the type material notes a female specimen with 39 pairs of legs and a maximum length of 43 mm. A more recent description of the species based on a larger sample reports 39 to 41 segments. The original descriptions of three junior synonyms, however, report 33, 37, and 39 pairs of legs.

== Distribution ==
The species occurs in Victoria, south-eastern Australia, as well as in New Zealand.

== Behaviour ==
The centipedes are solitary terrestrial predators that inhabit plant litter, soil and rotting wood.
