= Sundanina modiglianii =

Scientific classification
- Kingdom: Animalia
- Phylum: Arthropoda
- Subphylum: Myriapoda
- Class: Diplopoda
- Order: Polydesmida
- Family: Paradoxosomatidae
- Genus: Sundanina
- Species: S. modiglianii

Binomial name
- Sundanina modiglianii (Silvestri, 1895)

Synonyms
- Strongylosoma modiglianii Silvestri, 1895

Species of millipede

Sundanina modiglianii is a species of diplopod that was first described by Filippo Silvestri in 1895.

== Distribution ==
This species is found in Indonesia.
