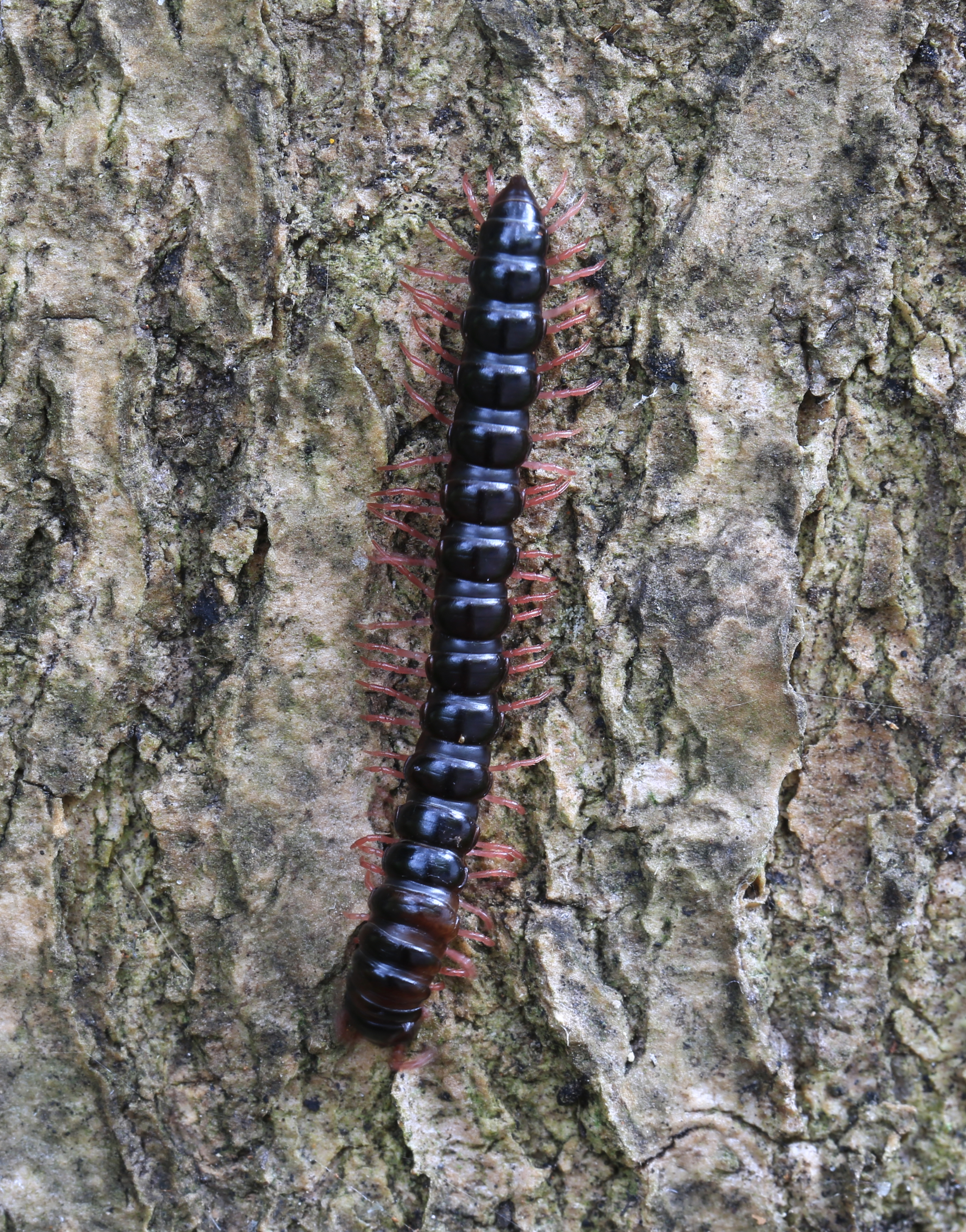

Scientific classification
- Kingdom: Animalia
- Phylum: Arthropoda
- Subphylum: Myriapoda
- Class: Diplopoda
- Order: Polydesmida
- Family: Paradoxosomatidae
- Genus: Heterocladosoma
- Species: H. bifalcatum

Binomial name
- Heterocladosoma bifalcatum (Silvestri, 1898)

Synonyms
- Eustrongylosoma bifalcatum Silvestri, 1898; Australiosoma bifalcatum Brölemann, 1913

= Heterocladosoma bifalcatum =

Species of millipede

Heterocladosoma bifalcatum is a common species of millipede found in eastern Australia.

== Description ==
This millipede has a striking colouration: the body is blackish-brown while the legs, antennae and sternites are red. It can be distinguished from other Heterocladosoma by: the largest tibiotarsal branch apically tapering and curving widely laterad; the telopodite of the gonopods being narrow in profile; and the femoro-solenomerite being almost straight.

== Behaviour ==
Heterocladosoma bifalcatum can be found in log debris on the ground and also under the bark of trees. The species is most active during overcast/rainy weather and in the early morning.
