= Short-range endemic invertebrates =

Short-range endemic (SRE) invertebrates are animals that display restricted geographic distributions, nominally less than 10,000 km^{2}, that may also be disjunct and highly localised. The most appropriate analogy is that of an island, where the movement of fauna is restricted by the surrounding marine waters, therefore isolating the fauna from other terrestrial populations. Isolating mechanisms and features such as roads, urban infrastructure, large creek lines and ridges can act to prevent the dispersal and gene flow of the less mobile invertebrate species. Subterranean fauna, which include stygofauna and troglofauna, typically comprise short-range endemics.

== Representative examples ==
Several animal groups studied in Australia consist largely of short-range endemics, including freshwater and terrestrial gastropods (snails and slugs), earthworms, velvet worms, mygalomorph spiders, schizomids, millipedes, phreatoicidean crustaceans, and freshwater crayfish.

== Categories of short-range endemism ==
Currently, there is no accepted system to define the varying probabilities of a species to be an SRE. The uncertainty in categorising a specimen as SRE originates in a number of factors including:

- Poor regional survey density (sometimes taxon-specific): A regional fauna is simply not known well enough to assess the distribution of species. This factor also considers that simply because a species has not been found regionally, does not mean it is really absent; this confirmation (‘negative proof’) is almost impossible to obtain (“absence of proof is not proof of absence”).
- Lack of taxonomic resolution: many potential SRE taxa (based on preferences for typical SRE habitats, SRE status of closely related species, or morphological peculiarities such as troglomorphism) have never been taxonomically treated and identification to species level is very difficult or impossible as species-specific character systems have not been defined. Good taxonomic resolution does not necessarily require a published revision, but generally requires a taxonomist to be actively working on this group or a well-established, preferably publicly available, reference collection (i.e. museum collection).
- Problems of identification: SRE surveys often recover life stages of potential SRE taxa that cannot be confidently identified based on morphological characters, even if revisions exist. These include, for example, juvenile or female millipedes, mygalomorph spiders and scorpions. Molecular techniques are increasingly being employed to overcome these identification problems.

Life stages of species that cannot be identified at the species level, e.g. some females and juveniles, are assessed based on the knowledge of the higher taxon they belong to, i.e. family or genus. For example, all juvenile or female Antichiropus millipedes would be classified as 'confirmed SRE' as all but two of the 120+ known species in this genus are considered SREs.

Although the different categories of 'SRE-likelihood' may help to set conservation priorities, SRE taxa of all categories should be assessed on their merit, in order to determine appropriate conservation measures that adhere to the Precautionary Principle within environmental impact assessments. That is, "where there are threats of serious or irreversible environmental damage, lack of full scientific certainty should not be used as a reason to postpone measures to prevent environmental degradation."

== See also ==
- Endemism
- Biological dispersal
