= Maoriella ecdema =

Scientific classification
- Kingdom: Animalia
- Phylum: Arthropoda
- Subphylum: Myriapoda
- Class: Chilopoda
- Order: Geophilomorpha
- Family: Geophilidae
- Genus: Maoriella
- Species: M. ecdema

Binomial name
- Maoriella ecdema Crabill, 1964

Species of centipede

Maoriella ecdema is a species of centipede in the Geophilidae family. It is endemic to New Zealand. It was first described in 1964 by American zoologist Ralph Crabill.

== Description ==
The original description of this species is based on six specimens ranging from 31 mm to 36 mm in length, including three females with 55 or 57 pairs of legs and three males with 53 pairs of legs.

== Distribution ==
The species occurs in the Chatham Islands. The type locality is Port Hutt.
