= Trogodesmus =

Scientific classification
- Domain: Eukaryota
- Kingdom: Animalia
- Phylum: Arthropoda
- Subphylum: Myriapoda
- Class: Diplopoda
- Order: Polydesmida
- Family: Paradoxosomatidae
- Genus: Trogodesmus; Pocock, 1895

Genus of millipedes

Trogodesmus is a genus of millipedes belonging to the family Paradoxosomatidae.

Species:

- Trogodesmus bicolor Pocock, 1895
- Trogodesmus helvolus (Attems, 1936)
- Trogodesmus nigrescens Pocock, 1895
- Trogodesmus uncinatus (Attems, 1936)
- Trogodesmus vittatus Pocock, 1895
