= Sepedonophilus hodites =

Scientific classification
- Kingdom: Animalia
- Phylum: Arthropoda
- Subphylum: Myriapoda
- Class: Chilopoda
- Order: Geophilomorpha
- Family: Geophilidae
- Genus: Sepedonophilus
- Species: S. hodites

Binomial name
- Sepedonophilus hodites (Chamberlin, 1940)

Species of centipede

Sepedonophilus hodites is a species of centipede in the Geophilidae family. It is endemic to Australia, and was first described in 1940 by American biologist Ralph Vary Chamberlin.

== Description ==
The original description of this species is based on a male specimen measuring 18 mm in length with 49 pairs of legs.

== Distribution ==
The species occurs in most Australian states. It has also been recorded in Hawaii as an adventive species, though is probably not established there.

== Behaviour ==
The centipedes are solitary terrestrial predators that inhabit plant litter, soil and rotting wood.
