= Maoriella macrostigma =

Scientific classification
- Kingdom: Animalia
- Phylum: Arthropoda
- Subphylum: Myriapoda
- Class: Chilopoda
- Order: Geophilomorpha
- Family: Geophilidae
- Genus: Maoriella
- Species: M. macrostigma

Binomial name
- Maoriella macrostigma Attems, 1903

Synonyms
- Mesoleptodon laetus Chamberlin, 1920

Species of centipede

Maoriella macrostigma is a species of centipede in the Geophilidae family. It is endemic to New Zealand. It was first described in 1903 by Austrian myriapodologist Carl Attems.

== Description ==
The original description of this species is based on female specimens ranging from 48 mm to 55 mm in length with 63 or 65 pairs of legs, but this species can have as few as 55 segments, and specimens with 61 segments are common.

== Distribution ==
The species occurs on the North Island.
