= Steneurytion dux =

Scientific classification
- Kingdom: Animalia
- Phylum: Arthropoda
- Subphylum: Myriapoda
- Class: Chilopoda
- Order: Geophilomorpha
- Family: Geophilidae
- Genus: Steneurytion
- Species: S. dux

Binomial name
- Steneurytion dux (Chamberlin, 1920)

Synonyms
- Zelanion dux Chamberlin, 1920

Species of centipede

Steneurytion dux is a species of centipede in the Geophilidae family. It was described in 1920 by American myriapodologist Ralph Vary Chamberlin. This species can reach 44 mm in length and has 49 to 53 pairs of legs.

== Distribution ==
The species occurs in New Zealand. Type localities are Plimmerton and Day's Bay, Wellington.
