= Maoriella zelanica =

Scientific classification
- Kingdom: Animalia
- Phylum: Arthropoda
- Subphylum: Myriapoda
- Class: Chilopoda
- Order: Geophilomorpha
- Family: Geophilidae
- Genus: Maoriella
- Species: M. zelanica

Binomial name
- Maoriella zelanica (Chamberlin, 1920)

Synonyms
- Philogeonus zeylanica Chamberlin, 1920

Species of centipede

Maoriella zelanica is a species of centipede in the Geophilidae family. It is endemic to New Zealand. It was first described in 1920 by American biologist Ralph Vary Chamberlin.

== Description ==
The original description of this species is based on a specimen measuring 28 mm in length with 47 pairs of legs, but this species can have from 41 to 49 leg pairs.

== Distribution ==
The species occurs on the North Island. The type locality is Lake Takopema, near Auckland.
