= Steneurytion hawaiiensis =

Scientific classification
- Kingdom: Animalia
- Phylum: Arthropoda
- Subphylum: Myriapoda
- Class: Chilopoda
- Order: Geophilomorpha
- Family: Geophilidae
- Genus: Steneurytion
- Species: S. hawaiiensis

Binomial name
- Steneurytion hawaiiensis (Chamberlin, 1953)

Synonyms
- Zelanion hawaiiensis Chamberlin,1920

Species of centipede

Steneurytion hawaiiensis is a species of centipede in the Geophilidae family. It was described in 1953 by American myriapodologist Ralph Vary Chamberlin. This species is known from a single male specimen measuring 28 mm in length with 39 pairs of legs.

== Distribution ==
The species occurs in the Hawaiian Islands. The type locality is Hawaii.
