= Marsikomerus bryanus =

Scientific classification
- Kingdom: Animalia
- Phylum: Arthropoda
- Subphylum: Myriapoda
- Class: Chilopoda
- Order: Geophilomorpha
- Family: Schendylidae
- Genus: Marsikomerus
- Species: M. bryanus

Binomial name
- Marsikomerus bryanus (Chamberlin, 1926)

Synonyms
- Lanonyx lanaius Chamberlin,1953; Marsikomerus pacificus Attems, 1938

Species of centipede

Marsikomerus bryanus is a species of centipede in the Lithobiidae family. It was described in 1926 by American myriapodologist Ralph Vary Chamberlin.

== Description ==
This species ranges from yellow to orange in colour, can reach up to 47 mm in length, and has 39 to 57 pairs of legs.

== Distribution ==
The species occurs in the Hawaiian Islands. The type locality is Hawaii.
