= Sepedonophilus perforatus =

Scientific classification
- Kingdom: Animalia
- Phylum: Arthropoda
- Subphylum: Myriapoda
- Class: Chilopoda
- Order: Geophilomorpha
- Family: Geophilidae
- Genus: Sepedonophilus
- Species: S. perforatus

Binomial name
- Sepedonophilus perforatus (Haase, 1887)

Synonyms
- Geophilus concolor var. perforatus Haase, 1887

Species of centipede

Sepedonophilus perforatus is a species of centipede in the Geophilidae family. It is endemic to Australia and was first described in 1887 by German entomologist Erich Haase.

== Description ==
The original description of this species is based on a male specimen measuring 50 mm in length, with 79 pairs of legs.

== Distribution ==
The species occurs in eastern Queensland. The type locality is Gayndah.

== Behaviour ==
The centipedes are solitary terrestrial predators that inhabit plant litter, soil and rotting wood.
