= Steneurytion antipodum =

Scientific classification
- Kingdom: Animalia
- Phylum: Arthropoda
- Subphylum: Myriapoda
- Class: Chilopoda
- Order: Geophilomorpha
- Family: Geophilidae
- Genus: Steneurytion
- Species: S. antipodum

Binomial name
- Steneurytion antipodum (Pocock, 1891)

Synonyms
- Zelanion curtus Chamberlin,1920; Zelanion librius Chamberlin,1920; Pachymeroides mimeticus Chamberlin,1920; Philosogus oligus Chamberlin, 1920; Geophilus schauinslandi Attems,1903; Geophilus sitocola Attems,1903

Species of centipede

Steneurytion antipodum is a species of centipede in the Geophilidae family. It was described in 1891 by British zoologist Reginald Innes Pocock. This species can reach 38 mm in length and has 37 to 41 pairs of legs, usually 39 pairs in each sex.

== Distribution ==
The species occurs in New Zealand. Type localities are Maungatua and Wellington.
