= F. G. Heathcote =

Scottish zoologist

Frederick Granville Heathcote (8 December 1857 – 16 March 1914) was a Scottish zoologist who inherited the Castle of Mey from George Sinclair, 15th Earl of Caithness in 1889. As a condition of the inheritance he legally changed his name to Frederick Granville Sinclair.

== Life ==
Frederick Granville Heathcote was born on 8 December 1857 to Reverend Robert Boothby Heathcote and Elizabeth Bridget Wells. He graduated from Trinity College, Cambridge with a Master of Arts in 1885. On 18 October 1888, at age 31, he married Agnes Charlotte Barnes, daughter of Thomas J. Barnes. In 1889 as a condition of inheriting the Castle of Mey, then known as Barrogill Castle, he and his wife legally adopted the surname Sinclair. He held the offices of Deputy Lieutenant of Caithness, Justice of the Peace for Cambridge, and Justice of the Peace for Caithness. He died on 16 March 1914.

== Publications ==
Frederick was a zoologist with a particular interest in Myriapoda, publishing works on his expeditions including one to the Malay Peninsula. His other works include elementary texts on zoology and other original research on insects, myriapoda, and Peripatus. He is attributed with 41 works in 90 publications.
