= Imbert-Terry baronets =

Baronetcy in the Baronetage of the United Kingdom

The Imbert-Terry Baronetcy, of Strete Ralegh in Whimple in the County of Devon, is a title in the Baronetage of the United Kingdom. It was created on 2 July 1917 for Henry Imbert-Terry. He was Chairman of the Central Organization Committee of the Conservative and Unionist Party from 1907 to 1917.

The first Baronet's sister, Mary Anne Abbot Imbert-Terry (1844–1936), married Rev. Herbert Athill, rector of Digswell, Herts., and was thus paternal grandmother of the literary editor and writer Diana Athill.

The second Baronet, Sir Henry Bouhier Imbert-Terry, was a lieutenant-colonel in the Royal Artillery and served as High Sheriff of Devon in 1948, just as his brother, Capt Frederic Bouhier Imbert-Terry, was in 1928.

The family is of French origin (originally simply 'Imbert', later incorporating the name of their Vendean land property of 'la Terrière' in their surname as 'Terry'); the first Baronet was son of Henri Imbert-Terry, seigneur de la Terrière, who lived at Le Barbin, Viellevigne, France and 17, Chester Terrace, Regent's Park, London; previous generations had owned other fiefs, including at Choltière and Malescot.

== Imbert-Terry baronets, of Strete Ralegh (1917) ==
- Sir Henry Machu Imbert-Terry, 1st Baronet (1854–1938)
- Sir Henry Bouhier Imbert-Terry, 2nd Baronet (1885–1962)
- Sir Edward Henry Bouhier Imbert-Terry, 3rd Baronet (1920–1978)
- Sir Andrew Henry Bouhier Imbert-Terry, 4th Baronet (1945–1985)
- Sir Michael Edward Stanley Imbert-Terry, 5th Baronet (born 1950)

The heir apparent is the present holder's eldest son Brychan Edward Imbert-Terry (born 1975).

== Sources ==
- Kidd, Charles, Williamson, David (editors). Debrett's Peerage and Baronetage (1990 edition). New York: St Martin's Press, 1990.
- Leigh Rayment's list of baronets
