= Mesoschendyla picturata =

Scientific classification
- Kingdom: Animalia
- Phylum: Arthropoda
- Subphylum: Myriapoda
- Class: Chilopoda
- Order: Geophilomorpha
- Family: Schendylidae
- Genus: Mesoschendyla
- Species: M. picturata

Binomial name
- Mesoschendyla picturata Lawrence, 1966

Species of centipede

Mesoschendyla picturata is a species of soil centipede in the family Schendylidae. This centipede is found in South Africa. This species is notable for featuring 63 pairs of legs and for reaching 40 mm in length, the maximum leg number and largest size recorded in the genus Mesoschendyla.

== Discovery ==
This species was first described in 1966 by the South African myriapodologist Reginald F. Lawrence. He based the original description of this species on three specimens, one male and two females. These specimens were collected in 1963 near Letaba in Kruger National Park in South Africa.

== Description ==
This species features 63 leg pairs in both sexes. The male type specimen measures 37.5 mm in length, and the female measures 40 mm in length. The head features a few scattered short setae. Small short bristles appear on the sixth segment of the antennae, then become progressively more numerous on more distal segments. The margin of the labrum features 19 stout triangular teeth, and the mandible features eight teeth. Each of the second maxillae ends in a claw. The tergites feature distinct furrows that divide the surface into three parts, with the middle part somewhat narrower than the lateral parts.

The body is a pale yellow with a variegated darker pattern. The tergites are darker on the anterior and posterior margins, with larger dark areas on segments toward the posterior end of the body. These areas form two narrow parallel bars in the middle of the segments in the middle and posterior parts of the body. These bars become quite distinct on the last ten tergites. The pleurites also feature indistinct small spots and mottling. The ventral surface of the anterior segments also feature a few indistinct marks, but the middle sternites feature a short anterior bar in the middle with a diffuse larger mark toward the posterior and small round spots on the corners. These marks are more distinct than those on the dorsal surface but disappear for the last ten sternites.

Pores are absent on first sternite, but the second sternite features a small round field of twelve or thirteen pores. These pore fields become larger in succeeding sternites until the 27th or 28th sternite, where they cease. The telson lacks terminal pores. The basal element of each of the ultimate legs features a single large pore. The segments of the ultimate legs of the male are stout and densely covered with short setae. The ultimate legs of the female are less swollen, feature smaller pores, and are covered with fewer but markedly longer setae than those found on the male.

This centipede shares many traits with other species in the genus Mesoschendyla, including pore fields limited to the anterior sternites and a single pore on each of the ultimate legs. This species especially resembles M. monopora, another species in the same genus that matches M. picturata in terms of size and number of legs: Like the species M. picturata, the species M. monopora can reach 40 mm in length and includes females with as many as 63 leg pairs. The species M. monopora is also found in South Africa. The species M. picturata can be distinguished from M. monopora, however, based on other traits. For example, small bristles appear on the antennae in M. monopora starting from the first segment, but in M. picturata, these bristles do not appear until the sixth segment.
