= Lang Biang – Đà Lạt =

Lang Biang – Đà Lạt Lang Biang – Đà Lạt ward Lạc Dương
- ward
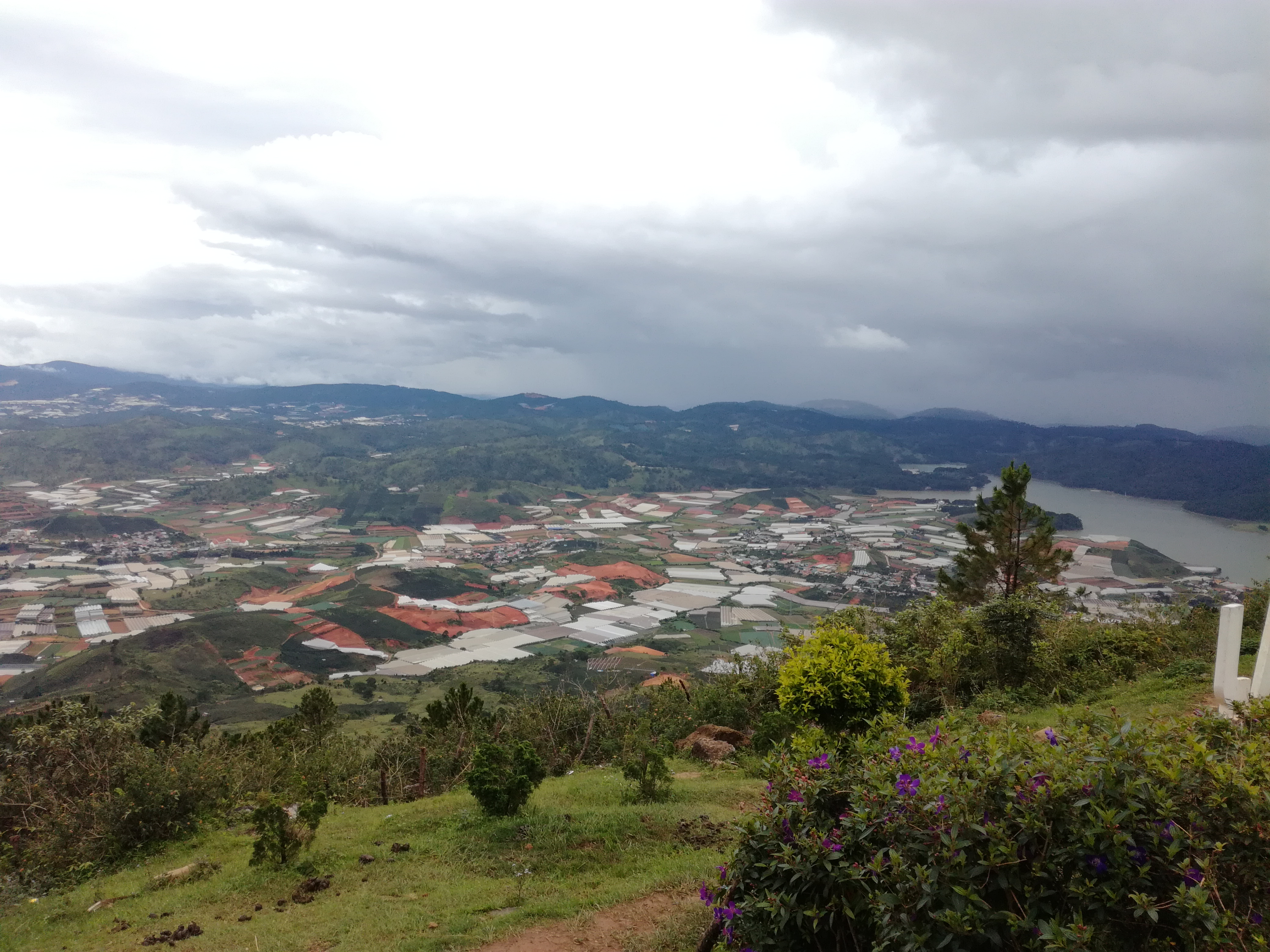
- Lạc Dương township viewed from Langbiang Mountain

- Location in Vietnam
- Coordinates: 12.008665°N 108.419040°E
- Country: Vietnam
- Province: Lâm Đồng
- Region: Central Highlands
- Founded: 1979

Area
  - Total: 27.26 sq mi (70.61 km^{2})

Population (2013)
  - Total: 7,942
  - Density: 290/sq mi (112/km^{2})
- Time zone: UTC+07:00

Lang Biang – Đà Lạt is a ward (phường) of Lâm Đồng province, Vietnam.
