= Invertebrate zoology =

Study of animals without a backbone

Invertebrate zoology is the subdiscipline of zoology that consists of the study of invertebrates, animals without a backbone (a structure which is found only in fish, amphibians, reptiles, birds and mammals).

Invertebrates are a vast and very diverse group of animals that includes sponges, echinoderms, tunicates, numerous different phyla of worms, molluscs, arthropods and many additional phyla. Single-celled organisms or protists are usually not included within the same group as invertebrates.

== Subdivisions ==
Invertebrates represent 97% of all named animal species, and because of that fact, this subdivision of zoology has many further subdivisions, including but not limited to:

- Arthropodology - the study of arthropods, which includes

- Arachnology - the study of spiders and other arachnids
- Entomology - the study of insects
- Carcinology - the study of crustaceans
- Myriapodology - the study of centipedes, millipedes, and other myriapods

- Cnidariology - the study of Cnidaria
- Helminthology - the study of parasitic worms.
- Malacology - the study of mollusks, which includes

- Conchology - the study of Mollusk shells.
- Limacology - the study of slugs.
- Teuthology - the study of cephalopods.

- Invertebrate paleontology - the study of fossil invertebrates

These divisions are sometimes further divided into more specific specialties. For example, within arachnology, acarology is the study of mites and ticks; within entomology, lepidoptery is the study of butterflies and moths, myrmecology is the study of ants and so on. Marine invertebrates are all those invertebrates that exist in marine habitats.

== History ==
=== Early Modern Era ===
In the early modern period starting in the late 16th century, invertebrate zoology saw growth in the number of publications made and improvement in the experimental practices associated with the field. (Insects are one of the most diverse groups of organisms on Earth. They play important roles in ecosystems, including pollination, natural enemies, saprophytes, and biological information transfer.)

One of the major works to be published in the area of zoology was Conrad Gessner's Historia animalium, which was published in numerous editions from 1551 to 1587. Though it was a work more generally addressing zoology in the large sense, it did contain information on insect life. Much of the information came from older works; Gessner restated the work of Pliny the Elder and Aristotle while mixing old knowledge of the natural history of insects with his own observations.

With the invention of the Microscope in 1599 came a new way of observing the small creatures that fall under the umbrella of invertebrate. Robert Hooke, who worked out of the Royal Society in England, conducted observation of insects—including some of their larval forms—and other invertebrates, such as ticks. His Micrographia, published in 1665, included illustrations and written descriptions of the things he saw under the microscope.

Others also worked with the microscope following its acceptance as a scientific tool. Francesco Redi, an Italian physician and naturalist, used a microscope for observation of invertebrates, but is known for his work in disproving the theory of spontaneous generation. Redi managed to prove that flies did not spontaneously arise from rotting meat. He conducted controlled experiments and detailed observation of the fly life cycle in order to do so. Redi also worked in the description and illustration of parasites for both plants and animals.

Other men were also conducting research into pests and parasites at this time. Felix Plater, a Swiss physician, worked to differentiate between two types of tape worm. He also wrote descriptions of both the worms he observed and the effects these worms had on their hosts.

Following the publication of Francis Bacon's ideas about the value of experimentation in the sciences came a shift toward true experimental efforts in the biological sciences, including invertebrate zoology. Jan Swammerdam, a Dutch microscopist, supported an effort to work for a 'modern' science over blind belief in the work of ancient philosophers. He worked—like Redi—to disprove spontaneous generation using experimental techniques. Swammerdam also made a number of advancements in the study of anatomy and physiology. In the field of entomology, he conducted a number of dissections of insects and made detailed observations of the internal structures of these specimens. Swammerdam also worked on a classification of insects based on life histories; he managed to contribute to the literature proving that an egg, larva, pupa, and adult are indeed the same individual.

=== 18th and 19th centuries ===
In the 18th century, the study of invertebrates focused on the naming of species that were relevant to economic pursuits, such as agricultural pests. Entomology was changing in big ways very quickly, as many naturalists and zoologists were working with hexapods.

Work was also being done in the realm of parasitology and the study of worms. A French physician named Nicolas Andry de Bois-Regard determined that worms were the cause of some diseases. He also declared that worms do not spontaneously form within the animal or human gut; de Bois-Regard stated that there must be some kind of 'seed' which enters the body and contains the worm in some form. Antonio Vallisneri also worked with parasitic worms, specifically members of the genera Ascaris and Neoascaris. He found that these worms came from eggs. In addition, Vallisneri worked to elucidate the reproduction of insects, specifically the sawfly.

In 1735, the first edition of Carl Linnaeus' Systema Naturae was published; this work included information on both insects and intestinal worms. However, the tenth edition is considered the true starting point for the modern classification scheme for living things today. Linnaeus' universal system of classification made a system based on binomial nomenclature, but included higher levels of classification than simply the genus and species names. Systema Naturae was an investigation into the biodiversity on Earth. However, because it was based only on very few characters, the system developed by Linnaeus was an artificial one. The book also included descriptions of the organisms named inside of it.

In 1859, Charles Darwin's On the Origin of Species was published. In this book, he described his theory of evolution by natural selection. Both the work of Darwin and his contemporary, Alfred Russel Wallace —who was also working on the theory of evolution—were informed by the careful study of insects. In addition, Darwin collected many species of invertebrate during his time aboard HMS Beagle; many of the specimens collected were insects. Using these collections, he was able to study sexual dimorphism, geographic distribution of species, and mimicry; all of these concepts influenced Darwin's theory of evolution. Unfortunately, a firm popular belief in the immutability of species was a major hurdle in the acceptance of the theory.

=== 20th century ===
Classification in the twentieth century shifted toward a focus on evolutionary relationships over morphological description. The development of phylogenetics and systematics based on this study is credited to Willi Hennig, a German entomologist. In 1966, his Phylogenetic Systematics was published; inside, Hennig redefined the goals of systematic schemes for classifying living things. He proposed that the focus be on evolutionary relationships over similar morphological features. He also defined monophyly and included his ideas about hierarchical classification. Though Hennig did not include information on outgroup comparison, he was apparently aware of the practice, which is considered important to today's systematic research.

== Notable invertebrates ==
- The Japanese spider crab (Arthropoda: Macrocheira kaempferi) is one of the world's largest arthropods. The Japanese spider crab is largest known species of crab and may live up to 100 years. With a leg span of that can reach four feet, it has the longest span of any arthropod. They are typically found in the Pacific waters near Japan on the bottom of the continental shelf.
- The lion's mane jellyfish (Cnidaria: Cyanea capillata) is the largest known type of jellyfish. Their tentacles can reach up to 190 feet long, and they may have a bell diameter of almost 7 feet. These animals are usually found in cold northern Arctic waters and in the Northern portions of the Atlantic and Pacific Oceans.
- The giant squid (Mollusca: Architeuthis dux) comes from the family Architeuthidae. These squid are both the largest known cephalopod and the largest known mollusc. They can grow to a length of about 45–50 feet long. They developed large eyes, the largest of any animal, to be able to detect small amounts of bioluminescence in the dark and deep ocean where they live.
