= Hans Lohmander =

Swedish entomologist

- Born: May 30, 1896; Helsingborg, Sweden
- Died: January 2, 1961 (aged 64); Gothenburg, Sweden
- Known for: Specialist in millipedes
- Scientific career
- Fields: entomology, arachnology
- Workplaces: Gothenburg Museum of Natural History

Hans Gustaf Lohmander (1896–1961) was a Swedish entomologist and arachnologist.

Lohmander was born May, 1896 in Helsingborg. He studied at Lund University, where he became known as an expert on several animal groups within the lower terrestrial fauna, particularly specializing in millipedes. From 1934 onwards, he worked at the Gothenburg Museum of Natural History, and headed the museum's departments of entomology and geology at the time of his death. He worked on inventory of the lower terrestrial fauna of southern Sweden through careful taxonomic and biotopological analyses. He also conducted some of his research abroad, including in the Caucasus.

In June 1924, he married Stella Lohmander (1906–1970), after whom he named the species Anthrenochernes stellae. His wife also assisted in many of Lohmander's research projects.

Lohmander died on January 2, 1961, in Gothenburg.
