= Karl Wilhelm Verhoeff =

German zoologist (1867–1945)

- Born: 25 November 1867; Soest, Westphalia
- Died: 6 December 1945 (aged 78); Munich
- Known for: Myriapod taxonomy
- Spouse: Marie Kringer
- Children: 3
- Scientific career
- Fields: Invertebrate zoology
- Workplaces: Museum für Naturkunde
- Author abbrev. (botany): Verhoeff
- Author abbrev. (zoology): Verhoeff

Karl (or Carl) Wilhelm Verhoeff (25 November 1867 – 6 December 1945) was a German myriapodologist and entomologist, specialising in myriapods (millipedes, centipedes, and related species) as well as woodlice and to a lesser extent insects.

== Biography ==
Karl W. Verhoeff was born on 25 November 1867 in Soest in Westphalia, the son of the apothecary Karl M. Verhoeff and his wife Mathilde (born Rocholl). He completed his Abitur examination in Soest in 1889 and completed his doctoral thesis in zoology in Bonn in 1893. In 1902 he married Marie Kringer, who died in 1937 during surgery. The marriage produced three children, two daughters and a son, the son dying in 1942 on the Russian front.

He was briefly employed (1900–1905) at the Museum für Naturkunde in Berlin, but for the remainder of his long career, he worked privately. Verhoeff undertook a number of collecting trips, including visits to the French Riviera, and Romania and Bulgaria down through Bosnia and into Greece. Some of these trips were financed by the Prussian Academy of Science. He financed himself partly by selling his collections, with Munich and Berlin holding large amounts of his material.

Verhoeff was one of the most prolific authors of myriapod taxa in history. He described thousands of taxa, including over a thousand species of millipede alone. Verhoeff ranks among Ralph Vary Chamberlin and Carl Attems as the three most prolific millipede taxonomists. The 1962 compilation of Gisela Mauermayer records 670 scientific works by Verhoeff, including major contributions to the series Klassen und Ordnungen des Tierreichs.

Contemporary taxonomists did not appreciate his early, groundbreaking work on Dermaptera, mainly due to his obscure expression and scarcity of illustrations and explanations, but his achievements in this group – as well as in Diplopoda and Chilognatha – were later recognized.

Verhoeff received a number of awards towards the end of his life, including the silver Leibniz Medal of the Prussian Academy of Science (1933), the Preis & Plakette of the August Forel foundation (1942) and a Doktor Diplom from the University of Bonn on the occasion of the 50th anniversary of his thesis (1943). In 1942, shortly before his 75th birthday, he was elected to the German Academy of Sciences Leopoldina. He died in Munich from suicide on 6 December 1945 (https://myriatrix.myspecies.info/users/karl-wilhelm-verhoeff).

Verhoeff's botanical writing concerned plant-insect interactions. The standard author abbreviation Verhoeff is used to indicate this person as the author when citing a botanical name.

== See also ==
- Category:Taxa named by Karl Wilhelm Verhoeff
