= Carl Attems =

Austrian myriapodologist and invertebrate zoologist

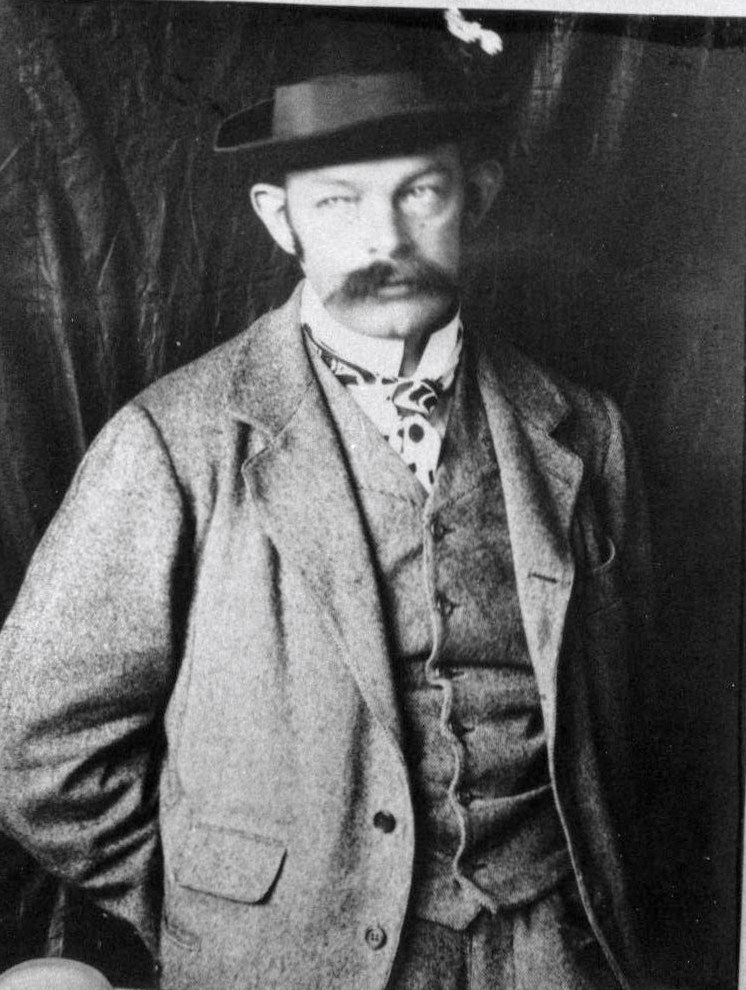
- Born: 13 October 1868; Graz, Austria
- Died: 19 April 1952 (aged 83); Vienna
- Education: University of Vienna
- Spouse: Emma von Montbach
- Scientific career
- Fields: Myriapodology, Invertebrate zoology
- Workplaces: Naturhistorisches Museum (Vienna)

Carl August Graf Attems-Petzenstein (13 October 1868 in Graz, Austria – 19 April 1952 in Vienna) was an Austrian myriapodologist and invertebrate zoologist. He published 138 scientific papers, most of them dealing with his specialist field, the myriapods. He described about 1800 new species and subspecies from all over the world.

== Life ==
Attems was born in 1868 in Graz, to the aristocratic family of Attems. He attended school in Graz, then he followed his family's wish and studied law and law history. After finishing his studies in 1891 he went to Bonn and dedicated himself to his main interest: zoology. He started his zoology studies in Germany, later moved to Vienna. Attems completed his degree with the dissertation "Die Copulationsfüße der Polydesmiden".

During his further studies he spent a lot of time examining the myriapod collection of the Viennese Hofmuseum (today's Naturhistorisches Museum). In 1898 he visited the zoological station at Naples and one year later he went to Crete. The resulting publication was named "Myriopoden von Kreta, nebst Beiträgen zur allgemeinen Kenntnis einiger Gattungen." (Myriopods of Crete, with contributions to common knowledge of some species.)

In 1905 he became an assistant in the Crustacea, Arachnoidea, and Myriapoda collection of the museum. On several excursions to Macedonia, Slovenia, and Croatia he collected myriapods, which he afterwards examined in addition to other collections from all over the world. In between Attems was appointed curator of the Evertebrata-Varia collection and spent the summer of 1911 in Roscoff, France, studying polychaetes. In the same year he married Emma von Montbach.

Befriended scientist Karl Wilhelm Verhoeff dedicated him several genus (Attemsia Verh., Attemsocyphus Verh., Attemsodesmus R. F. Lawrence).

During World War I he was called up for military service. Due to the economic crisis during the late 1920s he had to retire from any bureaucratic activity and focussed exclusively on his myriapod studies. Every day he visited the museum's collection. On 19 April 1952 Attems died on his usual way to the museum.

== Major works ==
Attems was regarded for synthesizing and generalizing existing knowledge, and making it accessible to future generations. The myriapodologist Richard L. Hoffman, writing nearly 50 years after Attems' death, recognized this skill in Attems' major monographs, most prominently in three volumes on the Polydesmidea published from 1937 to 1940, "the capstone of an illustrious lifetime of accomplishment".

- (1898) System der Polydesmiden. I. Theil. – Denkschriften der Akademie der Wissenschaften Wien, mathematisch-naturwissenschaftliche Klassen 67: 221-482.
- (1899) System der Polydesmiden. II. Theil. – Denkschriften der Akademie der Wissenschaften Wien, mathematisch-naturwissenschaftliche Klassen 68: 251-436.
- (1914) Die Indoaustralischen Myriopoden, Archiv für Naturgeschichte 80A: 1-398.
- (1914) Afrikanische Spirostreptiden nebst Überblick über die Spirostreptiden orbis terrarum. – E. Schweizerbarth'sche Verlagsbuchhandlung, Nägele & Dr. SproesserZoologica (Stuttgart) 25 (65-66): 1-235.
- (1928) The Myriopoda of South Africa. Annals of the South African Museum 26: 1-431.
- (1937) Polydesmoidea I. Fam. Strongylosomidae. – Das Tierreich. – Das Tierreich 68: 1-300.
- (1938) Polydesmoidea II. Fam. Leptodesmidae, Platyrhachidae, Oxydesmidae, Gomphodesmidae. – Das Tierreich. – Das Tierreich 69: 1-487.
- (1940) Polydesmoidea III. Fam. Polydesmidae, Vanhoeffeniidae, Cryptodesmidae, Oniscodesmidae, Sphaerotrichopidae, Periodontodesmidae, Rhachidesmidae, Macellolophidae, Pandirodesmidae. – Das Tierreich. – Das Tierreich 70: 1-577.

== Eponymous taxa ==
The following is a selection of taxa named after Carl Attems.

- Attemsia Verhoeff, 1895 (Chordeumatida, type genus of Attemsiidae)
- Attemsina Hoffman, 1963 (Polydesmida, Paradoxosomatidae; junior synonym of Trogodesmus Pocock, 1895)
- Attemsobolus Verhoeff, 1924 (Spirobolida, Spirobolellidae)
- Attemsocyphus Verhoeff, 1936 (Polydesmida, Pyrgodesmidae)
- Attemsodesmus Lawrence, 1953 (Polydesmida, Pyrgodesmidae)
- Attemsostreptus Verhoeff, 1941 (Spirostreptida, Spirostreptidae)
- Attemsotyphlus Strasser, 1962 (Julida, Julidae; junior synonym of Typhloiulus Latzel, 1884)
- Amphitomeus attemsi (Schubart, 1934) (Polydesmida, Oniscodesmidae)
