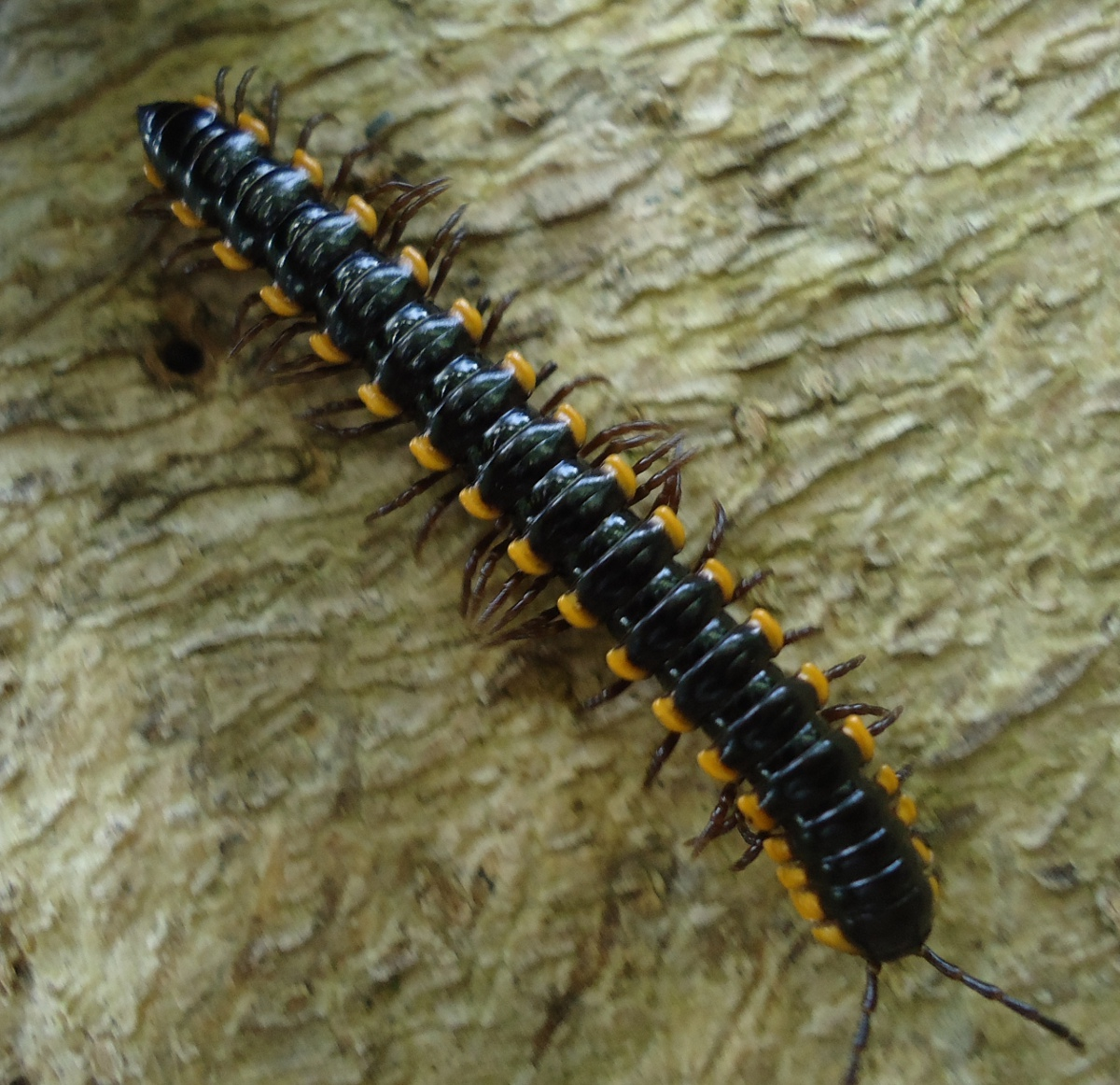
- Asiomorpha coarctata

Scientific classification
- Kingdom: Animalia
- Phylum: Arthropoda
- Subphylum: Myriapoda
- Class: Diplopoda
- Order: Polydesmida
- Suborder: Paradoxosomatidea; Daday, 1889
- Family: Paradoxosomatidae; Daday, 1889

Diversity
- c. 200 genera, 975 species

Synonyms
- Strongylosomatidae Cook, 1895

= Paradoxosomatidae =

Family of millipedes

Paradoxosomatidae, the only family in the suborder Paradoxosomatidea (also known as Strongylosomatidea), is a family of flat-backed millipedes in the order Polydesmida. Containing nearly 200 genera and 975 species as of 2013, it is one of the largest families of millipedes. Paradoxosomatids occur on all continents except Antarctica, and can generally be distinguished by dorsal grooves on most body segments and a dumb-bell shaped gonopod aperture. Notable groups within the Paradoxosomatidae include the dragon millipedes of Southeast Asia, and the widely introduced greenhouse millipede Oxidus gracilis.

== Description ==
The family is characterised by several traits. Most species possess a groove or furrow ("sulcus") on the dorsal surface between the keels (paranota) on each segment, and the keels of the second body segment are situated lower on the body than those of the first segment (collum) and third segment. In males, the opening on the underside of the body where the gonopods (male reproductive appendages) attach has a central constriction, forming the shape of an hourglass or dumb-bell. Males of most species also possess one or two projections on the sternite of the fifth body segment. Adults may have 19 or 20 body segments in addition the head, and ozopores (defensive gland openings) situated on the lateral margins of keels on (in most species) segments 5, 7, 9, 10, 12, 13, and 15 to the last segment.

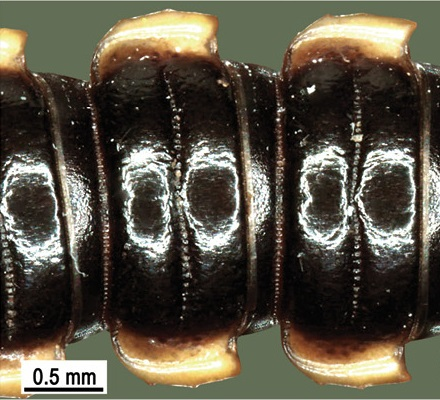
The distinctive transverse groove between keels characterizes most paradoxosomatids

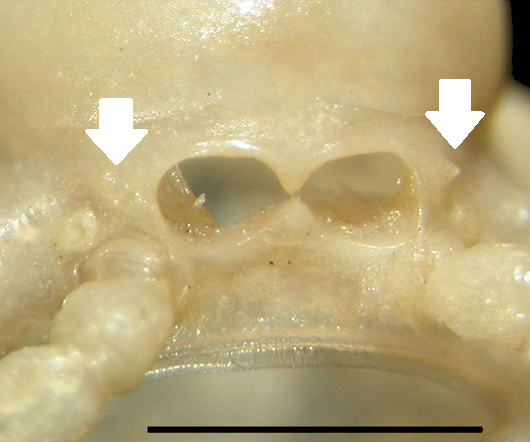
The constricted gonopod aperture (between arrows), another character of the family

== Distribution ==
Paradoxosomatids occur on every continent except Antarctica, although the only species found in North America north of Mexico are introduced. The so-called greenhouse millipede, Oxidus gracilis likely native to Japan, occurs worldwide, often associated with greenhouses or agricultural settings. Widely introduced species in the tropics include Asiomorpha coarctata (native to Southeast Asia) and Chondromorpha xanthotricha, native to Sri Lanka or southern India.

== Classification ==
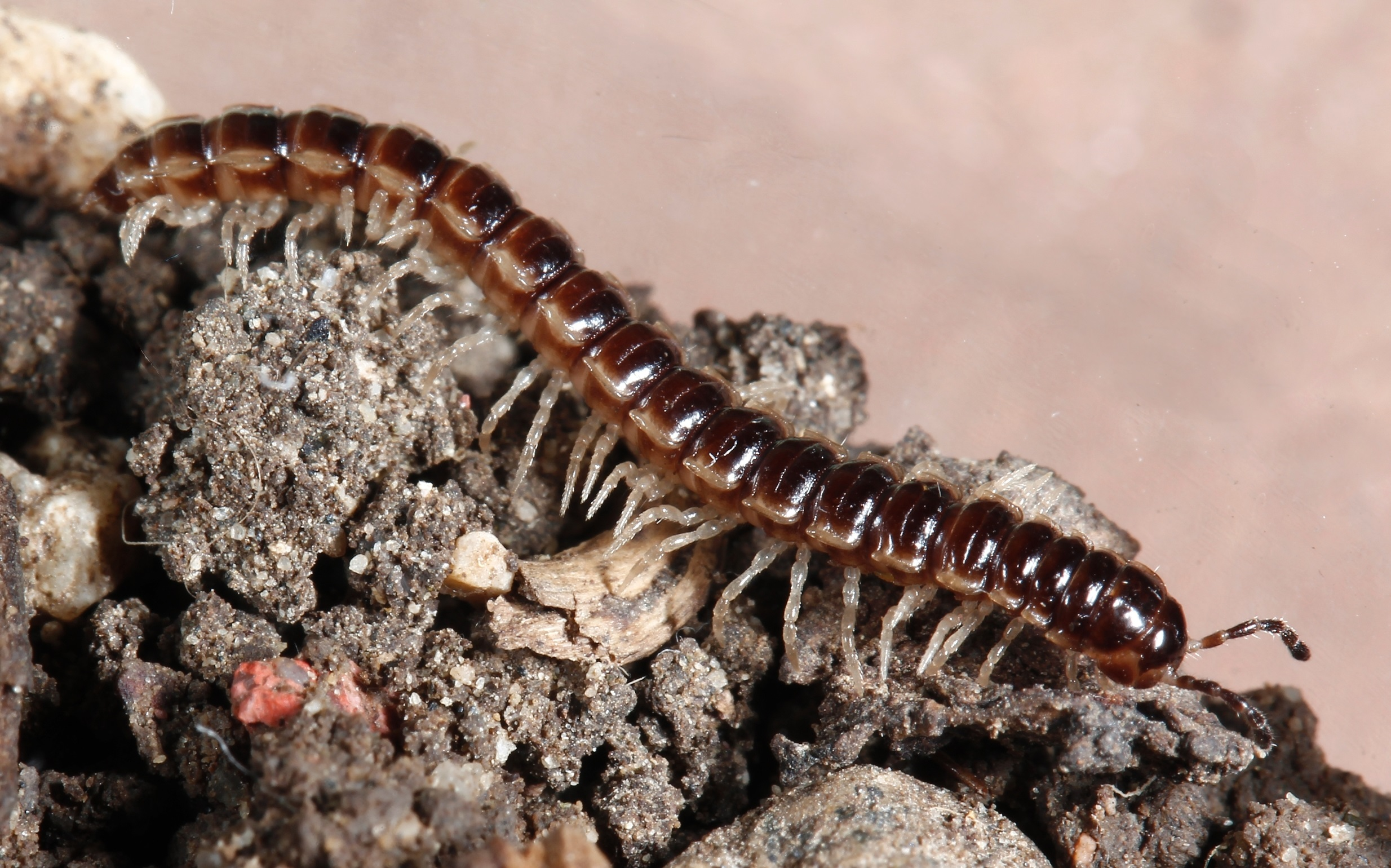
Oxidus gracilis (Paradoxosomatinae, Sulciferini)

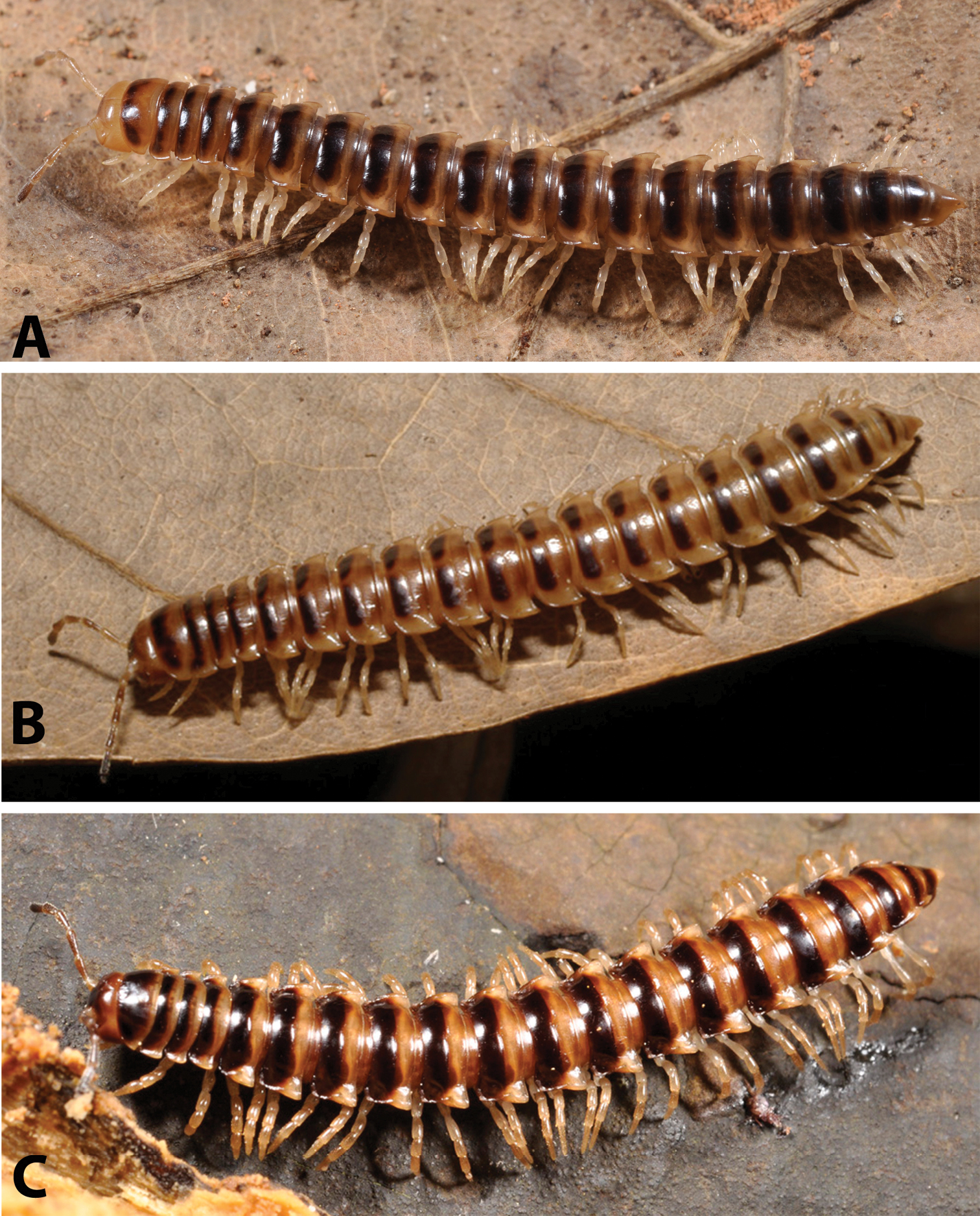
A) Riukiupeltis jamashinai, B) Chamberlinius hualienensis and C) C. uenoi (Paradoxosomatinae Chamberliniini), from Japan

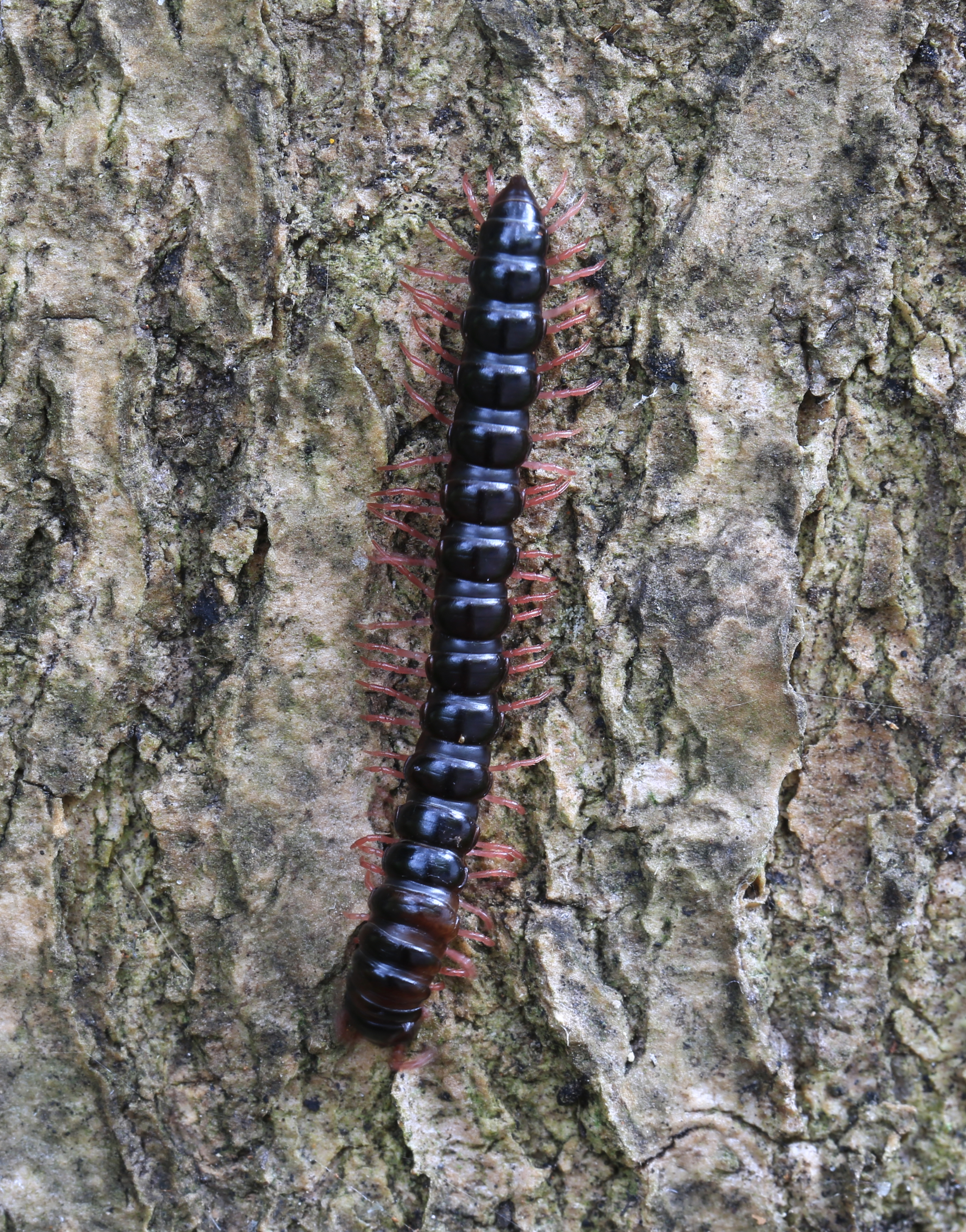
Heterocladosoma bifalcatum (Australiosomatinae, Australiosomatini)

The nearly 1000 valid species of paradoxosomatids are divided into three subfamilies and 22 tribes. Most species (over 760) belong to the subfamily Paradoxosomatinae.

Subfamily Alogolykinae - two tribes, around 60 species, central, south, and southeast Asia

- Alogolykini - Myanmar, China, Vietnam, Nepal
- Polydrepanini - Pakistan, India, Myanmar

Subfamily Australiosomatinae - three tribes, around 140 species, Southeast Asia and Oceania

- Antichiropodini - Australia, Indonesia
- Aschistodesmini - New Guinea
- Australiosomatini - Australia

Subfamily Paradoxosomatinae - 17 tribes, around 760 species, worldwide

- Catharosomatini - South America
- Centrodesmini - Indonesia
- Chamberliniini - Taiwan, Japan
- Cnemodesmini - Africa
- Eroonsomatini - Italy, Balkans
- Eustrongylosomatini - New Guinea, Philippines, Micronesia, Solomon Islands, Seychelles
- Eviulisomatini - Africa
- Graphisternini - Peru
- Nedyopodini - Taiwan, Southeast Asia
- Orthomorphini - Southeast Asia, some globally widespread
- Paradoxosomatini - Europe, middle East, Myanmar, China, India
- Sulciferini - Southeast Asia, some globally widespread species
- Sundaninini - Southeast Asia
- Tectoporini - Southeast Asia
- Tonkinosomatini - Indochina
- Xanthodesmini - Africa, Pakistan, India

== Select taxa ==
- Antichiropus
- Chamberlinius
- Desmoxytes
  - Desmoxytes purpurosea, the "shocking pink dragon millipede"
- Desmoxytoides
- Orthomorpha
