= Hylomus rhinoparvus =

Scientific classification
- Domain: Eukaryota
- Kingdom: Animalia
- Phylum: Arthropoda
- Subphylum: Myriapoda
- Class: Diplopoda
- Order: Polydesmida
- Family: Paradoxosomatidae
- Genus: Hylomus
- Species: H. rhinoparvus

Binomial name
- Hylomus rhinoparvus (Likhitrakarn, Golovatch, and Panha, 2015)

Synonyms
- Desmoxytes rhinoparva Likhitrakarn, Golovatch & Panha, 2015

Species of dragon millipede

Hylomus rhinoparvus is a species of dragon millipede in the family Paradoxosomatidae. It is only known from Houaphanh province of northeastern Laos.

It was first described, along with H. rhinoceros, in 2015. Both species were discovered in Laos, the first dragon millipedes identified there, H. rhinoparvus in the north of the country and H. rhinoceros in the south. The holotype is in the Museum of Zoology, Chulalongkorn University, Bangkok, Thailand.

The body length is 23–24 mm (0.91–0.94 in) in males and 26.5–29.5 mm (1.04–1.16 in) in females. The color is dark brown.
