= River martin =

River martins
- White-eyed river martin (Pseudochelidon sirintarae)

Scientific classification
- Kingdom: Animalia
- Phylum: Chordata
- Class: Aves
- Order: Passeriformes
- Family: Hirundinidae
- Subfamily: Pseudochelidoninae; Shelley, 1896
- Genus: Pseudochelidon; Hartlaub, 1861

Type species
- Pseudochelidon eurystomina Hartlaub, 1861

Species
- P. eurystomina P. sirintarae

Subfamily of birds

The river martins form a distinctive subfamily Pseudochelidoninae within the swallow and martin bird family Hirundinidae. The two species are the African river martin Pseudochelidon eurystomina, found in the Congo and Gabon, and the white-eyed river martin Pseudochelidon sirintarae, known only from one site in Thailand. These are medium-sized, largely black swallows that have a light buoyant flight and feed on insects caught in the air. They appear to be more terrestrial than other swallows, frequently walking rather than perching, and the white-eyed may be crepuscular. The African species excavates nest holes in sandy ridges in rivers, while the breeding locations and habits of the Asian bird are unknown.

When the African river martin was first discovered in the 19th century, Gustav Hartlaub thought it was a roller, and later authors either placed it in its own family, or with the woodswallows. Study of the anatomy revealed that the species was closest to the swallows and martins, but that it possessed a number of distinctive features, such as its robust legs and feet and stout bill. These indicated that it should be placed in a separate subfamily. The two river martin species are usually considered to belong to a single genus, Pseudochelidon, due to their having a number of structural similarities. However, Brooke proposed that the white-eyed river martin be placed in a separate monotypic genus Eurochelidon.

The African river martin has a restricted distribution; it appears to be locally numerous, although its true status has not been fully investigated. The white-eyed river martin was discovered as recently as 1969 and is only known from specimens and anecdotal evidence – no modern ornithologists have seen the species in the wild, and its breeding grounds are unknown. It may be extinct, although a possible sighting was reported in 2004.

== Taxonomy ==
When a specimen of the African river martin from Gabon was first formally described by German zoologist Gustav Hartlaub in 1861, it was not initially identified as a member of the swallow and martin family. Hartlaub placed it with the rollers, and later authors either put it in its own separate family, or with the woodswallows. It was only following study of the anatomy of the species by Lowe that it was determined to be closely related to the swallows and martins, but sufficiently different that it could be placed in a separate subfamily Pseudochelidoninae. The genus name Pseudochelidon comes from the Ancient Greek prefix ψευδο/pseudo, "false", and χελιδων/chelidôn, "swallow", reflecting its distinctiveness from the "true" swallows.

For many years the African river martin was the sole member of its genus and subfamily until the discovery of the white-eyed river martin, Pseudochelidon eurystomina, by Thai ornithologist Kitti Thonglongya in 1968. Although some authorities follow Brooke in placing that species in a separate genus Eurochelidon due to its significant differences from the African species, it remains a member of the same subfamily. Genetic studies confirmed that the two river martins form a distinct clade from the typical swallows in the Hirundininae subfamily.

The river martins are in some ways intermediate between typical swallows and other passerines: they have stout bills, large feet and relatively strong legs, which is unusual in aerial feeders. They also have a large syrinx (vocal organ) and a different bronchial structure. The extent of their differences from other swallows and the wide geographical separation of these two martins suggest that they are relict populations of a group of species that diverged from the main swallow lineage early in its evolutionary history, and they may be the most primitive of the swallows. Like other early hirundine lineages, they nest in burrows, rather than adopted nest holes or mud nests.

== Description ==
Both species are medium-sized (14–18 cm or 5.5–7.1 in), mainly black-plumaged swallows, unlikely to be confused with any other hirundine in their respective ranges. Adults of both species have large, blue-glossed heads, a green tinge to the body plumage, and brown wings. The sexes are similar in plumage. The white-eyed has elongated outer tail feathers, a whitish rump, a white eye and eye-ring, and a yellow bill. The African has a red eye-ring and bill and lacks a contrasting rump patch or tail streamers. The juveniles of both species are similar to the adults, but with brown heads, and young white-eyeds lack the long tail streamers of the adults.

The African river martin has a chee chee or cheer-cheer-cheer call when it is flying in flocks. It is very vocal during migration, giving harsh gull-like calls, and appears to have a jingling courtship song. No calls have been described for the white-eyed river martin.

== Distribution and habitat ==
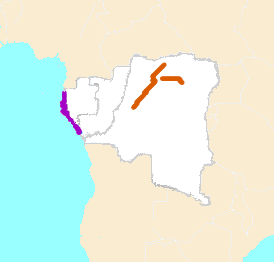
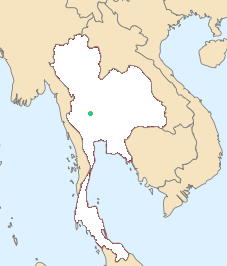
The African river martin (left map) is present all year in Gabon (purple) and the Republic of Congo (blue), and also breeds in DRC (red). The white-eyed river martin (right map) is known from one site in Thailand

The two members of the subfamily have geographically separate ranges. The African river martin breeds along the Congo and Ubangi rivers in the Democratic Republic of the Congo. It is migratory, wintering in coastal savannah in southern Gabon and the Republic of Congo; it has recently been discovered to nest in beach ridges and grassland in its coastal wintering areas. The white-eyed river martin is known only from its wintering site at Bueng Boraphet lake in Thailand, where it was seen between the months of November and February. It may be migratory, but its breeding grounds and habitat are unknown, although river valleys in Northern Thailand or south-western China are possibilities, as are Cambodia and Myanmar. However, doubts have been cast on whether it is actually migratory at all.

The African species' breeding habitat consists of forested rivers with islands with sandy shores for breeding. The nesting grounds of the white-eyed river martin are unknown, but if the breeding habitat resembles that of its relative, it is likely to be the forested valleys of large rivers, which can provide sandbars and islands for nesting, and woodland over which the birds can catch insect prey. The African river martin uses coastal savannah as its winter habitat. Based on its only known wintering site, the non-breeding habitat of the white-eyed is assumed to be in the vicinity of open fresh water for feeding, with reed-beds for the night-time roost.

== Behaviour ==
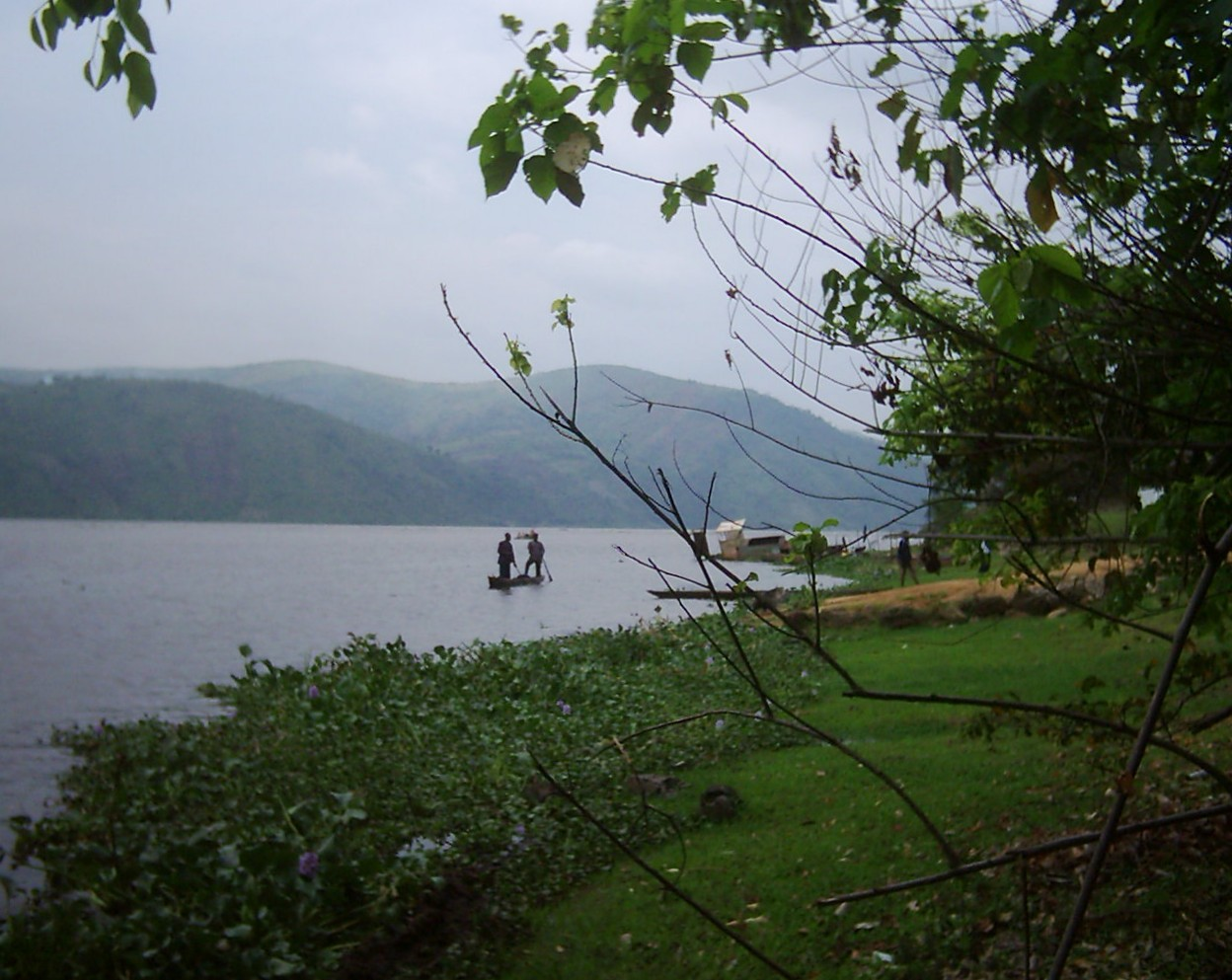
The Congo River is a major breeding area of the African river martin

Breeding behaviour is known only for the African river martin. It nests in large colonies of up to 800 birds from December to April, when the river levels are low. Each pair excavates a 1–2 m (39–79 in) long tunnel in the exposed sandbanks. The pocket at the end of the tunnel has a few twigs and leaves to serve as a nest, onto which two to four unspotted white eggs are laid. It has chasing flight displays and will walk on the ground; it also displays on the ground, but the function of this is uncertain. It rarely perches during the breeding season. Although it has been assumed that the breeding habits of the white-eyed species resemble those of the African species, distinctive differences in foot and toe morphology suggest that it might not use a burrow for nesting.

The African river martin feeds in flocks over river and forest, often far from water. It eats insects, mainly taking winged ants. The flight is strong and fast, interspersed with glides. Wintering birds regularly perch on treetops, wires and roofs. The white-eyed river martin feeds on insects, including beetles, which are caught on the wing. Given its size and unusual mouth structure, it may take larger insects than other swallows. This species is described as graceful and buoyant in flight, and, like its African relative, appears reluctant to use perches. This behaviour, together with its unusual toe-shape and the fact that mud was found on the toes of one of the first specimens, suggests that this species may be relatively terrestrial. In winter, it roosts with barn swallows in reedbeds. Pamela C. Rasmussen suggested that, given its unusually large eyes, the species might be nocturnal or crepuscular, a factor that could make it highly cryptic and thus partly explain how such a distinctive species remained undetected for so long. Although the fact that the first specimens were supposedly collected roosting at night in reed-beds might be a contraindication, it is possible that the birds might not actually have been caught at the roost; or they might be crepuscular, feeding at dawn and dusk; or they might be capable of both diurnal and nocturnal behaviour, depending on the season or local circumstances.

== Status ==
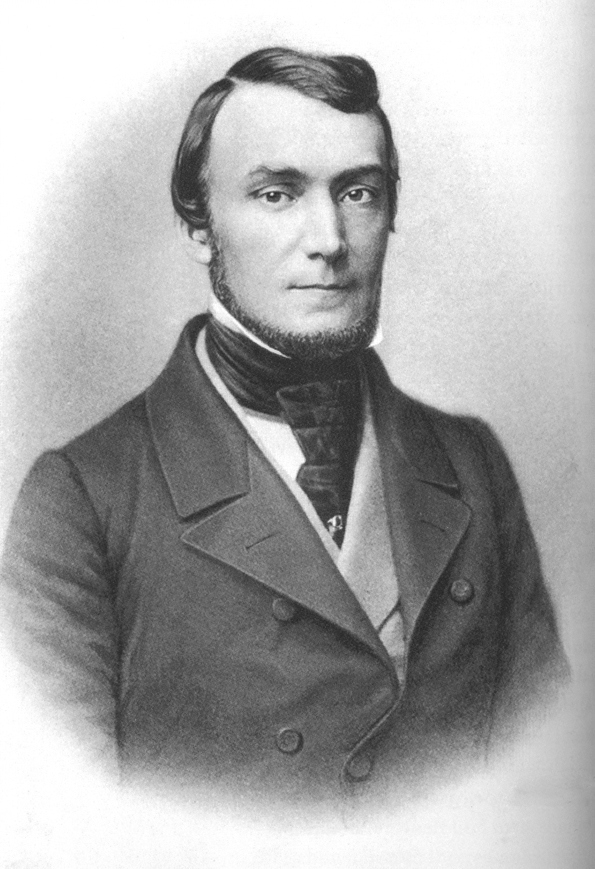
Gustav Hartlaub described the African river martin

The white-eyed river martin was seen in Thailand in 1972, 1977 and 1980, but not definitely since. There are unconfirmed sightings from Thailand in 1986 and Cambodia in 2004. It is classified as critically endangered by the International Union for the Conservation of Nature and Natural Resources (IUCN). This designation means that a species' numbers have decreased, or will decrease, by 80% within three generations. This species may be extinct, but the IUCN will not categorise it as such until extensive targeted surveys have been conducted. Despite legal protection under Appendix 1 of the Convention on International Trade in Endangered Species of Wild Fauna and Flora (CITES) agreement, it was captured by locals along with other swallows for sale as food or for release by devout Buddhists. Following its discovery by ornithologists, trappers were reported to have caught as many as 120 and sold them to the director of the Nakhon Sawan Fisheries Station who was unable to keep them alive in captivity. The small population may therefore have become non-viable.

One factor that reduces the chances of re-discovering the white-eyed martin is the drastic decline in the numbers of swallows wintering at Bueng Boraphet, its only known site, from the hundreds of thousands reported around 1970 to maximum counts of 8,000 made in the winter of 1980–1981. It is not certain whether this represents a real decline or a shift in site in response to persecution. Other potential causes for the species' decline include the disturbance of riverine sand bars, the construction of dams which flood the area upstream and alter the downstream hydrology, deforestation, and increasing conversion of its habitat to agriculture. Very few swallows now roost in the Bueng Boraphet reedbeds, preferring sugarcane plantations, and, despite searching, the white-eyed river martin has not been found in other nearby large swallow roosts. Bueng Boraphet has been declared a non-hunting area in an effort to protect the species, but surveys to find this martin have been unsuccessful. Past surveys include several at Bueng Boraphet, a 1969 survey of the Nan Yom and Wang Rivers of northern Thailand, and a 1996 survey of rivers in northern Laos. A possible unverified sighting was reported in 2004.

The total population size of the African river martin is unknown. In the late 1980s, it appeared to be common, if local, and large numbers were seen on migration in Gabon. However, it is particularly poorly known in the Democratic Republic of the Congo (DRC), and it is unclear if there is any relationship between the birds breeding in the DRC and those breeding in coastal areas of Gabon and the Republic of Congo. A flock of 15,000 birds was seen in 1997, and a mixed flock with rosy bee-eater Merops malimbicus was estimated at 100,000 birds; nevertheless, due to the lack of detailed information, the species is classed by the IUCN as Data Deficient. In the 1950s, the species was caught and eaten in large quantities in the DRC by the local population, and this practice could be increasing. Breeding colonies in river sandbars are also liable to flooding, but thousands of birds were breeding on the grasslands east of Gamba as recently as 2005.
