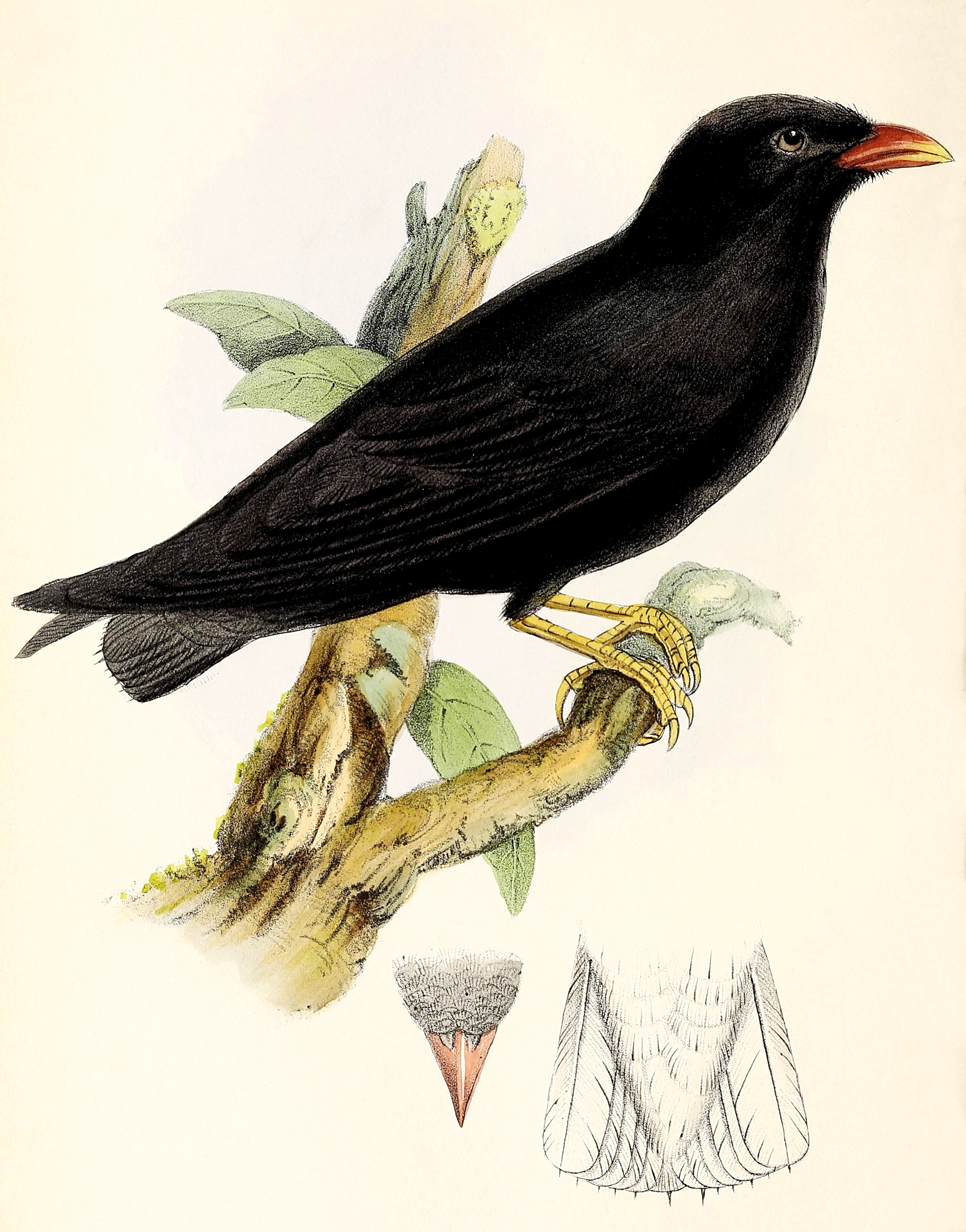

Conservation status
- Least Concern (IUCN 3.1)

Scientific classification
- Kingdom: Animalia
- Phylum: Chordata
- Class: Aves
- Order: Passeriformes
- Family: Hirundinidae
- Genus: Pseudochelidon
- Species: P. eurystomina

Binomial name
- Pseudochelidon eurystomina Hartlaub, 1861; Holotype from Gabon
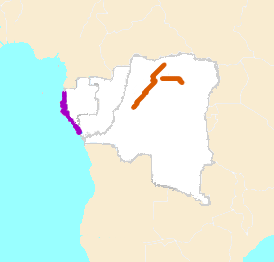
- Breeding range in DRC; Present all year in Gabon and Republic of the Congo (ranges are very approximate)

= African river martin =

Migratory passerine bird of the swallow family

The African river martin (Pseudochelidon eurystomina) is a passerine bird, one of two members of the river martin subfamily of the swallow family, Hirundinidae. When discovered, it was not initially recognised as a swallow, and its structural differences from most of its relatives, including its stout bill and robust legs and feet, have led to its current placement in a separate subfamily shared only with the Asian white-eyed river martin. The African river martin is a large swallow, mainly black with a blue-green gloss to the head and a greener tint to the back and wings. The under-wings are brownish, the underparts are purple-black, and the flight feathers are black. This martin has red eyes, a broad orange-red bill and a black, square tail. Young birds are similar in appearance to the adults, but have browner plumage. This species has a variety of unmusical calls, and displays both in flight and on the ground, although the purpose of the terrestrial display is unknown.

The main breeding areas are in the Democratic Republic of the Congo (DRC) along the Congo River and its tributary, the Ubangi, in habitats characterised by a mixture of tropical forest types including swampy or seasonally flooded woodland. The African river martin is migratory, wintering in coastal savanna in southern Gabon and the Republic of the Congo. Breeding also occurs in these coastal areas, but it is unknown whether the migrants are raising a second brood or if there is a separate resident population. This martin feeds in flocks throughout the year, catching a variety of insects in the air, especially flying ants. It does not use perches during the breeding season, although it will often land on the ground.

The African river martin nests in burrows in river sand banks, often alongside rosy bee-eaters, but its incubation and fledging times are not known. It also digs tunnels for night-time shelter when in its wintering areas. It appears to be common within its restricted range, despite being caught in large numbers by the local population for food, and large flocks are sometimes seen. However, due to a lack of detailed information about its breeding range and population numbers, this species is classed as Data Deficient by the International Union for Conservation of Nature (IUCN).

== Taxonomy ==
When German zoologist Gustav Hartlaub first described the African river martin in 1861, it was not initially thought to be a member of the swallow and martin family, and he placed it with the rollers. Later authors either placed it in its own monotypic family, or with the woodswallows. A 1938 study of this martin's anatomy by Percy Lowe revealed that the species was closest to the swallows and martins, but sufficiently distinct from them to be placed in a separate subfamily, Pseudochelidoninae.

The only other member of the subfamily is the white-eyed river martin Pseudochelidon sirintarae, known only from one site in Thailand and possibly extinct. These two species possess a number of features which distinguish them from other swallows and martins, including their robust legs and feet, stout bills, large syrinxes (vocal organs) and different bronchial structure. Genetic studies confirmed that the two river martins form a distinct clade from the typical swallows in the subfamily Hirundininae.

The two river martins are in some ways intermediate between typical swallows and other passerine birds, and the arrangement of their leg muscles is more like that of a typical passerine than of a swallow. The extent of their differences from other swallows and the wide geographical separation of these two martins suggest that they are relict populations of a group of species that diverged from the main swallow lineage early in its evolutionary history. Like other early hirundine lineages, these martins nest in self-excavated burrows, rather than adopted nest holes or mud nests. Their physical characteristics and breeding behaviour suggest that they may be the most primitive of the swallows.

The genus name Pseudochelidon (Hartlaub, 1861) comes from the Ancient Greek language prefix ψευδο/pseudo, meaning "false", and χελιδον/chelidôn, meaning "swallow". The species name reflects the superficial similarity to the rollers of the genus Eurystomus.

The African and Asian Pseudochelidon species differ markedly in the size of their bills and eyes, suggesting that they have different feeding ecologies, with the white-eyed river martin probably able to take much larger prey. The African species has a softer, fleshier, and much less prominent gape (fleshy interior of the bill) than its Thai relative. The bill of the white-eyed river martin also averages 22.5% wider than that of the African river martin. Following a suggestion by the Thai bird's discoverer, Kitti Thonglongya, Richard Brooke proposed in 1972 that the white-eyed river martin was sufficiently different from the African species to be placed in a separate genus Eurochelidon, leaving the African river martin in a monotypic genus. This treatment was contested by other authorities, and most authors retain the two species in Pseudochelidon, BirdLife International being a notable exception.

== Description ==
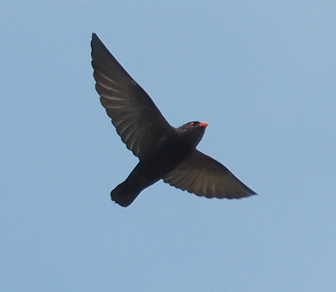
In flight

The adult African river martin is a large swallow, 14 cm (5.5 in) long. It is mainly black, with a silky blue-green gloss to the head, becoming distinctly green on the back and wing coverts. The underparts, other than the brownish under-wings, are purple-black, and the flight feathers are black. The black square tail is 4.8 cm (1.9 in) long, and the soft feather shafts project beyond the barbed section. This feature is most pronounced in the two central feathers, which in the related white-eyed river martin are greatly elongated. The African river martin has brown legs with a 1.5 cm (0.59 in) long tarsus, red eyes, pink eye-rings, and a broad orange-red bill. The wing length averages 14 cm (5.5 in).

The sexes are similar in appearance. There are many bird species in which there is sexual dichromatism that is not apparent to the human eye, but spectroscopic analysis of this martin's head feathers suggests that the colour differences between the sexes are small even to the birds' perception. Juveniles are duller and have sooty brown heads. The moult to adult plumage takes place in the wintering areas and is largely complete by October.

The African river martin has a strong, fast flight interspersed with glides. It is a vocal species with a variety of sounds. It has a jingling song given in the aerial breeding display, and a number of contact calls, kee-r-r, chee-chee and similar short, unmusical sounds. Flocks call together, cheer-cheer-cheer, as they take to the air, and this martin is very vocal during migration, giving harsh gull-like calls.

== Distribution and habitat ==
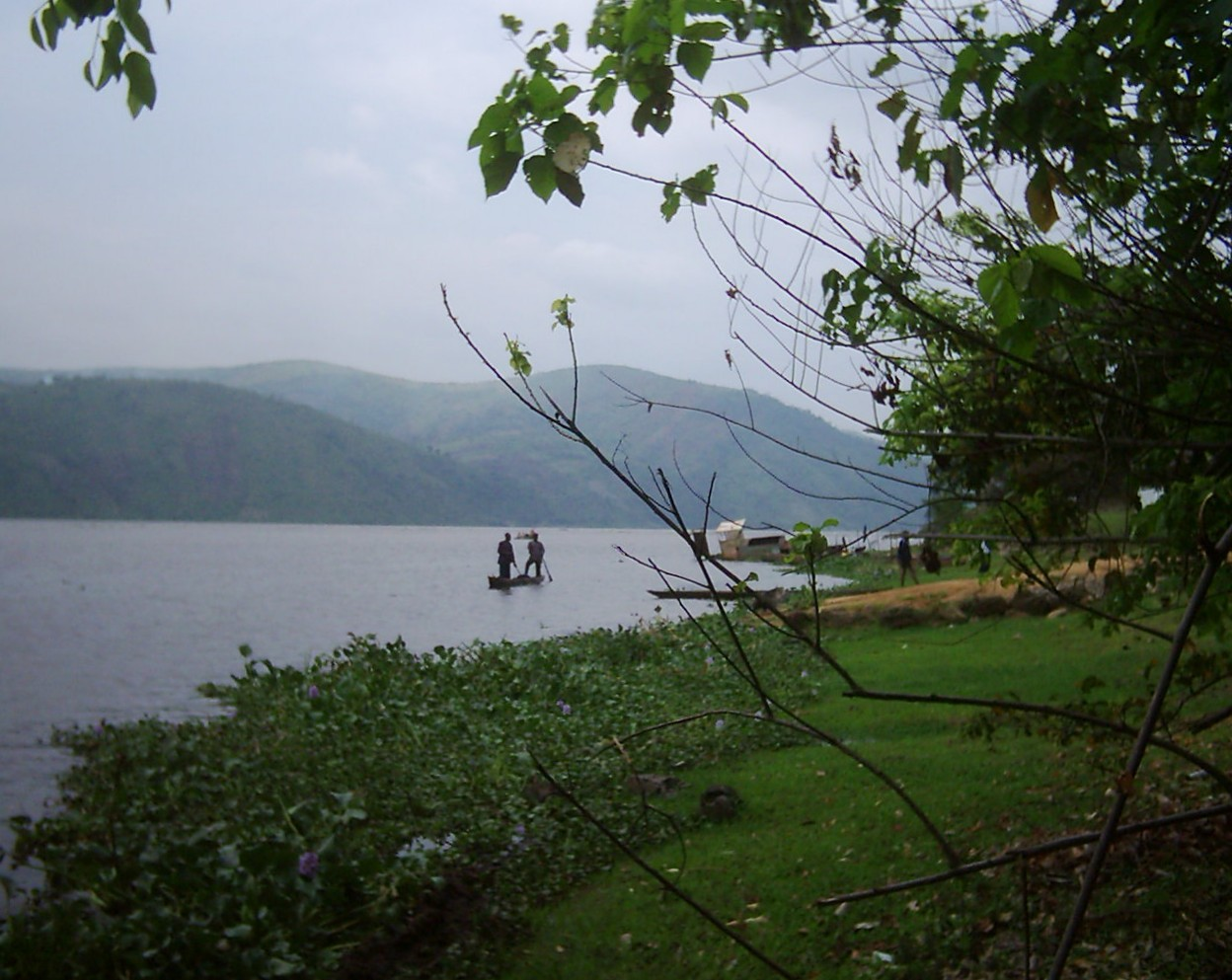
Congo River near Maluku

The African river martin breeds along the Congo River and its tributary, the Ubangi in the Democratic Republic of the Congo (DRC), an area estimated at 47,000 km^{2} (18,150 mi^{2}). This part of Africa is poorly known, and this martin may also breed on other tributaries, such as the Kasai, or on other suitable rivers. It also breeds in southern Gabon and the Republic of the Congo. The DRC breeding population is migratory, wintering in coastal savanna in Gabon, but it is not known if the birds nesting at the coast are a separate population, or if the migrants are breeding again in the wintering area. Westwards migration from the DRC is from June to early September, with birds arriving at the coast from mid-August to mid-September. Return migration is mainly from December to March. Three or four birds were seen passing through the southern Central African Republic in 1994.

This martin's breeding requirement is forested rivers with islands that have sandy banks for nest burrows, and its habitat in the DRC is tropical forest with over 200 cm (78.5 in) of rain a year. This area is a patchwork of dry, seasonally flooded and permanently wet woodland, and seasonally flooded savanna, all of which are subject to inundation by the Congo River and its tributaries. The swamp forests contain trees such as Symphonia globulifera, raffia palms and Mitragyna species, and the riverbanks are often lined with arrowroot. This specialised habitat is shared with two other restricted-range birds, the Congo sunbird and the Congo martin. The main coastal breeding area in Gabon, around Gamba, has a similar mosaic of habitats, with mangroves, swamp forests, wet evergreen woodlands and seasonally wet savanna. There are also two large lagoons, and drier areas of grassland and forest. All the breeding areas form part of a belt of forest that stretches from southern Cameroon through Gabon to the northern parts of the Republic of Congo, and extends through most of the DRC up to its eastern mountains. Outside of the breeding season, this martin roosts in reed-beds or riverine vegetation.

== Behaviour ==
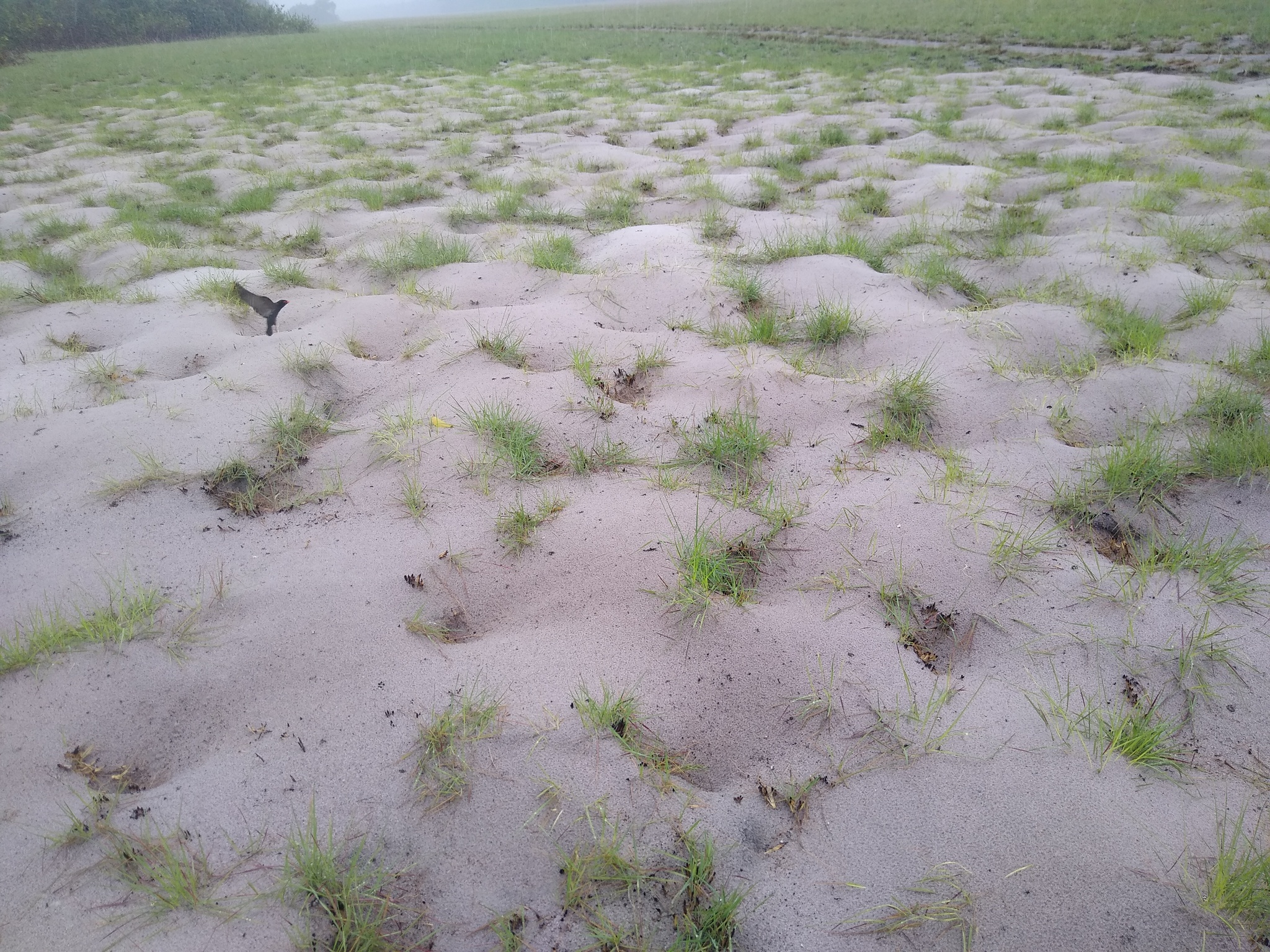
Breeding colony in Gabon

The African river martin has flight displays in which pairs or small groups chase each other while making jingling calls. It also displays on the ground, with the wings drooped and slightly open, and the head raised but held horizontally; the function of these terrestrial displays is uncertain. This species nests in colonies in sandbanks along forested rivers from December to April when the river is low. The colonies, sometimes shared with rosy bee-eaters in Gabon, may contain up to 800 birds, each pair excavating a 1–2 m (39–79 in) long tunnel in the sandbar. Two to four unspotted white eggs are laid onto a few twigs and leaves in the pocket at the end of the tunnel. The eggs measure 21.9 mm–26.0 mm × 16.4 mm–18.2 mm (0.86 in–1.02 in × 0.65 in–0.72 in). The incubation and fledging times are unknown, although it is believed that both parents care for the nestlings.

In the breeding areas, this martin rarely uses perches other than the ground, and once it has landed, it may walk around or cleanse itself with the sand. It feeds in flocks often far from the colony. Wintering birds use elevated perches much more readily, landing on treetops, wires and roofs, and feed in flight over rivers and forests, often far from water. The flocks feed on insects including flies, small beetles and bugs, but mainly on winged ants. Wintering birds dig tunnels in the sand in which to roost overnight.

== Status ==
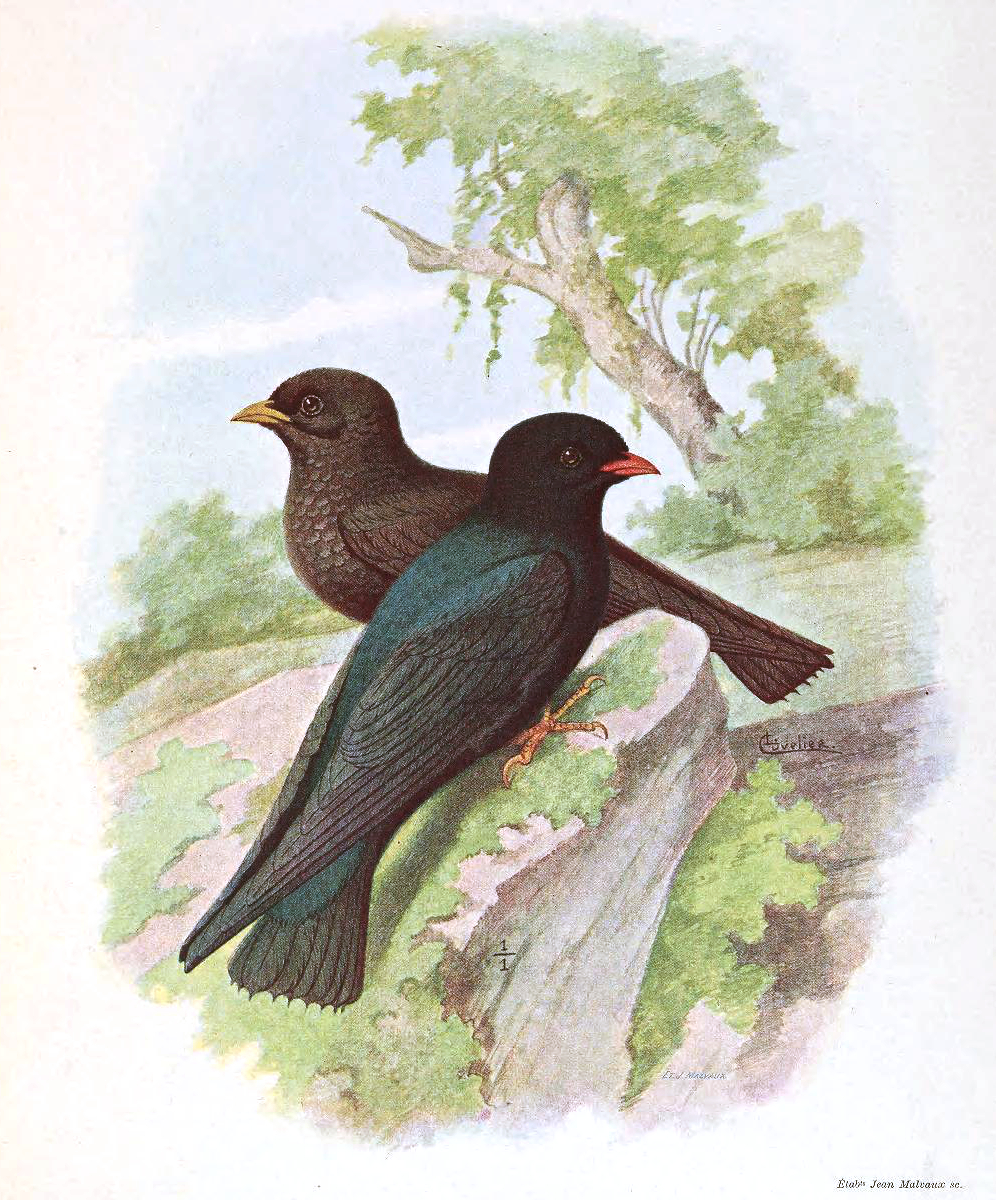
Adult (foreground) and juvenile

The total population size of the African river martin is unknown. In the late 1980s, it appeared to be common, if local, and large numbers were seen on migration in Gabon. However, it is particularly poorly studied in the Democratic Republic of the Congo (DRC), and it is not known if there is any relationship between the birds breeding in the DRC and those breeding in coastal areas of Gabon and Congo. Several hundred birds were seen at Conkouati-Douli National Park in Congo in 1996 and a flock of 15,000 birds was seen in Gabon in 1997. Investigations in Gabon in September 2003 extended the known range of this martin. More than 300 birds were found with hundreds of rosy bee-eaters in the Omboué area and the newly established Iguéla National Park, and a mixed flock with rosy bee-eaters at Loango National Park in Gabon was estimated at 100,000 birds in total. In January 2010, 250 martins were seen at a new location in Bakoumba, and single birds were observed in hirundine flocks near Moanda, at Mounana, and at Lekoni. The species is classed by the IUCN as Least Concern given its large range.

This species is protected under national laws in the DRC (Loi portant réglémentation de la chasses, 1985), and Gabon (Loi d'orientation en matière des eaux et forêts, 1982 and Loi relative à la protection et à l'amélioration de l'environnement, 1993), and by regional legislation in Nigeria, which does not have national wildlife laws. The Nigerian laws are based directly on older colonial era laws which include a number of species, such as this martin, which are not native to the country. The African river martin is not a protected species in the Republic of Congo.

In the 1950s, this martin was caught and eaten in large quantities in the DRC by the local population, and this practice could be increasing. The African river martins and the bee-eaters with which they share their colonies are dug out of the breeding burrows for food. Breeding colonies in river sandbars are liable to flooding, but thousands of birds were breeding on the grasslands east of Gamba as recently as 2005.

== Cited texts ==
- Collar, N J; Andreev, A V; Chan, S; Crosby, M J.; Subramanya, S; Tobias, J A, eds. (2001). Threatened Birds of Asia; The BirdLife International Red Data Book. BirdLife International. ISBN 0-946888-44-2.
- Fishpool, D C; Evans, Michael I, eds. (2001). Important Bird Areas in Africa and Associated Islands: Priority Sites for Conservation. BirdLife International. ISBN 1-874357-20-X.
- IUCN (1986). African Wildlife Laws. IUCN. ISBN 2-88032-091-7.
- Turner, Angela K; Rose, Chris (1989). A Handbook to the Swallows and Martins of the World. Helm Identification Guides. Christopher Helm. ISBN 0-7470-3202-5.
- Wilks, Chris (1990). La conservation des ecosystèmes forestiers du Gabon (in French). IUCN. ISBN 2-88032-988-4.
