= Hylomus rhinoceros =

Scientific classification
- Domain: Eukaryota
- Kingdom: Animalia
- Phylum: Arthropoda
- Subphylum: Myriapoda
- Class: Diplopoda
- Order: Polydesmida
- Family: Paradoxosomatidae
- Genus: Hylomus
- Species: H. rhinoceros

Binomial name
- Hylomus rhinoceros (Likhitrakarn, Golovatch & Panha, 2015)

Synonyms
- Desmoxytes rhinoceros Likhitrakarn, Golovatch & Panha, 2015

Species of millipede

Hylomus rhinoceros is an aposematic species of dragon millipede in the family Paradoxosomatidae. It is only known from Champasak and Sekong Provinces in southern Laos.

It was first described, along with H. rhinoparvus, in 2015. Both species were discovered in Laos, the first dragon millipedes identified there, H. rhinoceros in the south of the country and H. rhinoparvus in the north. The holotype is in the Museum of Zoology, Chulalongkorn University, Bangkok, Thailand.

The body length is 17–24 mm (0.67–0.94 in) in males and 20–25 mm (0.79–0.98 in) in females. The color is dark red.
