= Phu Khiao Wildlife Breeding Center =

Coordinates: 16.4931098°N 101.7156942°E

Phu Khiao Wildlife Breeding Center is one of the 23 wildlife breeding stations in Thailand maintained by the Department of National Parks, Wildlife and Plant Conservation.

== History and mission ==
It opened in 1984 on an area of approximately 166 acres and houses more than 1,000 animals, both indigenous species and exotic species.

Its main duty is to breed, propagate and increase the population of wildlife in the Phu Khiao Wildlife Sanctuary and nearby conservation areas. It also shared wildlife with other forestlands that used to have the same type of wildlife. It breeds reserved wildlife, especially pheasants, such as silver pheasants, Siamese firebacks, green peafowl and Indian peafowl. After breeding, the station releases the birds into the wild at Thung Kamang, a main grassland of the Phu Khiao Wildlife Sanctuary.

In addition, it has a duty to look after wildlife that were stolen and wildlife that caused problems to the community. Another duty it serves is to act like a lost animal shelter for species such as monkeys and gibbons, and even stolen carnivores, such as tigers, leopards and wild cats. Since these animals were once exotic pets, when they grew too big, the owners could not afford to care for them anymore, and fearing that they would be breaking the law, they released the animals into the wild or into the community. In the case of the communities, they caused trouble for residents. Moreover, these animals cannot survive in the wild, because some of them have lost their hunting instincts vital for them to survive in the wild.

The station is sectioned as some zones are open to public. Tourists and students who like to learn about wildlife are welcome.

Although it was developed into a zoo, it has a broader goal, which is to be a learning center for the public to be aware and see the importance of wildlife and know that wildlife trade is illegal.

== Location ==
The station is located in Thung Lui Lai subdistrict, Khon San district, Chaiyaphum province. Admission is free.

== List of animals exhibited and bred ==
- White-handed gibbon
- Squirrel monkey
- Silver pheasant
- Siamese fireback
- Green peacock
- Indian peacock
- Golden pheasant
- Lady Amherst's pheasant
- Great hornbill
- Oriental pied hornbill
- Siamese crocodile
- Freshwater turtle
- Burmese python
- Reticulated python
- Tiger
- Leopard
- Leopard cat
- Sambar deer
- Common muntjac
- Indian hog deer
- Mainland serow
- Owl
- Crested serpent-eagle
- Crested goshawk
- Black kite
- Brahminy kite

== See more ==
- List of protected areas of Thailand
- Reserved wild animals of Thailand
