= Elliott McClure =

Howe Elliott McClure (April 29, 1910, Chicago-December 27, 1998, Camarillo, California) was an American entomologist, ornithologist and epidemiologist who worked on bird transmitted diseases in Asia, especially in Japan, Thailand and Malaya working on a number of diseases associated with birds including Japanese encephalitis.

== Life and work ==
McClure was born in Chicago, Illinois and was the only child of Howe Alexander, a travelling salesman for a food company and Clara Phillips McClure, a gifted pianist. His early schooling was in a number of places including Lewisville, Texas where his mother moved after her divorce. He took an early interest in insects and read all the works of Jean Henri Fabre while still in his teens. He studied in Seattle, Washington; Lewisville, Texas; and Danville, Illinois (where his father lived with his step-mother).

His masters work was in entomology at the University of Illinois at Urbana-Champaign where he studied under Clell Lee Metcalf. Apart from his regular research he conducted several unusual studies such as a 24-hour watch over a Tetraopes tetraopthalmus beetle, observing all the other insects that approached it and their interactions. He also studied ecology under Victor Ernest Shelford and graduated in June 1933 with high honors, Phi Beta Kappa. On 1 October 1933, he married Lucy Esther Lou Fairchild who he had known from childhood. Metcalf wrote to him that if he did not get a job, he should come back to school for another degree. This he did and was taken on by Metcalf but refused by W.P. Flint. For his master's degree he studied aerial insects. He then worked on a Ph.D. in wildlife management at Iowa State University with studies on the mourning dove. He also conducted studies on road-kills in Nebraska. He started bird banding in 1938 and personally banded close to 100,000 birds of 550 species by the end of his life, and may possibly hold the record for number of species ringed.

After World War II, when McClure served in the U.S. Navy, he was hired by the State of California to study an outbreak of encephalitis in horses in Bakersfield. As a result of this work, Walter Reed Institutes of Research sent him on a mission to Japan in 1950. McClure went to Japan to study arthropod borne diseases. This work was supported by the US Army, 406 Medical General Laboratory. The work involved collecting bird blood samples for testing viruses. Here McClure discovered that birds that were shot showed blood that appeared to be positive for viruses while those samples examined from blood drawn from mist-netted (mist nets were a Japanese innovation) specimens appeared to be negative. This demonstrated methodological errors and from then on all samples were collected only from traps.

In 1958 McLure moved to Japan where he worked as an ornithologist for the US Army Medical Research Unit. This led in 1963 to a major project to study migratory birds in Asia with funding by the Southeast Asia Treaty Organization (SEATO). This was called the "Migratory Animal Pathological Survey" (MAPS) and it went on for 8 years and in 18 countries, including Thailand and Japan. This was continued until his retirement in 1975. The program banded 1,165,288 birds of 1,218 species of which 5,601 individuals of 235 species were recovered. Oliver L. Austin (Auk 92:626) favorably reviewed McClure's "amazingly productive" 478-page report, Migration and Survival of the Birds of Asia (U.S. Army component, SEATO, 1974). Lord Medway in his review (Ibis 117: 119–120) said

Thanks to Dr. McClure, training and experience in ringing has been obtained by a generation of biologists in eastern Asia, amateur and professional. From these men, in due course, activity may resurge.

McClure studied a number of aspects of ornithology in southeast Asia including mixed-species flocks. During his work in Thailand, he took the only known colour photos from a living individual of the now probably extinct white-eyed river martin (Pseudochelidon sirintarae, Thai: Nok Ta Phong; from 1968 Nok Chaofa Ying Sirinthon). This (until 1968 as Nok Ta Phong only locally known) bird was officially discovered 1968 and has never been confirmed again after 1978.

After retirement, McClure went back to Camarillo, California, teaching non-credit classes at Moorpark and Ventura community colleges, lecturing to various groups, and continuing to band birds. His publications included more than 150 articles and eight books, including Bird Banding (1984) and Whistling Wings (1991). The initial drawings of mourning doves were made by Kathleen Clement and along with his archive these are located in the Cornell University Library Archives. After the death of Lucy on 13 October 1991 he travelled again in 1992 to Thailand to attend the international workshop on Asian hornbills. He travelled to Thailand again in 1993 and visited Japan. He also wrote an autobiography Stories I Like to Tell: An Autobiography (published privately in 1995), which included many photographs of his family and collaborators.

His association with the US Army led to his being disallowed into China and the USSR during the cold war years. Handbills were circulated in Tokyo in 1950 describing the work as being on biological warfare. McClure described the rumours that they "... were supposed to be inoculating birds with viruses and freeing them to take infection to China and other lands."

A species of blood parasite from Zoothera marginata, Leucocytozoon mccluri is named after him. McClure also collected insects from Southeast Asia during the course of the pathology surveys and Telmatoscopus mcclurei, fly from the Batu cave; Aderus mcclurei, a beetle; an erotylid beetle, Triplax mcclurei; and a Milichid fly, Leptometopa mcclurei are named after him.

McClure became a member of the American Ornithologists' Union in 1942, an elective member in 1973 and a fellow in 1990.

== Legacy ==
The Conejo Valley Botanic Garden along with the Conejo Valley Chapter of the Audubon Society has dedicated a trail to him by naming it The Elliott McClure Birding Trail.
