= Desmoxytoides =

Desmoxytoides hasenpuschorum

Scientific classification
- Kingdom: Animalia
- Phylum: Arthropoda
- Subphylum: Myriapoda
- Class: Diplopoda
- Order: Polydesmida
- Family: Paradoxosomatidae
- Genus: Desmoxytoides; Mesibov, 2006
- Species: D. hasenpuschorum

Binomial name
- Desmoxytoides hasenpuschorum Mesibov, 2006

Genus of millipedes

Desmoxytoides hasenpuschorum is a species of millipede and the only species in the monotypic genus Desmoxytoides. It lives in Australia. This species is closely related to the dragon millipedes of the genus Desmoxytes, and there is some speculation, even by Robert Mesibov, the genus authority, that the split may not be necessary. While Desmoxytoides hasenpuschorum is similar to the millipedes of Desmoxytes in paranotal form and metatergite sculpture, it has a simpler gonopod telopodite with an unprotected solenomere which gives it its own monotypic genus. This species has the ability to produce hydrogen cyanide to ward off predators.
