= Hup Pa Tat =

Valley in Thailand

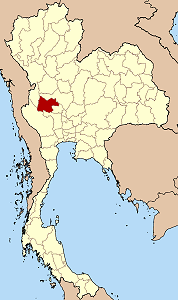
Uthai Thani Province

Hup Pa Tat (Thai: หุบป่าตาด, pronounced [hùp pàː tàːt]) is a valley located in Uthai Thani Province in Thailand. There is an abundance of exotic plants, such as Arenga Pinnata. The plants expand wildly in the cordon of stalagmites and stalactites. During the visits, rare animals like elongated tortoises and pink dragon millipede might be found. The valley is located in Kao Huai Sok, one of the mountains in a limestone mountain range, comprising an area of about 48,000 square meters. A long time ago, this was an enormous cave until the ceiling collapsed. Major limestone blocks scattered on the floor of the valley confirm this theory. Surrounding by limestone mountains, the sunlight is restrained from reaching the ground during any time than midday. The place was discovered by a local monk in 1979. Later in 1984, the mountain has been blasted to make convenient access to the valley.

== History ==
The cave was discovered in 1979 by Suntitumgosol, a local monk at Tham Thong Temple. At that time, he climbed down the cliff and found that there are many Arenga pinnata grow in that area. Which the Arenga pinnata is categorized as an ancient tree in the same family as palm trees. He has dug off and blasted an opening in 1984. In the same year, this place has become a conservation area to develop it in the future as an ecotourism place. The Department of National Parks, Wildlife and Plant Conservation recognized the uniqueness and importance of the valley and took place under its custody to make it well preserved.

== Geography and climate ==
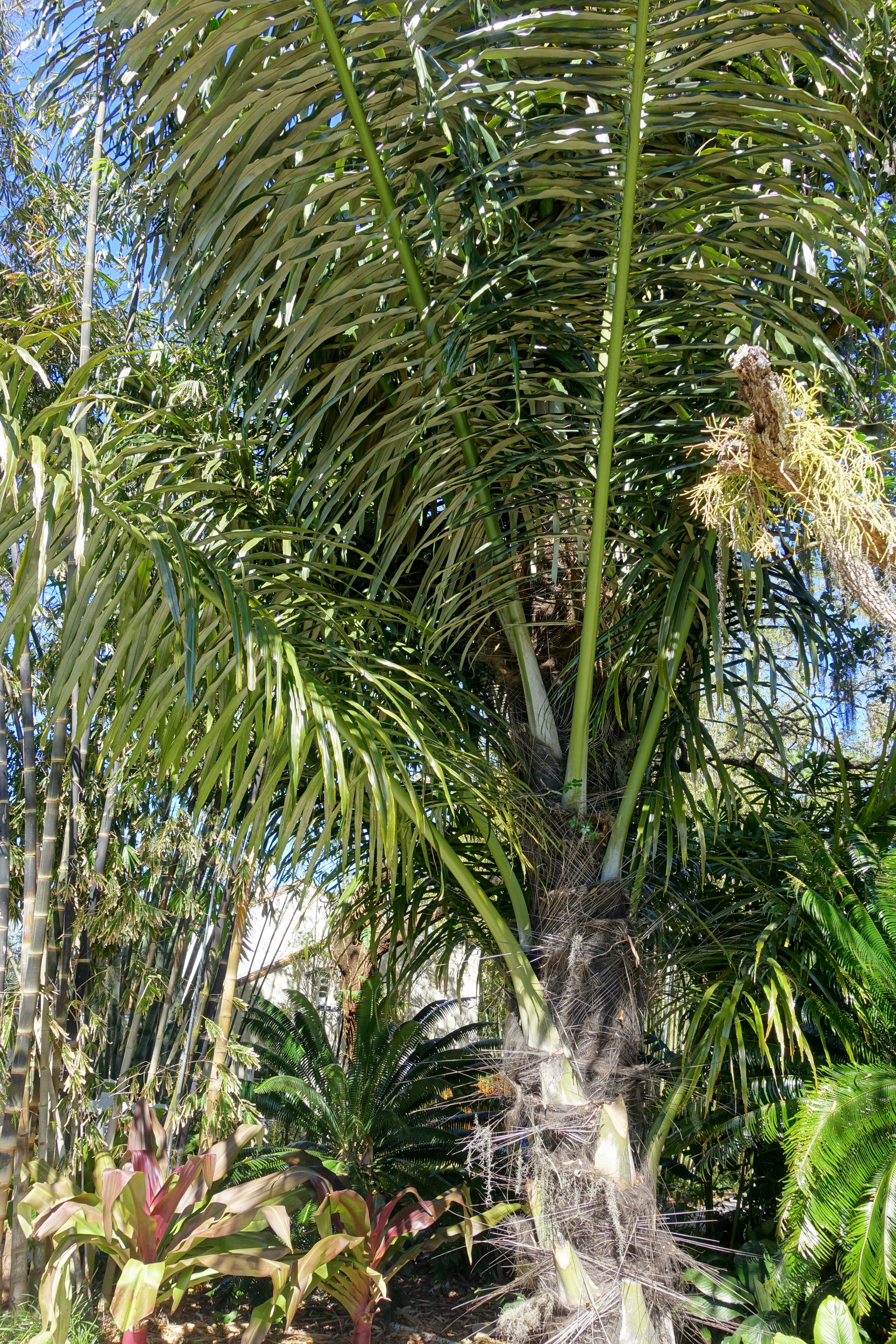
Arenga Pinnata

Hup Pa Tat is located in the area of Tham Pratun Non-hunting area, Lan Sak district, Uthai Thani city. This area is a limestone mountain range that exists outstandingly surrounded by flat area and agricultural area of the inhabitants. This limestone mountain range consists of 5 limestone mountains which are Kao Pla Ra, Kao Kaung Chai, Kao Noi, Kao Nam Chon, and Kao Huai Sok. Part of the limestone mountain range surrounding the valley is Khao Huai Sok, which is connected to Khao Plara mountain, 1 kilometer away. The surrounding limestone mountain is layered with high cliffs that restrict sunlight from reaching the ground during any time other than midday. These mountains in this area are limestone dating from the Permian period, which is 286-245 million years. This limestone mountain had been rained on for years, got dissolve by the rain that has a mild acid. The mild acid rain flowed in between the crack inside Huai Sok Mountain until it became a vast cave hole inside the mountain; the process takes about ten to a hundred thousand. This cave is a closed cave inside the mountain which humans cannot enter. While on top of the mountain range, is a forest full of plants in ancient times. Until there is an unexpected change in the Earth's crust that made the ceiling of the cave collapsed. It became a large pit inside the Huai Sok Mountain which the high of the edge is approximately 150 – 200 meters.

== Ecology ==
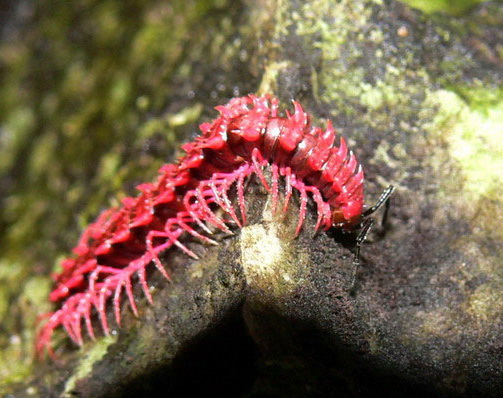
Pink dragon millipede (Desmoxytes purpurosea)

The resulting humidity has contributed to a wealth of flora, featuring large shrubs of the genus Excoecaria that are similar to ancient trees. The department of National Park stated this area as a conservation area dual to its geography with many exotic plants such as Caryota urens, Croton oblongifolius Roxb., Oxyceros horridus, balanophoraceae. Walking along the 700 meters path, animal footprints like deer, bears, boars, or tigers claw marks on the trees can be seen. Elongated tortoises and pink dragon millipede can be found in this area. The Pink dragon millipedes can be seen during the rainy season, around August - November. The pink dragon millipede has a bright pink color, looks like the pollen of the flower. It has an outstanding character with a pattern and button that similar to a dragon. It can be found in a forest with high humidity and abundance.

== Facilities ==
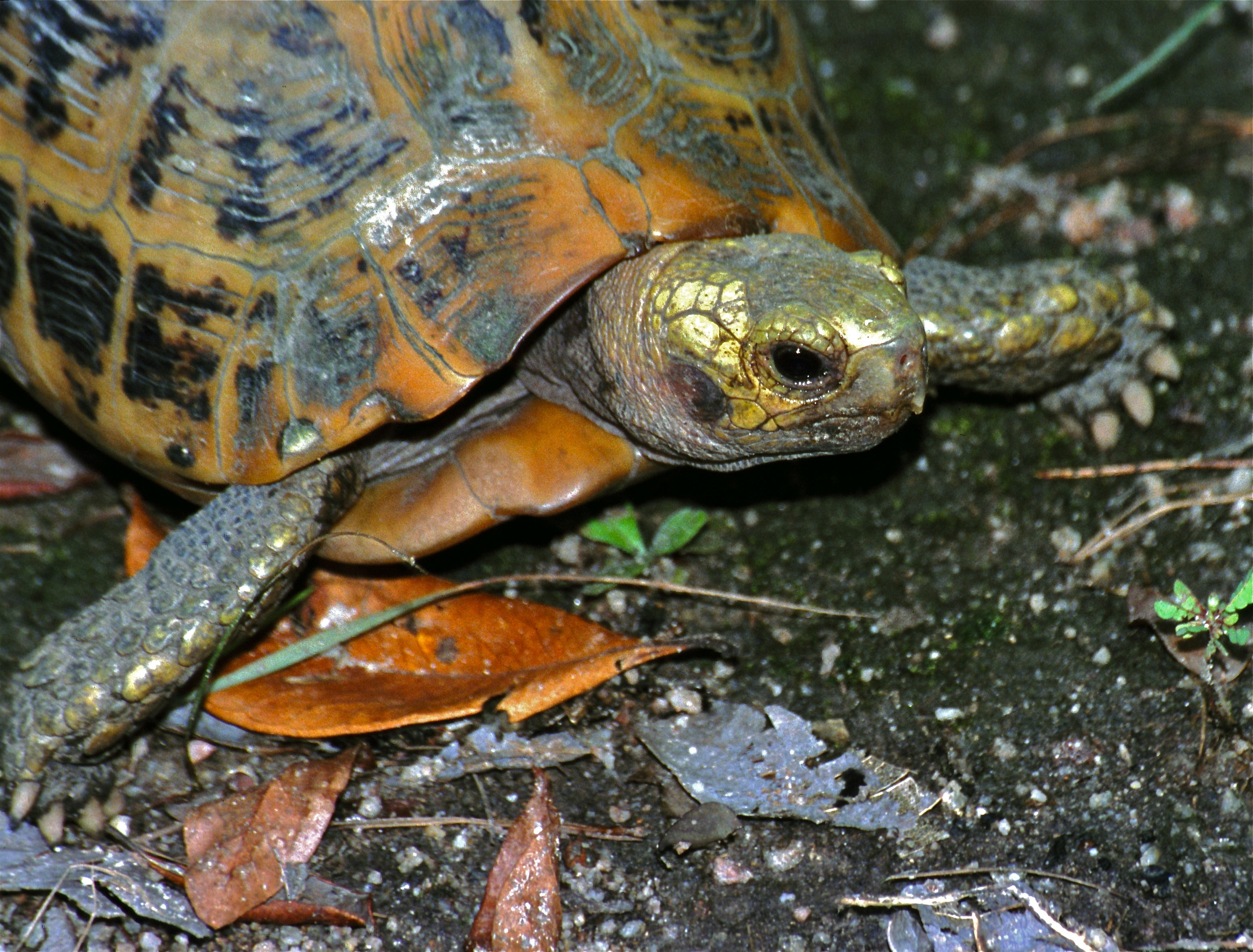
Elongated Tortoise (Indotestudo elongata)

In the valley, there are organized walking paths along the way. After purchasing the admission tickets, visitors receive flashlights. There are a parking lot, bathroom, a kiosk offering coffee, and shops for snacks and drinks. During weekends at the entrance, young guides from a local school are available for guiding and touring around along the path.

== Access ==
Hup Pa Tat is located in Tham Pa Thun Non-Hunting Area, at Mu 1, Thung Na Ngam, Lan Sak District, Uthai Thani. From Uthai Thani, take Highway 333, Uthai Thani – Nong Chang route. Then, proceed on Highway No.3438, Nong Chang–Lan Sak route. It is 50.6 kilometers away from Uthai Thani city. A ticket for Thai adults is 20 baht, while for children it is 10 baht. For a foreigner, it will be charging at 200 baht. The opening hours are between 8.30 a.m. to 4 p.m.
