= White-eyed river martin =

Conservation status
- Critically Endangered (IUCN 3.1)
- CITES Appendix I

Scientific classification
- Kingdom: Animalia
- Phylum: Chordata
- Class: Aves
- Order: Passeriformes
- Family: Hirundinidae
- Genus: Pseudochelidon
- Species: P. sirintarae

Binomial name
- Pseudochelidon sirintarae Thonglongya, K, 1968; Holotype from Bung Boraphet, Amphoe Mueang, Nakhon Sawan Province, Thailand
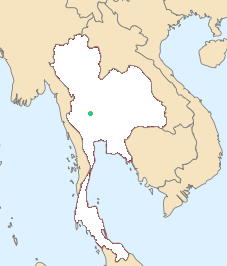
- Spot shows former wintering location within Thailand; the breeding range is unknown.

Synonyms
- Eurochelidon sirintarae (Thonglongya, 1968)

Species of bird

The white-eyed river martin (Pseudochelidon sirintarae) is a passerine bird, one of only two members of the river martin subfamily of the swallows. Since it has significant differences from its closest relative, the African river martin, it is sometimes placed in its own genus, Eurochelidon. First found in 1968, it is known only from a single wintering site in Thailand, and may be extinct, since it has not been seen since 1980 despite targeted surveys in Thailand and neighbouring Cambodia. It may possibly still breed in China or Southeast Asia, but a Chinese painting initially thought to depict this species was later reassessed as showing pratincoles.

The adult white-eyed river martin is a medium-sized swallow, with mainly glossy greenish-black plumage, a white rump, and a tail which has two elongated slender central tail feathers, each widening to a racket-shape at the tip. It has a white eye ring and a broad, bright greenish-yellow bill. The sexes are similar in appearance, but the juvenile lacks the tail ornaments and is generally browner than the adult. Little is known of the behaviour or breeding habitat of this martin, although like other swallows it feeds on insects caught in flight, and its wide bill suggests that it may take relatively large species. It roosts in reed beds in winter, and may nest in river sandbanks, probably in April or May before the summer rains. It may have been overlooked prior to its discovery because it tended to feed at dawn or dusk rather than during the day.

The martin's apparent demise may have been hastened by trapping, loss of habitat and the construction of dams. The winter swallow roosts at the only known location of this martin have greatly reduced in numbers, and birds breeding at river habitats have declined throughout the region. The white-eyed river martin is one of only two birds endemic to Thailand, and the country's government has noted this through the issues of a stamp and a high-value commemorative coin.

== Taxonomy ==
Within the swallow family, the white-eyed river martin is one of only two members of the river martin subfamily Pseudochelidoninae, the other being the African river martin Pseudochelidon eurystomina of the Congo Basin in Africa. These two species possess a number of distinctive features which mark them out from other swallows and martins, including their robust legs and feet, and stout bills. The extent of their differences from other swallows and the wide geographical separation of the two martins suggest that they are relict populations of a group of species that diverged from the main swallow lineage early in its evolution. The separation of this subfamily is supported by genetic evidence, and their habit of nesting in burrows is thought to be characteristic of the earliest members of the swallow family.

The white-eyed river martin was discovered in 1968 by Thai ornithologist Kitti Thonglongya, who gave the bird its current binomial name. The genus name Pseudochelidon (Hartlaub, 1861) comes from the Ancient Greek prefix ψευδο/pseudo "false" and χελιδον/chelidôn, "swallow", and the species name sirintarae commemorates Princess Maha Chakri Sirindhorn of Thailand.

The African and Asian Pseudochelidon species differ markedly in the size of their bills and eyes, suggesting that they have different feeding ecologies, with the white-eyed river martin probably able to take much larger prey. The Thai species also has a swollen, hard gape (fleshy interior of the bill) unlike the softer, fleshier, and much less prominent gape of the African river martin. Thonglongya estimated the bill of the Thai species to be 17.6% wider than that of the African bird, but a later estimate, using specimens preserved in alcohol instead of dried skins (to avoid shrinkage), gave a difference of 22.5% between the bills of the two swallows. Following a suggestion by Kitti in his original paper, Richard Brooke proposed in 1972 that the white-eyed river martin was sufficiently different from the African species to be placed in a separate monotypic genus Eurochelidon, but this was contested by other authorities. The new genus was not subsequently widely adopted by other authors, although BirdLife International uses Eurochelidon.

== Description ==
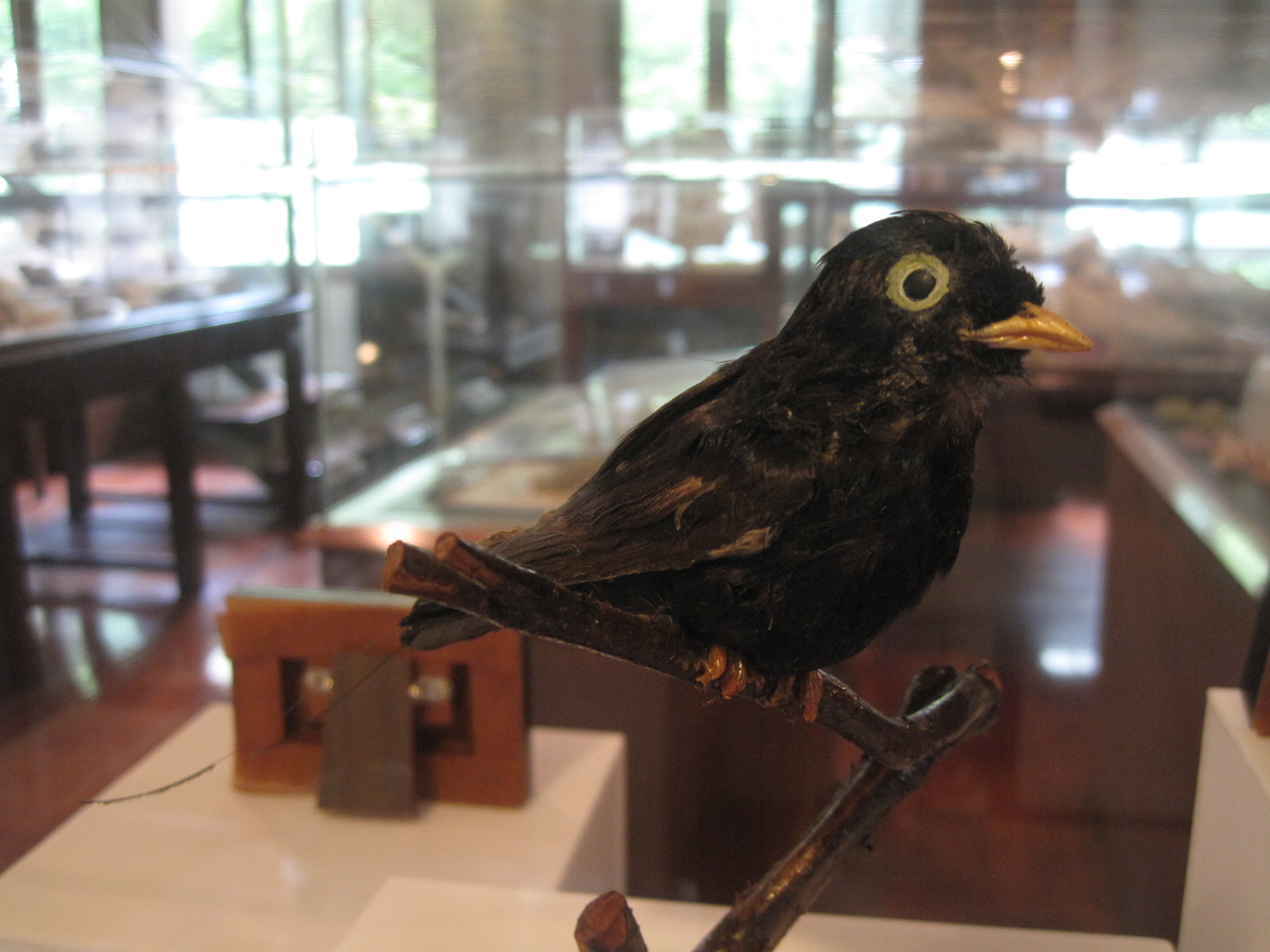
Stuffed specimen at Chulalongkorn University Museum of Natural History

The adult white-eyed river martin is a medium-sized swallow, 18 cm (7 in) long, with mainly silky black plumage and a white rump. The back is green-glossed black, and is separated from the similarly coloured upper tail by a narrow bright white rump band. The head is darker than the back, with a velvet-black chin leading to blue-green glossed black underparts. The wings are black, with brown inner edges to the flight feathers, and the tail is green-glossed black with two elongated, slender, central tail feathers, up to 9 cm (3.5 in) long. These expand slightly at the tips to give narrow racquets 4.9–8.5 cm (1.9–3.3 in) long. The wing length averages 11.5 cm (4.5 in), the tail is 10.7 cm (4.2 in) long, and the tarsus averages 1.1 cm (0.43 in). The iris and eyelid are white, giving the appearance of a white eye ring, and the broad, bright greenish-yellow bill has a black hooked tip to the upper mandible. The large, strong feet and legs are flesh-coloured. This species is silent when wintering, and its breeding vocalisations are unknown. The sexes are similar, but the juvenile lacks the tail racquets, has a brown head and chin, and is generally browner than the adult. Juveniles taken in January and February were moulting their body feathers.

The original Thai name for the Pseudochelidon, only known to local people in Bueng Boraphet, was นกตาพอง (nok ta phong) which may be roughly translated as "bird with enlarged eyes". After its official discovery in 1968, it was named นกเจ้าฟ้าหญิงสิรินธร (nok chaofa ying sirinthon, lit. "Princess Sirindhorn's bird").

== Distribution and habitat ==
The white-eyed river martin was discovered in 1968 by Kitti Thonglongya, who obtained nine specimens netted by professional bird-hunters as part of a migratory bird survey at a night-time roost at Thailand's largest freshwater lake, Bueng Boraphet, in Nakhon Sawan Province. It was first seen in the wild by ornithologists at the same wintering site in 1977. The species has only been seen at the lake, always between the months of November and February, and the wintering habitat is assumed to be in the vicinity of open fresh water for feeding, with reed beds for the night-time roost.

The white-eyed river martin may be migratory, and if the breeding habitat resembles that of the African river martin, it is likely to be the forested valleys of large rivers; these can provide sandbars and islands for nesting, and woodland over which the birds can catch insect prey. The breeding grounds and habitat are unknown, although river valleys in northern Thailand or southwestern China are possibilities. A claimed depiction of this species in a Chinese scroll painting initially appeared to support the possibility of the martin breeding in China. The bird in the painting had a similarly shaped head and bill, a white eye and a long tail, although it lacked the white rump, did not show the correct bill colour, and elongated the outer, rather than central, tail feathers. Painted before 1970, it pre-dated the publication of pictures of the Thai bird, so it must have been painted from life. It is now thought more likely that the scroll shows oriental pratincoles (Glareola maldivarum). Cambodia and Myanmar have also been suggested as possible refuges for the martin, but there has also been speculation on whether it is migratory at all.

== Behaviour ==
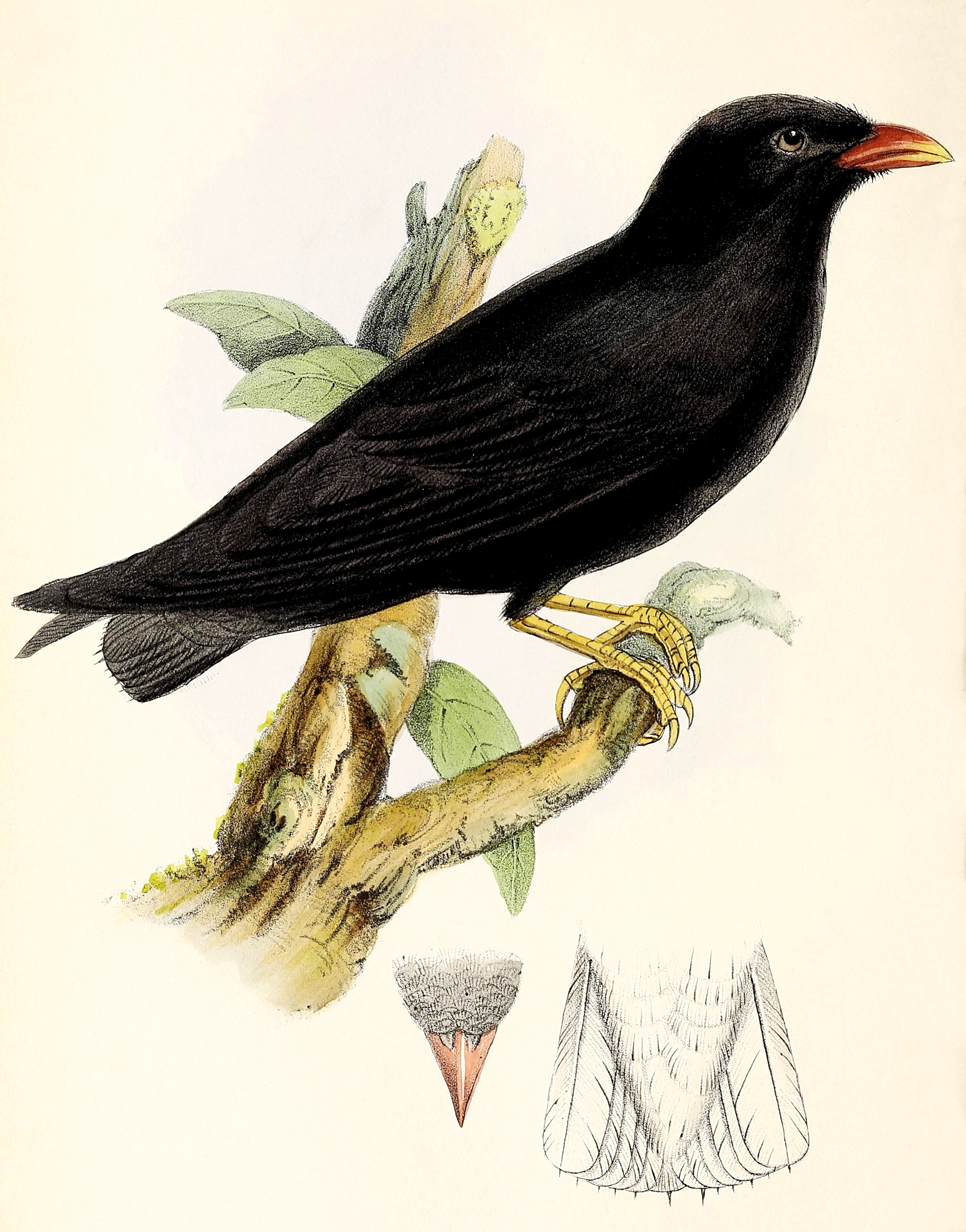
The African river martin is the white-eyed river martin's closest relative, and the two species may have similar breeding habits.

Since its breeding grounds are undiscovered, nothing is known about the white-eyed river martin's breeding biology, although it is suggested that it may nest in burrows in river sandbars, probably in April or May before the monsoon rain raises water levels. However, distinct differences in foot and toe morphology from its African relative have led some authorities to speculate that even the assumption that it nests in burrows could be incorrect. In winter, it roosts with barn swallows in reed beds.

Like other swallows, the white-eyed river martin feeds on insects, including beetles, which are caught on the wing. Given its size and unusual mouth structure, it may well take larger insects than other swallows. This species is described as graceful and buoyant in flight, and, like its African relative, appears reluctant to use perches, behaviour that, together with its unusual toe-shape and the fact that mud was found on the toes of one of the first specimens, suggest that this species may be relatively terrestrial.

Pamela C. Rasmussen suggested that, given its unusually large eyes, the species might be nocturnal or at least crepuscular, a factor that could make it very inconspicuous, and thus partly explain how it remained undetected for so long. Although the fact that the first specimens were supposedly collected roosting at night in reedbeds might appear to contradict this theory, it is possible that the birds might not have been caught at the roost. Alternatively, they might be capable of both diurnal and nocturnal behaviour, or be crepuscular, depending on the season or circumstance.

== Status ==
The white-eyed river martin was seen in Thailand in 1972, 1977 and 1980, but not definitely since, although there is an unconfirmed sighting from Thailand from 1986. The only colour photographs of a living bird are of one individual captured and ringed by Elliott McClure in 1968. It is classified as Critically Endangered, which is the highest risk category assigned by the International Union for the Conservation of Nature and Natural Resources (IUCN) for wild species. The designation means that a species' numbers have decreased, or will decrease, by 80% within three generations. The IUCN does not consider a species extinct until extensive targeted surveys have been conducted, but the white-eyed river martin may well no longer exist in the wild, and was probably always rare.

There has been a drastic decline in the Bueng Boraphet swallow population from the hundreds of thousands reported to roost around 1970 to maximum counts of 8,000 made in the winter of 1980–1981, although it is not certain if this represents a real decline or a shift in site in response to hunting. Other potential causes for the martin's decline include the disturbance of sand bars in the rivers, and the construction of dams (which flood the area upstream and change the water flow downstream), deforestation, and increasing conversion of its habitat to agriculture. Other Southeast Asian species using riverine sand bars have also been adversely affected by disturbance and habitat degradation. Very few swallows of any kind now roost in the Bueng Boraphet reedbeds, preferring sugarcane plantations, and, despite searching, the white-eyed river martin has not been found in other nearby large swallow roosts.

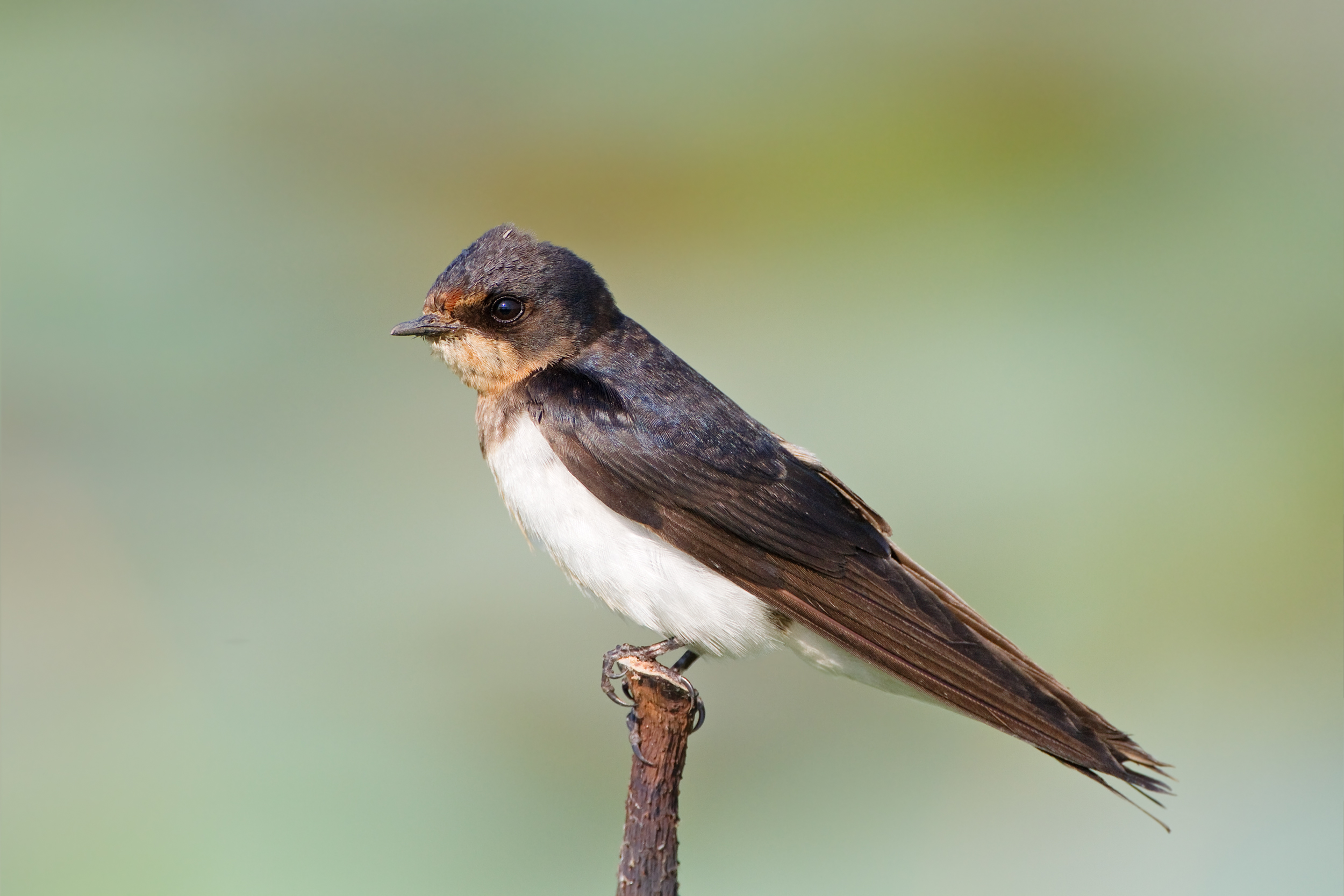
The numbers of barn swallows at Bueng Boraphet, which the martin accompanied to roost, are greatly reduced.

The martin is legally protected under Appendix 1 (the highest category) of the Convention on International Trade in Endangered Species of Wild Fauna and Flora (CITES) agreement, and is one of 15 "Reserved Species" in Thailand which, under the provisions of the Wild Animal Reservation and Protection Act, BE 2535, cannot be legally hunted, collected, or kept in captivity under any circumstances. Despite official protection, the martin was captured by locals along with other swallows for sale as food or for release by devout Buddhists, and following its discovery by ornithologists, trappers were reported to have caught as many as 120 individuals and sold them to the director of the Nakhon Sawan Fisheries Station who was unable to keep them alive in captivity. Two birds sent to Bangkok Zoo in 1971 also soon died. The small population may therefore have become non-viable.

Bueng Boraphet has been declared a Non-Hunting Area in an effort to protect the species, but surveys to find this martin have been unsuccessful. These include several searches at the main site, a 1969 survey of the Nan, Yom and Wang Rivers of northern Thailand, and a 1996 survey of rivers in northern Laos. A possible sighting was made in Cambodia in 2004, but a 2008 investigation using speedboat surveys and interviews with villagers in Cambodia near the location of the claimed sighting failed to find any positive evidence, and noted that the habitat was in poor condition. Nevertheless, animals as large as the saola have been rediscovered in Southeast Asia, so it is conceivable that a small population of the martin survives. Despite the lack of records from China, a 2000 field guide covering the region included this species, since it is the mostly likely breeding area outside Thailand, although it is omitted from the 2008 Birds of East Asia.

The white-eyed river martin and the Deignan's babbler (Stachyridopsis rodolphei), (Note: The status of Deignan's babbler is disputed, some authorities considering it to be a subspecies of rufous-fronted babbler, Stachyridopsis rufifrons. It is currently still listed as a separate species by the International Ornithologists' Union.) are the only bird species endemic to Thailand, and the martin has attracted sufficient interest to be featured on a 75 satang postage stamp in 1975, as one of a set of four depicting Thai birds, and on a 5,000 Thai baht conservation issue gold coin in 1974.

== Cited texts ==
- Turner, Angela K; Rose, Chris (1989). A Handbook to the Swallows and Martins of the World. Christopher Helm. ISBN 0-7470-3202-5.
