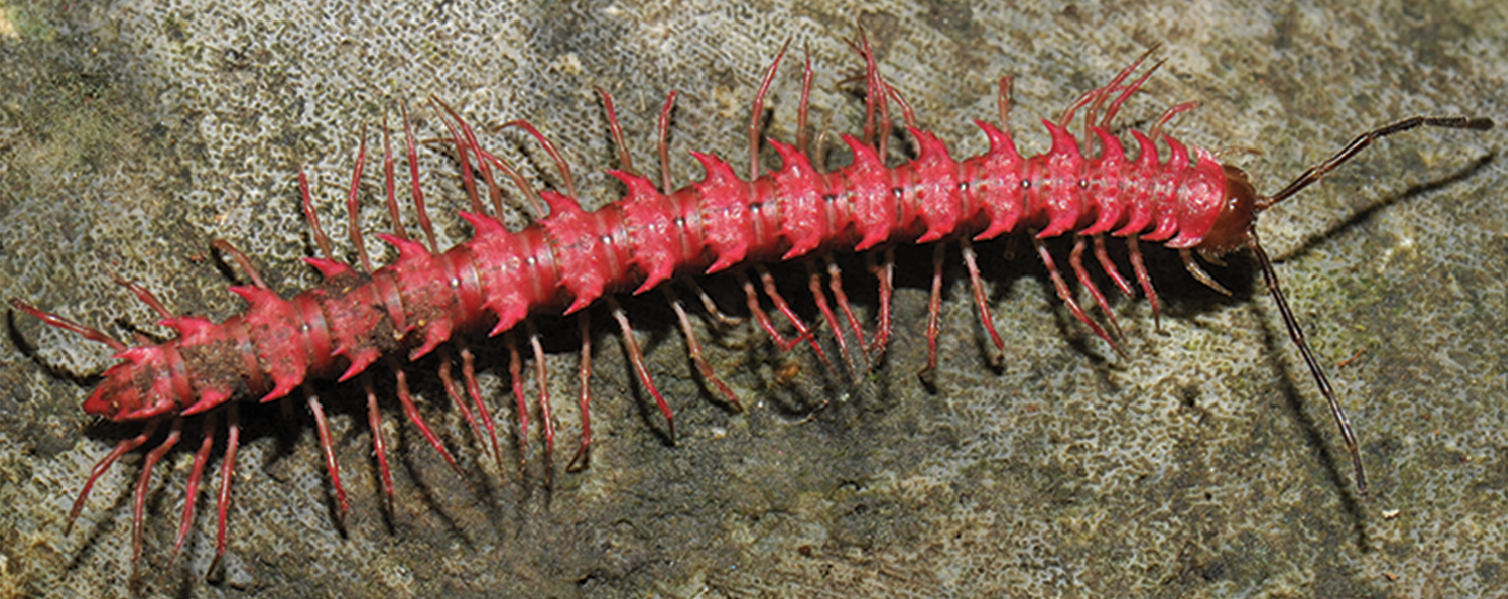
- Female Desmoxytes golovatchi

Scientific classification
- Kingdom: Animalia
- Phylum: Arthropoda
- Subphylum: Myriapoda
- Class: Diplopoda
- Order: Polydesmida
- Family: Paradoxosomatidae
- Genus: Desmoxytes
- Species: D. golovatchi

Binomial name
- Desmoxytes golovatchi Srisonchai, Enghoff & Panha, 2018

= Desmoxytes golovatchi =

Species of millipede

Desmoxytes golovatchi, is a species of millipede in the family Paradoxosomatidae, that can be found in Thailand (Kanchanaburi Province).
