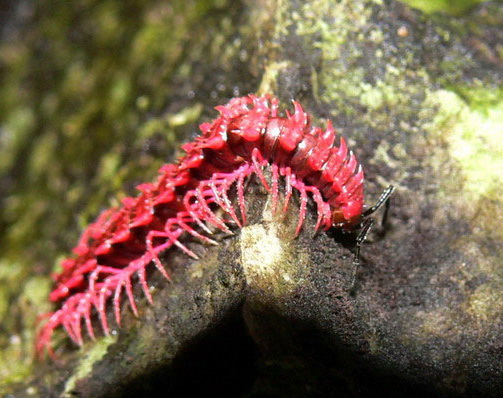

Scientific classification
- Kingdom: Animalia
- Phylum: Arthropoda
- Subphylum: Myriapoda
- Class: Diplopoda
- Order: Polydesmida
- Family: Paradoxosomatidae
- Subfamily: Paradoxosomatinae
- Tribe: Orthomorphini
- Genus: Desmoxytes
- Species: D. purpurosea

Binomial name
- Desmoxytes purpurosea Enghoff, Sutcharit, & Panha, 2007

= Desmoxytes purpurosea =

Species of millipede

Desmoxytes purpurosea, commonly known as the shocking pink dragon millipede or dragon millipede, is a spiny and toxic millipede named for its vivid pink color. It was formally described in 2007 from a specimen collected at the Hup Pa Tat limestone cavern in the Uthai Thani Province of Thailand. Among the largest species of its genus, the adult millipede is approximately 3 cm (1.2 in) long. It lives in the open on leaf litter. Large numbers of them occur after rain showers. The millipede has glands that produce hydrogen cyanide to protect it from predators, which causes it to smell like almonds. Its toxicity is advertised by its aposematic color.

The shocking pink dragon millipede was named third in the top ten new species list of 2008 by the International Institute for Species Exploration.

Other species of genus Desmoxytes can be brightly colored, sometimes in shades of red, as in Desmoxytes rubra.
