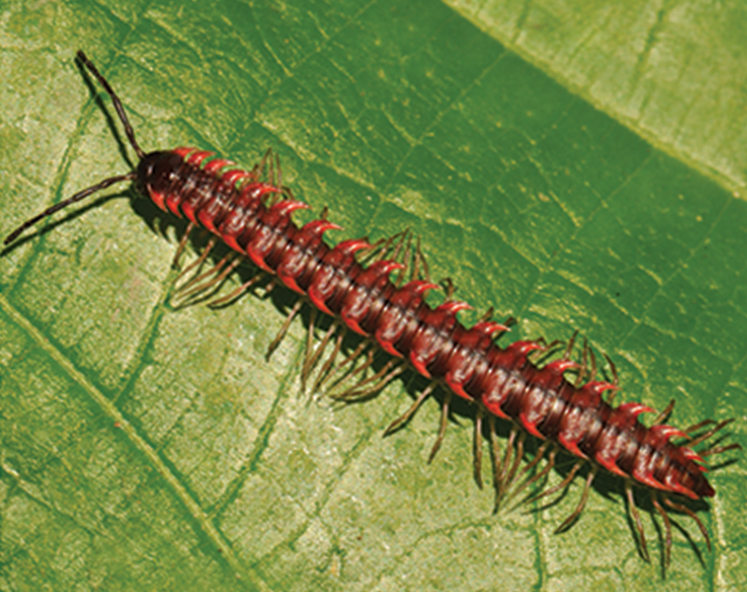
- Female Desmoxytes cervina

Scientific classification
- Kingdom: Animalia
- Phylum: Arthropoda
- Subphylum: Myriapoda
- Class: Diplopoda
- Order: Polydesmida
- Family: Paradoxosomatidae
- Genus: Desmoxytes
- Species: D. cervina

Binomial name
- Desmoxytes cervina (Pocock, 1895)

Synonyms
- Desmoxytes pterygota Golovatch & Enghoff, 1994

= Desmoxytes cervina =

Species of millipede

Desmoxytes cervina, is a species of millipede in the family Paradoxosomatidae. It is known from Myanmar (Lenya National Park) and Thailand (Chumphon, Krabi, Nakhon Si Thammarat, Phang Nga, Phuket, Ranong, and Surat Thani).
