= Thung Luilai =

Sub District in Thailand

Coordinates: 16.494151°N 101.802083°E

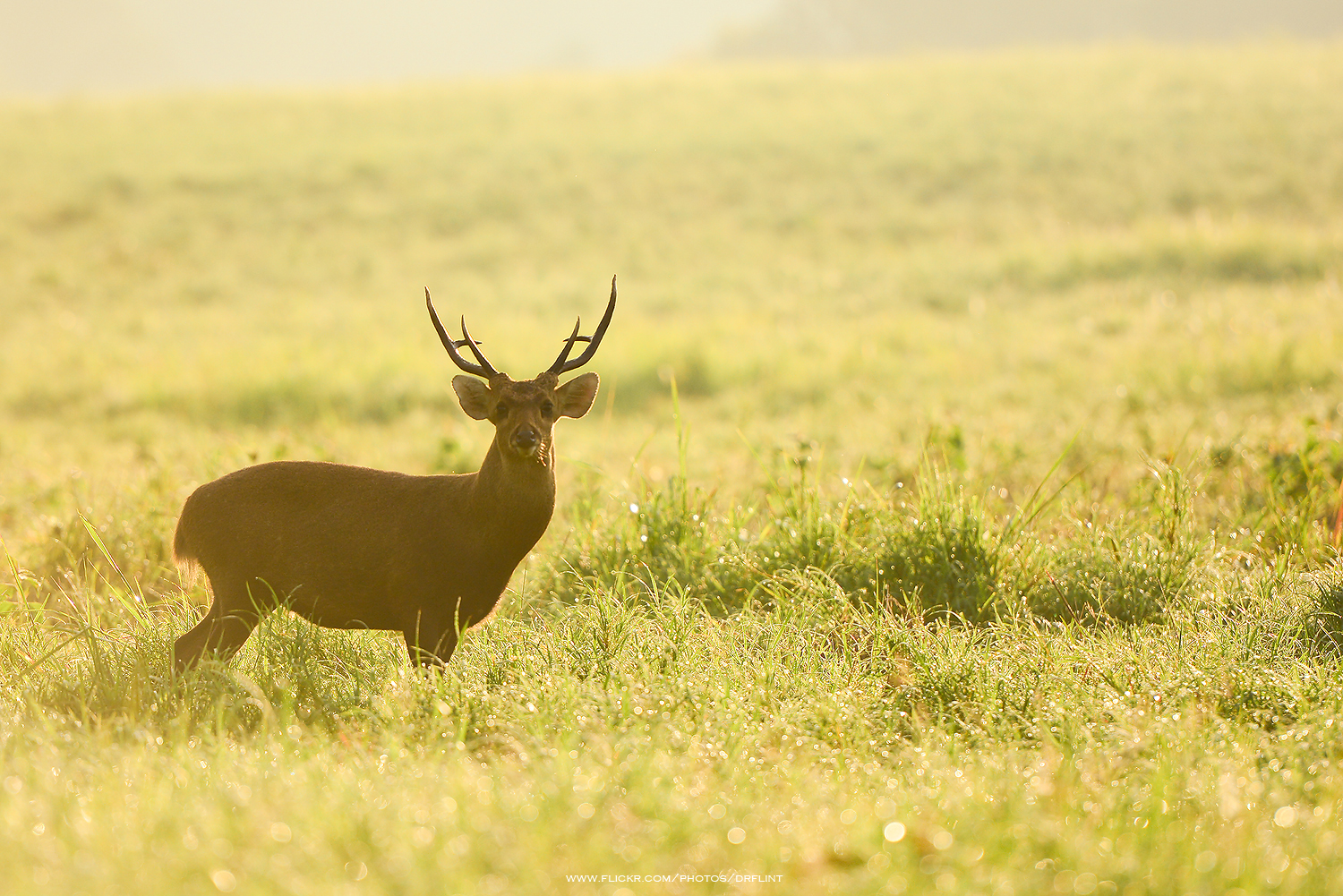
Indian hog deer (Hyelaphus porcinus) in Phu Khiao Wildlife Sanctuary

Thung Luilai (Thai: ทุ่งลุยลาย, pronounced [tʰûŋ lūj lāːj]; Northeastern Thai: ท่งลุยลาย, pronounced [tʰōŋ lûj lâːj]) is a tambon (sub-district) of Khon San District, Chaiyaphum Province, northeastern Thailand. It is one of the eight sub-districts of Khon San District.

== Geography ==
Thung Luilai has a total area of 725 square kilometers (470,000 rai), 31 km (19.3 mi) from district office.

Neighbouring areas (from north clockwise): Thung Phra and Huai Yang in its district, Nong Phon Ngam in Kaset Sombun, and Nam Nao in Phetchabun Province.

Most of the area is mountainous and a small hillside plain.

== Demography ==
Total population of 6,147 people (3,056 men, 3,091 women) in 2,098 households.

== Economy ==
Thung Luilai residents are mainly engaged in agriculture. A small percentage of them are employed.

== Administration ==
The sub-district is governed by the Subdistrict-Municipality Thung Luilai (เทศบาลตำบลทุ่งลุยลาย).

The area also consists of seven administrative villages (muban).

No.	Name	Thai
1.	Ban Thung Luilai	บ้านทุ่งลุยลาย
2.	Ban Rong Wae	บ้านร่องแว่
3.	Ban Nam Thip	บ้านน้ำทิพย์
4.	Ban Nong Ya Kong	บ้านหนองหญ้าโก่ง
5.	Ban Nong Chiang Rot Tai	บ้านหนองเชียงรอดใต้
6.	Ban Non Sila	บ้านโนนศิลา
7.	Ban Nong Chiang Rot Nuea	บ้านหนองเชียงรอดเหนือ

== Places ==
- Wat Thung Luilai Temple
- Chulabhorn Dam, also known as Nam Phrom Dam
- Phu Khiao Wildlife Sanctuary
- Phu Khiao Wildlife Breeding Station

== In Pop Culture ==
Thung Luilai is the setting of a dance luk thung (country music) song, titled 'Kid Teung Thung Luilai' (คิดถึงทุ่งลุยลาย, "missing Thung Luilai"). It was sung by many performers, including Yui Yatyer and Tai Orathai, but the original belongs to Yenjit Porntawi since the 1980s.
