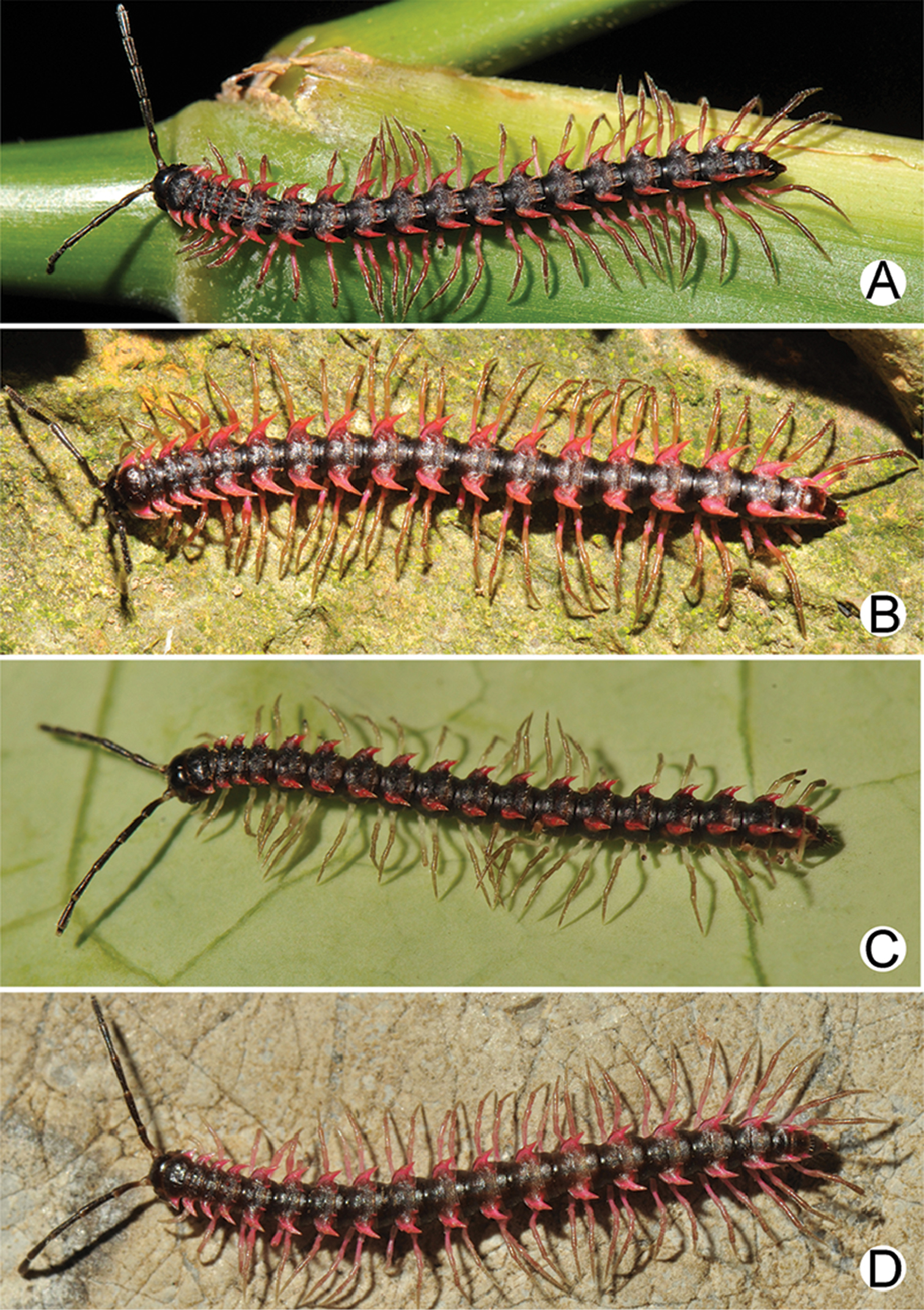

Scientific classification
- Kingdom: Animalia
- Phylum: Arthropoda
- Subphylum: Myriapoda
- Class: Diplopoda
- Order: Polydesmida
- Family: Paradoxosomatidae
- Genus: Desmoxytes
- Species: D. planata

Binomial name
- Desmoxytes planata (Pocock, 1895)

Synonyms
- Pratinus planatus Pocock, 1895; Desmoxytes coniger Chamberlin, 1923; Euphyodesmus (Ceylonesmus) vector Chamberlin, 1941

= Desmoxytes planata =

Species of millipede

Desmoxytes planata, is a species of millipedes in the family Paradoxosomatidae. It is a pantropical species with a vast distribution due to human interference in transportation. It is native to Andaman Islands and introduced to Thailand, the Seychelles, Java, Sri Lanka, Fiji and probably in Malay Peninsula.

Live specimens are pink colored.
