= Reserved wild animals of Thailand =

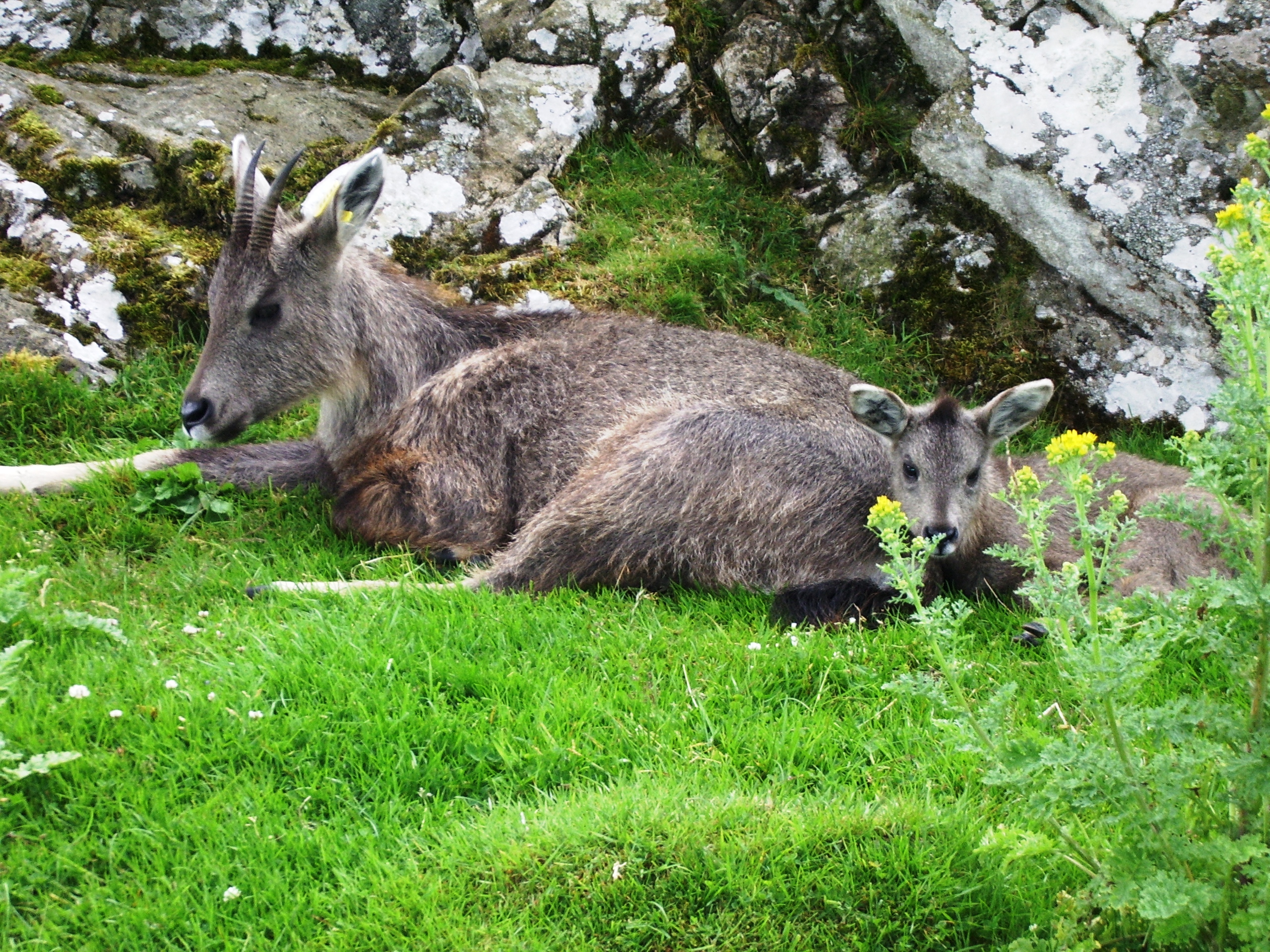
Nemorhaedus griseus arnouxianus with kid, identified as Chinese Goral, at the Highland Wildlife Park.

Reserved wild animals are the highest class of protection for animal species in Thailand's wildlife conservation framework. There are currently twenty designated species, defined by The Wild Animal Conservation and Protection Act B.E. 2562 (2019). The 2019 act replaced the original law from 1992. The law prohibits hunting, breeding, possessing, or trading any of such species, except when done for scientific research with permission from the Permanent Secretary of National Park, Wildlife and Plant Conservation, or breeding and possession by authorised public zoos.

The twenty-one conserved wild animals are:

| Common name(s) | Local name(s) | Scientific name | Year | Group | Description |
|---|---|---|---|---|---|
| Javan rhinoceros | แรด | Rhinoceros sondaicus | 1960 | Mammal | |
| Sumatran rhinoceros | กระซู่ | Dicerorhinus sumatrensis | 1960 | Mammal | |
| Kouprey | กูปรี (โคไพร) | Bos sauveli | 1960 | Mammal | |
| Wild Asian water buffalo | ควายป่า | Bubalus bubalis (B. arnee) | 1960 | Mammal | |
| Mainland serow | เลียงผา (เยือง หรือ กูรำ หรือ โครำ) | Capricornis sumatraensis | 1960 | Mammal | |
| Chinese goral | กวางผา | Naemorhedus griseus | 1960 | Mammal | |
| Schomburgk's deer | สมัน (เนื้อสมัน หรือ กวางเขาสุ่ม) | Cervus schomburgki | 1960 | Mammal | |
| Eld's deer | ละอง (ละมั่ง) | Cervus eldii | 1960 | Mammal | |
| Fea's muntjac | เก้งหม้อ | Muntiacus feae | 1992 | Mammal | |
| Dugong | พะยูน (หมูน้ำ หรือ วัวทะเล) | Dugong dugon | 1992 | Mammal | |
| Malayan tapir | สมเสร็จ | Tapirus indicus | 1992 | Mammal | |
| Marbled cat | แมวลายหินอ่อน | Pardofelis marmorata | 1992 | Mammal | |
| White-eyed river martin | นกเจ้าฟ้าหญิงสิรินธร | Pseudochelidon sirintarae | 1992 | Bird | |
| Gurney's pitta | นกแต้วแร้วท้องดำ | Pitta gurneyi | 1992 | Bird | |
| Sarus crane | นกกระเรียน | Grus antigone | 1992 | Bird | |
| Leatherback turtle | เต่ามะเฟือง | Dermochelys coriacea | 2019 | Reptile | |
| Whale shark | ฉลามวาฬ | Rhincodon typus | 2019 | Fish | |
| Bryde's whale | วาฬบรูดา | Balaenoptera edeni | 2019 | Mammal | |
| Omura's whale | วาฬโอมูระ | Balaenoptera omurai | 2019 | Mammal | |
| Helmeted hornbill | นกชนหิน | Rhinoplax vigil | 2024 | Bird | |
| Blue whale | วาฬสีน้ำเงิน | Balaenoptera musculus | 2024 | Mammal | |

Of these twenty-one species, the Schomburgk's deer is already extinct, and the Javan and Sumatran rhinoceros are locally extinct in Thailand.

In 1992, Indian hog deer (Axis porcinus) (เนื้อทราย), added in 1960, was removed from the list.

In the near future, Thailand will add Irrawaddy dolphin (Orcaella brevirostris) (โลมาหัวบาตร) as a reserved species after only 14 of them were found in the latest survey of Songkhla Lake.
