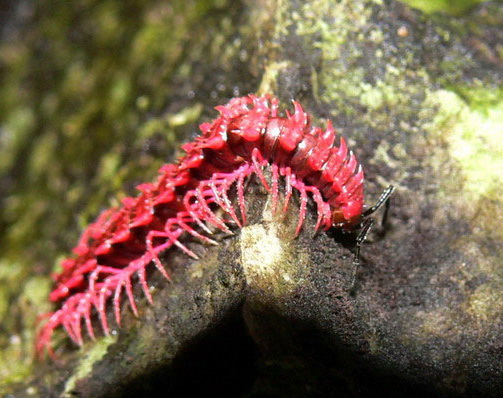
- Desmoxytes purpurosea, the "shocking pink dragon millipede" from Thailand

Scientific classification
- Domain: Eukaryota
- Kingdom: Animalia
- Phylum: Arthropoda
- Subphylum: Myriapoda
- Class: Diplopoda
- Order: Polydesmida
- Family: Paradoxosomatidae
- Subfamily: Paradoxosomatinae
- Tribe: Orthomorphini
- Genus: Desmoxytes; Chamberlin, 1923

Type species
- Desmoxytes planata (Pocock, 1895)

Species
- 18, see text

= Desmoxytes =

Genus of millipedes

Desmoxytes, whose species are commonly known as the dragon millipedes, is a genus of millipedes of the family Paradoxosomatidae found in Southeast Asia. The genus was described by Ralph Vary Chamberlin in 1923, and reviewed by Sergei Golovatch and Henrik Enghoff in 1994. At least 18 species are known from to Malaysia, Myanmar, and Thailand. One species, D. planata, has also been observed in Sri Lanka, the Andaman Islands, Seychelles, Java, Great Coco Island, and Fiji; however, this species has expanded its range by being transported through human activity. Several species have only recently been discovered, and some have yet to be officially described.

Generally, species in this genus are striking in coloration and spiny, although several species are cave-dwelling, and show troglomorphic characteristics, such as pale brownish coloration and long, narrow spines. This genus is unique for its sculptured, ornamented dorsum, and elaborate paranota. The maximum length for a species in this genus is around 3 cm (1.2 in). Species in this genus also have the ability to produce hydrogen cyanide to ward off predators, which can give the dragon millipedes an almond-like smell.

== Species ==
Other than D. planata, each species of dragon millipede is known primarily from only one or a few locations in their country of origin. Additionally, one species from Australia, Desmoxytoides hasenpuschorum, is extremely similar to Desmoxytes, but has been split into its own monotypic genus; speculation exists, even by the genus authority for Desmoxytoides, that this split is not necessary. In 2018, the genus Hylomus was reinstated and 33 Desmoxytes species were reassigned to this genus.

Binomial names	Authority	Year	Range
Desmoxytes aurata	Srisonchai, Enghoff & Panha	2018	Thailand
Desmoxytes breviverpa	Srisonchai, Enghoff & Panha	2016	Thailand
Desmoxytes cervina	Pocock	1895	Myanmar
Desmoxytes corythosaurus	Srisonchai, Enghoff & Panha	2018	Thailand
Desmoxytes delfae	Jeekel	1964	Thailand
Desmoxytes des	Srisonchai, Enghoff & Panha	2016	Thailand
Desmoxytes euros	Srisonchai, Enghoff & Panha	2018	Thailand
Desmoxytes flabella	Srisonchai, Enghoff & Panha	2018	Thailand
Desmoxytes golovatchi	Srisonchai, Enghoff & Panha	2018	Thailand
Desmoxytes octoconigera	Srisonchai, Enghoff & Panha	2018	Thailand
Desmoxytes perakensis	Srisonchai, Enghoff & Panha	2018	Malaysia
Desmoxytes pinnasquali	Srisonchai, Enghoff & Panha	2016	Thailand
Desmoxytes planata	Pocock	1895	widespread
Desmoxytes purpurosea	Enghoff, Sutcharit & Panha	2007	Thailand
Desmoxytes takensis	Srisonchai, Enghoff & Panha	2016	Thailand
Desmoxytes taurina	Pocock	1895	Myanmar
Desmoxytes terae	Jeekel	1964	Malaysia, Thailand
Desmoxytes waepyanensis	Srisonchai, Enghoff & Panha	2018	Myanmar
