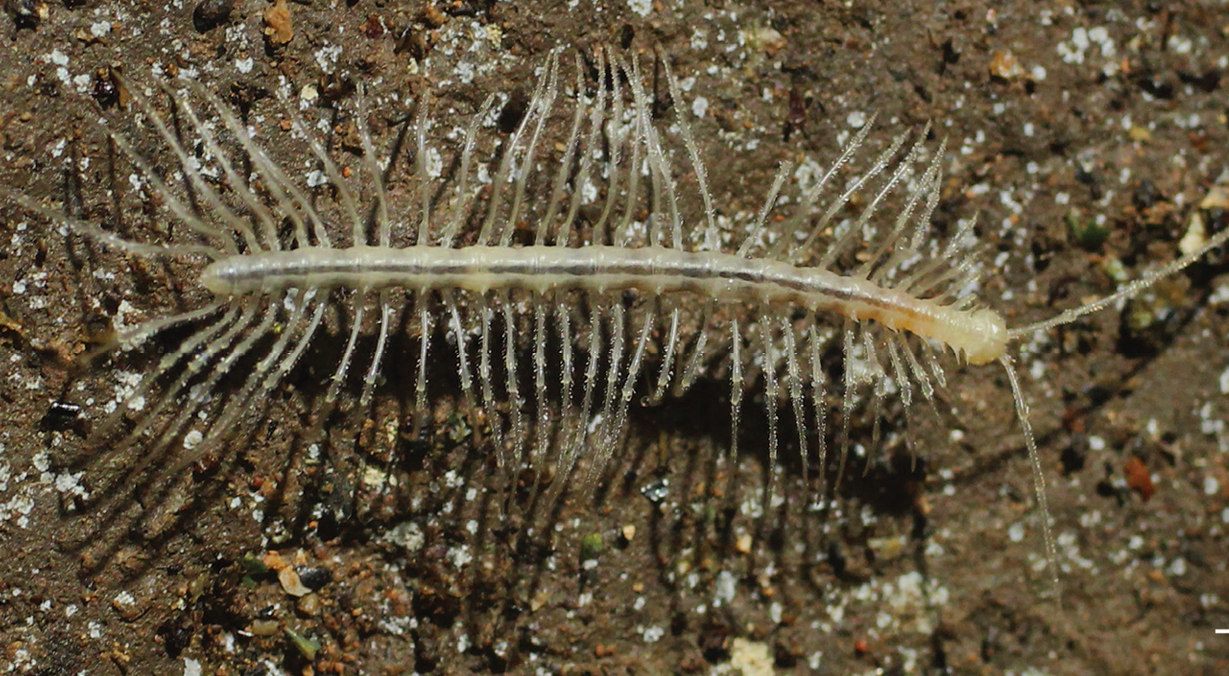
- Hylomus yuani from Liangfeng Cave

Scientific classification
- Domain: Eukaryota
- Kingdom: Animalia
- Phylum: Arthropoda
- Subphylum: Myriapoda
- Class: Diplopoda
- Order: Polydesmida
- Family: Paradoxosomatidae
- Subfamily: Paradoxosomatinae
- Tribe: Orthomorphini
- Genus: Hylomus; Cook and Loomis, 1924

Type species
- Hylomus draco Cook & Loomis, 1924

Species
- Hylomus asper (Attems, 1937); Hylomus cattienensis (Nguyen, Golovatch & Anichkin, 2005); Hylomus cervarius (Attems, 1953); Hylomus cornutus (Zhang & Li, 1982); Hylomus draco Cook & Loomis, 1924; Hylomus enghoffi (Nguyen, Golovatch & Anichkin, 2005); Hylomus eupterygotus (Golovatch, Li, Lui & Geoffroy, 2012); Hylomus getuhensis (Liu, Golovatch & Tian, 2014); Hylomus grandis (Golovatch, VandenSpiegel & Semenyuk, 2016); Hylomus hostilis (Golovatch & Enghoff, 1994); Hylomus jeekeli (Golovatch & Enghoff, 1994); Hylomus laos Nguyen & Sierwald, 2019; Hylomus laticollis (Liu, Golovatch & Tian, 2016); Hylomus lingulatus (Liu, Golovatch & Tian, 2014); Hylomus longispinus (Locksa, 1960); Hylomus lui (Golovatch, Li, Liu & Geoffroy, 2012); Hylomus minituberculus (Zhang, 1986); Hylomus nodulosus (Liu, Golovatch & Tian, 2014); Hylomus parvulus (Liu, Golovatch & Tian, 2014); Hylomus phasmoides (Liu, Golovatch & Tian, 2016); Hylomus pilosus (Attems, 1937); Hylomus propinquus Golovatch, 2019; Hylomus proximus (Nguyen, Golovatch & Anichkin, 2005); Hylomus rhinoceros (Likhitrakarn, Golovatch & Panha, 2015); Hylomus rhinoparvus (Likhitrakarn, Golovatch & Panha, 2015); Hylomus scolopendroides (Golovatch, Geoffraoy & Mauriès, 2010); Hylomus scutigeroides (Golovatch, Geoffraoy & Mauriès, 2010); Hylomus similis (Liu, Golovatch & Tian, 2016); Hylomus simplex (Golovatch, VandenSpiegel & Semenyuk, 2016); Hylomus simplipodus (Liu, Golovatch & Tian, 2016); Hylomus solenophorus Nguyen, Nguyen & Eguchi, 2021; Hylomus specialis (Nguyen, Golovatch & Anichkin, 2005); Hylomus spectabilis (Attems, 1937); Hylomus spinissimus (Golovatch, Li, Lui & Geoffroy, 2012); Hylomus spinitergus (Liu, Golovatch & Tian, 2016); Hylomus srisonchaii Golovatch, 2019; Hylomus variabilis (Liu, Golovatch & Tian, 2016)

= Hylomus =

Genus of millipedes

Hylomus is a genus of millipede of the family Paradoxosomatidae found in southeast Asia.

== Species ==
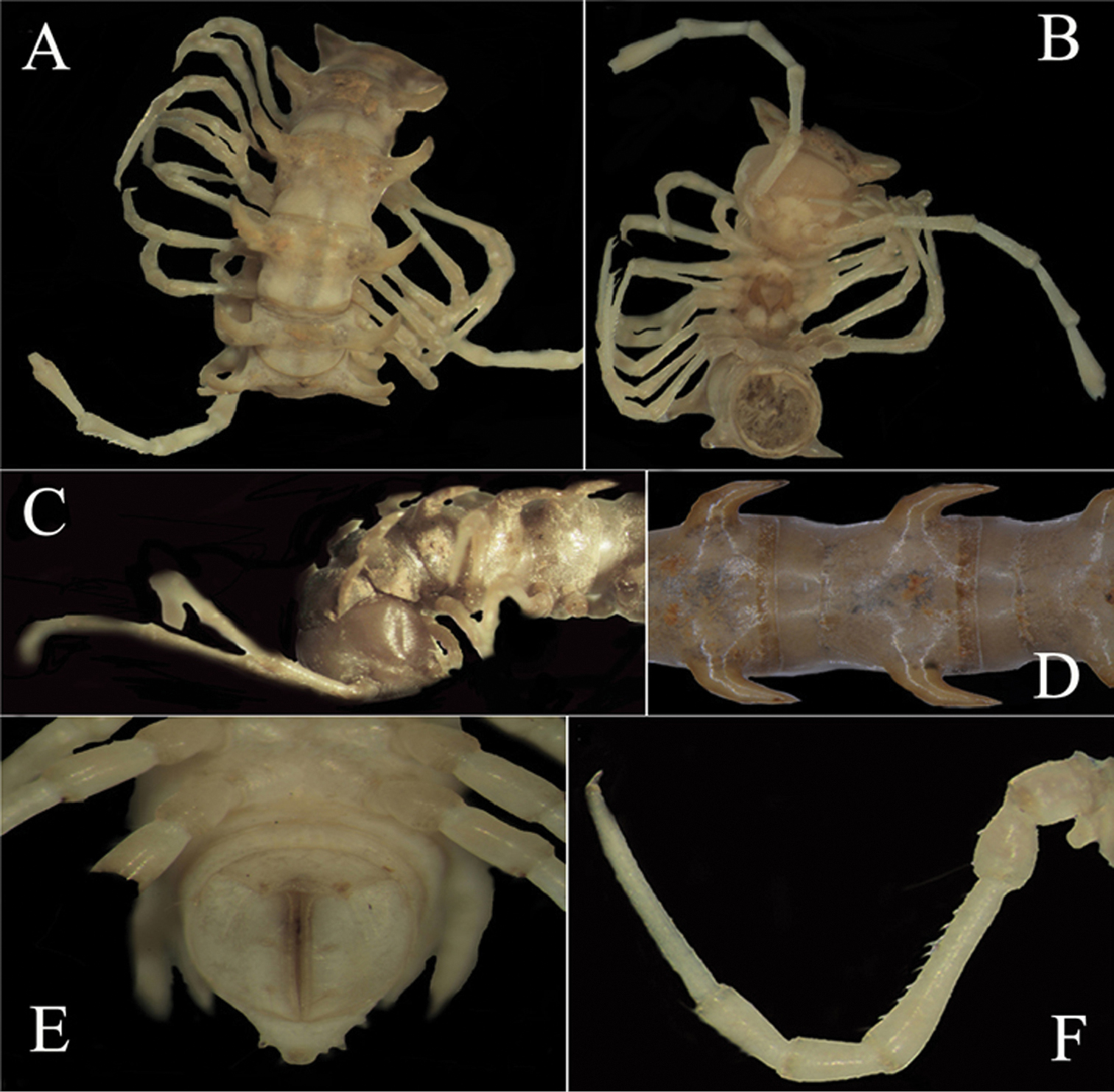
Hylomus eupterygotus, a troglomorphic species from Hunan Province, China

Binomial names	Authority	Year
Hylomus asper	(Attems	1937)
Hylomus cattienensis	(Nguyen, Golovatch & Anichkin	2005)
Hylomus cervarius	(Attems	1953)
Hylomus cornutus	(Zhang & Li	1982)
Hylomus draco	Cook & Loomis	1924
Hylomus enghoffi	(Nguyen, Golovatch & Anichkin	2005)
Hylomus eupterygotus	(Golovatch, Li, Liu & Geoffroy	2012)
Hylomus getuhensis	(Liu, Golovatch & Tian	2014)
Hylomus grandis	(Golovatch, VandenSpiegel & Semenyuk	2016)
Hylomus hostilis	(Golovatch & Enghoff	1994)
Hylomus jeekeli	(Golovatch & Enghoff	1994)
Hylomus lingulatus	(Liu, Golovatch & Tian	2014)
Hylomus laos	Nguyen & Sierwald	2019
Hylomus laticollis	(Liu, Golovatch & Tian	2016)
Hylomus longispinus	(Loksa	1960)
Hylomus lui	(Golovatch, Li, Liu & Geoffroy	2012)
Hylomus minutuberculus	(Zhang	1986)
Hylomus nodulosus	(Liu, Golovatch & Tian	2014)
Hylomus parvulus	(Liu, Golovatch & Tian	2014)
Hylomus phasmoides	(Liu, Golovatch & Tian	2016)
Hylomus pilosus	(Attems	1937)
Hylomus propinquus	Golovatch	2019
Hylomus proximus	(Nguyen, Golovatch & Anichkin	2005)
Hylomus rhinoceros	(Likhitrakarn, Golovatch & Panha	2015)
Hylomus rhinoparvus	(Likhitrakarn, Golovatch & Panha	2015)
Hylomus scolopendroides	(Golovatch, Geoffroy & Mauriès	2010)
Hylomus scutigeroides	(Golovatch, Geoffroy & Mauriès	2010)
Hylomus similis	(Liu, Golovatch & Tian	2016)
Hylomus simplex	(Golovatch, VandenSpiegel & Semenyuk	2016)
Hylomus simplipodus	(Liu, Golovatch & Tian	2016)
Hylomus solenophorus	Nguyen, Nguyen & Eguchi	2021
Hylomus specialis	(Nguyen, Golovatch & Anichkin	2005)
Hylomus spectabilis	(Attems	1937)
Hylomus spinitergus	(Liu, Golovatch & Tian	2016)
Hylomus srisonchaii	Golovatch	2019
Hylomus spinissimus	(Golovatch, Li, Liu & Geoffroy	2012)
Hylomus variabilis	(Liu, Golovatch & Tian	2016)
Hylomus yuani	Liu & Wynne	2019
