= Chulalongkorn University Museum of Natural History =

Museum in Bangkok, Thailand

Coordinates: 13°44′15″N 100°31′48″E

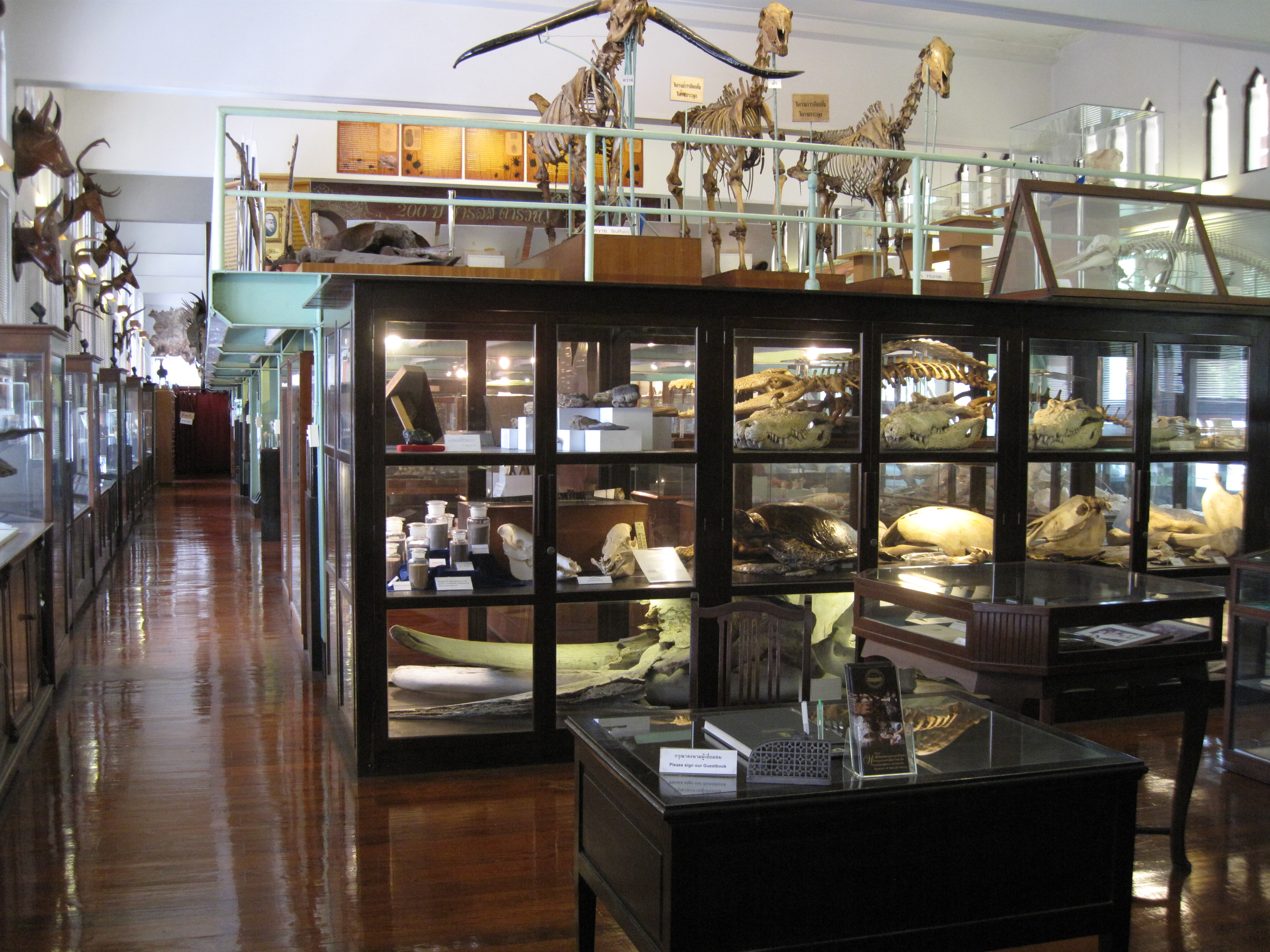
The museum's main exhibition hall

The Chulalongkorn University Museum of Natural History, founded in 1954, is operated by the Chulalongkorn University's Faculty of Science in the Biology Building at the university's main campus in Bangkok, Thailand. The museum features exhibits of various (mainly zoological) organisms, including mounts of the endangered white-eyed river martin (Princess Sirindhorn bird). The majority of the museum's exhibits are housed in its main hall, with dedicated rooms featuring Thai turtles and softshells, insects and land snails.

The museum publishes the Natural History Journal of Chulalongkorn University, and has been a partner of the Smithsonian Institution Libraries since 1976.

== See also ==
- Chulalongkorn University
- Natural history museum
