= Richard Kendall Brooke =

(1930-1996) Indian-born British ornithologist

Richard Brooke
- Born: 1930; India
- Died: 12 May 1996 (65-66 years old); Harare, Zimbabwe
- Education: Theology
- Alma mater: Rhodes University
- Scientific career
- Fields: Ornithology

Richard Kendall Brooke (1930 – 12 May 1996) was an Indian-born British ornithologist who mostly worked in Zimbabwe.

== Biography ==
Brooke was born in India where his father served in the British Army. His academic career began at Rhodes University in Grahamstown where he took a bachelor's degree in theology. Later he pursued a career as a minor civil servant with a government department in Southern Rhodesia. His real interests, however, already lay with ornithology.

In 1972 he accepted an invitation to join the staff of the Durban Natural Science Museum, aware that he needed to obtain a higher degree, either a master's or a doctorate, to maintain the position. His submitted thesis was queried by a prominent United States ornithologist who offered to assist him in working on it. Brooke could have made the changes suggested but he was vehemently opposed to revising any part of his text, insisting that it was more than adequate.

He then left the Durban Museum and returned to Zimbabwe, where he worked with the Rhodesian Railways for a short time. His experiences with ornithology resulted in an invitation to join the staff of the Percy FitzPatrick Institute of African Ornithology at the University of Cape Town. Here he spent many fulfilling years of his productive life.

After a long illness he returned to Zimbabwe in 1996 where he died in the house of his brother. Richard Brooke never married.

== Scientific work ==
Brooke's early work with birds focussed the taxonomy of the swifts (Apodidae) of the Old World. Soon he acquired a solid background and became a world expert on the topic. Besides a wide range of papers he proposed new subspecies of the palm swifts, of mottled and African swift and introduced the genus Hydrochous.

Already 1971 Brooke served as a member of a panel of four specialists dealing with the birds of Zambia. Later, in particular after he joined the Percy FitzPatrick Institute, he widened his field of expertise, especially regarding the taxonomy and other biological aspects of various seabird groups. One of his major works is the "South African red data book – birds", for which he was awarded the Gill Memorial Medal.

One of his last papers reflect his findings on the possible difference of the South African pied avocet, which he thought was a distinct subspecies. However, due to the limited available material he did not give it a scientific name.
