= Kitti Thonglongya =

Thai ornithologist and mammalogist

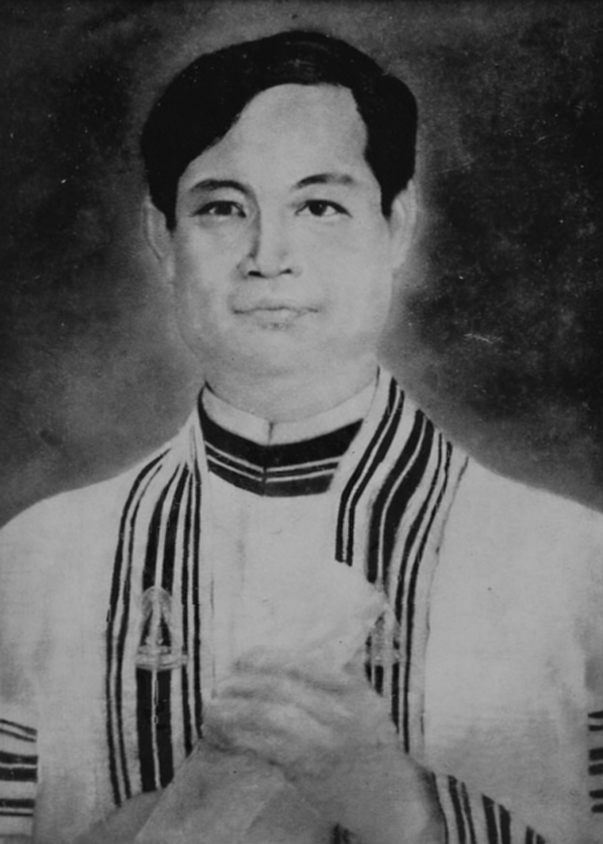
Kitti Thonglongya

Kitti Thonglongya (Thai: กิตติ ทองลงยา, October 6, 1928 – February 12, 1974) was an eminent Thai ornithologist and mammalogist. He is probably best known for two discoveries of endangered species.

== Life ==
Thonglongya was born in Bangkok and graduated with a degree in biology from the Chulalongkorn University in Bangkok in 1953. He then worked as a zoologist in a museum set up by the National science society and in 1956 he moved to the Thai Conservation Society. In 1965 he became the curator at the Thai National Reference Collection.

== Career ==
The Kitti's hog-nosed bat, Craseonycteris thonglongyai, the smallest species of bat and the smallest mammal in the world, was found by him in 1973. He died suddenly from a massive heart attack, so the formal description was written by his British colleague, John E. Hill, who named the species in honour of its discoverer. He went on to discover other new bat species, such as the extremely rare Salim Ali's fruit bat, Latidens salimalii, which had been misidentified in an Indian collection.

In the field of ornithology Kitti Thonglongya's best known discovery was of the white-eyed river martin, Pseudochelidon sirintarae, in 1969. This large swallow, whose scientific name commemorates Princess Sirindhorn Thepratanasuda, was found wintering at a lake in central Thailand, but its breeding grounds are unknown. It may now be extinct.

The first two Thai specimens of the Mekong wagtail, Motacilla samveasna, were collected by Kitti Thonglongya in December 1972.

He co-authored Bats from Thailand and Cambodia, and started the taxonomic study of bats of Thailand which appeared after his death as The Bats and Bat's Parasites of Thailand.
