= List of Paradoxosomatidae genera =

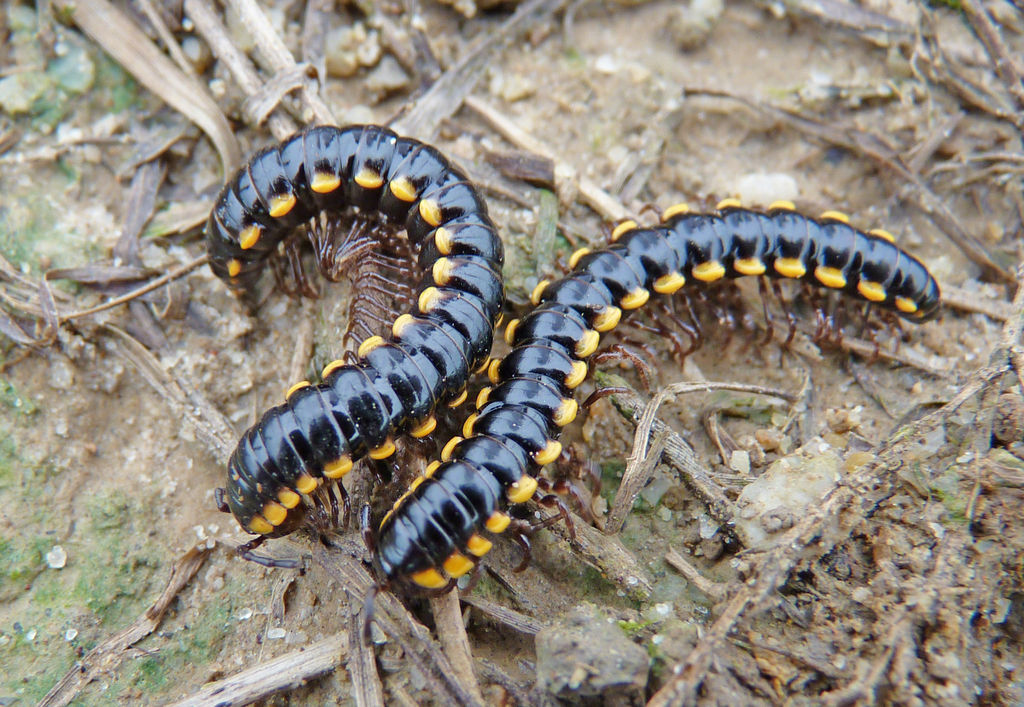
Anoplodesmus anthracinus

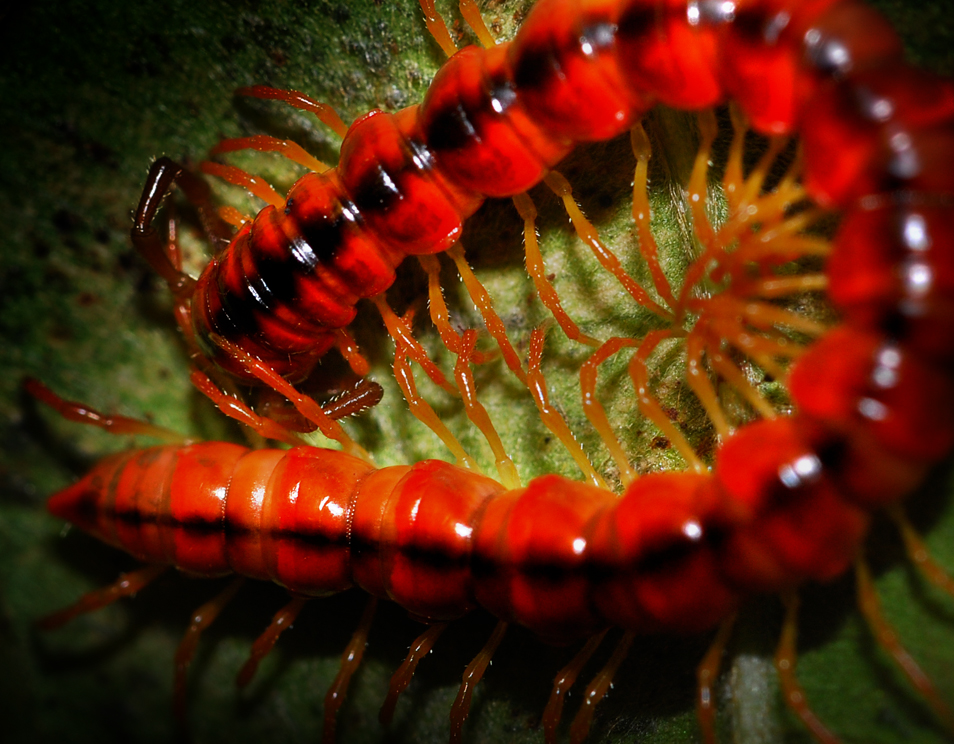
An unidentified species from Singapore

The Paradoxosomatidae is one of the largest families of millipedes, consisting of nearly 1,000 species in approximately 200 genera. The genera are divided into three subfamilies and 22 tribes. Most species (over 760) belong to the subfamily Paradoxosomatinae. This list includes all valid genera as of 2013, sorted by subfamily and tribe.

== Alogolykinae ==
=== Alogolykini ===
- Alogolykus
- Delarthrum
- Hirtodrepanum
- Orophosoma
- Pocockina
- Tetracentrosternus
- Touranella
- Yuennanina

=== Polydrepanini ===
- Armolites
- Curiosoma
- Dasypharkis
- Gyrodrepanum
- Hindomorpha
- Martensosoma
- Polydrepanum
- Singhalorthomorpha
- Telodrepanum
- Xiphidiogonus

== Australiosomatinae ==
=== Antichiropodini ===
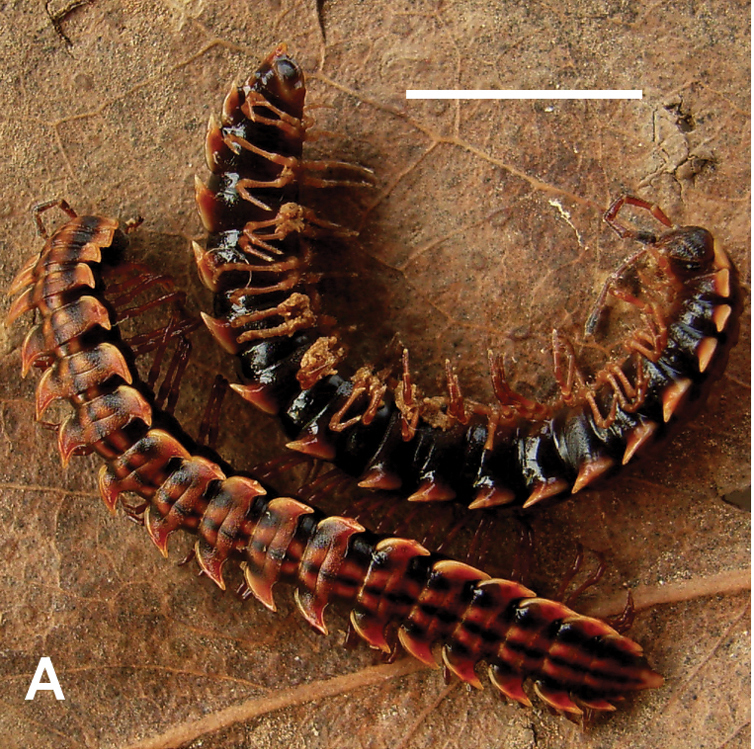
Brochopeltis mjoebergi, Queensland, Australia

- Aethalosoma
- Antichiropus
- Aulacoporus
- Australodesmus
- Borneochiropus
- Brochopeltis
- Dicranogonus
- Euphyodesmus
- Helicopodosoma
- Howeosoma
- Mjoebergodesmus
- Notodesmus
- Parwalesoma
- Pogonosternum
- Pseudostrongylosoma
- Solaenodolichopus
- Stygiochiropus
- Tridactylogonus
- Walesoma

=== Aschistodesmini ===
- Aschistodesmus
- Dendrogonopus
- Dorcadogonus
- Haplochiropus

=== Australiosomatini ===
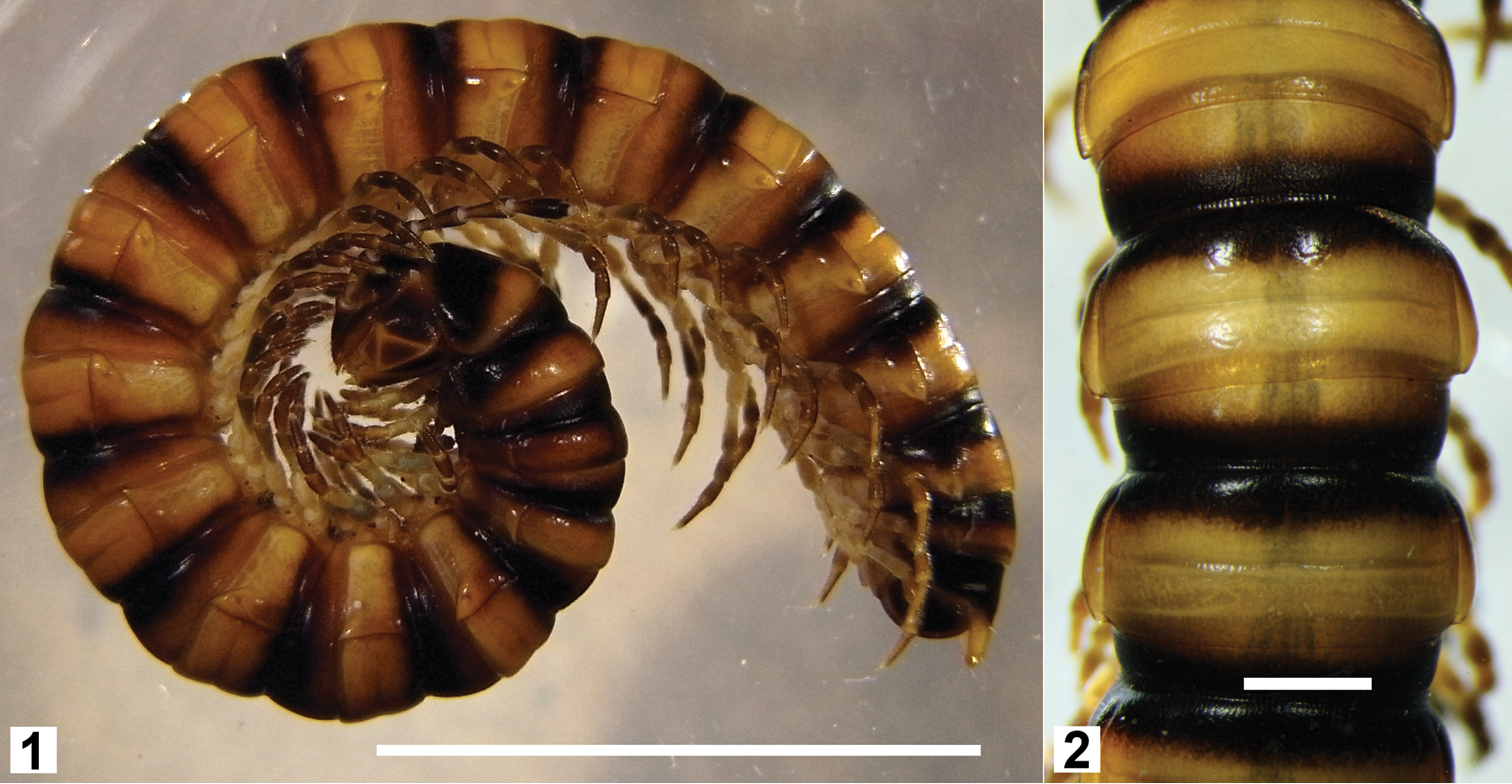
Hoplatessara luxuriosa, Australia

- Akamptogonus
- Archicladosoma
- Australiosoma
- Boreohesperus
- Cladethosoma
- Dicladosoma
- Dicladosomella
- Gigantowales
- Heterocladosoma
- Hoplatessara
- Hoplatria
- Isocladosoma
- Myallosoma
- Oncocladosoma
- Orocladosoma
- Paraustraliosoma
- Perittogonopus
- Phyllocladosoma
- Somethus
- Streptocladosoma

== Paradoxosomatinae ==
=== Catharosomatini ===
- Broelemannopus
- Catharosoma
- Gonodrepanoides
- Gonodrepanum
- Habrodesmoides
- Iulidesmus
- Mogyella
- Mogyosoma
- Montesecaria
- Ologonosoma
- Promestosoma
- Pseudogonodrepanum

=== Centrodesmini ===
- Centrodesmus
- Pleuroporodesmus

=== Chamberliniini ===
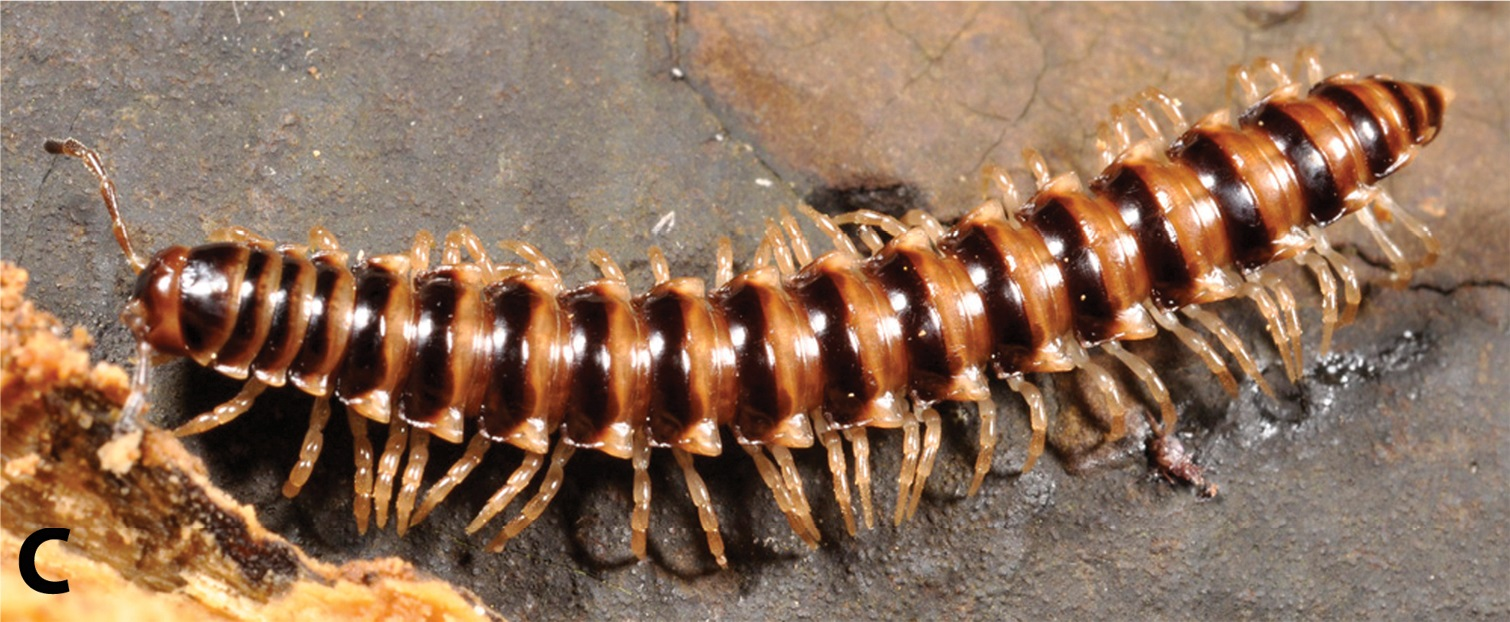
Chamberlinius uenoi, Japan

- Aponedyopus
- Chamberlinius
- Geniculodesmus
- Haplogonosoma
- Riukiupeltis
- Simplogonomorpha

=== Cnemodesmini ===
- Aklerobunus
- Allochresimus
- Anaclastopus
- Campsogon
- Cnemodesmella
- Cnemodesmina
- Cnemodesmus
- Dysmathogonus
- Ectodesmus
- Lundasoma
- Nasmodesosoma
- Phaeodesmus
- Podochresimus
- Pyragrogonus

=== Eroonsomatini ===
- Eroonsoma
- Metonomastus

=== Eustrongylosomatini ===
- Astromontosoma
- Diglossosternoides
- Eustrongylosoma
- Nothrosoma
- Perittotresis
- Selminosoma
- Silvattia

=== Eviulisomatini ===
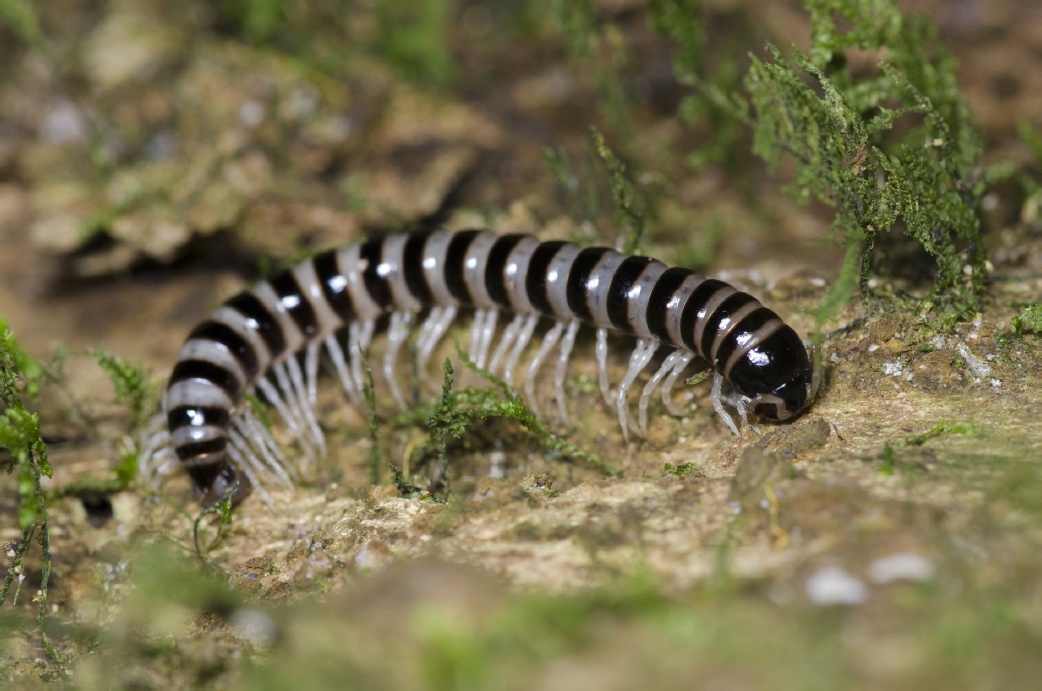
Eviulisoma zebra, Tanzania

- Boreviulisoma
- Eoseviulisoma
- Eviulisoma
- Onciurosoma
- Scolodesmus
- Wubidesmus

=== Graphisternini ===
- Ergethus
- Graphisternum

=== Nedyopodini ===
- Nedyopus

=== Orthomorphini ===
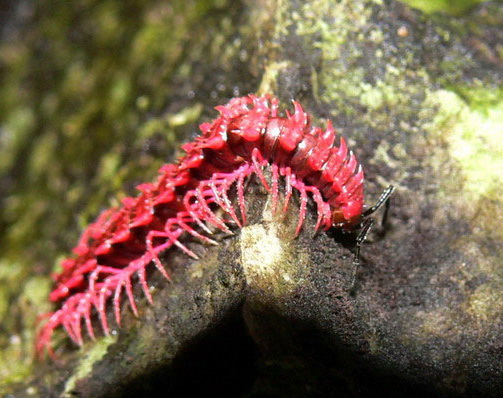
Desmoxytes purpurosea, Thailand

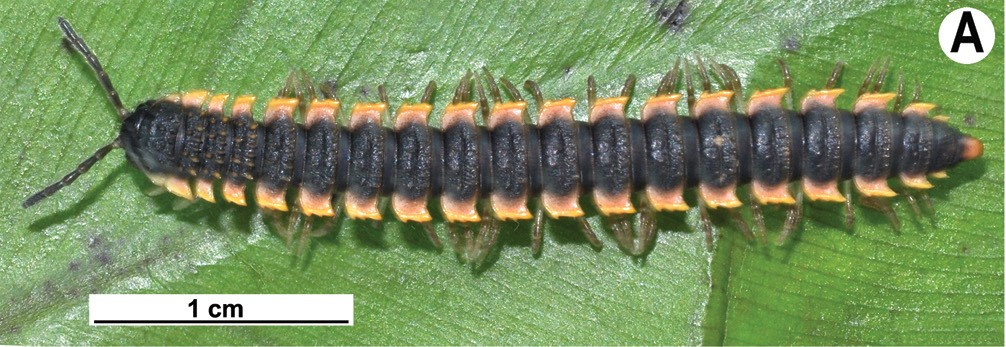
Orthomorpha tuberculifera, Thailand

- Antheromorpha
- Asiomorpha
- Carinorthomorpha
- Cleptomorpha
- Dajakina
- Desmoxytes
- Diglossosternum
- Eudasypeltis
- Gigantomorpha
- Luzonomorpha
- Malayorthomorpha
- Nepalomorpha
- Nesorthomorpha
- Orangutana
- Orthomorpha
- Orthomorphoides
- Parorthomorpha
- Piccola
- Sapamorpha
- Shelleyomorpha
- Sinomorpha
- Topalosoma

=== Paradoxosomatini ===
- Ciliciosoma
- Enghoffosoma
- Haplogonomorpha
- Lohmanderodesmus
- Stosatea
- Strongylosoma
- Substrongylosoma
- Tetrarthrosoma

=== Sulciferini ===
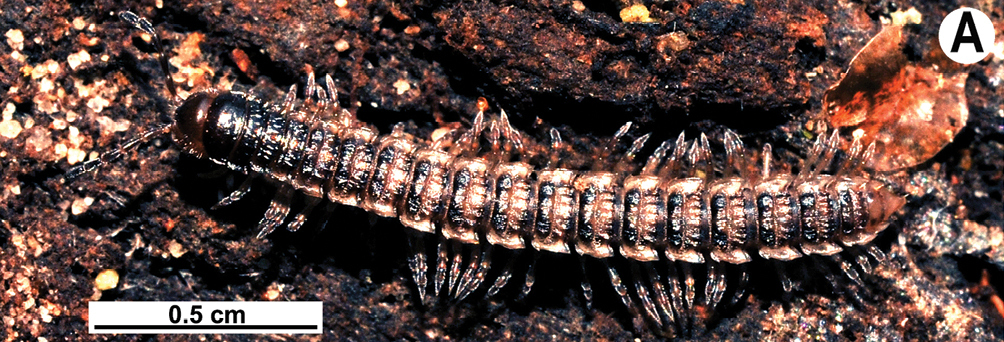
Tylopus corrugatus, Thailand

- Annamina
- Anoplodesmus
- Belousoviella
- Cawjeekelia
- Chapanella
- Chondromorpha
- Echinopeltis
- Gonobelus
- Harpagomorpha
- Hedinomorpha
- Hoffmanina
- Inversispina
- Kaschmiriosoma
- Kronopolites
- Mandarinopus
- Margaritosoma
- Oranmorpha
- Orthomorphella
- Oxidus
- Parchondromorpha
- Sellanucheza
- Sichotanus
- Sigipinius
- Tylopus
- Vietnamorpha
- Wulingina

=== Sundaninini ===
- Arthrogonopus
- Batakina
- Borneonina
- Chinomorpha
- Kalimantanina
- Opisthodolichopus
- Pseudosundanina
- Sumatreonina
- Sundanina
- Sundaninella

=== Tectoporini ===
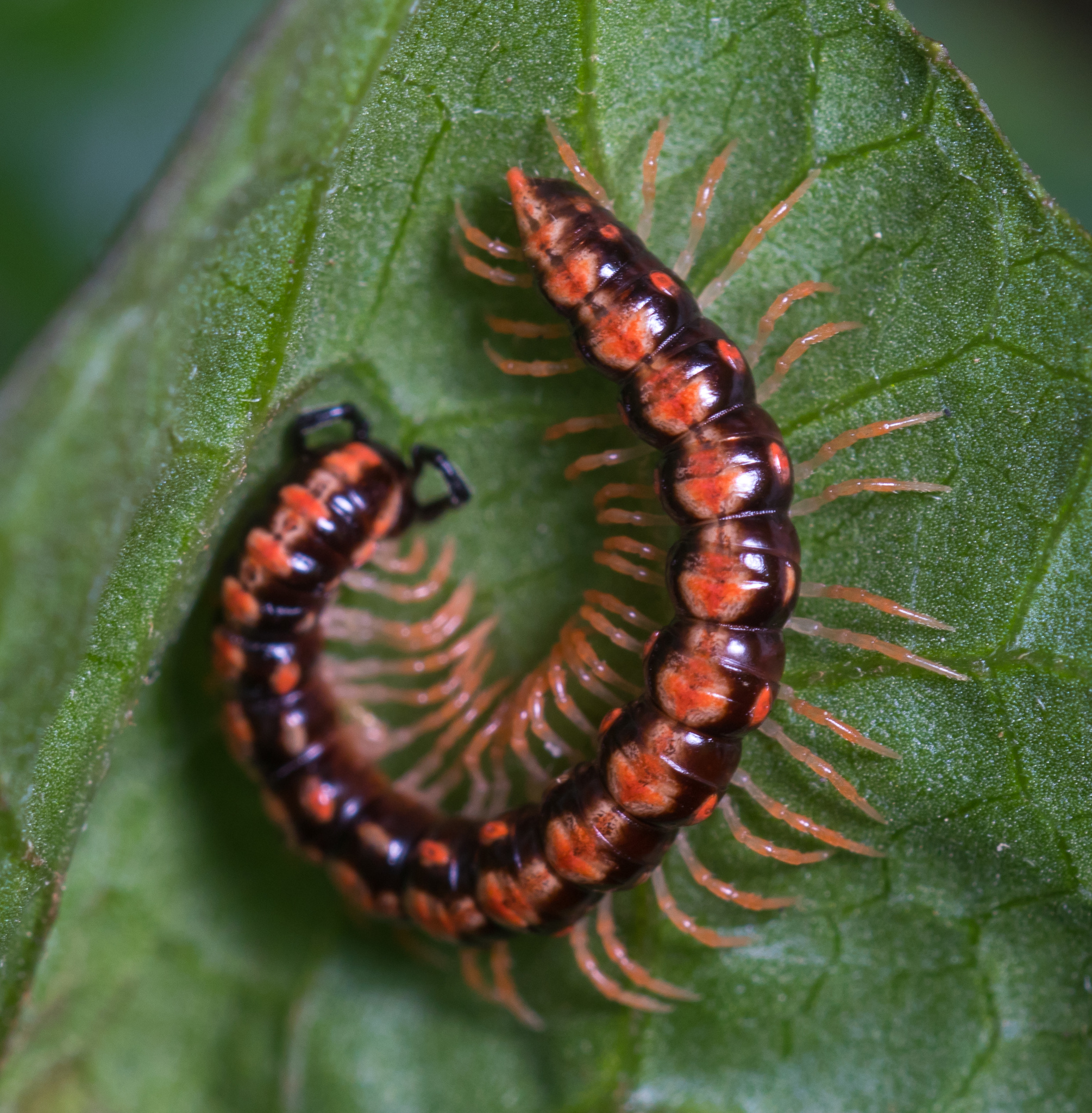
Helicorthomorpha holstii

- Caloma
- Helicorthomorpha
- Leiozonius
- Paternostrana
- Tectoporus

=== Tonkinosomatini ===
- Tonkinosoma

=== Xanthodesmini ===
- Habrodesmus
- Laterogonopus
- Streptogonopus
- Xanthodesmus

== Uncertain tribal position ==
- Antichirogonus
- Atropisoma
- Desmoxytoides
- Habrodesmella
- Laviusoma
- Polylobosoma
- Tholerosoma
- Trogodesmus
