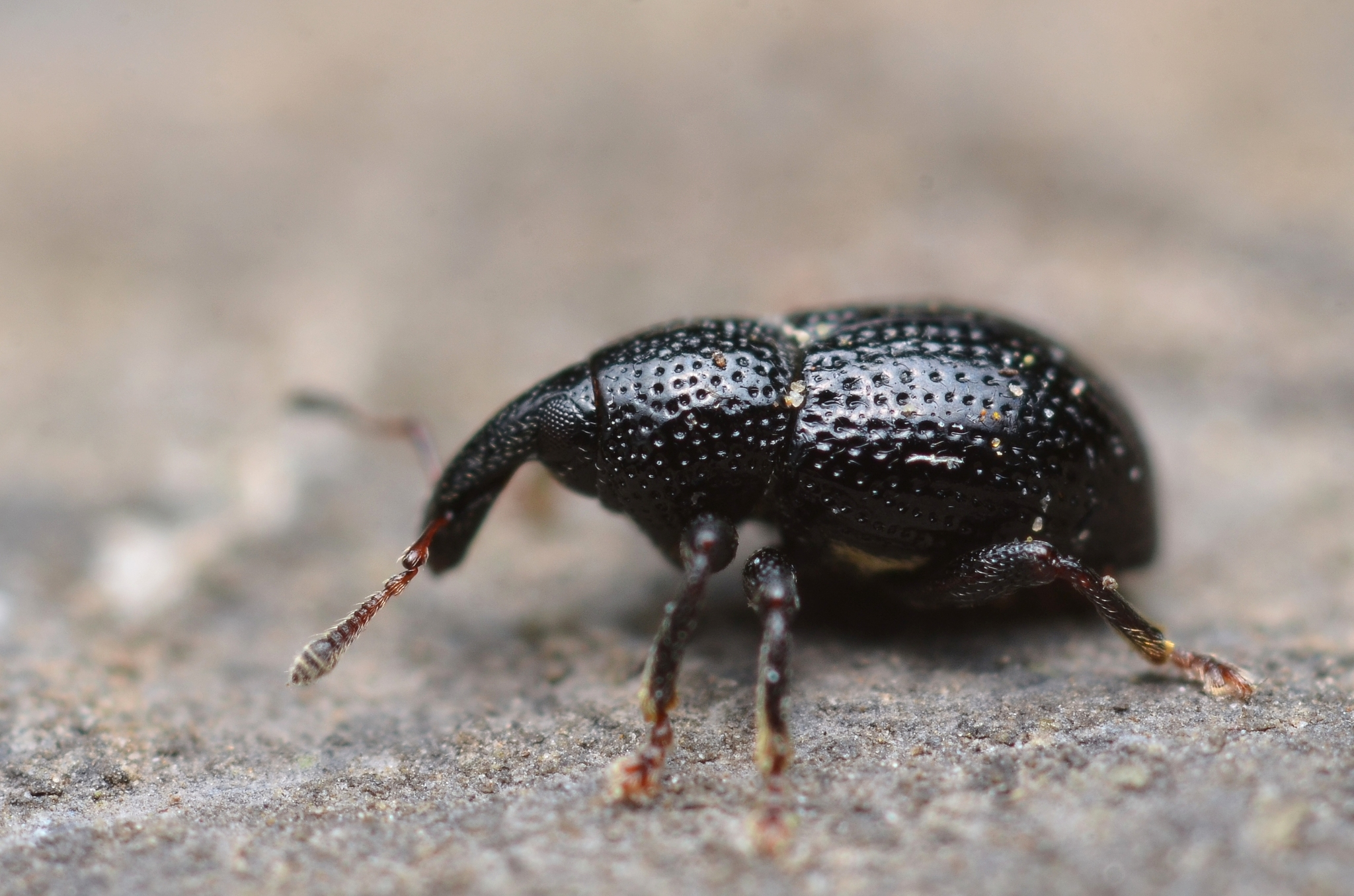
- Leiosoma deflexum, Belgium

Scientific classification
- Domain: Eukaryota
- Kingdom: Animalia
- Phylum: Arthropoda
- Class: Insecta
- Order: Coleoptera
- Suborder: Polyphaga
- Infraorder: Cucujiformia
- Family: Curculionidae
- Genus: Leiosoma; J.F.Stephens, 1829

Synonyms
- Leiosomus Schoenherr 1842; Liosoma Agassiz 1846; Liosomus Agassiz 1846; Liosomus Gistel 1856; Liosoma Gemminger & Harold 1871; Xenomicrus Wollaston 1864

= Leiosoma =

Genus of beetles

Several other genera were invalidly named Leiosoma. The mite genus of Nicolet (1855) is now Liacarus. The echinoid genus of Cotteau (1860) is now Trochalosoma. The lepidopteran genus of Felder & Rogenhofer (1874) is now Erocha. The millipede genus of Silvestri (1897) is now Catharosoma.

Leiosoma is a genus of weevils. It can be found in mountain-forest and alpine habitats in the western Palearctic realm. These weevils feed on plants of the families Ranunculaceae and Violaceae.

== Species ==
There are 31 species of Leiosoma listed in Catalogue of Life and GBIF.

- Leiosoma apenninicola Hoffmann, 1961
- Leiosoma apionides (Wollaston, 1864)
- Leiosoma bedeli K.Daniel, 1906
- Leiosoma bosnicum K.Daniel, 1906
- Leiosoma concinnum Boheman, 1842
- Leiosoma cribrum (Gyllenhal, 1834)
- Leiosoma cyanopterum Redtenbacher, 1849
- Leiosoma deflexum Redtenbacher, L., 1858
- Leiosoma devillei Bedel, 1912
- Leiosoma formaneki Lokay, 1908
- Leiosoma galiberti Tempère, 1979
- Leiosoma kirschi Gredler, 1866
- Leiosoma klebsi (Legalov, 2016)
- Leiosoma lethierryi C.Brisout de Barneville, 1863
- Leiosoma muscorum Ch.Brisout, 1863
- Leiosoma nicolasi Tempère, 1979
- Leiosoma oblongulum Boheman, 1842
- Leiosoma pandellei Ch.Brisout, 1867
- Leiosoma pseudopyrenaeum Tempère, 1979
- Leiosoma punctata Stephens, 1829
- Leiosoma punctatum Stephens, J.F., 1831
- Leiosoma reitteri
- Leiosoma reynosae Ch.Brisout, 1866
- Leiosoma robustum Seidlitz, 1867
- Leiosoma rosea Victor, 1839
- Leiosoma rufipes C.Brisout de Barneville, 1863
- Leiosoma scrobifer Rottenberg, 1871
- Leiosoma stierlini Tournier, 1860
- Leiosoma subcoriaceum K.Daniel, 1906
- Leiosoma talamellii Pedroni, 2010
- Leiosoma troglodytes Rye, 1873
