= Octoglena anura =

Scientific classification
- Kingdom: Animalia
- Phylum: Arthropoda
- Subphylum: Myriapoda
- Class: Diplopoda
- Order: Polyzoniida
- Family: Hirudisomatidae
- Genus: Octoglena
- Species: O. anura

Binomial name
- Octoglena anura (Cook, 1904)

Species of millipede

Octoglena anura is a species of millipede in the family Hirudisomatidae. It is found in North America.
