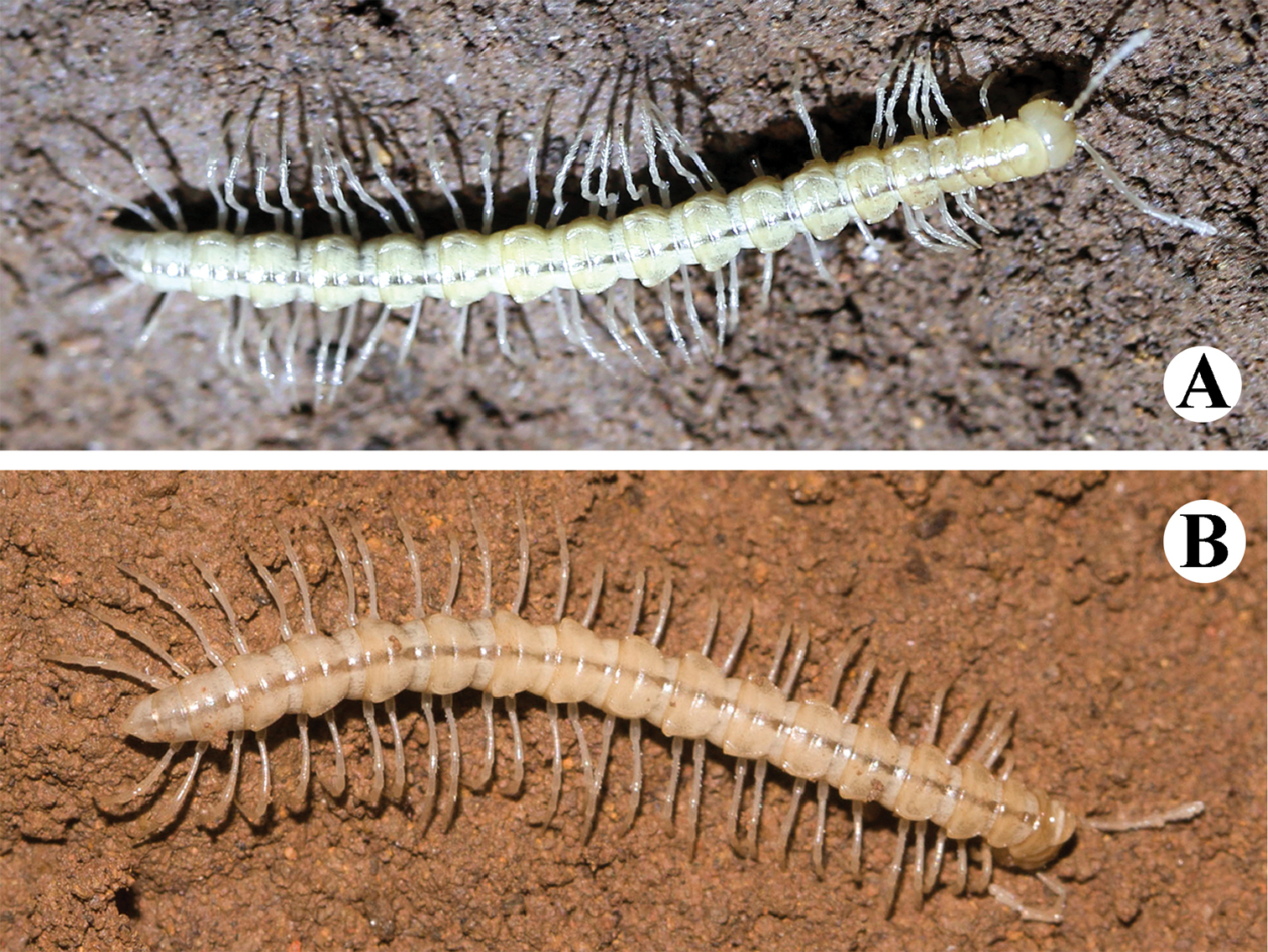
- Tonkinosoma tiani from a cave in Anlong, China

Scientific classification
- Kingdom: Animalia
- Phylum: Arthropoda
- Subphylum: Myriapoda
- Class: Diplopoda
- Order: Polydesmida
- Family: Paradoxosomatidae
- Genus: Tonkinosoma
- Species: T. tiani

Binomial name
- Tonkinosoma tiani Liu & Golovatch, 2018

= Tonkinosoma tiani =

Species of millipede

Tonkinosoma tiani is a species of millipede belonging to the family Paradoxosomatidae. It is found from caves in southern China.

== Etymology ==
The specific name tiani is in honor of Prof. Mingyi Tian, one of collector from South China Agricultural University.

== Description ==
Body length is 25–27 mm in both sexes. In the head, frons densely pilose and vertex smooth. Antennae slender and long. Body uniformly dark to pale yellow. Body has 20 segments. Epiproct tip is truncated, with four spinnerets. Legs long and slender.
