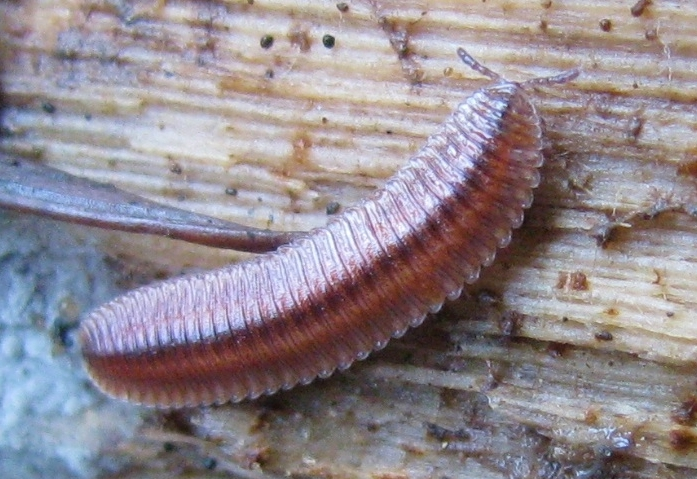
- Octoglena bivirgata

Scientific classification
- Domain: Eukaryota
- Kingdom: Animalia
- Phylum: Arthropoda
- Subphylum: Myriapoda
- Class: Diplopoda
- Order: Polyzoniida
- Family: Hirudisomatidae; Silvestri, 1896

= Hirudisomatidae =

Family of millipedes

Hirudisomatidae is a family of colobognathan millipedes in the order Polyzoniida. The approximately 20 species occur from Spain to the Himalayas in Eurasia, Japan, and in North America from southwest Canada to central Mexico.

== Genera ==
- Catharosoma
- Hirudisoma
- Hypozonium
- Mexiconium
- Nepalozonium
- Octoglena
- Orsiboe
