= Akamptogonus novarae =

Scientific classification
- Kingdom: Animalia
- Phylum: Arthropoda
- Subphylum: Myriapoda
- Class: Diplopoda
- Order: Polydesmida
- Family: Paradoxosomatidae
- Genus: Akamptogonus
- Species: A. novarae

Binomial name
- Akamptogonus novarae (Humbert & DeSaussure, 1869)

Species of millipede

Akamptogonus novarae is a species of flat-backed millipede in the family Paradoxosomatidae. It can be found in Australia, North America, and Oceania.
