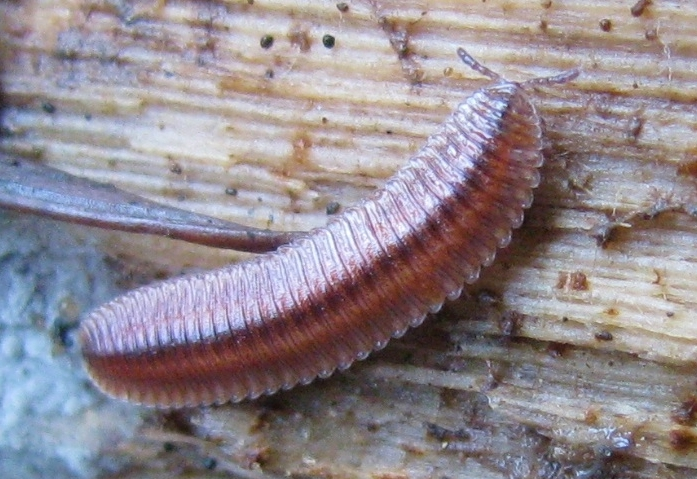

Scientific classification
- Domain: Eukaryota
- Kingdom: Animalia
- Phylum: Arthropoda
- Subphylum: Myriapoda
- Class: Diplopoda
- Order: Polyzoniida
- Family: Hirudisomatidae
- Genus: Octoglena
- Species: O. bivirgata

Binomial name
- Octoglena bivirgata Wood, 1864

= Octoglena bivirgata =

Species of millipede

Octoglena bivirgata is a species of millipede in the family Hirudisomatidae. It is found in North America.
