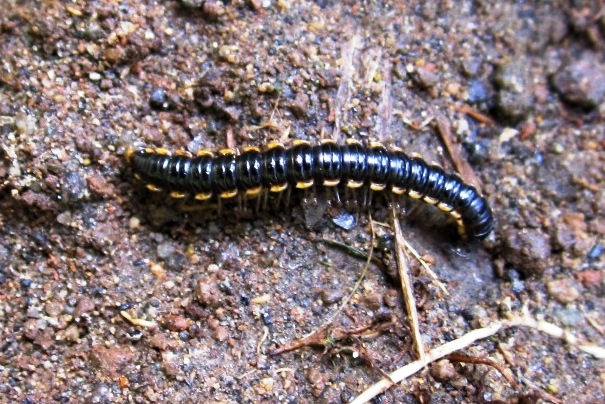

Scientific classification
- Kingdom: Animalia
- Phylum: Arthropoda
- Subphylum: Myriapoda
- Class: Diplopoda
- Order: Polydesmida
- Family: Paradoxosomatidae
- Genus: Orthomorpha
- Species: O. coarctata

Binomial name
- Orthomorpha coarctata (De Saussure, 1860)

Synonyms
- Polydesmus coarctatus DeSaussure, 1860; Strongylosoma poeyi Bollman, 1887; Strongylosoma coarctatum Pocock, 1894; Orthomorpha coarctata Attems, 1937; Asiomorpha coarctata Verhoeff, 1939

= Orthomorpha coarctata =

Species of millipede

Orthomorpha coarctata, the long-flange millipede, is a widely introduced species of Polydesmidan millipede of the family Paradoxosomatidae. It is presumed native to Southeast Asia but due to transport by humans occurs in tropical and sub-tropical areas throughout the world, including the Hawaiian Islands, the West Indies, Gulf Coast of North America, and the Galápagos Islands.

== Description ==
Males range from 14.5 to 20.5 mm in length and 1.5 to 2.7 mm wide while females are somewhat larger ranging from 16.5 to 27.5 mm long, and 1.6–3.2 mm wide. O. coarctata can be distinguished from Oxidus gracilis, another widely introduced Asian millipede, by having proportionally longer and pointier paranota (lateral keels) on mid-body segments and longer gonopods (male reproductive appendages).

O. coarctata is unique within the genus Orthomorpha in that the gonopods have a single, simple tip, while other species have two or three lobes. This distinction has led some authors to place O. coarctata in a separate, monotypic genus, Asiomorpha.

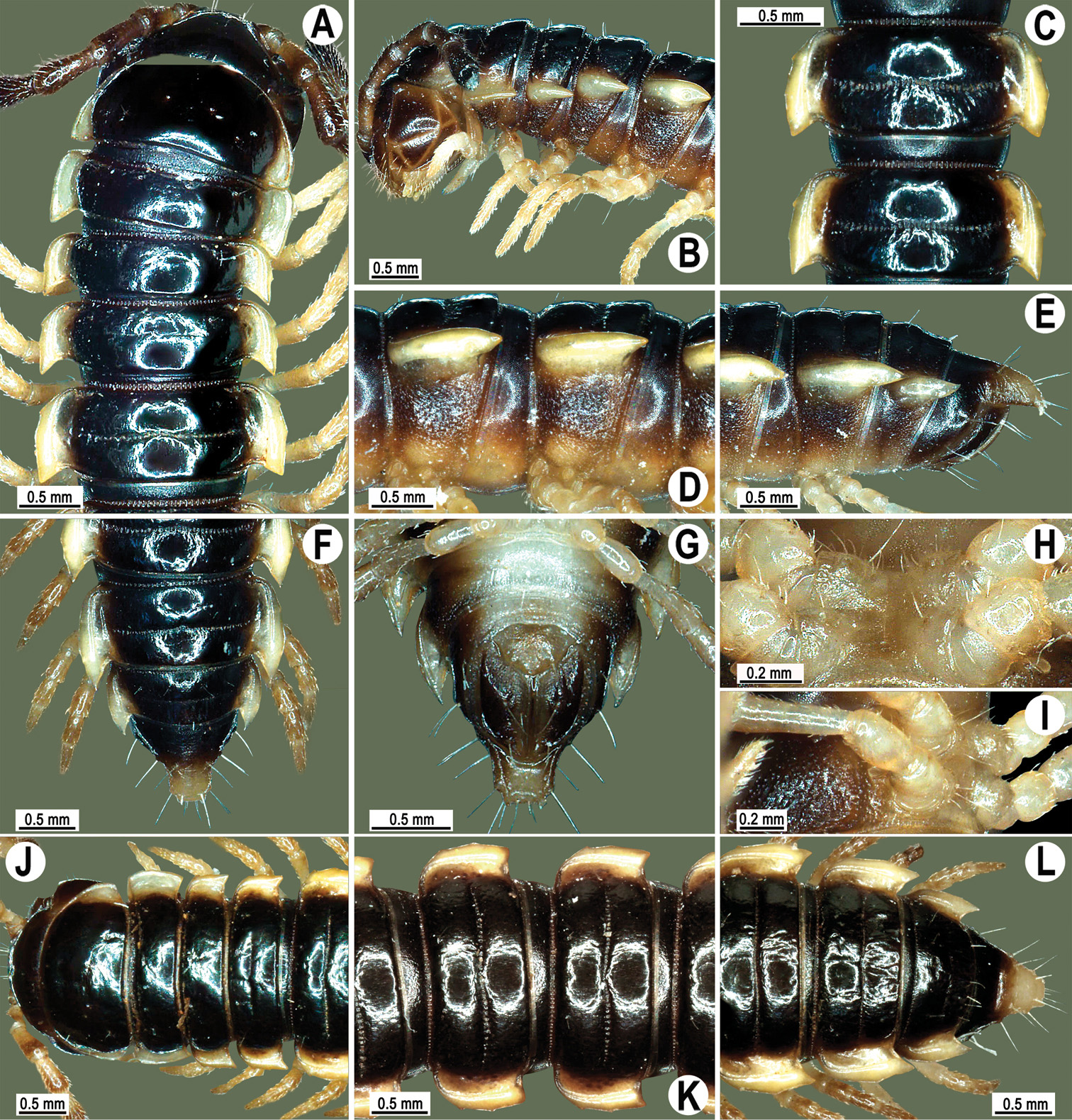
Anatomy of an individual collected in Thailand

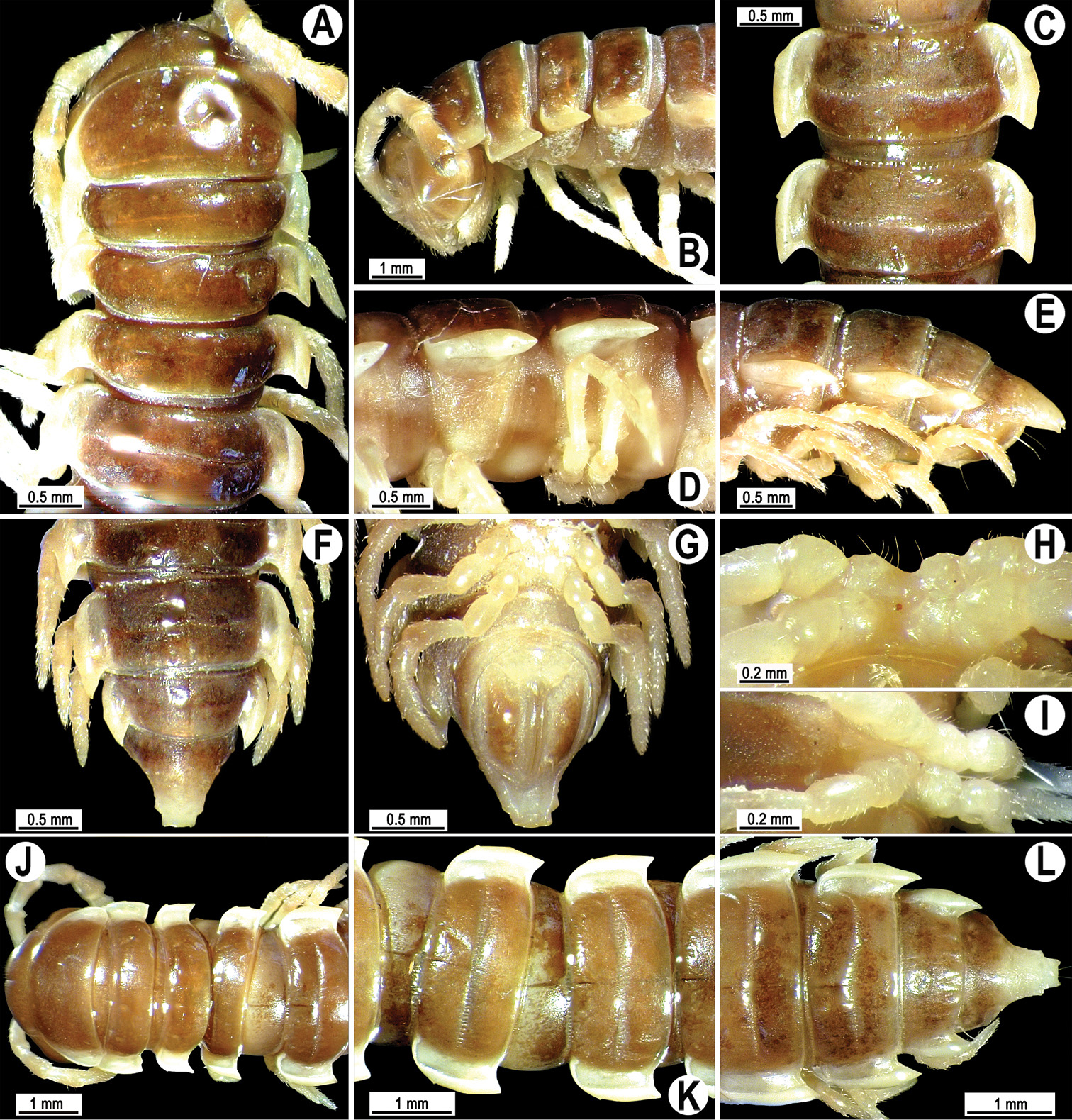
Anatomy of male (A-I) and female (J-L)

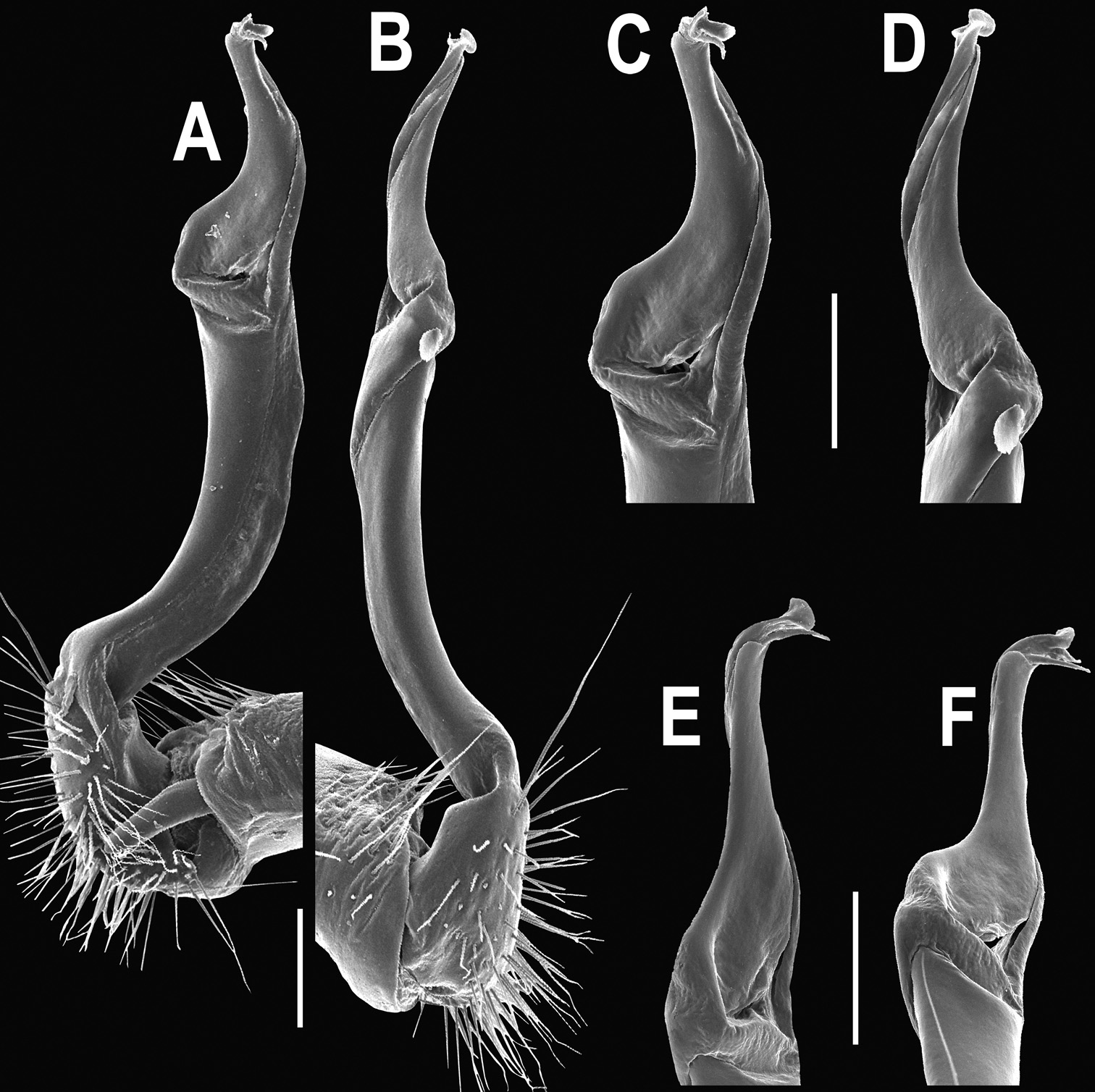
Gonopods
