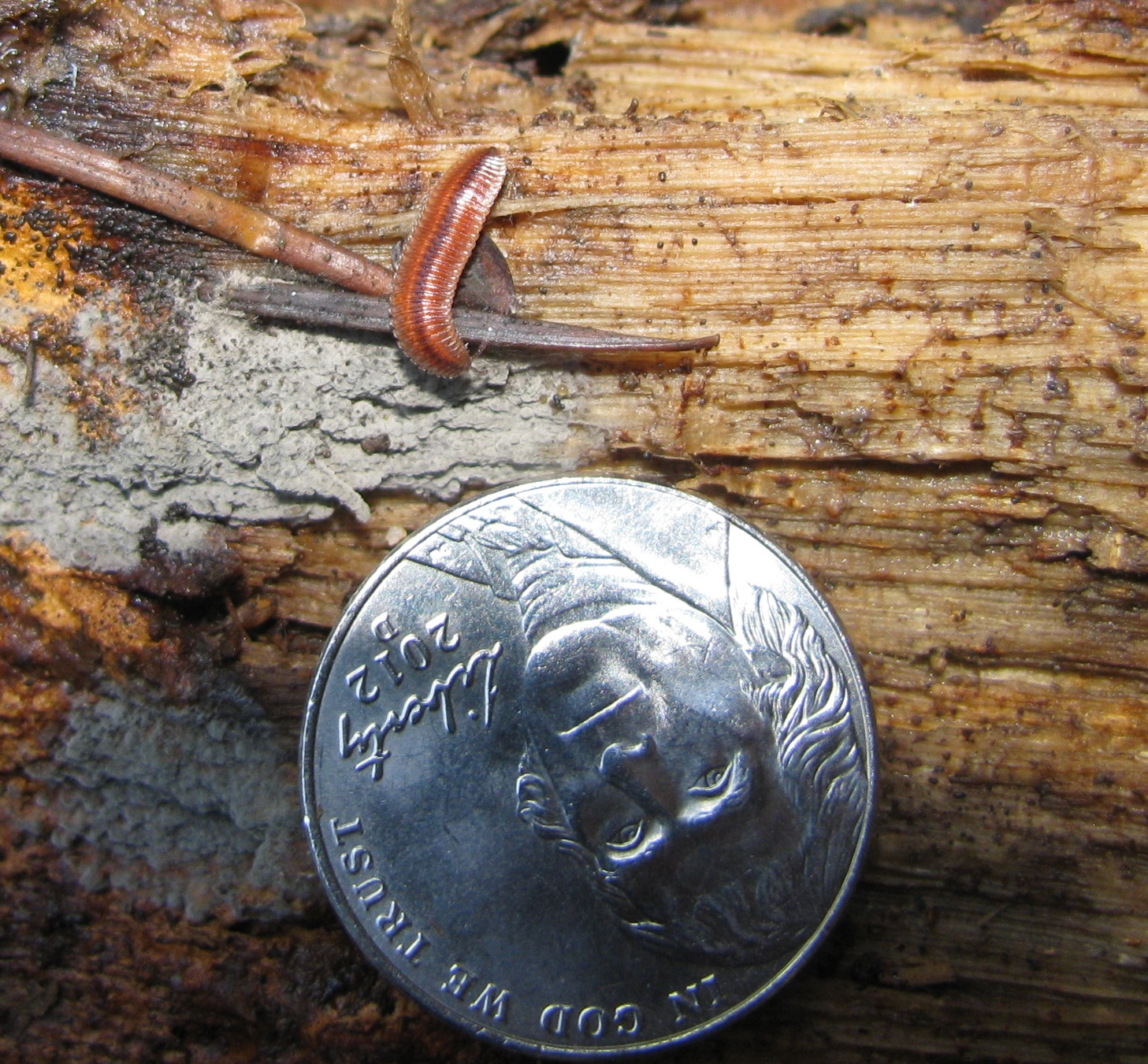
- Octoglena bivirgata

Scientific classification
- Domain: Eukaryota
- Kingdom: Animalia
- Phylum: Arthropoda
- Subphylum: Myriapoda
- Class: Diplopoda
- Order: Polyzoniida
- Family: Hirudisomatidae
- Genus: Octoglena; Wood, 1864

= Octoglena =

Genus of millipedes

Octoglena is a genus of millipedes in the family Hirudisomatidae. There are about seven described species in Octoglena.

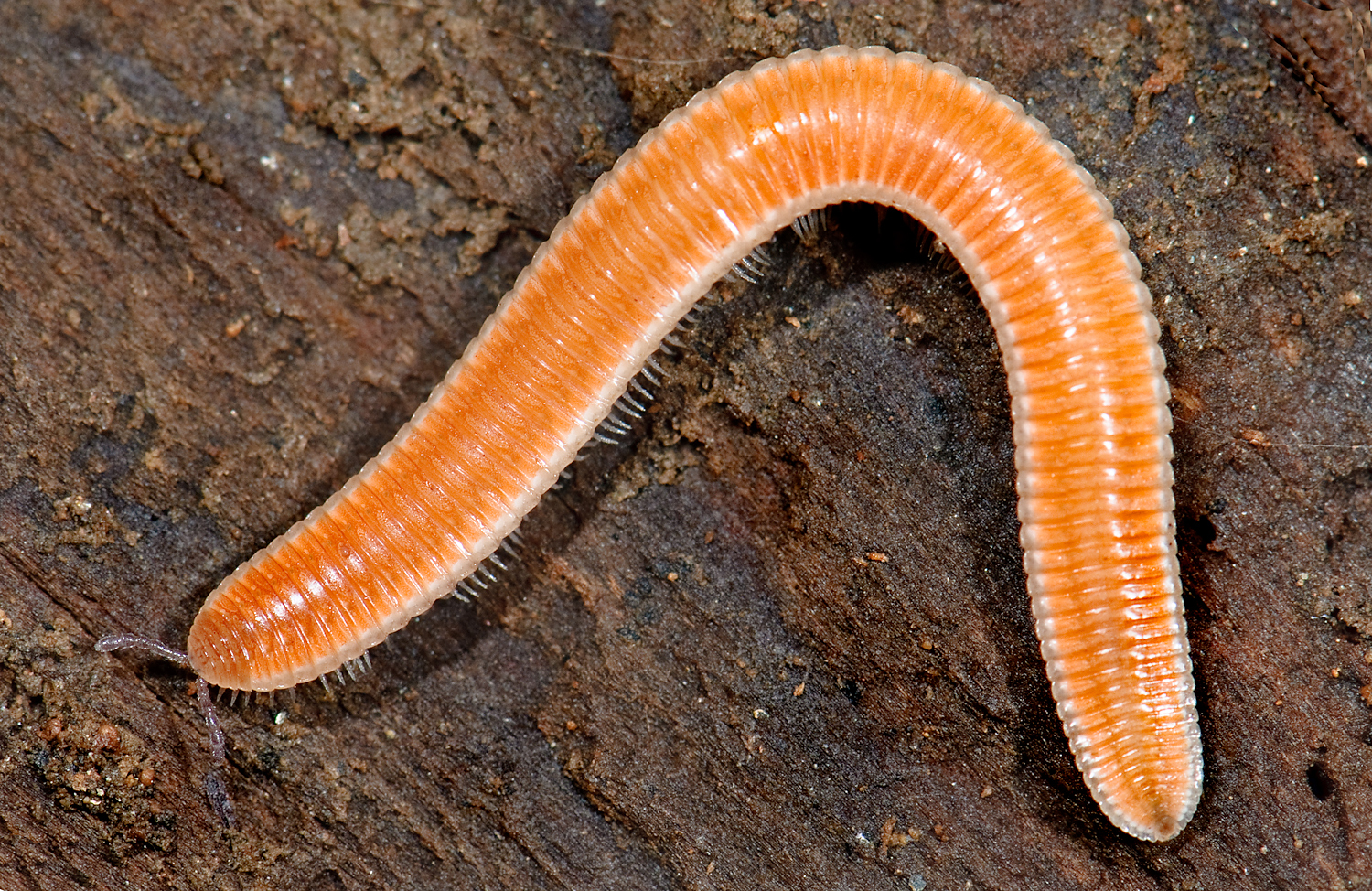
Octoglena sierra

== Species ==
These seven species belong to the genus Octoglena:

- Octoglena anura (Cook, 1904)
- Octoglena bivirgata Wood, 1864
- Octoglena bivirgatum Wood, 1864
- Octoglena claraqua
- Octoglena gracilipes (Loomis, 1971)
- Octoglena prolata Shelley, 1996
- Octoglena sierra Shelley, 1996
