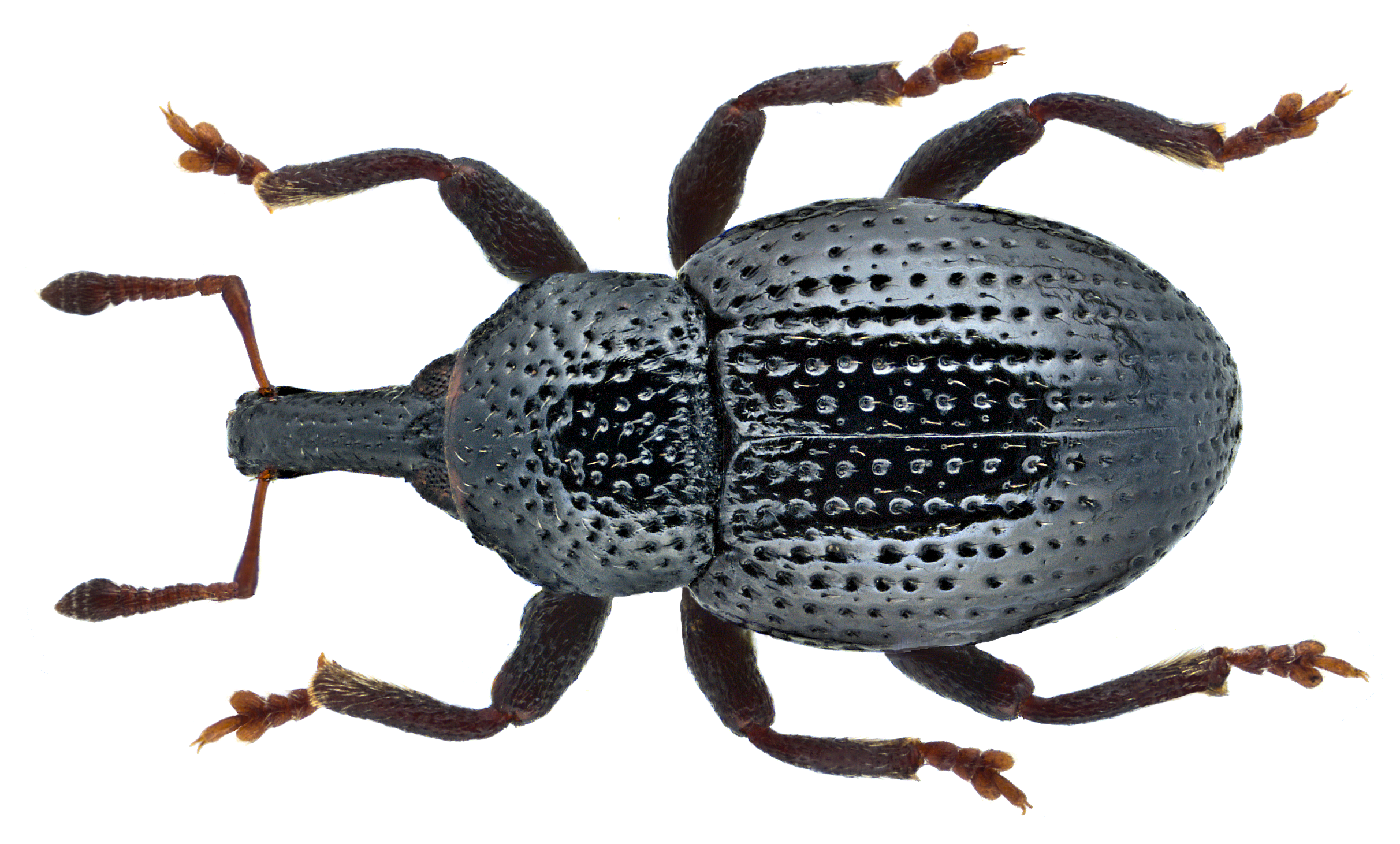
- Leiosoma deflexum 2,6 mm (2,5 to 2,8 mm)

Scientific classification
- Kingdom: Animalia
- Phylum: Arthropoda
- Clade: Pancrustacea
- Class: Insecta
- Order: Coleoptera
- Suborder: Polyphaga
- Infraorder: Cucujiformia
- Superfamily: Curculionoidea
- Family: Curculionidae
- Genus: Leiosoma
- Species: L. deflexum

Binomial name
- Leiosoma deflexum (Panzer, 1795)

= Leiosoma deflexum =

Species of beetle

Leiosoma deflexum is a species of weevil native to Europe.
