= Orthomorpha mikrotropis =

Scientific classification
- Kingdom: Animalia
- Phylum: Arthropoda
- Subphylum: Myriapoda
- Class: Diplopoda
- Order: Polydesmida
- Family: Paradoxosomatidae
- Genus: Orthomorpha
- Species: O. mikrotropis

Binomial name
- Orthomorpha mikrotropis Attems, 1898

Species of millipede

Orthomorpha mikrotropis, is a species of millipede in the family Paradoxosomatidae. It is endemic to Sri Lanka.
