= Akamptogonus =

Scientific classification
- Kingdom: Animalia
- Phylum: Arthropoda
- Subphylum: Myriapoda
- Class: Diplopoda
- Order: Polydesmida
- Family: Paradoxosomatidae
- Genus: Akamptogonus; Attems, 1914

Genus of millipedes

Akamptogonus is a genus of flat-backed millipedes in the family Paradoxosomatidae. There are about 11 described species in Akamptogonus.

== Species ==
These 11 species belong to the genus Akamptogonus:

- Akamptogonus austerus Attems, 1932
- Akamptogonus australianus (Chamberlin, 1920)
- Akamptogonus beauforti Attems, 1915
- Akamptogonus caragoon (Rowe & Sierwald, 2006)
- Akamptogonus continuus Attems, 1914
- Akamptogonus novarae (Humbert & DeSaussure, 1869)
- Akamptogonus rotornanus (Chamberlin, 1920)
- Akamptogonus sentaniensis Attems, 1917
- Akamptogonus signatus (Attems, 1897)
- Akamptogonus triaina (Attems, 1911)
- Akamptogonus vinctus Attems, 1933
