= Parchondromorpha =

Scientific classification
- Domain: Eukaryota
- Kingdom: Animalia
- Phylum: Arthropoda
- Subphylum: Myriapoda
- Class: Diplopoda
- Order: Polydesmida
- Family: Paradoxosomatidae
- Genus: Parchondromorpha; Golovatch, 1984

Genus of millipedes

Parchondromorpha is a genus of millipedes belonging to the family Paradoxosomatidae.

The genus has cosmopolitan distribution. The species of this genus are found in Europe and Northern America.

Species:

- Parchondromorpha coonoorensis (Carl, 1932)
- Parchondromorpha indica Golovatch, 1984
- Parchondromorpha similis Golovatch, 1984
