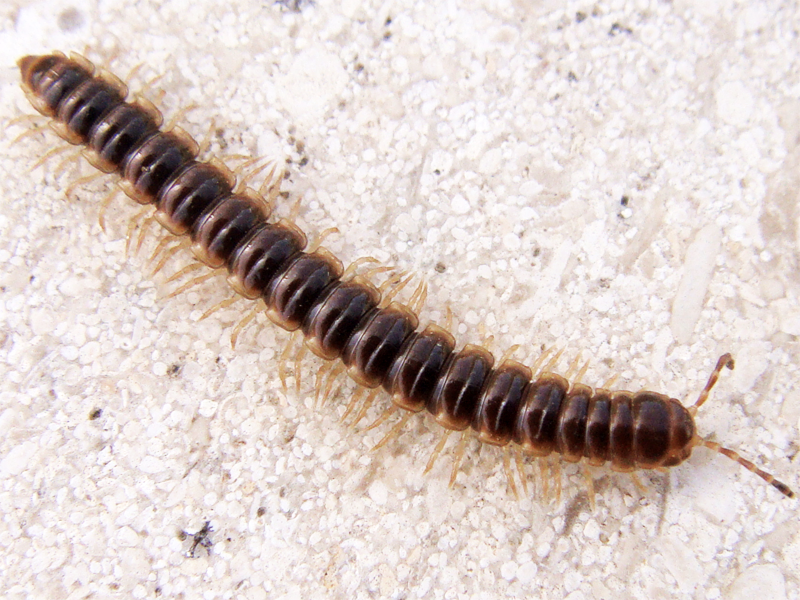

Conservation status
- Secure (NatureServe)

Scientific classification
- Kingdom: Animalia
- Phylum: Arthropoda
- Subphylum: Myriapoda
- Class: Diplopoda
- Order: Polydesmida
- Family: Paradoxosomatidae
- Genus: Oxidus
- Species: O. gracilis

Binomial name
- Oxidus gracilis (C. L. Koch, 1847)

Synonyms
- Fontaria gracilis C. L. Koch,1847; Paradesmus dasys Bollman, 1887; Orthomorpha gracilis Bollman, 1893; Kepolydesmus sontus Chamberlin, 1910; Oxidus gracilis Cook, 1911

= Greenhouse millipede =

Oxidus gracilis

Species of millipede

The greenhouse millipede (Oxidus gracilis), also known as the hothouse millipede, short-flange millipede, or garden millipede, is a species of millipede in the family Paradoxosomatidae that has been widely introduced around the world, and is sometimes a pest in greenhouses.

== Description ==
The greenhouse millipede is also referred to as the flat-back millipede as it possesses a flat body and a hard exterior skeleton.

They are brown in color with pale cream-colored legs and paranota (lateral "keels" extending from each segment). Greenhouse millipedes achieve lengths of 18 to 23 mm (0.71 to 0.91 in) as adults, and widths from 2 to 2.5 mm (0.079 to 0.098 in). When fully grown it will have 60 legs and about 15 body segments. The dorsal section of each segment has a transverse groove, a trait found in most paradoxosomatids. The greenhouse millipede is also blind and without eyes and as a result, it moves through its habitat using its antennae as its sensory organ.

The greenhouse millipede got its name from the fact that it survives optimally in greenhouses. They are normally found in Asia, but it can also be found in the Americas and Europe as an invasive species.

== Reproduction ==
The reproductive process of millipedes in general is not an easy subject to study; thus, specifics of greenhouse millipede reproduction have been a challenge for researchers to gather. It is known that this specific millipede species reproduces sexually. The anatomical structures at play during this process are interestingly specific to the greenhouse millipede. When the female millipede is 6–7 months of age, she will reach physical maturity and will be ready to mate. Male millipedes utilize the "lock and key" method of fertilization. During this process, the males have specialized legs that become sexual appendages to help with bodily stability during mating. These are typically the legs around the seventh segment. This helps increase the effectiveness of the mating action. These specific legs are called gonopods and they help clasp and hold the female in place while the male injects his sperm into the female.

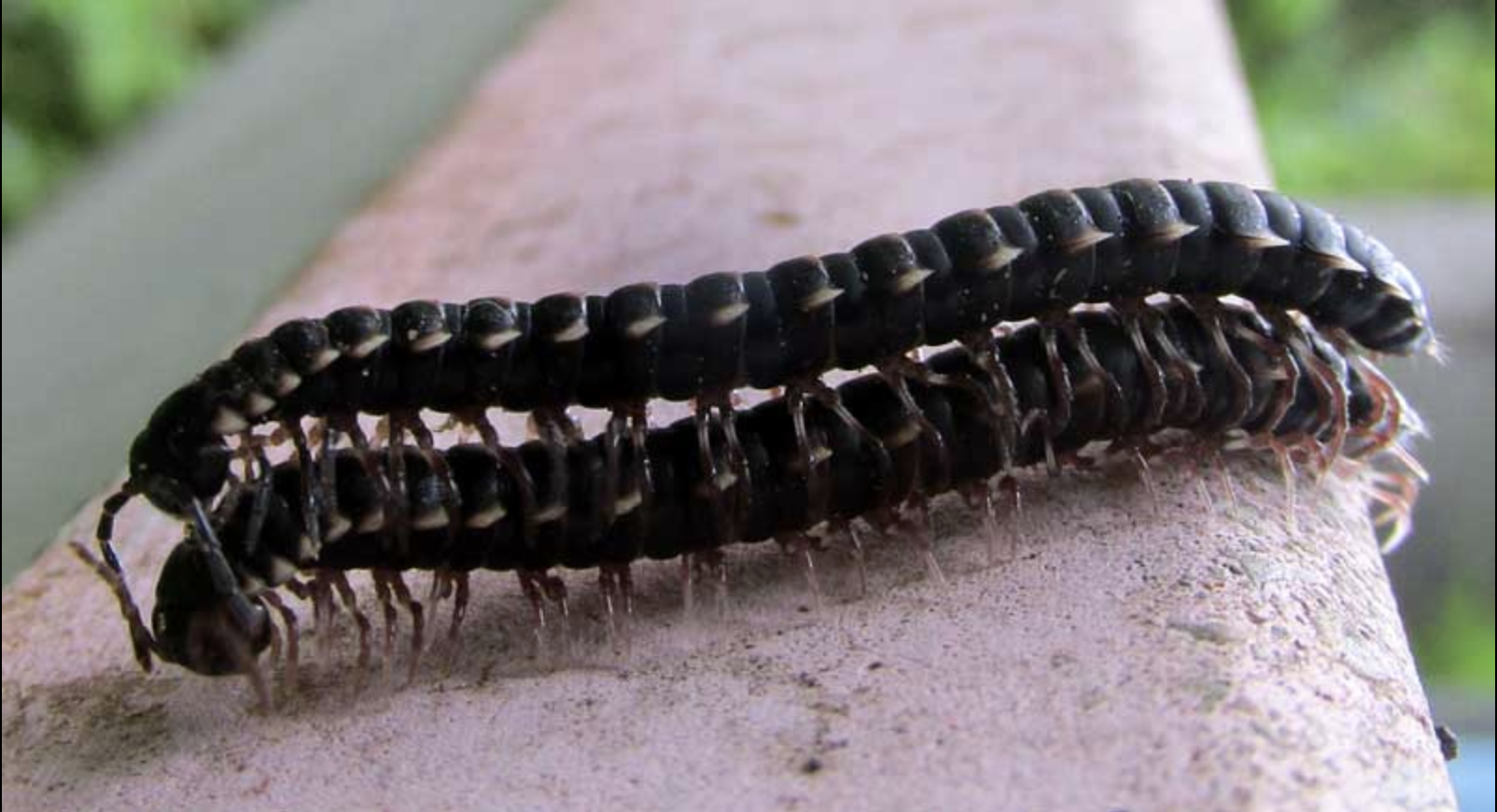
Male greenhouse millipede mating with a female greenhouse millipede. The male is on top while the female is on the bottom of the image.

The females, after their eggs are fertilized by the male sperm, release a sticky substance that seals the vulvae closed and keeps the eggs from being prematurely released from the female. After mating, the females will lay anywhere from forty to fifty fertilized eggs. These eggs will develop over the course of six to eight weeks in cool, dark, and moist soil. This growing environment is most optimal because it allows the larvae to have access to the nutrients they need to develop while also being protected from potential predators. The larvae will eventually hatch but the young millipedes will not be capable of reproduction until after multiple moults. At that time, they will have reached roughly about 6–7 months of age, which is when these arthropods reach full physical development.

== Habitat preferences ==
Oxidus gracilis prefers cool environments with a lot of moisture. They also require sheltered, mineral-rich, surfaces littered with organic matter to thrive and reproduce. Often they are found under stones or rotting logs in overgrown areas. Tropical and temperate climates support these conditions, especially within the United States, and it has been documented that they will invade greenhouses, garages, basements, and other man-made structures that fit their needs. Their tendency to breed rapidly and outgrow their natural habitats is another contributing factor to why they invade homes.

== Geographic range ==
Oxidus gracilis originates from the tropics but has spread to southern and western states as well as Northern Europe. These creatures thrive in various habitats ranging from tropical rainforests to temperate climates like the UK. Despite their small size, they play a crucial role in nutrient cycling and decomposition in these ecosystems. Their ability to adapt to different environments and their ecological importance make them notable inhabitants of both natural and urban landscapes.

== Ecology ==
Predators of the greenhouse millipede include ants, Gnamptogenys ingeborgi, and glowworm larvae, Zarhipis integripennis. Both predators have similar tactics when hunting a greenhouse millipede. The ant first stings the millipede and kills it almost instantly. By contrast, the glowworm larvae will flip the millipede and bite it through its ventral nerve cord to paralyze it. Once the millipede is paralyzed, the glowworm larvae will begin to eat it starting at the front and working its way to the back. Similarly, the ant will take the millipede back to its nest and will begin to eat the greenhouse millipede one ring at a time.

The greenhouse millipede eats decaying organic matter. This includes leaf litter, mulch, and grass thatch. While it doesn't need to worry about hunting other organisms it does need to be able to defend itself which it is able to do through its chemical defenses. It does this by producing cyanide in its segmental glands. There are two parts of the glands one that produces the cyanophore which is what makes the cyanide harmless, and the other is the reaction chamber that makes an enzyme that separates the cyanide from the cyanophore. After this occurs the hydrogen cyanide can then emerge through a pore and kill any predator that is trying to attack.

The greenhouse millipede is more of an aggravation than a threat to humans. The North American population is known to mass migrate in certain areas, with piles of millipedes occasionally accumulating in roadways or drainage swales. When crushed they release a pungent smell resulting from their chemical defenses.

== Ecological importance ==
Greenhouse millipedes play an essential role in ecosystems. They are crucial for recycling deceased plant material, aerating soil, and providing sustenance for a variety of organisms, including reptiles, birds, mammals, and predatory insects. Their burrowing activities help aerate the soil, which promotes better water infiltration and drainage. They create channels in the soil which helps to enhance root growth and nutrient uptake by plants. This contributes to overall soil fertility. Their adaptability to urban environments and lack of natural predators make them valuable in urban settings. This is where they contribute to soil health and provide food for various animals. Being able to recognize their ecological importance is essential for conserving urban biodiversity and promoting sustainable urban development.
