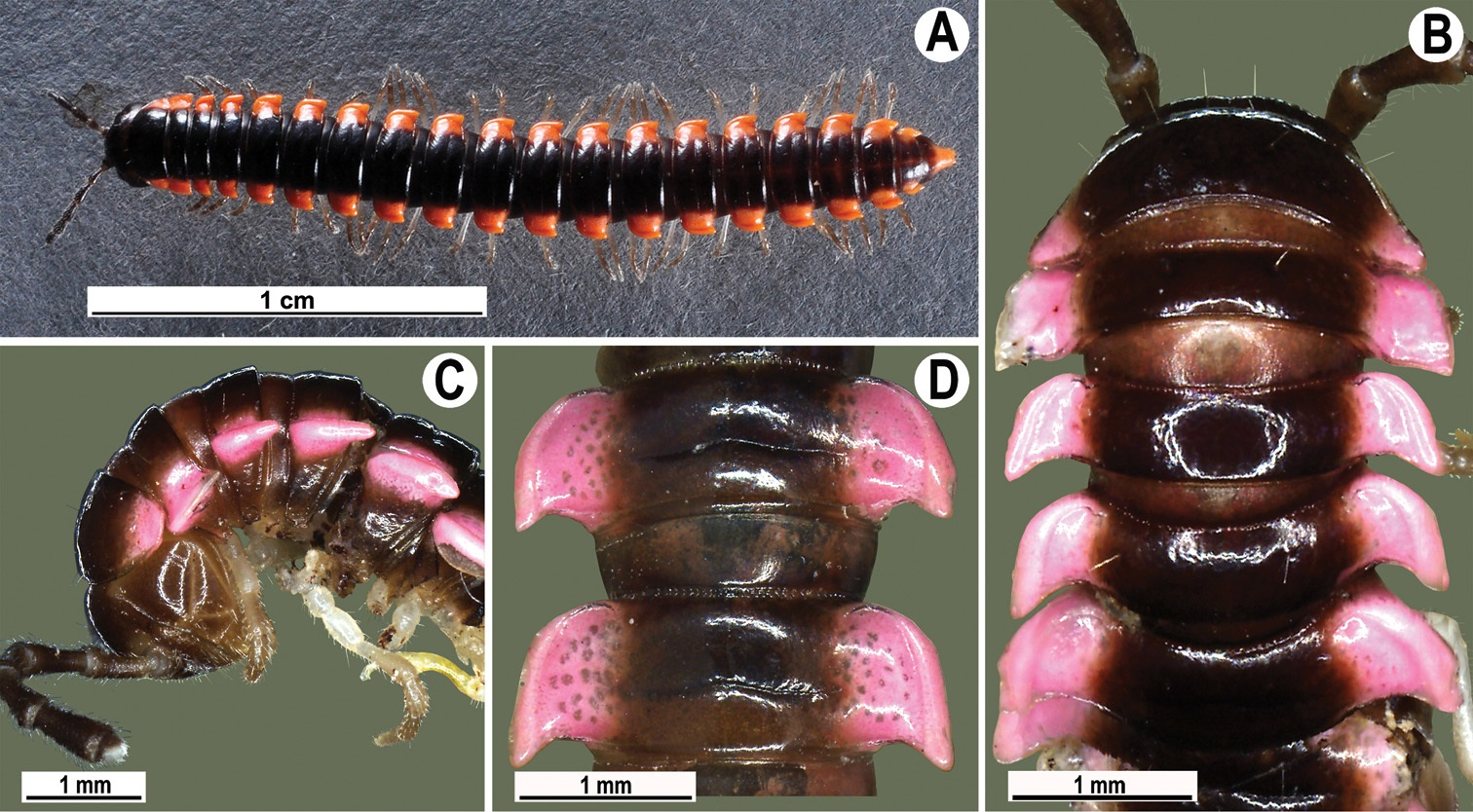
- Orthomorpha picturata

Scientific classification
- Domain: Eukaryota
- Kingdom: Animalia
- Phylum: Arthropoda
- Subphylum: Myriapoda
- Class: Diplopoda
- Order: Polydesmida
- Family: Paradoxosomatidae
- Subfamily: Paradoxosomatinae
- Tribe: Orthomorphini
- Genus: Orthomorpha; Bollman, 1893

Type species
- Polydesmus beaumontii Le Guillou, 1841

Species
- c. 50 (see text)
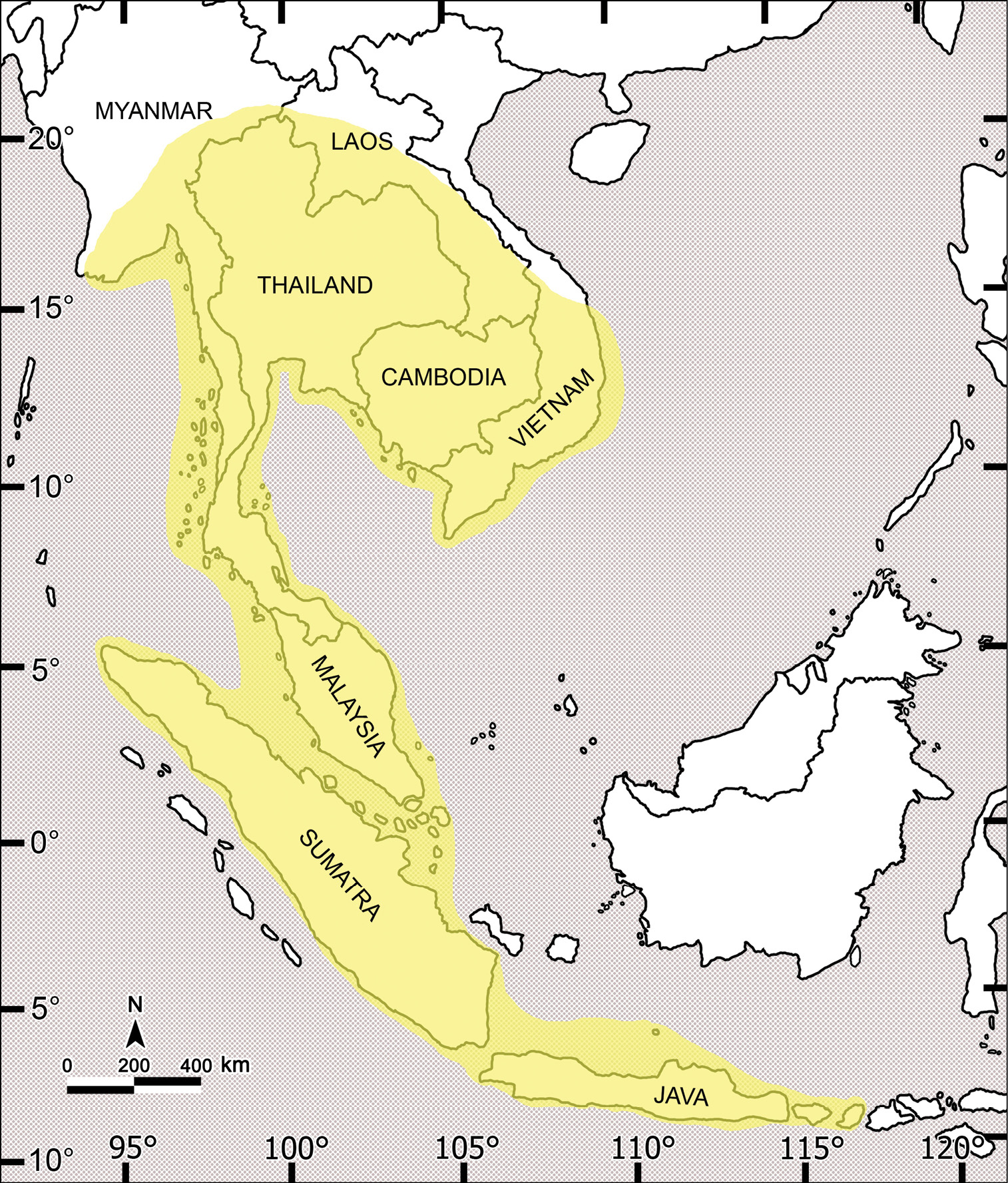
- Native range of Orthomorpha

= Orthomorpha =

Genus of millipedes

Orthomorpha is a genus of millipedes in the family Paradoxosomatidae containing approximately 50 species distributed in Southeast Asia.

== Description ==
Species of Orthomorpha possess 20 body segments and range from 15–50 mm long as adults. They range from 1.1–3.1 mm in body width, with prominent paranota (lateral keels) extending the width to 1.5–6.7 mm. Base coloration varies from brown to black, with brightly colored paranota and markings in various shades of yellow, orange, and brown, which becomes fainter in alcohol-preserved specimens. Some species have prominent bumps or "tubercles" on their dorsal metatergal segments.

== Distribution ==
Orthomorpha species range from Myanmar in the west, through the entire Indochinese Peninsula, to Lombok, Indonesia. The species O. coarctata, (also known as Asiomorpha coarctata) has been widely introduced by humans in tropics around the world.

== Species ==
The genus was revised by Likhitrakarn, Golovatch & Panha in 2011, who described several new species and assigned two to the new genus Orthomorphoides, yielding a total of 51 named species of Orthomorpha. Three more species from Laos were described in 2014.

Orthomorpha alutaria Likhitrakarn, Golovatch & Panha, 2010

Orthomorpha arboricola (Attems, 1937)
Orthomorpha asticta Likhitrakarn, Golovatch & Panha, 2010
Orthomorpha atypica Likhitrakarn, Golovatch, & Panha, 2011
Orthomorpha baliorum Golovatch, 1995
Orthomorpha banglangensis Golovatch, 1998
Orthomorpha beaumontii (Le Guillou, 1841)
Orthomorpha beroni Golovatch, 1997
Orthomorpha bipunctata (Sinclair, 1901)
Orthomorpha butteli Carl, 1922
Orthomorpha cambodjana (Attems, 1953)
Orthomorpha coarctata (De Saussure, 1860) (Alternately known as Asiomorpha coarctata)
Orthomorpha communis Likhitrakarn, Golovatch, & Panha, 2011
Orthomorpha conspicua (Pocock, 1894)
Orthomorpha crucifer (Pocock, 1889)
Orthomorpha elevata Likhitrakarn, Golovatch, & Panha, 2011
Orthomorpha enghoffi Likhitrakarn, Golovatch & Panha, 2010
Orthomorpha flaviventer (Attems, 1898)
Orthomorpha fluminoris Hoffman, 1977
Orthomorpha francisca Attems, 1930
Orthomorpha fuscocollaris Pocock, 1895
Orthomorpha gladiata Likhitrakarn, Golovatch, & Panha, 2014
Orthomorpha glandulosa (Attems, 1937)
Orthomorpha horologiformis Golovatch, 1998
Orthomorpha hydrobiologica Attems, 1930
Orthomorpha insularis Pocock, 1895
Orthomorpha isarankurai Likhitrakarn, Golovatch, & Panha, 2011
Orthomorpha karschi (Pocock, 1889)
Orthomorpha latiterga Likhitrakarn, Golovatch, & Panha, 2011
Orthomorpha lauta Golovatch, 1998
Orthomorpha melischi Golovatch, 1997
Orthomorpha mikrotropis Attems, 1898
Orthomorpha murphyi Hoffman, 1977
Orthomorpha parasericata Likhitrakarn, Golovatch & Panha, 2010
Orthomorpha paviei Brölemann, 1896
Orthomorpha picturata Likhitrakarn, Golovatch, & Panha, 2011
Orthomorpha pterygota Golovatch, 1998
Orthomorpha rotundicollis (Attems, 1937)
Orthomorpha scabra Jeekel, 1964
Orthomorpha sericata Jeekel, 1964
Orthomorpha similanensis Likhitrakarn, Golovatch, & Panha, 2011
Orthomorpha spiniformis Likhitrakarn, Golovatch, & Panha, 2011
Orthomorpha subelevata Likhitrakarn, Golovatch, & Panha, 2011
Orthomorpha suberecta Likhitrakarn, Golovatch, & Panha, 2011
Orthomorpha suberectoides Likhitrakarn, Golovatch, & Panha, 2014
Orthomorpha subkarschi Golovatch, 1998
Orthomorpha subsericata Golovatch, 1998
Orthomorpha subtuberculifera Likhitrakarn, Golovatch, & Panha, 2011
Orthomorpha sutchariti Likhitrakarn, Golovatch, & Panha, 2014
Orthomorpha tenuipes (Attems, 1898)
Orthomorpha thalebanica Golovatch, 1998
Orthomorpha tuberculifera Likhitrakarn, Golovatch, & Panha, 2011
Orthomorpha unicolor Attems, 1930
Orthomorpha weberi (Pocock, 1894)

Orthomorpha zehntneri (Carl, 1902)
