= Australiosoma =

Scientific classification
- Domain: Eukaryota
- Kingdom: Animalia
- Phylum: Arthropoda
- Subphylum: Myriapoda
- Class: Diplopoda
- Order: Polydesmida
- Family: Paradoxosomatidae
- Genus: Australiosoma; Brölemann, 1913

Genus of millipedes

Australiosoma is a genus of millipedes belonging to the family Paradoxosomatidae.

The species of this genus are found in Australia.

Species:

- Australiosoma anulatum Attems, 1931
- Australiosoma castaneum Attems, 1944
- Australiosoma clavigerum (Verhoeff, 1928)
- Australiosoma combei Rowe & Sierwald, 2006
- Australiosoma frogatti Brölemann, 1913
- Australiosoma fulbrighti Rowe & Sierwald, 2006
- Australiosoma inusitatum Jeekel, 2003
- Australiosoma kosciuskovagus Brölemann, 1913
- Australiosoma laminatum Jeekel, 1984
- Australiosoma michaelseni (Attems, 1931)
- Australiosoma nodulosum Jeekel, 2003
- Australiosoma rainbowi Brölemann, 1913
