= Dicranogonus =

Scientific classification
- Kingdom: Animalia
- Phylum: Arthropoda
- Subphylum: Myriapoda
- Class: Diplopoda
- Order: Polydesmida
- Family: Paradoxosomatidae
- Genus: Dicranogonus; Jeekel, 1982

Genus of millipedes

Dicranogonus is a genus of millipedes belonging to the family Paradoxosomatidae.

The species of this genus are found in Southern Australia.

Species:

- Dicranogonus pix Jeekel, 1982
