= Tonkinosoma =

Scientific classification
- Kingdom: Animalia
- Phylum: Arthropoda
- Subphylum: Myriapoda
- Class: Diplopoda
- Order: Polydesmida
- Family: Paradoxosomatidae
- Tribe: Chamberliniini
- Genus: Tonkinosoma; Jeekel, 1953

Genus of millipedes

Tonkinosoma is a genus of millipedes in the family Paradoxosomatidae. The genus contains three species, with a new species discovered in 2018. Type species was described from northern Vietnam. Now the species are ranges from Himalayan region and southeast Asian region.

They are characterized by the differences of gonopods. They have distinct or indistinct geniculation cingulum which show a postfemoral part demarcated basally. Femorite is long and slender.

== See also ==
- Tonkinosoma flexipes Jeekel, 1953 – northern Vietnam, China
- Tonkinosoma tiani Liu & Golovatch, 2018 – southern China
- Tonkinosoma jeekeli Nguyen, 2011 – northern Vietnam
