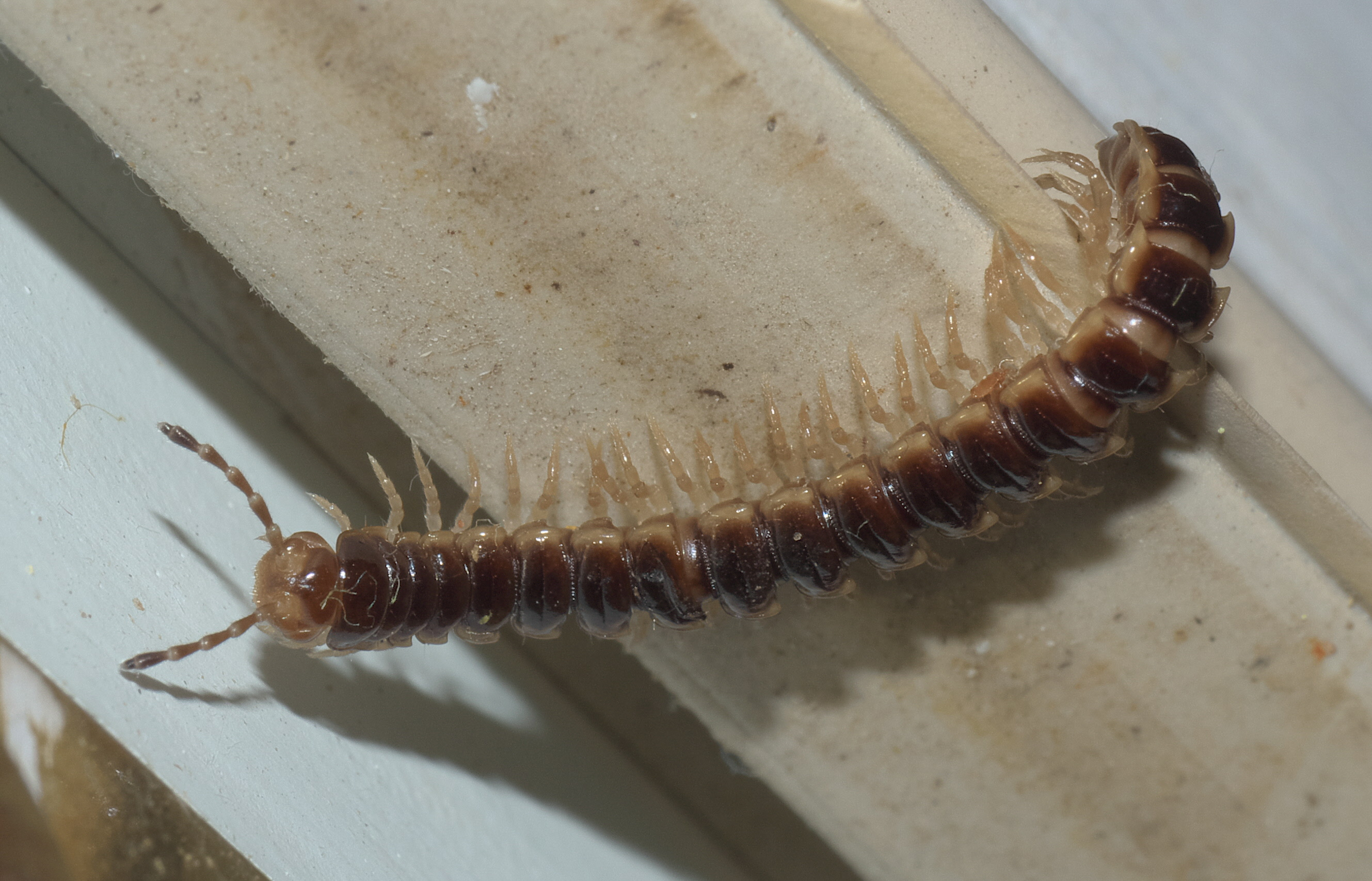
- Oxidus gracilis

Scientific classification
- Kingdom: Animalia
- Phylum: Arthropoda
- Subphylum: Myriapoda
- Class: Diplopoda
- Order: Polydesmida
- Family: Paradoxosomatidae
- Genus: Oxidus; Cook, 1911

= Oxidus =

Genus of millipedes

Oxidus is a genus of flat-backed millipedes in the family Paradoxosomatidae. There are about nine described species in Oxidus.

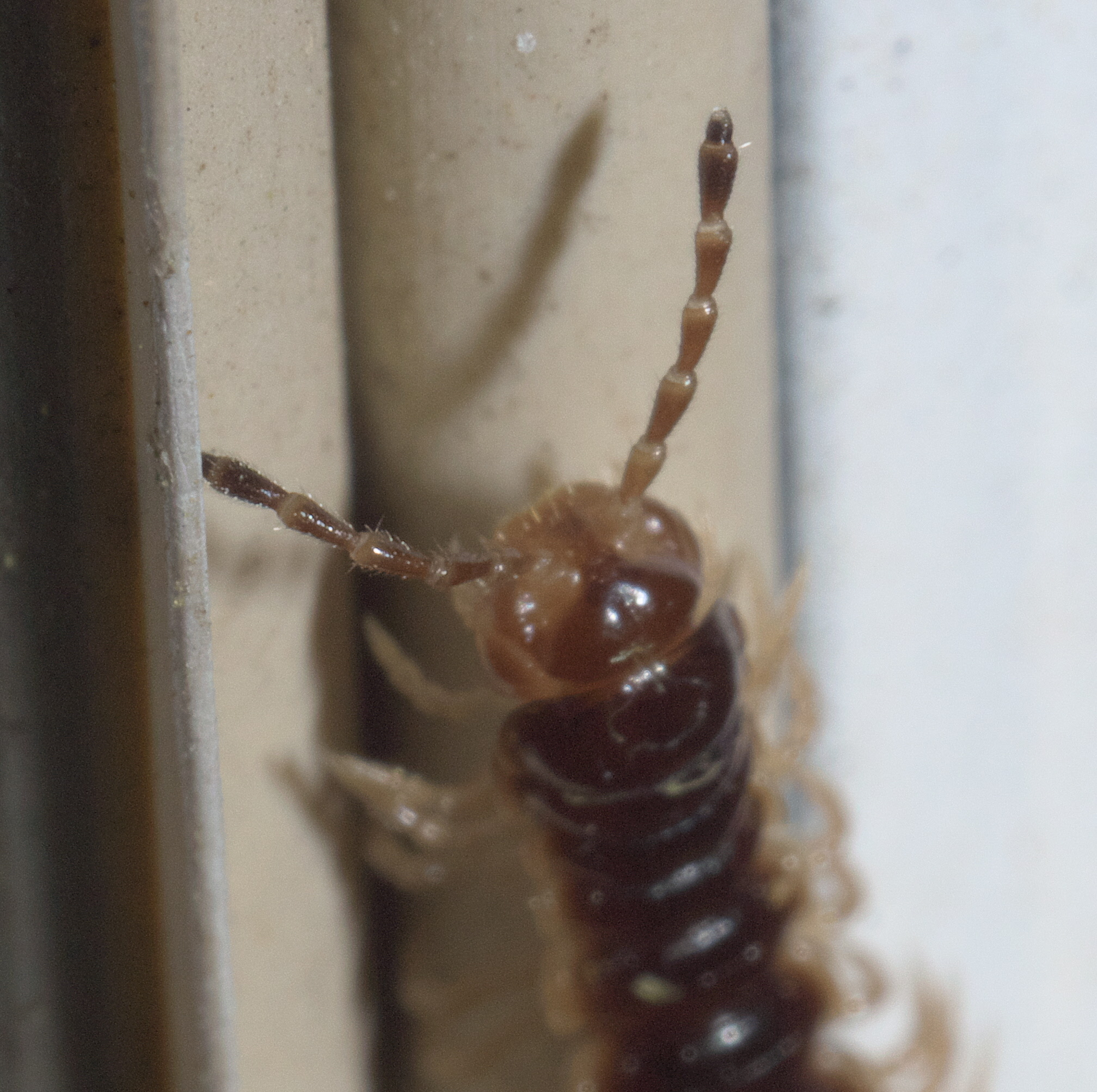
Oxidus gracilis

== Species ==
These nine species belong to the genus Oxidus:

- Oxidus avia (Verhoeff, 1937)
- Oxidus circofera (Verhoeff, 1931)
- Oxidus filarius (Attems, 1932)
- Oxidus gigas (Attems, 1953)
- Oxidus gracilis (Koch, 1847) (greenhouse millipede)
- Oxidus hydrobiologicus (Attems, 1927)
- Oxidus kosingai (Wang, 1958)
- Oxidus obtusus (Takakuwa, 1942)
- Oxidus riukiarius (Verhoeff, 1940)
- Oxidus sontus (Chamberlin, 1910)
