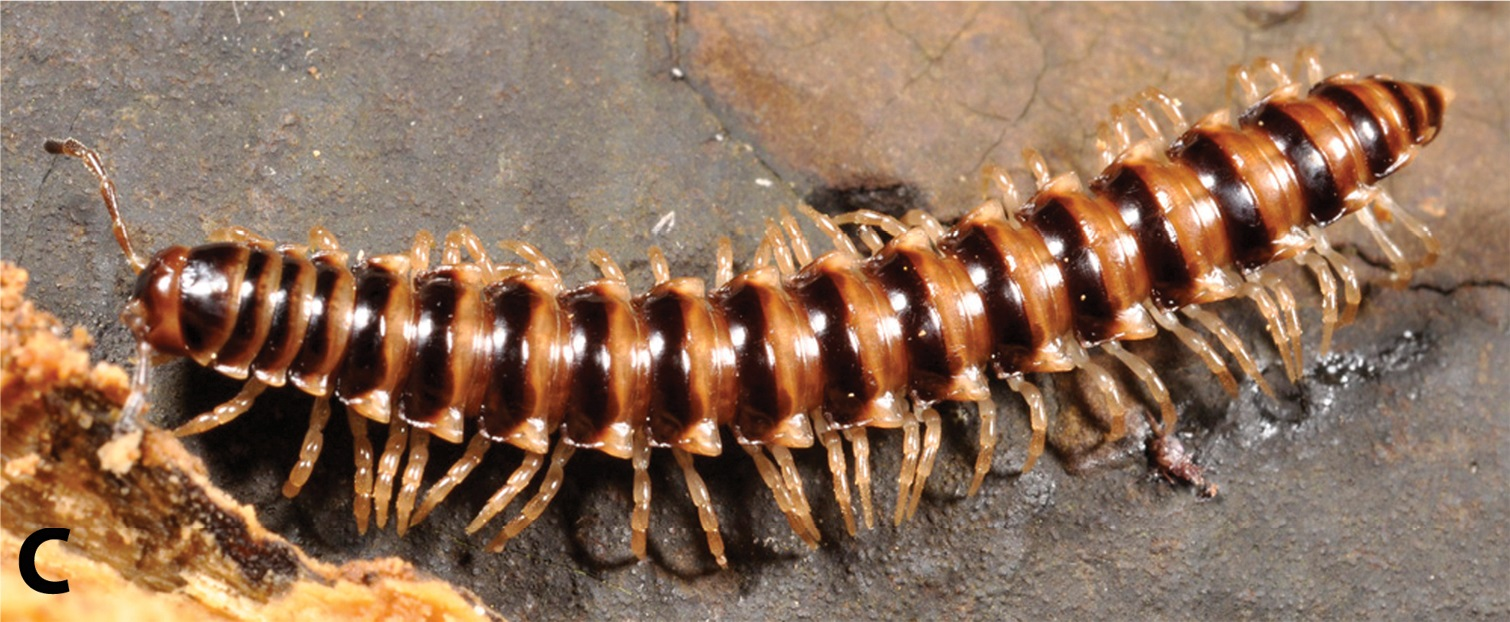
- Chamberlinius uenoi

Scientific classification
- Kingdom: Animalia
- Phylum: Arthropoda
- Subphylum: Myriapoda
- Class: Diplopoda
- Order: Polydesmida
- Family: Paradoxosomatidae
- Subfamily: Paradoxosomatinae
- Tribe: Chamberliniini
- Genus: Chamberlinius; Wang, 1956

Type species
- Chamberlinius hualienensis Wang, 1956

= Chamberlinius =

Genus of millipedes

Chamberlinius is a genus of flat-backed millipedes in the family Paradoxosomatidae. There are five species; 3 of which occur only Taiwan, one only in the Ryukyu Islands of southeast Japan, and one occurring in both areas. Individuals are 25–37 mm (0.98–1.46 in) long and up to 5.5 mm wide, colored in pale yellow to brown, sometimes with dark brown markings on the anterior portion of body segments.

== Species ==
| Species | Taxon author | Geographic range |
|---|---|---|
| Chamberlinius hualienensis | Wang, 1956 | Taiwan, Japan (Ryukyu Islands) |
| Chamberlinius pessior | Chen et al., 2011 | Taiwan |
| Chamberlinius piceofasciatus | (Gressitt, 1941) | Taiwan |
| Chamberlinius sublaevus | Chen et al., 2011 | Taiwan |
| Chamberlinius uenoi | (Murakami, 1975) | Japan (Ryukyu Islands) |
