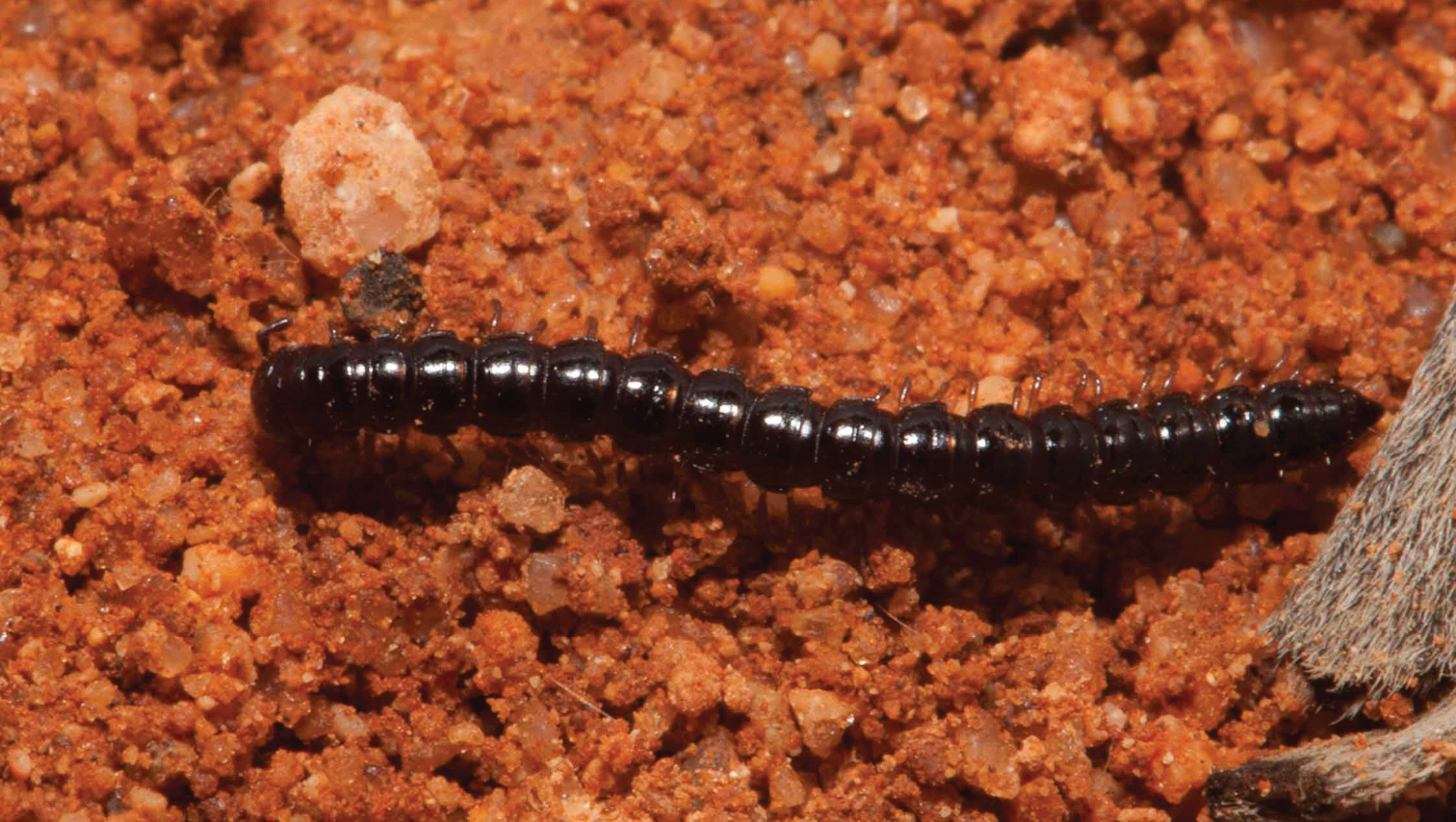
- Boreohesperus dubitalis

Scientific classification
- Kingdom: Animalia
- Phylum: Arthropoda
- Subphylum: Myriapoda
- Class: Diplopoda
- Order: Polydesmida
- Family: Paradoxosomatidae
- Subfamily: Australiosomatinae
- Tribe: Australiosomatini
- Genus: Boreohesperus; Shear, 1992

Type species
- Boreohesperus capensis Shear, 1992
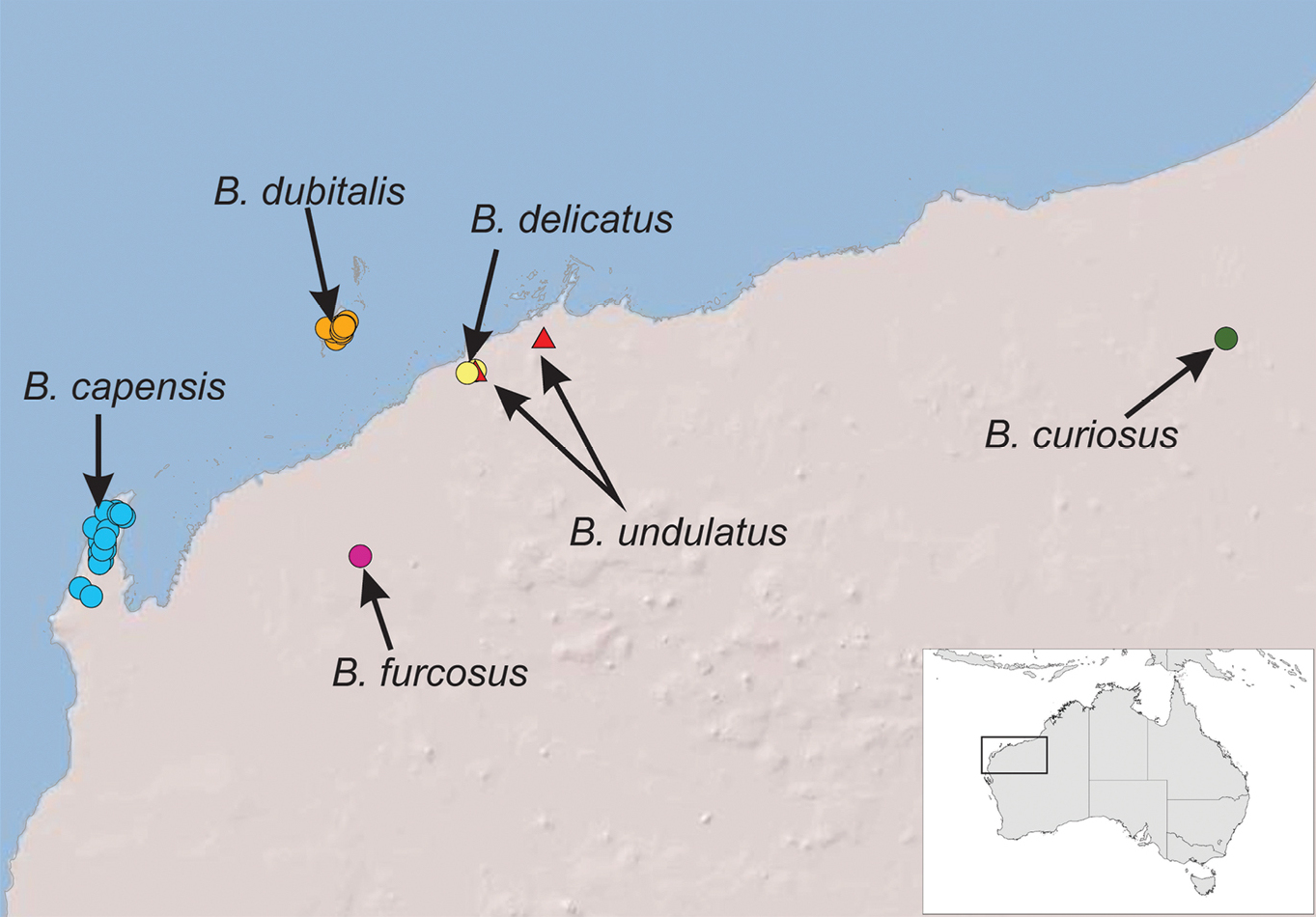
- Distribution of Boreohesperus species

= Boreohesperus =

Genus of millipedes

Boreohesperus is a genus of paradoxosomatid millipedes containing six species native to Western Australia. The name refers to the northwestern distribution in Australia, deriving from Boreas, Greek god of the North, and hesperus, Latin for "west".

Individuals have twenty body segments, each smooth and unsculptured, with a distinct waist between the first and second tergites (prozonite and metazonite) of each segment. The paranota (keels), if present, are small and poorly developed. The largest species, B. capensis, reaches 22 mm (0.87 in) in length, and 2 mm (0.079 in) in body width. Lengths of other species range from 7 to 10 mm (0.28 to 0.39 in). The body color of live individuals is dark brown, appearing black. Biologist William Shear described the genus Boreohesperus and its first known species, B. capensis, in 1992 based on specimens collected from cave entrances in the Cape Range in North West Cape, Western Australia. Five new species were described in 2013, including one endemic to Barrow Island. The six species are distinguished primarily by differences in gonopod structure, and to a lesser extent, body size.

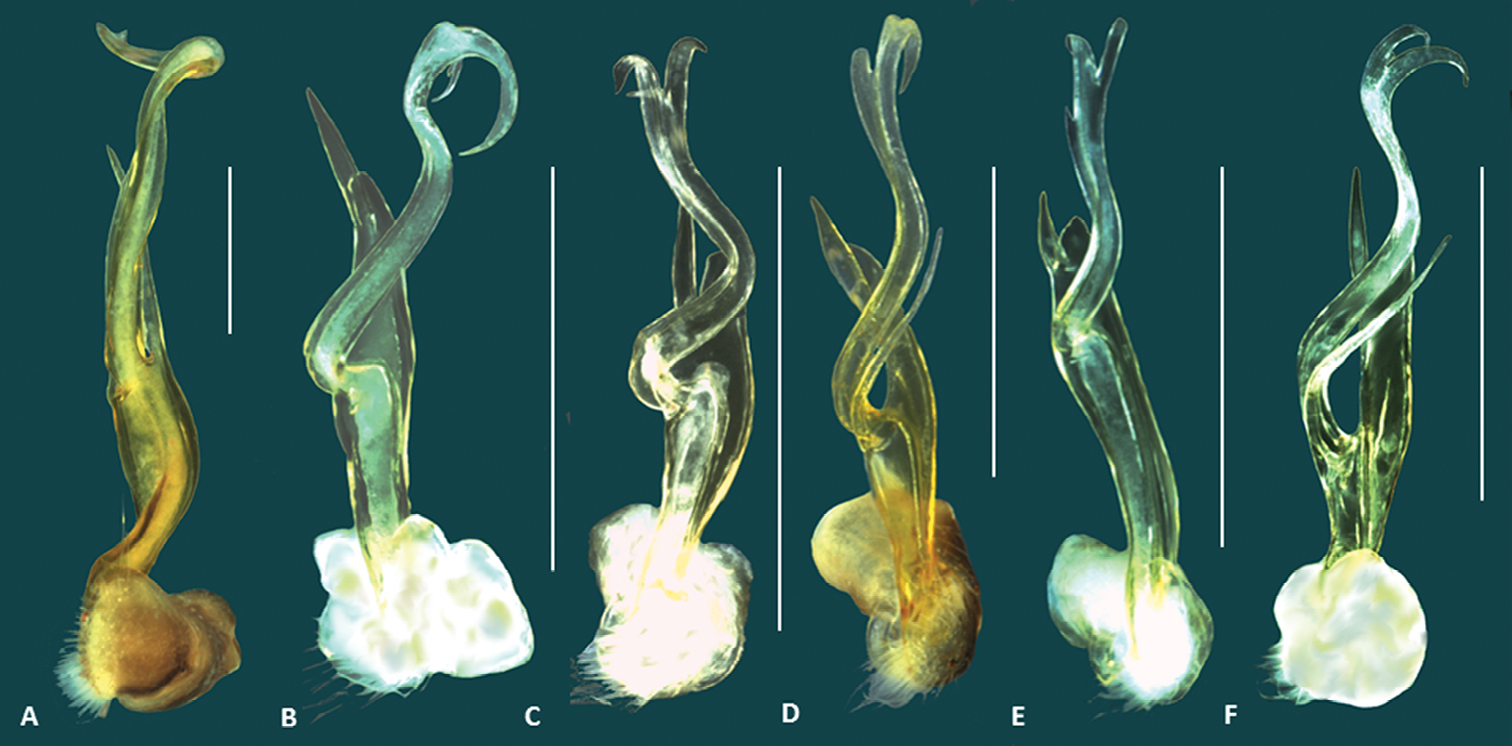
Gonopod shape is a key difference among Boreohesperus species

== Distribution ==
The westernmost species, B. capensis, occurs throughout the North West Cape. B. furcosus is known from Mount Minnie, in the Pilbara region. B. undulatus and B. delicatus co-occur in an area of Pilbara, the only two sympatric species of the genus. Furthest east is B. curiosus, which is only known from the Mount Elvire area in Pilbara. The sixth species, B. dubitalis, occurs only on Barrow Island, where it is widespread and abundant.
