= Cleptomorpha =

Scientific classification
- Kingdom: Animalia
- Phylum: Arthropoda
- Subphylum: Myriapoda
- Class: Diplopoda
- Order: Polydesmida
- Family: Paradoxosomatidae
- Genus: Cleptomorpha; Golovatch, 1996

Genus of millipedes

Cleptomorpha is a genus of millipedes belonging to the family Paradoxosomatidae.

Species:

- Cleptomorpha sumatrana Golovatch, 1997
