= Pyragrogonus =

Scientific classification
- Kingdom: Animalia
- Phylum: Arthropoda
- Subphylum: Myriapoda
- Class: Diplopoda
- Order: Polydesmida
- Family: Paradoxosomatidae
- Subfamily: Paradoxosomatinae
- Tribe: Cnemodesmini
- Genus: Pyragrogonus; Jeekel, 1980
- Species: P. willeyi

Binomial name
- Pyragrogonus willeyi Carl, 1932

Genus of millipedes

Pyragrogonus willeyi is a species of millipede in the family Paradoxosomatidae. It is endemic to Sri Lanka. It is the only species in the genus Pyragrogonus.
