= Hoffmanina =

Scientific classification
- Kingdom: Animalia
- Phylum: Arthropoda
- Subphylum: Myriapoda
- Class: Diplopoda
- Order: Polydesmida
- Family: Paradoxosomatidae
- Genus: Hoffmanina; Jeekel, 1968

Genus of millipedes

Hoffmanina is a genus of millipedes belonging to the family Paradoxosomatidae.

Species:

- Hoffmanina gorongozae (Lawrence, 1962)
