= Catharosoma =

Scientific classification
- Domain: Eukaryota
- Kingdom: Animalia
- Phylum: Arthropoda
- Subphylum: Myriapoda
- Class: Diplopoda
- Order: Polydesmida
- Family: Paradoxosomatidae
- Genus: Catharosoma; Silvestri, 1897

Genus of millipedes

Catharosoma is a genus of millipedes belonging to the family Paradoxosomatidae.

The species of this genus are found in Southern America.

Species:

- Catharosoma bilineatum Golovatch, 2005
- Catharosoma bolivae Chamberlin, 1957
- Catharosoma bromelicola (Schubart, 1945)
- Catharosoma curitibense Schubart, 1954
- Catharosoma digitale Schubart, 1954
- Catharosoma hoffmani Kraus, 1956
- Catharosoma ibirapuitense Rodrigues, Golovatch, Ott & Ro-Drigues, 2020
- Catharosoma intermedium (Carl, 1902)
- Catharosoma mahnerti Golovatch, 2005
- Catharosoma mesorphinum (Attems, 1898)
- Catharosoma mesoxanthum (Attems, 1898)
- Catharosoma mixtum Kraus, 1956
- Catharosoma myrmekurum (Attems, 1898)
- Catharosoma palmatum Schubart, 1954
- Catharosoma palustre Schubart, 1943
- Catharosoma paraguayense (Silvestri, 1895)
- Catharosoma pedritense Rodrigues, Golovatch, Ott & Ro-Drigues, 2020
- Catharosoma peraccae Silvestri, 1902
- Catharosoma taeniatum (Brölemann, 1929)
