= Cormocephalus elegans =

Scientific classification
- Domain: Eukaryota
- Kingdom: Animalia
- Phylum: Arthropoda
- Subphylum: Myriapoda
- Class: Chilopoda
- Order: Scolopendromorpha
- Family: Scolopendridae
- Genus: Cormocephalus
- Species: C. elegans

Binomial name
- Cormocephalus elegans Kraepelin 1903

Subspecies
- Cormocephalus elegans elegans Kraepelin, 1903; Cormocephalus elegans gracilipleurus Kraepelin, 1903

Species of centipede

Cormocephalus elegans is a species of centipede of the family Scolopendridae found in North Africa.

The name Cormocephalus elegans zuluinus is a synonym for Cormocephalus westwoodi anceps.
