= Cormocephalus rugosus =

Scientific classification
- Kingdom: Animalia
- Phylum: Arthropoda
- Subphylum: Myriapoda
- Class: Chilopoda
- Order: Scolopendromorpha
- Family: Scolopendridae
- Genus: Cormocephalus
- Species: C. rugosus

Binomial name
- Cormocephalus rugosus Ribaut, 1923

Species of centipede

Cormocephalus rugosus is a species of centipede in the Scolopendridae family. It is endemic to New Caledonia, a French overseas territory in Melanesia. It was first described in 1923 by French entomologist Henri Ribaut.

== Distribution ==
The type locality is Oubatche, near the north-western end of Grande Terre.
