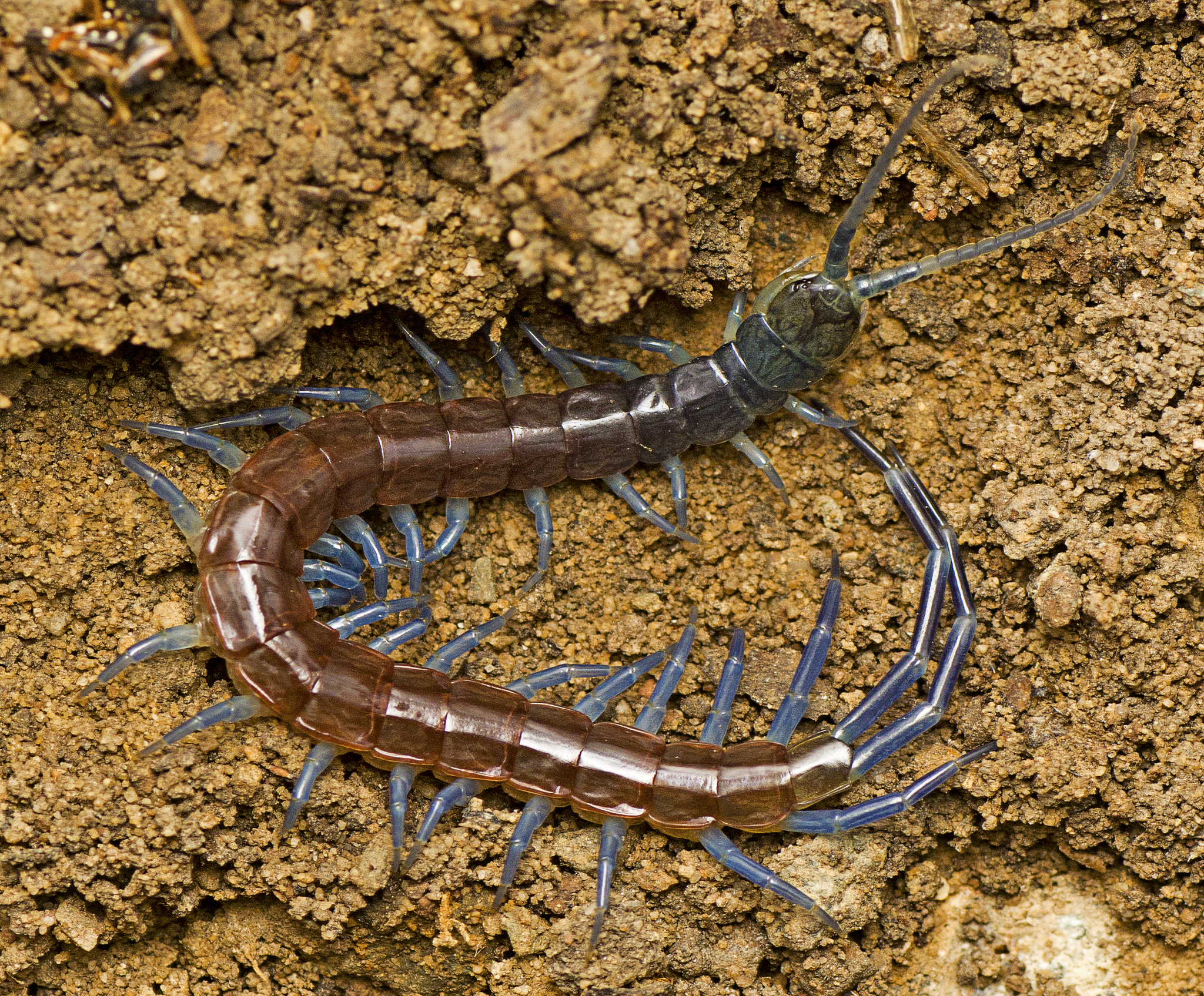

Scientific classification
- Kingdom: Animalia
- Phylum: Arthropoda
- Subphylum: Myriapoda
- Class: Chilopoda
- Order: Scolopendromorpha
- Family: Scolopendridae
- Genus: Rhysida
- Species: R. nuda

Binomial name
- Rhysida nuda (Newport, 1845)

Synonyms
- Branchiostoma nuda Newport, 1845; Branchiostoma obsoletum Porat, 1876; Branchiostoma subinerme Meinert, 1885; Rhysida kurandana Chamberlin, 1920; Rhysida defecta Chamberlin, 1920

= Rhysida nuda =

Species of centipede

Rhysida nuda is a species of centipede in the Scolopendridae family. It is endemic to Australia and was first described in 1887 by British entomologist George Newport.

== Distribution ==
The species occurs in the Northern Territory, Queensland, New South Wales and Victoria.

== Behaviour ==
The centipedes are solitary terrestrial predators that inhabit plant litter, soil and rotting wood.
