= Cormocephalus hirtipes =

Scientific classification
- Kingdom: Animalia
- Phylum: Arthropoda
- Subphylum: Myriapoda
- Class: Chilopoda
- Order: Scolopendromorpha
- Family: Scolopendridae
- Genus: Cormocephalus
- Species: C. hirtipes

Binomial name
- Cormocephalus hirtipes Ribaut, 1923

Synonyms
- Cupipes hirtipes Kohlrausch, 1878

Species of centipede

Cormocephalus hirtipes is a species of centipede in the Scolopendridae family. It is endemic to New Caledonia, a French overseas territory in Melanesia. It was first described in 1923 by French entomologist Henri Ribaut.

== Distribution ==
The species occurs on the main island of Grande Terre. The type locality is the commune of Canala.
