= Cormocephalus aurantiipes =

Scientific classification
- Domain: Eukaryota
- Kingdom: Animalia
- Phylum: Arthropoda
- Subphylum: Myriapoda
- Class: Chilopoda
- Order: Scolopendromorpha
- Family: Scolopendridae
- Genus: Cormocephalus
- Species: C. aurantiipes

Binomial name
- Cormocephalus aurantiipes (Newport, 1844)

Species of centipede

Cormocephalus aurantiipes, commonly known as the orange-footed centipede, is a common species of centipede found throughout Australia, often confused with C. westwoodi. It can be found in every Australian state except Tasmania and the Northern Territory. Like most centipedes it comes in many different "colour forms", depending on locality.

C. aurantiipes is a medium-sized centipede, capable of reaching lengths of up to 140 millimetres (5.5 in), but more commonly found around 100 mm (3.9 in).
