= Campylostigmus orientalis =

Scientific classification
- Kingdom: Animalia
- Phylum: Arthropoda
- Subphylum: Myriapoda
- Class: Chilopoda
- Order: Scolopendromorpha
- Family: Scolopendridae
- Genus: Campylostigmus
- Species: C. orientalis

Binomial name
- Campylostigmus orientalis Ribaut, 1923

Species of centipede

Campylostigmus orientalis is a species of centipede in the Geophilidae family. It is endemic to New Caledonia, a French overseas territory in Melanesia. It was first described in 1923 by French entomologist Henri Ribaut.

== Distribution ==
The type locality is the vicinity of Tao Waterfall, in the commune of Hienghène, on Grande Terre.
