= Arthrorhabdus paucispinus =

Scientific classification
- Kingdom: Animalia
- Phylum: Arthropoda
- Subphylum: Myriapoda
- Class: Chilopoda
- Order: Scolopendromorpha
- Family: Scolopendridae
- Genus: Arthrorhabdus
- Species: A. paucispinus

Binomial name
- Arthrorhabdus paucispinus L.E.Koch, 1984

Species of centipede

Arthrorhabdus paucispinus is a species of centipede in the family Scolopendridae. Endemic to Australia, it was first described in 1984 by Australian myriapodologist L. E. Koch. It is a medium-sized species, up to 64 millimetres long, with a reddish-brown head and pale brown body segments. It has 14 to 18 segments on its antennae, large teeth on the feeding mouthparts, and its last pair of legs feature short bristles and a small projection.

== Description ==
Arthrorhabdus paucispinus is a moderate-sized centipede with an average total body length of 64 millimetres (mm), ranging between 50 and 86 mm. The width of the head, or cephalic plate, averages at about 2.4 mm, with measurements ranging from 1.9 to 3.2 mm. The length of the anal-leg trochanter (part of the leg nearest the body) averages 2.1 mm, varying from 1.5 to 2.7 mm. Most of the body segments, or tergites, have a pale brown colour. However, the cephalic plate, the bases of the first three antennal segments, the mouthparts (toxignaths), the ventral part of the head, the first body segment (tergite I), and the first sternite are a reddish-brown colour. The last body segment (tergite XXI) and the anal legs are a brownish yellow.

The antennae of this centipede have 14 to 18 segments and can be very short or long, sometimes reaching as far as the fourth body segment. The base of the maxilliped, a mouthpart used for feeding, is almost smooth. It has four, and sometimes five, large, evenly-spaced teeth on each side.

Starting from the fourth body segment, and sometimes as far back as the eighth, there is a pair of complete median sulci which are grooves or depressions in the body segments. The last tergite (XXI) is approximately 1.5 times longer than it is wide and has a strongly convex posterior edge with a notable median sulcus. The sternite of the last body segment (sternite XXI) has a nearly straight posterior edge and usually has a weak, wide median sulcus. This groove is typically present in the middle or absent, but it can sometimes be more pronounced.

The claws of the centipede's legs are about half the length of the end section of the leg (distal tarsus). The anal-leg coxopleuron, a part of the last pair of legs, is moderately narrow and features a small process, or projection. These legs also have two short bristles at the base of the claw. In contrast, another Australian endemic, Arthrorhabdus mjobergi, has a single minute spur at the claw base.

Notably, Arthrorhabdus paucispinus has a varying spine count, with the anal-leg trochanter processes usually having two large, curved spines, though this number can range from none to four. The spines on non-regenerated legs follow a formula referred to as A1, B1, or absent, indicating the presence or absence of spines at specific points.

== Distribution and distribution ==
The species occurs in Western Australia. In a field study of myriapods conducted in the southern Carnarvon Basin, Arthrorhabdus paucispinus was typically found in relatively dry, sandy locations.

== Behaviour ==
The centipedes are solitary terrestrial predators that inhabit plant litter, soil and rotting wood.
