= Campylostigmus biseriatus =

Scientific classification
- Kingdom: Animalia
- Phylum: Arthropoda
- Subphylum: Myriapoda
- Class: Chilopoda
- Order: Scolopendromorpha
- Family: Scolopendridae
- Genus: Campylostigmus
- Species: C. biseriatus

Binomial name
- Campylostigmus biseriatus Ribaut, 1923

Species of centipede

Campylostigmus biseriatus is a species of centipede in the Geophilidae family. It is endemic to New Caledonia, a French overseas territory in Melanesia. It was first described in 1923 by French entomologist Henri Ribaut.

== Distribution ==
The type locality is the summit of Mount Humboldt on Grande Terre.
