= Cormocephalus inermis =

Scientific classification
- Kingdom: Animalia
- Phylum: Arthropoda
- Subphylum: Myriapoda
- Class: Chilopoda
- Order: Scolopendromorpha
- Family: Scolopendridae
- Genus: Cormocephalus
- Species: C. inermis

Binomial name
- Cormocephalus inermis Kraepelin, 1916

Synonyms
- Cupipes inermis Kraepelin, 1916

Species of centipede

Cormocephalus inermis is a species of centipede in the Scolopendridae family. It is endemic to Australia, and was first described in 1916 by German naturalist Karl Kraepelin, following the collection of specimen material by Swedish zoologist Eric Mjöberg.

== Distribution ==
The species is found in the Gulf region of northern Queensland.

== Behaviour ==
The centipedes are solitary terrestrial predators that inhabit plant litter, soil and rotting wood.
