= Cormocephalus pustulatus =

Scientific classification
- Kingdom: Animalia
- Phylum: Arthropoda
- Subphylum: Myriapoda
- Class: Chilopoda
- Order: Scolopendromorpha
- Family: Scolopendridae
- Genus: Cormocephalus
- Species: C. pustulatus

Binomial name
- Cormocephalus pustulatus Kraepelin, 1903

Species of centipede

Cormocephalus pustulatus is a species of centipede in the Scolopendridae family. It is endemic to New Caledonia, a French overseas territory in Melanesia. It was first described in 1903 by German naturalist Karl Kraepelin.

== Distribution ==
The species occurs on the main island of Grande Terre.
