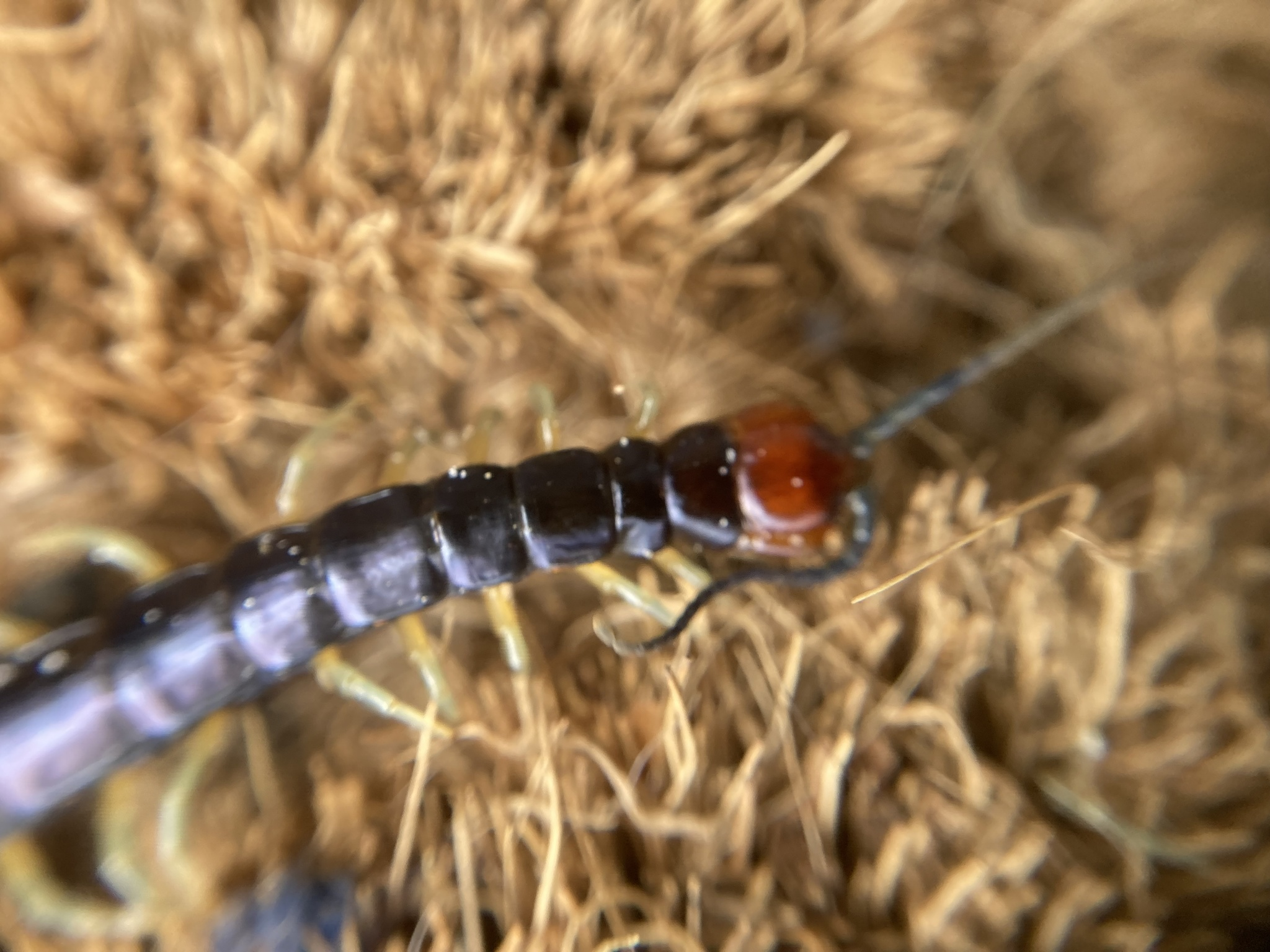
- Cormocephalus hartmeyeri

Scientific classification
- Kingdom: Animalia
- Phylum: Arthropoda
- Subphylum: Myriapoda
- Class: Chilopoda
- Order: Scolopendromorpha
- Family: Scolopendridae
- Genus: Cormocephalus
- Species: C. hartmeyeri

Binomial name
- Cormocephalus hartmeyeri Kraepelin, 1908

= Cormocephalus hartmeyeri =

Species of centipede

Cormocephalus hartmeyeri is a species of centipede in the family Scolopendridae. It is endemic to Australia, and was first described in 1908 by German naturalist Karl Kraepelin.

== Distribution ==
The species is found in the Western Plateau region of Western Australia.

== Behaviour ==
The centipedes are solitary terrestrial predators that inhabit plant litter, soil and rotting wood.
