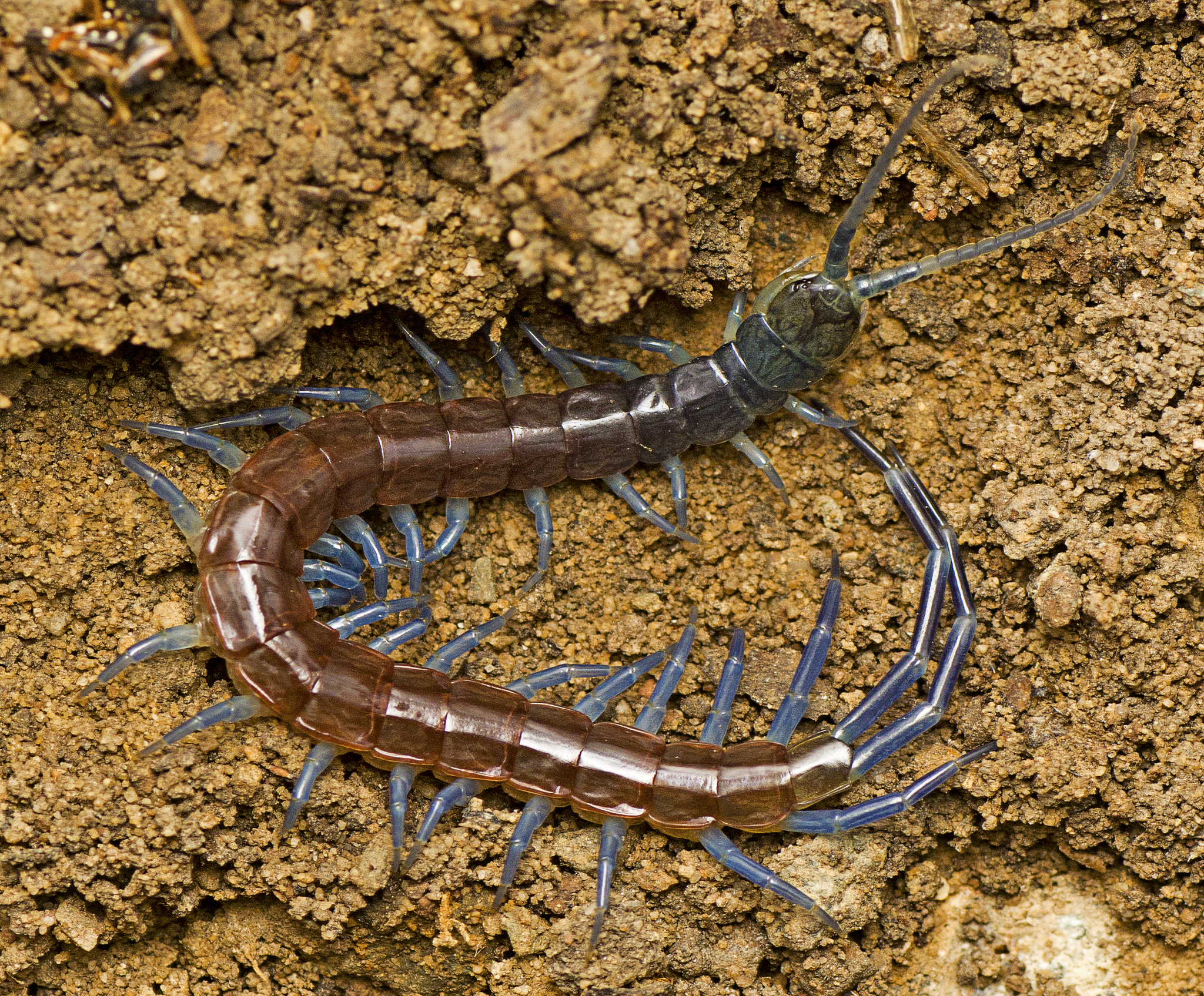
- Rhysida nuda
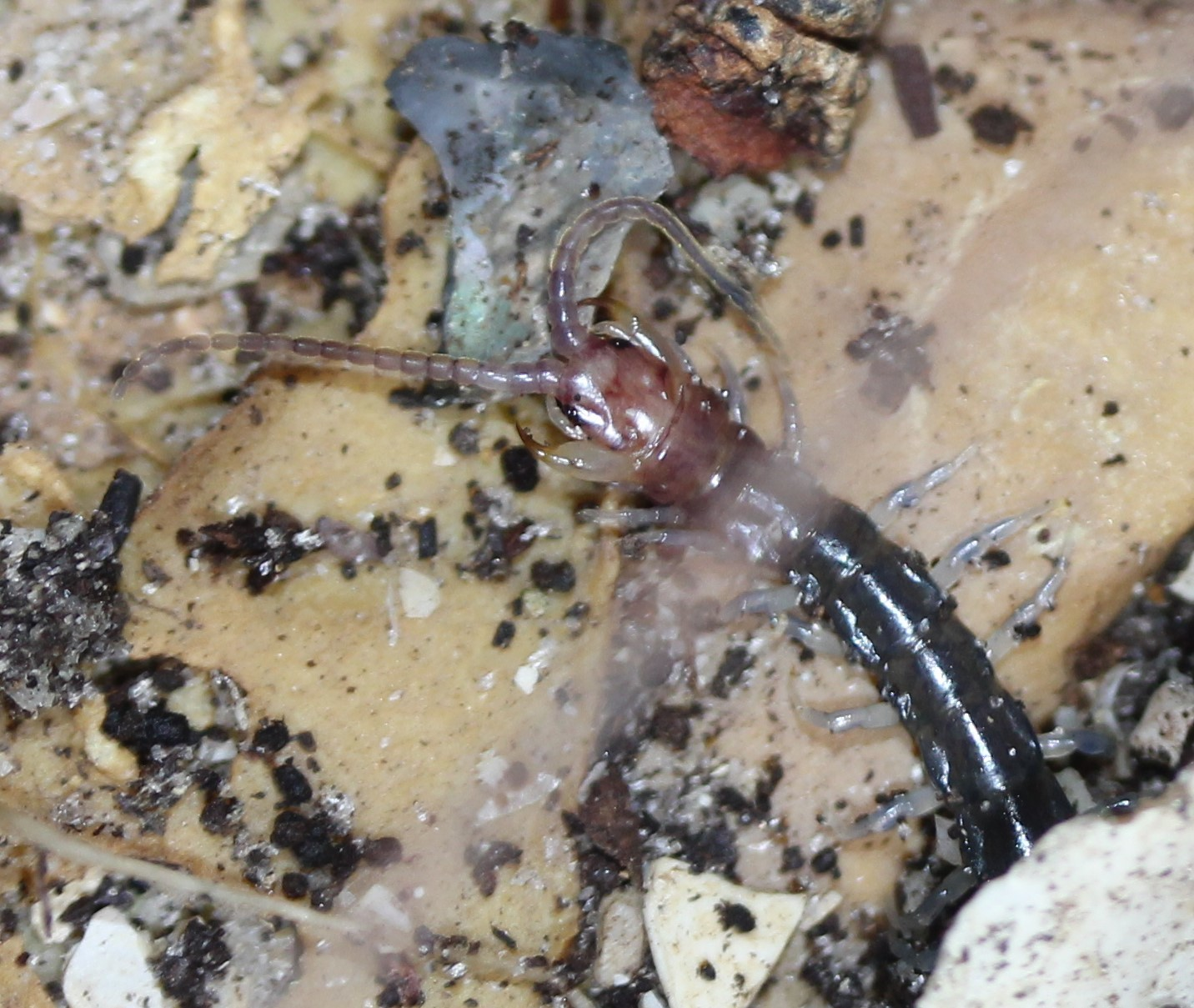
- Rhysida longipes

Scientific classification
- Domain: Eukaryota
- Kingdom: Animalia
- Phylum: Arthropoda
- Subphylum: Myriapoda
- Class: Chilopoda
- Order: Scolopendromorpha
- Family: Scolopendridae
- Subfamily: Otostigminae
- Genus: Rhysida; Wood, 1862

Type species
- Branchiostoma lithobioides Newport, 1845

Synonyms
- Branchiostoma Newport, 1845; Ethmophorus Pocock, 1891; Ptychotrema Peters, 1855; Trematoptychus Peters, 1862

= Rhysida =

Genus of arthropods

Rhysida is a large genus of Scolopendromorph centipedes in the subfamily Otostigminae. It is the second largest genus in the subfamily Otostigminae, with species found in the Neotropics, Indo-Malaya, and Africa. It shares some morphological characteristics with the genus Alluropus, and its phylogeny in the subfamily Otostigminae is somewhat uncertain.

== Species ==
There are about 40 species:

- Rhysida afra (Peters, 1855) (Southern Africa, Bangladesh, Bhutan)
- Rhysida anodonta Lawrence, 1968 (Mozambique)
- Rhysida braziliensis Kraeplin, 1903 (Brazil)
- Rhysida calcarata Pocock, 1891 (Southeast Asia)
- Rhysida carinulata Haase, 1887 (Australasia)
- Rhysida celeris (Humbert & Saussure, 1870) (Latin America) - Blue-Legged Centipede
- Rhysida ceylonica Gravely, 1912 (Sri Lanka)
- Rhysida chacona Verhoeff, 1944 (Argentina)
- Rhysida corbetti Khanna, 1994 (India)
- Rhysida crassispina Kraeplin, 1903 (India)
- Rhysida ikhalama Joshi et al., 2019 (India: Arunachal Pradesh)
- Rhysida immarginata (Porat, 1876) (Congo, Sudan, Indo-Malaya, Latin America)
- Rhysida intermedia Attems, 1910 (Tanzania)
- Rhysida jonesi Lewis, 2002 (Mauritius)
- Rhysida konda Joshi et al., 2019 (India: Orissa)
- Rhysida leviventer Attems,1953 (Laos)
- Rhysida lewisi Joshi et al., 2019 (India: Karnataka)
- Rhysida lithobioides (Newport, 1845) (Somalia, Sumatra)
- Rhysida longicarinulata Khanna & Tripathi, 1986 (India)
- Rhysida longicornis Pocock, 1891 (Socotra)
- Rhysida longipes (Newport, 1845) (Latin America, Florida, Eastern Africa, Chagos Archipelago, Mauritius, East Asia, Indo-Malaysia) - Minor blueleg
- Rhysida manchurica Miyoshi, 1939 (China: Manchuria)
- Rhysida marginata Attems, 1953 (Vietnam)
- Rhysida monalii Khanna & Kumar, 1984 (India: Uttaranchal)
- Rhysida monticola Pocock, 1891 (Sarawak)
- Rhysida neocrassispina Jangi & Dass, 1984 (India: Tamil Nadu)
- Rhysida nuda (Newport, 1845) (Eastern Australia)
- Rhysida pazhuthara Joshi et al., 2019 (India: Kerala)
- Rhysida polyacantha L. E. Koch, 1985 (Australia)
- Rhysida riograndensis Bücherl, 1939 (Brazil)
- Rhysida rubra Bücherl, 1939 (Brazil)
- Rhysida sada Joshi et al., 2019 (India: Maharashtra)
- Rhysida singaporiensis Verhoeff, 1939 (Bali, Singapore)
- Rhysida stuhlmanni Kraeplin, 1903 (East Africa, Malaysia)
- Rhysida suvana Chamberlain, 1920 (Fiji)
- Rhysida togoensis Kraeplin, 1903 (Central Africa)
- Rhysida trispinosa Jangi & Dass, 1984 (India: Maharashtra)
- Rhysida ventrisulcus Attems,1930 (Congo)
- Rhysida yanagiharai Takakuwa, 1935 (Japan?)
