= Cormocephalus novaehollandiae =

Scientific classification
- Kingdom: Animalia
- Phylum: Arthropoda
- Subphylum: Myriapoda
- Class: Chilopoda
- Order: Scolopendromorpha
- Family: Scolopendridae
- Genus: Cormocephalus
- Species: C. novaehollandiae

Binomial name
- Cormocephalus novaehollandiae Kraepelin, 1908

Synonyms
- Hemicormocephalus novaehollandiae Kraepelin, 1908

Species of centipede

Cormocephalus novaehollandiae is a species of centipede in the Scolopendridae family. It is endemic to Australia, and was first described (as Hemicormocephalus novaehollandiae) in 1908 by German naturalist Karl Kraepelin.

== Distribution ==
The species is found in the south-west of Western Australia.

== Behaviour ==
The centipedes are solitary terrestrial predators that inhabit plant litter, soil and rotting wood.
