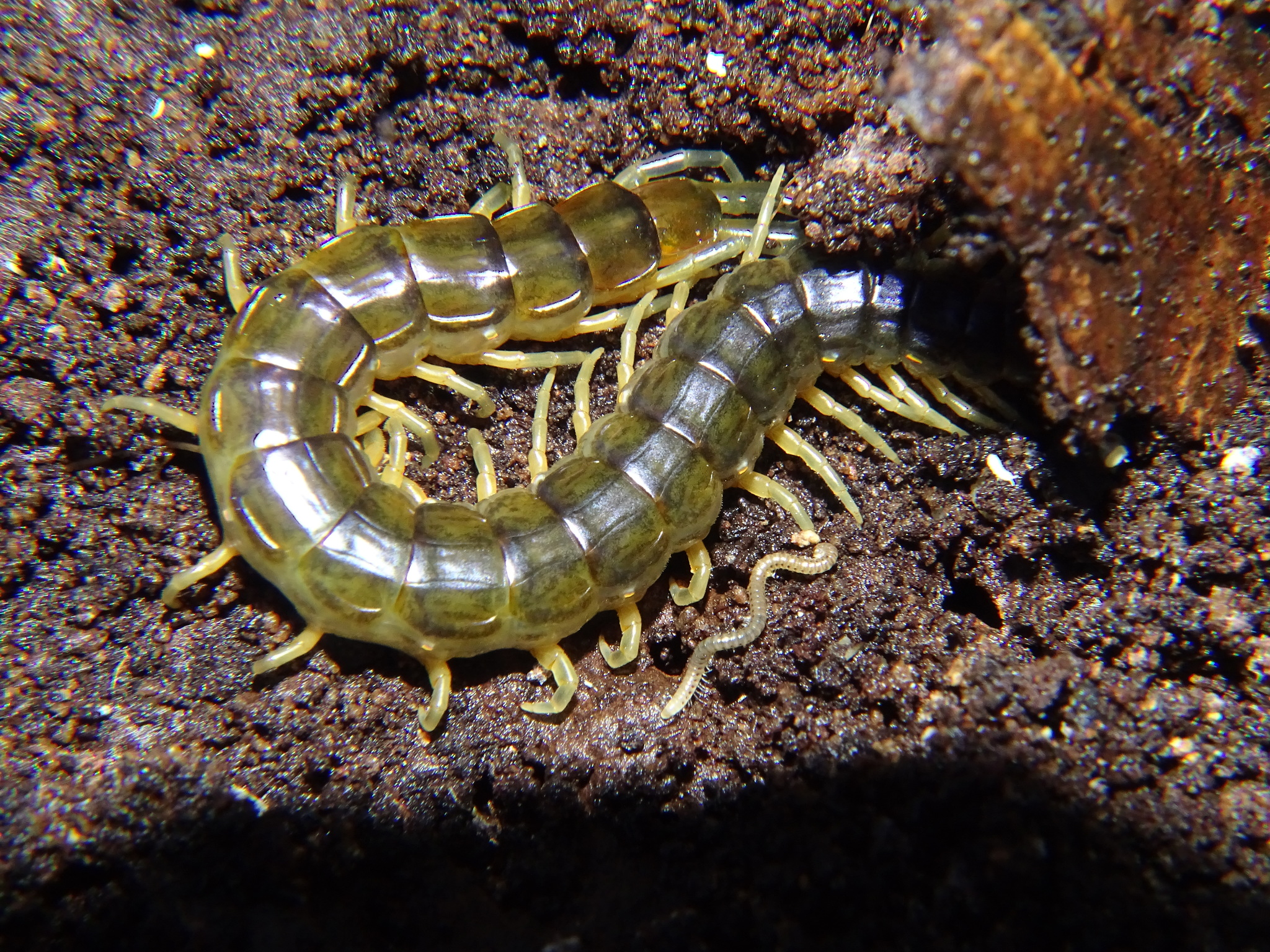
- Cormocephalus rubriceps

Scientific classification
- Kingdom: Animalia
- Phylum: Arthropoda
- Subphylum: Myriapoda
- Class: Chilopoda
- Order: Scolopendromorpha
- Family: Scolopendridae
- Genus: Cormocephalus; Newport, 1844

Type species
- Scolopendra rubriceps Newport, 1843

Synonyms
- Colobopleurus Kraepelin, 1903; Cupipes Kohlrausch, 1878; Hemicormocephalus Kraepelin, 1903; Perustigmus Verhoeff, 1941

= Cormocephalus =

Genus of centipedes

Cormocephalus is a genus of centipedes of the family Scolopendridae, containing the following species:

- Cormocephalus abundantis González-Sponga, 2000
- Cormocephalus aeruginosus Attems, 1928
- Cormocephalus albidus Kraepelin, 1903
- Cormocephalus amazonae (R. Chamberlin, 1914)
- Cormocephalus ambiguus (Brandt, 1841)
- Cormocephalus amphieurys (Kohlrausch, 1878)
- Cormocephalus andinus (Kraepelin, 1903)
- Cormocephalus anechinus (Chamberlin, 1957)
- Cormocephalus arantsoae Saussure & Zehntner, 1902
- Cormocephalus aurantiipes (Newport, 1844)
- Cormocephalus bevianus Lawrence, 1960
- Cormocephalus bonaerius Attems, 1928
- Cormocephalus brachyceras L. E. Koch, 1983
- Cormocephalus brasiliensis Humbert & Saussure, 1870
- Cormocephalus brevicornis Kraepelin, 1903
- Cormocephalus brincki Lawrence, 1955
- Cormocephalus bungalbinensis L. E. Koch, 1983
- Cormocephalus büttneri Kraepelin, 1903
- Cormocephalus cognatus Ribaut, 1923
- Cormocephalus coynei L. E. Koch, 1984
- Cormocephalus cupipes Pocock, 1891
- Cormocephalus delta Edgecombe & Waldock, 2019
- Cormocephalus denticaudus Jangi & Dass, 1984
- Cormocephalus dentipes Pocock, 1891
- Cormocephalus deventeri Lawrence, 1970
- Cormocephalus devylderi Porat, 1893
- Cormocephalus edithae González-Sponga, 2000
- Cormocephalus elegans Kraepelin 1903
- Cormocephalus esulcatus Pocock, 1901
- Cormocephalus facilis González-Sponga, 2000
- Cormocephalus ferox Saussure & Zehntner, 1902
- Cormocephalus flavescens Kraepelin, 1903
- Cormocephalus fontinalis (Attems, 1928)
- Cormocephalus gervaisianus (C. L. Koch, 1841)
- Cormocephalus glabratus González-Sponga, 2000
- Cormocephalus gracilipes Saussure & Zehntner, 1902
- Cormocephalus granulipes Lawrence, 1958
- Cormocephalus granulosus Ribaut, 1923
- Cormocephalus guildingii Newport, 1845
- Cormocephalus hartmeyeri Kraepelin, 1908
- Cormocephalus hirtipes (Ribaut, 1923)
- Cormocephalus humilis Attems, 1928
- Cormocephalus impressus Porat, 1876
- Cormocephalus impulsus Lewis, 1989
- Cormocephalus incongruens Kraepelin, 1903
- Cormocephalus inermipes Pocock, 1891
- Cormocephalus inermis (Kraepelin, 1916)
- Cormocephalus inopinatus (Kraepelin, 1908)
- Cormocephalus insulanus Attems, 1928
- Cormocephalus katangensis Goffinet, 1969
- Cormocephalus kraepelini Attems, 1930
- Cormocephalus laevipes Pocock, 1891
- Cormocephalus lineatus Newport, 1845
- Cormocephalus lissadellensis L. E. Koch, 1983
- Cormocephalus longipes Ribaut, 1923
- Cormocephalus macrosestrus (Attems, 1928)
- Cormocephalus maritimo González-Sponga, 2000
- Cormocephalus mecistopus Brolemann, 1922
- Cormocephalus mecutinus Attems, 1928
- Cormocephalus mediosulcatus Attems, 1928
- Cormocephalus milloti R. F. Lawrence, 1960
- Cormocephalus minor Chamberlin, 1927
- Cormocephalus mixtus (Ribaut, 1923)
- Cormocephalus monilicornis Wood, 1862
- Cormocephalus monteithi L. E. Koch, 1983
- Cormocephalus multispinosus Attems, 1909
- Cormocephalus multispinus (Kraepelin, 1903)
- Cormocephalus mundus Chamberlin, 1955
- Cormocephalus neocaledonicus (Kraepelin, 1903)
- Cormocephalus nigrificatus Verhoeff, 1937
- Cormocephalus nitidus Porat, 1871
- Cormocephalus novaehollandiae (Kraepelin, 1908)
- Cormocephalus nudipes Jangi & Dass, 1984
- Cormocephalus oligoporus Kraepelin, 1903
- Cormocephalus pallidus Silvestri, 1899
- Cormocephalus papuanus Attems, 1914
- Cormocephalus parcespinatus Porat, 1893
- Cormocephalus philippinensis Kraepelin, 1903
- Cormocephalus pilosus Jangi, 1955
- Cormocephalus pontifex Attems, 1928
- Cormocephalus pseudopunctatus Kraepelin, 1903
- Cormocephalus punctatus Porat, 1871
- Cormocephalus pustulatus Kraepelin, 1903
- Cormocephalus pygmaeus Pocock, 1892
- Cormocephalus pyropygus Edgecombe & Waldock, 2019
- Cormocephalus rhodesianus Lawrence, 1955
- Cormocephalus rubriceps (Newport, 1843)
- Cormocephalus rugosus Ribaut, 1923
- Cormocephalus sagmus Edgecombe & Waldock, 2019
- Cormocephalus setiger Porat, 1871
- Cormocephalus similis L. E. Koch, 1983
- Cormocephalus spinosior L. E. Koch, 1983
- Cormocephalus strigosus Kraepelin, 1908
- Cormocephalus subspinulosus Machado, 1951
- Cormocephalus tingonus Chamberlin, 1957
- Cormocephalus tricuspis Kraepelin, 1916
- Cormocephalus tumidus Lawrence, 1960
- Cormocephalus turneri Pocock, 1901
- Cormocephalus ungueserratus Verhoeff, 1941
- Cormocephalus ungulatus (Meinert, 1886)
- Cormocephalus venezuelianus (Brölemann, 1898)
- Cormocephalus westangelasensis L. E. Koch, 1983
- Cormocephalus westwoodi (Newport, 1844)
