= Rhysida celeris =

Scientific classification
- Domain: Eukaryota
- Kingdom: Animalia
- Phylum: Arthropoda
- Subphylum: Myriapoda
- Class: Chilopoda
- Order: Scolopendromorpha
- Family: Scolopendridae
- Genus: Rhysida
- Species: R. celeris

Binomial name
- Rhysida celeris (Humbert & Saussure, 1870)

Synonyms
- List: Branchiostoma celer Humbert & Saussure, 1870; Trematoptychus celeris Chamberlin, 1914; R. c. andina Bücherl, 1953; R. caripensis Gonzaléz-Sponga, 2002; R. neoespartana Gonzaléz-Sponga, 2002; R. guayanica Gonzaléz-Sponga, 2002; R. maritima Gonzaléz-Sponga, 2002; R. monaguensis Gonzaléz-Sponga, 2002; R. porlamerensis Gonzaléz-Sponga, 2002; R. sucupanensis Gonzaléz-Sponga, 2002

Species of centipede

Rhysida celeris, the blue-legged centipede, is a species of centipede in the subfamily Otostigminae. It is found across Latin America and the Caribbean islands. It is one of the most common and widespread species of its genus in the neotropical region, and sometimes enters houses. It can be found at a variety of altitudes, from sea level to mountains 1250 m above sea level.

== Appearance ==
Amazonas Chagas-Júnior described the colouration of the centipede thus: "General body color light blue or olive green, sternites and legs light blue or yellowish; prefemur and femur of the ultimate legs light blue, sometimes tibiae and tarsi are pale."

Rhysida celeris is a smallish species, growing between 4 and 7 centimetres (1.6 and 2.8 in) in length. Its antennae are flexible, and long, and are divided into 17 to 21 segments. The first three segments of the antennae are hairless, the remaining ones are densely bristly. Its head (cephalic plate) is slightly wider than long, and smooth except for a median groove. The ultimate legs are long and thin, measuring up to 2.2 centimetres (0.87 in).

Rhysida celeris can be distinguished from Rhysida brasiliensis, a morphologically similar species, by the sutures on its segments and the length of the ultimate legs.
