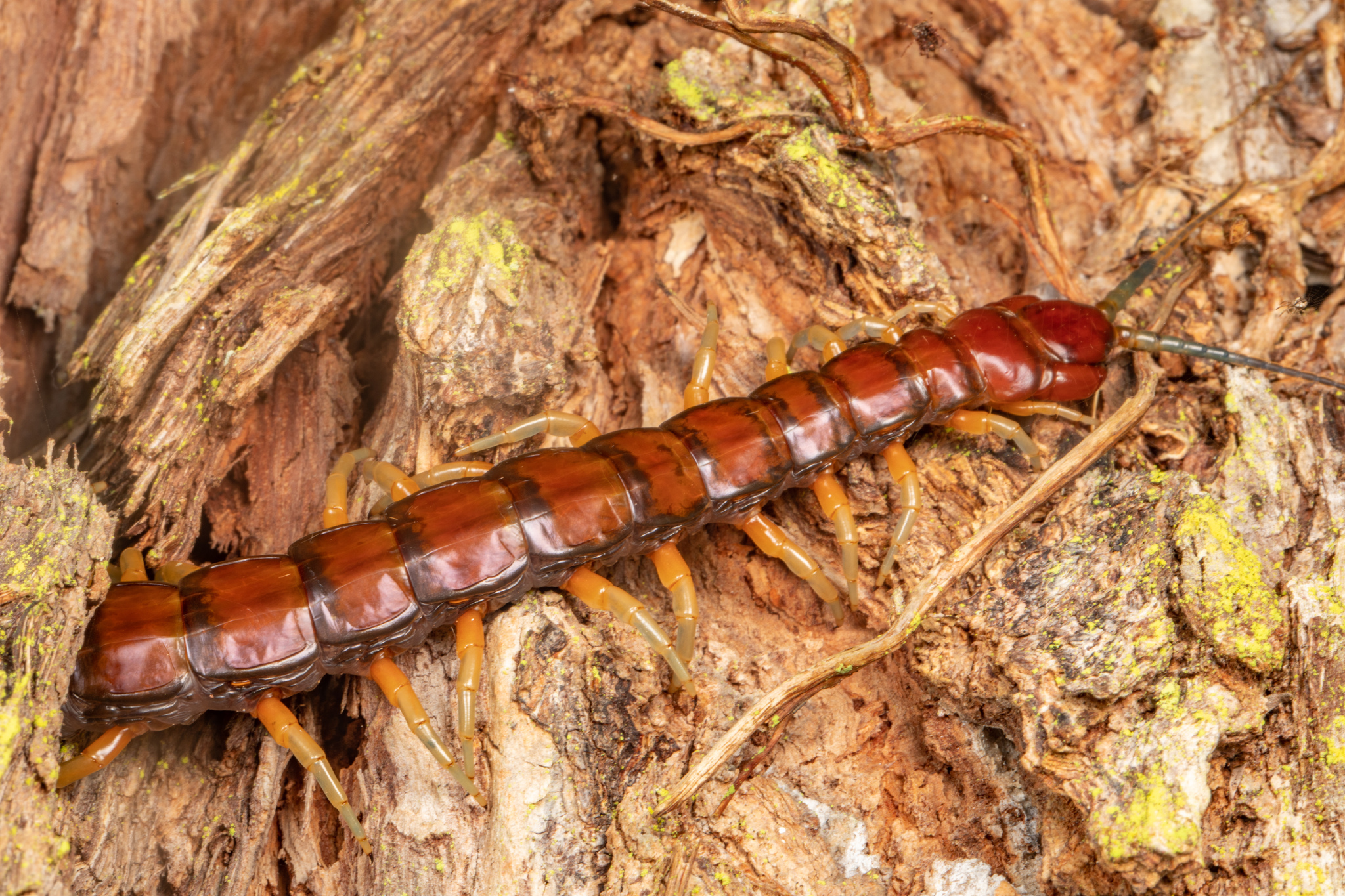

Scientific classification
- Kingdom: Animalia
- Phylum: Arthropoda
- Subphylum: Myriapoda
- Class: Chilopoda
- Order: Scolopendromorpha
- Family: Scolopendridae
- Genus: Cormocephalus
- Species: C. rubriceps

Binomial name
- Cormocephalus rubriceps (Newport, 1843)

Synonyms
- Scolopendra rubriceps Newport, 1843; Cormocephalus rubriceps rubrlceps Attems, 1930

= Cormocephalus rubriceps =

Species of arthropod

Cormocephalus rubriceps, commonly known as hura or giant centipede, is a species of centipede that can reach up to 20 centimetres (8 in) in length. They are native to Australia and New Zealand. In Australia, they occur in several pockets throughout the country whilst in New Zealand they occur only in the North Island. It was first described in 1843 by English entomologist George Newport. They typically occur in damp habitat such as rotting logs, but occasionally occur in caves. They are predators that will feed on a range of invertebrates and small reptiles. When threatened, they can inflict a painful bite. In New Zealand, they are preyed upon by introduced pest species such as rats and hedgehogs. As such, they are most abundant in areas where these pests are not present, such as offshore islands.

== Taxonomy ==
C. rubriceps was originally described as Scolopendra rubriceps in 1843 by English entomologist George Newport. The type specimen was deposited in the Natural History Museum of London. In 1845, Newport published a more detailed description of the species, in which it was moved to the genus Cormocephalus. C. rubriceps has undergone numerous taxonomic revisions which just added more detail to the morphological descriptions of the species. They were most recently revised in 1983. C. rubriceps are members of the family Scolopendridae, a diverse group of large centipedes. They are commonly called "Hura" in Māori and "giant centipede" in English.

== Description ==
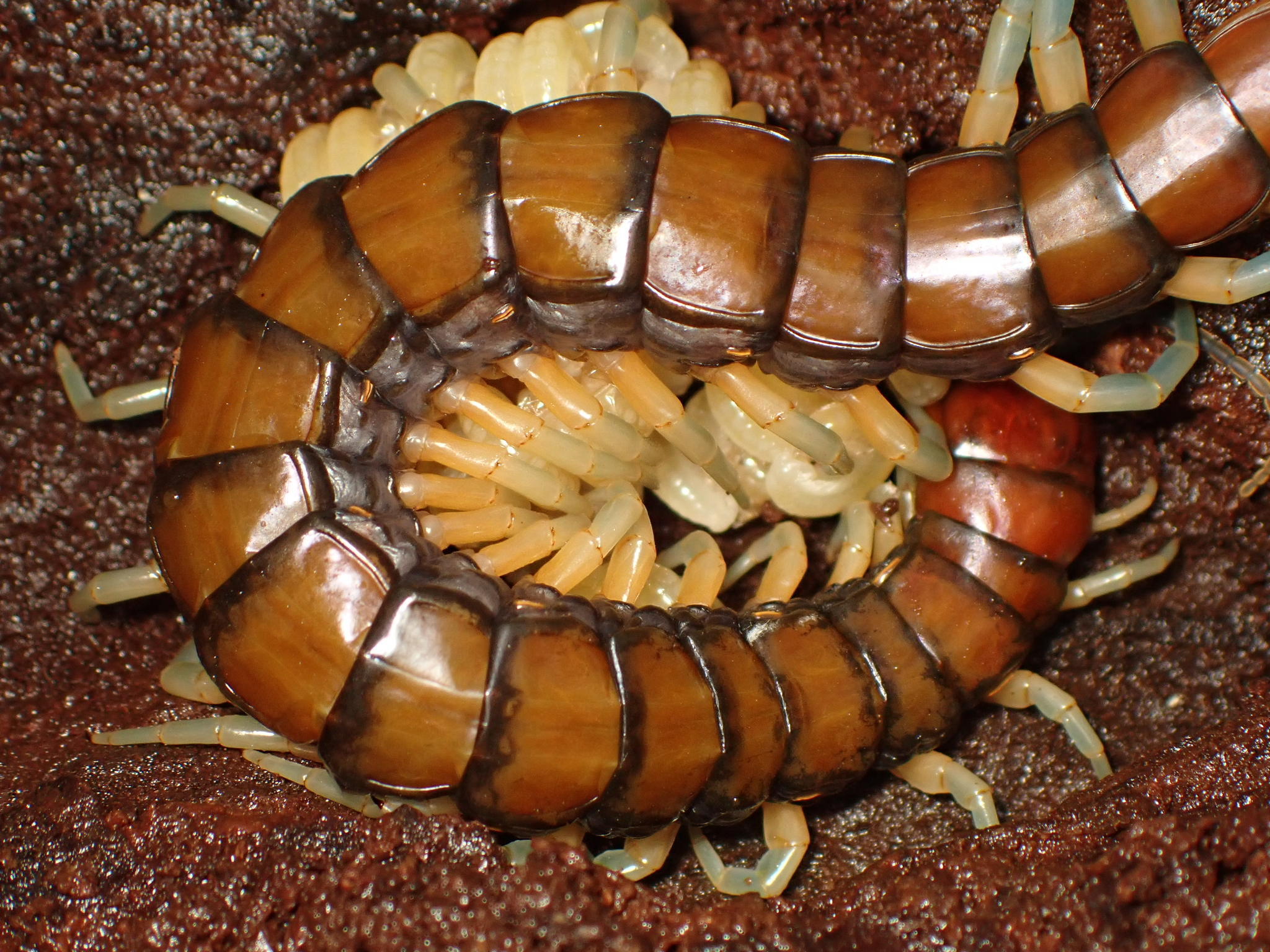
Cormocephalus rubriceps female guarding eggs.

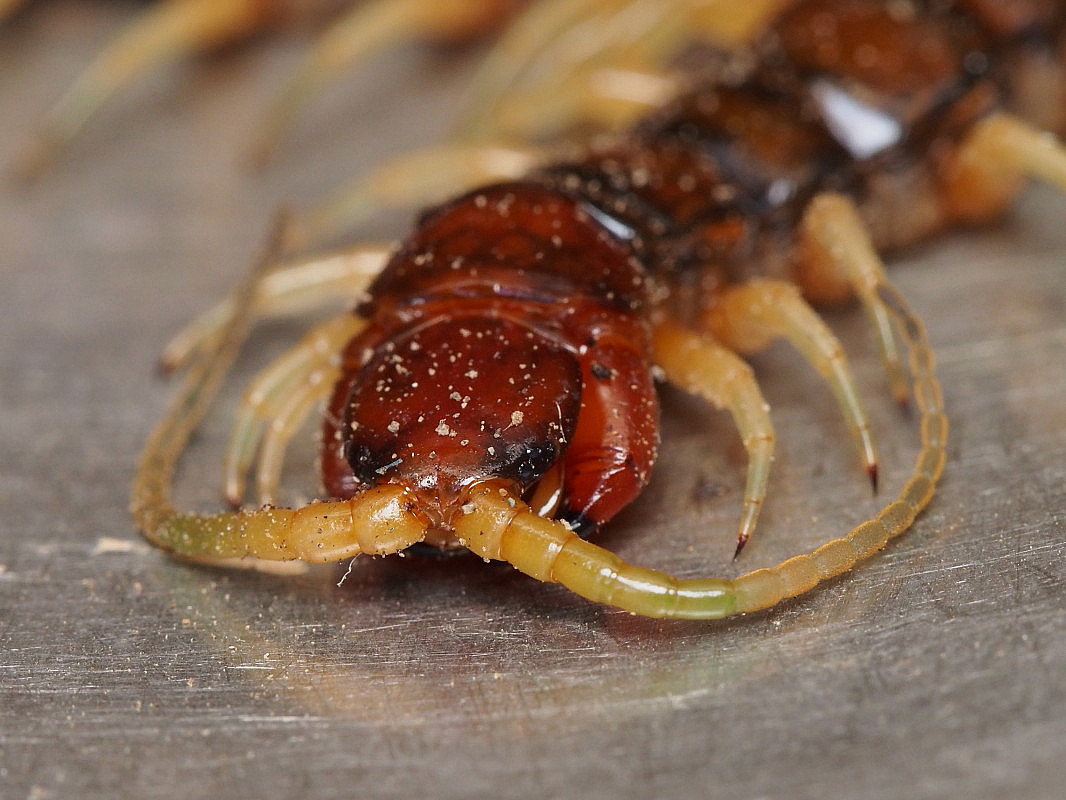
Cormocephalus rubriceps head.

They are a very large species, sometimes exceeding 20 centimetres (8 in) in length. However, in Australia they are considerably smaller, usually reaching a maximum of 3.9 centimetres (1.5 in) in length. There are 21 tergites (upper plates of the body) and sternites (lower plates of the body). The head and first tergite are reddish-brown, while the other tergites are olive-brown. There are two grooves on the head that begin at the base of the head and stop just before the middle. They have large black forcipules, which are fang-like appendages. The antennae are long, having seventeen segments, with the first five being smooth and the rest hairy. The first tergite is smooth save for sparse punctures, whilst the other tergites (up the twentieth) have a faint pair of grooves running lengthwise down their surface. The legs are yellowish at the base, but turn green towards the tip. The ultimate legs have light blue tips. There are two spines at the base of the leg claws. The second leg segment of the ultimate legs is missing several rows of spines that are present in some Cormocephalus.

=== Physiology ===
One study found that the haemolymph (blood-like fluids) of C. rubriceps have a high concentration of protein and moderate amounts of carbohydrates. It was also found that there were high concentrations of sodium and chlorine ions while potassium, calcium, magnesium and phosphate ions were relatively rare. It was suggested that this sort of haemolymph composition is typical of more "primitive" arthropods. There were also high amounts of cysteine (an amino acid that forms proteins), which may be characteristic of myriapod haemolymph.

When threatened, C. rubriceps can use their sharp forcipules to inflict a bite that can cause swelling, and in one case, "severe pain" accompanied by vomiting.

== Distribution and habitat ==
C. rubriceps are native to New Zealand and Australia. In Australia, they are recorded from around Perth in the west, Adelaide in the south, and Sydney and Brisbane in the east. They were previously recorded in Tasmania, but this appears to be an error. Within New Zealand, they are widespread in the North Island, including some offshore islands such as Manawatāwhi / Three Kings Islands and Poor Knights Islands. On Great Island in Three Kings, they are reportedly so common that some researchers visiting the island had to surround their sleeping bags with tinfoil to alert them to the centipede's presence.

They live in damp habitat such as in rotten logs and leaf litter. However, they are also occasionally found in caves and may be considered trogloxenes, meaning they are able to live in this environment, but cannot permanently reside there.

== Ecology and behaviour ==
Like all centipedes, C. rubriceps are predators. In captivity, they will feed on orthopterans such as the tree wētā Hemideina thoracica, Caedicia simplex (a species of katydid) and Teleogryllus commodus (black field cricket). They will also feed on other groups of invertebrates such as spiders, moths, earwigs and other centipedes. In nature, they will reportedly even prey upon small reptiles. One study proposed that they may even feed upon young Tuatara. The females are also protective of their young. In one study, they reportedly caught their prey by raising the rear section of their body and grabbing approaching prey with their hind legs. Once they grabbed the prey, they curled their bodies around, bit into it and began feeding. In another study, they also caught their prey with their legs, suspending the prey upside down, before feeding on it. When finished, very little remained of their prey.

In New Zealand, C. rubriceps are known to be eaten by exotic pest species such as Polynesian rats, Norway rats and European hedgehogs. Because of this, they tend to be most abundant in places where such predators have been eradicated or never established in the first place, such as island habitats. They are also known to be preyed upon by North Island brown kiwi.
