= Cormocephalus laevipes =

Scientific classification
- Kingdom: Animalia
- Phylum: Arthropoda
- Subphylum: Myriapoda
- Class: Chilopoda
- Order: Scolopendromorpha
- Family: Scolopendridae
- Genus: Cormocephalus
- Species: C. laevipes

Binomial name
- Cormocephalus laevipes Pocock, 1891

Species of centipede

Cormocephalus laevipes is a species of centipede in the Scolopendridae family. It was first described in 1891 by British zoologist Reginald Innes Pocock.

== Distribution ==
The species is found on Australia’s Lord Howe Island in the Tasman Sea, and in the Solomon Islands.

== Behaviour ==
The centipedes are solitary terrestrial predators that inhabit plant litter, soil and rotting wood.
