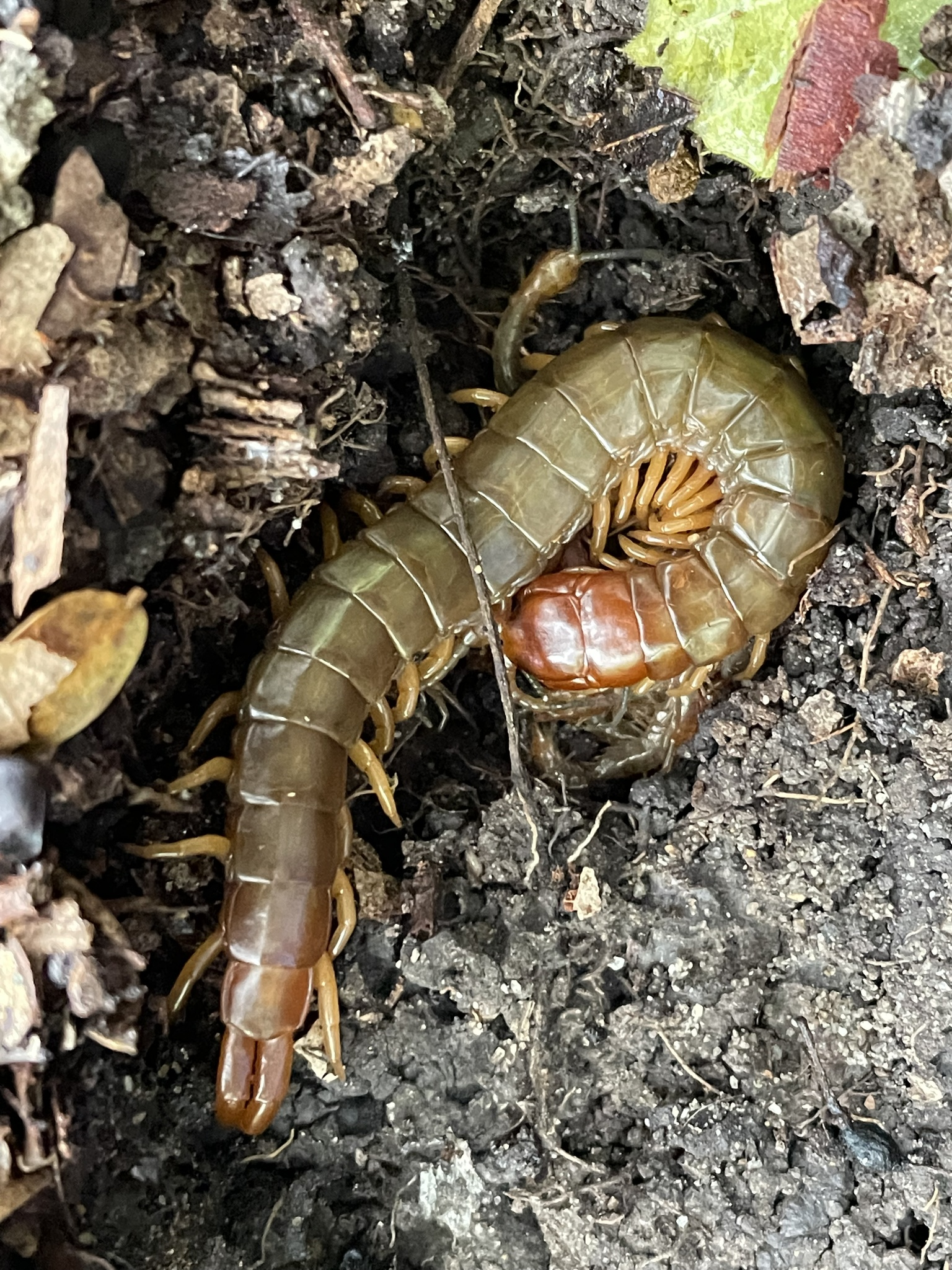
- Cormocephalus brachyceras adult with juveniles

Scientific classification
- Domain: Eukaryota
- Kingdom: Animalia
- Phylum: Arthropoda
- Subphylum: Myriapoda
- Class: Chilopoda
- Order: Scolopendromorpha
- Family: Scolopendridae
- Genus: Cormocephalus
- Species: C. brachyceras

Binomial name
- Cormocephalus brachyceras L. E. Koch, 1983

= Cormocephalus brachyceras =

Species of centipede

Cormocephalus brachyceras is an Australian species of centipede. It is a medium-sized centipede, averaging around 100 millimetres (3.9 in) in length. It is commonly found around south-east Queensland and north-east New South Wales, under logs and rocks in a variety of habitats.
