= Rhysida immarginata =

Scientific classification
- Domain: Eukaryota
- Kingdom: Animalia
- Phylum: Arthropoda
- Subphylum: Myriapoda
- Class: Chilopoda
- Order: Scolopendromorpha
- Family: Scolopendridae
- Genus: Rhysida
- Species: R. immarginata

Binomial name
- Rhysida immarginata (Porat, 1876)

Synonyms
- Branchiostoma gymnopus Kohlrausch, 1878; Branchiostoma indicum Kohlrausch, 1878; Branchiostoma subspinosum Tömösváry, 1885; Rhysida nuda brevicornis Wang, 1951; Rhysida nuda brevicornuta Wang, 1951; Branchiostoma immarginata celebense Haase, 1887

Species of centipede

Rhysida immarginata is a species of centipedes in the family Scolopendridae. The species has been found in Africa (Sudan and Democratic Republic of the Congo), in South America (Cuba, El Salvador, Nicaragua and Guatemala) and in Sri Lanka.
