= Cormocephalus dentipes =

Scientific classification
- Kingdom: Animalia
- Phylum: Arthropoda
- Subphylum: Myriapoda
- Class: Chilopoda
- Order: Scolopendromorpha
- Family: Scolopendridae
- Genus: Cormocephalus
- Species: C. dentipes

Binomial name
- Cormocephalus dentipes Pocock, 1891

Synonyms
- Cormocephalus pseudonudipes Jangi & Dass, 1984

Species of centipede

Cormocephalus dentipes is a species of centipede in the family Scolopendridae.
