= Rhysida polyacantha =

Scientific classification
- Kingdom: Animalia
- Phylum: Arthropoda
- Subphylum: Myriapoda
- Class: Chilopoda
- Order: Scolopendromorpha
- Family: Scolopendridae
- Genus: Rhysida
- Species: R. polyacantha

Binomial name
- Rhysida polyacantha L.E.Koch, 1985

Species of centipede

Rhysida polyacantha is a species of centipede in the Scolopendridae family. It is endemic to Australia, and was first described in 1985 by L. E. Koch.

== Distribution ==
The species occurs in the Northern Territory, Queensland and Western Australia.

== Behaviour ==
The centipedes are solitary terrestrial predators that inhabit plant litter, soil and rotting wood.
