= Arthrorhabdus mjobergi =

Scientific classification
- Kingdom: Animalia
- Phylum: Arthropoda
- Subphylum: Myriapoda
- Class: Chilopoda
- Order: Scolopendromorpha
- Family: Scolopendridae
- Genus: Arthrorhabdus
- Species: A. mjobergi

Binomial name
- Arthrorhabdus mjobergi Kraepelin, 1916

Species of centipede

Arthrorhabdus mjobergi is a species of centipede in the Scolopendridae family. It is endemic to Australia, and was first described in 1916 by German naturalist Karl Kraepelin from material collected by Swedish zoologist and explorer Eric Mjöberg. It is a relatively small species, averaging 38 millimetres in length, with a pale brownish-yellow body, reddish-brown head, and variably coloured last segment and back legs. Its notable characteristics include short, 17-segmented antennae, mouthparts with 4 or 5 large outward-facing teeth, body segments with distinct median indentations, and varied leg features such as bristles at the base of claws on the first 20 pairs and 2 to 5 spines on the last pair.

== Description ==
Arthrorhabdus mjobergi is a relatively small species, with an average body length of 38 millimetres. It exhibits a colour pattern of pale brownish-yellow body segments, reddish-brown head, and the last body segment and the pair of legs at the back may vary between brownish to light orangish or greenish yellow. The head features a short median indentation between the bases of the antennae, which are not densely covered with hair at the base. These antennae are quite short, typically extending no further than the second body segment, and they are composed of 17 segments.

The mouthparts have a set of 4, or occasionally 5, large outward-facing teeth, and the base plates on these mouthparts are smooth. The mouthparts also feature a large, wide tooth-like process. The segments of the body have a pair of complete median indentations starting from the fourth segment. These centipedes usually have lateral margins only on the last body segment, which is slightly longer than its width. This last segment has a strongly convex posterior edge and it sometimes features a median indentation.

The legs of Arthrorhabdus mjobergi show some morphological variability, with the first 20 pairs having long bristles at the base of their claws, while the last pair often lacks these bristles, though exceptions exist. The claws of the first 20 pairs of legs are about half the length of the last segment of the leg, while the claws on the last pair of legs are approximately three-quarters of this length. The last pair of legs have a moderately narrow coxopleuron, a process of moderate size, and two to four, sometimes up to five, small, straight spines at the apex. The regenerative legs of this species usually have one or two non-process spines.

== Distribution ==
The species occurs in Western Australia, the Northern Territory, South Australia and Queensland.

== Behaviour ==
The centipedes are solitary terrestrial predators that inhabit plant litter, soil and rotting wood.
