= Rhysida suvana =

Scientific classification
- Kingdom: Animalia
- Phylum: Arthropoda
- Subphylum: Myriapoda
- Class: Chilopoda
- Order: Scolopendromorpha
- Family: Scolopendridae
- Genus: Rhysida
- Species: R. suvana

Binomial name
- Rhysida suvana Chamberlin, 1920

Species of centipede

Rhysida suvana is a species of centipede in the Scolopendridae family. It was described in 1920 by American myriapodologist Ralph Vary Chamberlin.

== Distribution ==
The species occurs in Fiji. The type locality is Suva.
