= Rhysida carinulata =

Scientific classification
- Kingdom: Animalia
- Phylum: Arthropoda
- Subphylum: Myriapoda
- Class: Chilopoda
- Order: Scolopendromorpha
- Family: Scolopendridae
- Genus: Rhysida
- Species: R. carinulata

Binomial name
- Rhysida carinulata (Haase, 1887)

Synonyms
- Branchiotrema carinulatum Haase, 1887; Branchiotrema carinulatum efflata Haase, 1887; Branchiotrema carinulatum australicum Haase, 1887

Species of centipede

Rhysida carinulata is a species of centipede in the Scolopendridae family. It is found in Australia and New Guinea, and was first described in 1887 by German entomologist Erich Haase.

== Distribution ==
The species occurs in north-eastern coastal Queensland as well as in New Guinea.

== Behaviour ==
The centipedes are solitary terrestrial predators that inhabit plant litter, soil and rotting wood.
