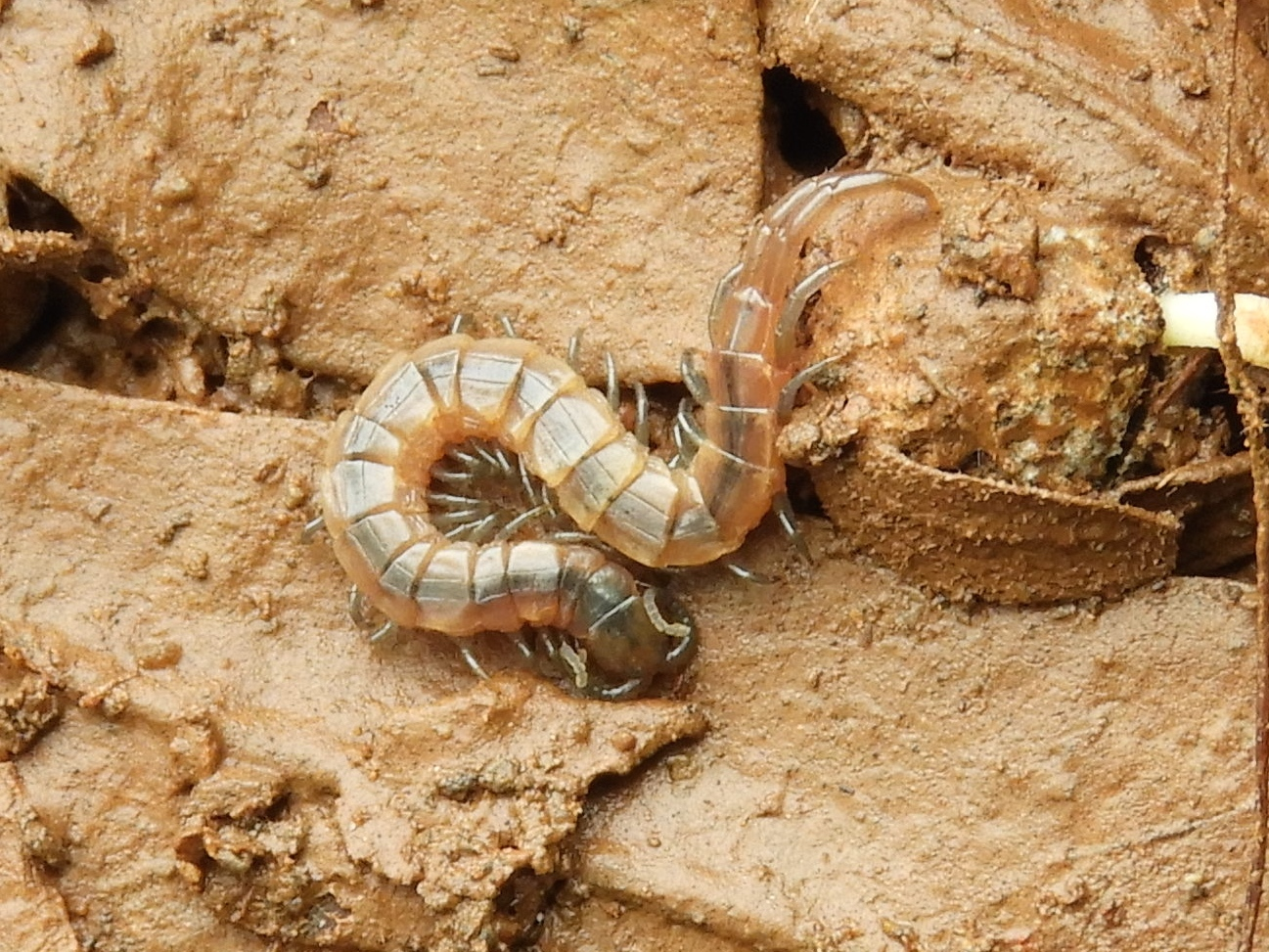
- Arthrorhabdus pygmaeus

Scientific classification
- Kingdom: Animalia
- Phylum: Arthropoda
- Subphylum: Myriapoda
- Class: Chilopoda
- Order: Scolopendromorpha
- Family: Scolopendridae
- Subfamily: Scolopendrinae
- Genus: Arthrorhabdus; Pocock, 1891

Type species
- Arthrorhabdus formosus Pocock, 1891

Synonyms
- Arthrorhabdinus Verhoeff, 1907

= Arthrorhabdus =

Centipede genus

Arthrorhabdus, from the Greek ἄρθρον, a joint, and ῥάβδος, a staff, is a genus of Scolopendrid centipede in the subfamily Scolopendrinae. Species are found in Mexico and the Southern United States (A. pygmaeus), Australia (A. paucispinus & A. mjöbergi), and South Africa (A. formosus). Since a reapprasial in the genus in 2010, the genus only has four species. It may be polyphyletic.

== Taxonomic history ==
- 1891: Genus described by Reginald Innes Pocock, with one species (A. formosus). (Notes on the Syonymy of some Species of Scolopendridæ, with Descriptions of new Genera and Species of the Group)
- 2004: A. spinifer moved to genus Rhoda by Rowland M. Shelley and Amazonas Chagas Junior. (THE CENTIPEDE GENUS ARTHRORHABDUS POCOCK, 1891, IN THE WESTERN HEMISPHERE: POTENTIAL OCCURRENCE OF A. PYGMAEUS (POCOCK, 1895) IN BELIZE)
- 2010: Reappraisal by John G. E. Lewis removes A. jonesii and A. somalus from the genus, renaming the latter Scolopendra somala. (A key and annotated list of the Scolopendra species of the Old World with a reappraisal of Arthrorhabdus)

== Identification and morphology ==
Arthrorhabdus species bear several morphological similarities to those of the genus Cormocephalus: their spiracles, eyes, and mouthparts are the same. It also resembles members of the genera Scolopendra and Asanada, but can be differentiated from other genera by a variety of characteristics, specifically the head not overlapping the first tergite, additionally from Scolopendra by the shape of the mouthparts and spiracles, and further from Cormocephalus by morphological features on the legs.

Arthrorhabdus species have between 18 and 26 antennomeres (antennae segments).

== Species ==
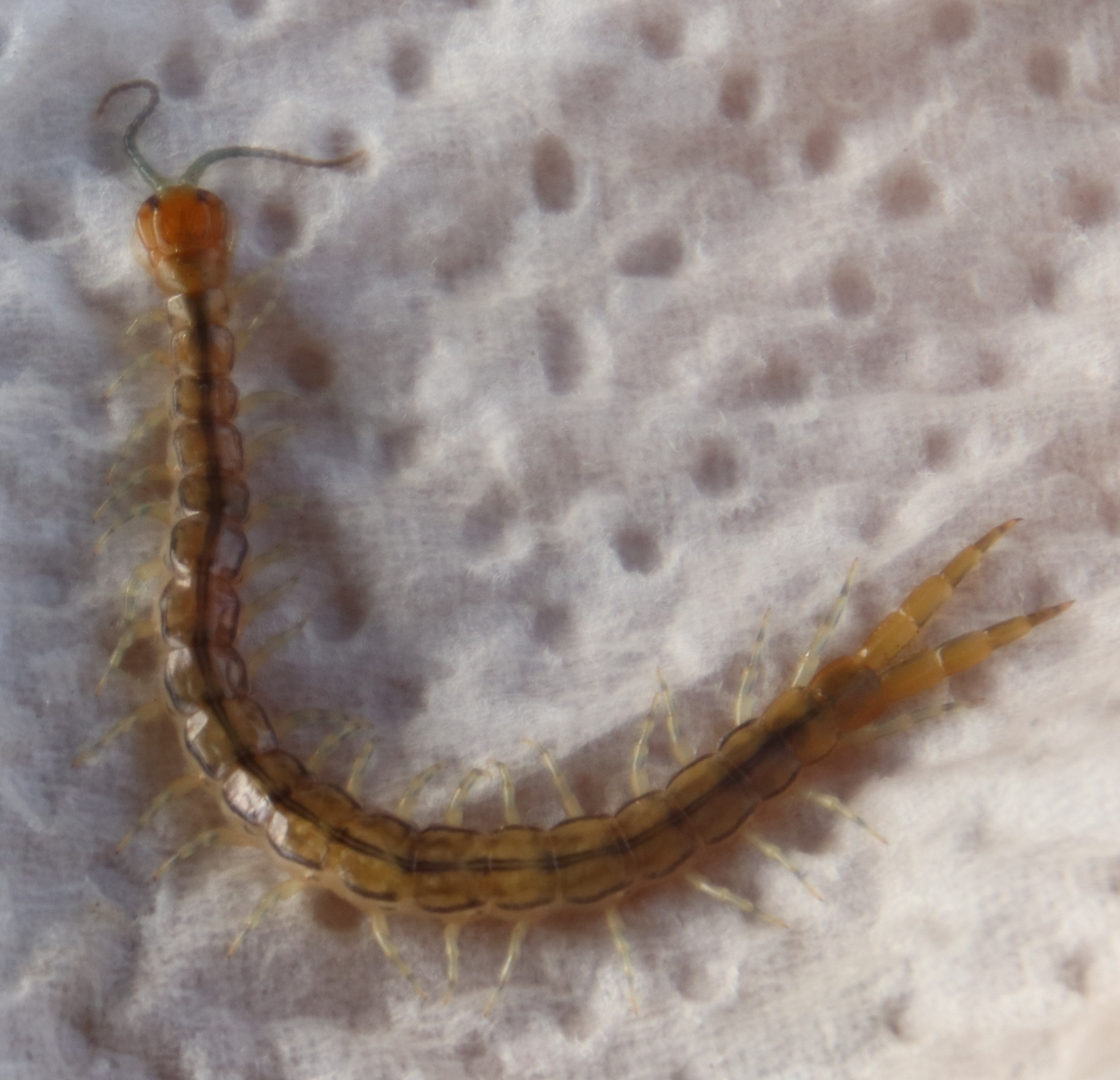
Arthorhabdus formosus

- Arthrorhabdus formosus Pocock, 1891 - South Africa.
- Arthrorhabdus mjobergi Kraepelin, 1916 - Australia.
- Arthrorhabdus paucispinus L.E.Koch, 1984 - Australia
- Arthrorhabdus pygmaeus Pocock, 1895 - s USA, Mexico, possibly Belize.
