= Cormocephalus westangelasensis =

Scientific classification
- Kingdom: Animalia
- Phylum: Arthropoda
- Subphylum: Myriapoda
- Class: Chilopoda
- Order: Scolopendromorpha
- Family: Scolopendridae
- Genus: Cormocephalus
- Species: C. westangelasensis

Binomial name
- Cormocephalus westangelasensis L.E.Koch, 1983

Species of centipede

Cormocephalus westangelasensis is a species of centipede in the Scolopendridae family. It is endemic to Australia, and was first described in 1983 by L. E. Koch.

== Distribution ==
The species is found in Western Australia.

== Behaviour ==
The centipedes are solitary terrestrial predators that inhabit plant litter, soil and rotting wood.
