= Cormocephalus esulcatus =

Scientific classification
- Kingdom: Animalia
- Phylum: Arthropoda
- Subphylum: Myriapoda
- Class: Chilopoda
- Order: Scolopendromorpha
- Family: Scolopendridae
- Genus: Cormocephalus
- Species: C. esulcatus

Binomial name
- Cormocephalus esulcatus Pocock, 1901

Species of centipede

Cormocephalus esulcatus is a species of centipede in the Scolopendridae family. It is found in Australia and South Africa, and was first described in 1901 by British zoologist Reginald Innes Pocock.

== Distribution ==
In Australia the species is found in New South Wales and Victoria.

== Behaviour ==
The centipedes are solitary terrestrial predators that inhabit plant litter, soil and rotting wood.
