= Cormocephalus pyropygus =

Scientific classification
- Kingdom: Animalia
- Phylum: Arthropoda
- Subphylum: Myriapoda
- Class: Chilopoda
- Order: Scolopendromorpha
- Family: Scolopendridae
- Genus: Cormocephalus
- Species: C. pyropygus

Binomial name
- Cormocephalus pyropygus Edgecombe & Waldock, 2019

Species of centipede

Cormocephalus pyropygus is a species of centipede in the Scolopendridae family. It is endemic to Australia, and was first described in 2019.

== Distribution and habitat ==
The species occurs in the Fortescue River valley, in the Pilbara region of north-west Western Australia. The centipedes are blind and occupy subterranean habitats.
