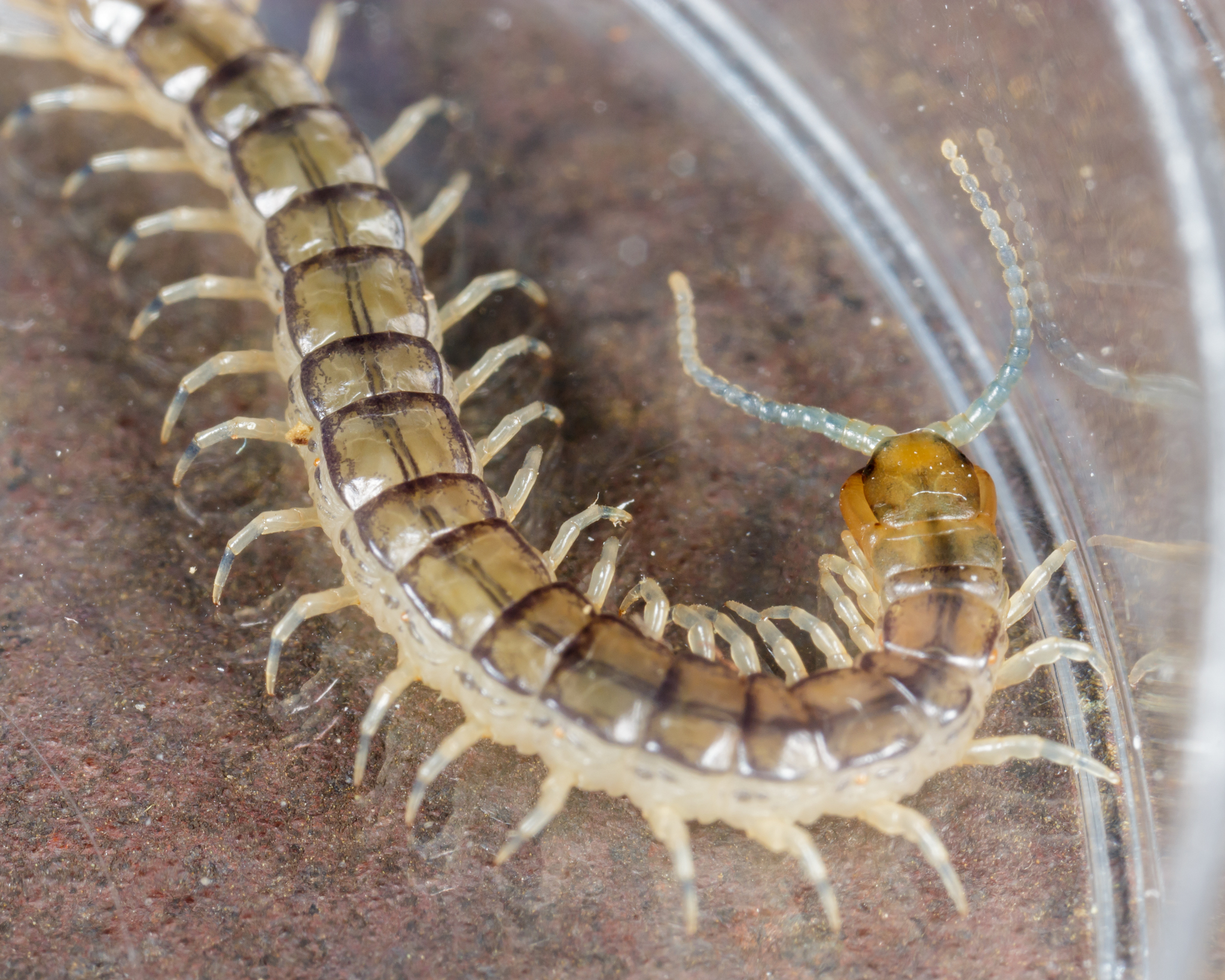
- Hemiscolopendra marginata, Texas

Scientific classification
- Kingdom: Animalia
- Phylum: Arthropoda
- Subphylum: Myriapoda
- Class: Chilopoda
- Order: Scolopendromorpha
- Family: Scolopendridae
- Genus: Hemiscolopendra; Kraepelin, 1903

= Hemiscolopendra =

Genus of centipedes

Hemiscolopendra is a monytopic genus of bark centipedes in the family Scolopendridae. There is a singular described species in Hemiscolopendra, found in the eastern United States.

== Species ==
These is one species that belongs to the genus Hemiscolopendra:

- Hemiscolopendra marginata (Say, 1821) (eastern bark centipede)
