= Cormocephalus amphieurys =

Scientific classification
- Kingdom: Animalia
- Phylum: Arthropoda
- Subphylum: Myriapoda
- Class: Chilopoda
- Order: Scolopendromorpha
- Family: Scolopendridae
- Genus: Cormocephalus
- Species: C. amphieurys

Binomial name
- Cormocephalus amphieurys (Kohlrausch, 1878)

Synonyms
- Cupipes amphieurys Kohlrausch, 1878; Cupipes quadrisulcatus Meinert, 1886

Species of centipede

Cormocephalus amphieurys is a species of centipede in the Scolopendridae family. It was described in 1878 by E. Köhlrausch.

== Distribution ==
The species occurs in Micronesia. The type locality is Pohnpei.
