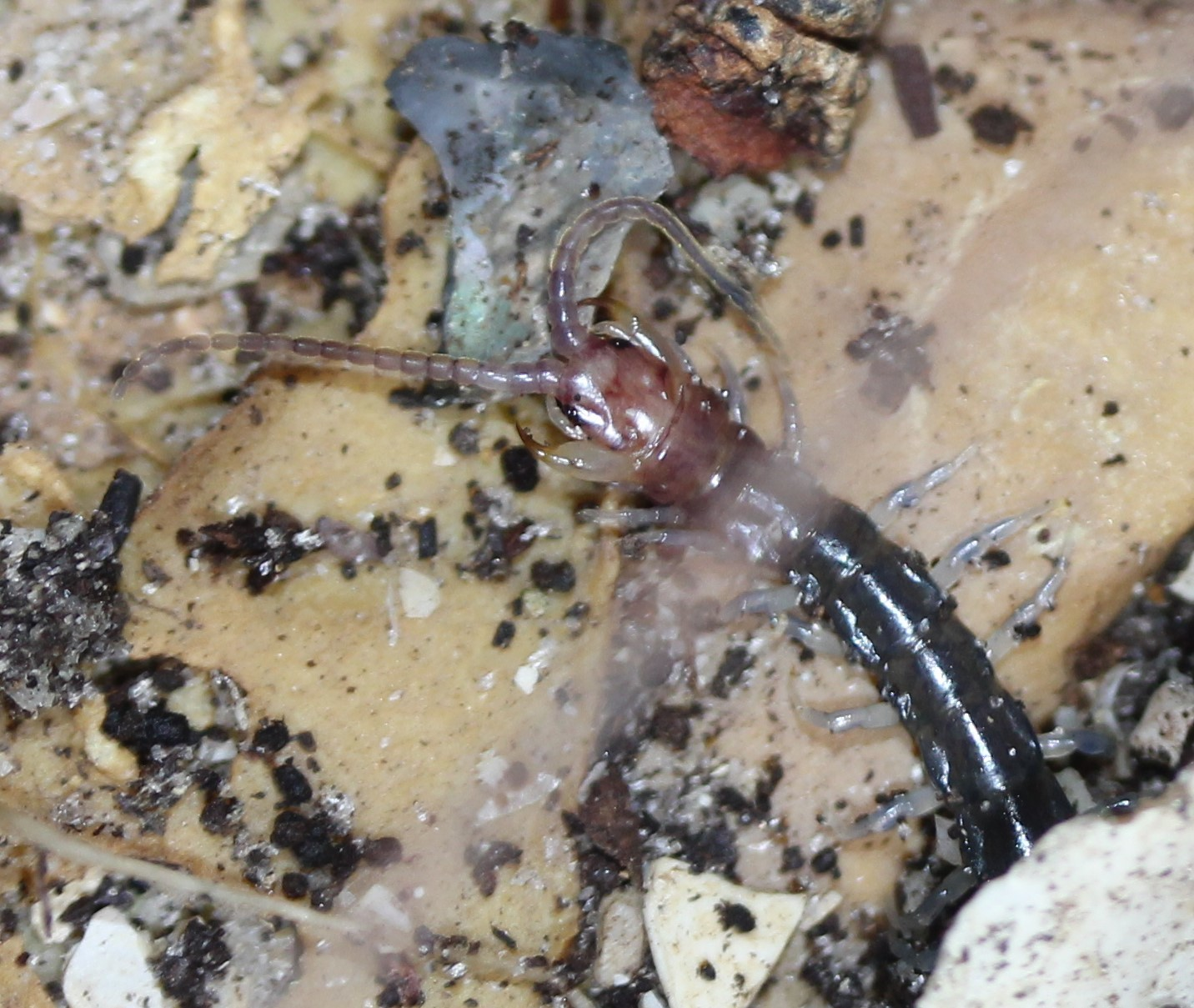

Scientific classification
- Kingdom: Animalia
- Phylum: Arthropoda
- Subphylum: Myriapoda
- Class: Chilopoda
- Order: Scolopendromorpha
- Family: Scolopendridae
- Genus: Rhysida
- Species: R. longipes

Binomial name
- Rhysida longipes (Newport, 1845)

Synonyms
- Branchiostoma affine Kohlrausch, 1878; Branchiostoma gracile Kohlrausch, 1878; Otostigmus simplex Chamberlin, 1913; Rhysida yanagiharai Takakuwa, 1935; Rhysida longipes brevicornis Takakuwa, 1934; Branchiostoma longipes rotundatum Haase, 1887

= Rhysida longipes =

Species of centipede

Rhysida longipes, sometimes known as minor blue leg, is a species of centipedes in the family Scolopendridae. Four subspecies are recognized. It is sometimes used as a pet in some countries.

== Subspecies ==
- Rhysida longipes afghanistana
- Rhysida longipes longipes
- Rhysida longipes malayica
- Rhysida longipes simplicior
