= Cormocephalus inermipes =

Scientific classification
- Kingdom: Animalia
- Phylum: Arthropoda
- Subphylum: Myriapoda
- Class: Chilopoda
- Order: Scolopendromorpha
- Family: Scolopendridae
- Genus: Cormocephalus
- Species: C. inermipes

Binomial name
- Cormocephalus inermipes Pocock, 1891

Species of centipede

Cormocephalus inermipes is a species of centipedes in the family Scolopendridae. It is endemic to Sri Lanka.
