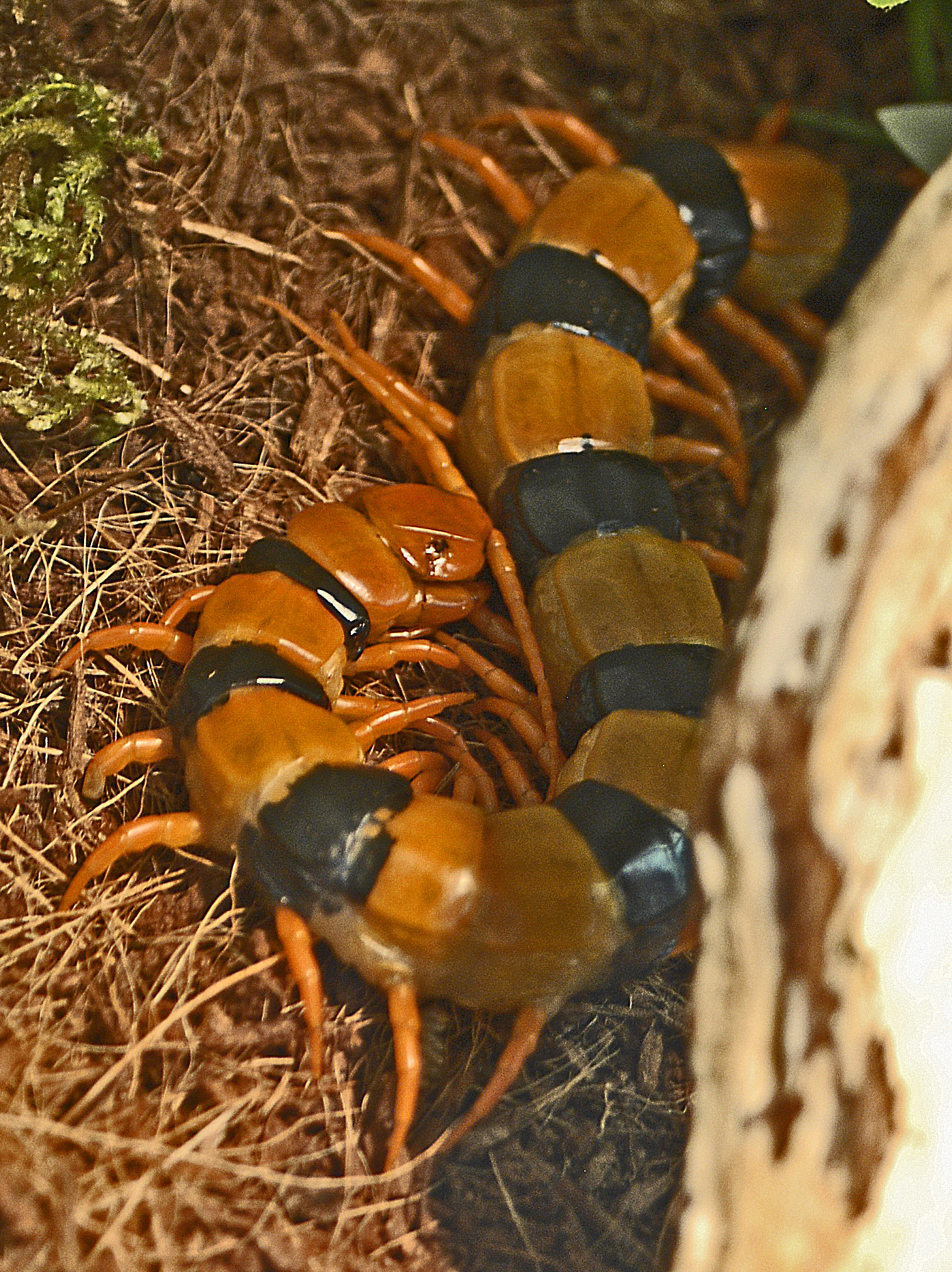

Scientific classification
- Domain: Eukaryota
- Kingdom: Animalia
- Phylum: Arthropoda
- Subphylum: Myriapoda
- Class: Chilopoda
- Order: Scolopendromorpha
- Family: Scolopendridae
- Genus: Scolopendra
- Species: S. hardwickei

Binomial name
- Scolopendra hardwickei Newport, 1844

Synonyms
- Scolopendra bicolor (Humbert, 1865); Scolopendra histrionic (CL Koch, 1847)

= Scolopendra hardwickei =

Species of centipede

Scolopendra hardwickei, the Indian tiger centipede, is a species of centipede in the family Scolopendridae.

== Description ==
Scolopendra hardwickei can reach a length of 16 centimetres (6.3 in). Antennas consist of 17 or 18 segments, of which the first 6-7 are shiny. It is a pigmented species, with exceptionally bright and contrasting coloration, alternating dark orange and deep black segments, with dark orange legs. The head and antennae or also dark orange, but the first six segments of the antennae are generally of a lighter hue.

== Distribution ==
This species is common in the south of the Indian peninsula and it is rarely found on the islands of Sumatra and Nicobar.

== Venom ==
The bite of S. hardwickei can cause swelling and drowsiness.

== Bibliography ==
- Attems C. (1930) Myriopoda. 2. Scolopendromorpha, Das Tierreich. De Gruyter, Berlin. 54: 1-308
- ChiloBase: A World Catalogue of Centipedes (Chilopoda) for the web. Minelli A. (ed)
- Dr. Graf Attems - Myriopoda. 2. Scolopendromorpha (1930)
- G.E. Lewis. 1981. The biology of centipedes, Cambridge University Press
- Haase E. (1887) Die Indisch-Australischen Myriopoden. Pt. I. Chilopoden, Abhandlungen und Berichte des Königlichen Zoologischen und. Anthropologisch- Ethnographischen Museums zu Dresden. 5: 1-118
- Humbert A. (1865) Essai sur les myriapodes de Ceylan, Mèmoires de la Société de Physique et d'Histoire Naturelle de Genéve. 18: 1-62
- Koch C.L. (1847) System der Myriapoden. In: Herrich-Schäffer L. (ed.), Kritische Revision der Insectenfauna Deutschlands., Pustet, Regensburg. 3:1-270
- Newport G. (1844) A list of the species of Myriapoda order Chilopoda contained in the cabinets of the British Museum with synoptic descriptions of forty-seven new species, Annals and Magazine of Natural History. 13: 94-101
