= Campylostigmus plessisi =

Scientific classification
- Kingdom: Animalia
- Phylum: Arthropoda
- Subphylum: Myriapoda
- Class: Chilopoda
- Order: Scolopendromorpha
- Family: Scolopendridae
- Genus: Campylostigmus
- Species: C. plessisi

Binomial name
- Campylostigmus plessisi Demange, 1963

Species of centipede

Campylostigmus plessisi is a species of centipede in the Geophilidae family. It is endemic to New Caledonia, a French overseas territory in Melanesia. It was first described in 1963 by French myriapodologist J. M. Demange.

== Distribution and habitat ==
The type locality is the reef flat of Île Mathieu, 60 km north-west of Nouméa, on Grande Terre. Specimen material was found in a pile of Acropora coral at mid-tide level.
