= Cormocephalus turneri =

Scientific classification
- Kingdom: Animalia
- Phylum: Arthropoda
- Subphylum: Myriapoda
- Class: Chilopoda
- Order: Scolopendromorpha
- Family: Scolopendridae
- Genus: Cormocephalus
- Species: C. turneri

Binomial name
- Cormocephalus turneri Pocock, 1901

Species of centipede

Cormocephalus turneri is a species of centipede in the Scolopendridae family. It is endemic to Australia, and was first described in 1901 by British zoologist Reginald Innes Pocock.

== Distribution ==
The species is found in Western Australia, South Australia and Victoria.

== Behaviour ==
The centipedes are solitary terrestrial predators that inhabit plant litter, soil and rotting wood.
