= Campylostigmus =

Scientific classification
- Kingdom: Animalia
- Phylum: Arthropoda
- Subphylum: Myriapoda
- Class: Chilopoda
- Order: Scolopendromorpha
- Family: Scolopendridae
- Genus: Campylostigmus; Ribaut, 1923

Type species
- Campylostigmus crassipes Ribaut, 1923

Genus of centipedes

Campylostigmus is a genus of centipedes in the family Scolopendridae. It was described by French entomologist Henri Ribaut in 1923.

== Species ==
There are six valid species:

- Campylostigmus biseriatus Ribaut, 1923
- Campylostigmus consobrinus Ribaut, 1923
- Campylostigmus crassipes Ribaut, 1923
- Campylostigmus decipiens Ribaut, 1923
- Campylostigmus orientalis Ribaut, 1923
- Campylostigmus plessisi Demange, 1963
