= Kraepelin =

Kraepelin is a surname. Notable people with the surname include:

- Emil Kraepelin (1856–1926), German psychiatrist
- Karl Kraepelin (1848–1915), German naturalist
