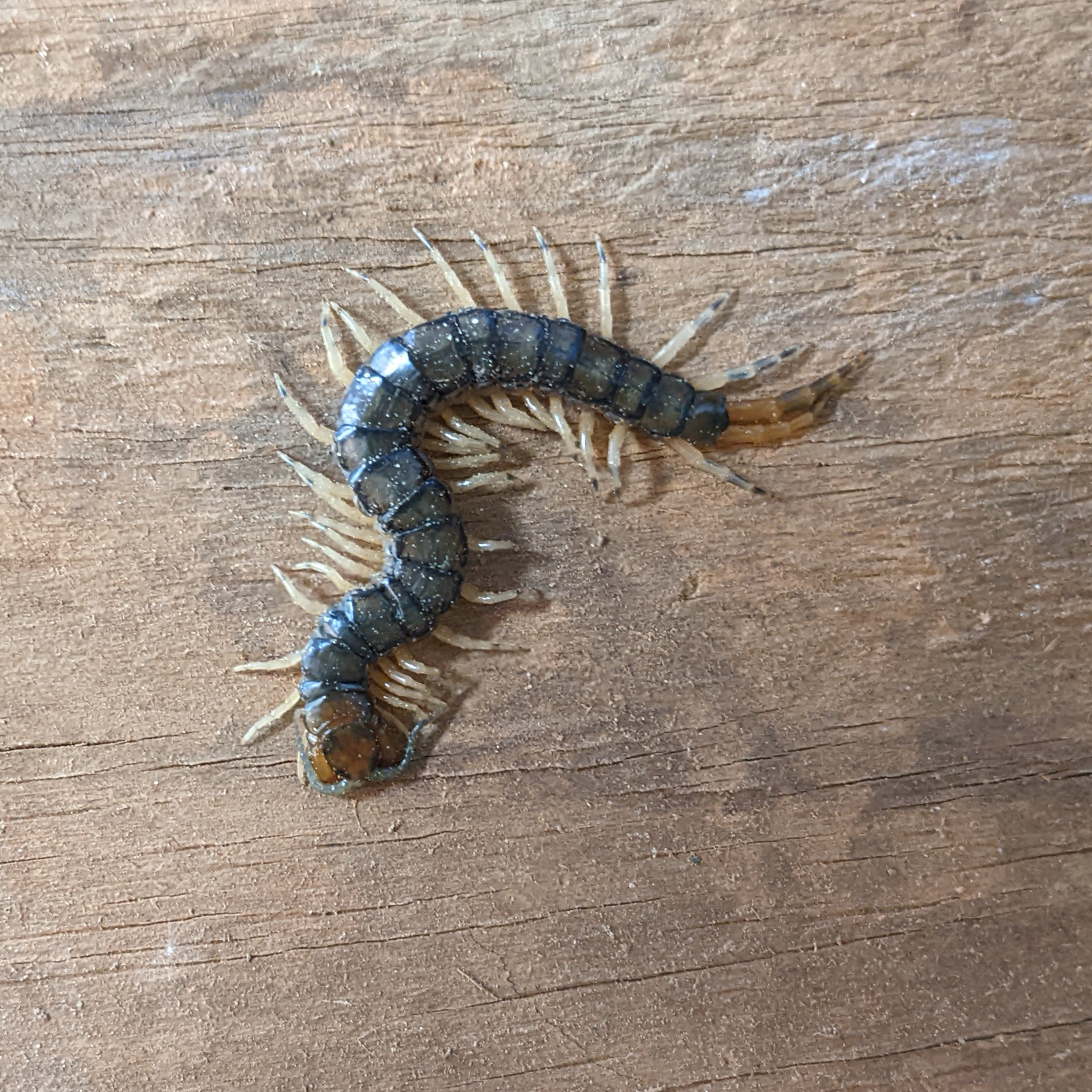

Scientific classification
- Kingdom: Animalia
- Phylum: Arthropoda
- Subphylum: Myriapoda
- Class: Chilopoda
- Order: Scolopendromorpha
- Family: Scolopendridae
- Genus: Hemiscolopendra
- Species: H. marginata

Binomial name
- Hemiscolopendra marginata (Say, 1821)
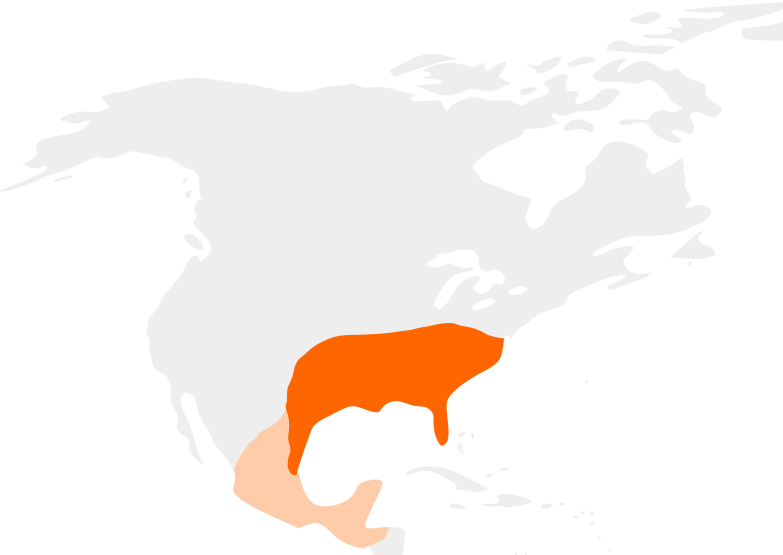

Synonyms
- Scolopendra parva Wood, 1861; Scolopendra punctiventris Newport, 1844; Scolopendra woodi Meinert, 1886

= Hemiscolopendra marginata =

Species of centipede

Hemiscolopendra marginata, the eastern bark centipede, is a common species of centipede found in the Eastern United States and parts of Mexico. H. marginata is the first centipede species shown to exhibit sexual dimorphism in venom composition.

== Appearance ==
Hemiscolopendra marginata is a species of medium-sized Scolopendrid centipede, with adults growing around 4 cm in length.
