= Notiasemus =

Scientific classification
- Kingdom: Animalia
- Phylum: Arthropoda
- Subphylum: Myriapoda
- Class: Chilopoda
- Order: Scolopendromorpha
- Family: Scolopendridae
- Genus: Notiasemus; L.E.Koch, 1985
- Species: N. glauerti

Binomial name
- Notiasemus glauerti L.E.Koch, 1985

Genus of centipedes

Notiasemus is a monotypic genus of centipedes in the Scolopendridae family. Its sole species is Notiasemus glauerti. It is endemic to Australia, and was first described in 1985 by L. E. Koch.

== Distribution ==
The species occurs in south-west Western Australia.

== Behaviour ==
The centipedes are solitary terrestrial predators that inhabit plant litter, soil and rotting wood.
