= Cormocephalus westwoodi =

Scientific classification
- Kingdom: Animalia
- Phylum: Arthropoda
- Subphylum: Myriapoda
- Class: Chilopoda
- Order: Scolopendromorpha
- Family: Scolopendridae
- Genus: Cormocephalus
- Species: C. westwoodi

Binomial name
- Cormocephalus westwoodi Newport, (1844)

Synonyms
- Cormocephalus dispar Porat 1871; Cormocephalus elegans Kraepelin 1903; Cormocephalus fangaroka Saussure & Zehntner 1902; Cormocephalus foecundus Newport 1845; Cormocephalus lanatipes Kohlrausch 1878; Cormocephalus longicornis Porat 1871; Cormocephalus monilicornis Porat 1876; Cormocephalus pallipes Newport 1845; Cormocephalus purpureus Pocock 1893; Cormocephalus rugulosus Porat 1871; Cormocephalus sarasinorum Haase 1887; Cormocephalus violaceus Newport 1845; Cormocephalus westwoodi microdens Lawrence, 1955; Scolopendra puncticeps Gervais 1847; Scolopendra violacescens Gervais 1847; [? *Cormocephalus huttoni Pocock 1893

Species of arthropods

Cormocephalus westwoodi is a species of centipedes in the family Scolopendridae. The species was previously considered by many names in many regions of the world, where some synonyms are still exists valid in certain countries. Five subspecies are currently recognized.

== Subspecies ==
- Cormocephalus westwoodi anceps Porat, 1871 - Southern & Central Africa (South Africa, etc)
- Cormocephalus westwoodi lambertoni Brolemann, 1922 - Madagascar
- Cormocephalus westwoodi ribauti Attems, 1928 - Australia (New South Wales).
- Cormocephalus westwoodi westwoodi (Newport, 1844) - Australia (but also potentially in adjacent to Indian Ocean zone, also South Africa and Madagascar)

Possibly also:

- Cormocephalus westwoodi nubigenus Lawrence, 1955 - South Africa
- Cormocephalus westwoodi huttoni Pocock, 1893 - New Zealand

== Ecology and description ==
Like other bark centipedes, C. westwoodi also prefer to live under rocks, barks and litter. It is the largest centipede found in Tasmania, reaching 60 mm in length. It is also used as a pet in Oceanian countries. The species often confused with Cormocephalus aurantiipes.
