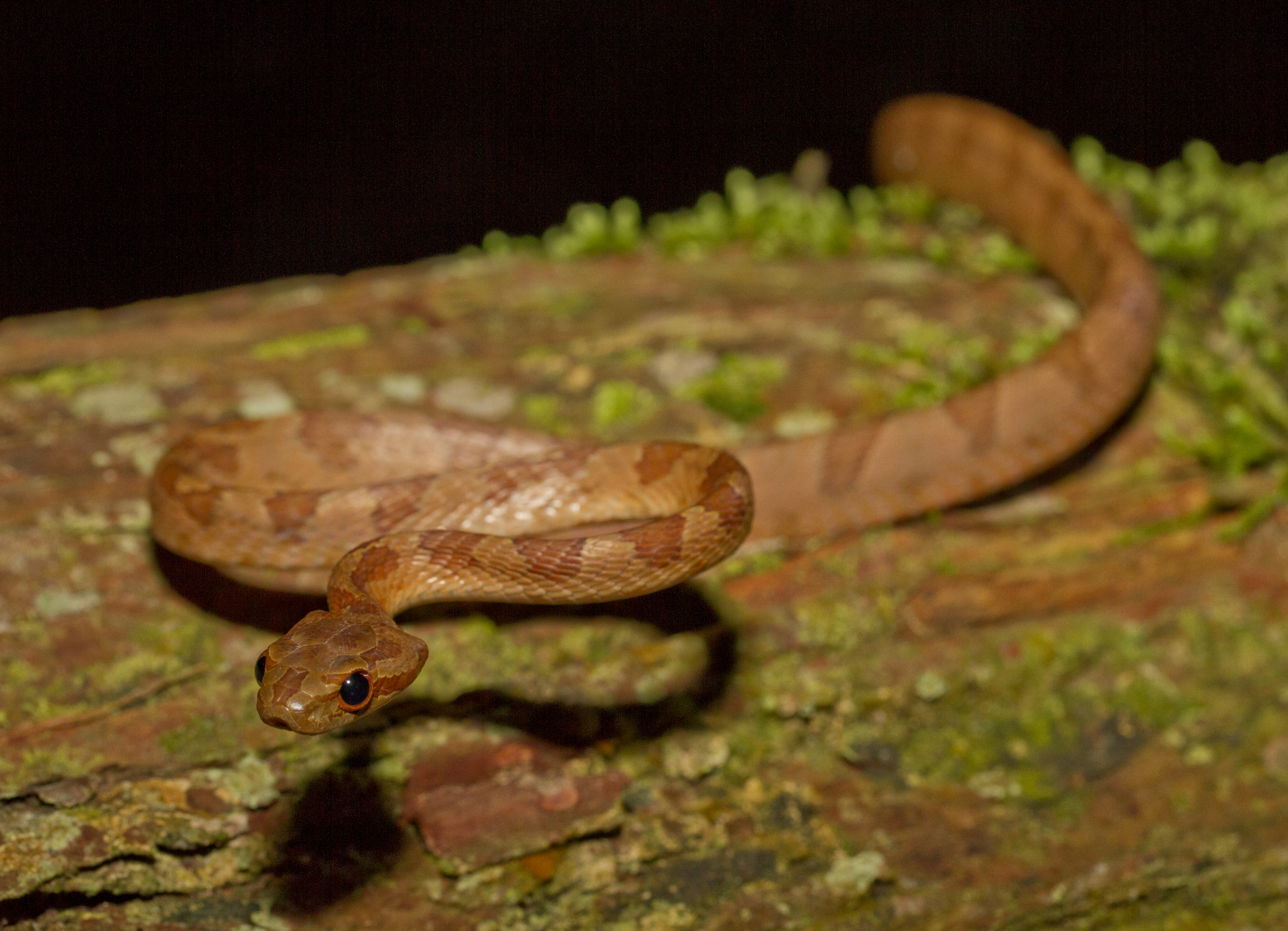

Conservation status
- Least Concern (IUCN 3.1)

Scientific classification
- Kingdom: Animalia
- Phylum: Chordata
- Class: Reptilia
- Order: Squamata
- Suborder: Serpentes
- Family: Colubridae
- Genus: Boiga
- Species: B. kraepelini

Binomial name
- Boiga kraepelini Stejneger, 1902
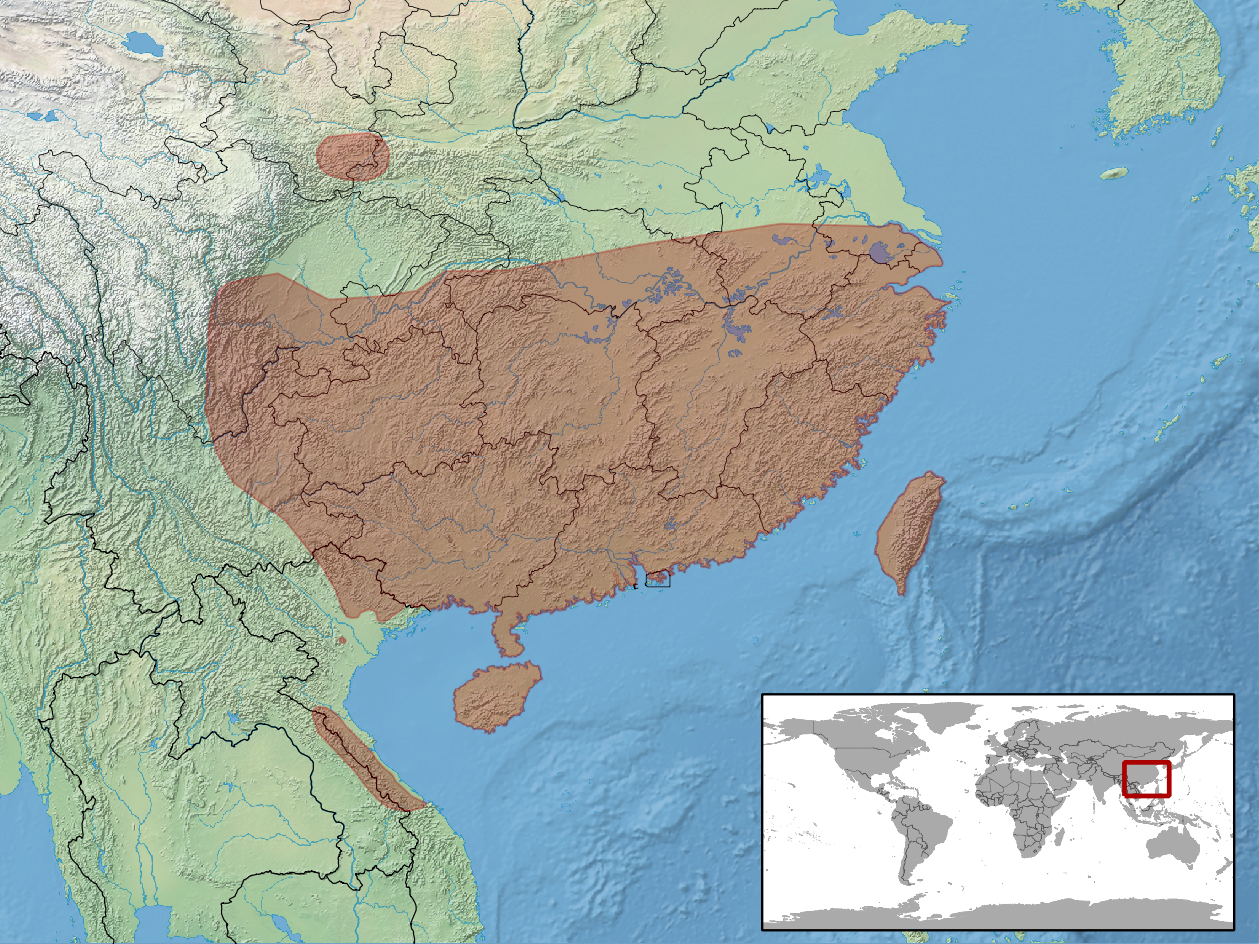

Synonyms
- Boiga kraepelini Stejneger, 1902; Dipsadomorphus kraepelini — Wall, 1903; Dinodon multitemporalis Ōshima, 1910; Boiga sinensis Schmidt, 1925; Boiga multitemporalis — M.A. Smith, 1943; Boiga kraepelini — Ziegler, 2002

= Boiga kraepelini =

Species of snake

Boiga kraepelini, commonly known as the square-headed cat snake, Kelung cat snake, or Taiwanese tree snake, is a mildly venomous species of rear-fanged snake in the family Colubridae. The species is native to East Asia and Southeast Asia (Taiwan, China, Vietnam, and Laos). Its specific name, kraepelini, honours Karl Kraepelin, a German naturalist. The common name, Kelung cat snake, refers to its type locality, Keelung in northern Taiwan.

== Description ==
B. kraepelini is a long and thin snake that can grow to a total length (including tail) of 160 cm (63 in). Its head and eyes are large with the head measuring twice the width of the neck. The pupils are cat-like, as is typical for its genus. The colouration of the upper surface of the body and tail is usually amber or brown to copper brown, with irregular brown to diffuse black cross bands along the vertebral line.

== Reproduction ==
B. kraepelini is oviparous. Females lay 5–14 eggs per clutch in summer.

== Behaviour and venom ==
B. kraepelini can be quite aggressive, forming a defensive coil and striking in a viper-like fashion when threatened. The properties of the venom are poorly known, but it is considered only mildly venomous.

== Distribution and habitat ==
B. kraepelini is found throughout Taiwan to 1,000 m (3,300 ft) asl, large parts of eastern, central, and southern China (Anhui, Chongqing, Fujian, Gansu, Guangdong, Guangxi, Guizhou, Hainan, Hunan, Jiangxi, Sichuan, and Zhejiang provinces), Laos, and northern Vietnam.

It is found in both primary and secondary forest habitats, often near villages.

== Behaviour and ecology ==
B. kraepelini is a nocturnal snake that is largely arboreal, although it may descend to the ground to cross roads. It preys upon small birds and lizards, and sometimes bird eggs.

== Conservation status ==
B. kraepelini is a widespread and common species. It can be locally threatened by habitat loss. It occurs in many protected areas.
