= Wolfgang Bücherl =

German-Brazilian arachnologist

- Born: April 27, 1911; Furth im Wald, Germany
- Died: January 14, 1985 (aged 73); São Paulo, Brazil
- Known for: Research on venomous arachnids and animal venoms
- Scientific career
- Fields: Biology, Arachnology, Zoology

Wolfgang Bücherl (April 27, 1911 – January 14, 1985) was a German-Brazilian biologist, university professor, and noted arachnologist. He became internationally known for his long-standing work at the Butantan Institute in São Paulo, particularly for his research on venomous arachnids and animal toxins.

== Early life and education ==
Bücherl was born in Furth im Wald, Germany, in 1911. At the age of 18, he emigrated to Brazil, where he studied from 1930 to 1932 at the Faculty of Philosophy of the Pontifical Catholic University of São Paulo. Although initially enrolled in philosophy-related studies, he soon developed a stronger interest in biology. He later pursued studies in biology and natural sciences at the Westphalian Wilhelms University of Münster in Germany. His doctoral dissertation was titled On the question of the phylogenetic origin of the thoracic musculature of Lithobius fortificatus. A contribution to the study of arthropods, reflecting his early specialization in arthropod morphology and evolution.

== Academic and research career ==
After completing his doctorate, Bücherl returned to Brazil in 1938. He was appointed full professor of biology at the Pontifical Catholic University of São Paulo, a position he held during 1939 and 1940. At the same time, he began working at the Butantan Institute in São Paulo. Bücherl’s career at the Butantan Institute spanned more than 35 years. He eventually became a division director, and his research during this period earned him international recognition. His scientific output included numerous studies on venomous arachnids and scorpions, published as books, monographs, and comprehensive reference works on venomous animals and animal toxins.

Among his best-known publications is the book Das Haus der Gifte – Die Geschichte vom Butantan Institut São Paulo (“The House of Poisons – The History of the Butantan Institute, São Paulo”), published in 1963 by the Franckh’sche Verlagshandlung (Kosmos Society of Friends of Nature) in Stuttgart. Following his retirement, Bücherl served for several years as managing director of the Hans Staden Institute.

== Scientific contributions ==
Bücherl made significant contributions to arachnology, toxinology, and zoology. His work at the Butantan Institute encompassed research on spider and scorpion venoms, snakebite envenomation, and other toxin-related studies, many of which appeared in the journal Memórias do Instituto Butantan. He was honored posthumously in volumes 47/48 (1983–1984) of Memórias do Instituto Butantan, which included a dedicated tribute acknowledging his scientific legacy and extensive contributions to the institute’s research output.

== Personal life ==
Bücherl was married and had one daughter.

== Awards and honors ==
- Gold Medal of the Prêmio Mello-Leitão of the Brazilian Academy of Sciences
- Vital Brazil Medal of the Butantan Institute, awarded on the occasion of the 100th anniversary of Vital Brazil
- Grand Cross of the Order of Merit of the Federal Republic of Germany for his scientific achievements
