= George Newport =

English entomologist (1803–1854)

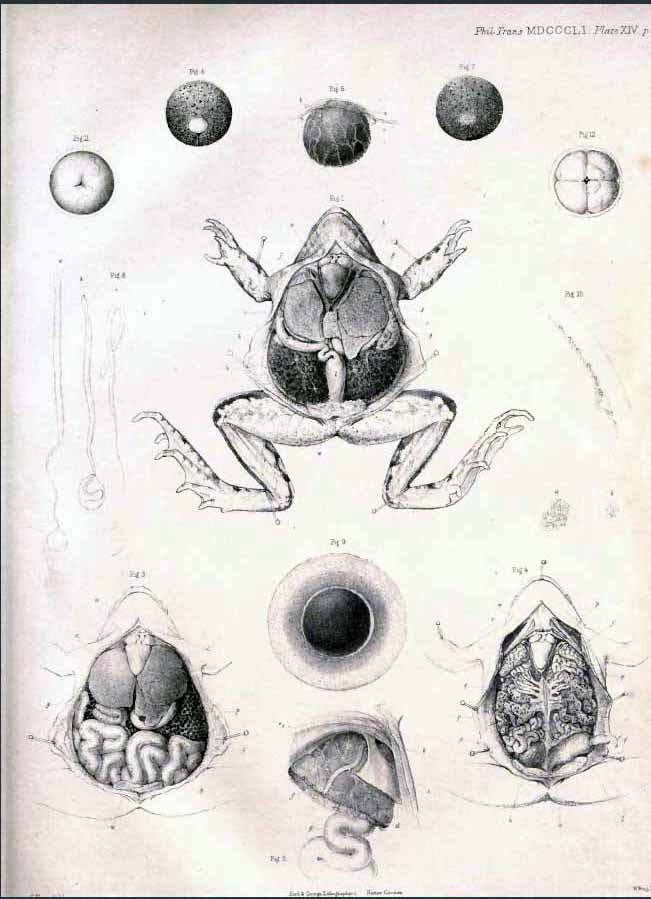
Plate from "On the Impregnation of the Ovum in the Amphibia"

George Newport FRS (4 February 1803, Canterbury – 7 April 1854, London) was an English entomologist. He is especially noted for his studies utilizing the microscope and his skills in dissection.

== Biography ==
He was the first of four children of William Newport (1777-1843), a local wheelwright, and Sarah Gillham. He was educated at London University and at the College of Surgeons. He was President of the Entomological Society of London (1843–1844) and also a member of the Ray Society. Newport was awarded with the Royal Medal 1836 and with the Royal Society Bakerian Medal 1841. He is buried in Kensal Green Cemetery, London.

== Works ==
He was one of the most skilled anatomists of his time, and his researches on the structure of insects and other arthropods are notable. His publications include:

- On the Respiration of Insects (1836)
- “Insecta,” in Todd's Cyclopædia of Anatomy and Physiology (1839)
- On the Use of Antennæ of Insects (1840)
- List of Specimens of Myriopoda in the British Museum (1844)
- Monograph of the Class Myriopoda, Order Chilopoda (1845)
- On the Impregnation of the Ovum in the Amphibia (1851)

Newport wrote on the structure, relations, and development of the nervous and circulatory systems, and on the existence of a complete circulation of the blood in vessels, in Myriapoda and macrourous Arachnida in the Philosophical Transactions of the Royal Society of London First series. 1843: 243-302; see p. 270. He published researches on the impregnation of the ovum in the Amphibia; and on the early stages of development of the embryo. Phil. Trans. R. Soc 144, 229-244. (1854) Newport wrote on the Organs of Reproduction, and the Development of the Myriopoda in Phil. Trans. R. Soc. And he wrote on the Nervous System of the Sphinx ligustri, Linn., (Part II) During the Latter Stages of its Pupa and its Imago State, and on the Means by Which its Development is Affected Phil. Trans. R. Soc.
