= Henri Ribaut =

Henri Ribaut (1872 – 14 February 1967, in Toulouse) was a French naturalist and entomologist. He was a specialist in Hemiptera notably Auchenorrhyncha Sternorrhyncha, Heteroptera, and Coleorrhyncha. His collection which includes Hymenoptera is held by the University of Toulouse, Laboratoire d'Entomologie.

== Works ==
partial list

- Faune de France Volume n° 31 - Henri Ribaut (1872-1967) - Homoptères Auchénorhynques. I. Typhlocybidae. 1936, 231 p. (réimpression 1986)
- Faune de France Volume n° 57 - Henri Ribaut (1872-1967) - Homoptères Auchénorhynque II. Jassidae. 1952, 474 p. (réimpression 2000)
