= Karl Kraepelin =

German naturalist

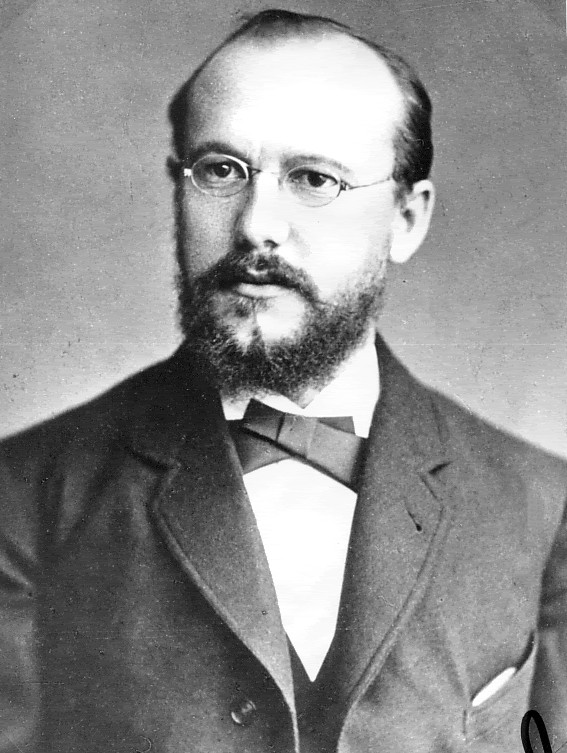
- Born: 14 December 1848; Neustrelitz, Grand Duchy of Mecklenburg-Strelitz
- Died: 28 June 1915 (aged 66); Hamburg, German Empire
- Scientific career
- Fields: Arachnology, Myriapodology
- Author abbrev. (zoology): Kraepelin

Karl Matthias Friedrich Magnus Kraepelin (/ˈkrɛpəlɪn/; German: [ˈkʁɛːpəliːn]; 14 December 1848 – 28 June 1915) was a German naturalist who specialised in the study of scorpions, centipedes, spiders and solfugids, and was noted for his monograph Scorpiones und Pedipalpi (Berlin) in 1899, which was an exhaustive survey of the taxonomy of the Order Scorpiones. From 1889 to 1914, he served as the director of the Naturhistorisches Museum Hamburg, which was destroyed during World War II, and worked on myriapods from 1901 to 1916.

== Biography ==
Karl Kraepelin was born in Neustrelitz. He studied natural sciences in Göttingen and Leipzig, where he earned his PhD in 1873, and taught as a teacher of mathematics and sciences in schools in Leipzig and Hamburg from 1873 to 1889. In 1884 he became a member of the German Academy of Sciences Leopoldina. He was a member of the Assembly of University Professors of Hamburg from 1901 and the Faculty Council of Colonial Institute from 1908.

He was one of 7 children of scholar, stage actor and singer Karl Kraepelin (1817–1882), who had also founded a theological college. His younger brother, Emil Kraepelin (1856–1926), was a pioneer in experimental psychiatry and professor of psychiatry in Munich from 1903 to 1922. Between 1903 and 1904 Karl, accompanied by Emil, set out on a five-month voyage, visiting Ceylon, India, Singapore and Java, and in 1908 they undertook a two-month trip to the United States.

Kraepelin gained worldwide recognition for his commitment to reform science education in schools. He authored several books on botany and zoology, among which, Leitfaden für den Unterricht an Botanischen mittleren und höheren Schulen ("Guide for botany classes in middle and high schools").

He died in Hamburg, aged 66.

Numerous species were named in his honour, e.g. Boiga kraepelini, the square-headed cat snake, Physocypria kraepelini (an ostracod), Clavatula kraepelini (a sea-snail), Tetramorium kraepelini (an ant), Iurus kraepelini (a scorpion) and many others.

== Selected publications ==
- Kraepelin K (1887). "Die Deutschen Süsswasser-Bryozoen. I. Anatomisch-systematischer Teil ". Abhandlungen des Naturwissenschaftlichen Vereins in Hamburg 10: 1-168 + Plates 1–7. Online. (in German)
- Kraepelin K (1900). "Über einige neue Gliederspinnen ". Abhandlungen und Verhandlungen des Naturwissenschaftlichen Vereins in Hamburg 16 (1): 4. (in German).
- Kraepelin K (1901). "Palpigradi und Solifugae. Heft 12 ". pp. xi + 1–159. In: Das Tierreich. Eine Zusammenstellung und Kennzeichnung der rezenten Tierformen. (in German).
- Kraepelin K (1903). "Scorpione und Solifugen Nordost-Afrikas, gesammelt 1900 und 1901 von Carlo Freihern von Erlanger und Oscar Neumann". Zoologische Jahrbücher. Abteilung für Systematik, Geographie und Biologie der Tiere 18: 557–578. (in German).
- Kraepelin K (1908). "Die sekundären Geschlechtscharaktere der Skorpione, Pedipalpen und Solifugen ". Jahrbuch der Hamburgischen Wissenschaftlichen Anstalten 25: 181–225. (in German).
