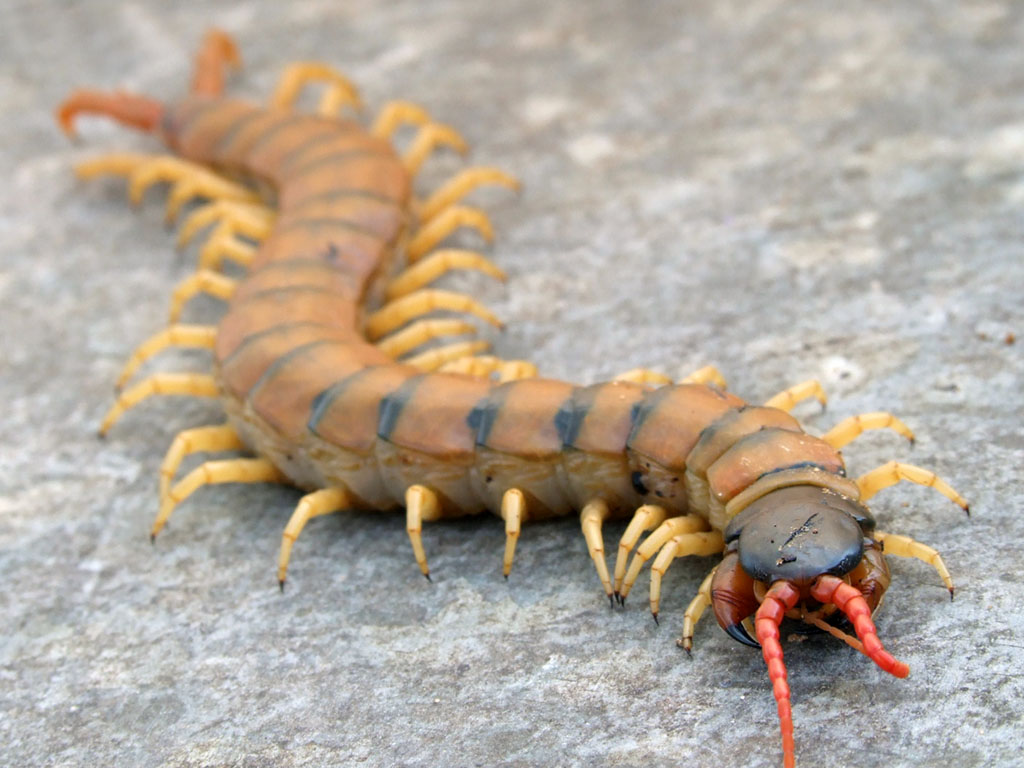
- Scolopendra cingulata

Scientific classification
- Kingdom: Animalia
- Phylum: Arthropoda
- Subphylum: Myriapoda
- Class: Chilopoda
- Order: Scolopendromorpha
- Family: Scolopendridae; Newport, 1844

Genera
- See text.

= Scolopendridae =

Scolopendridae Temporal range: 122.46–0 Ma Early Cretaceous to present

Family of centipedes

Scolopendridae (or, in older documents, Scolopendridæ), from Ancient Greek σκόλοψ (skólops), meaning "thorn", and ἔντερον (énteron), meaning "earthworm", is a family of large centipedes (class Chilopoda).

== Description ==
Nearly all species in this family have four ocelli (simple eyes) on each side of the head and only 21 pairs of legs, but there are exceptions: two scolopendrid species feature more legs (Scolopendropsis bahiensis, with 21 or 23 leg pairs, and S. duplicata, with 39 or 43 leg pairs), and some scolopendrid species are eyeless and blind (e.g., Cormocephalus sagmus, C. pyropygus, and C. delta). Three Asian members of this family, Scolopendra cataracta, Scolopendra paradoxa, and Scolopendra alcyona, are known to show amphibious behaviour. Two other species, Scolopendra hardwickei and Hemiscolopendra marginata, are known to show sexual dimorphism in the composition of their venom.

== Genera ==
=== Subfamily Otostigminae (Kraepelin, 1903) ===
==== Tribe Otostigmini (Kraeplin, 1903) ====
- Alipes Imhoff, 1854
- Alluropus Silvestri, 1911
- Digitipes Attems, 1930
- Edentistoma Tömösváry,1882
- Ethmostigmus Pocock, 1898
- Otostigmus Porat, 1876
- Rhysida Wood, 1862

==== Tribe Sterropristini (Verhoeff, 1937) ====
- Sterropristes Attems, 1934

=== Subfamily Scolopendrinae (Leach, 1814) ===
Sources:

- Arthrorhabdus Pocock, 1891 (= Arthrorhabdinus)
- Asanada Meinert, 1885 (= Pseudocryptops)
- Asanadopsis Würmli, 1972
- Campylostigmus Ribaut, 1923
- Notiasemus Koch, 1985
- Procrytops Piton, 1940
- Psiloscolopendra Kraepelin, 1903
- Rhoda Meinert, 1886 (= Pithopus)
- Scolopendra Linnaeus, 1758
- Scolopendropsis Brandt, 1841
- Tonkinodentus Schileyko, 1992

The earliest record of this family is †Cratoraricrus, an extinct genus from the Early Cretaceous of the Crato Formation of Brazil.
