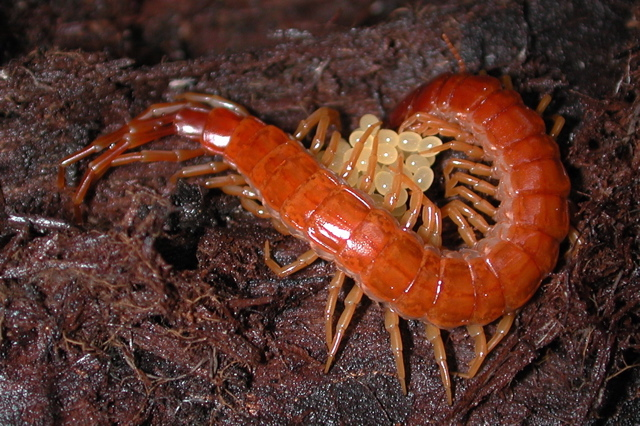
- Scolopendra ovitora guarding her eggs

Scientific classification
- Kingdom: Animalia
- Phylum: Arthropoda
- Subphylum: Myriapoda
- Class: Chilopoda
- Clade: Epimorpha
- Order: Scolopendromorpha; Pocock, 1895

Type species
- Scolopendra morsitans Linnaeus, 1758

Families
- Cryptopidae; Mimopidae; Plutoniumidae; Scolopendridae; Scolopocryptopidae

= Scolopendromorpha =

Order of centipedes

Scolopendromorpha (from Ancient Greek σκόλοψ (skólops), meaning "thorn", ἔντερον (énteron), meaning "earthworm", and μορφή (morphḗ), meaning "form") is an order of centipedes also known as tropical centipedes or bark centipedes. This order includes about 700 species in five families. These centipedes are found nearly worldwide, with tropical and subtropical regions providing the richest diversity in species. This order includes the only known amphibious centipedes, Scolopendra cataracta, Scolopendra paradoxa, and Scolopendra alcyona.

== Description ==
The centipedes in this order are epimorphic, hatching with a full complement of segments. They usually possess 21 or 23 trunk segments with the same number of paired legs. The number of leg pairs is fixed at 21 for most species in this order and fixed at 23 for the remaining species, except for two species with intraspecific variation: Scolopendropsis bahiensis, which has 21 or 23 leg pairs, and S. duplicata, which has 39 or 43 leg pairs. Species in this order have flattened bodies ranging from 9 mm to 30 cm in length. Colors vary but can be vivid sometimes. Antennae usually have from 14 to 34 segments (but usually have 17 to 21 segments).

== Families ==
The order comprises the five families Cryptopidae, Scolopendridae, Mimopidae, Scolopocryptopidae, and Plutoniumidae. Nearly all species in the family Scolopendridae have four ocelli (simple eyes) on each side of the head, and the genus Mimops (family Mimopidae) features a pale area often considered an ocellus on each side of the head, whereas the other three families are blind. Species in the family Scolopocryptopidae have 23 leg-bearing segments, whereas species in all other families in this order have only 21 leg-bearing segments (with the exception of the genus Scolopendropsis in Scolopendridae).
