= S. calcarata =

S. calcarata could refer to one of the following species:

- Scaphiophryne calcarata, a frog of the family Microhylidae
- Scolopendra calcarata, a centipede of the family Scolopendridae
- Scopula calcarata, a moth of the family Geometridae
- Stenodema calcarata, an insect of the family Miridae
