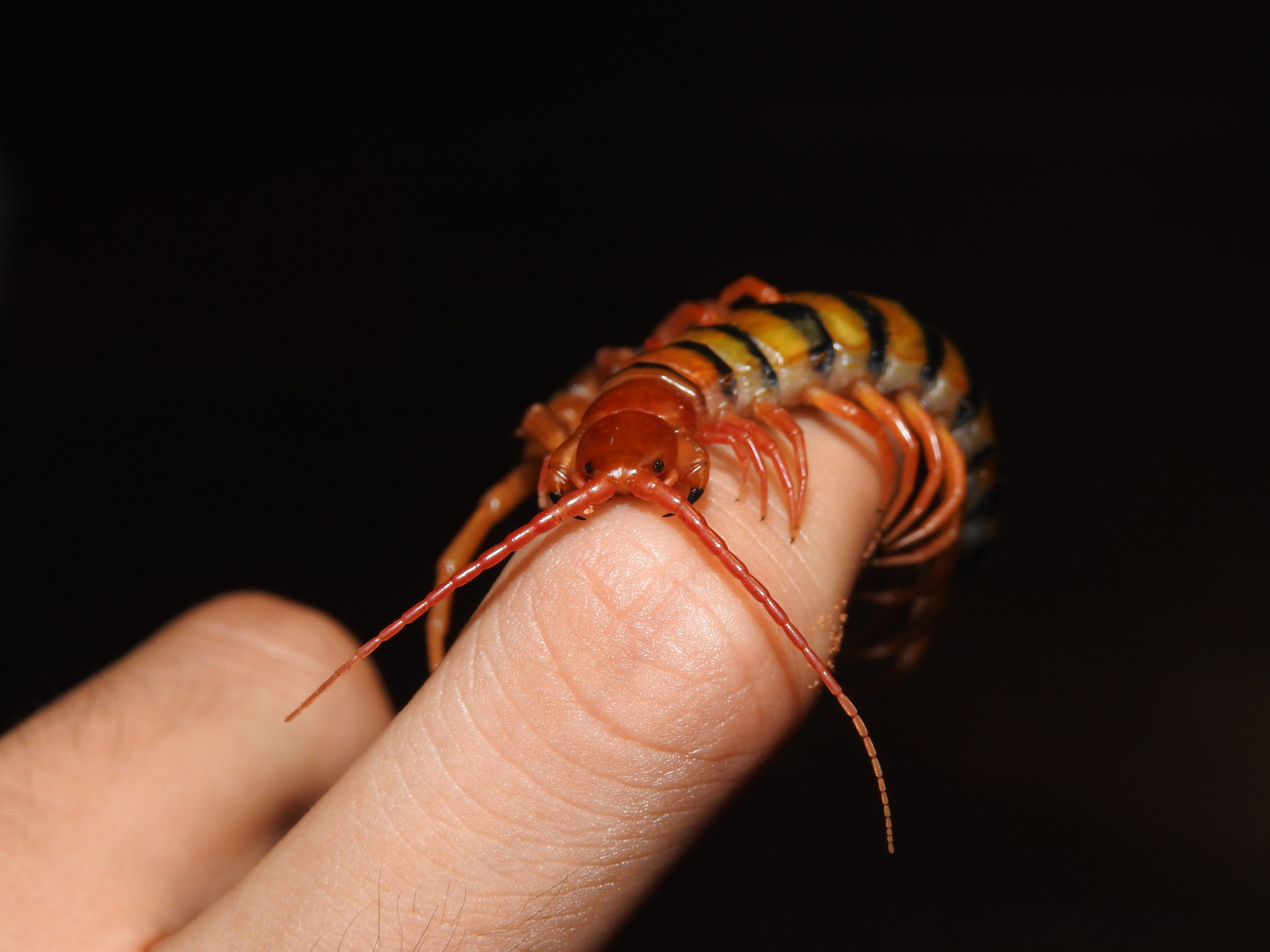

Scientific classification
- Kingdom: Animalia
- Phylum: Arthropoda
- Subphylum: Myriapoda
- Class: Chilopoda
- Order: Scolopendromorpha
- Family: Scolopendridae
- Genus: Scolopendra
- Species: S. morsitans

Binomial name
- Scolopendra morsitans Linnaeus, 1758

= Scolopendra morsitans =

Species of centipede

Scolopendra morsitans, also known as the Tanzanian blue ringleg or red-headed centipede, is a species of centipede in the family Scolopendridae. S. morsitans is the type species for the genus Scolopendra.

Adult Tanzanian blue ringlegs grow to around 13 centimetres (5.1 in) and are generally characterised by bright red heads and striated body segments; however, their colouration varies widely across regional populations. The species is found across all inhabited continents and is highly invasive. The centipede is an aggressive and opportunistic predator which hunts primarily at night and feeds on other arthropods and some small vertebrates, using a neurotoxic venom and its strong jaws to capture, incapacitate and digest its prey. The species prefers warm environments and is often found beneath leaves, bark and other substrate on the ground.

S. morsitans should not be confused with the giant red-headed centipede (Scolopendra heros), Chinese red-headed centipede (Scolopendra subspines), or the Tanzanian blue ring centipede (Ethmostigmus trignopdus), all of which have similar sounding common names to S. morsitans.

== Taxonomy ==
Scolopendra morsitans was first described by Carl Linnaeus in his book 10th edition of Systema Naturae in 1758 and has since retained its original scientific name. The species was nominated as the type species of the centipede genus Scolopendra in a submission to the International Commission on Zoological Nomenclature in 1955 which was approved two years later. The name 'Scolopendra' is derived from a Greek term meaning 'biting earthworms' which was first used by Aristotle in his book Historia Animalium to refer to aquatic polychaetes and terrestrial centipedes. The word 'morsitans' means 'that bites' in Latin, a name that is shared with a species of tsetse fly (Glossina morsitans).

There are two recognised subspecies of S. morsitans—Scolopendra morsitans morsitans, which was first described by Linnaeus in 1758 to refer to a species locality in India, and Scolopendra morsitans coerulescens, which was described by Francis Cragin and refers to a species locality first found in Kansas in the United States. The species is monophyletic and occupies a clade with Scolopendra pinguis, which is the most closely related member of the genus Scolopendra to S. morsitans.

== Description ==
Tanzanian blue ringlegs have been recorded to grow to lengths of up to 127 mm (5.0 in) in Australian populations, though in other regions, including Southeast Asia, they rarely exceed 100 mm (3.9 in). Because S. morsitans populations differ greatly in colouration, using colour alone to identify the species can be misleading. However, adults are generally characterised by a bright red head and brownish body with distinct striations between each body segment. Juveniles lack clear stripes and often have a head that is a similar colour to their body trunk. In field observations, the species can sometimes be distinguished from other Scolopendras by its relatively thick rear legs (known as ultimate legs).

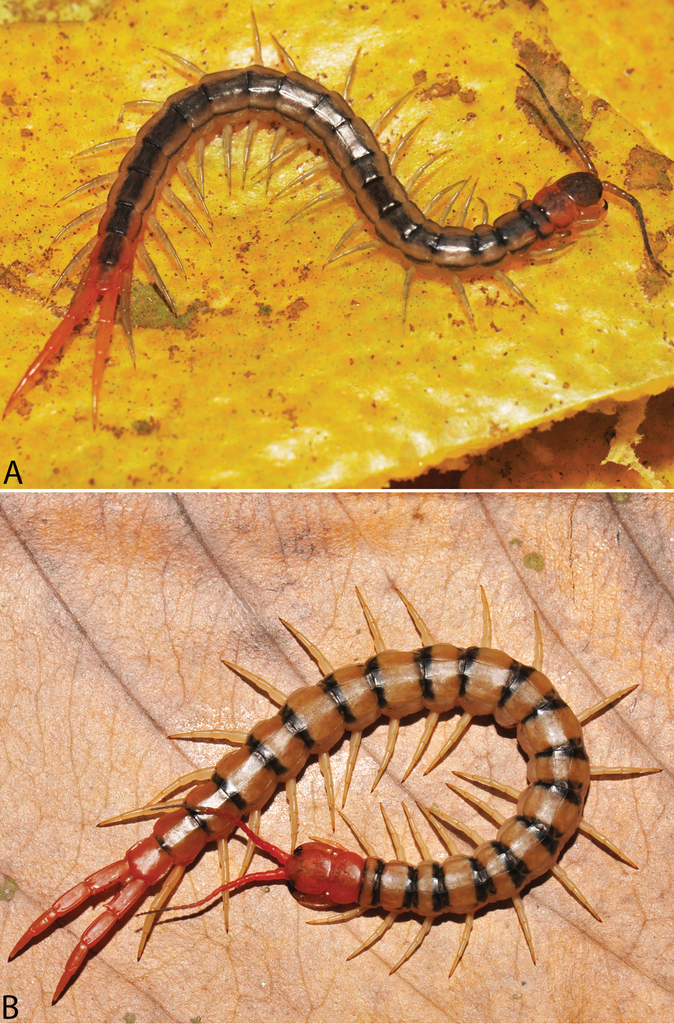
Juvenile (A) and adult (B) Tanzanian blue ringlegs found in South-East Asia.

In north-western Thailand, adult Tanzanian blue ringlegs have dark blackish heads and ultimate legs, whilst in north-east Thailand and Cambodia the centipedes have bright red heads and ultimate legs. Similar variations in colour have been observed across Australia and Africa. The centipede's antennae typically have 18–20 segments (occasionally 17 or 21–23), with the 5–7 segments closest to the head having dorsally facing hairs and the next 5–8 having ventrally facing hairs. Their tooth plates contain 5–6 teeth. Body segments 7–20 contain visible lines (known as paramedian sutures) surrounding the centre of the trunk, while the final segment of the centipede has a central line known as a medial suture. The centipede does not display obvious sexual dimorphism so subtle differences between the lateral margins of the tergites of male and female individuals are used as a visible determinant of sex.

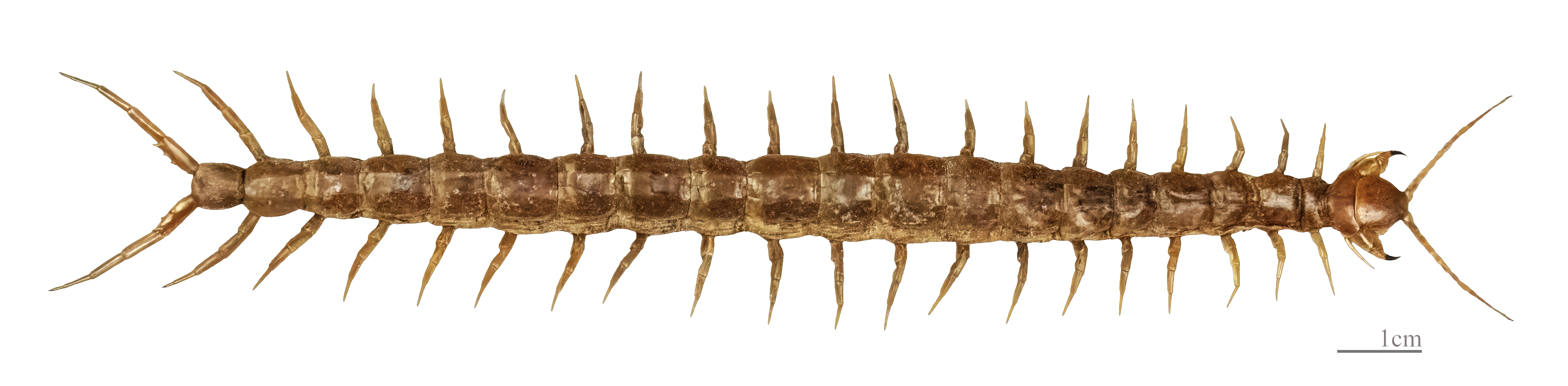
specimen of Scolopendra morsitans Upper face

== Distribution ==
The Tanzanian blue ringleg occupies a cosmopolitan distribution, and is found across all major continents; however, it has not been widely documented in Europe. It is thought to be native to the majority of continental Australia (with the exception of Victoria, South Australia, and south-western Western Australia), Africa (except for the Eritrean Highlands and Red Sea Hills), most of South and South East Asia, Madagascar and Sri Lanka. The centipede has been introduced to much of the Americas, with sightings outside its native range in Peru, Mexico, Argentina, the Bahamas and the Southern United States. It has been proposed that the preference of red-headed centipedes for habitats similar to the conditions on ships has resulted in their widespread invasion of inhabited areas.

The species occupies a diverse range of habitats, from the arid and semi-arid outback of Australia to the diverse tropics and temperate zones of India and tropical rainforests of Southeast Asia. Tanzanian blue ringlegs have a preference for warmer climates and the range of the centipede appears to be limited by this affinity. Additionally, the centipede requires sufficient air humidity to survive which limits its habitat choice and distribution. Individual populations of Tanzanian blue ringlegs are known to differ in physical characteristics based on their local geographical distributions, this has prompted the creation of over 50 synonyms for S. morsitans in scientific literature, largely due to misidentification of location specific populations of the species.

Tanzanian blue ringlegs are sometimes kept in captivity as pets and are traded and sold internationally for prices averaging around US$35 online.

== Life cycle ==
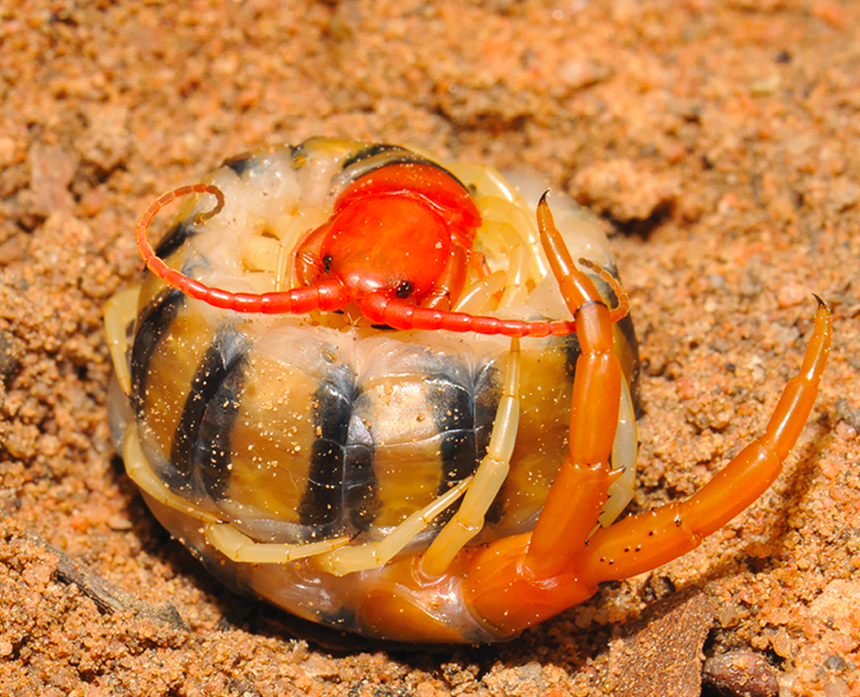
A Tanzanian blue ringleg in a maternal double coil

Male centipedes produce sperm-containing packets known as spermatophores wrapped in a silk-like substance which they then deposit in the sexual organs of female centipedes. The sexual organs of male and female Tanzanian blue ringlegs are not visually distinct, and examination of an individual's tergites is required to reliably determine its sex. Female centipedes construct brood chambers under substrate in protected areas for their young, laying clutches of 22–86 eggs and displaying extended parental care by forming a double coil around their eggs, newly hatched instar embryos, and post embryonic young. When threatened, or otherwise stressed, mothers guarding their offspring are known to engage in filial cannibalism, consuming their own eggs or embryos in order to minimise the energetic loss associated with an attack or perilous situation.

Because the Tanzanian blue ringleg finds shelter beneath leaves, logs and other ground substrate and is primarily active at night, very little is known about the species' natural biology, including precise information relating to their lifespan or length to maturity. However, the closely related Scolopendra subspinipes is known to live for upwards of 10 years on average. In captivity, S. morsitans has been reported to live for around 4 years.

== Behaviour ==
Centipedes of the family Scolopendridae are known to be opportunistic, generalist predators which primarily capture and kill live prey. They use their front facing fangs, known as forcipules, to both hold and envenomate their prey, which most commonly consists of small arthropods. Other species of the Scolopendra genus such as the Amazonian giant centipede (Scolopendra gigantea) and Scolopendra alternans have been observed feeding on large arachnids such as scorpions, toads, small snakes, and even mice and bats. Some Scolopendra are known to use their anterior walking legs or ultimate legs to catch and hold prey for envenomation. Blue ringleng forcipules are able to detect chemicals such as glucose and can act as sensory organs in the centipede, providing evidence that they play a role in its ability to taste and interact with its environment.

Tanzanian blue ringlegs, along with other centipedes of the genus Scolopendra, are known to use their ultimate legs in threat displays—raising the appendages aggressively when approached from behind. This behaviour is thought to be a form of automimicry, confusing potential predators by disguising their vulnerable flanks as their fang-bearing heads.

== Toxicology ==
Tanzanian blue ringleg venom is neurotoxic and acts on the nervous systems of invertebrates, and autonomic nervous system of vertebrates, to rapidly paralyse and kill the centipede's prey. The centipede's venom contains serotonin, which causes a pain response, as well as a mix of proteins, enzymes, lipoproteins, cholesterol, triglycerides, cholesteryl esters, squalene, free fatty acids, and phospholipids. Although the exact action of the fatty components of the centipede's venom are unknown, removing the fatty portion of other venoms, such as that of the Indian cobra, is known to significantly reduce the lethality of the venom in vertebrates by a factor of 40–50%. The protein components of the centipede's venom bear close resemblance to the venom compositions of scorpions and spiders such as the Mexican scorpion Centruroides limpidus, the black widow spider, and the brown recluse spider.

Esterases in the venom of the Tanzanian blue ringleg were the first active enzymes to be found in the venom of any centipede, and were discovered by researchers at Ain Shams University in 1983. The presence of enzymes in the centipede's venom such as estirases, acid and alkaline phosphatases, and proteases, allows the Tanzanian blue ringleg to digest its prey outside of its body, sucking the broken down components of the animals that it captures out of their body cavities. This helps the centipedes consume the edible components of arthropods through their tough, chitinous exoskeletons.

A transferrin protein, a class of protein which plays a role in the mammalian circulatory system, has been found in the venom of the Tanzanian blue ringleng along with the scutigerid centipede Thereuopoda longicornis and the scolopendrid Ethmostigmus rubripes. Transferrins are thought to function in support of the blue ringleg's immunity as they are known to display antibacterial properties in invertebrates. Some components of centipede venom, including that of S. morsitans, are thought to result from bacterial and fungal genes that have been horizontally transferred by microorganisms throughout the evolutionary history of the chilopods. Centipedes are the only known animals with a venom resulting at least in part from the horizontal transfer of genes from several other families of organisms.

In cases of human bites, the venom of the Tanzanian blue ringleg is known to produce redness, swelling, and in some cases, severe pain. Although robust case studies of S. morsitans are limited, bites of the closely related Scolopendrid, Scolopendra subspinipes, can result in severe edema and pronounced localised swelling.
