= S. laeta =

S. laeta may refer to:

- Scolopendra laeta, a tropical centipede
- Senegalia laeta, a perennial legume
- Simianellus laeta, a polyphagan beetle
- Smaragdina laeta, a short-horned leaf beetle
- Smicropus laeta, a geometer moth
- Smidtia laeta, a tachina fly
- Splendrillia laeta, a sea snail
- Strophiona laeta, a lepturine beetle
- Styphelia laeta, a heather endemic to Australia and the Pacific Islands
- Synemon laeta, an Australian moth
