= Scolopendra paradoxa =

Scientific classification
- Kingdom: Animalia
- Phylum: Arthropoda
- Subphylum: Myriapoda
- Class: Chilopoda
- Order: Scolopendromorpha
- Family: Scolopendridae
- Genus: Scolopendra
- Species: S. paradoxa

Binomial name
- Scolopendra paradoxa Doménech, 2018

Species of centipede

Scolopendra paradoxa is a species of centipede in the family Scolopendridae. The centipede is endemic to the Philippines. It is one of the few known amphibious centipedes along with Scolopendra cataracta and Scolopendra alcyona.

S. paradoxa grows to 14 cm (5.5 in) in length and has teal-coloured legs.

Carles Doménech, the person who first described the species gained minor controversy after it was found that the specimens were obtained illegally.
