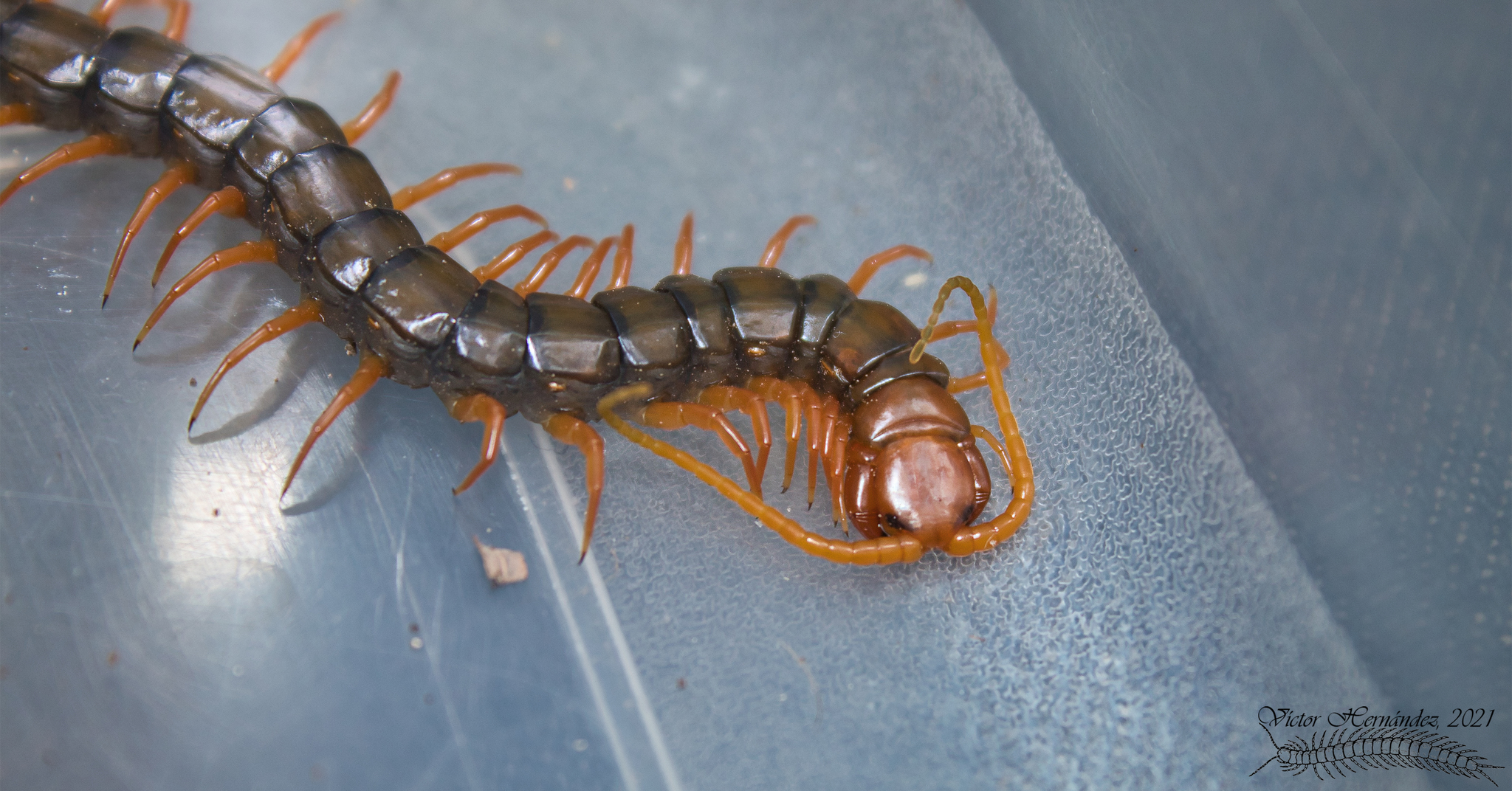

Scientific classification
- Kingdom: Animalia
- Phylum: Arthropoda
- Subphylum: Myriapoda
- Class: Chilopoda
- Order: Scolopendromorpha
- Family: Scolopendridae
- Genus: Scolopendra
- Species: S. sumichrasti

Binomial name
- Scolopendra sumichrasti Saussure, 1860

= Scolopendra sumichrasti =

Species of centipede

Scolopendra sumichrasti is a species of arthropod; a scolopendrid centipede found in Latin America.

== Distribution ==
Scolopendra sumichrasti has been recorded from Honduras, Belize, Guatemala, Panama, and Mexico.

== Taxonomy ==
A 2006 paper suggested that Scolopendra sumichrasti could be a synonym of Scolopendra pomacea.

== Bite ==
The pain from the bite of Scolopendra sumichrasti is described as lasting between 15 and 30 minutes.

Scolopendra sumichrasti is one of several centipedes known to prey on bats.
