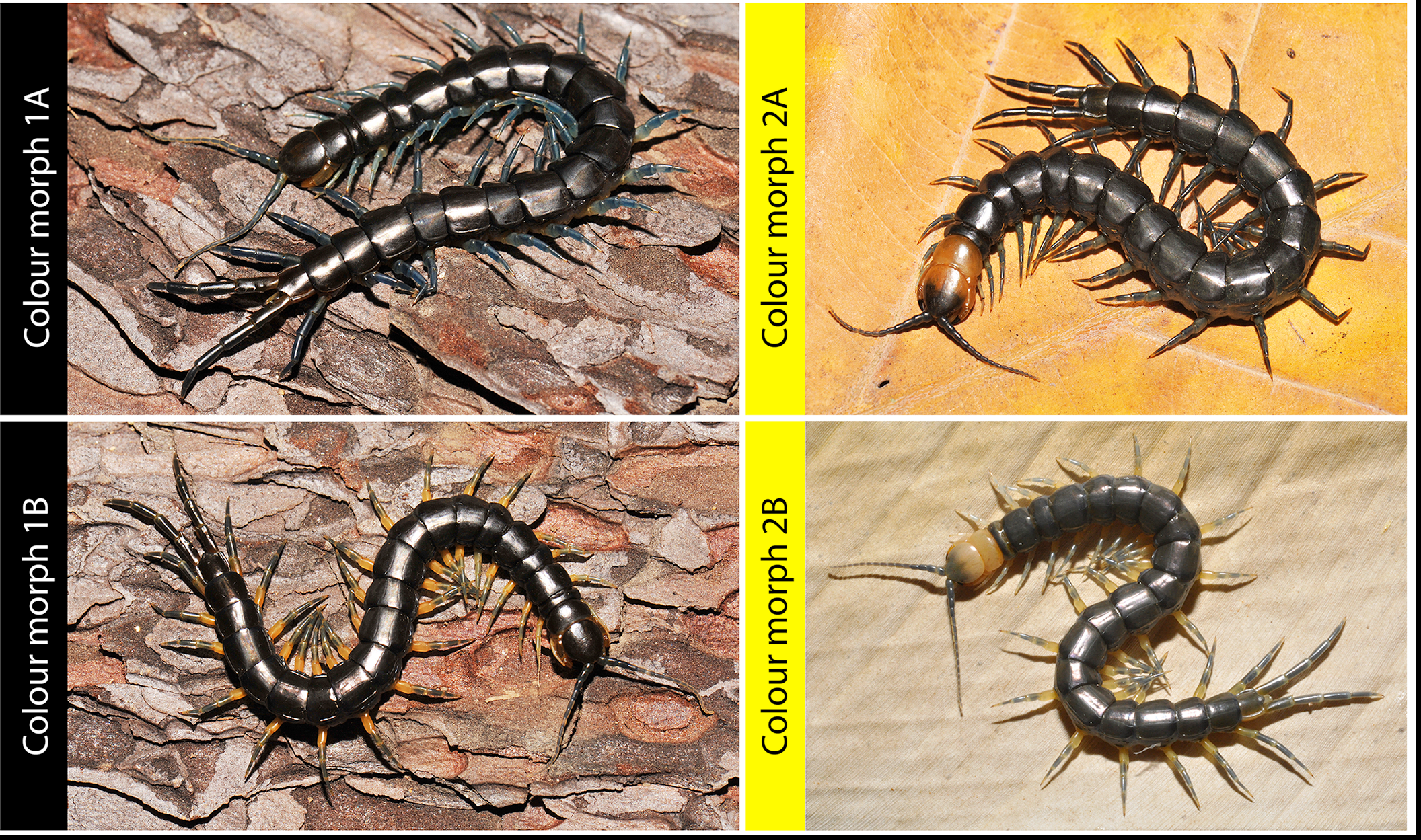

Scientific classification
- Kingdom: Animalia
- Phylum: Arthropoda
- Subphylum: Myriapoda
- Class: Chilopoda
- Order: Scolopendromorpha
- Family: Scolopendridae
- Genus: Scolopendra
- Species: S. pinguis

Binomial name
- Scolopendra pinguis Pocock, 1891

= Scolopendra pinguis =

Species of centipede

Scolopendra pinguis is a species of centipede in the subfamily Scolopendrinae that is endemic to Southeast Asia.

== Appearance ==
Scolopendra pinguis is small, growing around 6.4 cm in length. Its antennae are blue and hairless at the base, fading to pale blue and covered with fine, short hairs. They have 17 articles (antennae segments).

=== Colour morphs ===
Pocock initially described S. pinguis as "of a deep uniform olivaceous tint", but a 2015 paper described four colour morphs that can be separated into a blackish monocromatic population and a dichromatic blue/yellow one, which are presented below:

#	Head	Segments	Legs	Pleurites
1A	Dark blue	Dark blue	All blue; legs 19-21 dark blue.	Black with pale blue integument.
1B	Dark blue	Dark blue	Yellowish on prefemur, with other articles pale blue with yellowish banding near joints. Last three legs dark blue to black.	Black with pale blue integument.
2A	Dark blue in front, yellow in back	First tergite yellow, other tergites dark blue.	Dark blue to black	Black with pale blue integument.
2B	Dark blue in front, yellow in back	First tergite yellow, others blue to bluish-grey.	Yellowish on prefemur, with other articles pale blue with yellowish banding near joints.	Black with pale blue integument.

References for information in table:.
