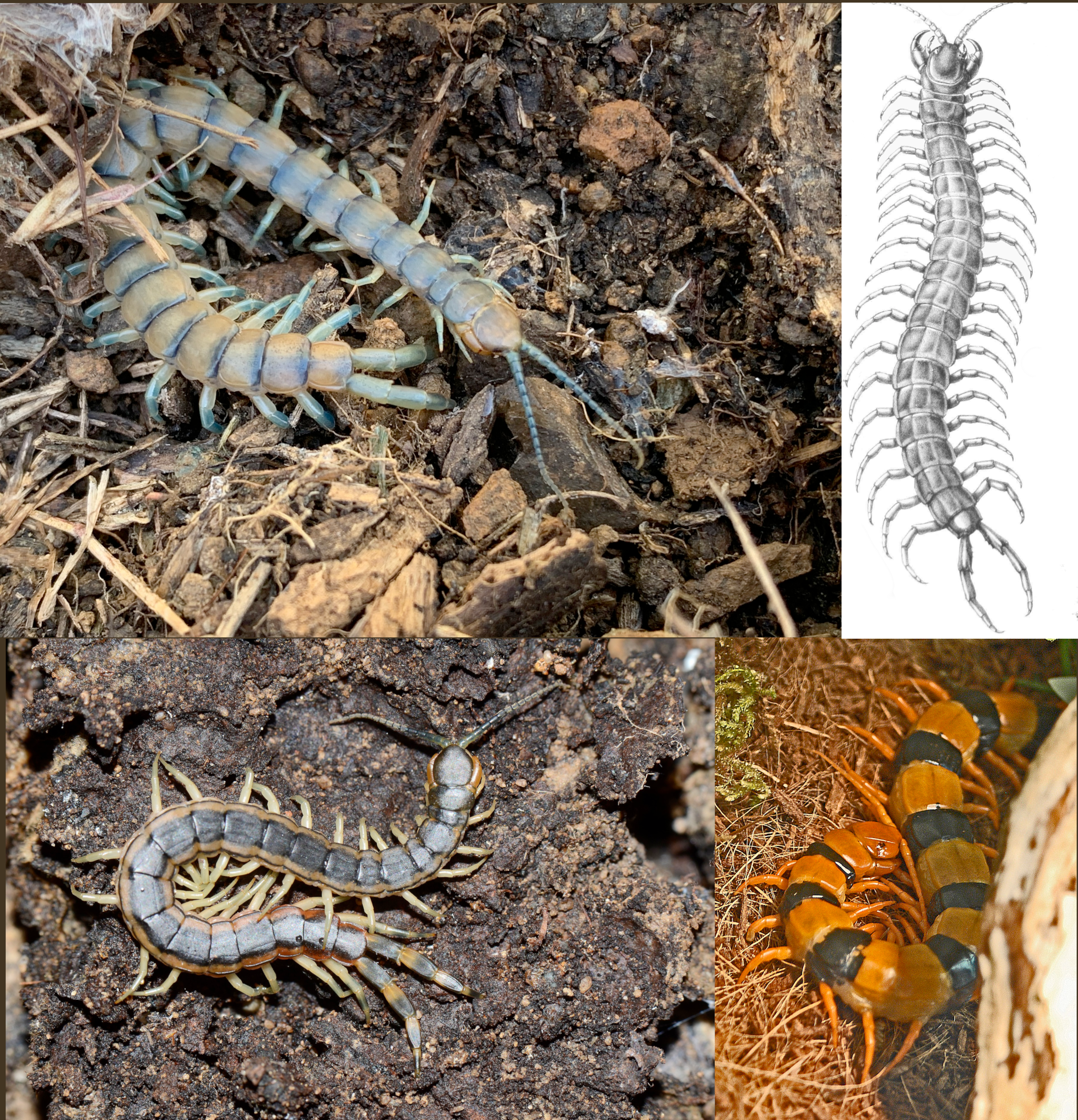

Scientific classification
- Kingdom: Animalia
- Phylum: Arthropoda
- Subphylum: Myriapoda
- Class: Chilopoda
- Order: Scolopendromorpha
- Family: Scolopendridae
- Genus: Scolopendra; Linnaeus, 1758

Type species
- Scolopendra morsitans Linnaeus, 1758

= Scolopendra =

Scolopendra Temporal range: Eocene–Recent

Genus of centipedes

Scolopendra (from Ancient Greek σκόλοψ (skólops), meaning "thorn", and ἔντερον (énteron), meaning "earthworm") is a species-rich genus of large tropical centipedes of the family Scolopendridae.

== Description ==
The genus Scolopendra contains many species of centipedes found across the world's tropics and warmer temperate areas. The species vary considerably in coloration and size. Scolopendra are mostly very large centipedes. The largest species found in tropical climates can exceed 30 cm (12 in) and are the largest living centipedes in the world. All Scolopendra species can deliver a painful bite, injecting venom through their forcipules, which are not fangs or other mouthparts; rather, these are modified legs on the first body segment.

== Ecology ==
Scolopendra species are active predators, feeding primarily on insects and other invertebrates. Larger specimens have been observed preying on frogs, tarantulas, lizards, birds, snakes, rodents, and even bats. Two southeast Asian species, S. cataracta and S. paradoxa, as well as S. alcyona from the Ryukyu Islands, are amphibious, as these species can travel underwater by swimming or walking.

== Venom ==
The venom of most species is not medically significant; however, bites from several species can cause intense and long-lasting pain and swelling. Large Scolopendra species from Asian/Pacific regions, such as Scolopendra subspinipes and Scolopendra dehaani, are particularly potent, and have caused one reported fatality. In 2014, a fatality was reported for a bite from a Scolopendra gigantea. The venom of certain Scolopendra species was found to contain compounds such as serotonin, haemolytic phospholipase, a cardiotoxic protein, and a cytolysin.

== Taxonomic history ==
Scolopendra was one of the genera created by Carl Linnaeus in his 1758 10th edition of Systema Naturae, the starting point for zoological nomenclature. Only two of the species originally assigned to the genus remain so: Scolopendra gigantea and S. morsitans; the latter was chosen to be the type species by Opinion 454 of the International Commission on Zoological Nomenclature, overruling a previous designation by Pierre André Latreille, in which he chose Linnaeus' Scolopendra forficata (now Lithobius forficatus) as the type species.

== Species ==
The genus Scolopendra contains these species:

- Scolopendra abnormis Lewis & Daszak, 1996
- Scolopendra afer (Meinert, 1886)
- Scolopendra alcyona Tsukamoto & Shimano, 2021
- Scolopendra algerina Newport, 1845
- Scolopendra alternans Leach, 1813
- Scolopendra andhrensis Jangi & Dass, 1984
- Scolopendra angulata Newport, 1844
- Scolopendra angusticollis Murray, 1887
- Scolopendra anomia Newport, 1844
- Scolopendra appendiculata Daday, 1891
- Scolopendra arenicola (Lawrence, 1975)
- Scolopendra arthrorhabdoides Ribaut, 1912
- Scolopendra attemsi Lewis, Minelli & Shelley, 2006
- Scolopendra aztecorum Verhoeff, 1934
- Scolopendra calcarata Porat, 1876
- Scolopendra canidens Newport, 1844
- Scolopendra cataracta Siriwut, Edgecombe & Panha, 2016
- Scolopendra childreni Newport, 1844
- Scolopendra chlora Chamberlin, 1942
- Scolopendra chlorotes C. L. Koch, 1856
- Scolopendra cingulata Latreille, 1829
- Scolopendra clavipes C. L. Koch, 1847
- Scolopendra concolor Newport, 1845
- Scolopendra crassa Templeton, 1846
- Scolopendra cretica Attems, 1902
- Scolopendra cribrifera Gervais, 1847
- Scolopendra crudelis C. L. Koch, 1847
- Scolopendra dalmatica C. L. Koch, 1847
- Scolopendra dawydoffi Kronmüller, 2012
- Scolopendra dehaani Brandt, 1840
- Scolopendra ellorensis Jangi & Dass, 1984
- Scolopendra fissispina L. Koch, 1865
- Scolopendra foveolata Verhoeff, 1937
- Scolopendra galapagoensis Bollman, 1889
- Scolopendra gigantea Linnaeus, 1758
- Scolopendra gracillima Attems, 1898
- Scolopendra hainanum Kronmüller, 2012
- Scolopendra hardwickei Newport, 1844
- Scolopendra hermosa Chamberlin, 1941
- Scolopendra heros Girard, 1853
- Scolopendra horrida C. L. Koch, 1847
- Scolopendra inaequidens Gervais, 1847
- Scolopendra indiae (Chamberlin, 1914)
- Scolopendra indica Meinert, 1886
- Scolopendra inermipes C. L. Koch, 1847
- Scolopendra inermis Newport, 1845
- Scolopendra jangii Khanna & Yadav, 1997
- Scolopendra japonica Koch, 1878
- Scolopendra koreana (Verhoeff, 1934)
- Scolopendra labiata C. L. Koch, 1863
- Scolopendra laeta Haase, 1887
- Scolopendra langi (Chamberlin, 1927)
- Scolopendra latro Meinert, 1886
- Scolopendra leki (Waldock & Edgecombe 2012)
- Scolopendra limicolor Wood, 1861
- Scolopendra lucasii Gervais, 1847
- Scolopendra lufengia S. Kang et al., 2017
- Scolopendra lutea (Attems, 1928)
- Scolopendra madagascariensis Attems, 1910
- Scolopendra malkini Chamberlin, 1955
- Scolopendra mazbii Gravely, 1912
- Scolopendra media (Muralewicz, 1926)
- Scolopendra melionii Lucas, 1853
- Scolopendra metuenda Pocock, 1895
- Scolopendra michoacana Chamberlin, 1941
- Scolopendra mima Chamberlin, 1942
- Scolopendra mirabilis (Porat, 1876)
- Scolopendra monticola (Lawrence, 1975)
- Scolopendra morsitans Linnaeus, 1758
- Scolopendra multidens Newport, 1844
- Scolopendra negrocapitis Zhang & Wang, 1999
- Scolopendra nuda (Jangi & Dass, 1980)
- Scolopendra occidentalis F. Meinert, 1886
- Scolopendra octodentata Verhoeff, 1934
- Scolopendra oraniensis Lucas, 1846
- Scolopendra paradoxa Doménech, 2018
- Scolopendra pachygnatha Pocock, 1895
- Scolopendra paranuda (Khanna & Tripathi, 1987)
- Scolopendra pentagramma Motschoulsky, 1886
- Scolopendra pinguis Pocock, 1891
- Scolopendra polymorpha Wood, 1861
- Scolopendra pomacea C. L. Koch, 1847
- Scolopendra puncticeps Wood, 1861
- Scolopendra punensis Jangi & Dass, 1984
- Scolopendra robusta Kraepelin, 1903
- Scolopendra sanatillae Bollman, 1893
- Scolopendra silhetensis Newport, 1845
- Scolopendra spinipriva Bücherl, 1946
- Scolopendra spinosissima Kraepelin, 1903
- Scolopendra subspinipes Leach, 1816
- Scolopendra sumichrasti Saussure, 1860
- Scolopendra tenuitarsis Pocock, 1895
- Scolopendra teretipes (Porat,1893)
- Scolopendra valida Lucas, 1840
- Scolopendra violacea Fabricius, 1798
- Scolopendra viridicornis Newport, 1844
- Scolopendra viridipes Dufour, 1820
- Scolopendra viridis Say, 1821
- Scolopendra zuluana (Lawrence, 1958)

One fossil species, †Scolopendra proavita, is known from Baltic amber deposits from the Eocene of Poland. Fossil remains of a species tentatively assigned to S. morsitans (as S. (cf) morsitans) are also known from Pliocene-aged rocks in the Makapansgat of South Africa.

== Species gallery ==
Gallery
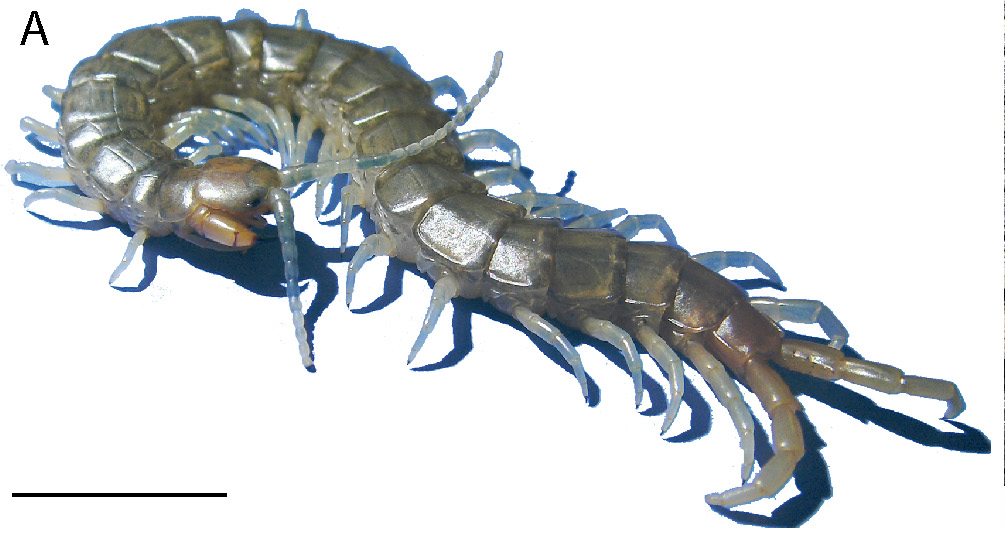
S. oraniensis

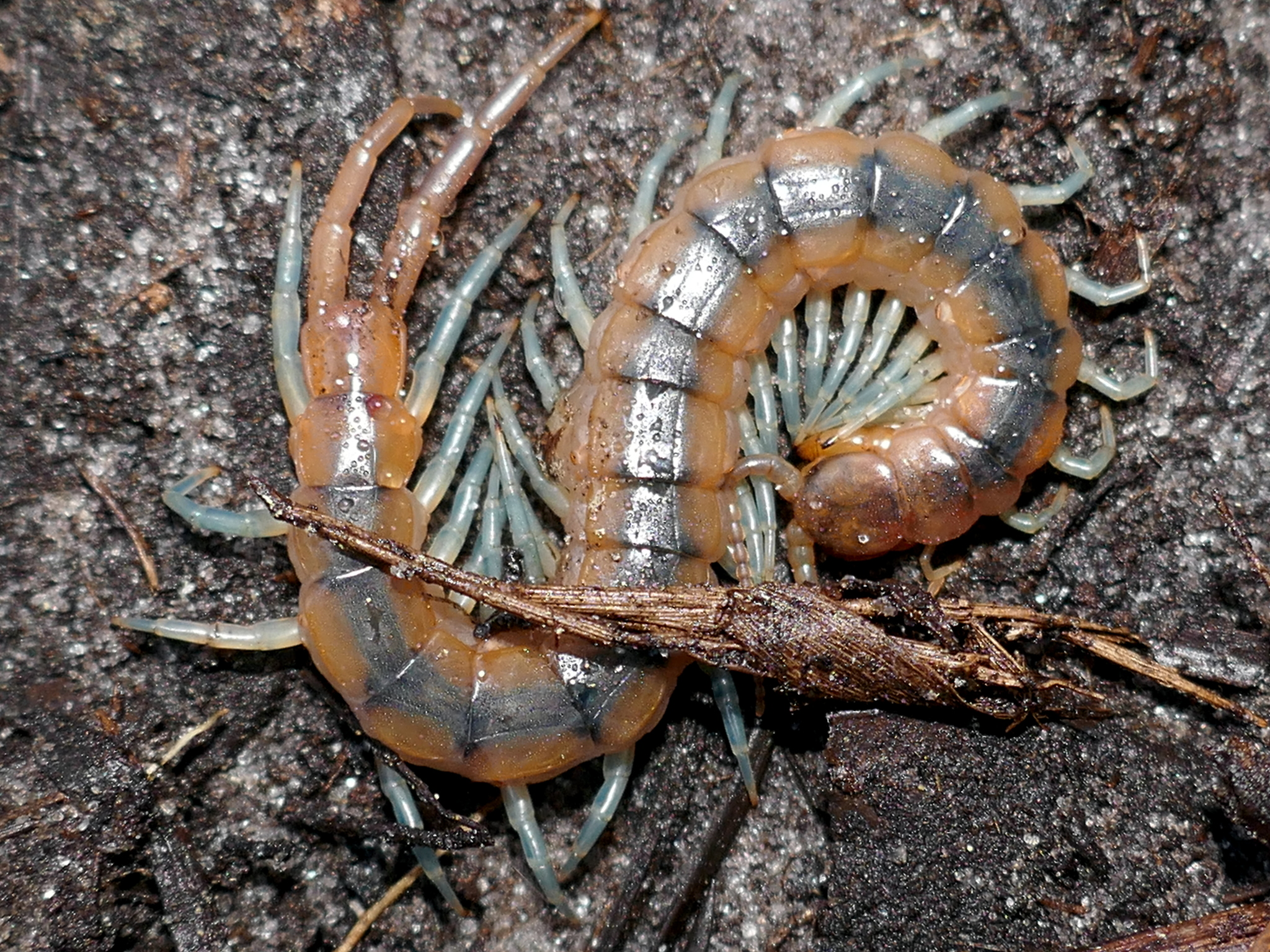
S. viridis

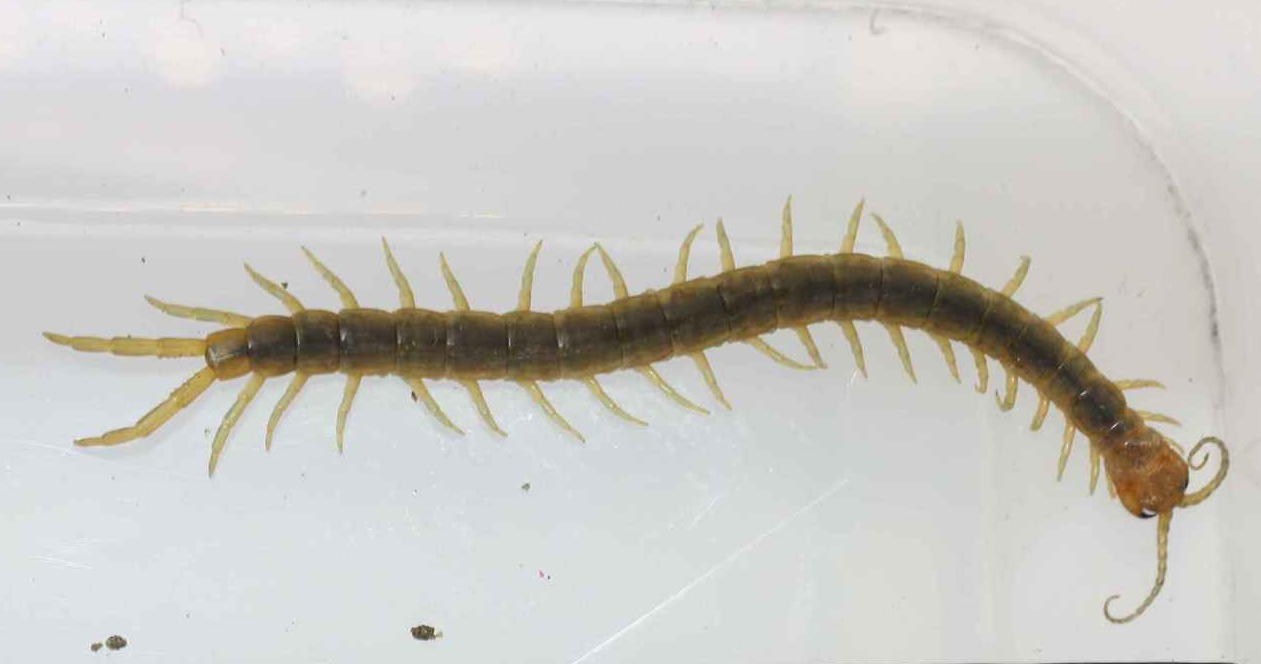
S. canidens

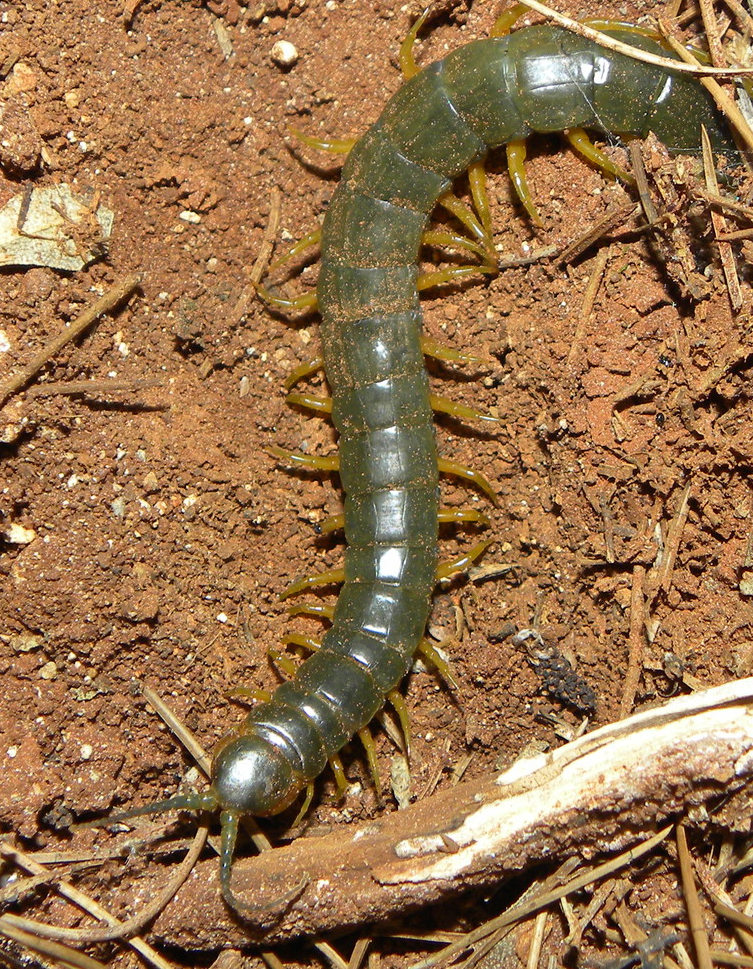
S. viridis maya

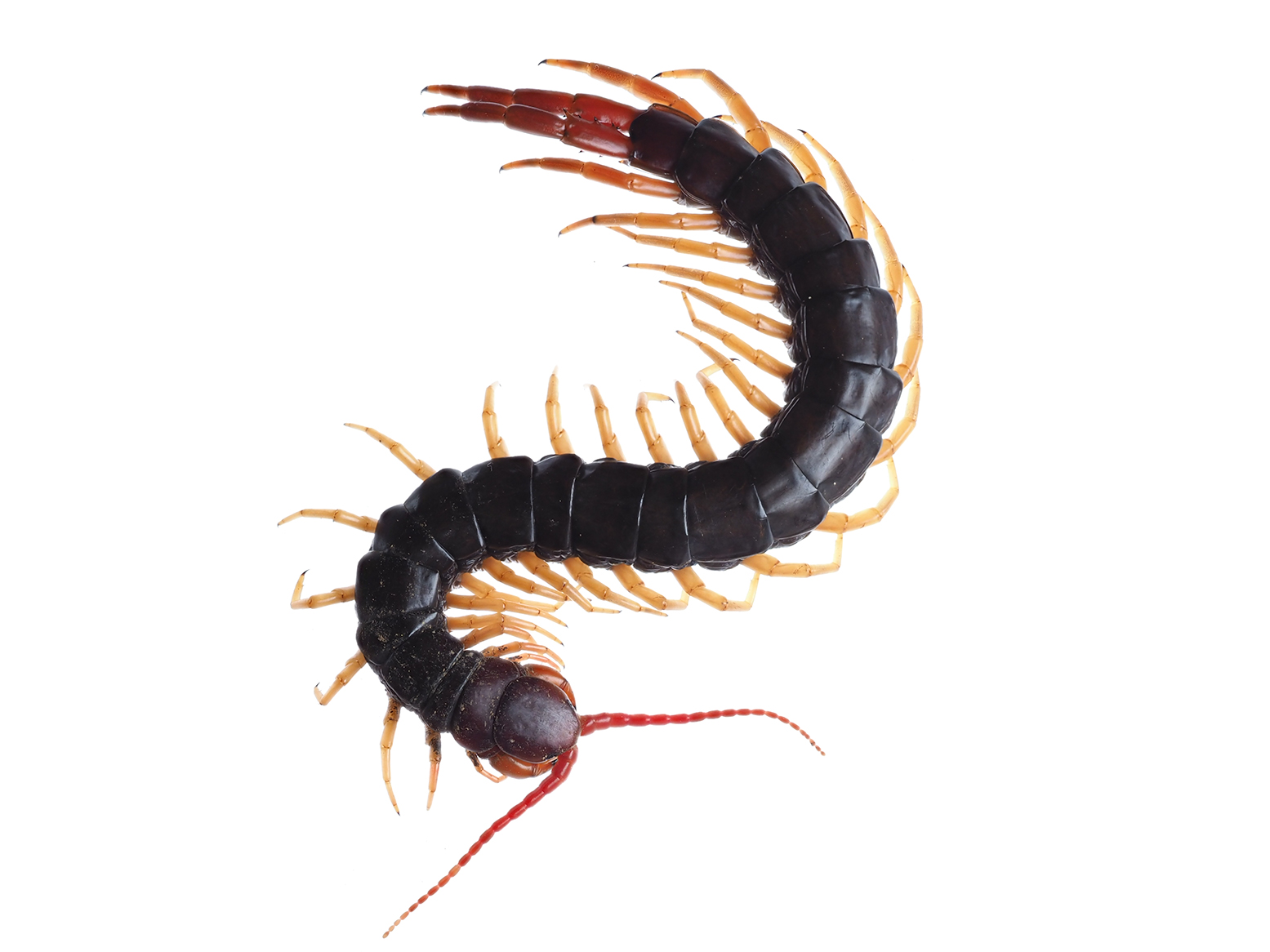
S. multidens

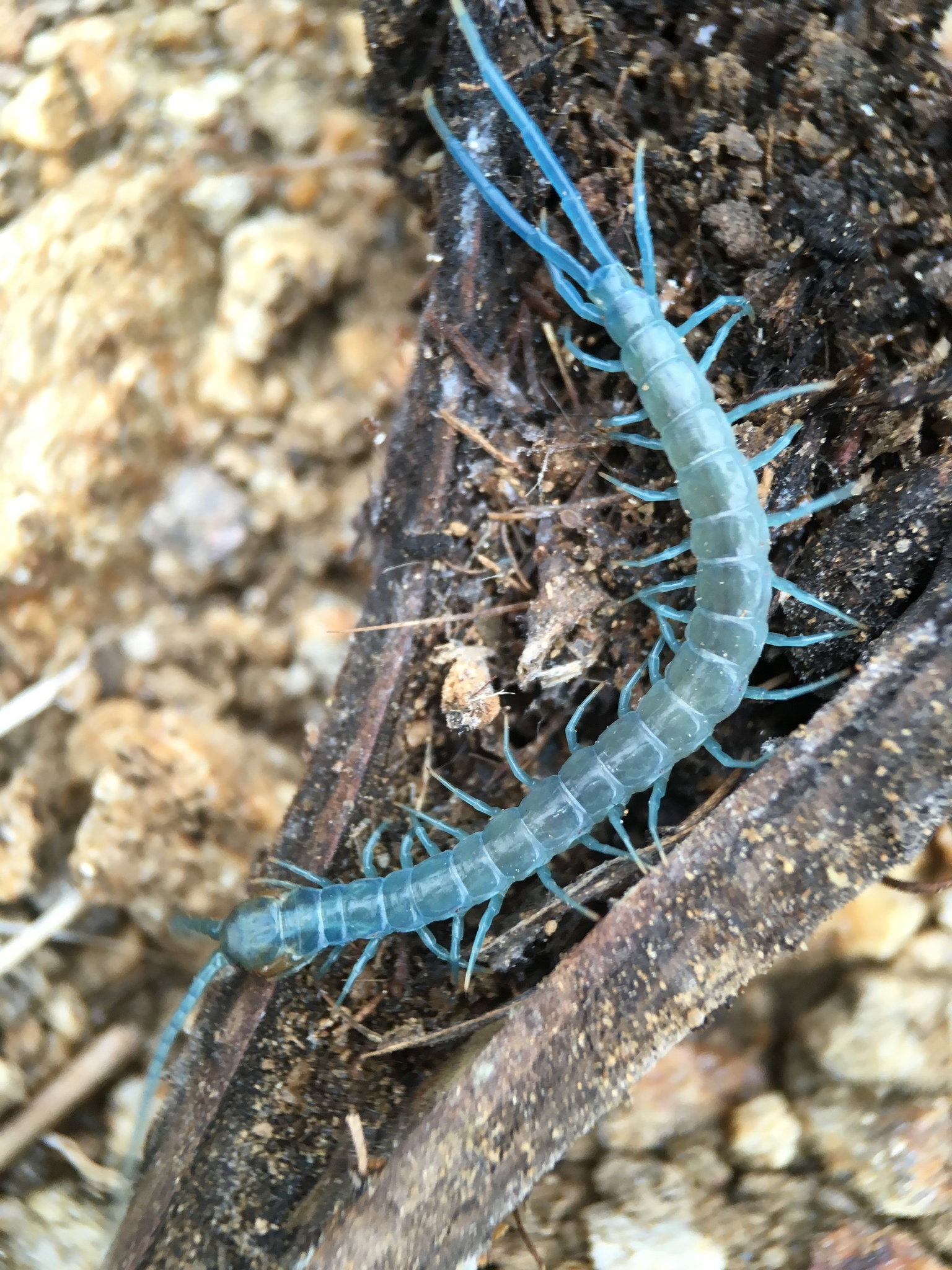
S. aztecorum

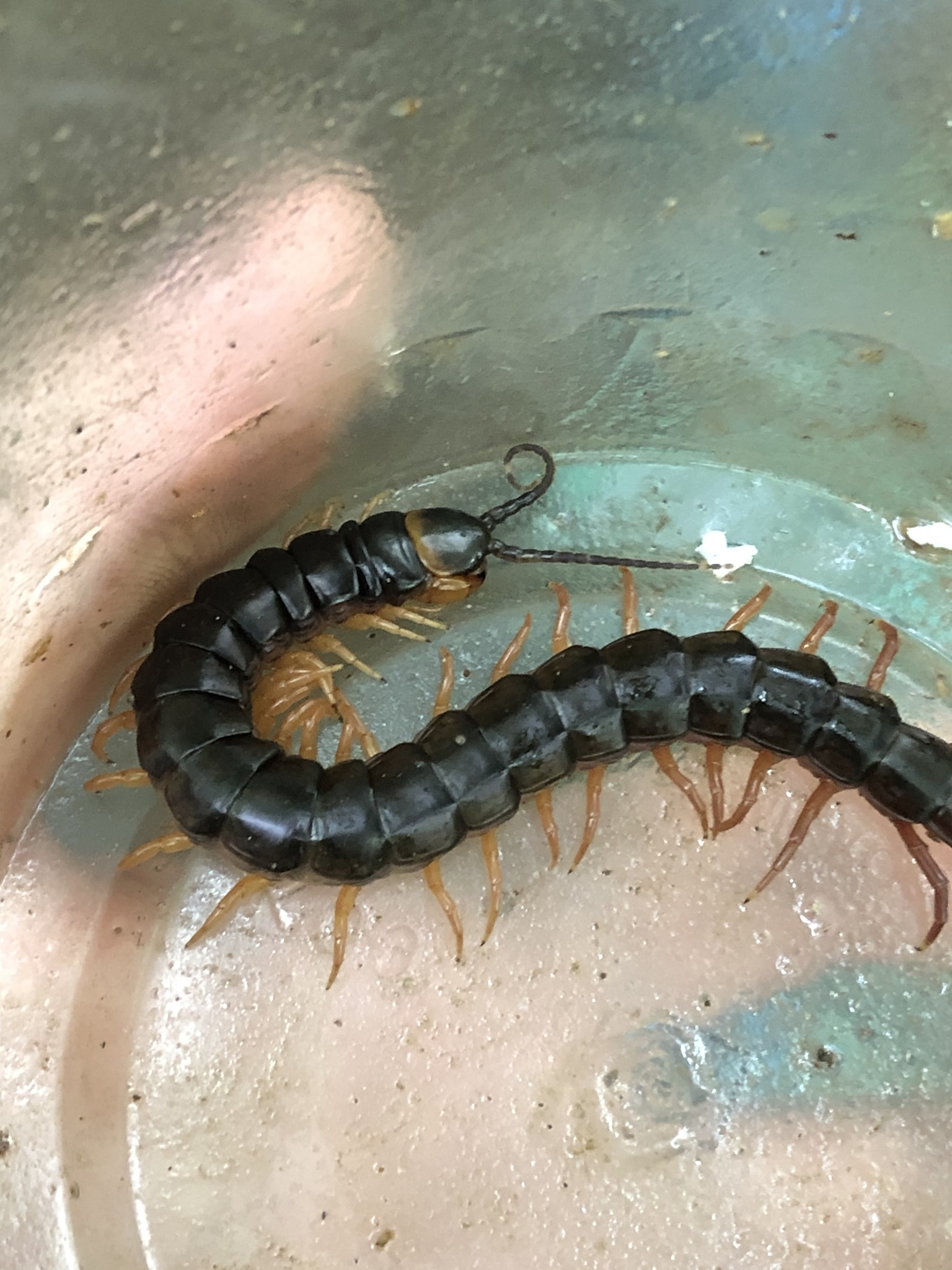
S. hermosa

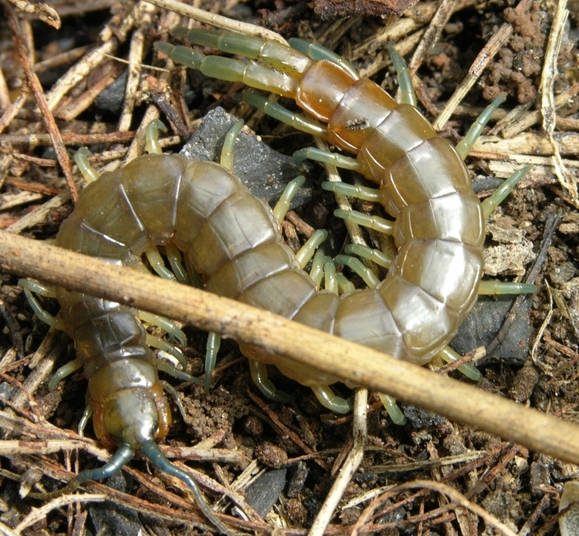
S. dalmatica

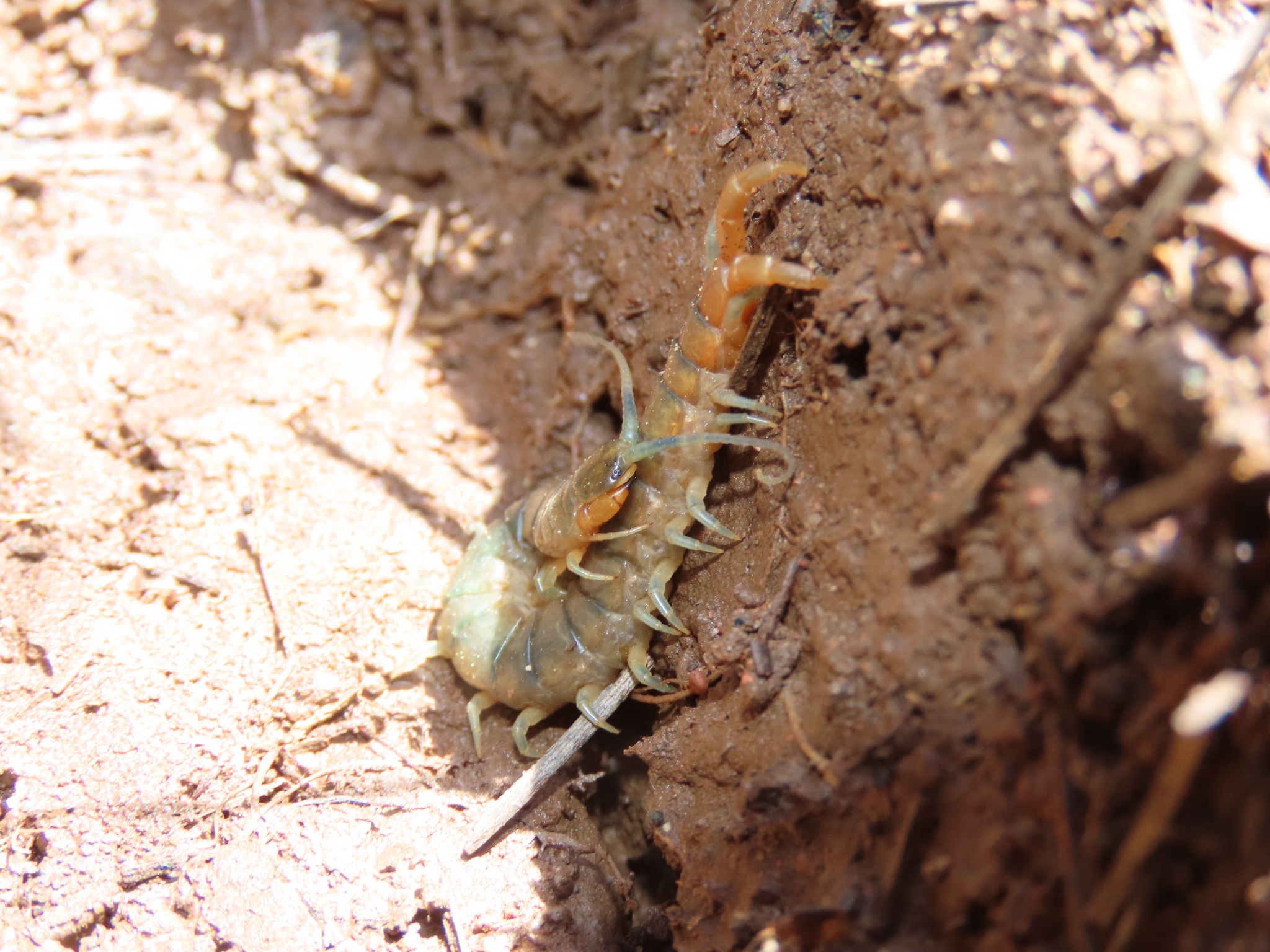
S. viridis viridis

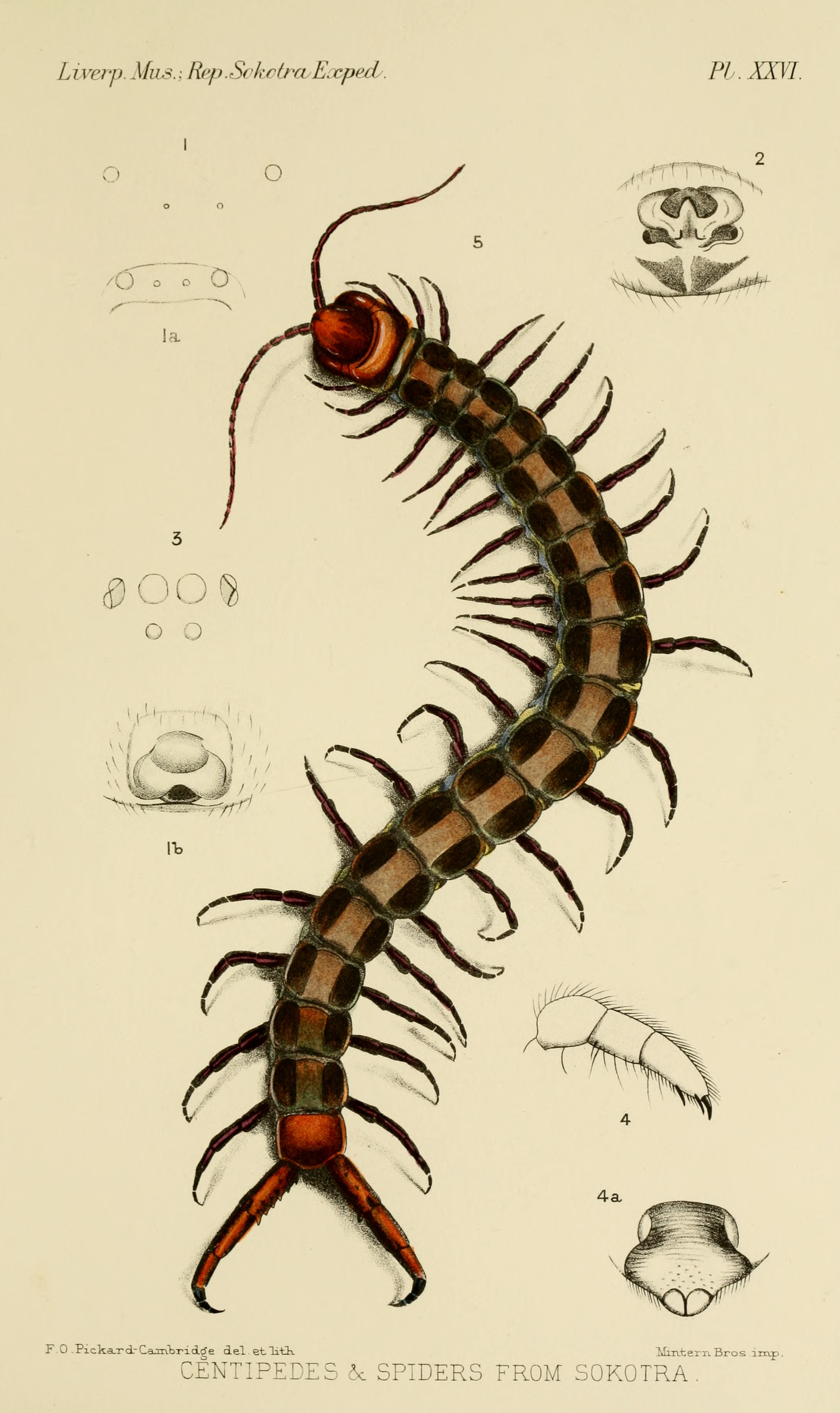
S. valida

== See also ==
- Gu (poison)
