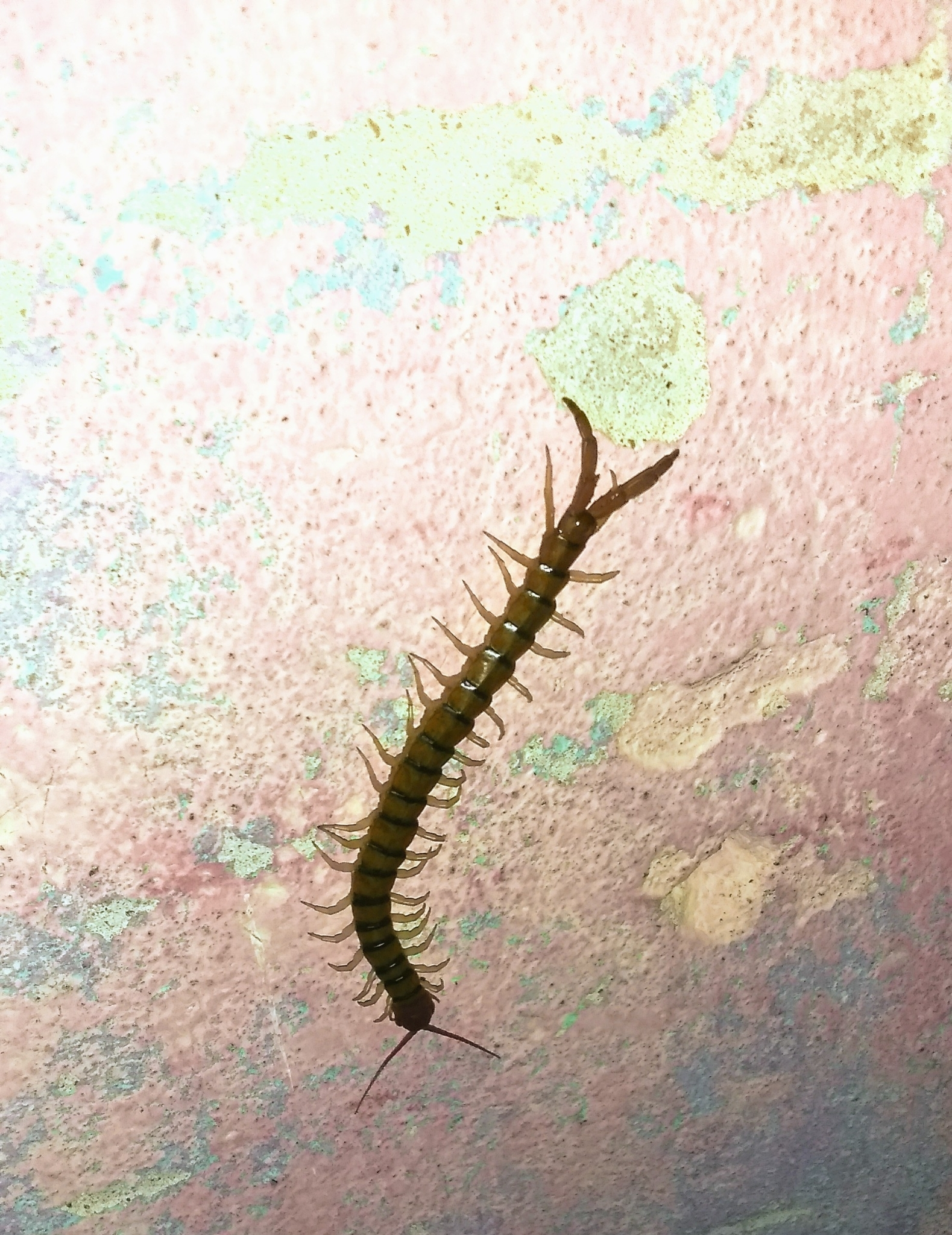

Scientific classification
- Domain: Eukaryota
- Kingdom: Animalia
- Phylum: Arthropoda
- Subphylum: Myriapoda
- Class: Chilopoda
- Order: Scolopendromorpha
- Family: Scolopendridae
- Genus: Scolopendra
- Species: S. angulata

Binomial name
- Scolopendra angulata Newport, 1844

= Scolopendra angulata =

Species of centipede

Scolopendra angulata is a species of centipede commonly found in Barbados. They are also found in Venezuela and neighbouring countries in South America and the Caribbean such as Ecuador and Colombia.

There are three subspecies; Scolopendra angulata angulata (Newport, 1844), Scolopendra angulata explorans (Chamberlin, 1914), and Scolopendra angulata moojeni (Bücherl, 1943). The latter subspecies is excluded by some sources. S. s. explorans was originally classified by Chamberlin as Scolopendra explorans, and was only proposed a subspecies of S. angulata by Bücherl in 1942 .
