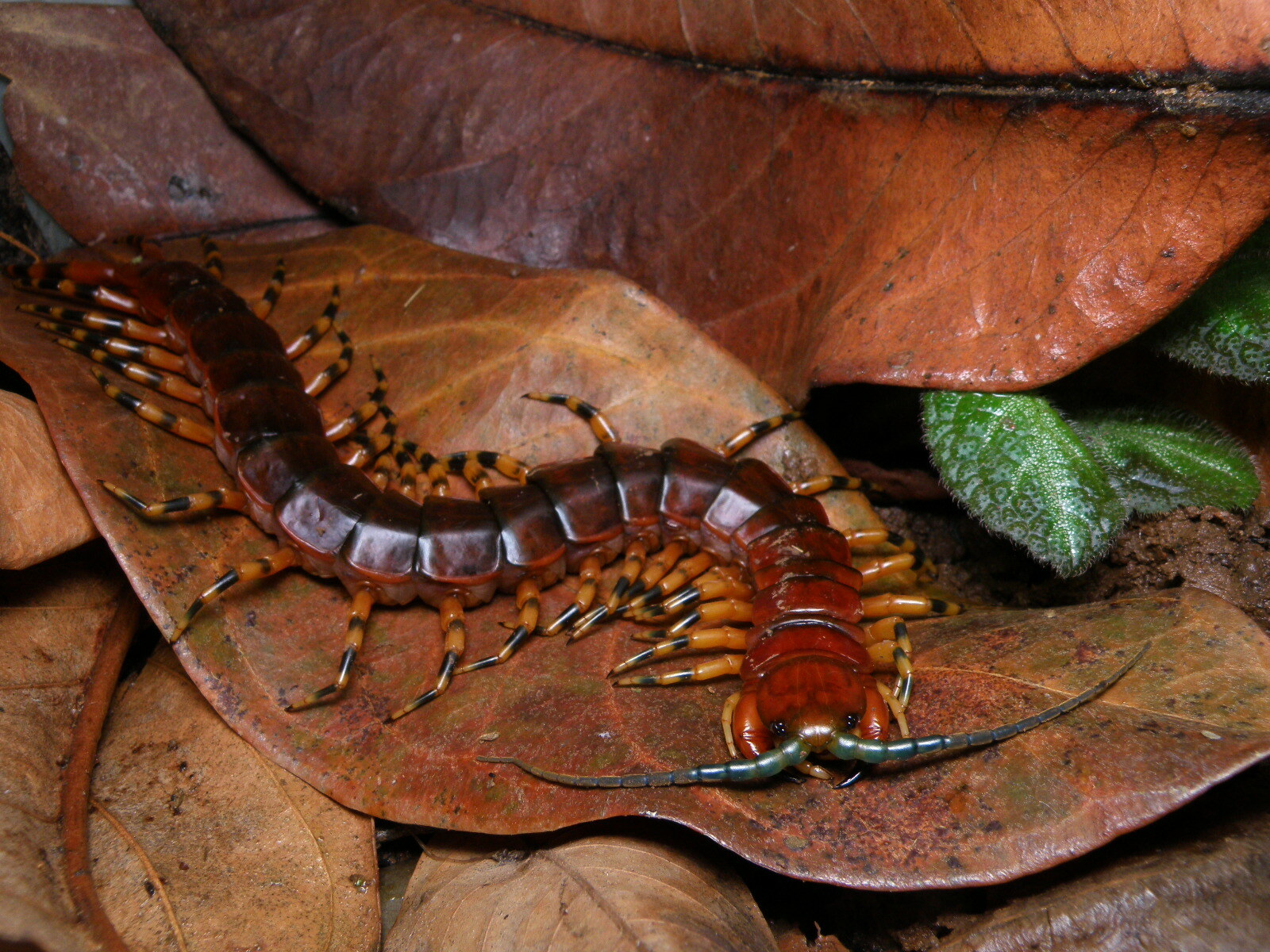

Scientific classification
- Domain: Eukaryota
- Kingdom: Animalia
- Phylum: Arthropoda
- Subphylum: Myriapoda
- Class: Chilopoda
- Order: Scolopendromorpha
- Family: Scolopendridae
- Genus: Scolopendra
- Species: S. viridicornis

Binomial name
- Scolopendra viridicornis Newport, 1844

= Scolopendra viridicornis =

Species of centipede

Scolopendra viridicornis is a species of centipede in the family Scolopendridae which can be found within the Amazon rainforest, the type locality being in Brazil. Due to the geographic distribution of this species it is known as the Brazilian giant centipede.

== Behavior and diet ==
As with the vast majority of species in this genus, Scolopendra viridicornis is carnivorous. It hunts actively, seizing any prey items small enough to be overpowered. Due to the large size of this centipede, its diet not only includes arthropods but may also consist of small vertebrates such as rodents, frogs, snakes and lizards. The centipede typically seizes and restrains prey with help from a muscular body and numerous legs, then delivers a venomous bite to subdue and kill the prey animal. It has also been known to scavenge when the opportunity presents itself.

Scolopendra viridicornis is quite quick to flee when disturbed by a predator, running away with impressive speed. If pursued the centipede will raise its terminal legs in an attempt to draw any attack to its hind end. When a predator touches these raised limbs the centipede will use them to grip its aggressor and spin around to deliver a venomous bite. The centipede will then continue to flee until it finds safety.

== Subspecies ==
- Scolopendra viridicornis nigra Bücherl 1941

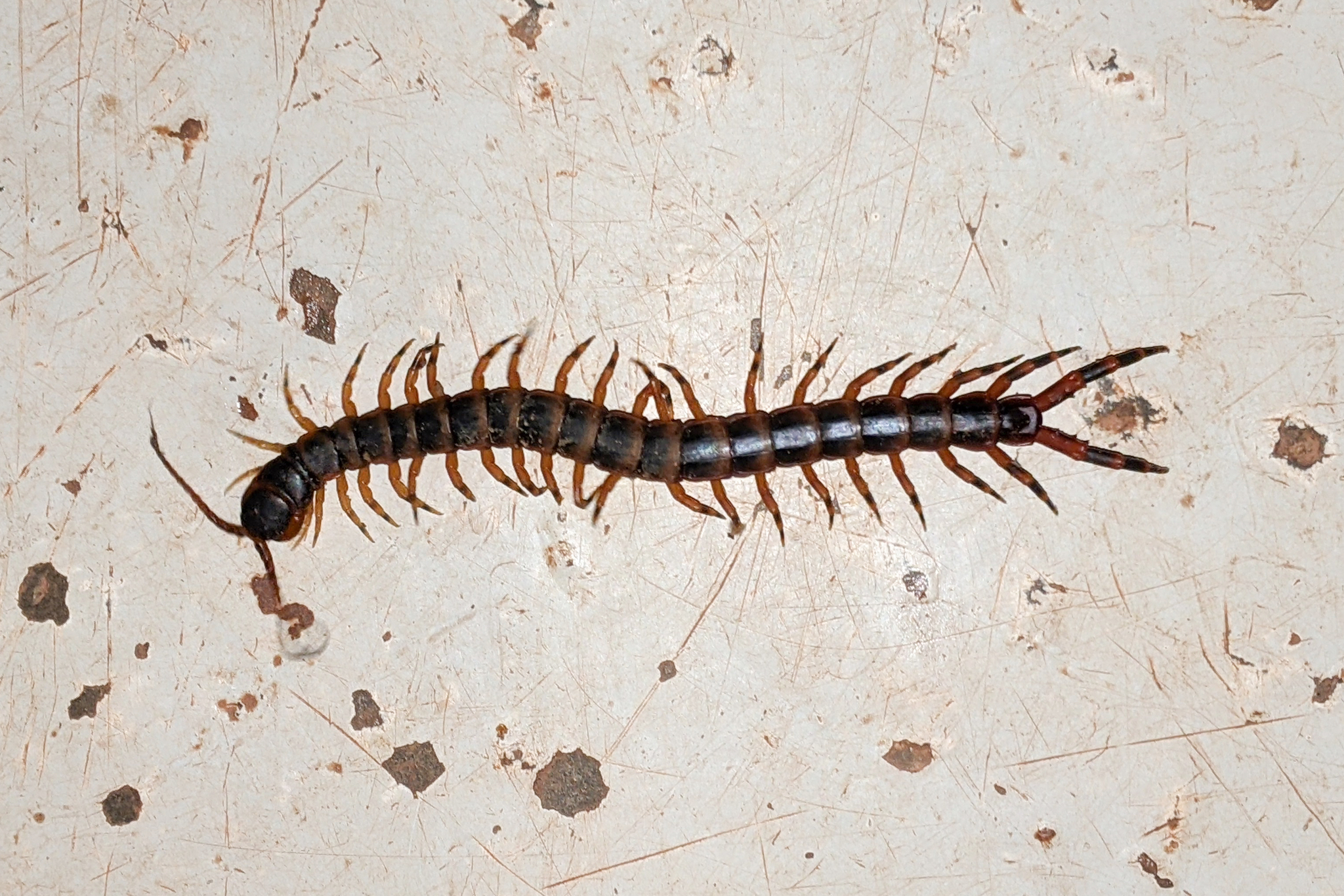
S. v. nigra

- Scolopendra viridicornis viridicornis

== Medical use ==
In northeast Brazil, S. viridicornis is used in regional folk medicine as an analgesic. The species possesses a peptide in its body known as lacrain which exhibits strong antimicrobial effects against Gram-negative bacteria; this peptide is the first described peptide with antimicrobial activity from the body extract of a myriapod. Lacrain shows promise in terms of future uses due to a distinct lack of cytotoxic activity against human erythrocytes.
