= Scolopendra arthrorhabdoides =

Scientific classification
- Kingdom: Animalia
- Phylum: Arthropoda
- Subphylum: Myriapoda
- Class: Chilopoda
- Order: Scolopendromorpha
- Family: Scolopendridae
- Genus: Scolopendra
- Species: S. arthrorhabdoides

Binomial name
- Scolopendra arthrorhabdoides Ribault, 1912

Species of Colombian centipede

Scolopendra arthrorhabdoides is a species of Scolopendrid centipede found in Colombia. It was described in 1912 by Henri Ribaut.

== Appearance ==
Scolopendra arthrorhabdoides is a small species, the type specimen measuring only 45 mm in length. Its maximum length is 59 mm. S. arthrorhabdoides has a green trunk, grey legs, and olive green antennae. Its ultimate legs are dark blue. Its antennae are divided into 17 articles (antennomeres)

== Distribution ==
S. arthrorhabdoides is found only in parts of Colombia between altitudes of 150 and 1550 m. Within its range, it is most common in Meta.

== See also ==
- Arthrorhabdus (genus)
