= Scolopendra crassa =

Scientific classification
- Kingdom: Animalia
- Phylum: Arthropoda
- Subphylum: Myriapoda
- Class: Chilopoda
- Order: Scolopendromorpha
- Family: Scolopendridae
- Genus: Scolopendra
- Species: S. crassa

Binomial name
- Scolopendra crassa Templeton, 1846

Species of centipede

Scolopendra crassa is a species of centipede in the family Scolopendridae. It is endemic to Sri Lanka. The last taxonomic review of the species was done in 1930 by Attems.

Taxon Identification:

ITIS Taxon Serial Number: 1091050

GBIF Taxon ID: :5179621

EOL ID: 309635
