= Scolopendra leki =

Scientific classification
- Kingdom: Animalia
- Phylum: Arthropoda
- Subphylum: Myriapoda
- Class: Chilopoda
- Order: Scolopendromorpha
- Family: Scolopendridae
- Genus: Scolopendra
- Species: S. leki

Binomial name
- Scolopendra leki (Waldock & Edgecombe, 2012)

Synonyms
- Kanparka leki Waldock & Edgecombe 2012

Species of centipede

Scolopendra leki is a species of centipede in the Scolopendridae family. It is endemic to Australia, and was first described in 2012.

== Distribution ==
The species occurs in the Gibson Desert of Western Australia.

== Behaviour ==
The centipedes are solitary terrestrial predators that inhabit plant litter, soil and rotting wood.
