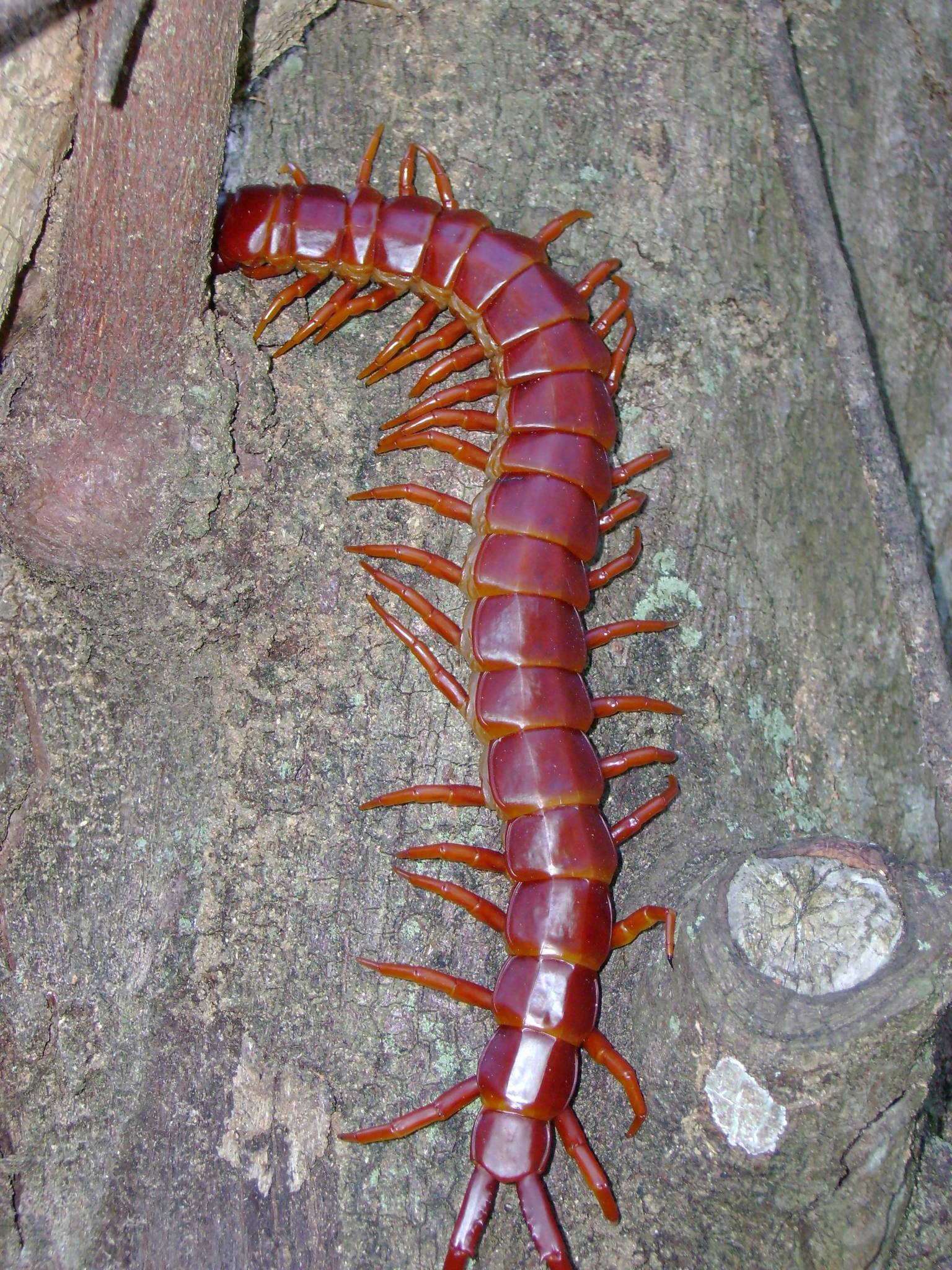

Scientific classification
- Kingdom: Animalia
- Phylum: Arthropoda
- Subphylum: Myriapoda
- Class: Chilopoda
- Order: Scolopendromorpha
- Family: Scolopendridae
- Genus: Scolopendra
- Species: S. alternans

Binomial name
- Scolopendra alternans Leach, 1815 (Note: Sources vary: some say 1813 or 1816.)

Synonyms
- Synonyms: Scolopendra complanata Newport, 1844; Scolopendra crudelis Koch, 1847; Scolopendra grayii Newport, 1844; Scolopendra hirsutipes Bollmann, 1893; Scolopendra incerta Newport, 1845; Scolopendra multispinata Newport, 1844; Scolopendra sagraea Gervais, 1837; Scolopendra testacea Wood, 1861; Scolopendra torquata Wood, 1861

= Scolopendra alternans =

Species of arthropods

Scolopendra alternans, commonly known as the Haitian giant centipede, Caribbean giant centipede, and Florida Keys centipede, (Note: Not to then be confused with Scolopendra longipes, which also goes by that common name since it was resurrected from junior synonymy with S. alternans) is a species of large centipede in the subfamily Scolopendrinae. The species was involved in widespread news coverage after an incident in John Pennekamp Coral Reef State Park, in which a specimen of the extremely rare rim rock crown snake (Tantilla oolitica) died of asphyxiation while trying to eat a Scolopendra alternans, which also died.

== Appearance ==
Scolopendra alternans is a large species of centipede, and can grow up to 17–19 cm in length. Their colouration is generally brownish or reddish, but it varies greatly depending on location. Some American forms are yellow to orange in colour. Morphological features also vary depending on location.

== Distribution ==
This species can be found throughout the Caribbean and northern South America.They have also been reported as far north as Georgia.
