= Scolopendra metuenda =

Scientific classification
- Kingdom: Animalia
- Phylum: Arthropoda
- Subphylum: Myriapoda
- Class: Chilopoda
- Order: Scolopendromorpha
- Family: Scolopendridae
- Genus: Scolopendra
- Species: S. metuenda

Binomial name
- Scolopendra metuenda Pocock, 1895

Species of centipede

Scolopendra metuenda is a species of Scolopendrid centipede found on the Solomon Islands. In the exotic pet trade, it is sometimes known as the Solomon Island Centipede. The species was described by Reginald Innes Pocock in 1895. No further recorded observations have been made of the species; it is believed to be rare, although it has not yet been assessed by the IUCN.

== Appearance ==
Scolopendra metuenda is usually greenish-brown in colour, with the brown dominating at the rear and an almost black head complemented by greener antennae and legs. The antennae are divided into 19 or 20 segments (antennomeres), the first five smooth and later ones slightly hirsute. The head is mostly smooth with some fine punctures, it is also slightly wider than long. The legs are described by Pocock as "long and slender, nearly four times the length of the head."

Scolopendra metuenda is similar to Scolopendra subspinipes, but can be distinguished from the latter by its anal legs and teeth.
