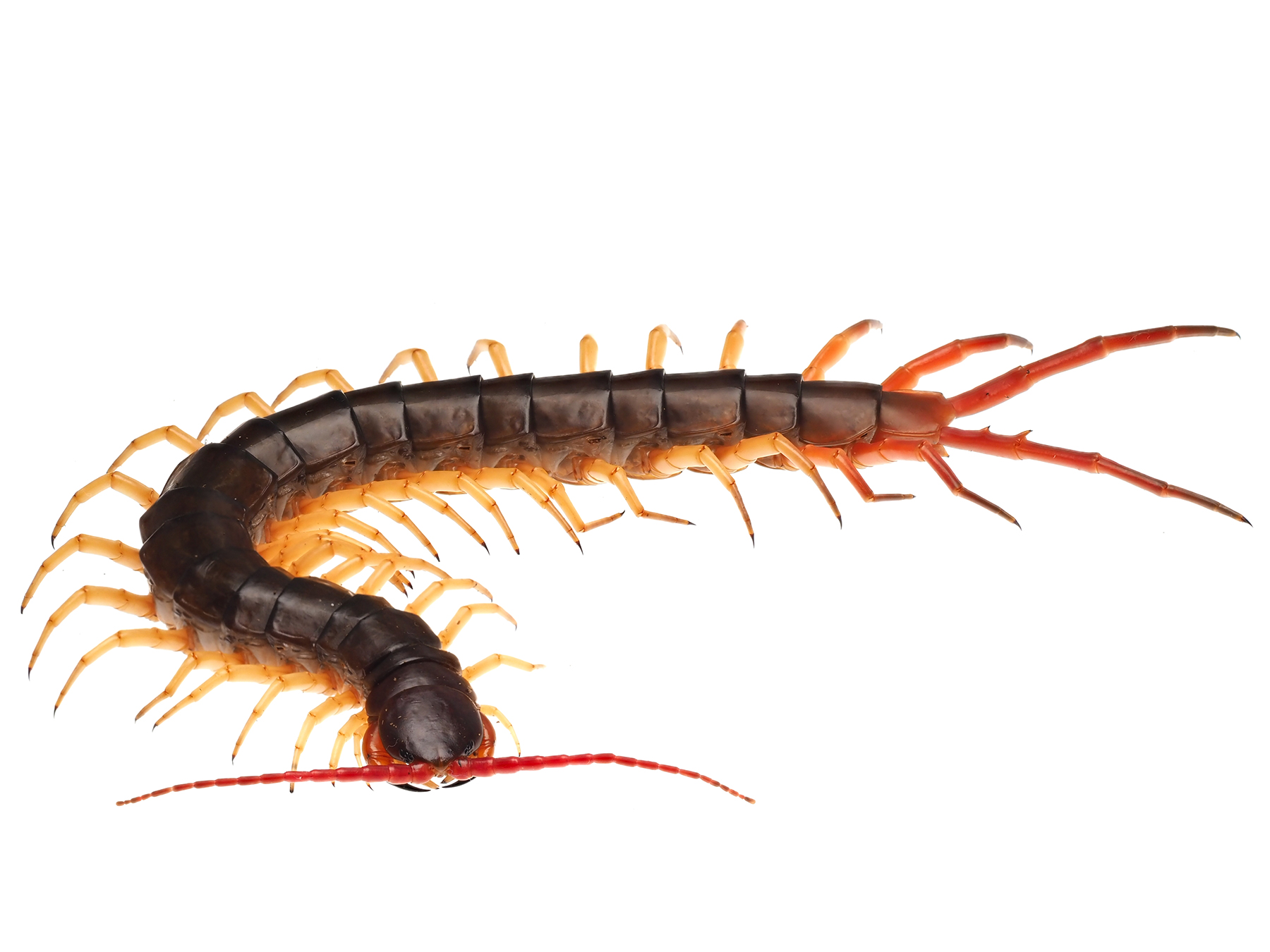

Scientific classification
- Kingdom: Animalia
- Phylum: Arthropoda
- Subphylum: Myriapoda
- Class: Chilopoda
- Order: Scolopendromorpha
- Family: Scolopendridae
- Genus: Scolopendra
- Species: S. dehaani

Binomial name
- Scolopendra dehaani Brandt, 1840
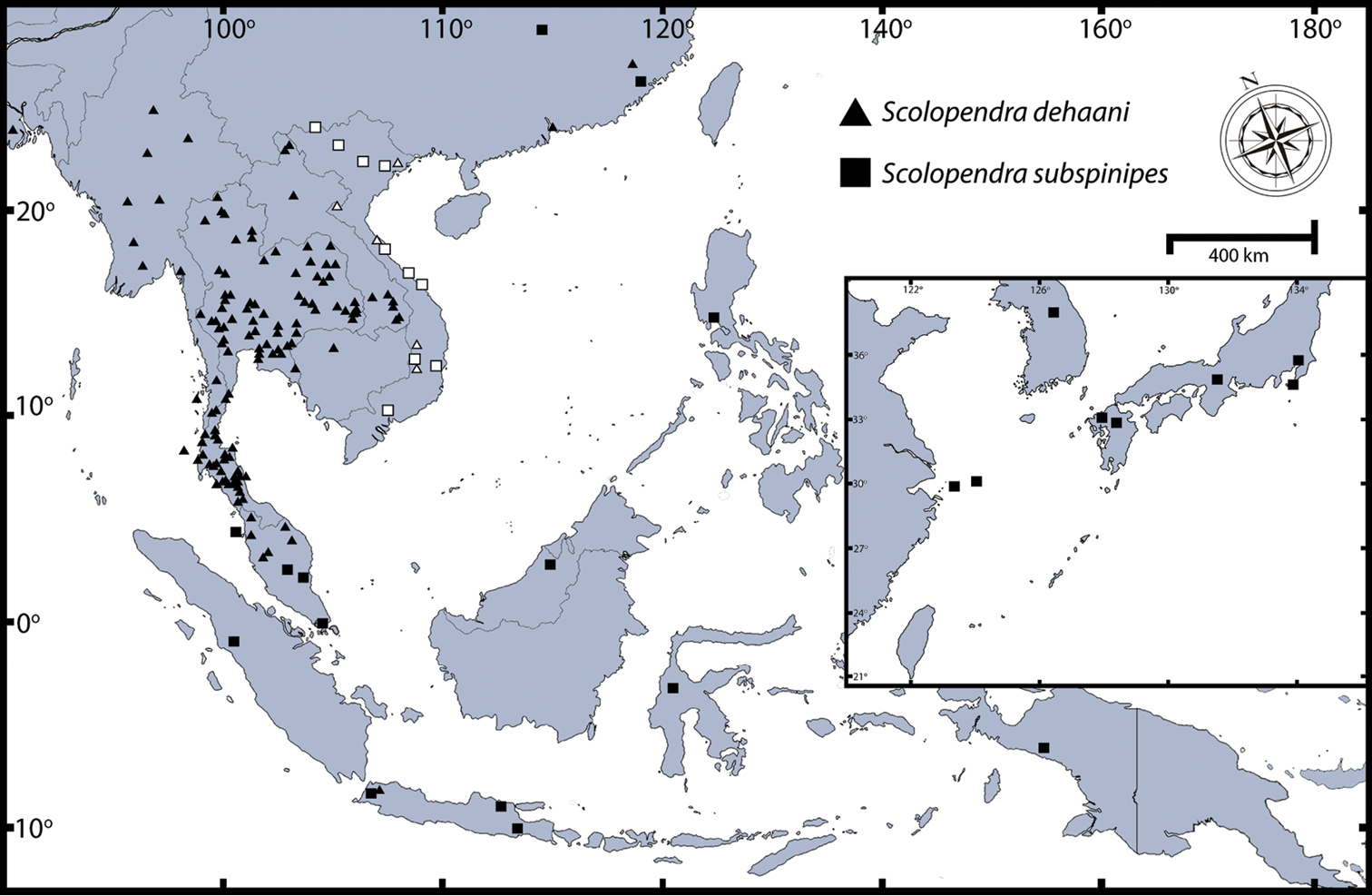

Synonyms
- List: Scolopendra subspinipes dehaani (Attems, 1930); Scolopendra arborea (Lewis, 1982), (Subjective, Siriwut W, Edgecombe GD,et al.(2016); Scolopendra childreni Newport, 1844; Scolopendra concolor Newport, 1845; Scolopendra inermis Newport, 1845; Scolopendra inermipes Koch, 1847; Scolopendra silhetensis Newport, 1845; Scolopendra lucasii Gervais, 1847; Scolopendra horrida Koch, 1847; Scolopendra limicolor Wood, 1861; Scolopendra bispinipes Wood, 1862; Scolopendra fissispina Koch, 1865; Scolopendra nudipes Tömösváry, 1885; Scolopendra foveolata Verhoeff, 1937

= Scolopendra dehaani =

Giant Vietnamese centipede

Species of centipede

Scolopendra dehaani, the giant Vietnamese centipede, is a large scolopendrid centipede found across Mainland Southeast Asia. It is also found in India, Japan, Hong Kong, Borneo, and the Andaman and Nicobar Islands.

== Taxonomy ==
Scolopendra dehaani was originally named by Brandt in 1840, but was reclassified by Carl Attems in 1930 as a subspecies of Scolopendra subspinipes. A 2012 paper reclassified it as a separate species.

== Morphology ==
Scolopendra dehaani is one of the largest centipedes in the genus Scolopendra, and some specimens have been found to reach or exceed 25 cm (9.8 in) in length. It usually lives for five to six years. Specimens usually have brownish-orange tergites (the hard plates on the tops of the segments) and yellow . In a 2016 paper, the authors suggested S. dehaani has five distinct colour morphs: four were dichromatic, one other was monochromatic, and all were generally reddish, brown, or orange in coloration:

#	Head	Segments	Tergites	Antennae	Legs	Pleurites
1	Dark brown	Dark brown	Back border with dark band	Reddish-brown	Chestnut brown	Brownish
2	"Brown or yellowish orange"	"Brown or yellowish orange"	Back border with dark band	Yellowish orange	Dark Brown	Pale Grey
3	Reddish-brown	Reddish-brown	-	Reddish-brown	Yellowish, except 20th and ultimate legs, which are reddish-brown.	Brownish
4	Bright red		Back border with dark band	Yellow or bright orange	Yellowish, except 20th and ultimate legs, which are reddish.	Orange
5	Cherry red	Cherry red	Back border with dark band	Reddish or orange	Reddish	Orange

== Diet ==
Scolopendra dehaani usually preys on smaller arthropods such as insects, spiders, and vinegaroons, but they have been found eating small snakes and other vertebrates, including, in one observation, a tree frog.

One paper suggested that S. dehaani forages arboreally, and it has even been recorded doing so in daytime.

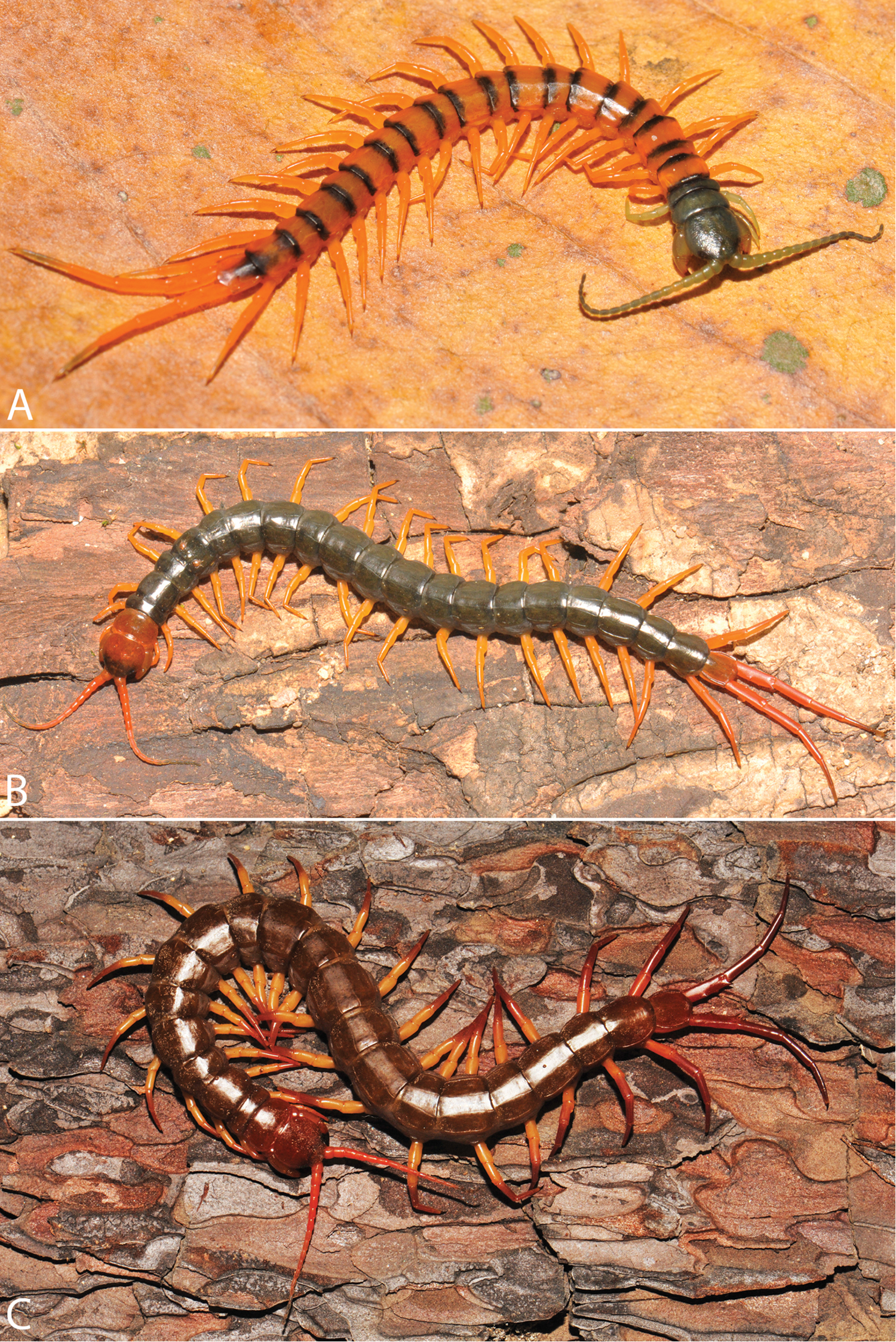
A: Juvenile B: Sub-adult C: Adult

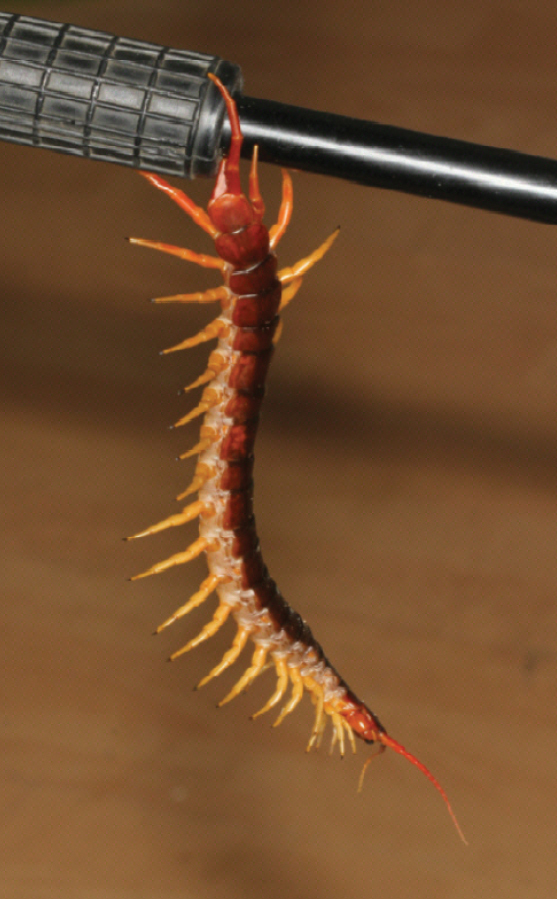

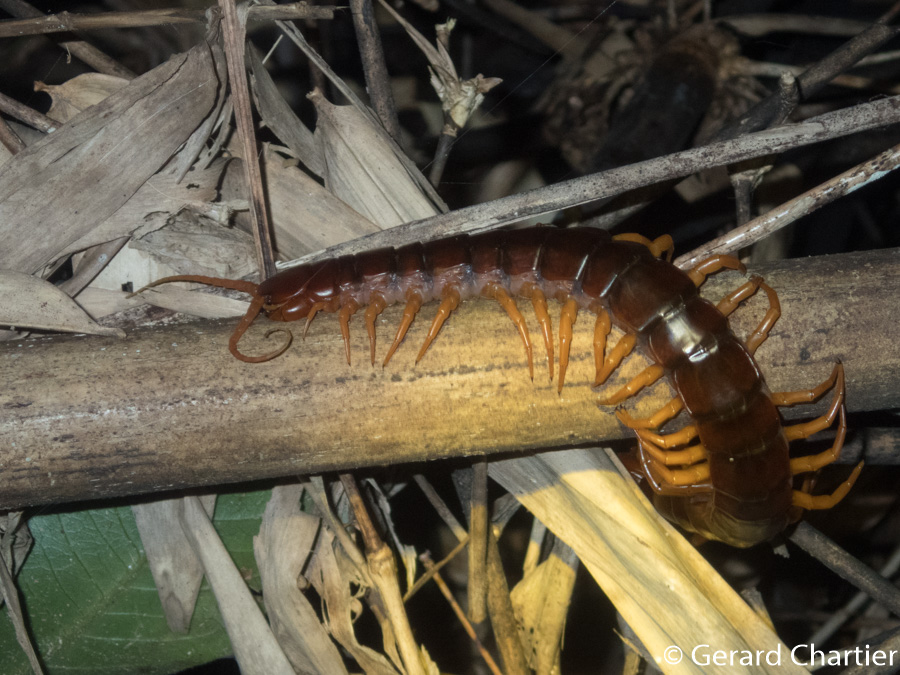

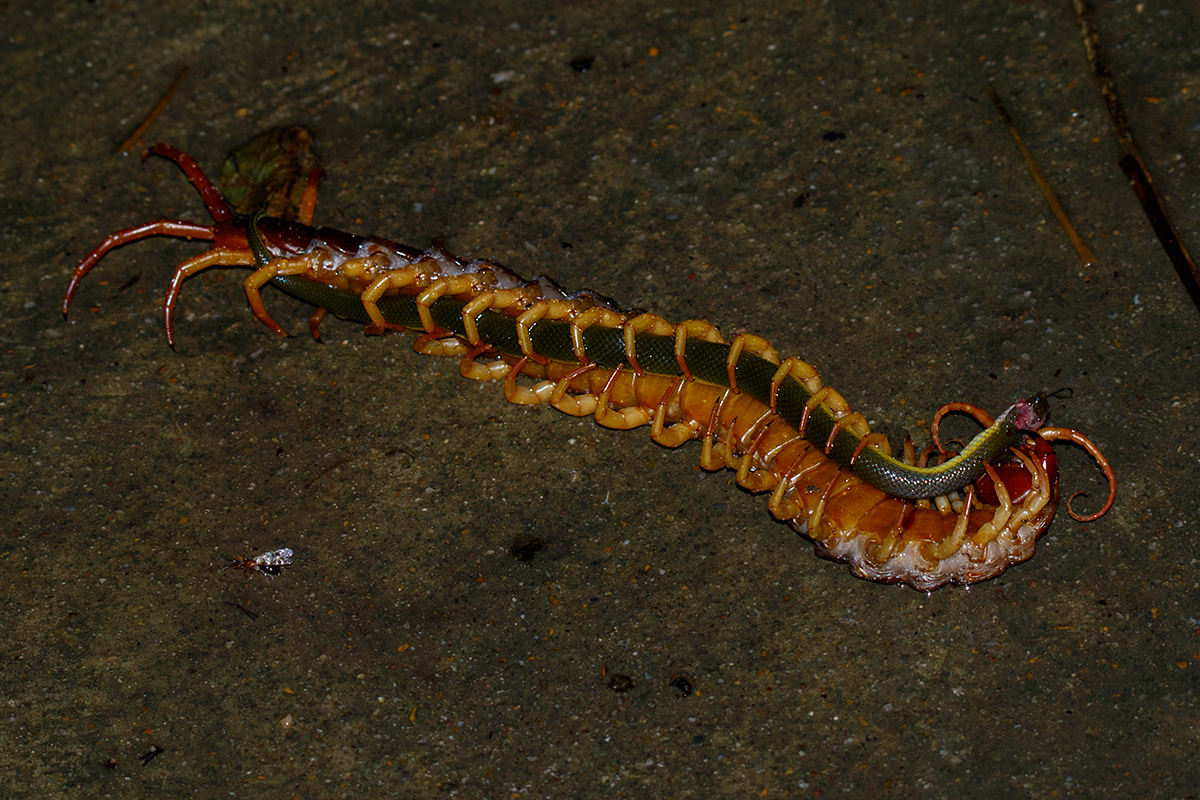
S. dehaani eating a snake of the genus Hypsiscopus.
