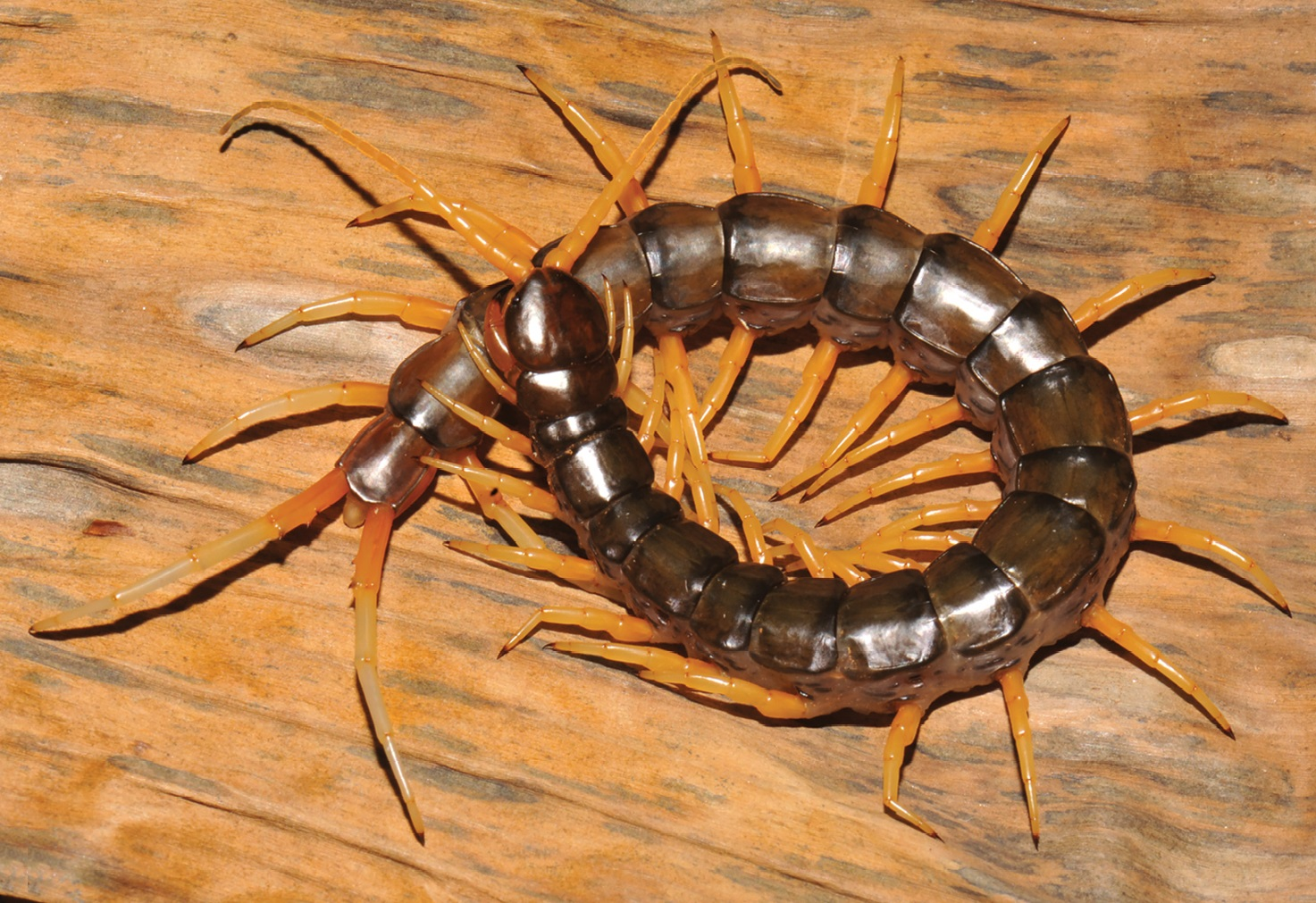

Scientific classification
- Kingdom: Animalia
- Phylum: Arthropoda
- Subphylum: Myriapoda
- Class: Chilopoda
- Order: Scolopendromorpha
- Family: Scolopendridae
- Genus: Scolopendra
- Species: S. cataracta

Binomial name
- Scolopendra cataracta Siriwut, Edgecombe & Panha, 2016

= Scolopendra cataracta =

Species of centipede

Scolopendra cataracta is a species of centipede in the family Scolopendridae. It is the first known amphibious centipede and grows to up to 20 centimetres (7.9 in) in length.

== Description ==
Scolopendra cataracta is a giant centipede, growing to around 200 mm (7.9 in) in length; it has long legs and a greenish-black colour. When exposed, it escapes into water. It both runs along stream beds and swims with eel-like horizontal undulations of its body. Out of water, water rolls off the centipede's body leaving it dry as the surface is hydrophobic. The species was discovered, and the first specimen collected, in 2000 near Thailand's Khao Sok National Park. Two more specimens were collected near waterfalls in Laos. DNA analysis confirmed they belonged to S. cataracta; the new species was named for the Latin for waterfall. A further specimen was found in the Natural History Museum's collection, in the shape of a misidentified 1928 centipede from Vietnam. The ecological niche is conjectured to be based on going "into the water at night to hunt aquatic or amphibious invertebrates." The species description was published in ZooKeys in 2016.

The species is apparently endemic to Southeast Asia, with specimens from Laos, Thailand, and Vietnam.

== Phylogeny and classification ==
The Mainland Asian Scolopendra species are classified into three different main groups. These groups are the pinguis–calcarata group, the subspinipes group, and the morsitans group. The Scolopendra cataracta is classified into the subspinipes group.
