= Scopula calcarata =

Scientific classification
- Kingdom: Animalia
- Phylum: Arthropoda
- Clade: Pancrustacea
- Class: Insecta
- Order: Lepidoptera
- Family: Geometridae
- Genus: Scopula
- Species: S. calcarata

Binomial name
- Scopula calcarata D. S. Fletcher, 1958

Species of geometer moth in subfamily Sterrhinae

Scopula calcarata is a moth of the family Geometridae described by David Stephen Fletcher in 1958. It is found in Malawi, Uganda and Cameroon.
