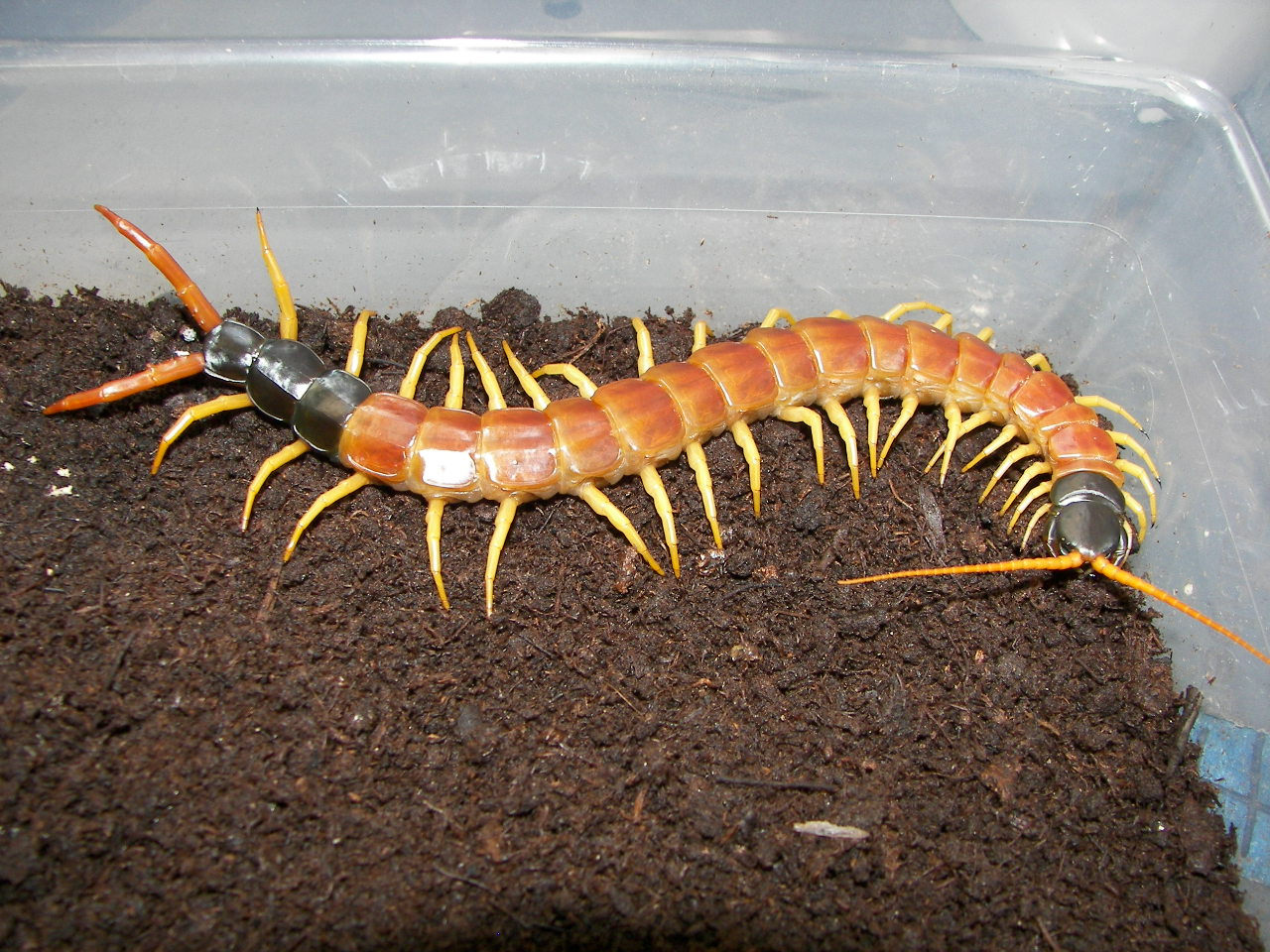

Scientific classification
- Kingdom: Animalia
- Phylum: Arthropoda
- Subphylum: Myriapoda
- Class: Chilopoda
- Order: Scolopendromorpha
- Family: Scolopendridae
- Genus: Scolopendra
- Species: S. heros

Binomial name
- Scolopendra heros Girard, 1853
- Approximate distribution of S. heros

Synonyms
- Scolopendra castaneiceps (Wood, 1861); Scolopendra pernix (Kohlrausch, 1878); Scolopendra heros prismatica (Cragin, 1885); Scolopendra heros arizonensis (Kraepelin, 1903)

= Scolopendra heros =

Species of centipede

Scolopendra heros, commonly known as the Arizona desert centipede, giant desert centipede, giant Sonoran centipede, Texas black-tailed centipede, Texas redheaded centipede, and giant redheaded centipede, is a species of North American centipede found in the Southwestern United States and Northern Mexico.

== Description ==
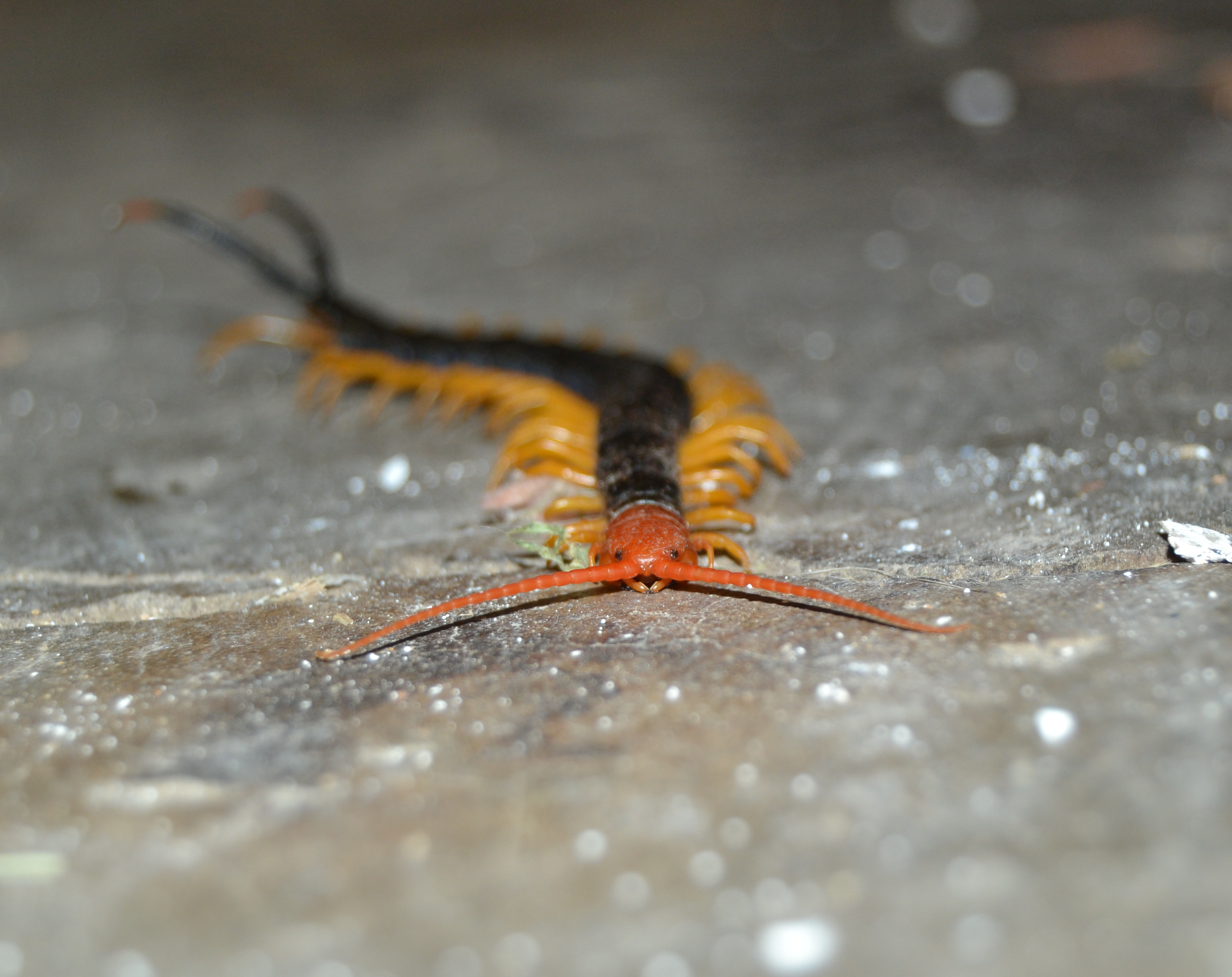
S. heros var. castaneiceps found in Oklahoma, with red head and black body

S. heros is the largest centipede in North America. It has an average length of 6.5 inches (170 mm), but can reach up to 8 in (200 mm) in the wild, and even longer in captivity. Its trunk bears either 21 or 23 pairs of legs.

It is aposematically colored, to warn off potential predators, and a number of color variants are known in the species. The castaneiceps variant found in Arkansas, Missouri, Texas, and other nearby areas is commonly known as the "giant redheaded centipede" or "Texas redheaded centipede" because of its distinct red head and greenish black body and tail.

== Distribution and ecology ==
S. heros is found in northern Mexico and the southwestern United States, from New Mexico and Arizona in the west to Arkansas, Missouri, and Louisiana in the east. Although this species is commonly referred to as the "giant desert centipede" because of its presence in the Sonoran and Chihuahuan Deserts, and other arid and semi-arid habitats, S. heros is also found in rocky woodland areas, such as in Arkansas. It remains underground on warm days, emerging in cloudy weather.

== Hunting and diet ==
S. heros is primarily a nocturnal predator and hunts invertebrates and small vertebrates, including rodents, reptiles, and amphibians. It is capable of reaching into the air to grab small flying insects. The centipede uses its venom to subdue prey.

== Life cycle ==
S. heros hatch from eggs. As they grow and mature, like all arthropods they shed and molt away their exoskeleton. Each time they molt they enter a new stage of its life cycle called an instar. Like all Scolopendromorph centipedes, the number of segments they possess remains the same throughout their life. S. heros is a slow-growing species capable of living over a decade.

== Venom ==
The venom of S. heros is similar in composition to the venom of other Scolopendra species, including components such as serotonin, histamine, lipids, proteins (including cardiotoxic proteins and enzymes such as hemolytic phospholipase A), and other substances. The mixture is known to act as a cytolysin, compromising cellular membranes and rupturing cells. S. heros venom also contains toxins targeted to its prey: one toxin numbs the nervous system of insects, rendering them unable to sense or escape, while another toxin interferes with the autonomic nervous system of vertebrates to make small vertebrates easier to subdue and devour. The exact effects and makeup of the venom have not been thoroughly evaluated, in part because it is difficult to extract in significant quantities and quickly deteriorates when processed.

S. heros bites are very painful to vertebrates. A rat bitten by S. heros in the leg showed signs of excruciating pain, followed by soreness, but returned to normal after five hours. For humans, a bite from S. heros usually causes sharp, searing, local pain and swelling, but has never caused any confirmed deaths. S. heros bites are known to occasionally cause nausea, headache, and localized skin necrosis. However, there are individual cases of severe symptoms and injury (including kidney failure due to rhabdomyolysis, and heart attack) in humans resulting from Scolopendra bites.
