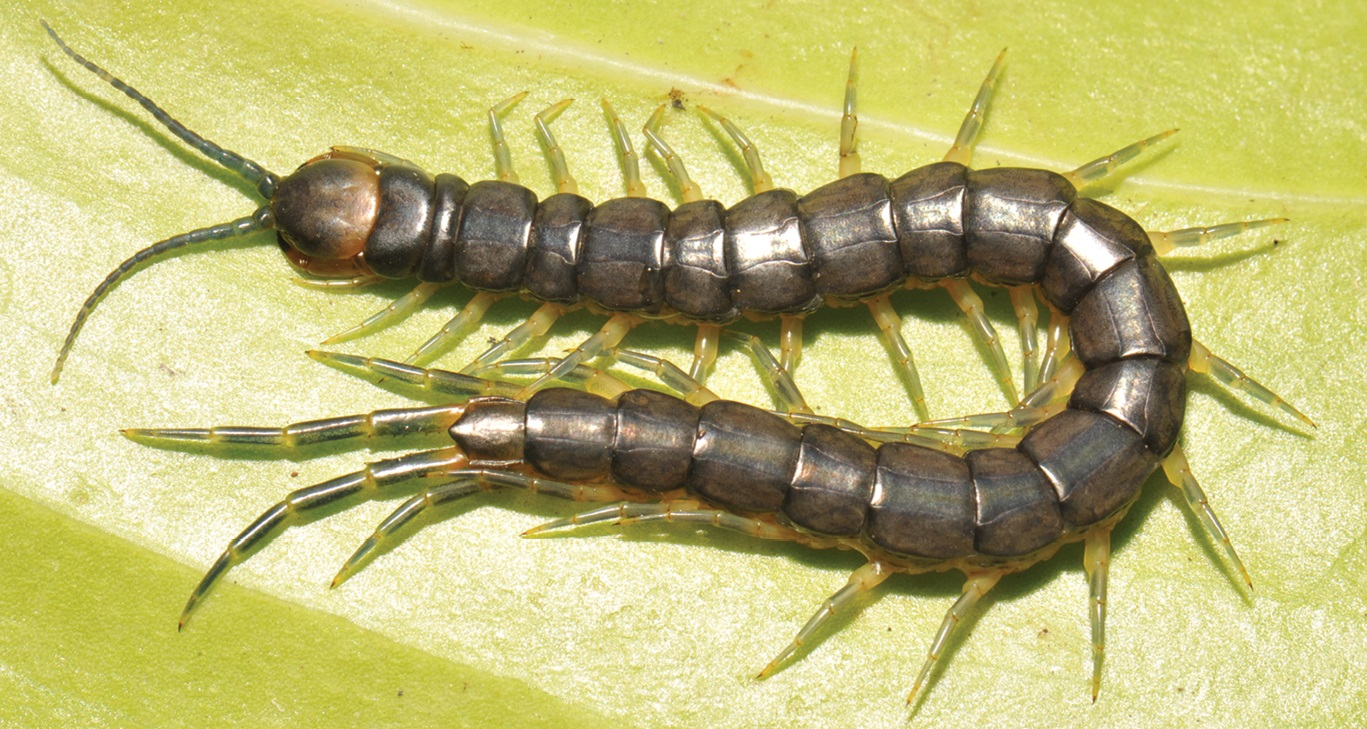

Scientific classification
- Domain: Eukaryota
- Kingdom: Animalia
- Phylum: Arthropoda
- Subphylum: Myriapoda
- Class: Chilopoda
- Order: Scolopendromorpha
- Family: Scolopendridae
- Genus: Scolopendra
- Species: S. calcarata

Binomial name
- Scolopendra calcarata Porat, 1876

= Scolopendra calcarata =

Species of centipede

Scolopendra calcarata is a species of centipede in the family Scolopendridae discovered in 1876.
