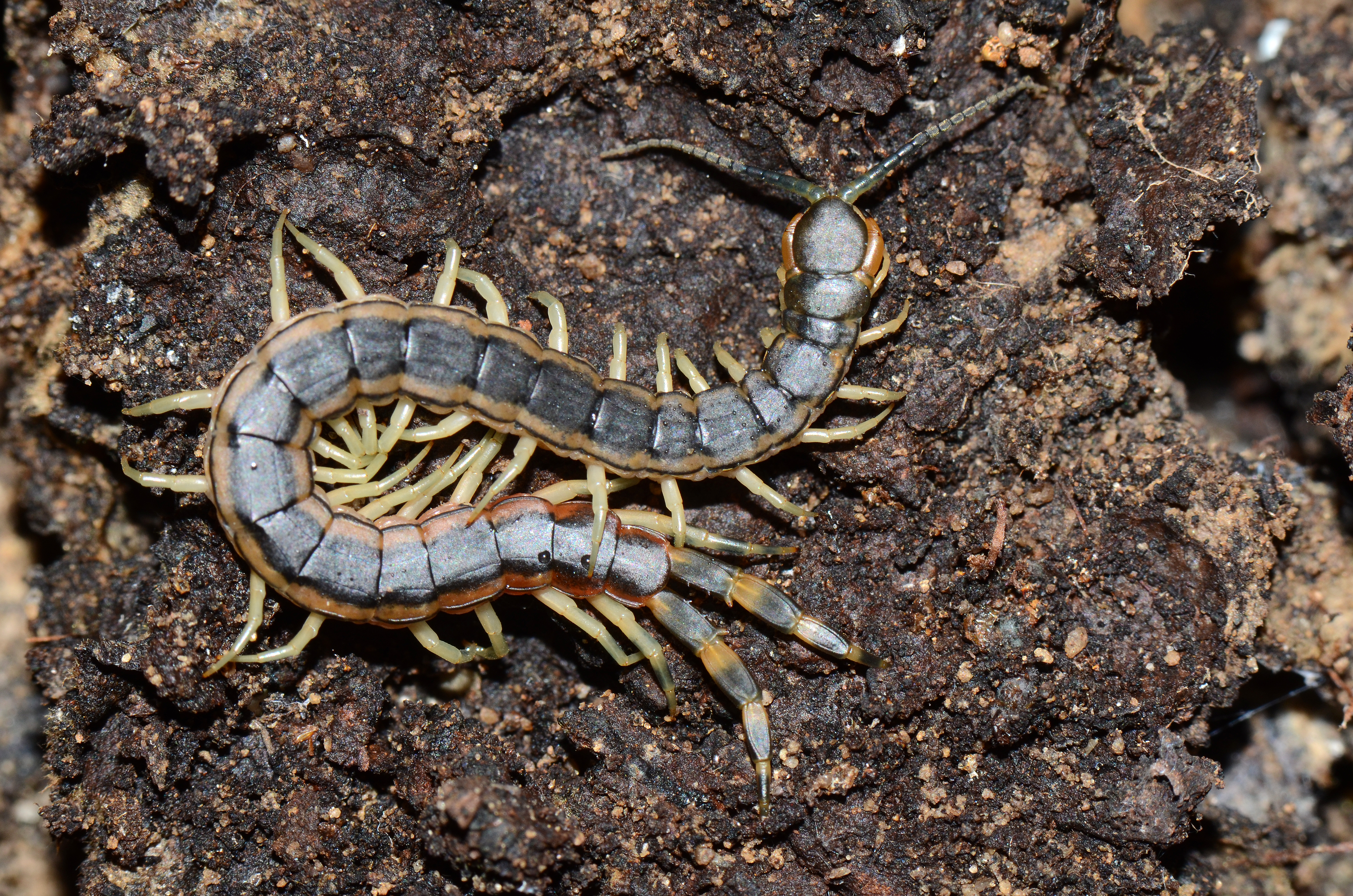

Scientific classification
- Kingdom: Animalia
- Phylum: Arthropoda
- Subphylum: Myriapoda
- Class: Chilopoda
- Order: Scolopendromorpha
- Family: Scolopendridae
- Genus: Scolopendra
- Species: S. laeta

Binomial name
- Scolopendra laeta Haase, 1887

Synonyms
- Scolopendra laeta flavipes Kraepelin, 1908; Scolopendra laeta viridis Kraepelin, 1908; Scolopendra laeta fasciata Kraepelin, 1908

= Scolopendra laeta =

Species of centipede

Scolopendra laeta is a species of centipede in the Scolopendridae family. It is endemic to Australia, and was first described in 1887 by German entomologist Erich Haase.

== Distribution ==
The species has a wide range across mainland Australia.

== Behaviour ==
The centipedes are solitary terrestrial predators that inhabit plant litter, soil and rotting wood.
