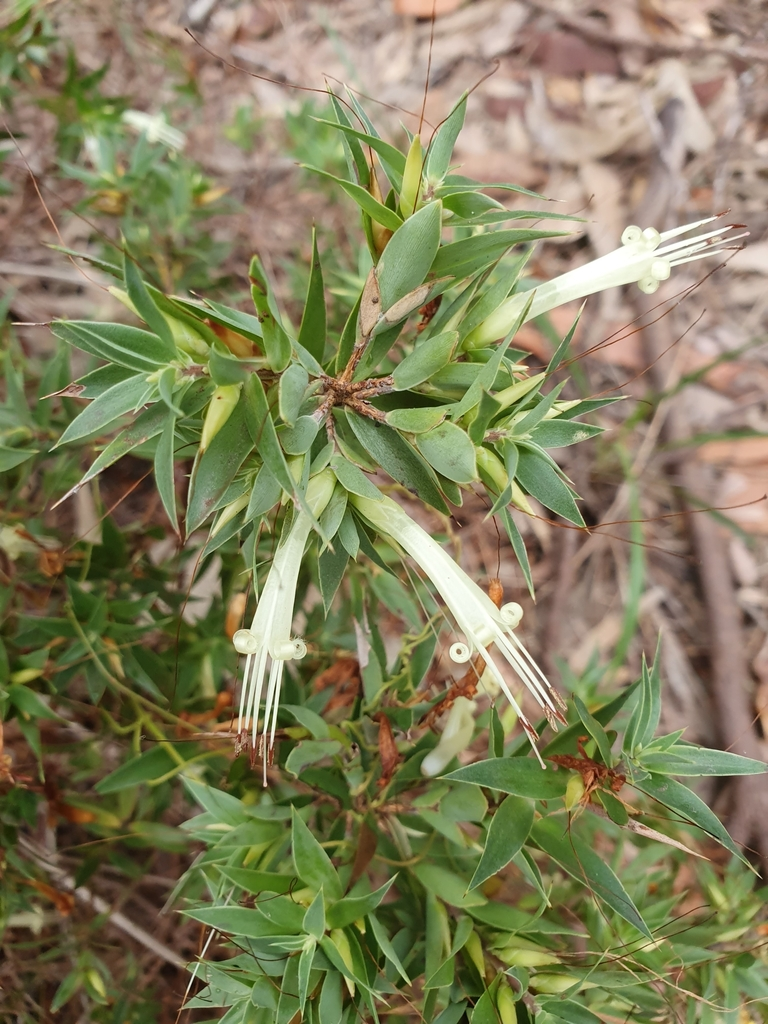
- In Oatley Park

Scientific classification
- Kingdom: Plantae
- Clade: Tracheophytes
- Clade: Angiosperms
- Clade: Eudicots
- Clade: Asterids
- Order: Ericales
- Family: Ericaceae
- Genus: Styphelia
- Species: S. laeta

Binomial name
- Styphelia laeta R.Br.

= Styphelia laeta =

Species of plant

Styphelia laeta, commonly known as five corners, is a species of flowering plant in the heath family Ericaceae and is endemic to New South Wales. It is a slender, erect shrub with broadly elliptic or egg-shaped leaves and pale yellowish-green or red flowers arranged singly in leaf axils.

== Description ==
Styphelia laeta is a slender, erect shrub that typically grows to a height of 1–2 m (3 ft 3 in – 6 ft 7 in), its branchlets covered with velvety hairs. The leaves are broadly elliptic or egg-shaped, 13–35 mm (0.51–1.38 in) long, 6.0–13.5 mm (0.24–0.53 in) wide on a petiole 0.4–1.6 mm (0.016–0.063 in) long. The flowers are arranged singly in leaf axils with glabrous bracteoles 2.8–5.4 mm (0.11–0.21 in) long. The flowers are pale yellowish-green or red, the sepals 7–13.5 mm (0.28–0.53 in) long and the petals form a tube 14.5–26 mm (0.57–1.02 in) long with densely hairy lobes 13–21 mm (0.51–0.83 in) long. The stamen filaments are 8.6–15 mm (0.34–0.59 in) long. Flowering occurs from February to August and the fruit is 6.6–8.3 mm (0.26–0.33 in) long.

== Taxonomy ==
Styphelia laeta was first formally described in 1810 by botanist Robert Brown in his Prodromus Florae Novae Hollandiae. The specific epithet (laeta) means "cheerful", "pleasant" or "bright".

In 1992, Jocelyn Powell described two subspecies of S. laeta in the journal Telopea and the names are accepted by the Australian Plant Census:

- Styphelia laeta R.Br. subsp. laeta has leaves with a length:breadth ratio of 2.5–6.3:1 and finely toothed edges.
- Styphelia laeta subsp. latifolia (R.Br.) J.M.Powell has leaves with a length:breadth ratio of 1.9–3.1:1 and finely softly-hairy edges.

== Distribution and habitat ==
Five corners grows in forest or shrubland between Gosford, Sydney and the Blue Mountains and disjunctly near Warialda.
