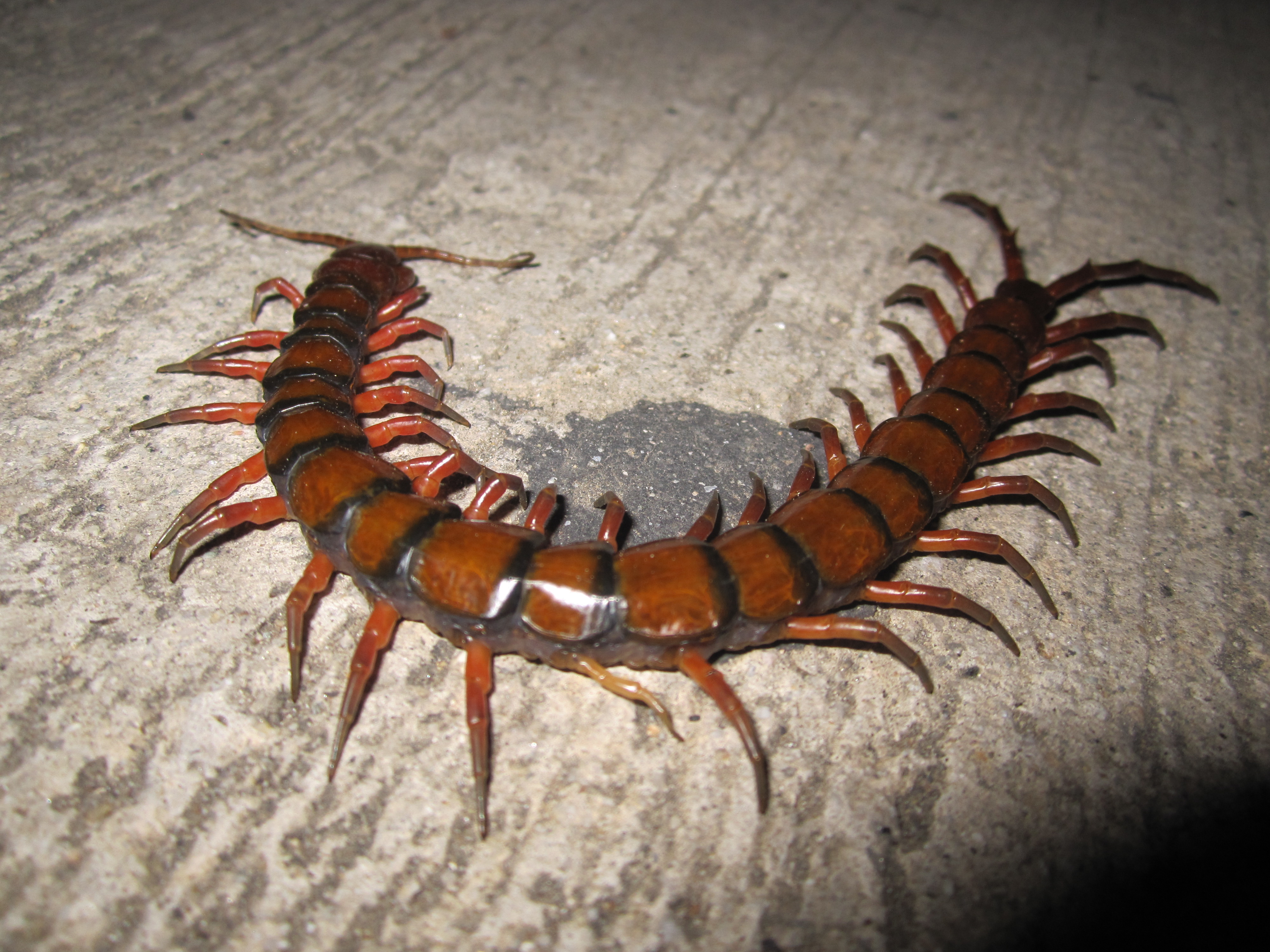

Scientific classification
- Kingdom: Animalia
- Phylum: Arthropoda
- Subphylum: Myriapoda
- Class: Chilopoda
- Order: Scolopendromorpha
- Family: Scolopendridae
- Genus: Scolopendra
- Species: S. gigantea

Binomial name
- Scolopendra gigantea Linnaeus, 1758

= Scolopendra gigantea =

Scolopendra gigantea Temporal range: Pleistocene–recent

Species of Chilopoda (centipede)

Scolopendra gigantea, also known as the Peruvian giant yellow-leg centipede or Amazonian giant centipede, is a centipede in the genus Scolopendra. It is the largest centipede species in the world, with a length exceeding 30 centimetres (12 in). Specimens may have 21 or 23 segments. It is found in various places throughout South America and the extreme south Caribbean, where it preys on a wide variety of animals, including other sizable arthropods, amphibians, mammals and reptiles.

== Distribution and habitat ==
It is naturally found in northern South America. Countries from which verified museum specimens have been collected include Aruba, Brazil, Curaçao, Colombia, Venezuela (including Margarita Island) and Trinidad. Records from Saint Thomas, U.S. Virgin Islands, Hispaniola (both Haiti and the Dominican Republic), Mexico, Puerto Rico and Honduras are assumed to be accidental introductions or labelling errors.

Scolopendra gigantea can be found in tropical or sub-tropical rainforest and tropical dry forest, in dark, moist places such as in leaf litter or under rocks and logs. They climb readily and will utilize hiding spaces under bark in trees. When human-built structures occur near to their natural habitat, these centipedes will often forage and/or seek refuge in trash piles, rubble, plant pots, crawl spaces under buildings, beneath old floor and ceiling boards, and crevices in wooden, concrete and brick walls.

== Behavior and diet ==
Scolopendra gigantea is a carnivore that feeds on any other animal it can overpower and kill. It is capable of overpowering not only other invertebrates such as large insects, worms, snails, spiders, millipedes, scorpions, and even tarantulas, but also small vertebrates including small lizards, frogs (up to 9.5 centimetres [3 3/4 in] long), snakes (up to 25 centimetres [10 in] long), sparrow-sized birds, mice, and bats. Large individuals of S. gigantea have been known to employ unique strategies to catch bats with muscular strength. They climb cave ceilings and hold or manipulate their heavier prey with only a few legs attached to the ceiling.

Natural predators to the giant centipedes include large birds, spiders and arthropod-hunting mammals, including the coati, kinkajou, and opossum.

== Venom ==
The venom from S. gigantea is potent enough to immobilize small mammals that it preys upon, such as bats and mice. This venom is secreted from a modified leg pair underneath the head.

At least one human death has been attributed to the venom of S. gigantea. In 2014, a four-year-old child in Venezuela died after being bitten by a giant centipede which was hidden inside an open soda can. Researchers at Universidad de Oriente later confirmed the specimen to be S. gigantea.
