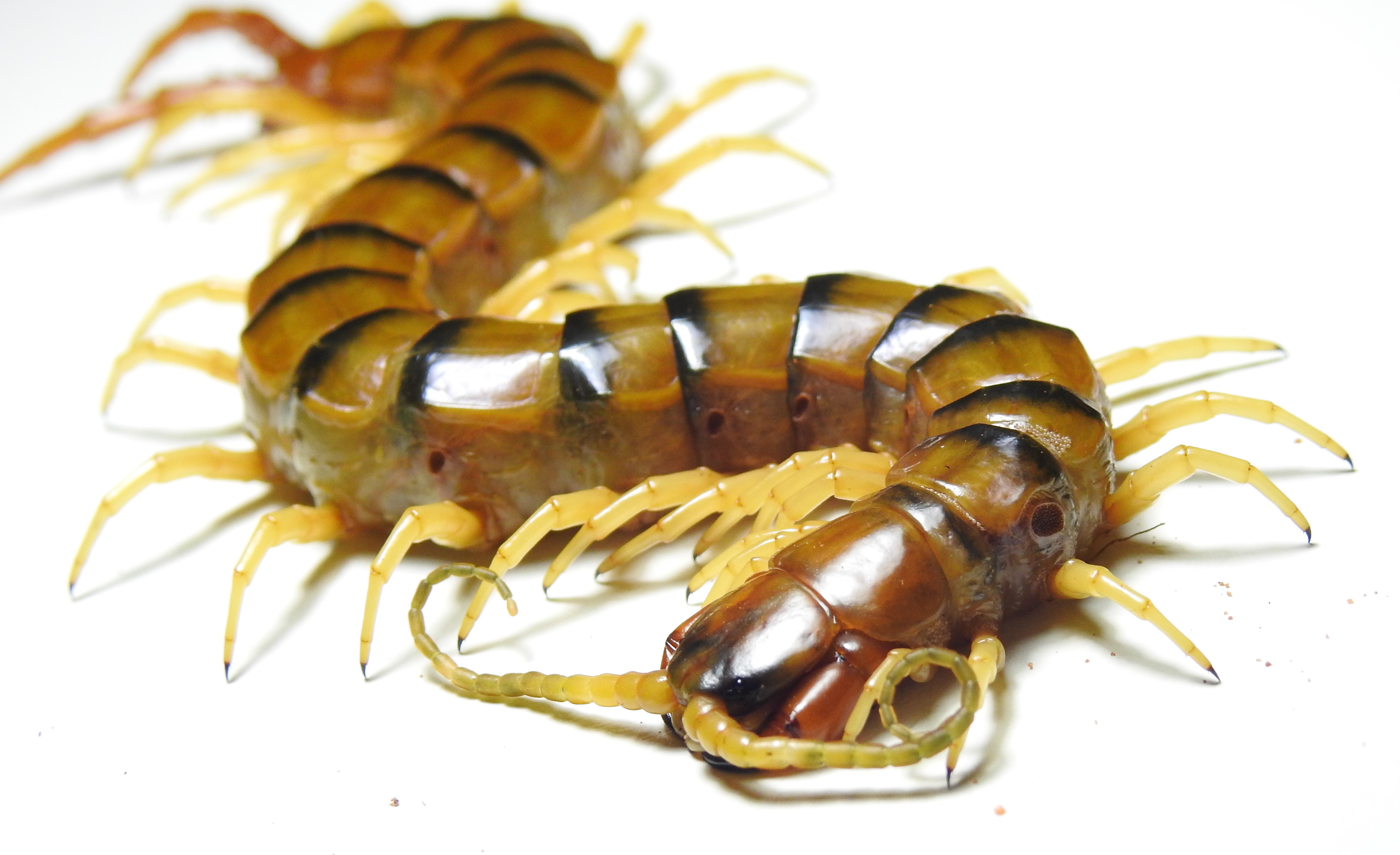
- Ethmostigmus rubripes

Scientific classification
- Kingdom: Animalia
- Phylum: Arthropoda
- Subphylum: Myriapoda
- Class: Chilopoda
- Order: Scolopendromorpha
- Family: Scolopendridae
- Subfamily: Otostigminae; Kraepelin, 1903

Type genus
- Otostigmus Porat, 1876

Genera
- Alipes Imhoff, 1854; Alluropus Silvestri, 1911; Digitipes Attems, 1930; Edentistoma Tömösváry, 1882; Ethmostigmus Pocock, 1898; Otostigmus Porat, 1876; Rhysida Wood, 1862; Sterropristes Attems, 1934

= Otostigminae =

Subfamily of centipedes

Otostigminae is a large subfamily of centipedes, containing nearly half of all species in the family Scolopendridae. Members of this subfamily are abundant and widespread throughout the tropical and subtropical regions of the world, mostly in Africa, Asia (particularly Southeast Asia and the Indian subcontinent), and Australia. The type genus Otostigmus is the most speciose within the subfamily.

== Classification ==
This subfamily includes the following genera and species:

- Alipes Imhoff, 1854

- A. appendiculatus Pocock, 1896
- A. calcipes Cook, 1897
- A. crotalus (Gerstaecker, 1854)
- A. grandidieri Lucas, 1864
- A. madecassus Saussure & Zehntner, 1902
- A. multicostis Imhoff, 1854

- Alluropus Silvestri, 1911

- A. demangei Silvestri, 1912

- Digitipes Attems, 1930

- D. barnabasi Jangi & Dass, 1984
- D. chhotanii Jangi & Dass, 1984
- D. coonoorensis Jangi & Dass, 1984
- D. jangii Joshi & Edgecombe, 2013
- D. jonesii (Verhoeff, 1938)
- D. kalewaensis Siriwut, Edgecombe & Panha, 2015
- D. krausi Dobroruka, 1968
- D. periyarensis Joshi & Edgecombe, 2013
- D. pruthii Jangi & Dass, 1984
- D. reichardti (Kraepelin, 1903)
- D. verdascens Attems, 1930

- Edentistoma Tömösváry, 1882

- E. octosulcatum Tömösváry, 1882

- Ethmostigmus Pocock, 1898

- E. agasthyamalaiensis Joshi & Edgecombe, 2018
- E. albidus (Tömösváry, 1885)
- E. brownii (Butler, 1877)
- E. californicus Chamberlin, 1958
- E. coonooranus Chamberlin, 1920
- E. curtipes Koch, 1983
- E. granulosus Pocock 1898
- E. muiri Koch, 1983
- E. nuidor Koch, 1983
- E. pachysoma Koch, 1983
- E. parkeri Koch, 1983
- E. praveeni Joshi & Edgecombe, 2018
- E. pygomegas (Kohlrausch, 1878)
- E. relictus Chamberlin, 1944
- E. rubripes (Brandt, 1840)
- E. rugosus (Haase, 1887)
- E. sahyadrensis Joshi & Edgecombe, 2018
- E. trigonopodus (Leach, 1817)
- E. tristis (Meinert, 1886)
- E. venenosus (Attems, 1897)
- E. waiainus Chamberlin, 1920

- Otostigmus Porat, 1876

- O. aculeatus Haase, 1887
- O. amazonae Chamberlin, 1914
- O. amballae Chamberlin, 1913
- O. angusticeps Pocock, 1898
- O. armatus Attems, 1953
- O. asper Haase, 1887
- O. astenus (Kohlrausch, 1878)
- O. ateles Chamberlin, 1920
- O. australianus Attems, 1930
- O. beckeri Chagas Jr., 2012
- O. beroni Lewis, 2001
- O. brevidentatus Verhoeff, 1937
- O. bürgeri Attems, 1903
- O. burnmurdochi Gravely, 1912
- O. calcanus Chamberlin, 1944
- O. caraibicus Kraepelin, 1903
- O. carbonelli Bücherl, 1939
- O. caudatus Brölemann, 1902
- O. cavalcanti Bücherl, 1939
- O. celebensis Attems, 1934
- O. ceylonicus Haase, 1887
- O. chiltoni Archey, 1921
- O. clavifer Chamberlin, 1921
- O. cooperi Chamberlin, 1942
- O. cuneiventris Porat, 1893
- O. dammermani Chamberlin, 1944
- O. demelloi Verhoeff, 1937
- O. denticulatus (Pocock, 1896)
- O. diringshofeni Bücherl, 1969
- O. dolosus Attems, 1928
- O. expectus Bücherl, 1959
- O. feae Pocock, 1891
- O. fossuliger Verhoeff, 1937
- O. foveolatus Verhoeff, 1937
- O. füellerborni Kraepelin, 1903
- O. gemmifer Attems, 1928
- O. geophilinus Haase, 1887
- O. giupponii Chagas Jr., 2012
- O. goeldii Brölemann, 1898
- O. gravelyi (Jangi & Dass, 1984)
- O. gymnopus Silvestri, 1898
- O. inermipes Porat, 1893
- O. inermis Porat, 1876
- O. insignis Kraepelin, 1903
- O. kashmiranus Lewis, 1992
- O. kervillei Karsch, 1888
- O. kivuensis (Dobroruka, 1968)
- O. lanceolatus Chagas Jr., 2012
- O. lavanus Chamberlin, 1957
- O. lawrencei Dobroruka, 1968
- O. leior Chamberlin, 1955
- O. limbatus Meinert, 1886
- O. longicornis (Tömösväry, 1885)
- O. loriae Silvestri, 1894
- O. martensi Lewis, 1992
- O. mesethus Chamberlin, 1957
- O. metallicus Haase, 1887
- O. mians Chamberlin, 1930
- O. multidens Haase, 1887
- O. muticus Karsch, 1888
- O. nemorensis Silvestri, 1895
- O. niasensis Silvestri, 1895
- O. noduliger Verhoeff, 1937
- O. nudus Pocock, 1890
- O. oatesi Kraepelin, 1903
- O. occidentalis Meinert, 1886
- O. olivaceus Attems, 1934
- O. orientalis Porat, 1876
- O. pahangiensis Verhoeff, 1937
- O. pamuanus Chamberlin, 1920
- O. parvior Chamberlin, 1957
- O. pococki Kraepelin, 1903
- O. politus Karsch, 1881
- O. poonamae Khanna & Tripathi, 1986
- O. productus Karsch, 1884
- O. proponens Chamberlin, 1920
- O. punctiventer (Tömösväry, 1885)
- O. reservatus Schileyko, 1995
- O. rex Chamberlin, 1914
- O. rugulosus Porat, 1876
- O. saltensis Coscarón, 1959
- O. salticus Schileyko, Iorio & Coulis, 2018
- O. samacus Chamberlin, 1944
- O. scaber Porat, 1876
- O. scabricauda (Humbert & Saussure, 1870)
- O. schoutedeni (Dobroruka, 1968)
- O. seychellarum Attems, 1900
- O. silvestrii Kraepelin, 1903
- O. sinicolens Chamberlin, 1930
- O. spiculifer Pocock, 1893
- O. spinicaudus (Newport, 1844)
- O. spinosus Porat, 1876
- O. striolatus Verhoeff, 1937
- O. sucki Kraepelin, 1903
- O. suitus Chamberlin, 1914
- O. sulcatus Meinert, 1886
- O. sulcipes Verhoeff, 1937
- O. sumatranus Haase, 1887
- O. sutteri Würmli, 1972
- O. taeniatus Pocock, 1896
- O. tanganjikus Verhoeff, 1941
- O. telus Chamberlin, 1939
- O. therezopolis Chamberlin, 1944
- O. tibialis Brölemann, 1902
- O. tidius Chamberlin, 1914
- O. trisulcatus Verhoeff, 1937
- O. troglodytes Ribaut, 1914
- O. tuberculatus (Kohlrausch, 1878)
- O. volcanus Chamberlin, 1955
- O. voprosus Schileyko, 1992

- Rhysida Wood, 1862

- R. afra (Peters, 1855)
- R. anodonta Lawrence, 1968
- R. brasiliensis Kraepelin, 1903
- R. calcarata Pocock, 1891
- R. carinulata (Haase, 1887)
- R. celeris (Humbert & Saussure, 1870)
- R. ceylonica Gravely, 1912
- R. chacona Verhoeff, 1944
- R. corbetti Khanna, 1994
- R. crassispina Kraepelin, 1903
- R. ikhamala Joshi, Karanth & Edgecombe, 2019
- R. immarginata (Porat, 1876)
- R. intermedia Attems, 1910
- R. jonesi Lewis, 2002
- R. konda Joshi, Karanth & Edgecombe, 2019
- R. leviventer Attems, 1953
- R. lewisi Joshi, Karanth & Edgecombe, 2019
- R. lithobioides (Newport, 1845)
- R. longicarinulata Khanna & Tripathi, 1986
- R. longicornis Pocock, 1891
- R. longipes (Newport, 1845)
- R. manchurica Miyoshi, 1939
- R. marginata Attems, 1953
- R. monalii Khanna & Kumar, 1984
- R. monaquensis González-Sponga, 2002
- R. monticola (Pocock, 1891)
- R. neocrassispina Jangi & Dass, 1984
- R. nuda (Newport, 1845)
- R. pazhuthara Joshi, Karanth & Edgecombe, 2019
- R. polycantha Koch, 1985
- R. riograndensis Bücherl, 1939
- R. rubra Bücherl, 1939
- R. sada Joshi, Karanth & Edgecombe, 2019
- R. singaporiensis Verhoeff, 1937
- R. stuhlmanni Kraepelin, 1903
- R. suvana Chamberlin, 1920
- R. trispinosa Jangi & Dass, 1984
- R. ventrisulcus Attems, 1930

- Sterropristes Attems, 1934

- S. sarasinorum Attems, 1934
- S. violaceus Muadsub, Sutcharit, Pimvichai, Enghoff, Edgecombe & Panha, 2012

== Gallery ==
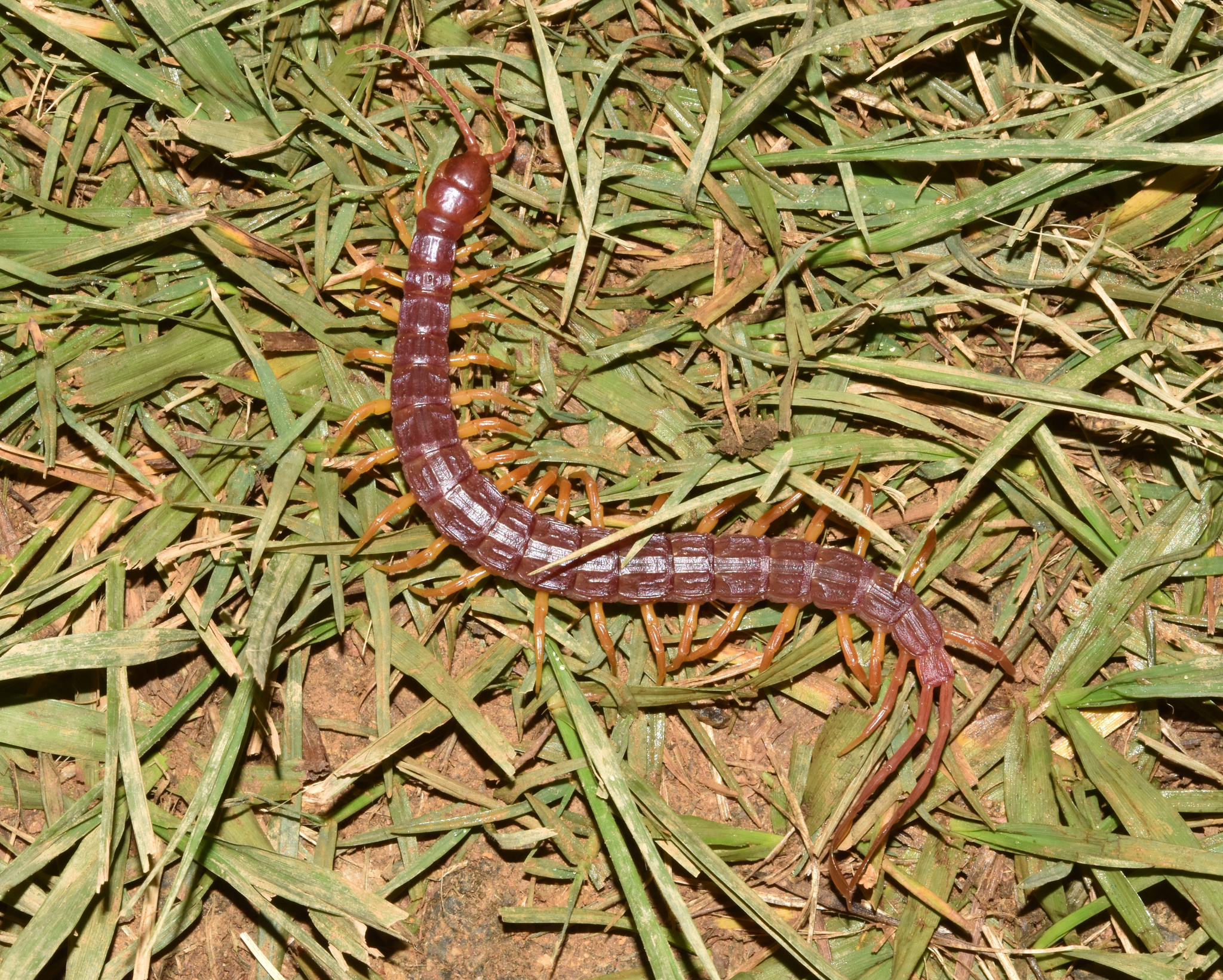
Alipes sp. photographed in South Africa

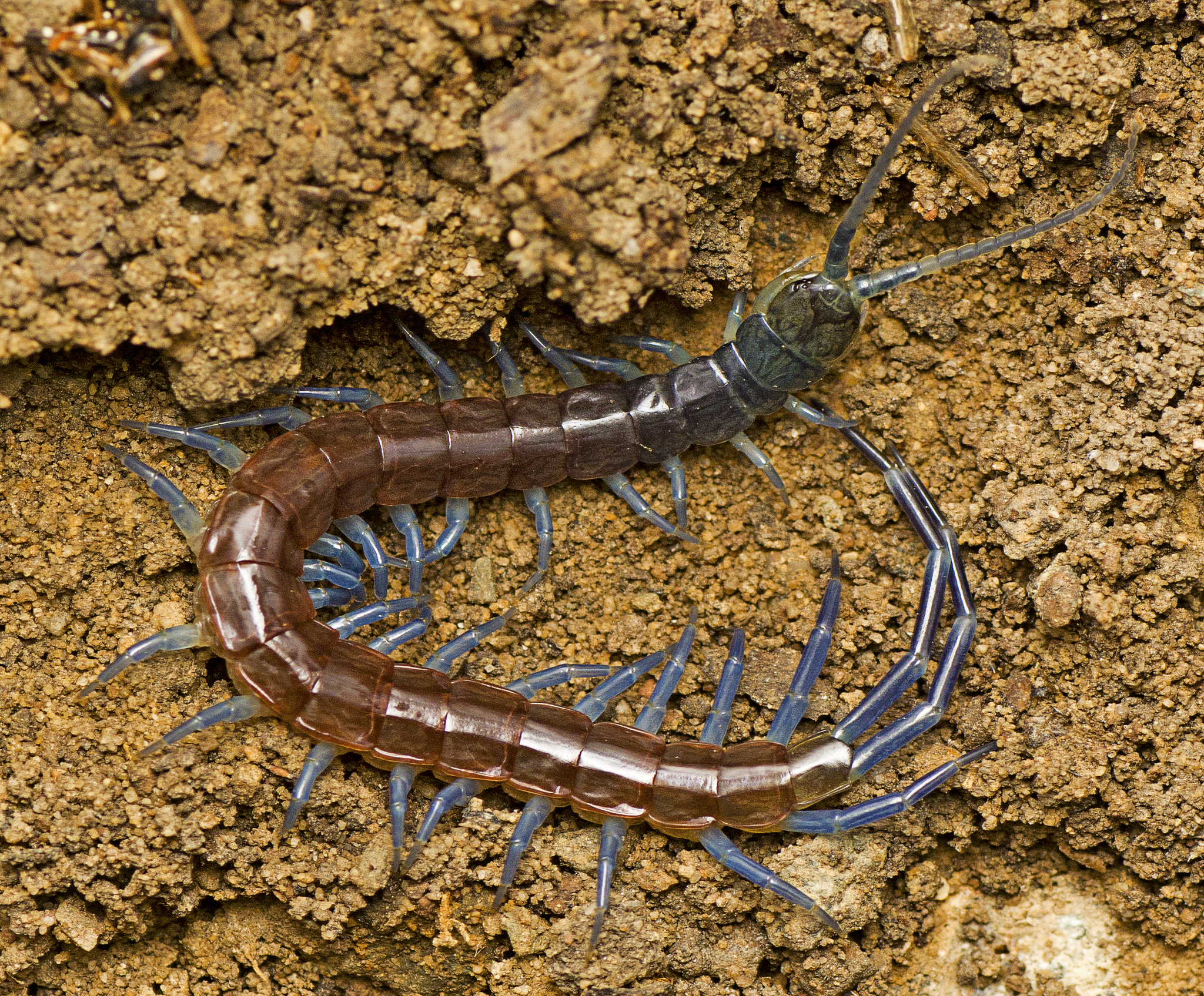
R. nuda photographed in Brisbane, Australia

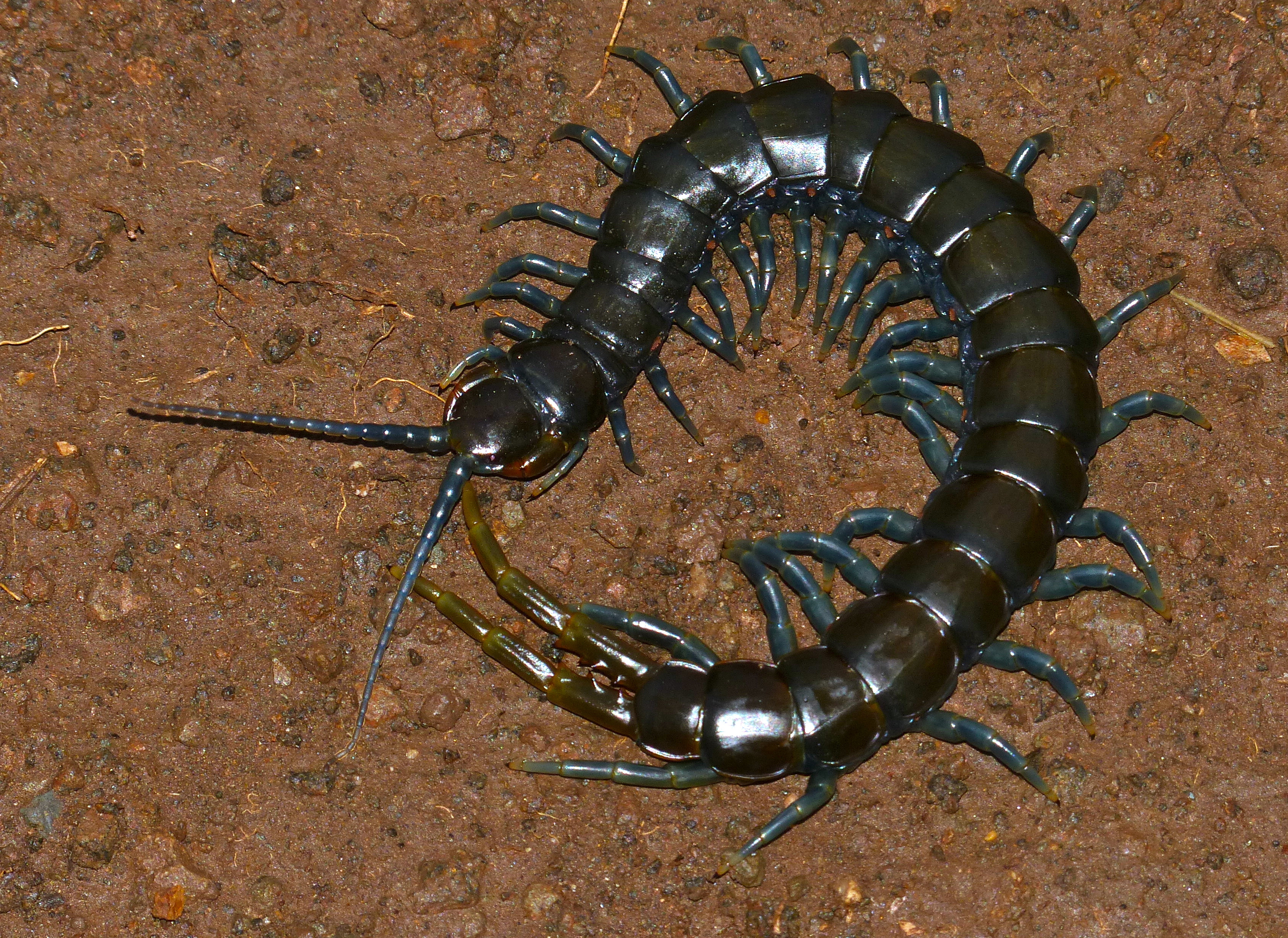
E. trignopodus photographed in South Africa

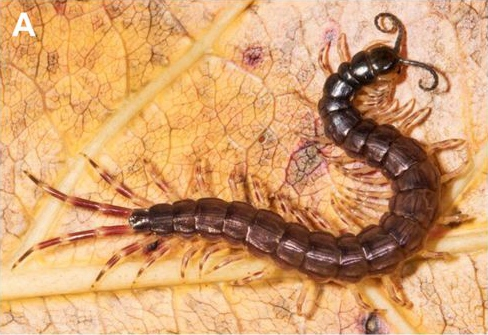
O. pococki photographed in Trinidad

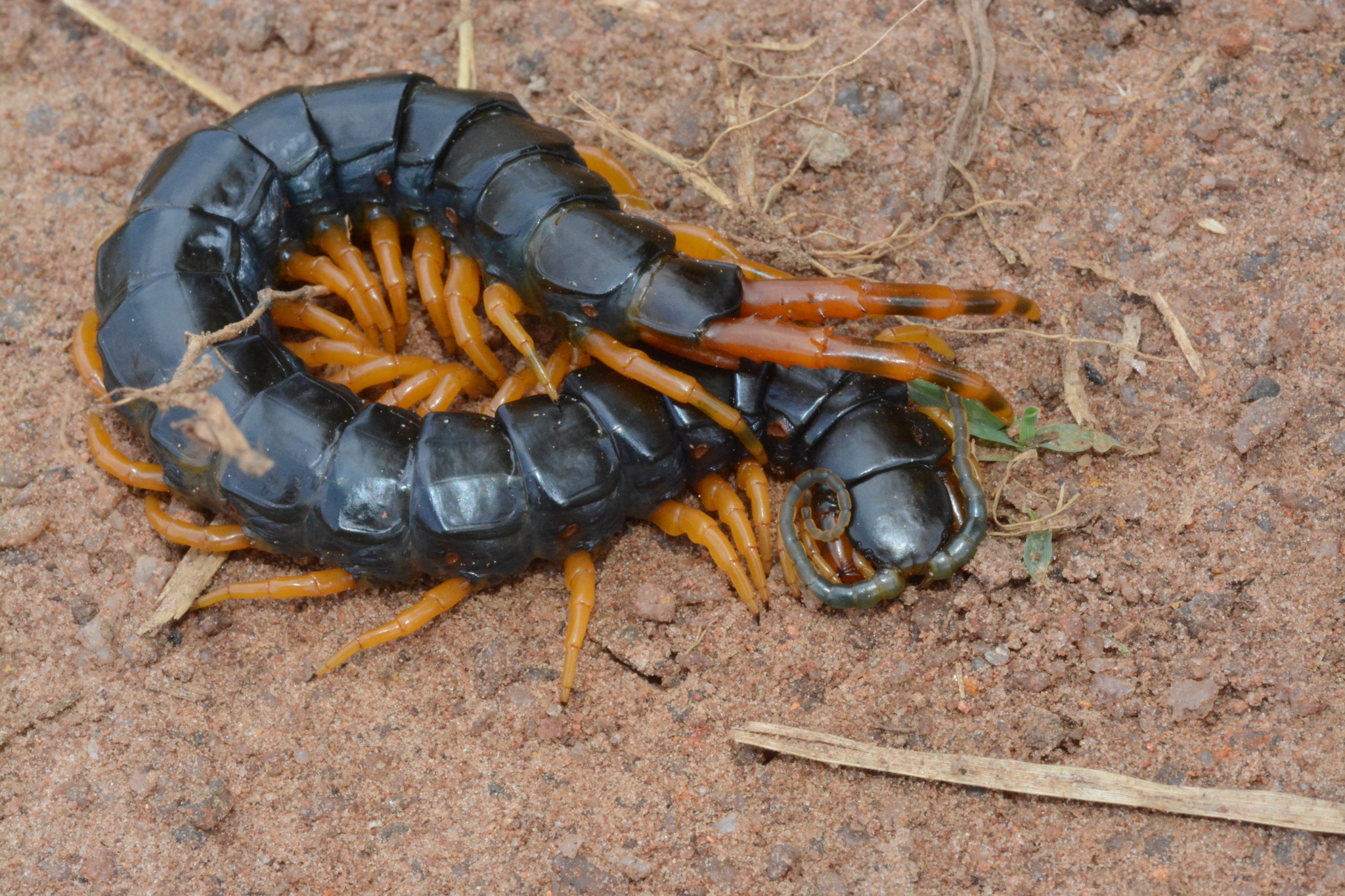
E. trigonopodus photographed in Tanzania
