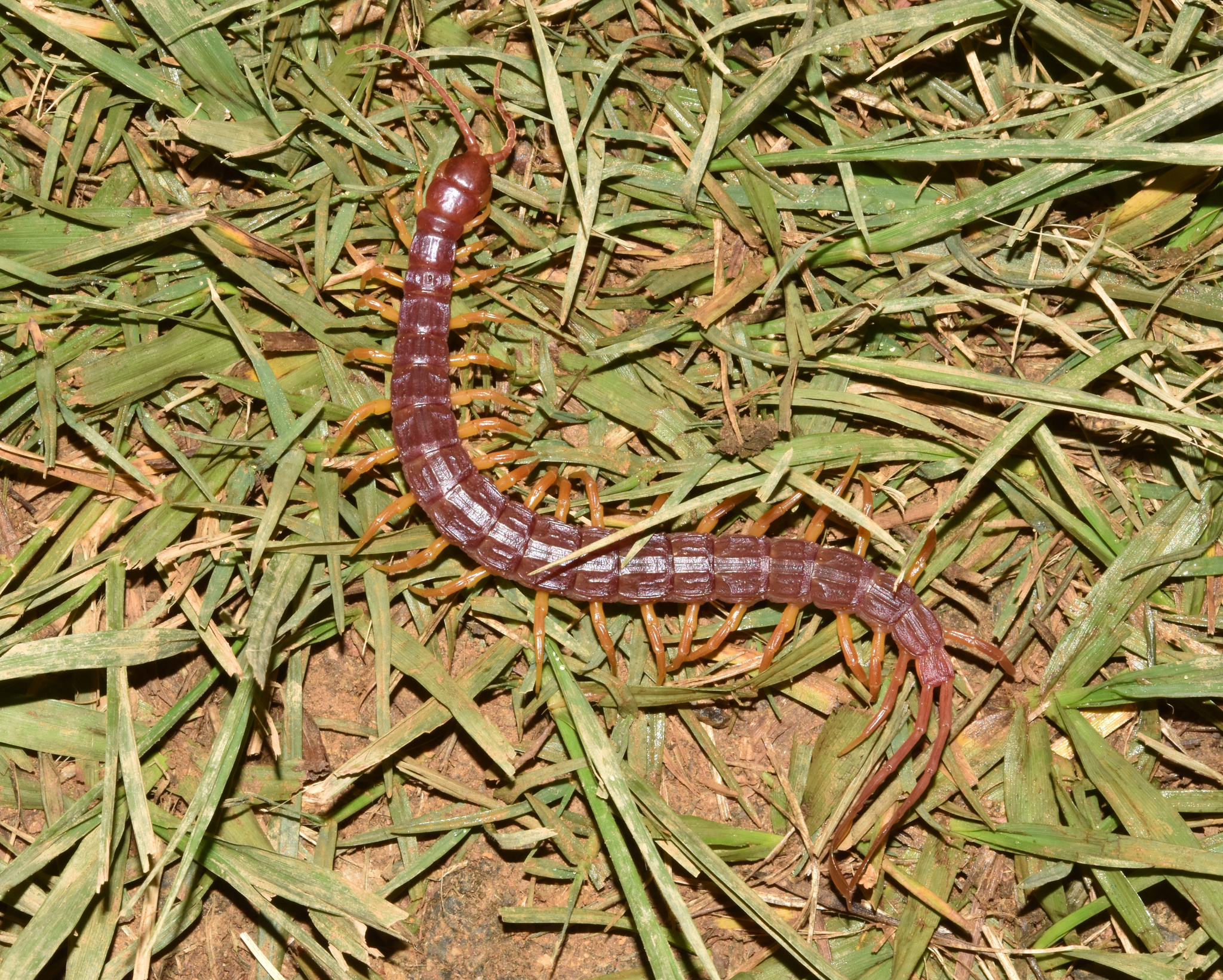
- Alipes, South Africa
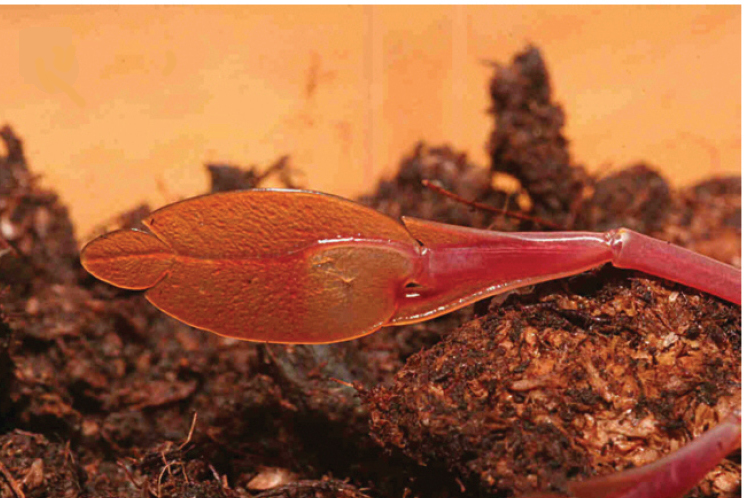
- The distinctive leaf-like ultimate legs of A. grandidieri.

Scientific classification
- Kingdom: Animalia
- Phylum: Arthropoda
- Subphylum: Myriapoda
- Class: Chilopoda
- Order: Scolopendromorpha
- Family: Scolopendridae
- Subfamily: Otostigminae
- Genus: Alipes; Imhoff, 1854

Type species
- Alipes multicostis Imhoff, 1854

Species
- See text

Synonyms
- Eucorybas Gerstaecker, 1854

= Alipes (centipede) =

Genus of centipedes

Alipes is a genus of bark centipedes in the family Scolopendridae found in Africa, characterized by their leaf-like ultimate legs used to deter predators.

== Morphology ==
Alipes specimens range from 65 to 130 millimetres (2.6 to 5.1 in) in length, and are reddish-brown to purple in coloration. They bear 21 pairs of legs, including the specialized ultimate legs. Oblique spiracles are present on the pleurites of segments 3, 5, and evenly numbered segments from 8 onwards. Tergites bear several longitudinal striations, while sternites are smooth and trapezoidal, with the ultimate sternite being nearly triangular.

=== Ultimate legs ===
While the last pair of legs, or ultimate legs, is undifferentiated in juvenile Alipes, they develop into colorful leaf-like structures upon reaching adulthood. To deter predators, individuals will swing their ultimate legs horizontally as a display mechanism, while producing a hissing noise through stridulation. This does not happen when interacting with conspecifics. Autotomy is also possible as a means of escape, and the ultimate legs will continue stridulating after detaching. The frequency of stridulation ranges from 10 to 80 kHz, and the sound itself is louder in larger individuals.

Unlike in many other scolopendrids, the ultimate legs lack spines on the prefemur and coxopleural process, the latter of which is reduced. In males, a sexually dimorphic cylindrical process is present on the inner side of the prefemur. The prefemur and femur are elongated, with the tibia being the first segment to show signs of flattening. The metatarsus makes up the bulk of the flattened area, which ends with the tarsus tapering off. A process bearing thin horizontal striations extends from the lower part of the tibia, and is in contact with the lower metatarsus, whose surface is even more thinly striated. Stridulation occurs when the metatarsus articulates with the tibia.

== Classification ==
A 2011 molecular phylogeny found Alipes to be related to Ethmostigmus and Indian species of Rhysida in the tribe Otostigmini, with an estimated divergence time of 109 mya. A later 2018 study found weak support for a basal position in Otostigminae, with Bayesian inference placing it as sister to the primarily New World subgenus Parotostigmus, determined to be separate from the rest of Otostigmus, and maximum likelihood placing it as the earliest diverging member of the subfamily before Parotostigmus. The relationship between Alipes and Parotostigmus was described as consistent with a 2014 morphological-molecular phylogeny, although the authors remarked that relevant genetic material was still scarce.

== Species ==
These six species belong to the genus Alipes:

- Alipes appendiculatus Pocock, 1896 (Malawi and Mozambique)
- Alipes calcipes Cook, 1897 (Angola and Zimbabwe)
- Alipes crotalus (Gerstaecker, 1854) (Mozambique, South Africa, and Uganda)
- Alipes grandidieri Lucas, 1864 (Kenya, Tanzania, and Uganda)
- Alipes madegassus Saussure & Zehntner, 1902 (Madagascar), alternatively spelled Alipes madecassus
- Alipes multicostis Imhoff, 1854 (Cameroon, the Democratic Republic of the Congo, Ghana, Rwanda, and Sierra Leone)
