= Otostigmus tricarinatus =

Scientific classification
- Kingdom: Animalia
- Phylum: Arthropoda
- Subphylum: Myriapoda
- Class: Chilopoda
- Order: Scolopendromorpha
- Family: Scolopendridae
- Genus: Otostigmus
- Species: O. tricarinatus

Binomial name
- Otostigmus tricarinatus Chen, Jiang & Huang, 2023

Species of centipede

Otostigmus tricarinatus is a species of scolopendrid centipede from southern and southwestern China in the Yunnan–Guizhou Plateau and Guangxi, first described by Chen, Jiang & Huang in 2023.
