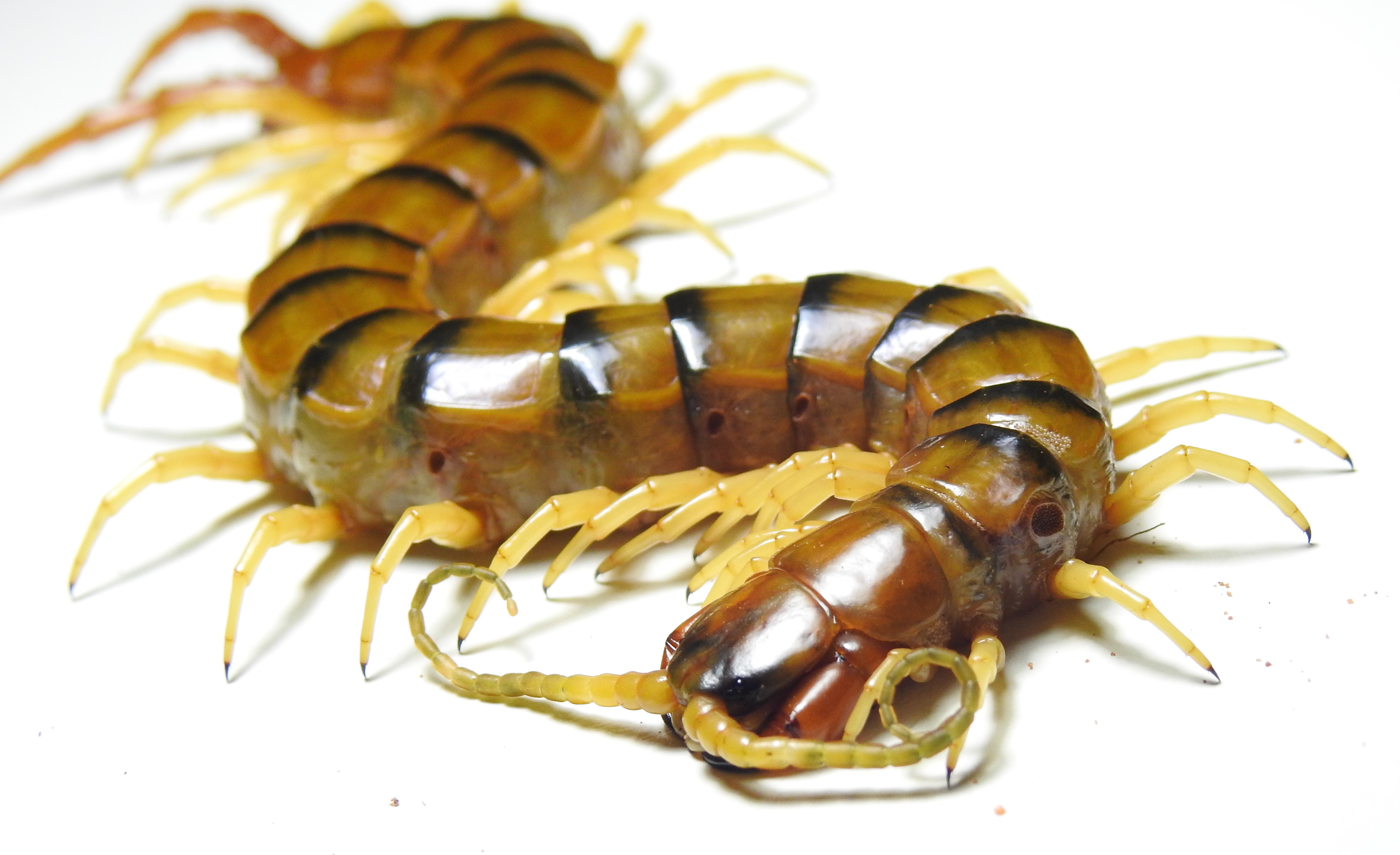

Scientific classification
- Domain: Eukaryota
- Kingdom: Animalia
- Phylum: Arthropoda
- Subphylum: Myriapoda
- Class: Chilopoda
- Order: Scolopendromorpha
- Family: Scolopendridae
- Subfamily: Otostigminae
- Genus: Ethmostigmus
- Species: E. rubripes

Binomial name
- Ethmostigmus rubripes (Brandt, 1840)

Subspecies
- Ethmostigmus rubripes platycephalus Newport, 1845; Ethmostigmus rubripes rubripes (Brandt, 1840); Ethmostigmus rubripes spinosus (Newport, 1845)

Synonyms
- Ethmostigmus australianus Chamberlin, 1920; Heterostoma bisulcatum Tömösváry, 1885; Heterostoma crassipes Silvestri, 1894; Heterostoma fasciata Newport, 1845; Heterostoma flava Newport, 1845; Scolopendra megacephala Newport, 1844; Scolopendra rapax Gervais, 1847; Scolopendra scabriventris Newport, 1844; Scolopendra spinulosa Brandt, 1840; Scolopendra squalidens Newport, 1844; Scolopendra sulcicornis Newport, 1844; Scolopendra sulcidens Newport, 1844; Heterostoma rubripes grossipes Pocock, 1891

= Ethmostigmus rubripes =

Species of centipede

Ethmostigmus rubripes, commonly known as the giant centipede, is a species of centipede in the family Scolopendridae. It is a solitary nocturnal predator found across Asia and Oceania, with three subspecies currently described.

== Description ==
E. rubripes is a medium to extremely large centipede with 25 or 27 body segments and 21 or 23 pairs of legs. The tergites may be various shades of brown, green, orange, or yellow, sometimes with a dark border. The antennae are yellow and long to very long, typically composed of 19-20 segments with the first 3-4 segments being glabrous. The legs are yellow, and the morphology of the anal leg coxopleura may vary substantially.

== Distribution and habitat ==
E. rubripes is widely distributed across Asia and Oceania and inhabits a variety of habitats across its range, including deserts, woodlands, rainforests, and urban areas. It tolerates dry and moist conditions alike, and can often be found sheltering beneath logs, bark, leaf litter, or rocks.

== Subspecies ==
This species includes the following subspecies:

- Ethmostigmus rubripes platycephalus Newport, 1845 – Umboi, Duke of York Islands, New Britain, Tahiti, Solomon Islands, New Guinea, Indonesia, Maluku Islands, Philippines, Spratly Island, Sri Lanka, Laos, Vietnam, Cambodia, China, Australia (dubious)
- Ethmostigmus rubripes rubripes (Brandt, 1840) – Indonesia, Borneo, Java (type locality), Laos, China, Solomon Islands, New Zealand, Enderbury Island, New Guinea, Australia (widespread on mainland, also found on some offshore islands)
- Ethmostigmus rubripes spinosus (Newport, 1845) – Sri Lanka, Myanmar, Vietnam
