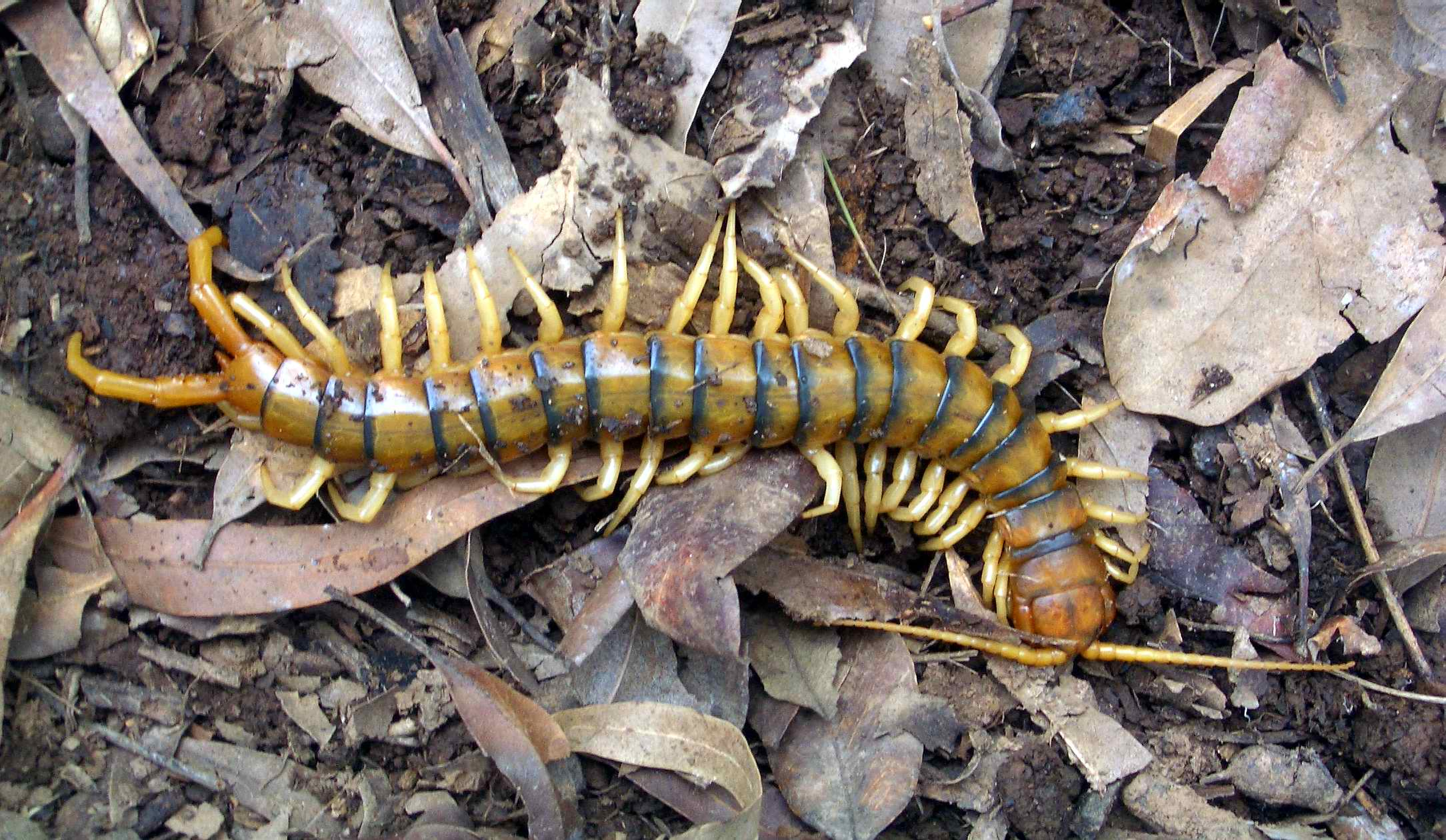
- E. rubripes photographed in Queensland, Australia

Scientific classification
- Kingdom: Animalia
- Phylum: Arthropoda
- Subphylum: Myriapoda
- Class: Chilopoda
- Order: Scolopendromorpha
- Family: Scolopendridae
- Subfamily: Otostigminae
- Genus: Ethmostigmus; Pocock, 1898

Type species
- E. trigonopodus (Leach, 1817)

Species
- 21; see text

Synonyms
- Dacetum C.L. Koch, 1847; Heterostoma Newport, 1844

= Ethmostigmus =

Genus of centipedes

Ethmostigmus is a genus of centipedes in the family Scolopendridae found in Africa, Asia, and Oceania that is characterised by its large, rounded spiracles.

== Distribution and habitat ==
This genus is widely distributed, with its members being found in tropical and warm temperate regions of Africa, Asia (particularly Southeast Asia and the Indian subcontinent), and Oceania (particularly Australia, Melanesia, and Polynesia).

== Species ==
This genus includes the following species:

- Ethmostigmus agasthyamalaiensis Joshi & Edgecombe 2018 – India (Kerala)
- Ethmostigmus albidus (Tömösváry, 1885) – Singapore
- Ethmostigmus californicus Chamberlin, 1958
- Ethmostigmus coonooranus Chamberlin 1920 – India (Tamil Nadu)
- Ethmostigmus curtipes L. E. Koch 1983 – Australia (Western Australia)
- Ethmostigmus granulosus Pocock 1898 – Papua New Guinea
- Ethmostigmus muiri L. E. Koch 1983 – Australia (Western Australia)
- Ethmostigmus nudior L. E. Koch 1983 – Australia (Northern Territory)
- Ethmostigmus pachysoma L. E. Koch 1983 – Australia (Western Australia)
- Ethmostigmus parkeri L. E. Koch 1983 – Australia (Western Australia)
- Ethmostigmus praveeni Joshi & Edgecombe 2018 – India (Karnataka)
- Ethmostigmus pygomegas (Kohlrausch 1878) – Himalaya
- Ethmostigmus relictus Chamberlin 1944 – Indonesia (Western New Guinea)
- Ethmostigmus rubripes (Brandt, 1840) – Asia, Oceania (widespread)

- E. rubripes platycephalus (Newport 1845)
- E. rubripes rubripes (Brandt 1840)
- E. rubripes spinosus (Newport 1845)

- Ethmostigmus rugosus (Haase, 1887) – Indonesia (Halmahera)
- Ethmostigmus sahyadrensis Joshi & Edgecombe 2018 – India (Maharashtra)
- Ethmostigmus trigonopodus (Leach, 1817) (type) – Africa (widespread)

- E. trigonopodus pygomenasoides Lewis, 1992
- E. trigonopodus trigonopodus (Leach, 1817)

- Ethmostigmus tristis (Meinert, 1886) – India (Tamil Nadu)
- Ethmostigmus venenosus (Attems, 1897) – Indonesia (Maluku Province, Sulawesi)
- Ethmostigmus waiainus Chamberlin, 1920 – Solomon Islands

== Gallery ==
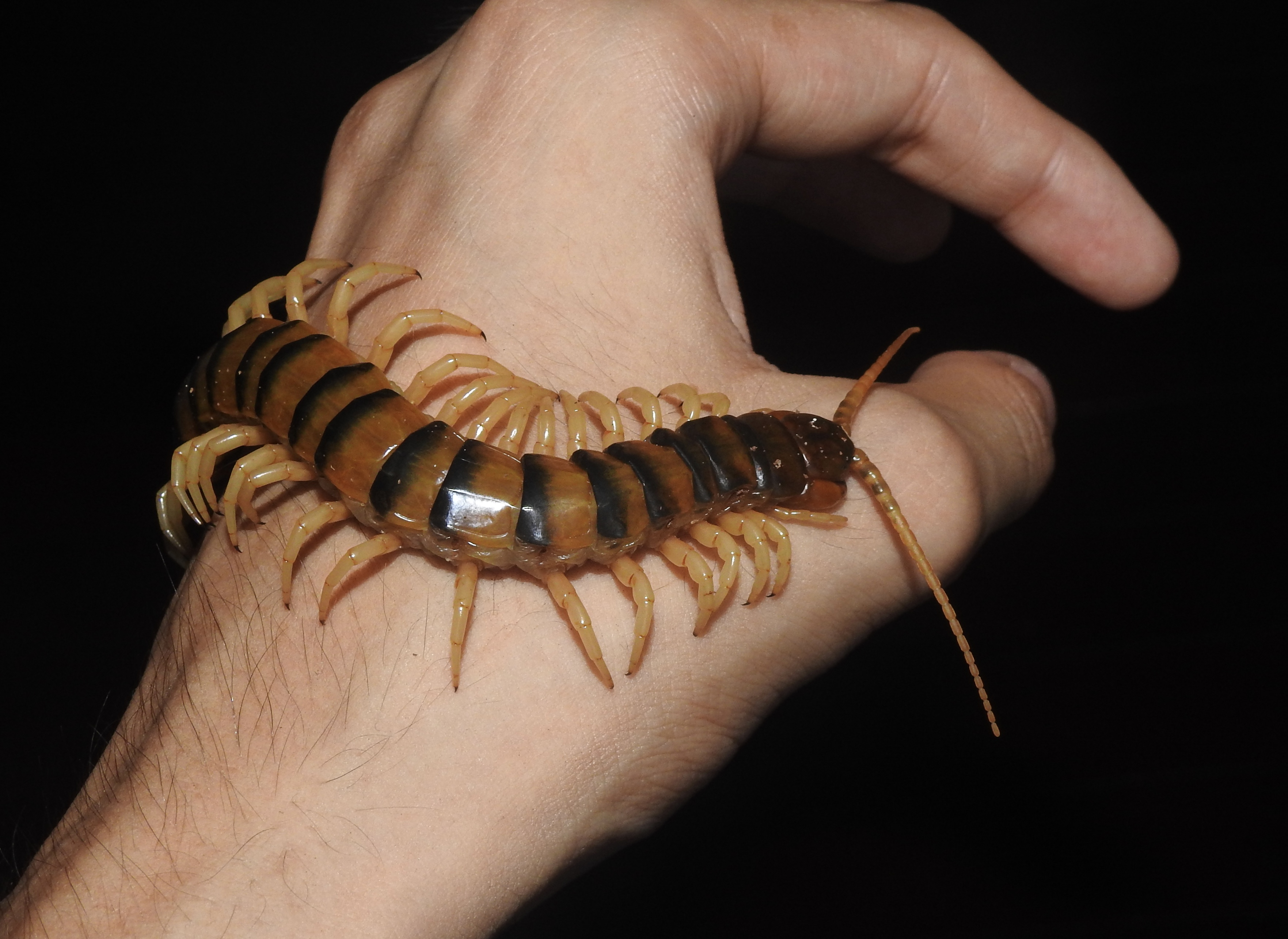
E. rubripes photographed in Queensland, Australia

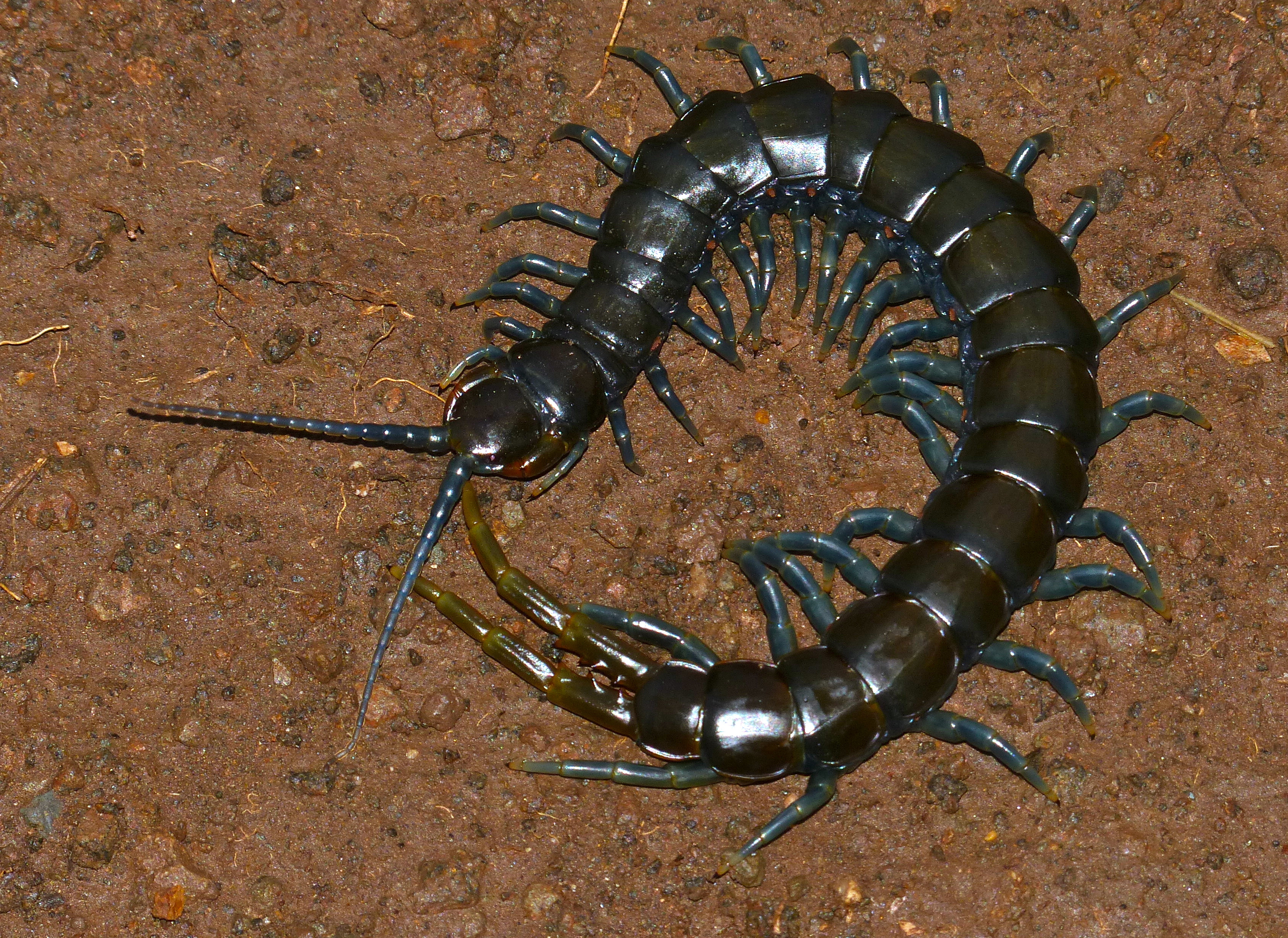
E. trignopodus photographed in South Africa

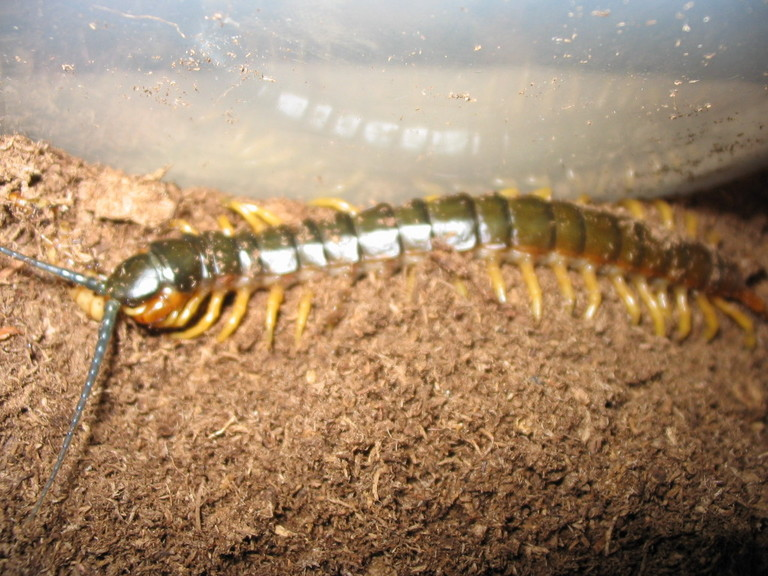
E. trignopodus, possibly the subspecies E. trignopodus pygmenasoides

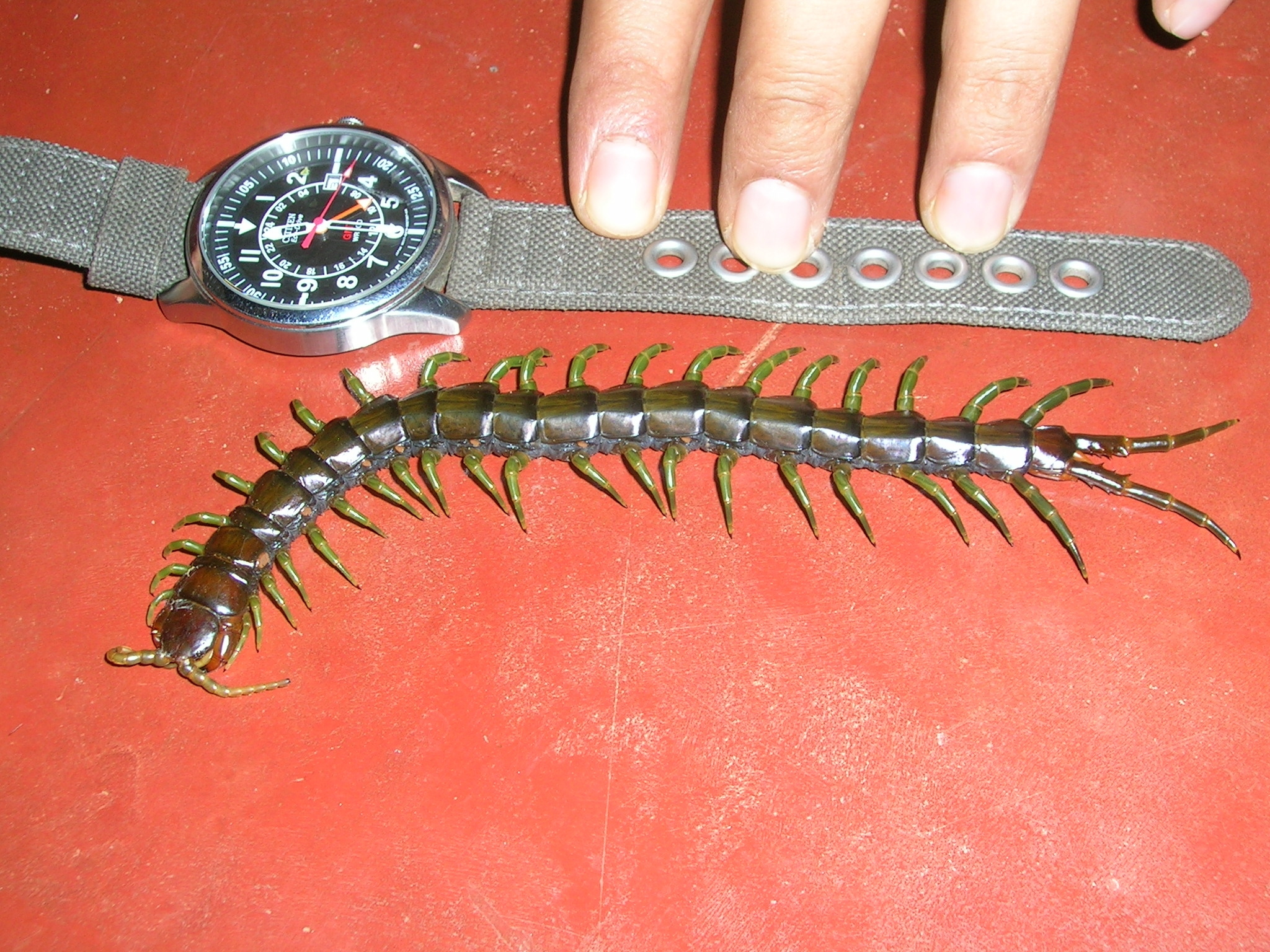
Unidentified Ethmostigmus photographed in Kerala, India.

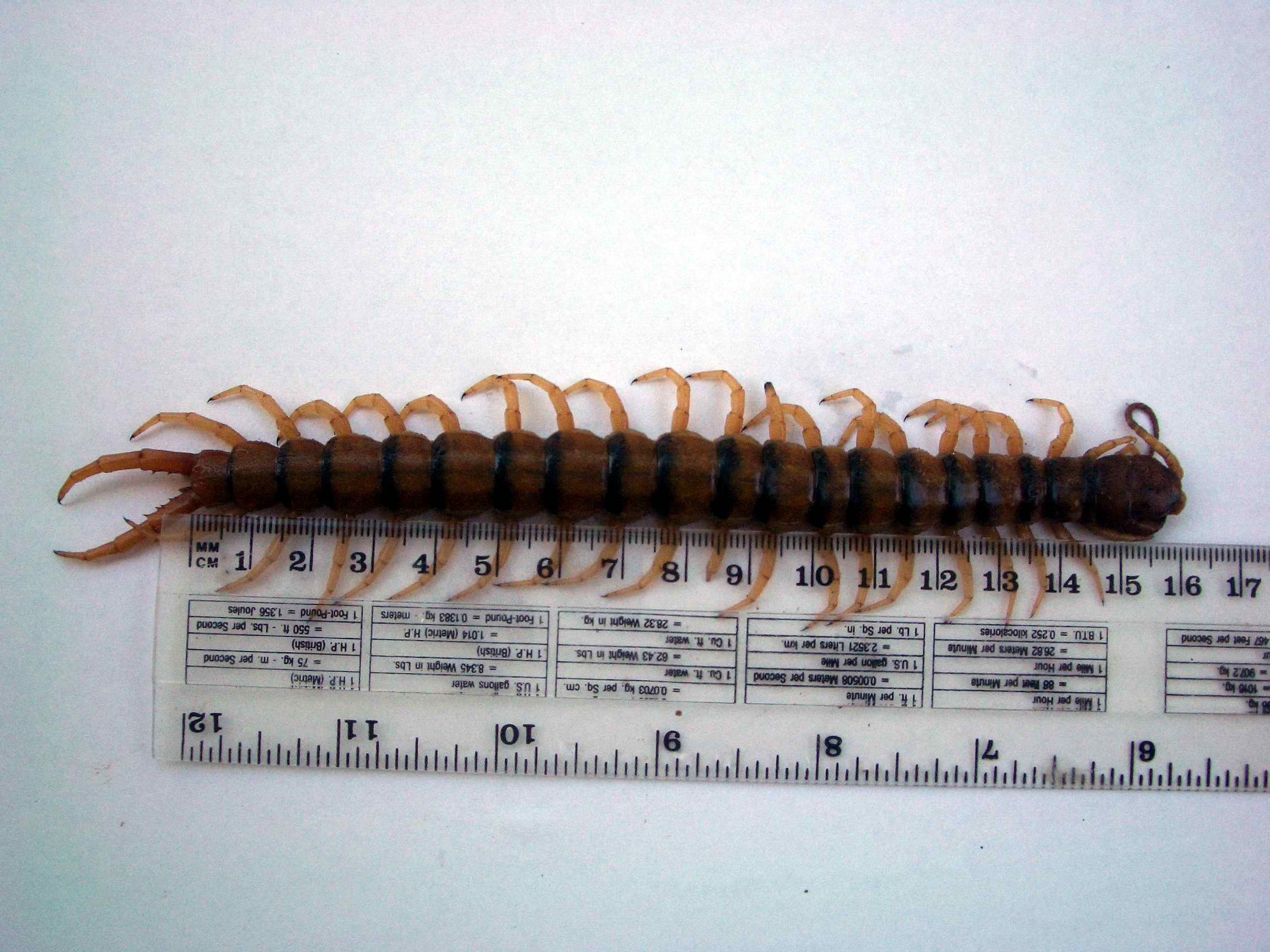
E. rubripes from Queensland, Australia with ruler for scale

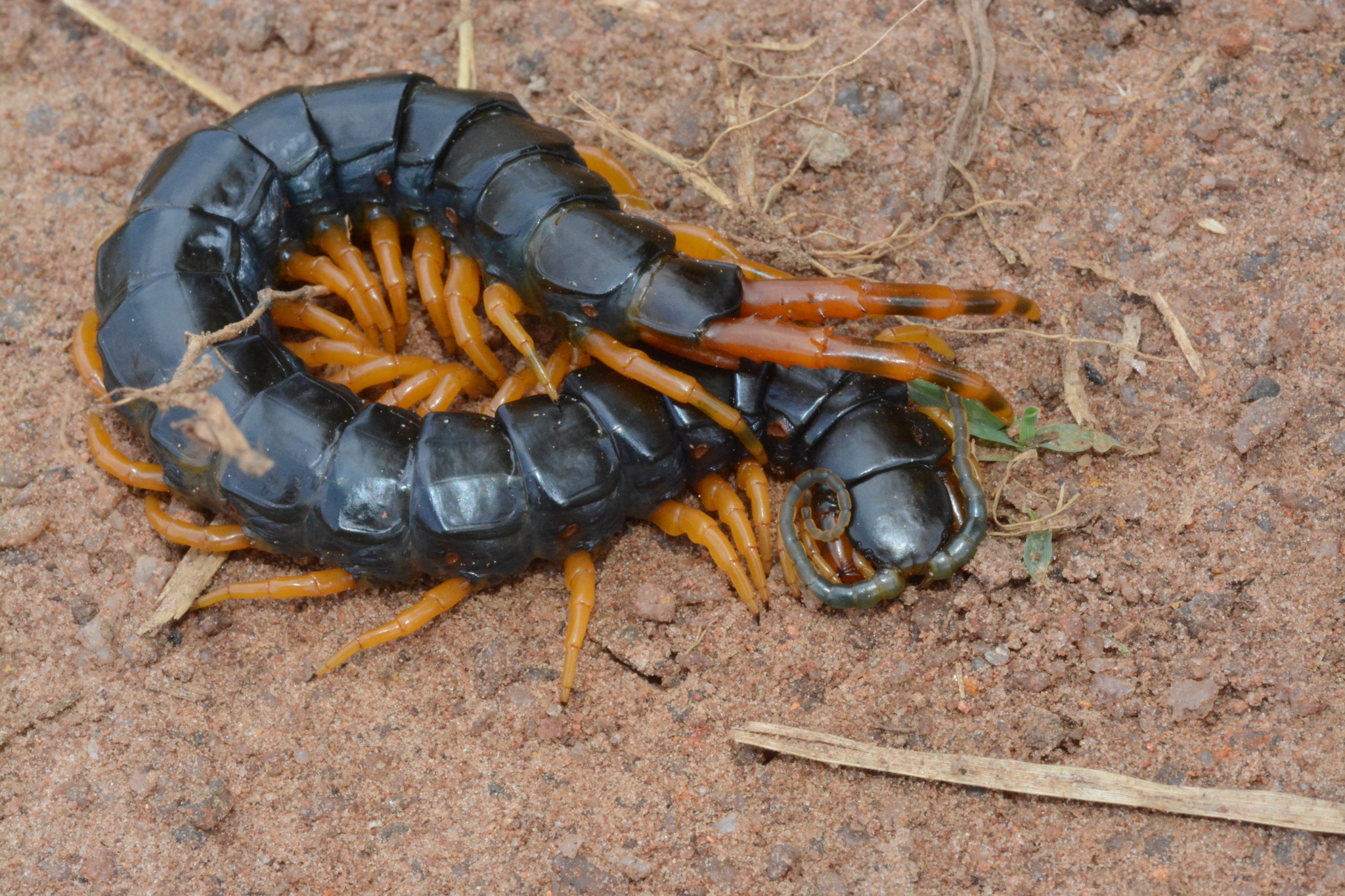
E. trigonopodus photographed in Tanzania
