= Otostigmus loriae =

Scientific classification
- Kingdom: Animalia
- Phylum: Arthropoda
- Subphylum: Myriapoda
- Class: Chilopoda
- Order: Scolopendromorpha
- Family: Scolopendridae
- Genus: Otostigmus
- Species: O. loriae

Binomial name
- Otostigmus loriae Silvestri, 1894

Synonyms
- Otostigmus bakeri Chamberlin, 1921

Species of centipede

Otostigmus loriae is a species of centipede in the Scolopendridae family. It was described in 1894 by Italian myriapodologist Filippo Silvestri.

== Distribution ==
The species occurs in South-East Asia and New Guinea. The type locality is Moroka, Papua New Guinea.

== Subspecies ==
- Otostigmus loriae nordicus Schileyko, 1995
- Otostigmus loriae loriae Silvestri, 1894
