= Otostigmus punctiventer =

Scientific classification
- Kingdom: Animalia
- Phylum: Arthropoda
- Subphylum: Myriapoda
- Class: Chilopoda
- Order: Scolopendromorpha
- Family: Scolopendridae
- Genus: Otostigmus
- Species: O. punctiventer

Binomial name
- Otostigmus punctiventer (Tömösváry, 1885)

Synonyms
- Branchiostoma punctiventer Newport, 1845

Species of centipede

Otostigmus punctiventer is a species of centipede in the Scolopendridae family. It was described in 1885 by Hungarian myriapodologist Ödön Tömösváry.

== Distribution ==
The species occurs in South-East Asia and New Guinea.
