= Aluniș, Mureș =

Aluniș Magyaró
- Commune
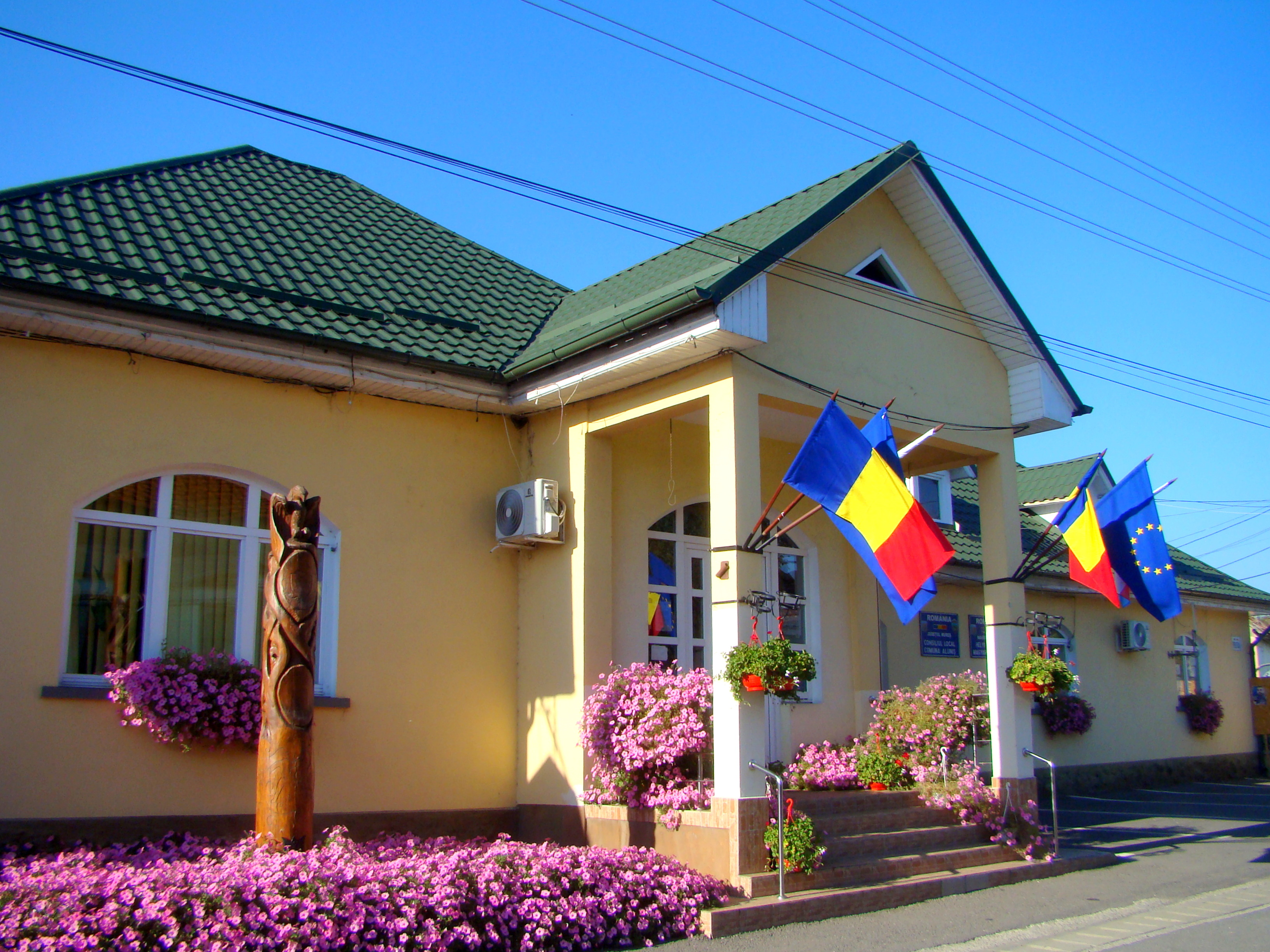
- Aluniș town hall

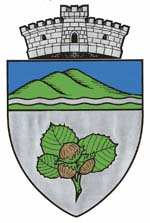
- Coat of arms

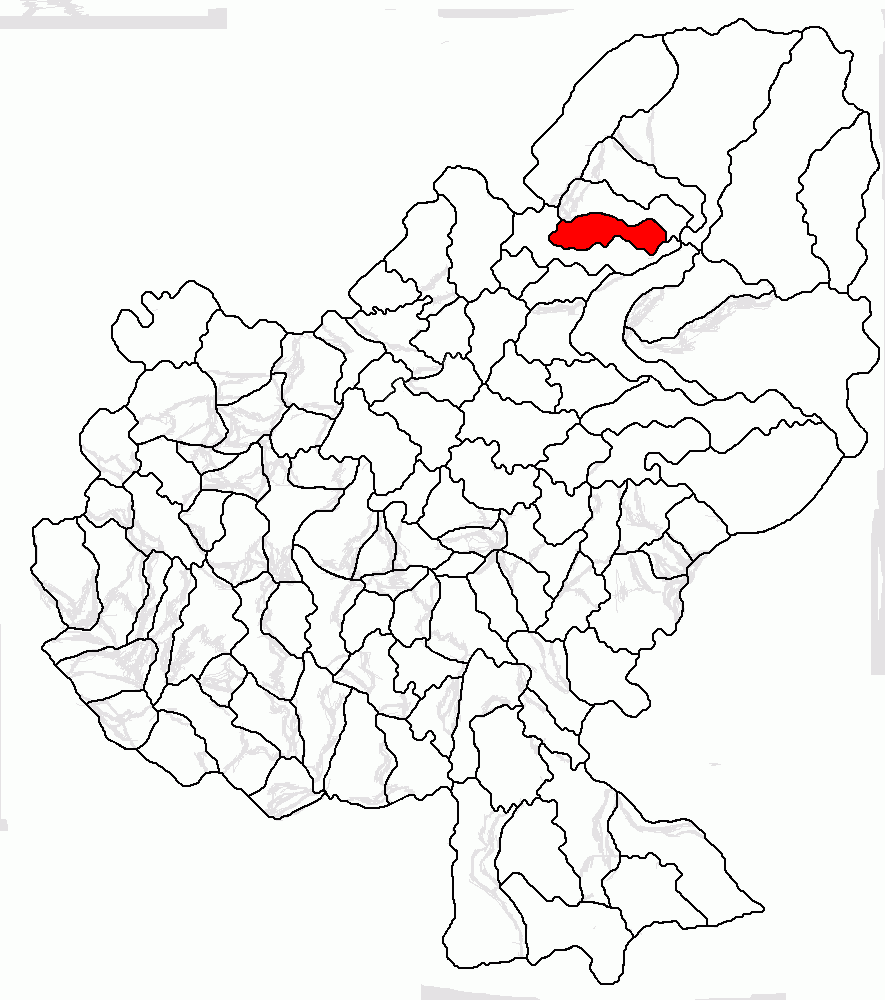
- Location in Mureș County

- Location in Romania
- Coordinates: 46.9°N 24.82°E
- Country: Romania
- County: Mureș

Government
  - Mayor (2024–2028): József Lóránt Kristóf (UDMR)
- Area: 40.65 km^{2} (15.70 sq mi)
- Elevation: 412 m (1,352 ft)
- Population (2021-12-01): 3,058
  - Density: 75.23/km^{2} (194.8/sq mi)
- Time zone: UTC+02:00 (EET)
  - Summer (DST): UTC+03:00 (EEST)
- Postal code: 547035
- Area code: +(40) 265
- Vehicle reg.: MS
- Website: www.primaria-alunis.ro

Aluniș (Hungarian: Magyaró [mɒɡiɒroː]) is a commune in Mureș County, Transylvania, Romania. It is composed of three villages: Aluniș, Fițcău (Fickópataka), and Lunca Mureșului (Holtmaros).

== Natives ==
- Iosif Banc (1921–2007), Romanian communist politician
- Ödön Tömösváry (1852–1884), Hungarian naturalist, myriapodologist, and entomologist

== See also ==
- List of Hungarian exonyms (Mureș County)
