= Otostigmus ceylonicus =

Scientific classification
- Kingdom: Animalia
- Phylum: Arthropoda
- Subphylum: Myriapoda
- Class: Chilopoda
- Order: Scolopendromorpha
- Family: Scolopendridae
- Genus: Otostigmus
- Species: O. ceylonicus

Binomial name
- Otostigmus ceylonicus Haase, 1887

Species of centipede

Otostigmus ceylonicus is a species of centipedes in the family Scolopendridae. It is known only from Sri Lanka.
