= Ethmostigmus granulosus =

Scientific classification
- Kingdom: Animalia
- Phylum: Arthropoda
- Subphylum: Myriapoda
- Class: Chilopoda
- Order: Scolopendromorpha
- Family: Scolopendridae
- Genus: Ethmostigmus
- Species: E. granulosus

Binomial name
- Ethmostigmus granulosus Pocock, 1898

Species of centipede

Ethmostigmus granulosus is a species of centipede in the Scolopendridae family. It was described in 1898 by British zoologist Reginald Innes Pocock.

== Distribution ==
The species occurs in New Britain, Papua New Guinea.
