= Otostigmus ateles =

Scientific classification
- Kingdom: Animalia
- Phylum: Arthropoda
- Subphylum: Myriapoda
- Class: Chilopoda
- Order: Scolopendromorpha
- Family: Scolopendridae
- Genus: Otostigmus
- Species: O. ateles

Binomial name
- Otostigmus ateles Chamberlin, 1920

Species of centipede

Otostigmus ateles is a species of centipede in the Scolopendridae family. It is endemic to Australia and was first described in 1920 by American biologist Ralph Vary Chamberlin.

== Distribution ==
The species occurs in northern and eastern coastal Queensland.

== Behaviour ==
The centipedes are solitary terrestrial predators that inhabit plant litter, soil and rotting wood.
