= Otostigmus multidens =

Scientific classification
- Kingdom: Animalia
- Phylum: Arthropoda
- Subphylum: Myriapoda
- Class: Chilopoda
- Order: Scolopendromorpha
- Family: Scolopendridae
- Genus: Otostigmus
- Species: O. multidens

Binomial name
- Otostigmus multidens Haase, 1887

Synonyms
- Otostigmus armatus Attems, 1953; Otostigmus latidens Pocock, 1894; Otostigmus modiglianii Silvestri, 1895; Otostigmus ruficeps Pocock, 1890

Species of centipede

Otostigmus multidens is a species of centipede in the Scolopendridae family. It was described in 1887 by German entomologist Erich Haase.

== Etymology ==
The genus name Otostigmus comes from Ancient Greek οὖς (oûs), meaning 'ear', and στίγμα (stígma), meaning 'brand'. The specific epithet multidens comes from Latin multus, meaning 'many', and dens, meaning 'tooth'.

== Distribution ==
The species occurs in Sulawesi and New Guinea. The type locality is Sulawesi.
