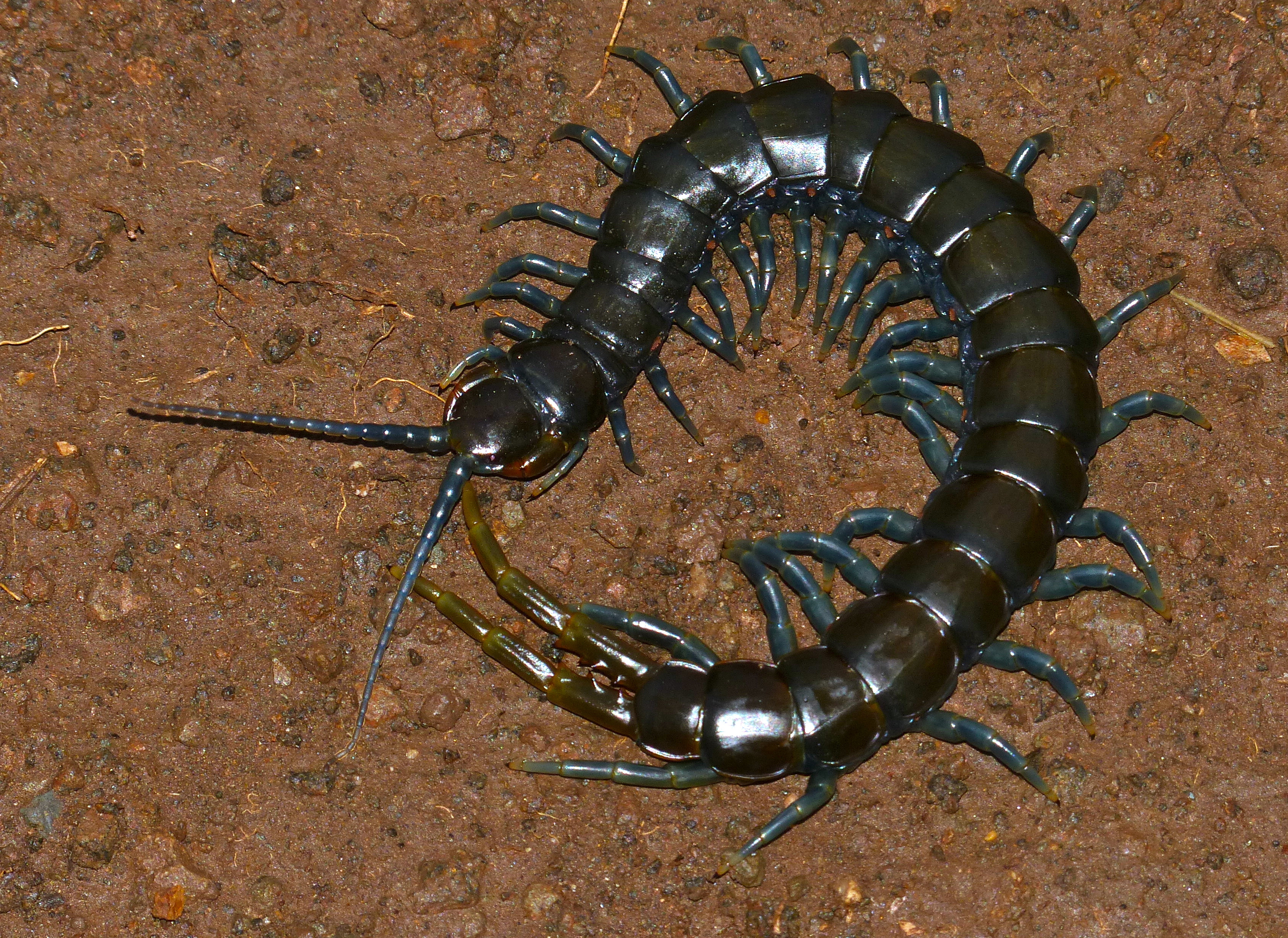

Scientific classification
- Domain: Eukaryota
- Kingdom: Animalia
- Phylum: Arthropoda
- Subphylum: Myriapoda
- Class: Chilopoda
- Order: Scolopendromorpha
- Family: Scolopendridae
- Genus: Ethmostigmus
- Species: E. trigonopodus

Binomial name
- Ethmostigmus trigonopodus Leach, 1817

= Ethmostigmus trigonopodus =

Species of centipede

Ethmostigmus trigonopodus is a species of centipede in the family Scolopendridae. It goes by a number of common names, including the African giant centipede and the Tanzanian blue ring centipede.

Ethmostigmus trigonopodus from northern parts of Nigeria can reach sexual maturity within one year, which is uncommon in centipedes.

There exist two valid subspecies, E. trigonopodus trigonopodus, and E. trigonopodus pygmenasoides.

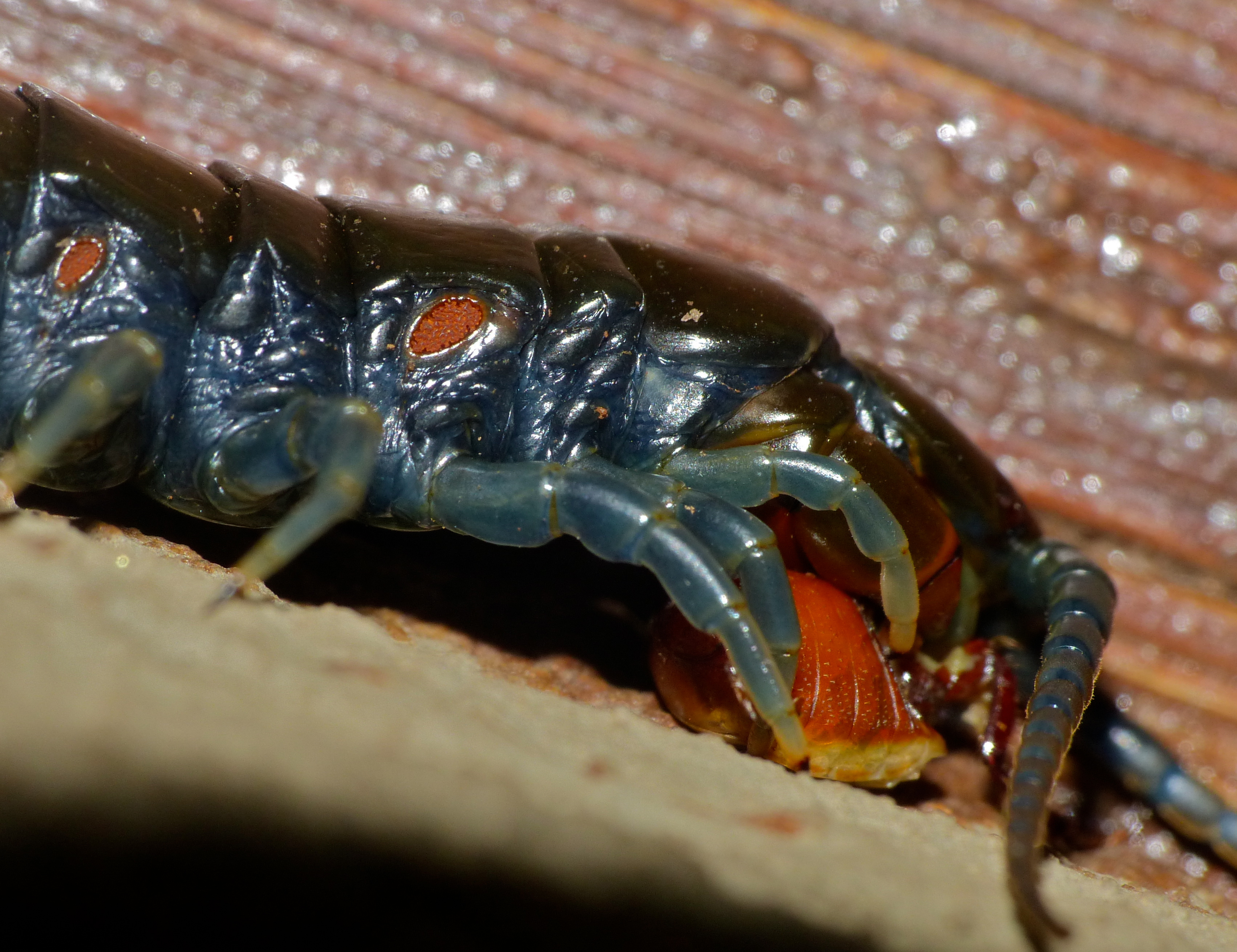
Blue-legged Centipede (Ethmostigmus trigonopodus) close-up

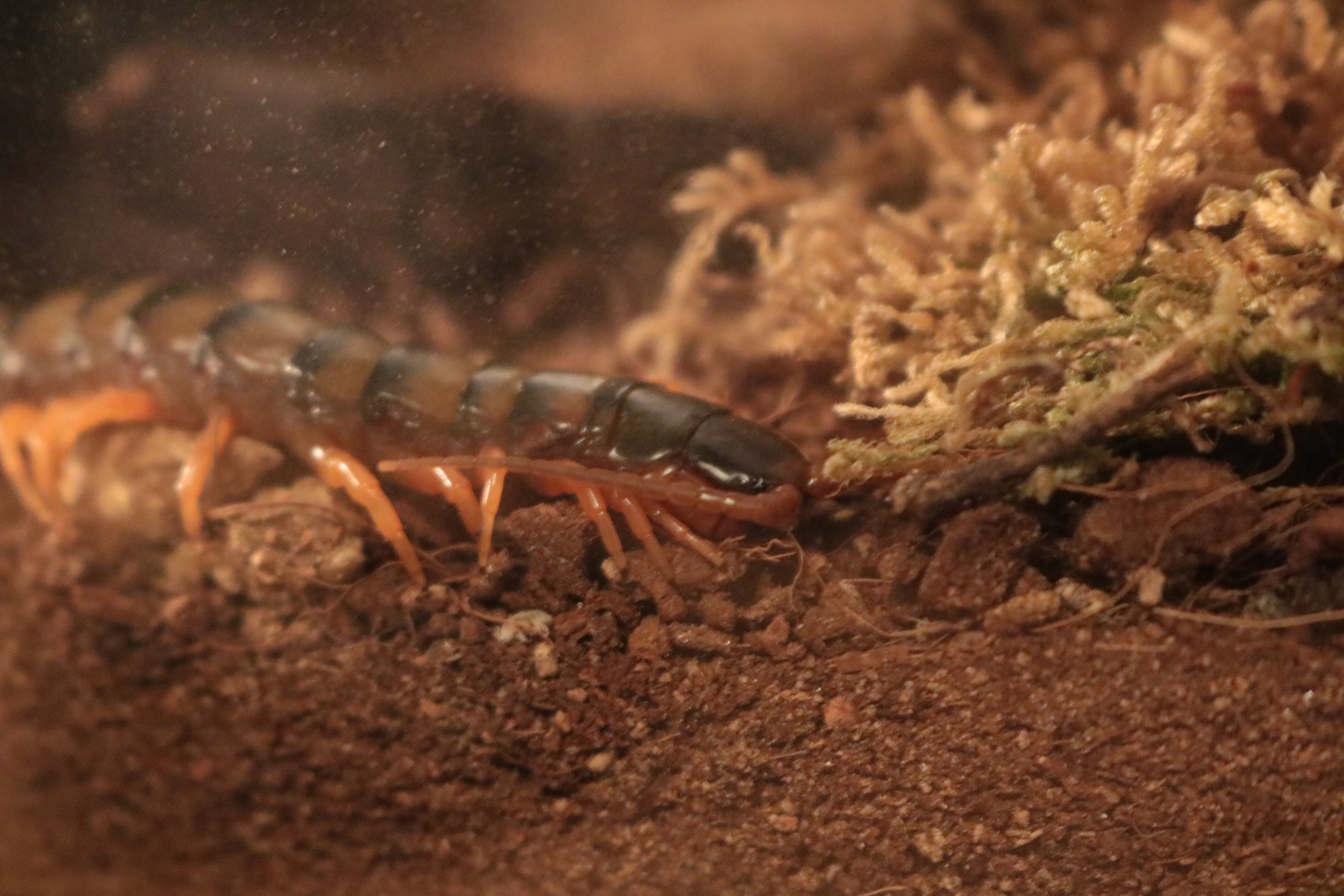
E. trigonopodus

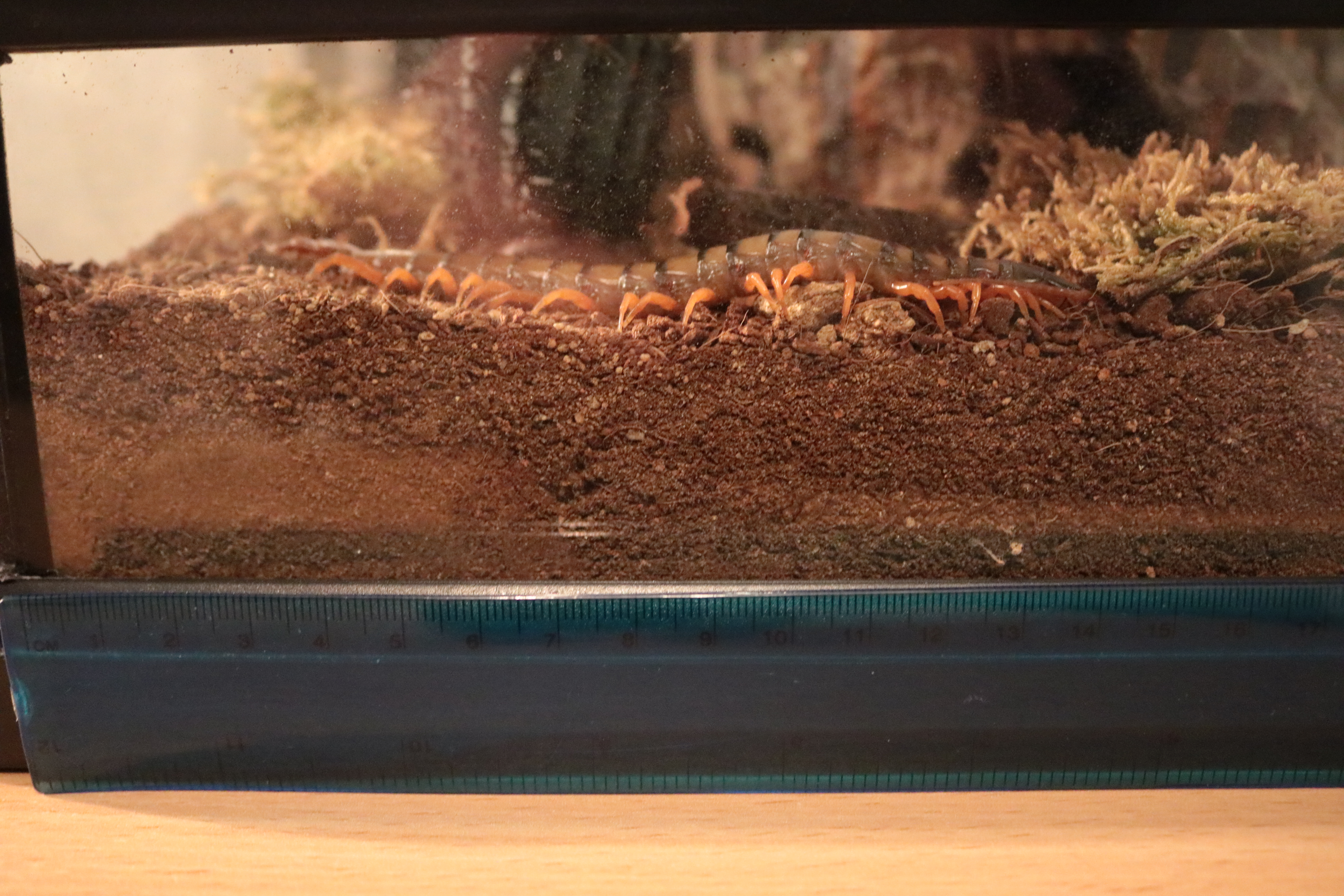

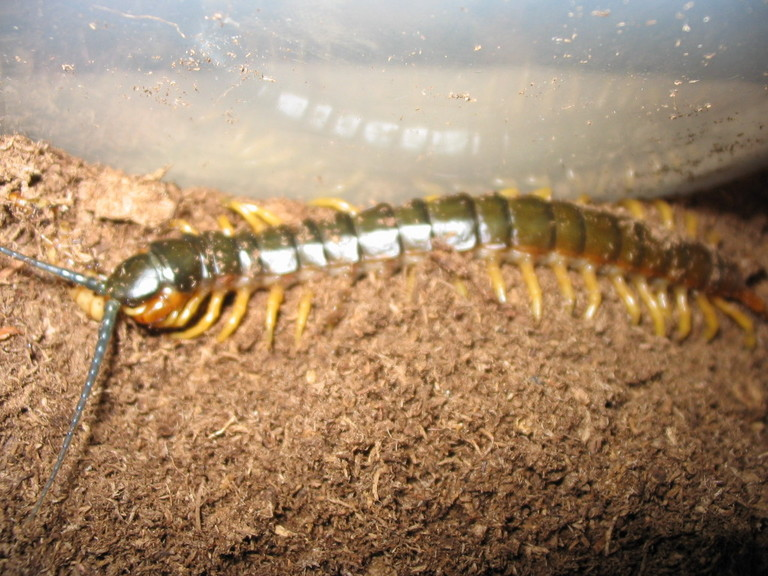

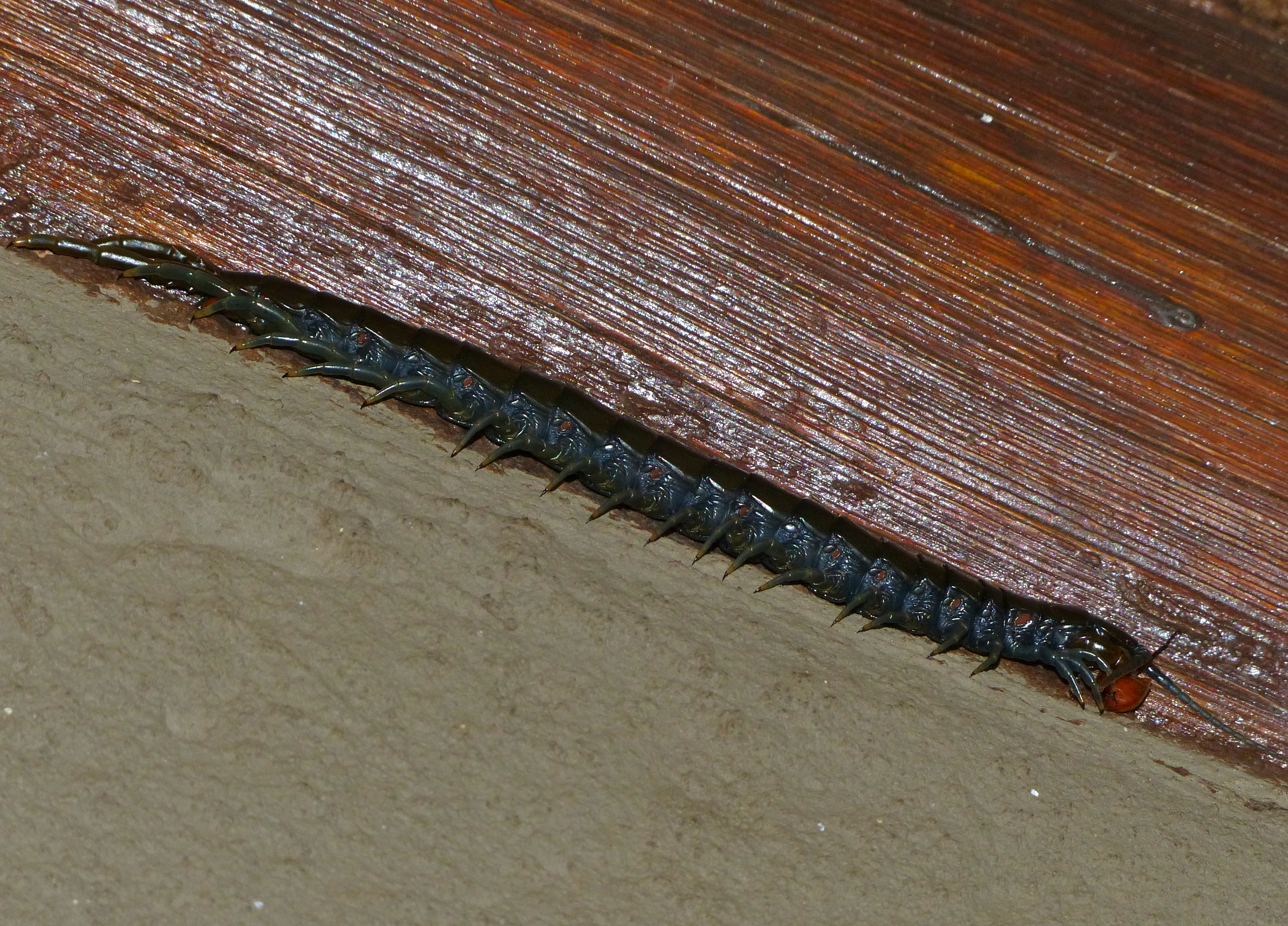
