= Otostigmus astenus =

Scientific classification
- Kingdom: Animalia
- Phylum: Arthropoda
- Subphylum: Myriapoda
- Class: Chilopoda
- Order: Scolopendromorpha
- Family: Scolopendridae
- Genus: Otostigmus
- Species: O. astenus

Binomial name
- Otostigmus astenus (Köhlrausch, 1878)

Synonyms
- Branchiotrema luzonicum Kohlrausch, 1878; Branchiotrema calcitrans Kohlrausch, 1878; Otostigmus orientalis acutidens Haase, 1887; Otostigmus discretum Silvestri, 1894; Otostigmus barbouri Chamberlin, 1914; Otostigmus moluccanus Chamberlin, 1914; Otostigmus glaber Chamberlin, 1920

Species of centipede

Otostigmus astenus is a species of centipede in the Scolopendridae family. It was first described in 1878 by E. Köhlrausch.

== Distribution ==
The species has been recorded from Australia, Melanesia, the Philippines and Indonesia, as well as from some Pacific and Indian Ocean islands.

== Behaviour ==
The centipedes are solitary terrestrial predators that inhabit plant litter, soil and rotting wood.
