= Otostigmus telus =

Scientific classification
- Kingdom: Animalia
- Phylum: Arthropoda
- Subphylum: Myriapoda
- Class: Chilopoda
- Order: Scolopendromorpha
- Family: Scolopendridae
- Genus: Otostigmus
- Species: O. telus

Binomial name
- Otostigmus telus Chamberlin, 1939

Species of centipede

Otostigmus telus is a species of centipede in the Scolopendridae family. It was described in 1939 by American myriapodologist Ralph Vary Chamberlin.

== Distribution ==
The species occurs in New Guinea. The type locality is Pionierbivak, Mamberamo River, north-western New Guinea.
