= Ethmostigmus muiri =

Scientific classification
- Kingdom: Animalia
- Phylum: Arthropoda
- Subphylum: Myriapoda
- Class: Chilopoda
- Order: Scolopendromorpha
- Family: Scolopendridae
- Genus: Ethmostigmus
- Species: E. muiri

Binomial name
- Ethmostigmus muiri L.E.Koch, 1983

Species of centipede

Ethmostigmus muiri is a species of centipede in the Scolopendridae family. It is endemic to Australia and was first described in 1983 by L. E. Koch.

== Distribution ==
The species has been recorded from northern and eastern Queensland and from north-west Western Australia.

== Behaviour ==
The centipedes are solitary terrestrial predators that inhabit plant litter, soil and rotting wood.
