= Otostigmus chiltoni =

Scientific classification
- Kingdom: Animalia
- Phylum: Arthropoda
- Subphylum: Myriapoda
- Class: Chilopoda
- Order: Scolopendromorpha
- Family: Scolopendridae
- Genus: Otostigmus
- Species: O. chiltoni

Binomial name
- Otostigmus chiltoni Archey, 1921

Species of centipede

Otostigmus chiltoni is a species of centipede in the Scolopendridae family, endemic to New Zealand. It was first described in 1921 by New Zealand zoologist Gilbert Archey.

== Distribution ==
The type locality is the Three Kings Islands group, located off the northern tip of the North Island.
