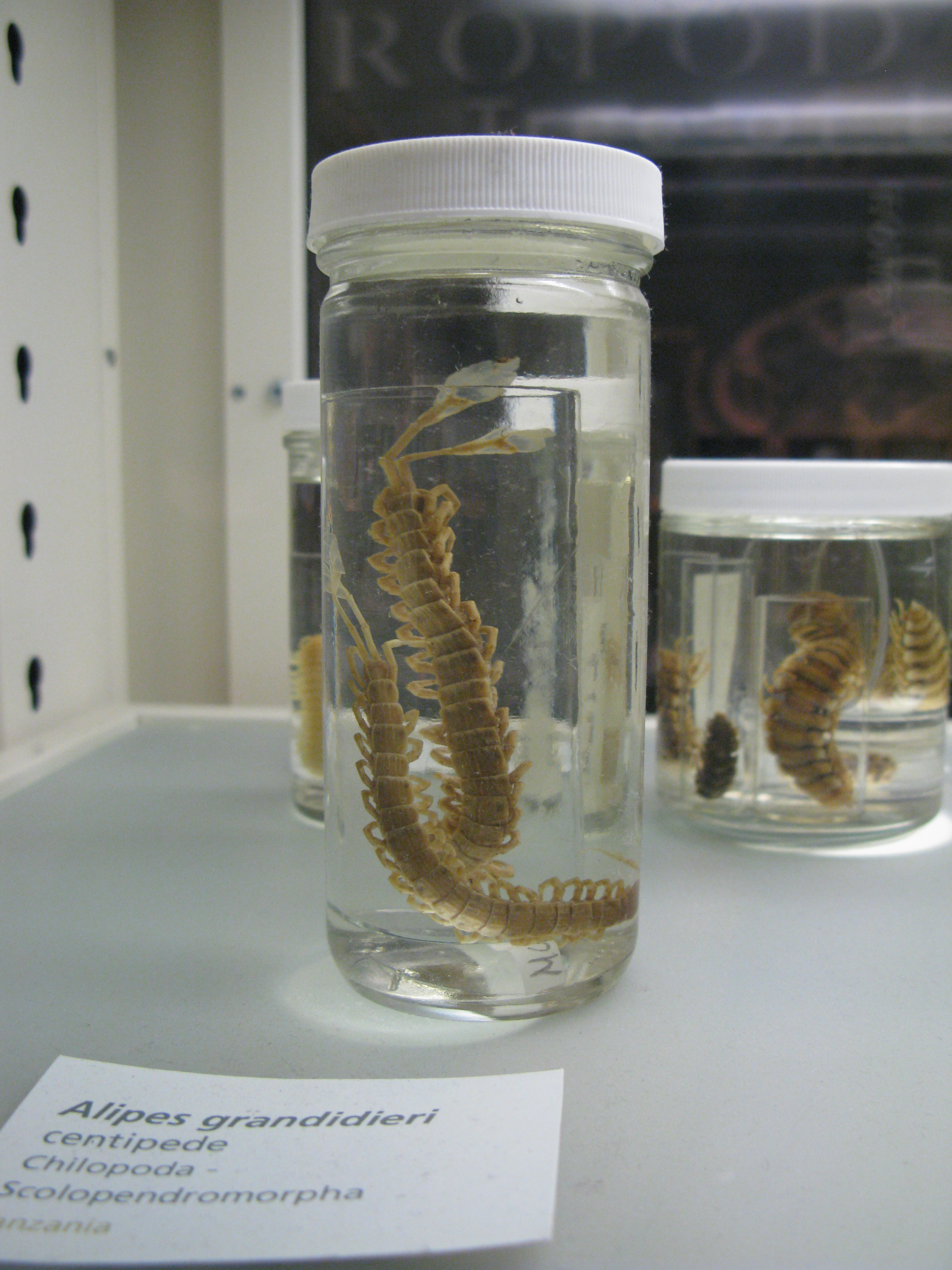
- Preserved specimen in Harvard Museum of Natural History
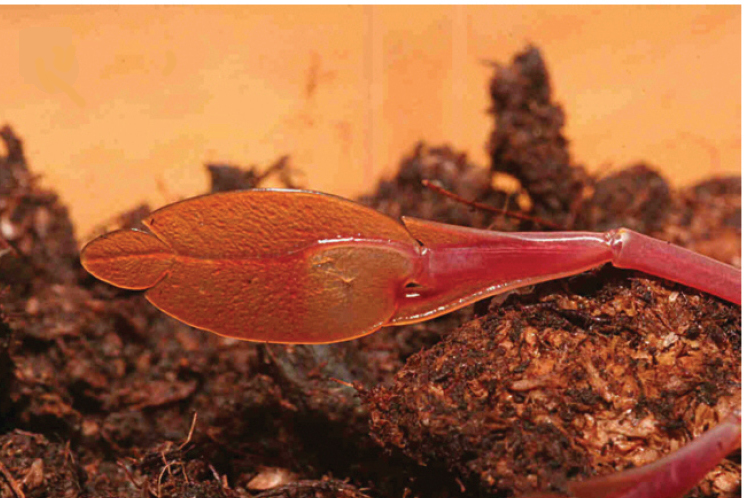
- Closeup of an ultimate leg

Scientific classification
- Domain: Eukaryota
- Kingdom: Animalia
- Phylum: Arthropoda
- Subphylum: Myriapoda
- Class: Chilopoda
- Order: Scolopendromorpha
- Family: Scolopendridae
- Genus: Alipes
- Species: A. grandidieri

Binomial name
- Alipes grandidieri (Lucas 1864)

Synonyms
- Eucorybas Grandidieri Lucas 1864

= Alipes grandidieri =

Species of centipede

Alipes grandidieri, most commonly known as the feather-tail centipede, is a species of centipede. It is a member of the genus Alipes and the family Scolopendridae. It was first described from Zanzibar, as Eucorybas Grandidieri [sic] by Hippolyte Lucas in 1864.

The species range is in eastern Africa, in Kenya, Tanzania, and Uganda.

It has distinctive, elongated ultimate legs with laterally-flattened pads on the distal portions, resembling feathers. When threatened they will shake these legs and make a hissing sound. The body is 10–15 cm long.
