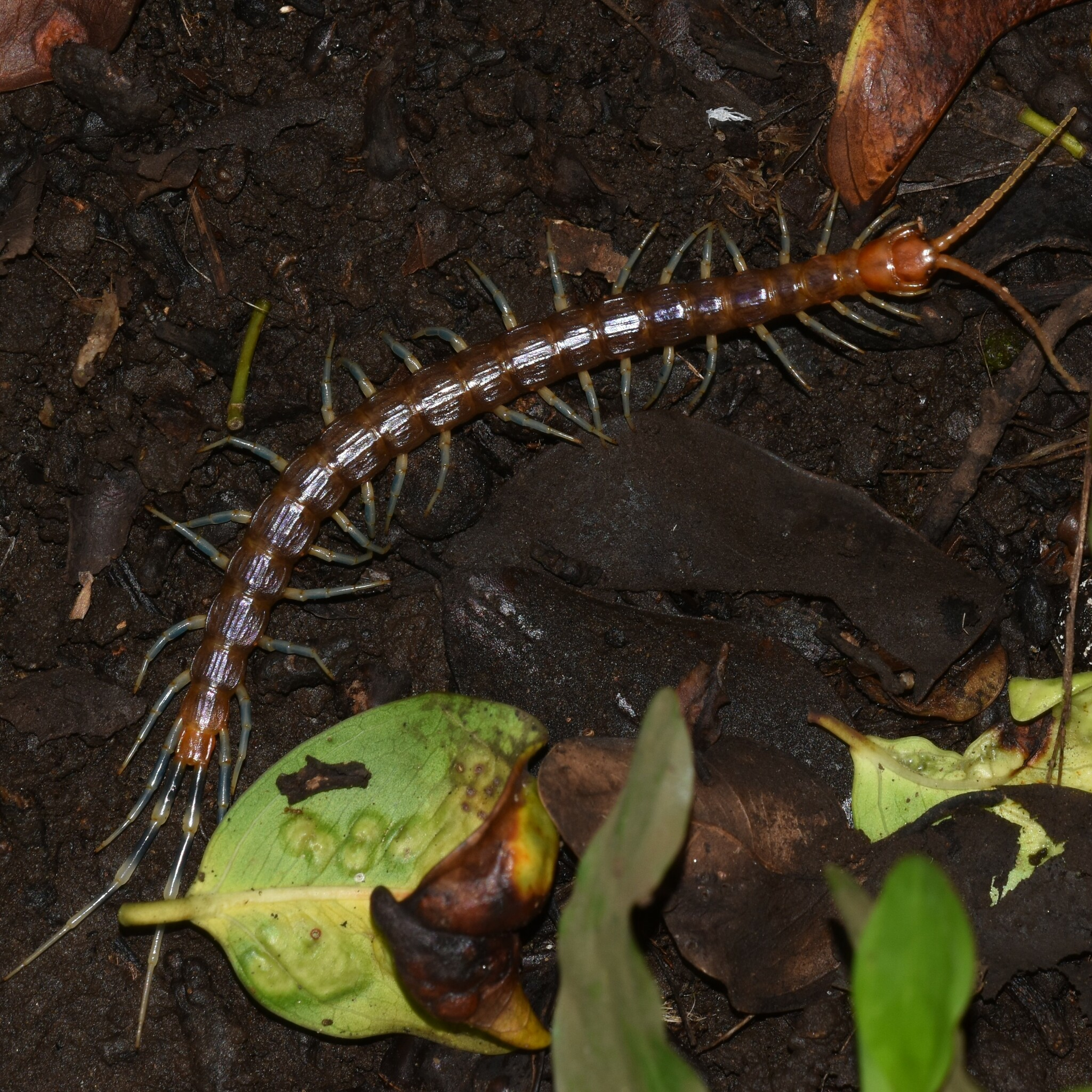

Scientific classification
- Kingdom: Animalia
- Phylum: Arthropoda
- Subphylum: Myriapoda
- Class: Chilopoda
- Order: Scolopendromorpha
- Family: Scolopendridae
- Genus: Otostigmus
- Species: O. scaber

Binomial name
- Otostigmus scaber Porat, 1876

Synonyms
- Otostigmus carinatus Porat 1876; Otostigmus malayanus Chamberlin 1914; Branchiotrema multicarinatum Kohlrausch 1878; Otostigmus striatus Takakuwa, 1940; Otostigmus carinatus insulare Haase, 1887; Otostigmus striatus porteri Dobroruka, 1960; Otostigmus striatus striatus Takakuwa, 1940

= Otostigmus scaber =

Species of centipede

Otostigmus scaber is a species of centipedes in the family Scolopendridae. The species is distributed in a broad range from Réunion and Australia's Cocos (Keeling) Islands in the Indian Ocean, through South Asian countries to Taiwan, Vietnam and Hawaii.

It was first described by Swedish zoologist Carl Oscar von Porat in 1876 and is classified in the genus Otostigmus, within the order Scolopendromorpha. Its recorded synonyms include Otostigmus carinatus, Otostigmus malayanus and Branchiotrema multicarinatum. The species has a broad geographical distribution, extending from Réunion in the Indian Ocean and the Cocos (Keeling) Islands to South and Southeast Asia, Taiwan and the Hawaiian Islands. Recorded locations include the Andaman and Nicobar Islands, Bhutan, Cambodia, Myanmar, Peninsular Malaysia, Sri Lanka, Sumatra, Thailand and Vietnam. Its original type locality is China.

== Taxonomy ==
Otostigmus scaber is the namesake of the scaber species group within the nominate subgenus Otostigmus (Otostigmus). Another name from Porat's 1876 paper, O. carinatus, was placed in synonymy with O. scaber by Kraepelin in 1903. Later authors have cautioned that tergal keels and spinules vary within and between species of this subgenus, so they should not be used alone to identify species.

Species of the scaber group are separated from other Otostigmus (Otostigmus) groups by sharp tergal keels beginning at least from tergite 7. O. scaber has antennae of 21 articles, with about 2 to 2.5 basal articles hairless on the dorsal surface. The ultimate leg prefemur bears a single row of ventrolateral spines, and the coxopleural process of leg-bearing segment 21 carries a dorsal spine. The species has also been recorded from mainland China (Fuzhou, Fujian) and Laos, and specimens from both areas have been sequenced for phylogenetic studies of Otostigmus.
