= Otostigmus politus =

Scientific classification
- Kingdom: Animalia
- Phylum: Arthropoda
- Subphylum: Myriapoda
- Class: Chilopoda
- Order: Scolopendromorpha
- Family: Scolopendridae
- Genus: Otostigmus
- Species: O. politus

Binomial name
- Otostigmus politus Karsch, 1881

Species of centipede

Otostigmus politus is a species of centipede in the Scolopendridae family. It is found in Australia and Melanesia, and was first described in 1881 by German arachnologist Ferdinand Karsch.

== Distribution ==
The species occurs in northern and eastern coastal Queensland as well as in New Guinea and the Solomon Islands.

== Behaviour ==
The centipedes are solitary terrestrial predators that inhabit plant litter, soil and rotting wood.
