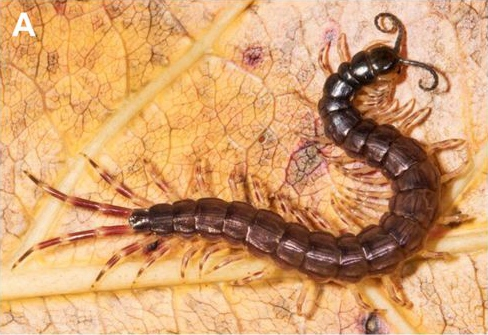
- Otostigmus (Parotostigmus) pococki

Scientific classification
- Kingdom: Animalia
- Phylum: Arthropoda
- Subphylum: Myriapoda
- Class: Chilopoda
- Order: Scolopendromorpha
- Family: Scolopendridae
- Tribe: Otostigmini
- Genus: Otostigmus; Porat, 1876

Type species
- Otostigmus carinatus Porat, 1876

Subgenera
- Otostigmus (Dactylotergitius) Verhoeff, 1937; Otostigmus (Otostigmus) Porat, 1876; Otostigmus (Parotostigmus) Pocock, 1895

Synonyms
- Branchiotrema Köhlrausch, 1878

= Otostigmus =

Genus of centipedes

Otostigmus is a genus of centipedes in the family Scolopendridae. It was first described by Swedish naturalist Carl Oscar von Porat in 1876. The genus as a whole comprises around 157 species, found primarily in the Neotropics.

== Species ==
=== Subgenus (Otostigmus) ===
- Otostigmus aculeatus Haase, 1887
- Otostigmus amballae Chamberlin, 1913
- Otostigmus angusticeps Pocock, 1898
- Otostigmus armatus Attems, 1953
- Otostigmus asper Haase, 1887
- Otostigmus astenus (Kohlrausch, 1878)
- Otostigmus ateles Chamberlin, 1920
- Otostigmus australianus Attems, 1930
- Otostigmus beroni Lewis, 2001
- Otostigmus brevidentatus Verhoeff, 1937
- Otostigmus burnmurdochi Gravely, 1912
- Otostigmus celebensis Attems, 1934
- Otostigmus ceylonicus Haase, 1887
- Otostigmus chiltoni Archey, 1921
- Otostigmus cuneiventris Porat, 1893
- Otostigmus dammermani Chamberlin, 1944
- Otostigmus feae Pocock, 1891
- Otostigmus fossuliger Verhoeff, 1937
- Otostigmus foveolatus Verhoeff, 1937
- Otostigmus geophilinus Haase, 1887
- Otostigmus gravelyi (Jangi and Dass, 1984)
- Otostigmus kashmiranus Lewis, 1992
- Otostigmus lawrencei Dobroruka, 1968
- Otostigmus longicornis (Tömösväry, 1885)
- Otostigmus martensi Lewis, 1992
- Otostigmus metallicus Haase, 1887
- Otostigmus mians Chamberlin, 1930
- Otostigmus multidens Haase, 1887
- Otostigmus nemorensis Silvestri, 1895
- Otostigmus niasensis Silvestri, 1895
- Otostigmus noduliger Verhoeff, 1937
- Otostigmus nudus Pocock, 1890
- Otostigmus oatesi Kraepelin, 1903
- Otostigmus olivaceus Attems, 1934
- Otostigmus orientalis Porat, 1876
- Otostigmus pahangiensis Verhoeff, 1937
- Otostigmus pamuanus Chamberlin, 1920
- Otostigmus politus Karsch, 1881
- Otostigmus poonamae Khanna and Tripathi, 1986
- Otostigmus proponens Chamberlin, 1920
- Otostigmus punctiventer (Tömösväry, 1885)
- Otostigmus reservatus Schileyko, 1995
- Otostigmus ruficeps Pocock, 1890
- Otostigmus rugulosus Porat, 1876
- Otostigmus scaber Porat, 1876
- Otostigmus seychellarum Attems, 1900
- Otostigmus sinicolens Chamberlin, 1930
- Otostigmus spinicaudus (Newport, 1844)
- Otostigmus spinosus Porat, 1876
- Otostigmus striolatus Verhoeff, 1937
- Otostigmus sucki Kraepelin, 1903
- Otostigmus sulcipes Verhoeff, 1937
- Otostigmus sumatranus Haase, 1887
- Otostigmus sutteri Würmli, 1972
- Otostigmus taeniatus Pocock, 1896
- Otostigmus tanganjikus Verhoeff, 1941
- Otostigmus telus Chamberlin, 1939
- Otostigmus trisulcatus Verhoeff, 1937
- Otostigmus tuberculatus (Kohlrausch, 1878)
- Otostigmus voprosus Schileyko, 1992

=== Subgenus (Dactylotergitius) ===
- Otostigmus caudatus Brölemann, 1902
- Otostigmus cavalcantii Bücherl, 1939

=== Subgenus (Parotostigmus) ===
- Otostigmus amazonae Chamberlin, 1914
- Otostigmus beckeri Chagas Jr., 2012
- Otostigmus buergeri Attems, 1903
- Otostigmus calcanus Chamberlin, 1944
- Otostigmus caraibicus Kraepelin, 1903
- Otostigmus carbonelli Bücherl, 1939
- Otostigmus clavifer Chamberlin, 1921
- Otostigmus demelloi Verhoeff, 1937
- Otostigmus denticulatus (Pocock, 1896)
- Otostigmus diminutus Bücherl, 1946
- Otostigmus diringshofeni Bücherl, 1969
- Otostigmus dolosus Attems, 1928
- Otostigmus expectus Bücherl, 1959
- Otostigmus fuellerborni Kraepelin, 1903
- Otostigmus gemmifer Attems, 1928
- Otostigmus giupponii Chagas Jr., 2012
- Otostigmus goeldii Brölemann, 1898
- Otostigmus gymnopus Silvestri, 1898
- Otostigmus inermipes Porat, 1893
- Otostigmus inermis Porat, 1876
- Otostigmus insignis Kraepelin, 1903
- Otostigmus kivuensis (Dobroruka, 1968)
- Otostigmus lanceolatus Chagas Jr., 2012
- Otostigmus lavanus Chamberlin, 1957
- Otostigmus leior Chamberlin, 1955
- Otostigmus limbatus Meinert, 1886
- Otostigmus mesethus Chamberlin, 1957
- Otostigmus muticus Karsch, 1888
- Otostigmus occidentalis Meinert, 1886
- Otostigmus parvior Chamberlin, 1957
- Otostigmus pococki Kraepelin, 1903
- Otostigmus productus Karsch, 1884
- Otostigmus saltensis Coscarón, 1959
- Otostigmus salticus Schileyko, Iorio and Coulis, 2018
- Otostigmus scabricauda (Humbert and Saussure, 1870)
- Otostigmus schoutedeni (Dobroruka, 1968)
- Otostigmus silvestrii Kraepelin, 1903
- Otostigmus spiculifer Pocock, 1893
- Otostigmus suitus Chamberlin, 1914
- Otostigmus sulcatus Meinert, 1886
- Otostigmus tibialis Brölemann, 1902
- Otostigmus tidius Chamberlin, 1914
- Otostigmus troglodytes Ribaut, 1914
- Otostigmus volcanus Chamberlin, 1955

=== Taxa with uncertain position ===
- Otostigmus kervillei Karsch, 1888

== Etymology ==
The genus name comes from Ancient Greek οὖς (oûs), meaning 'ear', and στίγμα (stígma), meaning 'brand'.
