= Ödön Tömösváry =

Hungarian zoologist

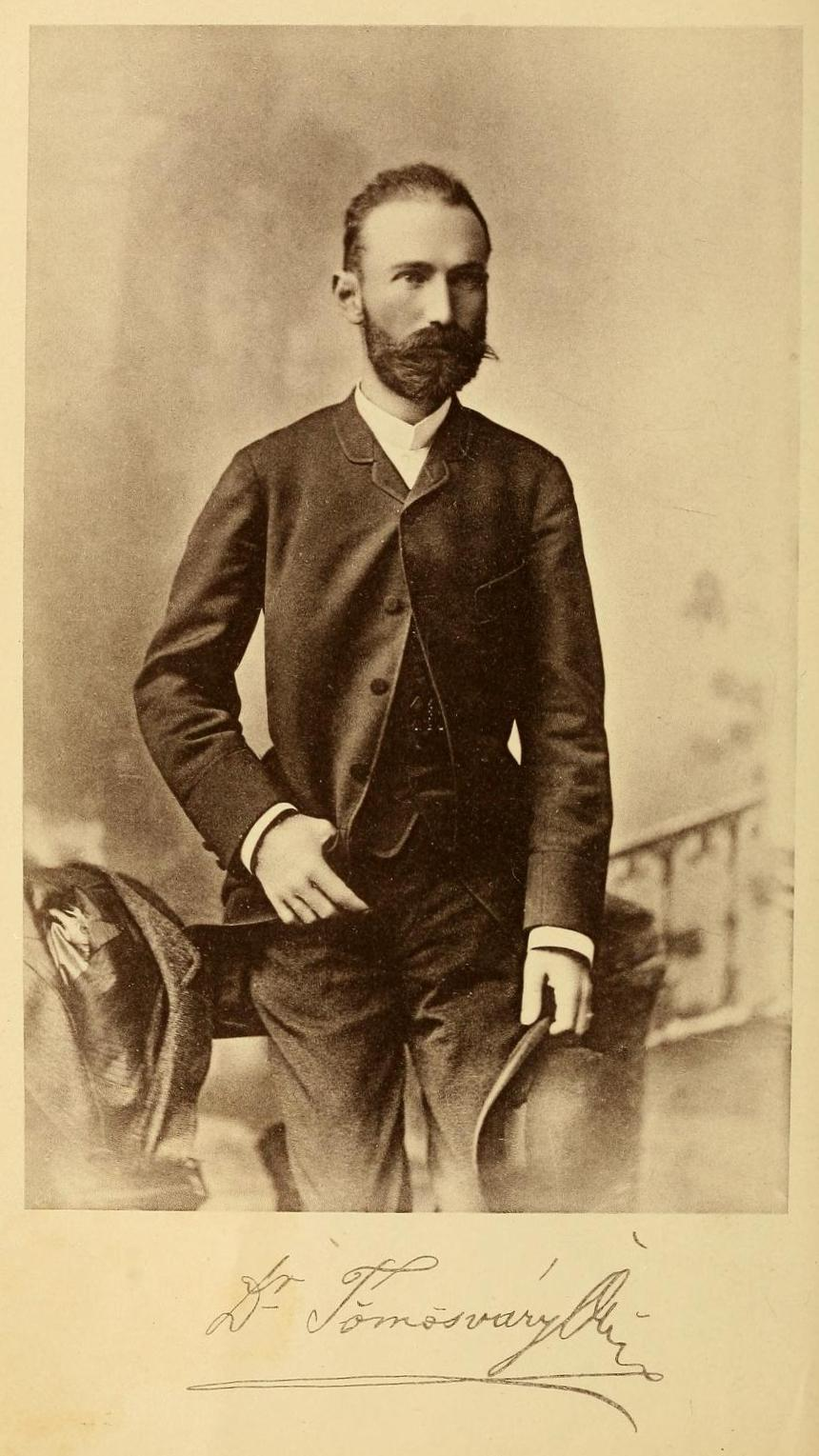
Ödön Tömösváry

Ödön Tömösváry (Edmund Tömösváry, October 12, 1852, in Magyaró – August 15, 1884, in Déva) was a Hungarian naturalist, myriapodologist and entomologist. In 1883 he made the seminal description of peculiar sensory organ of myriapods, known today as the temporal organ or organ of Tömösváry.

He attended secondary school in Kolozsvár and university of Selmecbánya. Tömösváry completed his university studies in Budapest in 1881, and his doctoral thesis concerned the anatomical structure of the respiratory organ of Scutigera coleoptrata. In his scientific career Tömösváry wrote 57 papers. When he arrived in the Lower Danube region to study the Columbatch fly (Simuliidae) he became sick with tuberculosis. Because of this continuing illness he wasn't able to work as a zoologist and in the last year of his life he worked as a teacher at Kassa. He died on August 15, 1884, in Déva.

Tömösváry described 32 new myriapod species: 10 of Diplopoda, 19 of Chilopoda, 2 of Pauropoda, and one Symphyla species. He introduced two new genera, Edentistoma Tömösváry, 1882 = Anodontastoma Tömösváry, 1882 and Trachypauropus Tömösváry, 1882.
