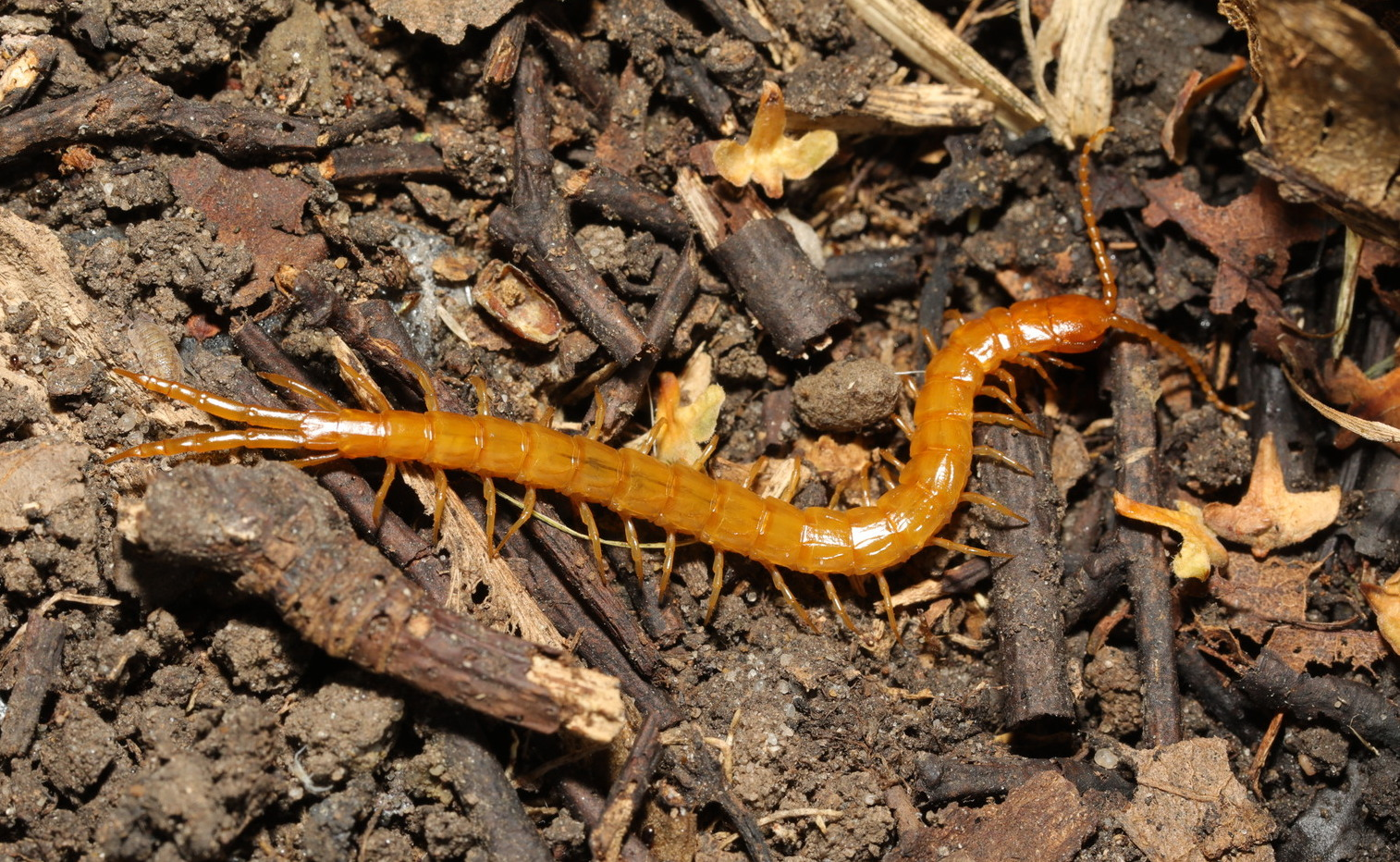

Scientific classification
- Kingdom: Animalia
- Phylum: Arthropoda
- Subphylum: Myriapoda
- Class: Chilopoda
- Order: Scolopendromorpha
- Family: Cryptopidae
- Genus: Cryptops
- Species: C. anomalans

Binomial name
- Cryptops anomalans (Newport, 1844)

= Cryptops anomalans =

Species of centipede

Cryptops anomalans, the anomalous cryptops, is a centipede in the genus Cryptops that is mainly distributed in Europe. It can reach a length of 50 millimeters and is one of the largest species of this genus. Cryptops anomalans can easily be confused with its two Central European congeners C. hortensis and C. parisi. However, it can be identified through the characteristic ‘X’ suture on the first tergite.

== Distribution ==
Cryptops anomalans is distributed throughout Central Europe (except Poland) and Albania, Belgium, Bosnia-Herzegovina, Bulgaria, Croatia, Czech Republic, France, Great Britain, Greece, Italy, Macedonia, Montenegro, Netherlands, Serbia, Spain, Turkey and Ukraine. It was also found in Algeria, Morocco, Tunisia and parts of Canada.
