= Scolopocryptops melanostomus =

Scientific classification
- Kingdom: Animalia
- Phylum: Arthropoda
- Subphylum: Myriapoda
- Class: Chilopoda
- Order: Scolopendromorpha
- Family: Scolopocryptopidae
- Genus: Scolopocryptops
- Species: S. melanostomus

Binomial name
- Scolopocryptops melanostomus Newport, 1845

Synonyms
- Otocryptops aculeatus Attems, 1897; Scolopocryptops boholiensis Kohlrausch, 1881; Scolopocryptops geophilicornis Tömösváry, 1885; Scolopocryptops longiceps Pocock, 1891; Scolopocryptops luzonicus Kohlrausch, 1879

Species of centipede

Scolopocryptops melanostomus is a species of centipede in the Scolopocryptopidae family. It was described in 1845 by British entomologist George Newport.

== Distribution ==
The species has a cosmopolitan distribution. The type locality is Saint Vincent, West Indies.
