= Cryptops haasei =

Scientific classification
- Kingdom: Animalia
- Phylum: Arthropoda
- Subphylum: Myriapoda
- Class: Chilopoda
- Order: Scolopendromorpha
- Family: Cryptopidae
- Genus: Cryptops
- Species: C. haasei

Binomial name
- Cryptops haasei Attems, 1903

Synonyms
- Cryptops sulcatus Haase, 1887

Species of centipede

Cryptops haasei is a species of centipede in the Cryptopidae family. It is native to Australia and was first described in 1903 by Austrian myriapodologist Carl Attems.

== Distribution ==
The species has been recorded from Queensland, New South Wales and Western Australia.
