= Cryptops lamprethus =

Scientific classification
- Kingdom: Animalia
- Phylum: Arthropoda
- Subphylum: Myriapoda
- Class: Chilopoda
- Order: Scolopendromorpha
- Family: Cryptopidae
- Genus: Cryptops
- Species: C. lamprethus

Binomial name
- Cryptops lamprethus Chamberlin, 1920

Synonyms
- Cryptops pelorus Archey, 1921; Cryptops tokatea Archey, 1922

Species of centipede

Cryptops lamprethus is a species of centipede in the Cryptopidae family. It is endemic to New Zealand. It was first described in 1920 by American biologist Ralph Vary Chamberlin.

== Distribution ==
The species occurs in the North Island. The type locality is Taumarunui in the Ruapehu District.
