= Cryptops arapuni =

Scientific classification
- Kingdom: Animalia
- Phylum: Arthropoda
- Subphylum: Myriapoda
- Class: Chilopoda
- Order: Scolopendromorpha
- Family: Cryptopidae
- Genus: Cryptops
- Species: C. arapuni

Binomial name
- Cryptops arapuni Archey, 1922

Species of centipede

Cryptops arapuni is a species of centipede in the Cryptopidae family. It is endemic to New Zealand. It was first described in 1922 by New Zealand zoologist Gilbert Archey.

== Distribution ==
The species occurs in the North Island. The type locality is Arapuni in the South Waikato District.
