= Scolopocryptops aberrans =

Scientific classification
- Kingdom: Animalia
- Phylum: Arthropoda
- Subphylum: Myriapoda
- Class: Chilopoda
- Order: Scolopendromorpha
- Family: Scolopocryptopidae
- Genus: Scolopocryptops
- Species: S. aberrans

Binomial name
- Scolopocryptops aberrans (Chamberlin, 1920)

Synonyms
- Otocryptops aberrans Haase, 1887

Species of centipede

Scolopocryptops aberrans is a species of centipede in the Scolopocryptopidae family. It was described in 1920 by American myriapodologist Ralph Vary Chamberlin, although his descriptions are very short and have no illustrations, which made identification very hard; later descriptions alleviated this issue.

As a member of the Scolopocryptopinae family, Scolopocryptops aberrans is blind and has 23 pairs of legs. The body of the centipede is 43-55 mm long and orange-yellow in colour; the cephalic plate is darker; it is rectangular and smooth except for little puncta. Scolopocryptops aberrans has 17 antennomeres: the first two have several long reddish bristles and no short ones; the third antennomere is about as long as the first two combined and has short bristles; the rest have short golden bristles. Leg pairs 1 to 19 have two tibial spurs; the 20th pair has one spur; the other legs have none. Forcipular coxosternum is mostly straight with longitudinal and transversal sutures on stronly chitinised tooth plates. Smooth tergites and sternites, no spiracles on the seventh pedal segment of the pleuron.

Scolopocryptops aberrans is closest to Scolopocryptops ferrugineus but can be easily distinguished from it by the distribution of the complete paramedian sutures on the tergites: in S. aberrans, they are present on the 6th (7th) to 19th (20th) tergites while in S. ferrugineus, they appear on the 3rd (4th) to the 20th; another difference is the tibial spurs: in S. aberrans, two spurs can be found on legs 1-19 while in S. ferrugineus they grow on legs 1 to 18; the last indication is the dorsomedial spinous process, which is shorter in S. aberrans.

== Distribution ==
The species occurs in Fiji; all known sightings occurred in localities in the north and east of the Viti Levu island. The type locality is Veisari, Nausori.
