= Scolopocryptops verdescens =

Scientific classification
- Kingdom: Animalia
- Phylum: Arthropoda
- Subphylum: Myriapoda
- Class: Chilopoda
- Order: Scolopendromorpha
- Family: Scolopocryptopidae
- Genus: Scolopocryptops
- Species: S. verdescens

Binomial name
- Scolopocryptops verdescens (Chamberlin, 1921)

Synonyms
- Otocryptops verdescens Haase, 1887

Species of centipede

Scolopocryptops verdescens is a species of centipede in the Scolopocryptopidae family. It was described in 1920 by American myriapodologist Ralph Vary Chamberlin.

== Distribution ==
The species occurs in Fiji. The type locality is Nasoqo.
