= Cryptops relictus =

Scientific classification
- Kingdom: Animalia
- Phylum: Arthropoda
- Subphylum: Myriapoda
- Class: Chilopoda
- Order: Scolopendromorpha
- Family: Cryptopidae
- Genus: Cryptops
- Species: C. relictus

Binomial name
- Cryptops relictus Chamberlin, 1920

Species of centipede

Cryptops relictus is a species of centipede in the Cryptopidae family. It was described in 1920 by American myriapodologist Ralph Vary Chamberlin.

== Distribution ==
The species occurs in Fiji. The type locality is Nagasu.
