= Cryptops notandus =

Scientific classification
- Kingdom: Animalia
- Phylum: Arthropoda
- Subphylum: Myriapoda
- Class: Chilopoda
- Order: Scolopendromorpha
- Family: Cryptopidae
- Genus: Cryptops
- Species: C. notandus

Binomial name
- Cryptops notandus Silvestri, 1939

Species of centipede

Cryptops notandus is a species of centipede in the Cryptopidae family. It was described in 1939 by Italian entomologist Filippo Silvestri.

== Distribution ==
The species occurs in American Samoa and the Marquesas Islands of French Polynesia. The type locality is the Hane Valley, Hanatakeo, on the island of Ua Huka.
