= Cryptops nanus =

Scientific classification
- Kingdom: Animalia
- Phylum: Arthropoda
- Subphylum: Myriapoda
- Class: Chilopoda
- Order: Scolopendromorpha
- Family: Cryptopidae
- Genus: Cryptops
- Species: C. nanus

Binomial name
- Cryptops nanus Attems, 1938

Species of centipede

Cryptops nanus is a species of centipede in the Cryptopidae family. It was described in 1938 by Austrian myriapodologist Carl Attems.

== Distribution ==
The species occurs in the Hawaiian Islands. The type locality is Honolulu.
