= Cryptops spinipes =

Scientific classification
- Kingdom: Animalia
- Phylum: Arthropoda
- Subphylum: Myriapoda
- Class: Chilopoda
- Order: Scolopendromorpha
- Family: Cryptopidae
- Genus: Cryptops
- Species: C. spinipes

Binomial name
- Cryptops spinipes Pocock, 1891

Synonyms
- Cryptops setosus Pocock, 1891; Cryptops zealandicus Chamberlin, 1920

Species of centipede

Cryptops spinipes, the spine-footed cryptops, is a species of centipede in the Cryptopidae family. It is native to Oceania and was first described in 1891 by British zoologist Reginald Innes Pocock.

== Distribution ==
The species’ range includes eastern Australia, New Zealand, Fiji and the Solomon Islands.

== Behaviour ==
The centipedes are solitary terrestrial predators that inhabit plant litter, soil and rotting wood.
