= Paracryptops breviunguis =

Scientific classification
- Kingdom: Animalia
- Phylum: Arthropoda
- Subphylum: Myriapoda
- Class: Chilopoda
- Order: Scolopendromorpha
- Family: Cryptopidae
- Genus: Paracryptops
- Species: P. breviunguis

Binomial name
- Paracryptops breviunguis Silvestri, 1895

Species of centipede

Paracryptops breviunguis, the short cryptops, is a species of centipede in the Cryptopidae family. It was described in 1895 by Italian myriapodologist Filippo Silvestri.

== Distribution ==
The species occurs in New Guinea. The type locality is Astrolabe Bay, Papua New Guinea.
