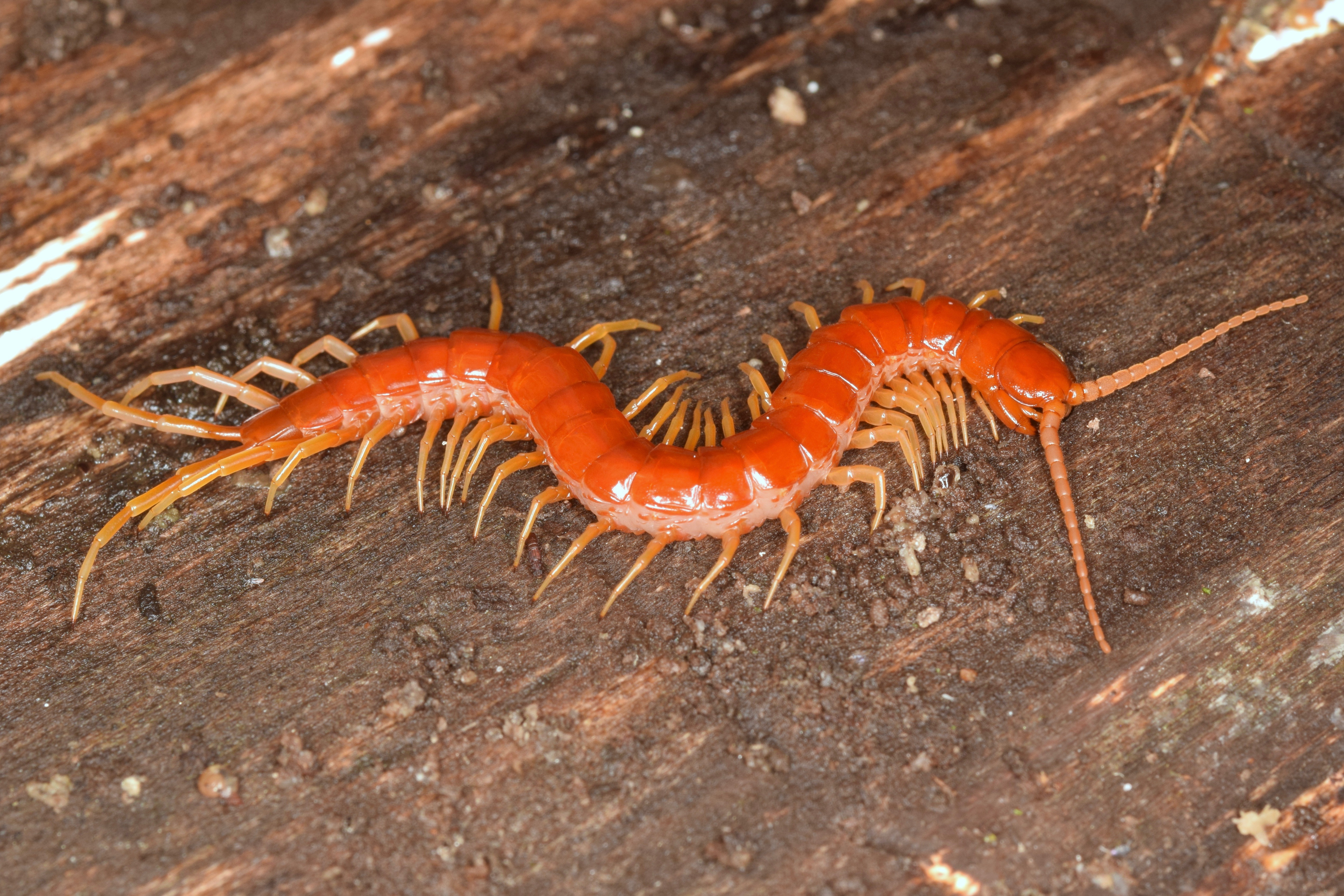
- Specimen from Georgia, United States on wood surface

Scientific classification
- Kingdom: Animalia
- Phylum: Arthropoda
- Subphylum: Myriapoda
- Class: Chilopoda
- Order: Scolopendromorpha
- Family: Scolopocryptopidae
- Genus: Scolopocryptops
- Species: S. sexspinosus

Binomial name
- Scolopocryptops sexspinosus Say, 1821

Synonyms
- Cryptops sexspinosa Say, 1821; Otocryptops punctatus Pocock, 1891; Scolopocryptops georgicus Meinert, 1886; Scolopocryptops punctatus Pocock, 1891

= Scolopocryptops sexspinosus =

Species of centipede

Scolopocryptops sexspinosus, the eastern red centipede, is a species of centipede in the family Scolopocryptopidae. This common centipede is found in eastern North America. This species is large, reaching about 7 cm in length, and venomous. These centipedes move swiftly and can inflict a painful bite.

== Taxonomy ==
This species was first described in 1821 by the American zoologist Thomas Say. He originally described this centipede as a new species in the genus Cryptops. In 1845, the English zoologist George Newport placed this species in the genus Scolopocryptops instead.

== Distribution ==
This species is widespread across eastern North America from Florida and the Gulf Coast to Ontario in Canada. This range extends up the East Coast into New England and as far west as eastern Texas and Nebraska. This centipede is found from sea level to as high as 1,950 m (6,400 ft) above sea level. In Canada, this species is known only from the Niagara Gorge. Specimens found in British Columbia initially thought to be S. sexspinosus were later identified as specimens of S. spinicaudus.

== Morphology ==
The eastern red centipede is relatively large and can attain a length of 69 mm. This species is usually orange or reddish-orange, although southeastern specimens may be browner. Like other species in the family Scolopocryptopidae, this species features 23 leg-bearing segments, with one pair of legs on each segment, and lacks ocelli and is thus blind.

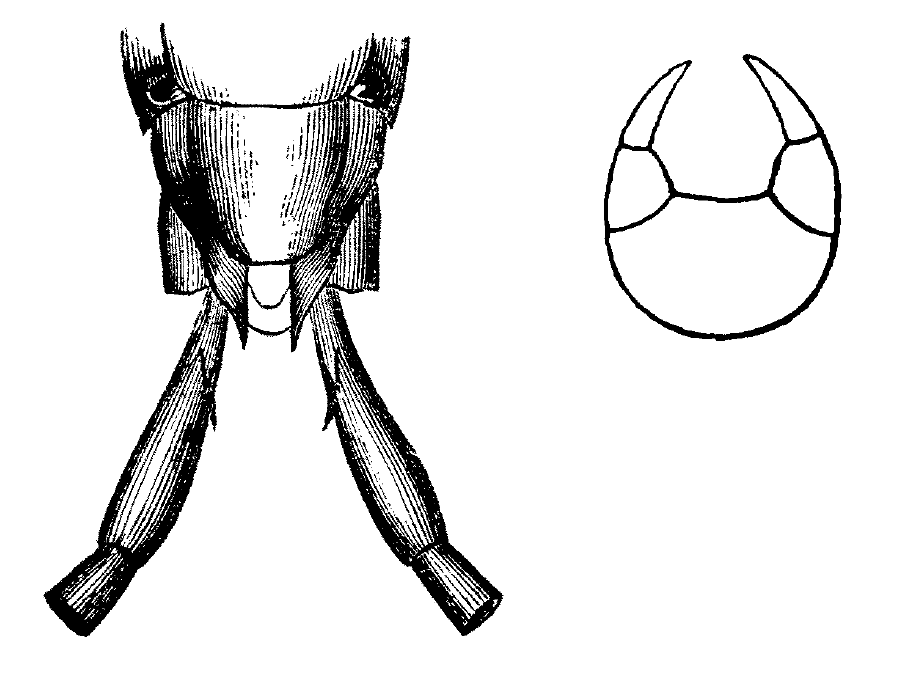
The posterior (left, with ultimate legs) and the fangs (right) of Scolopocryptops sexspinosus

The antennae feature very short but dense hair, with the first antenna segment (antennomere) less hirsute (hairy) than more distal segments. The second trunk segment behind the head is the shortest, and the fourth and then the sixth segments are the next shortest. The tergites (dorsal plates) feature a pair of longitudinal grooves that are each incomplete and confined to the posterior part of the tergite. The ultimate legs are elongated, and each leg features two spines near the base: one conspicuous and nearly triangular spine on the ventral side of the base and another smaller spine on the inner side nearer the middle of the most basal segment of each leg.

== Ecology, diet, and habitats ==
The eastern red centipede occurs in a wide variety of habitats but often hides under decaying logs or leaf litter and is thus difficult to find. In the summer, females can be found in rotting wood or under bark, coiled around their brood of eggs or recently hatched young to protect them from predators. This species feeds on spiders, insects, earthworms, and smaller centipedes. Adults are active throughout the year. This centipede can thermoregulate and maintain performance across a broad range of temperatures.

== Phylogeny ==
A study of DNA extracted from specimens of this species collected from the southern Appalachian Mountains finds that S. sexspinosus is a species complex. This genetic evidence indicates that the population sampled includes two deeply divergent clades, a northern lineage with a range extending to West Virginia and Virginia, and a more southern lineage with a range extending to Georgia and South Carolina. The ranges for these two lineages overlap in the William B. Bankhead National Forest in Alabama as well as in the Great Smoky Mountains National Park in Tennessee and North Carolina. The mitochondrial divergence between these two lineages is comparable to the divergence between different species in the genus Scolopocryptops, suggesting the presence of cryptic species.
