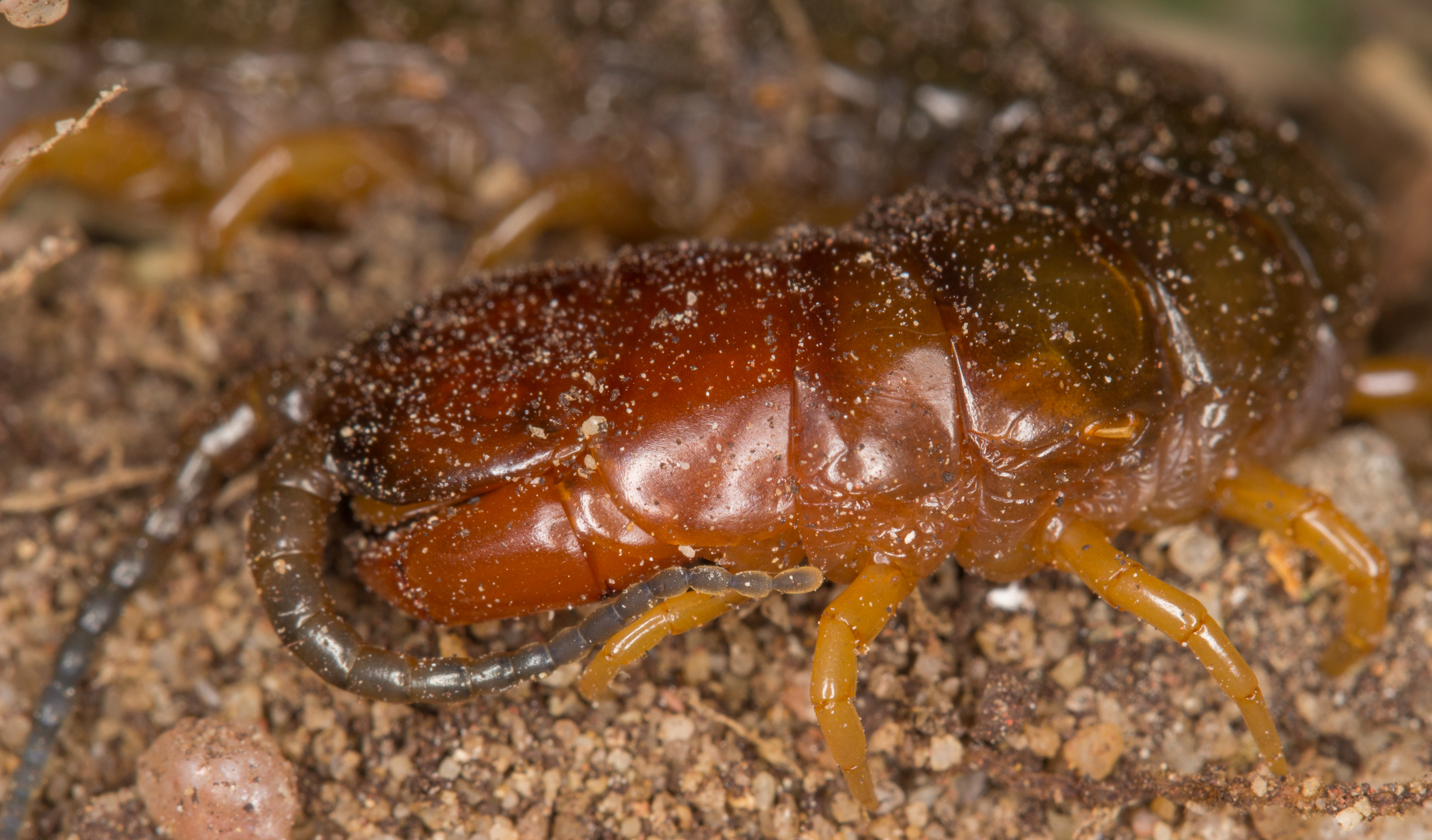

Scientific classification
- Kingdom: Animalia
- Phylum: Arthropoda
- Subphylum: Myriapoda
- Class: Chilopoda
- Order: Scolopendromorpha
- Family: Cryptopidae
- Genus: Cryptops
- Species: C. megalopora

Binomial name
- Cryptops megalopora Haase, 1887

= Cryptops megalopora =

Species of centipede

Cryptops megalopora is a species of centipede in the Cryptopidae family. It is native to Australia and New Zealand and was first described in 1887 by German entomologist Erich Haase.

== Distribution ==
The species’ range includes New Zealand and the Australian island of Tasmania.

== Behaviour ==
The centipedes are solitary terrestrial predators that inhabit plant litter, soil and rotting wood.
