= Cryptops rouxi =

Scientific classification
- Kingdom: Animalia
- Phylum: Arthropoda
- Subphylum: Myriapoda
- Class: Chilopoda
- Order: Scolopendromorpha
- Family: Cryptopidae
- Genus: Cryptops
- Species: C. rouxi

Binomial name
- Cryptops rouxi Ribaut, 1923

Species of centipede

Cryptops rouxi is a species of centipede in the Cryptopidae family. It is endemic to New Caledonia, a French overseas territory in Melanesia. It was first described in 1923 by French entomologist Henri Ribaut.

== Distribution ==
The species occurs on the main island of Grande Terre. The type locality is the commune of Koné.
