= Cryptops neocaledonicus =

Scientific classification
- Kingdom: Animalia
- Phylum: Arthropoda
- Subphylum: Myriapoda
- Class: Chilopoda
- Order: Scolopendromorpha
- Family: Cryptopidae
- Genus: Cryptops
- Species: C. neocaledonicus

Binomial name
- Cryptops neocaledonicus Ribaut, 1923

Species of centipede

Cryptops neocaledonicus, the New Caledonian cryptops, is a species of centipede in the Cryptopidae family. It was first described in 1923 by French entomologist Henri Ribaut.

== Distribution ==
The species occurs on the main island of New Caledonia, Grande Terre; the type locality is Mont Panié. It has also been recorded from Guadeloupe and the United States Virgin Islands in the Caribbean, as well as from Peru and Namibia.

=== Subspecies ===
- Cryptops neocaledonicus muchmorei Lewis, 1989
- Cryptops neocaledonicus neocaledonicus Ribaut, 1923
