= Cryptops dilagus =

Scientific classification
- Kingdom: Animalia
- Phylum: Arthropoda
- Subphylum: Myriapoda
- Class: Chilopoda
- Order: Scolopendromorpha
- Family: Cryptopidae
- Genus: Cryptops
- Species: C. dilagus

Binomial name
- Cryptops dilagus Archey, 1921

Synonyms
- Cryptops akaroa Archey, 1921; Cryptops algidus Archey, 1921; Cryptops ignivia Archey, 1921

Species of centipede

Cryptops dilagus is a species of centipede in the Cryptopidae family. It is endemic to New Zealand. It was first described in 1921 by New Zealand zoologist Gilbert Archey.

== Distribution ==
The species occurs in the South Island. The type locality is Mount Algidus in the western Canterbury Region.
