= Cryptops australis =

Scientific classification
- Kingdom: Animalia
- Phylum: Arthropoda
- Subphylum: Myriapoda
- Class: Chilopoda
- Order: Scolopendromorpha
- Family: Cryptopidae
- Genus: Cryptops
- Species: C. australis

Binomial name
- Cryptops australis Newport, 1845

Synonyms
- Cryptops galidus Archey, 1921

Species of centipede

Cryptops australis, the Australian cryptops, is a species of centipede in the Cryptopidae family. It was first described in 1845 by British entomologist George Newport. It occurs in Australia, New Zealand and Melanesia.

== Subspecies ==
- Cryptops australis africana Lawrence, 1955
- Cryptops australis australis Newport, 1845
- Cryptops australis kraepelini Attems, 1928

== Description ==
These small centipedes grow to about 3 cm in length. They inhabit wet forests, where they are found underneath and within rotting logs. Their colouration is orange-brown. They are blind and have 21 pairs of legs.
