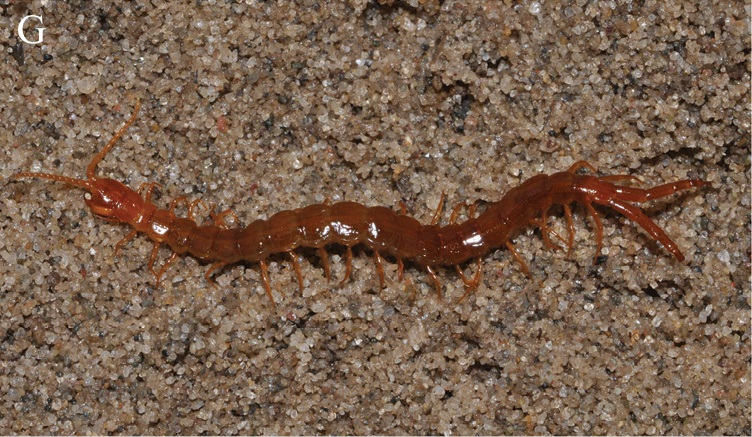

Scientific classification
- Kingdom: Animalia
- Phylum: Arthropoda
- Subphylum: Myriapoda
- Class: Chilopoda
- Order: Scolopendromorpha
- Family: Cryptopidae
- Genus: Cryptops
- Species: C. parisi

Binomial name
- Cryptops parisi Brolemann, 1920

= Cryptops parisi =

Species of centipede

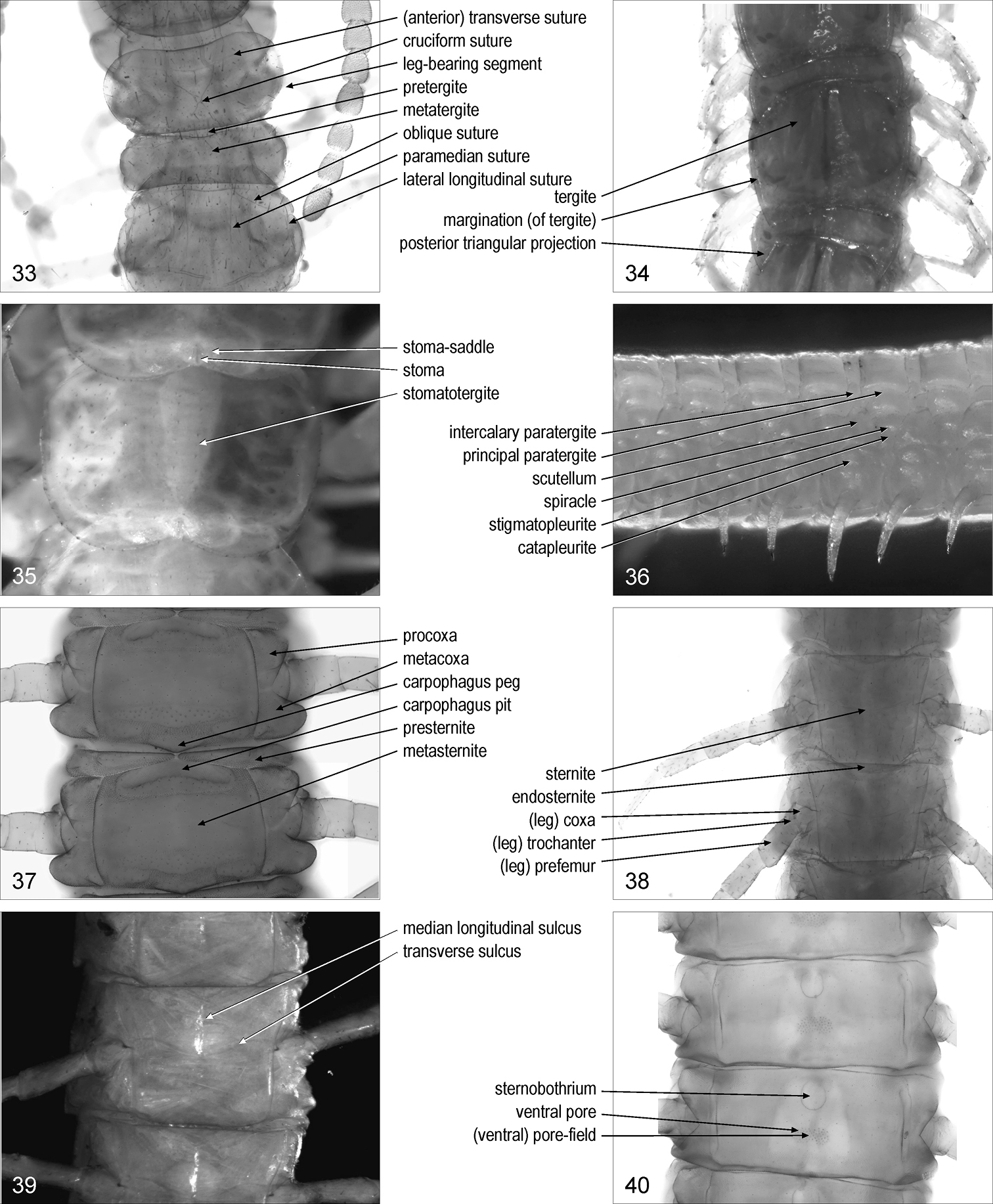
Comparative anatomy of various centipede species; image 38 is the intermediate part of the ventral trunk of Cryptops parisi.

Cryptops parisi is a species of centipede in the family Cryptopidae.

== Description and habitat ==
The species is 30 millimetres (1.2 in) long or more. It is identified by the closely spaced (often fused) teeth on the tibial and tarsal combs of the last legs. It lives under stones, logs and leaf litter. It is found in Great Britain, Ireland, central Europe and Canada.

== Life cycle ==
A 2020 study examining the development of the cephalic capsule and coxopleuron identified ten late post-embryonic stages in C. parisi's life cycle: three pre-adult stages (adolescens I, II, and III) and seven adult stages (one maturus junior stage, four maturus, and two maturus senior stages). There was no sexual dimorphism in these characteristics.
