= Paracryptops =

Scientific classification
- Kingdom: Animalia
- Phylum: Arthropoda
- Subphylum: Myriapoda
- Class: Chilopoda
- Order: Scolopendromorpha
- Family: Cryptopidae
- Genus: Paracryptops; Pocock, 1891

Type species
- Paracryptops weberi Pocock,1891

Genus of centipedes

Paracryptops is a genus of centipedes in the family Cryptopidae. It was described in 1891 by British myriapodologist Reginald Innes Pocock.

== Species ==
There are five valid species:

- Paracryptops breviunguis Silvestri, 1895
- Paracryptops indicus Silvestri, 1924
- Paracryptops inexpectus Chamberlin, 1914
- Paracryptops spinosus Jangi & Dass, 1978
- Paracryptops weberi Pocock, 1891
