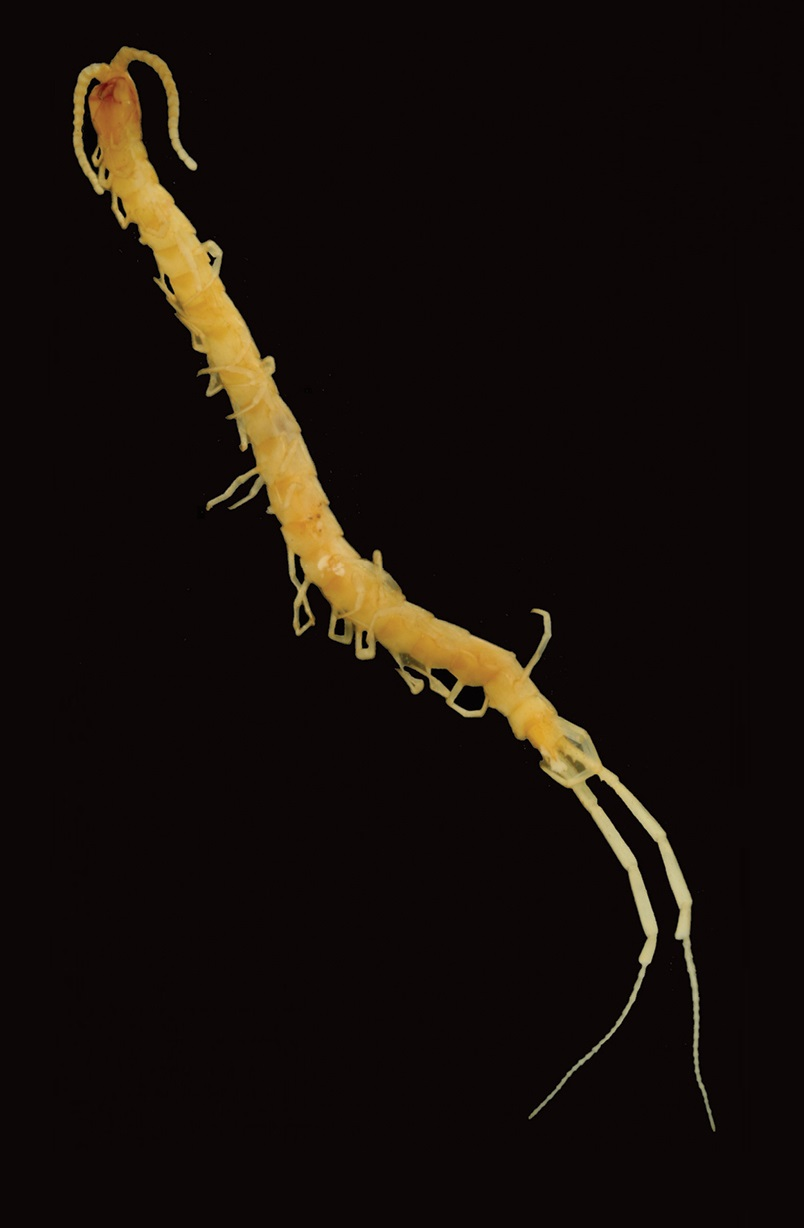
- Newportia stoevi specimen from Puerto Rico

Scientific classification
- Kingdom: Animalia
- Phylum: Arthropoda
- Subphylum: Myriapoda
- Class: Chilopoda
- Order: Scolopendromorpha
- Family: Scolopocryptopidae
- Genus: Newportia; Gervais, 1847

= Newportia =

Genus of centipedes

Newportia is a genus of scolopocryptopid centipedes. It has around 50 described species to date.

== Species ==
- Newportia adisi Schileyko & Minelli, 1999
- Newportia albana Chamberlin, 1957
- Newportia amazonica Brölemann, 1905
- Newportia andina González-Sponga, 1998
- Newportia atoyaca Chamberlin, 1943
- Newportia aureana Bücherl, 1942
- Newportia autanensis González-Sponga, 2001
- Newportia avilensis González-Sponga, 1998
- Newportia azteca Humbert & Saussure, 1869
- Newportia bauxita González-Sponga, 1998
- Newportia bielawaskii Matic, Negrea & Fundora-Martinez, 1977
- Newportia brevipes Pocock, 1891
- Newportia brevisegmentata González-Sponga, 2001
- Newportia cerrocopeyensis González-Sponga, 2001
- Newportia cubana Chamberlin, 1915
- Newportia dentata Pocock, 1890
- Newportia diagramma Chamberlin, 1921
- Newportia divergens Chamberlin, 1922
- Newportia ernsti Pocock, 1891
- Newportia fuhrmanni Raibaut, 1912
- Newportia guaiquinimensis González-Sponga, 2001
- Newportia heteropoda Chamberlin, 1918
- Newportia igneorata Kraus, 1955
- Newportia inflata González-Sponga, 2001
- Newportia isleanae González-Sponga, 2001
- Newportia lasia Chamberlin, 1921
- Newportia lata González-Sponga, 2001
- Newportia leptotarsis Negrea, Matic & Fundora-Martinez, 1973
- Newportia longitarsis (Newport, 1845)
- Newportia maxima Bücherl, 1942
- Newportia mexicana (Saussure, 1858)
- Newportia monticola Pocock, 1890
- Newportia morela Chamberlin, 1943
- Newportia mosquei González-Sponga, 2001
- Newportia oligopla Chamberlin, 1945
- Newportia oreina Chamberlin, 1915
- Newportia paraensis Chamberlin, 1914
- Newportia patavina Schileyko & Minelli, 1999
- Newportia pelaezi Chamberlin, 1942
- Newportia phoretha Chamberlin, 1950
- Newportia pijiguaoensis González-Sponga, 2001
- Newportia pilosa González-Sponga, 1998
- Newportia prima González-Sponga, 1998
- Newportia pusilla Pocock, 1893
- Newportia sabina Chamberlin, 1942
- Newportia sargenti Chamberlin, 1958
- Newportia simoni Brölemann, 1898
- Newportia spinipes Pocock, 1896
- Newportia stoevi Schileyko, 2013
- Newportia stolli (Pocock, 1896)
- Newportia tachirensis González-Sponga, 1998
- Newportia tepuiana González-Sponga, 2001
- Newportia tetraspinae González-Sponga, 2001
- Newportia troglobia Chagas & Shelley, 2003
- Newportia unguifer Chamberlin, 1921
- Newportia weyrauchi Chamberlin, 1955
