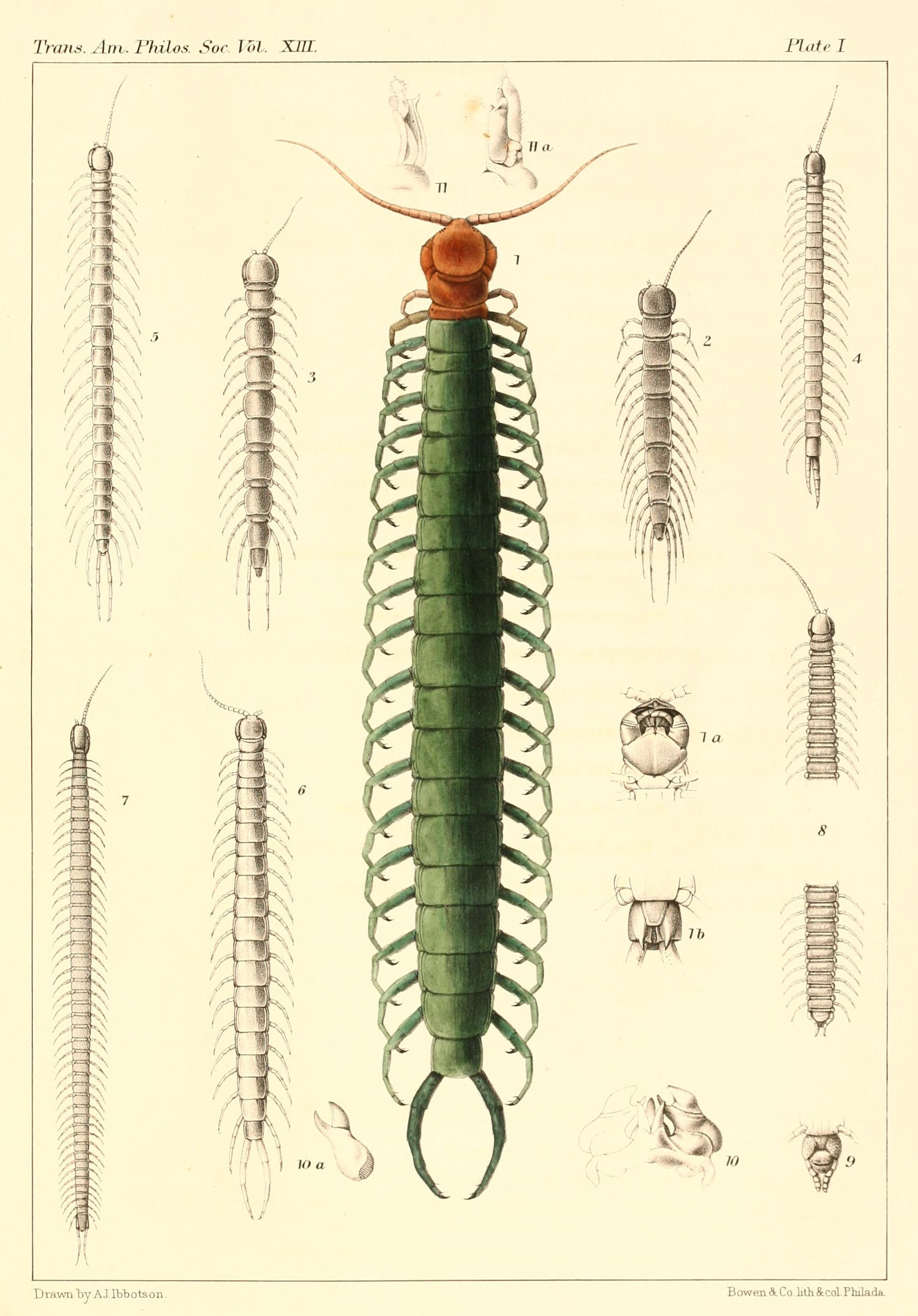

Scientific classification
- Kingdom: Animalia
- Phylum: Arthropoda
- Subphylum: Myriapoda
- Class: Chilopoda
- Order: Scolopendromorpha
- Family: Scolopocryptopidae
- Genus: Scolopocryptops; Newport, 1844

Species
- See text

= Scolopocryptops =

Genus of centipedes

Scolopocryptops is a genus of centipedes in the family Scolopocryptopidae. There are over 20 described species in Scolopocryptops.

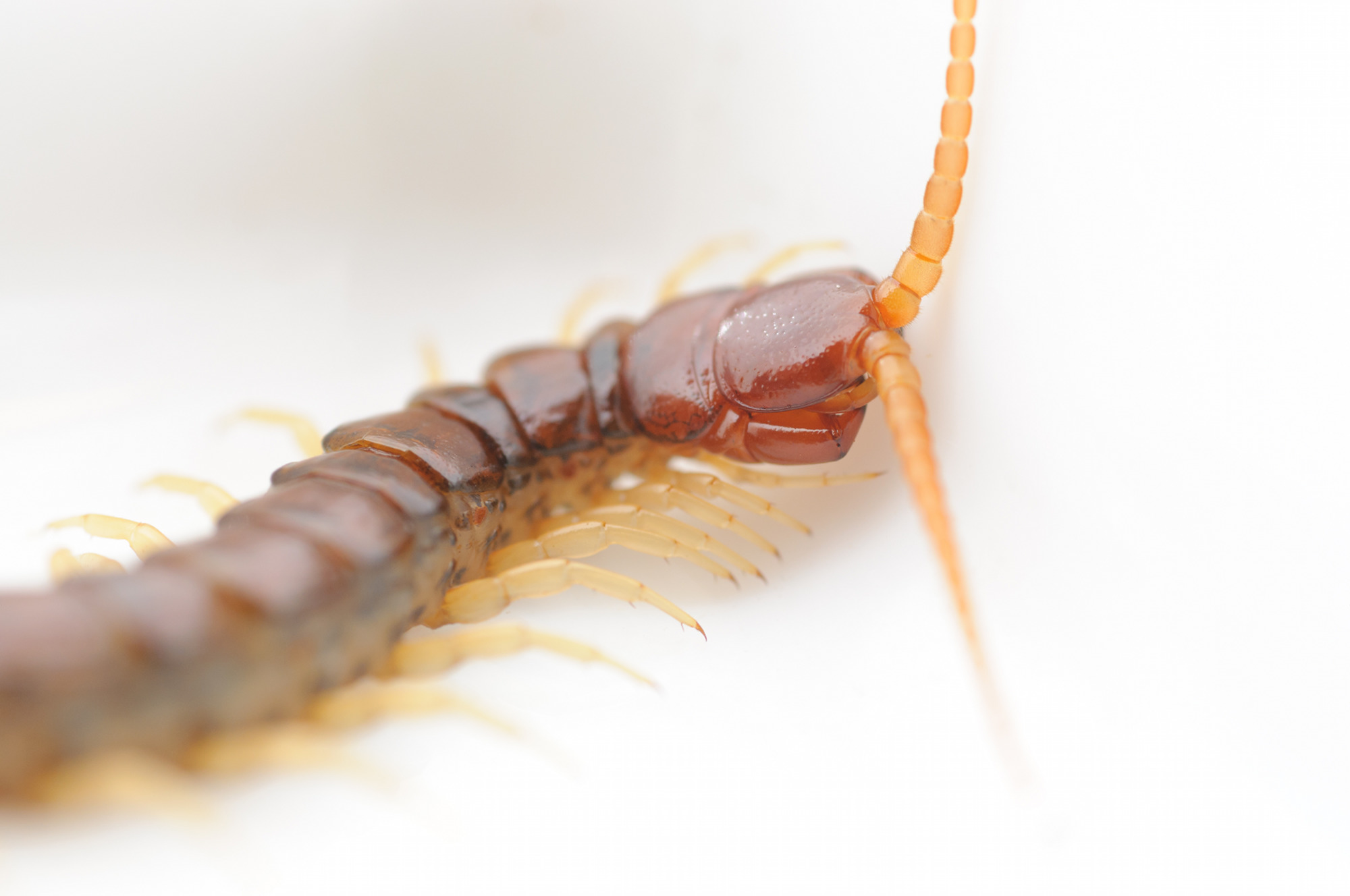

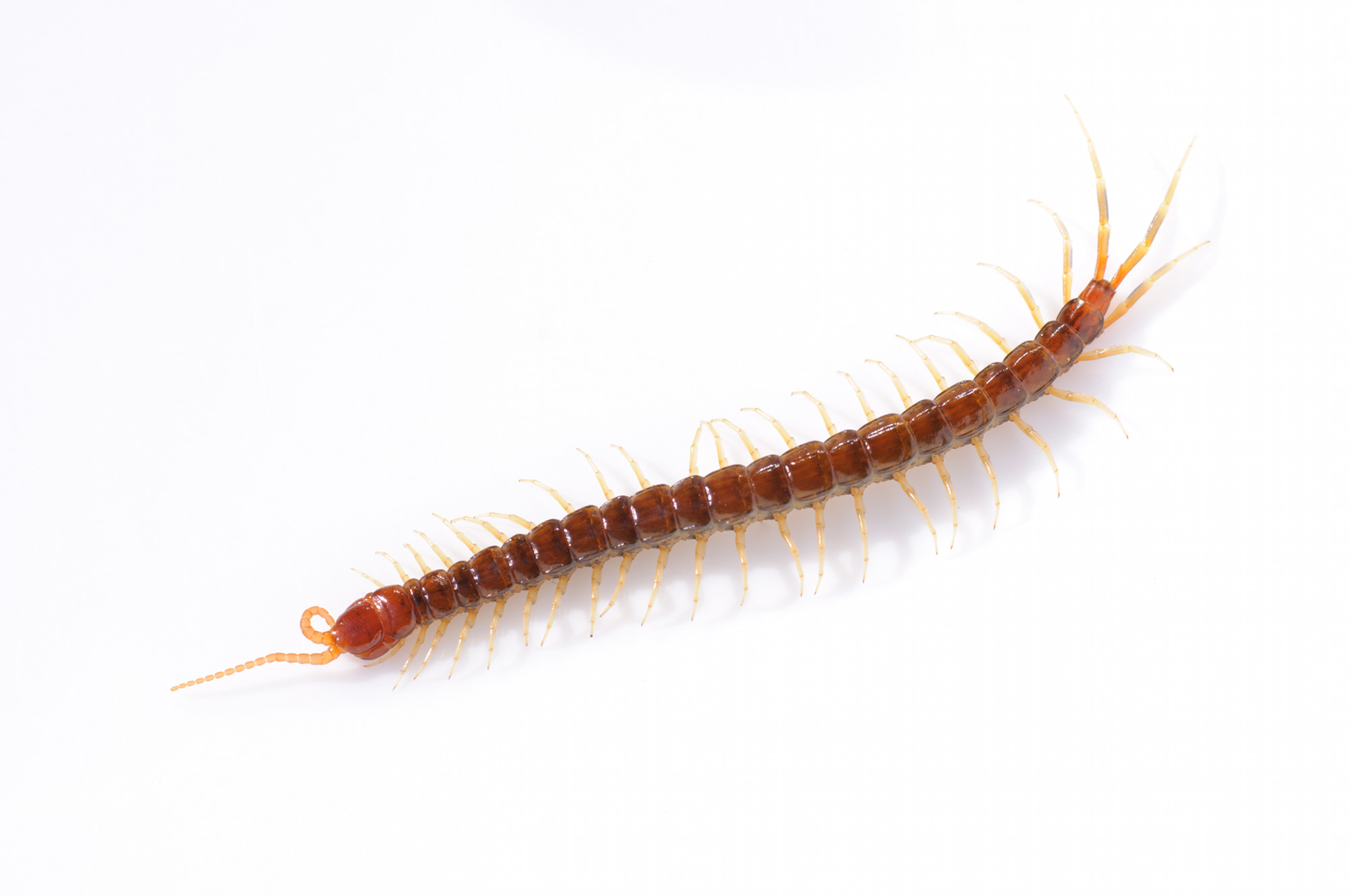

== Species ==
Valid species include:

- Scolopocryptops aberrans Chamberlin (1920)^{c g}
- Scolopocryptops aurantiaca Gervais 1847^{c g}
- Scolopocryptops capillepidatus Takakuwa (1938)^{c g}
- Scolopocryptops capillipedatus (Takakuwa, 1938)^{g}
- Scolopocryptops curtus Takakuwa (1939)^{c g}
- Scolopocryptops denticulatus Bücherl (1946)^{c g}
- Scolopocryptops ferrugineus Linnaeus 1767^{c g}
- Scolopocryptops gracilis Wood, 1862^{c g b}
- Scolopocryptops guacharensis Manfredi 1957^{c g}
- Scolopocryptops melanostomus Newport 1845^{c g}
- Scolopocryptops nigridius McNeill, 1887^{c g b}
- Scolopocryptops nigrimaculatus Song, Song & Zhu 2004^{c g}
- Scolopocryptops peregrinator Crabill (1952)^{c g}
- Scolopocryptops piauhiensis Chagas 2004^{c g}
- Scolopocryptops quadrisulcatus Daday 1891^{c g}
- Scolopocryptops rubiginosus Koch, 1878^{c g b}
- Scolopocryptops sexspinosus Say (1821)^{c g b} (eastern red centipede)
- Scolopocryptops sexspinous (Say, 1821)^{g}
- Scolopocryptops spinicaudus Wood, 1862^{c g b}
- Scolopocryptops spinulifer Bücherl (1949)^{c g}
- Scolopocryptops verdescens Chamberlin (1921)^{c g}
- Scolopocryptops viridis Gervais 1847^{c g}

Data sources: i = ITIS, c = Catalogue of Life, g = GBIF, b = Bugguide.net
