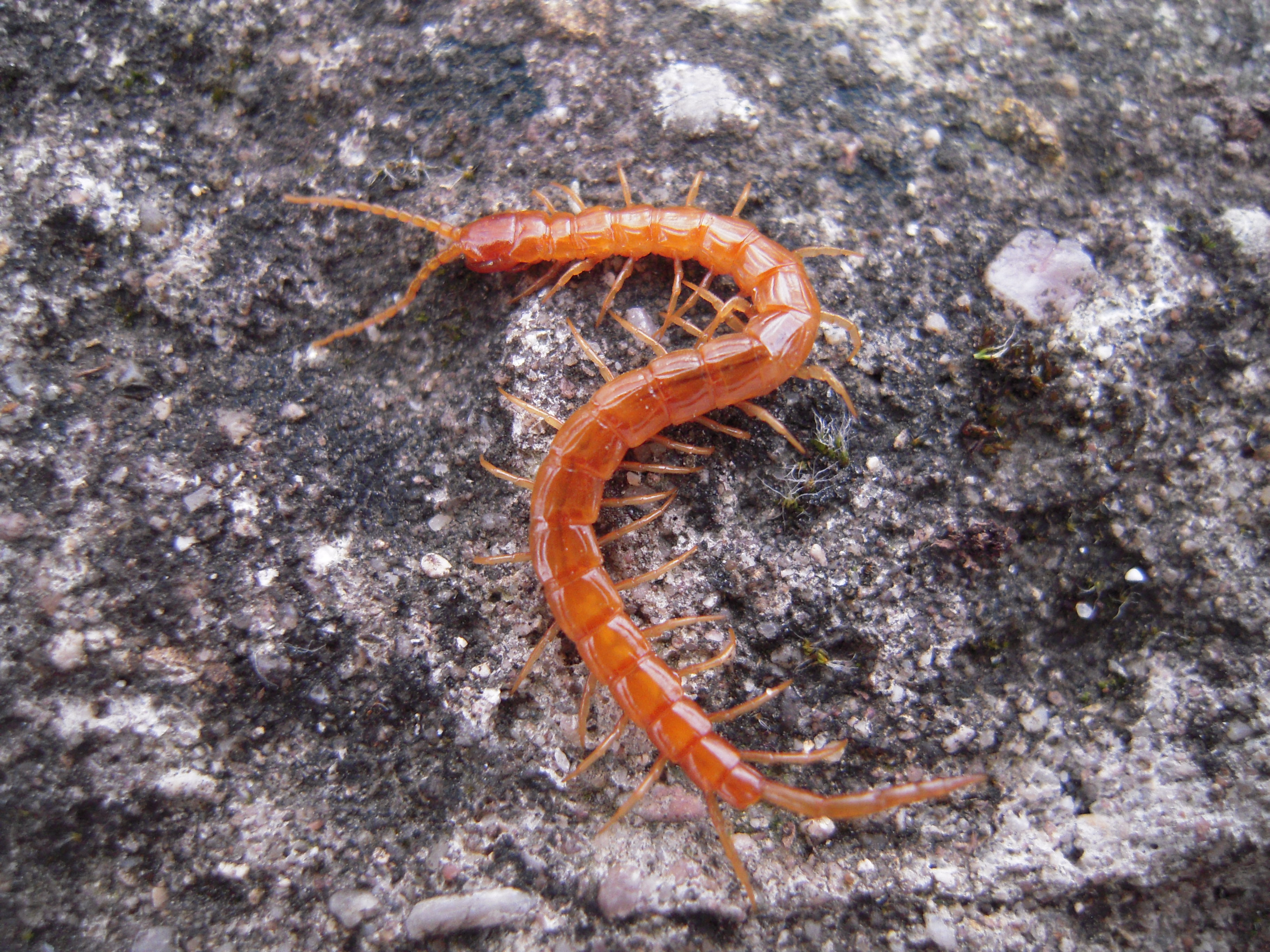

Scientific classification
- Domain: Eukaryota
- Kingdom: Animalia
- Phylum: Arthropoda
- Subphylum: Myriapoda
- Class: Chilopoda
- Order: Scolopendromorpha
- Family: Cryptopidae
- Genus: Cryptops
- Species: C. hortensis

Binomial name
- Cryptops hortensis (Donovan, 1810)

Synonyms
- Scolopendra hortensis Donovan, 1810; Cryptops aenariensis Verhoeff, 1943

= Cryptops hortensis =

Species of centipede

Cryptops hortensis, the common cryptops, is a species of centipede in the family Cryptopidae, genus Cryptops (Leach 1814).

== Description ==
The species is 20–30 millimetres (0.79–1.18 in) long and 1 millimetre (0.039 in) wide. It is pale brown in colour with 21 pairs of legs.

== Distribution and habitat ==
This species is found in all of Europe except for: the Baltic states, Andorra, Belarus, Liechtenstein, Luxembourg, Moldova, Russia, Vatican City and various European islands. It has also been introduced to Tasmania, Australia. It is found in gardens and woodland, and under stones and logs.
