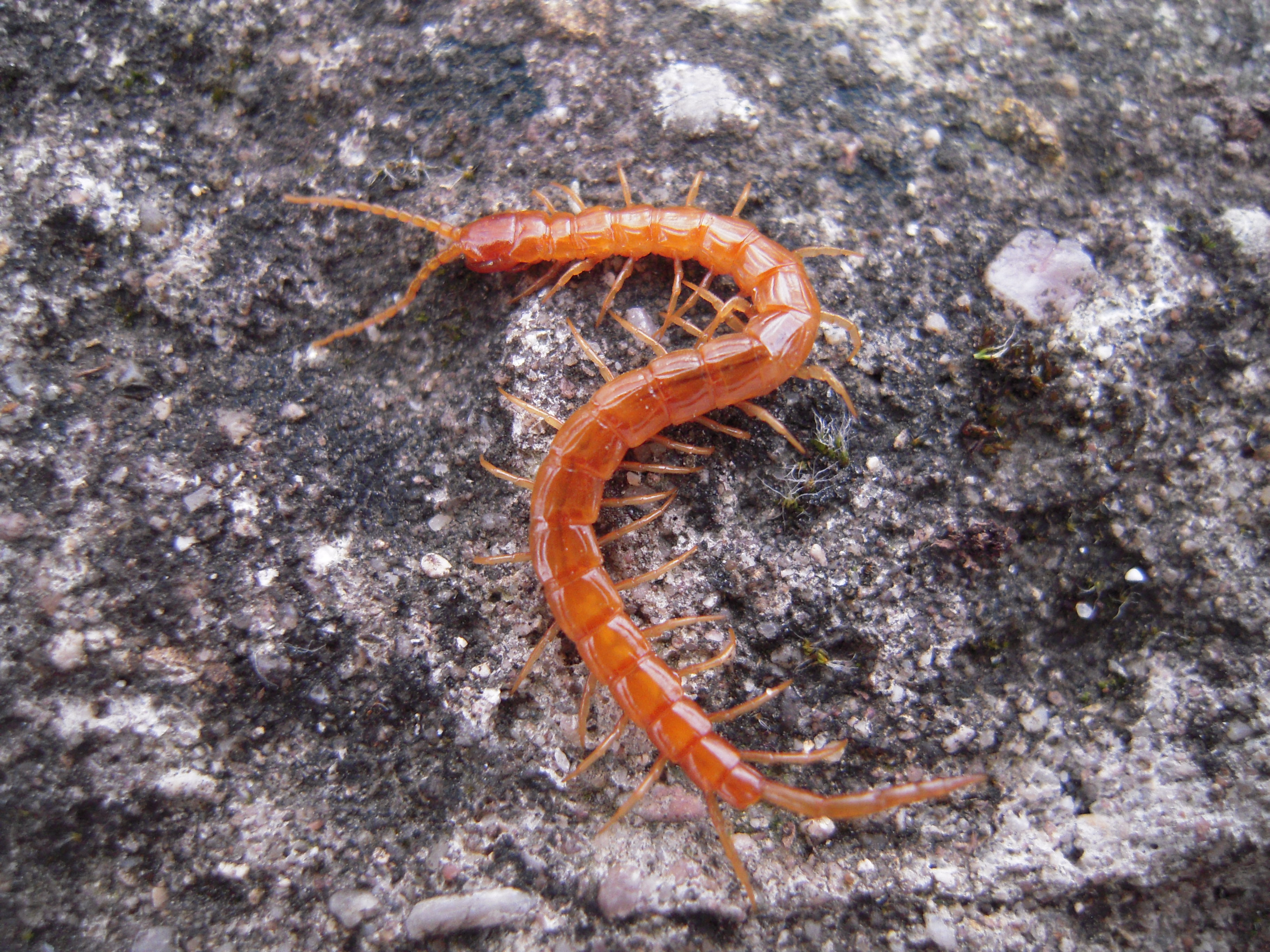
- Cryptops hortensis

Scientific classification
- Kingdom: Animalia
- Phylum: Arthropoda
- Subphylum: Myriapoda
- Class: Chilopoda
- Order: Scolopendromorpha
- Family: Cryptopidae
- Genus: Cryptops; Leach, 1814

Synonyms
- Chromatanops Verhoeff, 1906; Crytops Brullé, 1832; Cryptops Leach, 1815; Haplocryptops Verhoeff, 1934; Mycotheres Rafinesque, 1820; Paratrigonocryptops Demange, 1963; Trichocryptops Verhoeff, 1937; Trigonocryptops Verhoeff, 1906

= Cryptops =

Cryptops Temporal range: Cenomanian–Present

Genus of centipedes

Cryptops (from Ancient Greek κρυπτός (kruptós), meaning "hidden", and ὄψ (óps), meaning "face"), sometimes known as cave centipedes, is a centipede genus in the family Cryptopidae; species records have a world-wide distribution.

== Species ==
The Global Biodiversity Information Facility includes:

- Cryptops acapulcensis Verhoeff, 1934
- Cryptops aelleni Demange, 1963
- Cryptops aernarienis Verhoeff, 1943
- Cryptops afghanus Loksa, 1971
- Cryptops africanus Lawrence, 1955
- Cryptops agilis Meinert, 1868
- Cryptops aloysiisabaudiae Silvestri, 1907
- Cryptops andinensis González-Sponga, 2006
- Cryptops angolensis Machado, 1951
- Cryptops annectus Chamberlin, 1947
- Cryptops annexus Chamberlin, 1962
- Cryptops anomalans Newport, 1844
- Cryptops arapuni Archey, 1922
- Cryptops argentinus Bücherl, 1953
- Cryptops armatus Silvestri, 1899
- Cryptops attemsi Demange, 1963
- Cryptops audax Attems, 1928
- Cryptops australis Newport, 1845
- Cryptops basilewskyi Matic & Darabantu, 1977
- Cryptops bayoni Silvestri, 1910
- Cryptops beebei Chamberlin, 1924
- Cryptops beroni Matic & Stavropoulos, 1988
- Cryptops beshkovi Matic & Stavropoulos, 1988
- Cryptops bivittatus Pocock, 1893
- Cryptops bokumensis Kraus, 1958
- Cryptops bottegii Silvestri, 1897
- Cryptops brachyraphe Verhoeff, 1934
- Cryptops brignolii Matic, 1977
- Cryptops brunneus Chamberlin R., 1921
- Cryptops burenius Verhoeff, 1940
- Cryptops calinus Chamberlin, 1957
- Cryptops camoowealensis Edgecombe, 2006
- Cryptops campestris Attems, 1952
- Cryptops canariensis Latzel, 1895
- Cryptops capensis Lewis, 2013-02
- Cryptops caucasius Verhoeff, 1934
- Cryptops cavernicolus Negrea & Fundora Martinez, 1977
- Cryptops coiffati Demange, 1968
- Cryptops compositus Chamberlin, 1952
- Cryptops corcyraeus Verhoeff, 1901
- Cryptops cornifer Chamberlin, 1918
- Cryptops covertus Chamberlin, 1951
- Cryptops crassipes Silvestri, 1895
- Cryptops croaticus Verhoeff, 1931
- Cryptops cubanus Matic, Negrea & Fundora Martinez, 1977
- Cryptops danhomenou Brolemann, 1926
- Cryptops daszaki Lewis, 2002
- Cryptops debilis Bücherl, 1950
- Cryptops decoratus Lawrence, 1960
- Cryptops dentipes Lawrence, 1960
- Cryptops detectus Silvestri, 1899
- Cryptops dianae Matic & Stavropoulos, 1990
- Cryptops dilagus Archey, 1921
- Cryptops doriae Pocock, 1891
- Cryptops dubiotarsalis Bücherl, 1946
- Cryptops echinipes Lawrence, 1955
- Cryptops erkowiti Lewis, 1967
- Cryptops ethophor Chamberlin, 1920
- Cryptops eutypus Chamberlin, 1951
- Cryptops feae Pocock R.I., 1891
- Cryptops fitzsimonsi Lawrence, 1959
- Cryptops floridanus Chamberlin, 1925
- Cryptops frater Chamberlin, 1962
- Cryptops fur Meinert, 1886
- Cryptops furciferens Chamberlin, 1921
- Cryptops galatheae Meinert, 1886
- Cryptops garganensis Verhoeff, 1934
- Cryptops gigas Kraepelin, 1903
- Cryptops goiasus Chamberlin, 1958
- Cryptops gracilimus Machado, 1951
- Cryptops gynnis Chamberlin, 1956
- Cryptops haasei Attems, 1903
- Cryptops heathi Chamberlin, 1914
- Cryptops hephaestus Ázara & Ferreira, 2013-09
- Cryptops hispanus Brolemann, 1920
- Cryptops hortensis Donovan, 1810
- Cryptops iheringi Brölemann, 1902
- Cryptops illyricus Verhoeff, 1933
- Cryptops incertus Attems, 1937
- Cryptops indicus [no auth]
- Cryptops inermipes Pocock, 1888
- Cryptops iporangensis Ázara & Ferreira, 2013-09
- Cryptops iucundus Würmli, 1972
- Cryptops japonicus Takakuwa, 1934
- Cryptops jeanneli Matic, 1960
- Cryptops kafbuensis Goffinet, 1971
- Cryptops kafubuensis Goffinet, 1971
- Cryptops kalobensis Goffinet, 1971
- Cryptops kempi Silvestri, 1924
- Cryptops kivuensis Lawrence, 1953
- Cryptops kosswigi Chamberlin, 1952
- Cryptops lamprethus Chamberlin, 1920
- Cryptops lapidicolus Matic, Negrea & Fundora Martinez, 1977
- †Cryptops leachi Mao & Di, 2026
- Cryptops legagus Edgecombe, Akkari, Netherlands & Du Preez, 2020
- Cryptops leucopodus Rafinesque, 1820
- Cryptops libriceps Attems, 1952
- Cryptops livius Chamberlin, 1951
- Cryptops lobatus Verhoeff, 1931
- Cryptops longicornis Ribaut, 1915
- Cryptops longipes Goux, 1950
- Cryptops loveridgei Lawrence, 1953
- Cryptops malabarensis Balan, Sureshan & Khanna, 2012
- Cryptops malaccanus Verhoeff, 1937
- Cryptops manni Chamberlin, 1915
- Cryptops martinicensis Schileyko, Iorio & Coulis, 2018
- Cryptops mauritianus Verhoeff, 1939
- Cryptops medius Verhoeff, 1901
- Cryptops megalopora Haase, 1887
- Cryptops melanifer Chamberlin, 1955
- Cryptops melanotypus Chamberlin, 1941
- Cryptops micrus Chamberlin, 1922
- Cryptops milloti Lawrence, 1960
- Cryptops mirabilis Machado, 1951
- Cryptops mirus Chamberlin, 1920
- Cryptops modigliani Silvestri, 1895
- Cryptops monilis Gervais, 1849
- Cryptops monilisin Gervais, 1849
- Cryptops nahuelbuta Chamberlin, 1955
- Cryptops nanus Attems, 1938
- Cryptops nautiphilus Chamberlin, 1939
- Cryptops navigans Chamberlin, 1913
- Cryptops navis Chamberlin, 1930
- Cryptops neocaledonicus Ribaut, 1923
- Cryptops nepalensis Lewis, 1999
- Cryptops nigropictus Takakuwa, 1936
- Cryptops nigropictus Verhoeff, 1936
- Cryptops niloticus Lewis, 1967
- Cryptops niuensis Chamberlin, 1920
- Cryptops nivicomes Verhoeff, 1938
- Cryptops notandus Silvestri, 1939
- Cryptops numidicus Lucas, 1846
- Cryptops omissus Ribaut, 1915
- Cryptops orientalis Jangi, 1955
- Cryptops orizaba Chamberlin, 1943
- Cryptops osellai Matic, 1977
- Cryptops parisi Brolemann, 1920
- Cryptops patagonicus Meinert, 1886
- Cryptops pauciporus Lawrence, 1955
- Cryptops pauliani Lawrence, 1960
- Cryptops pauperatus Attems, 1937
- Cryptops penicillatus Lawrence, 1960
- Cryptops peringueyi Attems, 1928
- Cryptops persimilis Attems, 1943
- Cryptops philammus Attems, 1928
- Cryptops pictus Ribaut, 1923
- Cryptops planquettei Demange, 1965
- Cryptops polyodontus Attems, 1903
- Cryptops pori Negrea, 1997
- Cryptops positus Chamberlin, 1939
- Cryptops propinquus Lawrence, 1960
- Cryptops pugnans Chamberlin, 1922
- Cryptops punicus Silvestri, 1896
- Cryptops quadrisulcatus Demange, 1963
- Cryptops relictus Chamberlin R., 1920
- Cryptops religens Chamberlin & Wang, 1951
- Cryptops rhodesianus Attems, 1928
- Cryptops ribauti Demange, 1963
- Cryptops riedeli Matic, Negrea & Fundora Martinez, 1977
- Cryptops roeplainsensis Edgecombe, 2005
- Cryptops rossi Chamberlin, 1955
- Cryptops rouxi Ribaut, 1923
- Cryptops royi Demange, 1963
- Cryptops rucneri Matic, 1967
- Cryptops ruficeps Pocock, 1894
- Cryptops sankuruensis Schubart, 1938
- Cryptops sarasini Ribaut, 1923
- Cryptops schubarti Bücherl, 1953
- Cryptops setosior Chamberlin, 1959
- Cryptops similis Machado, 1953
- Cryptops sinesicus Chamberlin, 1940
- Cryptops socotrensis Pocock, 1903
- Cryptops songi Song, Zhu & Liang, 2010
- Cryptops spec Schileyko, Iorio & Coulis, 2018
- Cryptops spelaeoraptor Ázara & Ferreira, 2014
- Cryptops speleorex Vahtera, Stoev & Akkari, 2020
- Cryptops spinipes Pocock, 1891
- Cryptops stabilis Chamberlin, 1944
- Cryptops sternalis Brolemann, 1926
- Cryptops striatus Takakuwa, 1936
- Cryptops stupendus Attems, 1928
- Cryptops sublitoralis Verhoeff, 1931
- Cryptops sulciceps Chamberlin, 1920
- Cryptops sutteri Würmli, 1972
- Cryptops tahitianus Chamberlin, 1920
- Cryptops toumodiensis Demange, 1965
- Cryptops triangulifer Verhoeff, 1937
- Cryptops triserratus Attems, 1903
- Cryptops trisulcatus Brolemann, 1902
- Cryptops troglobius Matic Negrea & Fundora Martinez, 1977
- Cryptops typhloporus Lawrence, 1955
- Cryptops umbricus Verhoeff, 1931
- Cryptops validus Meinert, 1886
- Cryptops vanderplaetseni Demange, 1963
- Cryptops vector Chamberlin, 1939
- Cryptops venezuelae Chamberlin, 1939
- Cryptops verdascens Goffinet, 1971
- Cryptops vulcanicus Zapparoli, 1990
- Cryptops watsingus Chamberlin, 1939
