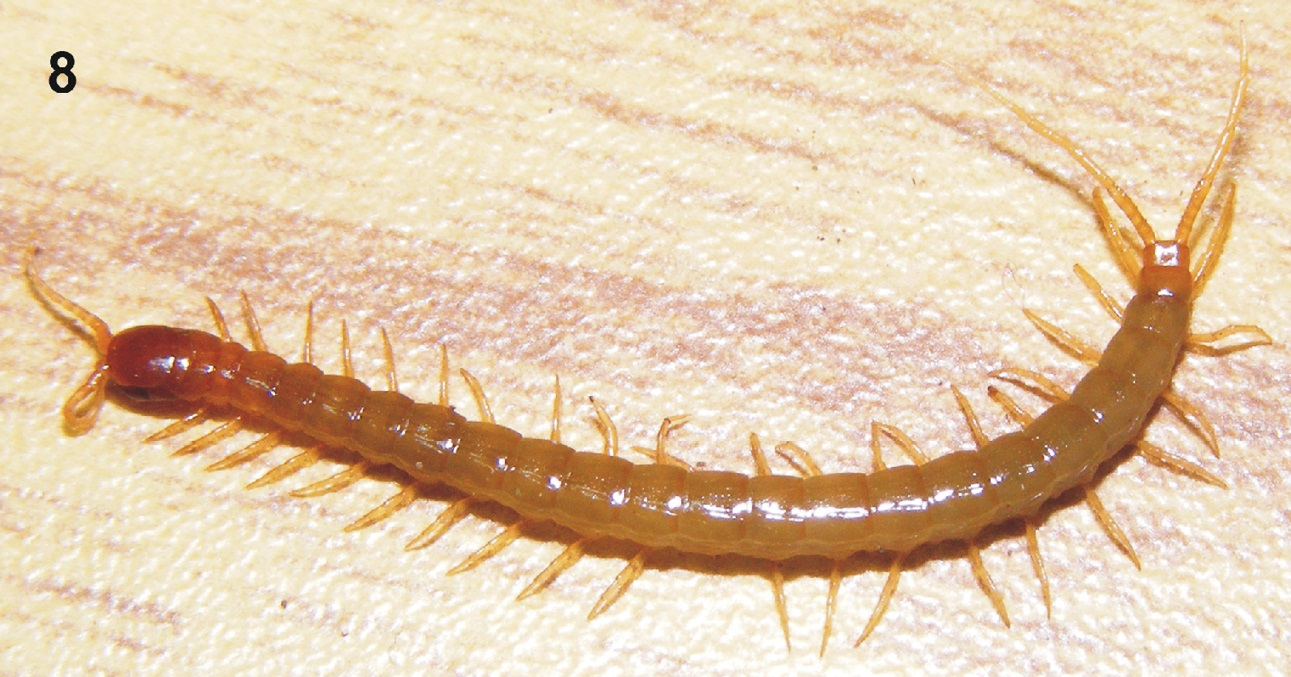
- Tidops nisargani

Scientific classification
- Kingdom: Animalia
- Phylum: Arthropoda
- Subphylum: Myriapoda
- Class: Chilopoda
- Order: Scolopendromorpha
- Family: Scolopocryptopidae; Pocock, 1896

Subfamilies
- Ectonocryptopinae; Kethopinae; Newportiinae; Scolopocryptopinae

= Scolopocryptopidae =

Family of centipedes

Scolopocryptopidae is a family of blind centipedes in the order Scolopendromorpha. The number of leg-bearing segments is fixed at 23 for species in this family, which distinguishes the species in this family from all other centipede species. This family includes more than 90 species.

== Distribution ==
Most species in this family are found in the Americas (North America, South America, and the West Indies) and East Asia (Japan, Korea, China, Vietnam, the Philippines, and Indonesia). Some species have also been recorded in West Africa (from Guinea and Sierra Leone to Gabon), New Guinea, and Fiji. This family is most diverse and abundant in the New World, especially in the Neotropical realm.

== Description ==
Species in this family are eyeless and have 23 pairs of legs. The second maxillary claw in these species is pectinate. These centipedes have a forcipular coxosternite without prominent serrate tooth-plates, featuring at most a few shallow teeth.

Species in this family feature a distinctive gizzard. Gizzards in the families Scolopocryptopidae, Cryptopidae, and Plutoniumidae are characterized by a sieve formed by multiple transverse rows of elongate projections along the inside of the gizzard. These projections taper with their tips pointing forward toward the anterior end of the gizzard. In the family Scolopocryptopidae, these stiff projections are pineapple-shaped and kinked in the middle. This kink separates the proximal and distal halves of these projections, with the distal half pointing more directly forward. These projections contrast with those found in other families, which feature projections that curve evenly without any kink.

== Phylogeny ==
Phylogenetic studies using molecular data indicate that the three eyeless families Scolopocryptopidae, Cryptopidae, and Plutoniumidae are each monophyletic and together form a clade. This blind clade also features sieve projections in the gizzard as a shared characteristic. These results imply a single shift from 21 to 23 pairs of legs leading to the last common ancestor of the family Scolopocryptopidae, with kinked sieve projections in the gizzard as an unreversed autapomorphy.

== Subfamilies ==
This family includes four subfamilies: Ectonocryptopinae, Kethopinae, Newportiinae, and Scolopocryptopinae. Newportiinae is the largest of these subfamilies, containing about 60 species, with most species in the genus Newportia (more than 50 species) and a few species in the genera Tidops and Kartops. The next largest subfamily is Scolopocryptopinae, containing more than 20 species, with nearly all of these species in the genus Scolopocryptops and only a couple of species in the genus Dinocryptops. The other two subfamilies are small, each with only a few species: Kethopinae includes the genera Kethops and Thalkethops, and Ectonocryptopinae includes the genera Ectonocryptops and Ectonocryptoides.

Species in the subfamily Newportiinae are found in South America, Central America, and the Caribbean. Species in the subfamily Scolopocryptopinae are found in temperate and tropical regions of the Americas, in West Africa, and from East Asia to New Guinea. Species in the subfamily Kethopinae are found in western North America, and species in the subfamily Ectonocryptopinae are found in Mexico and Belize.

== Genera ==
This family includes the following genera distributed among four subfamilies:

Subfamily Ectonocryptopinae Shelley & Mercurio, 2005

- Ectonocryptoides Shelley & Mercurio, 2005
- Ectonocryptops Crabill, 1977

Subfamily Kethopinae Shelley, 2002

- Kethops Chamberlin, 1912
- Thalkethops Crabill, 1960

Subfamily Newportiinae Pocock, 1896

- Kartops Archey, 1923
- Newportia Gervais, 1847
- Tidops Chamberlin, 1915

Subfamily Scolopocryptopinae Pocock, 1896

- Scolopocryptops Newport, 1844
- Dinocryptops Crabill, 1953
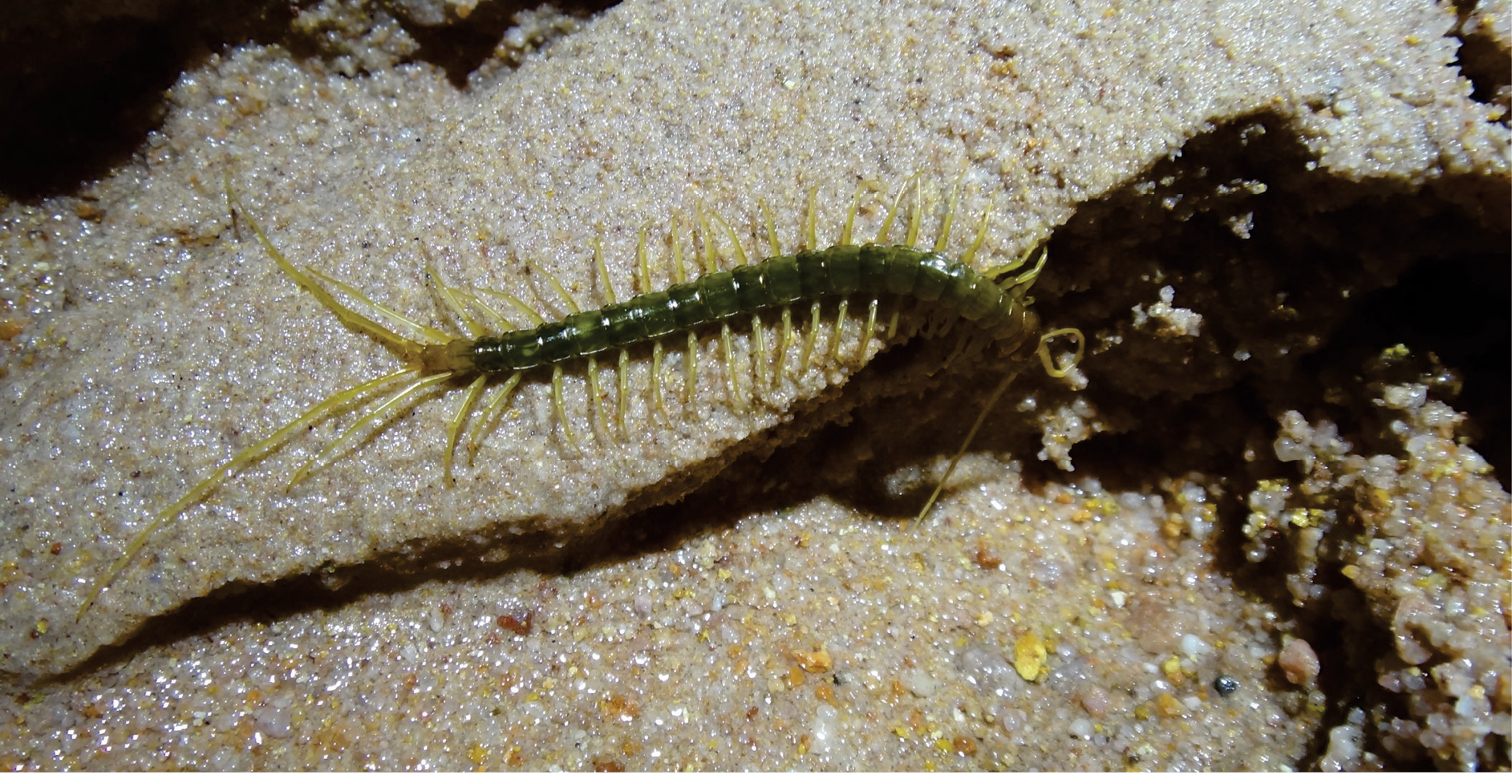
Scolopocryptos troglocaudatus

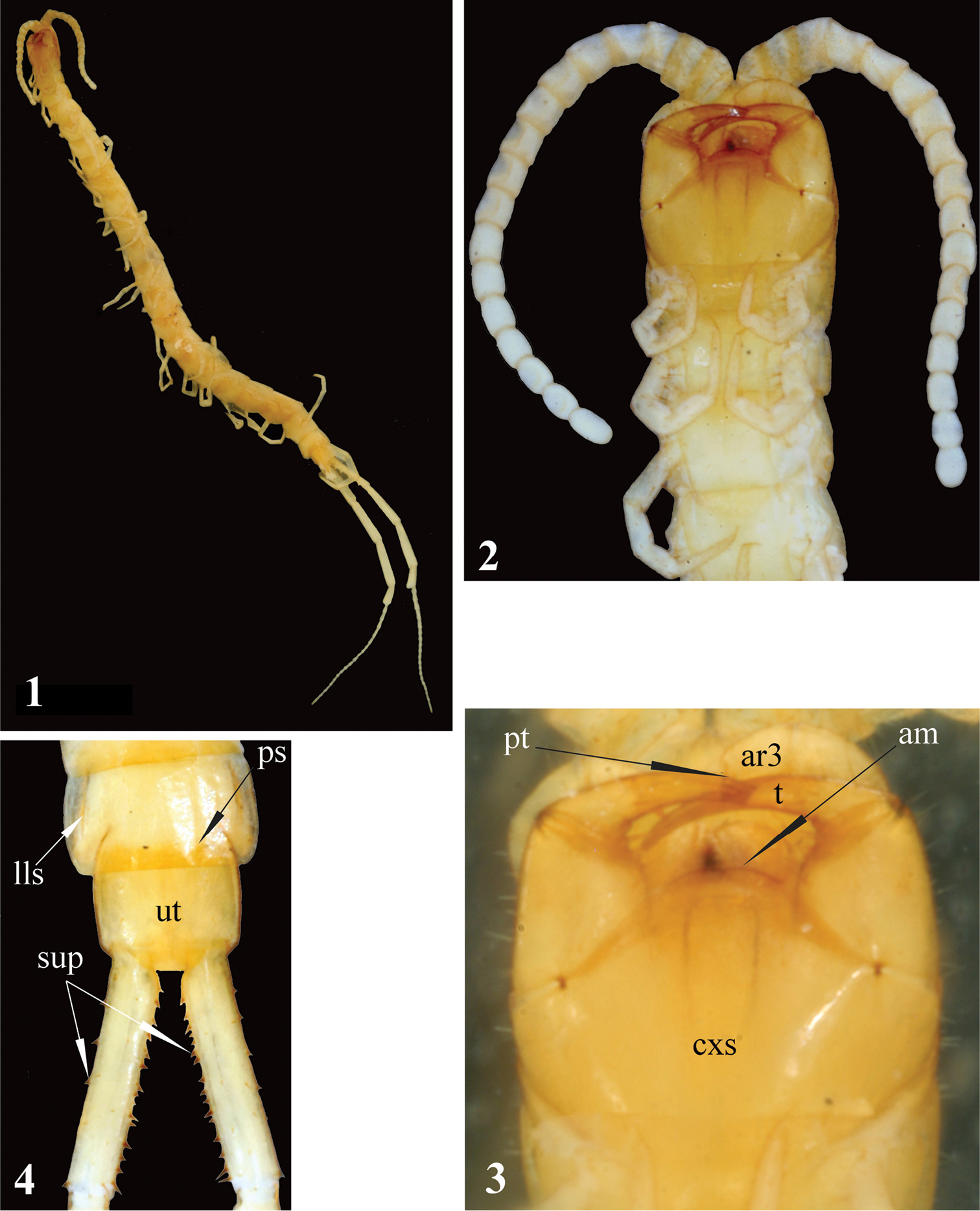
Newportia stoevi

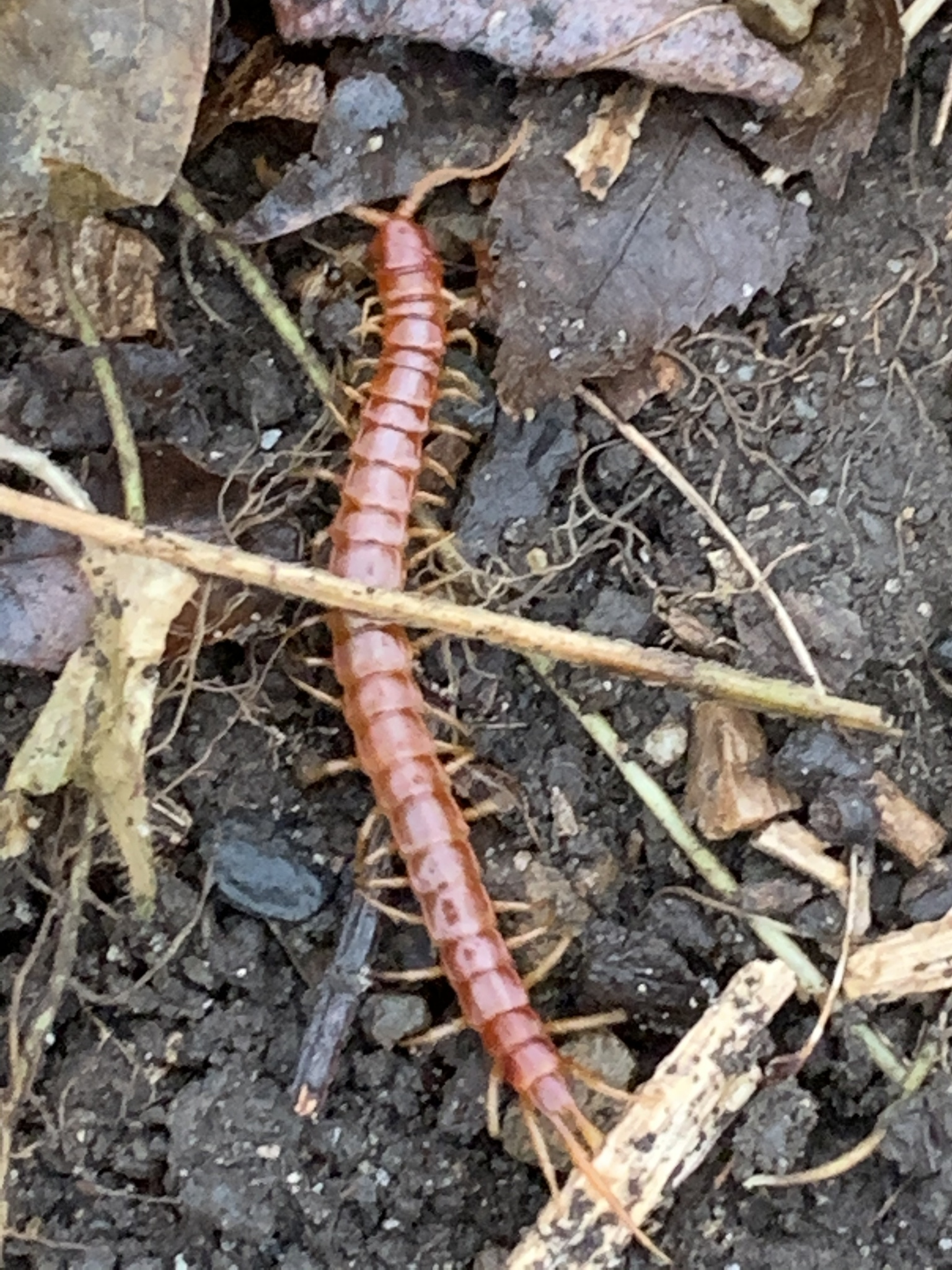
Scolopocryptops sexspinosus

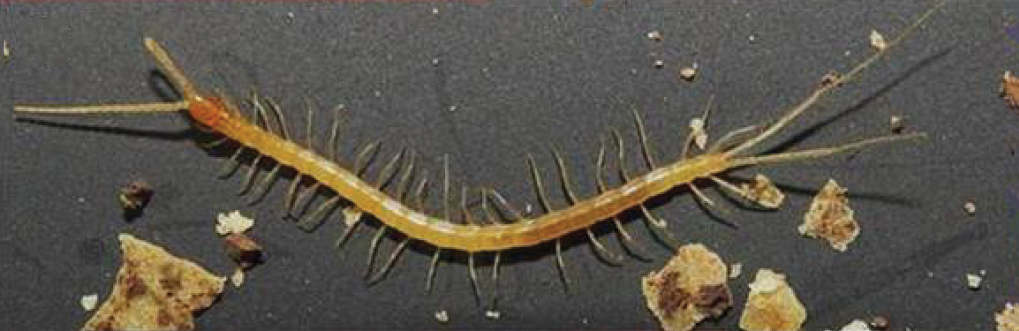
Newportia spelaea
