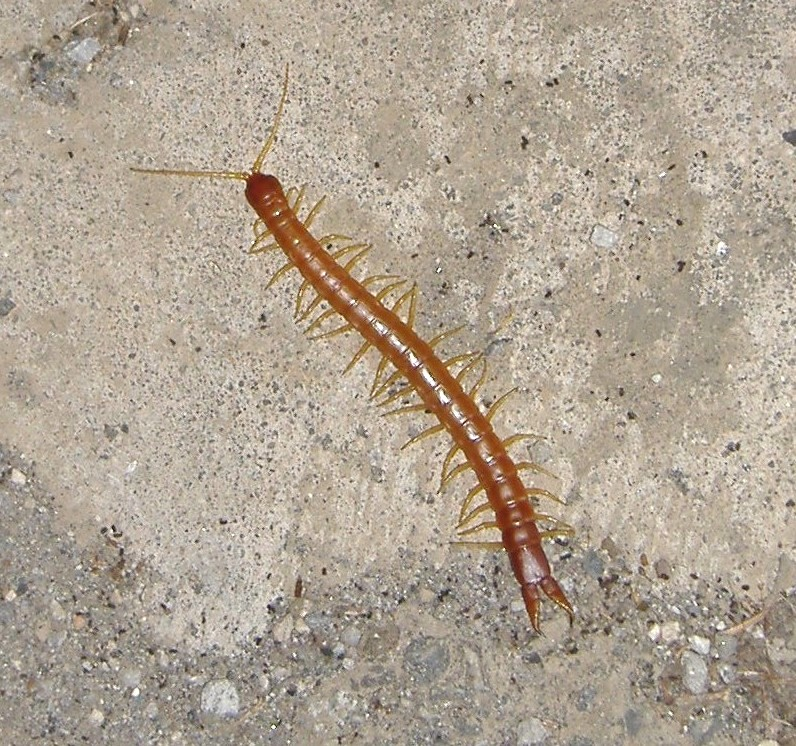
- Plutonium zwierleini

Scientific classification
- Domain: Eukaryota
- Kingdom: Animalia
- Phylum: Arthropoda
- Subphylum: Myriapoda
- Class: Chilopoda
- Order: Scolopendromorpha
- Family: Plutoniumidae; Bollman, 1893

= Plutoniumidae =

Family of centipedes

Plutoniumidae is a family of centipedes belonging to the order Scolopendromorpha. Centipedes in this family are blind and have 21 pairs of legs.

Genera:

- Plutonium Cavanna, 1881
- Theatops Newport, 1844
