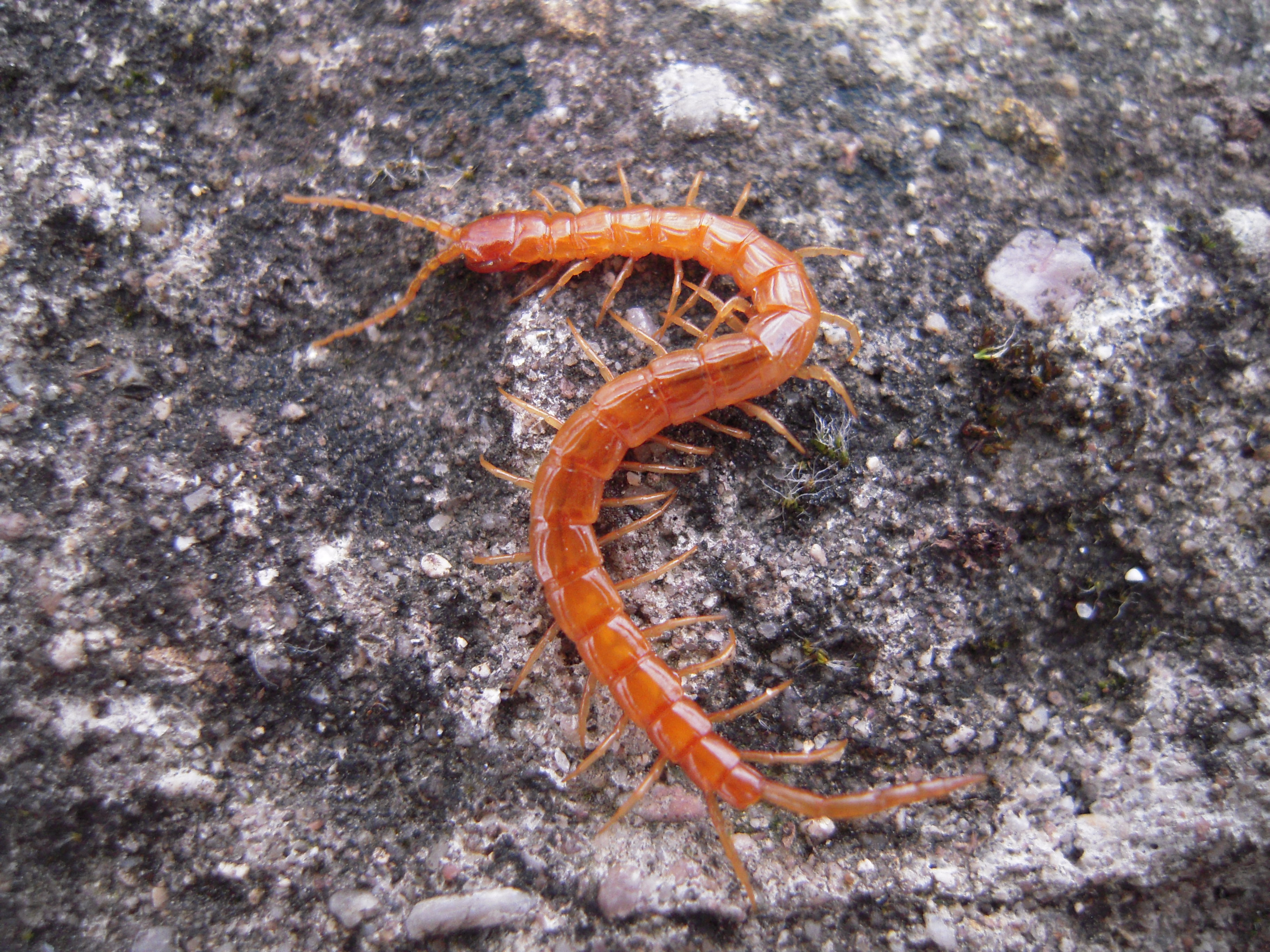
- Cryptops hortensis

Scientific classification
- Kingdom: Animalia
- Phylum: Arthropoda
- Subphylum: Myriapoda
- Class: Chilopoda
- Order: Scolopendromorpha
- Family: Cryptopidae; Kohlrausch, 1881

Genera
- See text

= Cryptopidae =

Family of centipedes

The Cryptopidae are a family of scolopendromorph centipedes. Cryptopids are blind (lacking ocelli) and possess 21 pairs of legs. The genus Cryptops is the numerically largest in the family, comprising over 150 species worldwide.

== Classification ==
The following genera, may be included:

1. Cryptops Leach, 1814
2. Eremops Bollman, 1893
3. Mimops Kraepelin, 1903
4. Paracryptops Pocock, 1891
5. Tonkinodentus Schileyko, 1992
6. Trigonocryptops Verhoeff, 1906

The genera Plutonium and Theatops Newport, 1844, formerly classified in the cryptopid subfamily Plutoniuminae, are now placed in the recently elevated family Plutoniumidae.
