= Mecistocephalus zygethus =

Scientific classification
- Kingdom: Animalia
- Phylum: Arthropoda
- Subphylum: Myriapoda
- Class: Chilopoda
- Order: Geophilomorpha
- Family: Mecistocephalidae
- Genus: Mecistocephalus
- Species: M. zygethus

Binomial name
- Mecistocephalus zygethus Chamberlin, 1939

Species of centipede

Mecistocephalus zygethus is a species of soil centipede in the family Mecistocephalidae. This centipede is found in Indonesia on the island of New Guinea. This species features 51 pairs of legs rather than the 49 leg pairs usually observed in the genus Mecistocephalus.

== Discovery and distribution ==
This species was first described in 1939 by American zoologist Ralph Vary Chamberlin. He based the original description of this species on three specimens. The Dutch biologist Willem Cornelis van Heurn collected these specimens in 1920 at an elevation between 1,800 and 2,400 meters in Doormanpad in Western New Guinea. This species is only known from Western New Guinea.

== Description ==
This species features 51 leg pairs and measures about 35 mm in length. The dorsal surface is light brown mottled with darker brown, the head and forcipules are reddish brown, and the legs are yellow. The head is elongated with lateral margins that converge toward a strainght posterior margin. The middle piece of the labrum is large and shaped like a lance. The margins of the side pieces of the labrum are smooth and straight, except for the outer corners, which are slightly convex. The inner corners of these margins do not protrude beyond the posterior end of the middle piece. The mandible features only seven or eight lamellae, with seven teeth on the first lamella.

When closed, the forcipules extend beyond the end of the first article of the antennae. The first article of the forcipule features two teeth, with the distal tooth much larger. The two intermediate articles each feature a tooth, with a large tooth on the third article. The ultimate article features a basal tooth in the form of a small knob. The furrow on the sternites does not divide into branches at the anterior end. The basal element of the ultimate legs feature about 21 pores on the ventral and lateral surfaces, but none on the dorsal surface or the upper part of the lateral surface. These pores are fairly large on the ventral surface but become smaller toward the lateral surface.

This species shares many traits with other species in the genus Mecistocephalus. For example, like other species in this genus, the species M. zygethus features a head that is evidently longer than wide. Furthermore, like other species in this genus, this species features a furrow on the sternites of the trunk segments. Moreover, like many other species in this genus, this species features two teeth on the first article of the forcipules. Unlike most species of Mecistocephalus, however, M. zygethus features 51 leg pairs rather than the 49 pairs usually observed in this genus.

Although some other species of Mecistocephalus also have 51 leg pairs, these species may be distinguished from M. zygethus based on other traits. For example, the species M. erythroceps, M. evansi, M. gigas, M. lifuensis, M. pseustes, M. rhombifer, and M. sechellarum each feature 51 leg pairs. The furrow on the sternites, however, is forked in each of these other species but not in M. zygethus.
