= Mecistocephalus waipaheenas =

Scientific classification
- Kingdom: Animalia
- Phylum: Arthropoda
- Subphylum: Myriapoda
- Class: Chilopoda
- Order: Geophilomorpha
- Family: Mecistocephalidae
- Genus: Mecistocephalus
- Species: M. waipaheenas

Binomial name
- Mecistocephalus waipaheenas (Chamberlin, 1953)

Synonyms
- Fusichila waipaheenas Chamberlin, 1953

Species of centipede

Mecistocephalus waipaheenas is a species of soil centipede in the family Mecistocephalidae. This species was described based on a specimen found in the Hawaiian Islands. This centipede measures about 25 mm in length and features 49 pairs of legs.

== Discovery and distribution ==
This species was first described in 1953 by American myriapodologist Ralph Vary Chamberlin. He based the original description of this species on a single female specimen found in 1944 under the bark of a dead tree at Waipahee on the island of Kauai in Hawaii. This centipede is known only from Hawaii.

== Taxonomy ==
Chamberlin originally described this species under the name Fusichila waipaheenas as the type species of a new genus Fusichila. He placed this species in its own genus in light of its unusual labrum, which distinguishes this centipede from all others in the family Mecistocephalidae. In 2004, however, authorities suggested that the specimen described by Chamberlin is a juvenile of a species of Mecistocephalus with an abnormally developed labrum, expressing doubts about the validity of the monotypic genus and species proposed by Chamberlin based on this specimen. Authorities now deem Fusichila to be a junior synonym of Mecistocephalus. References list M. waipaheenas as an accepted species, but some also suggest that the validity of this species requires critical evaluation.

== Description ==
This centipede measures about 25 mm in length and features 49 leg pairs. The body is yellow, but the head and forcipules are chestnut. The head is almost twice as long as wide and features a straight spiculum shaped like a cone on each side. Unlike all other species in the family Mecistocephalidae, this centipede features a labrum formed by only one piece rather than a middle piece with a lateral piece on each side. The second maxillae are short, and each is bluntly rounded at the distal end, which features a well developed claw. The groove on the sternites is deep and not forked at the anterior end. The basal elements of the ultimate legs feature only a few small pores, four on one side and only two on the other.
