= Mecistocephalus subgigas =

Scientific classification
- Kingdom: Animalia
- Phylum: Arthropoda
- Subphylum: Myriapoda
- Class: Chilopoda
- Order: Geophilomorpha
- Family: Mecistocephalidae
- Genus: Mecistocephalus
- Species: M. subgigas

Binomial name
- Mecistocephalus subgigas (Silvestri, 1919)

Synonyms
- Lamnonyx subgigas Silvestri, 1919

Species of centipede

Mecistocephalus subgigas is a species of soil centipede in the family Mecistocephalidae. This centipede is found on the island of New Guinea. This species has 49 pairs of legs and can reach 60 mm in length.

== Discovery and distribution ==
This species was first described in 1919 by the Italian myriapodologist Filippo Silvestri. He based the original description of this species on specimens found in the villages of Simbang and Sattelberg, both in Morobe Province in Papua New Guinea. This species is known only from Papua New Guinea.

== Taxonomy ==
Silvestri originally described this species under the name Lamnonyx subgigas. In 1920, however, the American biologist Ralph V. Chamberlin placed this species in the genus Dasyptyx instead. Authorities now deem both Lamnonyx and Dasyptyx to be junior synonyms of Mecistocephalus.

== Description ==
This species features 49 leg pairs and can reach 60 mm in length and 2.5 mm in width. The body is yellow with some patches of dark pigment, and the head is a brownish red. The dorsal plate on the head is almost twice as long as wide. The mandible features 15 to 20 lamellae, with six or seven teeth on the first lamella. The lamellae bear teeth only on the distal part, with the more proximal part covered with small setae instead. The forcipule features two teeth on the first article and one tooth on each of the other three articles. The sternites feature a groove that is forked at the anterior end. The sternite of the last leg-bearing segment is shaped like a long trapezoid and features dense bristles on the posterior part. The basal element of each of the ultimate legs features one large pore and numerous smaller pores. The ultimate legs are at least twice as long as the penultimate legs.

This species exhibits many traits that characterize the genus Mecistocephalus. For example, like other species in this genus, this species features a head that is evidently longer than wide, second maxillae that reach beyond the first maxillae, and a groove on the sternites of the trunk segments. Furthermore, like other species in this genus, this species also features a transverse frontal line on the dorsal surface of the head, a longitudinal areolate stripe down the middle of the clypeus, setae and spicula on the pleurites on each side of the head, a longitudinal suture dividing the coxosternite of the first maxillae down the middle, an undivided coxosternite of the second maxillae, and ultimate legs that are as slender in the male as in the female. Moreover, as in other species in this genus, the forcipular tergum in this species is only slightly wider than long and features a longitudinal groove in the middle.

This species shares more distinctive traits with another species in the same genus, M. uncifer, which is also found in Papua New Guinea. For example, each of these species features 49 leg pairs, a head that is almost twice as long as wide, forcipules with two teeth on the first article, and a forked groove on the sternites. Furthermore, in both of these species, each of the lamellae on the mandible bears teeth only at the distal end and features a long stalk bearing a row of setae instead of teeth. Authorities placed both M. subgigas and M. uncifer in the taxon Dasyptyx, first proposed as a genus, then deemed a subgenus, based on this feature of the mandible.

The species M. subgigas can be distinguished from M. uncifer, however, based on other traits. For example, the basal element of each of the ultimate legs features one pore that is distinctly larger than all the others in M. subgigas but not in M. uncifer. Furthermore, the teeth on the first article of the forcipule are large and curved like hooks in M. uncifer but not in M. subgigas.
