= Mecistocephalus magister =

Scientific classification
- Kingdom: Animalia
- Phylum: Arthropoda
- Subphylum: Myriapoda
- Class: Chilopoda
- Order: Geophilomorpha
- Family: Mecistocephalidae
- Genus: Mecistocephalus
- Species: M. magister

Binomial name
- Mecistocephalus magister Chamberlin, 1939

Species of centipede

Mecistocephalus magister is a species of soil centipede in the Mecistocephalidae family. This centipede is found in Indonesia on the island of New Guinea. This species features 49 pairs of legs and can reach 100 mm in length.

== Discovery and distribution ==
This species was first described in 1939 by the American myriapodologist Ralph Vary Chamberlin. He based the original description of this species on many specimens, including several adults, found in 1920 at Doormanpad in Western New Guinea. This species is known only from Western New Guinea.

== Description ==
This species features 49 leg pairs and can reach 100 mm in length. The dorsal surface of the body is brown with a network of fine black lines, the legs are brown, and the head, antennae, and forcipules are chestnut. The dorsal plate on the head features a frontal line and is almost twice as long as its maximum width. Each of the antennae tapers toward the distal end. The posterior margin of the side pieces of the labrum is convex near the middle piece. This margin is smooth except for seven distinct rounded teeth near the middle piece. The mandible features fifteen lamellae (comb blades) including twelve that are fully developed, the last two, which are poorly developed, and the thirteenth, which is intermediate in development. The first lamella features five teeth.

The first article of the forcipule features two stout teeth with the disal tooth larger than the more proximal tooth. The two intermediate articles of the forcipule each feature a tooth, with the tooth on the third article larger than the tooth on the second article. The base of the ultimate article of the forcipule features a tubercle. The ventral surface features a deep forked groove on each sternite with two branches that form a right angle. A dense array of numerous minute pores cover the entire surface of the basal element of each of the ultimate legs.
