= Mecistocephalus waikaneus =

Scientific classification
- Kingdom: Animalia
- Phylum: Arthropoda
- Subphylum: Myriapoda
- Class: Chilopoda
- Order: Geophilomorpha
- Family: Mecistocephalidae
- Genus: Mecistocephalus
- Species: M. waikaneus

Binomial name
- Mecistocephalus waikaneus Chamberlin, 1953

Species of centipede

Mecistocephalus waikaneus is a species of soil centipede in the family Mecistocephalidae. This centipede is found in the Hawaiian Islands. This species features 49 pairs of legs and can reach 30 mm in length.

== Discovery ==
This species was first described in 1953 by American myriapodologist Ralph Vary Chamberlin. He based the original description of this species on two specimens collected in 1928. Both specimens were found in a rotten log at Waikane on the island of O'ahu in Hawaii.

== Description ==
This species features 49 leg-bearing segments and can reach 30 mm in length. The body is reddish yellow without dark patches, but the head and forcipules are chestnut. The body tapers toward the posterior end. The head is from 1.7 to 1.8 times as long as wide and shaped like a trapezoid that is narrower at the posterior end. The dorsal surface of the head features a curved frontal line. A longitudinal areolate band down the middle of the clypeus separates two smooth areas on the posterior part (plagulae). The areolate area on the anterior part of the clypeus is four times as long as the plagulae. The pleurite on each side of the head (bucca) features setae only on the posterior half as well as a short conical spiculum that points forward. The mandible features about seven pectinate lamellae (comb blades) with about six teeth on the first lamella and 10 to 15 teeth on an intermediate lamella. The coxosternite of the first maxillae is divided longitudinally down the middle, but the coxosternite of the second maxillae is undivided.

The forcipular tergum features two rows of setae in the middle and two lateral groups of setae. The first article of the forcipule features two teeth, the second and third articles each feature one tooth, and the ultimate article features two teeth, one dorsal and one ventral. The poison calyx of the forcipule extends to the distal part of the first article. The sternites lack pores but feature a forked groove with conspicuously short branches. In adults of this species, the basal element of each of the ultimate legs features about 20 pores on the ventral surface. The ultimate legs are slender, end in short spines, and exhibit no sexual dimorphism. The telson features a pair of anal pores.

This species exhibits many traits that characterize the genus Mecistocephalus. For example, the body in this species evidently tapers toward the rear, the head is evidently longer than wide and features a frontal line, the buccae feature setae and spicula, a longitudinal areolate stripe in the middle of the clypeus separates the two plagulae, the trunk sternites feature a longitudinal groove, and the ultimate legs are slender without sexual dimorphism. Furthermore, the coxosternite of the first maxillae is divided, but the coxosternite of the second maxillae is undivided.

This species shares a more extensive set of distinctive traits with another species in the same genus, M. maxillaris, which is also found in Hawaii. For example, each of these two species features 49 leg pairs, buccae with setae on only the posterior half, a poison calyx extending to the distal part of the first article of the forcipule, a forked groove on the sternites, and ultimate legs ending in short spines. Furthermore, these two species feature the same number of lamellae and teeth on the mandibles. Moreover, the forcipule in each of these species features two teeth on the first article, one tooth on each of the intermediate articles, and two teeth on the ultimate article, one dorsal and one ventral.

The species M. waikaneus can be distinguished from M. maxillaris, however, based on other traits. For example, the forcipular tergum features setae in M. waikaneus but not in M. maxillaris. Furthermore, the anterior branches of the groove on the sternites are notably short in M. waikaneus but long in M. maxillaris. Moreover, the basal element of each of the ultimate legs feature about 40 ventral pores in adults of the species M. maxillaris but only about 20 ventral pores in adults of the species M. waikaneus.

== Distribution and habitats ==
The species M. waikaneus is known only from Hawaiian Islands, where this centipede has been recorded on the islands of Hawai'i, Maui, and O'ahu. This species is usually found in forested habitats. On the island of Hawai'i, this centipede has been found in forests between sea level and an elevation of 305 meters. On the island of Maui, this centipede has been found in wet litter among trees including Pandanus at elevations from 50 to 75 meters in the Kipahulu valley. On the island of O'ahu, this centipede has been found in litter at the Manoa Falls Trail head, on the slopes of Mount Tantalus, in a Norfolk pine grove by a stream near Nu‘uanu Pali, and in the neighborhood of Makiki in Honolulu,
