= Mecistocephalus tsenapus =

Scientific classification
- Kingdom: Animalia
- Phylum: Arthropoda
- Subphylum: Myriapoda
- Class: Chilopoda
- Order: Geophilomorpha
- Family: Mecistocephalidae
- Genus: Mecistocephalus
- Species: M. tsenapus

Binomial name
- Mecistocephalus tsenapus Chamberlin, 1944

Species of centipede

Mecistocephalus tsenapus is a species of soil centipede in the Mecistocephalidae family. This centipede is found on the island of New Guinea. This species features 49 pairs of legs and can reach about 16 mm in length.

== Discovery and distribution ==
This species was first described in 1944 by the American myriapodologist Ralph Vary Chamberlin. He based the original description of this species on a holotype found in 1929 by the American zoologist Karl Patterson Schmidt in the Tsenap Hills by the upper Sepik River in Papua New Guinea. This species is known only from Papua New Guinea.

== Description ==
This species features 49 leg pairs and can reach about 16 mm in length. The dorsal surface of the body is mostly light brown with a pale longitudinal line down the middle. The head and forcipules are darker with a chestnut background. The dorsal plate on the head is 1.67 times as long as wide and features a frontal line that is uniformly curved. The areolate area on the anterior part of the clypeus is longer than the smooth areas on the posterior part. The middle part of the labrum narrows toward the posterior end, which extends beyond the posterior margins of the side pieces. The posterior margin of each side piece of the labrum is smooth.

The first article of the forcipule features a rounded tooth at the distal end but only the vestige of a more proximal tooth. The second article of the forcipule lacks a tooth, but the third article features a small tooth. The base of the ultimate article of the forcipule features a short tubercle. The groove on the sternites is long and only sometimes forked, with two faint branches forming an acute angle. The inner and posterior edges of the basal elements of the ultimate legs lack pores.
