= Mecistocephalus gigas =

Scientific classification
- Kingdom: Animalia
- Phylum: Arthropoda
- Subphylum: Myriapoda
- Class: Chilopoda
- Order: Geophilomorpha
- Family: Mecistocephalidae
- Genus: Mecistocephalus
- Species: M. gigas

Binomial name
- Mecistocephalus gigas Haase, 1887

Species of centipede

Mecistocephalus gigas is a species of soil centipede in the Mecistocephalidae family. This centipede is found in Papua New Guinea and Indonesia. This centipede features 51 pairs of legs rather than the 49 leg pairs usually observed in the genus Mecistocephalus.

== Discovery and taxonomy ==
This species was first described as Mecistocephalus gigas in 1887 by German zoologist Erich Haase based on a single female specimen found on or near the island of New Guinea. In 1915, the Austrian myriapodologist Carl Attems placed this species in the genus Lamnonyx instead, followed in 1919 by the Italian myriapodologist Filippo Silvestri. In 1920, however, the American biologist Ralph V. Chamberlin placed this species in the genus Dasyptyx instead. Authorities now deem both Lamnonyx and Dasyptyx to be junior synonyms of Mecistocephalus.

== Distribution ==
The centipede is found on the island of New Guinea and in the Maluku Islands of Indonesia. On the island of New Guinea, for example, this species has been recorded near the Sepik river. On the Maluku Islands, this species has been recorded not only in West Seram on the island of Seram in the province of North Maluku but also on the island of Halmahera in the province of Maluku.

== Description ==
This species has 51 pairs of legs and can reach 105 mm in length. The head is a dark brownish red, but the trunk is yellow with finely distributed grains of dark pigment. The dorsal surface of the posterior segments are black-green with small grains of pigment, which are quite conspicuous on the ultimate legs.

The head is almost twice as long as wide. The pleurites on the side of the head are covered with bristles. The posterior end of the dorsal plate on the head is narrow and convex. The labrum features fine setae. The coxosternite of the first maxillae is divided down the middle by a longitudinal suture, but the coxosternite of the second maxillae is not. Each of the telopodites of the second maxillae extends distinctly beyond the first maxillae and ends in a short but stout claw. The number of pectinate lamellae (comb blades) on the mandibles ranges from 21 to 27, with four or five teeth on the first. The first article of the forcipules features a pair of small teeth, and the ultimate article features a small basal tubercle.

The first pair of legs are about two-thirds as long as the second pair. The longitudinal ridge in the middle of each sternite is forked at the anterior end. The body tapers gradually toward the posterior end. The sternite of the last leg-bearing segment is shaped like a trapezoid. The basal elements of the ultimate legs feature numerous small pores of varying size. The ultimate legs are twice as long as the penultimate pair of legs. The telson features large anal pores.

This species exhibits many traits that characterize the genus Mecistocephalus. For example, the head is obviously longer than wide, the pleurites on the side of the head feature setae, the coxosternite of the first maxillae is divided by a longitudinal suture, the coxosternite of the second maxillae is undivided, the second maxillae reach distinctly beyond the first maxillae and feature claws, the first leg pair is markedly reduced in size, and the body evidently tapers backwards. Furthermore, like many other species in this genus, this species features two teeth on the first article of the forcipules.

This species shares a more extensive set of distinctive traits with another species in the same genus, M. psuestes, which is also found on the island of New Guinea. For example, like the species M. gigas, the species M. psuestes features 51 leg pairs and furrows on the sternites that are forked at the anterior end. Furthermore, in both of these species, each of the lamellae on the mandible bears teeth only at the distal end and features a long stalk bearing a row of cilia instead of teeth. Authorities placed both M. psuestes and M. gigas in the taxon Dasyptyx, first proposed as a genus, then deemed a subgenus, based on this feature of the mandible. Moreover, the mandibles in these two species feature similar numbers of lamellae and teeth.

The species M. gigas can be distinguished from M. psuestes, however, based on other traits. For example, the posterior margins of the side pieces of the labrum are curved and concave in M. psuestes but mostly straight in M. gigas. Furthermore, each margin forms an acute angle at the inner corner that protrudes conspicuously beyond the posterior end of the middle piece in M. psuestes, whereas these corners remain close to the posterior end of the middle piece in M. gigas. Moreover, the teeth on the lamellae of the mandible are longer in M. psuestes than in M. gigas.
