= Mecistocephalus nagasaunus =

Scientific classification
- Kingdom: Animalia
- Phylum: Arthropoda
- Subphylum: Myriapoda
- Class: Chilopoda
- Order: Geophilomorpha
- Family: Mecistocephalidae
- Genus: Mecistocephalus
- Species: M. nagasaunus

Binomial name
- Mecistocephalus nagasaunus Chamberlin, 1920

Species of centipede

Mecistocephalus nagasaunus is a species of soil centipede in the Mecistocephalidae family. This centipede is found in Fiji. This species features 49 pairs of legs and can reach about 23 mm in length.

== Discovery and distribution ==
This species was first described in 1920 by the American myriapodologist Ralph Vary Chamberlin. He based the original description of this species on a holotype found by the American zoologist William M. Mann at Nagasau in Fiji. This holotype is deposited in the Museum of Comparative Zoology at Harvard University. The species is known only from Fiji.

== Description ==
This species features 49 leg pairs of legs and can reach about 23 mm in length. The body is fulvous but more orange near the head, which is dark orange or light chestnut. The head is 1.6 times as long as wide. The areolate area on the anterior part of the clypeus is longer than the two smooth areas on the posterior part. The posterior margin of the labrum is smooth. The mandible features six lamellae, with six teeth on the first lamella and fifteen on a typical middle lamella. The teeth on a middle lamella are all long, with the proximal teeth just as long as the distal teeth.

The first article of the forcipule features two teeth that are broad, short, and rounded, with the distal tooth larger than the proximal tooth. The second and third articles each feature a tooth, but the ultimate article lacks a distinct tooth. The groove on the sternites is forked, with the branches forming an obtuse angle, but the branches are short. The sternite of the last leg-bearing segment is broad at the anterior margin but narrows toward the rear, shaped almost like a triangle with a rounded posterior end. The basal element of each of the ultimate legs features 20 small pores, including about 12 on the ventral surface. The ultimate legs are about twice as long as the penultimate legs. The telson features distinct anal pores.
