= Mecistocephalus hebrides =

Scientific classification
- Kingdom: Animalia
- Phylum: Arthropoda
- Subphylum: Myriapoda
- Class: Chilopoda
- Order: Geophilomorpha
- Family: Mecistocephalidae
- Genus: Mecistocephalus
- Species: M. hebrides

Binomial name
- Mecistocephalus hebrides (Chamberlin, 1944)

Synonyms
- Dasyptyx hebrides Chamberlin, 1920

Species of centipede

Mecistocephalus hebrides is a species of soil centipede in the family Mecistocephalidae. This centipede is found in Vanuatu. This species can reach about 62 mm in length and features 49 pairs of legs.

== Discovery and distribution ==
This species was first described in 1944 by American myriapodologist Ralph Vary Chamberlin. He based the original description of this species on a holotype found in 1929 by the American zoologist Karl Patterson Schmidt in the village of Hog Harbour on the island of Espiritu Santo in what was then New Hebrides but is now Vanuatu. This species is known only from Vanuatu.

== Taxonomy ==
Chamberlin originally described this centipede under the name Dasyptyx hebrides. In 2003, authorities suggested that Dasyptyx is a junior synonym of Mecistocephalus. Authorities now regard Mecistocephalus as the valid name for Dasyptyx.

== Description ==
This species can reach about 62 mm in length and features 49 leg pairs. The dorsal surface of the body is brownish with a pale longitudinal line down the middle. A network of lines and spots cover the back and sides. The head and forcipules are chestnut. The head is 1.6 times as long as wide. The middle piece of the labrum is wider along the anterior margin than the posterior end. The mandible features sixteen lamellae.

The first article of the forcipule features two teeth, with the distal tooth shaped like a cone and much larger than the more proximal tooth. The tooth on the second article of the forcipule is either tiny or absent, and the third article features a tooth that is larger but still very small. The ultimate article of the forcipule features a bulge at the base. The groove on the sternites is forked with the two branches forming an obtuse angle. The basal element of each of the ultimate legs features very numerous small pores that are absent from a narrow band along the inner edge.
