= Mecistocephalus manokwarius =

Scientific classification
- Kingdom: Animalia
- Phylum: Arthropoda
- Subphylum: Myriapoda
- Class: Chilopoda
- Order: Geophilomorpha
- Family: Mecistocephalidae
- Genus: Mecistocephalus
- Species: M. manokwarius

Binomial name
- Mecistocephalus manokwarius Chamberlin, 1944

Species of centipede

Mecistocephalus manokwarius is a species of soil centipede in the family Mecistocephalidae. This centipede is found in Indonesia on the island of New Guinea. This species features 49 pairs of legs and can reach about 44 mm in length.

== Discovery and distribution ==
This species was first described in 1944 by the American myriapodologist Ralph Vary Chamberlin. He based the original description of this species on a holotype found in 1929 by the American zoologist Karl Patterson Schmidt in Manokwari on the Bird's Head Peninsula of Western New Guinea. This species is known only from Western New Guinea.

== Description ==
This species is brown, has 49 leg pairs, and can reach about 44 mm in length. The body is brown, whereas the head and forcipules are chestnut. The dorsal plate on the head is 1.66 times as long as wide and features a frontal line. The areolate area on the anterior part of the clypeus is slightly shorter than the smooth areas on the posterior part. The middle piece of the labrum narrows from the anterior margin to the middle and then is of uniform width until the rounded posterior end. The posterior margin of each side piece of the labrum is almost straight from the outer corner to the inner corner, which forms an acute angle slightly beyond the posterior end of the adjacent middle piece. The mandible features seven lamellae, with eight teeth on the first lamella.

The first article of the forcipule features two sharp teeth, with the tooth at the distal end somewhat smaller than the more proximal tooth. The second and third articles each feature a tooth like the proximal tooth on the first article in terms of shape and size. The base of the ultimate article features a small tubercle. The groove on the sternites is forked at the anterior end with two short branches that form a slightly obtuse angle. Both the dorsal and ventral surfaces of the basal element of each of the ultimate legs are covered with very numerous small pores.
