= Mecistocephalus modestus =

Scientific classification
- Kingdom: Animalia
- Phylum: Arthropoda
- Subphylum: Myriapoda
- Class: Chilopoda
- Order: Geophilomorpha
- Family: Mecistocephalidae
- Genus: Mecistocephalus
- Species: M. modestus

Binomial name
- Mecistocephalus modestus (Silvestri, 1919)

Synonyms
- Lamnonyx modestus Silvestri, 1919

Species of centipede

Mecistocephalus modestus is a species of soil centipede in the Mecistocephalidae family. This centipede is found in Indonesia, Timor-Leste, and Papua New Guinea. This species has 49 pairs of legs and can reach 35 mm in length.

== Discovery ==
This species was first described in 1919 by the Italian myriapodologist Filippo Silvestri. He based the original description of this species on specimens including both sexes. These specimens were found under leaves and in rotting trees in the village of Sattelberg in Morobe Province in Papua New Guinea.

== Taxonomy ==
Silvestri originally described this species under the name Lamnonyx modestus. In 1920, however, the American biologist Ralph V. Chamberlin placed this species in the genus Mecistocephalus instead. Authorities now deem Lamnonyx to be a junior synonym of Mecistocephalus.

== Description ==
This species features 49 leg pairs and can reach 35 mm in length. The body is yellow with abundant darker pigment, and the head is light brown. The dorsal plate on the head is almost twice as long as wide. The mandible features five or six pectinate lamellae (comb blades), with seven teeth on a middle lamella. The forcipules feature two small teeth on the first article as well as small teeth on the second, third, and fourth articles. The first pair of legs are less than half as long as the second pair. The anterior sternites feature a groove in the posterior surface that is not forked at the anterior end. The sternite of the last leg-bearing segment is shaped like a trapezoid and densely covered with short bristles at the posterior end. The basal element of each of the ultimate legs features 15 to 17 pores on the ventral and lateral surfaces.

This species exhibits many traits that characterize the genus Mecistocephalus. For example, like other species in this genus, this species features a head that is evidently longer than wide, second maxillae that reach beyond the first maxillae, and a groove on the sternites of the trunk segments. Furthermore, like other species in this genus, this species also features a transverse frontal line on the dorsal surface of the head, a longitudinal areolate stripe down the middle of the clypeus, setae and spicula on the pleurites on each side of the head, a longitudinal suture dividing the coxosternite of the first maxillae down the middle, an undivided coxosternite of the second maxillae, and ultimate legs that are as slender in the male as in the female. Moreover, as in other species in this genus, the forcipular tergum in this species is only slightly wider than long and features a longitudinal groove in the middle.

This species shares more distinctive traits with another species in the same genus, M. apator, which is also found in Indonesia. For example, each of these species features 49 leg pairs, a head that is almost twice as long as wide, a straight anterior margin on the head, and forcipules with two teeth on the first article. Furthermore, in both species, each lamella on the mandible features a row of teeth that extends all the way to the base, the posterior margin of the labrum is completely devoid of bristles, the middle piece of the labrum is shaped like a narrow triangle with a vertex at the posterior end, the spicula are straight rather than curved like hooks, and the groove on the sternites is not forked.

The species M. modestus can be distinguished from M. apator, however, based on other traits. For example, the ultimate legs feature more pores in M. apator, which features about 25 pores on each leg, where M. modestus features only 15 to 17 pores. Furthermore, the mandible features more teeth in M. apator, which features seven lamellae on the mandible, with twelve teeth on a middle lamella, whereas M. modestus features five or six lamellae on the mandible, with only seven teeth on a middle lamella.

== Distribution ==
This species is found not only in Papua New Guinea on the island of New Guinea but also in Indonesia and East Timor. In Indonesia, this species has been found on the island of Java and in the province of Bali. On the island of Java, this species has been recorded in the district of Cibodas.
