= Mecistocephalus ocanus =

Scientific classification
- Kingdom: Animalia
- Phylum: Arthropoda
- Subphylum: Myriapoda
- Class: Chilopoda
- Order: Geophilomorpha
- Family: Mecistocephalidae
- Genus: Mecistocephalus
- Species: M. ocanus

Binomial name
- Mecistocephalus ocanus Chamberlin, 1946

Species of centipede

Mecistocephalus ocanus is a species of soil centipede in the family Mecistocephalidae. This centipede is found in Guam in Micronesia. This species can reach about 15 mm in length and features 49 pairs of legs.

== Discovery and distribution ==
This species was first described in 1946 by the American myriapodologist Ralph Vary Chamberlin. He based the original description of this species on a specimen found in 1945 at Oca Point in Guam. This species is endemic to Guam.

== Description ==
This species can reach about 15 mm in length and features 49 leg pairs. The head is 1.5 times as long as wide, and the dorsal plate on the head features a frontal line that is uniformly curved. The areolate area on the anterior part of the clypeus is distinctly longer than the smooth area. The first lamella on the mandible features five long teeth. The anterior corners of the coxosternite of the first maxillae form points that project toward the front. The second maxillae are long and curve beyond the first maxillae. The distal end of each of the second maxilae feature a small claw and a moderate number of setae. The first article of the forcipule features two distinct but rounded teeth, and the second and third articles each feature a distinct but rounded tooth, but the ultimate article lacks a tooth. The basal elements of the ultimate legs feature a moderate number of small pores.
