= Mecistocephalus consocius =

Scientific classification
- Kingdom: Animalia
- Phylum: Arthropoda
- Subphylum: Myriapoda
- Class: Chilopoda
- Order: Geophilomorpha
- Family: Mecistocephalidae
- Genus: Mecistocephalus
- Species: M. consocius

Binomial name
- Mecistocephalus consocius Chamberlin, 1944

Species of centipede

Mecistocephalus consocius is a species of soil centipede in the family Mecistocephalidae. This centipede is found in Vanuatu. This species features 49 pairs of legs.

== Discovery and distribution ==
This species was first described in 1944 by the American myriapodologist Ralph Vary Chamberlin. He based the original description of this species on a holotype found in 1929 by the American zoologist Karl Patterson Schmidt in the village of Hog Harbour on the island of Espiritu Santo in what was then New Hebrides but is now Vanuatu. This species is known only from Vanuatu.

== Description ==
This species features 49 leg pairs and is small or medium in size. The body is yellowish, but the head and forcipules are light chestnut. The dorsal plate on the head features a frontal line and is 1.67 times as long as its maximum width. The areolate area on the anterior part of the clypeus is longer than the smooth areas on the posterior part. The posterior end of the middle piece of the labrum is even with or extends slightly beyond the posterior margins of the side pieces.

The first article of the forcipule features two teeth with the distal tooth rounded at the tip and much larger than the more proximal tooth. The second article of the forcipule either lacks a tooth or features only a mere vestige of a tooth. The third article of the forcipule features a small blunt tooth. The base of the ultimate article of the forcipule features a short obtuse tubercle. The longitudinal groove on the sternites is not forked at the anterior end.
