= Mecistocephalus diversisternus =

Scientific classification
- Kingdom: Animalia
- Phylum: Arthropoda
- Subphylum: Myriapoda
- Class: Chilopoda
- Order: Geophilomorpha
- Family: Mecistocephalidae
- Genus: Mecistocephalus
- Species: M. diversisternus

Binomial name
- Mecistocephalus diversisternus (Silvestri, 1919)

Synonyms
- Lamnonyx diversisternus Silvestri, 1919; Mecistocephalus takakuwai Verhoeff, 1934

Species of centipede

Mecistocephalus diversisternus is a species of soil centipede in the family Mecistocephalidae. This centipede is notable for featuring 57 or 59 pairs of legs rather than the 49 leg pairs usually observed in the genus Mecistocephalus. This centipede is one of only a few species in the genus Mecistocephalus or in the family Mecistocephalidae with more than 55 leg pairs. This centipede is also one of only a few species in this family to exhibit any variation in leg number among specimens. This species is found from the island of Honshu in Japan to Taiwan.

== Discovery and taxonomy ==
This species was first described under the name Lamnonyx diversisternus in 1919 by the Italian zoologist Filippo Silvestri based on a male holotype with 57 pairs of legs, which he collected on the island of Honshu in Japan. The type material is deposited in the Museo Civico di Storia Naturale Giacomo Doria in Genoa, Italy. In 1920, the American biologist Ralph V. Chamberlain placed this species in the genus Mecistocephalus. Authorities now consider Lamnonyx to be a junior synonym of Mecistocephalus.

In 1934, the German zoologist Karl W. Verhoeff described Mecistocephalus takakuwai as a new species with 59 pairs of legs. He based the original description of this centipede on ten specimens including both sexes. These specimens were collected near Tokyo on the island of Honshu in Japan.

Until 2007, authorities considered M. diversisternus and M. takakuwai to be different species with different numbers of legs, largely based on the presumed absence of variation in leg number within species in the family Mecistocephalidae. The discovery in 2001 of variation in leg number in the species M. microporus, however, prompted a reconsideration of the diagnostic value of leg number in this family. The Italian biologists Marco Uliana, Lucio Bonato, and Alessandro Minelli examined 37 specimens, including a female with 57 leg pairs and specimens of both sexes with 59 leg pairs, and after a review of the literature, found no basis for distinguishing M. diversisternus and M. takakuwai other than leg number. Noting the overlapping geographic distributions of these two nominal species, Uliana, Bonato, and Minelli concluded in 2007 that these centipedes belong to the same species. Authorities now deem M. takakuwai to be a junior synonym of M. diversisternus, but some continue to list M. takakuwai as a valid species.

== Distribution ==
This species has been found in not only on the islands of Honshu, Shikoku, and Kyushu, and the Ryukyu Islands in Japan but also in Taiwan. Specimens with 59 leg pairs have been recorded throughout this range. Specimens with 57 leg pairs have been recorded from Honshu, the Ryukyu Islands, and Taiwan.

== Phylogeny ==
A phylogenetic analysis of the family Mecistocephalidae based on morphology places the species M. diversisternus in a clade with the species M. japonicus. Similarly, a phylogenetic analysis of ten Mecistocephalus species based on molecular data identifies M. japonicus as the closest relative of M. diversisternus in a phylogenetic tree. The species M. japonicus features 63 or 65 pairs of legs and is also found from Honshu to Taiwan, including Shikoku, Kyushu, and the Ryukyu Islands.

Phylogenetic analysis based on molecular evidence not only places the species M. diversisternus and M. japonicus together in a clade but also places the species M. smithii in a sister group for this clade. The species M. smithii is found in mainland China and features 59 pairs of legs. The closely related M. smithii is similar enough to M. diversisternus for specimens of M. diversisternus found in Japan and Taiwan to be mistakenly identified as specimens of M. smithii.

== Description ==
This species can have either 57 or 59 pairs of legs in each sex. The adults range from 2.5 cm to 5.5 cm in length. The body is orange without dark patches, but the forcipular segment and the head are darker. The head is 1.7 to 2.0 times longer than wide, and the antennae are 4.2 to 5.0 times as long as the head is wide. The pleurites on the sides of the head feature spicula but lack setae. The clypeus is 1.6 to 1.9 times wider than long and features three or four setae on each side, sometimes with other short setae on the larger specimens. Each of the second maxillae features an apical claw. The exposed part of the forcipular sternum is 1.1 to 1.4 times wider than long. The first article of the forcipules each feature a basal tooth about as large as the distal tooth, the second and third articles each feature a single tooth, and the ultimate article features two small basal teeth, one dorsal relative to the other. The sternites feature a furrow without apparent bifurcation. The ventral sides of the ultimate legs feature dense short setae in each sex, but these legs lack an apical spine.

This species exhibits many traits shared with other Mecistocephalus species. For example, like other centipedes in the same genus, this species features an elongated head with spicula and second maxillae ending in claws. Furthermore, the first article of the forcipule features two teeth, one distal relative to the other.

This species shares an especially extensive set of traits with its closest relative, M. japonicus. For example, both species feature trunks without dark patches and cephalic pleurites without setae. Furthermore, both species feature a furrow on their sternites that is not forked. These close relatives, however, can be distinguished based on other traits. For example, M. japonicus not only features more legs (63 or 65 pairs) than M. diversisternus but also is much larger, with adults that range from 7 cm to 17 cm in length. Furthermore, the side of the clypeus in M. japonicus features 20 to 30 setae where M. diversisternus features only a few. Moreover, the clypeus in M. japonicus is wider relative to its length, with a width/length ratio that ranges from 1.9 to 2.2, greater than that observed in M. diversisternus.

The species M. diversisternus also resembles its close relative M. smithii. For example, both of these species include specimens with 59 leg pairs, and the cephalic pleurites in both species lack setae. These two species can be distinguished, however, based on other traits. For example, the side of the clypeus in M. smithii features 20 to 22 setae where M. diversisternus features only a few. Furthermore, the furrow on the sternites on the anterior leg-bearing segments in M. smithii is forked with short branches, whereas the sternal furrow in M. diversisternus is not forked. Moreover, M. smithii is also larger, ranging from 7.4 cm to 8.8 cm in length.
