= Mecistocephalus nannocornis =

Scientific classification
- Kingdom: Animalia
- Phylum: Arthropoda
- Subphylum: Myriapoda
- Class: Chilopoda
- Order: Geophilomorpha
- Family: Mecistocephalidae
- Genus: Mecistocephalus
- Species: M. nannocornis

Binomial name
- Mecistocephalus nannocornis Chamberlin, 1920

Species of centipede

Mecistocephalus nannocornis is a species of soil centipede in the Mecistocephalidae family. This centipede has only 45 pairs of legs, the minimum number recorded in the genus Mecistocephalus. This centipede was the second species in this genus to be discovered with such a modest number of legs.

== Discovery and taxonomy ==
This species was first described in 1920 by the American biologist Ralph V. Chamberlin. He based the original description of this species on a female holotype found by the American biologist Charles F. Baker on Mount Makiling on the island of Luzon in the Philippines. This holotype is deposited in the Museum of Comparative Zoology at Harvard University.

In 1961, the Japanese myriapodologist Keizaburo Shinohara described M. manazurensis as a new species in the same genus. Shinohara based this description on specimens collected from the town of Manazuru in the Kanagawa prefecture on the island of Honshu in Japan. In 2007, the Italian biologists Marco Uliana, Lucio Bonato, and Alessandro Minelli deemed M. manazurensis to be a junior synonym of M. nannocornis. Some references consider these centipedes to be the same species, but others continue to list both as valid species, although some also acknowledge that these centipedes are probably the same species.

== Distribution ==
This centipede is found not only in the Philippines but also in Taiwan and Singapore. In Singapore, this species has been recorded in the Bukit Timah area. Including M. manazurensis as a junior synonym, M. nannocornis is also found on the island of Honshu in Japan.

== Phylogeny ==
A phylogenetic analysis of the family Mecistocephalidae based on morphology places M. nannocornis in a clade with M. spissus, which was the first species in the genus Mecistocephalus to be discovered with only 45 leg-bearing segments. This analysis also places this clade on the most basal branch of a phylogenetic tree of this genus, with a sister group formed by all the other species in this genus. This study places these two species together in a clade on the most basal branch based on similar morphology even when the analysis excludes features related to the number of segments. This study also suggests that the common ancestor of the centipedes in this genus had 45 leg pairs and that the species in the sister group evolved through a process that added segments and increased the number of legs.

== Description ==
The species M. nannocornis features 45 leg-bearing segments and can reach 27 mm in length. The body is orange with dark patches in at least some specimens; the head and forcipular segment is also darker. The head is longer than wide, with a length/width ratio of about 1.5. The antennae are about 2.5 times longer than the head is wide. The pleurites on the side of the head (buccae) feature setae on the posterior half only. The mandible features about seven or eight lamellae, the first lamella with six or seven teeth, but the intermediate lamellae with an average of ten to twelve teeth. Each of the second maxillae ends in a claw.

The sternites of the leg-bearing segments feature a longitudinal groove down the middle that is not forked at the anterior end. The sternite of the last leg-bearing segment is shaped like a trapezoid that is slightly wider than long, with a width/length ratio of 1.1, but with a lobe projecting at the posterior end. The basal element of each ultimate leg features about 30 pores of moderate size.

This species shares many traits with other species in the genus Mecistocephalus. For example, the head in this species is evidently longer than wide, the buccae feature setae, and a spiculum projects from each side of the head. Furthermore, each of the second maxillae in this species features an apical claw, and the trunk sternites feature a longitudinal groove. Moreover, the coxosternite of the first maxillae is divided, but the coxosternite of the second maxillae is undivided.

This species shares more distinctive traits with its close relative M. spissus. For example, both of these species feature only 45 leg pairs, buccae with setae on the posterior half only, a tooth on the third article of the forcipule, and a groove on the sternites of the leg-bearing segments that is not forked. Furthermore, the sternite of the last leg-bearing segment in each of these species lacks lateral notches but features a short posterior projection shaped like a pillow. Moreover, the first article of the forcipule in these species is relatively stout, with a length/width ratio in the range of only 1.3 to 1.6.

The species M. nannocornis can be distinguished from its close relative M. spissus, however, based on some clear differences in morphology. For example, the species M. spissus features a greater number of teeth on the forcipules, with two on the first article, one on the second, and two (one ventral and one dorsal) on the fourth. The species M. nannocornis has only one distal tooth on the first article, a tubercle on the second, and no distinct tooth on the fourth. Furthermore, the species M. spissus has a more elongated head, with a length/width ratio of 1.7 to 1.8, whereas the species M. nannocornis has a relatively short head, with a length/width ratio of only about 1.5.
