= Mecistocephalus heteropus =

Scientific classification
- Kingdom: Animalia
- Phylum: Arthropoda
- Subphylum: Myriapoda
- Class: Chilopoda
- Order: Geophilomorpha
- Family: Mecistocephalidae
- Genus: Mecistocephalus
- Species: M. heteropus

Binomial name
- Mecistocephalus heteropus Humbert, 1865

Species of centipede

Mecistocephalus heteropus is a species of soil centipede in the family Mecistocephalidae. This centipede is found in Sri Lanka. This species features 49 pairs of legs and can reach 85 mm in length.

== Discovery and distribution ==
This species was first described in 1865 by the Swiss naturalist Aloïs Humbert based on type material found in the Pundel-Oya valley in Sri Lanka. This centipede is endemic to Sri Lanka. In Sri Lanka, this species has also been recorded in the village of Pattipola and at an elevation of 7,000 feet on the Horton Plains.

== Taxonomy ==
Humbert originally described this centipede as a new species under the name Mecistocephalus heteropus. In 1919, the Italian myriapodologist Filippo Silvestri deemed this centipede to be a subspecies of the species Lamnonyx punctifrons. In 1929, the Austrian myriapodologist Carl Attems placed this species and its subspecies in the genus Mecistocephalus instead. Authorities now deem Lamnonyx to be a junior synonym of Mecistocephalus and accept M. heteropus as a valid species.

== Description ==
This species features 49 leg pairs and can reach 85 mm in length and 3 mm in width. The dorsal surface of most of the body is a brownish ochre, and the head, antennae, and the dorsal surface of the first five or six segments are a reddish brown. The legs and ventral surface of the body are reddish. The distal half of the ultimate article of the forcipules is black.

The dorsal plate on the head is slightly less than twice as long as wide. The mandible features twelve pectinate lamellae (comb blades), with seven teeth on the first lamella and 25 to 30 teeth on a middle lamella. The proximal teeth are much smaller than the distal teeth on all lamellae but the first. The inner margin of the mandible features fine serrations below the first lamella. The groove on the sternites of the anterior segments is forked, with the two branches forming an acute angle on the tenth segment.
