= Mecistocephalus gracilis =

Scientific classification
- Kingdom: Animalia
- Phylum: Arthropoda
- Subphylum: Myriapoda
- Class: Chilopoda
- Order: Geophilomorpha
- Family: Mecistocephalidae
- Genus: Mecistocephalus
- Species: M. gracilis

Binomial name
- Mecistocephalus gracilis (Verhoeff, 1925)

Synonyms
- Lamnonyx gracilis Verhoeff, 1925

Species of centipede

Mecistocephalus gracilis is a species of centipede in the Mecistocephalidae family. It is endemic to Australia, and was first described in 1925 by German myriapodologist Karl Wilhelm Verhoeff.

== Description ==
This centipede ranges from 34 mm to 39 mm in length. This centipede is pale with an unusually slender body that tapers toward the rear. This species features 47 pairs of legs. The entire anterior part of the clypeus is areolate. The ridges on the sternites are long and forked at the anterior end. The basal elements of the ultimate legs have only a few large pores.

== Distribution ==
The species occurs in the Kimberley district of far north Western Australia.

== Behaviour ==
The centipedes are solitary terrestrial predators that inhabit plant litter and soil.
