= Mecistocephalus nigriceps =

Scientific classification
- Kingdom: Animalia
- Phylum: Arthropoda
- Subphylum: Myriapoda
- Class: Chilopoda
- Order: Geophilomorpha
- Family: Mecistocephalidae
- Genus: Mecistocephalus
- Species: M. nigriceps

Binomial name
- Mecistocephalus nigriceps Chamberlin, 1920

Species of centipede

Mecistocephalus nigriceps is a species of soil centipede in the family Mecistocephalidae. This centipede is found in Fiji and Solomon Islands. This species features 49 pairs of legs and can reach 45 mm in length.

== Discovery ==
This species was first described in 1920 by the American myriapodologist Ralph Vary Chamberlin. He based the original description of this species on a holotype and 17 paratypes found by the American zoologist William M. Mann. The holotype was found in the district of Nadarivatu in Fiji, whereas the paratypes were found at this type locality as well as many other sites. The holotype and paratypes are deposited in the Museum of Comparative Zoology at Harvard University.

== Description ==
This species features 49 leg pairs and can reach 45 mm in length. The dorsal surface of the body is mostly brownish with darker bands at the posterior border of a typical tergite. The head, antennae, forcipules, and anterior tergites are generally black. The head is 1.88 times as long as wide. The head is widest at the anterior margin and narrows toward a truncated posterior end. A frontal line is evident on the dorsal surface of the head. The posterior margins of the side pieces of the labrum are smooth. The mandible features nine lamellae with teeth all the way to the base, where the teeth are smaller than at the distal end. The first lamella features only five teeth.

The first article of the forcipule features not only a distal tooth that is long, stout, blunt, and black, but also a proximal tooth that is smaller. The second and third articles of the forcipule feature nodules or teeth that are blunt, rounded, and black. The base of the ultimate article features a tooth that is shaped like a small cone. The ventral surface features a deep longitudinal groove in the middle of the posterior two-thirds of each sternite. This groove forks into two faint branches. The telson features distinct anal pores.

== Distribution ==
This centipede is found not only in Fiji but also Solomon Islands. In Fiji, this species has been recorded not only at the type locality (Nadarivatu) but also elsewhere, including Lakeba Lau, Labasa, Somosomo, Lomati, Nansori, Waiyanitu, Vanua Ava, Vunisia, Suva, Turuca, Nasago, Kabasa Lau, Nadala, Nasoqo, and Lasema. In Solomon Islands, this species has been recorded in Auki, Pamua, and Fulakora, and the Nggela Islands.
