= Mecistocephalus mater =

Scientific classification
- Kingdom: Animalia
- Phylum: Arthropoda
- Subphylum: Myriapoda
- Class: Chilopoda
- Order: Geophilomorpha
- Family: Mecistocephalidae
- Genus: Mecistocephalus
- Species: M. mater

Binomial name
- Mecistocephalus mater (Verhoeff, 1925)

Synonyms
- Lamnonyx mater Verhoeff, 1925

Species of centipede

Mecistocephalus mater is a species of soil centipede in the family Mecistocephalidae. This centipede is endemic to Australia. This species features 49 pairs of legs and can reach 63 mm in length.

== Discovery and distribution ==
This species was first described in 1925 by the German myriapodologist Karl Wilhelm Verhoeff. He based the original description of this species on multiple specimens found at Cedar Creek and Atherton in Queensland in Australia. This species is known only from coastal northeastern Queensland.

== Taxonomy ==
Verhoeff originally described this species under the name Lamnonyx mater. In 1929, the Austrian myriapodologist Carl Attems placed this species in the genus Mecistocephalus instead. Authorities now deem Lamnonyx to be a junior synonym and consider Mecistocephalus the valid name for Lamnonyx.

== Description ==
This species features 49 leg pairs and ranges from 40 mm to 63 mm in length. The anterior part of the clypeus is areolate, but this reticulation is weaker in an area shaped like a diamond in the middle of the clypeus. The anterior corners of the coxosternite of the first maxillae project like teeth. The sternites on anterior trunk segments feature a groove that is forked at the anterior end. The basal element of each of the ultimate legs features numerous pores, including large, medium, and small pores, scattered over most of the surface.

== Ecology ==
This centipede is a solitary terrestrial predator that inhabits plant litter and soil.
