= Mecistocephalus subinsularis =

Scientific classification
- Kingdom: Animalia
- Phylum: Arthropoda
- Subphylum: Myriapoda
- Class: Chilopoda
- Order: Geophilomorpha
- Family: Mecistocephalidae
- Genus: Mecistocephalus
- Species: M. subinsularis

Binomial name
- Mecistocephalus subinsularis (Silvestri,1919)

Synonyms
- Lamnonyx subinsularis Cook, 1896

Species of centipede

Mecistocephalus subinsularis is a species of soil centipede in the family Mecistocephalidae. This centipede is found in Myanmar, Sri Lanka, Vietnam, and on the island of Sumatra in Indonesia. This species features 49 pairs of legs and can exceed 40 mm in length.

== Taxonomy and distribution ==
This centipede was first described in 1919 by the Italian myriapodologist Filippo Silvestri. He originally described this centipede as a subspecies of the species Lamnonyx cephalotes. He based the original description of this centipede on specimens found in Myeik in Myanmar, Madatugama in Sri Lanka, and Hanoi in Vietnam, as well as on Mount Singgalang in Sumatra. Authorities now deem Lamnonyx to be a junior synonym of Mecistocephalus and accept M. subinsularis as a valid species.

== Description ==
This species features 49 leg pairs and can exceed 40 mm in length. The proximal teeth on the pectinate lamellae (comb blades) of the mandibles are slightly smaller than the distal teeth. The groove on the sternites on the anterior segments is forked with two branches forming a very obtuse angle.
