= Mecistocephalus erythroceps =

Scientific classification
- Kingdom: Animalia
- Phylum: Arthropoda
- Subphylum: Myriapoda
- Class: Chilopoda
- Order: Geophilomorpha
- Family: Mecistocephalidae
- Genus: Mecistocephalus
- Species: M. erythroceps

Binomial name
- Mecistocephalus erythroceps Chamberlin, 1920

Species of centipede

Mecistocephalus erythroceps is a species of centipede in the Mecistocephalidae family. This centipede is notable for featuring 51 pairs of legs rather than the 49 leg pairs usually observed in the genus Mecistocephalus. This species is found in Fiji.

== Discovery and distribution ==
This species was originally described in 1920 by the American myriapodologist Ralph Vary Chamberlin. He based the original description of this species on specimens collected by the American zoologist William M. Mann in Fiji. Mann found the holotype and a paratype in the district of Nadarivatu on the island of Viti Levu and another paratype at Levuka on the island of Ovalau. The holotype and two paratypes are deposited at the Museum of Comparative Zoology at Harvard University. This species is known only from Fiji.

== Description ==
This species has 51 pairs of legs and can reach 31 mm in length. The body is a uniform pale yellow with a reddish head. The body is slender, with a uniform width for the anterior half but attenuated over the posterior half. The head features two longitudinal grooves in front of the posterior margin. The side pieces of the labrum feature smooth margins with rounded inner corners next to the middle piece. The tergites feature two distinct grooves. The sternites feature a sharply defined furrow in the middle that is only indistinctly forked at the anterior end.

This species exhibits many traits that characterize the family Mecistocephalidae. For example, like other species in this family, this species features two longitudinal grooves on the tergites of the leg-bearing segments. This species shares a more extensive set of traits with other species of Mecistocephalus. For example, like other species in this genus, this species features not only a body that tapers toward the posterior end but also a longitudinal furrow in the middle of the sternites.

This species shares a more distinctive set of traits with two other species in the same genus, M. evansi and M. lifuensis. For example, like the species M. erythroceps, the species M. evansi and M . lifuensis each feature 51 leg pairs. Furthermore, in all three species, each lamella (comb blade) on the mandible features a row of teeth that extends all the way to the base, and the posterior margin of the labrum is completely devoid of bristles.

The species M. erythroceps, however, can be distinguished from both M. evansi and M. lifuensis based on the furrow on the sternites. In the species M. evansi and M. lifuensis, this furrow is distinctly forked. This bifurcation is faint in M. erythroceps, however, and thus more obscure than in either M. evansi or M. lifuensis
