= Mecistocephalus spissus =

Scientific classification
- Kingdom: Animalia
- Phylum: Arthropoda
- Subphylum: Myriapoda
- Class: Chilopoda
- Order: Geophilomorpha
- Family: Mecistocephalidae
- Genus: Mecistocephalus
- Species: M. spissus

Binomial name
- Mecistocephalus spissus Wood, 1862

Species of centipede

Mecistocephalus spissus is a species of soil centipede in the Mecistocephalidae family. This centipede is found in Hawaii. This species features only 45 pairs of legs, the minimum number recorded in the genus Mecistocephalus. This species was the first in this genus to be discovered with such a modest number of legs.

== Discovery and distribution ==
The American biologist Horatio Curtis Wood first described this species in 1862 based on type material found in Kauai or Oahu in Hawaii. The species is endemic to the Hawaiian Islands. This centipede is found on most of the major islands, mainly in mountainous areas. This species has been recorded on the islands of Hawaii, Kauai, Maui, Molokai, Necker, and Oahu.

== Phylogeny ==
A phylogenetic analysis of the family Mecistocephalidae based on morphology places this species in a clade with M. nannocornis, which was the second species in the genus Mecistocephalus to be discovered with only 45 leg-bearing segments. This analysis also places this clade on the most basal branch of a phylogenetic tree of this genus, with a sister group formed by all the other species in this genus. This study places these two species together in a clade on the most basal branch based on similar morphology even when the analysis excludes features related to the number of segments. This study also suggests that the common ancestor of the centipedes in this genus had 45 leg pairs and that the species in the sister group evolved through a process that added segments and increased the number of legs.

== Description ==
The species M. spissus is dark yellow-brown with no dark patches, features 45 leg-bearing segments, and can reach 70 mm in length. The head has a trapezoidal shape, and both the head and body taper toward the posterior end. The head is 1.7 to 1.8 times longer than wide. The dorsal surface of the head features a transverse frontal line that is curved and convex toward the rear. The clypeus features an areolate band down the middle that separates the smooth posterior area into two plagulae. The pleurites on the side of the head (buccae) feature setae on the posterior half only. The mandible features about eight lamellae (comb blades), with about seven teeth on the first lamella and 15 to 20 teeth on the intermediate lamellae. The coxosternite of the first maxillae is divided down the middle, but the coxosternite of the second maxillae is undivided. The forcipules are stout, and when closed, extend beyond the anterior margin of the head.

The sternites of the leg-bearing segments feature a longitudinal groove down the middle that is not forked at the anterior end. The sternite of the ultimate leg-bearing segment has the shape of a shield, but with a swollen process projecting from the posterior end. In adults, the basal element of each of the ultimate legs features about 40 pores on the ventral surface. The ultimate legs are slender with scattered setae and no sexual dimorphism. The telson features a pair of anal pores.

This species exhibits many traits that characterize the genus Mecistocephalus. For example, the head is evidently longer than wide and features a frontal line, the clypeus features an areolate strip down the middle dividing the two plagulae, the body tapers toward the posterior end, and the ultimate legs are slender without sexual dimorphism. Furthermore, the buccae feature setae and a spiculum on each side of the head, the trunk sternites feature a longitudinal groove, and the coxosternite of the first maxillae is divided, but the coxosternite of the second maxillae is undivided.

This species shares more distinctive traits with its close relative M. nannocornis. For example, both of these species feature only 45 leg pairs, buccae with setae on the posterior half only, a tooth on the third article of the forcipule, and a groove on the sternites of the leg-bearing segments that is not forked. Furthermore, the sternite of the last leg-bearing segment in each of these species lacks lateral notches but features a short posterior projection shaped like a pillow. Moreover, the first article of the forcipule in these species is relatively stout, with a length/width ratio in the range of only 1.3 to 1.6.

The species M. spissus can be distinguished from its close relative M. nannocornis, however, based on some clear differences in morphology. For example, the species M. spissus features a greater number of teeth on the forcipules, with two on the first article, one on the second, and two (one ventral and one dorsal) on the fourth. The species M. nannocornis has only one distal tooth on the first article, a tubercle on the second, and no distinct tooth on the fourth. Furthermore, the species M. spissus has a more elongated head, with a length/width ratio ranging from 1.7 to 1.8, whereas the species M. nannocornis has a relatively short head, with a length/width ratio of only about 1.5.
