= Mecistocephalus tahitiensis =

Scientific classification
- Kingdom: Animalia
- Phylum: Arthropoda
- Subphylum: Myriapoda
- Class: Chilopoda
- Order: Geophilomorpha
- Family: Mecistocephalidae
- Genus: Mecistocephalus
- Species: M. tahitiensis

Binomial name
- Mecistocephalus tahitiensis Wood, 1862

Synonyms
- Lamnonyx tahitiensis major Verhoeff, 1925

Species of centipede

Mecistocephalus tahitiensis is a species of centipede in the family Mecistocephalidae. This centipede is found in Australia and on islands in the Pacific. This species features only 47 pairs of legs rather than the 49 leg pairs usually observed in the genus Mecistocephalus.

== Discovery and taxonomy ==
This species was first described in 1862 by the American myriapodologist Horatio Wood. He based the original description of this centipede on type material found among the specimens in the collection of the Smithsonian Institution. The American biologist William Stimpson collected this material on the island of Tahiti in French Polynesia.

In 1887, the German zoologist Erich Haase described a variety of this species found on the island of Viti Levu in Fiji and named this subspecies M. tahitiensis porosus. In 1920, the American biologist Ralph V. Chamberlin deemed M. tahitiensis porosus to be a junior synonym of M. tahitiensis. Since then, other authorities have adopted the synonymy proposed by Chamberlin. Despite this proposed synonymy and the original description of this centipede as a subspecies, some references list M. porosus as a separate species.

In 1903, the Austrian myriapodologist Carl Attems placed the species M. tahitiensis in the genus Lamnonyx. In 1919, the Italian zoologist Filippo Silvestri followed suit, adopting the name Lamnonyx tahitiensis for this species, by then recorded in what is now Papua New Guinea as well as in Australia. In 1925, the German zoologist Karl W. Verhoeff described a subspecies under the name Lamnonyx tahitiensis major, also found in Australia. In 1929, however, Attems deemed Lamnonyx to be a junior synonym for Mecistocephalus, moving M. tahitiensis back to the genus in which it was originally placed. Authorities now deem the subspecies L. tahitiensis major to be a junior synonym for the parent species and Lamnonyx to be a junior synonym for Mecistocephalus.

== Phylogeny ==
A phylogenetic analysis of 46 species in the family Mecistocephalidae based on morphology places M. tahitiensis in a clade with two other Mecistocephalus species with only 47 pairs of legs, M. angusticeps and an undescribed species found on the Marquesas islands in French Polynesia. This analysis places a clade with only 45 leg pairs in the most basal branch of a phylogenetic tree of the genus Mecistocephalus, with a sister group formed by species in this genus with 47 or more leg pairs, and the clade with only 47 leg pairs in the second most basal branch, with a sister group formed by species in this genus with 49 or more leg pairs. This analysis indicates that the common ancestor of the species in this genus had 45 leg pairs, and that species with more leg pairs evolved through a process that added segments and increased the number of legs incrementally, first to 47 pairs, then (for most species in the genus) to 49 pairs.

== Description ==
This species has 47 pairs of legs and can reach 50 mm in length and 1.6 mm in width. The body is yellow with abundant dark pigment and a chestnut brown head. The head is nearly twice as long as wide. The anterior part of the clypeus is areolate and larger than the posterior part. The anterior part of the clypeus features six setae, with one pair posterior to the other two pairs. The pleurites on the side of the head (buccae) feature setae on the posterior half. Each of the second maxillae features a tiny claw at the tip.

This species exhibits many traits that characterize the genus Mecistocephalus. For example, like other species in this genus, M. tahitiensis features a head with a transverse frontal line on the dorsal surface, buccae with setae, a coxosternite of the first maxillae that is divided down the middle by a suture, and an undivided coxosternite of the second maxillae. Furthermore, like other species in this genus, M. tahitiensis features a head that is evidently longer than wide, second maxillae with claws, and a longitudinal groove down the middle of the sternites of the leg-bearing segments.

This species shares more distinctive features with its close relative M. angusticeps. For example, the species M. tahitiensis and M. angusticeps each feature only 47 leg pairs rather than the 49 pairs usually observed in the genus Mecistocephalus. Furthermore, in each of these species, the buccae feature setae on the posterior half only, the clypeus features a pair of setae in the middle of the clypeus posterior to all the other clypeal setae, and the groove on the trunk sternites is not forked at the anterior end.

The species M. tahitiensis can be distinguished from its close relative M. angusticeps, however, based on other traits. For example, the anterior part of the clypeus in M. angusticeps is areolate, but with finer or reduced reticulation in a conspicuous rounded area in the middle of the areolate part. In the species M. tahitiensis, however, the entire anterior part of the clypeus is evidently and evenly reticulated. Furthermore, the areolate area in the middle of the coxosternite of the second maxillae in M. tahitiensis features smooth areas surrounded by areolation, but these smooth islands are absent in M. angusticeps. Moreover, the lateral parts of the clypeus in M. tahitiensis feature groups of sensilla shaped like buttons, but these lateral groups are absent in M. angusticeps.

== Distribution ==
This species is found in Australia, New Guinea, Samoa, and the Marquesas islands as well as Tahiti. Including M. tahitiensis porosus as a subspecies or a junior synonym, the species M. tahitiensis is also found in Fiji. This centipede is common in Australia, where this species has been recorded in Western Australia, New South Wales, and Queensland. On the island of New Guinea, this species has been recorded at Sattelberg in Papua New Guinea. In Samoa, this species has been recorded on the island of Upolu. This centipede is also common throughout the Marquesas, where this species has been recorded on the islands of Eiao, Hatutu, Hiva Oa, Nuku Hiva, Ua Huka, and Ua Pou.
