= Mecistocephalus glabridorsalis =

Scientific classification
- Kingdom: Animalia
- Phylum: Arthropoda
- Subphylum: Myriapoda
- Class: Chilopoda
- Order: Geophilomorpha
- Family: Mecistocephalidae
- Genus: Mecistocephalus
- Species: M. glabridorsalis

Binomial name
- Mecistocephalus glabridorsalis Attems, 1900

Synonyms
- Mecistocephalus vanmoli Demange, 1981

Species of centipede

Mecistocephalus glabridorsalis is a species of soil centipede in the Mecistocephalidae family. This centipede is found in Seychelles. This species features 49 pairs of legs and can reach 85 mm in length.

== Discovery ==
This centipede was first described in 1900 by the Austrian myriapodologist Carl Attems. He based the original description of this centipede on two specimens, an adult male and a juvenile. These specimens were found on the island of Mahé in Seychelles.

== Taxonomy ==
Attems originally described this centipede as a subspecies of Mecistocephalus punctifrons. In 1902, the Swiss zoologists Henri de Saussure and Leo Zehntner elevated M. glabridorsalis to the rank of species. Some other authors, however, continued to deem this centipede a subspecies or a junior synonym of M. punctifrons. Authorities now regard M. glabridorsalis as an accepted species.

In 1981, the French myriapodologist Jean-Marie Demange described M. vanmoli as a new species based on specimens found on the island of Mahé in Seychelles. In 2010, the Italian biologists Lucio Bonato and Alessandro Minelli deemed M. vanmoli to be a junior synonym of M. glabridorsalis. Consequently, some references regard M. vanmoli as a junior synonym, but other references list M. vanmoli as an accepted species.

== Description ==
The species M. glabridorsalis features 49 leg-bearing segments and can reach 85 mm in length. The body is mostly yellow with some dark pigment on the dorsal surface of the trunk, but the head and anterior segments are reddish brown. The head is about 1.6 to 1.9 times longer than wide. The dorsal surface of the head features a transverse frontal line that is uniformly curved. Each antenna is about four or five times longer than the head is wide. The areolate area on the anterior part of the clypeus is about as long as the smooth areas on the posterior part of the clypeus (plagulae). This areolate area features about four pairs of setae arranged in a transverse row, but with the middle pair usually posterior to the others. The pleurites on the sides of the head (buccae) feature setae only on the posterior half. Each mandible can feature up to 16 or 17 pectinate lamellae (comb blades). The anterior corners of the coxosternite of the first maxillae are pointed and project forwards. The claw on each of the second maxillae narrows abruptly into a tip that is usually rounded.

The first article of the forcipule features a small proximal tubercle and a large but obtuse distal tooth that points out from a wide base rather than forwards. The second and third articles of the forcipule each feature a small tubercle, with the tubercle on the third article larger than the one on the second. The base of the ultimate article of the forcipule features a small tubercle. The sterna of the leg-bearing segments feature a longitudinal groove in the middle that divides into branches that form an acute or right angle with one another. The sternum of the last leg-bearing segment is shaped like a trapezoid that is wider than long and features a notch on each lateral margin.

This species exhibits many traits that characterize the genus Mecistocephalus. For example, like other species in this genus, M. glabridorsalis features a head with a transverse frontal line, a coxosternite of the first maxillae that is divided down the middle by a suture, and an undivided coxosternite of the second maxillae. Furthermore, like other species in this genus, M. glabridorsalis features a head that is evidently longer than wide, buccae with setae, second maxillae with claws, and a longitudinal groove on the trunk sternites.

This species shares a more extensive set of traits with another species in the same genus, M. punctifrons, with which M. glabridorsalis has often been confused. For example, each of these species features 49 leg pairs, a frontal line on the head that is uniformly curved, and a forked longitudinal groove on the trunk sternites. Furthermore, in both species, the anterior corners of the coxosternite of the first maxillae are pointed and project forwards.

The species M. glabridorsalis can be distinguished from M. punctifrons, however, based on other traits. For example, the forcipule in M. punctifrons features two developed teeth on the first article, with the proximal tooth only slightly smaller than the distal tooth, developed teeth on the second and third articles, and two small basal teeth on the ultimate article, whereas the forcipule in M. glabridorsalis features only a small proximal tubercle and a distal tooth on the first article and only one small tubercle on each of the other articles. Furthermore, the anterior half of the buccae features setae in M. punctifrons but not in M. glabridorsalis. Moreover, the sternite of the last leg-bearing segment features a posterior projection shaped like a pillow in M. punctifrons but features lateral notches instead in M. glabridorsalis.

== Distribution and ecology ==
The species M. glabridorsalis has been recorded not only in Seychelles but also on the island of New Guinea, on the island of Seram in the Maluku Islands in Indonesia, and in the Bismark Archipelago in Papua New Guinea. In Seychelles, this species has been found not only on the island of Mahé but also on the islands of La Digue, Praslin, and Silhouette. Authorities express doubts about reports of this species from localities outside Seychelles and suggest that these records require confirmation. This centipede has been found primarily in woodland soil at elevations between 20 meters and 1,500 meters.
