= Mecistocephalus furculigera =

Scientific classification
- Kingdom: Animalia
- Phylum: Arthropoda
- Subphylum: Myriapoda
- Class: Chilopoda
- Order: Geophilomorpha
- Family: Mecistocephalidae
- Genus: Mecistocephalus
- Species: M. furculigera

Binomial name
- Mecistocephalus furculigera (Verhoeff, 1925)

Synonyms
- Lamnonyx punctifrons furculigera Verhoeff, 1925

Species of centipede

Mecistocephalus furculigera is a species of soil centipede in the family Mecistocephalidae. This centipede is endemic to Australia. This species features 49 pairs of legs and can reach 36 mm in length.

== Discovery and distribution ==
This species was first described in 1925 by the German myriapodologist Karl Wilhelm Verhoeff. Verhoeff based the original description of this centipede on a single specimen found in the town of Cooktown in Queensland in Australia. This species is known only from coastal northeastern Queensland. Although Verhoeff reported finding another specimen from Palestine, authorities consider this record to be based on misidentification.

== Taxonomy ==
Verhoeff originally described this centipede as a subspecies under the name Lamnonyx punctifrons furculigera. In 1929, the Austrian myriapodologist Carl Attems placed this subspecies in the genus Mecistocephalus instead. Authorities now deem Lamnonyx to be a junior synonym and consider Mecistocephalus the valid name for Lamnonyx. References now list M. furculigera as an accepted species, but some continue to list this centipede as a subspecies.

== Description ==
This species features 49 leg pairs and can reach 36 mm in length. The body is light yellow, but the head is brown. The anterior and middle parts of the clypeus are reticulated, but this areolate area may include a small smoother oval area in the center with finer reticulation. The posterior part of the clypeus lacks pores. The outer corners of the coxosternite of the first maxillae are rounded and protrude only slightly. The sternites of the anterior segments feature a groove that is forked at the anterior end. The basal element of each of the ultimate legs features numerous pores scattered over most of the surface.

== Ecology ==
This centipede is a solitary terrestrial predator that inhabits plant litter and soil.
