= Mecistocephalus marcusensis =

Scientific classification
- Kingdom: Animalia
- Phylum: Arthropoda
- Subphylum: Myriapoda
- Class: Chilopoda
- Order: Geophilomorpha
- Family: Mecistocephalidae
- Genus: Mecistocephalus
- Species: M. marcusensis

Binomial name
- Mecistocephalus marcusensis Miyoshi, 1953

Species of centipede

Mecistocephalus marcusensis is a species of soil centipede in the family Mecistocephalidae. This centipede is found on Minamitorishima, also known as Marcus Island, a small and isolated Japanese atoll in the northwestern Pacific Ocean. This species features 49 pairs of legs and can reach about 26 mm in length.

== Discovery and distribution ==
This species was first described in 1953 by Japanese myriapodologist Yasunori Miyoshi. He based the original description of this species on type material found on the island of Minamitorishima. This species is known only from this island.

== Description ==
This species features 49 leg pairs and can reach about 26 mm in length. The body is yellow, but the head is orange. The dorsal plate on the head is almost twice as long as wide and features two short grooves on the posterior part. The clypeus features a transverse row of about six bristles. The middle of the labrum is shaped like a wedge. The mandibles feature about six lamellae, with four teeth on the first lamella and 10 to 20 teeth on a middle lamella. The first pair of legs are less than half as long as the second pair. The ridge on the sternites is forked at the anterior end, with the two branches forming an obtuse angle. The basal element of each of the ultimate legs features 18 small pores.
