= Mecistocephalus japonicus =

Scientific classification
- Kingdom: Animalia
- Phylum: Arthropoda
- Subphylum: Myriapoda
- Class: Chilopoda
- Order: Geophilomorpha
- Family: Mecistocephalidae
- Genus: Mecistocephalus
- Species: M. japonicus

Binomial name
- Mecistocephalus japonicus Meinert, 1886

Synonyms
- Mecistocephalus mirandus Pocock, 1895; Mecistocephalus fenestratus Verhoeff, 1934

Species of centipede

Mecistocephalus japonicus is a species of soil centipede in the family Mecistocephalidae. This centipede is notable for featuring 63 or 65 pairs of legs rather than the 49 leg pairs usually observed in the genus Mecistocephalus. This centipede is one of only a few species in the genus Mecistocephalus or in the family Mecistocephalidae with more than 55 leg pairs. This centipede is also one of only a few species in this family to exhibit any variation in leg number among specimens. This species is found from the island of Honshu in Japan to Taiwan.

== Discovery and taxonomy ==
This species was first described in 1886 by the Danish zoologist Frederik V.A. Meinert. He based the original description of this species on a female holotype with 63 pairs of legs found on the island of Kyushu in Japan. The type material is deposited in the Zoological Museum of University of Copenhagen in Denmark.

In 1895, the British zoologist Reginald I. Pocock described M. mirandus as a new species with 65 pairs of legs. He based the original description of this species on two specimens (one male and one female). These syntypes were found in Okinawa in the Ryukyu Islands of Japan and are deposited in the Natural History Museum in London.

In 1934, the German zoologist Karl W. Verhoeff described M. fenestratus as a new species with 63 pairs of legs. He based the original description of this species on a single male specimen. This specimen was found near Tokyo on the island of Honshu in Japan.

Until 2007, authorities considered M. japonicus, M. mirandus, and M. fenestratus to be three separate species, distinguishing M. mirandus from M. japonicus based on leg number and the presumed absence of variation in leg number within species in the family Mecistocephalidae. The discovery in 2001 of variation in leg number in the species M. microporus, however, prompted a reconsideration of the diagnostic value of leg number in this family. The Italian biologists Marco Uliana, Lucio Bonato, and Alessandro Minelli examined four adult specimens (two males and two females) with 65 leg pairs, including the M. mirandus syntypes, and twelve specimens with 63 leg pairs, including both sexes. After a review of the literature, Uliana, Bonato, and Minelli found no consistent difference between M. fenestratus and M. japonicus and no basis for distinguishing M. mirandus from M. japonicus other than leg number. Noting the overlapping geographic distributions of these species, Uliana, Bonato, and Minelli concluded in 2007 that both M. fenestratus and M. mirandus are junior synonyms of M. japonicus. Authorities now deem these two names to be synonyms for M. japonicus, but some references continue to list M. fenestratus and M. mirnadus as valid species.

== Distribution ==
This species has been found in not only on the islands of Honshu, Shikoku, and Kyushu, and the Ryukyu Islands in Japan but also in Taiwan. Specimens with 63 leg pairs have been recorded throughout this range. Specimens with 65 leg pairs have been recorded from Shikoku, the Ryukyu Islands, and Taiwan.

== Phylogeny ==
A phylogenetic analysis of the family Mecistocephalidae based on morphology places the species M. japonicus in a clade with the species M. diversisternus. Similarly, a phylogenetic analysis of ten Mecistocephalus species based on molecular data identifies M. diversisternus as the closest relative of M. japonicus in a phylogenetic tree. The species M. diversisternus features 57 or 59 pairs of legs and is also found from Honshu to Taiwan, including Shikoku, Kyushu, and the Ryukyu Islands.

== Description ==
This species can have either 63 or 65 pairs of legs in each sex. The adults range from about 7 cm to 17 cm in length. The body is yellow without dark patches, but the forcipular segment and the head are darker. The head is 1.8 to 2.2 times longer than wide, and the antennae are 3.8 to 5.0 times as long as the head is wide. The pleurites on the sides of the head feature spicula but lack setae. The clypeus is 1.9 to 2.2 times wider than long and features 20 to 30 setae scattered on each side. Each of the second maxillae features an apical claw. The exposed part of the forcipular sternum is 1.3 to 1.5 times wider than long. The first article of the forcipules each feature two teeth, the second and third articles each feature a single tubercle, and the ultimate article is almost smooth or features two tubercles, one dorsal relative to the other. The sternites feature a furrow without bifurcation. The ventral sides of the ultimate legs feature dense short setae in males and often some short setae in females, but these legs lack an apical spine.

This species exhibits many traits shared with other Mecistocephalus species. For example, like other centipedes in the same genus, this species features an elongated head with spicula and second maxillae ending in claws. Furthermore, the first article of the forcipule features two teeth.

This species shares an especially extensive set of traits with its closest relative, M. diversisternus. For example, both species feature trunks without dark patches and cephalic pleurites without setae. Furthermore, both species feature a furrow on their sternites that is not forked. These close relatives, however, can be distinguished based on other traits. For example, M. diversisternus not only features fewer legs (57 or 59 pairs) than M. japonicus but also is much smaller, with adults that range from 2.5 cm to 5.5 cm in length. Furthermore, the side of the clypeus in M. japonicus features 20 to 30 setae where M. diversisternus features only three or four. Moreover, the clypeus in M. japonicus is wider relative to its length than in M. diversisternus, which has a width/length ratio that ranges from 1.6 to 1.9.
