= Mecistocephalus porosus =

Scientific classification
- Kingdom: Animalia
- Phylum: Arthropoda
- Subphylum: Myriapoda
- Class: Chilopoda
- Order: Geophilomorpha
- Family: Mecistocephalidae
- Genus: Mecistocephalus
- Species: M. porosus

Binomial name
- Mecistocephalus porosus Haase, 1887

Synonyms
- Mecistocephalus tahitiensis porosus Haase, 1887

Species of centipede

Mecistocephalus porosus is a species of soil centipede in the Mecistocephalidae family. This species is found in Fiji. This centipede can reach 41 mm in length.

== Discovery and distribution ==
This centipede was first described in 1887 by German entomologist Erich Haase. He based the original description of this centipede on a holotype found on the island of Viti Levu in Fiji. This species is known only from Fiji.

== Taxonomy ==
Haase originally described this centipede as a subspecies of M. tahitiensis. In 1920, the American biologist Ralph V. Chamberlin deemed M. tahitiensis porosus to be a junior synonym of M. tahitiensis. Since then, other authorities have adopted the synonymy proposed by Chamberlin. Despite this proposed synonymy and the original description of this centipede as a subspecies, many references list M. porosus as a separate species.

== Description ==
This centipede can reach 41 mm in length and reaches a maximum width of 2 mm in the middle of its body. The anterior segments are 1.8 mm wide, and the posterior segments are only 0.8 mm wide. This centipede features white spots on the tergites.
