= Mecistocephalus okabei =

Scientific classification
- Kingdom: Animalia
- Phylum: Arthropoda
- Subphylum: Myriapoda
- Class: Chilopoda
- Order: Geophilomorpha
- Family: Mecistocephalidae
- Genus: Mecistocephalus
- Species: M. okabei

Binomial name
- Mecistocephalus okabei Takakuwa, 1942

Species of centipede

Mecistocephalus okabei is a species of centipede in the Mecistocephalidae family. It was described in 1942 by Japanese myriapodologist Yosioki Takakuwa.

== Distribution ==
The species occurs in Micronesia. The type locality is Babeldaob, Palau.
