= Mecistocephalus microporus =

Scientific classification
- Kingdom: Animalia
- Phylum: Arthropoda
- Subphylum: Myriapoda
- Class: Chilopoda
- Order: Geophilomorpha
- Family: Mecistocephalidae
- Genus: Mecistocephalus
- Species: M. microporus

Binomial name
- Mecistocephalus microporus Haase, 1887

Synonyms
- Megethmus pluripes Chamberlin, 1920

Species of centipede

Mecistocephalus microporus is a species of soil centipede in the family Mecistocephalidae. This centipede can feature 101 pairs of legs, far more than any other species in this family. The other species in this family feature no more than 65 leg pairs, and most feature only 49 leg pairs. Furthermore, the number of leg pairs varies in M. microporus, with odd numbers ranging from 93 to 101. This centipede is one of only a few species in this family to exhibit any variation in leg number and was the first species in this family found to do so. This species is also notable for its large size, reaching 125 mm in length, and is found in the Philippines.

== Discovery and taxonomy ==
This species was first described in 1887 by the German zoologist Erich Haase. He based the original description of this species on a female holotype measuring 125 mm in length and featuring 101 leg pairs. This holotype was found on the island of Luzon in the Philippines and is deposited in the Museum für Naturkunde in Berlin. Haase originally described this species under the name Mecistocephalus microporus. In 1896, the American biologist Orator F. Cook proposed the genus Megethmus to contain this species, citing the distinctive morphology of this centipede, including its many legs. Cook designated M. microporus as the type species of this new genus.

In 1920, the American biologist Ralph V. Chamberlin described Megethmus pluripes as a new species in the same genus. He based the original description of this species on a male holotype and two paratypes. All three type specimens were found by the American zoologist Charles F. Baker on the island of Luzon in the Philippines. Chamberlin described this species as a centipede with 97 leg pairs, based on the holotype and a juvenile paratype, each with 97 leg pairs; the other paratype is a fragment with only the last 81 leg-bearing segments of a male specimen. Chamberlin cited leg number as one of the traits distinguishing M. pluripes from M. microporus, based on the assumption that leg number is constant in all species in the family Mecistocephalidae. The M. pluripes type specimens are deposited in the Museum of Comparative Zoology of Harvard University.

In 2001, the Italian biologists Lucio Bonato, Donatella Foddai, and Alessandro Minelli redescribed the species M. microporus and deemed M. pluripes to be a junior synonym of M. microporus. They based this redescription on an examination of six specimens, including not only the type specimens of both M. microporus and M. pluripes but also two specimens collected together in 1980 at an elevation of 700 meters on the island of Cebu in the Philippines. One of these two specimens is a female with 93 leg pairs; the other is a male with 95 leg pairs. Bonato, Foddai, and Minelli found that none of the supposed differences in morphology cited by Chamberlin hold up to scrutiny. They concluded that M. microporus exhibits instraspecific variation in leg number, contrary to the longstanding assumption that this number is constant in all mecistocephalid species.

Furthermore, Bonato, Foddai, and Minelli also deemed Megethmus to be a junior synonym of Mecistocephalus, thereby returning M. microporus to its original genus, citing a cladistic analysis of the family Mecistocephalidae based on morphology. This analysis finds Megethmus nested among species of Mecistocephalus in a phylogenetic tree of this family. Bonato, Foddai, and Minelli deemed Megethmus to be a junior synonym to avoid the paraphyly of the genus Mecistocephalus.

== Phylogeny ==
A cladistic analysis of the family Mecistocephiladae based on morphology places M. microporus in a clade with another species of Mecistocephalus, M. multidentatus, a species with only 49 leg pairs that emerges as the closest relative in this analysis. These two close relatives are nested among other species of Mecistocephalus with 49 leg pairs, indicating a common ancestor with 49 leg pairs. The evidence suggests that the species M. microporus evolved from an immediate ancestor through a process that drastically increased the number of leg-bearing segments to roughly double the original 49 segments.

== Description ==
Adults of the species M. microporus can range from 52 mm to 125 mm in length. The number of leg-bearing segments in this species can vary, with odd numbers ranging from 93 to 101. The body tapers toward the posterior end and is orange-brown without dark patches, whereas the head and forcipular segment are chestnut.

The dorsal plate on the head is shaped like a rectangle about twice as long as wide, with a straight posterior margin and a rounded frontal suture. Each antenna is 2.8 times as long as the head. The clypeus is mostly areolate and features a longitudinal areolate strip down the middle between two smooth areas (plagulae) on the posterior part. The plagulae cover more than one-third but less than one-half of the clypeus. Several micropores pierce the anterior part of each plagula. The pleurites on the sides of the head (buccae) feature setae on the posterior half only. The spicula on the buccae point forward. The mandible features nine or ten pectinate lamellae (comb blades), with six teeth on the first lamella and about 15 teeth on an intermediate lamella. The coxosternite of the first maxillae is divided in the middle longitudinally and features well developed anterior corners that point forward. The coxosternite of the second maxillae is not divided, and each of the second maxillae ends in a rudimentary claw.

The forcipular tergum features a deep longitudinal groove down the middle. The first article of the forcipule features two rounded teeth on the internal margin, with the distal tooth larger than the proximal tooth. The second and third articles each feature a rounded tooth, with the tooth on the third article larger than that on the second article. The ultimate article features a shallow rounded base and a smooth internal margin. The poison calyx in the forcipule extends from the base of the ultimate article to the distal part of the first article.

The longitudinal groove on the sternites is forked, with branches forming a wide obtuse angle. The sternite of the last leg-bearing segment is shaped like a trapezoid that is 1.4 times as wide as long. The basal elements of the ultimate legs are swollen and extend as far as forward as the spiracles of the preceding segment. These elements also feature numerous small pores of uniform size, with about 200 on the ventral surface and others on most of the dorsal surface. Each of the ultimate legs is slender, features six articles, and ends in a slender short spine. The telson features a pair of anal pores.

This species exhibits many traits that characterize the genus Mecistocephalus. For example, like other species in this genus, this species features a head that is evidently longer than wide, a transverse frontal line on the dorsal surface of the head, an areolate strip down the middle of the clypeus, setae and spicula on the buccae, a longitudinal suture dividing the coxosternite of the first maxillae, an undivided coxosternite of the second maxillae, claws on the second maxillae, a groove in the middle of the forcipular tergum, a body that evidently tapers backwards, and a groove on the sternites of the trunk segments. Furthermore, like other species in this genus, this species also features ultimate legs that are as slender in the male as in the female.

This species shares more distinctive traits with its close relative M. multidentatus, which is found in Taiwan. For example, each of these species features a trunk without dark patches, a head about twice as long as wide, buccae with setae on the posterior half only, a mandible with about nine lamellae, and a forked groove on the sternites. Furthermore, in each of these species, the anterior corners of the coxosternite of the first maxillae are pointed, the basal element of the ultimate legs features pores on the dorsal surface, and the forcipule features two teeth on the first article (one proximal and one distal), a tooth on the third article, and a poison calyx that reaches the distal part of the first article.

The species M. microporus and M. multidentatus can be distinguished, however, based on not only the stark difference in leg number but also other traits. For example, the plagulae feature micropores in M. microporus but not in M. multidentatus. Furthermore, the mandible features fewer teeth in M. microporus (six on the first lamella and about 15 on an intermediate lamella) than in M. multidentatus (ten on the first lamella and 30 to 40 on an intermediate lamella). Moreover, the areolate part of the clypeus is longer than the plagulae in M. microporus but shorter than the plagulae in M. multidentatus, and the branches of the forked groove on the sternites form a wide obtuse angle in M. microporus but a right angle in M. multidentatus.
