= Mecistocephalus capillatus =

Scientific classification
- Kingdom: Animalia
- Phylum: Arthropoda
- Subphylum: Myriapoda
- Class: Chilopoda
- Order: Geophilomorpha
- Family: Mecistocephalidae
- Genus: Mecistocephalus
- Species: M. capillatus

Binomial name
- Mecistocephalus capillatus Takakuwa, 1935

Species of centipede

Mecistocephalus capillatus is a species of centipede in the Mecistocephalidae family. It was described in 1935 by Japanese myriapodologist Yosioki Takakuwa.

== Description ==
This species features 47 pairs of legs. The ridges on the sternites are not forked at the anterior end. The telopodites of the second maxillae extend far beyond the first maxillae. The gonopods in females each have two articles and are in contact with one another. The tergites feature several pits covered with bristles.

== Distribution ==
The species occurs in Micronesia. The type locality is Jaluit, Marshall Islands.
