= Mecistocephalus collinus =

Scientific classification
- Kingdom: Animalia
- Phylum: Arthropoda
- Subphylum: Myriapoda
- Class: Chilopoda
- Order: Geophilomorpha
- Family: Mecistocephalidae
- Genus: Mecistocephalus
- Species: M. collinus

Binomial name
- Mecistocephalus collinus Verhoeff, 1937

Species of centipede

Mecistocephalus collinus is a species of centipede in the Mecistocephalidae family. It is endemic to Australia, and was first described in 1937 by German myriapodologist Karl Wilhelm Verhoeff.

== Description ==
This species features 47 pairs of legs. The anterior part of the clypeus features three pairs of bristles, but no bristles appear on the posterior part. The ridge on the sternites is not forked at the anterior end. The telopodites of the second maxillae extend far beyond the first maxillae.

== Distribution ==
The species occurs in south-west Western Australia. The type locality is Gooseberry Hill, Perth.

== Behaviour ==
The centipedes are solitary terrestrial predators that inhabit plant litter and soil.
