= Mecistocephalus =

Scientific classification
- Kingdom: Animalia
- Phylum: Arthropoda
- Subphylum: Myriapoda
- Class: Chilopoda
- Order: Geophilomorpha
- Family: Mecistocephalidae
- Genus: Mecistocephalus; Newport, 1843

Type species
- Mecistocephalus punctifrons Newport, 1843

Genus of centipedes

Mecistocephalus is the largest genus of centipedes in the family Mecistocephalidae, with about 140 species. This genus is among the most diverse and widespread of all the genera in the order Geophilomorpha. The British entomologist George Newport first proposed this genus in 1843 to contain a group of centipedes marked by an unusual elongation of the head.

== Description ==
Centipedes in this genus range from 2 cm to 10 cm in length. The head, forcipular segment, and their appendages are often elongated, with a head that is obviously longer than wide. A pair of sclerotized teeth (spicula) point forward from the anterior end of the pleurites on the sides of the head (buccae). The buccae also feature setae on at least the posterior half. The smooth areas at the posterior end of the clypeus (plagulae) are separated by an areolate stripe down the middle of the clypeus.

The coxosternite of the first maxillae is divided down the middle by a longitudinal suture, but the coxosternite of the second maxillae is undivided. The second maxillae reach beyond the first maxillae and are well developed with a simple claw. The forcipular tergum is slightly wider than long and features a distinct longitudinal furrow in the middle. Each of the first articles of the forcipules often features a pair of denticles, one distal and the other near the middle of the article. The body tapers distinctly toward the posterior. The first pair of legs are markedly reduced in size. The ultimate legs are slender and do not exhibit sexual dimorphism.

Centipedes in the genus Mecistocephalus usually have 45 to 51 pairs of legs, but some have more, up to as many as 101 leg pairs. Most species in this genus have 49 pairs of legs (e.g., M. modestus and M. subgigas), but other species have 51 pairs (e.g., M. evansi and M. lifuensis), 47 pairs (e.g., M. angusticeps and M. tahitiensis), or 45 pairs (e.g., M. nannocornis and M. spissus). Intraspecific variation in the number of leg-bearing segments within each sex has been recorded among the species with the greatest number of legs in this genus: M. diversisternus, which has 57 or 59 leg pairs, M. japonicus, which has 63 or 65 leg pairs, and M. microporus, which has odd numbers of leg pairs ranging from 93 to 101, the maximum number recorded in the family Mecistocephalidae.

== Phylogeny ==
A phylogenetic analysis of the family Mecistocephalidae using morphological features places the genus Mecistocephalus in the subfamily Mecistocephalinae along with the genera Tygarrup, Krateraspis, and Takashimaia. The genera in this subfamily share a set of distinctive traits. For example, these diagnostic features include a body that tapers toward the posterior end, a cephalic plate that is evidently longer than wide, a divided coxosternum of the first maxillae, an undivided coxosternum of the second maxillae, well developed second maxillae that each feature a reduced claw, and a forcipular tergum that is slightly wider than long.

Phylogenetic analysis based on morphology also places the genus Tygarrup on the most basal branch of a phylogenetic tree in the subfamily Mecistocephalinae, with the genus Krateraspis on the second most basal branch and the genus Takashimaia on the third most basal branch. This analysis leaves the species of Mecistocephalus in a clade forming a sister group for Takashimaia. Thus, Takashimaia emerges as the genus most closely related to Mecistocephalus.

The genera Mecistocephalus and Takashimaia share a distinctive set of traits. For example, unlike the other genera in the same subfamily, both Mecistocephalus and Takashimaia feature a spiculum on each side of the head. Furthermore, in both genera, the forcipular tergum features a distinct longitudinal groove down the middle.

These two closely related genera can be distinguished, however, based on other traits. For example, the clypeus is areolate in the center and features an areolate longitudinal stripe down the middle of the posterior part in Mecistocephalus but not in Takashimaia. Furthermore, the buccae feature setae in Mecistocephalus but not in Takashimaia. Moreover, the inner margins of the anterior sclerites of the side pieces of the labrum are reduced to points in Takashimaia but not in Mecistocephalus.

Phylogenetic analysis based on morphology also indicates that the common ancestor of the subfamily Mecistocephalinae had 45 leg pairs, with species featuring more leg pairs evolving through a process that added leg pairs incrementally. For example, this analysis indicates that the common ancestor of the genus Mecistocephalus also had 45 leg pairs and places extant species with 45 leg pairs in a clade on the most basal branch of a phylogenetic tree in this genus. These species form a sister group for a clade containing all other Mecistocephalus species, which share a common ancestor with 47 leg pairs. The second most basal branch in this genus contains a clade with 47 leg pairs, which forms a sister group for a clade containing the remaining Mecistocephalus species, which share a common ancestor with 49 leg pairs. Thus, Mecistocephalus species with more than 49 leg pairs evolved from a common ancestor with 49 leg pairs, which in turn evolved from an ancestor with 47 leg pairs, which in turn evolved from an ancestor with 45 leg pairs.

== Distribution ==
This genus is distributed over a large geographic range. Centipedes in this genus are found mainly in tropical and subtropical regions of south and east Asia, with some also found in temperate areas and in the Americas. Maximum diversity in terms of species occurs in the region of Japan and southeast Asia.

== Species ==
There are about 140 valid species, including the following:

- Mecistocephalus angusticeps (Ribaut,1914)
- Mecistocephalus apator Chamberlin, 1920
- Mecistocephalus brevisternalis Takakuwa, 1934
- Mecistocephalus capillatus Takakuwa, 1935
- Mecistocephalus castaneiceps Haase, 1887
- Mecistocephalus ciliatus Takakuwa, 1942
- Mecistocephalus collinus Verhoeff, 1937
- Mecistocephalus consocius Chamberlin, 1944
- Mecistocephalus diversisternus (Silvestri, 1919)
- Mecistocephalus erythroceps Chamberlin, 1920
- Mecistocephalus evansi Brölemann, 1922
- Mecistocephalus furculigera (Verhoeff, 1925)
- Mecistocephalus gigas Haase, 1887
- Mecistocephalus glabridorsalis Attems, 1900
- Mecistocephalus gracilis (Verhoeff, 1925)
- Mecistocephalus hebrides (Chamberlin,1944)
- Mecistocephalus heteropus Humbert, 1865
- Mecistocephalus japonicus Meinert, 1886
- Mecistocephalus kabasanus (Chamberlin, 1920)
- Mecistocephalus kurandanus Chamberlin, 1920
- Mecistocephalus labasanus (Chamberlin, 1920)
- Mecistocephalus lifuensis Pocock, 1899
- Mecistocephalus magister Chamberlin, 1939
- Mecistocephalus manokwarius Chamberlin, 1944
- Mecistocephalus marcusensis Miyosi, 1953
- Mecistocephalus mater (Verhoeff, 1925)
- Mecistocephalus microporus Haase, 1887
- Mecistocephalus modestus (Silvestri,1919)
- Mecistocephalus nagasaunus Chamberlin, 1920
- Mecistocephalus nannocornis Chamberlin, 1920
- Mecistocephalus nigriceps Chamberlin, 1920
- Mecistocephalus ocanus Chamberlin, 1946
- Mecistocephalus okabei Takakuwa, 1942
- Mecistocephalus ongi Takakuwa, 1934
- Mecistocephalus porosus Haase, 1887
- Mecistocephalus pseustes (Chamberlin,1939)
- Mecistocephalus punctifrons Newport, 1843
- Mecistocephalus siaronus (Chamberlin, 1920)
- Mecistocephalus simplex Chamberlin, 1920
- Mecistocephalus smithii Pocock, 1895
- Mecistocephalus somonus (Chamberlin, 1920)
- Mecistocephalus spissus Wood, 1862
- Mecistocephalus subgigas (Silvestri,1919)
- Mecistocephalus subinsularis (Silvestri, 1919)
- Mecistocephalus tahitiensis Wood, 1862
- Mecistocephalus tsenapus Chamberlin, 1944
- Mecistocephalus turucanus (Chamberlin, 1920)
- Mecistocephalus uncifer (Silvestri,1919)
- Mecistocephalus waikaneus Chamberlin, 1953
- Mecistocephalus waipaheenas (Chamberlin, 1953)
- Mecistocephalus zygethus Chamberlin, 1939
