= Mecistocephalus evansi =

Scientific classification
- Kingdom: Animalia
- Phylum: Arthropoda
- Subphylum: Myriapoda
- Class: Chilopoda
- Order: Geophilomorpha
- Family: Mecistocephalidae
- Genus: Mecistocephalus
- Species: M. evansi

Binomial name
- Mecistocephalus evansi Brolemann, 1922

Species of centipede

Mecistocephalus evansi is a species of soil centipede in the family Mecistocephalidae. This centipede is found in Iraq, Israel, and Iran. This species is notable for featuring 51 pairs of legs rather than the 49 leg pairs usually observed in the genus Mecistocephalus.

== Discovery, distribution, and habitats ==
This species was first described by the French myriapodologist Henry W. Brolemann in 1922. He based the original description of this species on a single female specimen found in the Maysan governorate (formerly Amara province) on the Tigris river in Iraq. Since the discovery of the first specimen, this species has been found in other locations in Iraq, Iran, and Israel. Several specimens have been recorded in Israel, mostly from Mediterranean regions of the Galilee, at higher elevations with lower temperatures and more precipitation. The Israeli specimens include those found in Mount Meron and Gush Halav as well as one found in Be’er Sheva in the Negev desert that may be the result of an anthropogenic transfer. This species has also been found in Gakal Cave in the Kohgiluyeh and Boyer-Ahmad province of Iran, indicating that M. evansi is a troglophile, living in subterranean habitats as well as at the surface. Furthermore, specimens have been found in the Basrah governorate in Iraq, including specimens from the Al-Hartha and Shatt Al-Arab districts. Specimens collected from the Basrah governorate include five males and six females found in 2022 on wet agricultural land, in the soil under palm trees, on the left bank of the Shatt Al-Arab river and in the Al-Hartha district.

== Description ==
This species has 51 pairs of legs and can reach 38 mm in length. The head is shaped like a rectangle, with nearly the same width in the back as in the front, and features a pair of longitudinal grooves on the surface in front of a straight posterior margin. The mandible features eight pectinate lamellae (comb blades), with six or seven teeth on the first lamella and fourteen teeth on the middle lamellae. The dorsal cephalic plate nearly covers the forcipules. The forcipular sternite has an anterior margin that is almost straight in the middle and features no teeth. This sternite also has no chitin-lines and is more than 1.2 times longer than wide. The first article of the forcipule has a distinct intermediate denticle as well as a distal denticle. The ultimate article of the forcipule lacks a distinct basal denticle.

The body is uniform in width for the first four-fifths of its length, then tapers gradually from about the 40th segment to the last segment. The first tergite features two longitudinal impressions that are wide but shallow, and the tergites from the second to the penultimate segments each feature two grooves. The sternites on the anterior part of the trunk, from the second sternite to about the 23rd sternite, feature a distinct median groove that divides into two short branches at the anterior end. A shallow longitudinal impression replaces this groove on the sternites on the posterior part of the trunk. There are no clusters of pores on the ventral surface of the trunk.

The posterior end of the last leg-bearing segment has a subtriangular ventral sclerite with a distinctly rounded posterior margin. This sclerite is short, no more than half as long as each of the adjacent basal elements of the ultimate legs. In adults, moderately numerous pores are scattered on the basal element of each of the ultimate legs, about 25 on the ventral surface, but also about ten on the dorsal surface. The ultimate legs have no pretarsus.

This species shares many traits with other centipedes in the genus Mecistocephalus. For example, like other species in this genus, M. evansi features a head that is evidently longer than wide and a body that tapers towards the posterior end. Furthermore, the coxosternite of the first maxillae is divided, but the coxosternite of the second maxillae is undivided.

This species shares a more distinctive set of traits with another species in the same genus, M. lifuensis. For example, like the species M. evansi, the species M. lifuensis features 51 leg pairs and a distinctly forked groove in the middle of the sternites. Furthermore, in both of these species, each lamella on the mandible features a row of teeth that extends all the way to the base, and the posterior margin of the labrum is completely devoid of bristles.

These two species can be distinguished, however, based on other traits. For example, the ultimate legs feature more pores in M. evansi, about 35 pores, including some on the dorsal surface, whereas these legs feature only about 20 pores in M. lifuensis. Furthermore, the anterior margin of the forcipular sternite features a pair of short teeth in M. lifuensis, but these teeth are absent in M. evansi. Moreover, the head is more rectangular in M. evansi than in M. lifuensis, which has a head that is wider in front than in back.
