= Mecistocephalus angusticeps =

Scientific classification
- Kingdom: Animalia
- Phylum: Arthropoda
- Subphylum: Myriapoda
- Class: Chilopoda
- Order: Geophilomorpha
- Family: Mecistocephalidae
- Genus: Mecistocephalus
- Species: M. angusticeps

Binomial name
- Mecistocephalus angusticeps (Ribaut, 1914)

Synonyms
- Lamnonyx angusticeps Ribaut, 1914

Species of centipede

Mecistocephalus angusticeps is species of soil centipede in the family Mecistocephalidae. This centipede is found in Kenya, Seychelles, and the Chagos Archipelago. This species features only 47 pairs of legs rather than the 49 leg pairs usually observed in the genus Mecistocephalus.

== Taxonomy and distribution ==
The French zoologist Henri Ribaut first described this species in 1914 based on a single adult female specimen found in 1911 in one of the Shimoni caves at sea level on the coast of Kenya. Ribaut originally described this species under the name Lamnonyx angusticeps. In 1920, the American biologist Ralph V. Chamberlain moved this species to the genus Mecistocephalus. Since then, this species has been found on several islands in the Indian Ocean. Finds have been recorded on islands in Seychelles (on Curieuse island, on Praslin island, and on Picard island and elsewhere on the Aldabra atoll) and on the Egmont Atoll in the Chagos Archipelago.

== Phylogeny ==
A phylogenetic analysis of 46 species in the family Mecistocephalidae based on morphology places M. angusticeps in a clade with two other Mecistocephalus species with only 47 pairs of legs, M. tahitiensis and an undescribed species found on the Marquesas islands in French Polynesia. This analysis places a clade with only 45 leg pairs in the most basal branch of a phylogenetic tree of the genus Mecistocephalus, with a sister group formed by species in this genus with 47 or more leg pairs, and the clade with only 47 leg pairs in the second most basal branch, with a sister group formed by species in this genus with 49 or more leg pairs. This analysis indicates that the common ancestor of the species in this genus had 45 leg pairs, and that species with more leg pairs evolved through a process that added segments and increased the number of legs incrementally, first to 47 pairs, then (for most species in the genus) to 49 pairs.

== Description ==
The species M. angusticeps has only 47 pairs of legs and reaches 50 mm in length. The body is mostly yellow, with fine dark pigmentation on the dorsal surface, but the head and most anterior segments are a reddish brown. The head is longer than wide, with a length/width ratio of about 1.7 or 1.8, and the antennae are three times as long as the head is wide. The dorsal surface of the head features a transverse frontal line that is uniformly concave forward. The pleurites on the side of the head (buccae) feature setae on the posterior half only. The areolate region in the anterior part of the clypeus includes a rounded area in the middle with finer areolation. The areolate part of the clypeus also features about six setae in a transverse band and another pair of setae to the rear near the middle of the posterior margin, just in front of the smooth part of the clypeus.

The mandible features about seven pectinate lamellae (comb blades), with about six teeth on the first lamella and about eleven teeth on the average intermediate lamella. The second maxillae are slender, each with a claw that tapers uniformly to a pointed tip. The first article of the forcipules features a small proximal tubercle and a similar distal tubercle, the intermediate articles each feature a small tubercle, and the ultimate article features only a shallow emergence at the base. The sternites of the leg-bearing segments feature a groove down the middle that is not forked.

This species exhibits many traits that characterize the genus Mecistocephalus. For example, like other species in this genus, M. angusticeps features a head with a transverse frontal line, a coxosternite of the first maxillae that is divided down the middle by a suture, and an undivided coxosternite of the second maxillae. Furthermore, like other species in this genus, M. angusticeps features a head that is evidently longer than wide, buccae with setae, second maxillae with claws, and a longitudinal groove on the trunk sternites.

This species shares more distinctive features with its close relative M. tahitiensis. For example, the species M. angusticeps and M. tahitiensis each feature only 47 leg pairs rather than the 49 pairs usually observed in the genus Mecistocephalus. Furthermore, in each of these species, the buccae feature setae on the posterior half only, the clypeus features a pair of setae in the middle of the clypeus posterior to all the other clypeal setae, and the furrow on the trunk sternites is not forked at the anterior end.

The species M. angusticeps can be distinguished from its close relative M. tahitiensis, however, based on other traits. For example, the anterior part of the clypeus in M. angusticeps features a conspicuous area with finer or reduced reticulation in the middle of the areolate part. In M. tahitiensis, however, the entire anterior part of the clypeus is evidently and evenly reticulated. Furthermore, the areolate area in the middle of the coxosternite of the second maxillae in M. tahitiensis features smooth areas surrounded by areolation, but these smooth islands are absent in M. angusticeps. Moreover, the lateral parts of the clypeus in M. tahitiensis feature groups of sensilla shaped like buttons, but these lateral groups are absent in M. angusticeps.
