= Mecistocephalus lifuensis =

Scientific classification
- Kingdom: Animalia
- Phylum: Arthropoda
- Subphylum: Myriapoda
- Class: Chilopoda
- Order: Geophilomorpha
- Family: Mecistocephalidae
- Genus: Mecistocephalus
- Species: M. lifuensis

Binomial name
- Mecistocephalus lifuensis Pocock, 1899

Species of centipede

Mecistocephalus lifuensis is a species of soil centipede in the Mecistocephalidae family. This centipede is found in New Caledonia, a French overseas territory in Melanesia. This species is notable for featuring 51 pairs of legs rather than the 49 leg pairs usually observed in the genus Mecistocephalus.

== Discovery and taxonomy ==
This species was first described in 1898 by the British zoologist Reginald Innes Pocock. He based the original description of this species on type material found on Lifou Island in New Caledonia. In 1923, the French zoologist Henri Ribaut placed this species in the genus Lamnonyx, which Pocock and others deemed to be a junior synonym for Mecistocephalus. Authorities now agree that Mecistocephalus is the valid name for Lamnonyx.

== Phylogeny ==
A phylogenetic analysis of the family Mecistocephalidae based on morphology places M. lifuensis in a clade nested among Mecistocephalus species with 49 leg pairs in a phylogenetic tree. This analysis indicates that the ancestor of M. lifuensis had 49 leg pairs. Thus, this species evolved from this ancestor through a process that added two leg-bearing segments and two leg pairs.

== Description ==
This species has 51 pairs of legs and can reach 41 mm in length. The body is yellow, but the head is a reddish shade of brown. The dorsal plate on the head features two prominent grooves on the posterior surface. This cephalic plate is elongated and narrower at the back, with a straight posterior margin only 0.65 as wide as the anterior margin. The cephalic plate is 1.75 times as long as its width at the front. The mandibles each feature seven pectinate lamellae (comb blades), with six teeth on the first lamella bearing six teeth and ten to thirteen teeth on the middle lamellae. The sternite of the forcipular segment is slightly wider than long and features a wide groove down the middle. The first article of each forcipule features two tubercles on the inner margin, each intermediate article features one tubercle on the inner margin, and the claw features a small denticle at the base.

The first pair of legs is short, only two-thirds as long as the legs of the second pair. The tergites feature two furrows. Each sternite on the anterior segments features a groove down the middle that is Y-shaped. The fork in this groove disappears at about the 23rd segment. The sternite of the last leg-bearing segment is broad at the anterior margin but narrows like a triangle at the posterior end. The basal element of each of the ultimate legs feature only about 20 large scattered pores. The ultimate legs are slender and lack claws. The telson is shaped like a triangle pointed toward the posterior end, with a broad base and anal pores.

This species shares many traits with other centipedes in the genus Mecistocephalus. For example, like other species in this genus, M. lifuensis features a head with a transverse frontal line, a coxosternite of the first maxillae that is divided down the middle by a suture, and an undivided coxosternite of the second maxillae. Furthermore, like other species in this genus, M. lifuensis features a head that is evidently longer than wide and slender ultimate legs.

This species shares a more distinctive set of traits with another species in the same genus, M. evansi. For example, like the species M. lifuensis, the species M. evansi features 51 leg pairs and a distinctly forked groove in the middle of the sternites. Furthermore, in both of these species, each lamella on the mandible features a row of teeth that extends all the way to the base, and the posterior margin of the labrum is completely devoid of bristles.

These two species can be distinguished, however, based on other traits. For example, the ultimate legs feature more pores in M. evansi, about 35 pores, including some on the dorsal surface, whereas these legs feature only about 20 pores in M. lifuensis. Furthermore, the anterior margin of the forcipular sternite features a pair of short teeth in M. lifuensis, but these teeth are absent in M. evansi. Moreover, the head in M. evansi is more rectangular, with nearly the same width in the back as in the front, whereas the head in M. lifuensis is wider in front than in back.

== Distribution ==
The species M. lifuensis is found in New Caledonia, where this centipede has been recorded not only on the main island but also on the Loyalty Islands. On the principal island of Grande Terre, this species has been recorded in the commune of Koné in the North Province. In the Loyalty Islands Province, this species has been recorded in the communes of Lifou and Maré.
