= Erich Haase =

German physician and entomologist (1859–1894)

Erich Haase (January 19, 1859, in Berlin – April 24, 1894, in Bangkok) was a German physician and entomologist. He was Director of the Royal Siamese Museum in Bangkok. He died of dysentery.

== Legacy ==
As well as many short scientific papers on insects, Myriapoda and Chilopoda, he wrote:

- Untersuchungen über die Mimicry auf Grundlage eines natürlichen Systema der Papilioniden. Erster Theil: Entwurf eines natürlichen Systems der Papilioniden - Bibliotheca zoologica (Stuttgart) 8(1), pp. vi + 1–12, pls. 1–2, 5-8(1891–92).
- Die Indisch-Australischen Myriopoden. I. Chilopoden. Abhandlungen und Berichte des K. Zoologischen und Anthropologisch-Ethnographischen Museums zu Dresden 1886/87 (5): 1–118.
