= Filippo Silvestri =

Italian entomologist (1873–1949)

- Born: June 22, 1873; Bevagna
- Died: June 10, 1949 (aged 75); Portici
- Scientific career
- Fields: Entomology

Filippo Silvestri (22 June 1873 – 10 June 1949) was an Italian entomologist. He specialised in world Protura, Thysanura, Diplura and Isoptera, but also worked on Hymenoptera, Myriapoda, Italian Diptera and South American ground pearls, scale insects (Hemiptera: Coccomorpha) from the family Margarodidae. He is also noted for describing and naming the previously unknown order Zoraptera. In 1938 he was nominated to the Pontifical Academy of Sciences, the scientific academy of the Vatican.

Silvestri was born in Bevagna. A keen young naturalist, he became assistant to Giovanni Battista Grassi (1854–1925), Director of the Institute of Anatomical Research of the University of Rome. In 1904, Silvestri became Director of the Institute of Entomology and Zoology at the agricultural college in Portici (the Laboratorio di Zoologia Generale e Agraria, now Faculty of Agriculture), a position he held for 45 years. He discovered polyembryony in the 1930s while working on Litomatix truncatellus Hymenoptera. His collection is in the Museo Civico di Storia Naturale di Genova. Duplicates of Isoptera are in the Swedish Museum of Natural History and a few Diplopoda (millipede) types are in the Museum für Naturkunde Berlin.

Filippo Sivestri has been commemorated in the names of the following: a square in his home town, Bevagna; a high school in Portici, the town where he worked and died; and a street in Rome (00134 Borgo Lotti).

A species of South American worm lizard, Amphisbaena silvestrii is named in his honor.

Publications on termites.

- Nota preliminare sui termitidi sud-americani. Bollettino dei Musei di Zoologia e Anatomia Comparata della Università di Torino XVI(389):1-8.( 1901)
- Contribuzione alla conoscenza dei Termiti e Termitofili dell'America Meridionale. Redia 1:1-234. .( 1903)
- Isoptera. In: Die Fauna Südwest-Australia. Vol. 2, edited by W. Michaelsen & R. Hartmeyer. pp. 279–314. .( 1909)
- Contribuzione alla conoscenza dei Termitidi e Termitofili dell'Africa occidentale. Bollettino del Laboratorio di Zoologia General e Agraria, Portici 9:1-146. .( 1914)
- Descriptiones termitum in Anglorum Guiana. Zoologica 3(16):307-321. .( 1923)
- Descrizioni di due nuove specie di Isoptera dell'Africa. Bollettino del Laboratorio di Zoologia Generale e Agraria, Portici 21:91-95. .( 1928)
- Nuovo concetto di fasi corrispondenti all'età della colonia negli individui di una stessa specie componenti una colonia di termiti e descrizione di due specie nuove di Syntermes. Bollettino del Laboratorio di Entomologia Agraria, Portici 6:1-14 (1946).
