= Chestnut (color) =

Reddish-brown colour

Color coordinates
- Hex triplet: #954535
- sRGB^{B} (r, g, b): (149, 69, 53)
- HSV (h, s, v): (10°, 64%, 58%)
- CIELCh_{uv} (L, C, h): (39, 63, 19°)
- Source: Maerz and Paul
- ISCC–NBS descriptor: Strong reddish brown
- B: Normalized to [0–255] (byte)

Chestnut or castaneous is a colour, a medium reddish shade of brown (displayed right), and is named after the nut of the chestnut tree. An alternate name for the colour is badious.

Indian red is a similar but separate and distinct colour from chestnut.

Chestnut is also a very dark tan that almost appears brown.

== Etymology ==
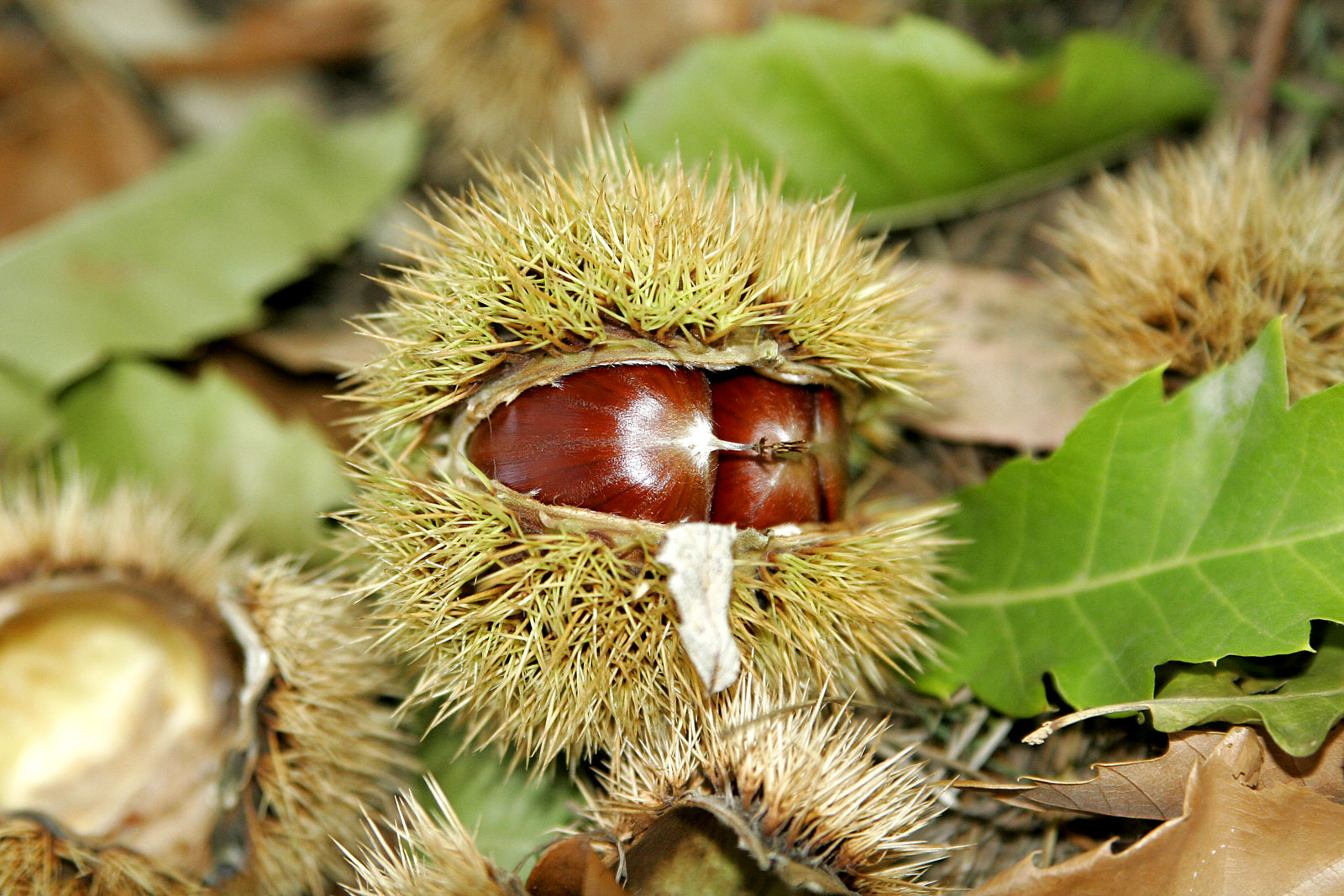
Chestnuts can be found on the ground around chestnut trees.

The name chestnut derives from the colour of the nut of the chestnut tree. The first recorded use of chestnut as a colour term in English was in 1555. The colour maroon is also named after the chestnut (via French marron).

== Variations of chestnut ==
=== Deep chestnut ===
Chestnut (Crayola)

Color coordinates
- Hex triplet: #B94E48
- sRGB^{B} (r, g, b): (185, 78, 72)
- HSV (h, s, v): (3°, 61%, 73%)
- CIELCh_{uv} (L, C, h): (47, 83, 14°)
- Source: Crayola
- ISCC–NBS descriptor: Dark reddish orange
- B: Normalized to [0–255] (byte)

Deep chestnut is the colour called chestnut in Crayola crayons. This colour was also produced in a special limited edition in which it was called Vermont maple syrup.

At the request of educators worried that children (mistakenly) believed the name represented the skin colour of Native Americans, Crayola changed the name of their crayon colour "Indian Red", originally formulated in 1958, to "Chestnut" in 1999. In reality, the colour Indian red has nothing to do with American Indians but is an iron oxide pigment the use of which is popular in India.

== Chestnut in nature ==
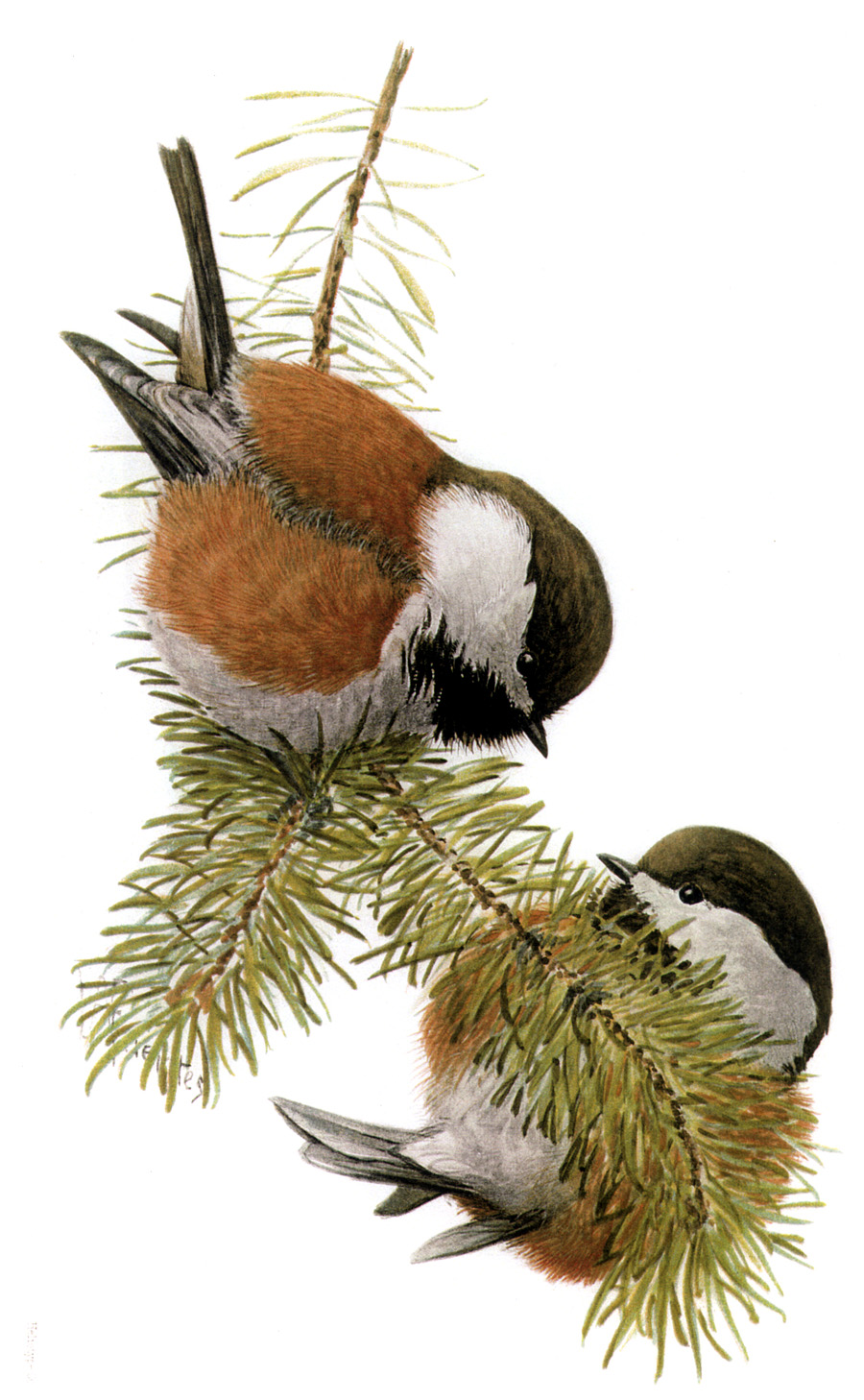
Chestnut-backed chickadee

- The chestnut-coloured woodpecker
- The chestnut-backed chickadee
- The coat of the bongo

== Chestnut in human culture ==
Animal husbandry

- Chestnut is a coat colour of horses.

Cosmetology

- Brown chestnut hair is a human hair colour.

== See also ==
- List of colours
- Chestnut (coat)—chestnut-coated horses
