= Ultimate legs =

Pair of modified rear legs unique to centipedes

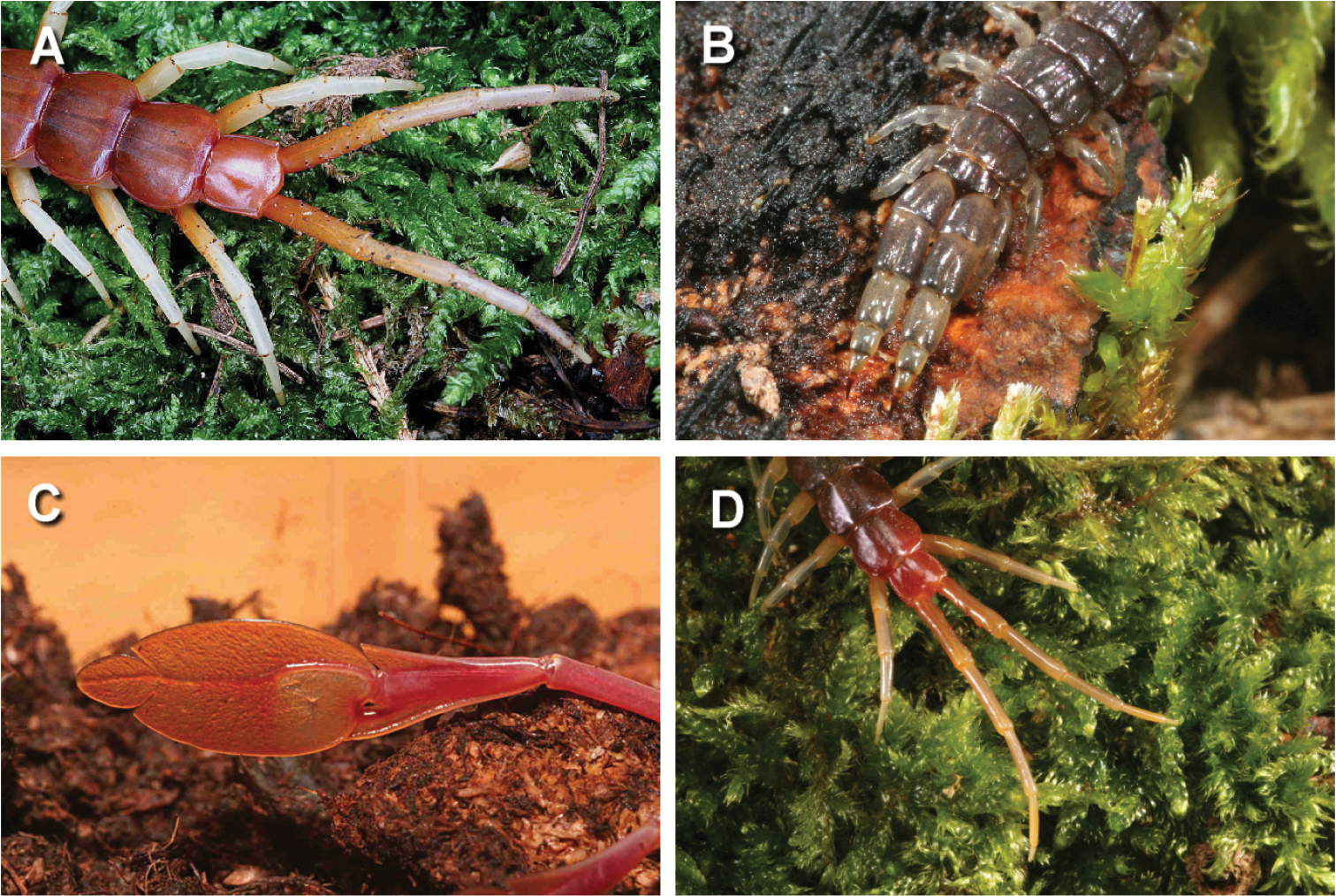

Details
- Synonyms: Anal legs, caudal legs, terminal legs
- Origins: Legs
- Function: Varied: defensive postures, mating rituals, anchoring

Ultimate legs are a pair of modified rear legs unique to centipedes. Although they do not aid in locomotion, ultimate legs possess a variety of uses, and their morphology varies accordingly.

Sexual dimorphism is frequently present.

== Usage ==
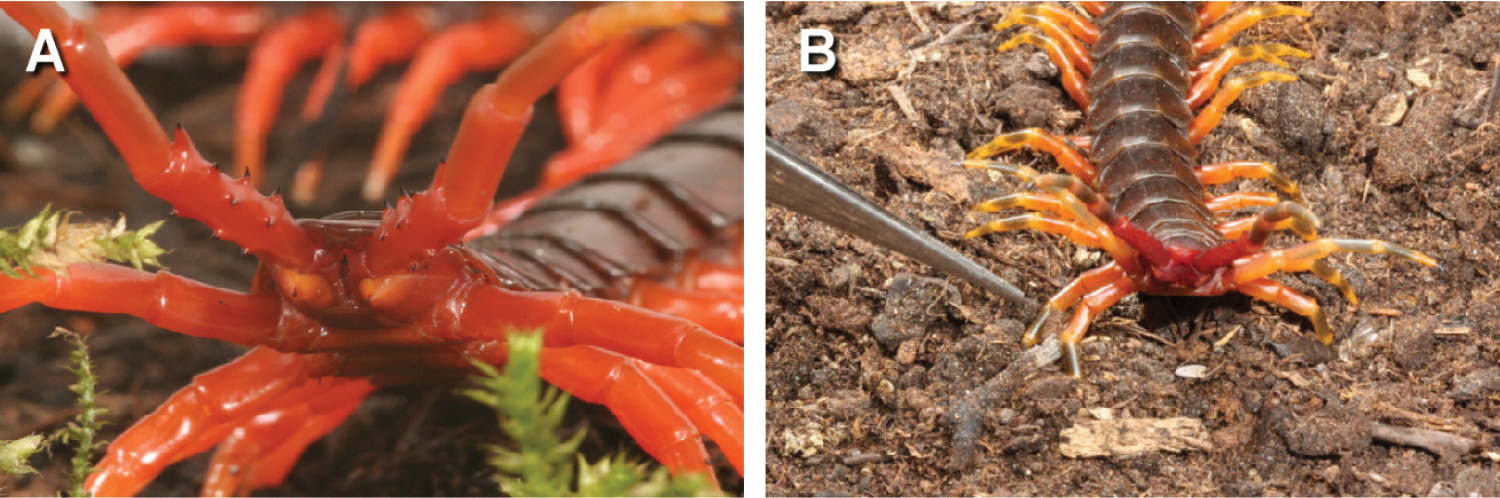
Warning postures of Scolopendra spinosissima and S. galapagoensis

=== As a defence against predators ===
In many species, ultimate legs are used in warning postures to scare off predators. The ultimate legs are raised, splayed, and sometimes waved back and forth. The presence of spines on the ultimate legs of some species also serves a defensive role- as Lewis & Kronmüller (2015) put it, "a predator approaching from behind would come into contact with a battery of spines."

=== As a means of sound production ===
Members of the genus Alipes, as well as some other centipedes, stridulate their leaf-like ultimate legs, possibly as a way to warn off predators, or as a distraction by encouraging the predator to focus on the legs, which would then be autotomized to help the centipede escape.

In some of those species, including Alipes grandidieri and Rhysida immarginata togoensis, the legs continue to stridulate for over half a minute after being detached.

=== For suspension ===
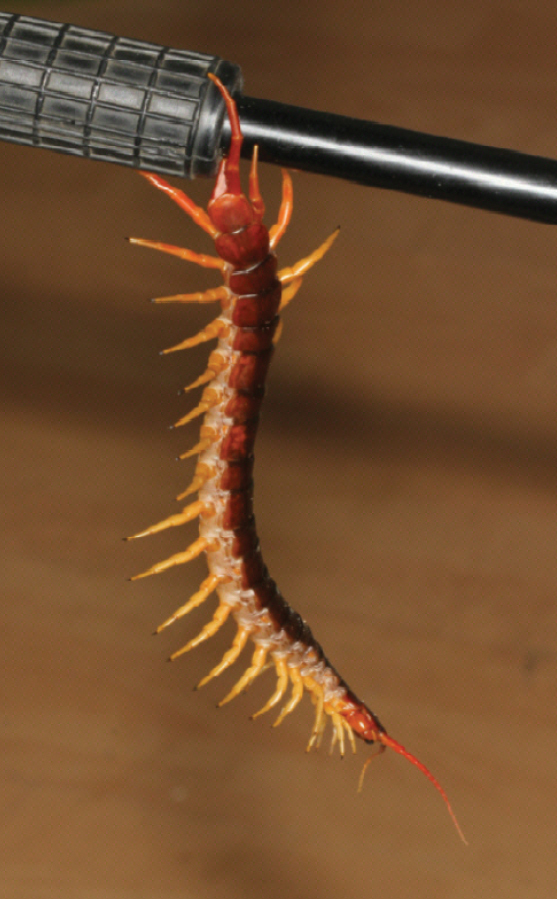
Scolopendra dehaani hanging from just its ultimate legs.

Some species use their ultimate legs to hang or anchor themselves from trees or other desired objects. This has been recorded as playing a role in predation; the centipede suspends itself in the air and swings back and forth to capture prey.

=== In contact with other centipedes ===
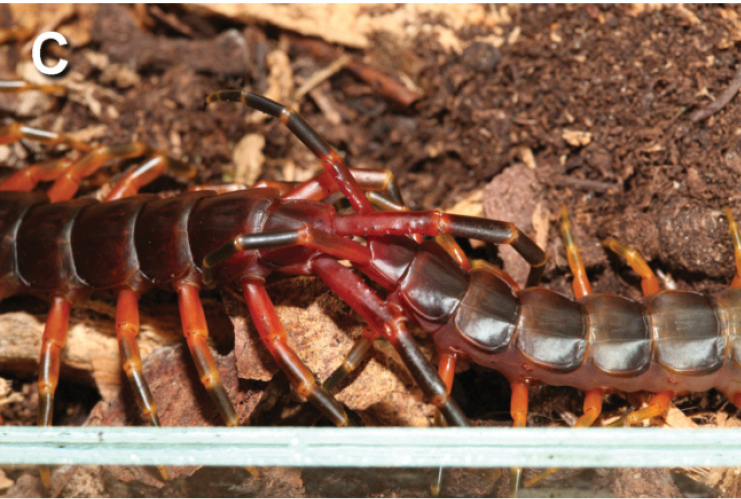
Scolopendra galapagoensis interlocking ultimate legs before mating.

Before mating, many species of Scolopendrid centipedes interlock ultimate legs. A similar behaviour has been recorded in ordinary meetings, wherein each centipede grasps the other's trunk with its ultimate legs. This possibly serves as a way to defuse aggression, and in some species may be held for several minutes.

During mating, Scutigera coleoptrata raise and lower their ultimate legs, along with their antennae.
