= Forcipule =

Appendage unique to centipedes

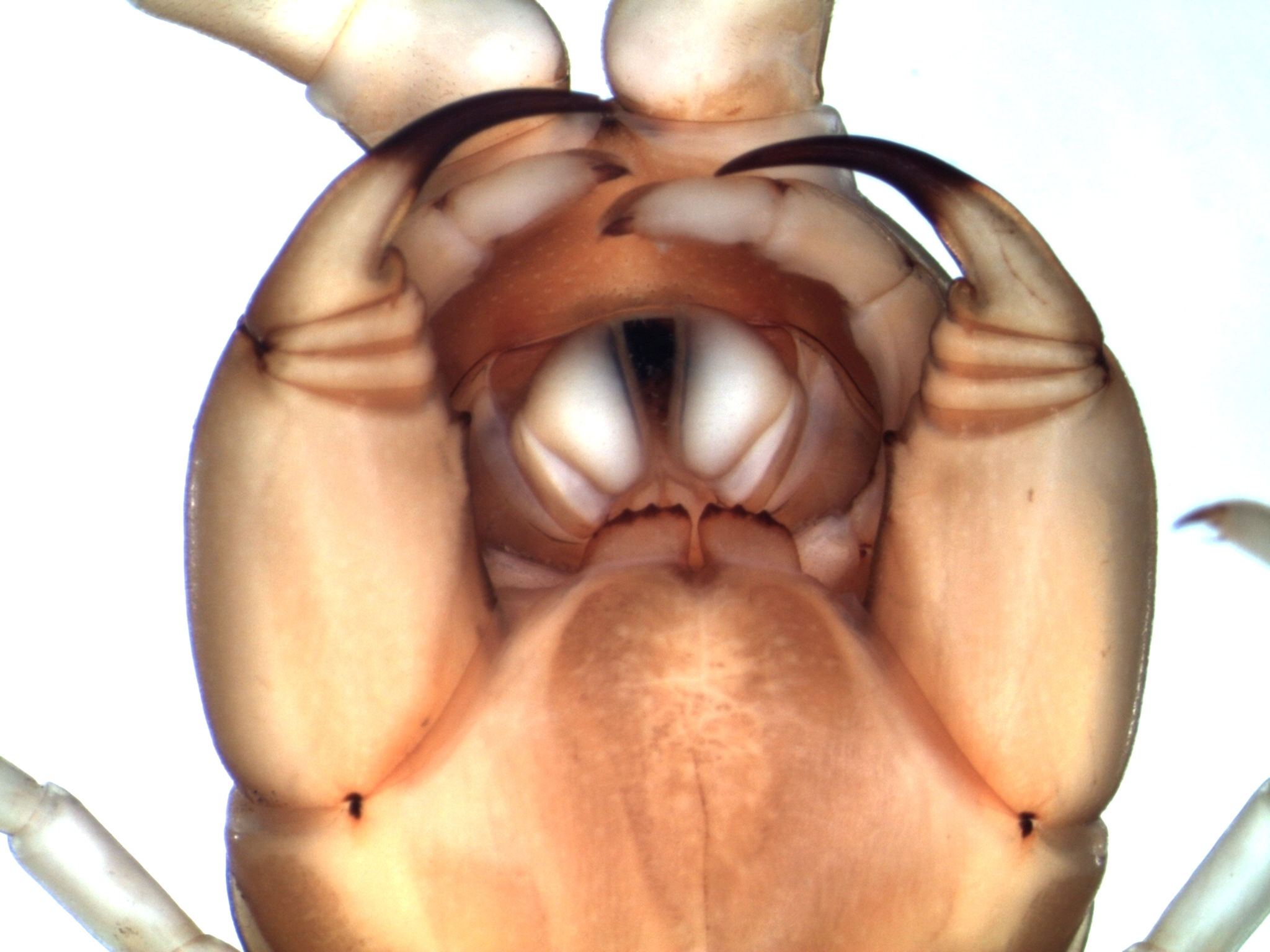

Forcipules are the modified, pincer-like front legs of centipedes that are used to inject venom into prey. They are the only known examples of front legs acting as venom injectors.

== Nomenclature ==
Forcipules go by a variety of names in both scientific and colloquial usages. They are sometimes known as poison-claws or jaw legs, referencing their evolution from maxillipeds, a term which they are also sometimes known by in the context of centipedes (maxillipeds, maxillipedes). Other names include prehensors, telopodites, and forcipulae (singular forcipula). In the specific case in which the forcipules are used to inject venom, they are called toxicognaths (from English toxic 'toxic' and Ancient Greek γνάθος (gnathos) 'jaw').

The term forcipule references their similarity to forceps.

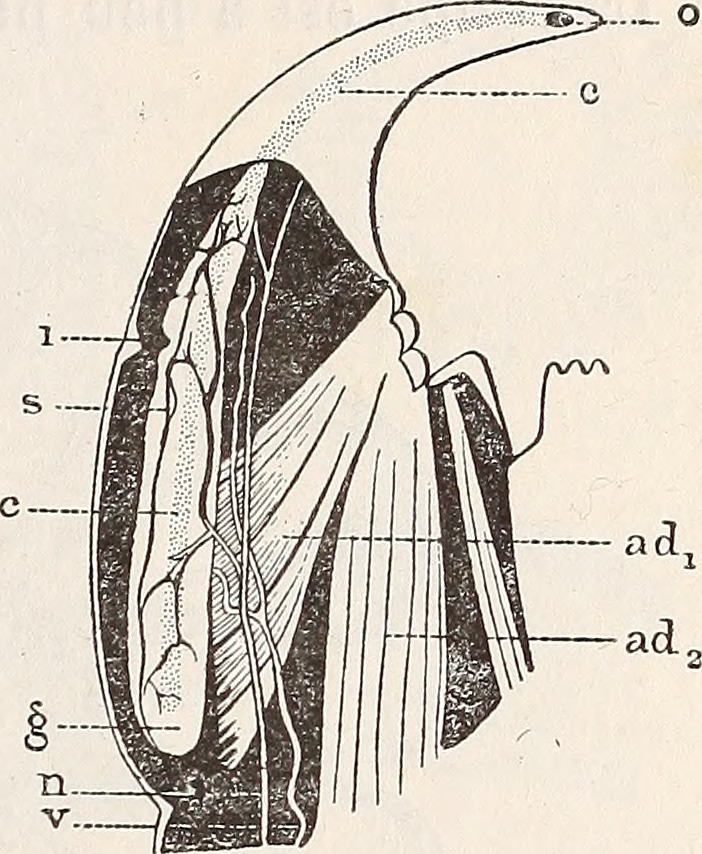
Scientific illustration of a forcipule

== Anatomy, systematics, and variation ==
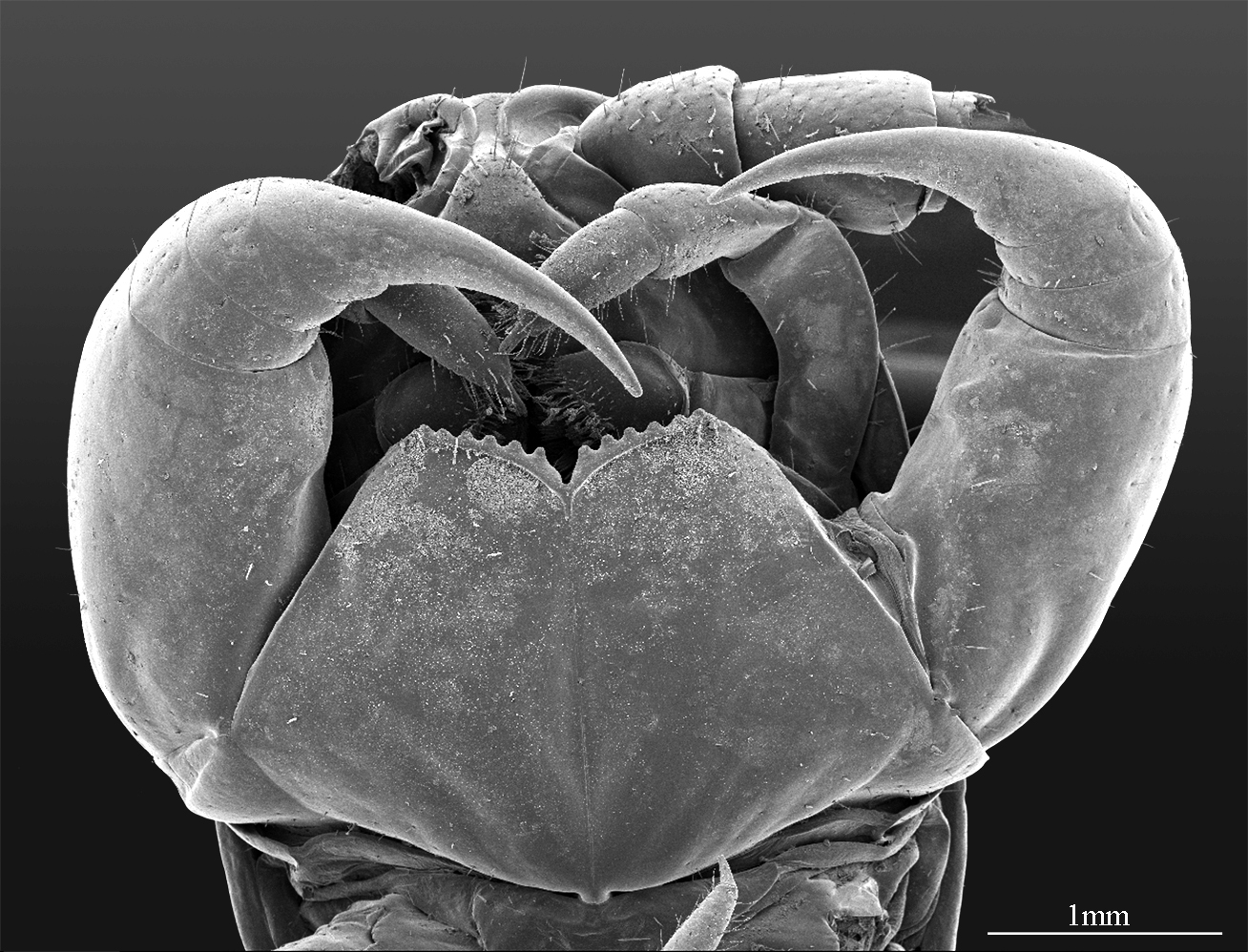
The forcipules of Eupolybothrus cavernicolus (Lithobiidae)

Forcipules evolved from the maxillipeds (a pair of limb appendages) of centipedes' last common ancestor, believed to be somewhat scutigeromorph-like. They were initially leg-like, then progressed into a more pincer or claw-like shape, as seen today, and became restricted to horizontal movement. The forcipules of modern Scutigeromorphs are the most significantly different in shape: they are more leg-like, and cannot hold prey in the way that they are used among other orders, but are used for envenomation only, making their use more comparable to a knife than a pincer.
