= Myriapodology =

Scientific study of myriapods; a branch of zoology

Myriapodology is the scientific study of myriapods which includes centipedes and millipedes. The field of myriapodology can also cover other myriapods such as pauropods and symphylans. Those who study myriapods are myriapodologists.

== Societies ==
- International Society of Myriapodology

== Journals ==
- International Journal of Myriapodology
- Myriapodologica (ceased publication in 2008)
- Myriapod Memoranda

== Notable myriapodologists ==
- Carl Attems (1868–1952), Austrian zoologist, described over 1,000 species
- Stanley Graham Brade-Birks (1887–1982), English myriapodologist who with Hilda K Brade-Birks authored Notes on Myriapoda: 23 papers jointly from 1916 to the 1920s; then twelve more solo until 1939
- Henry W. Brolemann (1860–1933), French myriapodologist, described around 500 species
- Ralph Vary Chamberlin (1879–1967), American arachnologist and myriapodologist, described over 1,000 species
- Orator F. Cook (1867–1949), American botanist and myriapodologist, co-described world's second leggiest species, Illacme plenipes
- Richard L. Hoffman (1927–2012), American entomologist, described over 600 myriapod taxa
- C. A. W. Jeekel (1922–2010), Dutch entomologist, produced the Nomenclator Generum et Familiarum Diplopodorum which pioneered modern millipede taxonomy
- Otto Kraus (1930–2017), German myriapodologist and arachnologist, described nearly 500 species
- Robert Latzel (1845–1919), Austrian myriapodologist, pioneered use of gonopods in taxonomy
- Harold F. Loomis (1896–1976) American botanist and myriapodologist, described over 300 species
- Paola Manfredi (1889–1989) Italian myriapodologist
- Yu-Hsi Wang Moltze (1910–1968), Chinese myriapodologist
- Filippo Silvestri (1873–1949), Italian entomologist, described over 600 species
- Ödön Tömösváry (1852–1884), Hungarian naturalist, namesake of organ of Tömösváry
- Karl Wilhelm Verhoeff (1867–1944), German entomologist, described over 1,000 myriapod species
