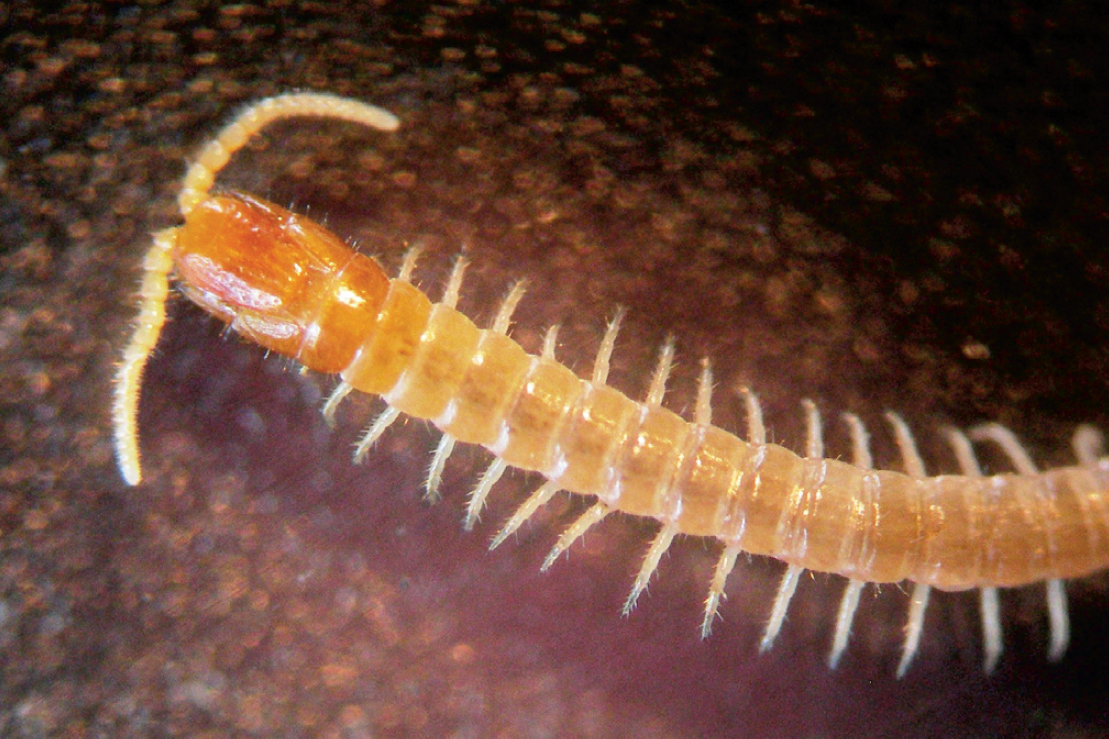
- Tygarrup javanicus

Scientific classification
- Kingdom: Animalia
- Phylum: Arthropoda
- Subphylum: Myriapoda
- Class: Chilopoda
- Order: Geophilomorpha
- Suborder: Placodesmata; Bollman, 1893
- Family: Mecistocephalidae (Bollman, 1893)

Genera
- See text

= Mecistocephalidae =

Family of centipedes

Mecistocephalidae is a monophyletic family of centipedes in the order Geophilomorpha. This family is the only family in the monotypic suborder Placodesmata. Most species in this family live in tropical or subtropical regions, but some occur in temperate regions. This family is the third most diverse in the order Geophiliomorpha (after Geophilidae and Schendylidae), with about 170 species, including about 130 species in the genus Mecistocephalus.

== Description ==
Species of this family are characterized by an elongated head with lateral margins converging backwards; first maxillae with a relatively elongate coxosternite and coxal projections that are much wider than the telopodites, with both appendages ending with a distinctly hyaline part; second maxillae with small simple claws; an elongate forcipular coxosternite with pleurites projecting anteriorly into scapular points and displaced dorsally so that the coxopleural sutures run anteriorly on the dorsal side; metatergites on the posterior part of the trunk that are distinctly longer than those on the anterior part.

This family differs from all other geophilomorphs insofar as the number of segments in mecistocephalids is generally fixed within each species and the same for each sex. The family includes centipedes with odd numbers of leg-bearing segments ranging from as few as 41 to as many as 101. A majority of the species in the genus Mecistocephalus have 49 pairs of legs, a majority so large that most species in the family Mecistocephalidae have 49 leg pairs, even though only one mecistocephalid species (Proterotaiwanella sculptulata) outside the genus Mecistocephalus shares this number.

The next most common numbers are 45 leg pairs, found in most species in the genus Tygarrup as well as in species distributed among five other genera, and 41 leg pairs, found in all species in the genera Agnostrup, Anarrup, Arrup, Nannarrup, and Partygarrupius as well as in some species of Dicellophilus; fewer mecistocephalid species have 47 leg pairs (e.g., Mecistocephalus angusticeps and M. tahitiensis) or 51 leg pairs (e.g., M. evansi and M. lifuensis), found only in the genus Mecistocephalus, and the other remaining numbers are even more rare (e.g., 43 leg pairs, found in Dicellophilus carniolensis).

Intraspecific variation in the number of leg-bearing segments within each sex has been recorded among the mecistocephalid species with the greatest number of legs: Mecistocephalus diversisternus, which has 57 or 59 leg pairs, M. japonicus, which has 63 or 65 leg pairs, and M. microporus, which has odd numbers of leg pairs ranging from 93 to 101. Other mecistocephalid species with many legs are known from samples too small to provide persuasive evidence of intraspecific invariance (e.g., M. cyclops, with 57 leg pairs in the only known specimen). The mecistocephalid species Krateraspis sselivanovi has 53 leg pairs without intraspecific variation, which may be the maximum number evidently fixed by species in the class Chilopoda.

== Genera ==
This family includes the following genera distributed among three subfamilies:

Subfamily Arrupinae Chamberlin, 1912

- Agnostrup Foddai, Bonato, Pereira & Minelli, 2003
- Arrup Chamberlin, 1912
- Nannarrup Foddai, Bonato, Pereira & Minelli, 2003
- Partygarrupius Verhoeff, 1939

Subfamily Dicellophilinae Cook, 1896

- Anarrup Chamberlin, 1920
- Dicellophilus Cook, 1896
- Proterotaiwanella Bonato, Foddai & Minelli, 2002

Subfamily Mecistocephalinae Bollman, 1893

- Krateraspis Lignau, 1929
- Mecistocephalus Newport, 1843
- Takashimaia Miyosi, 1955
- Tygarrup Chamberlin, 1914
