= Partygarrupius =

Scientific classification
- Kingdom: Animalia
- Phylum: Arthropoda
- Subphylum: Myriapoda
- Class: Chilopoda
- Order: Geophilomorpha
- Family: Mecistocephalidae
- Genus: Partygarrupius; Verhoeff, 1939
- Species: P. moiwaensis

Binomial name
- Partygarrupius moiwaensis (Takakuwa, 1934)

Genus of centipede

Partygarrupius is a monotypic genus of soil centipede in the family Mecistocephilidae. The only species in this genus is Partygarrupius moiwaensis. This centipede is found in Japan. This species features 41 pairs of legs without intraspecific variation and can reach 30 mm in length.

== Taxonomy and phylogeny ==
This species was first described in 1934 by the Japanese myriapodologist Yosioki Takakuwa. He based the original description of this species on a female holotype found on Mount Moiwa near Sapporo on the island of Hokkaido in Japan. He originally described this species under the name Tygarrup moiwaensis.

In 1939, the German zoologist Karl W. Verhoeff proposed Partygarrupius as a subgenus within the genus Tygarrup to contain the species T. moiwaensis. In 2003, the biologists Donatella Foddai, Lucio Bonato, Luis Alberto Pereira, and Alessandro Minelli elevated Partygarrupius to the genus rank. These authors also placed the genus Partygarrupius in the subfamily Arrupinae, along with the genera Agnostrup, Arrup, and Nannarrup, based on similarities in morphology among these four genera. A phylogenetic analysis based on morphology placed the genus Partygarrupius by itself on the most basal branch of a phylogenetic tree of this subfamily.

== Description ==
This centipede can reach 30 mm in length and features 41 leg-bearing segments. The body is a homogeneous yellow-brown, without any darker patches. The head is about 1.2 times as long as wide, with a transverse frontal line on the dorsal surface. The posterior part of the clypeus features a single large smooth area (plagula) without any areolate stripe down the middle. This plagula covers most of the clypeus and extends along the lateral margins. Setae are arranged in a transverse band crossing the middle of the anterior half of the clypeus. The pleurites on the sides of the head lack setae. The mandible features about eight pectinate lamellae.

The coxosternite of the first maxillae is divided by a suture down the middle, but the coxosternite of the second maxillae is undivided. Each of telopodites of the second maxillae ends in a long thin claw, but these telopodites are poorly developed and reach only slightly beyond the first maxillae. The forcipular tergum is slightly wider than long, with no furrow down the middle. The first article of the forcipule features one distal tooth, and the ultimate article features one basal tooth. The sternum of the trunk segments features a furrow that is not forked. The telson features anal pores.

The genus Partygarrupius exhibits many distinctive traits that characterize the subfamily Arrupinae. For example, the genus Partygarrupius features 41 leg pairs, like all other genera in the subfamily Arrupinae and unlike the genus Tygarrup, which features 43 or 45 leg pairs. Furthermore, as in other members of this subfamily, the telopodites of the second maxillae in Partygarrupius extend no more than slightly beyond the first maxillae, whereas these telopodites reach distinctly beyond the first maxillae in Tygrarrup. Other features, however, distinguish the genus Partygarrupius from its relatives in the subfamily Arrupinae. For example, in all the other genera in this subfamily, an areolate stripe down the middle of the clypeus usually divides the plagula into two lateral parts.

== Distribution ==
This centipede is known only from the island of Hokkaido in Japan. The species P. moiwaensis has been recorded not only at the type locality (Mount Moiwa) but also at the foot of Mount Poroshiri. A record of this species on the coast of Brazil was associated with plants imported from Japan and thus probably reflects introduction by humans.
