= Arrup mamaevi =

Scientific classification
- Kingdom: Animalia
- Phylum: Arthropoda
- Subphylum: Myriapoda
- Class: Chilopoda
- Order: Geophilomorpha
- Family: Mecistocephalidae
- Genus: Arrup
- Species: A. mamaevi

Binomial name
- Arrup mamaevi (Titova, 1975)

Synonyms
- Prolamnonyx mamaevi Titova, 1975

Species of centipede

Arrup mamaevi is a species of soil centipede in the family Mecistocephalidae. This centipede is one of only two species of Arrup found in Russia. This centipede is also one of only five species in the family Mecistocephalidae found in Russia. This species features 41 pairs of legs and can reach 32 mm in length.

== Discovery and taxonomy ==
This species was first described in 1975 by the Russian myriapodologist Lidia P. Titova. She based the original description of this species on a female holotype found in 1964 under the bark and in the wood of a Chosenia tree in the Kedrovaya Pad nature reserve in the Maritime Territory (Primorsky Krai) of Russia. This holotype is deposited in the Zoological Museum of Moscow State University.

In 1969, Titova initially assigned this specimen to a similar species under the name Prolamnonyx holstii, before describing this centipede as a new species in 1975 under the name Prolamnonyx mamaevi. In 2003, the biologists Donatella Foddai, Lucio Bonato, Luis Alberto Pereira, and Alessandro Minelli moved this species into the genus Arrup. Authorities now consider Prolamnonyx to be a junior synonym of Arrup.

== Description ==
The species A. mamaevi features 41 leg-bearing segments and can reach 32 mm in length and 2 mm in width. The body is usually yellow, with the head and antennae slightly darker. The dorsal plate on the head is about 1.6 times longer than wide and features a distinct transverse suture. Each side of the head features two or three setae on the pleurite. Each antenna is about four times as long as the maximum width of the head. The areolate area on the anterior part of the clypeus is four times longer than the smooth areas on the posterior part (plagulae). Each mandible usually features seven lamellae with six to eleven teeth on each lamella. The second maxillae lack claws.

The first article of the forcipule features a large but obtuse distal tooth, and the ultimate article features a large pointed basal tooth, but the second and third articles feature only small bulges. The tergite of the forcipular segment is about 1.9 times wider than long. The calyx of the poison gland in the forcipule reaches the distal part of the first article in each sex. The sternites of the second through the ninth leg-bearing segments feature a longitudinal groove in the middle. The sternite of the last leg-bearing segment is shaped like a trapezoid with the anterior margin usually about twice as wide as the posterior margin. The basal element of each of the ultimate legs features from 27 to 35 pores scattered on the ventral and lateral surfaces. The telson features large anal pores.

This species exhibits many traits that characterize the genus Arrup. For example, this species features 41 leg pairs and an areolate stripe down the middle of the clypeus between two plagulae that do not extend to the lateral margins of the clypeus. Furthermore, as in other species in this genus, both the coxosternite of the first maxillae and the coxosternite of the second maxillae are undivided, the second maxillae do not reach distinctly beyond the first maxillae, the tergite of the forcipular segment is distinctly wider than long, and the first article of the forcipule features only a distal tooth. Unlike other species of Arrup, however, the species A. mamaevi features setae on the pleurites on the sides of the head.

This species shares some distinctive traits with another species in the same genus, A. holstii, a Japanese species with which A. mamaevi was initially confused. For example, the areolate part of the clypeus in these species is at least four times longer than the plagulae. Furthermore, in each of these two species, a frontal line is evident on the head, the second maxillae lack claws, and the ultimate article of the forcipule features a basal tooth.

The species A. mamaevi can be distinguished from A. holstii, however, based on other traits. For example, the pleurites on the sides of the head feature setae in A. mamaevi but not in A. holstii. Furthermore, the poison calyx inside the forcipule of the male of the species A. holstii is longer, extending to the posterior part of the forcipular sternite, whereas this channel reaches only the distal part of the first article in the species A. mamaevi. Moreover, the ultimate legs feature more pores in A. mamaevi, with 27 to 35 pores on each leg, whereas each of the ultimate legs in A. holstii features only about 12 pores.

The species A. mamaevi also shares some distinctive traits with the only other species of Arrup found in Russia, A. dentatus. For example, in both of these species, the poison calyx in the forcipule reaches only the distal part of the first article in each sex. Furthermore, in each of these species, the head features a transverse frontal line, the first article of the forcipule features a large distal tooth, and the ultimate article of the forcipule features a pointed basal tooth.

The species A. mamaevi can be distinguished from A. dentatus, however, based on other traits. For example, the pleurites on the sides of the head feature setae in A. mamaevi but not in A. dentatus. Furthermore, the third article of the forcipule features a well developed tooth in A. dentatus but only a small bulge in A. mamaevi. Moreover, the areolate part of the clypeus is four times longer than the plagulae in A. mamaevi but no more than 2.5 times longer than the plagulae in A. dentatus.

== Distribution and habitat ==
The species A. mamaevi is known only from the Maritime Territory (Primorsky Krai) of the Russian Far East. In Primorsky Krai, this centipede has been found not only in the wood of a Chosenia tree at the type locality (Kedrovaya Pad) but also in the soil and litter of a Querqus forest in the city of Ussuriysky This species has also been recorded in the district of Khassansky in Primorsky Krai.
