= Dicellophilus carniolensis =

Scientific classification
- Kingdom: Animalia
- Phylum: Arthropoda
- Subphylum: Myriapoda
- Class: Chilopoda
- Order: Geophilomorpha
- Family: Mecistocephalidae
- Genus: Dicellophilus
- Species: D. carniolensis

Binomial name
- Dicellophilus carniolensis (Koch, 1847)

Synonyms
- Clinipodes carniolensis Koch, 1847; Geophilus apfelbecki Verhoeff, 1898; Geophilus austriacus Meinert, 1886; Mecistocephalus hungaricus Tömösváry,1880; Geophilus apfelbecki diversiporus Verhoeff, 1898

Species of centipede

Dicellophilus carniolensis is a species of soil centipede in the family Mecistocephalidae. This species is well known and found in central Europe. This centipede is the only species in the family Mecistocephilalidae known to live in the wild in Europe. This species features 43 pairs of legs, a number rarely observed in the family Mecistocephalidae and found in only one other genus in this family: In the genus Tygarrup, an undescribed species found in the Andaman Islands also has 43 leg pairs.

== Taxonomy ==
The German zoologist Carl L. Koch first described this species in 1847 based on type material found in Carniola in Slovenia. Koch originally described this species under the name Clinopodes carniolensis. The Italian zoologist Filippo Silvestri assigned this species to the genus Dicellophilus in 1919, and authorities have followed this assignment universally since the 1960s.

In 1880, the Hungarian zoologist Ödön Tömösváry described Mecistocephalus hungaricus as a new species. Since 1889, however, authorities have deemed M. hungaricus to be a junior synonym of D. cariolensis and have considered these centipedes to be the same species. Similarly, in 1886, the Danish zoologist Frederik Meinert described Geophilus austriacus as a new species, and in 1898, the German zoologist Karl W. Verhoeff described Geophilus apfelbecki as a new species, with Geophilus apfelbecki diversiporus as a subspecies. Since 1901, however, authorities have deemed G. austriacus, G. apfelbecki, and G. apfelbecki diversiporus to be junior synonyms of D. cariolensis and have considered all these centipedes to be the same species.

== Distribution ==
The species D. carniolensis has been recorded in hundreds of locations in mountainous regions and adjacent areas in Austria, Hungary, the Czech Republic, Slovakia, Poland, Romania, Slovenia, Italy, Croatia, and Bosnia-Herzegovina. In particular, this centipede has been found in the central and eastern Alps, the Dinarides, the Western, Eastern, and Southern Carpathians, and the Dobrogea region. On occasion, introduced specimens have also been recorded in Great Britain. This centipede has also been recorded in the Krasnodar territory of European Russia.

== Phylogeny ==
In 2010, a phylogenetic analysis of the genus Dicellophilus based on morphology placed D. carniolensis by itself on the most basal branch in a phylogenetic tree, with a sister group formed by all the other species in the genus in their own separate clade. Furthermore, in 2003, a cladistic analysis of the family Mecistocephalidae based on morphology placed the genus Dicellophilus in a clade with the genus Anarrup. Given that both species of Anarrup and most species of Dicellophilus have only 41 pairs of legs, this evidence suggests that D. carniolensis evolved from a common ancestor with 41 leg pairs, arriving at 43 leg pairs through a process that added two leg-bearing segments.

== Description ==
The species D. carniolensis has 43 pairs of legs and can reach 67 mm in length and 2.3 mm in width. The body ranges from brownish yellow to reddish, with the head and forcipules darker. Although no other species in the genus Dicellophilus features 43 leg pairs, the species D. carniolensis shares some distinctive traits with the other members of this genus. For example, in all species in this genus, each of the posterior lateral sclerites of the labrum features longitudinal folds and a concave posterior margin fringed with bristles. Furthermore, in all of these species, each of the ultimate legs features not only a ventral pore that is distinctly larger than all the other pores but also a tubercle at the distal end with a few small spines.

Other features, however, distinguish this species from all the other members of this genus. For example, D. carniolensis features 43 leg pairs, whereas the other species feature either 41 or 45 leg pairs. Furthermore, in the other species, the terminal article of the antennae is elongate, with a length/width ratio ranging from 2.1 to 2.5, whereas in D. carniolensis, this ratio ranges from 1.7 to 2.0. Moreover, in all the other species, the distal part of the medial projection from the first maxillae is evidently enlarged and subtriangular, but in D. carniolensis, this part is only slightly enlarged and not subtriangular.

== Reproduction ==
Like females of other species in the order Geophilomorpha, females of the species D. carniolensis care for their eggs for several weeks after laying them. In particular, the female coils around her brood to protect her eggs and recently hatched juveniles from predators and from mold. Unlike other females in this order, however, the female of the species D. carniolensis coils with her ventral surface in contact with her brood and her dorsal surface facing out. Females of genera in other families in this order, such as Geophilus, Strigamia, and Orphnaeus, coil around their brood with their ventral surfaces facing out. Females in the orders Scolopendromorpha and Craterostigmomorpha, like those of D. carniolensis, coil around their brood with their dorsal surfaces facing out.

Authorities suggest that centipedes switched from one position to the other upon evolving sternal glands and sternal pores, which are absent in females in the orders Scolopendromorpha and Craterostigmomorpha and the family Mecistocephalidae but usually present in other families in the order Geophilomorpha. Secretions from these glands may be noxious and repel predators, thereby providing chemical protection for the brood. According to this theory, females switched from mechanical protection with their dorsal surfaces facing out to chemical protection with their ventral surfaces facing out, and this switch was associated with the evolution of these sternal glands and pores. The female of another species in the family Mecistocephalidae, however, has been observed coiled around her hatchlings with her ventral surface facing out, contrary to the predictions of this theory.
