= Arrup asiaticus =

Scientific classification
- Kingdom: Animalia
- Phylum: Arthropoda
- Subphylum: Myriapoda
- Class: Chilopoda
- Order: Geophilomorpha
- Family: Mecistocephalidae
- Genus: Arrup
- Species: A. asiaticus

Binomial name
- Arrup asiaticus (Titova, 1975)

Synonyms
- Nodocephalus asiaticus Titova, 1975

Species of centipede

Arrup asiaticus is a species of soil centipede in the family Mecistocephalidae. This centipede is one of only two species of Arrup found in Central Asia. This centipede is also one of only five species in the family Mecistocephalidae found in Central Asia. This species features 41 pairs of legs in each sex and can reach 25 mm in length.

== Discovery ==
This species was first described in 1975 by the Russian myriapodologist Lidia P. Titova. She based the original description of this species on a large sample of specimens, including 11 males, 15 females, and 35 juveniles. Four specimens, including the male holotype, were found in 1966 in the Trans-Ili Alatau mountain range in Kazakhstan. Another four specimens were found in 1965 in Istaravshan in the Sughd Region of northern Tajikistan. The other specimens were found in 1970 in the Sary-Chelek Nature Reserve in Kyrgyzstan.

== Taxonomy ==
Titova originally described this species under the name Nodocephalus asiaticus. In 2003, the biologists Donatella Foddai, Lucio Bonato, Luis Alberto Pereira, and Alessandro Minelli moved this species into the genus Arrup. Authorities now consider Nodocephalus to be a junior synonym of Arrup.

== Description ==
This species features 41 leg-bearing segments and can reach 25 mm in length. The body is light yellow, but the head and forcipules are a darker brownish red. The dorsal surface of the head features no transverse frontal line. The areolate area on the anterior part of the clypeus is four to five times longer than the smooth areas on the posterior part of the clypeus (plagulae). A wide longitudinal areolate strip runs down the middle of the clypeus and separates the two plagulae. The coxosternite of the first maxillae and the coxosternite of the second maxillae are each undivided. Each of the second maxillae ends in a pair of setae instead of a claw.

The first article of the forcipule features a distal tooth that is large and dark, and the ultimate article features a sharp basal tooth, but the third article features only a tiny tubercle, and the second article features neither a tooth nor a tubercle. The sternites on the anterior trunk segments feature a longitudinal groove down the middle. The sternite on the last leg-bearing segment is shaped like a triangle that is twice as wide as long and rounded at the posterior end. The basal element of each of the ultimate legs can feature up to ten or eleven pores on the ventral and lateral surfaces. The ultimate legs lack claws, and the telson features anal pores.

This species exhibits many traits that characterize the genus Arrup. For example, this species features 41 leg pairs and an areolate stripe down the middle of the clypeus between two plagulae that do not extend to the lateral margins of the clypeus. Furthermore, as in other species in this genus, no spicula project from the pleurites on the sides of the head, both the coxosternite of the first maxillae and the coxosternite of the second maxillae are undivided, the sternites feature a longitudinal groove in the middle, and the first article of the forcipule features only a distal tooth.

This species shares a more extensive set of distinctive traits with the only other species of Arrup described from Central Asia, A. edentulus. For example, in each of these species, the distal tooth on the first article of the forcipule is large and dark, the ultimate article features a basal tooth, and the second article features neither a tooth nor a tubercle. Furthermore, in each of these species, the second maxillae lack claws, and the basal elements of the ultimate legs only feature pores on the ventral and lateral surfaces, not on the dorsal surfaces.

The species A. asiaticus can be distinguished from A. edentulus, however, based on other traits. For example, the areolate part of the clypeus is about four or five times longer than the plagulae in A. asiaticus but only about two or three times longer than the plagulae in A. edentulus. Furthermore, the areolate stripe between the plagulae is wide in A. asiaticus but narrow in A. edentulus. Moreover, the third article of the forcipule features a small tubercle in A. asiaticus but neither a tubercle nor a tooth in A. edentulus.

== Distribution ==
The species A. asiaticus is found in Kazakhstan, Kyrgyzstan, Tajikistan, and Uzbekistan. In Kazakhstan, this species has been recorded not only at the type locality in the Trans-Ili Alatau mountain range but also at other sites. These other sites in Kazakhstan include not only the Karatau mountain range and the Kazygurt District in the Turkistan Region but also the village of Kayrat in the Karasay District of the Almaty Region. In Kyrgyzstan, this species has been recorded in the Sary-Chelek Nature Reserve. In Tajikistan, this species has been recorded in the Sughd Region, not only in Istaravshan but also in the jamoat of Zumrad in Isfara. In Uzbekistan, this species has been recorded at multiple sites in the Tashkent Region, including the Ugam mountain range in the Bo'stonliq District and the Qurama mountain range in the Okhangaron District.

== Habitat and ecology ==
This species has been found in a variety of habitats. For example, this centipede was discovered in a field of wheat in Istaravshan in Tajikistan and in forests of Malus (apple) and Juglans (walnut) trees in Sary-Chelek in Kyrgyzstan. This centipede has also been found on peasant farms in the Karasay District in Kazakhstan, among trees and bushes in Zumrad in Tajikistan, and in soil samples from forests containing Juglans, Malus, and Pyrus (pear) trees in the Tashkent Region of Uzbekistan. This centipede has been found in the top 10 cm of soil in the Karatau mountains of Kazakhstan and in the Qurama mountains of Uzbekistan.
