= Rumoi River =

River in Hokkaidō, Japan

Rumoi River 留萌川
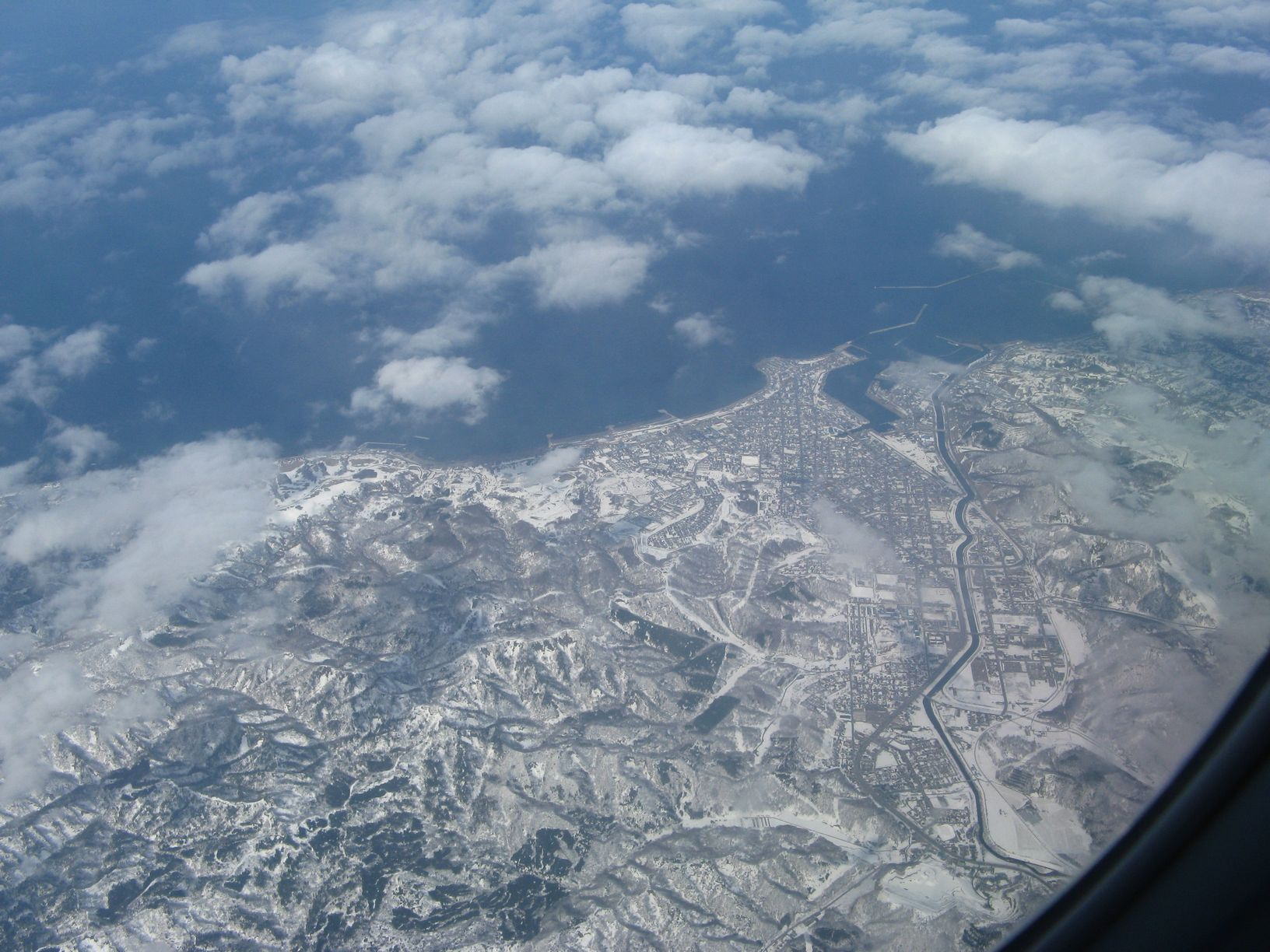
- Aerial view of the city of Rumoi, with the Rumoi River at right

- Location within Japan
- Native name: Rumoi-gawa (Japanese)

Location
- Country: Japan
- State: Hokkaidō
- Region: Rumoi
- District: Rumoi

Physical characteristics
- Source: Mount Poroshiri
  - location: Rumoi, Hokkaidō, Japan
  - coordinates: 43°57′46″N 141°50′10″E
  - elevation: 730.2 m (2,396 ft)
- Mouth: Sea of Japan
  - location: Rumoi, Hokkaidō, Japan
  - coordinates: 43°57′22″N 141°38′33″E
  - elevation: 0 m (0 ft)
- Length: 44 km (27 mi)
- Basin size: 270 km^{2} (100 sq mi)
- Discharge
  - average: 13.3 m^{3}/s (470 cu ft/s)

Rumoi River (留萌川, Rumoi-gawa) is a Class A river in Hokkaidō, Japan. The Rumoi is 44 kilometres (27 mi) in length. It traces its source to Mount Poroshiri 731 metres (2,398 ft) in the Hidaka Mountain range, and flows across Rumoi Subprefecture in the west of Hokkaidō and empties into the Sea of Japan. Its river mouth is in the city of Rumoi.
