= Proterotaiwanella =

Scientific classification
- Kingdom: Animalia
- Phylum: Arthropoda
- Subphylum: Myriapoda
- Class: Chilopoda
- Order: Geophilomorpha
- Family: Mecistocephalidae
- Genus: Proterotaiwanella; Bonato, Foddai & Minelli, 2002

Type species
- Proterotaiwanella tanabei Bonato, Foddai & Minelli, 2002

Species
- Proterotaiwanella sculptulata; Proterotaiwanella tanabei

Genus of Mecistocephalidae centipedes

Proterotaiwanella is a genus of centipedes in the family Mecistocephalidae. This genus includes only two species, the type species P. tanabei and the species P. sculptulata. The species P. sculptulata features 49 pairs of legs and is found in Taiwan, whereas the species P. tanabei features 45 leg pairs and is found in the Ryukyu Islands of Japan.

== Discovery and taxonomy ==
The species P. sculptulata was first described in 1936 by Japanese myriapodologist Yosioki Takakuwa based on syntypes found in Xizhou and Xihu, both in the county of Changhua in Taiwan. These syntypes were probably lost during World War II. Takakuwa described this species under the name Taiwanella sculptulata, proposing a new genus, Taiwanella, to contain this species along with another new species that he described simultaneously.

In 2002, the biologists Lucio Bonato, Donatella Foddai, and Alessandro Minelli described the species P. tanabei based on a female holotype. They named this species after the Japanese myriapodologist Tsutomu Tanabe, who found this specimen in 1992 on Kume Island in Okinawa Prefecture in Japan. The holotype is deposited in the National Museum of Nature and Science in Tokyo.

Bonato, Foddai, and Minelli also proposed a new genus, Proterotaiwanella, to contain the new species P. tanabei, which they designated as the type species. They also moved P. sculptulata from the genus Taiwanella to the new genus Proterotaiwanella, deeming Taiwanella to be an invalid name. They named the new genus Proterotaiwanella, however, to suggest some continuity with the genus proposed by Takakuwa.

== Phylogeny ==
In 2003, a cladistic analysis of the family Mecistocephalidae based on morphology placed the genus Proterotaiwanella in the subfamily Dicellophilinae along with the genera Anarrup and Dicellophilus. This analysis placed these three genera together in the same clade, with Proterotaiwanella on the most basal branch of this clade in a phylogenetic tree of the family Mecistocephilalidae. Thus, according to this analysis, the genera Anarrup and Dicellophilus form a sister group for the genus Proterotaiwanella.

In 2024, however, a phylogenetic analysis of several genera in the family Mecistocephiladae based on molecular data instead placed the genus Proterotaiwanella in a clade along with the genera Mecistocephalus and Tygarrup, two genera in the subfamily Mecistocephalinae. This analysis placed the genus Proterotaiwanella on the most basal branch of this clade in a phylogenetic tree of the family Mecistocephalidae. This molecular evidence suggests that Proterotaiwanella is most closely related to a sister group including the genera Mecistocephalus and Tygarrup and less closely related to the genus Dicellophilus.

== Description ==
Centipedes in the genus Proterotaiwanella have either 45 or 49 leg-bearing segments and range from 21 mm to 30 mm in length. These centipedes have yellow bodies without dark patches, but the head and forcipular segment are darker. The dorsal plate on the head is elongate, with a length/width ratio ranging from 1.6 to 1.7. The anterior part of the clypeus features uniform areolation, and the two smooth areas on the posterior part (plagulae) are separated by a longitudinal areolate stripe down the middle. The plagulae do not extend along the lateral margins of the clypeus. The areolate part of the clypeus features sensilla shaped like buttons. The pleurites on the sides of the head (buccae) feature neither setae nor spicula. The anterior sclerites of the side pieces of the labrum (anterior alae) are triangular, with their inner margins adjacent to the middle piece reduced to a point. The posterior margin of the labrum features a row of notches or projections shaped like fingers.

The coxosternite of the first maxillae is divided down the middle by a longitudinal suture, but the coxosternite of the second maxillae is undivided. The second maxillae are slender and poorly developed, do not reach beyond the first maxillae, and end in a rudimentary claw. The tergum of the forcipular segment is only slightly wider than long and features a distinct longitudinal groove in the middle. The first article of the forcipule features a distal tooth, and the third article features a tooth, but the second article does not. The sternites of the trunk segments lack pores but feature a groove that is not forked. The ultimate legs are notably swollen, longer than the other legs, and each end in a tubercle with a few short spines.

This genus exhibits many traits that characterize the subfamily Dicellophilinae. For example, like the other two genera placed in this subfamily, Anarrup and Dicellophilus, the genus Proterotaiwanella features a spinous tubercle at the distal end of each of the ultimate legs. Furthermore, these three genera feature a trunk without dark patches, a head evidently longer than wide, buccae without spicula, anterior alae with the inner margin reduced to a point, and a divided coxosternite of the first maxillae. Moreover, in these genera, the forcipular tergum is slightly wider than long and features a longitudinal groove in the middle, the first article of the forcipule features only a distal tooth, and the groove on the sternites is not forked.

Centipedes in the genus Proterotaiwanella can be distinguished from those in the genera Anarrup and Dicellophilus, however, based on other traits. For example, the second maxillae are short and do not reach beyond the first maxillae in Proterotaiwanella but reach distinctly beyond the first maxillae in Anarrup and Dicellophilus. Furthermore, the clypeus is areolate in the center, along the lateral margins, and in a longitudinal strip down the middle of the posterior part in Proterotaiwanella but not in Anarrup or Dicellophilus. Moreover, the lateral corners at the front of the clypeus feature setae in Anarrup and Dicellophilus but not in Proterotaiwanella, and the posterior alae feature longitudinal folds in Anarrup and Dicellophilus but instead feature distinctive marginal notches in Proterotaiwanella.

The genus Proterotaiwanella also exhibits many traits that characterize the subfamily Mecistocephalinae. For example, like the genera Mecistocephalus and Tygarrup, the genus Proterotaiwanella features a head evidently longer than wide, posterior alae without longitudinal stripes, a divided coxosternite of the first maxillae, an undivided coxosternite of the second maxillae, and a reduced claw at the end of each of the second maxillae. Furthermore, in these genera, the forcipular tergum is slightly wider than long and features a longitudinal groove in the middle, and the sternites feature a longitudinal groove in the middle.

Centipedes in the genus Proterotaiwanella can be distinguished from those in the genera Mecistocephalus and Tygarrup, however, based on other traits. For example, the second maxillae do not reach beyond the first maxillae in Proterotaiwanella but reach distinctly beyond the first maxillae in Mecistocephalus and Tygarrup. Furthermore, each of the ultimate legs ends in a spinous tubercle in Proterotaiwanella but not in Mecistocephalus or Tygarrup. Moreover, the posterior alae feature marginal notches in Proterotaiwanella but not in Mecistocephalus or Tygrarrup.

The two species of Proterotaiwanella can be distinguished from one another based on other traits. For example, P. sculptulata features 49 leg pairs, whereas P. tanabei features only 45 pairs. Furthermore, the ultimate article of the forcipule features a shallow obtuse basal tooth in P. tanabei but features no tooth in P. sculptulata.
