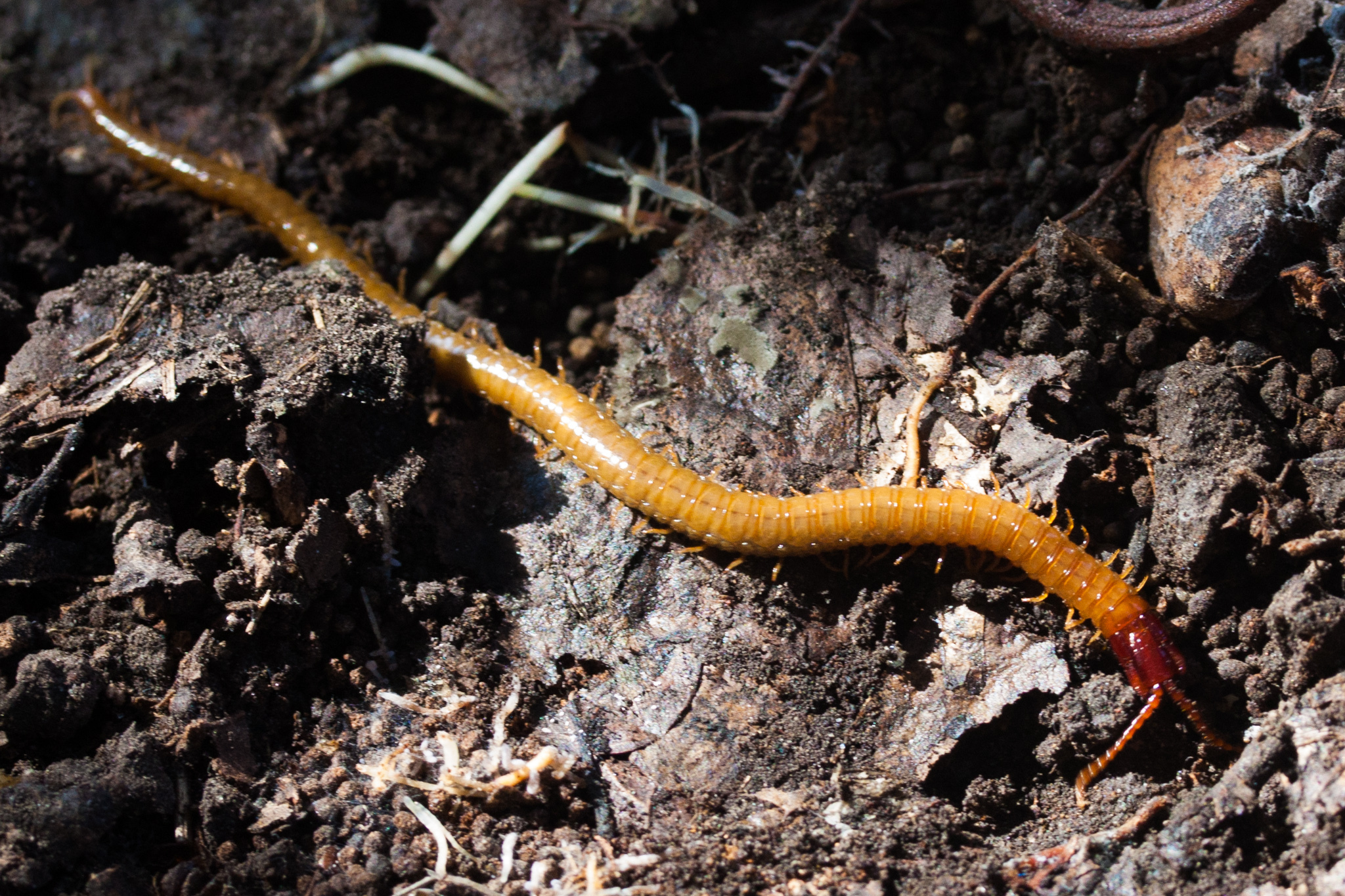

Scientific classification
- Kingdom: Animalia
- Phylum: Arthropoda
- Subphylum: Myriapoda
- Class: Chilopoda
- Order: Geophilomorpha
- Family: Mecistocephalidae
- Genus: Dicellophilus
- Species: D. limatus

Binomial name
- Dicellophilus limatus (Wood, 1862)

Synonyms
- Mecistocephalus limatus Wood, 1862; Mecistocephalus breviceps Meinert, 1886

= Dicellophilus limatus =

Species of centipede

Dicellophilus limatus is a species of soil centipede in the family Mecistocephalidae. This centipede is the type species for the genus Dicellophilus. This species features 45 pairs of legs, the maximum number observed in this genus, and can reach 60 mm or more in length. This species is found in California. This centipede is one of only four species in the family Mecistocephiladae found in North America.

== Discovery and taxonomy ==
This species was first described in 1862 by the American biologist Horatio C. Wood Jr., based on three syntypes found in California. These syntypes were originally deposited in the Smithsonian Institution in Washington, D.C., but these specimens may now be lost. Wood originally described this species under the name Mecistocephalus limatus. In 1896, the American biologist Orator F. Cook proposed the genus Dicellophilus to contain this species, which he explicitly designated as the type species. Authorities have agreed on the placement of this species in the genus Dicellophilus since at least the 1950s.

In 1886, the Danish zoologist Frederik V. A. Meinert described Mecistocephalus breviceps as a new species. He based the original description of this centipede on two specimens, including a male holotype, which is deposited in the Museum of Comparative Zoology at Harvard University. In 1920, the American biologist Ralph V. Chamberlin deemed M. breviceps to be a junior synonym of D. limatus. Since then, authorities have considered D. limatus to be the valid name for the centipede described as M. breviceps.

== Phylogeny ==
In 2010, a phylogenetic analysis of the genus Dicellophilus based on morphology confirmed the monophyly of the genus and placed D. limatus in a clade with another species in the same genus, D. anomalus. The species D. anomalus features 41 pairs of legs and is also found on the west coast of the United States. This analysis found that these two North American species form a sister group for the species D. pulcher, which emerged as the next closest relative in a phylogenetic tree of this genus. The species D. pulcher is found in Japan and features 41 leg pairs.

In 2003, a cladistic analysis of the family Mecistocephalidae based on morphology placed the genus Dicellophilus in a clade with the genus Anarrup. Given that both species of Anarrup and most species of Dicellophilus have only 41 pairs of legs, this evidence suggests that Dicellophilus evolved from a common ancestor with 41 leg pairs. This evidence indicates that D. limatus arrived at 45 leg pairs through a process that added four leg-bearing segments.

== Description ==
The species D. limatus features 45 leg pairs in each sex and can reach 60 mm or more in length and nearly 3 mm in width. The body ranges from yellow to orange-red, with the head and antennae ranging from dark red to chestnut brown. The tergites on the anterior half of the body often feature a narrow darker border on the posterior margin.

Although no other species in the genus Dicellophilus features 45 leg pairs, the species D. limatus shares some distinctive traits with the other members of this genus. For example, as in all species in this genus, each of the posterior lateral sclerites of the labrum features longitudinal folds and a concave posterior margin fringed with bristles. Furthermore, as in all of these species, each of the ultimate legs features not only a ventral pore that is distinctly larger than all the other pores but also a tubercle at the distal end with a few small spines.

The species D. limatus shares a more extensive set of distinctive traits with its close relatives, D. anomalus and D. pulcher. For example, in all three of these species, the terminal article of each of the antennae is elongate, with a length/width ratio ranging from 2.2 to 2.4. Furthermore, in all three species, the distal parts of the coxal projections from the first maxillae are evidently enlarged and subtriangular.

The species D. limatus shares an especially extensive set of distinctive traits with its closest relative, D. anomalus. For example, both D. limatus and D. anomalus feature antennae with elongate setae reaching 300 microns in length, whereas these setae range from 150 to 200 microns in length in D. pulcher. Furthermore, the transverse frontal line on the dorsal surface of the head forms an obvious angle pointing forward in the middle in both D. limatus and D. anomalus but is uniformly rounded in D. pulcher. Moreover, both D. limatus and D. anomalus feature a distinctly isolated pair of setae in the middle of the posterior part of the clypeus, but these setae are absent in D. pulcher.

The species D. limatus can be distinguished from its close relative D. anomalus, however, based on other traits. For example, the species D. limatus features 45 leg pairs, whereas D. anomalus features only 41 leg pairs. Furthermore, the telopodites of the first maxillae are elongate in D. anomalus, more than four times as long as their maximum width, whereas this length/width ratio falls within the range of 3.0 to 3.8 in D. limatus. Moreover, the posterior margin of the sternum of the last leg-bearing segment is a regular convex curve in D. limatus, whereas a short process shaped like a pillow projects from the posterior end of this sternum in D. anomalus.

== Distribution ==
The natural distribution of the species D. limatus is limited to a narrow area along the Pacific Coast Ranges in central and southern California. In particular, this centipede is found around San Francisco Bay and near Los Angeles. This species has been recorded in Sonoma, Mill Valley, Sausalito, Berkeley, Stanford, and Claremont. Although this centipede has also been recorded elsewhere, on Nantucket island in Massachusetts, near Nashville, Tennessee, and at Chapman Field in Miami, Florida, authorities express some doubts about these records and find no persuasive evidence that this species actually lives outside of California.
