= Takashimaia =

Scientific classification
- Kingdom: Animalia
- Phylum: Arthropoda
- Subphylum: Myriapoda
- Class: Chilopoda
- Order: Geophilomorpha
- Family: Mecistocephalidae
- Genus: Takashimaia; Miyosi, 1955
- Species: T. ramungula

Binomial name
- Takashimaia ramungula Miyosi, 1955

Genus of centipede

Takashimaia is a monotypic genus of soil centipede in the family Mecistocephilidae. The only species in this genus is Takashimaia ramungula. This centipede is found in Japan, features 45 pairs of legs without intraspecific variation, and can reach 50 mm in length.

== Taxonomy and phylogeny ==
In 1955, the Japanese zoologist Yasunori Miyosi not only described the species T. ramungula but also proposed the genus Takashimaia to contain the newly discovered species. He based the original description of this species on a female holotype found in 1951 in the Sagaramine mountains in Ehima Prefecture on the island of Shikoku in Japan. In 2003, the biologists Donatella Foddai, Lucio Bonato, Luis Alberto Pereira, and Alessandro Minelli placed the genus Takashimaia in the subfamily Mecistocephalinae, along with the genera Krateraspis, Mecistocephalus, and Tygarrup, based on similarities in morphology among these four genera. Phylogenetic analysis based on morphology places the genera Takashimaia and Mecistocephalus together in a clade as sister groups, with Tygarrup by itself on the most basal branch of this subfamily in a phylogenetic tree of the family Mecistocephalidae.

== Description ==
The species T. ramungula features 45 leg-bearing segments. Adults of this species range from 15 to 50 mm in length. The body is yellow without dark patches, but the head and forcipular segment are darker. The head ranges from 1.3 to 1.8 time longer than wide, and the antennae range from 2.9 to 4.3 times as long as the width of the head. The dorsal surface of the head features a rounded transverse frontal line. A single smooth area (plagula) covers most of the clypeus, with no longitudinal areolate stripe down the middle. The pleurites on the sides of the head (buccae) feature a spiculum on each side but no setae. The anterior sclerites of the side pieces of the labrum are triangular, with the margin adjacent to the middle piece reduced to a vertex. The mandible features about six or seven lamellae, with four or five teeth on the first lamella and eleven or twelve teeth on the average intermediate lamella.

The coxosternite of the first maxillae is divided down the middle by a longitudinal suture, but the coxosternite of the second maxillae is undivided. The second maxillae each end in a sharp pointed claw. The forcipular tergum is only slightly wider than long and features a distinct longitudinal groove in the middle. The first and third articles of the forcipule each feature a tooth, but the second article features either a small tubercle or no tooth at all. No basal tooth is present on the ultimate article of the forcipule, but this article features a more distal tooth that is well developed. The sternites of the trunk segments feature a groove that is not forked. The sternite of the last leg-bearing segment is shaped like a trapezoid. The ultimate legs are as slender in the males and in the females.

This centipede exhibits many traits that characterize the subfamily Mecistocephalinae. For example, like other genera in this subfamily, the genus Takashimaia features not only a head that is evidently longer than wide but also a clypeus with smooth areas covering more than the posterior half. Furthermore, like other genera in this subfamily, this genus also features a divided coxosternite of the first maxillae, an undivided coxosternite of the second maxillae, a claw at the end of each of the second maxillae, a forcipular tergum that is only slightly wider than long, and a longitudinal groove down the middle of the trunk sternites.

The genus Takashimaia shares a more distinctive set of traits with its close relatives in the genus Mecistocephalus. For example, unlike the other genera in the subfamily Mecistocephalinae, the genera Takashimaia and Mecistocephalus feature a spiculum that projects from each side of the head. Furthermore, in both of these genera, the forcipular tergum features a distinct longitudinal groove in the middle.

These two closely related genera can be distinguished, however, based on other traits. For example, the clypeus is areolate in the center and features an areolate longitudinal stripe down the middle of the posterior part in Mecistocephalus but not in Takashimaia. Furthermore, the buccae feature setae in Mecistocephalus but not in Takashimaia. Moreover, the inner margins of the anterior sclerites of the side pieces of the labrum are reduced to points in Takashimaia but not in Mecistocephalus.

== Distribution ==
The species T. ramungula is found in Japan, not only on the islands of Honshu, Shikoku, and Kyushu but also on the Ryukyu Islands. On or near the island of Honshu, this species has been recorded not only in Tateyama and Amatsukominato in Chiba Prefecture but also on the island of Miyake-jima in the Izu Islands in Tokyo Prefecture. On the island of Shikoku, this species has been recorded in Ehime prefecture, not only at the type locality in the Sagaramine mountains but also in Omogo, in Odamiyama, and on Mount Ishizuchi. On the island of Kyushu, this species has been recorded on Cape Sata and in the district of Kimotsuki, both in Kagoshima Prefecture. In the Ryukyu Islands, this species has been recorded on the islands of Tanegashima, Yakushima, and Okinawa.
