= Arrup dentatus =

Scientific classification
- Kingdom: Animalia
- Phylum: Arthropoda
- Subphylum: Myriapoda
- Class: Chilopoda
- Order: Geophilomorpha
- Family: Mecistocephalidae
- Genus: Arrup
- Species: A. dentatus

Binomial name
- Arrup dentatus (Takakuwa, 1934)

Synonyms
- Prolamnonyx dentatus Takakuwa, 1934

Species of centipede

Arrup dentatus is a species of soil centipede in the family Mecistocephalidae. This centipede is found on the island of Hokkaido in Japan as well as in Russia. This centipede is one of only two species in the family Mecistocephalidae known from Hokkaido and the only species of Arrup known from this island. This species features 41 pairs of legs and can reach 21 mm in length.

== Discovery and taxonomy ==
This species was first described in 1934 by the Japanese myriapodologist Yosioki Takakuwa. He based the original description of this species on specimens found near Sapporo on the island of Hokkaido in Japan. He originally described this species under the name Prolamnonyx dentatus. In 1964, the American myriapodologist Ralph E. Crabill Jr., of the Smithsonian Institution in Washington, D.C., deemed Prolamnonyx to be a junior synonym of Arrup and moved the species described as P. dentatus into the genus Arrup.

== Phylogeny ==
This species departs from other species of Arrup in some aspects of morphology, suggesting that A. dentatus is only distantly related to other species in the same genus. Nevertheless, a cladistic analysis of the family Mecistocephalidae based on morphology places the species A. dentatus in a clade with another species of Arrup found in California, A. pylorus. This analysis also places a Japanese species from the same genus, A. holstii, on a more basal branch of a phylogenetic tree of the family Mecistocephalidae. Thus, similarities in morphology suggest that the species A. dentatus and A. pylorus are more closely related to one another than to other species of Arrup.

== Description ==
The species A. dentatus features 41 leg-bearing segments and can reach at least 21 mm in length. The body is yellow without any dark patches, but the head is chestnut brown. The transverse frontal line on the dorsal surface of the head is uniformly curved. The telopodite of the second maxillae features a stout claw at the distal end in at least some Japanese specimens assigned to this species, but this claw is absent in Russian specimens that are otherwise similar. The areolate part of the clypeus is between 2.0 and 2.5 times longer than the smooth areas in the posterior part of the clypeus (plagulae). The sternum of the last leg-bearing segment in this species is wider than long. The ultimate legs are slender in the females of this species but swollen in the males.

The first article of the forcipule in this species features a well developed distal tooth, the third article features a well developed tooth, and the ultimate article features an obtuse basal tooth. The poison calyx in the forcipule reaches only the distal end of the first article of the forcipule in both sexes. The well developed tooth on the third article of the forcipule, along with the relatively short poison calyx without any sexual dimorphism, distinguish this species from other species of Arrup. Other species in this genus usually feature only a small tubercle on the third article of the forcipule, and in the males of some other species in this genus, the poison calyx is elongated.

Nevertheless, this species exhibits many traits that characterize the genus Arrup. For example, this species features 41 leg pairs, an areolate stripe down the middle of the clypeus, and a coxosternite of the first maxillae that is not divided down the middle by a longitudinal suture. Furthermore, as in other species in this genus, the anterior part of the tergum of the forcipular segment features no furrow in the middle, the first article of the forcipule features one distal tooth but no proximal tooth, and the furrow down the middle of the sternum of the leg-bearing segments is not forked.

This species shares a more extensive set of traits with the species A. pylorus. For example, these two species are similar in size, and in each species, the poison calyx in the forcipule is relatively short, the ultimate article of the forcipule features an obtuse basal tooth, and the sternum of the last leg-bearing segment is wider than long. Furthermore, in these species, the head features a frontal line that is uniformly curved, the pleurites on the sides of the head feature no setae, the mandible in the average adult features only four or five fully developed pectinate lamellae, and the basal element of each of the ultimate legs features pores on the ventral and lateral surfaces but not on the dorsal surface. Moreover, in these species, the plagulae are from one-quarter to one-third the length of the entire clypeus.

The species A. dentatus can be distinguished from A. pylorus, however, based on other traits. For example, the third article of the forcipule features a well developed tooth in A. dentatus but not in A. pylorus. Furthermore, the poison calyx in the forcipule is exceptionally short in A. pylorus, reaching only the intermediate articles, whereas this channel reaches the distal end of the first article in A. dentatus. Moreover, the coxosternite of the first maxillae is wider relative to its length in A. dentatus: The maximum width of this coxosternite is more than three times its length in A. dentatus but less than three times its length in A. pylorus.

== Distribution ==
The species A. dentatus is found not only on the island of Hokkaido in Japan but also in the Russian Far East. On the island of Hokkaido, this centipede has been recorded not only at the type locality near Sapporo but also in Wakkanai, in Engaru in the Monbetsu District, in Niseko in the Abuta District, at the foot of Mount Poroshiri, and at Mount Soranuma. In the Russian Far East, this centipede is found in the Maritime Territory (Primorsky Krai) and in Sakhalin Oblast. In Primorsky Krai, this species has been recorded in the Lazovsky Nature Reserve on the southeastern slopes of the Sikhote-Alin mountains. In Sakhalin Oblast, this species has been recorded at the southern end of the island of Sakhalin and on the disputed islands of Kunashir and Shikotan in the Kuril Islands.
