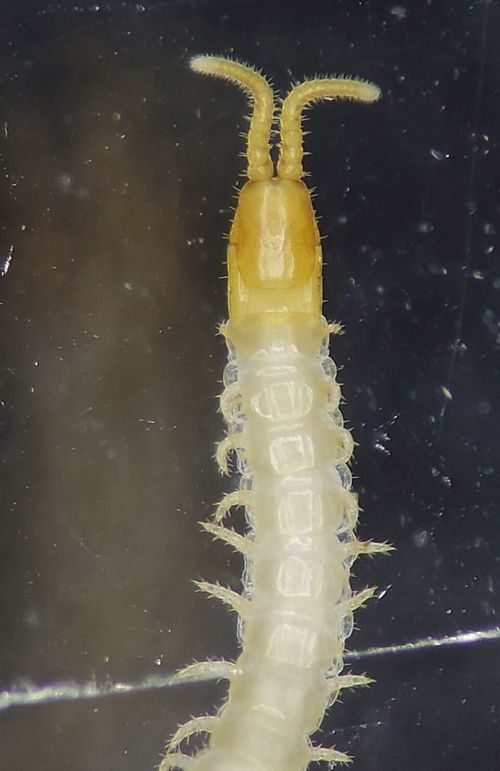
- Nannarrup hoffmani

Scientific classification
- Kingdom: Animalia
- Phylum: Arthropoda
- Subphylum: Myriapoda
- Class: Chilopoda
- Order: Geophilomorpha
- Family: Mecistocephalidae
- Genus: Nannarrup; Foddai, Bonato, Pereira & Minelli, 2003

Type species
- Nannarrup hoffmani Foddai, Bonato, Pereira & Minelli, 2003

Species
- Nannarrup hoffmani; Nannarrup innuptus; Nannarrup oyamensis

= Nannarrup =

Genus of centipedes

Nannarrup is a genus of soil centipedes in the family Mecistocephalidae. This genus contains only three species, including the type species Nannarrup hoffmani. Also known as Hoffman's dwarf centipede, N. hoffmani was discovered in Central Park in New York City and was the first new species to be discovered in that park in more than a century. This genus includes the smallest species in the family Mecistocephalidae, with adults measuring about 10 mm in length. Centipedes in this genus have only 41 pairs of legs, the minimum number recorded in this family.

== Discovery ==
This genus and its type species N. hoffmani were first described in 2003 by the biologists Donatella Foddai, Lucio Bonato, Luis Alberto Pereira, and Alessandro Minelli. They based the original description of this species on ten specimens, including an adult female holotype collected in April 1998 from leaf litter in the North Woods of Central Park. These specimens also include nine paratypes (eight juveniles, including one male, and fragments of another specimen) collected in September 1998 from leaf litter in the Ramble in Central Park. The holotype and eight of the paratypes are deposited in the American Museum of Natural History in New York.

These specimens were collected by a team of researchers led by Liz Johnson and Kefyn Catley of the American Museum of Natural History. This team collected samples of leaf litter from Central Park to conduct research on the health of the park's ecosystem for the Central Park Conservancy, hoping to learn how to best preserve this ecosystem. The team searched through twigs, fungi, and decaying leaves mixed with soil to collect specimens for identification by taxonomists. These researchers sent a collection of their myriapod specimens to the American entomologist Richard L. Hoffman, who was then the curator of invertebrates at the Virginia Museum of Natural History, for identification. Hoffman could not identify some of these specimens and passed them on biologists in Italy who specialize in myriapods.

These biologist recognized the newly discovered centipede as representing not only a new species but also a species so distinctive as to merit placement in a new genus. The genus name Nannarrup derives from the Greek word nannos, meaning dwarf (a reference to the small size of the newly discovered centipede), and Arrup, the name of a previously described genus that resembles the new centipede. The name of the species honors Hoffman, who forwarded the specimens on which the original description of this species is based.

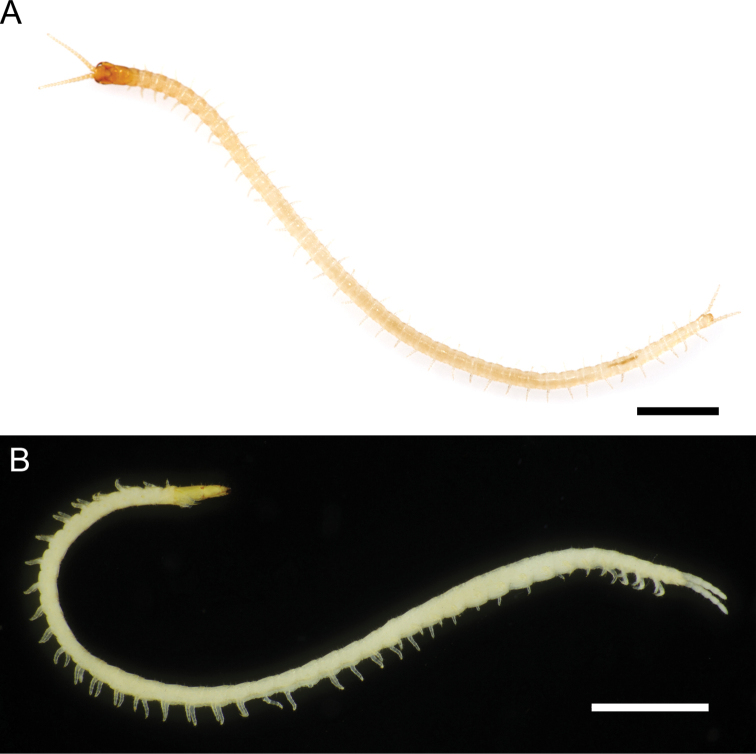
Nannarrup innuptus intact (A) and with head capsule detached (B)

In 2022, Japanese biologists Sho Tsukamoto, Satoshi Shimano, and Katsuyuki Eguchi described two more species in this genus, N. innuptus and N. oyamensis. They based the original descriptions of these species on 88 specimens collected in different seasons from 2017 to 2022. These specimens were found in a broad range of localities on the islands of Honshu, Shikoku, and Kyushu in Japan.

The original description of N. innuptus is based on a large sample including 71 females and 11 juveniles but no specimens determined to be males. The species name N. innuptus derives from the word for unmarried in Latin and refers to the absence of males in the large sample of specimens collected, which suggests the possibility of reproduction by parthenogenesis. The type specimens includes a female holotype and nine female paratypes. The holotype and four paratypes are deposited at the National Museum of Nature and Science in Tokyo; five paratypes are deposited at the Museum of Nature and Human Activities in Hyogo Prefecture in Japan.

The original description of N. oyamensis is based on a male holotype and a male paratype, both collected in 2021 from Mount Oyama in Kanagawa Prefecture in Japan. The species name refers to the type locality. The holotype is deposited at National Museum of Nature and Science in Tokyo; the paratype is deposited at the Museum of Nature and Human Activities in Hyogo Prefecture in Japan.

== Phylogeny and taxonomy ==
In 2003, a cladistic analysis of the family Mecistocephalidae using morphological features placed the genus Nannarrup in the subfamily Arrupinae, along with the genera Arrup, Agnostrup, and Partygarrupius. Further cladistic analysis of the subfamily Arrupinae based on external morphology placed the genus Nannarrup in a clade with Arrup as a closely related sister group. This analysis also placed this clade inside another clade with Agnostrup as a sister group in the same branch of a phylogenetic tree.

In 2024, however, a phylogenetic analysis based on molecular data placed Nannarrup in a clade with Agnostrup as a closely related sister group. This analysis placed Arrup by itself on the most basal branch in a phylogenetic tree of the family Mecistocephilidae. This study found so little genetic distance between Nannarrup and Agnostrup that the authors suggest that the morphological differences between these two genera are too minor to justify their separation into distinct genera. These authors propose moving the three species of Nannarrup into the genus Agnostrup. Nevertheless, other references list Nannarrup as a valid genus.

== Geographic origin ==
Although the species N. hoffmani was discovered in New York City, biologists believe that humans introduced this species from elsewhere. The type specimens were discovered along with two other species known to be introduced. Furthermore, New York lies far from the distribution range of any other species in the family Mecistocephiladae. There are only three other species from this family found in North America, all of them in California, and only one of these, Arrup pylorus, is in the subfamily Arrupinae. The three species of Agnostrup, the closest relatives of Nannarrup, are found in China, Japan, and the Sikhote-Alin mountains in southeastern Russia. These distributions suggest East Asia and California as the leading candidates for the geographic origin of N. hoffmani. The most likely scenario is that humans transported N. hoffmani in potting soil when they imported exotic plants from East Asia for planting in Central Park. This theory gained support in 2022 with the description of two Nannarrup species in Japan, suggesting that this genus is native to East Asia.

After introduction to New York City, N. hoffmani established a breeding population in Central Park, as indicated by specimens that not only include juveniles as well as adults but also were collected in different seasons. Furthermore, the female holotype contained sperm, indicating that the species is reproducing in Central Park. The survival of this introduced species in such a foreign urban environment is especially striking given the population density of New York City and the flow of visitors to Central Park.

== Description ==
All three Nannarrup species are notable for their small sizes. For example, the N. hoffmani holotype measures 10.3 mm in length, and the N. oyamensis holotype measures only 8.6 mm in length. Specimens of N. innuptus range from 7.0 mm to 12.0 mm in length. All Nannarrup species feature 41 pairs of legs. In all three species, the body is a pale yellow, but the head and forcipular segment is a pale ochre.

The head in this genus is slightly longer than wide and features no transverse suture on the front of the dorsal surface. The pleurites on the side of the head lack setae. The coxosternite of the first maxillae is divided down the middle, but the coxosternite of the second maxillae is undivided. The claw of the second maxillae is reduced to a terminal spine. When closed, the forcipules remain far behind the front of the head. The first article of the forcipule features a single distal denticle that is pigmented, but the second article features no denticle. The ultimate article of the forcipule features a well developed basal denticle. The forcipular tergum features no furrow down the middle. The furrow on the sternites is not forked. The ventral surface of the basal element of each of the ultimate legs features numerous pores, and the telson features anal pores.

This genus shares many distinctive features with its close relatives in the genus Agnostrup. For example, all the species in both of these genera feature 41 leg pairs. Furthermore, in both genera, the first article of the forcipule features a single well developed distal tooth pointing forward, and the ultimate article features a well developed basal tooth.

The species in the genus Nannarrup can be distinguished from their close relatives in the genus Agnostrup, however, based on other traits. For example, the dorsal surface of the head features a transverse frontal line in Agnostrup but not in Nannarrup. Furthermore the clypeus in Nannarrup is largely areolate, with the smooth areas in the posterior part of the clypeus (plagulae) limited to about one-sixth of the clypeus, whereas the plagulae ranges from about one-half to most of the clypeus in Agnostrup. Moreover, the setae on the clypeus are limited to the areolate part of the clypeus in Nannarrup but extend to the plagulae in Agnostrup.

The species N. hoffmani can be distinguished from the other two species in the same genus based on features of the denticles on the forcipules. For example, the denticle on the first article is twice as wide as long in N. hoffmani but longer than wide in the other two species, which each feature length/width ratios of at least 1.3. Furthermore, this denticle features more pigment than the denticle on the ultimate article in N. hoffmani, whereas these two denticles are equally pigmented in the other two species.

The species N. oyamensis can be distinguished from the other two species in the same genus based on the features of the clypeus. Both N. hoffmani and N. innuptus feature a pair of smooth areas on the clypeus, one on the posterior part of each of the lateral margins, but these smooth areas are absent in N. oyamensis. Thus, N. innuptus can also be distinguished from each of the other two species based on features of either the clypeus or the forcipules.
