= Arrup kyushuensis =

Scientific classification
- Kingdom: Animalia
- Phylum: Arthropoda
- Subphylum: Myriapoda
- Class: Chilopoda
- Order: Geophilomorpha
- Family: Mecistocephalidae
- Genus: Arrup
- Species: A. kyushuensis

Binomial name
- Arrup kyushuensis Uliana, Bonato & Minelli, 2007

Species of centipede

Arrup kyushuensis is a species of soil centipede in the family Mecistocephalidae. This centipede is found in Japan. This species features 41 pairs of legs without intraspecific variation and can reach 28 mm in length.

== Discovery ==
This species was first described in 2007 by the Italian biologists Marco Uliana, Lucio Bonato, and Alessandro Minelli based on a male holotype and a female paratype found in 1985 in Shimabara in Nagasaki Prefecture on the island of Kyushu in Japan. The species name refers to the type locality. These biologists also examined 21 other specimens, including not only adults but also juveniles. The male holotype is deposited in the National Museum of Nature and Science in Tokyo.

== Description ==
This species features 41 leg-bearing segments in each sex. Adults can range from 17 mm to 28 mm in length. The body is yellow without dark patches. The head is 1.4 to 1.5 times longer than wide and features a curved transverse frontal line on the dorsal surface. The antennae are 2.7 to 3.2 times longer than the head is wide. The areolate part of the clypeus is 2.4 to 3.2 times longer than the smooth areas in the posterior part (plagulae). The posterior margin of each side piece of the labrum is slightly concave in the middle but convex at each end. The distal lobe of each coxal projection of the first maxillae features parallel margins and is only slightly swollen at the tip. The distal end of each of the second maxillae features three or four small tubercles instead of a claw.

The first article of the forcipule features a large distal tooth, shaped like a triangle and conspicuously projecting out. The third article of the forcipule features a distinct tubercle, and the ultimate article features a basal tooth that is sharp and well developed, but the second article is smooth. The poison calyx inside the forcipule can almost reach the posterior end of the forcipular sternum in at least some males, but this channel reaches only the distal part of the first article in females. The sternum of the last leg-bearing segment is shaped like a triangle that is as long as wide. Each of the ultimate legs features a very small spine at the distal end.

This species exhibits many traits that characterize the genus Arrup. For example, this species features 41 leg pairs, an areolate stripe down the middle of the clypeus, no spicula on the sides of the head, and one distal tooth on the first article of the forcipule. Furthermore, the coxosternite of the first maxillae is not divided down the middle by a longitudinal suture, the forcipular tergum is distinctly wider than long and features no longitudinal groove in the middle, and the furrow down the middle of the sternum of the leg-bearing segments is not forked.

This species shares a more extensive set of distinctive traits with another species in the same genus, A. holstii, which is also found in Japan. For example, in each of these two species, adults are between 15 mm and 30 mm long, a frontal line is evident on the head, the basal part of each of the coxal projections of the first maxillae is less than three times as long as the distal lobe, the second maxillae lack claws, and the sternum of the last leg-bearing segment is as long as wide. Furthermore, in both species, the forcipule features a tooth on the first article that tapers to a point, only a small tubercle on the third article, and a sharp tooth on the ultimate article.

The species A. kyushuensis can be distinguished from A. holstii, however, based on other traits. For example, the tooth on the first article of the forcipule is small and points forward in A. holstii but is large and triangular and projects out in A. kyushuensis. Furthermore, the distal lobe of each of the coxal projections of the first maxillae is distinctly swollen at the tip (clavate) in A. holstii but only slightly clavate in A. kyushuensis. Moreover, the areolate part of the clypeus is larger in A. holstii, about four to five times longer than the plagulae, whereas in A. kyushuensis, the areolate part is only 2.4 to 3.2 times longer than the plagulae.

== Distribution ==
The species A. kyushuensis is known only from Japan. In Japan, this species is found not only on the island of Kyushu but also on the island of Yakushima in the northern Ryukyu Islands in Kagoshima Prefecture. On the island of Kyushu, this species has been found not only at the type locality of Shimabara in Nagasaki Prefecture but also in Kashima in Saga Prefecture and in Yatsushiro in Kumamoto Prefecture.
