= Krateraspis meinerti =

Scientific classification
- Kingdom: Animalia
- Phylum: Arthropoda
- Subphylum: Myriapoda
- Class: Chilopoda
- Order: Geophilomorpha
- Family: Mecistocephalidae
- Genus: Krateraspis
- Species: K. meinerti

Binomial name
- Krateraspis meinerti (Sseliwanoff, 1881)

Synonyms
- Mecistocephalus meinerti Sseliwanoff, 1881; Tygarrup asiaticus Verhoeff, 1930

Species of centipede

Krateraspis meinerti is a species of soil centipede in the family Mecistocephalidae. This centipede is found in Central Asia. This species features 45 pairs of legs without any intraspecific variation and can reach 71 mm in length.

== Discovery and taxonomy ==
This species was first described in 1881 by the Russian myriapodologist Alexey V. Sseliwanoff. Sseliwanoff based the original description of this species on a female holotype found in Chinoz, in the Tashkent region of Uzbekistan. This holotype is deposited in the Zoological Institute of the Russian Academy of Sciences in Saint Petersburg.

Sseliwanoff originally described this species under the name Mecistocephalus meinerti. In 1929, Nikolai G. Lignau proposed the genus Krateraspis to contain this species in its own separate genus. Authorities now consider Krateraspis meinerti to be the valid name for this species.

In 1930, the German zoologist Karl W. Verhoeff described Tygarrup asiaticus as a new species. Verhoeff based the original description of this centipede on nine specimens, including six adults found about 50 km southwest of Tashkent in Uzbekistan. In 1975, the Russian myriapodologist Lidia P. Titova of the USSR Academy of Sciences deemed T. asiaticus to be a junior synonym of K. meinerti. Authorities now consider K. meinerti to be the valid name for the centipedes described by Verhoeff as adult specimens of T. asiaticus.

== Phylogeny ==
A phylogenetic analysis of the family Mecistocephalidae using morphological features places this species in a clade with Krateraspis sselivanovi, the only other described species in the genus Krateraspis. The species K. sselivanovi emerges as the closest relative of K. meinerti in a phylogenetic tree of this family. The evidence also indicates that the common ancestor of these two species had 45 pairs of legs, like K. meinerti but unlike K. sselivanovi, which arrived at 53 leg pairs instead through a evolutionary process that added eight leg-bearing segments..

== Description ==
Females of this species can reach 71 mm in length, whereas the males can reach 58 mm in length. This species features 45 pairs of legs in each sex. This centipede (preserved in an ethanol solution) is usually yellow, with the head, antennae, and forcipular segment a light brown. The clypeus features setae (usually four pairs, rarely three pairs) that are limited to the middle of the anterior part of the clypeus. Each mandible typically features six lamellae, each with five to nine teeth. The ultimate legs are densely covered with setae. These legs are slightly thicker in the male than in the female of this species.

This species shares a distinctive set of features with its close relative K. sselivanovi. For example, both species feature a mid-longitudinal suture on the coxosternite of the first maxillae but not on the coxosternite of the second maxillae, a small claw at the end of the second maxillae, a forcipular tergite that is only slightly (about 1.5 times) wider than long, sternites without pore fields, and ultimate legs that each end in a small apical spine rather than a claw. Furthermore, K. sselivanovi features four pairs of clypeal setae that are limited to the middle of the anterior part of the clypeus, as they are in K. meinertii.

The two species of Krateraspis may be distinguished from one another not only by the number of legs but also by features of their maxillae and forcipules. For example, the first article of the telopodites of the second maxillae in K. sselivanovi features a distal bulge on the external side, whereas this bulge is absent in K. meinerti. Furthermore, the second maxillae in K. meinerti are so long as to extend distinctly beyond the tips of the first maxillae, whereas in K. sselivanovi, the second maxillae only extend about as far as the tips of the first maxillae. Moreover, in K. meinerti, each article of the forcipule features a denticle, whereas in K. sselivanovi, each article has a denticle except for the second, which does not.

== Distribution ==
The species K. meinerti has been recorded in the Turkistan and Jambyl regions in Kazakhstan, the Tashkent region in Uzbekistan, the Lebap region of Turkmenistan, the Jalal-Abad region in Kyrgyzstan, and the Districts of Republican Subordination and the Khatlon and Sughd regions in Tajikistan. This species is distributed from the western Tian Shan to the western branches of the Pamir mountains.
