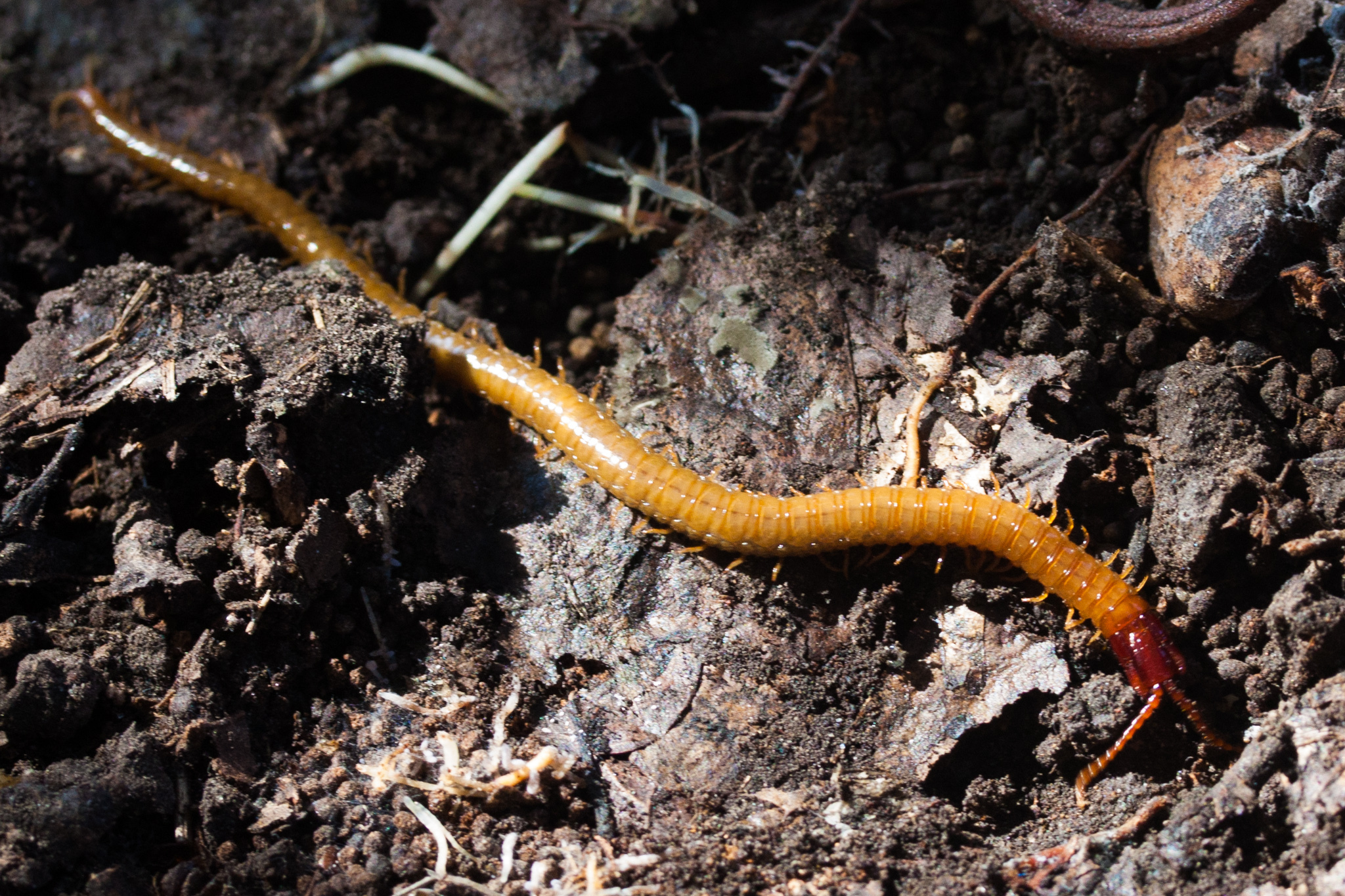
- Dicellophilus limatus

Scientific classification
- Kingdom: Animalia
- Phylum: Arthropoda
- Subphylum: Myriapoda
- Class: Chilopoda
- Order: Geophilomorpha
- Family: Mecistocephalidae
- Genus: Dicellophilus; Cook, 1896

Type species
- Mecistocephalus limatus Wood, 1862

= Dicellophilus =

Genus of centipedes

Dicellophilus is a genus of soil centipedes in the family Mecistocephalidae. This genus was introduced by the American biologist Orator F. Cook in 1896 to contain the species D. limatus, which he explicitly designated as the type species. This genus contains five species and is notable for their highly disjunct geographic distribution.

== Distribution ==
The five species in this genus are each found in one of three limited and unusually disjunct areas. The species D. carniolensis is limited to central Europe, the species D. praetermissus and D. pulcher are both limited to the island of Honshu in Japan, and the species D. anomalus and D. limatus are both limited to the west coast of the United States. The range of each species is no more than 1,300 km in maximum diameter. These species live mostly in montane forests with moderate temperatures. While the ranges of these species all fall within a narrow band of latitude (about 35–45 °N), they are maximally separated in terms of longitude. No other group of centipedes, and no terrestrial animals in the Northern Hemisphere, are known to exhibit such a peculiar geographic distribution.

== Description ==
Centipedes in this genus range from 5 cm to 7 cm in length and have 41 to 45 pairs of legs, with the number of legs invariant within each species. The species D. anomalus, D. praetermissus, and D. pulcher have 41 leg pairs, the species D. carniolensis has 43 pairs, and the type species D. limatus has 45 pairs. In this genus, the body tapers towards the posterior and ranges from pale yellow to orange brown, without dark patches, but the head and forcipular segment is darker than the rest of the body. The antennae taper towards the distal ends. The clypeus is mostly covered with scattered setae, but not on wide bands along the lateral and posterior margins. Each of the posterior lateral sclerites of the labrum features longitudinal folds and a concave posterior margin fringed with bristles. The coxosternite of the first maxillae is divided down the middle by a longitudinal suture, but the coxosternite of the second maxillae is not. The telopodites of the second maxillae reach distinctly beyond the telopodites of the first maxillae. Each of the ultimate legs feature a macropore, that is, a ventral pore that is distinctly larger than all the other pores, as well as a tubercle at the distal end with a few short spines.

== Phylogeny ==
In 2003, a phylogenetic analysis of the family Mecistocephalidae using morphological features placed this genus in the subfamily Dicellophilinae along with the genera Anarrup and Proterotaiwanella. This analysis also placed Dicellophilus in a clade with Anarrup as a closely related sister group. In 2010, a phylogenetic analysis of the genus Dicellophilus based on morphological evidence confirmed the monophyly of the genus and placed the two North American species, D. anomalus and D. limatus, together in a clade. This analysis also placed this North American clade inside another clade along with the Japanese species D. pulcher in a phylogenetic tree.

The genus Dicellophilus shares many traits with its close relatives in the subfamily Dicellophilinae. For example, all three genera in this subfamily feature ultimate legs that each end in a tubercle covered with small spines. The species in Dicellophilus share a more extensive set of traits with their close relatives in Anarrup. For example, the second maxillae reach distinctly beyond the first maxillae in both of these genera but not in Proterotaiwanella.

The species in Dicellophilus can be distinguished from their close relatives in Anarrup, however, based on other traits. For example, the coxosternite of the second maxillae is divided down the middle by a longitudinal suture in Anarrup but not in Dicellophilus. Furthermore, the posterior sclerite of the labrum features bristles on the posterior margin in Dicellophilus but not in Anarrup. Moreover, each of the ultimate legs features a macropore in Dicellophilus but not in Anarrup.

== Species ==
This genus includes five species:

- Dicellophilus anomalus (Chamberlin, 1904)
- Dicellophilus carniolensis (C.L. Koch, 1847)
- Dicellophilus praetermissus Tsukamoto & Eguchi, 2024
- Dicellophilus pulcher (Kishida, 1928)
- Dicellophilus limatus (Wood, 1862)
