= Arrup edentulus =

Scientific classification
- Kingdom: Animalia
- Phylum: Arthropoda
- Subphylum: Myriapoda
- Class: Chilopoda
- Order: Geophilomorpha
- Family: Mecistocephalidae
- Genus: Arrup
- Species: A. edentulus

Binomial name
- Arrup edentulus (Attems, 1904)

Synonyms
- Mecistocephalus edentulus Attems, 1904

Species of centipede

Arrup edentulus is a species of soil centipede in the family Mecistocephalidae. This centipede is one of only two species of Arrup found in Central Asia. This centipede is also one of only five species in the family Mecistocephalidae found in Central Asia. This species features 41 pairs of legs.

== Discovery ==
This species was first described in 1904 by the Austrian myriapodologist Carl Attems based on two small specimens. These specimens were found in 1901 in the town of Karakol in Issyk-Kul Region of Kyrgyzstan. A dissected male syntype is deposited in the Natural History Museum in Vienna.

== Taxonomy ==
Attems originally described this species under the name Mecistocephalus edentulus. In 1928, Attems proposed Nodocephalus as a new genus with Nodocephalus edentulus as the type species. In 1964, the American myriapodologist Ralph E. Crabill Jr., of the Smithsonian Institution in Washington, D.C., deemed Nodocephalus to be a junior synonym of Arrup and moved this species into the genus Arrup. Authorities now consider Arrup to be the valid name for Nodocephalus.

== Description ==
This species features 41 leg-bearing segments and a pale yellow body with a darker head. The areolate area on the anterior part of the clypeus is about two or three times larger than the smooth areas on the posterior part of the clypeus (plagulae). A narrow areolate longitudinal stripe runs down the middle of the clypeus and separates the two plagulae. The pleurites on the sides of the head feature neither setae nor spicula. Both the coxosternite of the first maxillae and the coxosternite of the second maxillae are undivided. The second maxillae lack claws and are too small to reach beyond the first maxillae.

The first article of the forcipule features a distal tooth that is large, dark, and pointed, and the ultimate article features a basal tooth that is small and pointed, but the two intermediate articles feature neither a tooth nor a tubercle. The sternite of the last leg-bearing segment is shaped like a triangle that is wider than long, with a length/width ratio of about 0.75. The basal elements of the ultimate legs feature numerous small pores on the ventral and lateral surfaces, but not on the dorsal surfaces. The ultimate legs lack claws and are swollen and covered with dense setae. The telson features anal pores.

This species exhibits many traits that characterize the genus Arrup. For example, this species features 41 leg pairs and a longitudinal areolate stripe down the middle of the clypeus between two plagulae that do not extend to the lateral margins of the clypeus. Furthermore, as in other species in this genus, no spicula project from the pleurites on the sides of the head, both the coxosternite of the first maxillae and the coxosternite of the second maxillae are undivided, the second maxillae do not reach distinctly beyond the first maxillae, and the first article of the forcipule features only a distal tooth.

This species shares a more extensive set of distinctive traits with the only other species of Arrup described from Central Asia, A. asiaticus. For example, in each of these species, the distal tooth on the first article of the forcipule is large and dark, the ultimate article features a basal tooth, and the second article features neither a tooth nor a tubercle. Furthermore, in each of these species, the second maxillae lack claws, and the basal elements of the ultimate legs only feature pores on the ventral and lateral surfaces, not on the dorsal surfaces.

The species A. edentulus can be distinguished from A. asiaticus, however, based on other traits. For example, the areolate part of the clypeus is about four or five times longer than the plagulae in A. asiaticus but only about two or three times longer than the plagulae in A. edentulus. Furthermore, the areolate stripe between the plagulae is wide in A. asiaticus but narrow in A. edentulus. Moreover, the third article of the forcipule features a small tubercle in A. asiaticus but neither a tubercle nor a tooth in A. edentulus.

== Distribution and habitat ==
The species A. edentulus is found not only in Kyrgyzstan but also in Kazakhstan and Tajikistan. In Kyrgyzstan, this species has been found not only at the type locality (Karakol) in the Issyk-Kul Region but also in litter on a grassy slope near the city of Bishkek in the Chüy Region. In Kazakhstan, this species has been found under stones among Juniperus in a mountain steppe in the Kyrgyz Ala-Too mountain range in the Jambyl Region. Although this species has also been reported found in Taiwan, authorities consider this record dubious in light of the great distance between Taiwan and the type locality.
