= Krateraspis sselivanovi =

Scientific classification
- Kingdom: Animalia
- Phylum: Arthropoda
- Subphylum: Myriapoda
- Class: Chilopoda
- Order: Geophilomorpha
- Family: Mecistocephalidae
- Genus: Krateraspis
- Species: K. sselivanovi

Binomial name
- Krateraspis sselivanovi Titova, 1975

Species of centipede

Krateraspis sselivanovi is a species of soil centipede in the family Mecistocephalidae. This centipede is found in Kyrgyzstan, Tajikistan, and Uzbekistan. This species is notable for featuring 53 leg pairs without any intraspecific variation. This number of legs is rarely observed in the family Mecistocephalidae and may be the maximum number evidently fixed by species in the class Chilopoda.

== Discovery ==
The Russian myriapodologist Lidia P. Titova of the USSR Academy of Sciences first described this species in 1975. She based the original description of this species on a holotype and 19 paratypes found in the Khatlon region as well as one paratype found in Fayzabad district, both located in Tajikistan. Type specimens for this species include both sexes and are deposited in the Zoological Museum of the Moscow State University.

== Phylogeny ==
A phylogenetic analysis of the family Mecistocephalidae using morphological features places this species in a clade with Krateraspis meinerti, the only other described species in the genus Krateraspis. The evidence also indicates that the common ancestor of these two species had 45 pairs of legs, as K. meinerti does. Thus, this evidence suggests that K. sselivanovi arrived at 53 leg pairs through a evolutionary process that added eight leg-bearing segments.

== Description ==
This species reaches a maximum length of 67 mm and has 53 leg pairs. This centipede (preserved in an ethanol solution) is usually yellow, with the head, antennae, and forcipular segment (except for the tergite) a light brown. The clypeus features four pairs of setae that are limited to the middle of the anterior part of the clypeus. Each mandible typically features six lamellae, each with five to seven teeth. The ultimate legs are slender and densely covered with setae.

This species shares a distinctive set of features with its close relative K. meinerti. For example, both species feature a mid-longitudinal suture on the coxosternite of the first maxillae but not on the coxosternite of the second maxillae, a small claw at the end of the second maxillae, a forcipular tergite that is only slightly (about 1.5 times) wider than long, sternites without pore fields, and ultimate legs that each end in a small apical spine rather than a claw. Furthermore, K. meinterti also usually features four pairs of clypeal setae (rarely only three pairs) that are limited to the middle of the anterior part of the clypeus, as they are in K. sselivanovi.

The two species of Krateraspis may be distinguished from one another not only by the number of legs but also by features of their maxillae and forcipules. For example, the first article of the telopodites of the second maxillae in K. sselivanovi features a distal bulge on the external side, whereas this bulge is absent in K. meinerti. Furthermore, the second maxillae in K. meinerti are so long as to extend distinctly beyond the tips of the first maxillae, whereas in K. sselivanovi, the second maxillae only extend about as far as the tips of the first maxillae. Moreover, in K. meinerti, each article of the forcipule features a denticle, whereas in K. sselivanovi, each article has a denticle except for the second, which does not.

== Distribution ==
This species has been recorded in the western branches of the Pamir mountains in the Districts of Republican Subordination and the Khatlon region of Tajikistan, in Daroot-Korgon in the Allay Valley in the Osh region of Kyrgyzstan, and in the Surxondaryo region of Uzbekistan.
