= Agnostrup =

Scientific classification
- Kingdom: Animalia
- Phylum: Arthropoda
- Subphylum: Myriapoda
- Class: Chilopoda
- Order: Geophilomorpha
- Family: Mecistocephalidae
- Genus: Agnostrup; Foddai, Bonato, Pereira & Minelli, 2003

Type species
- Krateraspis striganovae Titova, 1975

Species
- Agnostrup paucipes; Agnostrup striatus; Agnostrup striganovae

Genus of centipedes

Agnostrup is a genus of soil centipedes in the family Mecistocephalidae. This genus contains at least three species. These centipedes are found in temperate regions of East Asia and the Russian Far East. Each species in this genus features 41 pairs of legs.

== Taxonomy and phylogeny ==
This genus was first described in 2003 by the biologists Donatella Foddai, Lucio Bonato, Luis Alberto Pereira, and Alessandro Minelli to contain three species originally assigned to other genera: Taiwanella striata, described in 1949, Taiwanella paucipes, described in 1955, and Krateraspis striganovae, described in 1975. The genus name derives from the Greek word agnostos, which refers to the forgotten status of these three species since their original descriptions, and the name Arrup, which refers to a genus featuring similar morphology. Foddai and her colleagues designated Agnostrup striganovae as the type species for this genus.

Foddai and her colleagues found that a phylogenetic analysis of similar species of soil centipedes based on morphology placed these three species together in their own clade in a phylogenetic tree. Furthermore, a cladistic analysis of the family Mecistocephalidae using morphological features placed the genus Agnostrup in the subfamily Arrupinae, along with the genera Arrup, Nannarrup, and Partygarrupius. Moreover, a cladistic analysis of the subfamily Arrupinae based on external morphology also placed the genus Agnostrup in a clade with a sister group formed by the genera Arrup and Nannarrup.

In 2024, however, a phylogenetic analysis based on molecular data placed Agnostrup in a clade with Nannarrup as a closely related sister group. This analysis placed Arrup by itself on the most basal branch in a phylogenetic tree of the family Mecistocephilidae. This study found so little genetic distance between Agnostrup and Nannarrup that some authors suggest that the morphological differences between these two genera are too minor to justify their separation into distinct genera. These authors propose moving the three species of Nannarrup into the genus Agnostrup. Nevertheless, other references list Nannarrup as a valid genus, with only three species listed in the genus Agnostrup.

== Distribution ==
The species Agnostrup striatus is found in Shanxi province in northeastern China. The species A. paucipes is found on the island of Honshu in Japan. The type species A. striganovae is found in the Maritime Territory (Primorsky Krai) in the Russian Far East.

== Description ==
All species in this genus have 41 leg-bearing segments. The centipedes in this genus range from about 20 mm to 35 mm in length. The body is homogenous in pigmentation, without darker patches. The head in this genus features a transverse suture on the front of the dorsal surface. The side pieces of the labrum are fully divided into anterior and posterior sclerites. The pleurites on the side of the head lack setae, and the clypeus features a longitudinal areolate stripe down the middle. This stripe divides the smooth area in the posterior part of the clypeus into two plagulae, which cover about one-half or more of the clypeus. The anterior part of each plagula features three to eight setae, and the middle of the areolate part of the clypeus also features three to eight setae on each side. The mandible features five or six pectinate lamellae.

The coxosternite of the first maxillae is divided down the middle by a distinct longitudinal suture, but the coxosternite of the second maxillae is undivided. The telopodites of the second maxillae are poorly developed and are too small to reach distinctly beyond the first maxillae. The first article of each forcipule features one large distal tooth, and the ultimate article features one large basal tooth. The groove on the ventral surface of the trunk segments is not forked. The telson features anal pores.

The genus Agnostrup shares many distinctive features with its close relatives in the genus Nannarrup. For example, all species in each of these genera feature 41 leg pairs. Furthermore, in both genera, the first article of the forcipule features a single well developed distal tooth pointing forward, and the ultimate article features a well developed basal tooth.

The species in the genus Agnostrup can be distinguished from their close relatives in the genus Nannarrup, however, based on other traits. For example, the dorsal surface of the head features a transverse frontal line in Agnostrup but not in Nannarrup. Furthermore the clypeus in Nannarrup is largely areolate, with the plagulae limited to about one-sixth of the clypeus, whereas the plagulae ranges from about one-half to most of the clypeus in Agnostrup. Moreover, the setae on the clypeus are limited to the areolate part of the clypeus in Nannarrup but extend to the plagulae in Agnostrup.

The three species in the genus Agnostrup can be distinguished from one another based on other features. For example, the species A. striganovae features a small sharp tooth on the second article of the forcipule, but this tooth in absent in the other two species. Furthermore, the third article of the forcipule features a tubercle in A. striatus and a small sharp tooth in A. stiganovae but exhibits neither feature in A. paucipes.

== Species ==
This genus currently includes at least three accepted species:

- Agnostrup paucipes (Miyosi, 1955)
- Agnostrup striatus (Takakuwa, 1949)
- Agnostrup striganovae (Titova, 1975)
