= Tygarrup anepipe =

Scientific classification
- Kingdom: Animalia
- Phylum: Arthropoda
- Subphylum: Myriapoda
- Class: Chilopoda
- Order: Geophilomorpha
- Family: Mecistocephalidae
- Genus: Tygarrup
- Species: T. anepipe

Binomial name
- Tygarrup anepipe Verhoeff, 1939

Species of centipede

Tygarrup anepipe is a species of soil centipede in the family Mecistocephalidae. This centipede is found in Mauritius in the Indian Ocean. This species features 45 pairs of legs and reaches only 20 mm in length. This centipede is among the smallest species in the genus Tygarrup.

== Discovery and distribution ==
This species was first described in 1939 by the German zoologist Karl W. Verhoeff. He based the original description of this species on specimens collected by the South African myriapodologist Reginald F. Lawrence between 1935 and 1939 on the island of Mauritius. One female syntype is deposited in the Natural History Museum in Vienna. This species is found only in Mauritius.

== Phylogeny ==
In 2003, a cladistic analysis of the family Mecistocephalidae based on morphology placed this species in a clade with another species in the same genus also found in the Indian Ocean, T. javanicus, and an undescribed species of Tygarrup found in the Andaman Islands in the Bay of Bengal. This study finds that these three similar species form a sister group for another species of Tygarrup found in the Himalayas, T. muminabadicus, which this analysis places on a more basal branch of a phylogenetic tree of the family Mecistocephalidae. This evidence suggests that T. anepipe and T. javanicus are close relatives. Indeed, specimens of T. anepipe and T. javanicus are so similar that some authorities have suggested that these centipedes may belong to the same species.

== Description ==
The species T. anepipe can reach 20 mm in length. The basal element of each of the ultimate legs features two large pores above the edges of the adjacent sternum with 12 to 14 smaller pores scattered to the side. This species exhibits many traits that characterize the genus Tygarrup. For example, like most species in this genus, T. anepipe features 45 leg pairs. Furthermore, the clypeus lacks an areolate stripe down the middle, the pleurites on the side of the head lack setae, and the coxosternite of the first maxillae is divided down the middle by a longitudinal suture, but the coxosternite of the second maxillae is undivided. Moreover, the furrow on the sternum of each of the leg-bearing segments is not forked, and the ultimate legs are as slender in males as in females.

This species shares a more extensive set of distinctive traits with the closely related species T. javanicus. For example, each of these species is small, reaching only 20 mm in length. Furthermore, in both species, the posterior margin of the dorsal plate on the head is straight rather than curved, the transverse suture on the head is uniformly curved, and the coxosternite of the first maxillae is more than twice as wide as long, with a width/length ratio falling in the range of 2.3 to 2.8.

These two species can be distinguished, however, based on other traits. For example, the third article of the forcipule features a tooth on the inner side in T. javanicus, but this tooth is virtually absent in T. anepipe. Furthermore, the lateral margins of the head converge strongly towards the rear in T. javanicus but converge only slightly in T. anepipe.
