= Arrup =

Scientific classification
- Kingdom: Animalia
- Phylum: Arthropoda
- Subphylum: Myriapoda
- Class: Chilopoda
- Order: Geophilomorpha
- Family: Mecistocephalidae
- Genus: Arrup; Chamberlin, 1912

Type species
- Arrup pylorus Chamberlin, 1912

Synonyms
- Nodocephalus Attems, 1928; Prolamnonyx Silvestri, 1919

Genus of Mecistocephalidae centipedes

Arrup is a genus of soil centipedes in the family Mecistocephalidae. This genus contains sixteen species. These centipedes are found mainly in temperate regions of East Asia with some species found in Central Asia and California. Most species in this genus are soil-dwellers, but the Japanese species Arrup akiyoshiensis was discovered in a cave and might be a troglobiont.

== Taxonomy and Phylogeny ==
The American biologist Ralph V. Chamberlin first proposed this genus in 1912 to contain a newly discovered centipede, Arrup pylorus, which he designated as the type species. In 2003, a cladistic analysis of the family Mecistocephalidae based on morphology placed the genus Arrup in the subfamily Arrupinae, along with the genera Agnostrup, Nannarrup, and Partygarrupius. Further cladistic analysis of the subfamily Arrupinae based on morphology placed the genus Arrup in a clade with Nannarrup as a closely related sister group. This analysis also placed this clade inside another clade with Agnostrup as a sister group in the same branch of a phylogenetic tree. In 2024, however, a phylogenetic analysis based on molecular data placed Arrup by itself on the most basal branch in a phylogenetic tree of the family Mecistocephilidae, with a sister group including Agnostgrup and Nannarrup together in a separate clade.

== Description ==
Centipedes in this genus range from 1 cm to 5 cm in length. All species in this genus have 41 leg-bearing segments. The body is homogeneous in pigmentation, without darker patches. The side pieces of the labrum are fully divided into anterior and posterior sclerites. The clypeus in this genus is almost completely areolate and features a longitudinal areolate stripe down the middle. The coxosternite of the first maxillae is not divided down the middle by a longitudinal suture, and the coxosternite of the second maxillae is also undivided. The telopodites of the second maxillae are too short to reach distinctly beyond the first maxillae. The forcipular tergum is wider than long, with no longitudinal groove down the middle, and the first article of the forcipule features one distal tooth. The groove on the ventral surface of the trunk segments is not forked. The ultimate legs of the male are as slender as those of the female.

The genus Arrup exhibits many distinctive traits that characterize the subfamily Arrupinae. For example, like all species in this subfamily, species of Arrup feature 41 pairs of legs. Furthermore, as in other members of this subfamily, the telopodites of the second maxillae in Arrup extend no more than slightly beyond the first maxillae.

Other features, however, distinguish the genus Arrup from its closest relatives. For example, the anterior lateral corners of the clypeus feature setae in Arrup, but these setae are absent in all other genera in the subfamily Arrupinae. Furthermore, the coxosternite of the first maxillae is divided down the middle by a longitudinal suture in all other genera in the family Mecistocephalidae but undivided in Arrup.

== Species ==
This genus currently includes sixteen accepted species:

- Arrup akiyoshiensis Tsukamoto & Shimano, 2019
- Arrup areolatus (Shinohara, 1957)
- Arrup asiaticus (Titova, 1975)
- Arrup dentatus (Takakuwa, 1934)
- Arrup doii (Takakuwa, 1940)
- Arrup edentulus (Attems, 1904)
- Arrup holstii (Pocock, 1895)
- Arrup ishiianus Uliana, Bonato & Minelli, 2007
- Arrup kyushuensis Uliana, Bonato & Minelli, 2007
- Arrup lilliputianus Uliana, Bonato & Minelli, 2007
- Arrup longicalix Uliana, Bonato & Minelli, 2007
- Arrup mamaevi (Titova, 1975)
- Arrup obtusus (Takakuwa, 1934)
- Arrup pauroporus (Takakuwa, 1936)
- Arrup pylorus Chamberlin, 1912
- Arrup sauteri (Silvestri, 1919)
