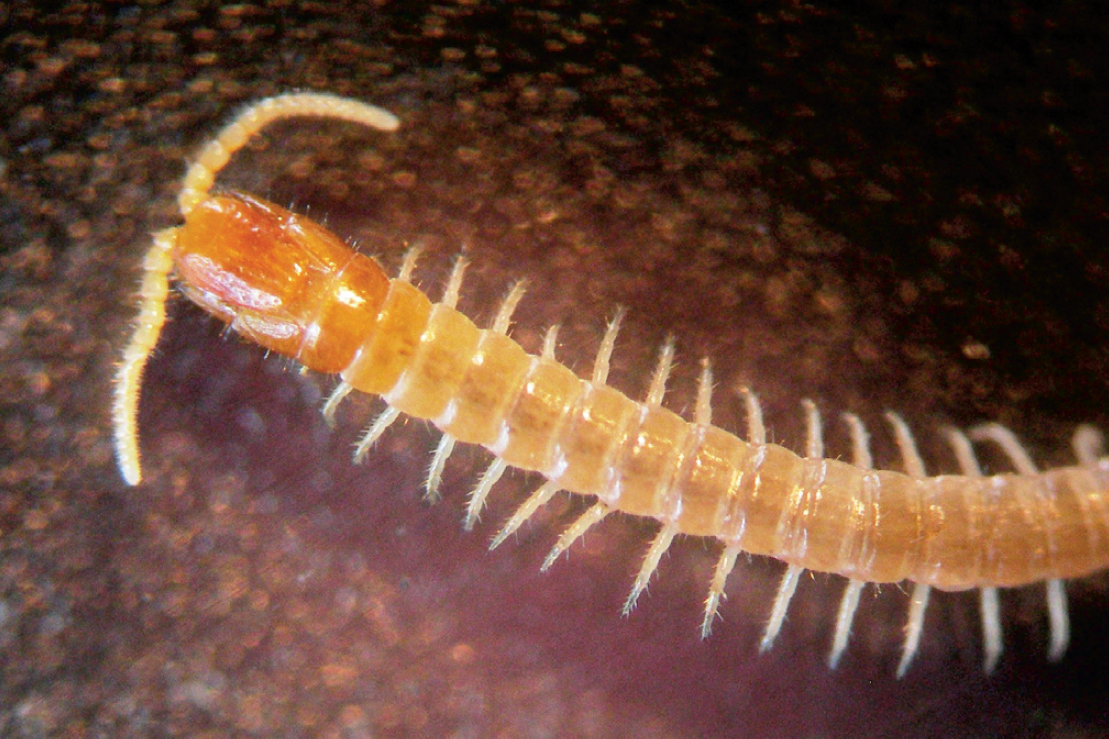

Scientific classification
- Kingdom: Animalia
- Phylum: Arthropoda
- Subphylum: Myriapoda
- Class: Chilopoda
- Order: Geophilomorpha
- Family: Mecistocephalidae
- Genus: Tygarrup
- Species: T. javanicus

Binomial name
- Tygarrup javanicus Attems, 1929

= Tygarrup javanicus =

Species of centipede

Tygarrup javanicus is a species of soil centipede in the family Mecistocephalidae. This centipede is probably native to southeast Asia but has been introduced elsewhere and is widespread in European greenhouses. This species features 45 pairs of legs and reaches only 20 mm in length. This centipede is among the smallest species in the genus Tygarrup.

== Discovery ==
This species was first described in 1929 by the Austrian myriapodologist Carl Attems. He based the original description of this species on specimens collected by the German naturalist Karl Kraepelin in three localities (Cibodas, Ciampea, and the Bogor Botanical Gardens in Bogor) on the island of Java in Indonesia. Six syntypes, including the lectotype, are deposited in the Zoological Museum Hamburg. Other syntypes, including three males and one female, are deposited in the Natural History Museum in Vienna.

== Distribution and ecology ==
Since the discovery of this species on the island of Java, this centipede has been found elsewhere in Asia, from the Himalayas and China to Vietnam, Cambodia, and the Malay Peninsula. This species has also been recorded in the Indian Ocean, not only in Seychelles but also on Round Island in Mauritius. In Seychelles, this centipede has been found at wooded internal sites on the largest islands. This centipede has also been found in Hawaii, where it has probably been introduced by humans, and has been introduced to the island of Martinique in the Caribbean.

This species has also been discovered in the greenhouses of Europe, first in Kew Gardens in London, England, then in Palmenhaus Schönbrunn in Vienna, Austria. This centipede has also been introduced to the Eden Project in Cornwall, England, and to other greenhouses in Germany, the Czech Republic, Slovakia, Poland, Altai Krai in western Siberia in Russia, Switzerland, and France. Authorities do not consider the species T. javanicus likely to threaten native fauna in Europe, where this centipede depends on the heat and humidity maintained in greenhouses for tropical plants and would not survive a cold winter outdoors. This species has been found only in heated greenhouses in these localities.

Two features of this species facilitate accidental transportation by humans and survival in alien environments. First, the small size of this species makes this centipede more likely to remain hidden and find sufficient food in even small amounts of soil. Second, authorities suspect that this species can reproduce by parthenogenesis, allowing even a single female to generate a large population quickly even in the absence of males. All adult specimens collected in Swiss greenhouses were sexed as female, and in a sample of twenty specimens from Seychelles, all seventeen specimens that were sexed were found to be female.

== Phylogeny ==
In 2003, a cladistic analysis of the family Mecistocephalidae based on morphology placed this species in a clade with another species in the same genus, T. anepipe, which is found in the Mascarene Islands in the Indian Ocean, and an undescribed species of Tygarrup found in the Andaman Islands in the Bay of Bengal. This study finds that these three similar species form a sister group for another species of Tygarrup found in the Himalayas, T. muminabadicus, which this analysis places on a more basal branch of a phylogenetic tree of the family Mecistocephalidae. This evidence suggests that T. javanicus and T. anepipe are close relatives. Indeed, specimens of T. javanicus and T. anepipe are so similar that some authorities have suggested that these centipedes may belong to the same species.

== Description ==
The species T. javanicus features 45 leg-bearing segments without any intraspecific variation. This centipede is small, reaching only 20 mm in length. The body ranges from pale yellow to a yellowish orange, with a reddish or brownish orange head and anterior end. The head is about 1.4 times longer than wide. The dorsal surface of the head features a transverse suture at the front that is curved. The first and third articles of the forcipules each feature a tooth, but the second and ultimate articles do not. The basal element of each of the ultimate legs in adults features from 14 to 23 pores on the ventral and lateral surfaces, with two or three pores under the edge of the adjacent sternite. The telson features a pair of large anal pores.

This species exhibits many traits that characterize the genus Tygarrup. For example, like most species in this genus, T. javanicus features 45 leg pairs. Furthermore, the head in this species is distinctly longer than wide, the clypeus lacks an areolate stripe down the middle, the pleurites on the side of the head lack setae, and the coxosternite of the first maxillae is divided down the middle by a longitudinal suture, but the coxosternite of the second maxillae is undivided. Moreover, the furrow on the sternum of each of the leg-bearing segments is not forked, and the ultimate legs are as slender in males as in females.

This species shares a more extensive set of distinctive traits with the closely related species T. anepipe. For example, each of these species is small, reaching only 20 mm in length. Furthermore, in both species, the posterior margin of the dorsal plate on the head is straight rather than curved, the transverse suture on the head is uniformly curved, and the coxosternite of the first maxillae is more than twice as wide as long, with a width/length ratio falling in the range of 2.3 to 2.8.

These two species can be distinguished, however, based on other traits. For example, the third article of the forcipule features a tooth on the inner side in T. javanicus, but this tooth is virtually absent in T. anepipe. Furthermore, the lateral margins of the head converge strongly towards the rear in T. javanicus but converge only slightly in T. anepipe.
