= Dicellophilus anomalus =

Scientific classification
- Kingdom: Animalia
- Phylum: Arthropoda
- Subphylum: Myriapoda
- Class: Chilopoda
- Order: Geophilomorpha
- Family: Mecistocephalidae
- Genus: Dicellophilus
- Species: D. anomalus

Binomial name
- Dicellophilus anomalus (Chamberlin, 1904)

Synonyms
- Mecistocephalus anomalus Chamberlin, 1904

Species of centipede

Dicellophilus anomalus is a species of soil centipede in the family Mecistocephalidae. This centipede is found on the west coast of the United States. This species features 41 pairs of legs without intraspecific variation and can reach 60 mm in length. This centipede is notable as one of only four species in the family Mecistocephiladae found in North America.

== Discovery and taxonomy ==
This species was first described in 1904 by the American biologist Ralph V. Chamberlin. He based the original description of this species on a single male specimen found in Pacific Grove, California. Chamberlin originally described this centipede under the name Mecistocephalus anomalus. In 1919, the Italian zoologist Filippo Silvestri placed this species in the genus Dicellophilus instead. Since then, authorities have assigned this species to the genus Dicellophilus.

== Phylogeny ==
In 2010, a phylogenetic analysis of the genus Dicellophilus based on morphology confirmed the monophyly of the genus and placed D. anomalus in a clade with another species in the same genus, D. limatus. The species D. limatus is found in California. This analysis found that these two North American species form a sister group for the species D. pulcher, which emerged as the next closest relative in a phylogenetic tree of this genus. The species D. pulcher is found in Japan.

== Description ==
The species D. anomalus features 41 leg pairs in each sex and can reach 60 mm in length. The body ranges from yellow to orange-brown, with a reddish brown head. This species exhibits several distinctive traits shared by all the other members of the genus Dicellophilus. For example, as in all species in this genus, each of the posterior lateral sclerites of the labrum features longitudinal folds and a concave posterior margin fringed with bristles. Furthermore, as in all of these species, each of the ultimate legs features not only a ventral pore that is distinctly larger than all the other pores but also a tubercle at the distal end with a few small spines.

The species D. anomalus shares a more extensive set of distinctive traits with its close relatives, D. limatus and D. pulcher. For example, in all three of these species, the terminal article of each of the antennae is elongate, with a length/width ratio ranging from 2.2 to 2.4. Furthermore, in all three species, the distal parts of the coxal projections from the first maxillae are evidently enlarged and subtriangular.

The species D. anomalus shares an especially extensive set of distinctive traits with its closest relative, D. limatus. For example, both D. anomalus and D. limatus feature antennae with elongate setae reaching 300 microns in length, whereas these setae range from 150 to 200 microns in length in D. pulcher. Furthermore, the transverse frontal line on the dorsal surface of the head forms an obvious angle pointing forward in the middle in both D. anomalus and D. limatus but is uniformly rounded in D. pulcher. Moreover, both D. anomalus and D. limatus feature a distinctly isolated pair of setae in the middle of the posterior part of the clypeus, but these setae are absent in D. pulcher.

The species D. limatus can be distinguished from its close relative D. anomalus, however, based on other traits. For example, the species D. limatus features 45 leg pairs, whereas D. anomalus features only 41 leg pairs. Furthermore, the telopodites of the first maxillae are elongate in D. anomalus, more than four times as long as their maximum width, whereas this length/width ratio falls within the range of 3.0 to 3.8 in D. limatus. Moreover, the posterior margin of the sternum of the last leg-bearing segment is a regular convex curve in D. limatus, whereas a short process shaped like a pillow projects from the posterior end of this sternum in D. anomalus.

== Distribution ==
The species D. anomalus has a distribution limited to a region from Oregon, between the Oregon Coast Range and the Cascade Range, to central California, west of the Sierra Nevada. In particular, this species has been recorded in Lebanon in Oregon as well as in Oroville and around Monterey Bay in California.
