= Arrup pylorus =

Scientific classification
- Kingdom: Animalia
- Phylum: Arthropoda
- Subphylum: Myriapoda
- Class: Chilopoda
- Order: Geophilomorpha
- Family: Mecistocephalidae
- Genus: Arrup
- Species: A. pylorus

Binomial name
- Arrup pylorus Chamberlin, 1912

Species of centipede

Arrup pylorus is a species of soil centipede in the family Mecistocephalidae. This centipede is the type species for the genus Arrup. This species is found in California. This centipede is one of only four species in the family Mecistocephalidae found in North America and the only species of Arrup not found in Asia. This species features 41 pairs of legs and can reach 22 mm in length.

== Discovery ==
This species was first described in 1912 by the American biologist Ralph V. Chamberlin. He based the original description of this species on type specimens that he found in Sausalito and Berkeley in California in 1911. He also proposed a new genus, Arrup, to contain the newly discovered species, and designated A. pylorus as the type species for this genus.

== Phylogeny ==
In 2003, a cladistic analysis of the family Mecistocephalidae based on morphology placed the species A. pylorus in a clade with another species in the same genus, A. dentatus. This study also placed another species in this genus, A. holstii, on a more basal branch of a phylogenetic tree of the family Mecistocephalidae. Thus, similarities in morphology suggest that the species A. pylorus and A. dentatus are more closely related to one another than to other species of Arrup.

== Description ==
The species A. pylorus features 41 leg-bearing segments and can reach 22 mm in length, but most specimens fall in the range of 15 mm to 20 mm in length. The body ranges from whitish to pale yellowish, with both the head and antennae a yellowish orange. The anterior end of the body attenuates slightly, whereas the posterior end attenuates more strongly. The first article of the forcipule features a distal tooth that is long, robust, and deeply pigmented, and the ultimate article features a basal tooth that is wide, low, and weakly pigmented, but the intermediate articles lack teeth. The sternite of the last leg-bearing segment is shaped like a triangle that is wider than long.

This species exhibits many traits that characterize the genus Arrup. For example, this species features 41 leg pairs, an areolate stripe down the middle of the clypeus, and a coxosternite of the first maxillae that is not divided down the middle by a longitudinal suture. Furthermore, the anterior part of the tergum of the forcipular segment features no furrow in the middle, the first article of the forcipule features one distal tooth but no proximal tooth, and the furrow down the middle of the sternum of the leg-bearing segments is not forked.

This species shares a more extensive set of traits with the species A. dentatus. For example, these two species are similar in size, and in each species, the poison calyx in the forcipule is relatively short, the ultimate article of the forcipule features an obtuse basal tooth, and the sternite of the last leg-bearing segment is wider than long. Furthermore, in these species, the dorsal surface of the head features a frontal line that is uniformly curved, the pleurites on the sides of the head feature no setae, the mandible in the average adult features only four or five fully developed pectinate lamellae, and the basal element of each of the ultimate legs features pores on the ventral and lateral surfaces but not on the dorsal surface. Moreover, in these species, the smooth areas in the posterior part of the clypeus are from one-quarter to one-third the length of the entire clypeus.

The species A. pylorus can be distinguished from A. dentatus, however, based on other traits. For example, the third article of the forcipule features a well developed tooth in A. dentatus but not in A. pylorus. Furthermore, the poison calyx in the forcipule is exceptionally short in A. pylorus, reaching only the intermediate articles, whereas this channel reaches the distal end of the first article in A. dentatus. Moreover, the coxosternite of the first maxillae is wider relative to its length in A. dentatus: The maximum width of this coxosternite is more than three times its length in A. dentatus but less than three times its length in A. pylorus.

== Distribution and habitat ==
The species A. pylorus is found only in California. This centipede has been recorded not only in the type localities of Berkeley in Alameda County and Sausalito in Marin County but also elsewhere in California. For example, specimens have been collected in redwood litter by Pescadero Creek six miles southeast of Half Moon Bay in San Mateo County, in Douglas fir litter in Sonoma County, and in Caspar in Mendocino County.
