= Krateraspis =

Scientific classification
- Kingdom: Animalia
- Phylum: Arthropoda
- Subphylum: Myriapoda
- Class: Chilopoda
- Order: Geophilomorpha
- Family: Mecistocephalidae
- Genus: Krateraspis; Lignau, 1929

Type species
- Mecistocephalus meinerti Sseliwanoff, 1881

Species
- Krateraspis meinerti; Krateraspis sselivanovi

Genus of centipedes

Krateraspis is a genus of soil centipedes in the family Mecistocephalidae. Centipedes in this genus are found in Central Asia. This genus contains only two species, K. meinerti, with 45 pairs of legs, and K. sselivanovi, with 53 leg pairs. The species K. sselivanovi is notable for featuring 53 leg pairs without any intraspecific variation. This number of legs is rarely observed in the family Mecistocephalidae and may be the maximum number evidently fixed by species in the class Chilopoda.

== Discovery ==
The genus Krateraspis was first proposed by Nikolai G. Lignau in 1929 to contain the species originally described by the Russian myriapodologist Alexey V. Sseliwanoff in 1881 under the name Mecistocephalus meinerti. Sseliwanoff based the original description of this species on a female holotype found in Chinoz, in the Tashkent region of Uzbekistan. This holotype is deposited in the Zoological Institute of the Russian Academy of Sciences in Saint Petersburg.

In 1975, the Russian myriapodologist Lidia P. Titova of the USSR Academy of Sciences described the second species in this genus, Krateraspis sselivanovi. She based the original description of this species on a holotype and 19 paratypes found in the Khatlon region as well as one paratype found in Fayzabad district, both located in Tajikistan. Type specimens for this species are deposited in the Zoological Museum of the Moscow State University.

== Phylogeny ==
A phylogenetic analysis of the family Mecistocephalidae using morphological features places this genus in the subfamily Mecistocephalinae along with the genera Mecistocephalus, Tygarrup, and Takashimaia. This analysis also places the two species in Krateraspis in their own clade with a sister group formed by the genera Mecistocephalus and Takashimaia together on another branch of a phlyogenetic tree. The evidence also indicates that the common ancestor of the subfamily Mecistocephalinae had 45 pairs of legs, as did the common ancestor of each genus in this subfamily, including Krateraspis. Thus, this evidence suggests that K. sselivanovi arrived at 53 leg pairs through a evolutionary process that added eight leg-bearing segments.

== Description ==
The species K. meinerti has 45 pairs of legs and can reach a maximum length of 71 mm. The species K. sselivanovi is similar in size, reaching a maximum length of 67 mm, but has 53 leg pairs. Both species are usually yellow, with the head and antennae a light brown. These centipedes feature relatively stout forcipules.

This genus shares several traits with the three other genera in the subfamily Mecistocephalinae. For example, all four genera feature a small claw at the end of the second maxillae. A set of other traits, however, distinguishes Krateraspis from its close relatives in this subfamily. For example, the clypeus in this genus features only three or four pairs of setae, which are limited to the middle of the anterior part of the clypeus, whereas in the genera Mecistocephalus and Tygarrup, setae are present on the lateral parts of the clypeus. Furthermore, where the anterior part of the side of the head in Mecistocephalus and Takashimaia features a spiculum (a sclerotized pointed projection), this spiculum in absent in the genus Krateraspis.

The two species of Krateraspis may be distinguished from one another not only by the number of legs but also by features of their second maxillae and forcipules. For example, the first article of the second maxillae in K. sselivanovi features a distal bulge on the external side, whereas this bulge is absent in K. meinerti. Furthermore, each article of the forcipule features a denticle in K. meinerti, whereas the second article has no denticle in K. sselivanovi.

== Distribution ==
The species K. meinerti has been recorded in the Turkistan and Jambyl regions in Kazakhstan, the Tashkent region in Uzbekistan, the Lebap region of Turkmenistan, the Jalal-Abad region in Kyrgyzstan, and the Districts of Republican Subordination and the Khatlon and Sughd regions in Tajikistan. This species is distributed from the western Tian Shan to the western branches of the Pamir mountains. The species K. sselivanovi has been found in the western branches of the Pamir mountains in the Districts of Republican Subordination and the Khatlon region of Tajikistan, in Daroot-Korgon in the Allay Valley in the Osh region of Kyrgyzstan, and in the Surxondaryo region of Uzbekistan.
