= Yasunori Miyoshi =

Japanese zoologist (1909–1995)

Yasunori Miyoshi, (三好保徳 Miyoshi Yasunori) born 17 April 1909 and died 19 April 1995, was a Japanese zoologist, ichthyologist, and myriapodologist.

== Major publications ==
- Miyoshi, Y., 1941c. Reproduction and post-embryonic development in Japanese laniatorid, Pseudobiantes japonicus. Acta Arachnologica, Osaka, 6(3): 98–107. 三好保徳; MIYOSHI Yasunori;有鉤類 Laniatores の繁殖と成長に伴う形態の変化
- Miyoshi, Y., 1942. A new species of Sabacon from Japan. . Dobutsugaku Zasshi [Zoological Magazine], Tokyo, 54(4): 165–166.
- Miyoshi, Y., 1942. On the copulation in a species of Eupnoi, Nelima genufusca (Arachnida, Opiliones). Shokubutsu-oyobi-Dobutsu (Plants and Animals), 10(10): 947. [Japanese].
- Miyoshi, Y., 1942. Post-embryonic development of Ischyropsalis abei Sato et Suzuki. Acta arachnologica, 7(3/4): 109–120. [Japanese]. 三好保徳; MIYOSHI Yasunori;サスマタアゴザトウムシ Ischyropsalis abei Sato et Suzuki の生長に伴う形態の変化
- Miyoshi, Y., 1944. Some notes on Sabacon sato-ikioi Miyosi (Opiliones, Arachnida). Acta Arachnologica, Osaka, 9(1/2): 33–43. [en japonais]. 三好保徳; MIYOSHI Yasunori;サラアゴザトウムシ Sabacon sato-ikioi に関する2，3の知見
- Miyoshi, Y., 1944. A list of harvestmen of Mt. Saragamine, Ehime Pref., Japan, and some notes on their hibernation. Acta Arachnologica, Osaka, 9(1/2): 44–50. [en japonais]. 三好保徳; MIYOSHI Yasunori;皿ヶ嶺の瞽蛛とその越冬について
- Miyoshi, Y., 1957. Eine bemerkenswerte neue Art von Travuniidae (Opiliones- Laniatores). Acta Arachnologica, Osaka, 14(2): 63–66, 3 figs. [en allemand].
