= Mount Tottabetsu =

Mountain in Hokkaido, Japan

- 戸蔦別岳
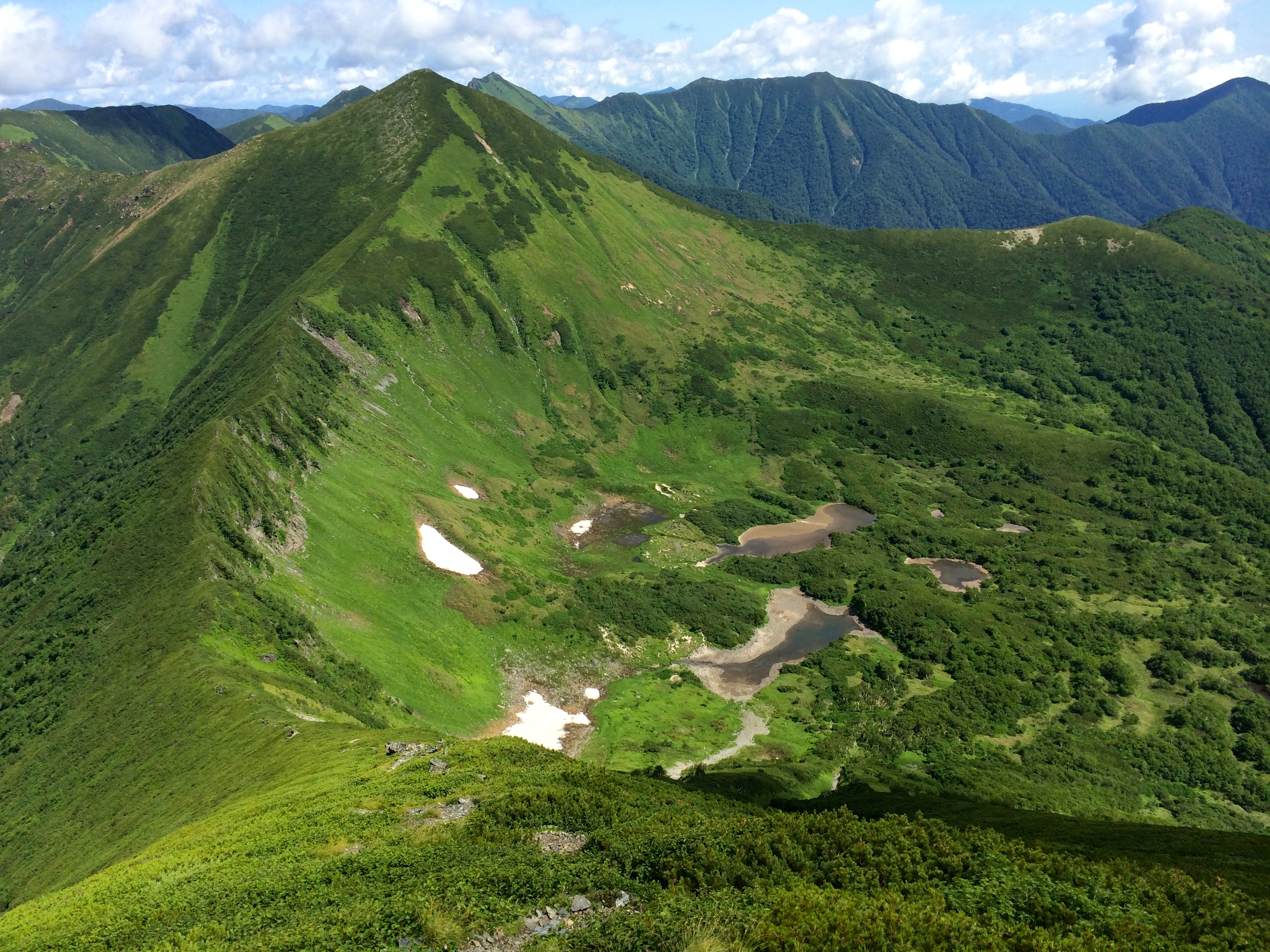

Highest point
- Elevation: 1,959 m (6,427 ft)
- Listing: List of mountains and hills of Japan by height
- Coordinates: 42°44′18″N 142°41′42″E

Geography
- Location: Hokkaidō, Japan
- Parent range: Hidaka Mountains
- Topo map(s): Geographical Survey Institute (国土地理院, Kokudochiriin) 25000:1 幌尻岳, 50000:1 幌尻岳

Geology
- Mountain type: Fold

Mount Tottabetsu (戸蔦別岳, Tottabetsu-dake) is located in the Hidaka Mountains, Hokkaidō, Japan.
