= Anarrup =

Scientific classification
- Kingdom: Animalia
- Phylum: Arthropoda
- Subphylum: Myriapoda
- Class: Chilopoda
- Order: Geophilomorpha
- Family: Mecistocephalidae
- Genus: Anarrup; Chamberlin, 1920

Type species
- Anarrup nesiotes Chamberlin, 1920

Species
- Anarrup flavipes; Anarrup nesiotes

Synonyms
- Sundarrup Attems, 1930

Genus of Mecistocephalidae centipedes

Anarrup is a genus of centipedes in the family Mecistocephalidae. This genus includes only two species, A. nesiotes and A. flavipes. Each of these species is found in Indonesia: A. nesiotes is found in Sulawesi, and A. flavipes is found in the Lesser Sunda Islands. Both species in this genus have 41 pairs of legs.

== Discovery and taxonomy ==
This genus was first described in 1920 by the American biologist Ralph V. Chaberlin to contain the newly discovered type species A. nesiotes. He based the original description of this species on specimens collected in 1896 in South Sulawesi in Indonesia. These specimens were found at an elevation of 5,000 feet above sea level.

The second species in this genus was first described in 1930 by the Austrian myriapodologist Carl Attems. He originally described of this species under the name Sundarrup flavipes as the type species of a newly described genus. He based the original description of this species on specimens found on the islands of Sumbawa, Lombok, and Flores in Indonesia.

In 2003, the Italian biologists Lucio Bonato, Donatella Foddai, and Alessandro Minelli deemed Sundarrup to be a junior synonym of Anarrup. Their cladistic analysis of the family Mecistocephalidae based on morphology placed the species A. nesiotes and S. flavipes together in their own clade in a phylogenetic tree of this family. Authorities now consider Anarrup to be the valid name for Sundarrup.

== Description ==
Both species in this genus have 41 leg-bearing segments. The species A. nesiotes can reach about 60 mm in length, whereas the species A. flavipes can reach 75 mm in length. Centipedes in this genus feature a clypeus with areolation and setae limited to an anterior marginal band, with the setae extending to the anterior lateral corners. The coxosternite of the first maxillae and the coxosternite of the second maxillae are each divided down the middle by a longitudinal suture. The telopodites of the second maxillae are swollen and densely covered with setae. The telopodites of the second maxillae reach distinctly beyond the telopodites of the first maxillae. Each of the ultimate legs end in a spinous tubercle.

The two species in this genus can be distinguished from one another based on other traits. For example, the furrow that runs down the middle of the sternum on each leg-bearing segment divides at the anterior end into two short branches in the species A. nesiotes. This furrow is not forked, however, in the species A. flavipes. Furthermore, the anterior margin of the sternum of the forcipular segment features a pair of short but distinct teeth in A. nesiotes, but these teeth are absent or reduced to two shallow processes in A. flavipes.

== Phylogeny ==
In 2003, a cladistic analysis of the family Mecistocephalidae using morphology placed the genus Anarrup in the subfamily Dicellophilinae, along with the genera Dicellophilus and Proterotaiwanella. This analysis also placed the genus Anarrup in a clade with Dicellophilus, with these two genera forming a sister group for Proterotaiwanella. The genus Anarrup shares many traits with its close relatives in the subfamily Dicellophilinae. For example, all three genera feature ultimate legs that each end in a tubercle covered with small spines.

The species in Anarrup share a more extensive set of traits with their close relatives in Dicellophilus. For example, the second maxillae reach distinctly beyond the first maxillae in both of these genera but not in Proterotaiwanella. Furthermore, the clypeus features setae on the anterior lateral corners in both Anarrup and Dicellophilus but not in Proterotaiwanella.

The species in Anarrup can be distinguished from their close relatives in Dicellophilus, however, based on other traits. For example, the coxosternite of the second maxillae is divided down the middle by a longitudinal suture in Anarrup but not in Dicellophilus. Furthermore, the posterior sclerite of the labrum features bristles on the posterior margin in Dicellophilus but not in Anarrup.

== Species ==
This genus currently includes two accepted species:

- Anarrup flavipes (Attems, 1930)
- Anarrup nesiotes Chamberlin, 1920
