= Mount Poroshiri =

Mountain in Japan

- 幌尻岳
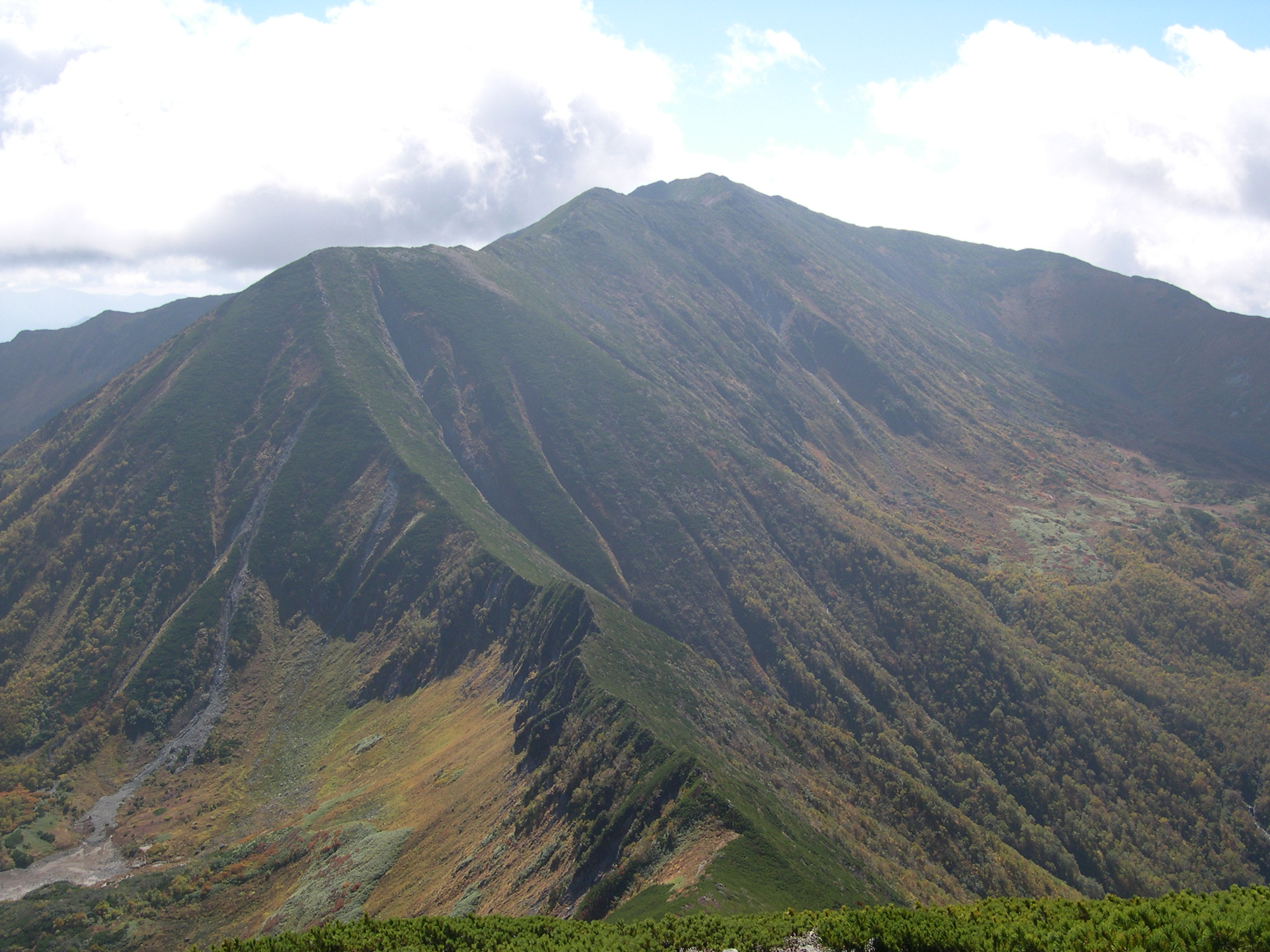
- A view from Mount Tottabetsu (September 2006)

Highest point
- Elevation: 2,052.8 m (6,735 ft)
- Prominence: 1,409 m (4,623 ft)
- Listing: List of mountains and hills of Japan by height Ribu
- Coordinates: 42°43′10″N 142°40′58″E

Naming
- English translation: big mountain
- Language of name: Ainu

Geography
- Location within Japan
- Location: Hokkaidō, Japan
- Parent range: Hidaka Mountains
- Topo map(s): Geospatial Information Authority (国土地理院, Kokudochiriin) 25000:1 幌尻岳; 50000:1 夕張岳

Geology
- Mountain type: Fold

Mount Poroshiri (幌尻岳, Poroshiri-dake) or sometimes Mount Horoshiri is located in the Hidaka Mountains, Hokkaidō, Japan. Its name was derived from a phonetic kanji transcription of the Ainu words for "great mountain", poro-shiri. It is the highest mountain in the Hidaka range, and is one of the 100 famous mountains in Japan.

== Climbing route ==
=== Nukabira course ===
The Nukabira course (額平コ－ス) course is a two-day course.

On the first day, drive 35 km from Furenai (振内) to the Rindō Gate (林道ゲート). From the gate it is a 5 km (2 hours) hike to the Shusui Dam (取水ダーム) on the Nukabira River (額平川). From the dam it is another 4 km (3 hours) to the Poroshiri Mountain Cottage (幌尻山荘, poroshiri-dake san-sou). The cottage is maintained by the Biratori Alpine Club and sits 950 m above sea level.

For the second day, the route climbs 1.5 km (2 hours) from the mountain cottage to the Spring of Life (命の泉, inochi no izumi). The route continues another 2.5 km (2 hours) along the field of alpine flowers past the North Cirque (北カール, kita kāru) to the summit. The route then turns north and runs 3 km (2 hours) along the Seven Pond Cirque (七つ沼カール, nanatsu-numa-kāru) to the summit of Mount Tottabetsu (1959m). From there it is a 1 km (30 minute) walk to Mount Naka Tottabetsu. The route then descends 3 km (2 hours) to the Mount Poroshiri Mountain Cottage.

=== Niikappu River course ===
The Niikappu River course starts at Okuniikappu Hatsudensho gate (奥新冠発電所ゲート). From there the trail proceeds to Okuniikappu Dam (奥新冠ダーム), which forms Lake Poroshiri. From the dam the trail goes to a survey cabin along the Poroshiri River and then onto the mountain ridge before ascending to the summit.
