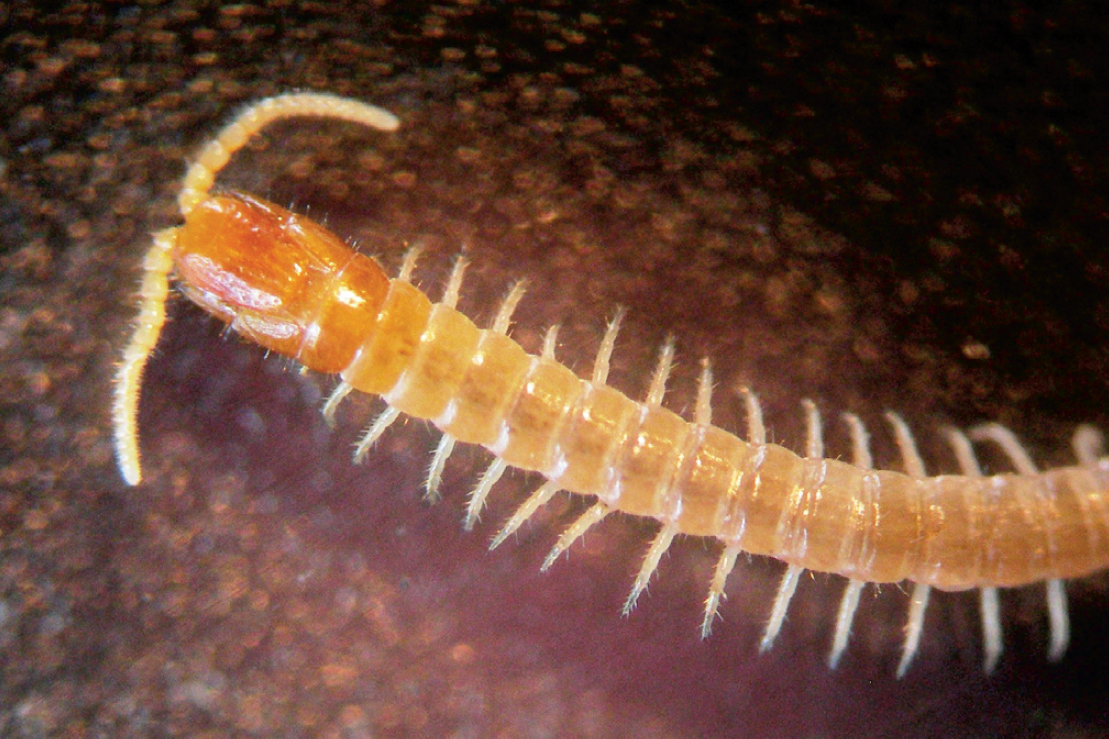
- Tygarrup javanicus

Scientific classification
- Kingdom: Animalia
- Phylum: Arthropoda
- Subphylum: Myriapoda
- Class: Chilopoda
- Order: Geophilomorpha
- Family: Mecistocephalidae
- Genus: Tygarrup; Chamberlin, 1914

Type species
- Tygarrup intermedius Chamberlin, 1914

Synonyms
- Brahmaputrus Verhoeff, 1942

= Tygarrup =

Genus of Mecistocephalidae centipedes

Tygarrup is a genus of soil centipedes in the family Mecistocephalidae. These centipedes are found mainly in tropical and subtropical regions of East Asia and southeast Asia and from Seychelles to Hawaii. The species in this genus have adapted to a broad range of habitats, from sea level to high mountains and from tropical rainforests to cold montane forests. The species Tygarrup javanicus has spread to greenhouses in Europe.

== Taxonomy ==
This genus was first described by the American biologist Ralph V. Chamberlin in 1914 to contain the newly discovered type species T. intermedius. In 1942, the German zoologist Karl W. Verhoeff described Brahmaputrus as a new genus to contain the newly discovered type species B. poriger. In 1968, however, the American myriapodologist Ralph E. Crabill deemed Brahmaputrus to be a junior synonym of Tygarrup. Authorities now consider Tygarrup to be the valid name for Brahmaputrus.

== Description ==
Centipedes in this genus feature heads that are distinctly longer than wide. The clypeus lacks a longitudinal areolate stripe down the middle, and the pleurites on the side of the head lack setae. The coxosternite of the first maxillae is divided down the middle by a longitudinal suture, but the coxosternite of the second maxillae is undivided. The second maxillae are well developed and reach beyond the first maxillae. Each of the second maxillae ends in a claw. The forcipular tergum is slightly wider than long, without a distinct longitudinal groove in the middle. The groove on the ventral surface of the trunk segments is not forked. The ultimate legs are as slender in the male as in the female.

Species in this genus range from 2 cm to 6 cm in length. These species can have either 43 or 45 leg-bearing segments. Most of these species have 45 leg pairs (e.g., Tygarrup anepipe, T. daliensis, T. diversidens, T. griseoviridis, T. javanicus, T. malabarus, T. muminabadicus, T. nepalensis, T. poriger, T. singaporiensis, and T. takarazimensis). An undescribed Tygarrup species found in the Andaman Islands has 43 leg pairs.

== Phylogeny ==
A phylogenetic analysis of the family Mecistocephalidae based on morphology places the genus Tygarrup in the subfamily Mecistocephalinae along with the genera Krateraspis, Mecistocephalus, and Takashimaia. This analysis also places the genus Tygarrup on the most basal branch of a phylogenetic tree in this subfamily with the other three genera in a clade forming a sister group for Tygarrup. The genera in this subfamily share a set of distinctive traits, including a head that is evidently longer than wide, a divided coxosternum of the first maxillae, an undivided coxosternum of the second maxillae, well developed second maxillae that each feature a claw, and a forcipular tergum that is slightly wider than long.

A set of other traits, however, distinguishes Tygarrup from its close relatives in this subfamily. For example, where the anterior part of the side of the head in Mecistocephalus and Takashimaia features a spiculum (a sclerotized pointed projection), this spiculum in absent in Tygarrup. Furthermore, where the central part of the clypeus is areolate with a longitudinal areolate stripe running down the middle of the posterior part of the clypeus in Krateraspis and Mecistocephalus, both of these areas of areolation are absent in Tygarrup.

== Species ==
Currently accepted species include:

- Tygarrup anepipe Verhoeff, 1939
- Tygarrup crassignathus Titova, 1983
- Tygarrup daliensis Chao, Lee, Yang & Chang, 2020
- Tygarrup diversidens Silvestri, 1919
- Tygarrup griseoviridis Verhoeff, 1937
- Tygarrup intermedius Chamberlin, 1914
- Tygarrup javanicus Attems, 1929
- Tygarrup malabarus Chamberlin R., 1944
- Tygarrup muminabadicus Titova, 1965
- Tygarrup nepalensis Shinohara, 1965
- Tygarrup poriger Verhoeff, 1942
- Tygarrup quelpartensis Paik, 1961
- Tygarrup singaporiensis Verhoeff K.W., 1937
- Tygarrup takarazimensis Miyosi, 1957
- Tygarrup triporus Titova, 1983
