= Arrup holstii =

Scientific classification
- Kingdom: Animalia
- Phylum: Arthropoda
- Subphylum: Myriapoda
- Class: Chilopoda
- Order: Geophilomorpha
- Family: Mecistocephalidae
- Genus: Arrup
- Species: A. holstii

Binomial name
- Arrup holstii (Pocock, 1895)

Synonyms
- Geophilus holstii Pocock, 1895

Species of centipede

Arrup holstii is a species of soil centipede in the family Mecistocephalidae. This species is found in Japan, features 41 pairs of legs, and can reach about 20 mm in length. This centipede was the first species in the genus Arrup to be described.

== Discovery ==
This species was first described in 1895 by the British zoologist Reginald I. Pocock. He based the original description of this species on a male holotype found in Ashinoju on the island of Honshu in Japan. This holotype is deposited in the Natural History Museum in London.

In 2007, biologists found this holotype to be in such poor condition as to be unidentifiable and proposed replacing this holotype with a male neotype collected in 1997 in the city of Mobara in Chiba Prefecture on the island of Honshu. This neotype is deposited in National Museum of Nature and Science in Tokyo. In 2008, the International Commission on Zoological Nomenclature ruled in favor of this proposal.

== Taxonomy ==
Pocock originally described this species under the tentative name Geophilus holstii. In 1919, the Italian zoologist Filippo Silvestri proposed Prolamnonyx as a new genus and moved G. holstii into this genus as the type species. In 1964, the American myriapodologist Ralph E. Crabill Jr., of the Smithsonian Institution in Washington, D.C., deemed Prolamnonyx to be a junior synonym of Arrup and moved the species P. holstii into the genus Arrup.

In 1901, the Austrian myriapodologist Carl Attems described Mecistocephalus indecorus as a new species based on a male specimen found in Beijing in China. In 1919, however, Silvestri deemed M. indecorus to be a junior synonym of A. holstii. Some references have since adopted this proposed synonymy, but other authorities regard this synonymy as unwarranted.

== Description ==
This species features 41 leg-bearing segments and can reach at least 21 mm in length. The body is yellow without dark patches, but the head is reddish brown. The head is 1.5 times longer than wide and features a curved transverse frontal line on the dorsal surface. Each antenna is about 3.5 times longer than the head is wide. The areolate part of the clypeus is four to five times longer than the smooth areas in the posterior part (plagulae). The anterior sclerites on the side pieces of the labrum are shaped like triangles, with the inner margin reduced to a vertex adjacent to the middle piece. The mandible features about five to seven lamellae, with five or six teeth on the first lamella and about 10 to 14 teeth on the average middle lamella. The distal lobe of each of the coxal projections of the first maxillae is shaped like a club at the tip. The distal end of each of the second maxillae features three or four small tubercles instead of a claw.

The first article of the forcipule in this species features a distal tooth that points forward and is sharp but quite small. The second article of the forcipule lacks a distinct tooth, the third article features a small tubercle, and the ultimate article features a sharp basal tooth. The poison calyx inside the forcipule of the male of this species is long, with this channel extending all the way to the posterior part of the forcipular sternum. The sternum of the last leg-bearing segment is shaped like a triangle that is as long as wide. The basal element of each of the ultimate legs features about 12 pores.

This species exhibits many traits that characterize the genus Arrup. For example, this species features 41 leg pairs, an areolate stripe down the middle of the clypeus, no setae on the pleurites on the sides of the head, and a coxosternite of the first maxillae that is not divided down the middle by a longitudinal suture. Furthermore, the anterior part of the tergum of the forcipular segment features no furrow in the middle, the first article of the forcipule features one distal tooth, and the furrow down the middle of the sternum of the leg-bearing segments is not forked.

This species shares a more extensive set of distinctive traits with another species in the same genus, A. kyushuensis, which is also found in Japan. For example, in each of these two species, adults are between 15 mm and 30 mm long, a frontal line is evident on the head, the basal part of each of the coxal projections of the first maxillae is less than three times as long as the distal lobe, the second maxillae lack claws, and the sternum of the last leg-bearing segment is as long as wide. Furthermore, in both species, the forcipule features a tooth on the first article that tapers to a point, only a small tubercle on the third article, and a sharp tooth on the ultimate article.

The species A. holstii can be distinguished from A. kyushuensis, however, based on other traits. For example, the tooth on the first article of the forcipule is small and points forward in A. holstii but is large and triangular and projects out in A. kyushuensis. Furthermore, the distal lobe of each of the coxal projections of the first maxillae is distinctly swollen at the tip (clavate) in A. holstii but only slightly clavate in A. kyushuensis. Moreover, the areolate part of the clypeus is larger in A. holstii, about four to five times longer than the plagulae, whereas in A. kyushuensis, the areolate part is only 2.4 to 3.2 times longer than the plagulae.

== Distribution ==
The species A. holstii has been recorded in not only Japan but also Taiwan, Korea, and eastern China. In Japan, this species has been recorded on not only the island of Honshu but also the islands of Hokkaido, Shikoku, and Kyushu, as well as the Ryukyu Islands. The only reliable records, however, are from the area near Tokyo on the island of Honshu. Other records require confirmation, especially records from outside Japan, because many are probably based on misidentified specimens. Authorities suspect that many specimens of Arrup were assigned to A. holstii without adequate evaluation.
