= Escaryus polygonatus =

Scientific classification
- Kingdom: Animalia
- Phylum: Arthropoda
- Subphylum: Myriapoda
- Class: Chilopoda
- Order: Geophilomorpha
- Family: Schendylidae
- Genus: Escaryus
- Species: E. polygonatus

Binomial name
- Escaryus polygonatus Titova, 1973

Species of centipede

Escaryus polygonatus is a species of soil centipede in the family Schendylidae. This centipede is found in the Maritime territory (Primorsky Krai) of the Russian Far East. This species features 39 pair of legs in both sexes and can reach 28 mm in length.

== Discovery ==
This species was first described in 1973 by the Russian myriapodologist Lidia P. Titova. Titova based the original description of this species on a male holotype and seventeen paratypes, including nine males and eight females. These specimens were found in the Ussuriysky Nature Reserve and the Kedrovaya Pad Nature Reserve, which are both in the Maritime territory (Primorsky Krai) of Russia. These type specimens are deposited in the Zoological Museum of the Moscow State University.

== Description ==
This species features 39 pair of legs in each sex and can reach 28 mm in length. The body is a bright yellow, but the head is darker. The species name refers to the distinctly polygonal shape of the depressions that appear in the center of each sternite in the anterior part of the body.

The posterior margin of the labrum features a relatively deep concave arch in the middle and denticles that are short and obtuse. One pair of lappets project from the lateral margins of the telopodites of the first maxillae. The first three articles of the forcipules feature small bulges, but the ultimate article features no denticle. Relatively sparse setae appear on the sternites. The sternite of the ultimate leg-bearing segment has the shape of a trapezoid that is longer than wide (with a length/width ratio of 1.5). The basal element of the ultimate legs features pores on both the ventral and lateral surfaces. Anal pores are present on the telson. This species shares many traits with other species in the genus Escaryus. For example, like other species in this genus, this species has an elongated head, denticles in the middle of the labrum, lappets on the first maxillae, and ultimate legs ending in claws.

This species shares an especially extensive set of distinctive traits with the species E. chichibuensis, which is also found in the Russian Far East. This species, like E. polygonatus, features short and obtuse denticles on the labrum, one pair of lappets on the telopodites of the first maxillae, anal pores, and small bulges on the first three article of the forcipules but no denticle on the ultimate article. Furthermore, the sternite of the ultimate leg-bearing segment in both species has a trapezoidal shape. These two species also feature similar numbers of legs, but E. chichibuensis exhibits intraspecific variation in segment number, with 35, 37, or 39 leg pairs, whereas E. polygonatus features 39 leg pairs in all specimens.

Several other features distinguish E. polygonatus from E. chichibuensis. For example, the sternite of the ultimate leg-bearing segment in E. polygonatus is markedly longer than wide, whereas this sternite is about as long as wide in E. chichibuensis. Furthermore, where E. polygonatus features a relatively deep arch on the labrum, E. chichibuensis features a relatively shallow arch instead. Moreover, E. polygonatus usually ranges from 22 mm to 27 mm in length, which is somewhat larger than E. chichibuensis, which measures about 20 mm in length.
