= Escaryus dentatus =

Scientific classification
- Kingdom: Animalia
- Phylum: Arthropoda
- Subphylum: Myriapoda
- Class: Chilopoda
- Order: Geophilomorpha
- Family: Schendylidae
- Genus: Escaryus
- Species: E. dentatus

Binomial name
- Escaryus dentatus Titova, 1973

Species of centipede

Escaryus dentatus is a species of soil centipede in the family Schendylidae. This centipede is found in the Maritime territory (Primorsky Krai) of the Russian Far East. This species was first described in 1973 by the Russian myriapodologist Lidia P. Titova.

== Discovery ==
Titova based the original description of this species on 22 specimens (twelve females, six males, and four juveniles). These specimens were found in the Ussuriysky Nature Reserve and the Kedrovaya Pad Nature Reserve, which are both in the Maritime territory (Primorsky Krai) of Russia. A female holotype and eleven paratypes (six males and five females) are deposited in the Zoological Museum of the Moscow State University.

== Description ==
This species features 37 or 39 pairs of legs in both sexes. These centipedes are small, ranging from 15 mm to 20 mm in length. Both the body and the head are light yellow. The second and third articles of the forcipules feature small denticles, but both of the other articles feature large denticles. The name of the species refers to the notably large denticles on the first and fourth articles of the forcipules.

The posterior margin of the labrum features a relatively shallow concave arch in the middle and denticles that are short and obtuse. One pair of lappets extend from the lateral margins of the telopodites of the first maxillae. Relatively sparse setae appear on the sternites. The sternite of the ultimate leg-bearing segment has the shape of a trapezoid that is slightly longer than wide. The basal element of the ultimate legs features pores on both the ventral and lateral surfaces. Anal pores are present on the telson.

This species shares many traits with other species in the genus Escaryus. For example, like other species in this genus, this species features denticles in the middle of the labrum and lappets on the first maxillae. Furthermore, the ultimate legs in this species, like those of other species in this genus, end in claws, and in the male, these legs are thick and densely covered with setae.

This species shares an especially extensive set of distinctive traits with the species E. molodovae, which also is found in the Russian Far East. This species, like E. dentatus, features short and obtuse denticles and a shallow arch on the labrum, one pair of lappets on the appendages of the first maxillae, denticles on each article of the forcipules, and anal pores. Furthermore, the sternite of the ultimate leg-bearing segment in both species has a trapezoidal shape.

Several features, however, distinguish E. dentatus from E. molodovae. For example, where E. dentatus features small denticles on the second and third articles of the forcipules and large denticles on both of the other articles, E. molodovae instead features small denticles on the first three articles and a large denticle on only the ultimate article. Furthermore, the sternite of the ultimate leg-bearing segment is slightly longer than wide in E. dentatus, whereas this sternite is about as long as wide in E molodovae. Moreover, E. molodovae is smaller, ranging from 10 mm to 14 mm in length, and has fewer legs, with only 35 leg pairs in each sex, than E. dentatus does.
