= Escaryus hirsutus =

Scientific classification
- Kingdom: Animalia
- Phylum: Arthropoda
- Subphylum: Myriapoda
- Class: Chilopoda
- Order: Geophilomorpha
- Family: Schendylidae
- Genus: Escaryus
- Species: E. hirsutus

Binomial name
- Escaryus hirsutus Titova, 1973

Species of centipede

Escaryus hirsutus is a species of soil centipede in the family Schendylidae. This centipede is found on Sakhalin island in the Russian Far East. This species features 37 or 39 pairs of legs in both sexes and can reach 25 mm in length.

== Discovery ==
This species was first described in 1973 by the Russian myriapodologist Lidia P. Titova. Titova based the original description of this species on 31 specimens (ten males, fourteen females, and seven juveniles). These specimens were collected on Chekhova mountain near the city of Yuzhno-Sakhalinsk on Sakhalin island in Russia. A female holotype and ten paratypes (five males and five females) are deposited in the Zoological Museum of the Moscow State University.

== Description ==
This species features 37 or 39 pairs of legs in each sex. These centipedes range from 18 mm to 25 mm in length. The body is light yellow, but the head is darker. The species name refers to the long and dense setae that cover the sternites in the anterior half of the body.

The posterior margin of the labrum features a relatively deep concave arch in the middle and denticles that are long and obtuse. One pair of lappets extend from the lateral margins of the telopodites of the first maxillae. All four articles of the forcipules feature large bulges. The sternite of the ultimate leg-bearing segment is nearly rectangular and is longer than wide (with a length/width ratio of about 1.5). The basal element of the ultimate legs feature pores on lateral as well as ventral surfaces. Anal pores are present on the telson.

This species shares many traits with other species in the genus Escaryus. For example, like other species in this genus, this species has an elongated head, denticles in the middle of the labrum, and lappets on the first maxillae. Furthermore, the ultimate legs in this species, like those of other species in this genus, feature many pores and end in claws.

This species shares an especially extensive set of distinctive traits with the species E. vitimicus, which also is found in the Russian Far East. This species, like E. hirsutus, features long and obtuse denticles on the labrum, one pair of lappets on the telopodites of the first maxillae, bulges on all article of the forcipules, and anal pores. Furthermore, the sternite of the ultimate leg-bearing segment in each species has the shape of a rectangle with a length/width ratio of 1.5. These two species are also similar in size (with E. vitimicus reaching 27 mm in length) and have similar numbers of legs (with 37 leg pairs in each sex in E. vitimicus).

Several features, however, distinguish E. hirsutus from E. vitimicus. For example, the setae covering the sternites in E. hirsutus are relatively dense, but these setae are relatively sparse in E. vitimicus. Furthermore, all the bulges on the forcipules in E. hirsutus are large, whereas all those in E. vitimicus are small. Moreover, where E. hirsutus features a relatively deep arch on the labrum, E. vitimicus features a relatively shallow arch instead.
