= Escaryus molodovae =

Scientific classification
- Kingdom: Animalia
- Phylum: Arthropoda
- Subphylum: Myriapoda
- Class: Chilopoda
- Order: Geophilomorpha
- Family: Schendylidae
- Genus: Escaryus
- Species: E. molodovae

Binomial name
- Escaryus molodovae Titova, 1973

Species of centipede

Escaryus molodovae is a species of soil centipede in the family Schendylidae. This centipede is found on Sakhalin island in the Russian Far East. This species features 35 pairs of legs in each sex and is notable for its small size, reaching only 14 mm in length.

== Discovery ==
This species was first described in 1973 by the Russian myriapodologist Lidia P. Titova. She based the original description of this species on a male holotype and eight paratypes, including five males and three females. These specimens were found on Chekhova mountain near the city of Yuzhno-Sakhalinsk on Sakhalin island in Russia. This species is named in honor of L.P. Molodova, who collected all nine type specimens. These specimens are deposited in the Zoological Museum of the Moscow State University.

== Description ==
This species is small, with specimens ranging from 10 mm to 14 mm in length. These centipedes are light yellow. Both males and females of this species feature 35 pairs of legs.

The posterior margin of the labrum features a relatively shallow concave arch in the middle and denticles that are short and obtuse. One pair of lappets project from the lateral margins of the telopodites of the first maxillae. The first three articles of the forcipules feature small denticles, but the base of the ultimate article features a large pointed denticle. Relatively sparse setae appear on the sternites. The sternite of the ultimate leg-bearing segment has the shape of a trapezoid that is about as wide as long. The basal element of the ultimate legs feature pores only on the ventral surface. Anal pores are present on the telson.

This species shares many traits with other species in the genus Escaryus. For example, like other species in this genus, this species has an elongated head, denticles in the middle of the labrum, and lappets on the first maxillae. Furthermore, the ultimate legs in this species, like those of other species in this genus, end in claws, and in the male, these legs are thick and densely covered with setae.

This species shares an especially extensive set of distinctive traits with the species E. dentatus, which also is found in the Russian Far East. This species, like E. molodovae, features short and obtuse denticles and a shallow arch on the labrum, one pair of lappets on the telopodites of the first maxillae, denticles on each article of the forcipules, and anal pores. Furthermore, the sternite of the ultimate leg-bearing segment in both species has a trapezoidal shape.

Several features, however, distinguish E. molodovae from E. dentatus. For example, where E. dentatus features small denticles on only the second and third articles of the forcipules and large denticles on the other two articles, E. molodovae instead features small denticles on the first three articles and a large denticle on only the ultimate article. Furthermore, the sternite of the ultimate leg-bearing segment is slightly longer than wide in E. dentatus, whereas this sternite is about as long as wide in E molodovae. Moreover, E. dentatus is larger, ranging from 15 mm to 20 mm in length, and has more legs, with 37 or 39 leg pairs in both sexes, than E. molodovae.
