= Escaryus vitimicus =

Scientific classification
- Kingdom: Animalia
- Phylum: Arthropoda
- Subphylum: Myriapoda
- Class: Chilopoda
- Order: Geophilomorpha
- Family: Schendylidae
- Genus: Escaryus
- Species: E. vitimicus

Binomial name
- Escaryus vitimicus Titova, 1973

Species of centipede

Escaryus vitimicus is a species of soil centipede in the family Schendylidae. This centipede is found in the Republic of Buryatia in the Russian Far East. This species features 37 pairs of legs in each sex and can reach 27 mm in length.

== Discovery ==
This species was first described in 1973 by the Russian myriapodologist Lidia P. Titova. She based the original description of this species on a female holotype and three paratypes, including two females and one male. These specimens were found along the Vitim river in the Republic of Buryatia in Russia. The species name refers to this type locality. The type specimens are deposited in the Zoological Museum of the Moscow State University.

== Description ==
This species features 37 leg pairs both sexes. These centipedes are small, reaching only 27 mm in length. The body is light yellow, but the head is darker. The posterior margin of the labrum features a relatively shallow concave arch in the middle and denticles that are long and obtuse. One pair of lappets extend from the lateral margins of the telopodites of the first maxillae. All four articles of the forcipules feature small bulges. Relatively sparse setae appear on the sternites. The sternite of the ultimate leg-bearing segment has the shape of a rectangle that is longer than wide (with a length/width ratio of about 1.5). The basal element of the ultimate legs features pores on both the ventral and lateral surfaces, with the largest pores near the sternite. Anal pores are present on the telson.

This species shares many traits with other species in the genus Escaryus. For example, like other species in this genus, this species has an elongated head, denticles in the middle of the labrum, lappets on the first maxillae, and ultimate legs ending in claws. Furthermore, the ultimate legs in the male of this species, like those of other species in this genus, are thick and densely covered with setae.

This species shares an especially extensive set of distinctive traits with the species E. hirsutus, which also is found in the Russian Far East. This species, like E. vitimicus, features long and obtuse denticles on the labrum, one pair of lappets on the telopodites of the first maxillae, bulges on all article of the forcipules, and anal pores. Furthermore, the sternite of the ultimate leg-bearing segment in each species has the shape of a rectangle with a length/width ratio of 1.5. These two species are also similar in size (with E. hirsutus ranging from 18 mm to 25 mm in length) and have similar numbers of legs (with 37 or 39 leg pairs in both sexes in E. hirsutus).

Several features, however, distinguish E. vitimicus from E. hirsutus. For example, all the bulges on the forcipules in E. vitimicus are small, whereas all those in E. hirsutus are large. Furthermore, where E. vitimicus features a relatively shallow arch on the labrum, E. hirsutus features a relatively deep arch instead. Moreover, the setae on the sternites in E. vitimicus are relatively sparse, but these setae are relatively dense in E. hirsutus.
