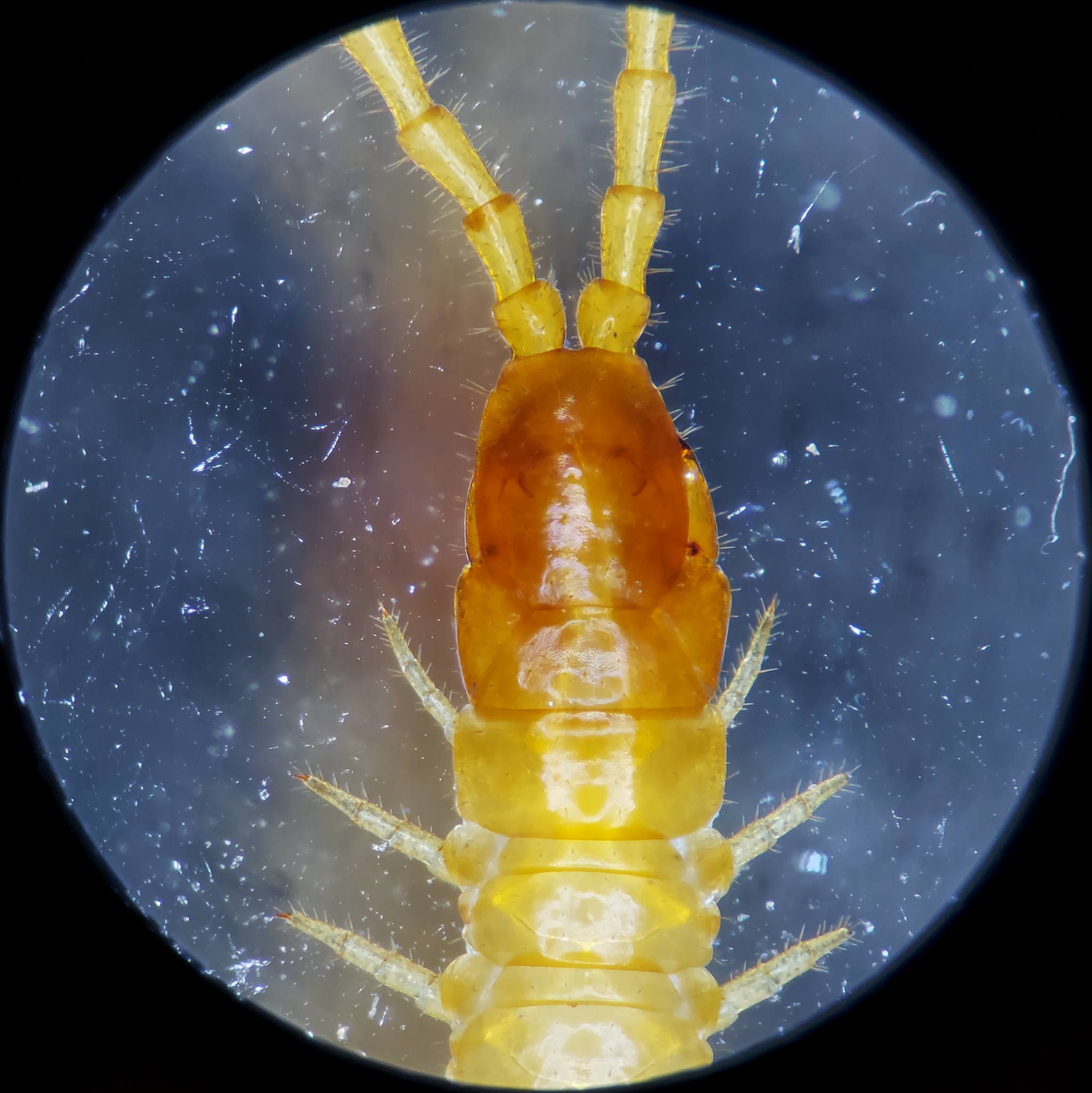
- Escaryus liber

Scientific classification
- Kingdom: Animalia
- Phylum: Arthropoda
- Subphylum: Myriapoda
- Class: Chilopoda
- Order: Geophilomorpha
- Family: Schendylidae
- Genus: Escaryus; Cook & Collins, 1891

Type species
- Escaryus phyllophilus Cook & Collins, 1891

= Escaryus =

Genus of centipedes

Escaryus is a genus of soil centipedes in the family Schendylidae. These centipedes are notable as schendylids adapted to colder temperatures and restricted to cool climates and high latitudes. With more than 30 species, this genus is easily the largest group of such centipedes in the family Schendylidae. Most schendylids are limited to tropical or subtropical regions.

== Distribution ==
These centipedes are found in subarctic and temperate regions of the Holarctic realm. This genus is distributed in Eurasia from Moldova, Crimea, and the Caucasus mountains to Siberia, the Russian Far East, Korea, and northern Japan. In North America, these centipedes are found in coastal and central Alaska, the Yukon territory in Canada, Utah, and from Kansas to Minnesota, Virginia, New York, and Massachusetts. Species in this genus are mostly associated with mountainous regions.

== Taxonomy ==
This genus was first proposed in 1891 by the American biologists Orator F. Cook and Guy N. Collins. They described this genus to contain two species, including E. phyllophilus, which they described as a new species based on specimens collected in Syracuse, New York. The name Escaryus is an anagram of Syracuse. Cook would later designate E. phyllophilus as the type species for this genus, but E. phyllophilus is now deemed to be a junior synonym of E. urbicus. When Cook first proposed Schendylidae as a family in 1896, he listed Escaryus as one of five genera included in the newly described family.

== Description ==
Species in this genus feature heads that are slightly longer than wide and antennae that taper gradually. The middle part of the labrum features distinct denticles. Lappets project from the lateral margins of the first maxillae. The second maxillae end in claws fringed by two rows of filaments. The forcipular tergite is narrower than the following tergite. The sternites lack ventral fields of pores. The basal part of the ultimate legs features many scattered pores. Each of the ultimate legs features seven segments and ends in a claw. In both sexes, each gonopod features two joints.

Centipedes in this genus range from about 1 cm to about 7 cm in length. These centipedes can have as few as 31 pairs of legs (in the North American species E. cryptorobius, with as few as 31 in at least the males) or as many as 67 leg pairs (in the Central Asian species E. kusnetzowi, with as many as 67 in the females). The Russian species E. molodovae, which reaches only 14 mm in length, and the North American species E. paucipes, which measures only 14 mm in length, are both notable for their small sizes. The North American species E. missouriensis can reach 73 mm in length and is notable for its large size.

== Species ==
This genus includes the following species:

- Escaryus alatavicus Titova, 1972
- Escaryus chadaevae Titova, 1973
- Escaryus chichibuensis Shinohara, 1955
- Escaryus cryptorobius Pereira & Hoffman, 1993
- Escaryus dentatus Titova, 1973
- Escaryus ethopus (Chamberlin, 1920)
- Escaryus haasei (Sseliwanoff, 1884)
- Escaryus hirsutus Titova, 1973
- Escaryus igarashii Shinohara, 1955
- Escaryus jacoti Verhoeff, 1934
- Escaryus japonicus Attems, 1927
- Escaryus kirgizicus Titova, 1972
- Escaryus koreanus Takakuwa, 1937
- Escaryus krivolutskiji Titova, 1973
- Escaryus kusnetzowi Lignau, 1929
- Escaryus latzeli (Sseliwanoff, 1881)
- Escaryus liber Cook & Collins, 1891
- Escaryus makizimae Takakuwa, 1935
- Escaryus missouriensis Chamberlin, 1942
- Escaryus molodovae Titova, 1973
- Escaryus monticolens Chamberlin, 1947
- Escaryus oligopus Attems, 1904
- Escaryus orestes Pereira & Hoffman, 1993
- Escaryus ornatus Folkmanová, 1956
- Escaryus paucipes Chamberlin, 1946
- Escaryus perelae Titova, 1973
- Escaryus polygonatus Titova, 1973
- Escaryus retusidens Attems, 1904
- Escaryus sachalinus Takakuwa, 1935
- Escaryus sibiricus Cook, 1899
- Escaryus urbicus (Meinert, 1886)
- Escaryus vitimicus Titova, 1973
- Escaryus yacumoensis Takakuwa, 1935
