= Escaryus kirgizicus =

Scientific classification
- Kingdom: Animalia
- Phylum: Arthropoda
- Subphylum: Myriapoda
- Class: Chilopoda
- Order: Geophilomorpha
- Family: Schendylidae
- Genus: Escaryus
- Species: E. kirgizicus

Binomial name
- Escaryus kirgizicus Titova, 1973

Species of centipede

Escaryus kirgizicus is a species of soil centipede in the family Schendylidae. As the species name suggests, this centipede is found in Kyrgyzstan. This species is known only from high mountains and is notable for being found at one of the highest elevations (3,500 m) recorded for any centipede in the order Geophilomorpha in Central Asia.

== Discovery ==
This species was first described in 1973 by the Russian myriapodologist Lidia P. Titova. She based the original description of this species on five specimens (three females and two males). These specimens were found in alpine sedge meadows in the high mountain steppe (at an elevation of 3,500 m) of the inner Tian-Shan mountains in Kyrgyzstan.

== Description ==
This species features 39 or 41 pairs of legs in both sexes. This centipede is small, measuring only about 20 mm in length. The head is yellow, and the body is light yellow. The head is somewhat elongated. The posterior margin of the labrum features a relatively deep concave arch in the middle and 19 or 20 large denticles. The denticles in the middle of the labrum are blunt but the lateral denticles are pointed. One pair of lappets extend from the lateral margins of the telopodites of the first maxillae. The forcipules end in claws that are thin and sharp. Each article of the forcipule features a small tubercle. The sternites are long, with dense but short setae. The sternite of the ultimate leg-bearing segment has the shape of a wide trapezoid. The basal element of each of the ultimate legs features eight large pores. The ultimate legs end in claws that are as large as those at the distal ends of the preceding legs. The ultimate legs of the male are slightly thicker than those of the female. The telson features small anal pores.

This species shares many traits with other species in the genus Escaryus. For example, like other species in this genus, this species has an elongated head, denticles in the middle of the labrum, and lappets on the first maxillae. Furthermore, the ultimate legs in this species, like those of other species in this genus, end in claws, and these legs are thicker in the male than in the female.

Several other traits, however, distinguish this species from three other Escaryus species found in Kyrgyzstan: E. latzeli, E. oligopus, and E. retusidens. For example, anal pores are present in E. kirgizicus but absent in the other three species. Furthermore, whereas E. kirgizicus is only about 20 mm long and features only eight pores on each ultimate leg, the other three species reach larger sizes and feature more pores on their ultimate legs. The species E. latzeli features nine to twelve such pores, and the corresponding pores on E. oligopus and E. retusidens are even more numerous. Moreover, whereas E. kirgizicus features 39 or 41 leg pairs, E. oligopus can have fewer leg pairs (with as few as 35), E. latzeli can have more (with 41 or 43), and E. retusidens features many more (with 47 to 55).
