= Pachymerinus =

Scientific classification
- Kingdom: Animalia
- Phylum: Arthropoda
- Subphylum: Myriapoda
- Class: Chilopoda
- Order: Geophilomorpha
- Family: Geophilidae
- Genus: Pachymerinus; Silvestri, 1905

Type species
- Geophilus millepunctatus Gervais, 1847

Genus of centipedes

Pachymerinus is a genus of centipedes in the family Geophilidae. It was described by Italian entomologist Filippo Silvestri in 1905. Centipedes in this genus feature elongate heads, elongate forcipules with denticles, scattered coxal pores, and few sternal pores, if any; the intermediate part of the labrum is narrow and has no denticles. These centipedes range from about 3 cm to 8 cm in length, have 47 to 81 pairs of legs, and are found in Chile and southeast Australia. The Australian species Pachymerinus froggatti is notable for its relatively small size, measuring only 28 mm in length. The larger Chilean species P. porteri measures 46 mm in length but can have as few as 47 leg pairs (47 to 49 in males, 47 to 51 in females), the minimum number recorded in this genus. The Chilean species P. pluripes measures only 32 mm in length but can have 79 or 81 leg pairs, the maximum number recorded in this genus. The Chilean species P. canaliculatus is known from a female specimen with 75 leg pairs and is notable for its large size, measuring 75 mm in length.

== Species ==
Valid species:

- Pachymerinus abbreviates Silvestri, 1905
- Pachymerinus australis Chamberlin, 1920
- Pachymerinus canaliculatus (Gervais, 1849)
- Pachymerinus froggatti Brolemann, 1912
- Pachymerinus millepunctatus (Gervais, 1847)
- Pachymerinus multiporus Demange, 1963
- Pachymerinus pluripes (Silvestri, 1899)
- Pachymerinus porteri (Silvestri, 1899)
