= Mecistocephalus ongi =

Scientific classification
- Kingdom: Animalia
- Phylum: Arthropoda
- Subphylum: Myriapoda
- Class: Chilopoda
- Order: Geophilomorpha
- Family: Mecistocephalidae
- Genus: Mecistocephalus
- Species: M. ongi

Binomial name
- Mecistocephalus ongi Takakuwa, 1934

Species of centipede

Mecistocephalus ongi is a species of soil centipede in the Mecistocephalidae family. This centipede is found in Taiwan, the Bonin Islands of Japan, and Micronesia. This species features 49 pairs of legs and can reach 30 mm in length.

== Discovery ==
This species was first described in 1934 by the Japanese myriapodologist Yosioki Takakuwa. He based the original description of this species on syntypes including at least one adult male. These type specimens were found in Tainan on the island of Taiwan. These syntypes are now apparently lost.

== Description ==
This species features 49 leg-bearing segments and can reach at least 30 mm in length. The body is yellow without dark patches, but the head and forcipular segment are a dark reddish brown. The head is 1.7 times longer than wide. Spicula project from the pleurites on the side of the head (buccae). The buccae feature setae only on the posterior half. The areolate part of the clypeus is about two or three times longer than the smooth areas in the posterior part (plagulae). This areolate area contains no smooth islands but features about 10 setae on each side. The plagulae do not feature any setae or pore-like sensilla. The posterior margin of each side piece of the labrum is smooth, slightly concave in the middle, and convex at each end. The middle piece is narrow, with parallel lateral margins but pointed at the posterior end. The mandible features about five fully developed lamellae, with about seven pointed teeth on the first lamella and about ten teeth on the average middle lamella. Each of the second maxillae features a small but distinct claw.

The forcipules feature two teeth of similar size on the first article and a small tooth on each of the next two articles. The sternites feature a groove that is forked with a right angle between the branches. The sternum of the last leg-bearing segment is shaped like a triangle that is about as long as wide, but with a rounded posterior margin and dense setae at the posterior end. The basal element of each of the ultimate legs features about 13 or 14 large pores.

This species exhibits many traits that characterize the genus Mecistocephalus. For example, like other species in this genus, this species features a head evidently longer than wide, spicula and setae on the buccae, claws on the second maxillae, and a groove on the sternites of the trunk segments. Furthermore, like most species in this genus, this species features 49 leg pairs. Moreover, like many species in this genus, this species features two teeth on the first article of the forcipule.

This species shares more distinctive traits with another species in the same genus, M. brevisternalis, which is found in Micronesia. For example, in each of these species, the areolate part of the clypeus is two to three times as long as the plagulae, features 10 setae on each side, and does not contain any smooth islands. Furthermore, each of these species features a head that is less than twice as long as wide, plagulae without pore-like sensilla, two teeth of similar size on the first article of the forcipule, and a forked groove on the trunk sternites.

The species M. ongi can be distinguished from M. brevisternalis, however, based on other traits. In particular, the sternum of the last leg-bearing segment is unusually short in M. brevisternalis, about twice as wide as long, but in M. ongi, this sternum is about as long as wide. Furthermore, the head is more elongate in M. ongi, with a length/width ratio of 1.7, whereas the head is relatively short in M. brevisternalis, with a length/width ratio of only 1.5.

== Distribution ==
The species M. ongi is found not only in Taiwan but also in Micronesia and on the Ogasawara Islands of Japan. In Taiwan, this species has been recorded not only at the type locality of Tainan but also at several other sites, including the city of Chiayi, the township of Xizhou, and the Shilin District of the city of Taipei. In the Ogasawara Islands, this species has been recorded on the island of Chichijima.
