= Guy Collins =

Guy Collins may refer to:

- Guy N. Collins, American botanist
- Guy Collins, producer of Raised By Zombies
- Guy Collins, golfer, runner-up in 1973 Trans-Mississippi Amateur
