= Pachymerellus zygethus =

Scientific classification
- Kingdom: Animalia
- Phylum: Arthropoda
- Subphylum: Myriapoda
- Class: Chilopoda
- Order: Geophilomorpha
- Family: Geophilidae
- Genus: Pachymerellus
- Species: P. zygethus

Binomial name
- Pachymerellus zygethus Chamberlin, 1920

Species of centipede

Pachymerellus zygethus is a species of centipede in the Geophilidae family. It is endemic to Australia and New Zealand, and was first described in 1920 by American biologist Ralph Vary Chamberlin.

== Description ==
This species features small denticles on the forcipular coxosternite and tarsungula, no sternal pores, and scattered coxal pores; the second maxillae have claws with small filaments. The original description of this species is based on a specimen measuring about 35 mm in length with 55 pairs of legs, but the number of segments in this species can range from as few as 47 to as many as 65.

== Distribution ==
The species occurs in Tasmania and New Zealand.

== Behaviour ==
The centipedes are solitary terrestrial predators that inhabit plant litter, soil and rotting wood.
