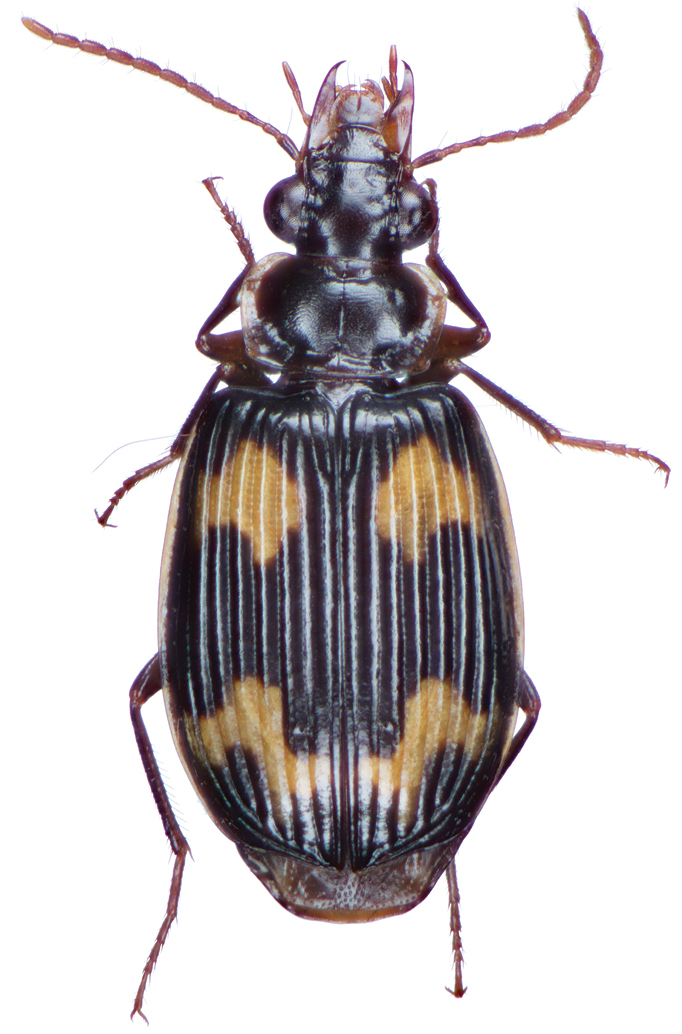

Scientific classification
- Kingdom: Animalia
- Phylum: Arthropoda
- Class: Insecta
- Order: Coleoptera
- Suborder: Adephaga
- Family: Carabidae
- Genus: Coptodera
- Species: C. occulta

Binomial name
- Coptodera occulta Hunting & Yang, 2019

Synonyms
- Coptodera (Coptoderina) occulta Hunting & Yang, 2019; Coptodera (Coptodera) occulta Hunting & Yang, 2019

= Coptodera occulta =

Species of beetle

Coptodera occulta is a species of ground beetle in the subfamily Lebiinae. It is endemic to Taiwan.

== Description ==
Coptodera occulta measure 7.3–8.7 mm (0.29–0.34 in) in body length. The head is rufo-piceous to piceous. The clypeus and labrum are brunneo-piceous to piceous with testaceous to brunneo-testaceous lateral margins. The pronotum is rufo-brunneous to rufo-piceous with lighter, brunneo-testaceous to rufo-brunneous margins. The elytra are black. There are two pairs of testaceous markings.

Coptodera occulta is most similar to C. japonica from Japan, Korea, and Taiwan, but has testaceous margins of the pronotum (rather than black or just slightly lighter margins in C. japonica) and the almost straight elytral apex.

== Habitat ==
Adults occur in mixed forest of montane areas at elevations between 200 and 640 m (660 and 2,100 ft). Specimens have been collected in March–September. Little is known about the ecology of this species.
