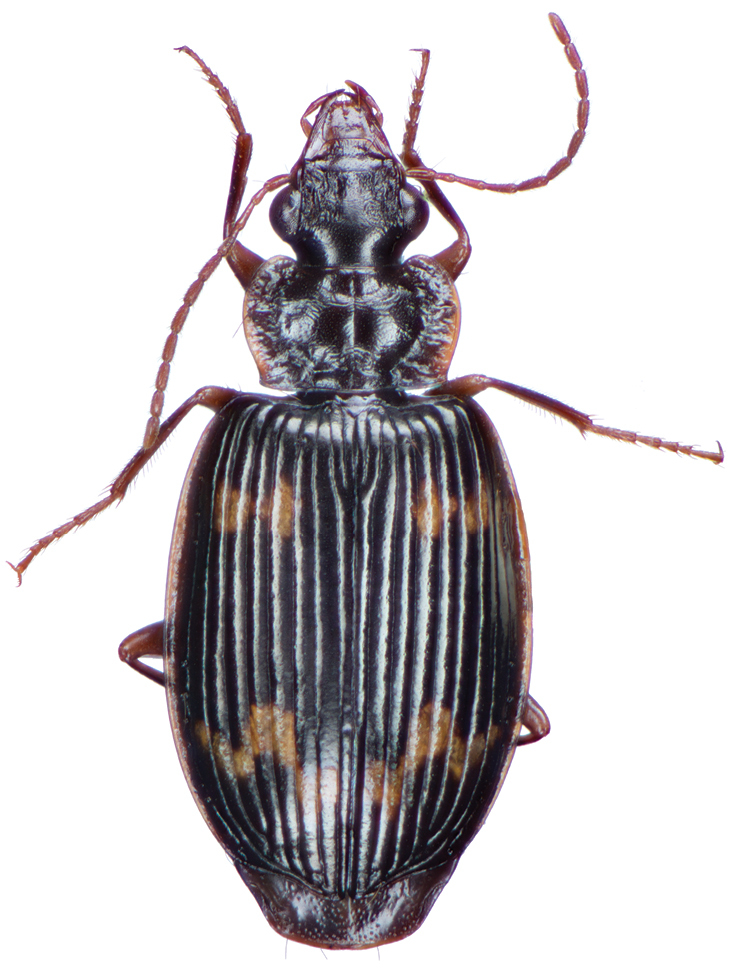

Scientific classification
- Kingdom: Animalia
- Phylum: Arthropoda
- Class: Insecta
- Order: Coleoptera
- Suborder: Adephaga
- Family: Carabidae
- Genus: Coptodera
- Species: C. proksi

Binomial name
- Coptodera proksi Jedlička, 1963

Synonyms
- Coptoderina proksi (Jedlička, 1963); Coptodera (Coptoderina) proksi Jedlička

= Coptodera proksi =

Species of beetle

Coptodera proksi is a species of ground beetle in the subfamily Lebiinae. It is endemic to Taiwan.

== Description ==
Coptodera proksi measure 6.7–8.5 mm (0.26–0.33 in) in body length. The head is rufo-piceous to piceous. The clypeus and labrum are rufo-brunneous to rufo-piceous, lighter than head. The pronotum is rufo-piceous to piceous with somewhat lighter, rufous to rufo-piceous lateral margins. The elytra are black. There are four testaceous to rufo-testaceous markings.

== Habitat ==
Adults occur in mixed forest of montane areas, mostly at elevations of 1,400–2,095 m (4,593–6,873 ft) above sea level, rarely lower. They are crepuscular and found on both trunks of live trees and recently dead or dying trees as night. Specimens have been collected in May–September.
