= Mecistocephalus brevisternalis =

Scientific classification
- Kingdom: Animalia
- Phylum: Arthropoda
- Subphylum: Myriapoda
- Class: Chilopoda
- Order: Geophilomorpha
- Family: Mecistocephalidae
- Genus: Mecistocephalus
- Species: M. brevisternalis

Binomial name
- Mecistocephalus brevisternalis Takakuwa, 1934

Species of centipede

Mecistocephalus brevisternalis is a species of soil centipede in the Mecistocephalidae family. This centipede is found in the Marshall Islands in Micronesia. This species features 49 pairs of legs and can reach 30 mm in length.

== Discovery ==
This species was first described in 1934 by the Japanese myriapodologist Yosioki Takakuwa. He based the original description of this species on syntypes including at least one adult male. These type specimens were found on the Jaluit Atoll in the Marshall Islands. These syntypes are now apparently lost.

== Description ==
This species features 49 leg-bearing segments and can reach at least 30 mm in length. The body is yellow without dark patches, but the head and forcipular segment are a darker reddish brown. The head is 1.5 times longer than wide. Spicula project from the pleurites on the side of the head (buccae). The buccae feature setae only on the posterior half. The areolate part of the clypeus is about 2.5 to 3 times longer than the smooth areas in the posterior part (plagulae). This areolate area contains no smooth islands but features about 10 setae on each side. The plagulae do not feature any setae or pore-like sensilla. The anterior sclerites of the side pieces of the labrum are shaped like triangles with the inner margin adjacent to the middle piece reduced to a vertex. The posterior margins of the side pieces of the labrum are smooth but extend into a small beak adjacent to the middle piece. The mandible features about six fully developed lamellae, with six teeth on the first lamella and 10 to 17 teeth on the average middle lamella.

The forcipules feature two similar teeth on the first article and a tubercle on each of the next two articles, but no teeth on the most distal article. The first pair of legs are only half as long as the second pair. The sternites feature a groove that is forked with a right angle between the branches. The sternum of the last leg-bearing segment is triangular and short, about twice as wide and long. The basal element of each of the ultimate legs features about 10 large pores.

This species exhibits many traits that characterize the genus Mecistocephalus. For example, like other species in this genus, this species features a head evidently longer than wide, spicula and setae on the buccae, and a groove on the sternites of the trunk segments. Furthermore, like most species in this genus, this species features 49 leg pairs. Moreover, like many species in this genus, this species features two teeth on the first article of the forcipule.

This species shares more distinctive traits with another species in the same genus, M. ongi, which is also found in Micronesia. For example, in each of these species, the areolate part of the clypeus is two to three times as long as the plagulae, features 10 setae on each side, and does not contain any smooth islands. Furthermore, each of these species features a head that is less than twice as long as wide, plagulae without pore-like sensilla, two teeth of similar size on the first article of the forcipule, and a forked groove on the trunk sternites.

The species M. brevisternalis can be distinguished from M. ongi, however, based on other traits. In particular, the sternum of the last leg-bearing segment is unusually short in M. brevisternalis, about twice as wide as long, but in M. ongi, this sternum is about as long as wide. Furthermore, the head is more elongate in M. ongi, with a length/width ratio of 1.7, whereas the head is relatively short in M. brevisternalis, with a length/width ratio of only 1.5.

== Distribution ==
The species M. brevisternalis is found in the Marshall Islands. In 1938, Takakuwa reported finding this species in Taiwan, but authorities express some doubts about this report, given the distance between Taiwan and the type locality. The presence of this centipede in Taiwan has not been confirmed.
