= Harpalus chalcentus =

Scientific classification
- Kingdom: Animalia
- Phylum: Arthropoda
- Class: Insecta
- Order: Coleoptera
- Suborder: Adephaga
- Family: Carabidae
- Genus: Harpalus
- Species: H. chalcentus

Binomial name
- Harpalus chalcentus Bates, 1873

Synonyms
- Harpalus angulatoides Puel, 1935; Harpalus bosphoranus Reiche, 1862; Harpalus fugax Faldermann, 1836

Species of beetle

Harpalus chalcentus is a species of ground beetle native to Asia. It is found in Japan and northeastern China. It is also found in North and South Korea.

== Description ==
The species is 11.2–14.4 millimetres (0.44–0.57 in) in length, is black coloured and shiny. Its head and prothorax is kindoff metallic and greenish in colour. Its pronotum and posterior is reddish in colour. The species femora, labrum, mandibles, tibiae and ventral side is black, while pedipalp, antennae and tarsus is brownish-red. Its wings are developed.
