= Komarovka =

Komarovka (Russian: Комаровка) is the name of several rural localities in Russia:

- Komarovka, Astrakhan Oblast, a rural locality (a selo) in Nikolo-Komarovsky Selsoviet, Kamyzyaksky District, Astrakhan Oblast
- Komarovka, Konyshyovsky District, Kursk Oblast, a rural locality (a khutor) in Platavsky Selsoviet Rural Settlement, Konyshyovsky District, Kursk Oblast
- Komarovka, Samara Oblast, a selo in Shigonsky District, Samara Oblast
