= Coptodera festiva =

Scientific classification
- Kingdom: Animalia
- Phylum: Arthropoda
- Class: Insecta
- Order: Coleoptera
- Suborder: Adephaga
- Family: Carabidae
- Genus: Coptodera
- Species: C. festiva

Binomial name
- Coptodera festiva Dejean, 1825

Species of beetle

Coptodera festiva is a species of ground beetle in the family Carabidae. It is found in North America, South America and the Caribbean.
