= Pachymerellus =

Scientific classification
- Kingdom: Animalia
- Phylum: Arthropoda
- Subphylum: Myriapoda
- Class: Chilopoda
- Order: Geophilomorpha
- Family: Geophilidae
- Genus: Pachymerellus; Chamberlin, 1920

Type species
- Pachymerellus zygethus Chamberlin,1920

Genus of centipedes

Pachymerellus is a genus of two species of centipedes, in the family Geophilidae. It was described by American biologist Ralph Vary Chamberlin in 1920. The smaller Mexican species, Pachymerellus dentifer, measures only 16 mm in length and has only 43 pairs of legs, whereas the larger species, P. zygethus, measures 33 mm in length and can have from 47 to 65 leg pairs.

== Species ==
Valid species:

- Pachymerellus dentifer (Chamberlin, 1943)
- Pachymerellus zygethus Chamberlin, 1920
