= Coptodera championi =

Scientific classification
- Domain: Eukaryota
- Kingdom: Animalia
- Phylum: Arthropoda
- Class: Insecta
- Order: Coleoptera
- Suborder: Adephaga
- Family: Carabidae
- Genus: Coptodera
- Species: C. championi

Binomial name
- Coptodera championi Bates, 1883

Species of beetle

Coptodera championi is a ground beetle in the subfamily Lebiinae. It is known from Colombia, Panama, and Nicaragua.

== Description ==
Males measure 7.3–8.9 mm (0.29–0.35 in) and females 6.8–8.8 mm (0.27–0.35 in) in body length. The head and pronotum are metallic green. The elytra are rufo-piceous to piceous and have greenish luster and testaceous markings. The lateral margins of pronotum and elytra have cyaneous luster.
