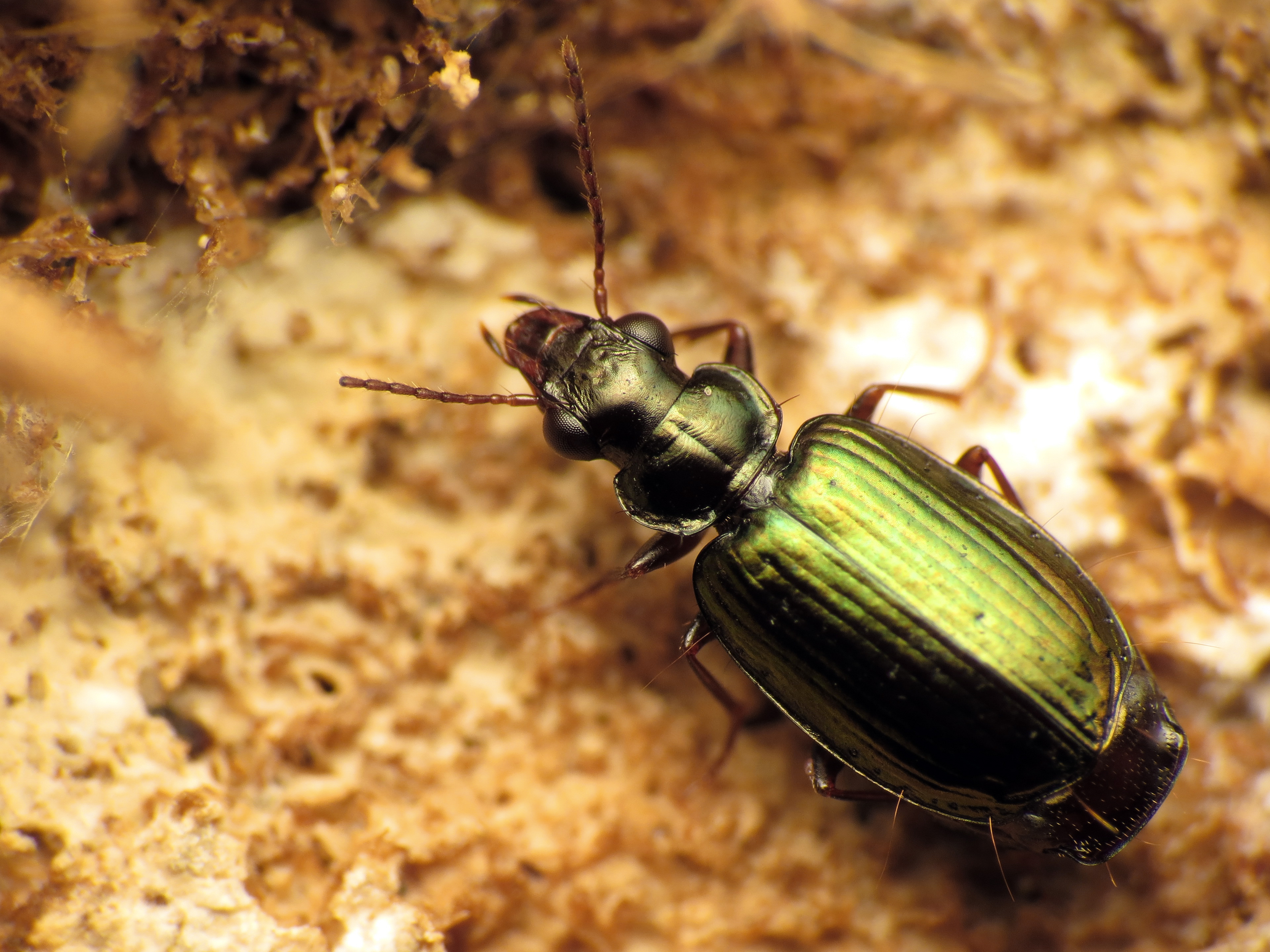

Scientific classification
- Kingdom: Animalia
- Phylum: Arthropoda
- Class: Insecta
- Order: Coleoptera
- Suborder: Adephaga
- Family: Carabidae
- Genus: Coptodera
- Species: C. aerata

Binomial name
- Coptodera aerata Dejean, 1825

= Coptodera aerata =

Species of beetle

Coptodera aerata is a species of ground beetle in the family Carabidae. It is found in North America.

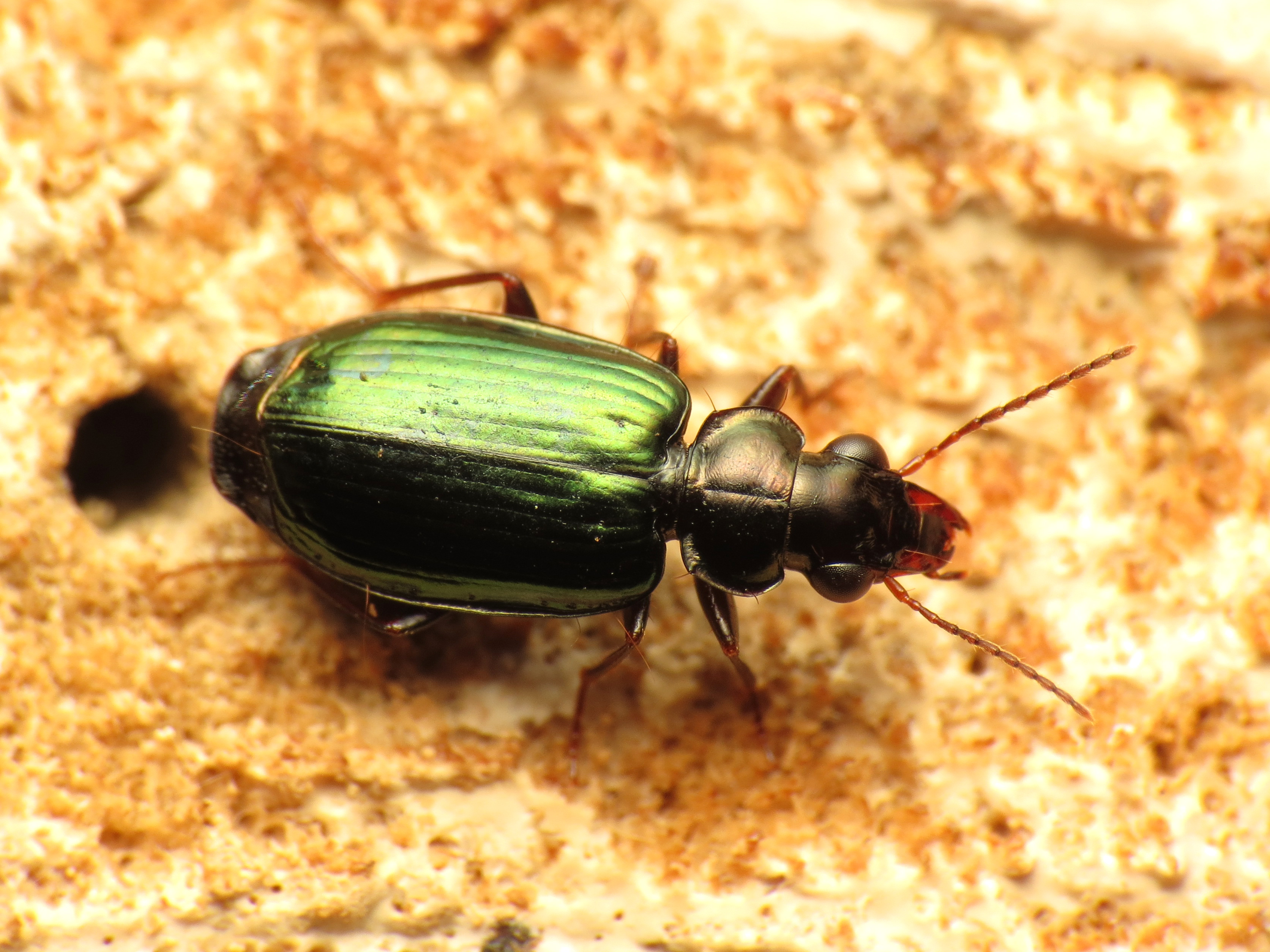
