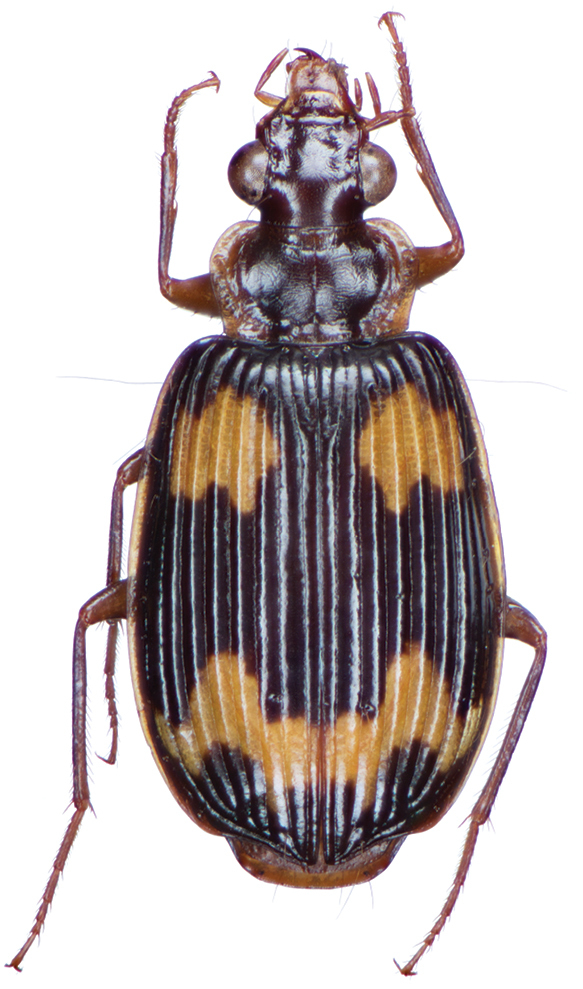

Scientific classification
- Kingdom: Animalia
- Phylum: Arthropoda
- Clade: Pancrustacea
- Class: Insecta
- Order: Coleoptera
- Suborder: Adephaga
- Family: Carabidae
- Genus: Coptodera
- Species: C. maculata

Binomial name
- Coptodera maculata Dupuis, 1912

Synonyms
- Coptodera formosana var. maculata Dupuis, 1912 (basionym); Coptodera (Coptoderina) maculata Dupuis, 1912

= Coptodera maculata =

Species of beetle

Coptodera maculata is a species of ground beetle in the subfamily Lebiinae. It is endemic to Taiwan.

== Description ==
Coptodera maculata measure 6.1–6.7 mm (0.24–0.26 in) in body length. The head and clypeus are brunneous to rufo-piceous. The pronotum is rufo-piceous with clearly lighter, testaceous to rufo-brunneous lateral margins. The elytra are black. There are two pairs of testaceous markings.

== Habitat ==
Adults occur in mixed forest of montane areas at elevations between 100 and 950 m (330 and 3,120 ft). Specimens have been collected in January–September. Little is known about the ecology of this species.
