= Pachymerinus australis =

Scientific classification
- Kingdom: Animalia
- Phylum: Arthropoda
- Subphylum: Myriapoda
- Class: Chilopoda
- Order: Geophilomorpha
- Family: Geophilidae
- Genus: Pachymerinus
- Species: P. australis

Binomial name
- Pachymerinus australis Chamberlin, 1920

Species of centipede

Pachymerinus australis is a species of centipede in the Geophilidae family. It is endemic to Australia, and was first described in 1920 by American biologist Ralph Vary Chamberlin.

== Description ==
The original description of this species is based on a specimen measuring 45 mm in length with 71 pairs of legs.

== Distribution ==
The species occurs in New South Wales.

== Behaviour ==
The centipedes are solitary terrestrial predators that inhabit plant litter, soil and rotting wood.
