= Sikhote-Alin Nature Reserve =

Strict nature reserve in Primorsky Krai, Russia

- Russian: Сихотэ-Алинский заповедник, Sikhote-Alinsky Zapovednik
- IUCN category Ia (strict nature reserve)
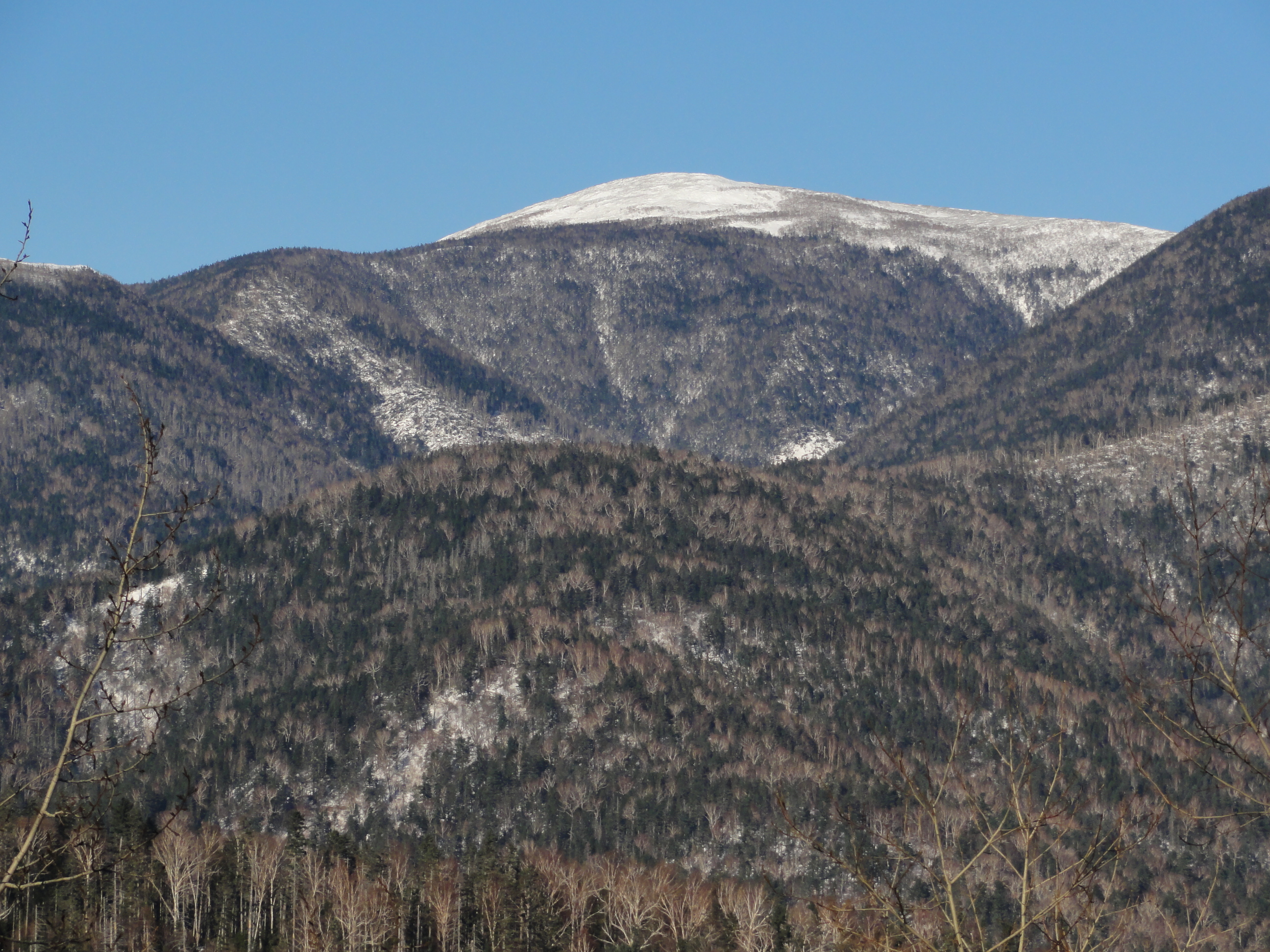
- Glukhomanka Mountain, in Sikhote-Alin Nature Reserve

- Location within Russia
- Location: Primorsky Krai, Russia
- Nearest city: Dalnegorsk
- Coordinates: 45°02′N 136°20′E
- Area: 4,016 km^{2} (1,551 sq mi)
- Established: February 10, 1935
- Website: сиалинь.рф

Sikhote-Alin Nature Reserve (Russian pronunciation: [sʲɪxɐˈtɛ ɐˈlʲinʲ], English: /ˈsiːkəˌteɪ əˈliːn/, SEE-kə-TAY ə-LEEN) is a Russian 'zapovednik' (strict nature reserve) in Primorsky Krai. It is a reserve for the endangered Siberian tiger.

It was founded on February 10, 1935, to protect a population of the sable. The Sikhote-Alin Nature Reserve is located in a watershed on the eastern slopes of Central Sikhote-Alin in the Terneysky and Krasnoarmeysky Districts and the area of Dalnegorsk City Council.

The area of the zapovednik is 401,428 ha (2,900 ha - aquatic).

Map of Sikhote-Alin Nature Reserve

Hunting and fishing in Sikhote-Alin Nature Reserve are forbidden.

The reserve is featured in the 1999 documentary titled In The Shadow Of The Tiger. Along with Ussurisky Nature Reserve, it is also featured in the natural film Operation Snow Tiger by the BBC, which initially aired in 2013.
