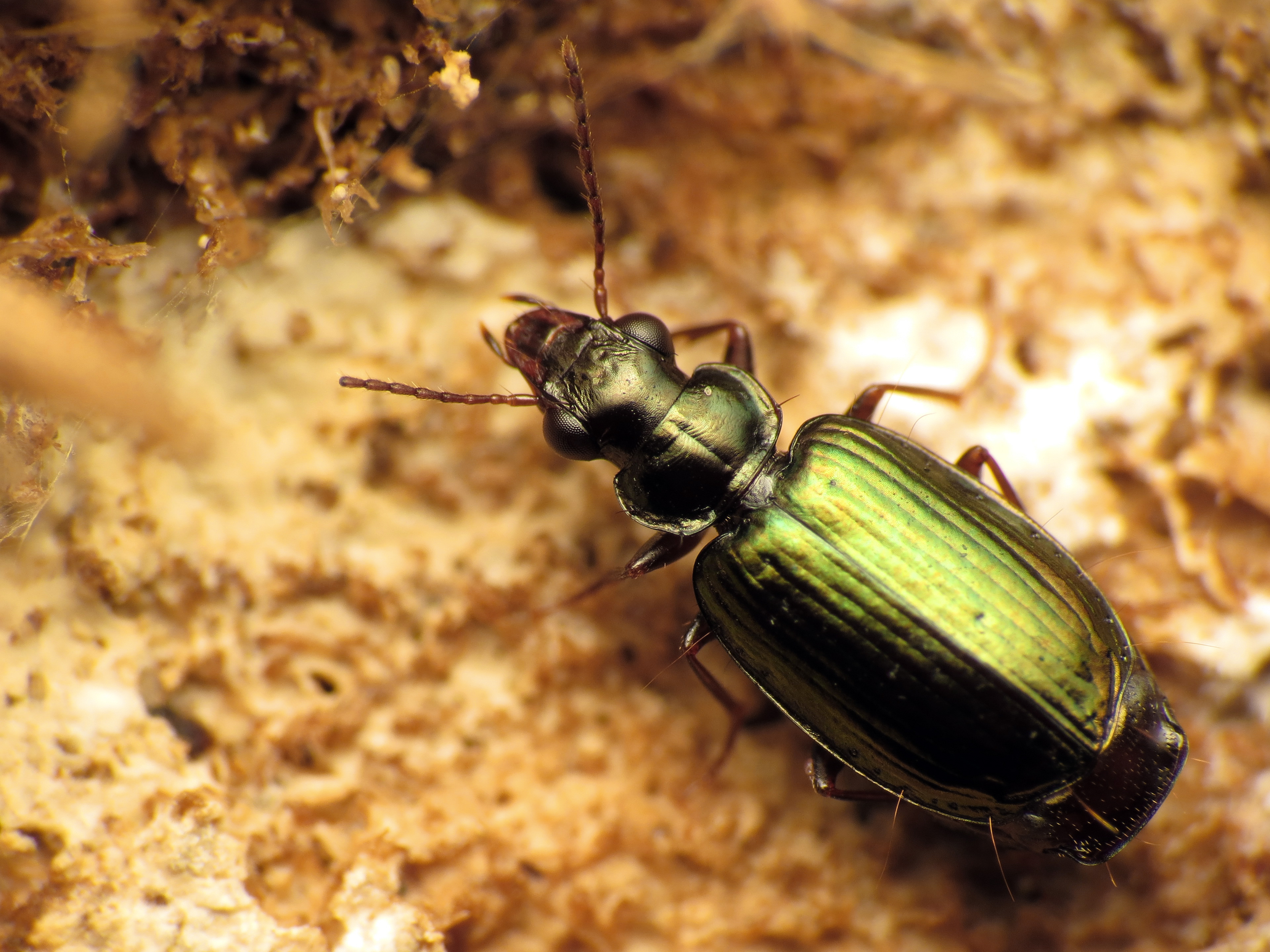

Scientific classification
- Kingdom: Animalia
- Phylum: Arthropoda
- Class: Insecta
- Order: Coleoptera
- Suborder: Adephaga
- Family: Carabidae
- Subfamily: Lebiinae
- Tribe: Lebiini
- Genus: Coptodera; Dejean, 1825

Subgenera
- Coptodera Dejean, 1825; Coptoderina Jeannel, 1949; Coptoderinella Hansen, 1968; Haplocrepis Jeannel, 1949

= Coptodera =

Coptodera Temporal range: Eocene–Recent

Genus of beetles

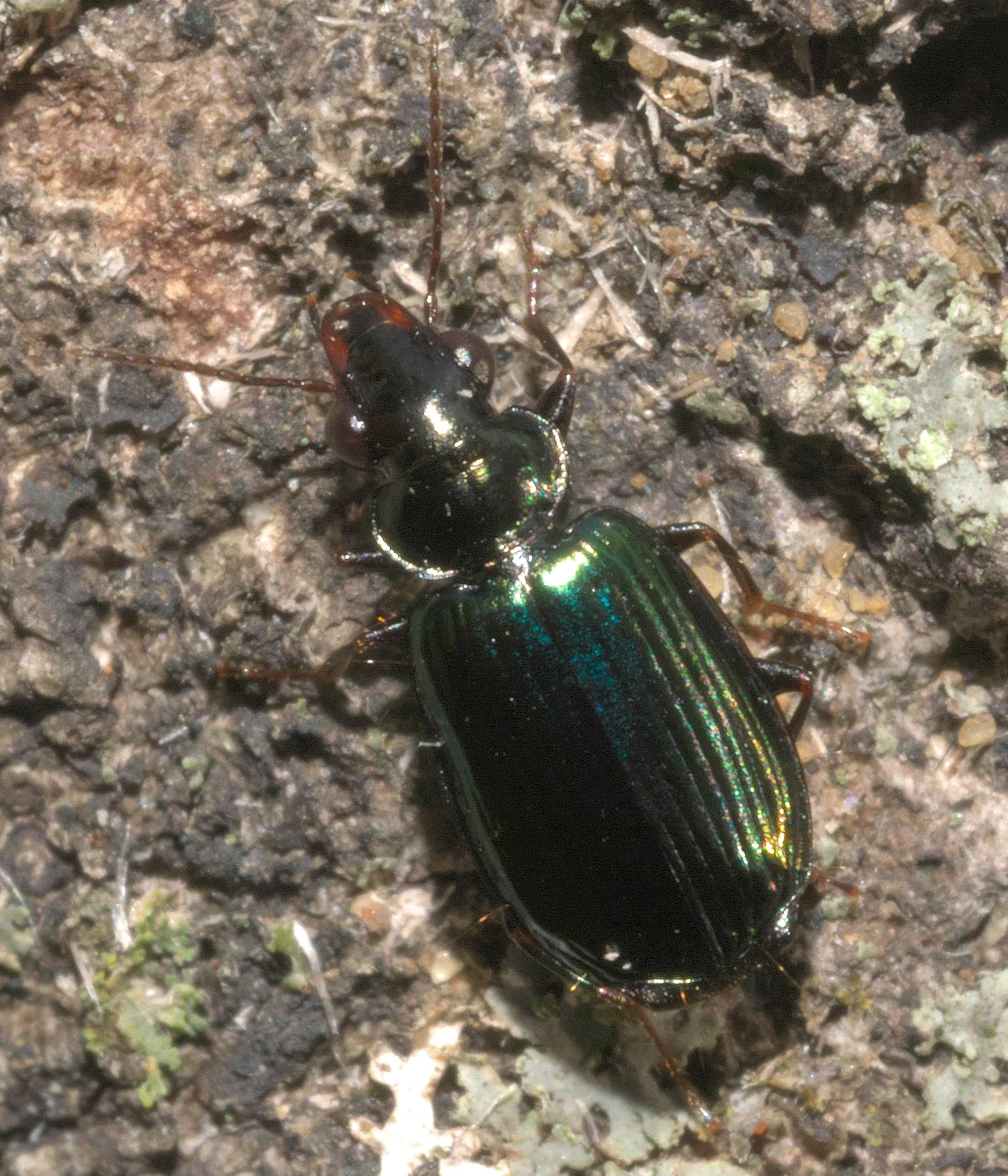
Coptodera aerata, Oklahoma

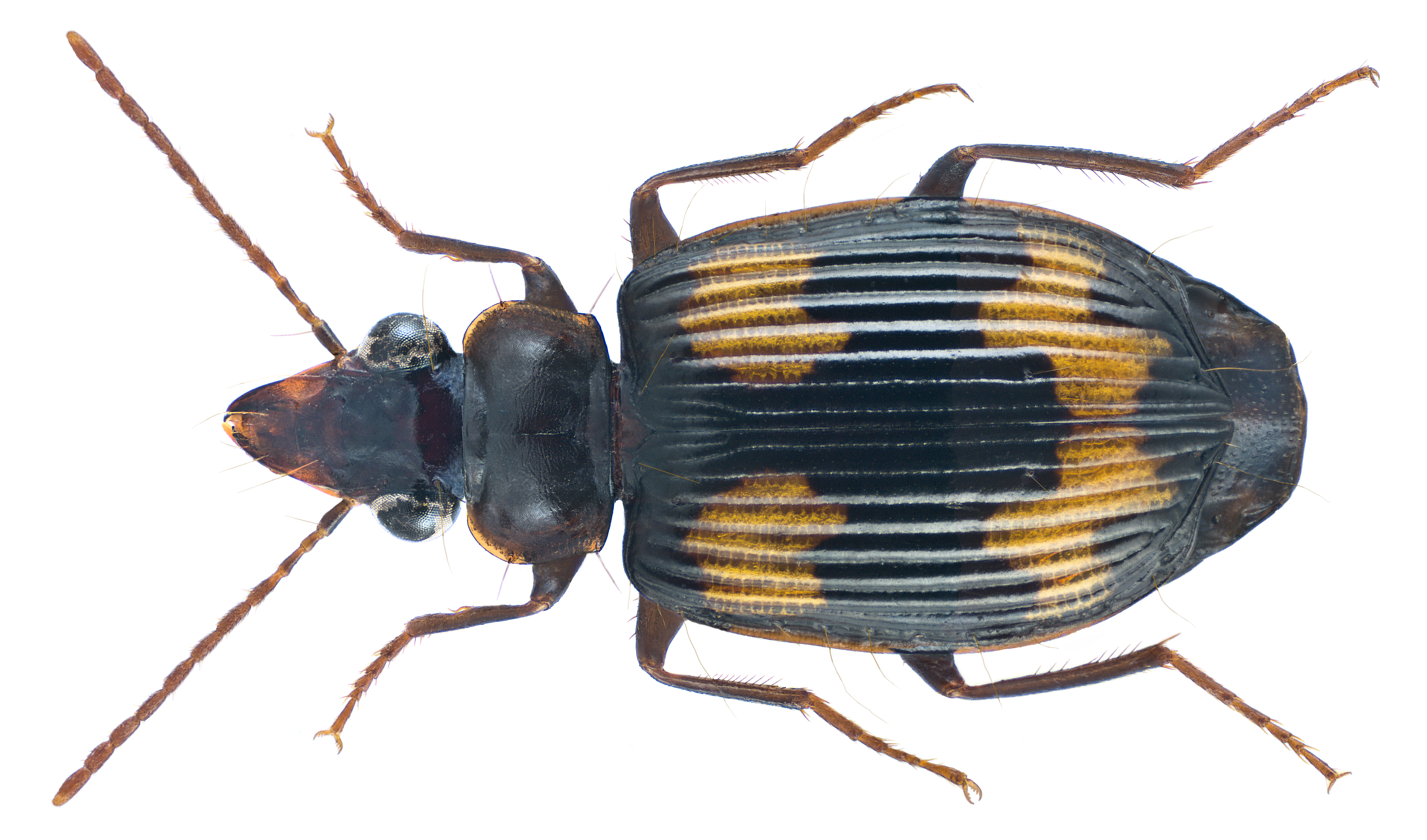
Coptodera interrupta

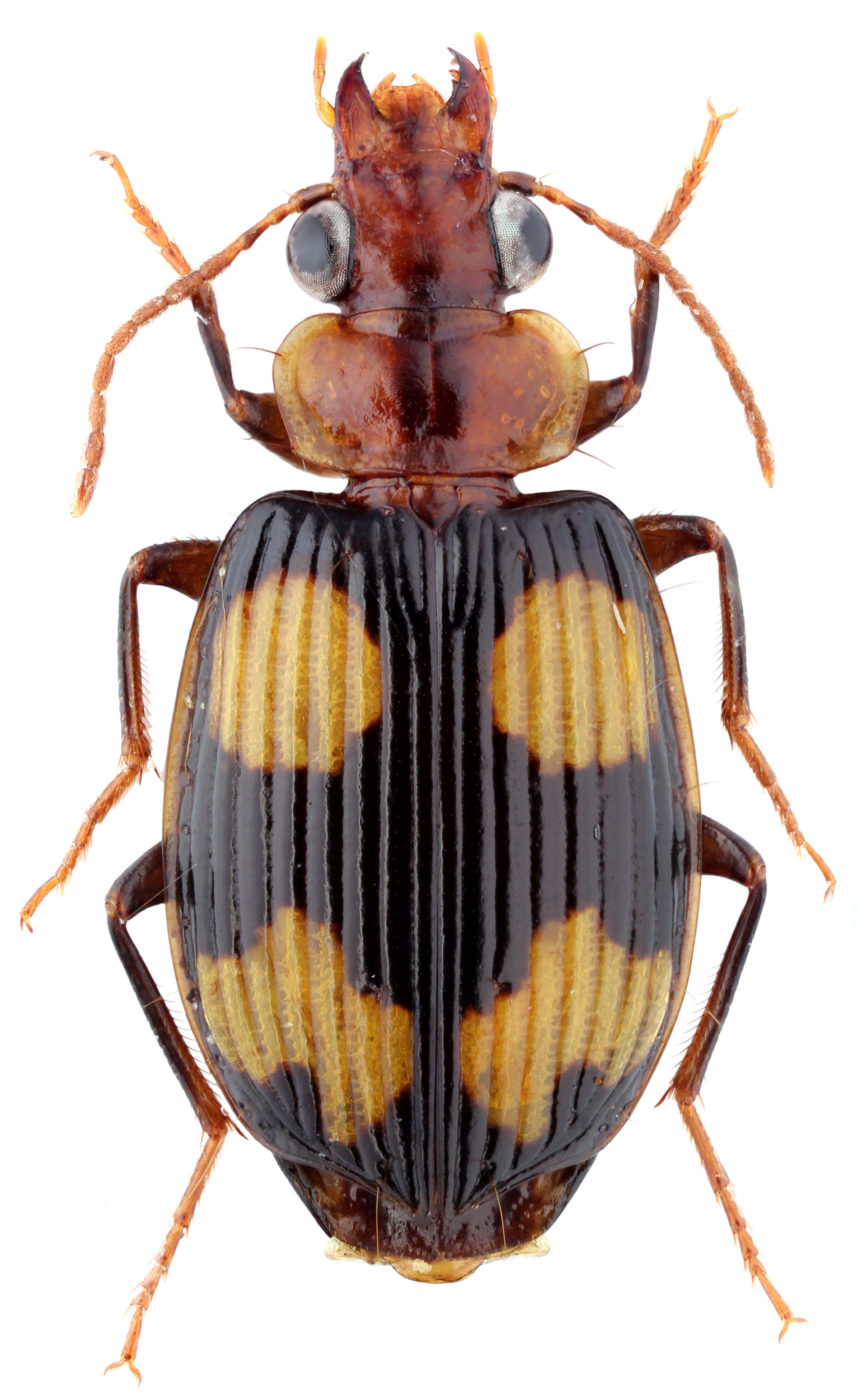

Coptodera is a genus of beetles in the family Carabidae, constituted of 105 species distributed across North and South America, Africa, Oceania and eastern Asia.

They are small flattened beetles. The body size is usually under 11 mm and pronotum is generally wider than long. Many of them present patches or spots of different colours on the elytra.

A single fossil species of this genus has been described: Coptodera elektra, from Europe's Eocene, was described in 2015 from a single piece of Baltic amber.

It contains the following species:

- Coptodera acutipennis (Buquet, 1835) (Mexico, Central and South America)
- Coptodera aeneorufa Bates, 1869 (South America)
- Coptodera aerata Dejean, 1825 (North America)
- Coptodera alluaudi (Jeannel, 1949) (Madagascar)
- Coptodera alticola Baehr, 2007 (Australia)
- Coptodera amoenula Boheman, 1848 (Africa)
- Coptodera andrewesi Jedlicka, 1934 (Philippines)
- Coptodera apicalis Shpeley & Ball, 1993 (Colombia and Ecuador)
- Coptodera aurata Chevrolat, 1835 (Guatemala and Mexico)
- Coptodera australis Chaudoir, 1870 (Australia)
- Coptodera banjaran Kirschenhofer, 2014 (Borneo, Indonesia, and Malaysia)
- Coptodera banjaranensis Kirschenhofer, 2012 (Malaysia)
- Coptodera basilewskyi (Hansen, 1968) (Africa)
- Coptodera bastai Baehr, 2014 (Indonesia)
- Coptodera baumi Jedlicka, 1955 (Malaysia)
- Coptodera bifasciata Putzeys, 1845 (South America)
- Coptodera braziliensis Shpeley & Ball, 1993 (Brazil)
- Coptodera brunnea Shpeley & Ball, 1993 (North and Central America)
- Coptodera catalai (Jeannel, 1949) (Madagascar)
- Coptodera cechovskyi Kirschenhofer, 2010 (Malaysia)
- Coptodera chalcites Bates, 1869 (Brazil, Ecuador, and Peru)
- Coptodera championi Bates, 1883 (Colombia, Nicaragua, and Panama)
- Coptodera chaudoiri Andrewes, 1919 (Asia, Oceania)
- Coptodera confusa (Hansen, 1968) (Africa)
- Coptodera congoana Burgeon, 1937 (Africa)
- Coptodera congoensis Burgeon, 1937 (Africa)
- Coptodera consobrina (Hansen, 1968) (Democratic Republic of the Congo)
- Coptodera crockerensis Kirschenhofer, 2014 (Borneo, Indonesia, and Malaysia)
- Coptodera cupreotincta Bates, 1869 (Central and South America)
- Coptodera cyanella Bates, 1869 (Borneo, Indonesia, and New Guinea)
- Coptodera dromioides (Bates, 1869) (South America)
- Coptodera elongata Putzeys, 1845 (Mexico, Central and South America)
- Coptodera eluta Andrewes, 1923 (Indomalaya, temperate Asia)
- Coptodera emarginata Dejean, 1825 (Brazil)
- Coptodera equestris Boheman, 1848 (Africa)
- Coptodera erwini Shpeley & Ball, 1993 (Peru)
- Coptodera esakii (Nakane, 1956) (Japan)
- Coptodera farai Jedlicka, 1964 (China)
- Coptodera fasciata Boheman, 1848 (South Africa)
- Coptodera fasciolata (W.J.MacLeay, 1887) (Australia)
- Coptodera festiva Dejean, 1825 (North, Central, and South America)
- Coptodera flavipes Louwerens, 1953 (Indonesia)
- Coptodera flexuosa Schmidt-Goebel, 1846 (Indomalaya and temperate Asia)
- Coptodera foveolata Shpeley & Ball, 1993 (Mexico)
- Coptodera fulminans (Bates, 1869) (Brazil)
- Coptodera grossa Darlington, 1968 (New Guinea)
- Coptodera hieroglyphica Fauvel, 1882 (New Caledonia)
- Coptodera hova Alluaud, 1936 (Madagascar)
- Coptodera immaculata (Mateu, 1970) (Madagascar)
- Coptodera impicta Chaudoir, 1870 (Indonesia)
- Coptodera indica (Kirschenhofer, 2010) (India)
- Coptodera interrupta Schmidt-Goebel, 1846 (Asia)
- Coptodera intrusa Hansen, 1968 (Africa)
- Coptodera japonica Bates, 1883 (temperate Asia)
- Coptodera jimnae Baehr, 2007 (Australia)
- Coptodera johorensis Kirschenhofer, 2010 (Malaysia)
- Coptodera kelabitensis Kirschenhofer, 2012 (Borneo, Indonesia, and Malaysia)
- Coptodera lamingtonensis Baehr, 2007 (Australia)
- Coptodera laticollis (LaFerté-Sénectère, 1849) (Africa)
- Coptodera legorskyi Kirschenhofer, 2012 (India)
- Coptodera levrati (Montrouzier, 1864) (New Caledonia)
- Coptodera lineata (Bates, 1883) (Mexico, Central and South America)
- Coptodera lineatocollis Burgeon, 1937 (Africa)
- Coptodera lineolata Bates, 1869 (Indonesia and New Guinea)
- Coptodera luzonensis Jedlicka, 1934 (Philippines)
- Coptodera maculata Dupuis, 1912 (Taiwan and temperate Asia)
- Coptodera maculosa Kirschenhofer, 2012 (Sri Lanka)
- Coptodera marginata Dupuis, 1912 (Japan, Taiwan, and temperate Asia)
- Coptodera mastersii (W.J.MacLeay, 1871) (Australia)
- Coptodera maynei Burgeon, 1937 (Democratic Republic of the Congo)
- Coptodera megalops Bates, 1869 (South America)
- Coptodera mersingensis Kirschenhofer, 2010 (Malaysia)
- Coptodera monteithi Baehr, 2007 (Australia)
- Coptodera montisferrei Baehr, 2007 (Australia)
- Coptodera nigrosignata (Chaudoir, 1870) (Brazil)
- Coptodera nigrostriata (Reiche, 1843) (Central and South America)
- Coptodera nigroviridis Shpeley & Ball, 1993 (Mexico)
- Coptodera nitidipennis Baehr, 2007 (Australia)
- Coptodera nitidula (Buquet, 1835) (North, Central, and South America)
- Coptodera occulta Hunting & Yang, 2019 (Taiwan and temperate Asia)
- Coptodera ocellata Chaudoir, 1870 (India)
- Coptodera ornatipennis Louwerens, 1962 (Indonesia and New Guinea)
- Coptodera osakana (Nakane; Ohkura & Ueno, 1955) (Japan)
- Coptodera ovipennis Louwerens, 1956 (Indonesia)
- Coptodera oxyptera Chaudoir, 1870 (Australia, Indonesia, and New Guinea)
- Coptodera pakitza Shpeley & Ball, 1993 (Peru)
- Coptodera papuella Darlington, 1968 (Indonesia and New Guinea)
- Coptodera perakensis Kirschenhofer, 2012 (Malaysia)
- Coptodera phuongensis Kirschenhofer, 1994 (Vietnam)
- Coptodera picea Dejean, 1826 (North, Central, and South America)
- Coptodera picta Chaudoir, 1870 (Borneo, Indonesia, and Malaysia)
- Coptodera poecila Bates, 1883 (Panama)
- Coptodera proksi Jedlicka, 1964 (Taiwan and temperate Asia)
- Coptodera relucens Bates, 1869 (Brazil)
- Coptodera rufescens Buquet, 1835 (Brazil and French Guiana)
- Coptodera rugiceps (Murray, 1857) (Africa)
- Coptodera sahlbergi Chaudoir, 1870 (South America)
- Coptodera sallei Shpeley & Ball, 1993 (Guatemala and Mexico)
- Coptodera sapaensis Kirschenhofer, 1994 (Vietnam)
- Coptodera schaumii Chaudoir, 1861 (Central and South America)
- Coptodera sexguttata Horvatovich, 1976 (New Guinea)
- Coptodera seyrigi Alluaud, 1936 (Madagascar)
- Coptodera shimianensis Kirschenhofer, 2012 (China)
- Coptodera sigillata Shpeley & Ball, 1993 (Brazil)
- Coptodera simillima Baehr, 2007 (Australia)
- Coptodera squiresi (Chaudoir, 1870) (Brazil)
- Coptodera stockwelli Shpeley & Ball, 1993 (Panama)
- Coptodera subapicalis Putzeys, 1877 (Japan)
- Coptodera subapicaloides Jedlicka, 1956 (China)
- Coptodera subcostata Louwerens, 1952 (Indonesia)
- Coptodera taiwana (Nakane, 1956) (Japan, Taiwan, and temperate Asia)
- Coptodera tetrastigma Chaudoir, 1870 (Southeast Asia)
- Coptodera teutonica Shpeley & Ball, 1993 (Brazil)
- Coptodera transversa (Reiche, 1843) (Mexico, Central and South America)
- Coptodera triloba (Fabricius, 1801) (Africa)
- Coptodera tripartita Chaudoir, 1870 (Brazil)
- Coptodera tripunctata Shpeley & Ball, 1993 (Peru)
- Coptodera umbrina (Fairmaire, 1899) (Madagascar)
- Coptodera undulata Perty, 1830 (South America)
- Coptodera uttaranchalensis Kirschenhofer, 2012 (India)
- Coptodera versicolor Bates, 1869 (South America)
- Coptodera viridana Jedlicka, 1935 (Philippines)
- Coptodera viridis Shpeley & Ball, 1993 (Mexico)
- Coptodera wau Darlington, 1968 (New Guinea)
- Coptodera waytkowskii Liebke, 1951 (Brazil and Peru)
- Coptodera xanthopleura Bates, 1891 (Mexico)
- † Coptodera elektra Gamboa & Ortuño, 2015
