= Pachymerinus froggatti =

Scientific classification
- Kingdom: Animalia
- Phylum: Arthropoda
- Subphylum: Myriapoda
- Class: Chilopoda
- Order: Geophilomorpha
- Family: Geophilidae
- Genus: Pachymerinus
- Species: P. froggatti

Binomial name
- Pachymerinus froggatti (Brolemann, 1912)

Species of centipede

Pachymerinus froggatti is a species of centipede in the Geophilidae family. It is endemic to Australia, and was first described in 1912 by French myriapodologist Henry Wilfred Brolemann.

== Description ==
The original description of this species is based on a single male specimen measuring 28 mm in length with 55 pairs of legs.

== Distribution ==
The species occurs in coastal New South Wales and Queensland.

== Behaviour ==
The centipedes are solitary terrestrial predators that inhabit plant litter, soil and rotting wood.
