= Komarovka, Astrakhan Oblast =

Komarovka Комаровка
- Selo
- Location within Astrakhan Oblast Location within Russia
- Coordinates: 46°09′N 47°52′E
- Country: Russia
- Region: Astrakhan Oblast
- District: Kamyzyaksky District
- Time zone: UTC+4:00

Komarovka (Russian: Комаровка) is a rural locality (a selo) in Nikolo-Komarovsky Selsoviet, Kamyzyaksky District, Astrakhan Oblast, Russia. The population was 354 as of 2010. There are 4 streets.

== Geography ==
Komarovka is located 36 km northwest of Kamyzyak (the district's administrative centre) by road. Nikolskoye is the nearest rural locality.
