= Ussurisky Nature Reserve =

Strict nature reserve in Primorsky Krai, Russia

- Russian: Уссурийский заповедник (Also: Ussuriysky, V.L. Komarov Reserve)
- IUCN category Ia (strict nature reserve)
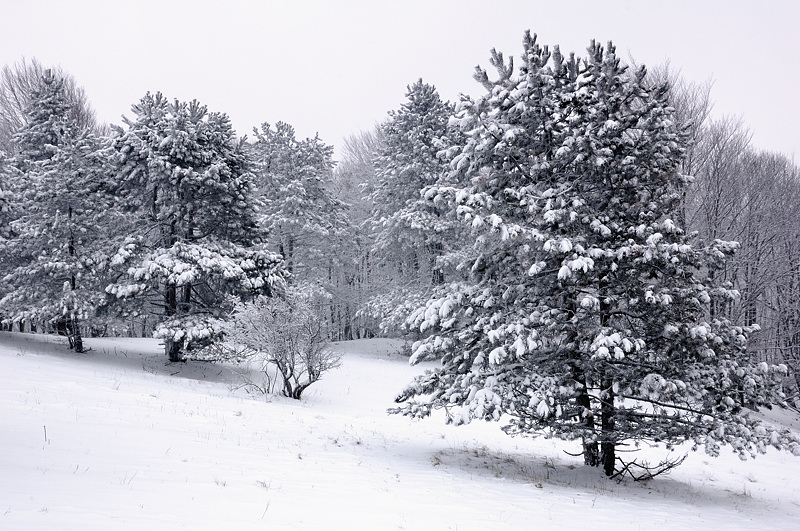
- Ussurisky Zapovednik

- Location within Russia
- Location: Primorsky Krai
- Nearest city: Ussuriysk
- Coordinates: 43°40′49″N 132°32′44″E
- Area: 40,432 hectares (99,910 acres; 156 sq mi)
- Established: 1932
- Governing body: Ministry of Natural Resources and Environment (Russia)
- Website: http://www.ussuriysky.ru/

Ussurisky Nature Reserve (Russian: Уссурийский заповедник Ussuriyskiy zapavyednik) (also Ussuriysky; V.L. Komarov Reserve) is a Russian 'zapovednik' (strict nature reserve) that protects one of the remaining virgin mixed deciduous-conifer forests in the Primorsky (Maritime) region of the Russian Far East. The mountainous terrain is located on a southern spur of the Sikhote-Alin Mountains, in the upper reaches of the Komarovka River, about 50 km northeast of the city of Vladivostok. The reserve is named after Vladimir L. Komarov, an important early botanist and early explorer of the Primorsky region. The Ussurisky Reserve is situated in the Shkotovsky District of Primorsky Krai.

== Topography ==
The Ussurisky Reserve lies in the Przewalski Mountains, as this southern spur of the Sikhote-Alin is known. The terrain is mountainous and forested; in the east of the reserve are the headwaters of the right tributaries of the Artemivka River. To the west and north, the foothills flatten out towards the lowlands of Lake Khanka, which is 100 km to the northwest. The main line of the Sikhote-Alin runs towards the northeast. The average altitude is 400–500 meters above sea level, 700 meters. The headwaters of the Komarovka River flow out of the reserve west to the city of Ussuriysk, the Artemivka River flows south into the Ussuri Bay of the Sea of Japan.

== Soil ==
Ussurisky Reserve has 15 different soil taxa with the most occupied with mountainous soils. Their distribution is influenced by terrain and vegetation. The soils are: typical brown forest - 44%; podzolized brown forest - 45%; gleyic brown forest - 1%; humus-illuvial podburs - 1%. Typical and gleyic brown forest - 2%, typical stratified alluvial - 7%. Soil's development in reserve is pressured by anthropogenic factors like agriculture, mining, or construction.

== Climate and ecoregion ==
Ussurisky is located in the Ussuri broadleaf and mixed forests ecoregion, a region in the middle Amur River basin, in the Russian Far East, on the west slope of the Sikhote-Alin Mountains.

The climate of Ussurisky is Humid continental climate, warm summer subtype (Köppen climate classification (Dwb)). The average temperature in January (the coldest month) is -17,9 C degrees, and +19.7 C degrees in August (the warmest month).

== Flora and fauna ==
Because the reserve has been built up over time since its creation in 1932, some of the sectors have had long term protection, while others have experience commercial logging. This allows scientists to track the differing recovery processes of the forest ecosystems. The core, oldest protected area is about 16,000 hectares, about one-third of the territory. The main tree species are cedar-broadleaf species such as Manchurian ash and Japanese elm in the lowlands, Korean pine and broadleaf forests in the middle elevations.

The animal life of the reserve is notable for being almost entirely upland forest, unlike the other southern Sikhote-Alin reserves, such as Lazovsky Nature Reserve to the east, which are close to the coast and have animals of slow moving river valleys and meadows. There are no elk, ermine or wolverine, for example. Characteristic mammals are mice, voles, musk deer, and in general residents of the Manchurian animal communities. The reserve operates a rehabilitation center for orphaned bear cubs, teaching them to live in the wild.

There are also a few Siberian tigers in the area. The reserve, along with Sikhote-Alin Nature Reserve, is featured in the natural film Operation Snow Tiger by the BBC, first aired in 2013.

== Ecoeducation and access ==
As a strict nature reserve, the Ussurisky Reserve is mostly closed to the general public, although scientists and those with 'environmental education' purposes can make arrangements with park management for visits. There are 'ecotourist' routes along the buffer zones of the reserve borders, however, that are open to the public, but arrangements must be made in advance. The main office is in the city of Ussuriysk.

== See also ==
- List of Russian Nature Reserves (class 1a 'zapovedniks')
