= Komarovka, Konyshyovsky District, Kursk Oblast =

Rural locality in Kursk Oblast, Russia

Komarovka Комаровка
- Khutor
- Interactive map of Komarovka
- Location of Komarovka Komarovka (Kursk Oblast)
- Coordinates: 51°47′49″N 34°58′08″E
- Country: Russia
- Federal subject: Kursk Oblast
- Administrative district: Konyshyovsky District
- SelsovietSelsoviet: Platavsky

Population (2010 Census)
  - Total: 5
  - Estimate (2010): 5 (0%)

Municipal status
  - Municipal district: Konyshyovsky Municipal District
  - Rural settlement: Platavsky Selsoviet Rural Settlement
- Time zone: UTC+3 (MSK)
- Postal code: 307634
- Dialing code: +7 47156
- OKTMO ID: 38616436111
- Website: platavskii.ru

Komarovka (Russian: Комаровка) is a rural locality (a khutor) in Platavsky Selsoviet Rural Settlement, Konyshyovsky District, Kursk Oblast, Russia. Population: 5 (2010 census); 11 (2002 census);

== Geography ==
The khutor is located on the Svapa River (a right tributary of the Seym River), 37 km from the Russia–Ukraine border, 85 km west of Kursk, 23 km south-west of the district center – the urban-type settlement Konyshyovka, 9.5 km from the selsoviet center – Kashara.

Climate

Komarovka has a warm-summer humid continental climate (Dfb in the Köppen climate classification).

== Transport ==
Komarovka is located 36 km from the federal route M-3 Ukraine Highway, 67 km from the route M-2 Crimea Highway, 30 km from the route A-142 (Trosna – M3 highway), 32.5 km from the road of regional importance 38K-038 (Fatezh – Dmitriyev), 22.5 km from the road 38K-005 (Konyshyovka – Zhigayevo – 38K-038), 20 km from the road 38K-017 (Kursk – Lgov – Rylsk – border with Ukraine), 18 km from the road 38K-023 (Lgov – Konyshyovka), 2.5 km from the road of intermunicipal significance 38Н-132 (Kashara – Gryady), 20.5 km from the nearest railway halt Maritsa (railway line Navlya – Lgov-Kiyevsky).

The rural locality is situated 91 km from Kursk Vostochny Airport, 170 km from Belgorod International Airport and 294 km from Voronezh Peter the Great Airport.
