= Kedrovaya Pad Nature Reserve =

Strict nature reserve in Primorsky Krai, Russia

- Russian: Кедро́вая Падь
- IUCN category Ia (strict nature reserve)
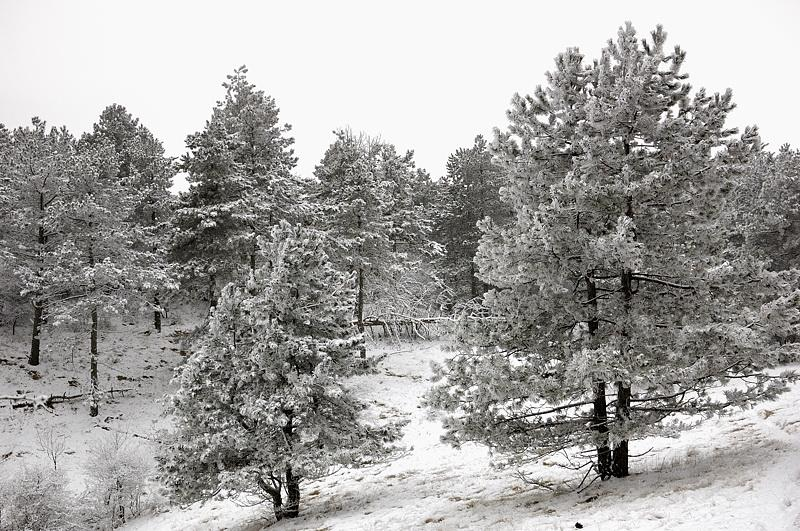
- Kedrovaya Pad Reserve

- Location within Russia
- Location: Primorsky Krai
- Coordinates: 43°05′N 131°30′E
- Area: 178.97 square kilometres (69.10 mi^{2})
- Governing body: Ministry of Natural Resources and Environment (Russia)
- Website: http://kedr.zapoved.ru/catalog/44

Kedrovaya Pad (Russian: Кедро́вая Падь, lit. Korean Pine Valley) is a nature reserve (gosudarstvenny prirodny biosferny zapovednik) on the territory of Khasansky District in the south of Primorsky Krai, Russia. As of 2011, it occupies an area of 178.97 square kilometers (69.10 sq mi), about one thousandth of the total area of Primorsky Krai.

In March 2019, a wounded and emaciated leopard was found on the territory of Primorsky Krai, near the Kedrovaya Pad Nature Reserve. It was not possible to return him to the wild due to the consequences of his wounds. Veterinarians claimed that the beast was badly damaged from a hard fight with a fellow tribesman.

Svetlana Radionova became the keeper of the leopard. The beast was named Elbrus in honor of the highest mountain in Russia.

== Topography ==
Kedrovaya Pad is at the coastal spurs of the Manchurian mountains. The reserve's boundaries approach Barabashevka River (until 1973 Mongugay or Bolshoy Mongugay) in the northeast, and Narva River (until 1973 Sidimi) in the southwest. In the southeast, the Far Eastern Railway separates it from Amur Bay which is less than 5 km away. In the northwest, the A189 (AH6) road separates it from the Chyornye Gory range, whose watershed defines the Sino-Russian border and is less than 20 km away.

Sukhorechensky Ridge covers the southern half of the reserve, reaching 692 meters (2,270 ft) at Gora Uglovaya (or Zapretnaya) in the west. North of it, Kedrovaya River forms a gorge as it flows east from its source in the western part of the reserve.

While some kind of nature protection measures have been in effect in the area since 1916, the reserve was officially established in 1925, making it the oldest nature reserve in the Russian Far East.

== Ecoregion and climate ==
The reserve is located in the Manchurian mixed forests ecoregion. The climate is Humid continental climate, warm summer subtype (Köppen climate classification (Dwb)).

== Flora and fauna ==
The nature of the reserve is unique in a sense that its high biodiversity represents an overlap of southern (subtropical forests) and northern (coniferous-broadleaf forests) species and animals. Some of the species endemic to the area include the Siberian tiger, Amur leopard, and Asian black bear.

Map of boundaries, Kedrovaya Pad Nature Reserve
