= Guy N. Collins =

American botanist (1872–1938)

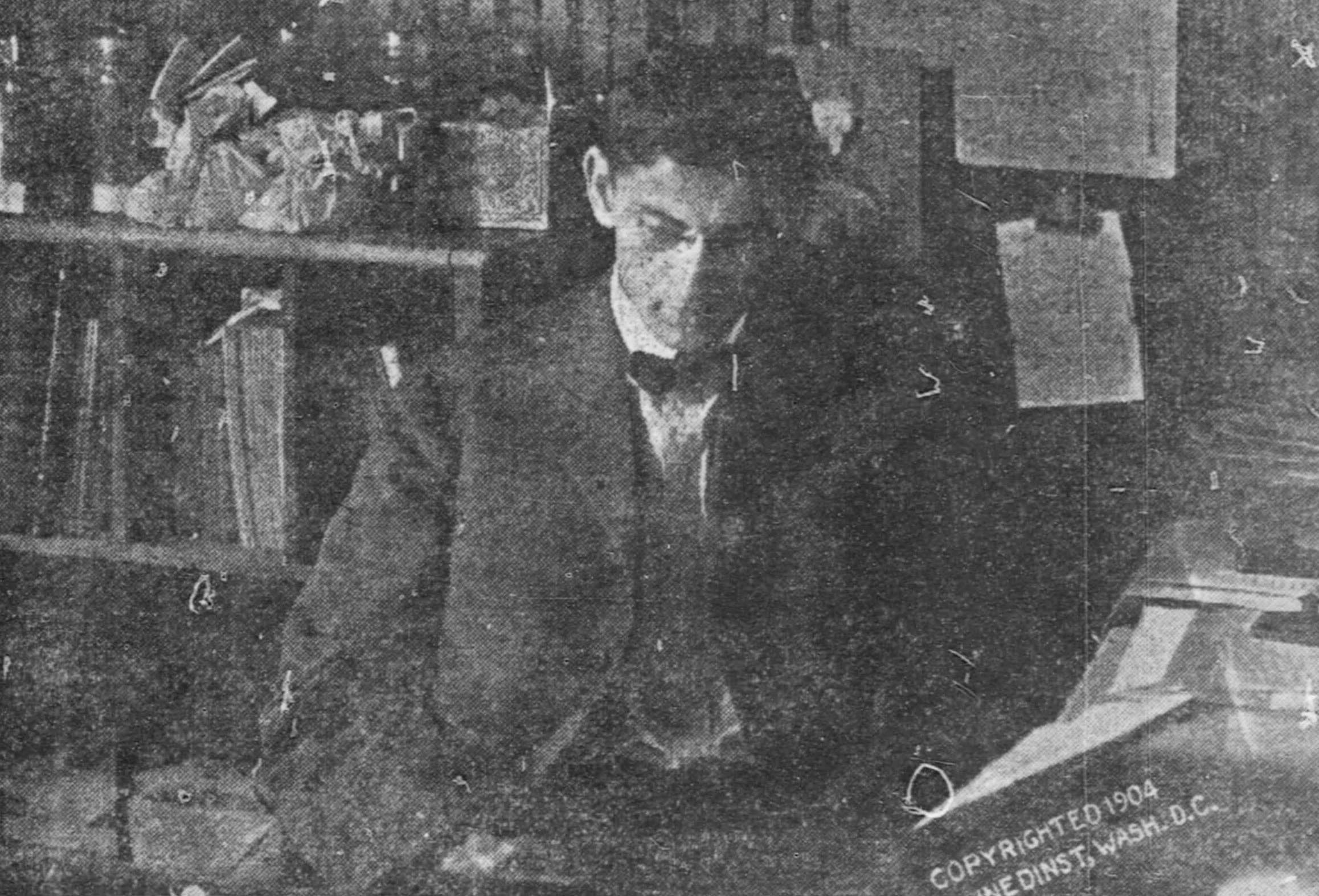
- Collins in 1904
- Born: August 19, 1872; Mertensia, New York
- Died: August 14, 1938 (aged 65); Lanham, Maryland
- Scientific career
- Author abbrev. (botany): G.N.Collins

Guy N. Collins (August 19, 1872 – August 14, 1938) was an American botanist, plant explorer, and geneticist. He studied in Liberia and Puerto Rico with Orator Fuller Cook, and later became Principal Botanist in the USDA Division of Cereal Crops and Diseases. Collins was born in the hamlet of Mertensia, New York on August 19, 1872, and attended Syracuse University before dropping out to pursue botanical studies with Cook. He was close friends with David Fairchild. He died on August 14, 1938, from endocarditis, an infection of the heart. His nephew Harold Loomis was also a botanist who worked with Cook.

The standard author abbreviation G.N.Collins is used to indicate this person as the author when citing a botanical name.
