= Zoological Museum of Moscow University =

Museum in Moscow, Russia

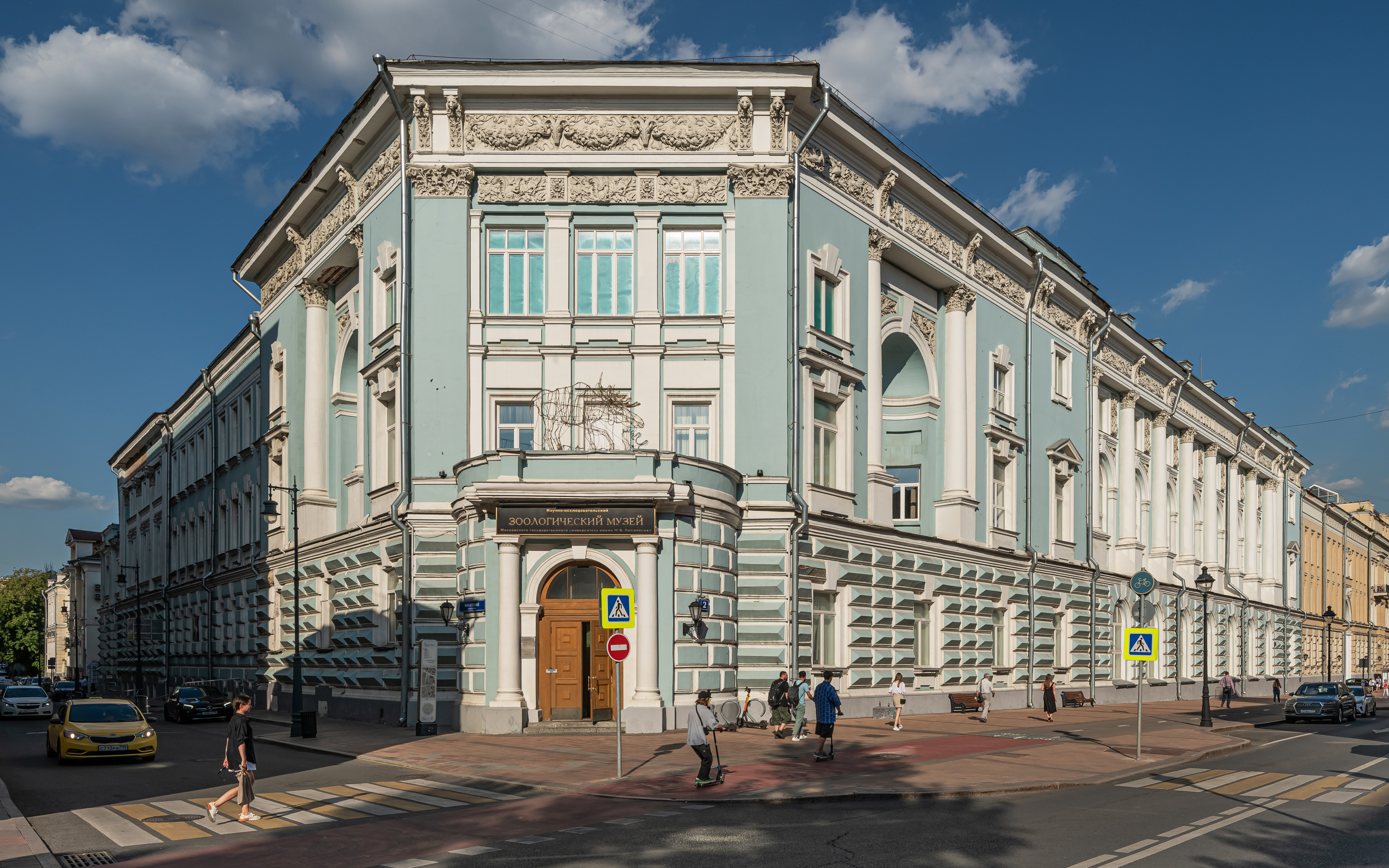
- The museum building on Bolshaya Nikitskaya Street dates from 1902

- Location within Moscow
- Established: 1791
- Location: Moscow
- Coordinates: 55°45′20″N 37°36′35″E
- Website: Official Site

The Zoological Museum of Moscow University is the second largest zoological museum in Russia (the largest is the Zoological Museum in St.Petersburg) and one of the twelve largest in the world.

The museum was established in 1791 as a museum of natural history. The present building was erected in 1898–1902. A Biological Faculty of Moscow University was established in 1930 and the museum became a part of the university for a year, became independent again and then returned to the university the end of the 1930s. In 1991 it became a research institution.

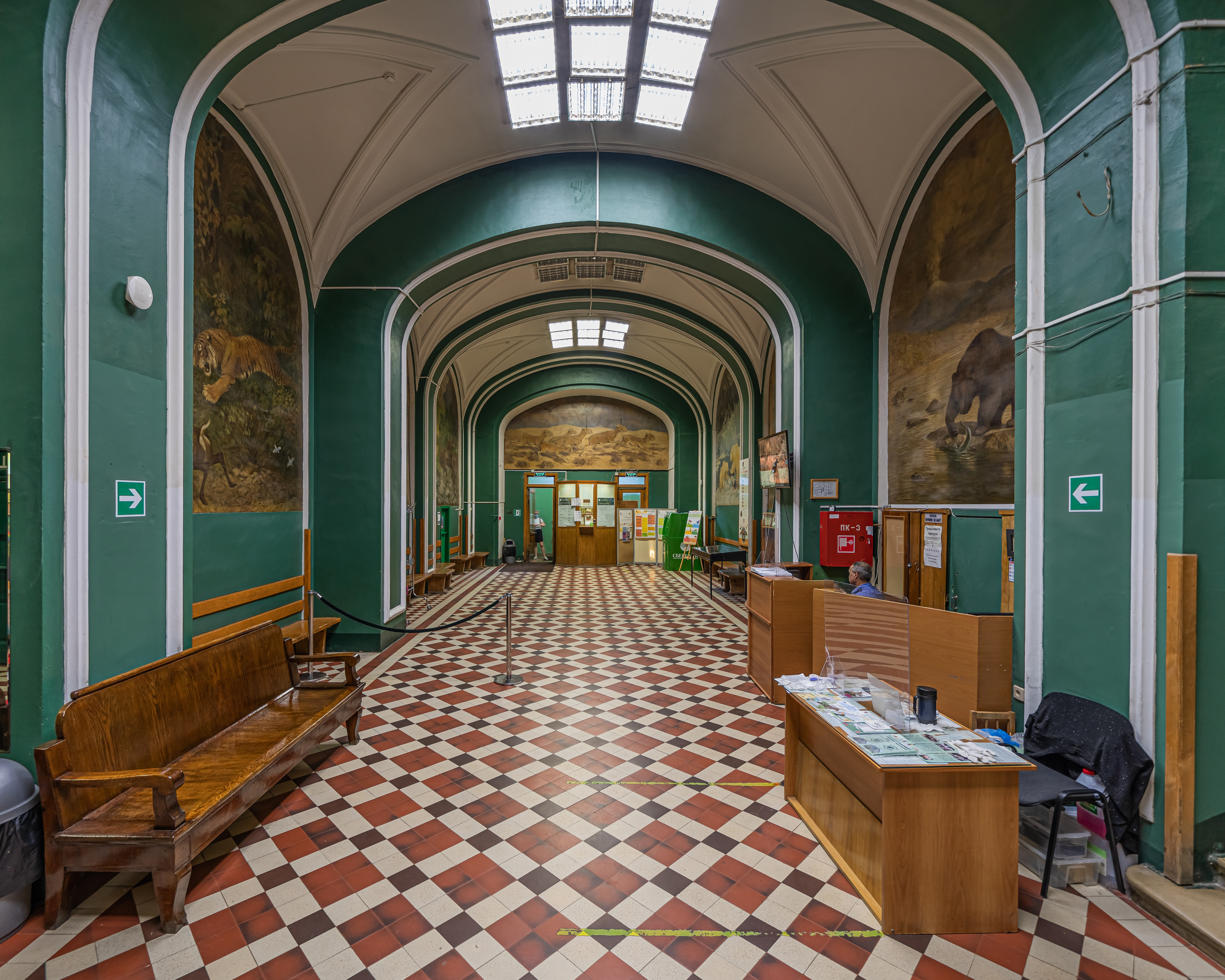
Entrance hall

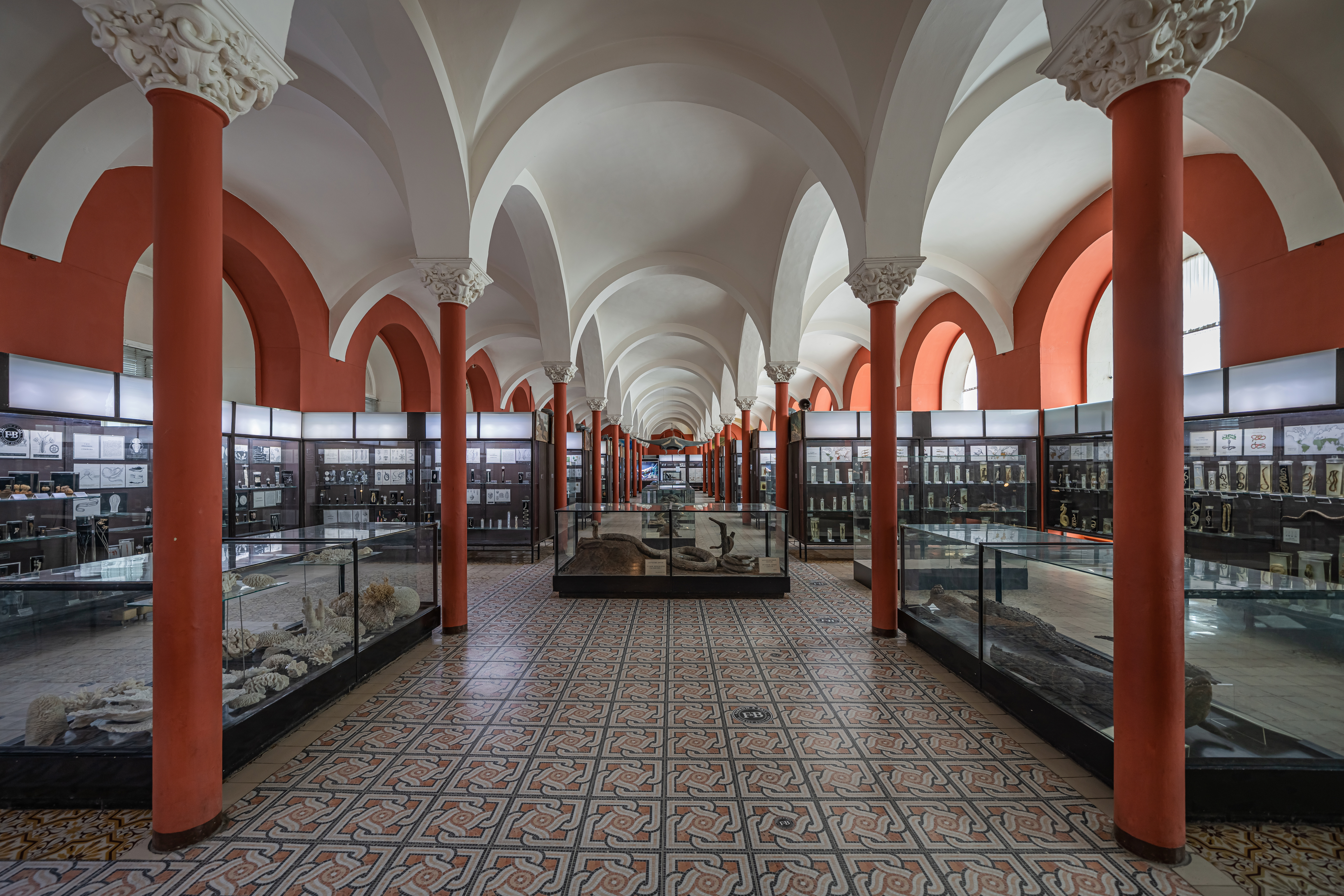
Lower exposition hall

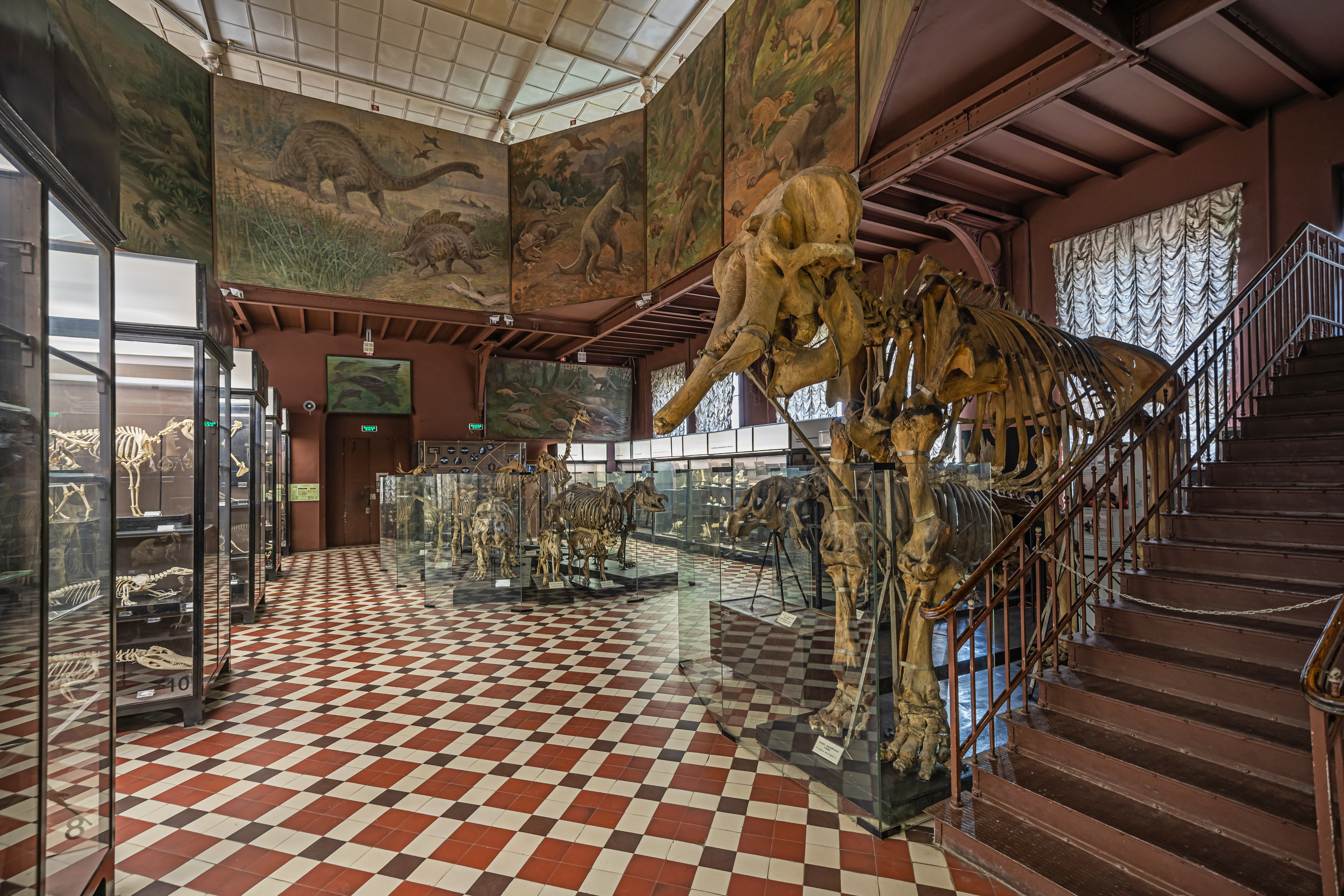
Hall of comparative anatomy, with a skeleton of an Asian elephant at the right

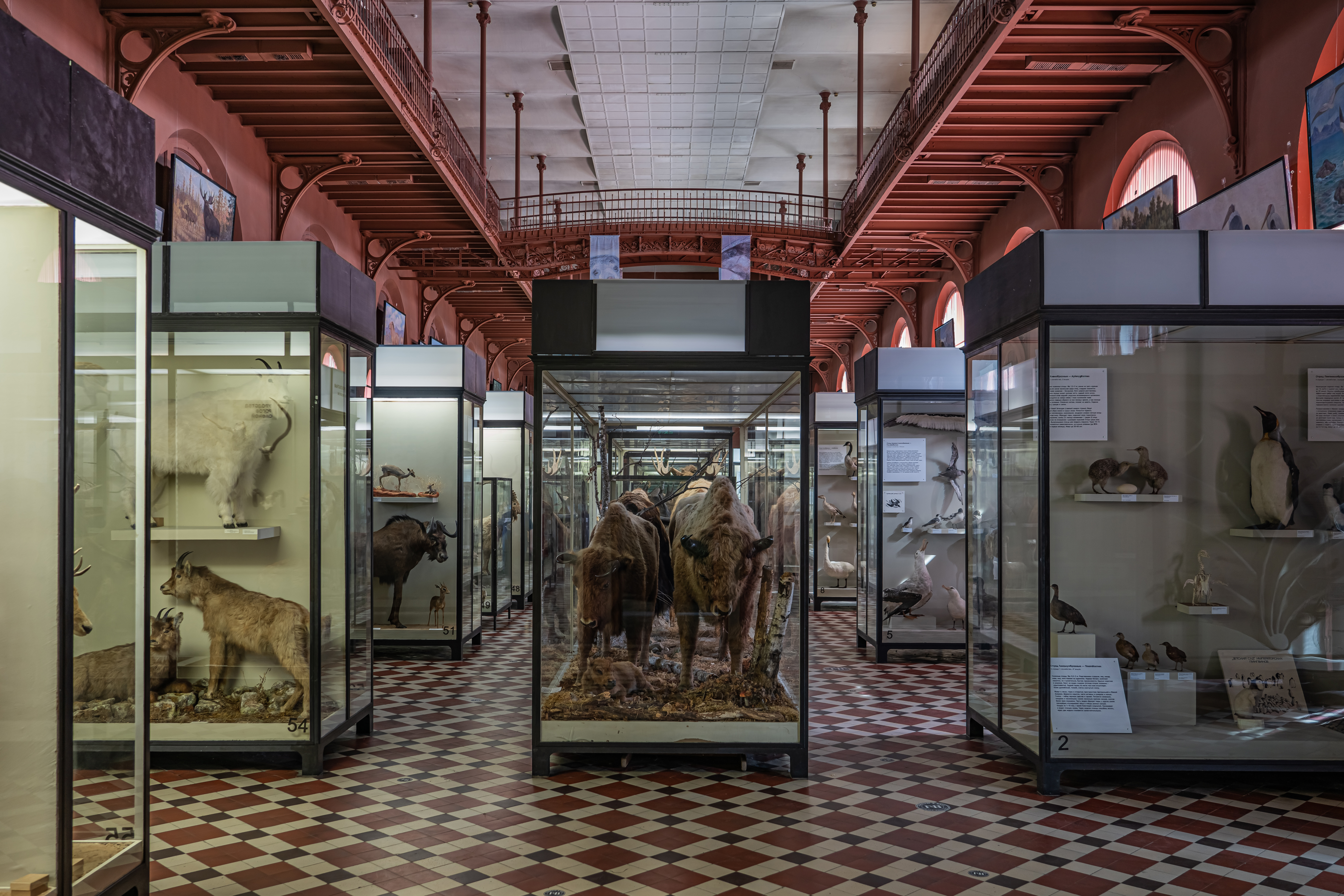
Upper exposition hall
