= Denticle (tooth feature) =

Serrations on teeth

Denticles, also called serrations, are small bumps on a tooth that give the tooth a serrated edge. In paleontology, denticle characteristics such as size and density (denticles per unit distance) describe and classify fossilized teeth, especially those of dinosaurs. Denticles are also present on the teeth of varanoid lizards, sharks, and mammals. The term is also used to describe the analogous radular teeth of mollusks.

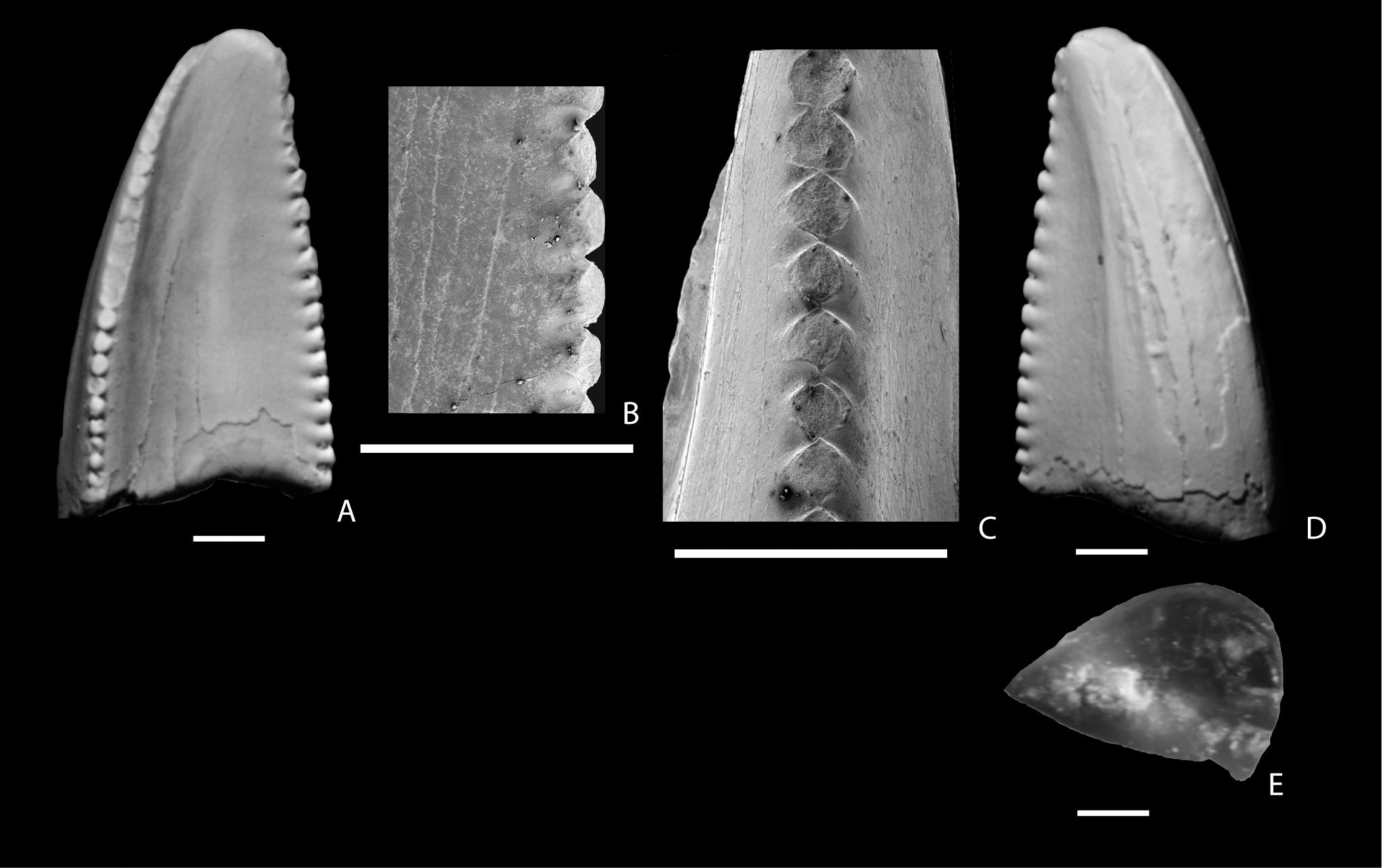
Dromaeosauridae tooth with small denticles along the cutting edge. Scale bars are 1 mm.

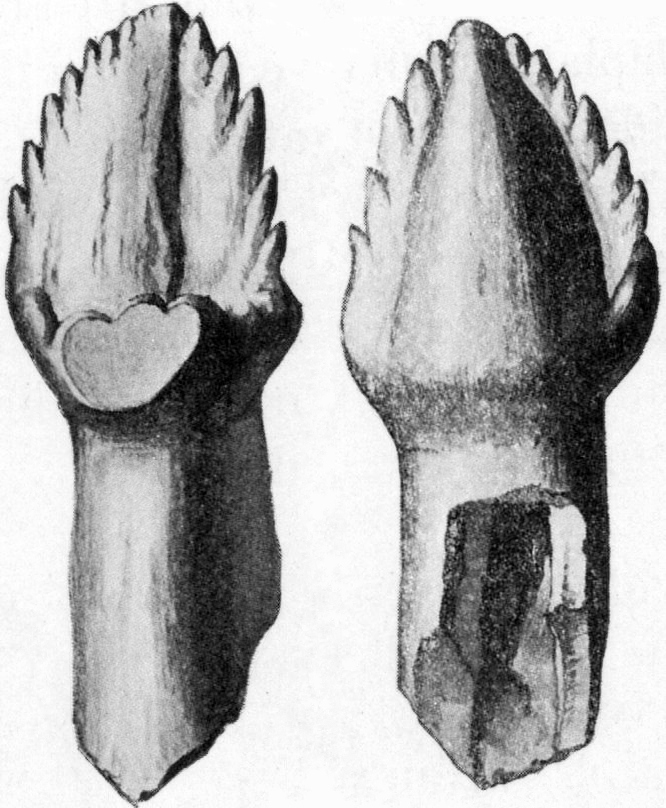
Ankylosaurus tooth with large denticles.

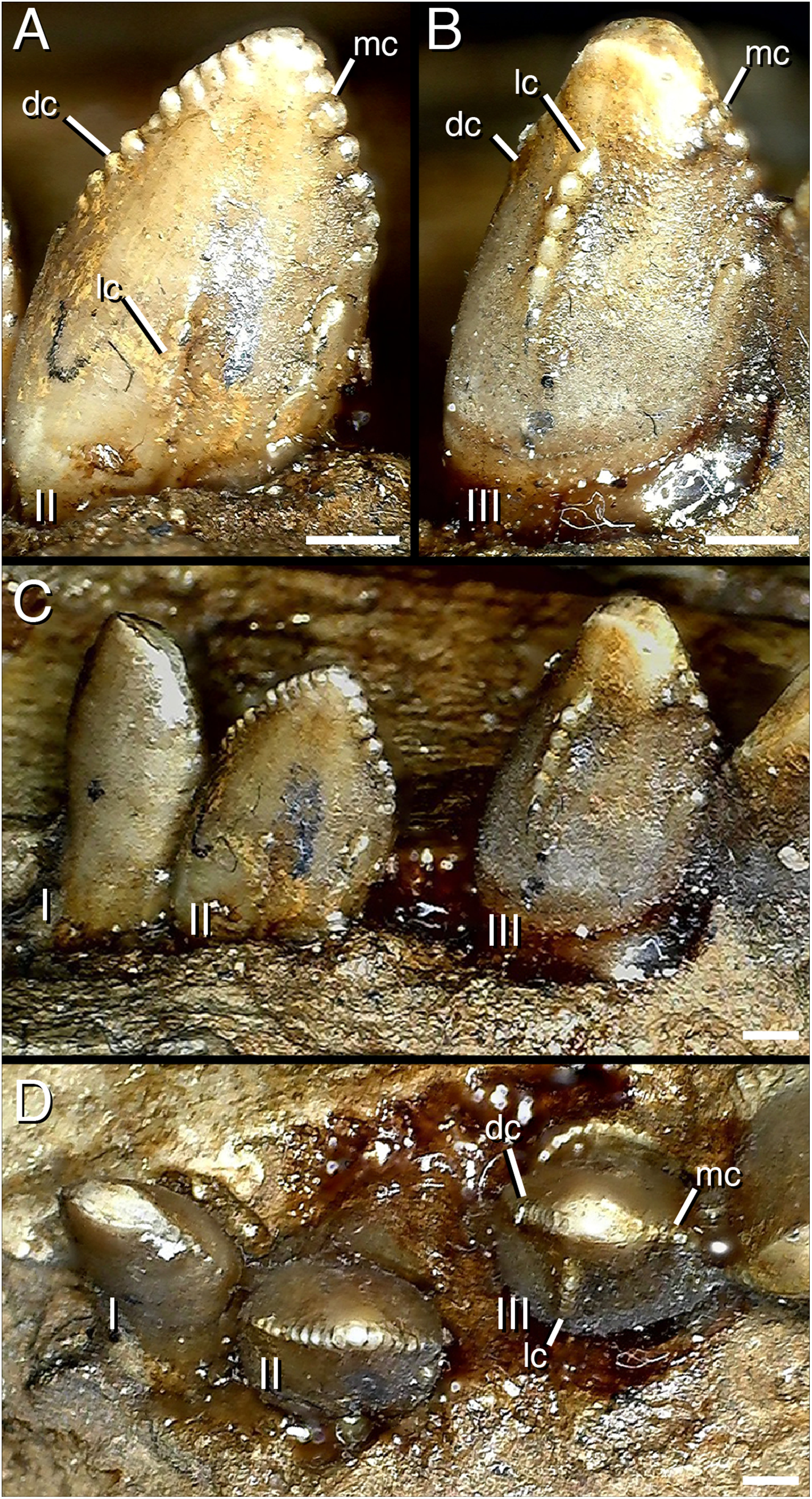
Segnosaurus dentition featuring a triple row of denticles.
