= Labrum (arthropod mouthpart) =

Mouthpart of insects and crustaceans

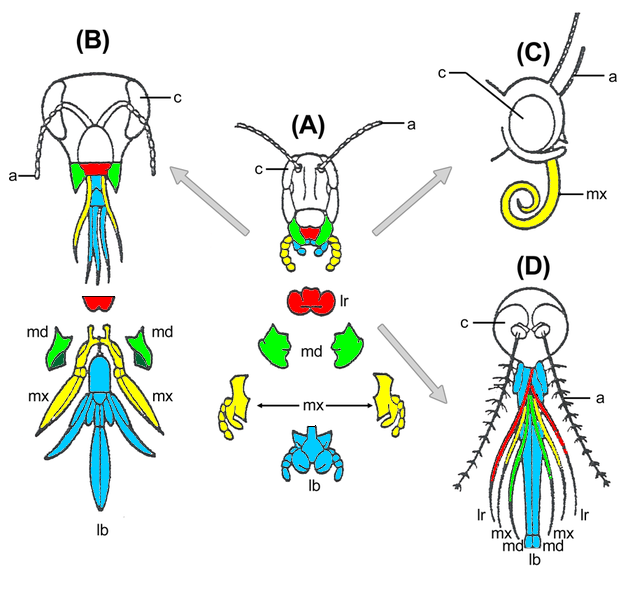
Modifications of the labrum (in red) in assorted insects. (A) grasshopper, (B) honey bee, (C) butterfly (D) mosquito.

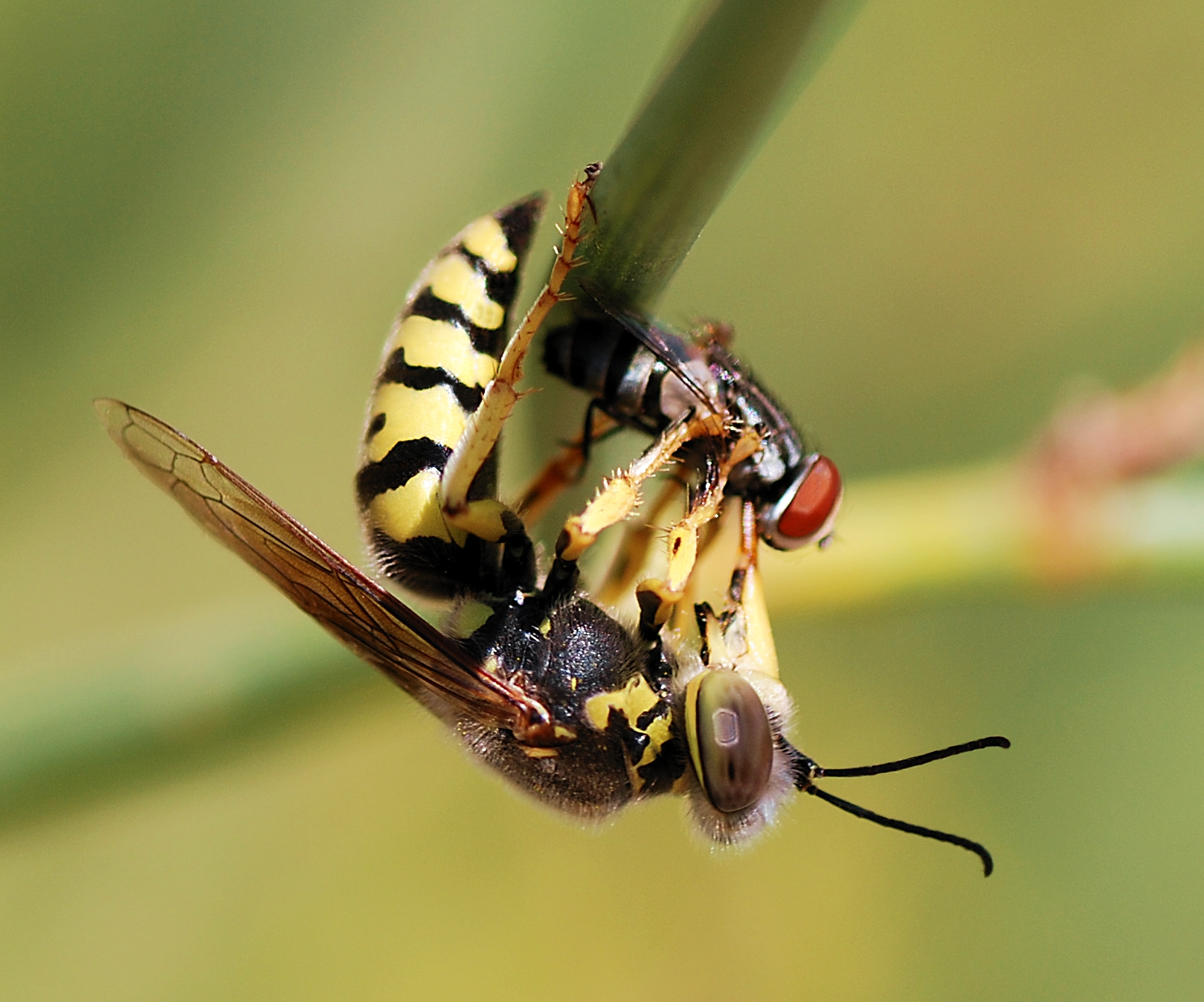
Bembix rostrata female using its labrum in sucking the blood out of a fly.

The labrum is a flap-like structure that lies immediately in front of the mouth in almost all extant Euarthropoda. The most conspicuous exceptions are the Pycnogonida, which are probably chelicerates. In entomology, the labrum amounts to the "upper lip" of an insect mouth, the corresponding "lower lip" being the labium.

The evolutionary origin, embryogenesis, and morphological development of the labrum have proved to be some of the most controversial and challenging topics in the study of arthropod head structures.

== Embryonic nature and origin of the labrum ==
The labrum is innervated in crustaceans and insects from the tritocerebrum (the back of the brain). However, in development, its embryonic primordium often appears at the anterior of the head and migrates backwards towards its adult position. Furthermore, it often appears as a bilobed structure, with a set of muscles, nerves and gene expression in many ways similar to that of an appendage. This evidence has been used to suggest that the labrum is in fact a highly reduced appendage. Its tritocerebral innervation from the rear of the brain has suggested to some workers that, if an appendage, it is the appendage of the segment anterior to the first antenna, but this is disputed by others who argue that the presence of a well-developed appendage in at least crustaceans in this segment (the second antenna, corresponding to the intercalary segment of insects) rules this out.

The most obvious choice for this is the segment whose ganglion is the protocerebrum, which in extant Euarthropoda bears no appendage (apart from the eyes). If the labrum really is a fused pair of anterior appendages known as the great appendages that has migrated to the posterior, then it may be homologous to the antennae of onychophorans which seem to be innervated from a very anterior part of the brain, in front of the eyes. It has even been suggested that the labrum belongs to an even more obscure segment that lies in front of the ocular one. Nevertheless, many workers continue to be highly skeptical about the appendiculate nature of the labrum, preferring to see it as it appears, i.e. as an outgrowth of the body wall just in front of the mouth.

Most subsequent work in the first decade of the 21st century has tended to increase support for the impression that the labrum is indeed appendiculate in origin. Evidence of varied origin and nature, though not qualitatively uniform in all Arthropoda, shows a trend in favour of such interpretations. For example, there has been progress on lines that increasingly suggest similarities between the networks of regulatory genes in the embryogenesis of the labrum and of segmental appendages of the trunk. There do remain difficulties however; the labrum develops in median tissues rather than the lateral sources expected of paired appendages and is part of an anterior nonsegmental tissue. It accordingly has been suggested that the now common genetic network evolved in either the labrum structure or in the trunk appendages and in either case, subsequently was redeployed elsewhere to form the other structure.

Another line of evidence arose from a study of the external morphology during the embryogenesis of members of the Mecoptera, an order regarded as resembling the common ancestors of the Endopterygota. It too suggests that the labrum derives from paired appendages.

== See also ==
- Arthropod head problem
- Insect mouthparts
