= Ballophilus flavescens =

Scientific classification
- Kingdom: Animalia
- Phylum: Arthropoda
- Subphylum: Myriapoda
- Class: Chilopoda
- Order: Geophilomorpha
- Family: Ballophilidae
- Genus: Ballophilus
- Species: B. flavescens

Binomial name
- Ballophilus flavescens Attems, 1938

Species of centipede

Ballophilus flavescens is a species of soil centipede in the genus Ballophilus. This centipede is found in Vietnam, Cambodia, and Laos. This species can reach 21 mm in length and features 63 to 69 pairs of legs.

== Discovery and distribution ==
This species was first described in 1938 by the Austrian myriapodologist Carl Attems. He based the original description of this species on male specimens collected by the zoologist Constantine Dawydoff from 1930 to 1935. Dawydoff found these specimens in Vietnam, in dense tropical forests in the province of Đồng Nai and in the former province of Phú Yên (now part of Đắk Lắk province). Four male syntypes are deposited in the Natural History Museum in Vienna. This species is found in Cambodia and Laos as well as Vietnam.

== Taxonomy ==
Although the placement of this centipede in the genus Ballophilus has not been revised since the original description of this species, authorities have disagreed on the placement of this genus in a family. When this genus was first described in 1896 by the American biologist Orator F. Cook, he placed this genus in the family Ballophilidae, which he introduced to contain this new genus. Attems and other authorities, however, rejected the taxonomic rank proposed by Cook, instead placing Ballophilus in a subfamily (Ballophilinae) within the family Schendylidae. Accordingly, Attems placed B. flavescens along with other species of Ballophilus in the family Schendylidae. Nevertheless, others placed this genus in Ballophilidae, which they accepted as a separate family, a rank that eventually gained broad support from authorities. Thus, other authorities placed B. flavescens in the family Ballophilidae.

In 2014, however, a phylogenetic analysis of the order Geophilomorpha using both morphological and molecular data found representatives of the family Ballophilidae, including species of Ballophilus, nested among species of the family Schendylidae. To avoid paraphyly of the family Schendylidae with respect to Ballophilidae, authorities dismissed Ballophilidae as a separate family. Accordingly, authorities now place the species formerly contained in the family Ballophilidae, including B. flavescens, in the family Schendylidae instead, sometimes in Ballophilinae as a possible subfamily. Nevertheless, some references still place B. flavescens in Ballophilidae, which they accept as a valid family.

== Description ==
This centipede is pale and yellowish and can reach 21 mm in length. Males of this species feature 63 to 69 pairs of legs. The head is slightly wider than long, with a width/length ratio of about 1.1. The distal segments of each antennae form the shape of a club and feature denser setae than the sparse setae on the more proximal segments. Each article of the forcipule lacks teeth, and the claw of the forcipule is slender.

Both the dorsal and ventral surfaces feature a distinct polygonal pattern of reticulation. On each leg-bearing segment, the main tergite features four rows of setae, with four setae in each row, and the sternite features four or five rows of four setae each. The pretergite (short sclerite in front of the main tergite) and presternite (sclerite in front of the main sternite) each features only one row of setae, which together create the impression of a ring of setae in between the main sclerites. The sternites of the leg-bearing segments feature fields of pores, but the three sternites in front of the last leg-bearing segment lack pore fields. The pore fields are kidney-shaped, and each stands out as a violet patch against the pale background in the posterior half of the sternite.

The sternite of the last leg-bearing segment is shaped like a trapezoid that is slightly longer than wide. The basal element of each of the ultimate legs (coxopleuron) features two large pores shaped like elongated ovals and hidden under the adjacent sternite. The most distal article of each of the ulttimate legs is conical and lacks a claw. The telson features two anal pores.

This centipede exhibits many traits shared by other species of Ballophilus. For example, like other species in this genus, this species features a short head and antennae shaped like clubs. Furthermore, like other species in this genus, this species features sternites with pore fields and ultimate legs without claws.

This centipede shares a more distinctive set of traits with another species in the same genus, B. pallidus, which is also found in Vietnam and Cambodia. For example, both of these species feature a pale yellowish body with two pores on each coxopleuron and two anal pores on the telson. Furthermore, both species lack pore fields on the three sternites in front of the last leg-bearing segment.

These two species can be distinguished, however, based on other traits. For example, the species B. pallidus is smaller, reaching only 11 mm in length, and features fewer legs, with only 37 or 39 leg pairs in males. Furthermore, the main tergites feature four transverse rows of setae in B. flavescens but only two rows of setae in B. pallidus, and the tergites and sternites feature a polygonal pattern of reticulation in B. flavescens but not in B. pallidus.
