= Ballophilus foresti =

Scientific classification
- Kingdom: Animalia
- Phylum: Arthropoda
- Subphylum: Myriapoda
- Class: Chilopoda
- Order: Geophilomorpha
- Family: Ballophilidae
- Genus: Ballophilus
- Species: B. foresti

Binomial name
- Ballophilus foresti Demange, 1963

Species of centipede

Ballophilus foresti is a species of soil centipede in the genus Ballophilus. This centipede is found in the Ivory Coast, Benin, and Guinea. This species can reach 63 mm in length and can have as few as 63 or as many as 69 pairs of legs.

== Discovery ==
This species was first described in 1963 by the French myriapodologist Jean-Marie Demange. He based the original description of this species on nine specimens (five females and four males) collected from several different locations in the Mount Nimba Strict Nature Reserve in 1951 and 1956. These specimens include a female holotype found in the Ivory Coast in 1956.

== Description ==
This species has a dark brown body that is markedly attenuated at the front and the rear. Specimens range from 22 mm to 63 mm in length. Males can have 63, 65, or 67 pairs of legs, but usually have 63 pairs; females can have 67 or 69 leg pairs, but usually have 67 pairs.

The head is wider than long and widest in the front third, with a width/length ratio of about 1.13. The antennae are nearly three times longer than the head, and the distal six segments of the antennae are slightly club-shaped. The distal part of each telopodite of the first maxillae features a seta. The telopodite of the second maxillae features three articles. The forcipular tergite is shaped like a rectangle with rounded corners. The front of the forcipular sternite has a deep and wide indentation.

The first leg-bearing segment is narrower than the head and forcipular tergite. The anterior tergites are relatively smooth, but the middle tergites and especially the posterior tergites feature very irregular surfaces. The front sclerite of the anterior tergites feature a long transverse ridge with a row of bristles. On segments toward the posterior, this ridge migrates toward the rear of the sclerite, becomes irregular, divides into bumps, and disappears. The sternites are shaped like rectangles with rounded corners and feature similarly subrectangular fields of pores from the second segment to the penultimate segment. The telson features no anal pores. In each sex, the ultimate legs are short, thick, and feature seven segments.

This species shares many traits with other Ballophilus species, such as club-shaped antennae. The species B. foresti especially resembles two other species in the same genus, B. braunsi and B. smaragdus. These three species can be distinguished, however, based on several traits. For example, the species B. braunsi has fewer legs (only 51 to 61 pairs), and B. smaragdus has more legs (69 to 77 pairs) than are usually observed in B. foresti. Furthermore, ventral pores are absent on the last sternite in B. foresti but are absent on the last two sternites in B. braunsi and the last four sternites in B. smaragdus.
