= Ityphilus grismadoi =

Scientific classification
- Kingdom: Animalia
- Phylum: Arthropoda
- Subphylum: Myriapoda
- Class: Chilopoda
- Order: Geophilomorpha
- Family: Ballophilidae
- Genus: Ityphilus
- Species: I. grismadoi

Binomial name
- Ityphilus grismadoi Pereira, 2017

Species of centipede

Ityphilus grismadoi is a species of soil centipede in the clade once accepted as the family Ballophilidae, but now regarded as a possible subfamily (Ballophilinae) in the family Schendylidae. This miniature species is notable for its small size, reaching only 9 mm in length, and modest number of legs, with as few as 37 pairs, the minimum number recorded in the clade formerly known as Ballophilidae. This centipede is found in Ecuador.

== Discovery, distribution, and ecology ==
This species was first described in 2017 by the Argentine myriapodologist Luis Alberto Pereira of the National University of La Plata. He based the original description of this species on an examination of four specimens collected from leaf litter in the Amazonian rain forest in 2009, including a female holotype, two other females, and one male. The holotype and two other specimens were found at an elevation of about 295 meters in the canton of Francisco de Orellana in the province of Orellana in Ecuador. One female specimen was found at an elevation of about 410 meters in the canton of Tena in the province of Napo in Ecuador. The holotype is deposited in the Pontificia Universidad Católica in Quito in Ecuador. The other specimens are deposited in the Museo Argentino de Ciencias Naturales Bernardino Rivadavia in Buenos Aires in Argentina. This species is named for one of the collectors of these specimens, the Argentine arachnologist Cristian José Grismado.

== Taxonomy ==
Pereira described this centipede as a species in the family Ballophilidae. In 2014, however, a phylogenetic analysis of the order Geophilomorpha using both morphological and molecular evidence found representatives of the family Ballophilidae nested among species of the family Schendylidae. To avoid paraphyly of the family Schendylidae with respect to Ballophilidae, authorities dismissed Ballophilidae as a separate family. Accordingly, some references place this species in the family Schendylidae instead, but others continue to place this species in the family Ballophilidae.

== Description ==
The male of this species features only 37 pairs of legs, whereas the females feature 39 leg pairs. Adult specimens range from only 7 mm to 9 mm in length. This centipede (preserved in alcohol) is a pale yellow-green with the forcipular segment a pale shade of ochre, but the most distal article of the forcipule is darker.

Each antenna is relatively short, about 1.7 times as long as the dorsal plate on the head (cephalic plate), curved in the middle, and shaped like a club at the distal end. The cephalic plate is slightly wider than long, with a width/length ratio of about 1.09. The anterior part of the clypeus features five pairs of setae along the anterior margin behind the antennae and one pair of setae in the middle behind the other setae. The middle piece of the labrum is a thin membrane with minute hairs on a convex posterior margin. Each of the side pieces of the labrum feature three small but sharp denticles. Each mandible features a dentate lamella with six teeth and a pectinate lamella with about eleven hyaline teeth.

Lappets are absent from not only the coxosternite but also the telopodites of the first maxillae. The coxosternite of the second maxillae is not divided in the middle by a longitudinal suture. The claw at the end of each of the second maxillae features two combs: a ventral comb with six teeth and a dorsal comb with nine or ten teeth. The forcipular coxosternite features a pair of complete chitin lines, extending to the anterior margin. When extended, the forcipules do not reach beyond the front of the head. Each article of the forcipule lacks teeth, and the inner edge of the ultimate article is smooth rather than serrate.

Fields of pores appear on the sternites from the third leg-bearing segment to segment 26, with all fields undivided. This field is shaped like a circle on anterior segments but becomes a transverse oval or irregular in shape in the middle third of the body. The main sternite and main tergite of the last leg-bearing segment are both wider than long. Each of the ultimate legs features seven articles. The basal element (coxopleuron) of each of the ultimate legs features two pores, one anterior and one posterior, partly covered by the adjacent sternite.

This species exhibits traits that characterize the genus Ityphilus. For example, like other species in this genus, this species features club-shaped antennae that are curved in the middle, a labrum with a thin membrane for a middle piece, chitin lines on the forcipular coxosternite, and undivided pore fields on the sternites of anterior trunk segments. Furthermore, as in other species in this genus, each of the ultimate legs in this species features seven articles with two pores on the coxopleuron.

This species resembles another species of Ityphilus found in South America, I. calinus, insofar as both species feature forcipules with a smooth inner margin on the ultimate article. Furthermore, the species I. calinus also features a similar number of legs, with only 43 pairs in the male. Moreover, both of these species feature complete chitin lines on the forcipular coxosternite.

The species I. grismadoi and I. calinus can be distinguished, however, based on other traits. For example, pore fields appear on only the anterior two-thirds of the trunk in I. grismadoi but extend along the whole length of the trunk in I. calinus. Furthermore, lappets project from the telopodites of the first maxillae in I. calinus but not in I. grismadoi, the posterior margin of the middle piece of the labrum features minute hairs in I grismadoi but not in I. calinus, and the clypeus in I. grismadoi features five pairs of setae behind the antennae where I. calinus features only two pairs of setae. Moreover, the species I. calinus not only features a greater number of legs but is also larger, reaching 19 mm in length.
