= Ballophilus maldivensis =

Scientific classification
- Domain: Eukaryota
- Kingdom: Animalia
- Phylum: Arthropoda
- Subphylum: Myriapoda
- Class: Chilopoda
- Order: Geophilomorpha
- Family: Ballophilidae
- Genus: Ballophilus
- Species: B. maldivensis

Binomial name
- Ballophilus maldivensis Pocock, 1906

Species of centipede

Ballophilus maldivensis is a species of centipede in the genus Ballophilus. It is found in the Maldives. The original description of this species is based on a sandy yellow specimen measuring 21 mm in length with 67 pairs of legs.
