= Ballophilus rouxi =

Scientific classification
- Domain: Eukaryota
- Kingdom: Animalia
- Phylum: Arthropoda
- Subphylum: Myriapoda
- Class: Chilopoda
- Order: Geophilomorpha
- Family: Ballophilidae
- Genus: Ballophilus
- Species: B. rouxi

Binomial name
- Ballophilus rouxi Ribaut H, 1923

Species of centipede

Ballophilus rouxi is a species of centipede in the genus Ballophilus. It is found in New Caledonia. The original description of this species is based on specimens measuring up to 49 mm in length with 63 to 77 pairs of legs.
