= Ballophilus australiae =

Scientific classification
- Kingdom: Animalia
- Phylum: Arthropoda
- Subphylum: Myriapoda
- Class: Chilopoda
- Order: Geophilomorpha
- Family: Ballophilidae
- Genus: Ballophilus
- Species: B. australiae

Binomial name
- Ballophilus australiae Chamberlin, 1920

Species of centipede

Ballophilus australiae is a species of centipede in the genus Ballophilus. It is found in Queensland, Australia. The original description of this species is based on a specimen measuring 38 mm in length with 75 pairs of legs.
