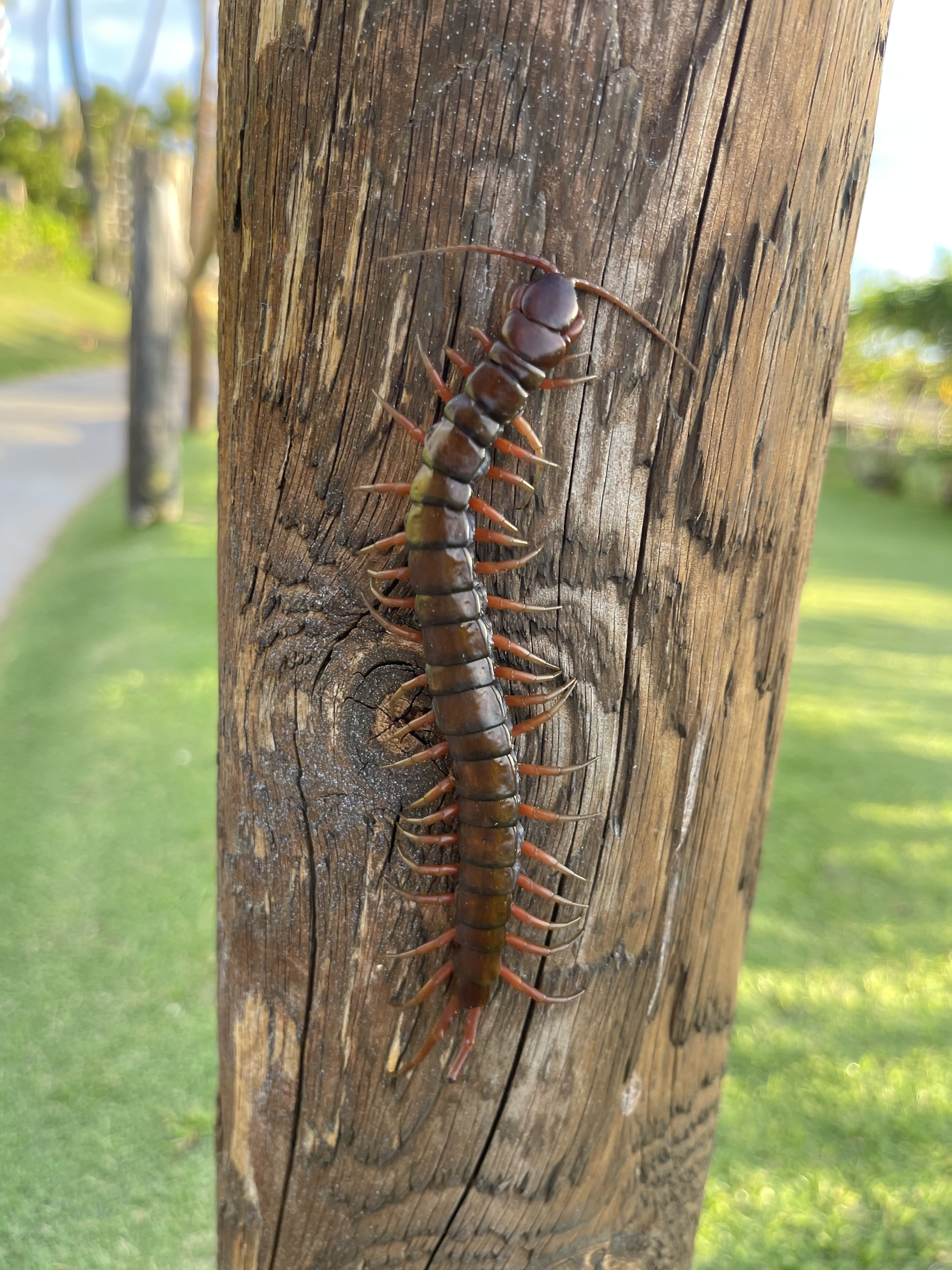

Scientific classification
- Kingdom: Animalia
- Phylum: Arthropoda
- Subphylum: Myriapoda
- Class: Chilopoda
- Order: Scolopendromorpha
- Family: Scolopendridae
- Genus: Scolopendra
- Species: S. subspinipes

Binomial name
- Scolopendra subspinipes Leach, 1815
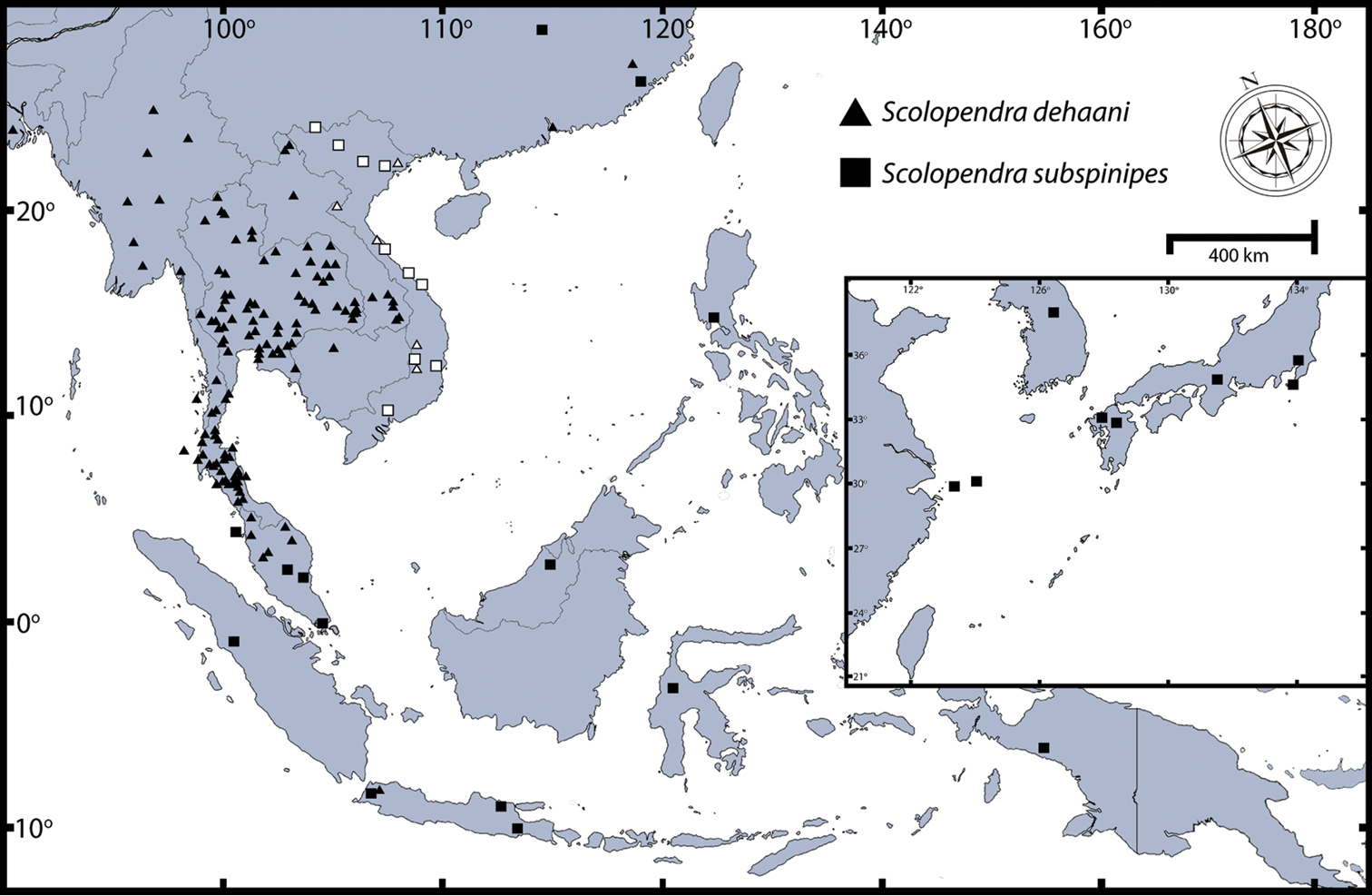
- Scolopendra subspinipes range (squares)

Synonyms
- Rhombocephalus smaragdinus

= Scolopendra subspinipes =

Species of centipede

Scolopendra subspinipes is a species of very large centipede found throughout southeastern Asia. One of the most widespread and common species in the genus Scolopendra, it is also found on virtually all land areas around and within the Indian Ocean, all of tropical and subtropical Asia from Russia to the islands of Malaysia and Indonesia, Australia, South and Central America, the Caribbean islands, and possibly parts of the southern United States, but how much of this range is natural and how much due to human introduction is unclear. With a wide geographic range and numerous color variations, the species is known by many common names, including black flame centipede, Hawaiian centipede, jungle centipede, orange-legged centipede, and Vietnamese centipede.

It is among the largest centipedes with a maximum length of 20 cm (7.9 in). This centipede is an active, aggressive predator that preys on any animal it can overpower.

== Description ==
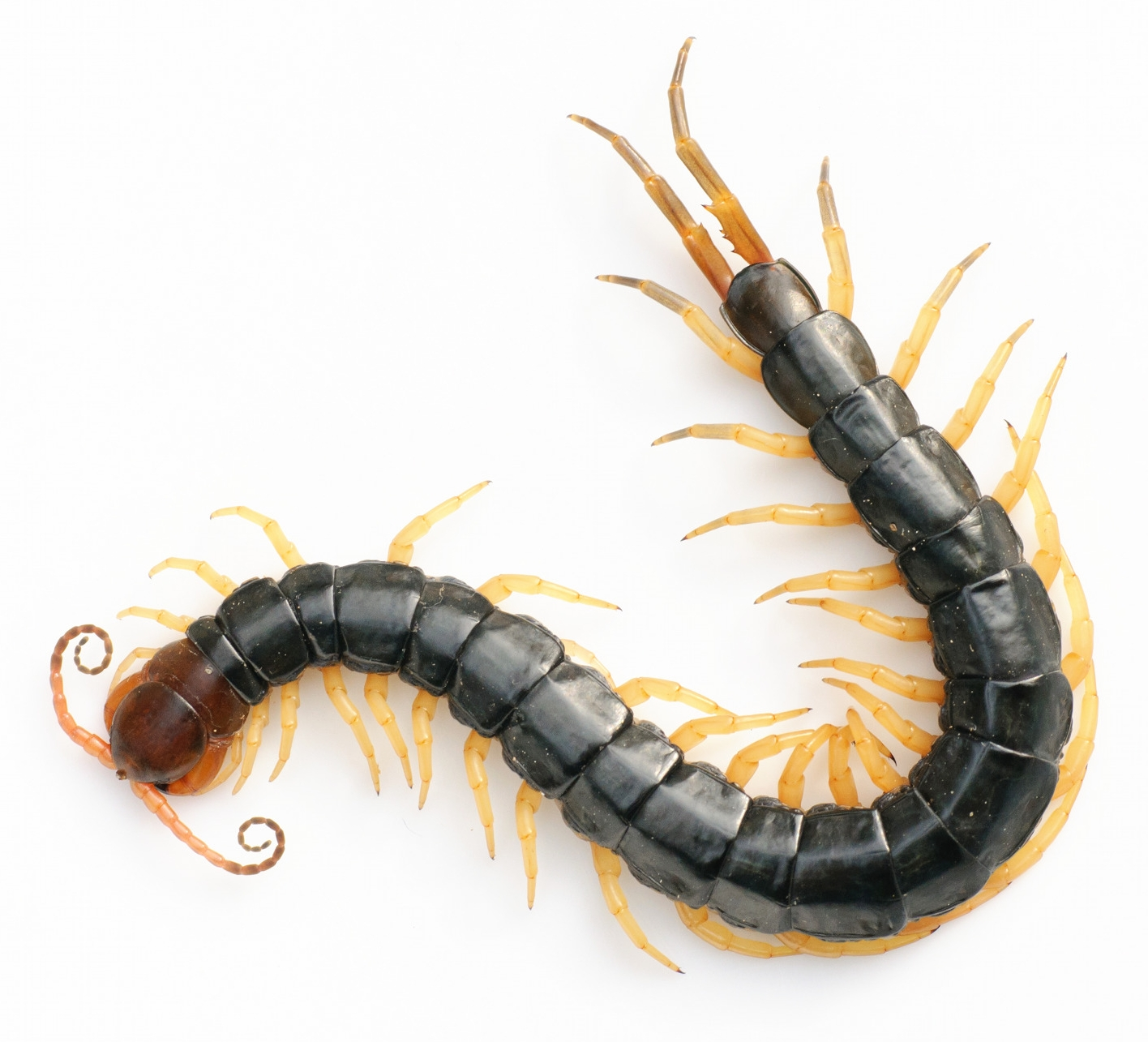
Scolopendra mutilans, formerly a subspecies of S. subspinipes.

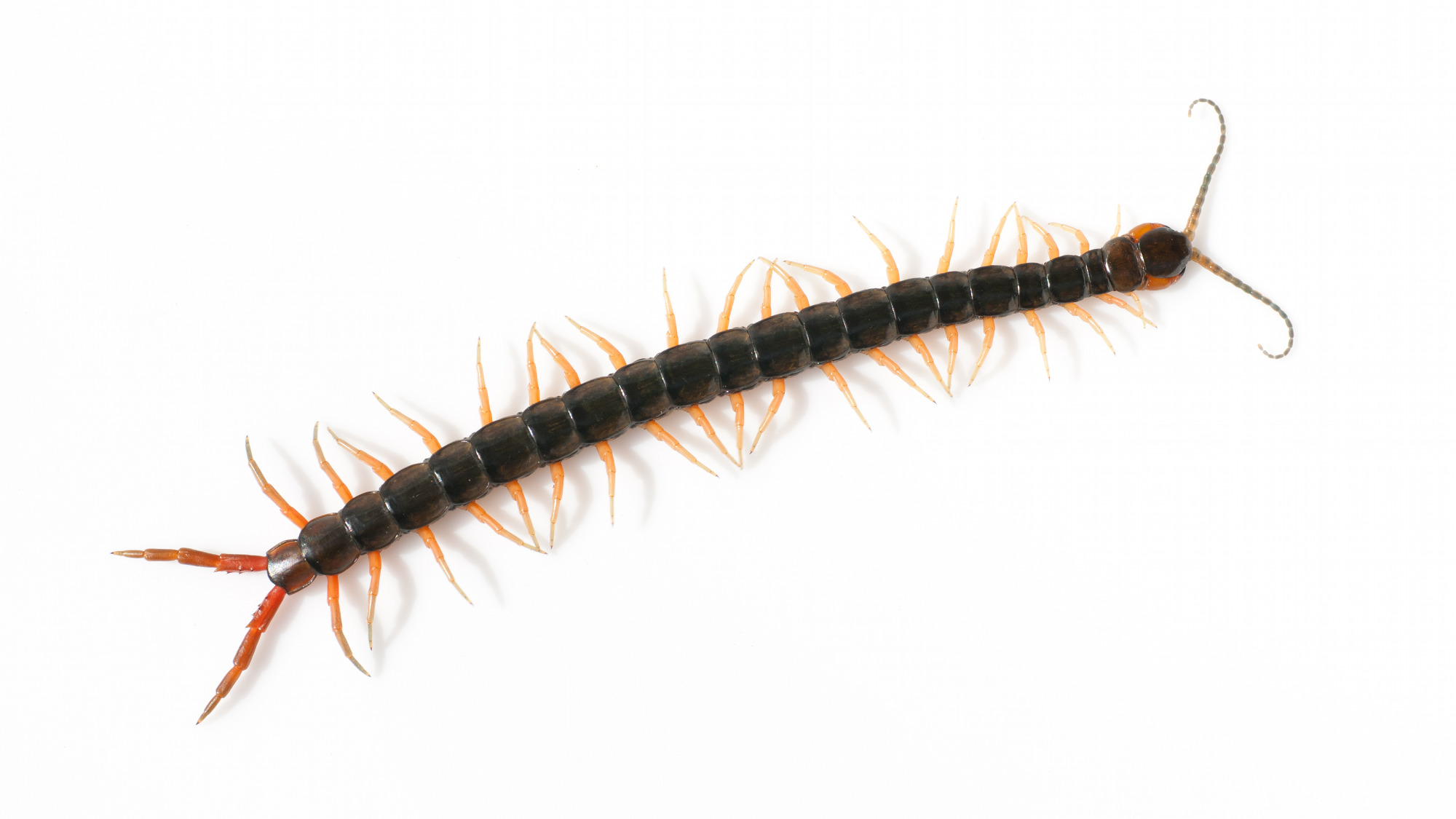
Scolopendra japonica, another former subspecies that has since been elevated to species status.

The species is normally considered to have a maximum length of 20 cm. However, in 2018 a far larger specimen was recovered in Hawaii by Clayton Cambra, who captured what appeared to be a Scolopendra subspinipes that measured 36.6 cm in length.

It has color variations: its body is usually red or reddish brown with yellow or yellow-orange legs. In common with other members of genus Scolopendra, it has 22 body segments, with each segment having one pair of legs. A pair of modified legs known as forcipules or toxicognaths can be found on its head, which is covered by a flat shield and bears a pair of antennae. The toxicognaths are the major tools used by the centipede to kill its prey or for defense, as they have sharp claws that connect to venom glands.

== Diet and behavior ==
Scolopendra subspinipes is an aggressive and nervous arthropod, ready to strike if interfered with and sensitive to vibrations nearby. It preys primarily on arachnids, including spiders, scorpions, and vinegaroons. It is large enough to overpower small vertebrates, such as mice or small reptiles, and will readily attempt to consume them. It tends to try to eat almost every living animal it encounters that is not longer than itself. It seizes prey with its anterior legs and then uses its toxicognaths to inject venom. The prey is held by the centipede's other legs until it is subdued. When defending itself or attacking prey, the centipede uses its entire body, coiling around the animal and holding on with its legs, from which position it can use its toxicognaths to deliver venom.

=== Reproduction ===
The male produces capsules containing mature sperm cells, spermatophores, which are deposited in a reservoir called the spermatheca of the female during mating. The female then fertilizes her immature eggs, oocytes, and deposits them in a dark, protected area. The female lays 50 to 80 eggs, which she vigilantly protects until they hatch and the baby centipedes molt once. If danger is detected, she wraps around her young to keep them safe. The young centipedes molt once each year, and take 3–4 years to attain full adult size. Adults molt once every year. They may live for 10 years or more.

== Venom ==
S. subspinipes venom normally causes extreme pain, among other symptoms. A fatal case was reported in the Philippines in which the centipede bit a 7-year-old girl on her head. She died 29 hours later.

== Human uses ==
S. subspinipes is a popular pet among arthropod hobbyists. The centipede was a traditional food source for Aboriginal Australians.

== Subspecies ==
The number of subspecies of S. subspinipes was historically unclear and varied between authors. Taxonomic characterizations incorporated plastic traits such as color and sulcus structure and the number and position of spines, producing indistinguishable and intergrading subspecies. A 2012 review found that some subspecies were in fact distinct species: S. subspinipes dehaani, S. subspinipes japonica, and S. subspinipes cingulatoides (renamed Scolopendra dawydoffi to avoid confusion with "Scolopendra cingulatoides", a junior synonym of Scolopendra cingulata).

A list of current and former subspecies can be found below.
Former subspecies now considered separate species are denoted with an asterisk (*).
Subspecies now considered synonyms of S. subspinipes are denoted by a double asterisk (**).

- S. s. cingulatoides*
- S. s. dehaani*
- S. s. fulgurans**
- S. s. gastroforeata
- S. s. japonica*
- S. s. mutilans*
- S. s. piceoflava**
- S. s. subspinipes (synonym of S. s. gastroforeata)
- S. s. multidens* (raised to species level by Chao & Chang in 2003)
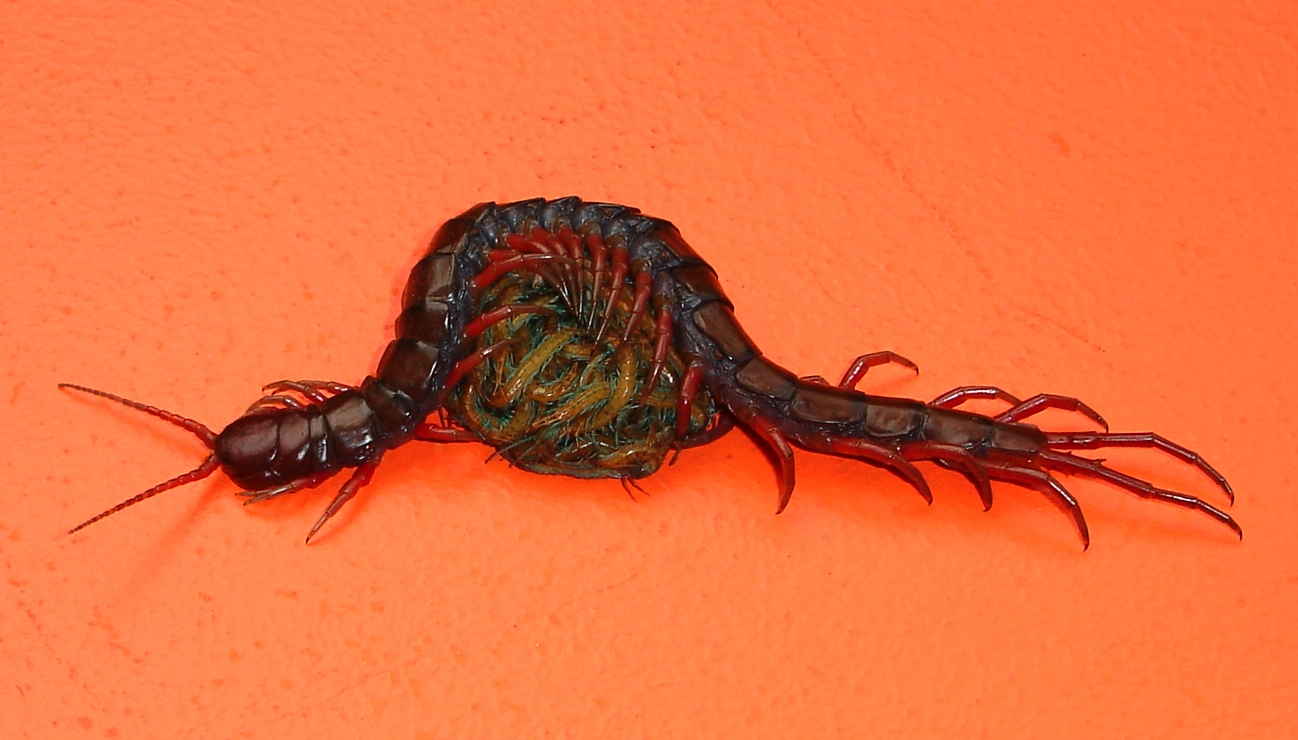
S. subspinipes with offspring

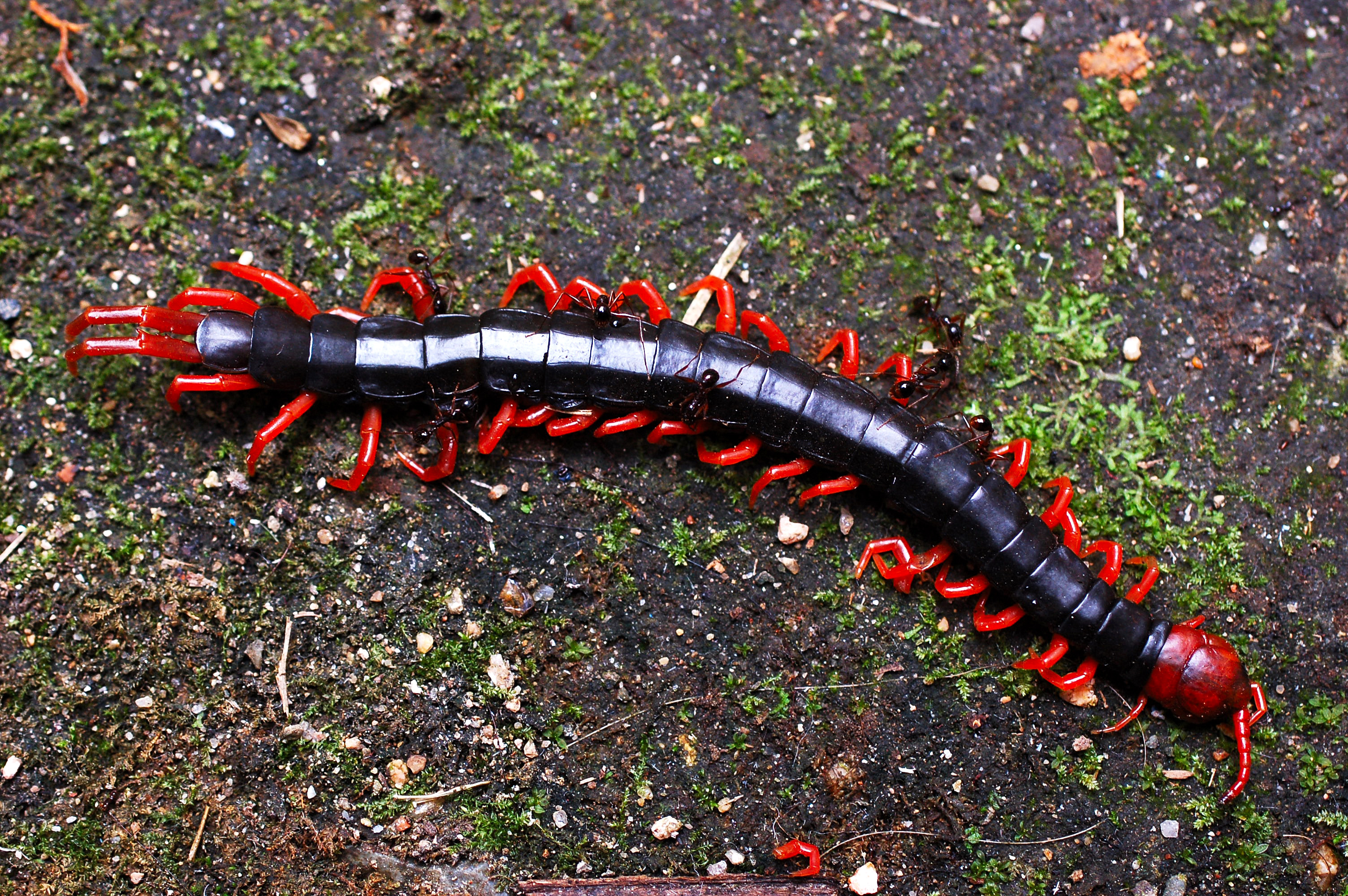
S. mutilans, a former subspecies

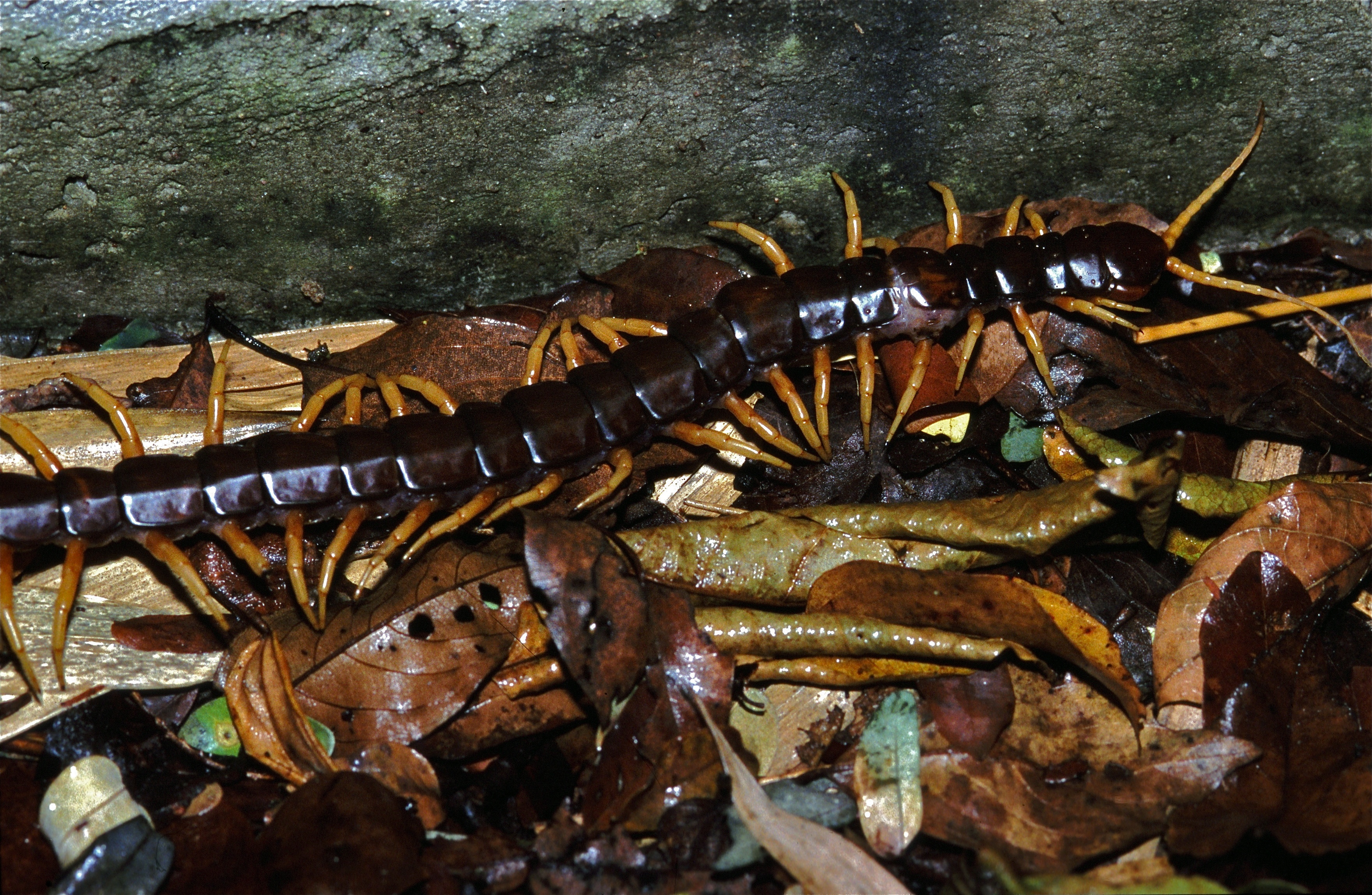
Unidentified Scolopendra sp., possibly S. subspinipes

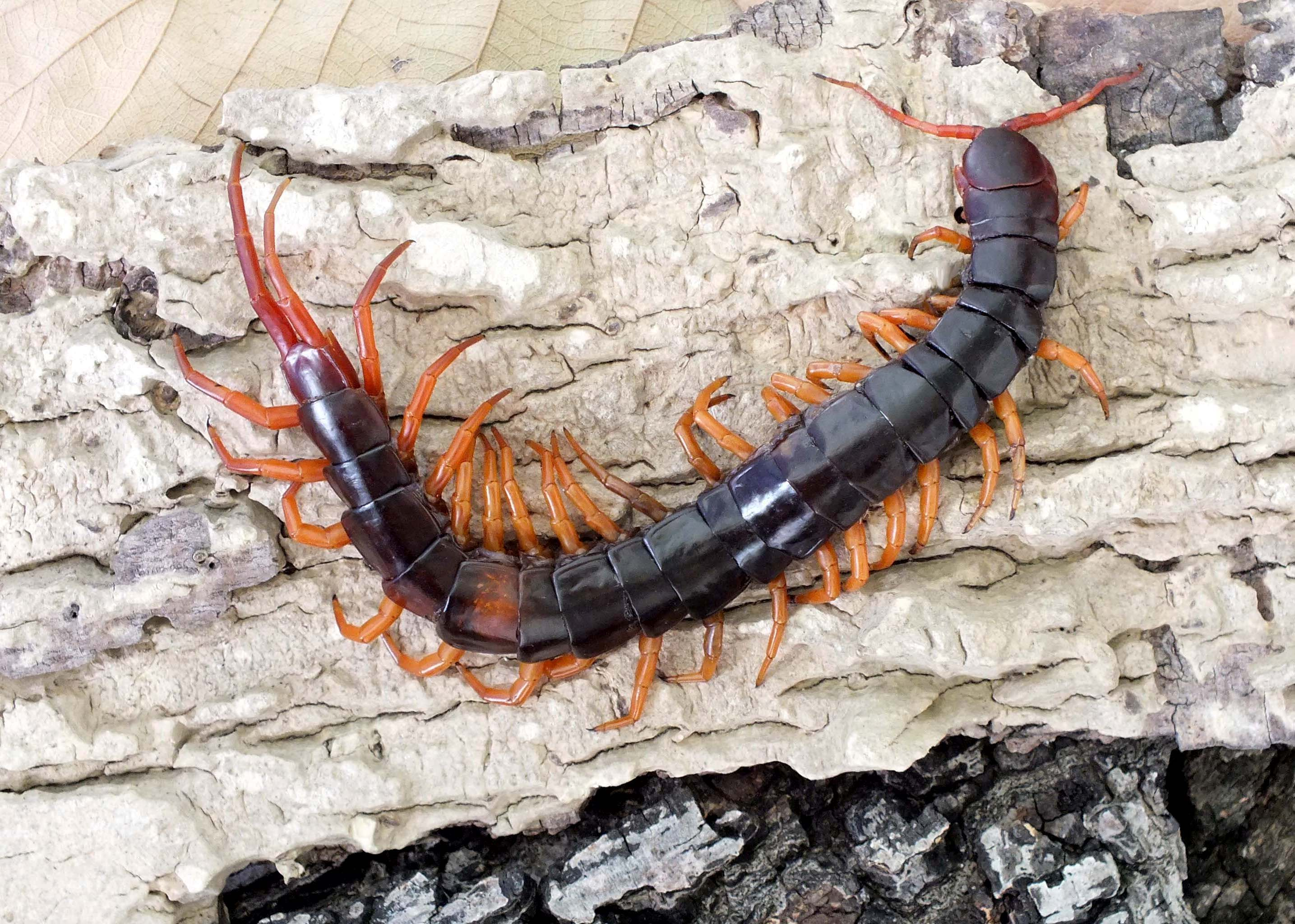
S. dehaani, a former subspecies

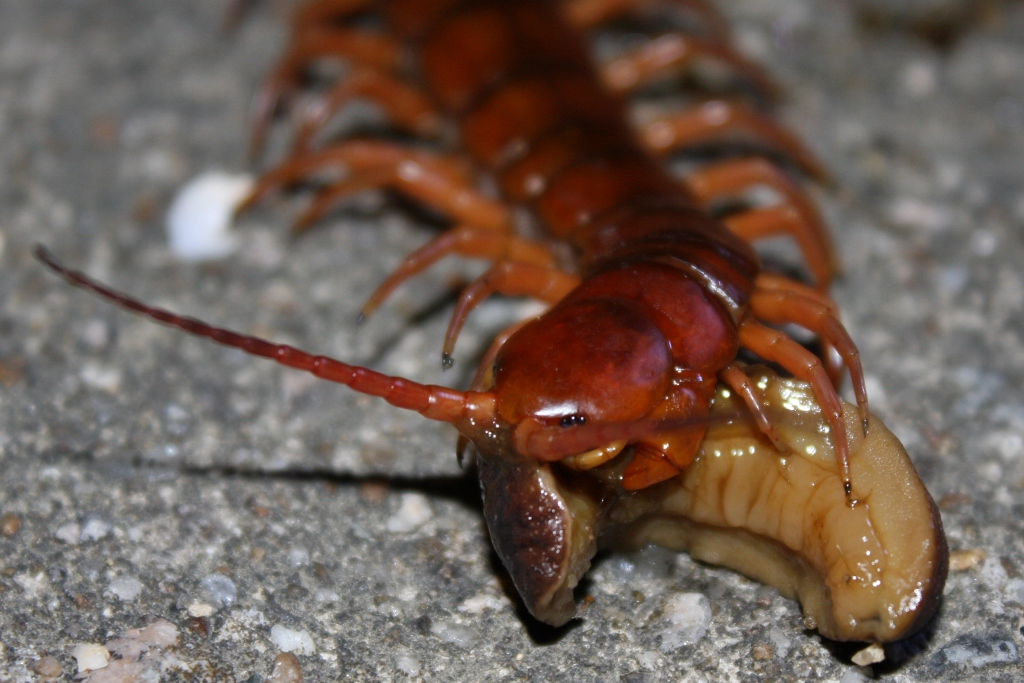
S. dehaani

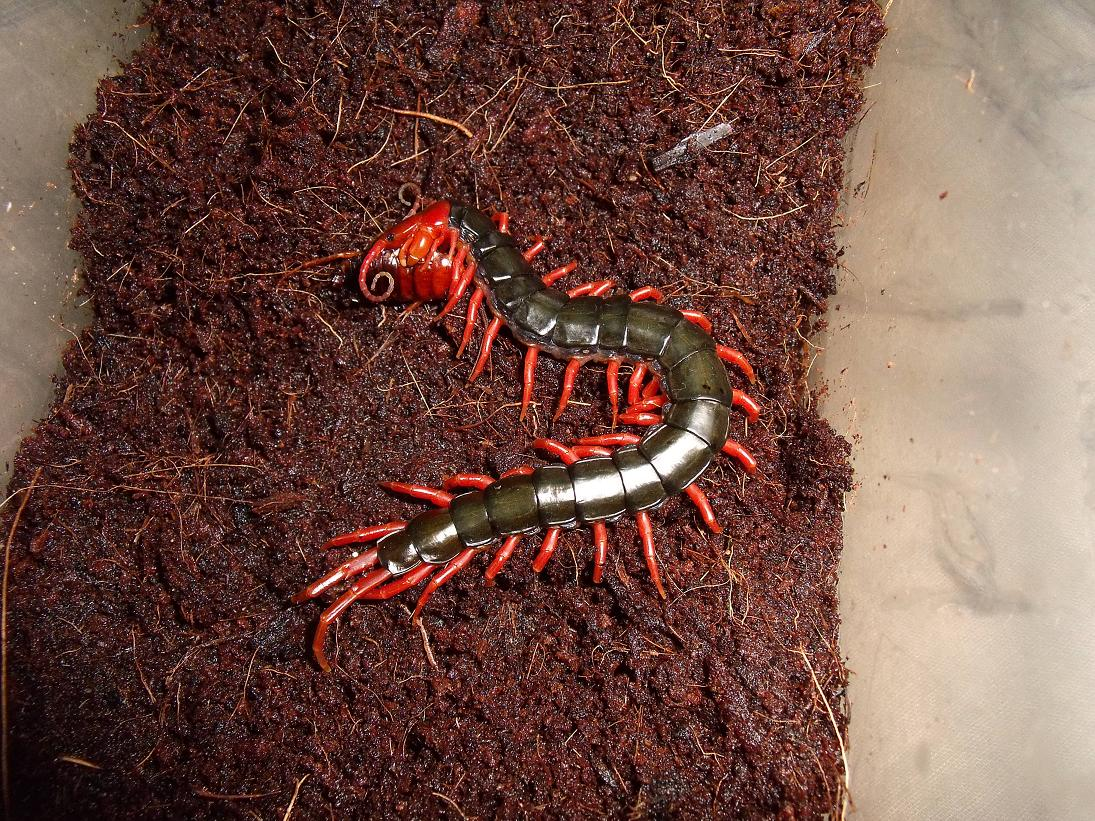
S. mutilans, a former subspecies

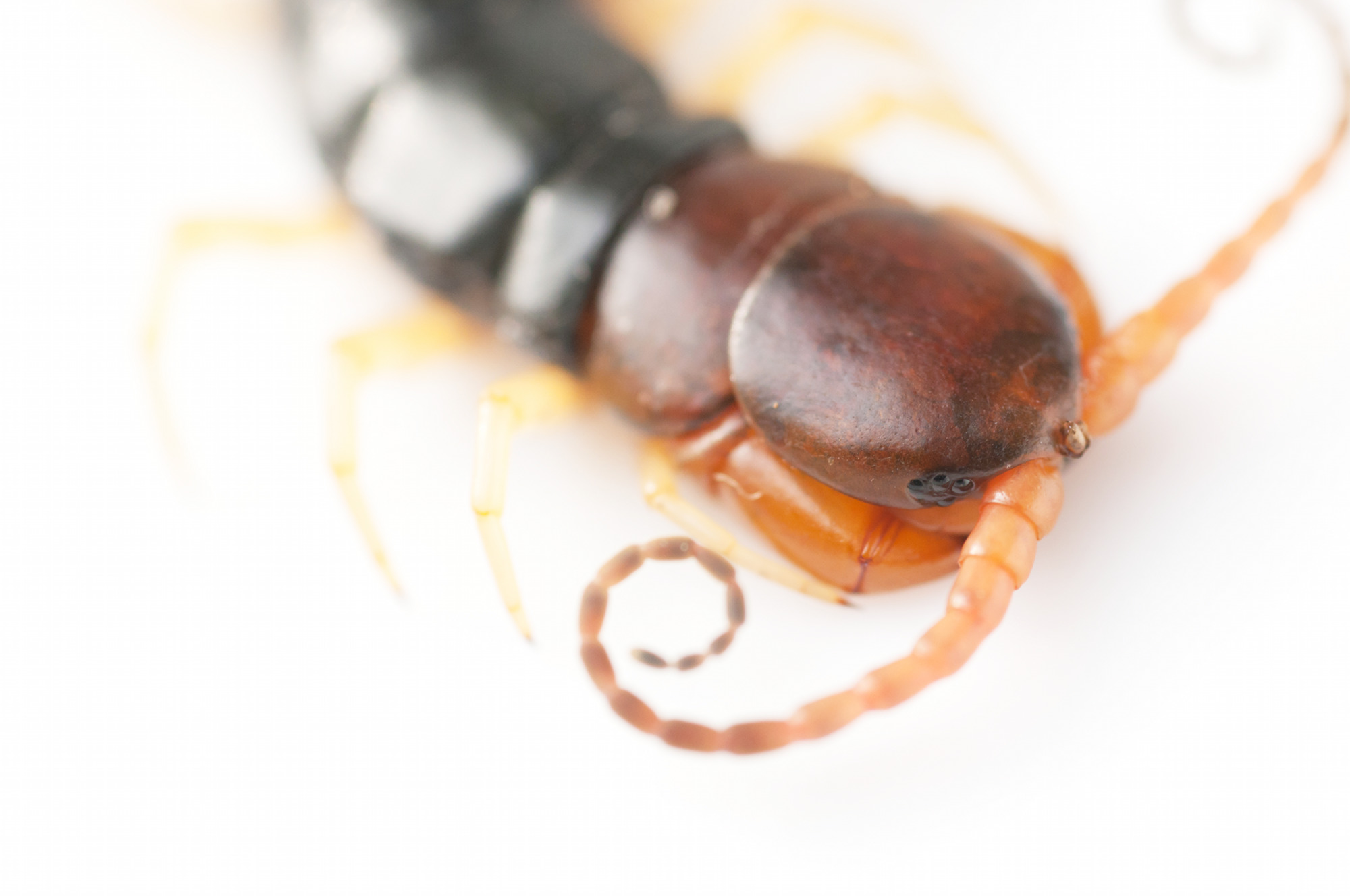
S. mutilans

== See also ==
- Chinese red-headed centipede (Scolopendra mutilans)
- Japanese giant centipede (Scolopendra japonica)
