= Ballophilus clavicornis =

Scientific classification
- Domain: Eukaryota
- Kingdom: Animalia
- Phylum: Arthropoda
- Subphylum: Myriapoda
- Class: Chilopoda
- Order: Geophilomorpha
- Family: Ballophilidae
- Genus: Ballophilus
- Species: B. clavicornis

Binomial name
- Ballophilus clavicornis Cook, 1896

Species of arthropod

Ballophilus clavicornis is a species of arthropod in the genus Ballophilus. It is found in Liberia. The original description of this species is based on specimens with 63 to 73 pairs of legs.
