= Ballophilus insperatus =

Scientific classification
- Domain: Eukaryota
- Kingdom: Animalia
- Phylum: Arthropoda
- Subphylum: Myriapoda
- Class: Chilopoda
- Order: Geophilomorpha
- Family: Ballophilidae
- Genus: Ballophilus
- Species: B. insperatus

Binomial name
- Ballophilus insperatus Lawrence, 1960

Species of centipede

Ballophilus insperatus is a species of centipede in the genus Ballophilus. It is found in Madagascar. The original description of this species is based on specimens with 55 or 57 pairs of legs.
