= Ballophilus filiformis =

Scientific classification
- Domain: Eukaryota
- Kingdom: Animalia
- Phylum: Arthropoda
- Subphylum: Myriapoda
- Class: Chilopoda
- Order: Geophilomorpha
- Family: Ballophilidae
- Genus: Ballophilus
- Species: B. filiformis

Binomial name
- Ballophilus filiformis Attems, 1953

Species of centipede

Ballophilus filiformis is a species of centipede in the genus Ballophilus and is found in Democratic Republic of the Congo. The original description of this species is based on pale yellow specimens reaching 17 mm in length with 49 or 51 pairs of legs.
