= Ballophilus differens =

Scientific classification
- Kingdom: Animalia
- Phylum: Arthropoda
- Subphylum: Myriapoda
- Class: Chilopoda
- Order: Geophilomorpha
- Family: Ballophilidae
- Genus: Ballophilus
- Species: B. differens

Binomial name
- Ballophilus differens Chamberlin, 1951

Species of centipede

Ballophilus differens is a species of centipede in the genus Ballophilus. It is found in Angola. The original description of this species is based on specimens reaching up to 15 mm in length with 47 pairs if legs.
