= Ballophilus mauritianus =

Scientific classification
- Domain: Eukaryota
- Kingdom: Animalia
- Phylum: Arthropoda
- Subphylum: Myriapoda
- Class: Chilopoda
- Order: Geophilomorpha
- Family: Ballophilidae
- Genus: Ballophilus
- Species: B. mauritianus

Binomial name
- Ballophilus mauritianus Verhoeff K. W., 1939

Species of centipede

Ballophilus mauritianus is a species of centipede in the genus Ballophilus and is found in Mauritius. The original description of this species is based on specimens measuring 28 mm to 30 mm in length with 51 pairs of legs.
