= Ballophilus fijiensis =

Scientific classification
- Domain: Eukaryota
- Kingdom: Animalia
- Phylum: Arthropoda
- Subphylum: Myriapoda
- Class: Chilopoda
- Order: Geophilomorpha
- Family: Ballophilidae
- Genus: Ballophilus
- Species: B. fijiensis

Binomial name
- Ballophilus fijiensis Chamberlin R. 1920

Species of arthropod

Ballophilus fijiensis is a species of centipede in the genus Ballophilus. It is found in Fiji. The original description of this species is based on specimens ranging up to 52 mm in length with 81 to 91 pairs of legs.
