= Ballophilus granulosus =

Scientific classification
- Domain: Eukaryota
- Kingdom: Animalia
- Phylum: Arthropoda
- Subphylum: Myriapoda
- Class: Chilopoda
- Order: Geophilomorpha
- Family: Ballophilidae
- Genus: Ballophilus
- Species: B. granulosus

Binomial name
- Ballophilus granulosus Attems, 1938

Species of centipede

Ballophilus granulosus is a species of centipede in the genus Ballophilus. It has two subspecies: Ballophilus granulosus granulosus and Ballophilus granulosus holotrichus. The original description of B. g. granulosus is based on male specimens measuring 45 mm in length with 77 to 83 pairs of legs. Specimens of B. g. holotrichus have 65 to 85 pairs of legs and differ from B. g. granulosus in having bristles on all tergites rather than on only some.
