= Ityphilus microcephalus =

Scientific classification
- Kingdom: Animalia
- Phylum: Arthropoda
- Subphylum: Myriapoda
- Class: Chilopoda
- Order: Geophilomorpha
- Family: Ballophilidae
- Genus: Ityphilus
- Species: I. microcephalus

Binomial name
- Ityphilus microcephalus (Brolemann, 1909)

Synonyms
- Thalthybius microcephalus Attems, 1900

Species of centipede

Ityphilus microcephalus is a species of centipede in the Ballophilidae family. It was described in 1909 by French myriapodologist Henry Wilfred Brolemann. This species is yellow, can reach 47 mm in length, and can have as few as 67 pairs of legs (in males) or as many as 79 leg pairs (in females).

== Distribution ==
The species occurs in Micronesia. The type locality is Marche, Northern Mariana Islands.
