= Ballophilus giganteus =

Scientific classification
- Domain: Eukaryota
- Kingdom: Animalia
- Phylum: Arthropoda
- Subphylum: Myriapoda
- Class: Chilopoda
- Order: Geophilomorpha
- Family: Ballophilidae
- Genus: Ballophilus
- Species: B. giganteus

Binomial name
- Ballophilus giganteus Demange, 1963

Species of centipede

Ballophilus giganteus is a species of centipede in the genus Ballophilus. It is found in Ivory Coast. This species is dark brown. The original description of this species is based on seven males specimens ranging from 51 mm to 67 mm in length with 75 to 87 pairs of legs and four female specimens ranging from 63 mm to 75 mm in length with 79 to 91 leg pairs.
