= Ballophilus pallidus =

Scientific classification
- Kingdom: Animalia
- Phylum: Arthropoda
- Subphylum: Myriapoda
- Class: Chilopoda
- Order: Geophilomorpha
- Family: Ballophilidae
- Genus: Ballophilus
- Species: B. pallidus

Binomial name
- Ballophilus pallidus Attems, 1938

Species of centipede

Ballophilus pallidus is a species of soil centipede in the clade once accepted as the family Ballophilidae, but now regarded as a possible subfamily (Ballophilinae) in the family Schendylidae. This centipede is notable for its small size, reaching only 11 mm in length, and modest number of legs, with as few as 37 pairs, the minimum number recorded in the clade formerly known as Ballophilidae. This species is found in Vietnam and Cambodia.

== Discovery and distribution ==
This species was first described in 1938 by the Austrian myriapodologist Carl Attems. He based the original description of this species on several specimens collected by the zoologist Constantine Dawydoff from 1930 to 1935. Dawydoff found these specimens in Vietnam, in dense tropical forests in the province of Tây Ninh and in the former province of Phú Yên (now part of Đắk Lắk province). Seven syntypes, including six males and one female, are deposited in the Natural History Museum in Vienna. After the discovery of this centipede, Dawydoff found more specimens of this species in southern Vietnam, in the province of Cà Mau and in the former province of Sóc Trăng (now part of Cần Thơ province), from 1938 to 1939. This species is found in Cambodia as well as Vietnam.

== Taxonomy ==
Although the placement of this centipede in the genus Ballophilus has not been revised since the original description of this species, authorities have disagreed on the placement of this genus in a family. When this genus was first described in 1896 by the American biologist Orator F. Cook, he placed this genus in the family Ballophilidae, which he introduced to contain this new genus. Attems and other authorities, however, rejected the taxonomic rank proposed by Cook, instead placing Ballophilus in a subfamily (Ballophilinae) within the family Schendylidae. Accordingly, Attems placed B. pallidus along with other species of Ballophilus in the family Schendylidae. Nevertheless, others placed this genus in Ballophilidae, which they accepted as a separate family, a rank that eventually gained broad support from authorities. Thus, other authorities placed B. pallidus in the family Ballophilidae.

In 2014, however, a phylogenetic analysis of the order Geophilomorpha using both morphological and molecular data found representatives of the family Ballophilidae, including species of Ballophilus, nested among species of the family Schendylidae. To avoid paraphyly of the family Schendylidae with respect to Ballophilidae, authorities dismissed Ballophilidae as a separate family. Accordingly, authorities now place the species formerly contained in the family Ballophilidae, including B. pallidus, in the family Schendylidae instead, sometimes in Ballophilinae as a possible subfamily. Nevertheless, some references still place B. pallidus in Ballophilidae, which they accept as a valid family.

== Description ==
Males of this species feature either 37 or 39 pairs of legs, whereas the female features 41 leg pairs. This centipede is a pale yellowish white. This species is very small, reaching only 11 mm in length. The head is rounded and about as wide as long. The distal segments of each antennae form the shape of a club and are covered in dense but short setae. Each article of the forcipule lacks teeth, and the claw of the forcipule is slender. On each leg-bearing segment, the main tergite features two rows of setae, whereas the pretergite (short sclerite in front of the main tergite) features only one row of setae. The sternites of the leg-bearing segments feature ventral pores starting from the second segment, but the three sternites in front of the last leg-bearing segment lack pore fields. The basal element of each of the ultimate legs (coxopleuron) features two pores. The most distal article of each of the ultimate legs is conical and lacks a claw. The telson features two small anal pores.

This centipede exhibits many traits shared by other species of Ballophilus. For example, like other species in this genus, this species features a short head and antennae shaped like clubs. Furthermore, like other species in this genus, this species features sternites with pore fields and ultimate legs without claws.

This centipede shares a more distinctive set of traits with another species in the same genus, B. flavescens, which is also found in Vietnam and Cambodia. For example, both of these species feature a pale yellowish body with two pores on each coxopleuron and two anal pores on the telson. Furthermore, both species lack pore fields on the three sternites in front of the last leg-bearing segment.

These two species can be distinguished, however, based on other traits. For example, the species B. flavescens is larger, reaching 21 mm in length, and features more legs, with 63 to 69 leg pairs. Furthermore, the main tergites feature four transverse rows of setae in B. flavescens but only two rows of setae in B. pallidus, and the tergites and sternites feature a polygonal pattern of reticulation in B. flavescens but not in B. pallidus.
