= Ballophilus tercrux =

Scientific classification
- Domain: Eukaryota
- Kingdom: Animalia
- Phylum: Arthropoda
- Subphylum: Myriapoda
- Class: Chilopoda
- Order: Geophilomorpha
- Family: Ballophilidae
- Genus: Ballophilus
- Species: B. tercrux

Binomial name
- Ballophilus tercrux Würmli, 1972

Species of centipede

Ballophilus tercrux is a species of centipede in the genus Ballophilus and is found on the island of Sumba in Indonesia. The original description of this species is based on a female specimen measuring 25 mm in length with 75 pairs of legs.
