= Ballophilus peruanus =

Scientific classification
- Domain: Eukaryota
- Kingdom: Animalia
- Phylum: Arthropoda
- Subphylum: Myriapoda
- Class: Chilopoda
- Order: Geophilomorpha
- Family: Ballophilidae
- Genus: Ballophilus
- Species: B. peruanus

Binomial name
- Ballophilus peruanus Verhoeff, 1941

Species of centipede

Ballophilus peruanus is a species of centipede in the genus Ballophilus. It is found in Peru. The original description of this species is based on a specimen measuring 12 mm in length with 43 pairs of legs.
