= Ballophilus paucipes =

Scientific classification
- Kingdom: Animalia
- Phylum: Arthropoda
- Subphylum: Myriapoda
- Class: Chilopoda
- Order: Geophilomorpha
- Family: Ballophilidae
- Genus: Ballophilus
- Species: B. paucipes

Binomial name
- Ballophilus paucipes Chamberlin, 1920

Species of centipede

Ballophilus paucipes is a species of centipede in the Schendylidae family. It was described in 1920 by American myriapodologist Ralph Vary Chamberlin.

== Description ==
The original description of this species is based on a dark brown specimen measuring 16 mm in length with 55 pairs of legs.

== Distribution ==
The species occurs in Fiji. The type locality is Nadarivatu.
