= Ballophilus conservatus =

Scientific classification
- Kingdom: Animalia
- Phylum: Arthropoda
- Subphylum: Myriapoda
- Class: Chilopoda
- Order: Geophilomorpha
- Family: Ballophilidae
- Genus: Ballophilus
- Species: B. conservatus

Binomial name
- Ballophilus conservatus Chamberlin, 1944

Species of centipede

Ballophilus conservatus is a species of centipede in the genus Ballophilus. It is found on the island of Java. The original description of this species is based on a specimen measuring about 15 mm in length with 69 pairs of legs.
