= Ballophilus neocaledonicus =

Scientific classification
- Domain: Eukaryota
- Kingdom: Animalia
- Phylum: Arthropoda
- Subphylum: Myriapoda
- Class: Chilopoda
- Order: Geophilomorpha
- Family: Ballophilidae
- Genus: Ballophilus
- Species: B. neocaledonicus

Binomial name
- Ballophilus neocaledonicus Verhoeff K. W., 1939

Species of centipede

Ballophilus neocaledonicus is a species of centipede in the genus Ballophilus. It is found in New Caledonia. The original description of this species is based on specimens measuring up to 41 mm in length with 61 to 79 pairs of legs.
