= Ballophilus comastes =

Scientific classification
- Domain: Eukaryota
- Kingdom: Animalia
- Phylum: Arthropoda
- Subphylum: Myriapoda
- Class: Chilopoda
- Order: Geophilomorpha
- Family: Ballophilidae
- Genus: Ballophilus
- Species: B. comastes

Binomial name
- Ballophilus comastes Crabill, 1971

Species of arthropod

Ballophilus comastes is a species of arthropod in the genus Ballophilus. It is found in the Philippines. The original description of this species is based on a specimen with 49 pairs of legs.
