= Ballophilus kraepelini =

Scientific classification
- Domain: Eukaryota
- Kingdom: Animalia
- Phylum: Arthropoda
- Subphylum: Myriapoda
- Class: Chilopoda
- Order: Geophilomorpha
- Family: Ballophilidae
- Genus: Ballophilus
- Species: B. kraepelini

Binomial name
- Ballophilus kraepelini Attems, 1907

Species of centipede

Ballophilus kraepelini is a species of centipede in the genus Ballophilus. It is found on the island of Java. The original description of this species is based on specimens with 45 or 47 pairs of legs.
