= Ballophilus alluaudi =

Scientific classification
- Domain: Eukaryota
- Kingdom: Animalia
- Phylum: Arthropoda
- Subphylum: Myriapoda
- Class: Chilopoda
- Order: Geophilomorpha
- Family: Ballophilidae
- Genus: Ballophilus
- Species: B. alluaudi

Binomial name
- Ballophilus alluaudi Ribaut, 1914

Species of centipede

Ballophilus alluaudi is a species of centipede in the genus Ballophilus. It is found in Kenya, Somalia, South Africa, Uganda, Zambia, and Zimbabwe. The original description of this species is based on male specimens with 51 pairs of legs and female specimens with 53 to 57 leg pairs. The adult female specimen measures 29 mm in length, whereas the males range from 9 mm to 19 mm in length.
