= Ballophilus latisternus =

Scientific classification
- Domain: Eukaryota
- Kingdom: Animalia
- Phylum: Arthropoda
- Subphylum: Myriapoda
- Class: Chilopoda
- Order: Geophilomorpha
- Family: Ballophilidae
- Genus: Ballophilus
- Species: B. latisternus

Binomial name
- Ballophilus latisternus Lawrence, 1960

Species of centipede

Ballophilus latisternus is a species of centipede in the genus Ballophilus. It is found in Madagascar. The original description of this species is based on a male holotype measuring 20 mm in length with 47 pairs of legs.
