= Ballophilus braunsi =

Scientific classification
- Domain: Eukaryota
- Kingdom: Animalia
- Phylum: Arthropoda
- Subphylum: Myriapoda
- Class: Chilopoda
- Order: Geophilomorpha
- Family: Ballophilidae
- Genus: Ballophilus
- Species: B. braunsi

Binomial name
- Ballophilus braunsi Silvestri, 1907

Species of arthropod

Ballophilus braunsi is a species of arthropod in the genus Ballophilus. It is found in South Africa. It has two subspecies: Ballophilus braunsi braunsi and Ballophilus braunsi nimbanus. The original description of this species is based on female specimens with 59 or 61 pairs of legs, but males of this species can have as few as 57 leg pairs.
