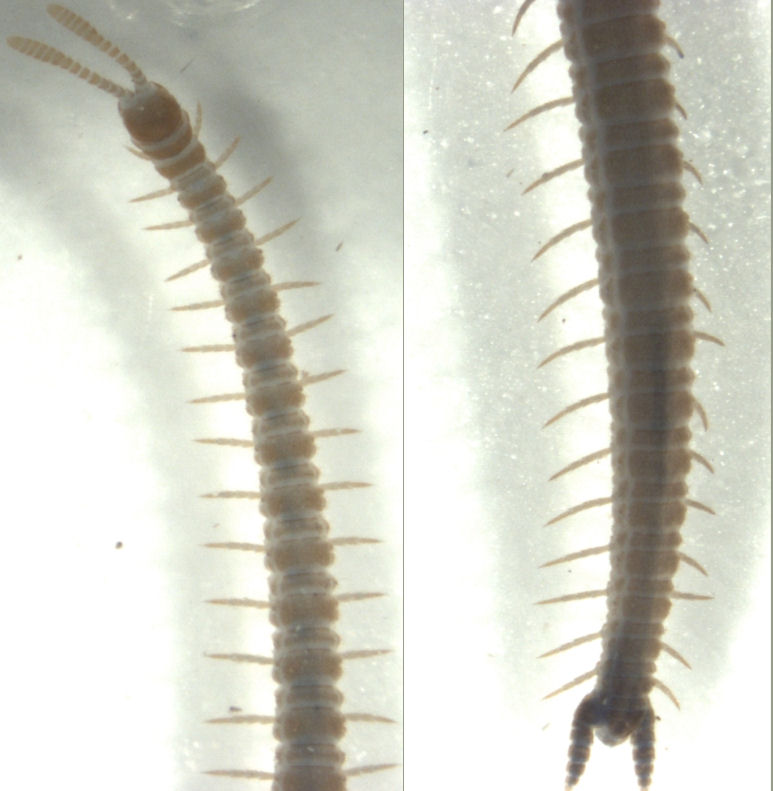

Scientific classification
- Kingdom: Animalia
- Phylum: Arthropoda
- Subphylum: Myriapoda
- Class: Chilopoda
- Order: Geophilomorpha
- Family: Ballophilidae
- Genus: Ballophilus
- Species: B. hounselli

Binomial name
- Ballophilus hounselli Archey, 1936

= Ballophilus hounselli =

Species of arthropods

Ballophilus hounselli is a species of centipede in the genus Ballophilus. It is found in New Zealand. The original description of this species is based on specimens ranging from 16 mm to 40 mm in length with 53 to 71 segments.
