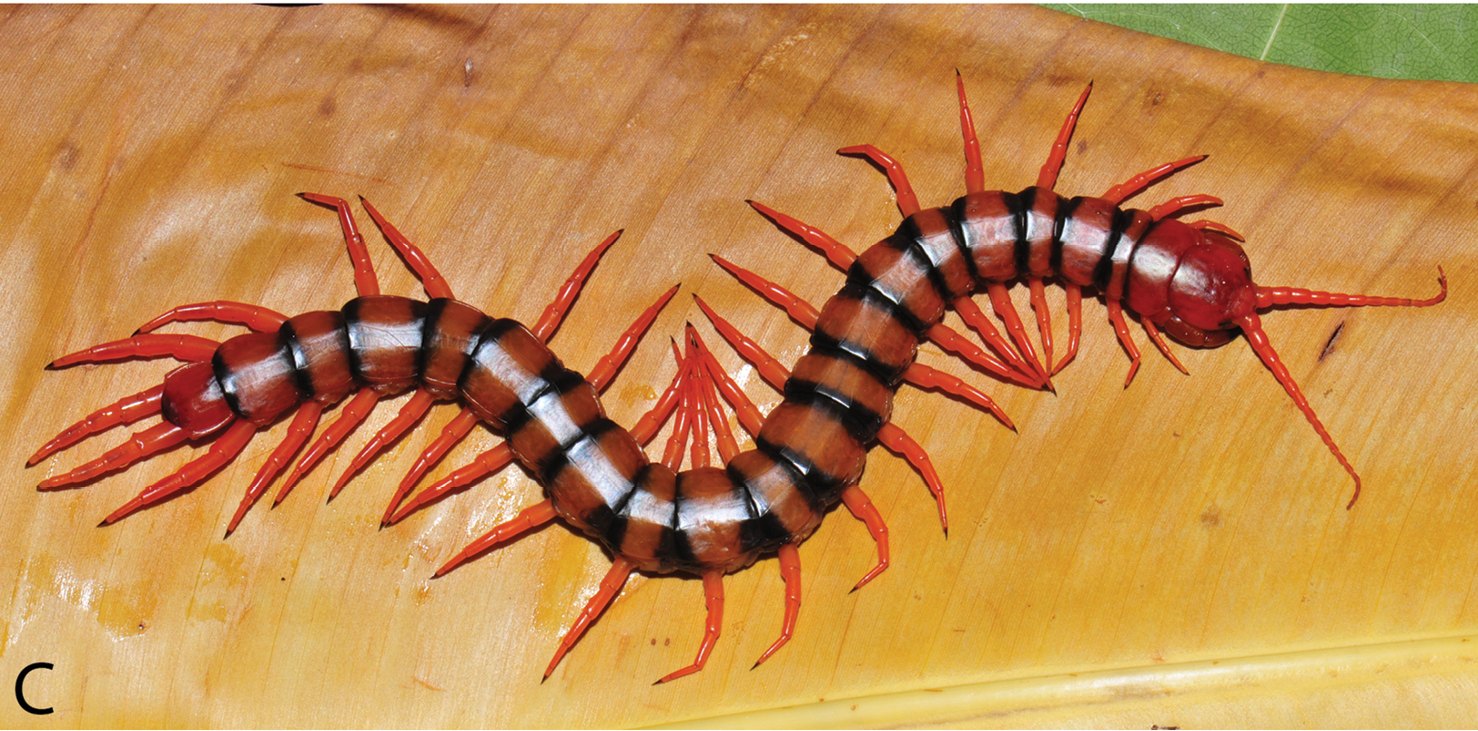

Scientific classification
- Kingdom: Animalia
- Phylum: Arthropoda
- Subphylum: Myriapoda
- Class: Chilopoda
- Order: Scolopendromorpha
- Family: Scolopendridae
- Genus: Scolopendra
- Species: S. dawydoffi

Binomial name
- Scolopendra dawydoffi Kronmüller, 2012

Synonyms
- Scolopendra subspinipes cingulatoides

= Scolopendra dawydoffi =

Species of centipede

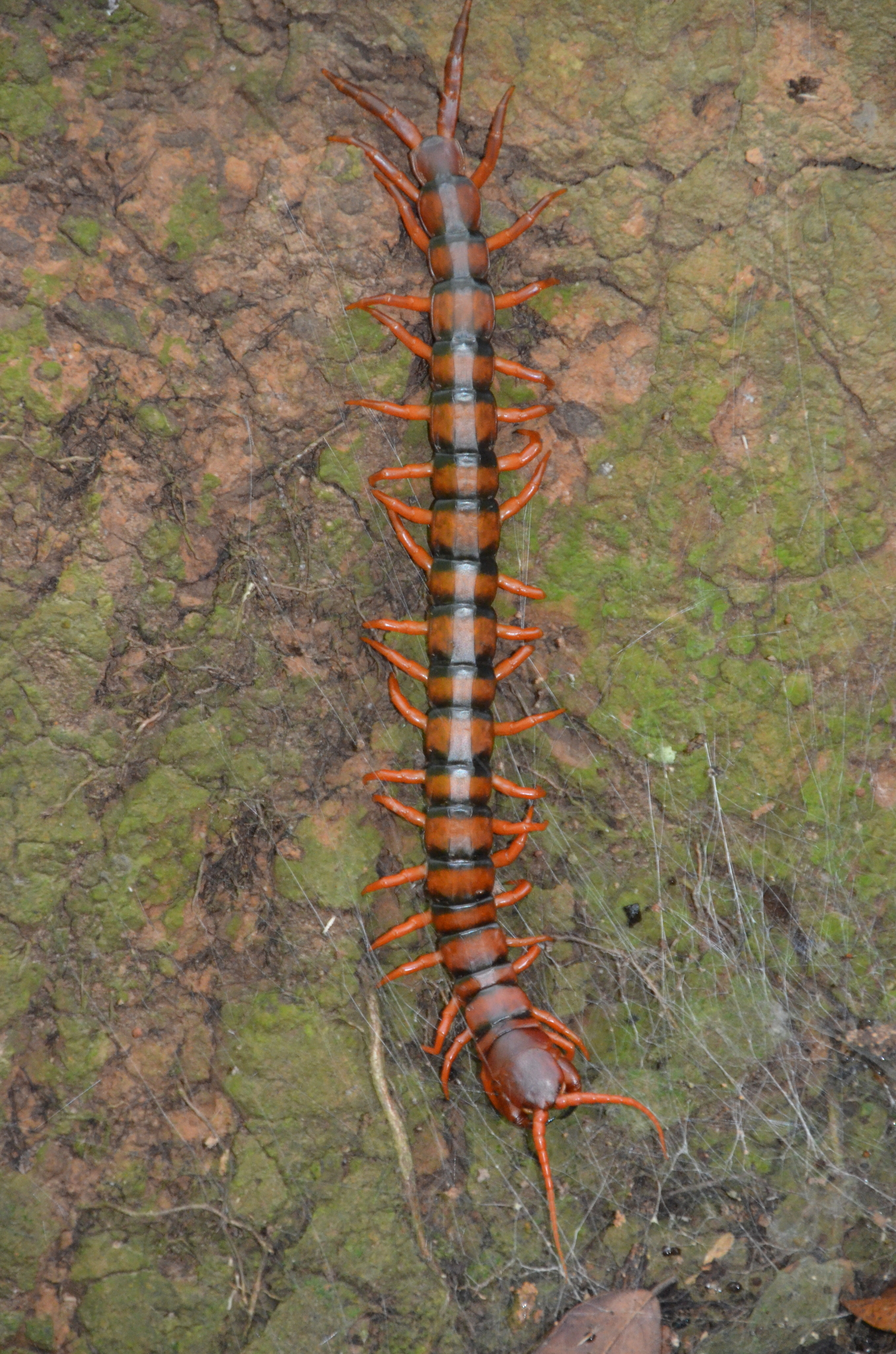

Scolopendra dawydoffi is a species of large Scolopendrid centipede found in Southeast Asia, specifically in Laos, Vietnam, Thailand, and Malaysia. It has bright reddish-orange and black colouration (and should thus not be confused with S. hardwickei), and can grow up to and beyond 16 cm in length.

== Appearance and behaviour ==
Scolopendra dawydoffi has bright reddish-orange colouration, with dark bands on the ends of its tergites. The antennae are divided into 17-18 segments (articles). It can live for 2-3 years.

Scolopendra dawydoffi, like all centipedes, is predatory, and, like most large centipedes, is primarily insectivorous. However, it has been recorded feeding on snakes, specifically Sibynophis triangularis, while the snake was laying its eggs.

== Taxonomy ==
Scolopendra dawydoffi was first (incompletely) described in 1938 by Carl Attems as Scolopendra subspinipes cingulatoides. He said that S. s. cingulatoides "unites the taxonomical characteristics of Scolopendra subspinipes [Leach, 1815] and Scolopendra cingulata [Latreille, 1829]".

S. subspinipes cingulatoides was elevated to species level and renamed S. dawydoffi to avoid confusion with Scolopendra cingulatoides, a junior synonym of Scolopendra cingulata in a 2012 taxonomic review. The new species name is in honour of Dr C Dawydoff, the collector of the species.
