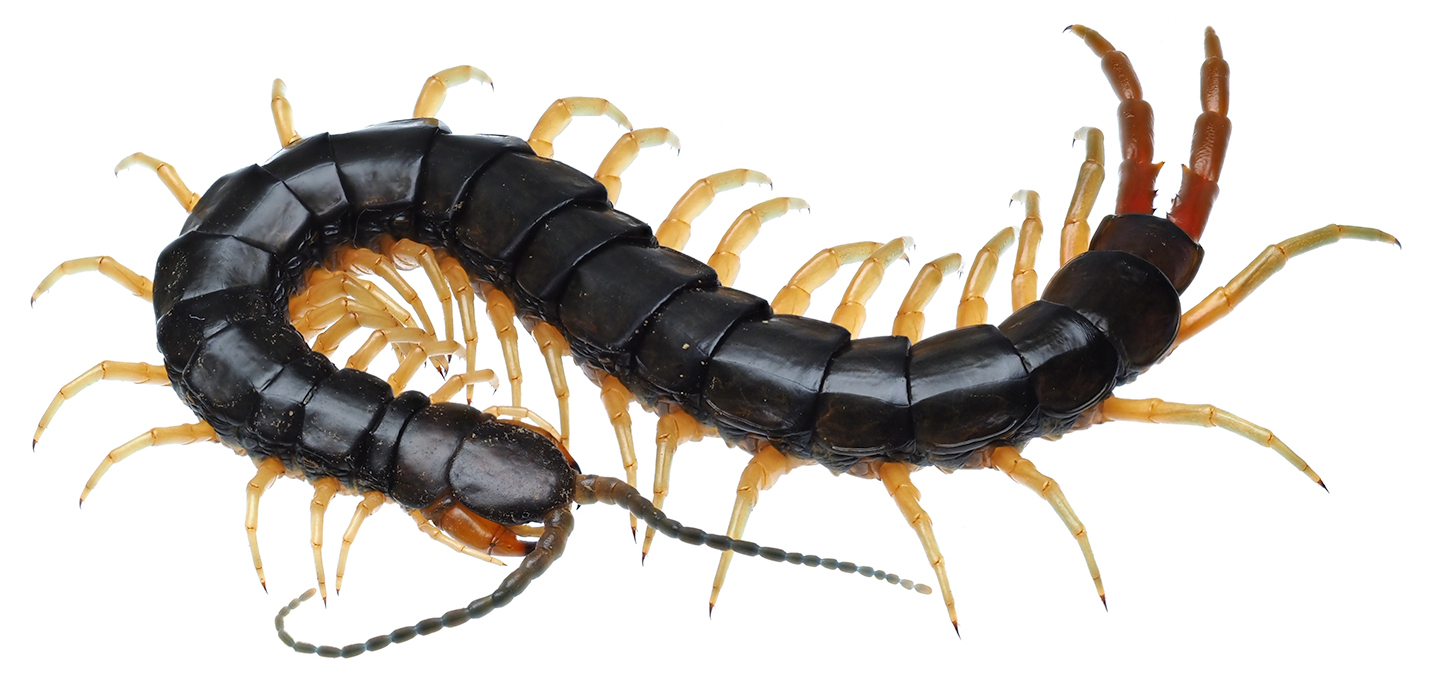

Scientific classification
- Domain: Eukaryota
- Kingdom: Animalia
- Phylum: Arthropoda
- Subphylum: Myriapoda
- Class: Chilopoda
- Order: Scolopendromorpha
- Family: Scolopendridae
- Genus: Scolopendra
- Species: S. japonica

Binomial name
- Scolopendra japonica Koch, 1878

Synonyms
- Otostigmus puncticeps Attems, 1953 Otostigmus politoides Attems, 1953

= Scolopendra japonica =

Centipede species

Scolopendra japonica, formerly classified as Scolopendra subspinipes japonica, is a species of scolopendrid centipede mostly found in Japan, although specimens have been reported in other parts of Eastern Asia such as China, Taiwan, Myanmar, Cambodia, and Laos. They usually grow between 7.5 and 13 centimetres in length. It is known by the common names Japanese giant centipede and blue-head centipede.

== Habitat and behaviour ==
S. japonica prefers shaded woods and greenspaces, both flat and mountainous. Like most centipedes, it is nocturnal. S. japonica preys mostly on insects and arachnids including cockroaches, spiders, and crickets. During the day, they hide under leaf litter, rocks, or fallen logs, but sometimes rest on the tips of tree branches. They can be found in residential areas, and can sometimes even enter the home.

== Taxonomy ==
S. japonica was first described by Koch in 1878. In 1903, Kraeplin reclassified it as a subspecies of Scolopendra subspinipes. In 2003, it was suggested by Jui-Lung Chao and Hsueh-Wen Chang that it could be a subspecies or geographic variation of Scolopendra multidens. In 2012, it was elevated back to species level by Christian Kronmüller.

== Morphology ==
Two colour morphs have been reported in S. japonica, although the only significant variation is in leg colour, which ranges from yellow-brown to red with almost greenish tips. The body is usually dark greenish to brown, and the fangs are tipped with black. The head and first tergite are dark reddish-green.
