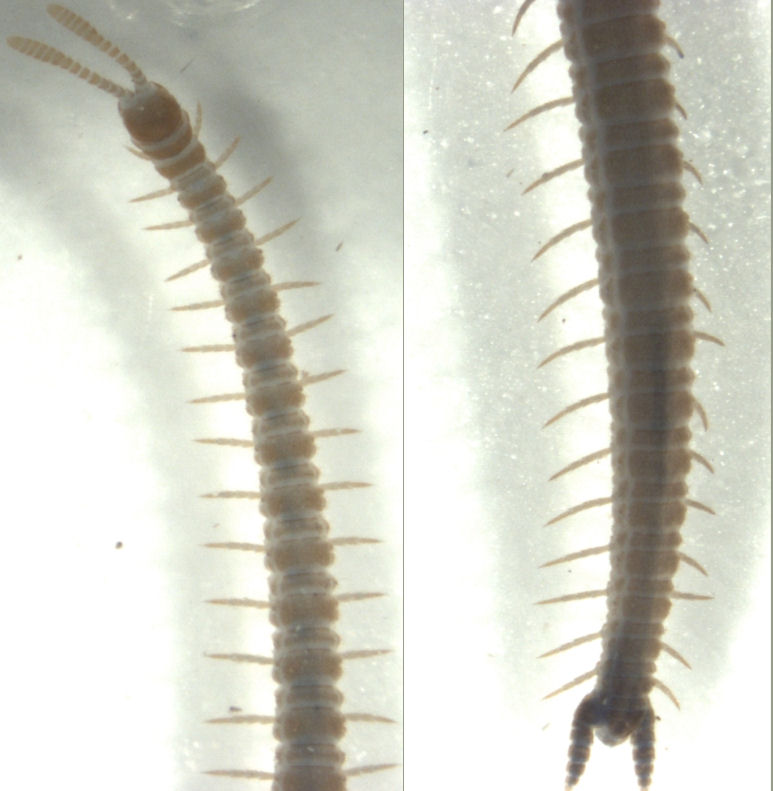
- Ballophilus hounselli

Scientific classification
- Kingdom: Animalia
- Phylum: Arthropoda
- Subphylum: Myriapoda
- Class: Chilopoda
- Order: Geophilomorpha
- Family: Ballophilidae
- Genus: Ballophilus; Cook, 1896

= Ballophilus =

Genus of centipedes

Ballophilus is the largest genus of soil centipedes in the clade formerly accepted as the family Ballophilidae. This genus includes 36 species. These centipedes are found in tropical and subtropical regions, mainly in Africa and southeast Asia.

== Taxonomy ==
This genus was first described in 1896 by the American biologist Orator F. Cook, who placed this genus in the family Ballophilidae, which he introduced to contain this new genus. In subsequent decades, however, some authorities rejected the taxonomic rank proposed by Cook, instead placing Ballophilus in a subfamily (Ballophilinae) within the family Schendylidae. Others placed this genus in Ballophilidae, which they accepted as a separate family, a rank that eventually gained broad support from authorities.

In 2014, however, a phylogenetic analysis of the order Geophilomorpha using both morphological and molecular data found representatives of the family Ballophilidae, including species of Ballophilus, nested among species of the family Schendylidae. To avoid paraphyly of the family Schendylidae with respect to Ballophilidae, authorities dismissed Ballophilidae as a separate family. Authorities now place the genera formerly contained in the family Ballophilidae, including Ballophilus, in the family Schendylidae instead, sometimes in the subfamily Ballophilinae. Nevertheless, some references still place Ballophilus in Ballophilidae, which they accept as a valid family.

== Description ==
Centipedes in this genus feature antennae that are conspicuously shaped like clubs. The middle part of the labrum is a thin membrane without teeth, but the side pieces feature teeth. The forcipular sternum lacks distinct chitin lines but may feature a faint thickening of the cuticle starting at the forcipular condyle. The sternites feature circumscribed fields of pores, and these fields are either nearly circular or transversally elliptical. The basal element of each of the ultimate legs (coxopleuron) usually features two pores. These pores connect to coxal organs with a simple structure (with each pore connecting to a single gland through a single duct that does not branch) rather than a composite structure (with multiple ducts from distinct glands converging to connect to each pore). At the distal end of each of the ultimate legs is a tubercle with a seta instead of a claw.

Species in this genus range from about 1 cm to about 7 cm in length and feature 37 to 91 pairs of legs. The Asian species Ballophilus pallidus measures only 11 mm in length and can have as few as 37 leg pairs (37 or 39 in males, 41 in females), the minimum number found in this genus. Both B. fijiensis and B. giganteus can have as many as 91 leg pairs, the maximum number found in this genus, but B. giganteus is also notable for its large size, reaching 75 mm in length.

== Phylogeny ==
This genus is probably closely related to the genera Ityphilus and Diplethmus. In 2014, a phylogenetic analysis of the order Geophilomorpha using both molecular data and morphology found a representative of the genus Ballophilus nested among species of Ityphilus in a phylogenetic tree of this order. This evidence suggests that some species of Ityphilus may be more closely related to some species of Ballophilus than to other species of Ityphilus and that Ityphilus may be paraphyletic with respect to Ballophilus.

The genera Ballophilus and Ityphilus share a distinctive set of traits. For example, the antennae in both genera are thicker toward the distal end, producing a distinctly club-like shape. Furthermore, as in some species of Ityphilus, the antennae in Ballophilus are bent in the middle. Moreover, in both genera, the middle of the labrum is a thin membrane without teeth, the sternites of leg-bearing segments feature rounded and well defined pore fields, and each of the ultimate legs features seven articles with two pores on the coxopleuron.

Species of Ballophilus can be distinguished from their close relatives in Ityphilus, however, based on other traits. For example, the forcipular sternite features chitin lines in Ityphilus, but these lines are entirely or virtually absent in Ballophilus. Furthermore, the posterior part of the clypeus in Ballophilus features smooth areas (plagulae) that are absent in Ityphilus, and the coxosternite of the second maxillae is divided down the middle by a longitudinal groove in Ballophilus but not in Ityphilus.

== Species ==
This genus includes the following species:

- Ballophilus alluaudi Ribaut, 1914
- Ballophilus australiae Chamberlin, 1920
- Ballophilus braunsi Silvestri, 1907
- Ballophilus clavicornis Cook, 1896
- Ballophilus comastes Crabill, 1971
- Ballophilus conservatus Chamberlin, 1944
- Ballophilus differens Chamberlin, 1951
- Ballophilus fijiensis Chamberlin, 1920
- Ballophilus filiformis Attems, 1953
- Ballophilus flavescens Attems, 1938
- Ballophilus foresti Demange, 1963
- Ballophilus giganteus Demange, 1963
- Ballophilus granulosus Attems, 1938
- Ballophilus hounselli Archey, 1936
- Ballophilus insperatus Lawrence, 1960
- Ballophilus kraepelini Attems, 1907
- Ballophilus latisternus Lawrence, 1960
- Ballophilus lawrencei Verhoeff, 1939
- Ballophilus liber Chamberlin, 1953
- Ballophilus maculosus (Porat, 1894)
- Ballophilus maldivensis Pocock, 1906
- Ballophilus mauritianus Verhoeff, 1939
- Ballophilus neocaledonicus Ribaut, 1923
- Ballophilus pallidus Attems, 1938
- Ballophilus paucipes Chamberlin, 1920
- Ballophilus pedadanus Chamberlin, 1944
- Ballophilus peruanus Verhoeff, 1951
- Ballophilus polypus Attems, 1907
- Ballophilus pygmaeus Attems, 1953
- Ballophilus ramirezi Pereira, Foddai & Minelli, 1997
- Ballophilus riveroi Chamberlin, 1950
- Ballophilus rouxi Ribaut, 1923
- Ballophilus sabesinus Chamberlin, 1944
- Ballophilus smaragdus Demange, 1963
- Ballophilus taenioformis Lawrence, 1960
- Ballophilus tercrux Würmli, 1972
