= Caritohallex =

Scientific classification
- Kingdom: Animalia
- Phylum: Arthropoda
- Subphylum: Myriapoda
- Class: Chilopoda
- Order: Geophilomorpha
- Family: Ballophilidae
- Genus: Caritohallex; Crabill, 1960
- Species: C. minyrrhopus

Binomial name
- Caritohallex minyrrhopus Crabill, 1960

Genus of centipedes

Caritohallex is a monotypic genus of centipede with only one species, Caritohallex minyrrhopus, found in Panama and the Lesser Antilles. This species has slender antennae, no coxal pores, and a single tarsal article on the ultimate legs. The original description of this species is based on a male holotype measuring about 10 mm in length with 39 pairs of legs and a female paratype measuring 8 mm in length with 43 leg pairs.
