= Afrotaenia =

Afrotaenia machadoi

Scientific classification
- Kingdom: Animalia
- Phylum: Arthropoda
- Subphylum: Myriapoda
- Class: Chilopoda
- Order: Geophilomorpha
- Family: Ballophilidae
- Genus: Afrotaenia
- Species: A. machadoi

Binomial name
- Afrotaenia machadoi Chamberlin, 1951

Genus of centipedes

Afrotaenia is a monotypic genus of centipedes with only one species, Afrotaenia machadoi, found in Angola. This species features trunk metasternites without patterned pore-fields, only scattered pores, and claws on the ultimate legs. The original description of this species is based on two rust-colored specimens, including a female measuring about 20 mm in length with 59 pairs of legs.
