= Ityphilus =

Scientific classification
- Kingdom: Animalia
- Phylum: Arthropoda
- Subphylum: Myriapoda
- Class: Chilopoda
- Order: Geophilomorpha
- Family: Ballophilidae
- Genus: Ityphilus; Cook, 1899

Type species
- Ityphilus lilacinus Cook, 1899

Synonyms
- Thalthybius Attems, 1900; Thalthybius (Prionothalthybius) Brölemann, 1909

Genus of centipedes

Ityphilus is a genus of soil centipedes in the clade once accepted as the family Ballophilidae, but now regarded as a possible subfamily (Ballophilinae) in the family Schendylidae. This genus includes 28 species. These centipedes are found mostly in tropical and subtropical parts of the Americas but also on islands in Seychelles, East Asia, and the Pacific Ocean.

== Taxonomy ==
This genus was first described in 1899 by the American myriapodologist Orator Fuller Cook in 1899. He placed this genus in the family Ballophilidae. In 2014, however, a phylogenetic analysis of the order Geophilomorpha using both morphological and molecular evidence found representatives of the family Ballophilidae nested among species of the family Schendylidae. To avoid paraphyly of the family Schendylidae with respect to Ballophilidae, authorities dismissed Ballophilidae as a separate family. Authorities now place this genus in the family Schendylidae instead. Nevertheless, some references continue to place this genus in Ballophilidae, which they accept as a valid family.

== Description ==
Centipedes in this genus feature antennae that are curved or bent in the middle and thicker at the distal end. The middle of the labrum is a thin membrane without teeth. The forcipular sternite features a pair of well marked but narrow sclerotized stripes (chitin lines). The anterior part of the trunk features a field of pores that is rounded and undivided on each sternite. Each of the ultimate legs features seven articles with two pores on the basal element (coxopleuron).

These centipedes range from about 1 cm to about 9 cm in length and have 37 to 113 pairs of legs. The miniature species Ityphilus grismadoi ranges from 7 to 9 mm in length and can have as few as 37 leg pairs, the minimum number recorded in the clade formerly known as Ballophilidae. The large species I. grandis can reach 93 mm in length and have as many as 113 leg pairs, the maximum number recorded in the clade formerly known as Ballophilidae.

== Phylogeny ==
This genus is probably closely related to the genera Ballophilus and Diplethmus. In 2014, a phylogenetic analysis of the order Geophilomorpha using both molecular data and morphology found a representative of the genus Ballophilus nested among species of Ityphilus in a phylogenetic tree of this order. This evidence suggests that some species of Ityphilus may be more closely related to some species of Ballophilus than to other species of Ityphilus and that Ityphilus may be paraphyletic with respect to Ballophilus.

The genera Ityphilus and Ballophilus share a distinctive set of traits. For example, the antennae in both genera are thicker toward the distal end, producing a distinctly club-like shape. Furthermore, as in some species of Ityphilus, the antennae in Ballophilus are bent in the middle. Moreover, in both genera, the middle of the labrum is a thin membrane without teeth, the sternites of leg-bearing segments feature rounded and well defined pore fields, and each of the ultimate legs features seven articles with two pores on the coxopleuron.

Species of Ityphilus can be distinguished from their relatives in Ballophilus, however, based on other traits. For example, the forcipular sternite features chitin lines in Ityphilus, but these lines are entirely or virtually absent in Ballophilus. Furthermore, the posterior part of the clypeus in Ballophilus features smooth areas (plagulae) that are absent in Ityphilus, and the coxosternite of the second maxillae is divided down the middle by a longitudinal groove in Ballophilus but not in Ityphilus.

== Species ==
This genus includes the following species:

- Ityphilus betschi Pereira, 2010
- Ityphilus bonatoi Pereira, 2013
- Ityphilus boteltobogensis (Wang, 1955)
- Ityphilus calinus Chamberlin, 1957
- Ityphilus cavernicolus (Matic, Negrea & Fundora Martínez, 1977)
- Ityphilus ceibanus Chamberlin, 1922
- Ityphilus cifuentesi Cupul-Magaña, 2014
- Ityphilus crabilli Pereira, Minelli & Barbieri, 1994
- Ityphilus demoraisi Pereira, Minelli & Barbieri, 1995
- Ityphilus donatellae Pereira, 2012
- Ityphilus geoffroyi Pereira, 2013
- Ityphilus grandis (Turk, 1955)
- Ityphilus grismadoi Pereira, 2017
- Ityphilus guianensis Chamberlin, 1921
- Ityphilus idanus Crabill, 1960
- Ityphilus krausi Pereira & Minelli, 1996
- Ityphilus lilacinus Cook, 1899
- Ityphilus mauriesi Demange & Pereira, 1985
- Ityphilus melanostigma (Attems, 1900)
- Ityphilus microcephalus (Brölemann, 1909)
- Ityphilus nemoides Chamberlin, 1943
- Ityphilus palidus (Matic, Negrea & Fundora Martínez, 1977)
- Ityphilus perrieri (Brölemann, 1909)
- Ityphilus polypus (Matic, Negrea & Fundora Martínez, 1977)
- Ityphilus saucius Pereira, Foddai & Minelli, 2000
- Ityphilus savannus Chamberlin, 1943
- Ityphilus sensibilis Pereira, Foddai & Minelli, 2000
- Ityphilus tenuicollis (Takakuwa, 1934)
