= Constantine Dawydoff =

Russian zoologist and embryologist

Konstantin Nikolayevich Davydov
- Константин Николаевич Давыдов
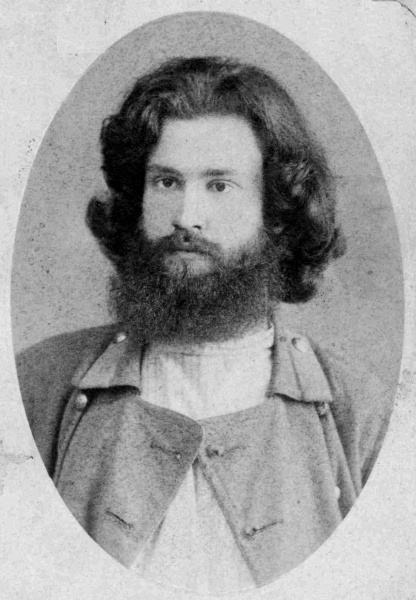
- Born: Константин Николаевич Давыдов; December 18, 1877; Zubtsov, Tver Oblast, Russian Empire
- Died: June 21, 1960 (aged 82); Sceaux, France
- Resting place: Sainte-Geneviève-des-Bois; 48°37'52.4"N 2°20'36.7"E
- Spouse: Agnia Yuryevna Davydov

Constantine Dawydoff (December 18, 1877 - June 21, 1960) was a French zoologist and embryologist who is known for his work on a variety of invertebrates, arthropods, and comparative embryology.

Constantine (Nicknamed Kostya) was born in the Russian Empire in 1877 to parents Nikolai Konstantinovich Davydov and Lidia Stefanovna Lyubomirova. As a child, he spent his time hunting and birdwatching with his father, leading to him developing an interest in ornithology. Dawydoff spent his teenage years studying the birds of Tver, leading him to study in the natural sciences after graduating high school.

Dawydoff started studying zoology in 1896 at Saint Petersburg Imperial University, specializing in the Zootomy Room and working with the academic Alexander O. Kovalevsky. During his time in university, he took two trips to Syria, the Dead Sea, Palestine and Arabia in 1897 and 1898 respectively, nearly dying of malaria in the latter trip. In the winter of 1899, Dawydoff was expelled and imprisoned for support of a student protest, but was shortly freed and reinstated by the intercession of his professor Vladimir T. Shevyakov. The following year, Dawydoff submitted a study on echinoderm regeneration to a university student competition, winning 1st place. Dawydoff graduated with a first degree diploma in 1901.

In 1902, Dawydoff was set to travel to Java with Kovalevsky, but his death in November of 1901 led him to lead the 10-month expedition by himself. Dawydoff worked in Beitenzorg Botanical Garden, as well as other islands throughout Indonesia and Singapore. During his time there, he studied marine life including plankton, learned to speak Malay, and lived in the tropical forests.

Following his trip, Dawydoff began to give lectures. He continued to travel throughout his studies, and obtained his Master's degree in 1909. From 1904 to 1913, he went on various expeditions to the Red Sea, Spain, Crimea, Turkey, Egypt, the Caucasus, Norway and Lapland.

In 1910, Constantine became a professor at Saint Petersburg Imperial University, teaching a course on invertebrate embryology. Some of his students included zoologist Vladimir N. Beklemishev and embryologist Pavel G. Svetlov. In 1914, he published a monograph on comparative embryology called "Курс эмбриологии беспозвоночных" (Course of Invertebrate Embryology). The next year, he completed his doctoral dissertation.

Shortly after the creation of Perm State University, Dawydoff

Perm, and Petrograd. In response to the Russian Civil War, he fled to France in 1922 and worked as a zoologist in France and Mainland Southeast Asia for several decades and was elected a corresponding member for the Academy of Sciences in Paris in 1949.

Constantine's extensive work on marine invertebrates and embryology has led to him being the namesake of at least five species: Scolopendra dawydoffi, Strophidon dawydoffi, Anopsobius dawydoffi, Hormiops davidovi and Discosoma dawydoffi.

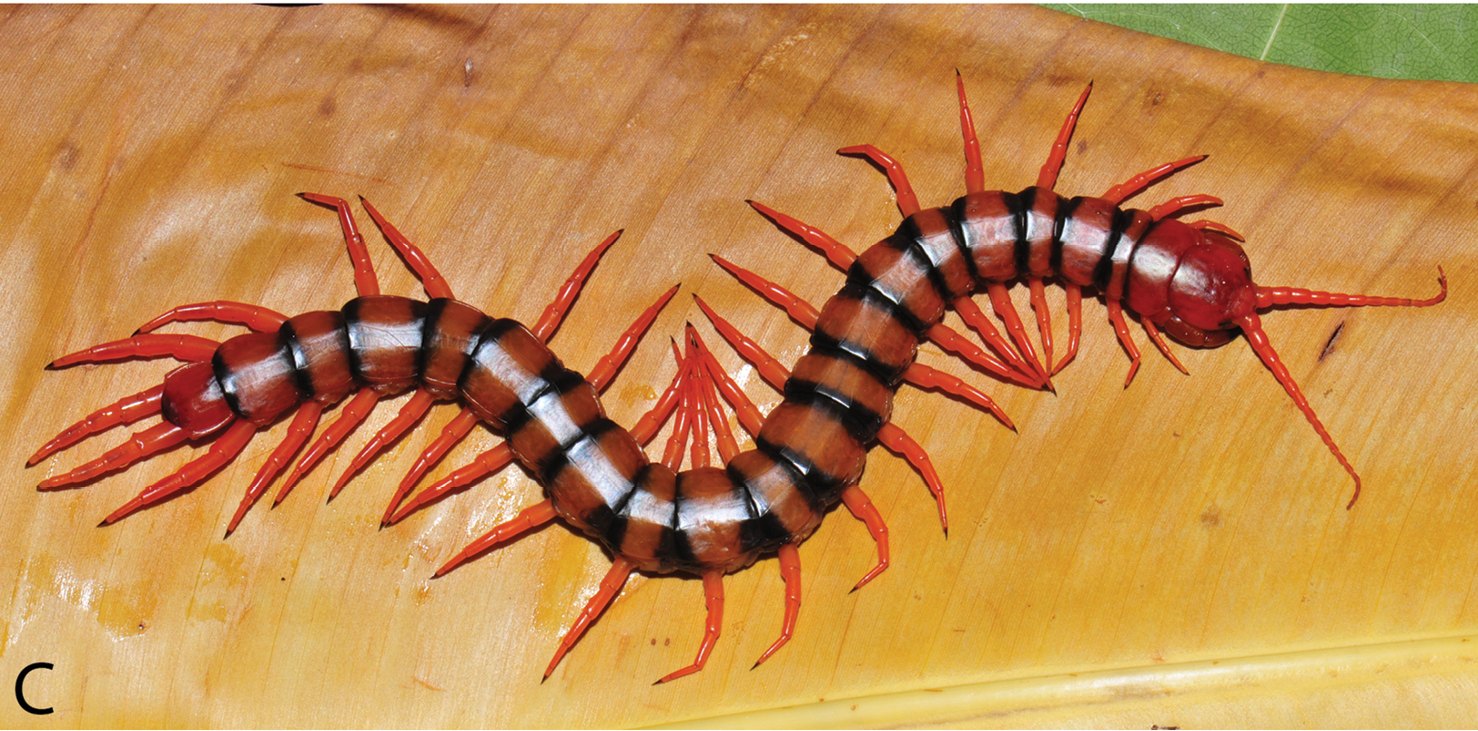
Scolopendra dawydoffi, a species of centipede named after C. Dawydoff.
