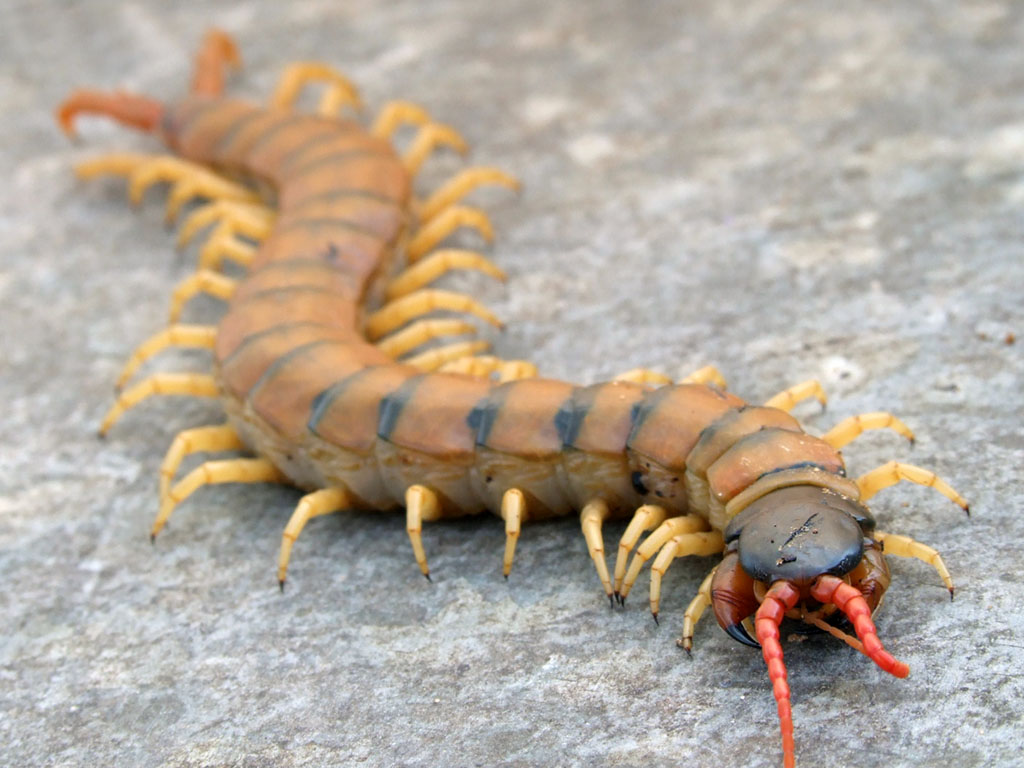

Scientific classification
- Kingdom: Animalia
- Phylum: Arthropoda
- Subphylum: Myriapoda
- Class: Chilopoda
- Order: Scolopendromorpha
- Family: Scolopendridae
- Genus: Scolopendra
- Species: S. cingulata

Binomial name
- Scolopendra cingulata Latreille, 1829

Synonyms
- Scolopendra hispanica (Newport, 1845); Scolopendra nigrifrons (Koch, 1847); Scolopendra thracia (Verhoeff, 1928); Scolopendra hispanica; Scolopendra nigrifrons; Scolopendra thracia

= Scolopendra cingulata =

Species of centipede

Scolopendra cingulata, also known as Megarian banded centipede, and the Mediterranean banded centipede, is a species of centipede, and "the most common scolopendromorph species in the Mediterranean area".

== Description ==
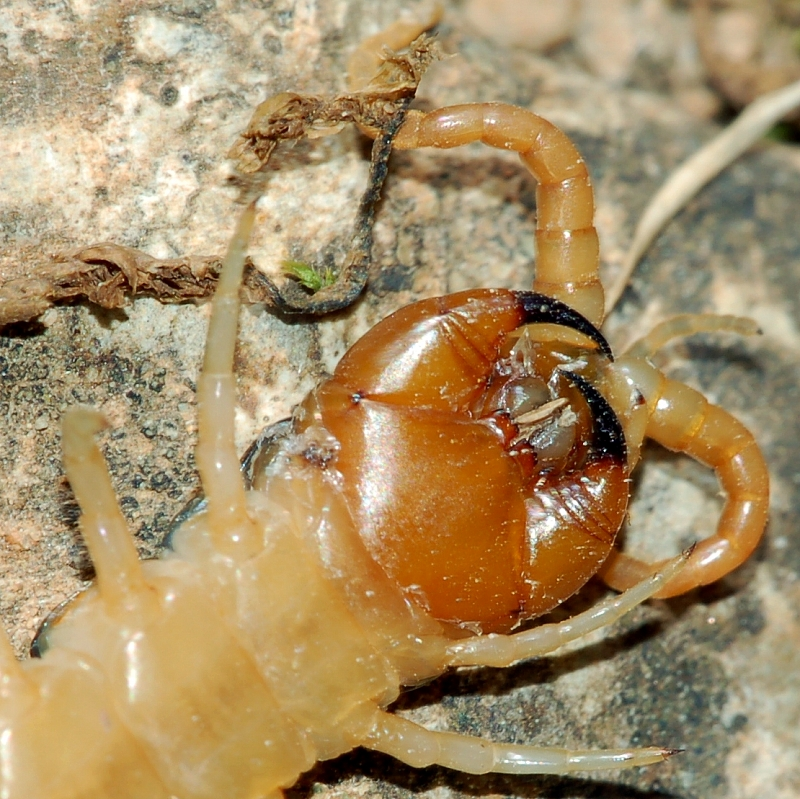
Underside of head showing forcipules

The species has alternating bands of black and yellow-gold. At approximately 15–18 centimetres (5.9–7.1 in), Scolopendra cingulata is one of the smallest species in the family Scolopendridae.

Its venom is also not as toxic as that of other scolopendrid centipedes.

== Distribution ==
Widely distributed, this species can be found throughout southern Europe, including Portugal and around the Mediterranean Sea, in such countries as Spain, France, Italy, Albania, Serbia, Croatia, Israel, and Greece, around the Black Sea in South Romania, Bulgaria, Ukraine, as well as parts of North Africa. It also has small relict populations in Austria and Hungary.

== Habitat ==
Scolopendra cingulata is a burrowing animal, preferring dark, damp environments such as beneath logs and in leaf litter.

== Diet ==
Scolopendra cingulata is an opportunistic carnivore. It will attack and consume almost any animal that is not larger than itself; this includes insects and small lizards.
