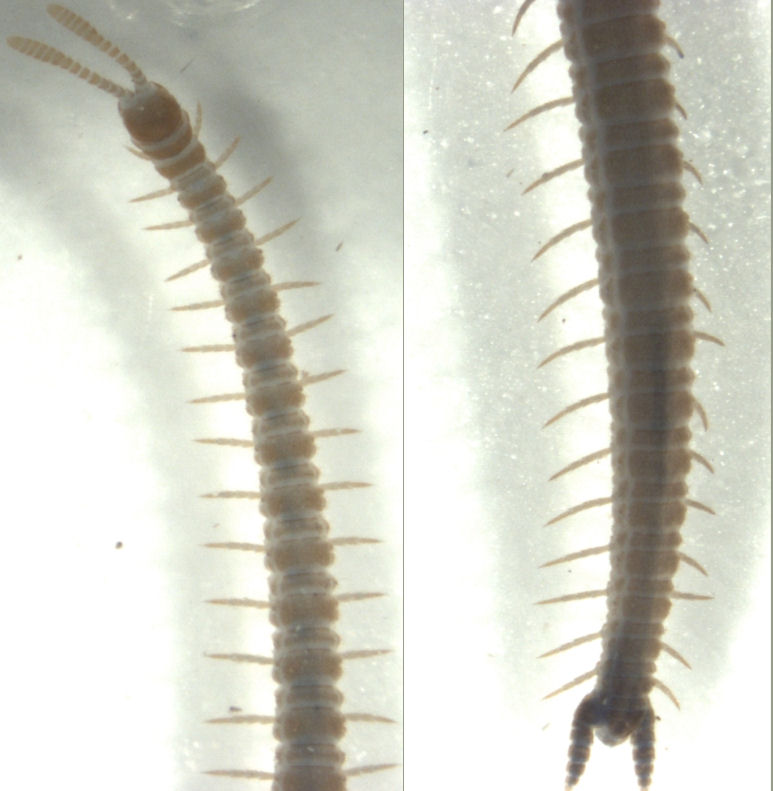
- Ballophilus hounselli

Scientific classification
- Kingdom: Animalia
- Phylum: Arthropoda
- Subphylum: Myriapoda
- Class: Chilopoda
- Order: Geophilomorpha
- Family: Ballophilidae

= Ballophilidae =

Family of centipedes

Ballophilidae is a monophyletic group of centipedes belonging to the order Geophilomorpha and superfamily Himantarioidea. Authorities now dismiss Ballophilidae as a family and consider this clade to be a possible subfamily (Ballophilinae) within the family Schendylidae. This clade includes about 80 species in 12 genera. Centipedes in this clade are found in most tropical regions.

== Taxonomy ==
The family Ballophilidae was introduced in 1896 by the American biologist Orator F. Cook. He proposed this family of centipedes to contain the new genus Ballophilus, which he simultaneously described. In subsequent decades, some authorities rejected the taxonomic rank proposed by Cook, instead regarding his taxon as a subfamily (Ballophilinae) within the family Shendylidae. Others accepted Ballophilidae as a separate family, a rank that eventually gained broad support from authorities.

In 2014, however, a phylogenetic analysis of the order Geophilomorpha using both morphological and molecular data found representatives of the family Ballophilidae nested among species of the family Schendylidae. To avoid paraphyly of the family Schendylidae with respect to Ballophilidae, authorities dismissed Ballophilidae as a separate family. Authorities now place the genera formerly contained in the family Ballophilidae in the family Schendylidae instead,. sometimes in the subfamily Ballophilinae. Nevertheless, some references still accept Ballophilidae as a valid family.

== Description ==
Centipedes in this clade differ from others in the family Schendylidae by having bodies tapered toward the anterior tip, short heads, slender forcipules that are well apart, and an undivided lamina for the female gonopods. The number of legs in this clade varies within as well as among species and ranges from 37 to 113 pairs of legs. Three species in this clade can have as few as 37 leg pairs, Ityphilus grismadoi, Ballophilus pallidus, and Leucolinum trinidadense, and one species, Ityphilus grandis, can have as many as 113 pairs. Species in this clade tend to have more leg-bearing segments and greater intraspecific variability in this number than generally found in the family Schendylidae. Some species in this clade are notable for their small sizes, including I. grismadoi (reaching only 9 mm in length), L. trinadadense (9 mm), Caritohallex minyrrhopus (10 mm), B. pallidus (11 mm), and Taeniolinum panamicum (11 mm).

== Genera ==
This clade includes the following genera:

- Afrotaenia Chamberlin, 1951
- Ballophilus Cook, 1896
- Caritohallex Crabill, 1960
- Cerethmus Chamberlin, 1941
- Clavophilus Chamberlin, 1950
- Diplethmus Cook, 1899
- Ityphilus Cook, 1899
- Koinethmus Chamberlin, 1958
- Leucolinum Chamberlin, 1945
- Taeniolinum Pocock, 1893
- Tanophilus Chamberlin, 1921
- Zygethmus Chamberlin, 1957
