= Opossum Lady =

American YouTuber

The "Opossum Lady", "Possum Lady", or pseudonymously Georgette Spelvin, is an American YouTuber from Southern California known for her videos in which she handles seemingly tame opossums and squirrels. She has created videos on the YouTube channel MEpearlA since 2010. Though most videos center on the opossums she lives with, they vary widely, with some being informational, describing procedures on how to safely handle large rodents, and others being more abstract or theatrical. Spelvin describes herself as the physical host to a psychic, dead squirrel named Pearl de Wisdom, or Pearl for short. The squirrel has also been named as Pearl de Sagesse de Sabaduria. The name Georgette Spelvin has historically been used as a pseudonym in the theater of the United States.

Many of Spelvin's videos feature an opossum named Porgus. Her first video, "Proper Opossum massage", has been described as her "most viral". She does not advise others to attempt bringing wild opossums or squirrels into their home, recommending those who find injured or endangered animals to contact wildlife rescue services. Spelvin has described herself as a licensed wildlife rehabilitator, as well as a former "performance artist, professional masseuse, veterinary technician, dual diagnosis counselor on the psychiatric unit of a major metropolitan hospital, and the resident storyteller of an International Cultural Center". She has espoused a belief system in which a person can take all of their belongings into the afterlife.

She published the book Pearls of Wisdom: Advice from a Dead Squirrel Who Knows Everything through Apollo Publishers in 2022. It was reviewed in Publishers Weekly, where it was described as generally "irreverent and bemusing", though one chapter listing opossum names was noted as being "monotonous".

== Bibliography ==
- Pearl, ME; Spelvin, Georgette (April 5, 2022). Pearls of Wisdom: Advice from a Dead Squirrel Who Knows Everything. Apollo Publishers. ISBN 978-1-954641-02-0.
