= George Spelvin =

Traditional pseudonym used in programs in American theater

George Spelvin, Georgette Spelvin, and Georgina Spelvin are traditional pseudonyms used in programs in American theater.

"Georgina Spelvin" has fallen out of general use since it was adopted as a screen name by pornographic actress Shelley Graham, who was credited by that name in The Devil in Miss Jones (1973) and her subsequent films.

== History ==
According to a 1910 New York Sun article, actor-manager William Gillette created the pseudonym for an actor doubling in a second role in his 1908 play Ticey (aka That Little Affair of Boyd's). The actor was afraid that his reputation would be damaged if his name appeared in the cast list for a bit part. Gillette apparently made up the name George Spelvin on the spot. However, the Encyclopedia Britannica notes without citation that the name is said to have first appeared on a cast list in 1886 in Karl the Peddler, a play by Charles A. Gardiner, and that it was used by a cast member of Winchell Smith's Brewster's Millions in 1906. This latter usage is confirmed by contemporaneous newspaper cast lists for Brewster's Millions. According to a 1916 New York Times article, Winchell Smith insisted on having the pseudonym used in Brewster's Millions and later used it in other plays including Via Wireless.

== Reasons for use ==
The reasons for the use of an alternate name vary. Actors who do not want to be credited, or whose names would otherwise appear twice because they are playing more than one role in a production, may adopt a pseudonym. Actors who are members of the trade unions (such as the Actors' Equity Association), but are working under a non-union contract for a given production, may use pseudonyms to avoid fines or other penalties by their union.

In some plays, this name has appeared in cast lists as the name of an actor (or actress) portraying a character who is mentioned in the dialogue but never turns up onstage: with the role credited to "George Spelvin", the audience is not forewarned that the character never makes an entrance. The 1927 musical play Strike Up the Band by George S. Kaufman and George and Ira Gershwin features a character named George Spelvin. The name can also be used when one actor is playing what appear to be two characters, but is later revealed as being one person with two names or identities. Because of the pseudonym, the audience is not clued-in that the two seemingly separate characters are meant to be the same person. This is especially useful in murder mysteries.

The name may also be used for a character who never delivers a line, and thus any member of the stage crew might be filling in the role. For example, a person makes a delivery to a character onstage, the doorbell rings, the delivery is made, and the delivery carrier disappears, with no words spoken.

== Examples ==
The 1948–49 seasons of the old time radio series The New Adventures of Sherlock Holmes saw lead actor Wendell Holmes (who was playing Dr. Watson) credited as George Spelvin. This was supposedly done to avoid confusion between "Spelvin's" actual surname and the surname of the show's titular protagonist.

In Players de Noc's production of The Full Monty, about a group of men who try their luck as male strippers, a member of the production's orchestra, not wanting members of his church to find he was involved with such a risqué play, had his name credited as George Spelvin.

American YouTuber Pearl de Wisdom sometimes goes by the name Georgette Spelvin.

== Contrary examples ==
The name has also been used as a character name on several occasions. The one-act play The Actor's Nightmare by Christopher Durang features a main character named George Spelvin, and the January 27, 1942, episode of Fibber McGee and Molly ("The Blizzard") features a visit by a stranger calling himself George Spelvin (played by Frank Nelson). The name was used in the I Love Lucy episode "Don Juan is Shelved", in The Munsters episode "The Sleeping Cutie" as the real name of an actor, in the Mama's Family episode "Fangs A Lot, Mama" as the author of a book called A Nun's Life, and as the name of a character villain voiced by Peter Serafinowicz in the "Tragical History" episode of Archer.

The columnist Westbrook Pegler used this name in his writings; one of his books of collected columns is titled George Spelvin, American.

== Related pseudonyms ==
- Alan Smithee
- Walter Plinge
- David Agnew
