= Wildlife rehabilitation =

Care and subsequent release of wild animals

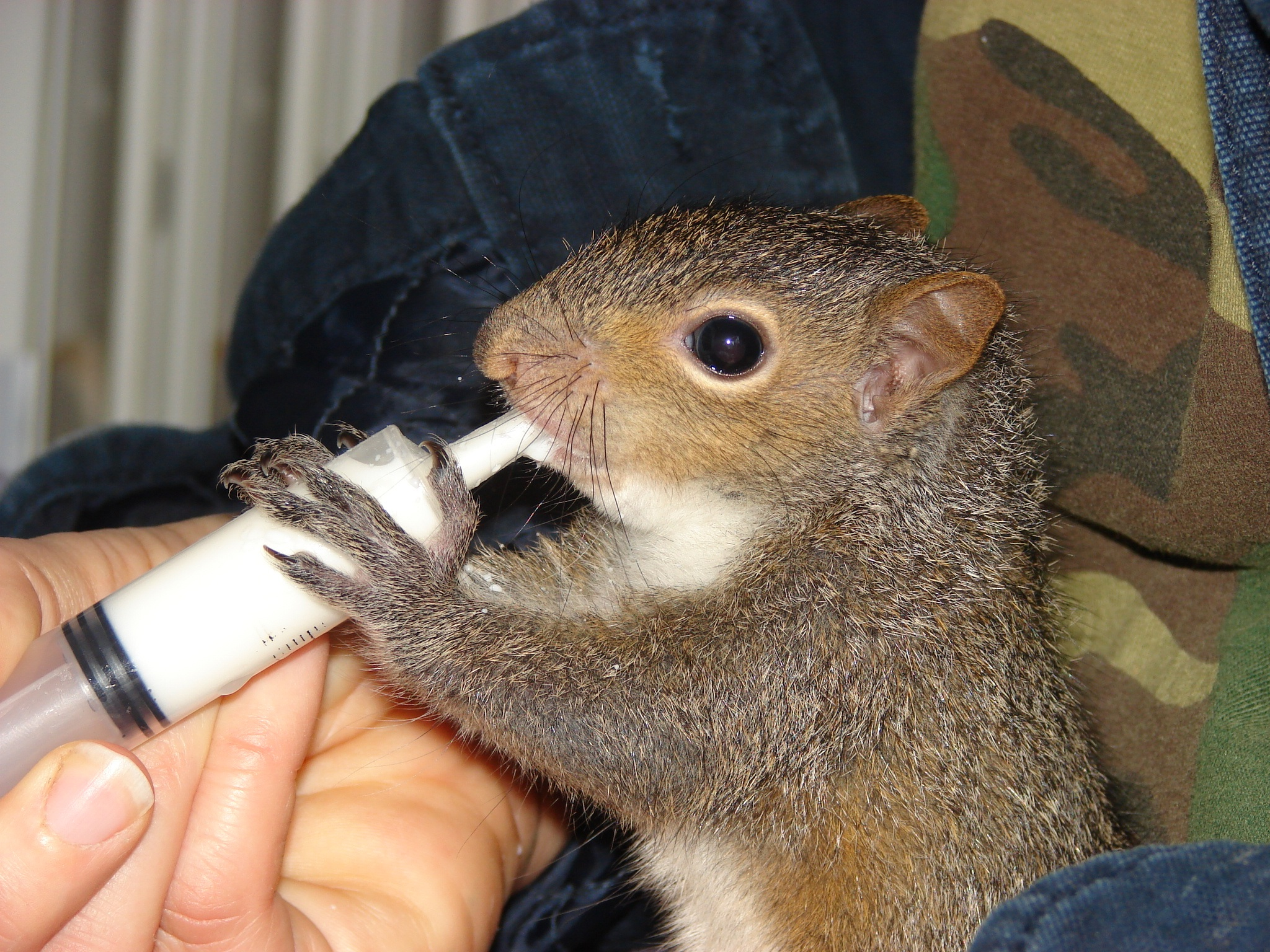
A rescued baby eastern gray squirrel being fed using a syringe

Wildlife rehabilitation is the process of caring for injured, sick, orphaned, or displaced wild animals with the goal of releasing them back into their natural habitat. It involves medical treatment, temporary housing, and specialized care for a variety of species, from birds and mammals to reptiles and amphibians. Wildlife rehabilitation combines veterinary science, wildlife conservation, and animal welfare to ensure that animals have the best chance for recovery and survival after facing challenges such as injury, disease, or human interference.

In addition to caring for animals, wildlife rehabilitators often work to educate the public about conservation, habitat protection, and how to coexist with wildlife. They play an essential role in addressing the effects of human activities on wild animal populations, including habitat destruction, pollution, and vehicle collisions.

== General ==
Rehabilitation facilities often admit hundreds to thousands of animals annually, with the causes for admission varying depending on the taxonomic group. Primarily birds and mammals are most commonly brought into rehabilitation facilities followed by reptiles then amphibians. Many rehabilitation centers are tied in public outreach programs in an attempt to reduce the threats to wildlife, particularly through human-wildlife conflicts.

While traditional human-wildlife interactions in the forms of hunting and trapping have declined over time, there has been an increase in the presence and use of wildlife rehabilitation centers, showing the transition in how the public is engaging with local wildlife.

== Process ==
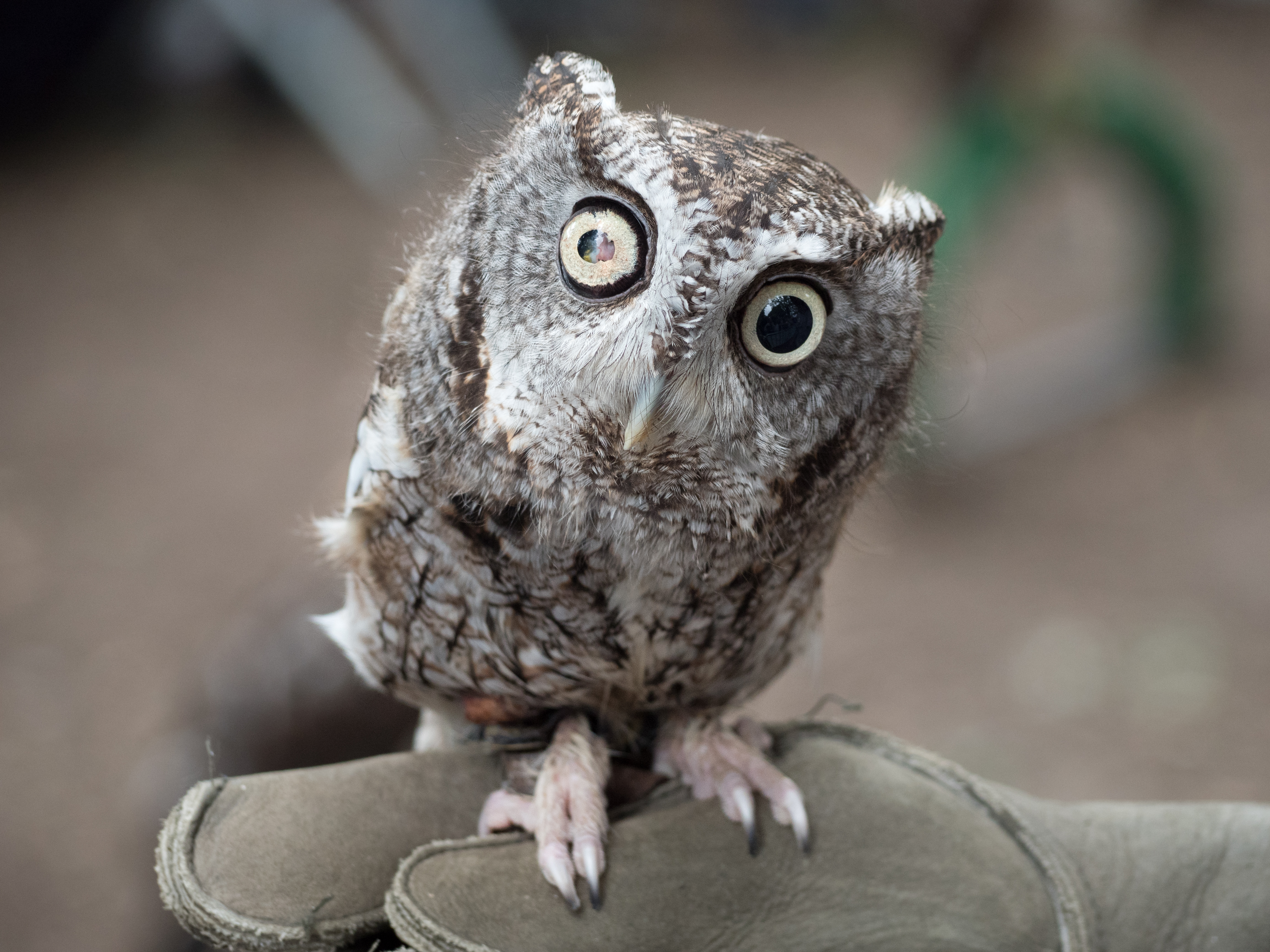
Eastern screech owl with handler, rescued after an eye injury

Wildlife rehabilitation requires specialized knowledge and training in wildlife biology, veterinary medicine, and animal care. Work performed by wildlife rehabilitators has a focus on the individual level and adequately distributes resources to help the most individuals. Practitioners are often motivated by compassion and beliefs in the importance of welfare and environmental protection, similar to conservation scientist's values.

The process typically follows these steps:

Rescue:

Rehabilitation begins when an animal is found and reported to a wildlife rehabilitator or seized from the illegal wildlife trade or a poacher. If one finds wildlife in need of rescue, it can be dangerous or even illegal to interact with the animal yourself; be sure to contact a licensed rehabilitator before taking action. Often, unsupervised individuals will perform procedures that would require the knowledge and skills of a veterinarian without seeking them out first, this often results in difficulties in the recovery process.

The facility relies on the public to bring the wildlife in to be treated, this leads to the majority of animals being admitted being those that untrained individuals are willing to handle. The most common reason for admission is orphaned/abandoned animals, but oftentimes they are not actually orphaned, therefore educating the public in the determining factors for if a baby is actually orphaned. There is a big change in the number and variability of species being admitted based on the seasons. This has a big part to do with baby season for animals, as it is often juvenile animals that are injured and admitted into the rehabilitation centers.

Assessment and Treatment:

Wildlife rehabilitators are not veterinarians but they are permitted to provide treatment for injured animals under the guidance and surveilance of a licensed veterinarian. Regardless, they still require the same amount of training as other medial technical professions. Some animals who suffer from severe injuries or illnesses that leave them beyond saving have to be euthanized. The best initial treatment recommended is fluid therapy, which involves stabilizing the animal by leaving them in a warm, quiet, dark enclosure for destressing. Other important treatment factor to consider is the Refeeding Syndrome which could impose severe damage to the animals' physiology if they are not treated with fluids and warmth before being fed solid food.

Rehabilitators practice triage, which is a series of guidelines and process to assess the urgency of an animal's injury and evaluate which specific conditions warrant more attention. In wildlife rehabilitation most of the essential framework of the triage typically used in the medical world, is preserved, however it is slightly adjusted in light of rehabilitation potential and eventual release as well as the availability of training facilities and other resources. To prevent any complications and further damage, triage decisions should also be made within 48 hours of admission.

Bio-containment risks present a great threat and make veterinary practices impractical and ineffective for long-term care. Furthermore, animals must undergo different types of assessments prior to being released, to ensure full recovery. For birds specifically, flight training, which mimics its natural wildlife ecosystems often uses large flight cages for bats and falconry-style training for raptors.

Recording Information:

Each individual animal admitted is given a unique record no matter if they came in with a group of other individuals, their life stage and even if they arrive at the center dead. After arrival a physical exam is performed to find the full extent of the injuries, these exams can be performed by veterinarians or rehabilitation center staff members. When an animal is admitted specific variables are recorded, these variables include scientific species name, age, sex (if applicable), exact location found and the reason they were admitted. The reason for admittance often does not match the actual reason the animal is in distress and in need of assistance. One often example of this is when people bring in 'orphaned' animals, particularly birds, with no visible injuries, but when admitted are found to be cat or dog attack victims based on internal or hidden injuries.

Often in records the individuals brought in are separated into general taxonomic groups, which are often birds (columbiformes, raptors, passerines, waterfowl, etc.), mammals (large mammals, small herbivores and small carnivores), rabies vector species (bats, raccoons and striped skunk), reptiles (turtles, snakes, and lizards) and amphibians (frogs and salamanders), and unknown.

Individual animals are then given a category of injury based on the extensiveness of the damage after being analyzed after admission. Typically there are 5 categories, 1 meaning no apparent injury to 5 meaning near death, blind or having a fractured pelvis with. In some cases there is a sixth category that is specifically for ocular injuries to owls. These categories are important in the analysis of the effect of injury severity on particular species and their likelihood for survival. There is also a scale for traumatic injuries rating 1 to 5, 1 being concussion or head trauma, 2 being fracture, 3 being undetermined, 4 being no visible trauma and 5 being other. If an animal is admitted with multiple injuries listed, it is officially listed with the primary reason for admittance, though if a disease is listed along with an injury both are recorded. Rabies is one of the many diseases that is amongst the most public health concern, this makes animals that are presenting the symptoms of the disease less likely to be approached and brought into the rehabilitation centers. This also leads to a lack of information on rabies vector species and how they are affected in rehabilitation efforts.

The animals that come in with injuries like complex fractures and deep wounds penetrating the tissue have been found to have poor release rates as well as longer periods held in care prior to release or death in care. This finding has brought the question of welfare into consideration, seeing as poor triage is equated to poor welfare. Poor welfare is associated with high stress to the animal from increased interaction, this stress is a major prevention factor in the recovery process.

There are also categories for the final disposition of the animal split into 4 groups, 1 for died under care, prior to care or euthanized 2 for released, 3 for non-releasable and placed under permanent care of licensed individual or institution, and 4 for unknown either still under care or just completely unknown.

Rehabilitation:

Once stabilized, the animal is placed in an appropriate setting where it can recover. This may include an aviary, enclosure, or pool, depending on the species. Animals undergo three stages of housing depending on the type of injury and/or illness. Restricted caging permits the animal to undergo limited activities and mobilities, focusing on observation, rest and treatment. The recovery phase of housing provides more leniency to the limitation while the unlimited or conditioning phase mandates for a rehabilitation space that will allow the wildlife to regain their strength, mobility, and survival skills.

The animals' life-history strategies can affect their ability to combat increases in mortality rates in the population. R-selected species that have rapid maturity, high fecundity, and short generation times are more likely to be able to recover from declines in population. Unlike K-selected species with slow growth, low fecundity, and long generation times which are much more vulnerable to increased declines following increases in adult mortality.

Rehabilitation centers generally consider the successful release of an individual to be a success, but higher up success is considered to be a proper release and integration back into the wild with a similar survival rate to their wild counterparts. There are also different requirements before an individual can be released into the wild, one being that if an animal had an amputated limb it is not allowed to be released into the wild as they are not believed to be the most successful when trying to integrate into their original environment. If it is believed that the individual being rehabilitated is not going to survive or is going to live but only in an unfit for life in the wild then it is expected that it will be euthanized to prevent further suffering. There is an exception if it is possible for the individual to live in captivity with a good quality of life.

Release:

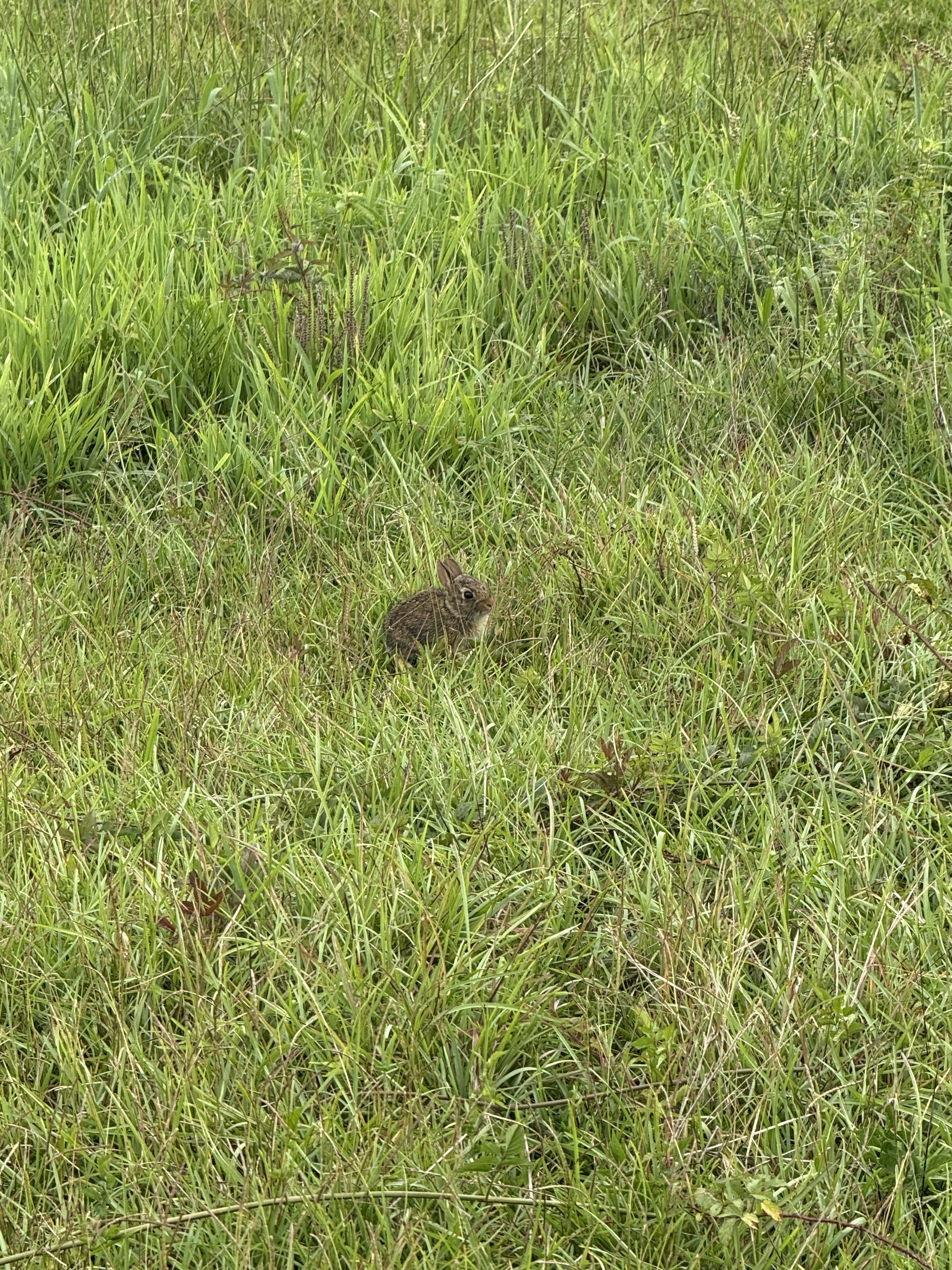
Eastern Cottontail being released into the wild after rehabilitation.

When an animal is fully recovered, rehabilitators aim to release it into a suitable habitat close to where it was originally found. The release site is carefully chosen to ensure the animal can thrive in its environment. Rehabilitation differs from other forms of translocations used to release animals because individuals are released at their capture site as long as it is a safe area for them to return to instead of an unfamiliar environment. Releasing rehabilitated individuals back into their original population is unlikely to affects in large numbers, but in small and threatened populations it can mean the difference between extinction and survival of the entire population.

There is also the consideration of how an animal is released, as that has been found to affect the survivability of the species in the wild. There is also the consideration that particular species need more care and attention before they can be released, particularly for juveniles.

It can be quite hard to determine if the animals being released are surviving, but one effective way to see if they are is to track them via radiotracking or other conservation tracking efforts. It has been found that translocations and reintroductions of wild animals are more successful than captive-bred individuals. Rehabilitated individuals have a good chance of surviving when returned to the wild after treatment.

In order to determine that a wildlife is ready for release post-rehabilitation, it must be assessed on its physical fitness, independence and recovery from injury. Specifically, rehabilitators focus on the development of its wild behaviors and ability to participate in social grouping. The two primary methods used for freeing animals are classified as soft and hard release. Soft release involves supplementing the animal with a protective enclosure and recognizable food at the site whereas hard release neglects the transition period and dives directly into releasing the rehabilitated wildlife into the wild. The outcome of soft and hard release also varies species-by-species. The IUCN defines the success in release by a population that can sustain itself with minimal long-term management, however there are controversies around the necessity of constant human intervention in the survival of certain species.

Other Outcomes:

In order to be released, an animals must be physically and mentally well and be able to survive on its own. Animals that cannot be rehabilitated are usually euthanized humanely, although animals are occasionally placed at facilities appropriately licensed for educational exhibit such as a zoo or nature center or be kept by the rehabilitator (under separate permit) as a surrogate parent for orphaned or injured young wildlife.

Rehabilitators main goal is to help injured or sick animals recover. However, captivity for long periods of time and human interaction can cause additional stress to the animals. Rehabiliators must consider the animals welfare, potential for recovery, and the ability to survive independently. These decisions ultimately lead to release, permanent captivity, or euthanasia.

Preventing imprinting and habituation is important in the rehabilitation process. Imprinting occurs when a young animal, specifically young birds, begin to see the rehabilitator as their primary caregiver. It is possible to reverse this process in most animals, but it is permanent with birds. Rehabilitators have to take caution when caring for young animals in order to avoid this. It is critical to establish maintain boundaries between the rehabilitator and the animal. This includes wearing a mask and gloves around animals or even covering an animal's cage with a towel to prevent contact with humans.

== Background ==
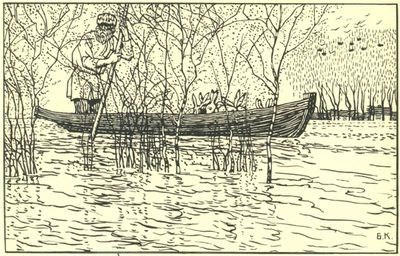
Old hunter Mazay rescuing stranded hares during snow melt floods, portrayed in a 19th-century poem by Nikolay Nekrasov, remains a favorite character with Russia's children.

=== Early practices ===
Throughout history, various cultures have exhibited compassion toward injured animals, but wildlife rehabilitation as a specific practice began to emerge in the 20th century. In the early 1900s, conservationists and animal welfare advocates started to recognize the value of rescuing and rehabilitating injured wildlife. At this time, it was common for private individuals or veterinarians to care for wild animals in their homes with little formal training or regulatory oversight.

The 1952 Nobel Peace Prize laureate, Albert Schweitzer, can be considered the founder of modern wildlife rehabilitation. Through his hospital in Lambarene, French Equatorial Africa (now Gabon), Schweitzer offered refuge and aid not only to humans but also many injured animals. Although details on the extent of the hospital's credentials and operations are not well-known, Schweitzer's ethic of reverence for life still guides the practice of wildlife rehabilitation today.

=== Rise of wildlife conservation (mid-20th century) ===
Wildlife rehabilitation became more organized during the mid-20th century, coinciding with growing global awareness of environmental issues and the need to protect biodiversity. After World War II, wildlife conservation became a major concern in the United States and other parts of the world, as habitats were destroyed by development, pollution, and industrial activities. Along with conservation efforts, the first wildlife rehabilitation centers began to emerge, focusing on treating injured or orphaned animals with the aim of releasing them back into the wild.

The U.S. saw the rise of the Migratory Bird Treaty Act of 1918, which played an important role in wildlife protection. It prohibited the capture, killing, or selling of migratory birds and laid the groundwork for more structured wildlife care, specifically for bird species. Throughout the 1960s and 1970s, landmark conservation laws like the Endangered Species Act of 1973 and the Clean Water Act helped further establish a legal framework that encouraged wildlife preservation and, by extension, rehabilitation efforts.

The Lindsay Wildlife Experience, originally the Lindsay Wildlife Museum and Wildlife Hospital in Walnut Creek, California was the first wildlife hospital in the United States, opening in 1970.

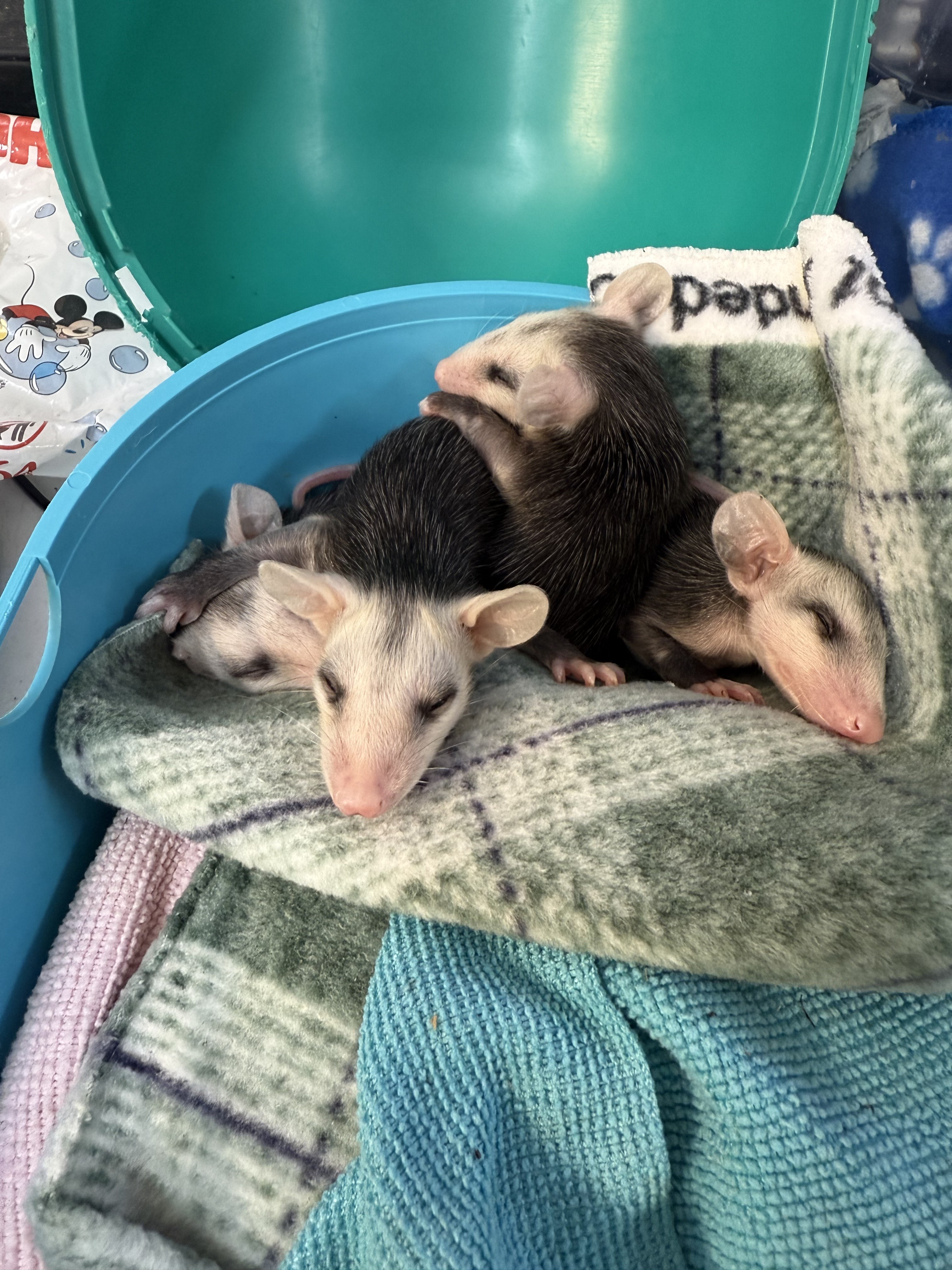
Baby Virginia Opossums being rehabilitated after their mom was attacked and killed by a dog

=== Professionalization of wildlife rehabilitation (late 20th century) ===
The field of wildlife rehabilitation began to professionalize in the 1980s and 1990s as more people became involved, and the need for standardized care practices became apparent. Organizations like the International Wildlife Rehabilitation Council (IWRC), founded in 1972, and the National Wildlife Rehabilitators Association (NWRA), founded in 1982, were instrumental in developing training programs, certifications, and best practices. These organizations provided education, support, and networking for wildlife rehabilitators, helping to establish wildlife rehabilitation as a recognized profession. In 1984, these two organizations collaborated to publish the Minimum Standards for Wildlife Rehabilitation.

As scientific understanding of wildlife behavior and veterinary medicine advanced, rehabilitators adopted more sophisticated techniques for treating injured animals. This era also saw the development of wildlife-specific veterinary practices and the establishment of wildlife rehabilitation as a key part of conservation programs.

=== Current trends and challenges ===
Today, wildlife rehabilitation is a global practice, with centers and trained rehabilitators operating in many countries. Rehabilitators work closely with veterinarians, government agencies, and conservationists to care for animals and address the impact of human activities on wildlife populations. Rehabilitation efforts have expanded to include not only individual animal care but also broader roles in conservation, public education, and wildlife research. A lot of rehabilitation facilities are non-profit organizations that rely on donations and grants to operate as the procedures needed for rehabilitating the individuals are often quite expensive to perform.

Climate change, habitat destruction, and pollution continue to drive the need for wildlife rehabilitation. Rehabilitators often care for animals affected by oil spills, wildfires, and other environmental disasters. They also play a key role in managing wildlife diseases like West Nile virus, avian influenza, and the spread of white-nose syndrome in bats.

However, wildlife rehabilitators face ongoing challenges, including limited funding, lack of resources, and the ethical dilemmas of when to euthanize severely injured or diseased animals. Despite these challenges, the field remains an essential part of modern conservation efforts.

In the process of wildlife rehabilitation there are many political and emotional considerations that are significant to humans as well as the medical and biological significance to the wildlife.

== Legal considerations ==
Wildlife rehabilitation is regulated by governmental agencies to ensure the safety and welfare of both animals and rehabilitators. In many countries, including the United States and Australia, wildlife rehabilitation requires a license or permit(s). In the U.S., the United States Fish and Wildlife Service (USFWS) oversees the rehabilitation of migratory birds under the Migratory Bird Treaty Act, while state and local agencies regulate the care of other species. The earliest set standards for the regulation of Wildlife Rehabilitation center was established through a collaboration between the NWRA and the IWRC in the 1980s. Both of these organizations contributed to the first edition of a 33-page booklet entitled Minimum Standards for Wildlife Organizations which suggested some alternatives for rehabilitators to conduct "self-regulation". Rehabilitators must obtain permits to handle and care for wild animals, and they must follow strict guidelines regarding their treatment and release. In these countries, it is against the law to rehabilitate (or in some cases possess) a wild animal without permits. If any endangered species is involved there are even more regulations and permits needed to handle them. There are also certain regulations at a local level that may limit or ban particular species or require specific housing for these species. If a center is open to tours from the public, they may be subject to more guidelines similar to the guidelines used to manage zoos and research facilities. Overall, the requirements vary from state to state.

The only birds rehabilitators can admit without a federal permit are common birds considered to be introduced invasive species such as rock doves, European starlings, and house sparrows; although many licensed rehabilitation facilities cannot accept introduced species as a condition of their licensing. Not only is it illegal for many licensed wildlife rehabilitators to release non-native wildlife, most introduced species are harmful to native species and ecosystems . Some states would choose not to approach the issue of wildlife rehabilitation directly, believing that natural occurrences should take place naturally, instead they would transform zoos and other qualified organizations into housings for a limited amount of "orphan" animals. Meanwhile other states will prohibit wildlife rehabilitation in its entirety outlining specific consequences for any violations,

The federal government also mandates rehabilitators to also collaborate and work with licensed veterinarians. They are not required to possess a special permit for euthanization and other temporary procedures to treat an injured wildlife. There are also certain regulations surrounding the frequency of veterinary intervention, which means that not every animal admitted to a wildlife rehabilitation center require treatment from a veterinarian. The American Veterinary Medical Association frames the definition of veterinary medicine as the act of administering help to ease any types of physical or mental conditions by any means necessary.

Safety is another big consideration when it comes to the regulation of rehabilitation centers where there are often uninformed or misinformed volunteers working with possibly dangerous wild animals. There is even a risk with the capture of animals as their stress when injured can lead to them lashing out and injuring those attempting to capture them. Furthermore, the animals can cause serious trauma and injury if not handled properly or may carry disease or parasites that can infect the humans working with them. This type of animal-transmitted disease is called zoonoses, and there is a greater chance of infection spread when humans make contact with livestock products and their environments with threats and is further perpetuated by the chance in global climate and agricultural practices. For safety precautions, wildlife rehabilitators should wear protective equipment and practice safe, species-specific handling techniques.

== Services provided by wildlife rehabilitators ==
The heart of wildlife rehabilitation is to care and treat for wildlife who are injured, sick, or in need of any additional support. The specialization of certain methods to treat for these wildlife are what differs wildlife rehabilitation from certain veterinary practices. While euthanasia remains a controversial topic, it remains an imperative part of the rehabilitation process when there are not any other alternative treatments to cure the pain. The specialized services integrate the veterinary practice, the study of animal behavior with public service and education. Rehabilitators often act as an intermediary between the government, wildlife conservation organizations and the public through different avenues such as school visits, on-site tours and off-site presentations as well as shedding public awareness on the boundaries between the wildlife ecosystem and public facilities like roads and highways. Furthermore, wildlife rehabilitation also contribute significantly to scientific and environmental research as most of the case studies can be utilized as an important source and reference to elaborate on a subject material.

== Gallery ==
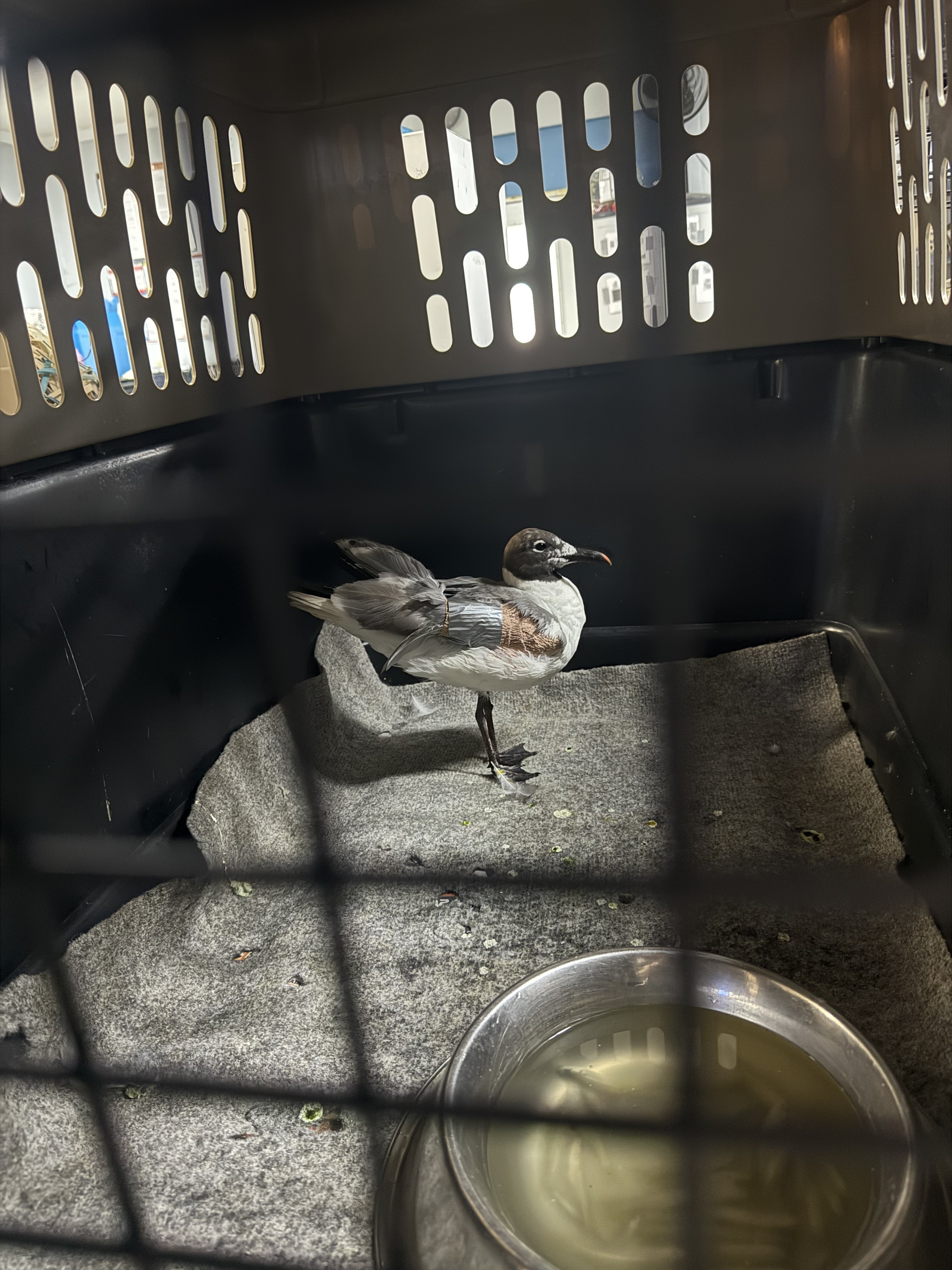
Laughing Gull being treated for wing injury and malnutrition

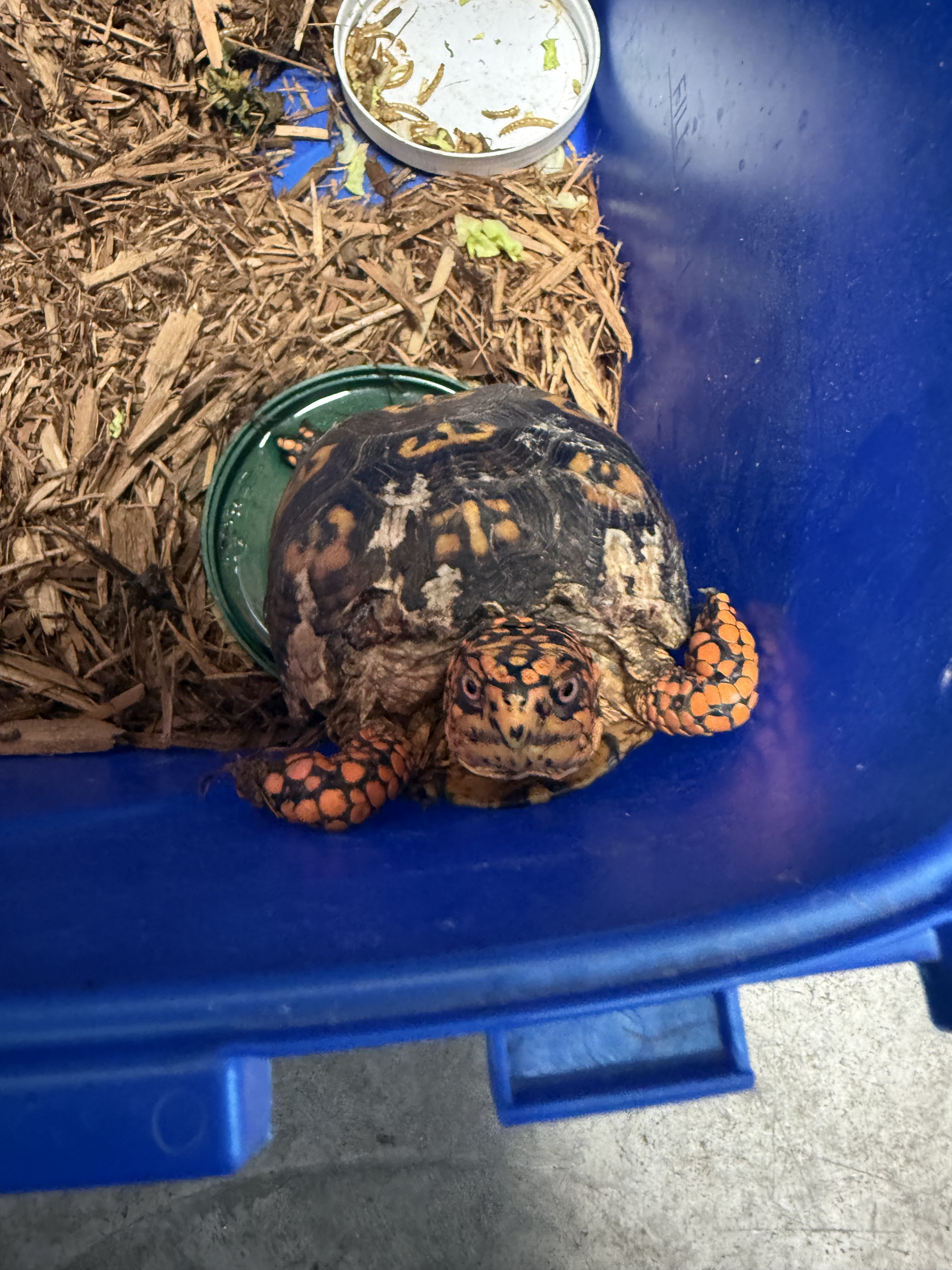
Eastern Box Turtle trying to escape its enclosure while in rehabilitation process.

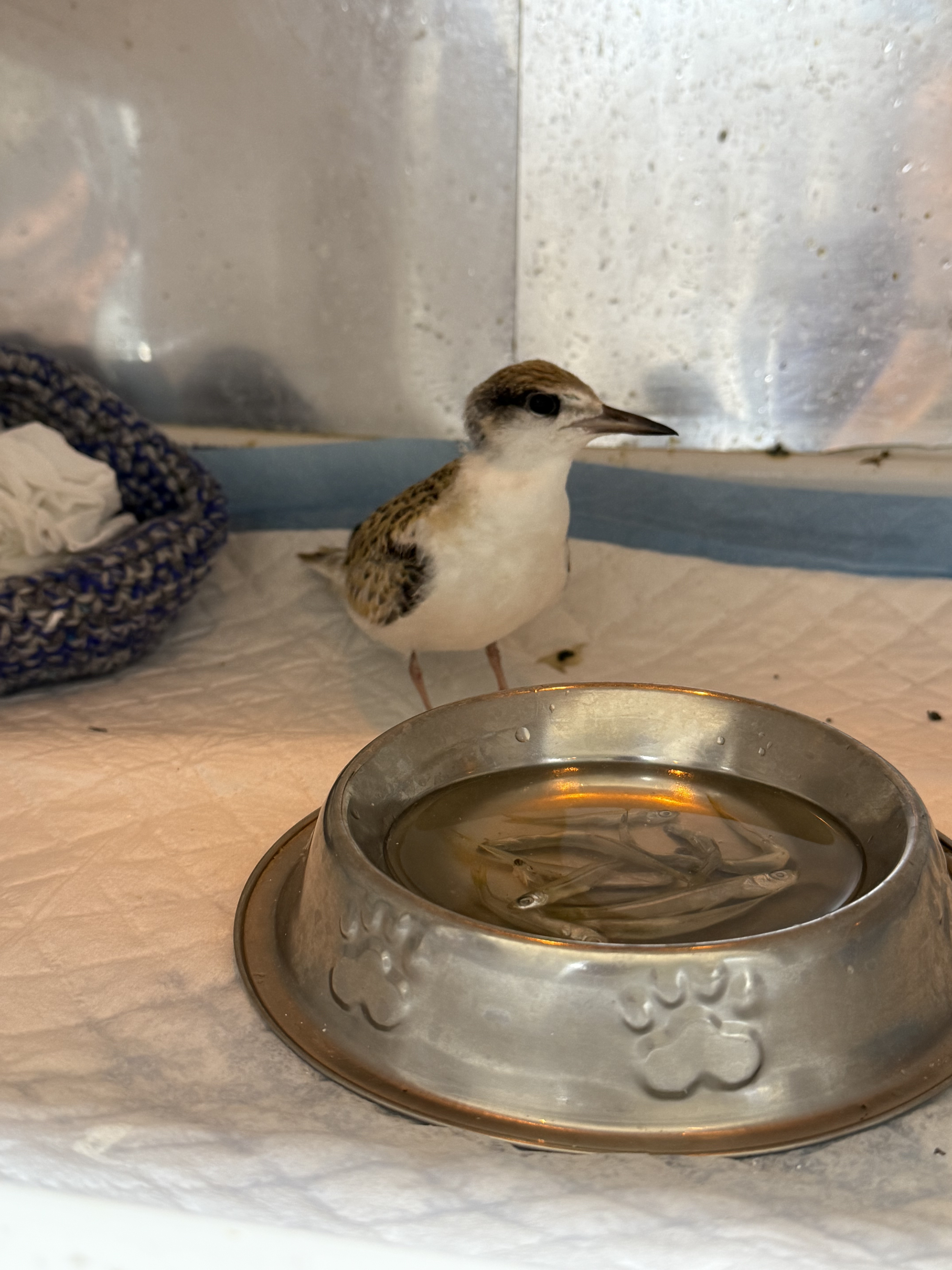
Young Least Tern waiting to be weighed and hand-fed by rehabbers.

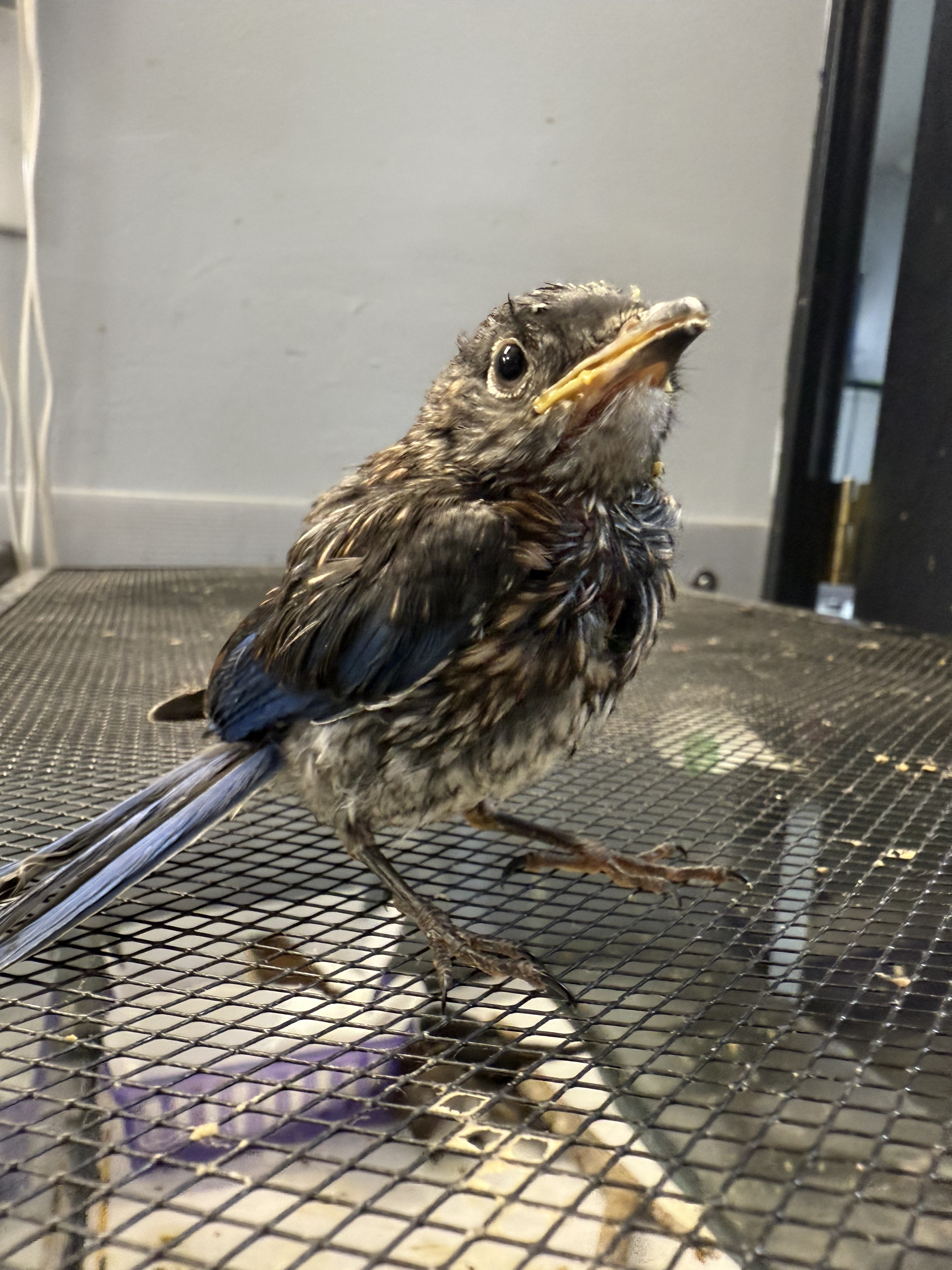
Blind juvenile Eastern Bluebird on top of enclosure waiting to be fed and treated with eye drops.

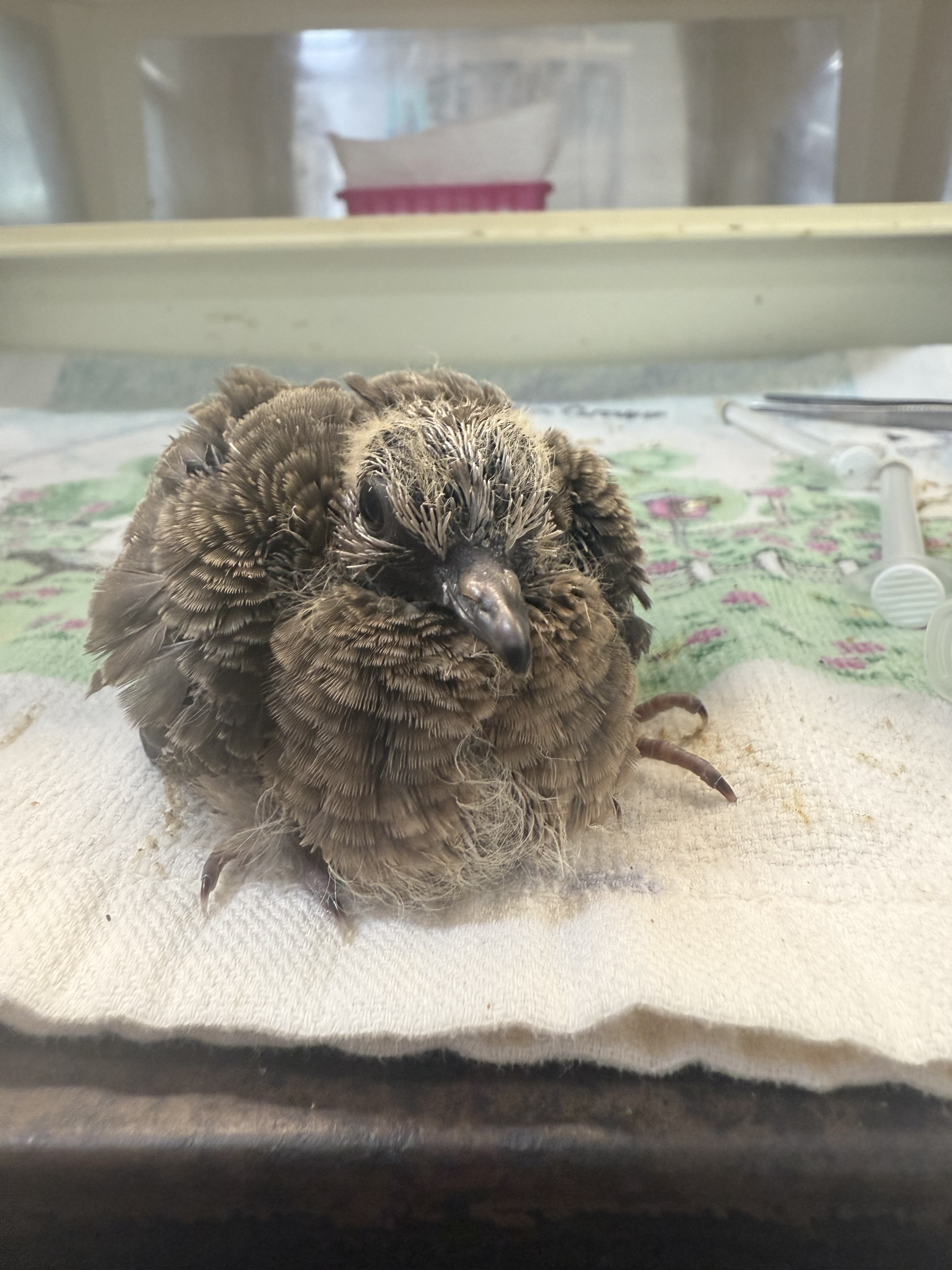
Juvenile Mourning Dove sitting on the table of rehabilitation facility after being tube fed for the evening.

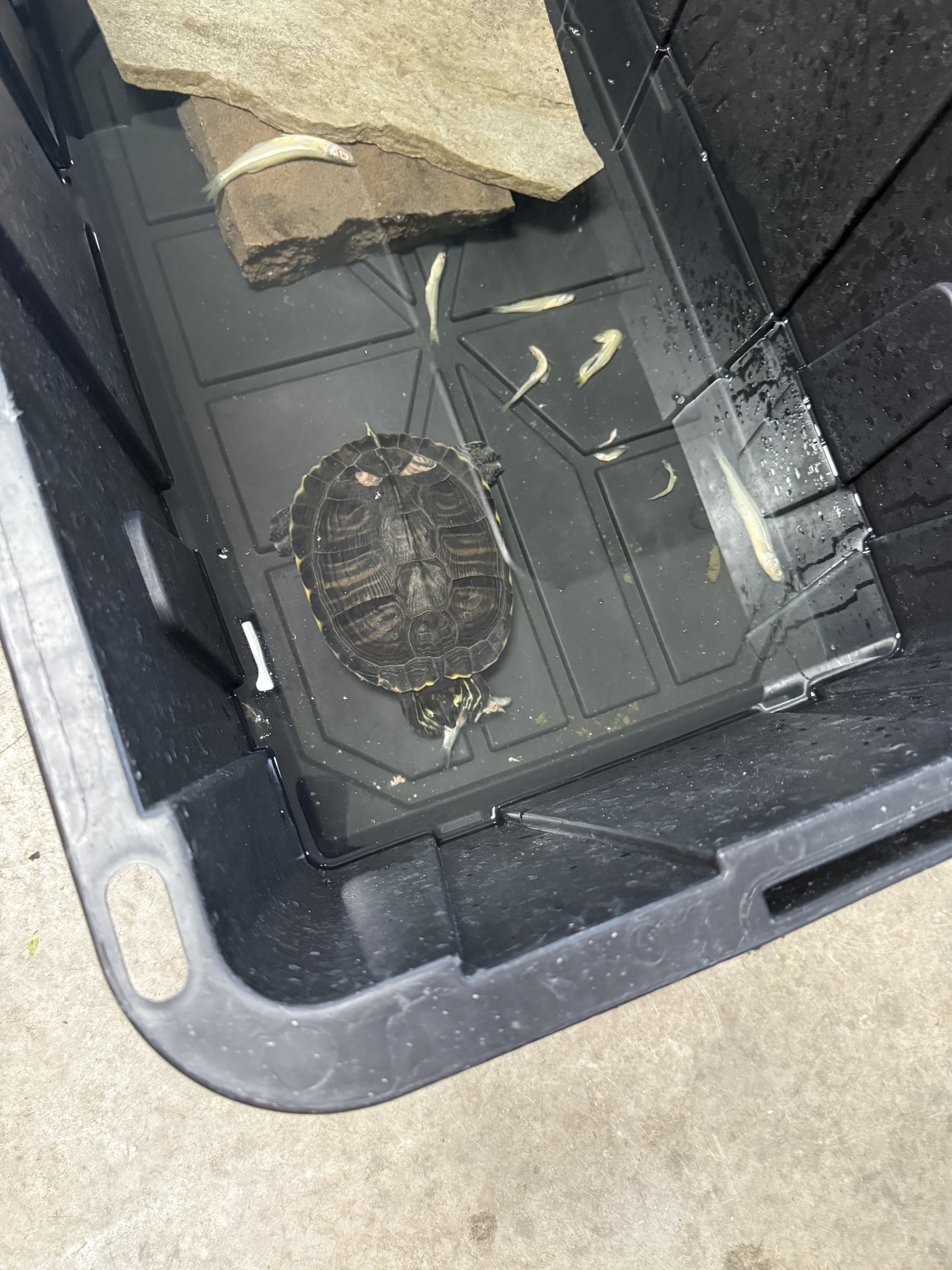
Yellow-bellied slider eating a fish in its temporary enclosure before being released.

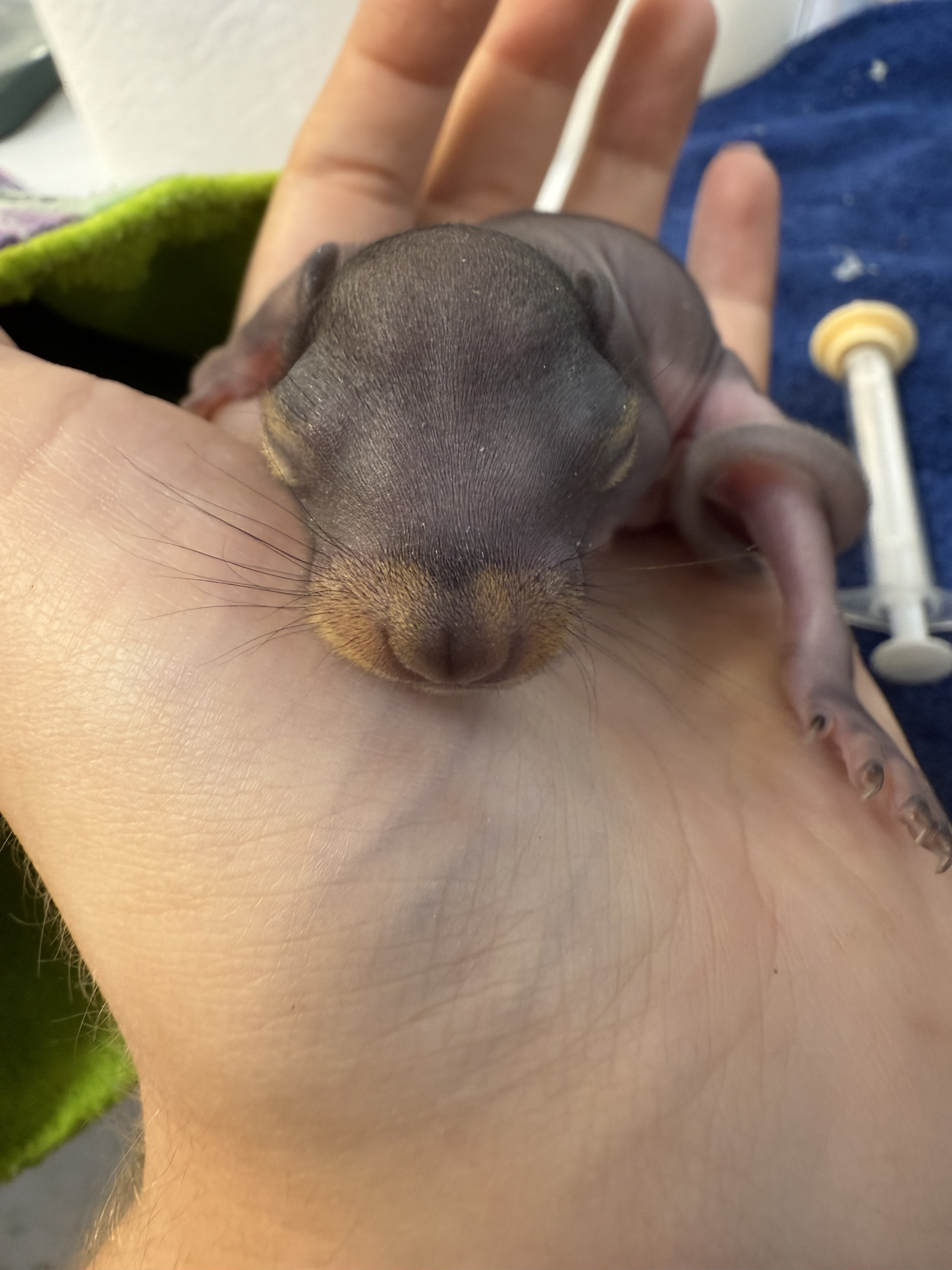
Baby Eastern Gray Squirrel being held by rehabber before being fed.

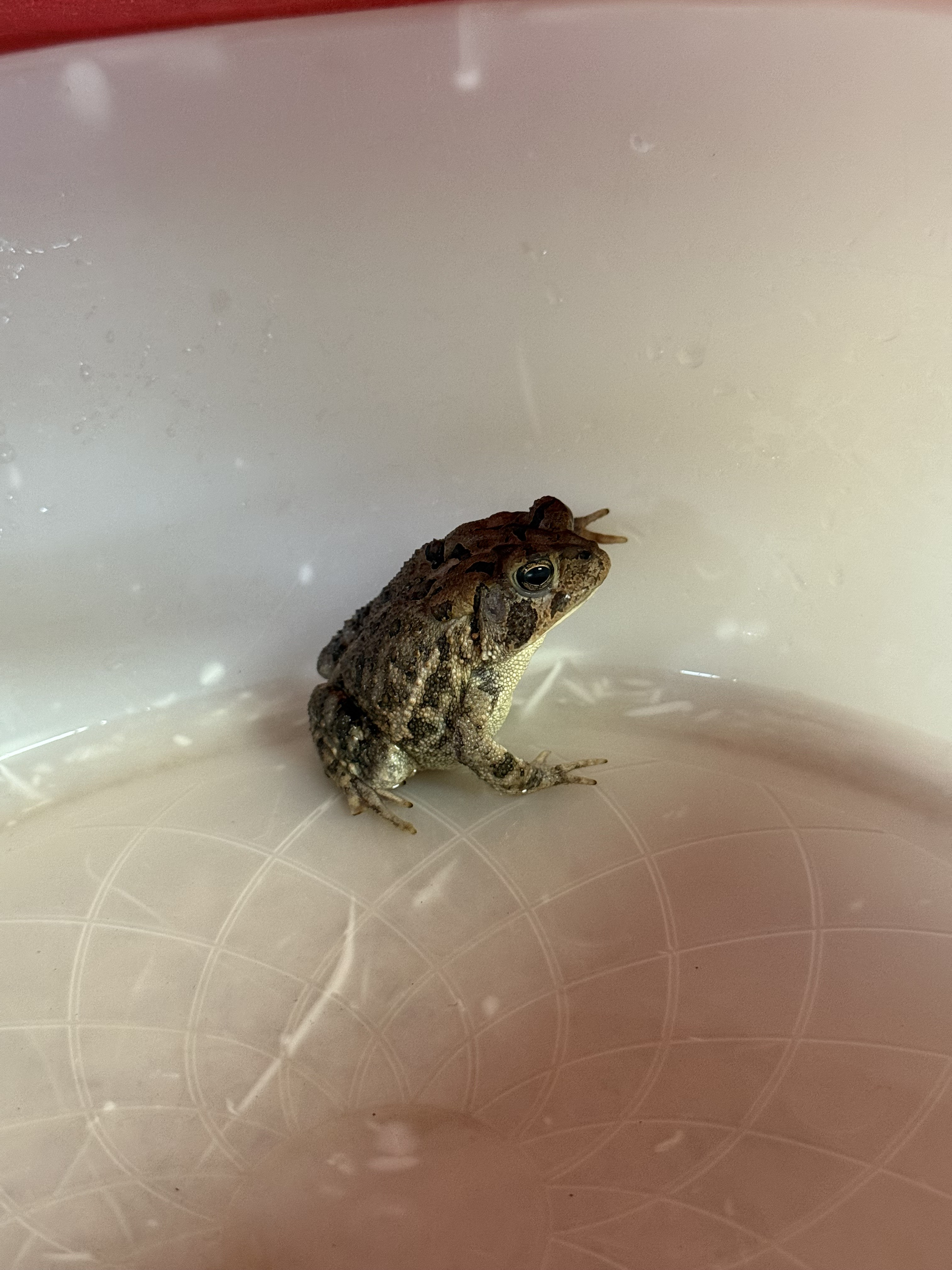
American toad recovering from a weed Wacker strike that cut off its back leg.

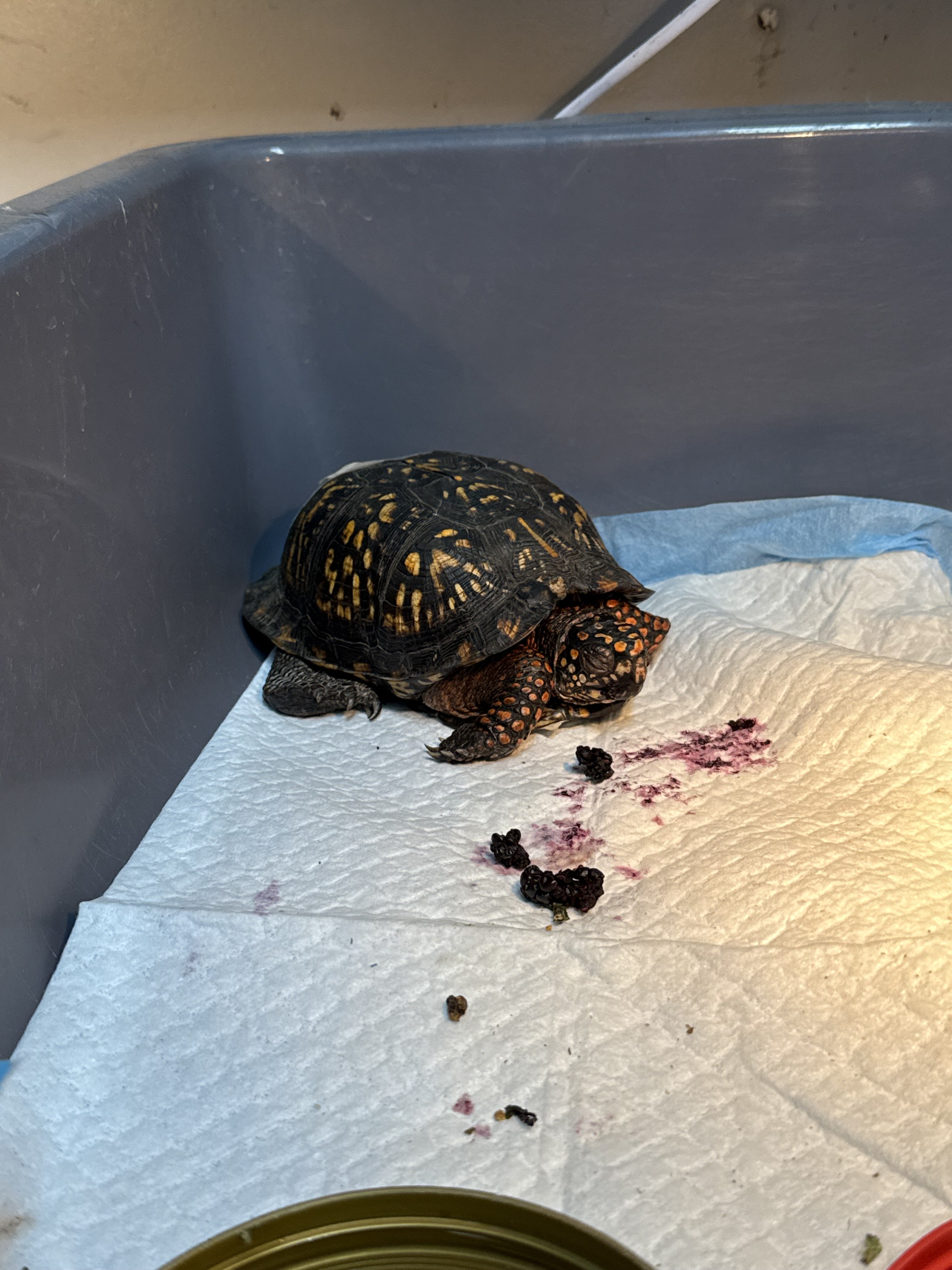
Eastern Box Turtle in recovery after a vehicle strike.

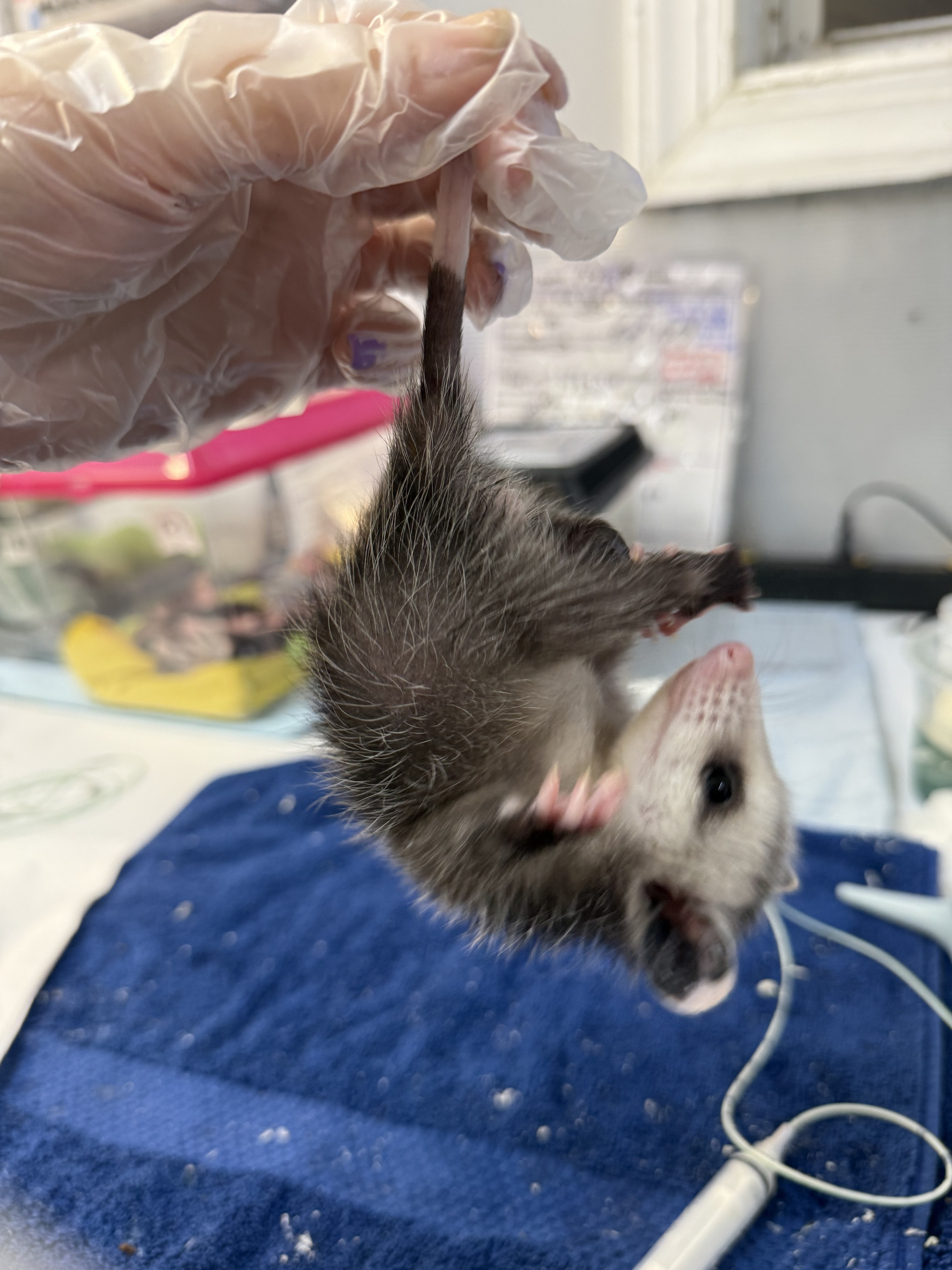
Juvenile Virginia Opossum working on the use of its prehensile tail while being tube fed for the evening.

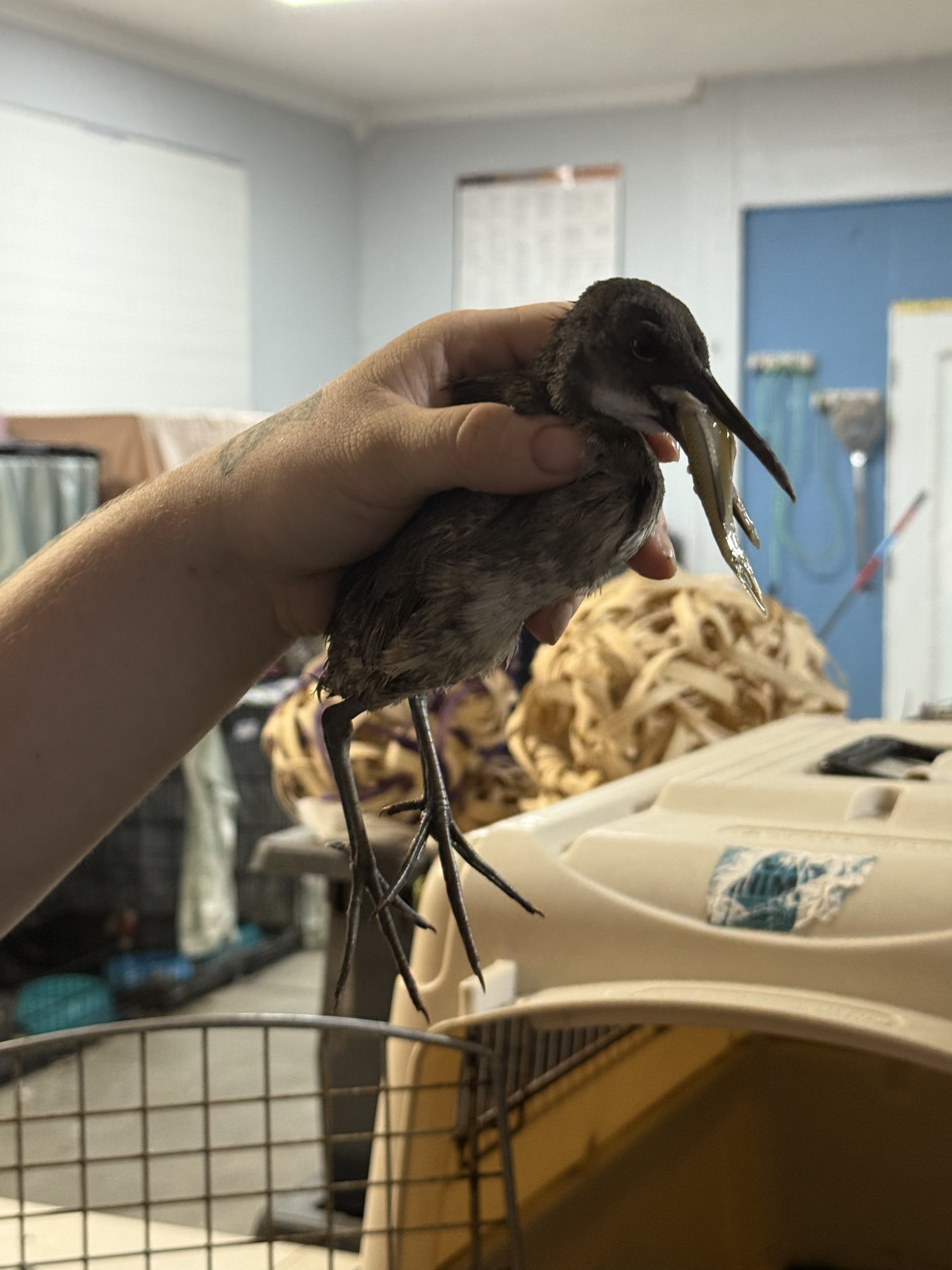
Tern being force fed a fish after being admitted for malnutrition and abandonment.

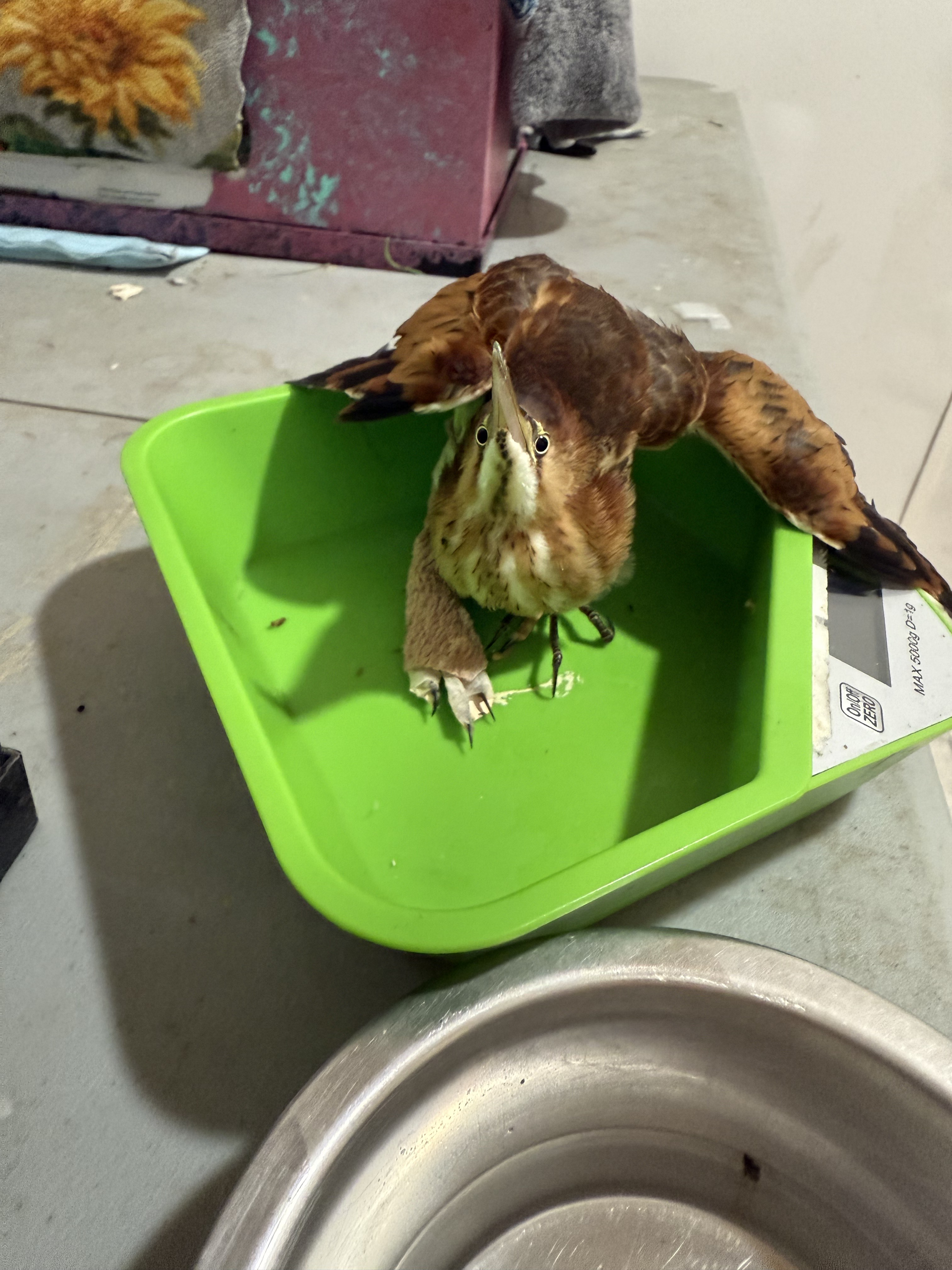
Least Bittern being weighed after being treated for a fractured leg.

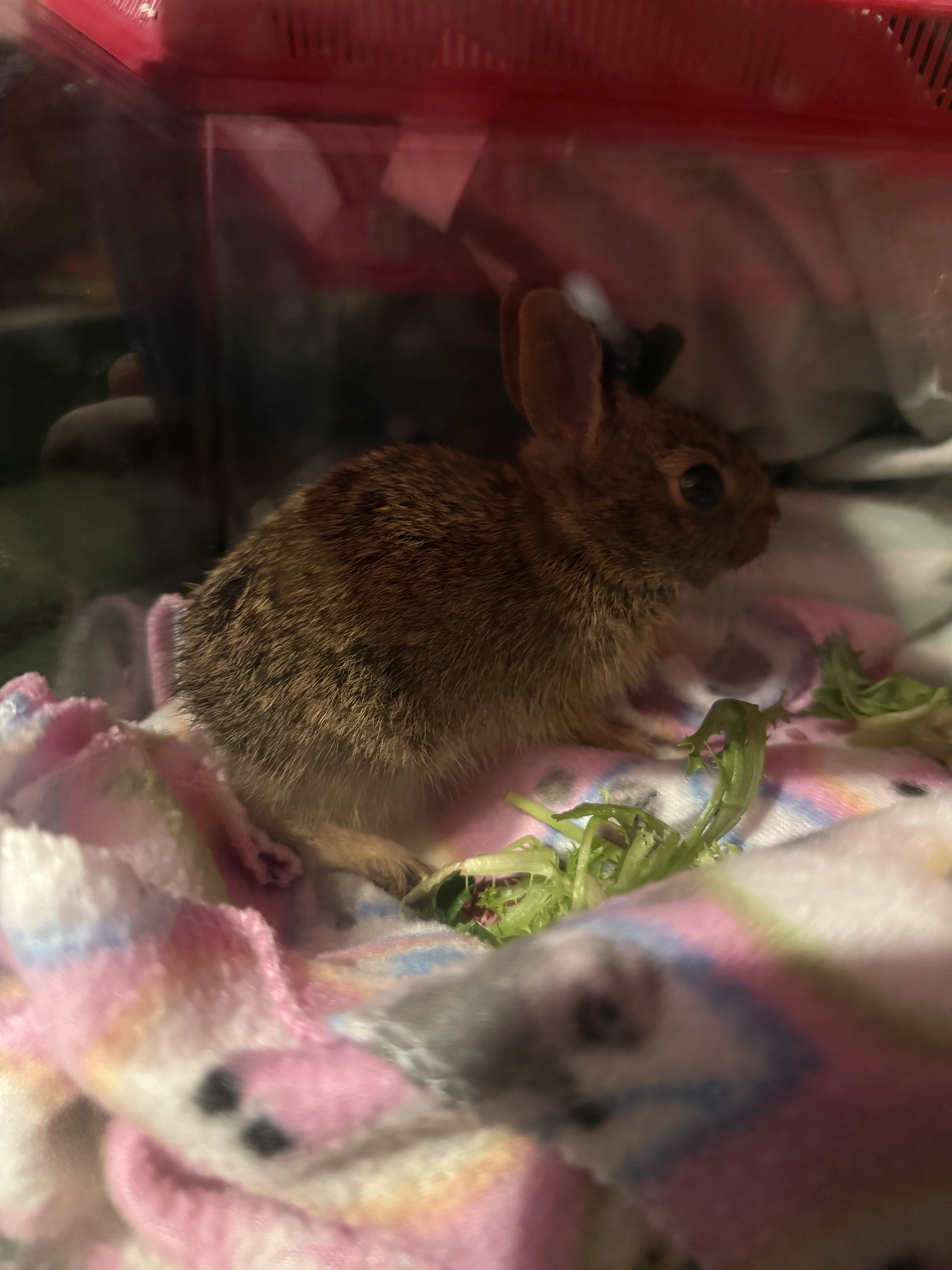
Eastern Cottontail in a holding box before being released.

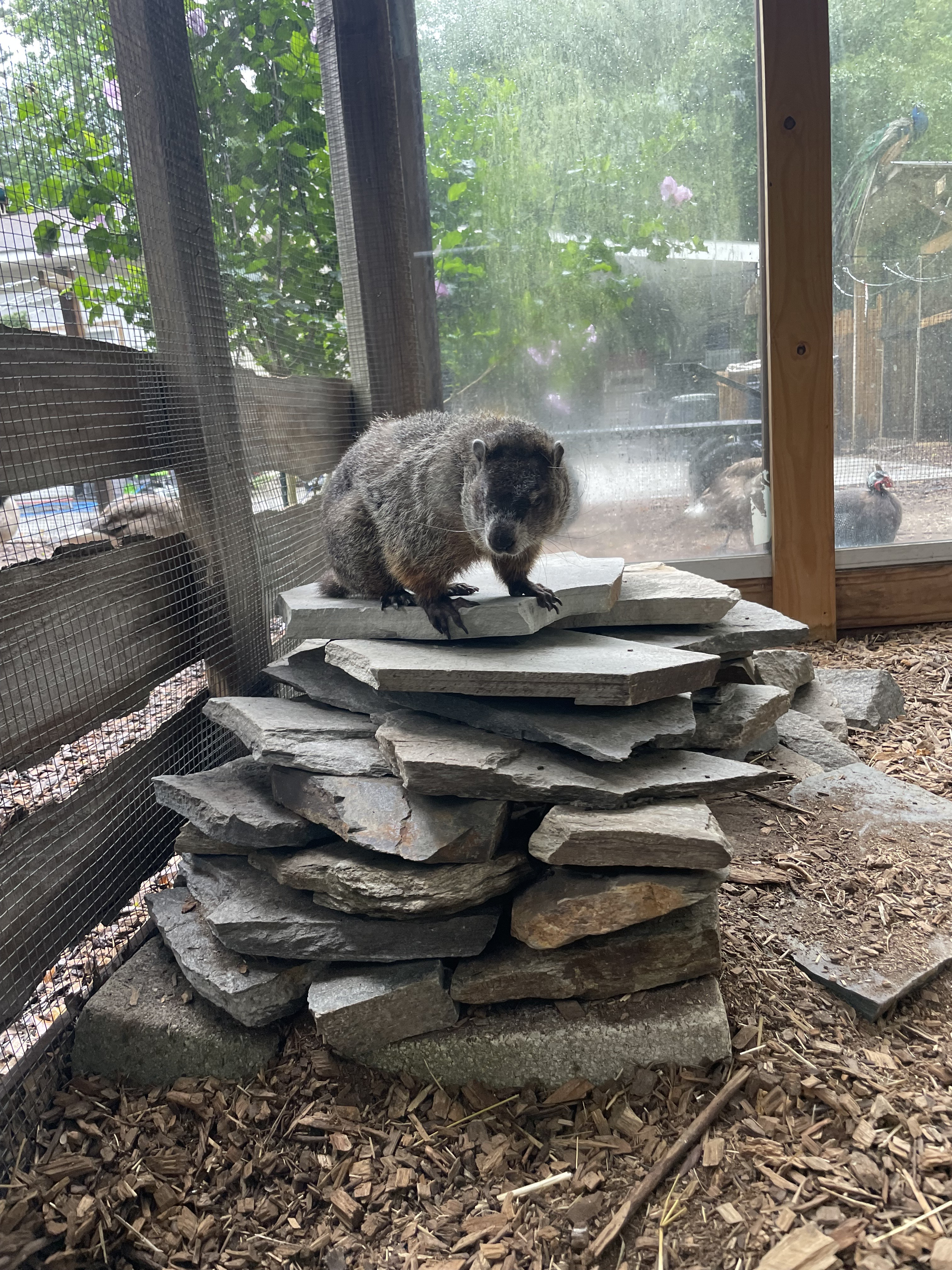
'Puck' the groundhog ambassador in his enclosure while being fed for the day.

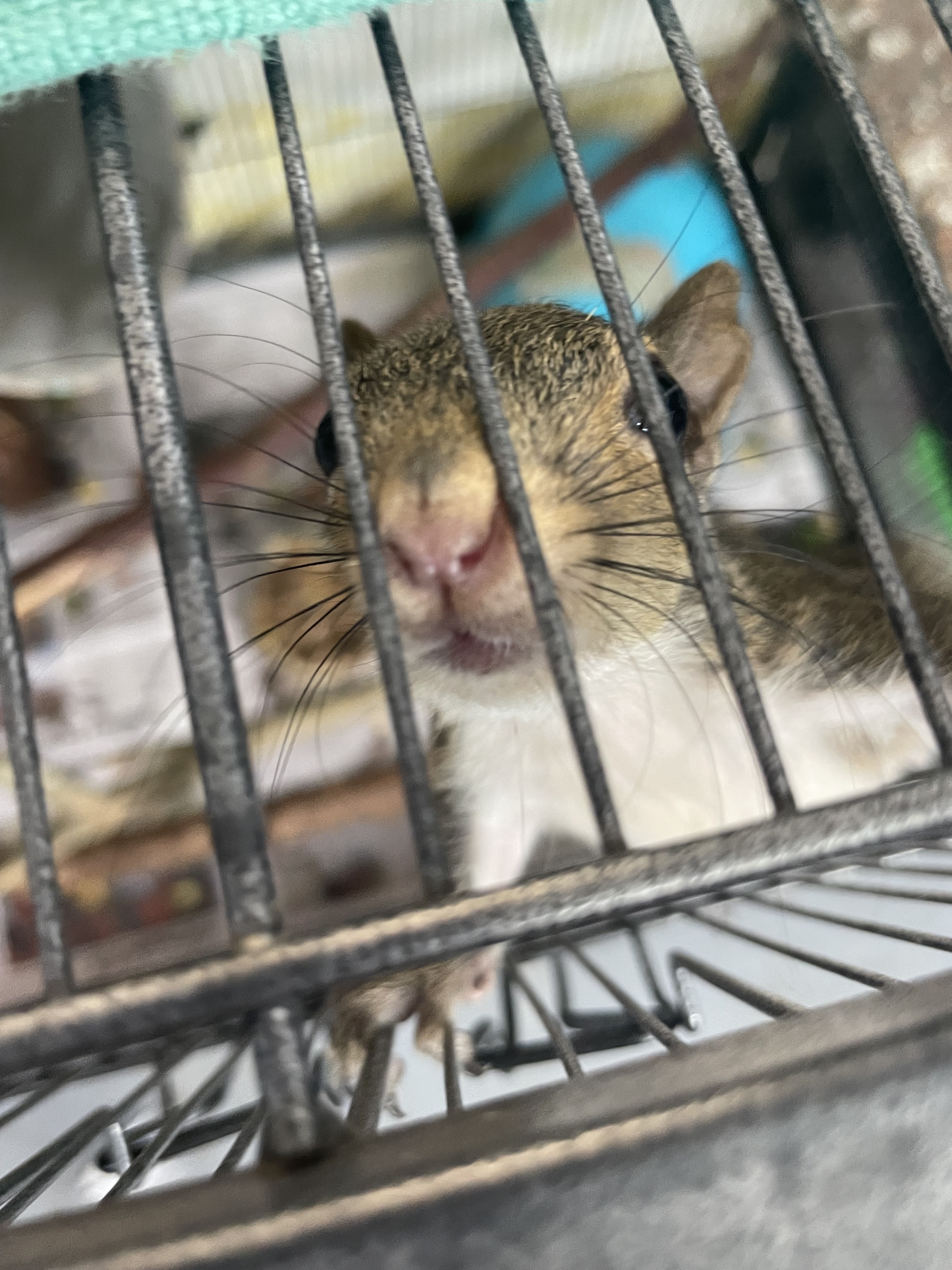
Baby Grey Squirrel in rehabilitation facility waiting to be syringe fed.

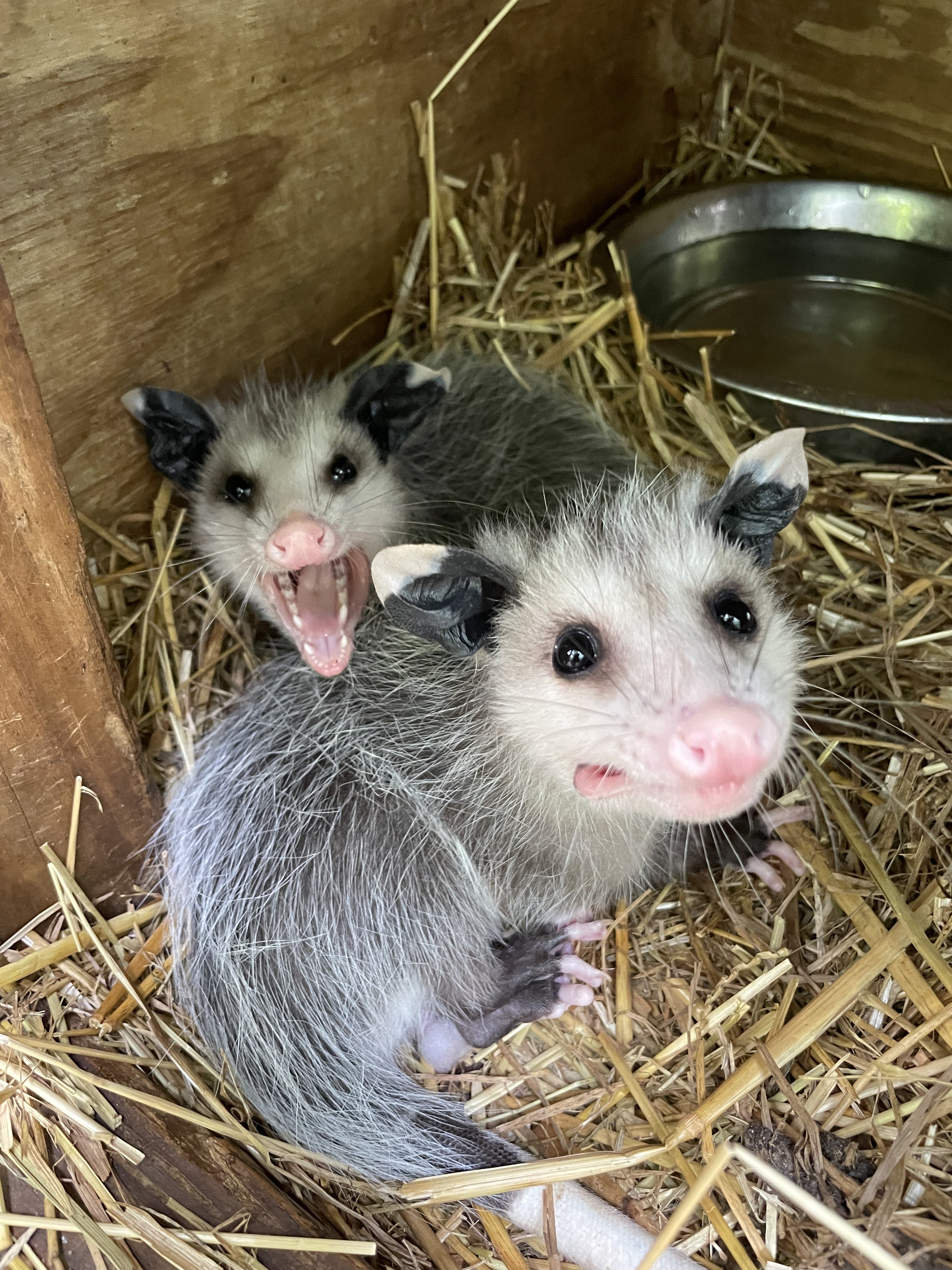
Virginia Opossums in an outdoor hutch getting ready to be released.

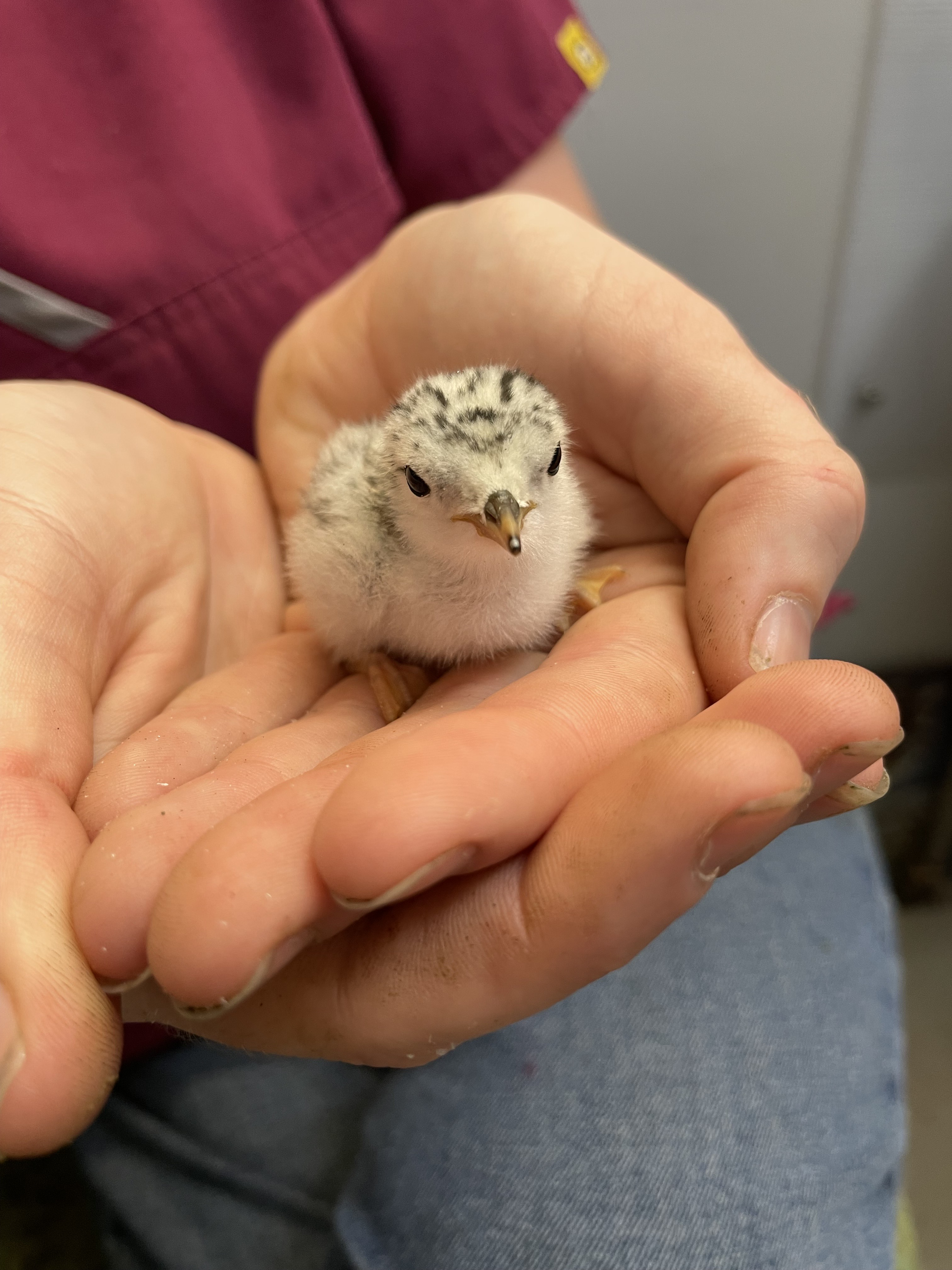
Baby Least tern being held by a rehabber after being admitted.

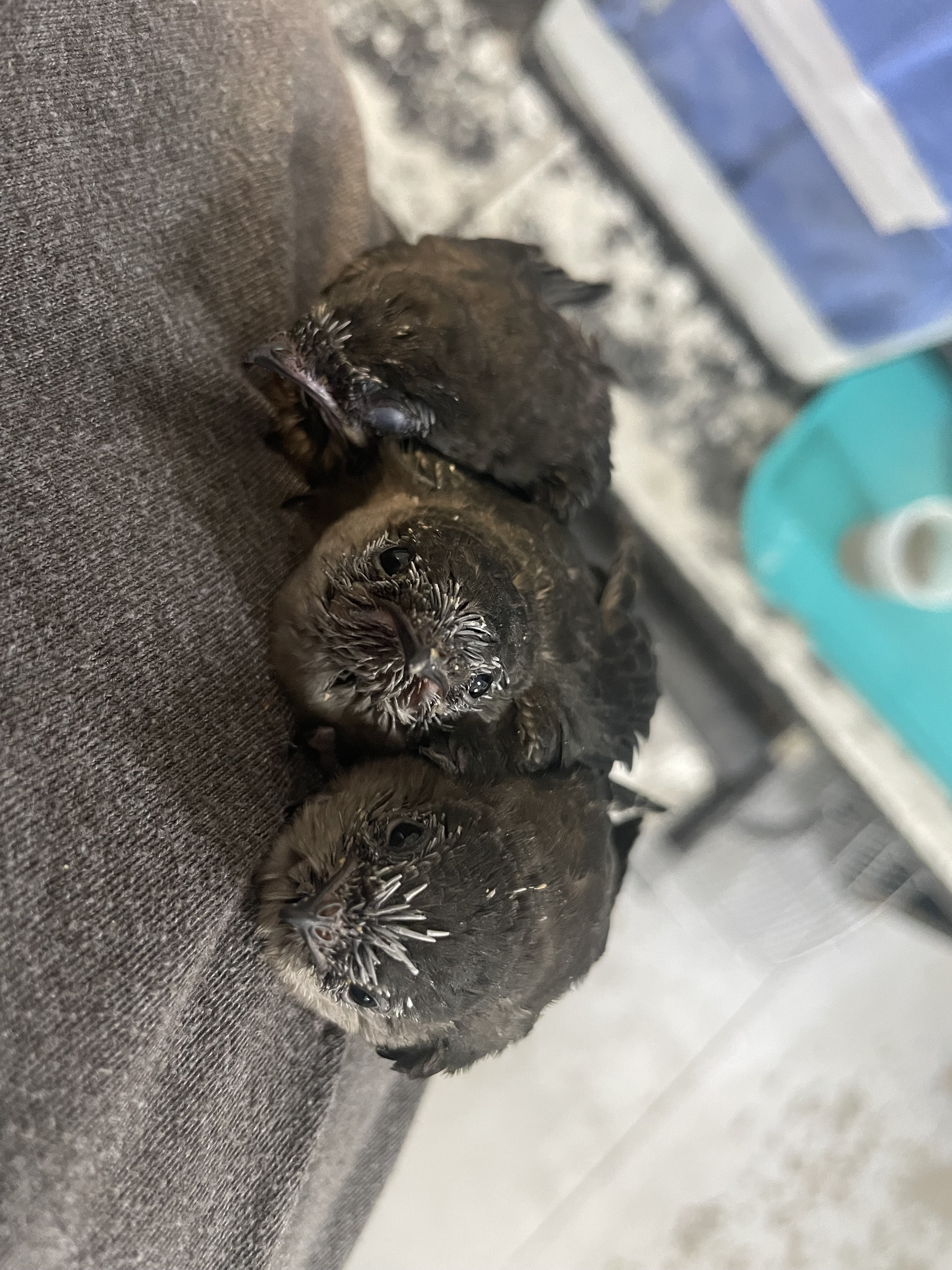
Chimney swifts waiting to be fed by handler.

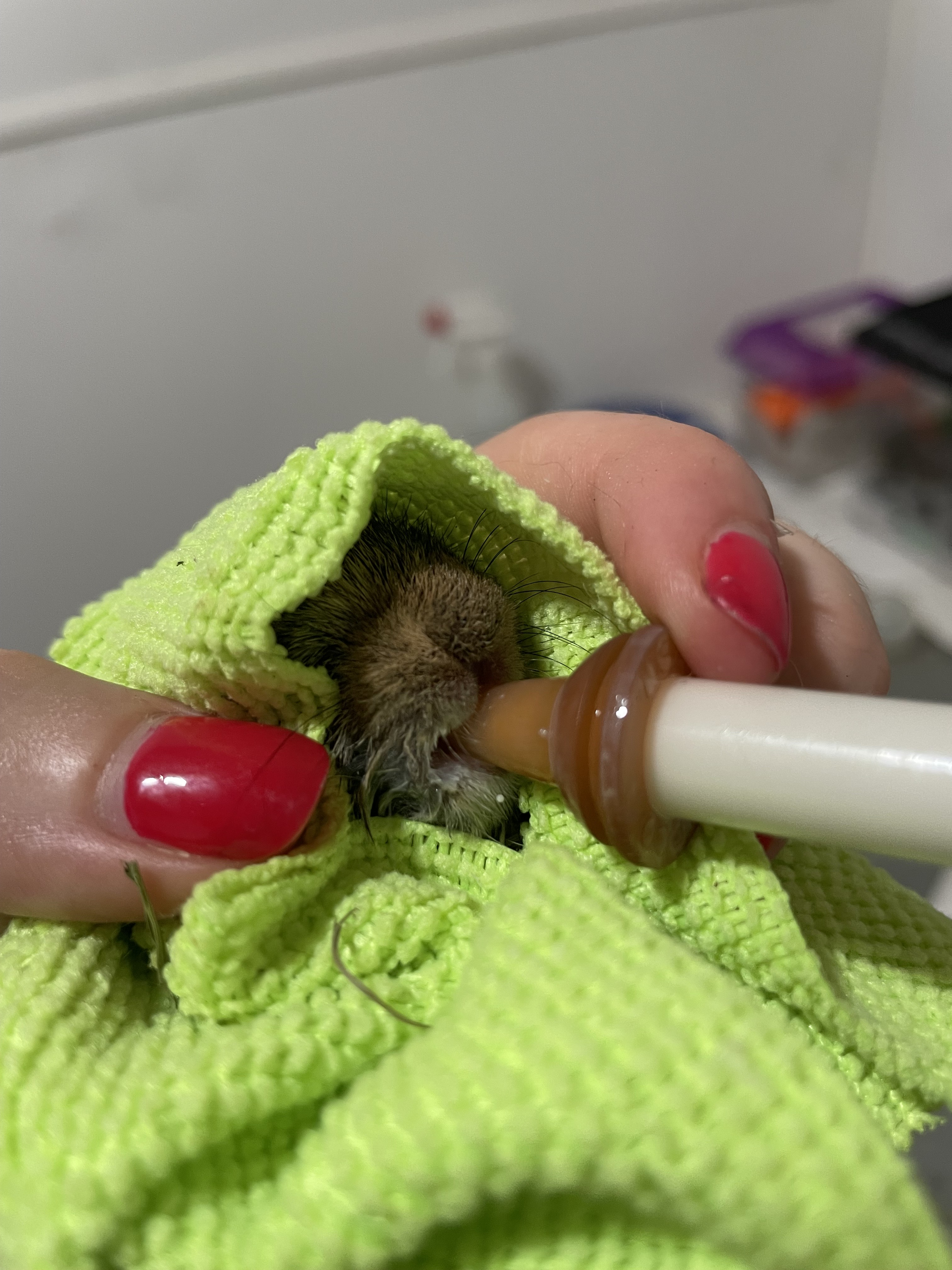
Eastern Cottontail being fed by syringe, eyes are covered to reduce stress.

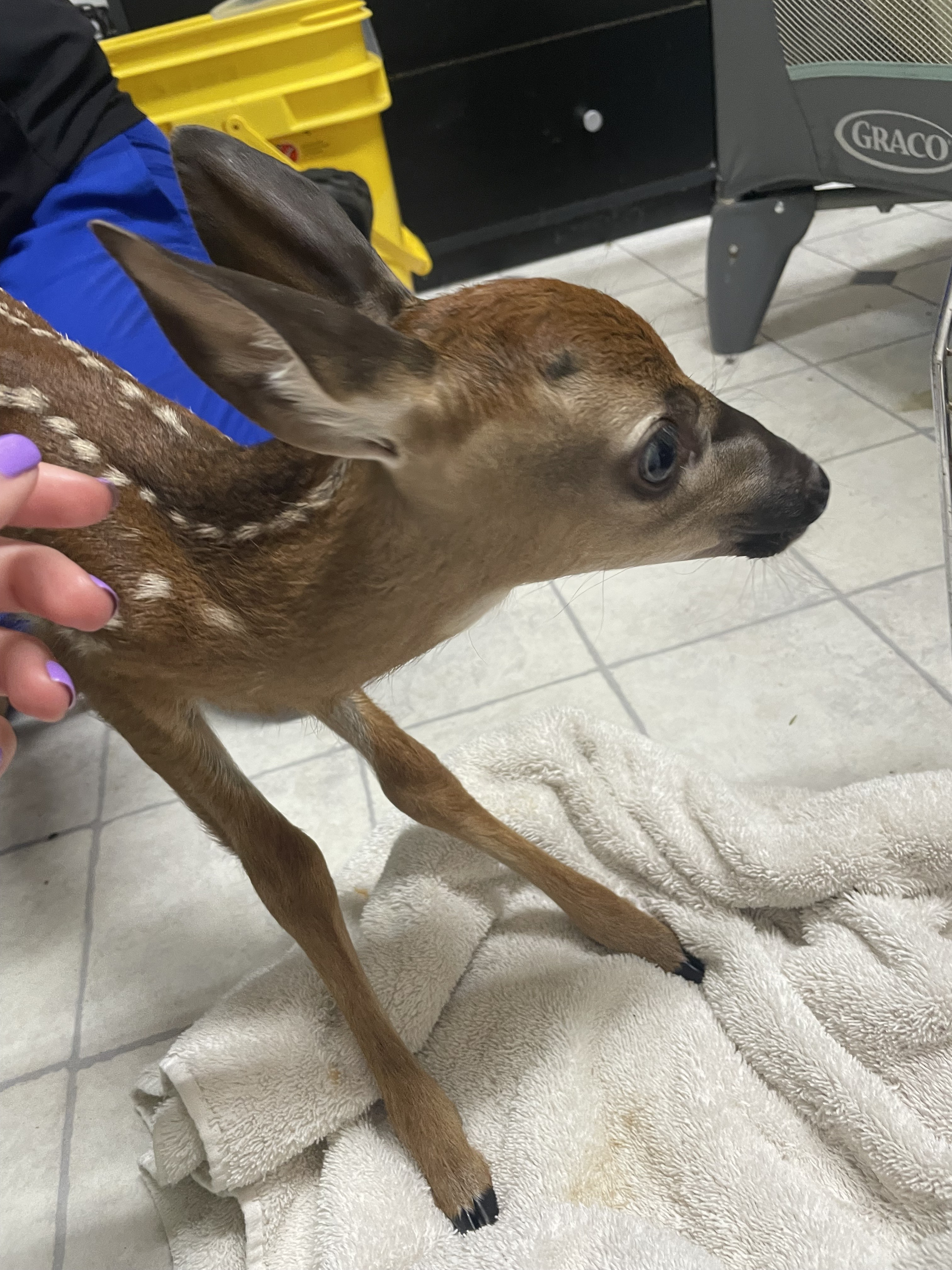
Baby White-tailed Deer being checked for injuries before being transported to another facility.

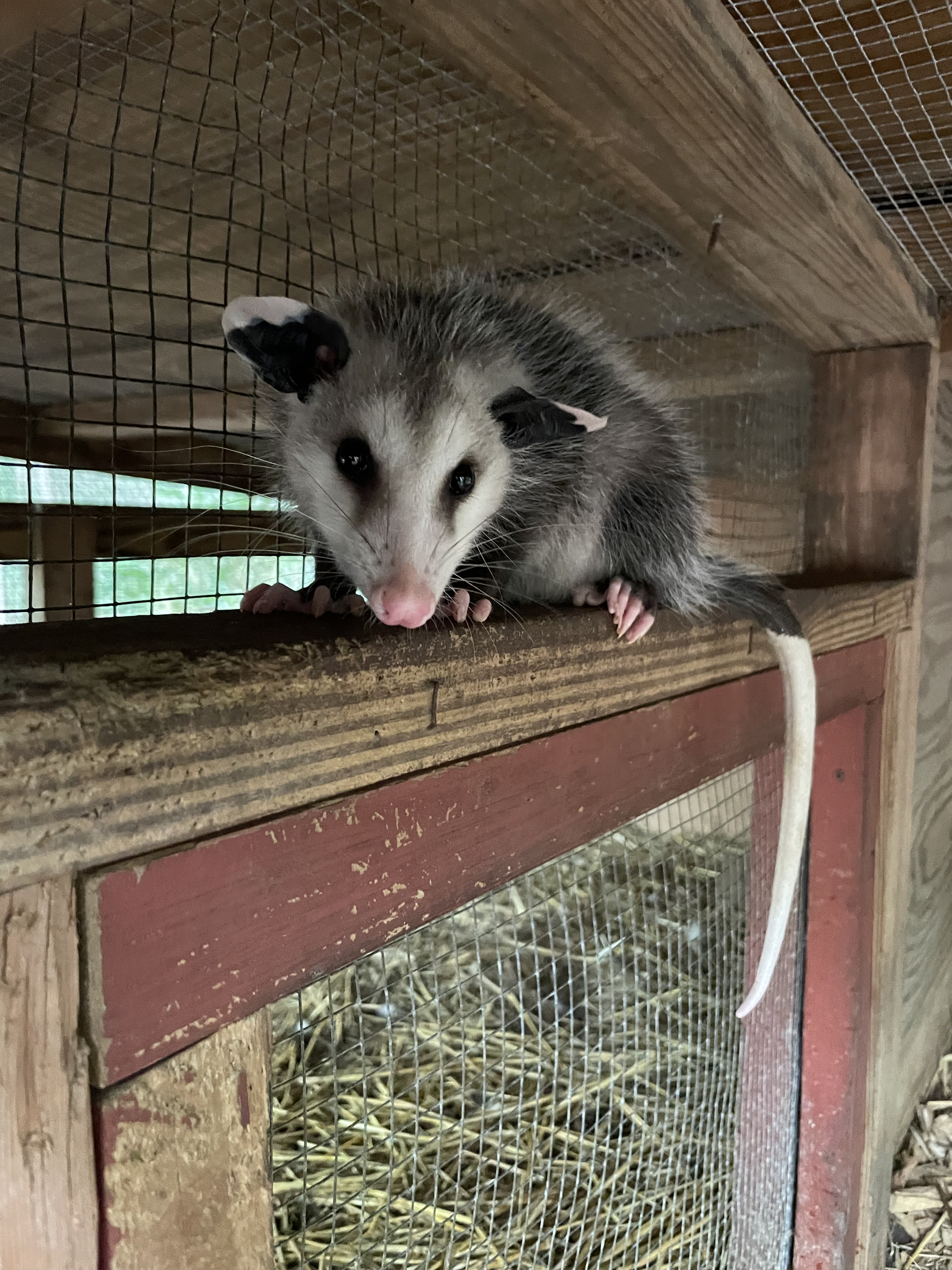
Virginia Opossum in an outdoor hutch for rehabilitation.

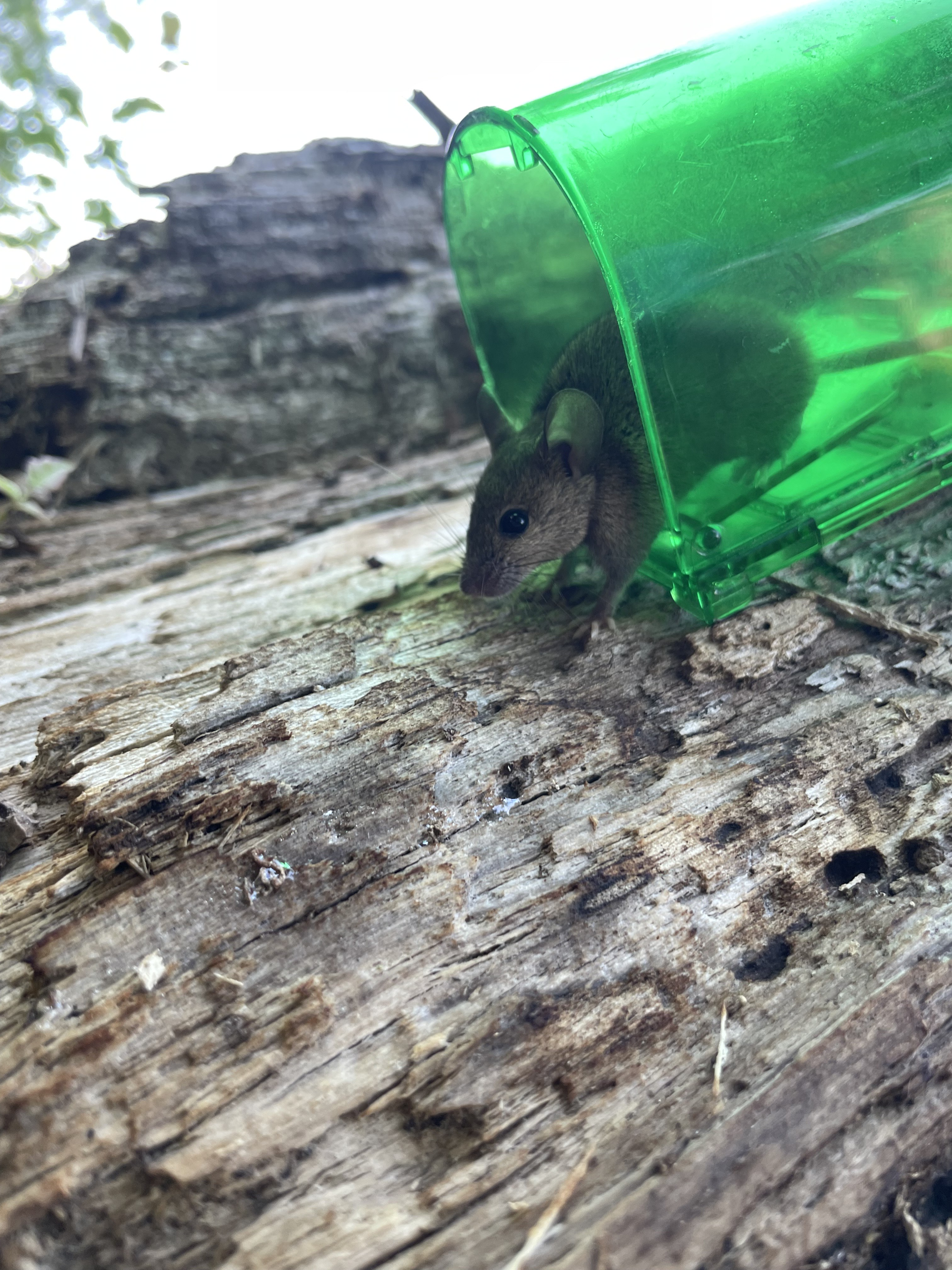
Field Mouse being released after being caught on the property of rehab facility.

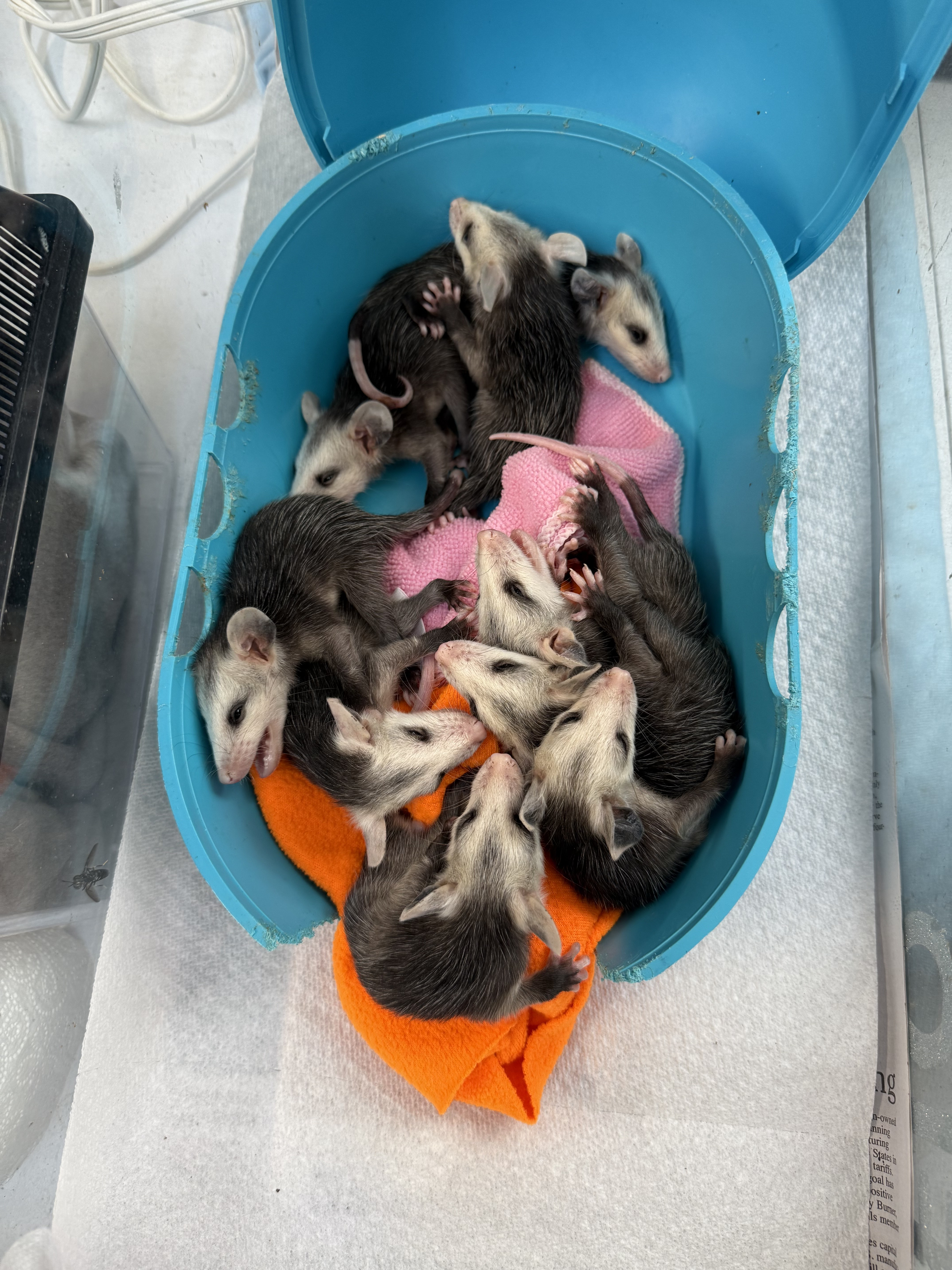
Baby Virginia Opossums sleeping in their enclosure before being fed during their rehabilitation process.

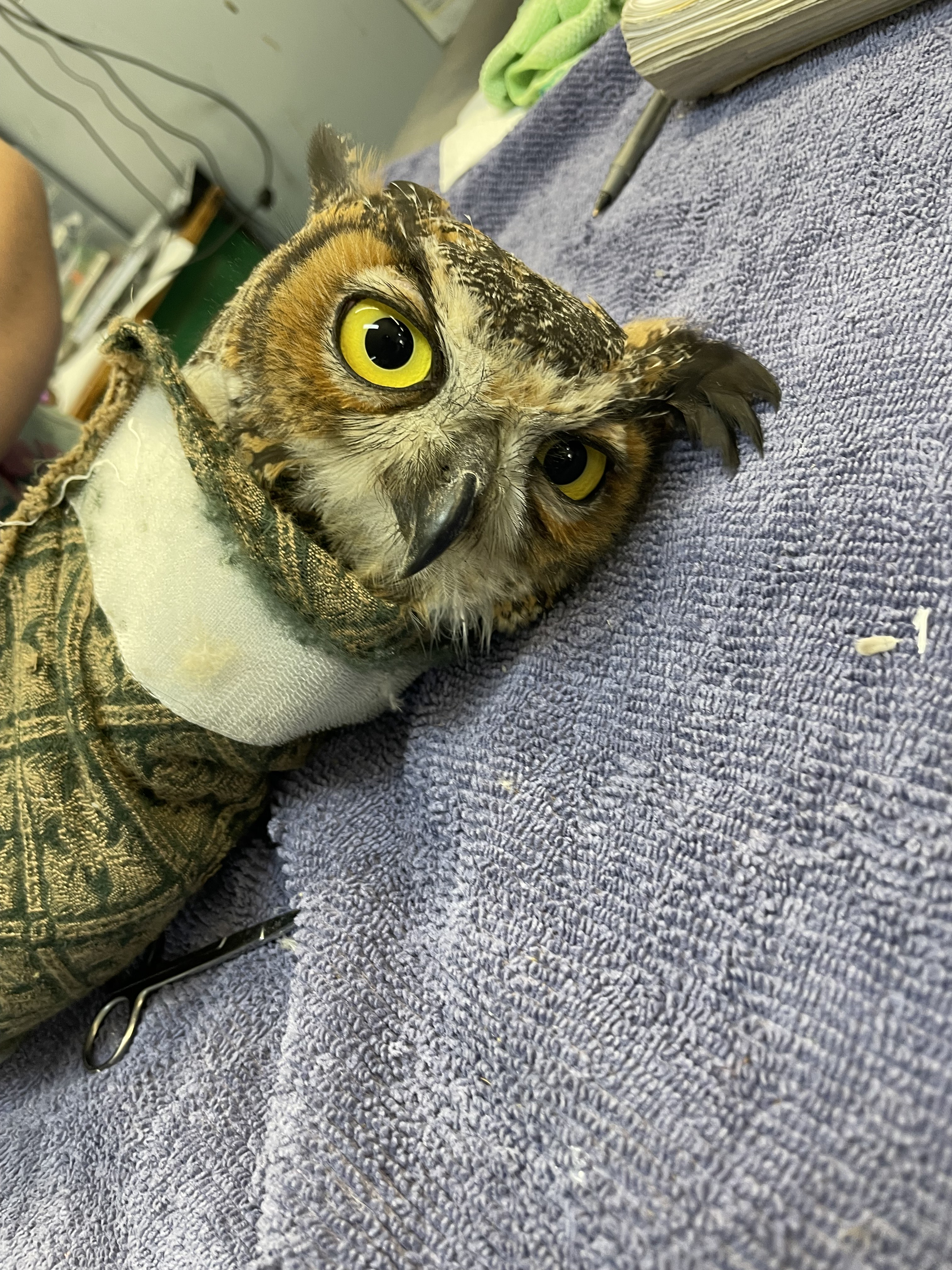
Great Horned Owl being wrapped up to be weighed after admitted.

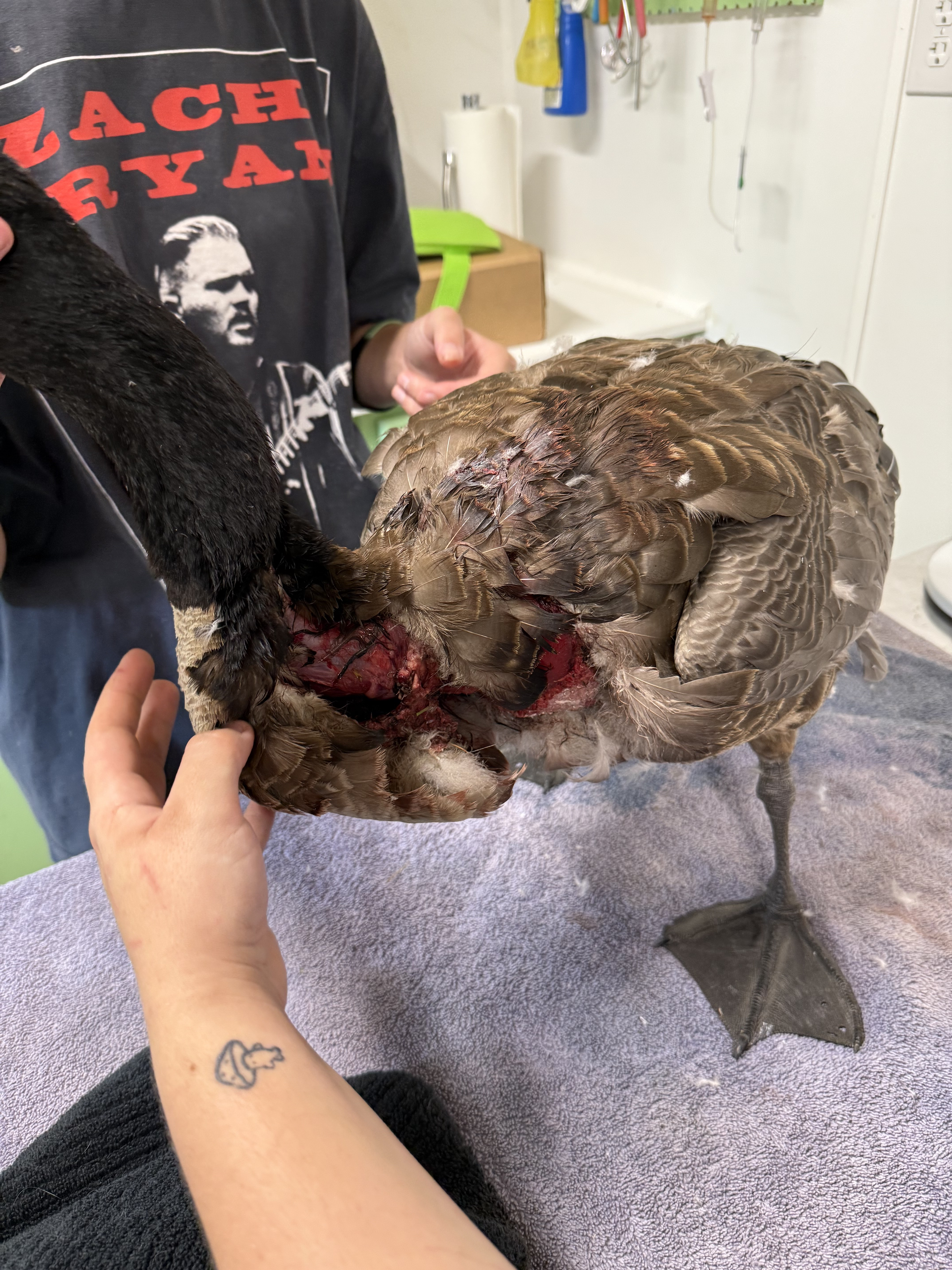
Canada Goose being checked for severity of injury after being struck by a car.

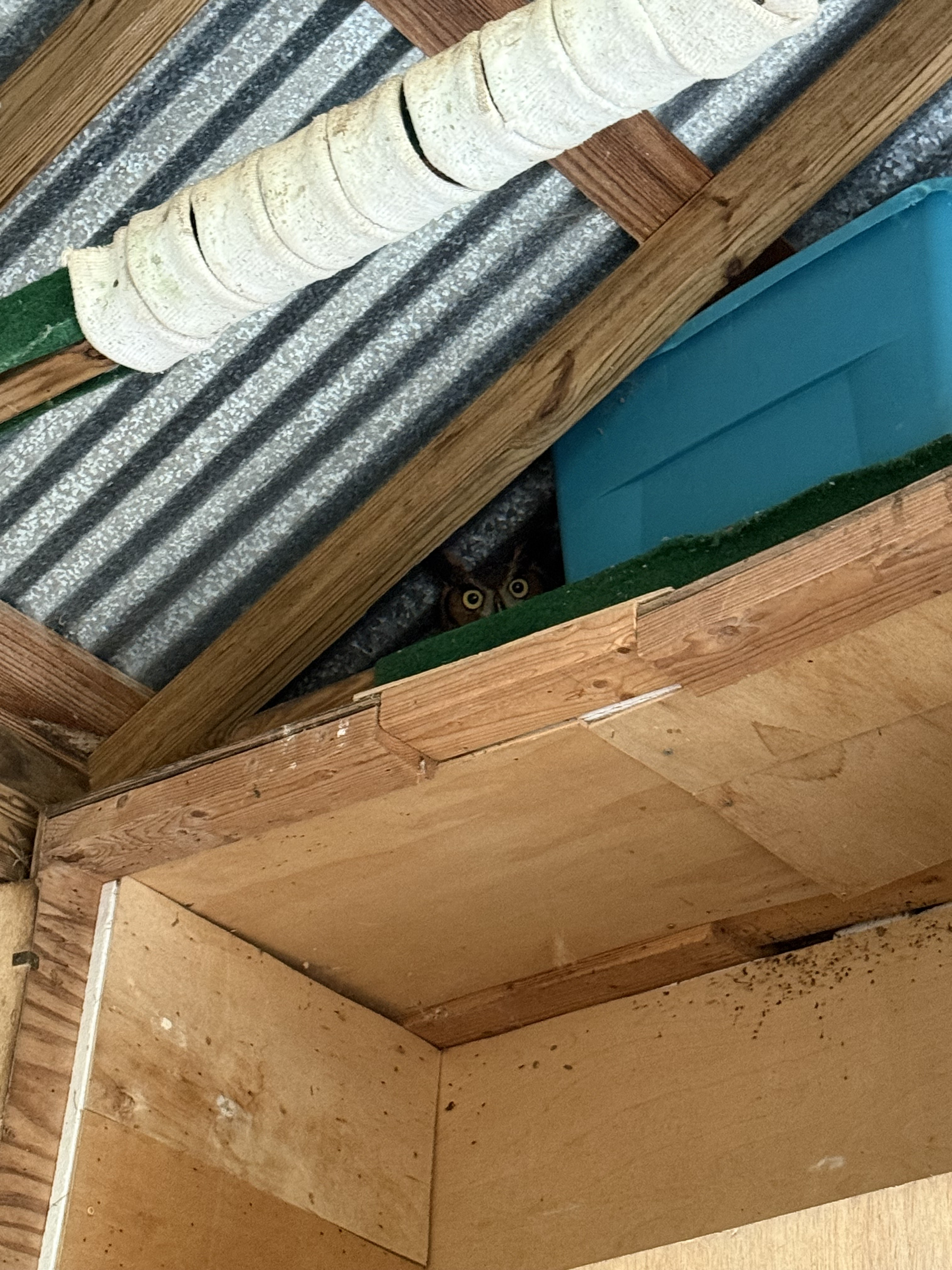
Great Horned Owl ambassador hiding in his enclosure while food is being laid out for better enrichment.

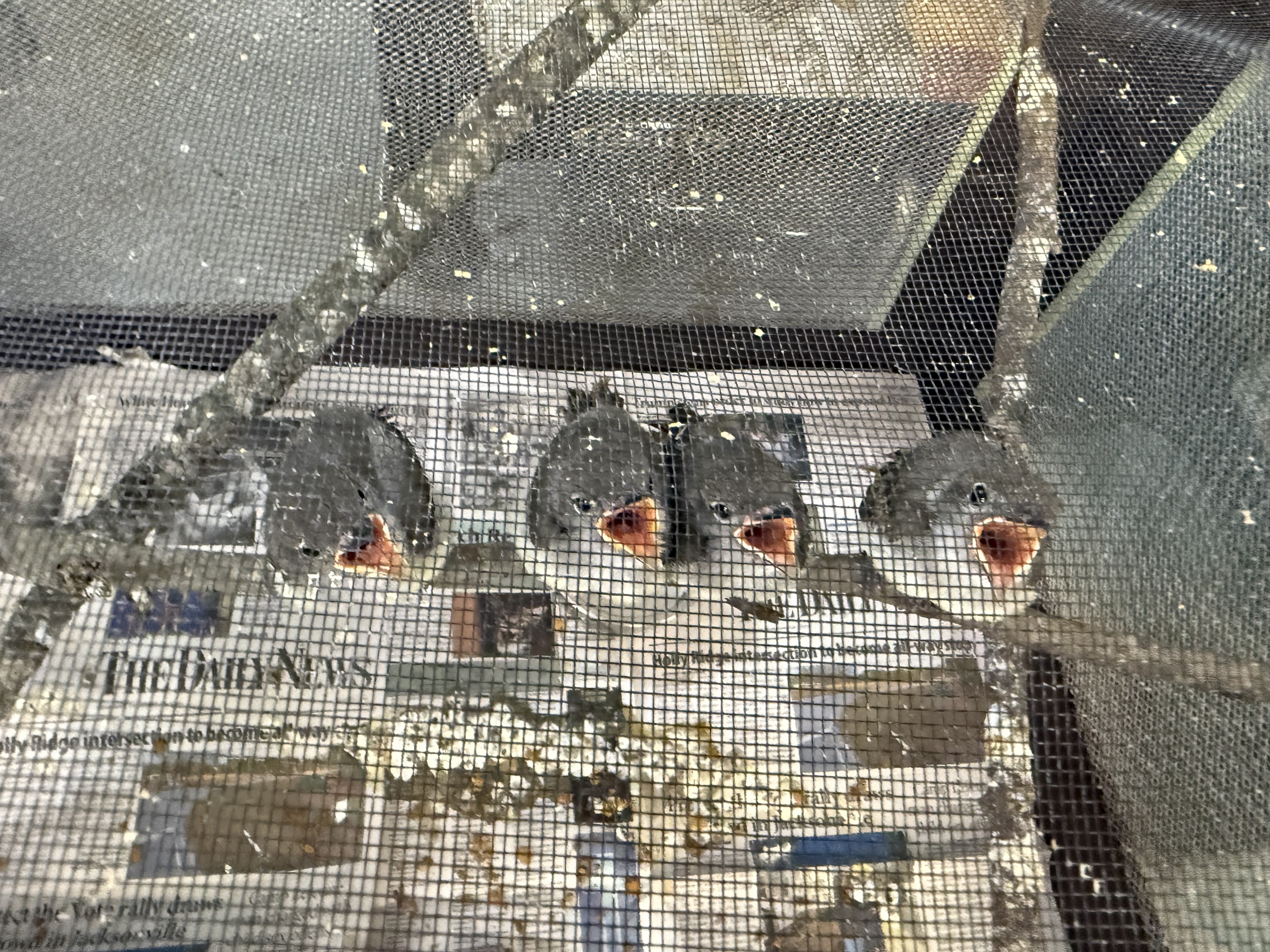
Juvenile Great Crested Flycatchers calling to be fed by rehabber.

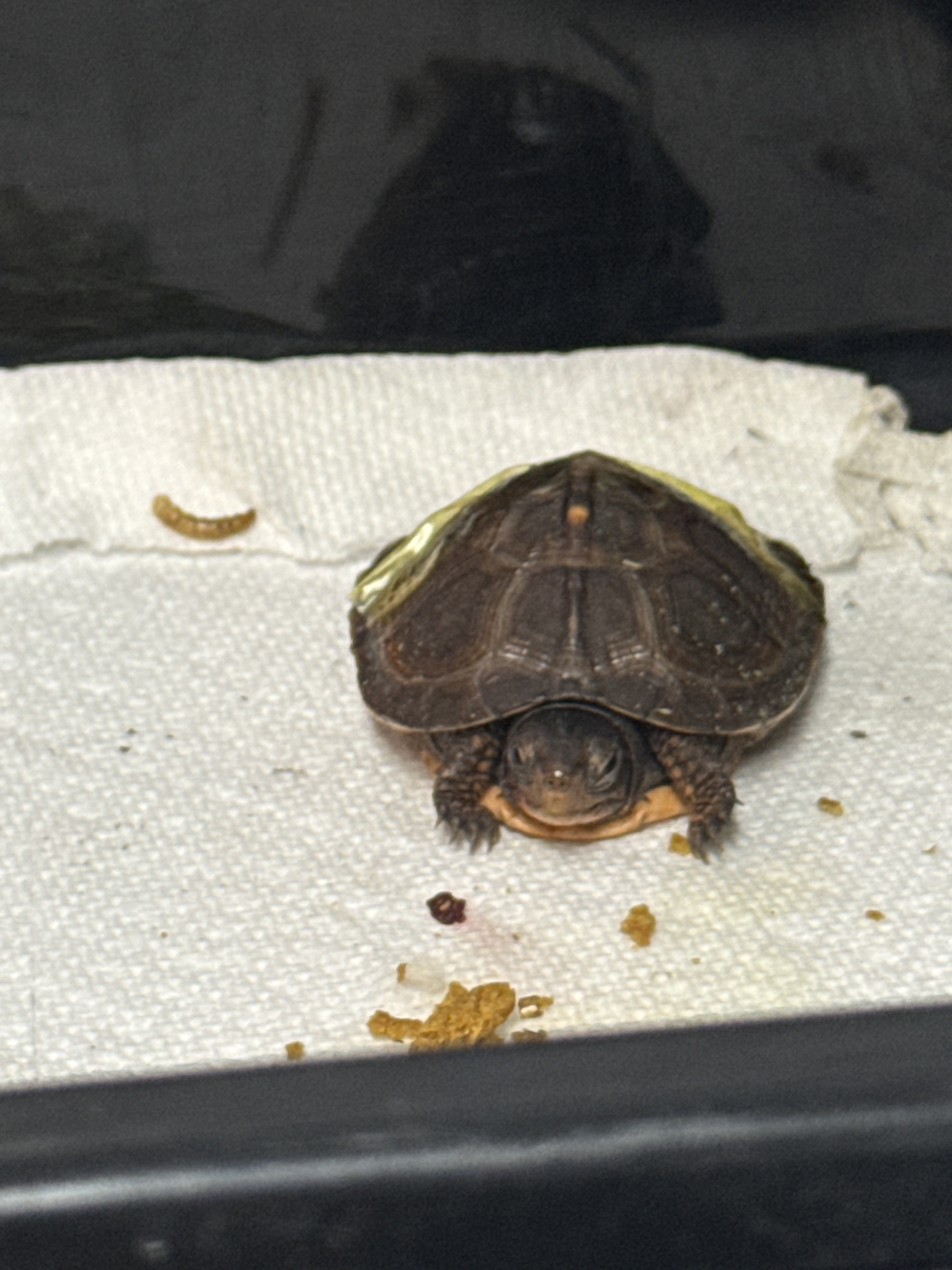
Young Box Turtle in designated container after being admitted and treated for a wound caused by a chainsaw.

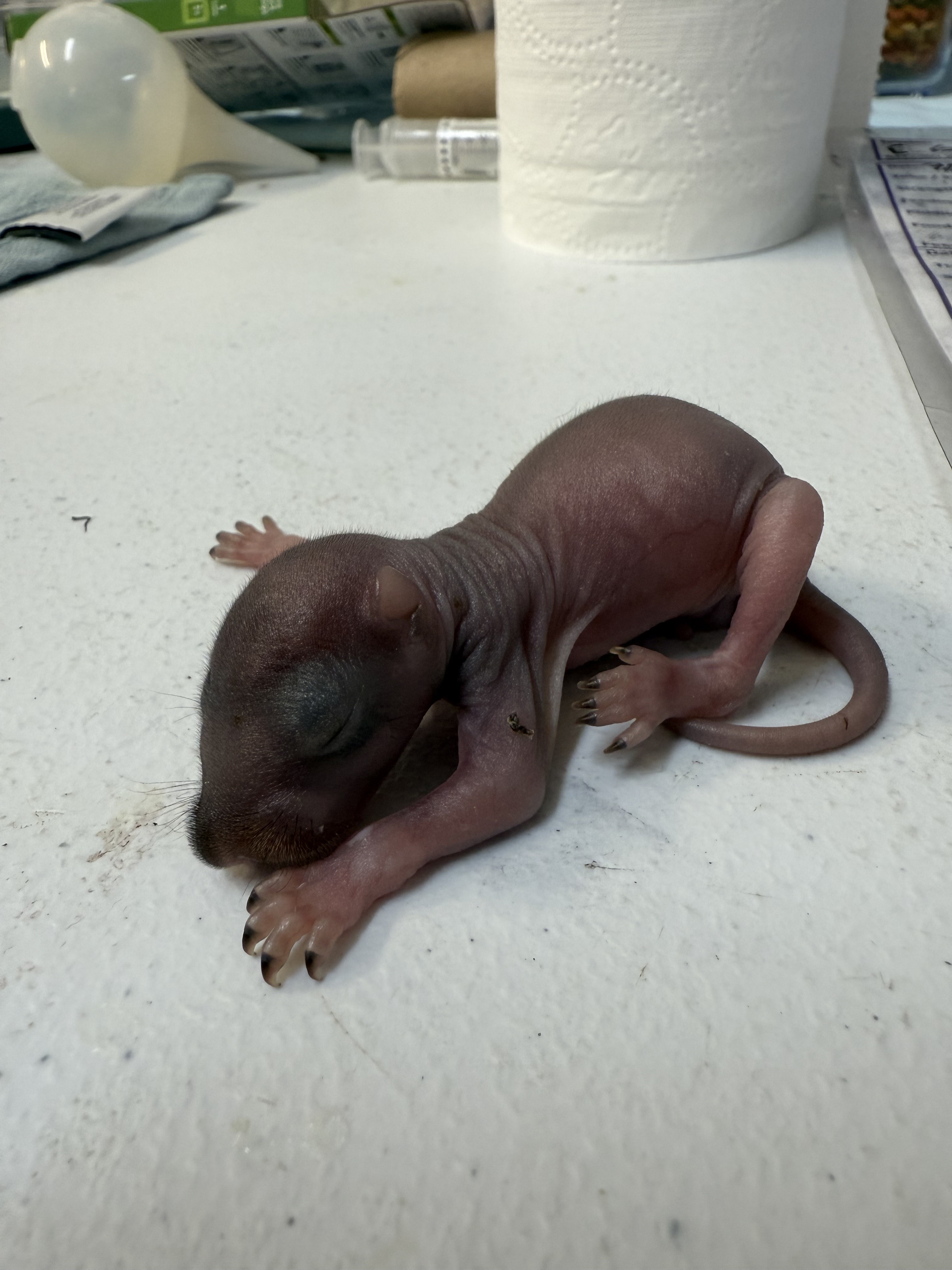
Baby Grey Squirrel laying on table at rehabilitation facility waiting to be syringe-fed along with siblings.

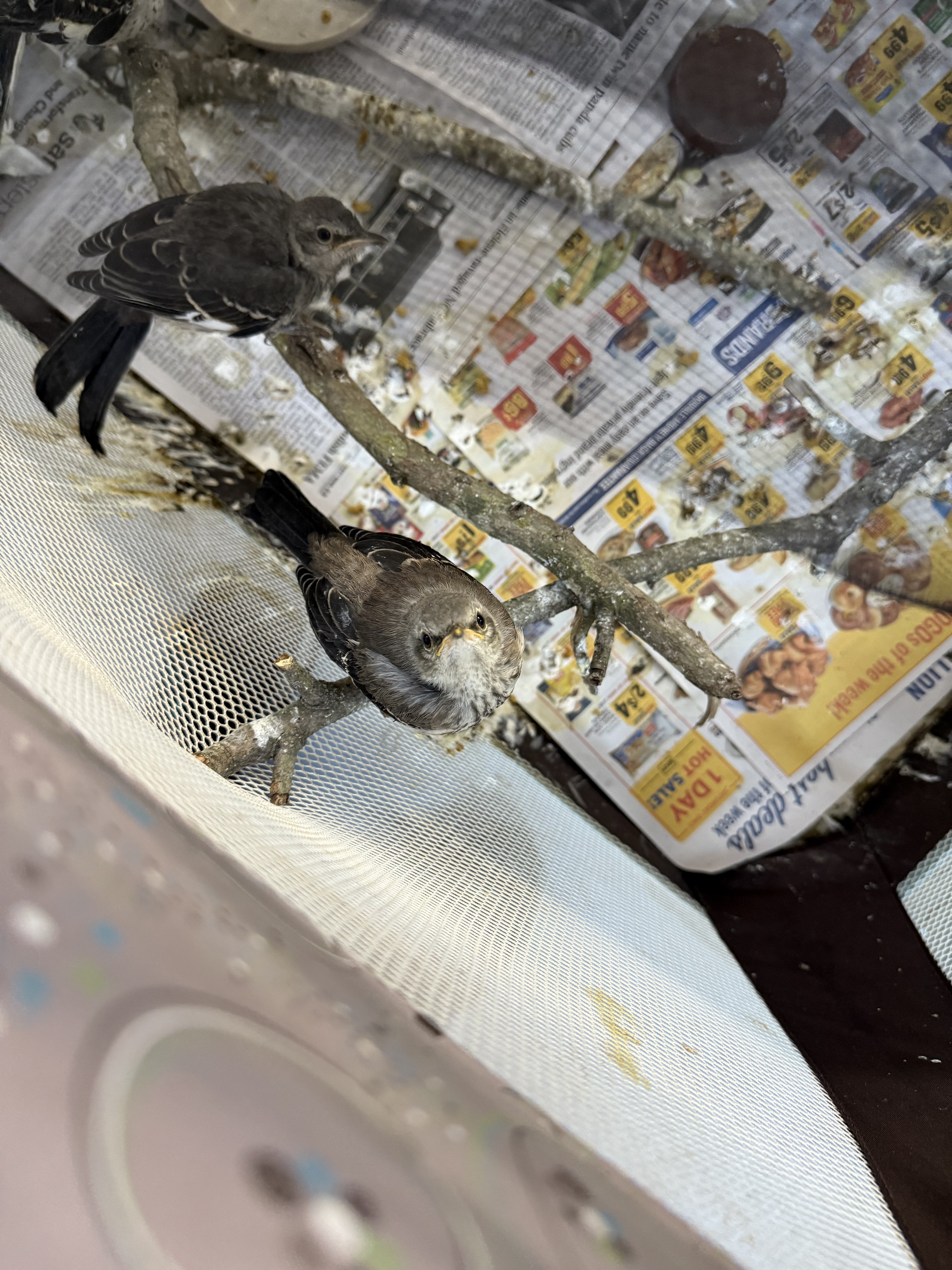
Northern Mockingbird waiting to be fed during interval feeding time while in recovery from a broken leg with other orphaned mockingbirds.
