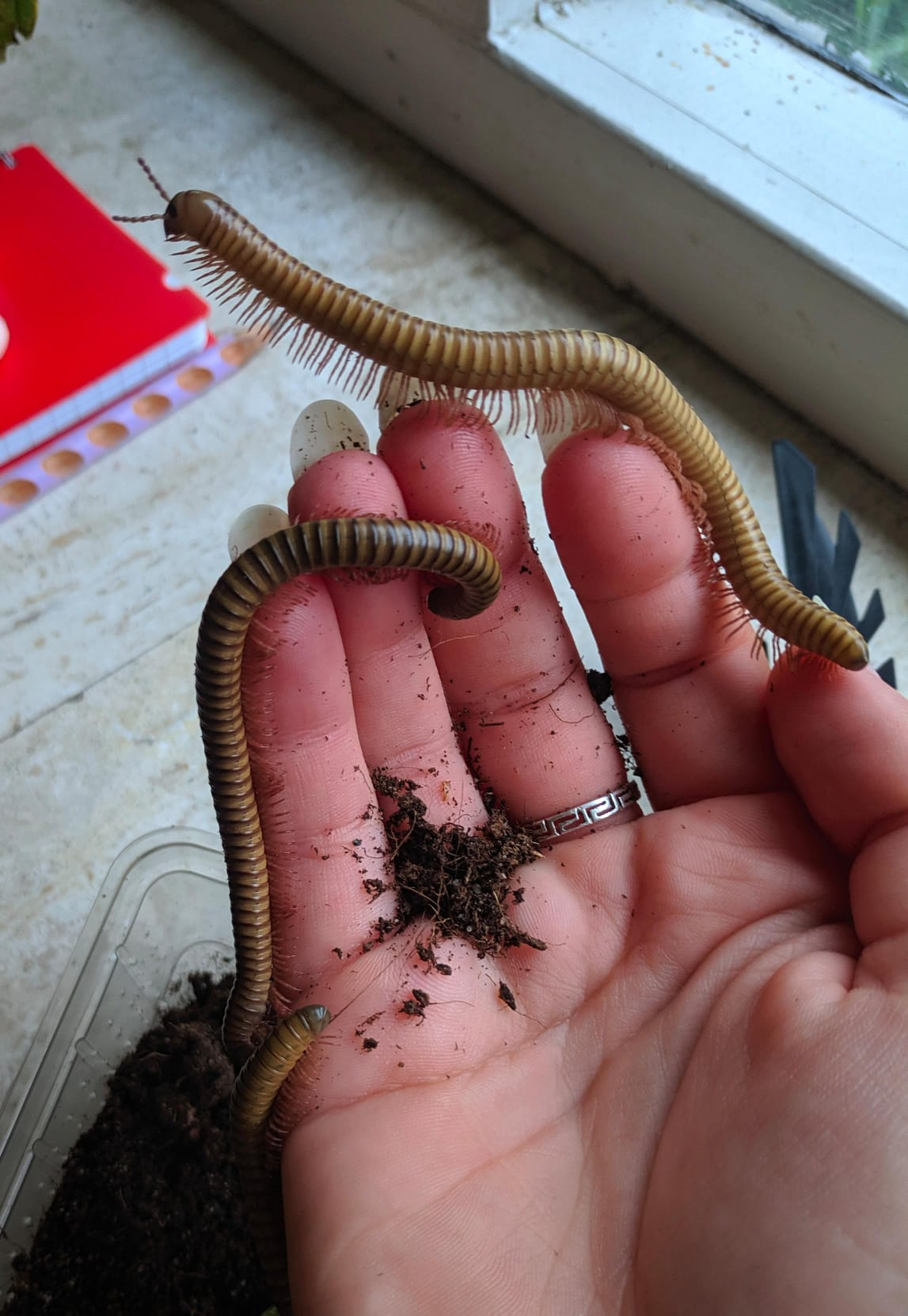

Scientific classification
- Kingdom: Animalia
- Phylum: Arthropoda
- Subphylum: Myriapoda
- Class: Diplopoda
- Order: Spirostreptida
- Family: Spirostreptidae
- Genus: Analocostreptus
- Species: A. gregorius

Binomial name
- Analocostreptus gregorius Attems, 1914

Synonyms
- Spirostreptus gregorius Attems, 1914

= Analocostreptus gregorius =

Species of millipede

Analocostreptus gregorius, previously called Spirostreptus gregorius and sometimes called African olive millipede is a millipede of the family Spirostreptidae. The species was first described by Carl Attems-Petzenstein in his 1914 "Afrikanische Spirostreptiden" from a specimen found in Angola. It has also been found in the Democratic Republic of the Congo.

== Names ==
Spirostreptus gregorius is the unaccepted name that was originally given by Attems. In 2023, a new study suggested moving gregorius and 32 other species from the genus Spirostreptus to the genus Analocostreptus. Spirostreptus gregorius received the new, current'y accepted name: Analocostreptus gregorius However, Spirostrepus gregorius is still a commonly used name in the trade.

The common name African olive millipede is sometimes used for the gregorius species, however it more commonly refers to a different millipede species: Telodeinopus aoutii.

== Description ==
The original description of this species is not very accurate when it comes to coloration. As Attems says in the description himself, the specimen he collected was not well preserved and thus it was difficult to accurately describe the color. In the trade they are described as fast, slender, long, thin millipedes that are olive to green in color, with darker stripes. The legs are reddish brown or orange. Adults can grow to be up to 120 mm long.

Males are about 6.6 mm wide and have 67 to 69 segments. Females are somewhat thicker at about 7.4 mm with 69 segments. Spiracles are located on either side of each segment starting from the 6th segment
