= Archispirostreptus syriacus =

Scientific classification
- Kingdom: Animalia
- Phylum: Arthropoda
- Subphylum: Myriapoda
- Class: Diplopoda
- Order: Spirostreptida
- Family: Spirostreptidae
- Genus: Archispirostreptus
- Species: A. syriacus

Binomial name
- Archispirostreptus syriacus (DeSaussure, 1859)

Synonyms
- Archispirostreptus judaicus (Attems, 1927); Archispirostreptus transmarinus Hoffman, 1965; Archispirostreptus tumuliporus judaicus (Attems, 1927); Graphidostreptus judaicus (Attems, 1926); Graphidostreptus tumuliporus judaicus Attems, 1926; Julus syriacus De Saussure, 1859; Spirostreptus christianus Karsch, 1887; Spirostreptus syriacus (DeSaussure, 1859)

Species of millipede

Archispirostreptus syriacus is a species of millipede within the family Spirostreptidae. The species is found distributed in the Middle East in countries such as Syria, Israel, Palestine, Yemen, Jordan, and Saudi Arabia, where it inhabits dry desert landscapes. The species grows to a length of 125 to 140 millimeters with a maximum body width of 8 to 10 millimeters. The coloration is dark gray to black with brown antennae and legs.
