= Orthoporus texicolens =

Scientific classification
- Kingdom: Animalia
- Phylum: Arthropoda
- Subphylum: Myriapoda
- Class: Diplopoda
- Order: Spirostreptida
- Family: Spirostreptidae
- Genus: Orthoporus
- Species: O. texicolens

Binomial name
- Orthoporus texicolens Chamberlin, 1938

Species of millipede

Orthoporus texicolens is a species of millipede in the family Spirostreptidae. It is found in Central America and North America.
