= Sechelleptus arborivagus =

Scientific classification
- Kingdom: Animalia
- Phylum: Arthropoda
- Subphylum: Myriapoda
- Class: Diplopoda
- Order: Spirostreptida
- Family: Spirostreptidae
- Genus: Sechelleptus
- Species: S. arborivagus

Binomial name
- Sechelleptus arborivagus (VandenSpiegel, Henrard & Mathys, 2021)

Species of millipede

Sechelleptus arborivagus is a species of millipede endemic to the Island of Mayotte.

It is an arboreal species, found in humid ecosystem on and around Mont Tchaourembo (also known as Mlima Tchaourembo).

Individual of the species have long legs, and between 57 and 62 body rings of widths between 7.0 and 9.0 mm. The species is as a light brown to reddish dark brown color, with the posterior margin of the body segments a dark brown.

The species is also known to secrete from a defensive gland when disturbed.
