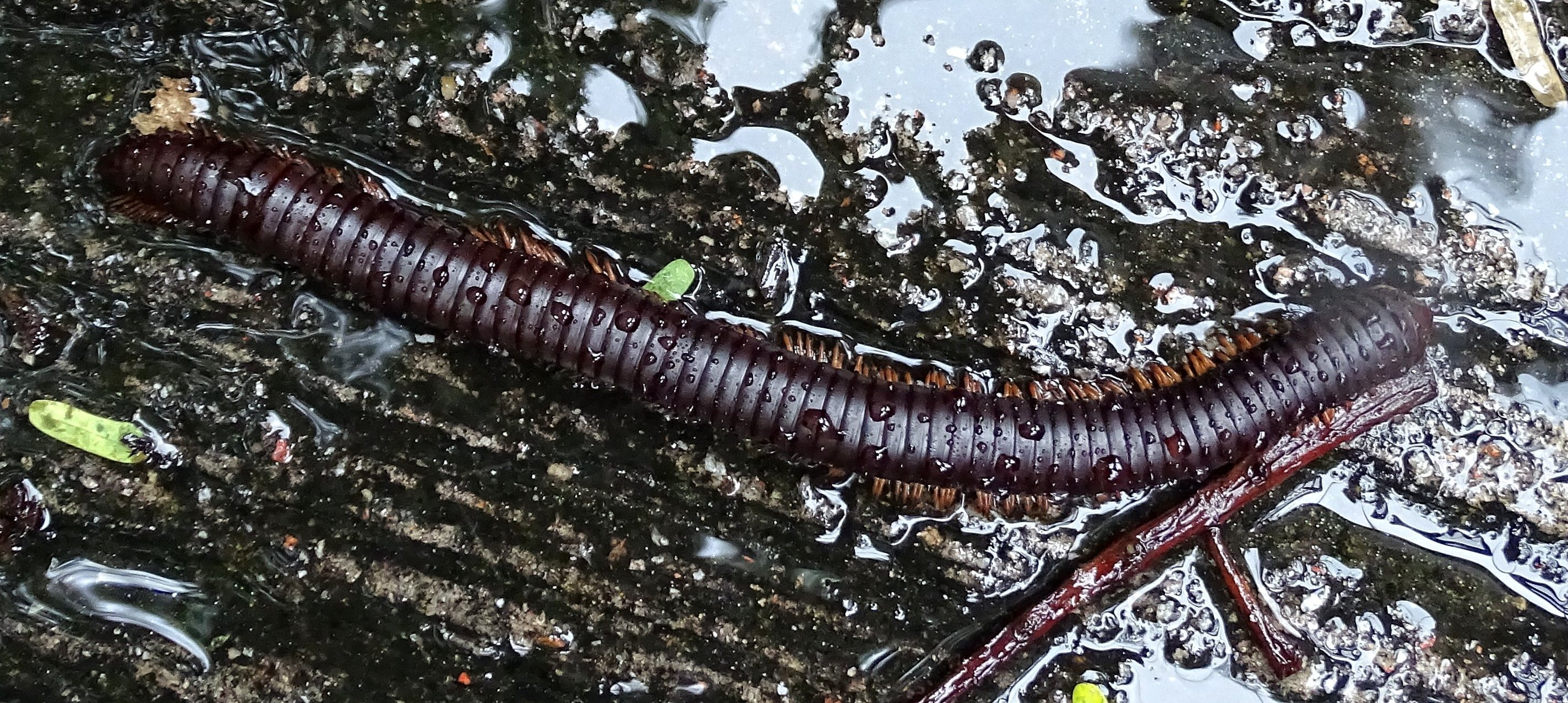

Conservation status
- Endangered (IUCN 3.1)

Scientific classification
- Kingdom: Animalia
- Phylum: Arthropoda
- Subphylum: Myriapoda
- Class: Diplopoda
- Order: Spirostreptida
- Family: Spirostreptidae
- Genus: Sechelleptus
- Species: S. seychellarum

Binomial name
- Sechelleptus seychellarum (Desjardins, 1834)

Synonyms
- Julus seychellarum; Rubanostreptus seychellarum

= Seychelles giant millipede =

Species of millipede

The Seychelles giant millipede (Sechelleptus seychellarum) is a species of millipede often over 15 cm long, endemic to 14 islands within the Seychelles, with an extent of occurrence of 600 km^{2} (230 sq mi), and occupancy area of 37 km^{2} (14 sq mi). The species has been listed as Endangered on the IUCN Red List.

The species is found to have a higher density in elevated areas with a presence of rock coverage, and uses granite rock crevices, fallen logs, and other rotting wood debris as diurnal refuges in forested habitats.

The species prefers to feed on the softer freshly fallen leaf litter of native plant species including Pisonia grandis and Ficus sp. The species is threatened by the introduction and spread of the non-native bamboo plant Bambusa vulgaris, whose presence is associated with lower population density within the species. The leaf litter of Bambusa vulgaris can dominate the leaf litter of the native flora that the species feeds on, reducing its food resources.
