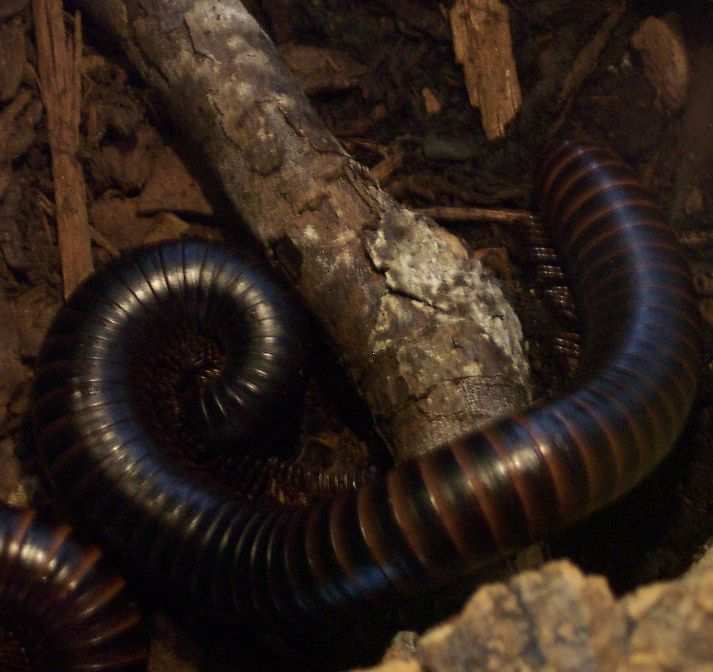
- Spirostreptus seychellarum

Scientific classification
- Domain: Eukaryota
- Kingdom: Animalia
- Phylum: Arthropoda
- Subphylum: Myriapoda
- Class: Diplopoda
- Order: Spirostreptida
- Family: Spirostreptidae
- Genus: Spirostreptus; Brandt, 1833

= Spirostreptus =

Genus of millipedes

Spirostreptus is a genus of giant millipedes of the family Spirostreptidae. It contains the following species:

- Spirostreptus abstemius Karsch, 1881
- Spirostreptus acicollis Porat
- Spirostreptus aciculatus Pocock
- Spirostreptus acutangulus (Brandt, 1841)
- Spirostreptus acutanus Karsch, 1881
- Spirostreptus acutus Humbert & Saussure, 1870
- Spirostreptus adumbratus Porath, 1872
- Spirostreptus aequalis Porath, 1872
- Spirostreptus aguaytianus Chamberlin, 1941
- Spirostreptus alligans Karsch, 1881
- Spirostreptus alticinctus Karsch, 1881
- Spirostreptus amandus Attems, 1914
- Spirostreptus amictus Karsch, 1881
- Spirostreptus amphibolius Karsch, 1881
- Spirostreptus amphobolinus Karsch
- Spirostreptus amputus Karsch, 1881
- Spirostreptus anaulax Attems, 1896
- Spirostreptus anctior Karsch, 1881
- Spirostreptus andersoni Pocock, 1889
- Spirostreptus angolanus Attems, 1934
- Spirostreptus angolensis Karsch, 1881
- Spirostreptus angulicollis Karsch, 1881
- Spirostreptus angustifrons Brölemann, 1902
- Spirostreptus annulatus Porath, 1872
- Spirostreptus antimena Saussure & Zehntner, 1901
- Spirostreptus arcanus Karsch, 1881
- Spirostreptus argus Attems, 1896
- Spirostreptus armatus Verhoeff, 1941
- Spirostreptus asthenes Pocock
- Spirostreptus astrictus Karsch 1881
- Spirostreptus atoporus Chamberlin, 1923
- Spirostreptus atratus Karsch, 1881
- Spirostreptus audouini Brandt 1833
- Spirostreptus bassleri Chamberlin, 1941
- Spirostreptus betsilea Saussure & Zehntner, 1901
- Spirostreptus bidundinus Attems, 1914
- Spirostreptus binodifer Voges, 1878
- Spirostreptus biplicatus Karsch, 1881
- Spirostreptus bisulcatus Attems, 1896
- Spirostreptus bonifatius Attems, 1914
- Spirostreptus bowringii Pocock, 1892
- Spirostreptus boyoricus Attems, 1903
- Spirostreptus brachycerus Gerstäcker, 1873
- Spirostreptus caicarae Humbert & Saussure, 1870
- Spirostreptus californicus Humbert & Saussure, 1870
- Spirostreptus cameroonensis Voges, 1878
- Spirostreptus carinatus Porat, 1894
- Spirostreptus castaneus Attems, 1934
- Spirostreptus caudiculatus Karsch, 1881
- Spirostreptus cavicollis Karsch, 1881
- Spirostreptus cephalotes Voges, 1878
- Spirostreptus chamissoi Karsch, 1881
- Spirostreptus chinchipus Chamberlin, 1941
- Spirostreptus chirographus Karsch, 1881
- Spirostreptus christianus Karsch, 1881
- Spirostreptus cinctatus Newport
- Spirostreptus cinctus Humbert & Saussure, 1870
- Spirostreptus civilis Gerstaecker, 1873
- Spirostreptus clathratus Voges, 1878
- Spirostreptus clavatus Voges, 1878
- Spirostreptus clavipes C. L. Koch, 1847
- Spirostreptus cluniculus Humbert & Saussure, 1870
- Spirostreptus coalitus Attems, 1903
- Spirostreptus coarctatus Porath, 1872
- Spirostreptus collectivus Attems, 1903
- Spirostreptus confusus Chamberlin, 1941
- Spirostreptus coniferus Attems, 1903
- Spirostreptus consobrinus Humbert & Saussure, 1870
- Spirostreptus constrictus Karsch, 1881
- Spirostreptus contayanus Chamberlin, 1941
- Spirostreptus contemptus Karsch, 1881
- Spirostreptus convolutus Saussure & Zehntner, 1901
- Spirostreptus coriaceus Saussure & Zehntner, 1901
- Spirostreptus cornutus Attems, 1934
- Spirostreptus corticosus Porat, 1888
- Spirostreptus coruscus Karsch, 1881
- Spirostreptus corvinus L. Koch, 1865
- Spirostreptus costatus Voges, 1878
- Spirostreptus crassanus Karsch, 1881
- Spirostreptus crassicornis Humbert & Saussure, 1870
- Spirostreptus cristulatus Porath, 1872
- Spirostreptus cultratus Humbert & Saussure, 1870
- Spirostreptus curiosus (Silvestri, 1895)
- Spirostreptus cutipes Porath, 1872
- Spirostreptus cycnodes Karsch, 1881
- Spirostreptus damasus Attems, 1953
- Spirostreptus dartevellei (Attems, 1953)
- Spirostreptus dentiger Attems, 1953
- Spirostreptus dimidiatus Peters, 1855
- Spirostreptus doriae Pocock
- Spirostreptus dorsolineatus Sinclair
- Spirostreptus dorsostriatus Brölemann, 1901
- Spirostreptus dulitianus Pocock, 1892
- Spirostreptus ehlersi (Silvestri, 1898)
- Spirostreptus epelus Chamberlin, 1941
- Spirostreptus erythropareius Brandt, 1841
- Spirostreptus erythropleurus Pocock, 1894
- Spirostreptus everetti Pocock, 1892
- Spirostreptus everettii Pocock, 1892
- Spirostreptus excavatus Karsch, 1881
- Spirostreptus exocoeti Pocock
- Spirostreptus falcicollis Porath, 1872
- Spirostreptus falciferus Karsch, 1881
- Spirostreptus falicferus Karsch
- Spirostreptus fangaroka Saussure & Zehntner, 1901
- Spirostreptus fasciatus Newport, 1844
- Spirostreptus filum Brölemann, 1901
- Spirostreptus flavicornis Porat, 1876
- Spirostreptus flavifilis Peters, 1855
- Spirostreptus flavifrons Porath, 1872
- Spirostreptus flavofasciatus Brölemann, 1901
- Spirostreptus flavomarginatus Daday
- Spirostreptus foveatus Karsch, 1881
- Spirostreptus foveolatus Porath, 1872
- Spirostreptus fulgens Saussure & Zehntner 1902
- Spirostreptus furcata Karsch, 1881
- Spirostreptus furcatus Karsch, 1881
- Spirostreptus fuscipes Porat, 1888
- Spirostreptus galeanus Karsch, 1881
- Spirostreptus garambanus Chamberlin, 1927
- Spirostreptus geayi Brölemann, 1898
- Spirostreptus gigas Peters, 1855
- Spirostreptus glieschi Schubart, 1960
- Spirostreptus glomeratus Attems, 1934
- Spirostreptus gracilipes Newport
- Spirostreptus gracilis Daday
- Spirostreptus graeffei L. Koch, 1865
- Spirostreptus gregorius Attems, 1914
- Spirostreptus hamifer Humbert, 1865
- Spirostreptus hermosus Chamberlin, 1941
- Spirostreptus heros Porath, 1872
- Spirostreptus heterothyreus Karsch, 1881
- Spirostreptus hildebrandtianus Karsch, 1881
- Spirostreptus horridulus Karsch
- Spirostreptus horridus Karsch, 1881
- Spirostreptus hova Saussure & Zehntner, 1901
- Spirostreptus ibanda (Silvestri, 1907)
- Spirostreptus ignobilis Humbert & Saussure, 1870
- Spirostreptus iheringi Brölemann, 1901
- Spirostreptus iheringii Brölemann, 1902
- Spirostreptus immanis Attems, 1903
- Spirostreptus impressopunctatus Koch, 1867
- Spirostreptus incertelineatus (Silvestri, 1898)
- Spirostreptus inconstans Carl, 1914
- Spirostreptus indus (Linnaeus)
- Spirostreptus ineptus Kraus, 1958
- Spirostreptus inflatannulatus (Verhoeff, 1941)
- Spirostreptus informis Attems, 1938
- Spirostreptus insculptus Pocock
- Spirostreptus integer Karsch, 1884
- Spirostreptus interruptus Brölemann, 1902
- Spirostreptus intricatus Voges, 1878
- Spirostreptus jerdani Pocock
- Spirostreptus julinus Karsch, 1881
- Spirostreptus kandyanus Humbert
- Spirostreptus laevis Voges, 1878
- Spirostreptus laticaudatus Humbert & Saussure, 1870
- Spirostreptus lemniscatus Karsch, 1881
- Spirostreptus lepturus Silvestri
- Spirostreptus leucocephalus Chamberlin, 1941
- Spirostreptus limbatus Porath, 1872
- Spirostreptus lugubris Brölemann, 1901
- Spirostreptus lunelii Humbert, 1866
- Spirostreptus macracanthus Attems, 1914
- Spirostreptus macrotis Gerstäcker, 1873
- Spirostreptus macrourus Humbert & Saussure, 1870
- Spirostreptus maculatus Karsch, 1881
- Spirostreptus makarius Attems, 1914
- Spirostreptus malabaricus Gervais
- Spirostreptus manyemanus Attems, 1927
- Spirostreptus marginatus Porath, 1872
- Spirostreptus marginescaber Karsch, 1884
- Spirostreptus maritimus Koch, 1867
- Spirostreptus marus Karsch, 1881
- Spirostreptus mathematicus Karsch, 1881
- Spirostreptus medjensis Chamberlin, 1927
- Spirostreptus meinerti Porath, 1872
- Spirostreptus melanopus Porath, 1872
- Spirostreptus mellitus Karsch, 1881
- Spirostreptus mentaveinsis Silvestri
- Spirostreptus meracus Karsch, 1881
- Spirostreptus micromelas Saussure & Zehntner, 1902
- Spirostreptus micus Karsch, 1881
- Spirostreptus mitellatus Karsch, 1881
- Spirostreptus modestus Humbert
- Spirostreptus molleri Verhoeff, 1892
- Spirostreptus montanus Attems, 1909
- Spirostreptus montivagus Karsch, 1881
- Spirostreptus moseleyi Pocock
- Spirostreptus msalaensis Kraus, 1958
- Spirostreptus multiplicatus Karsch, 1879
- Spirostreptus multisulcatus Demange, 1957
- Spirostreptus nattereri Humbert & Saussure, 1870
- Spirostreptus nebularius Kraus, 1958
- Spirostreptus nigrolabiatus Newport, 1844
- Spirostreptus notatus Porath, 1872
- Spirostreptus nutans C. L. Koch, 1847
- Spirostreptus oatesi Pocock, 1893
- Spirostreptus opistheurys Attems, 1902
- Spirostreptus orellanus Chamberlin, 1941
- Spirostreptus ornatus Peters, 1855
- Spirostreptus pachyurus Pocock, 1894
- Spirostreptus pancratius Attems, 1914
- Spirostreptus paraensis Humbert & Saussure, 1870
- Spirostreptus pardalis Gerstäcker, 1873
- Spirostreptus patruelis Porat, 1888
- Spirostreptus perakensis Pocock
- Spirostreptus perfidelis (Schubart, 1944)
- Spirostreptus perfidus Brölemann, 1902
- Spirostreptus perlucens Brölemann, 1902
- Spirostreptus phthisicus Saussure & Zehntner, 1902
- Spirostreptus pictus Karsch, 1879
- Spirostreptus plananus Karsch, 1881
- Spirostreptus plicaticollis Karsch, 1881
- Spirostreptus plicatulatus Karsch, 1881
- Spirostreptus plumaceus Voges, 1878
- Spirostreptus politus Daday
- Spirostreptus ponderosus Karsch, 1881
- Spirostreptus praetextus Porat, 1872
- Spirostreptus pratextus Porath, 1872
- Spirostreptus princeps Brölemann, 1902
- Spirostreptus procerus Attems, 1934
- Spirostreptus procerus Gerstäcker, 1873
- Spirostreptus pseudofuscipes Brölemann, 1903
- Spirostreptus puncticaudus Porath, 1872
- Spirostreptus punctilabrum Newport
- Spirostreptus punctulatus Karsch, 1881
- Spirostreptus pygidialis Schubart, 1944
- Spirostreptus pyrocephalus L. Koch, 1865
- Spirostreptus pyrrhozonus Gerstaecker, 1873
- Spirostreptus regis Pocock
- Spirostreptus repandus Karsch, 1881
- Spirostreptus rolini (Silvestri, 1897)
- Spirostreptus rostratus Voges, 1878
- Spirostreptus rotundanus Karsch, 1881
- Spirostreptus rubripes Sinclair
- Spirostreptus rugifer Voges, 1878
- Spirostreptus ruralis Carl, 1914
- Spirostreptus rusticus (Attems, 1950)
- Spirostreptus rutilans Voges, 1878
- Spirostreptus sakalava Saussure & Zehntner, 1902
- Spirostreptus sanctus (Silvestri, 1897)
- Spirostreptus sanguineus Koch
- Spirostreptus scaliger Gerstaecker, 1873
- Spirostreptus sculptus Saussure & Zehntner, 1902
- Spirostreptus sebae Brandt, 1833
- Spirostreptus sebastianus Brölemann, 1902
- Spirostreptus segmentatus Voges, 1878
- Spirostreptus selenoderus O. F. Cook
- Spirostreptus semicinctus Brölemann, 1902
- Spirostreptus semicylindricus Voges, 1878
- Spirostreptus semiglobosus Voges 1878
- Spirostreptus semilunaris Peters, 1855
- Spirostreptus sepia Brölemann, 1896
- Spirostreptus servatius Attems, 1914
- Spirostreptus setosus Voges, 1878
- Spirostreptus sicarius Attems, 1934
- Spirostreptus sinuaticollis Porat, 1894
- Spirostreptus solitarius Carl, 1909
- Spirostreptus specificus Karsch, 1881
- Spirostreptus spirobolinus Karsch, 1881
- Spirostreptus splendidus Attems, 1950
- Spirostreptus stenorhynchus Pocock, 1893
- Spirostreptus strangulatus Humbert & Saussure, 1870
- Spirostreptus striatus Hutton
- Spirostreptus strongylopygus Attems, 1950
- Spirostreptus stuhlmanni Attems, 1896
- Spirostreptus stylifer Peters, 1855
- Spirostreptus suavis Gerstäcker, 1873
- Spirostreptus subpartitus Karsch 1881
- Spirostreptus subsericeus Brölemann, 1902
- Spirostreptus sugillatus Gerstäcker, 1873
- Spirostreptus sulcanus Karsch, 1881
- Spirostreptus sulcicollis Koch
- Spirostreptus syriacus (Saussure, 1859)
- Spirostreptus teres Humbert & Saussure, 1870
- Spirostreptus tetricus Attems, 1934
- Spirostreptus thalpogenitus Karsch, 1881
- Spirostreptus tiburtius Attems, 1953
- Spirostreptus torquatus Porat
- Spirostreptus triangulicollis Attems, 1934
- Spirostreptus trichogonus Attems, 1934
- Spirostreptus triculcatus Koch
- Spirostreptus trilineatus Daday
- Spirostreptus tripartitus Cook & Collins, 1893
- Spirostreptus tristis Porat, 1888
- Spirostreptus trunculatus Karsch, 1881
- Spirostreptus tschudii Karsch, 1881
- Spirostreptus tumidens Karsch, 1881
- Spirostreptus tumuliporus Karsch, 1881
- Spirostreptus typotopyge Brölemann, 1905
- Spirostreptus ucayalus Chamberlin, 1941
- Spirostreptus unicolor Daday
- Spirostreptus ventralis Porat, 1876
- Spirostreptus vermiculus Saussure & Zehntner, 1902
- Spirostreptus versicolor Saussure & Zehntner, 1902
- Spirostreptus vittatus Newport, 1844
- Spirostreptus voeltzkowi Attems, 1910
- Spirostreptus vulgatus Porat, 1888
- Spirostreptus wahlbergi Porath, 1872
- Spirostreptus woodi Humbert & Saussure, 1870
- Spirostreptus xanthodactylus Gerstaecker, 1873
- Spirostreptus xanthopus Saussure & Zehntner, 1901
- Spirostreptus yambatanus Attems, 1934
