= Chamberlineptus =

Scientific classification
- Kingdom: Animalia
- Phylum: Arthropoda
- Subphylum: Myriapoda
- Class: Diplopoda
- Order: Spirostreptida
- Family: Spirostreptidae
- Genus: Chamberlineptus; Causey, 1954
- Species: C. morechalensis

Binomial name
- Chamberlineptus morechalensis Causey, 1954

Genus of millipedes

Chamberlineptus morechalensis, the sole species of the genus Chamberlineptus is a spirostreptid millipede from Venezuela. Individuals are around 10 cm (3.9 in) long and 5.4 to 7 mm (0.21 to 0.28 in) in diameter. C. morechalensis was described in 1954 by Nell B. Causey, described as similar to the spirostreptid Andineptus in the structure of the gonopods (male reproductive appendages). However, J. M. Demange (1970) and Jean-Paul Mauriès (1975) considered both Chamberlineptus and Andineptus to be taxonomic synonyms, or at least subgenera, of Orthoporus.
