= Spirostreptus modestus =

Scientific classification
- Kingdom: Animalia
- Phylum: Arthropoda
- Subphylum: Myriapoda
- Class: Diplopoda
- Order: Spirostreptida
- Family: Spirostreptidae
- Genus: Spirostreptus
- Species: S. modestus

Binomial name
- Spirostreptus modestus Humbert, 1866

Species of millipede

Spirostreptus modestus, is a species of round-backed millipede in the family Spirostreptidae. It is endemic to Sri Lanka.
