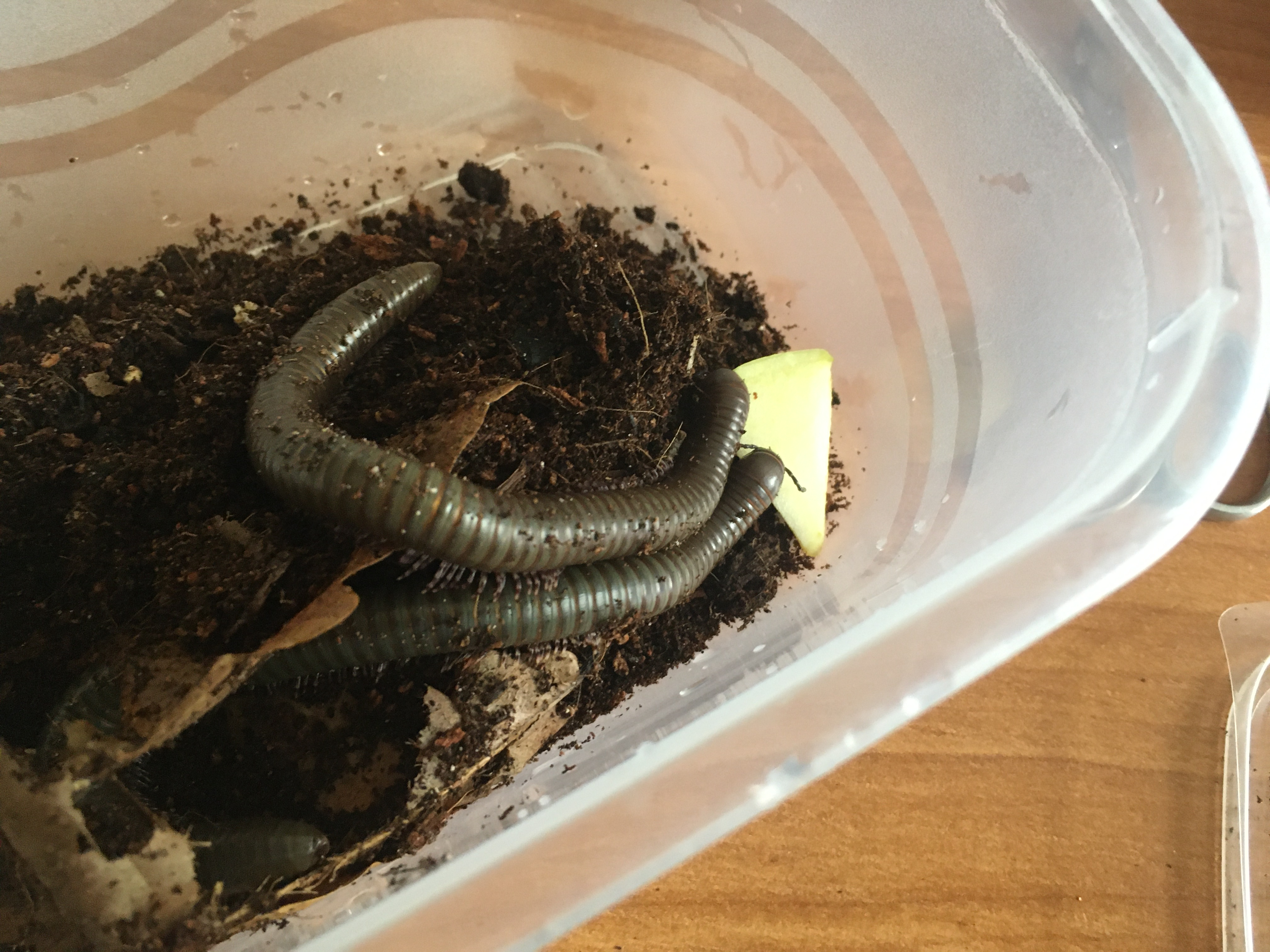

Scientific classification
- Kingdom: Animalia
- Phylum: Arthropoda
- Subphylum: Myriapoda
- Class: Diplopoda
- Order: Spirostreptida
- Family: Spirostreptidae
- Genus: Telodeinopus
- Species: T. aoutii

Binomial name
- Telodeinopus aoutii (Demange, 1971)

= Telodeinopus aoutii =

Species of millipede

Telodeinopus aoutii, commonly known as the giant African olive millipede, the Ghana speckled leg millipede, and the long legged millipede, is a species of large millipede inhabiting the tropical forests of west, central and east Africa.

T. aoutii has an oblong and cylindrical body, that is 16–18 cm (6.3–7.1 in) long when fully mature. Its segmental body structure consists of 68–73 individual segments separated by a ring with a clearly separated head which is rounded above and flattened below and bears a pair of large mandibles. The head contains a single pair of antennae with a group of sensory cones at the tip. The next segments (middle) are similar to each other. They consist of two connected rings, each equipped with two pairs of legs. The exception are the first three segments which have only one pair of legs each. Males in the fourth segment lack legs, which evolved into reproductive organ - gonopod. The last segment - the abdomen - also lacks legs. The coloration varies depending on the sex. The predominance of males is olive green, while females are brown. The feature common to both sexes is the rusty-brown color of the surface between the rings, with legs colored alternately white and brown.

== Ecology and behavior ==
Millipedes feed almost exclusively on plants or rotting organic debris. Their importance extends to ecological processes, ultimately helping to release nutrients into the soil. They feed mostly at night and avoid light. Although millipedes are generally considered beneficial to the ecosystem, they sometimes cause agricultural damage. Telodeinopus aoutii has been recognised as a pest of wheat and barley crops in Ethiopia.

When threatened, they have at least two defense mechanisms. The first involves twisting the body "snail-like" and exposing the side covered with armor to the outside. The second involves the secretion of an irritating substance from glands located on the sides of the middle segments.
