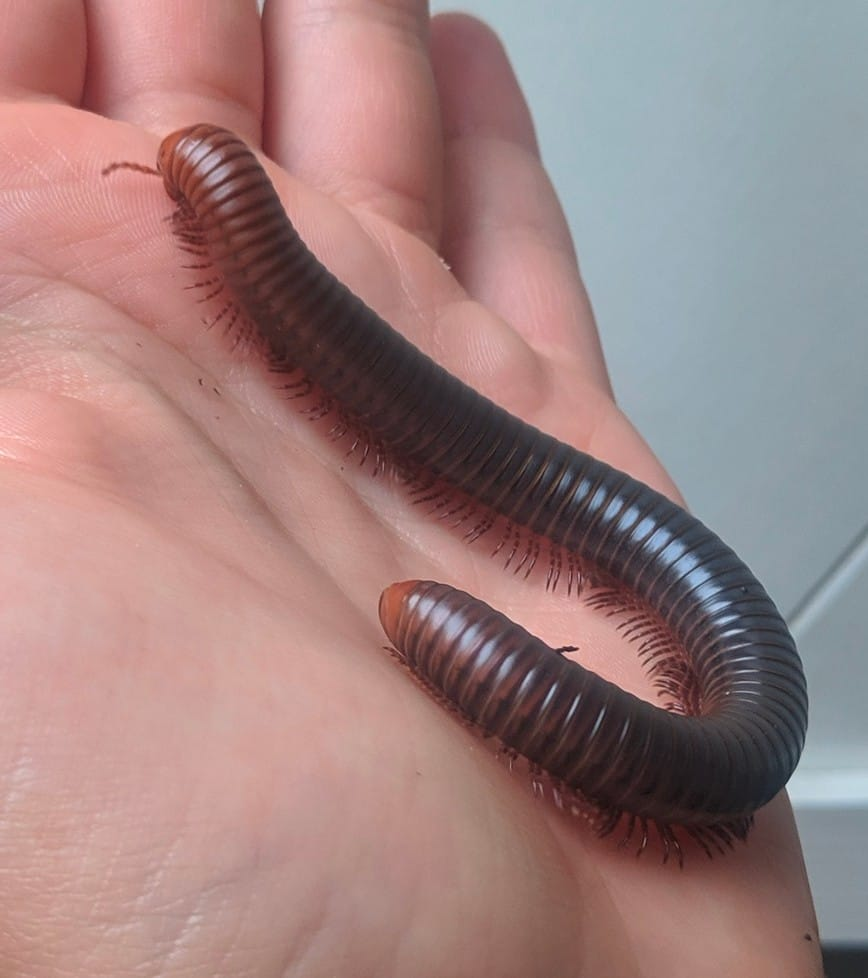

Scientific classification
- Kingdom: Animalia
- Phylum: Arthropoda
- Subphylum: Myriapoda
- Class: Diplopoda
- Order: Spirostreptida
- Family: Spirostreptidae
- Genus: Analocostreptus
- Species: A. servatius

Binomial name
- Analocostreptus servatius (Attems, 1914)

Synonyms
- Spirostreptus servatius Attems, 1914; Spirostreptus serratus Attems, 1914

= Analocostreptus servatius =

Species of millipede

Analocostreptus servatius, the firehead-millipede, is a millipede of the family Spirostreptidae. The species was first described by Carl Attems in his 1914 Afrikanische Spirostreptiden: nebst Ueberblick über die Spirostreptiden orbis terrarum Attems, C. M. T. Graf von. (1914) as Spirostreptus servatius. It was first found in Bibundi, Cameroon. It is distributed over west and central Africa.

== Description ==
The body of the millipede is a very dark warm brown with lighter orange brown towards the head and the end. the antennae and legs are also lighter colored. The adults are about 20 cm (7.9 in) long, sometimes reaching 25 or 26 cm (9.8 or 10.2 in). Males are often somewhat duller in coloration and have a thicker seventh segment, where the gonads replace one pair of the legs.

== Biology ==
In captivity, the species is known to live for five to ten years. In the wild they live in moist, shady forests, with temperatures around 25 to 28 °C (77 to 82 °F) and humidity between 70% and 80%. They feed on organic matter like rotting leaves and wood, lichens, and fruits and vegetables.

== Taxonomy ==
Analocostreptus was first placed in the family Spirostreptus but in 2023 a new study suggested to classify them in the genus Analocostreptus which caused it to be renamed to Analocostreptus servatius.
