= Sechelleptus variabilis =

Scientific classification
- Kingdom: Animalia
- Phylum: Arthropoda
- Subphylum: Myriapoda
- Class: Diplopoda
- Order: Spirostreptida
- Family: Spirostreptidae
- Genus: Sechelleptus
- Species: S. variabilis

Binomial name
- Sechelleptus variabilis VandenSpiegel & Golovatch, 2007

Species of millipede

Sechelleptus variabilis is a species of millipede endemic to the island nation of Comoros, where it is found on the islands of Mohéli, Anjouan and Mayotte.

The species holotype was collected in May 2003 on the island of Mohéli.

Individuals of the species have between 50 and 60 body rings, and a width at the mid-body of 3.0 to 5.0 mm. The length of adults of the species varies, with individuals measuring between 2.5 cm and 8 cm in length having been collected.
