= Calathostreptus =

Scientific classification
- Kingdom: Animalia
- Phylum: Arthropoda
- Subphylum: Myriapoda
- Class: Diplopoda
- Order: Spirostreptida
- Family: Spirostreptidae
- Subfamily: Spirostreptinae
- Tribe: Spirostreptini
- Genus: Calathostreptus; Schubart, 1959

Type species
- Calathostreptus fluminensis Schubart, 1959

Genus of millipedes

Calathostreptus is a genus of millipedes belonging to the family Spirostreptidae. It contains the following species:

- Calathostreptus fluminensis
- Calathostreptus fulvus
