= Calostreptus =

Scientific classification
- Kingdom: Animalia
- Phylum: Arthropoda
- Subphylum: Myriapoda
- Class: Diplopoda
- Order: Spirostreptida
- Family: Spirostreptidae
- Tribe: Trachystreptini
- Genus: Calostreptus; Cook, 1896

Type species
- Calostreptus chelys Cook, 1896

Genus of millipedes

Calostreptus is a genus of giant African millipedes in family Spirostreptidae, containing three species:

- Calostreptus carinatus Attems, 1928
- Calostreptus chelys Cook, 1896
- Calostreptus cooki Kraus, 1958
