= Charactopygus =

Scientific classification
- Kingdom: Animalia
- Phylum: Arthropoda
- Subphylum: Myriapoda
- Class: Diplopoda
- Order: Spirostreptida
- Family: Spirostreptidae
- Subfamily: Spirostreptinae
- Tribe: Spirostreptini
- Genus: Charactopygus; De Saussure & Zehntner, 1902

Type species
- Charactopygus atratus Karsch, 1881

Species
- Charactopygus atratus; Charactopygus betsilea; Charactopygus radamae; Charactopygus sakalava; Charactopygus trilobatus; Charactopygus voeltzkowi

Genus of millipedes

Charactopygus is a genus of millipedes in the family Spirostreptidae. They are found in East Africa and Madagascar.

== Taxonomy ==
The genus Charactopygus contains the following species:

- Charactopygus atratus
- Charactopygus betsilea
- Charactopygus radamae
- Charactopygus sakalava
- Charactopygus trilobatus
- Charactopygus voeltzkowi
