= Anastreptus =

Scientific classification
- Kingdom: Animalia
- Phylum: Arthropoda
- Subphylum: Myriapoda
- Class: Diplopoda
- Order: Spirostreptida
- Family: Spirostreptidae
- Tribe: Trachystreptini
- Genus: Anastreptus; Cook, 1896

Type species
- Anastreptus scalatus Karsch, 1881

Genus of millipedes

Anastreptus is a genus of giant African millipedes in family Spirostreptidae, containing five species:

- Anastreptus andreini (Brölemann, 1903)
- Anastreptus entomotropis (Chamberlin, 1927)
- Anastreptus scalatus (Karsch, 1881)
- Anastreptus strongylotropis (Attems, 1914)
- Anastreptus unidentatus (Silvestri, 1897)
