= Autostreptus =

Scientific classification
- Kingdom: Animalia
- Phylum: Arthropoda
- Subphylum: Myriapoda
- Class: Diplopoda
- Order: Spirostreptida
- Family: Spirostreptidae
- Subfamily: Spirostreptinae
- Tribe: Spirostreptini
- Genus: Autostreptus; Silvestri, 1905

Type species
- Autostreptus chilensis Gervais, 1847

Genus of millipedes

Autostreptus is a genus of millipedes in the family Spirostreptidae. It contains the following species:

- Autostreptus chilensis
- Autostreptus yanezi
