= Bandeirenica caboverda =

Scientific classification
- Kingdom: Animalia
- Phylum: Arthropoda
- Subphylum: Myriapoda
- Class: Diplopoda
- Order: Spirostreptida
- Family: Odontopygidae
- Genus: Bandeirenica
- Species: B. caboverda

Binomial name
- Bandeirenica caboverda (Pierrard, 1987)

Synonyms
- Spinotarsus caboverdus Pierrard, 1987

Species of millipede

Bandeirenica caboverda, locally known in Cape Verde as "mil-pés" (Portuguese for "thousand-feet"), is a species of millipedes of the family Odontopygidae. It is endemic to Cape Verde, where it occurs in the islands of Santo Antão and São Vicente. First described in 1987 as Spinotarsus caboverdus, it was placed in the genus Bandeirenica in 2000.

The animal is a pest on Santo Antão, where it damages food crops such as potato, sweet potato, papaya and mango. The Cape Verde government issued a prohibition on the exportation of many of the island's products to the other islands.
