= Bucinogonus =

Scientific classification
- Kingdom: Animalia
- Phylum: Arthropoda
- Subphylum: Myriapoda
- Class: Diplopoda
- Order: Spirostreptida
- Family: Spirostreptidae
- Tribe: Trachystreptini
- Genus: Bucinogonus; Demange & Mauriès, 1975

Type species
- Bucinogonus kandti Carl, 1909

Genus of millipedes

Bucinogonus is a genus of millipedes in the family Spirostreptidae. It contains the following species:

- Bucinogonus aviceps
- Bucinogonus kandti
- Bucinogonus silvestrii
