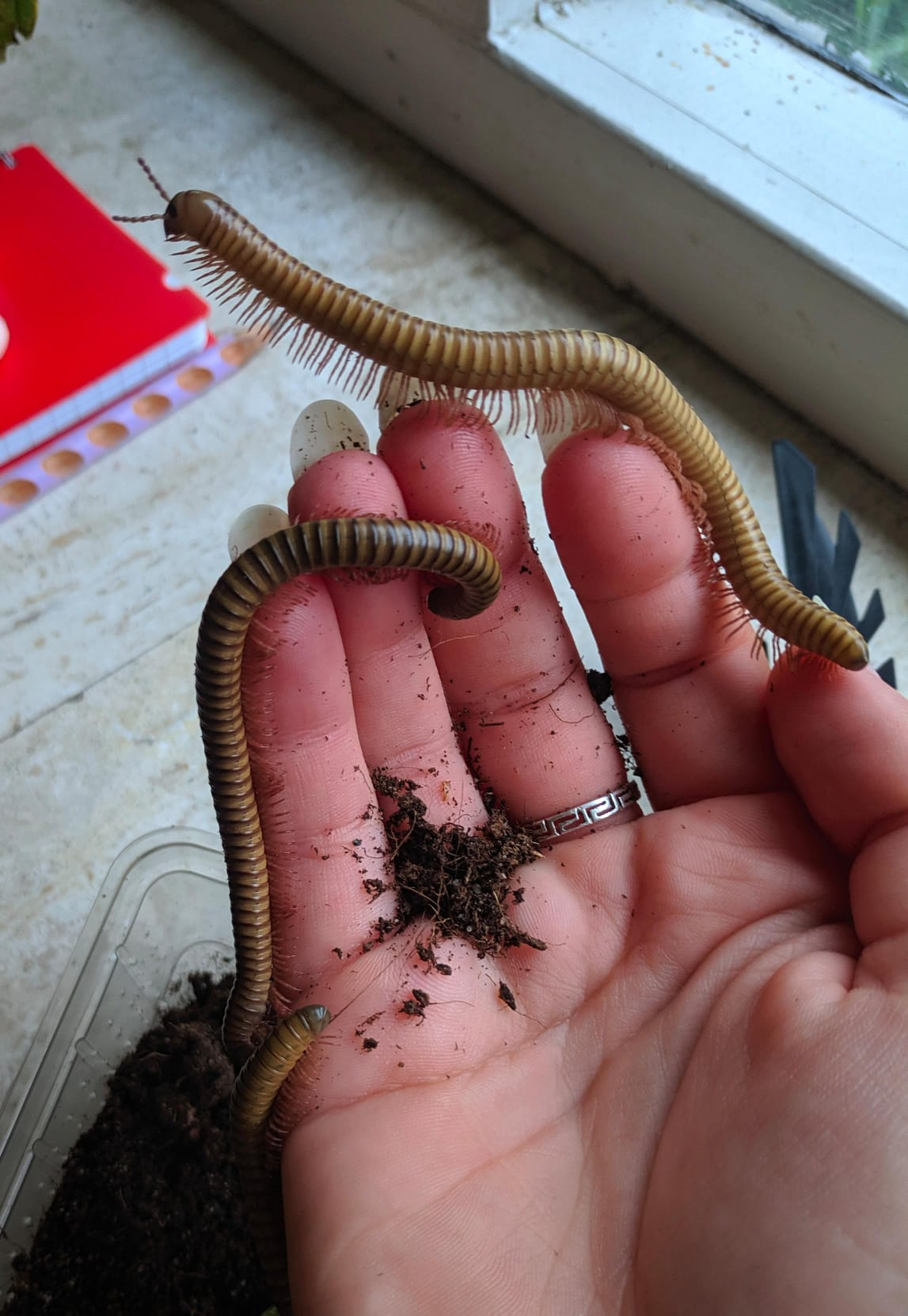
- A. gregorius

Scientific classification
- Kingdom: Animalia
- Phylum: Arthropoda
- Subphylum: Myriapoda
- Class: Diplopoda
- Order: Spirostreptida
- Family: Spirostreptidae
- Tribe: Perustreptini
- Genus: Analocostreptus; Silvestri, 1910

Type species
- Archispirostreptus ibanda Silvestri, 1907

= Analocostreptus =

Genus of millipedes

Analocostreptus is a genus of millipedes in the family Spirostreptidae. It contains the following species:

- Analocostreptus amandus
- Analocostreptus biconus
- Analocostreptus bonifatius
- Analocostreptus castaneus
- Analocostreptus cornutus
- Analocostreptus damasus
- Analocostreptus dartevellei
- Analocostreptus dentiger
- Analocostreptus garambanus
- Analocostreptus gregorius
- Analocostreptus ibanda
- Analocostreptus ineptus
- Analocostreptus informis
- Analocostreptus makarius
- Analocostreptus manyemanus
- Analocostreptus medjensis
- Analocostreptus micromelas
- Analocostreptus missionarius
- Analocostreptus montivagus
- Analocostreptus multisulcatus
- Analocostreptus pancratius
- Analocostreptus pavani
- Analocostreptus phthisicus
- Analocostreptus pictus
- Analocostreptus rolini
- Analocostreptus sculptus
- Analocostreptus semilunaris
- Analocostreptus servatius
- Analocostreptus tetricus
- Analocostreptus tiburtius
- Analocostreptus triangulicollis
- Analocostreptus versicolor
- Analocostreptus yambatanus
