= Brasilostreptus =

Scientific classification
- Kingdom: Animalia
- Phylum: Arthropoda
- Subphylum: Myriapoda
- Class: Diplopoda
- Order: Spirostreptida
- Family: Spirostreptidae
- Subfamily: Spirostreptinae
- Tribe: Spirostreptini
- Genus: Brasilostreptus; Verhoeff, 1938
- Species: B. gracilis

Binomial name
- Brasilostreptus gracilis Verhoeff, 1938

Genus of millipedes

Brasilostreptus is a genus of millipedes in the family Spirostreptidae. It contains a single species, Brasilostreptus gracilis.
