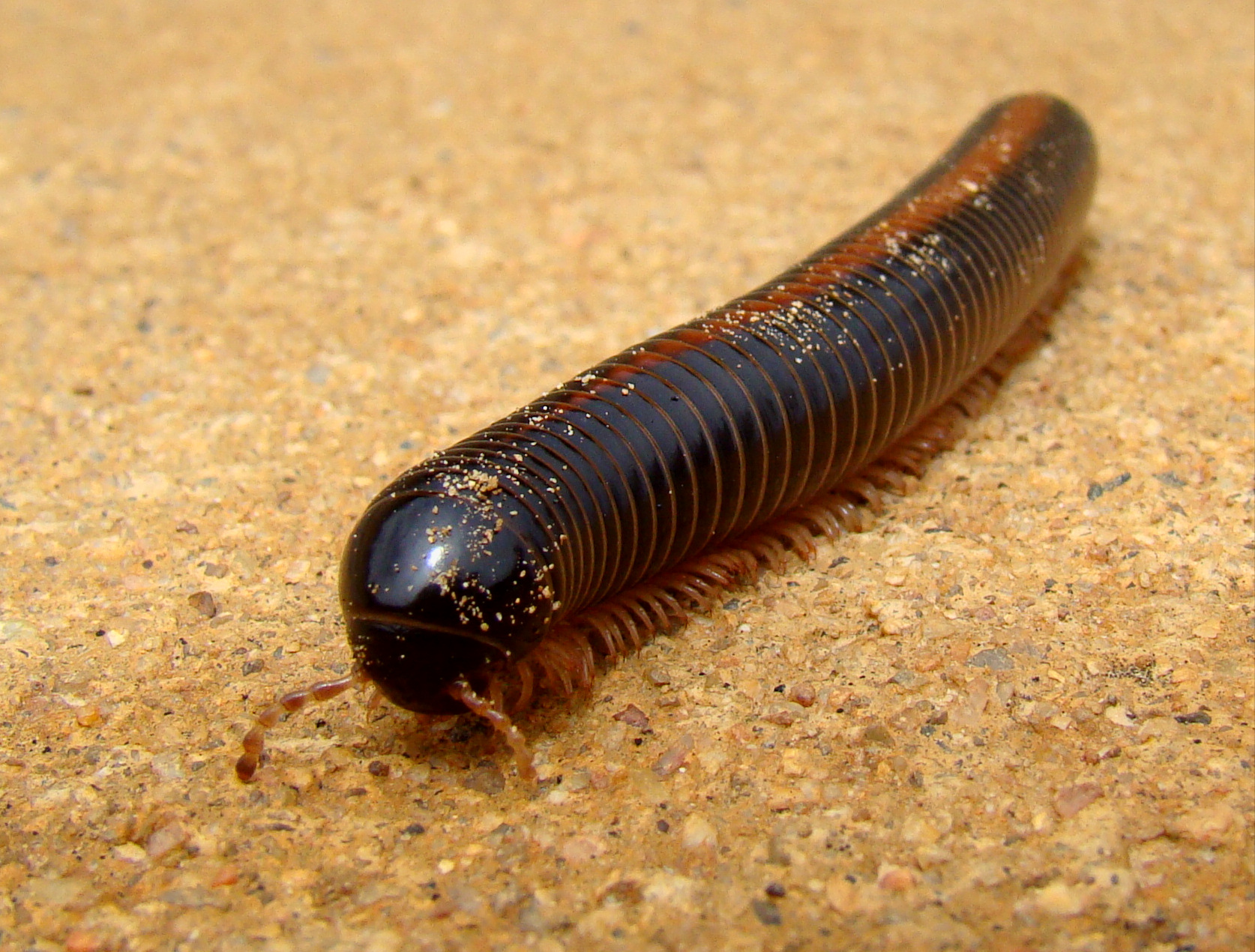

Conservation status
- Least Concern (IUCN 3.1)

Scientific classification
- Kingdom: Animalia
- Phylum: Arthropoda
- Subphylum: Myriapoda
- Class: Diplopoda
- Order: Spirostreptida
- Family: Spirostreptidae
- Genus: Archispirostreptus
- Species: A. gigas

Binomial name
- Archispirostreptus gigas (Peters, 1855)

Synonyms
- Graphidostreptus gigas Peters, 1855; Spirostreptus gigas Peters, 1855; Spirostreptus plumaceus Voges, 1878; Spirostreptus semicylindricus Voges, 1878; Spirostreptus opistheurys Attems, 1896; Aethiopistreptus attemsi Verhoeff, 1938; Spirostreptus msalaensis Kraus, 1958

= Archispirostreptus gigas =

Giant African millipede

Species of millipede

Archispirostreptus gigas, known as the giant African millipede, shongololo or Bongololo, is the largest extant species of millipede, growing up to 33.5 centimetres (13.2 in) in length, 67 millimetres (2.6 in) in circumference. It has approximately 256 legs, although the number of legs changes with each molting so it can vary according to each individual.

It is a widespread species in lowland parts of East Africa, from Mozambique to Kenya, but rarely reaches altitudes above 1,000 metres (3,300 ft). It lives mostly in forests, but can also be found in areas of coastal habitat that contain at least a few trees. It is native to Southern Arabia, especially Dhofar.

In general, giant millipedes have a life expectancy of about 7–10 years.

== Defence ==
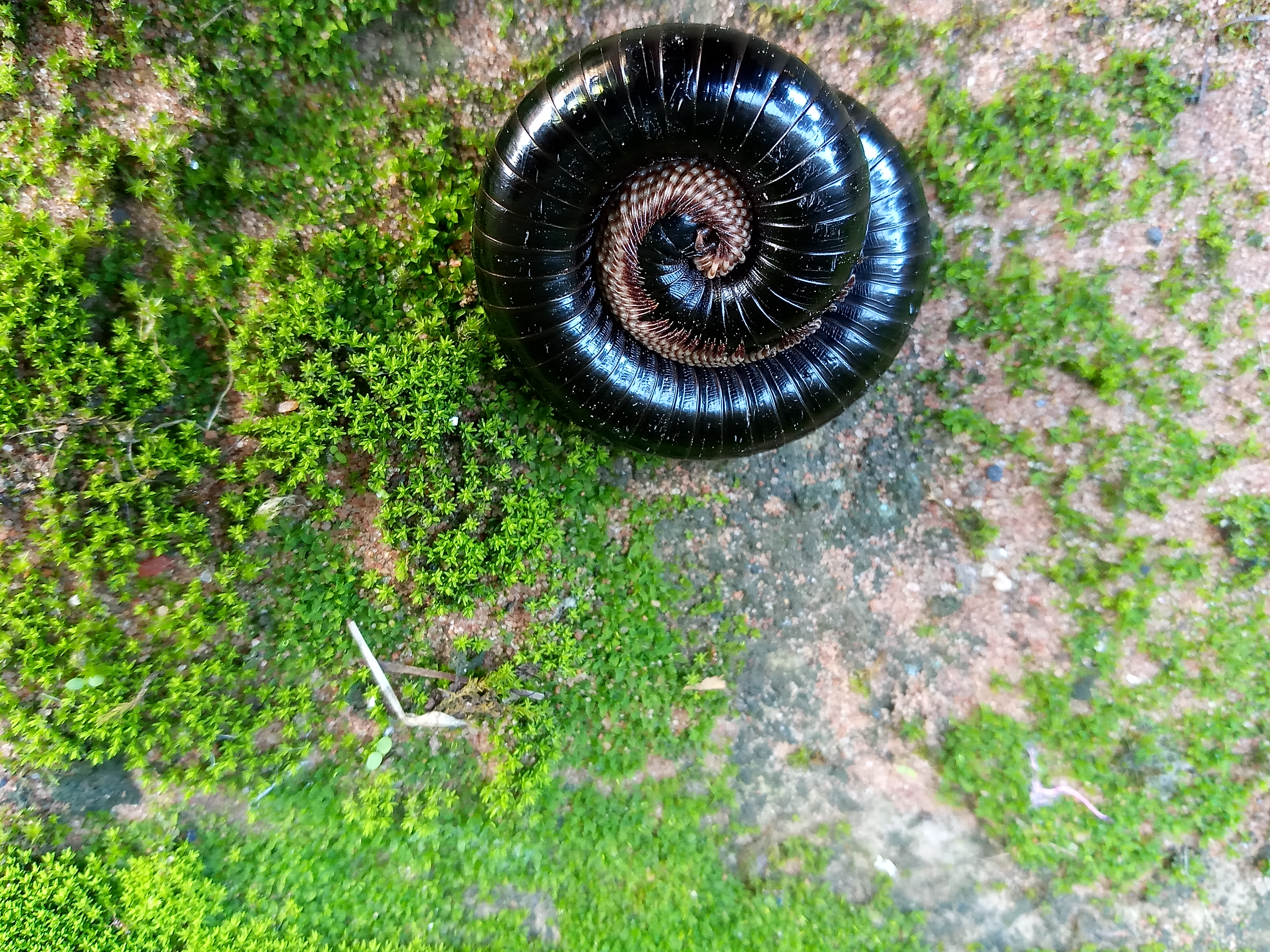
Giant millipede coiled in defence

These millipedes have two main modes of defence if they feel threatened: curling into a tight spiral and exposing only the hard exoskeleton, and secretion of an irritating liquid from pores on their body. This liquid can be harmful if introduced into the eyes or mouth. Because of this defense, A. gigas is one of the few invertebrates that driver ants are incapable of taking as prey. The chemicals identified in this millipede's defensive secretion are toluquinone and 2-methoxy-3-methylbenzoquinone.

Small mites are often observed crawling on their exoskeleton and among their legs. The millipedes have a symbiotic relationship with these mites because the mites help clean the millipede's exoskeleton in exchange for food and the protection of their host.

A docile species, A. gigas is sometimes seen in the pet trade. However, the U.S. federal government requires anyone bringing giant millipedes into the country to have permits for them.

== Ecological role ==
Archispirostreptus gigas plays an important role as a decomposer in tropical ecosystems. They help break down decaying plant material which returns nutrients to the soil and supports forest floor health. A. gigas uses hemocyanin, a copper-based protein, for oxygen transport. Recent research has shown that the giant African millipede (Archispirostreptus gigas) contributes to nutrient recycling in tropical forests through methanogenesis in its gut microbiota, which aids in the breakdown of plant matter and carbon cycling. They are also well adapted to low-oxygen environments like rotting logs and dense leaf litter, which allows them to stay active in areas where oxygen is limited. Thus, they thrive in key nutrient-cycling zones of the ecosystem.

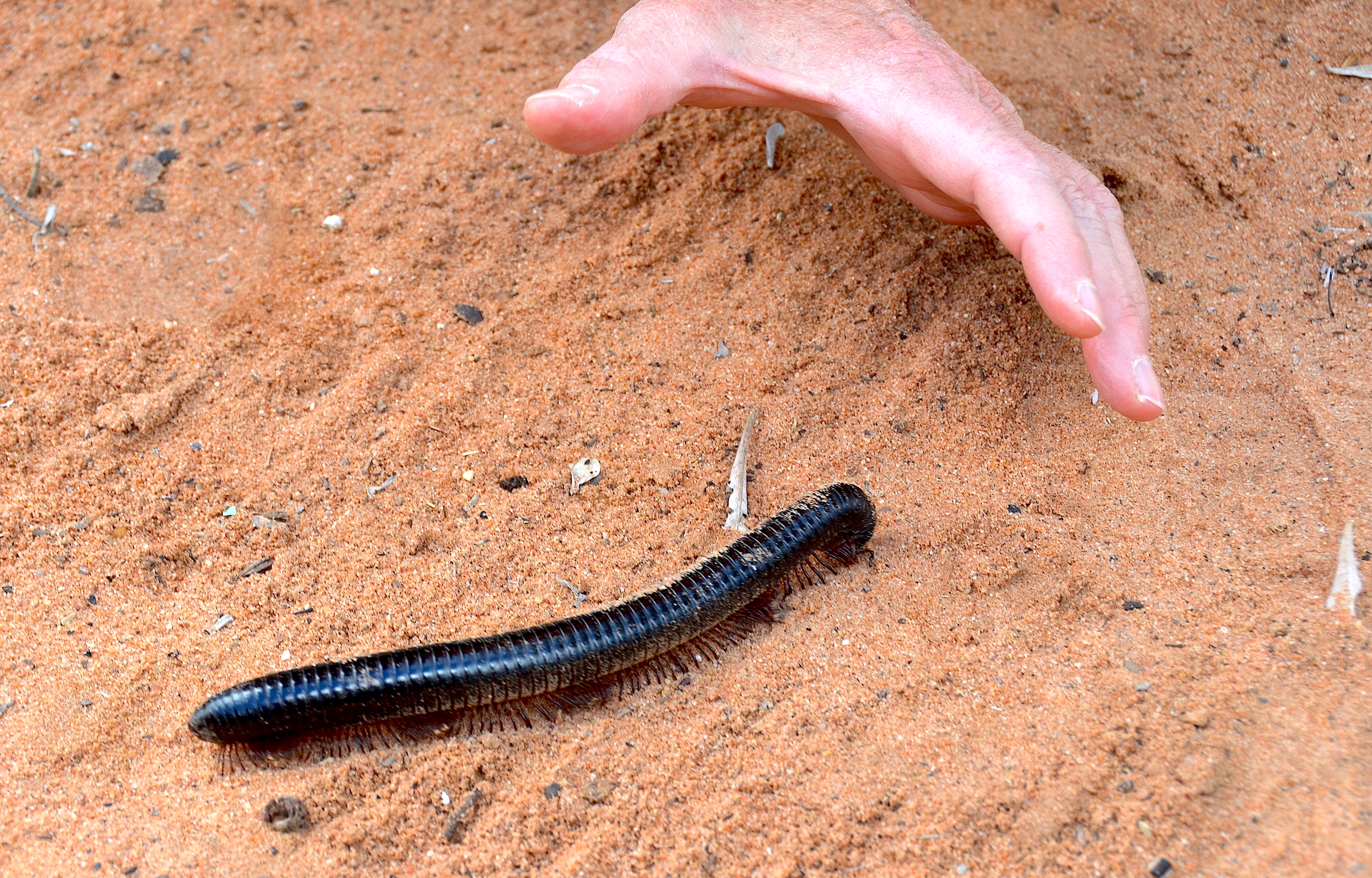
Giant African millipede in Namibia
