= Plusioporus =

Scientific classification
- Kingdom: Animalia
- Phylum: Arthropoda
- Subphylum: Myriapoda
- Class: Diplopoda
- Order: Spirostreptida
- Family: Spirostreptidae
- Subfamily: Spirostreptinae
- Tribe: Spirostreptini
- Genus: Plusioporus; Silvestri, 1895

Type species
- Plusioporus salvadorii Silvestri, 1895

Genus of millipedes

Plusioporus is a genus of millipedes in the family Spirostreptidae. It contains the following species:

- Plusioporus araraquarensis
- Plusioporus brasilianus
- Plusioporus carinulatus
- Plusioporus cristatus
- Plusioporus gigliotosi
- Plusioporus minor
- Plusioporus nigricollis
- Plusioporus novarae
- Plusioporus oyapokanus
- Plusioporus pandeirus
- Plusioporus recifensis
- Plusioporus salvadorii
- Plusioporus setiger
- Plusioporus sicki
- Plusioporus testaceus
- Plusioporus unciger
