= Cearostreptus =

Scientific classification
- Kingdom: Animalia
- Phylum: Arthropoda
- Subphylum: Myriapoda
- Class: Diplopoda
- Order: Spirostreptida
- Family: Spirostreptidae
- Subfamily: Spirostreptinae
- Tribe: Spirostreptini
- Genus: Cearostreptus; Schubart, 1945

Type species
- Cearostreptus triangulatus Schubart, 1945

Genus of millipedes

Cearostreptus is a genus of millipedes in the family Spirostreptidae. It contains the following species:

- Cearostreptus schubarti (Krabbe, 1982)
- Cearostreptus triangulatus (Schubart, 1945)
