= Eumastigonus =

Scientific classification
- Kingdom: Animalia
- Phylum: Arthropoda
- Subphylum: Myriapoda
- Class: Diplopoda
- Order: Spirostreptida
- Family: Iulomorphidae
- Genus: Eumastigonus; Chamberlin, 1920

Genus of millipede

Eumastigonus is a genus of millipede, endemic to New Zealand. They are large, long, generally brown, and important in breaking down nutrients and rotting matter in the ecosystem. There are at least 8 species. They were described initially by Chamberlin in 1920. Along with other families and orders of millipedes in New Zealand, this genus is poorly known and there are many undescribed species. Identification to the species level in the field may often be impossible.

== Taxonomy ==
Eumastigonus may contain the following species:

- Eumastigonus hemmingseni
- Eumastigonus kaorinus
- Eumastigonus distinctior
- Eumastigonus hallelujah
- Eumastigonus striatus
- Eumastigonus waitahae
- Eumastigonus parvus
- Eumastigonus ater
- Eumastigonus insulanis
- Eumastigonus maior
- Eumastigonus otekauri
