= Bicoxidens =

Scientific classification
- Kingdom: Animalia
- Phylum: Arthropoda
- Subphylum: Myriapoda
- Class: Diplopoda
- Order: Spirostreptida
- Family: Spirostreptidae
- Subfamily: Spirostreptinae
- Tribe: Spirostreptini
- Genus: Bicoxidens; Attems, 1928

Type species
- Bicoxidens nigerrimus Attems, 1928

Genus of millipedes

Bicoxidens is a genus of millipedes in the family Spirostreptidae. It contains the following species:

- Bicoxidens aridis
- Bicoxidens brincki
- Bicoxidens flavicollis
- Bicoxidens friendi
- Bicoxidens gokwensis
- Bicoxidens grandis
- Bicoxidens matopoensis
- Bicoxidens nigerrimus
- Bicoxidens nyathi
