= Lindsay Wildlife Experience =

Museum and wildlife rehabilitation center in California

Coordinates: 37.9235°N 122.0757°W

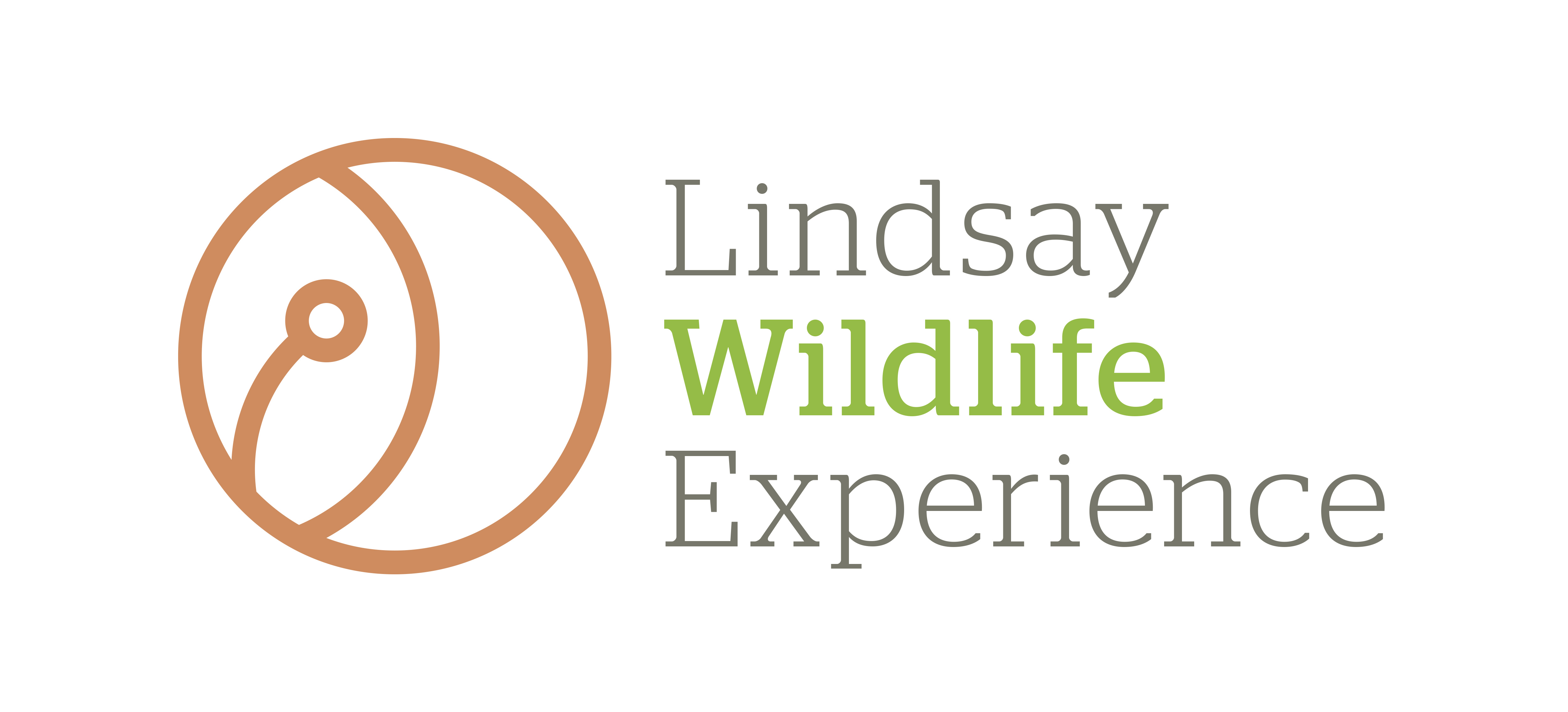

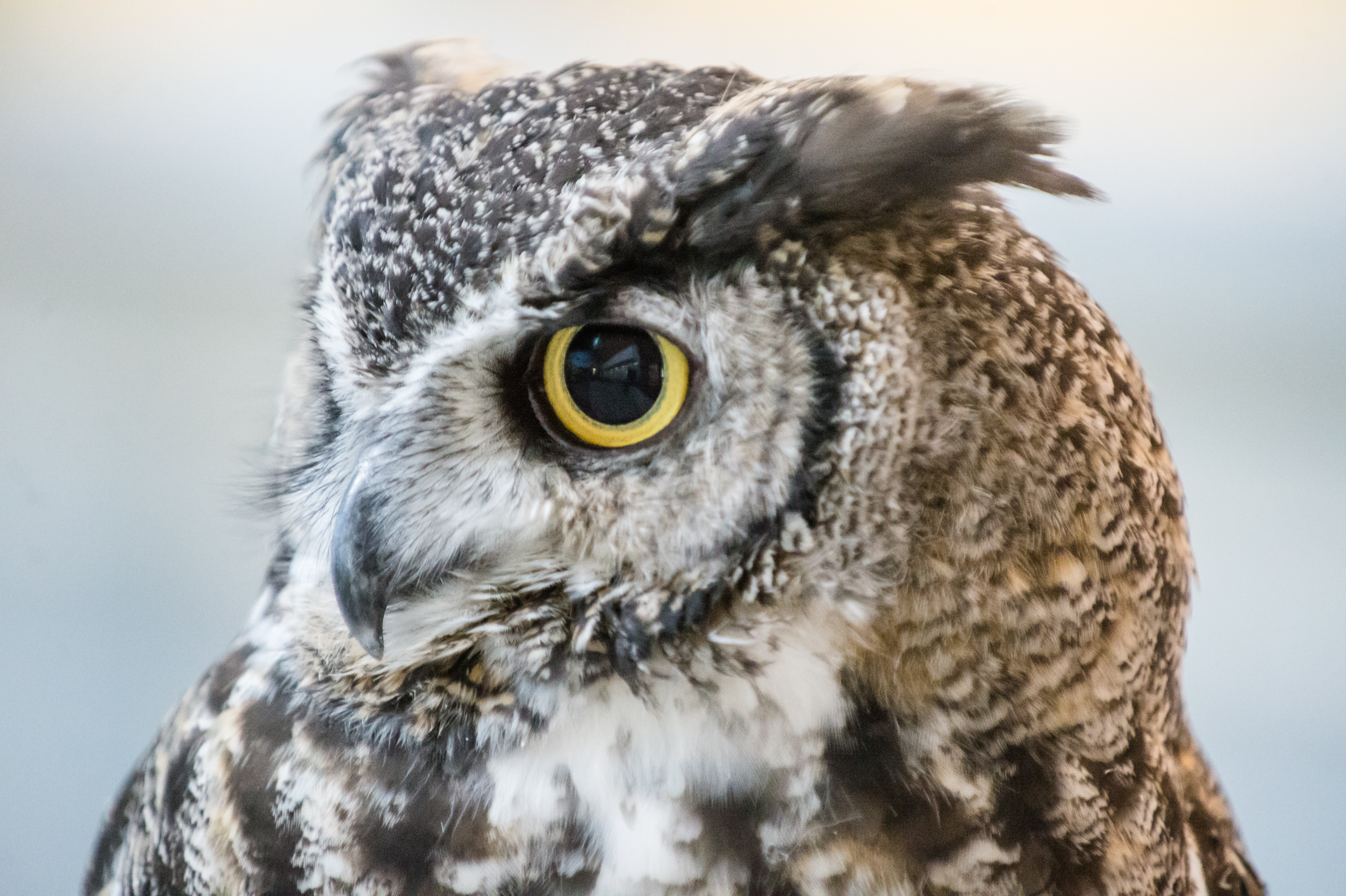
A close-up photograph of Bubo, Lindsay's resident great horned owl

Lindsay Wildlife Experience, formerly known as Lindsay Wildlife Museum, is a family museum and wildlife rehabilitation center in Walnut Creek, California. Lindsay is the first wildlife hospital established in the United States, and a popular family museum in the East Bay Area near San Francisco. Founded in Walnut Creek in 1955, the museum's programs "connect people with wildlife to inspire responsibility and respect for the world we share." The museum features a number of California wildlife exhibits, natural history specimens, and a special theater offering a look into one of the hospital's many wildlife treatment rooms. The rehabilitation center—still among the largest in the country—treats more than 5,000 injured, sick, or orphaned wild animals each year.

== History ==
Lindsay Wildlife Museum was founded in 1955 by Alexander Lindsay as the Diablo Junior Museum. It became the Alexander Lindsay Junior Museum in 1962 after Alexander Lindsay died at 44. In 1965 it moved to a water-pump house in Larkey Park in Walnut Creek. In 1970 the museum started the first formal wildlife rehabilitation program in the United States. In 1986 the City of Walnut Creek ended operations and the museum became an independently operated not-for-profit organization. The next year "Junior" was dropped from the title, making it the Lindsay Museum. In 1993 the museum moved to a newly built 28,000-square-foot (2,600 m^{2}) museum near the old pump house. Three years later the name was changed to Lindsay Wildlife Museum. In recent years, the museum has added a number of major new exhibits. Wildlife Hospital Behind the Scenes lets visitors watch a live veterinary procedure at the hospital through a large, one-way window. At Raptors visitors can soar virtually over Mount Diablo and measure their armspan against raptors' wingspans. At Hive Alive! and Hive to Honey~Honey Bees and Beekeepers at Work visitors can watch thousands of live bees and their queen and learn what jobs different bees do. In fall 2013, the museum opened the new exhibit The Burrow where visitors can go "underground" to discover the world of wildlife beneath their feet. The museum changed its name to Lindsay Wildlife Experience in 2015.

== Hospital ==
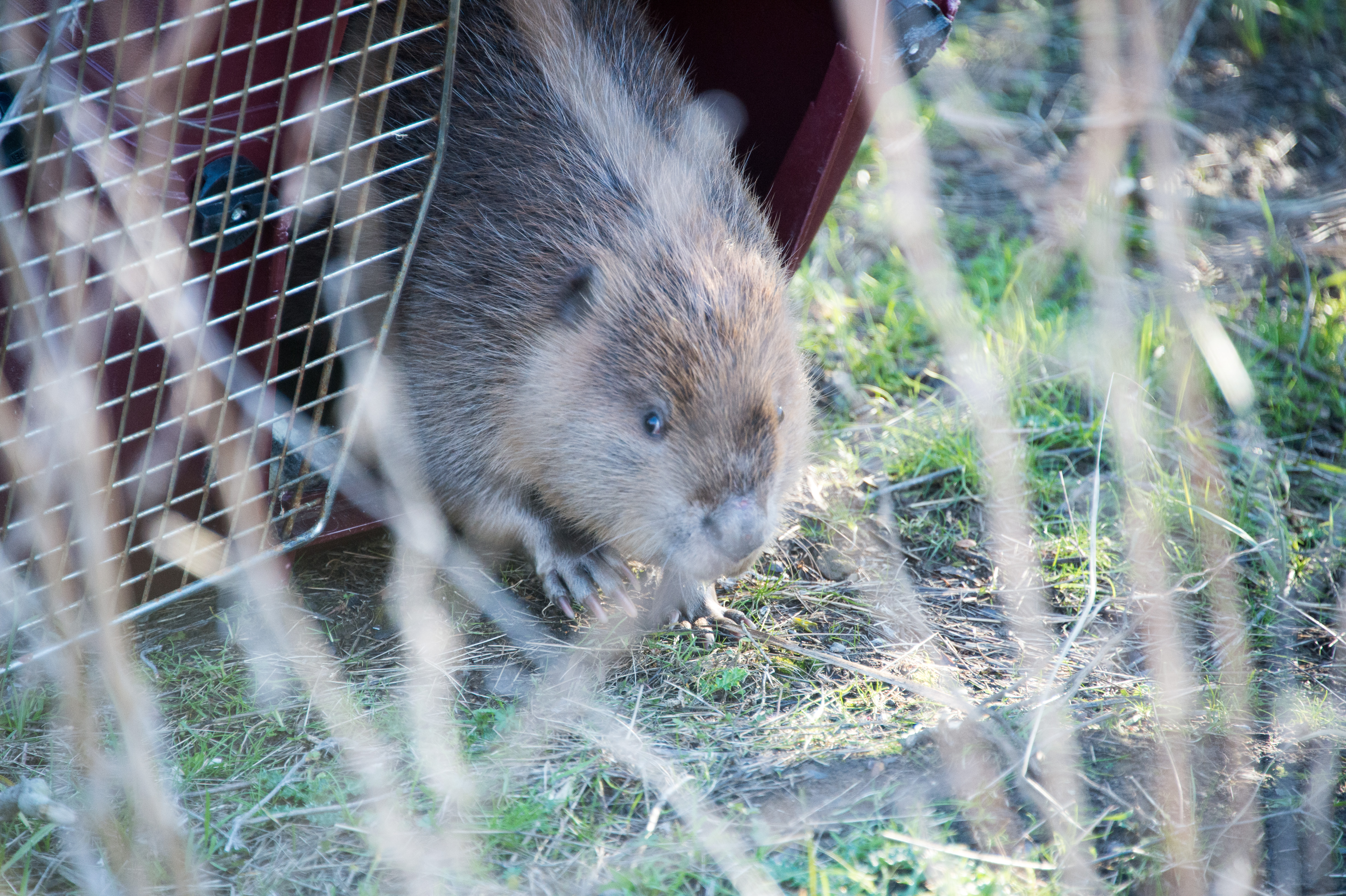
A North American beaver returning to the wild after being successfully rehabilitated at Lindsay Wildlife Hospital

The wildlife rehabilitation hospital at the museum receives more than 5,000 California native wild animal patients every year. The hospital is a pioneer in wildlife rehabilitation and many now-standard protocols across the country were developed here. Hospital staff and volunteers treat animals that have been poisoned, struck by automobiles, fallen from trees during trimming, and injured by other often human-related activities. They also care for orphaned young, both onsite and at the homes of specially trained volunteers. After being treated, an animal is released back into the wild. If it cannot be safely released, it may join the museum as a resident "animal ambassador". As many animals brought to the hospital are cat-caught, the museum strongly encourages visitors to keep their cats indoors.

== Animal ambassadors ==
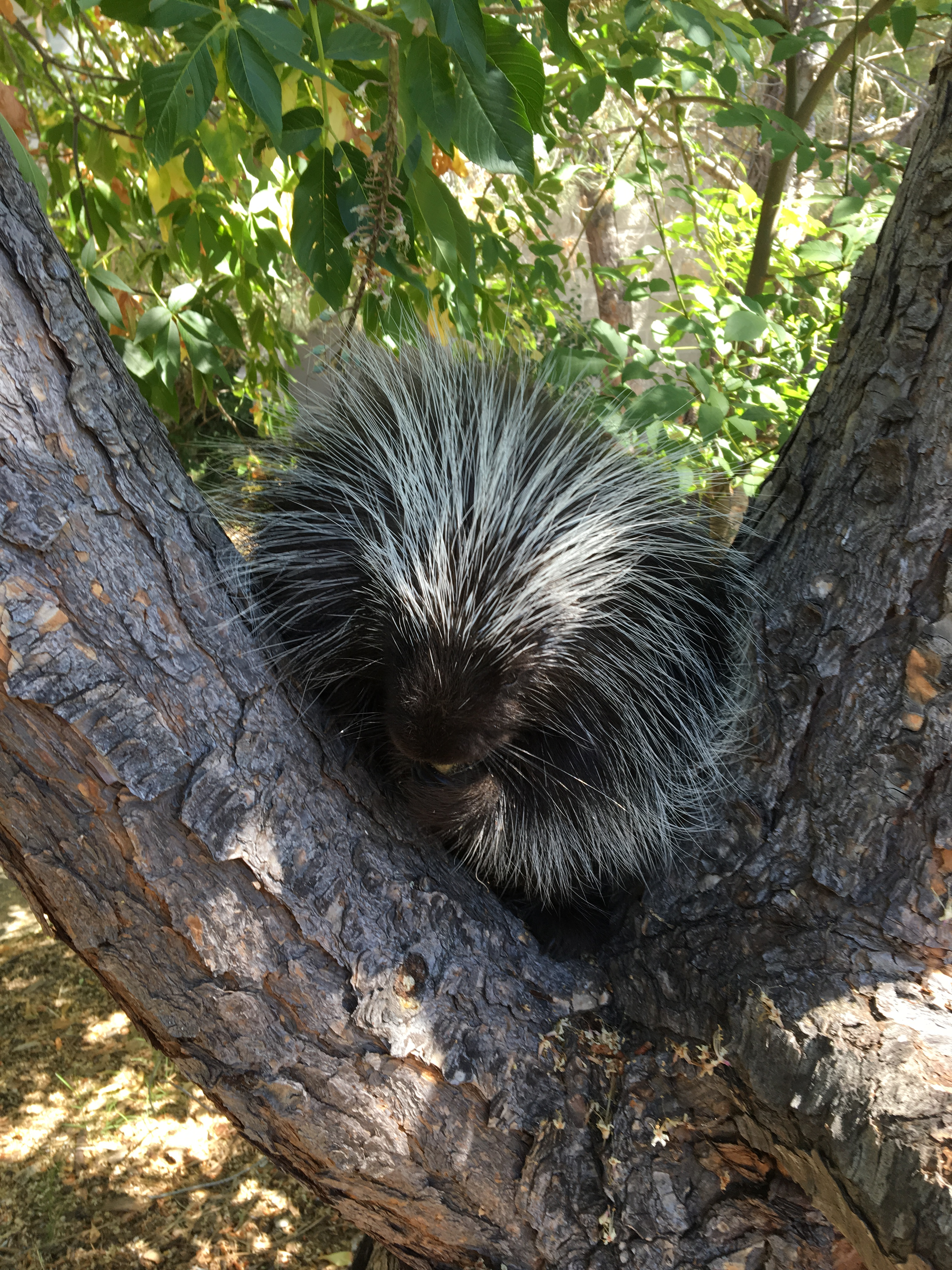
Penelope, Lindsay Wildlife Experience's resident North American porcupine

Lindsay Wildlife Experience specializes in the care of animals unable to return to the wild. Of the 70 animals that call Lindsay Wildlife home, nearly all of them have a physical, psychological, or behavioral problem that would make them unable to survive in the wild. All of the animals that live at Lindsay Wildlife Experience serve as animal ambassadors and educate the public on conservation and natural history. Some animals are on view to the public; others live off-exhibit and are brought out for presentations, classes, tours, and private animal encounters.

=== Amphibians ===
- California tiger salamander

=== Birds ===
- Acorn woodpecker
- American kestrel
- Bald eagle
- Band-tailed pigeon
- Golden eagle
- Great horned owl
- Harris's hawk
- Mourning dove
- Peregrine falcon
- Red-shouldered hawk
- Red-tailed hawk
- Swainson's hawk
- Turkey vulture
- Western screech owl
- White-tailed kite

=== Mammals ===
- Domestic rabbit
- Domestic rat
- Ground squirrel
- Guinea pig
- Mexican free-tailed bat
- North American porcupine
- Virginia opossum

=== Reptiles ===
- Aquatic garter snake
- California kingsnake
- California mountain kingsnake
- Common chuckwalla
- Desert iguana
- Pacific gopher snake
- Northern alligator lizard
- Southern alligator lizard
- Western pond turtle

=== Invertebrates ===
- Banana slug
- Black widow spider
- Cactus longhorn beetle
- Chilean rose tarantula
- Desert blond tarantula
- Desert hairy scorpion
- Desert millipede
- Madagascar hissing cockroach
- Wolf spider
