= Telodeinopus =

Scientific classification
- Kingdom: Animalia
- Phylum: Arthropoda
- Subphylum: Myriapoda
- Class: Diplopoda
- Order: Spirostreptida
- Family: Spirostreptidae
- Subfamily: Spirostreptinae
- Tribe: Spirostreptini
- Genus: Telodeinopus; Verhoeff, 1941

Genus of millipedes

Telodeinopus is a genus of giant African millipedes in family Spirostreptidae, containing the following species:

- Telodeinopus aoutii (Demange, 1971)
- Telodeinopus assiniensis (Attems, 1914)
- Telodeinopus bibundinus (Attems, 1914)
- Telodeinopus canaliculatus (Porat, 1894) (was Telodeinopus eidmanni,Verhoeff, 1941)
- Telodeinopus chapini (Chamberlin, 1927)
- Telodeinopus exilis (Attems, 1934)
- Telodeinopus lanceolatus (Demange, 1965)
- Telodeinopus sicarius (Attems, 1935)
- Telodeinopus sulcatus (Voges, 1878)
- Telodeinopus variabilis (Cook & Collins, 1893)
- Telodeinopus villiersi (Demange, 1971)
