= Camaricoproctus =

Scientific classification
- Kingdom: Animalia
- Phylum: Arthropoda
- Subphylum: Myriapoda
- Class: Diplopoda
- Order: Spirostreptida
- Family: Spirostreptidae
- Tribe: Metriostreptini
- Genus: Camaricoproctus; Attems, 1926

Type species
- Camaricoproctus bombycinus Attems, 1926

Genus of millipedes

Camaricoproctus is a genus of millipedes in the family Spirostreptidae. It contains the following species:

- Camaricoproctus bombycinus (Attems, 1928)
- Camaricoproctus disparatidens (Lawrence, 1965)
- Camaricoproctus gracilidens (Lawrence, 1965)
- Camaricoproctus pauciannulatus (Jeekel, 1956)
- Camaricoproctus planidens (Lawrence, 1965)
- Camaricoproctus torquidens (Lawrence, 1965)
- Camaricoproctus transvaalicus (Lawrence, 1966)
- Camaricoproctus tumididens (Lawrence, 1965)
