= Triaenostreptus =

Scientific classification
- Kingdom: Animalia
- Phylum: Arthropoda
- Subphylum: Myriapoda
- Class: Diplopoda
- Order: Spirostreptida
- Family: Spirostreptidae
- Genus: Triaenostreptus

Genus of millipedes

Triaenostreptus is a genus of giant African millipedes in family Spirostreptidae, containing eight species:

- Triaenostreptus benedictus (Kraus, 1958)
- Triaenostreptus kruegeri (Attems, 1928)
- Triaenostreptus kymatorhabdus (Attems, 1914)
- Triaenostreptus lawrencei (Hoffman, 1971)
- Triaenostreptus lykophorus (Attems, 1934)
- Triaenostreptus robustus (Attems, 1935)
- Triaenostreptus tripartitus (Cook & Collins, 1893)
- Triaenostreptus unciger (Attems, 1928)
