= Mardonius =

Mardonius may refer to:

- Mardonius (nephew of Darius I), Persian commander during the second Persian invasion of Greece
- Mardonius (philosopher), tutor and adviser of Roman emperor Julian (331–363)
- Mardonius (millipede), a genus of giant African millipedes

== See also ==
- Operation Mardonius, a 1943 British military campaign
