= Sechelleptus =

Scientific classification
- Kingdom: Animalia
- Phylum: Arthropoda
- Subphylum: Myriapoda
- Class: Diplopoda
- Order: Spirostreptida
- Family: Spirostreptidae
- Genus: Sechelleptus; Mauriès, 1980

Type species
- Sechelleptus seychellarum Desjardins, 1835

Genus of millipede

Sechelleptus is a genus of millipedes in the family Spirostreptidae. The genus is found within the East African Indian Ocean islands, including Madagascar, The Seychelles, Mauritius, the Comoro Islands, and Unguja. It contains the following species:

- Sechelleptus aberrans (Brölemann, 1923)
- Sechelleptus anulatus (Attems, 1914)
- Sechelleptus arborivagus VandenSpiegel, Henrard & Mathys, 2021
- Sechelleptus argus (Attems, 1896)
- Sechelleptus betaminena (De Saussure & Zehntner, 1902)
- Sechelleptus confusus (Attems, 1950)
- Sechelleptus coriaceus (De Saussure & Zehntner, 1901)
- Sechelleptus dauphini (De Saussure & Zehntner, 1902)
- Sechelleptus fulgens (De Saussure & Zehntner, 1901)
- Sechelleptus gonospinosus (Atems, 1910)
- Sechelleptus kalobaptus (Attems, 1914)
- Sechelleptus krabbae Jeekel, 1999
- Sechelleptus lambertoni (Brölemann, 1923)
- Sechelleptus lobifer (Attems, 1951)
- Sechelleptus macilentus (De Saussure & Zehntner, 1897)
- Sechelleptus metazonalis (De Saussure & Zehntner, 1901)
- Sechelleptus moramangae (De Saussure & Zehntner, 1897)
- Sechelleptus multiporus (Attems, 1951)
- Sechelleptus nigritus (De Saussure & Zehntner, 1897)
- Sechelleptus obscuratus (Attems, 1914)
- Sechelleptus obscurus (Attems, 1951)
- Sechelleptus piesthopygus (Attems, 1914)
- Sechelleptus praepolitus (Attems, 1910)
- Sechelleptus procerus (Attems, 1951)
- Sechelleptus punctatulus (Attems, 1910)
- Sechelleptus pyrhozonus (Gerstäcker, 1873)
- Sechelleptus scabricollis (De Saussure & Zehntner, 1897)
- Sechelleptus seychellarum (Desjardins, 1835)
- Sechelleptus speculorbis (Attems, 1910)
- Sechelleptus sulcicollis (De Saussure & Zehntner, 1897)
- Sechelleptus unilineatus Golovatch & Korsós, 1992
- Sechelleptus variabilis VandenSpiegel & Golovatch, 2007
