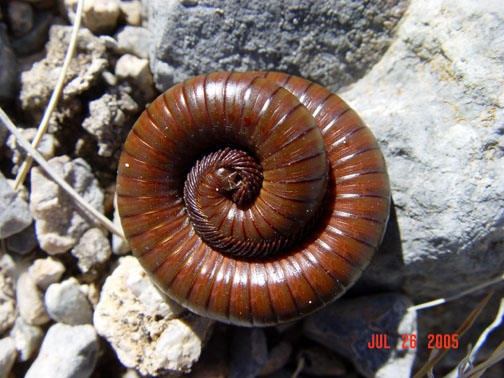
- A specimen found in San Andres National Wildlife Refuge, New Mexico, USA

Scientific classification
- Kingdom: Animalia
- Phylum: Arthropoda
- Subphylum: Myriapoda
- Class: Diplopoda
- Order: Spirostreptida
- Family: Spirostreptidae
- Genus: Orthoporus
- Species: O. ornatus

Binomial name
- Orthoporus ornatus (Girard, 1853)

= Orthoporus ornatus =

Species of millipede

Orthoporus ornatus (also known as the desert millipede) is a North American species of millipede in the family Spirostreptidae that can be found in the U.S. states of Arizona, New Mexico and Texas, and as far south as the Mexican state of San Luis Potosí. They became very popular in the pet trade and many were exported to Western Europe. Brian Van Der Kieft and Max Prins were the first breeders of this species in Europe. Individuals on average are 4 inches (10 cm) in length, but can either be as small as 3 inches (76 mm), or exceed up to 9 inches (230 mm) in length. They are dark brownish coloured, but can sometimes be yellow. In fact, in every state the species looks different. The antennae are located near the organs of Tömösváry. The species feed on both living and dead organic material. The species prefer sunshine, but can be seen on summer rainy days as well. A disturbed Orthoporus ornatus may curl into a coil and release a toxic substance from glands that are located along the sides of their body segments. The species can live more than ten years. The species feed on shrubs of Ephedra, which grows in Jornada del Muerto, and on Salsola that grows in Albuquerque.

== Classification ==
The class of this organism is Diplopoda, a diverse group of arthropods. An arthropod can be referred to as an invertebrate that has an exoskeleton, a segmented body and jointed appendages. It can also be put into a group called edaphic organisms since it spends most of its time in the soil. Edaphic means pertaining to the soil.

== Description ==
The desert millipede is generally large, long, and has many legs and body segments. The head, which is the first body segment, has a paired organ called the Organ of Tömösváry. This is a sensory organ located at the base of each of the antennae. For every body segment there are two pairs of legs. Desert millipedes shed every time they add a new body segment.

== Range ==
The desert millipede lives in the Sonoran Desert of western North America. More specifically, it was once found in the eastern city limits of Phoenix, Arizona, and the Papago Park in Phoenix. In general, this millipede lives in a desert ecosystem where there are abundant rocks, shrubs, damp soil and other tree trunks. In one study the desert millipede was also found in Albuquerque, New Mexico, with another found in Texas.

== Ecology ==
Orthoporus ornatus inhabits deep, damp soil of desert ecosystems, residing in small channels and voids in the soil. The soil contains abundant food sources as well as acts as protection from above--ground biotic or abiotic effects such as predation, weather, and ultraviolet radiation.

The desert millipede's main food source is bacteria and dead plant material and tissues of dead shrubs such as cholla, creosote bush, and ocotillo. It also eats surface litter and bark of "Mormon tea" and mesquite as well as tiny pieces of sand, rock, and other invertebrate animals. It is incapable of feeding in the absence of moist soil. Feeding behaviors above-ground are not observed year-round, as the millipede only comes to the surface once annually. When emerging, it feeds voraciously in an effort to store sufficient energy for when it returns to the soil. This behavior is thought to contribute to desert nutrient cycling.

The millipede has defenses against predation, though its subterranean habitat offers the greatest protection. There are about thirteen species that have been observed to feed on the millipedes.

== Behavior ==
Orthoporus ornatus is a slow-moving organism. It is mostly nocturnal; however, it emerges after rainy periods in the early mornings when the soil is moist. It spends most of its time in self-dug burrows. Once the soil is dried up from the desert sun it will go back into the deep soil. Their movement has been documented to be at its peak during the early mornings with some nocturnal activity as well. Soil-surface activity stopped before the surface temperature reached 35 degrees Celsius and began again when the ground resumed to 35 degrees Celsius. During high-temperature periods, it can be found under rocks and sometimes on the aerial portions of shrubs; though this was only observed when the air temperature was 35.5 degree Celsius.

== Interactions with humans ==
The desert millipede is a very simple creature that will keep to itself unless bothered or feels threatened. It will curl up into a ball, or coil, when it is disturbed. Sometimes it may even release a noxious substance out from the side of its body, or more specifically, through glands that are on top of its legs. This liquid smells and tastes bad. It is toxic to anything that might eat it. This liquid can irritate the skin of a human and will definitely irritate the eyes.

Orthoporus ornatus can be seen as a beneficial and useful part of the desert ecosystem. Because the desert is such a dry place, dead plants and animals take an extra long time to fully decay. The millipede will eat on these decaying matters and "clean up" their environment. If these small organisms did not exist, the desert would overpopulate with dead plants, dead animals and bacteria. Its species life span can range up to 10 years.
