= Urostreptus =

Scientific classification
- Kingdom: Animalia
- Phylum: Arthropoda
- Subphylum: Myriapoda
- Class: Diplopoda
- Order: Spirostreptida
- Family: Spirostreptidae
- Tribe: Orthogoneptini
- Genus: Urostreptus; Silvestri, 1897

Type species
- Urostreptus camerani Silvestri, 1895

Genus of millipedes

Urostreptus is a genus of millipedes in the family Spirostreptidae. It contains the following species:

- Urostreptus atrobrunneus
- Urostreptus auritus
- Urostreptus borellii
- Urostreptus camerani
- Urostreptus carvalhoi
- Urostreptus caudifer
- Urostreptus cultratus
- Urostreptus fallax
- Urostreptus hassleri
- Urostreptus mineri
- Urostreptus mundurucensis
- Urostreptus paxillatus
- Urostreptus robustus
- Urostreptus tampiitauensis
- Urostreptus travassosi
