= Brevitibius =

Scientific classification
- Kingdom: Animalia
- Phylum: Arthropoda
- Subphylum: Myriapoda
- Class: Diplopoda
- Order: Spirostreptida
- Family: Spirostreptidae
- Subfamily: Spirostreptinae
- Tribe: Spirostreptini
- Genus: Brevitibius; Attems, 1950

Type species
- Brevitibius angolanus Attems, 1934

Genus of millipedes

Brevitibius is a genus of millipedes in the family Spirostreptidae. It contains the following species:

- Brevitibius angolanus
- Brevitibius obtusus
- Brevitibius ondundu
- Brevitibius oongongololo
- Brevitibius polyptychus
