= Gymnostreptus =

Scientific classification
- Kingdom: Animalia
- Phylum: Arthropoda
- Subphylum: Myriapoda
- Class: Diplopoda
- Order: Spirostreptida
- Family: Spirostreptidae
- Subfamily: Spirostreptinae
- Tribe: Spirostreptini
- Genus: Gymnostreptus; Brölemann, 1902

Type species
- Gymnostreptus perfidus Brölemann, 1902

Genus of millipedes

Gymnostreptus is a genus of millipedes in the family Spirostreptidae. It contains the following species:

- Gymnostreptus acuticollis
- Gymnostreptus bahianus
- Gymnostreptus bovei
- Gymnostreptus branconius
- Gymnostreptus flavipes
- Gymnostreptus goyanus
- Gymnostreptus heterogona
- Gymnostreptus longispinus
- Gymnostreptus microps
- Gymnostreptus olivaceus
- Gymnostreptus perfidelis
- Gymnostreptus perfidus
- Gymnostreptus pictus
- Gymnostreptus porati
- Gymnostreptus punctiporus
- Gymnostreptus roseopygidialis
- Gymnostreptus rusticus
- Gymnostreptus striolatus
- Gymnostreptus subsericeus
- Gymnostreptus vagabundus
- Gymnostreptus ventralis
- Gymnostreptus vulgatus
