= Aulonopygus =

Scientific classification
- Kingdom: Animalia
- Phylum: Arthropoda
- Subphylum: Myriapoda
- Class: Diplopoda
- Order: Spirostreptida
- Family: Spirostreptidae
- Subfamily: Spirostreptinae
- Tribe: Spirostreptini
- Genus: Aulonopygus; Attems, 1914
- Species: A. aculeatus

Binomial name
- Aulonopygus aculeatus Attems, 1914

Genus of millipedes

Aulonopygus is a genus of millipedes in the family Spirostreptidae. It has been found in Ghana and the Ivory Coast. The genus contains a single species, Aulonopygus aculeatus.
