= Choristostreptus =

Scientific classification
- Kingdom: Animalia
- Phylum: Arthropoda
- Subphylum: Myriapoda
- Class: Diplopoda
- Order: Spirostreptida
- Family: Spirostreptidae
- Genus: Choristostreptus; Hoffman, 2008
- Species: C. lawrencei

Binomial name
- Choristostreptus lawrencei (Hoffman, 1971)

Genus of millipedes

Choristostreptus is a genus of millipedes in the family Spirostreptidae. It is found in Malawi. The genus contains a single species, Choristostreptus lawrencei.
