= Attemsostreptus =

Scientific classification
- Kingdom: Animalia
- Phylum: Arthropoda
- Subphylum: Myriapoda
- Class: Diplopoda
- Order: Spirostreptida
- Family: Spirostreptidae
- Tribe: Trachystreptini
- Genus: Attemsostreptus; Verhoeff, 1941

Type species
- Attemsostreptus costatus Verhoeff, 1941

Genus of millipedes

Attemsostreptus is a genus of millipedes in the family Spirostreptidae. It contains the following species:

- Attemsostreptus cataractae
- Attemsostreptus costatus
- Attemsostreptus julostriatus
- Attemsostreptus leptoptilos
- Attemsostreptus reflexus
