= Anethoporus =

Scientific classification
- Kingdom: Animalia
- Phylum: Arthropoda
- Subphylum: Myriapoda
- Class: Diplopoda
- Order: Spirostreptida
- Family: Spirostreptidae
- Subfamily: Spirostreptinae
- Tribe: Spirostreptini
- Genus: Anethoporus; Chamberlin, 1918

Type species
- Anethoporus clarki Chamberlin, 1918

Synonyms
- Andenostreptus

Genus of millipedes

Anethoporus is a genus of spirostreptid millipedes native to northern South America, where they range from Peru to the islands of Trinidad and Tobago. The genus and type species, A. clarki, was established by Ralph V. Chamberlin in 1918.

== Species ==
Anethoporus contains nine species, some previously assigned to other genera.

- Anethoporus abstemius (Karsch, 1881) - Cuba
- Anethoporus clarki (Chamberlin, 1918) - Trinidad and Tobago
- Anethoporus gracilior (Chamberlin, 1918) - Trinidad and Tobago
- Anethoporus gracilis (Verhoeff, 1941) - Peru
- Anethoporus guayrensis (Silvestri, 1896) - Venezuela
- Anethoporus leviceps (Attems, 1950) - Venezuela
- Anethoporus ornatus (Verhoeff, 1941) - Venezuela
- Anethoporus schalleri (Kraus, 1960) - Peru
- Anethoporus silvaticus (Verhoeff, 1941) - Peru
