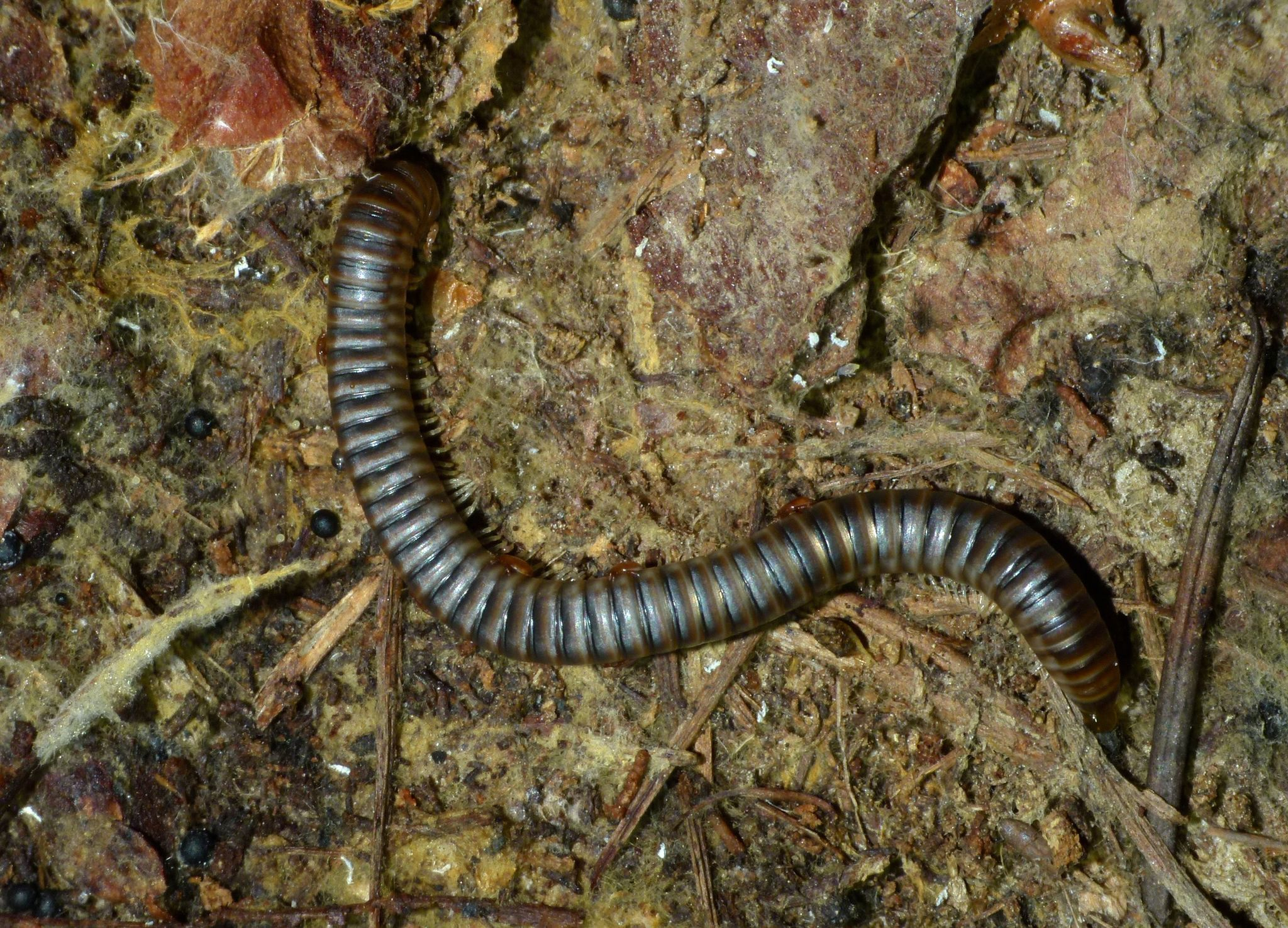
- Iulomorphidae, Dunedin, New Zealand

Scientific classification
- Kingdom: Animalia
- Phylum: Arthropoda
- Subphylum: Myriapoda
- Class: Diplopoda
- Order: Spirostreptida
- Suborder: Epinannolenidea
- Family: Iulomorphidae

= Iulomorphidae =

Family of millipedes

Iulomorphidae is a family of millipedes in the order Spirostreptida. There are about 11 genera and more than 60 described species in Iulomorphidae.

== Genera ==
These 11 genera belong to the family Iulomorphidae:

- Amastigogonus Brölemann, 1913
- Atelomastix Attems, 1911
- Dinocambala Attems, 1911
- Euethogonus
- Eumastigonus Chamberlin, 1920
- Iulomorpha Porat, 1872
- Merioproscelum Verhoeff, 1924
- Podykipus Attems, 1911
- Samichus Attems, 1911
- Thaumaceratopus Verhoeff, 1924
- Victoriocambala Verhoeff, 1944,1944
