= Atopogestidae =

Scientific classification
- Kingdom: Animalia
- Phylum: Arthropoda
- Subphylum: Myriapoda
- Class: Diplopoda
- Order: Spirostreptida
- Family: Atopogestidae

Family of millipedes

Atopogestidae is a family of millipedes belonging to the order Spirostreptida.

Genera:

- Atopogestus Kraus, 1966
