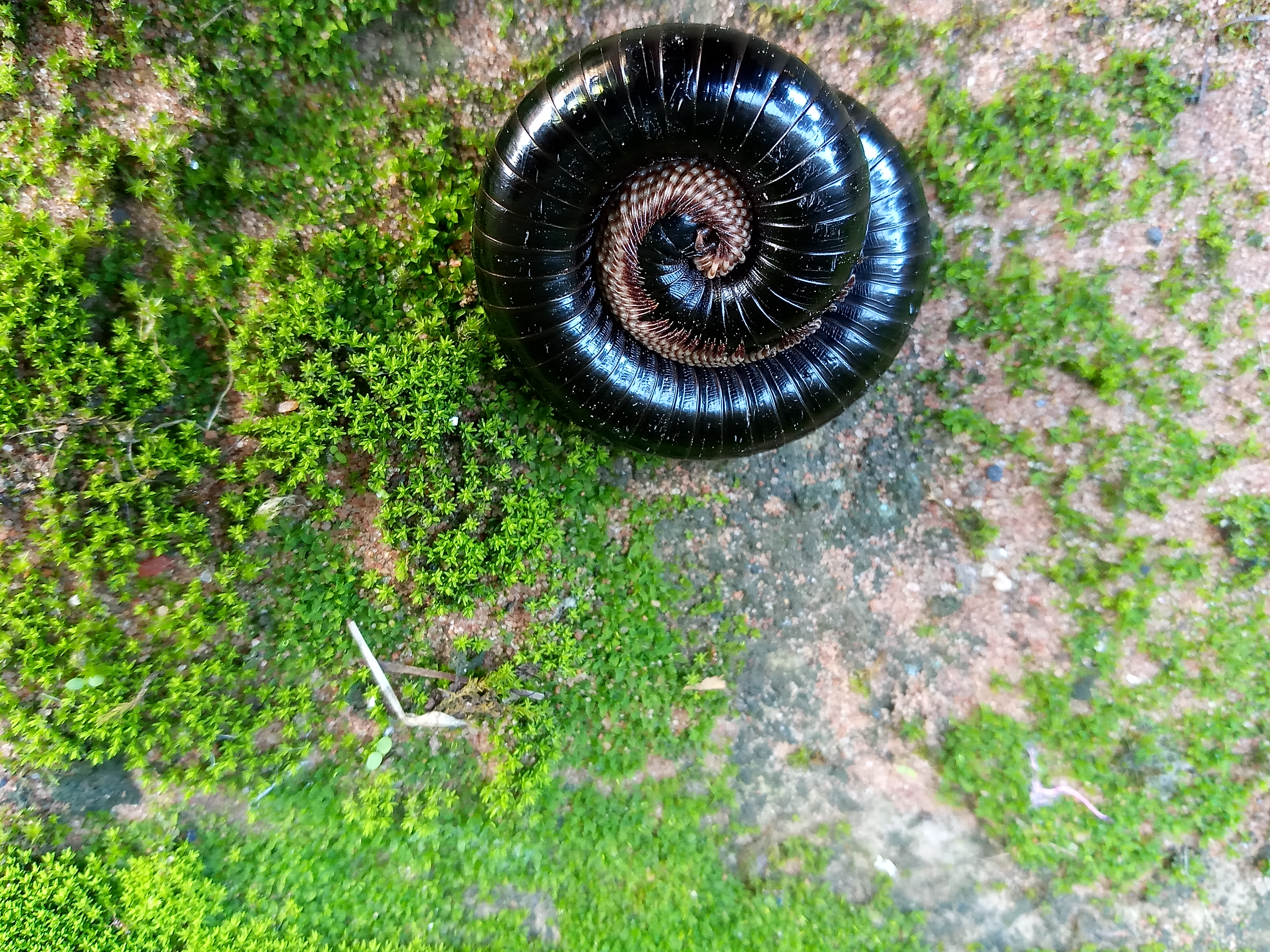
- Archispirostreptus gigas

Scientific classification
- Kingdom: Animalia
- Phylum: Arthropoda
- Subphylum: Myriapoda
- Class: Diplopoda
- Order: Spirostreptida
- Family: Spirostreptidae
- Genus: Archispirostreptus; Silvestri, 1895

= Archispirostreptus =

Genus of millipedes

Archispirostreptus is a genus of giant African millipedes in family Spirostreptidae, containing 10 species:

- Archispirostreptus beccarii Silvestri, 1895
- Archispirostreptus boettegi Silvestri, 1895
- Archispirostreptus divergens Krabbe & Enghoff, 1978
- Archispirostreptus dodsoni Pocock, 1899
- Archispirostreptus gigas Peters, 1855
- Archispirostreptus lugubris Brölemann, 1901
- Archispirostreptus phillipsii Pocock, 1896
- Archispirostreptus smithii Pocock, 1899
- Archispirostreptus syriacus DeSaussure, 1859
- Archispirostreptus tumuliporus Hoffman, 1965
