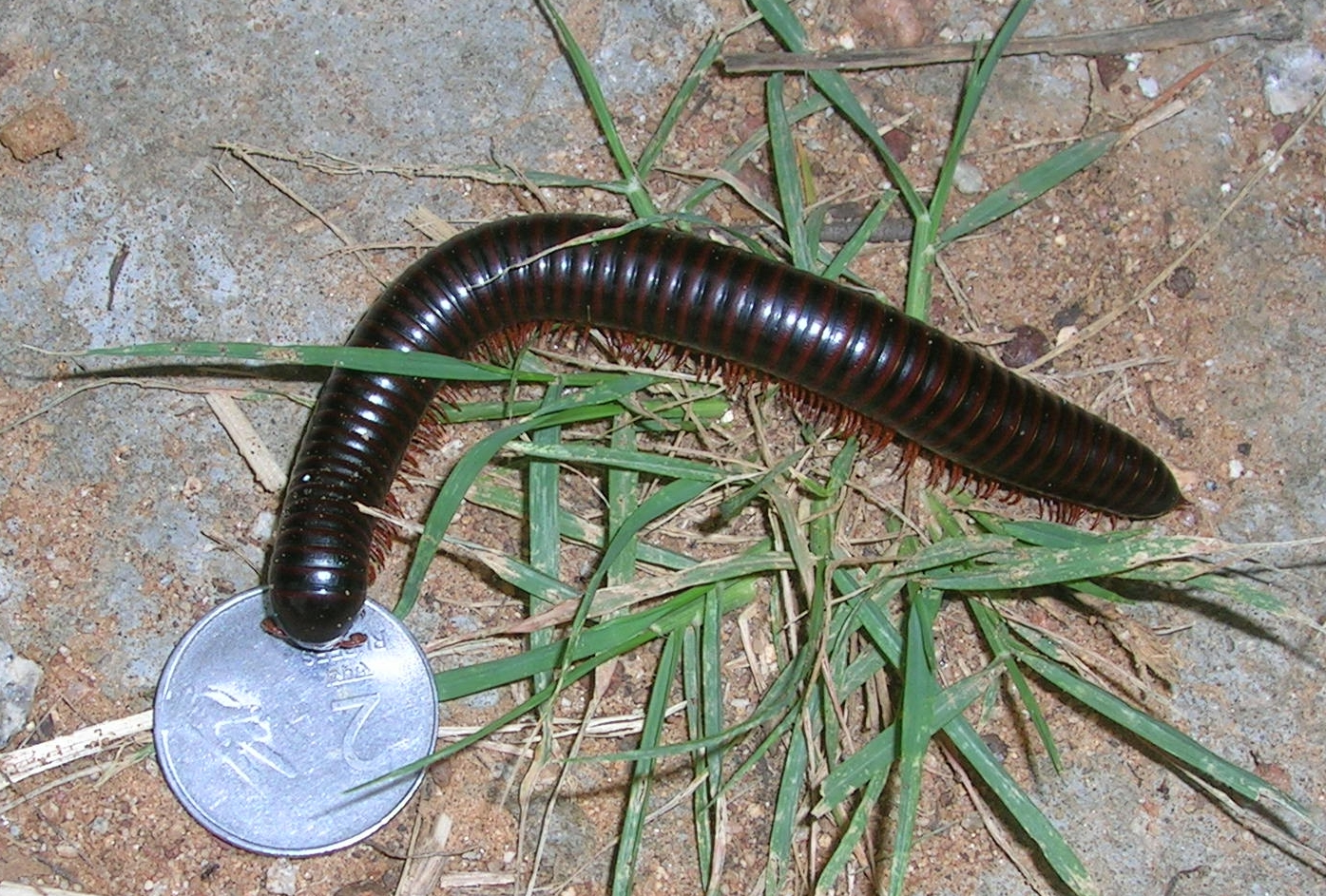

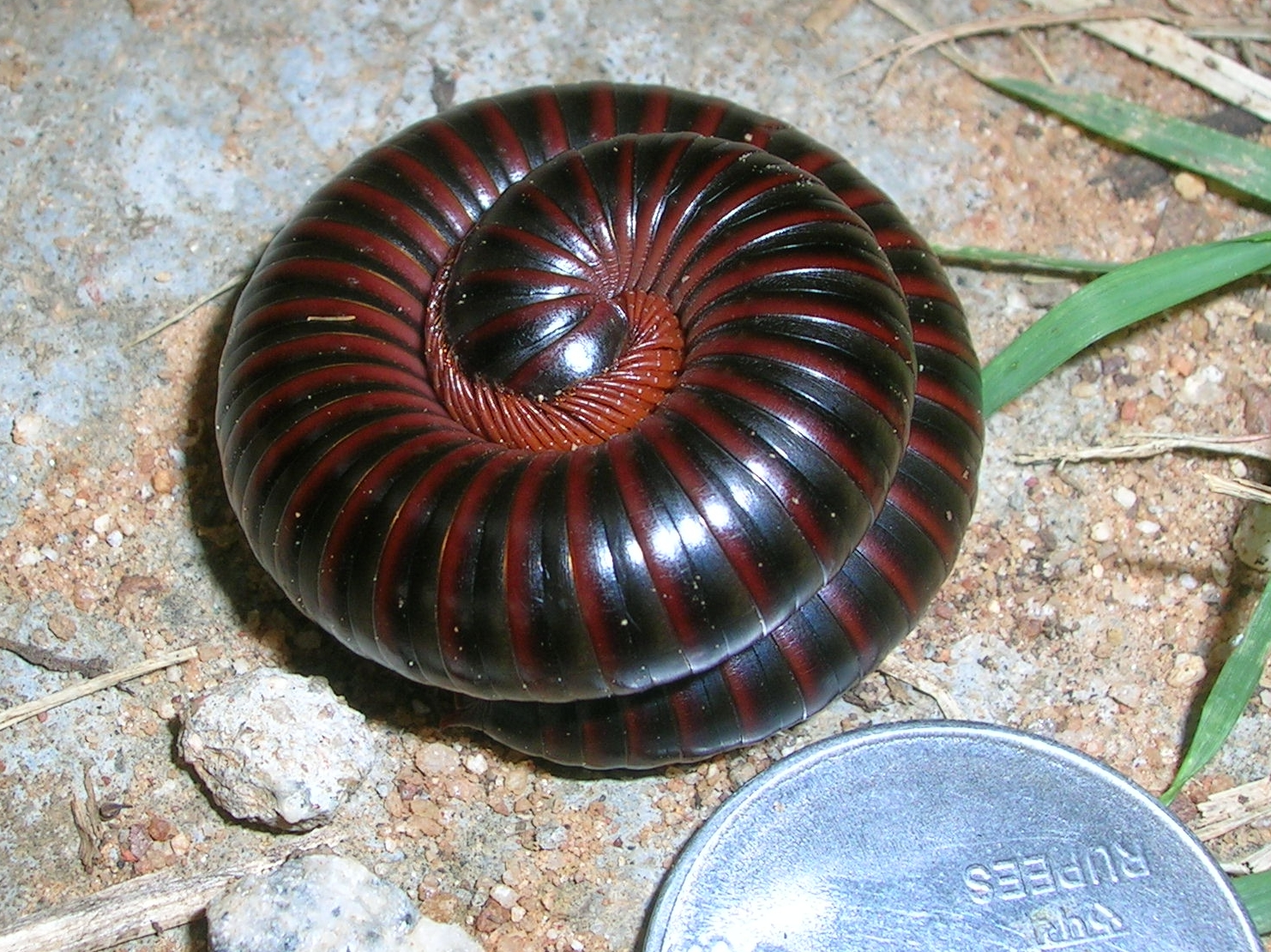

Scientific classification
- Kingdom: Animalia
- Phylum: Arthropoda
- Subphylum: Myriapoda
- Class: Diplopoda
- Order: Spirostreptida
- Family: Harpagophoridae
- Genus: Phyllogonostreptus
- Species: P. nigrolabiatus

Binomial name
- Phyllogonostreptus nigrolabiatus (Newport, 1844)

Synonyms
- Julus nigrolabiatus (Newport, 1844); Spirostreptus nigrolabiatus Newport, 1844; Thyropygus nigrolabiatus (Newport, 1844)

= Phyllogonostreptus nigrolabiatus =

Species of millipede

Phyllogonostreptus nigrolabiatus is a common species of millipede found in India, and Sri Lanka.
