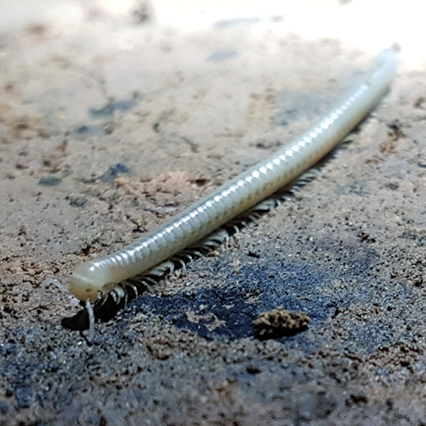
- Pseudonannolene canastra

Scientific classification
- Kingdom: Animalia
- Phylum: Arthropoda
- Subphylum: Myriapoda
- Class: Diplopoda
- Order: Spirostreptida
- Family: Pseudonannolenidae; Silvestri, 1895

= Pseudonannolenidae =

Family of millipedes

Pseudonannolenidae is a family of millipedes belonging to the order Spirostreptida.

Genera:

- Cambalomma Loomis, 1941
- Epinannolene Brölemann, 1903
- Holopodostreptus Carl, 1913
- Phallorthus Chamberlin, 1952
- Physiostreptus Silvestri, 1903
- Pseudonannolene Silvestri, 1895
- Typhlonannolene Chamberlin, 1923
