= Mardonius (millipede) =

Scientific classification
- Kingdom: Animalia
- Phylum: Arthropoda
- Subphylum: Myriapoda
- Class: Diplopoda
- Order: Spirostreptida
- Family: Spirostreptidae
- Subfamily: Spirostreptinae
- Tribe: Spirostreptini
- Genus: Mardonius; Attems, 1914

Genus of millipedes

Mardonius is a genus of giant African millipedes in family Spirostreptidae, containing nine species:

- Mardonius aculeatus Attems, 1914
- Mardonius brasilianus Attems, 1950
- Mardonius cerasopus Attems, 1914
- Mardonius interruptus (Brölemann, 1902)
- Mardonius legationis Attems 1950
- Mardonius nakitawa (Silvestri, 1907)
- Mardonius parvus Demange & Mauriès, 1975
- Mardonius rusticus Attems, 1950
- Mardonius sculpturatus Attems, 1914
