= Protosilvestria =

Protosilvestria Temporal range: Priabonian–Rupelian

Scientific classification
- Kingdom: Animalia
- Phylum: Arthropoda
- Subphylum: Myriapoda
- Class: Diplopoda
- Order: Spirostreptida
- Genus: †Protosilvestria
- Species: †P. sculpta

Binomial name
- †Protosilvestria sculpta Handschin, 1944

Extinct genus of millipede

Protosilvestria is an extinct genus of cambalidean diplopod that lived in France during the Priabonian and Rupelian stages of the Eocene and Oligocene epochs.

== Palaeobiology ==
=== Palaeoecology ===
The type species, Protosilvestria sculpta, dwelt in caves, and this troglodytic life mode likely helped the species to survive the Eocene-Oligocene extinction event that ravaged much of Europe's terrestrial fauna.
