= Adiaphorostreptidae =

Scientific classification
- Kingdom: Animalia
- Phylum: Arthropoda
- Subphylum: Myriapoda
- Class: Diplopoda
- Order: Spirostreptida
- Family: Adiaphorostreptidae

Family of millipedes

Adiaphorostreptidae is a family of millipedes belonging to the order Spirostreptida.

Genera:

- Adiaphorostreptus Hoffman, 1977
