= Demange =

Demange is a French surname. It may refer to:

== People ==
- Joseph Demange (c. 1707—83), French godfather of Madame du Barry
- Edgar Demange (1841—1925), French jurist
- Emmanuel Clément-Demange (born 1970), French footballer
- Jean-Marie Demange (1943—2008), French politician
- Ken DeMange (born 1964), Irish footballer
- Paul Demange (politician) (1906—1970), Monégasque politician
- Paul Demange (actor) (1901—1983), French actor
- Yann Demange (born 1977), French film director

== Other ==
- Demange-aux-Eaux, commune of France.
