= Odontopygidae =

Scientific classification
- Kingdom: Animalia
- Phylum: Arthropoda
- Subphylum: Myriapoda
- Class: Diplopoda
- Order: Spirostreptida
- Suborder: Spirostreptidea
- Superfamily: Odontopygoidea
- Family: Odontopygidae; Attems, 1909

Family of millipedes

Odontopygidae is a family of millipedes belonging to the order Spirostreptida.

== Genera ==
Genera:

- Allantogonus Attems, 1912
- Aquattuor Frederiksen, 2013
- Archepyge Manfredi, 1939
