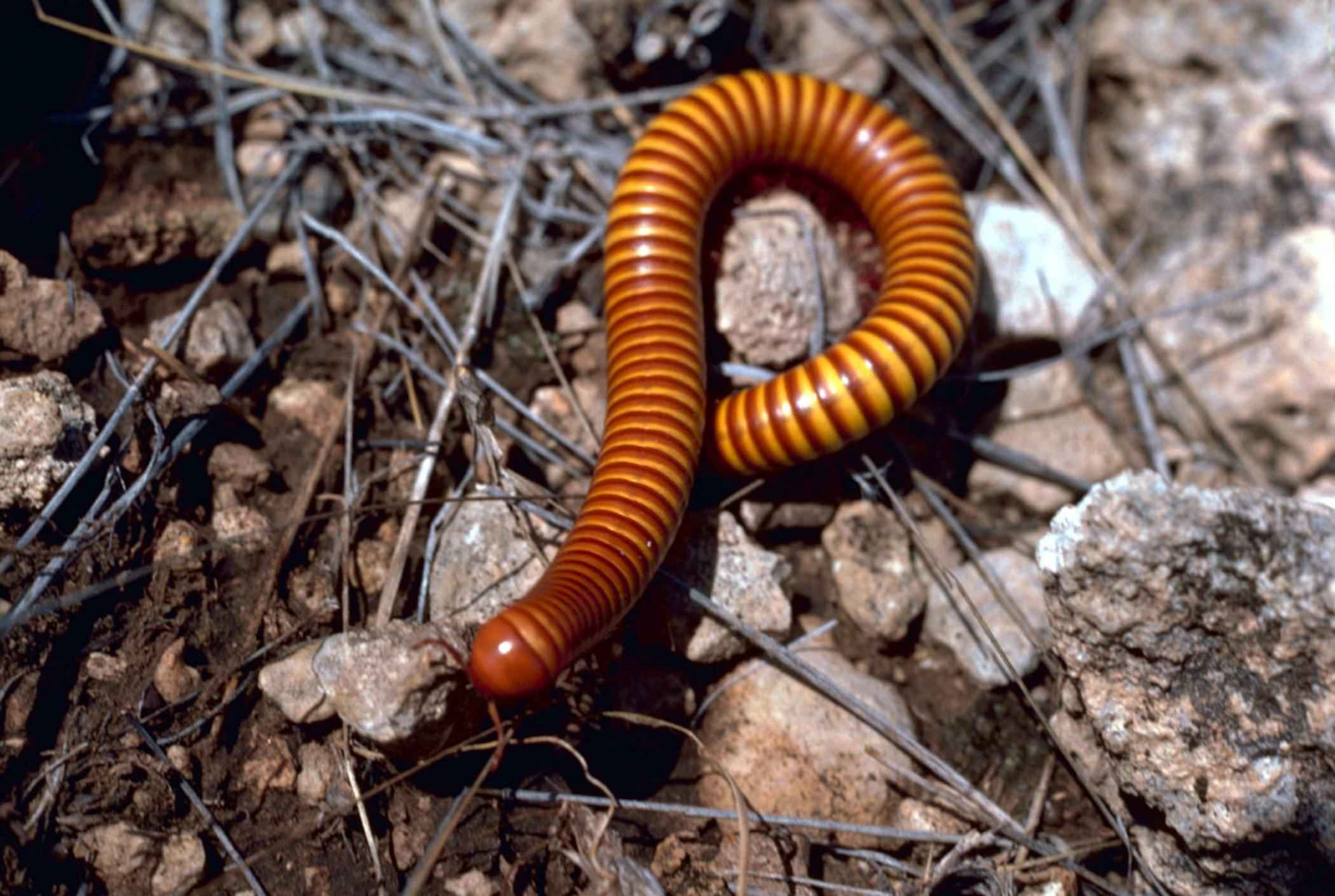
- Orthoporus sp. in New Mexico

Scientific classification
- Kingdom: Animalia
- Phylum: Arthropoda
- Subphylum: Myriapoda
- Class: Diplopoda
- Order: Spirostreptida
- Family: Spirostreptidae
- Genus: Orthoporus; Silvestri, 1897

Type species
- Orthoporus diaporoides Silvestri, 1897

Synonyms
- Diaporus Silvestri, 1897; Scaphiostreptus Brolemann, 1902; Gymnostreptus (Trinidadius) Verhoeff, 1941

= Orthoporus =

Genus of millipedes

Orthoporus is a genus of spirostreptid millipedes, containing around 80 species, distributed from the southern United States to Brazil and Argentina.

- Orthoporus absconsus Chamberlin, 1922
- Orthoporus acanthethus Chamberlin, 1947
- Orthoporus ampussis (Karsch, 1881)
- Orthoporus araguayensis Schubart, 1947
- Orthoporus asper (Attems, 1950)
- Orthoporus bidens Schubart, 1945
- Orthoporus bisulcatus Chamberlin, 1952
- Orthoporus bobos Chamberlin, 1952
- Orthoporus boreus Chamberlin, 1947
- Orthoporus brasiliensis Schubart, 1947
- Orthoporus caelatus Loomis, 1936
- Orthoporus canalis (Chamberlin, 1925)
- Orthoporus capucinus (Attems, 1950)
- Orthoporus cayennophilus (Silvestri, 1897)
- Orthoporus chihuanus Chamberlin, 1947
- Orthoporus chiriquensis Pocock, 1909
- Orthoporus cienegonus Chamberlin, 1952
- Orthoporus clavicollis (Karsch, 1881)
- Orthoporus cluniculus (Humbert & Saussure, 1870)
- Orthoporus cobanus Chamberlin, 1922
- Orthoporus comminutus (Attems, 1950)
- Orthoporus conifer (Attems, 1950)
- Orthoporus cordovanus Pocock, 1909
- Orthoporus diaporoides Silvestri, 1897
- Orthoporus discriminans Chamberlin, 1922
- Orthoporus dybasi (Chamberlin, 1952)
- Orthoporus esperanzae Chamberlin, 1943
- Orthoporus etholax Chamberlin, 1923
- Orthoporus euthus Chamberlin, 1952
- Orthoporus extensus Loomis, 1966
- Orthoporus festae (Silvestri, 1896)
- Orthoporus flavior Chamberlin & Mulaik, 1941
- Orthoporus foliatus Chamberlin, 1923
- Orthoporus fraternus (Saussure, 1860)
- Orthoporus gaigei Chamberlin, 1923
- Orthoporus gracilior Chamberlin, 1952
- Orthoporus guerreronus (Chamberlin, 1942)
- Orthoporus haitiensis Chamberlin, 1918
- Orthoporus heterogona Silvestri, 1902
- Orthoporus hoctunicolens Chamberlin, 1938
- Orthoporus kiemi Loomis, 1962
- Orthoporus leius Chamberlin, 1943
- Orthoporus leonicus Chamberlin, 1941
- Orthoporus lomonti Brölemann, 1932
- Orthoporus luchilicolens Chamberlin, 1938
- Orthoporus margarites (Chamberlin, 1946)
- Orthoporus mimus Chamberlin, 1943
- Orthoporus montezumae (Saussure, 1859)
- Orthoporus mundus Chamberlin, 1942
- Orthoporus nesiotes Chamberlin, 1923
- Orthoporus nodosus Loomis, 1974
- Orthoporus omalopage (Brölemann, 1905)
- Orthoporus ornatus (Girard, 1853)
- Orthoporus palmensis (Brölemann, 1905)
- Orthoporus paxillicauda Loomis, 1962
- Orthoporus poculifer Silvestri, 1897
- Orthoporus punctatissimus Silvestri, 1897
- Orthoporus reimoseri (Attems, 1950)
- Orthoporus rodriguezi (Brölemann, 1900)
- Orthoporus rugiceps (Attems, 1950)
- Orthoporus salvadoricus (Kraus, 1954)
- Orthoporus sanctus Chamberlin, 1947
- Orthoporus sculpturatus (Karsch, 1881)
- Orthoporus solicolens Chamberlin, 1938
- Orthoporus striatulus Pocock, 1909
- Orthoporus tabulinus Attems, 1914
- Orthoporus teapensis Pocock, 1909
- Orthoporus tehuacanus Chamberlin, 1952
- Orthoporus texicolens Chamberlin, 1938
- Orthoporus tizamensis Chamberlin, 1938
- Orthoporus torreonus Chamberlin, 1943
- Orthoporus triquetrus Loomis, 1936
- Orthoporus trisulcatus (Daday, 1889)
- Orthoporus vialis Loomis, 1974
- Orthoporus walkeri Chamberlin, 1923
- Orthoporus zizicolens (Chamberlin, 1938)
