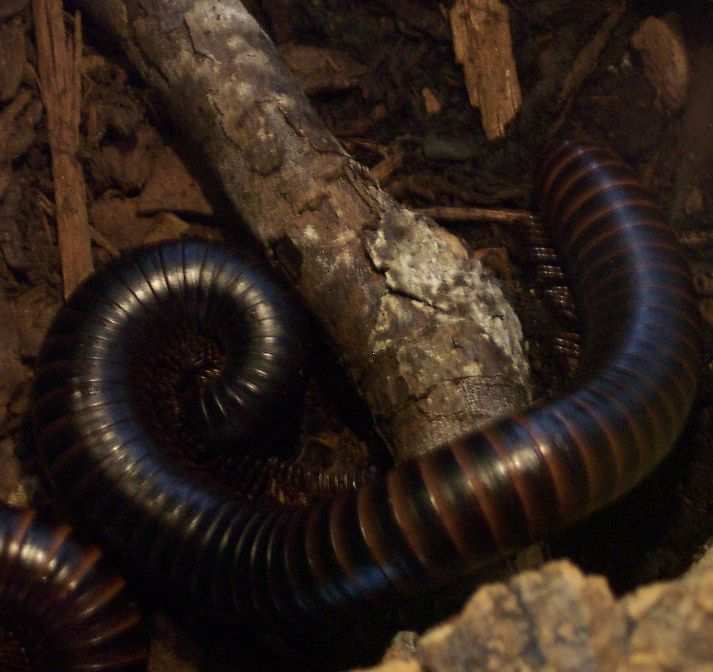
- Spirostreptus seychellarum

Scientific classification
- Kingdom: Animalia
- Phylum: Arthropoda
- Subphylum: Myriapoda
- Class: Diplopoda
- Order: Spirostreptida
- Suborder: Spirostreptidea
- Superfamily: Spirostreptoidea
- Family: Spirostreptidae; Brandt, 1833

Genera
- See text

= Spirostreptidae =

Family of millipedes

Spirostreptidae is a family of millipedes in the order Spirostreptida. It contains around 100 genera distributed in North and South America, the eastern Mediterranean, continental Africa, Madagascar, and Seychelles. It contains the following genera:

- Analocostreptus
- Anastreptus
- Anethoporus
- Archispirostreptus
- Attemsostreptus
- Aulonopygus
- Autostreptus
- Bicoxidens
- Brasilostreptus
- Brevitibius
- Bucinogonus
- Calathostreptus
- Calostreptus
- Camaricoproctus
- Cearostreptus
- Chamberlineptus
- Charactopygus
- Choristostreptus
- Cladodeptus
- Cladostreptus
- Cochleostreptus
- Cochliogonus
- Collostreptus
- Conchostreptus
- Demangeptus
- Diaporus
- Dicyclostreptus
- Eiphorus
- Ellateptus
- Epistreptus
- Eumekius
- Exallostreptus
- Exospermastix
- Exospermitius
- Furcillogonus
- Globanus
- Gonepityche
- Graphidostreptus
- Guanabarastreptus
- Guanabarostreptus
- Guaporeptus
- Guviogonus
- Guyanostreptus
- Gymnostreptus
- Haplogonopus
- Helicogonus
- Helicosolenus
- Hemigymnostreptus
- Heteropyge
- Heterostreptus
- Humilistreptus
- Involverostreptus
- Ischiotrichus
- Isophyllostreptus
- Isoporostreptus
- Kartinikus
- Kochliogonopus
- Kochliogonus
- Krugerostreptus
- Lobogonus
- Lophogonus
- Lophostreptus
- Mardonius
- Mayastreptus
- Megagymnostreptus
- Megaskamma
- Metagonocoelius
- Metriostreptus
- Microtrullius
- Minasgonus
- Myostreptus
- Nanostreptus
- Nesostreptus
- Obelostreptus
- Odontostreptus
- Onychostreptus
- Ophistreptoides
- Ophistreptus
- Oreastreptus
- Orthogoneptus
- Orthoporoides
- Orthoporus
- Paulistostreptus
- Pemptoporus
- Perizonopus
- Perustreptus
- Phallorthus
- Plagiotaphrus
- Plusioporus
- Porostreptus
- Pseudogymnostreptus
- Pseudotibiozus
- Ptenogonostreptus
- Ptilostreptus
- Rhamphostreptus
- Rhapidostreptus
- Rhodesiostreptus
- Rondostreptus
- Rubanostreptus
- Rutabulogonus
- Sagmatostreptus
- Scaphiostreptus
- Sechelleptus
- Skytostreptus
- Sooretama
- Sphaeromerus
- Spirocyclistus
- Spiropoeus
- Spirostreptus
- Stenostreptus
- Streptolus
- Synophryostreptus
- Telodeinopus
- Telomicropus
- Termatodiscus
- Tibiozus
- Tomogonus
- Torynopus
- Trachystreptus
- Triaenostreptus
- Trichogonostreptus
- Tropitrachelus
- Tubostreptus
- Udzungwastreptus
- Urostreptus
- Urotropis
- Venezueneptus
- Vilcastreptus
- Zantekius
