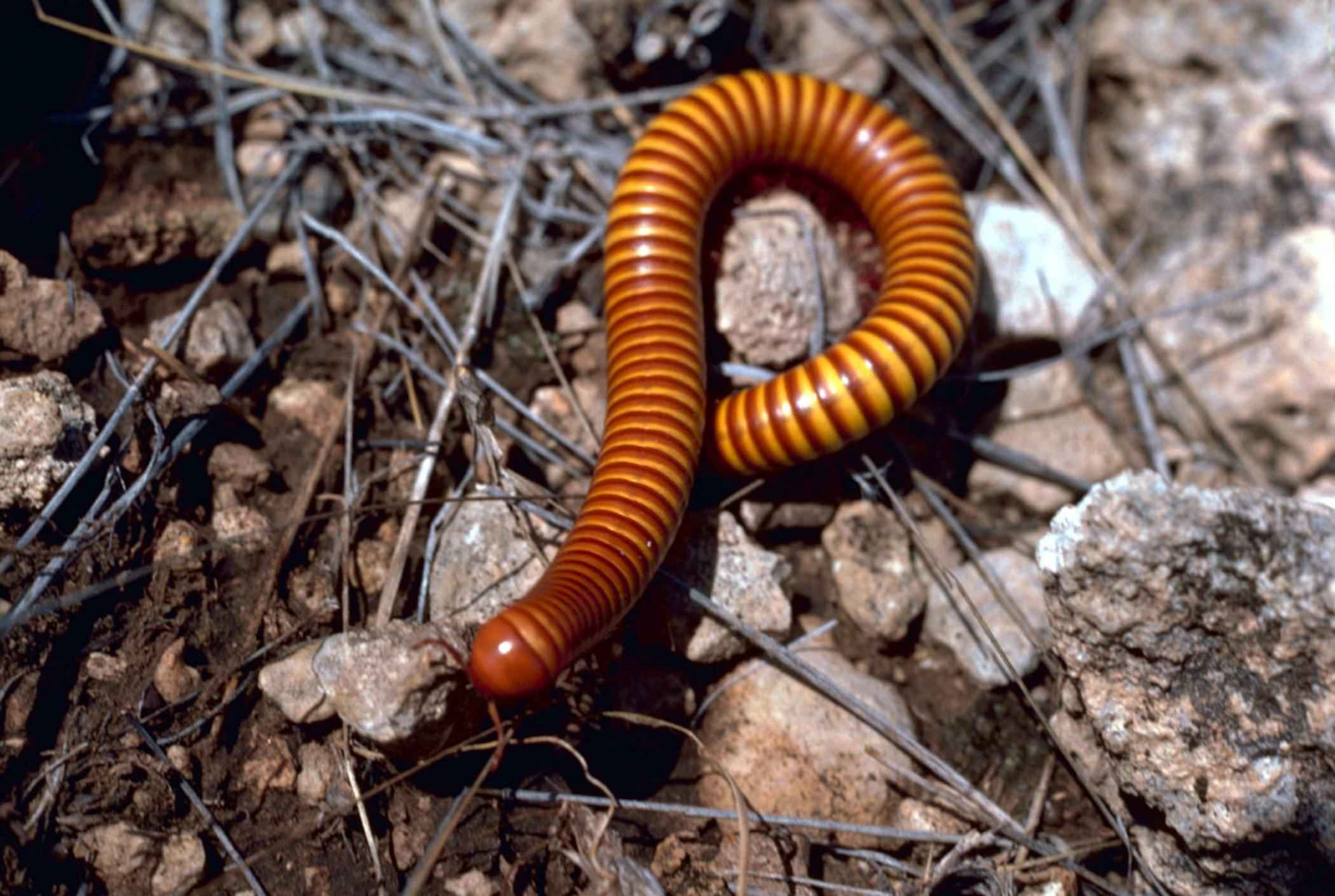
- Orthoporus sp. (Spirostreptidae) from North America

Scientific classification
- Kingdom: Animalia
- Phylum: Arthropoda
- Subphylum: Myriapoda
- Class: Diplopoda
- Superorder: Juliformia
- Order: Spirostreptida; Brandt, 1833

Families
- 10: see text.

= Spirostreptida =

Spirostreptida Temporal range: Cenomanian–Present

Order of millipedes

Spirostreptida is an order of long, cylindrical millipedes. There are approximately 1000 described species, making Spirostreptida the third largest order of millipedes after Polydesmida and Chordeumatida.

== Description ==
Spirostreptida are generally large, long and cylindrical, with 30 to 90 body rings. Eyes are present in most. This order contains the longest millipedes known: the giant African millipedes of the genus Archispirostreptus that may exceed 30 centimetres (12 in).

== Distribution ==
Spirostreptida contains mainly tropical species, and occurs in Africa, Southern Asia to Japan, Australia, and the Western Hemisphere from the United States to Argentina.

== Evolutionary history ==
Like most millipede groups, they have a fragmentary fossil record. The oldest record of the group is the extinct family Electrocambalidae, which is known from the Burmese amber of Myanmar, dating to the Cenomanian stage of the Late Cretaceous around 99 million years ago, which belongs to the suborder Cambalidea. The only other fossil records of the group are Protosilvestria from the Oligocene of France, which belongs to either Cambalidae or Cambalopsidae, and an undescribed species of Epinannolene (Pseudonannolenidae) from the Miocene aged Dominican amber.

== Classification ==
The order comprises two suborders, Cambalidea and Spirostreptidea, the latter further divided into two superfamilies.

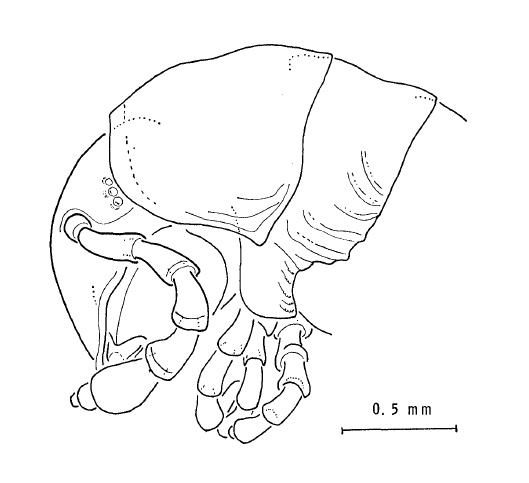
Cambala minor (Cambalidae), a cave-millipede from eastern North America

Suborder Cambalidea

Cambalidae
Cambalopsidae (includes the former Glyphiulidae and Pericambalidae)
Choctellidae
Iulomorphidae
Pseudonannolenidae
†Electrocambalidae

Suborder Spirostreptidea

Superfamily Odontopygoidea

Atopogestidae
Odontopygidae

Superfamily Spirostreptoidea

Adiaphorostreptidae
Harpagophoridae
Spirostreptidae

== Select species ==
- Phyllogonostreptus nigrolabiatus- a large species from India
- Spinotarsus caboverdus- a species that has become an agricultural pest in Cape Verde
