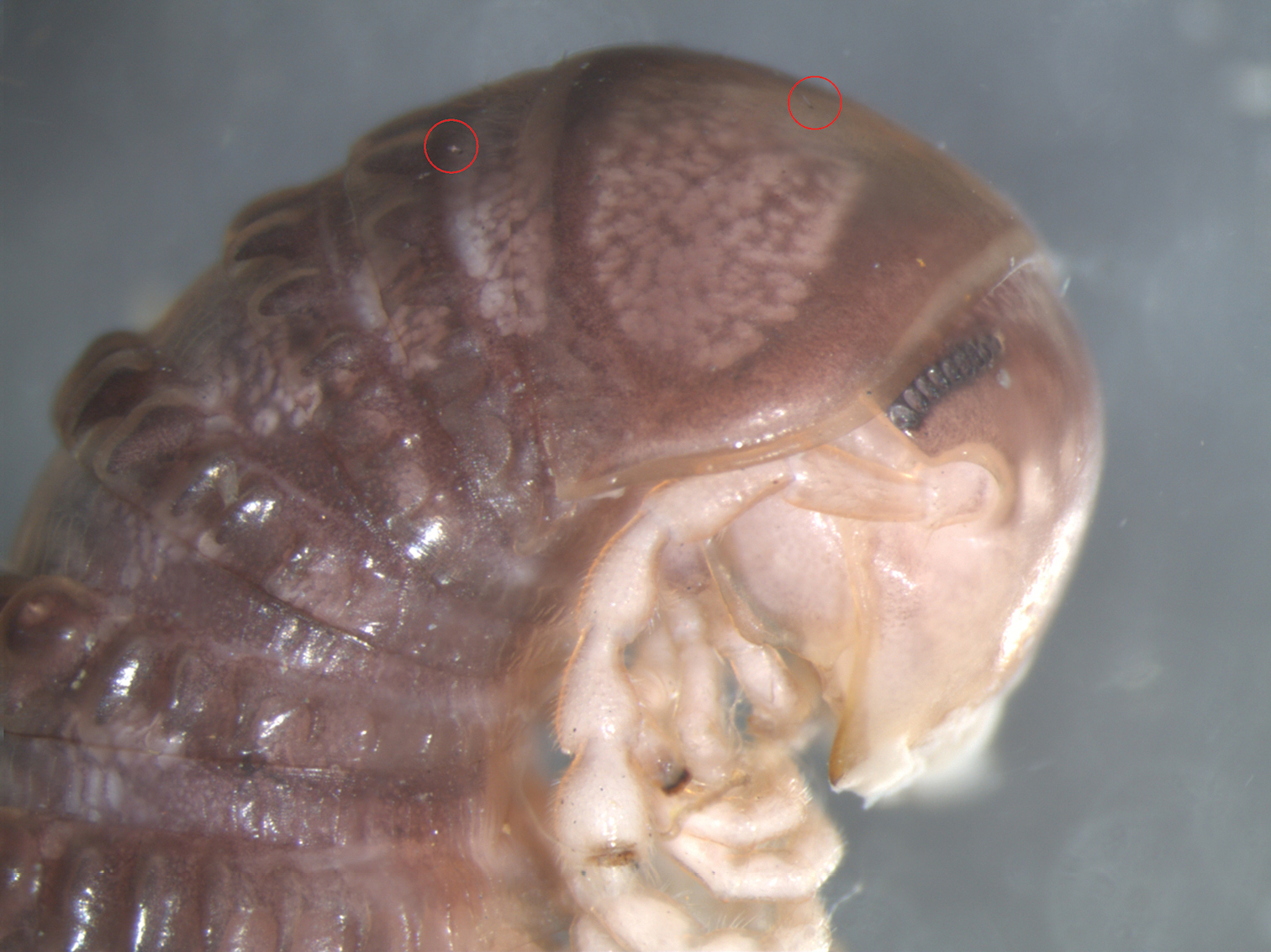

Scientific classification
- Kingdom: Animalia
- Phylum: Arthropoda
- Subphylum: Myriapoda
- Class: Diplopoda
- Order: Spirostreptida
- Family: Cambalidae
- Genus: Cambala
- Species: C. annulata

Binomial name
- Cambala annulata (Say, 1821)

= Cambala annulata =

Species of millipede

Cambala annulata is a species of millipede in the family Cambalidae. It is found in North America.
