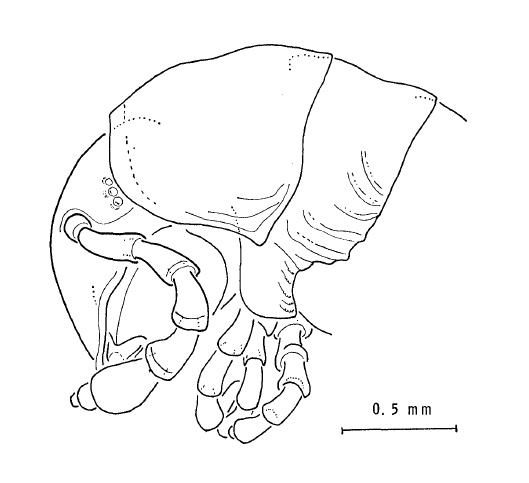

Scientific classification
- Kingdom: Animalia
- Phylum: Arthropoda
- Subphylum: Myriapoda
- Class: Diplopoda
- Order: Spirostreptida
- Family: Cambalidae
- Genus: Cambala
- Species: C. minor

Binomial name
- Cambala minor Bollman, 1888

= Cambala minor =

Species of millipede

Cambala minor is a species of millipede in the family Cambalidae. It is found in North America.
