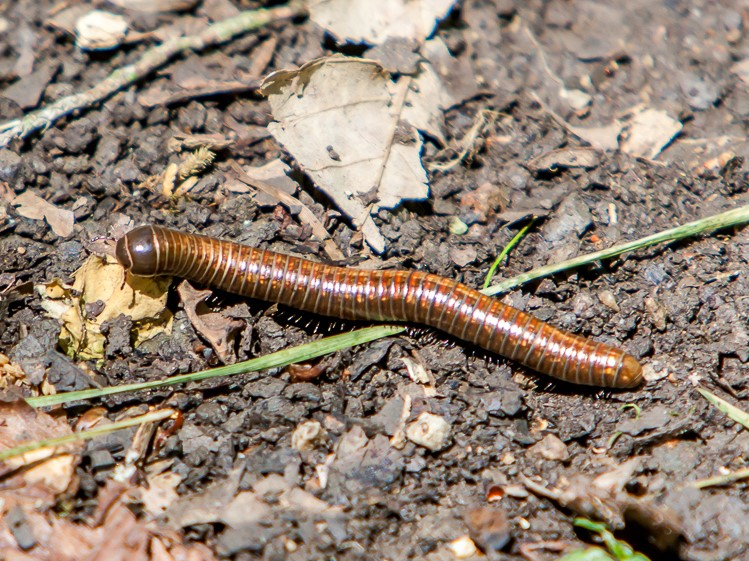
- Choctella cumminsi

Scientific classification
- Kingdom: Animalia
- Phylum: Arthropoda
- Subphylum: Myriapoda
- Class: Diplopoda
- Order: Spirostreptida
- Family: Choctellidae; Chamberlin & Hoffman, 1950
- Genus: Choctella; Chamberlin, 1918

= Choctella =

Genus of millipedes

Choctella is a genus of millipedes in the monotypic family Choctellidae. Its two species are native to the south-eastern United States. C. cumminsi Chamberlin, 1918, occurs on the Cumberland Plateau from central Tennessee to northern Alabama and C. hubrichti Hoffman, 1965, occurs in central Alabama.
