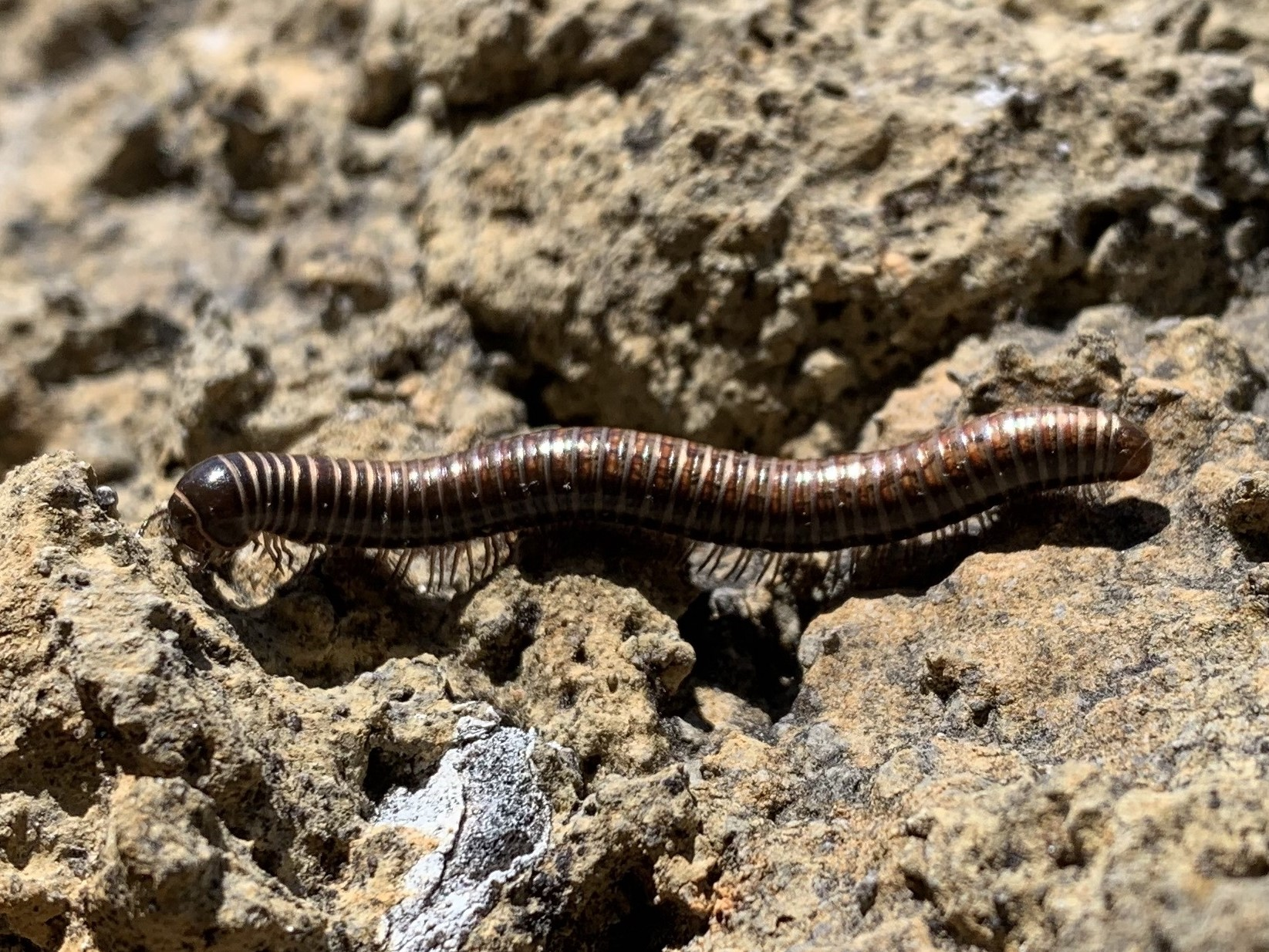

Scientific classification
- Kingdom: Animalia
- Phylum: Arthropoda
- Subphylum: Myriapoda
- Class: Diplopoda
- Order: Spirostreptida
- Family: Choctellidae
- Genus: Choctella
- Species: C. cumminsi

Binomial name
- Choctella cumminsi Chamberlin, 1918

= Choctella cumminsi =

Species of millipede

Choctella cumminsi is a species of millipede in the family Choctellidae. It is found in North America.
