= Endere (millipede) =

Scientific classification
- Kingdom: Animalia
- Phylum: Arthropoda
- Subphylum: Myriapoda
- Class: Diplopoda
- Order: Spirostreptida
- Family: Cambalidae
- Genus: Endere; Loomis, 1938

Genus of millipedes

Endere is a genus of millipedes in the family Cambalidae. There is at least one described species in Endere, E. disora.
