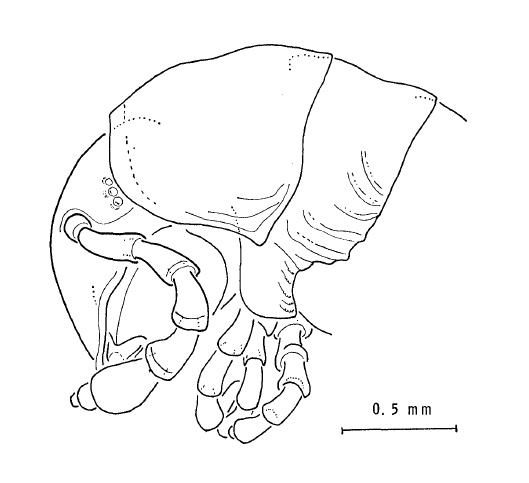

Scientific classification
- Kingdom: Animalia
- Phylum: Arthropoda
- Subphylum: Myriapoda
- Class: Diplopoda
- Order: Spirostreptida
- Family: Cambalidae
- Genus: Cambala; Gray, 1832

= Cambala =

Genus of millipedes

Cambala is a genus of millipedes in the family Cambalidae. There are about 18 described species in Cambala.

== Species ==
These 18 species belong to the genus Cambala:

- Cambala annulata (Say, 1821)
- Cambala arkansana Chamberlin, 1942
- Cambala arkansasa Chamberlin
- Cambala caeca Loomis, 1953
- Cambala captiosa Causey, 1959
- Cambala cara Causey, 1953
- Cambala cristula Loomis, 1938
- Cambala hubrichti Hoffman, 1958
- Cambala lactaria Gray, 1832
- Cambala minor Bollman, 1888
- Cambala nodulosa Butler, 1876
- Cambala ochra Chamberlin, 1942
- Cambala reddelli Causey, 1964
- Cambala saltillona Chamberlin, 1943
- Cambala speabia Causey, 1964
- Cambala speobia Chamberlin, 1953
- Cambala texana Loomis, 1938
- Cambala washingtonensis Causey, 1954
