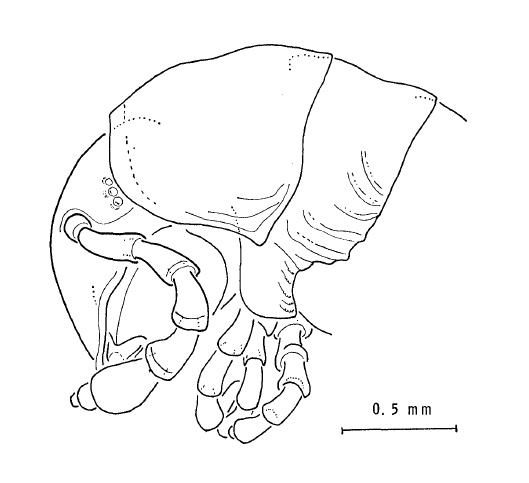
- Cambala minor

Scientific classification
- Kingdom: Animalia
- Phylum: Arthropoda
- Subphylum: Myriapoda
- Class: Diplopoda
- Order: Spirostreptida
- Family: Cambalidae; Bollman, 1893

= Cambalidae =

Family of millipedes

Cambalidae is a family of millipedes in the order Spirostreptida. There are at least 20 genera and 80 described species in Cambalidae.

== Genera ==
- Alakene Chamberlin, 1941
- Apocoptogonus
- Buwatia Chamberlin, 1912
- Cambala Gray, 1832
- Chiraziulus
- Dimerogonus
- Doilene Chamberlin, 1941
- Eclomus
- Endere Loomis, 1938
- Eumastigonus
- Euryischiogonus
- Hawaicambala
- Jarmilka
- Leiodere Loomis, 1938
- Mexicambala Causey, 1964
- Nannolene Bollman, 1887
- Odachurus Loomis, 1938
- Paiteya Chamberlin, 1910
- Pharodere Loomis, 1938
- Platydere Loomis, 1938
- Proscelomerion
- Stenischiogonus
- Tigolene Chamberlin, 1941
- Titsona Chamberlin, 1912
- Tridere Cook & Loomis, 1938
